= Black Manosphere =

Collection of Black masculist and misogynoir digital platforms and media

The Black Manosphere is composed of various digital platforms and media (e.g., blogs, online forums, podcasts, social media, websites), and uses various social media hashtags (e.g., #blackmanosphere, #passportbros, #IBMOR [Introspective Black Men of Reform], #SYSBM [Save Your Self Black Man]). The Black Manosphere, which is primarily mediated through YouTube, Twitter, and podcasts, share the commonality of the red pill philosophy. The type of red pill philosophy held by the Black Manosphere is a racialized form of red pill philosophy and is part of a broader Black American audio and radio broadcasting tradition. The racialized red pill philosophy of the Black Manosphere has been characterized by Sharp (2024) as misogynoir that possesses alt-right and far-right elements, and as being embodied in parts of the Black Manosphere, such as the passport bros movement and “alpha male” podcasts like the Fresh and Fit Podcast.

== Notable people ==
=== Kevin Samuels ===
A notable figure, who had significant influence within the Black Manosphere and introduced Black men to the Black Manosphere, was Kevin Samuels. Samuels was one of the few within the Black Manosphere who received broader mainstream recognition for his social media platform and influence. Sharp (2024) characterized Samuels as being a charismatic figure who promoted hegemonic Black masculinity and embodied the racialized red pill philosophy commonly espoused within the Black Manosphere. The message brought by Kevin Samuels laid the ideological groundwork for, among other sub-groups within the Black Manosphere, the offshoot sub-group and subculture that became the Passport Bros movement. Samuels' common talking points often serve as a major premise for advocacy within Passport Bros' messaging.

=== Andrew Tate ===
A divisive influencer, Tate has amassed 9.9 million followers on Twitter as of August 2024 and was the third-most googled person in 2023.[6] He has been dubbed the "king of toxic masculinity",[7] has called himself a misogynist,[8] and is politically described as right-wing[9] or far-right.[10] As of mid-2026, Andrew Tate has been arrested in Miami and is in US custody. Tate has faced numerous criminal and civil legal proceedings in Romania, the United Kingdom, and the United States relating to allegations including rape, human trafficking, and tax evasion.[11][12][13][14] The Romanian trafficking case remained unresolved but stalled by procedural delays, and Tate had been released from Romania's travel ban and all bail conditions; separate UK proceedings remained active, where the Crown Prosecution Service authorised 21 charges in May 2025 and police reopened an earlier investigation into 2015-era allegations following a misconduct inquiry into how it had originally been handled.[15]

=== Others ===
Other members of the black manosphere in the Anglosphere include David Cooley, better known as No Fugazee, Tristan Tate, HSTikkyTokky, and Myron Gaines. Black pioneers of the manosphere from Africa nclude figures such as Andrew Kibe from Kenya.

== Sub-groups ==
=== Introspective Black Men of Reform ===
Introspective Black Men of Reform (IBMOR) seek black liberation and to establish a Black patriarchy; they subscribe to a Men Going Their Own Way (MGTOW) philosophy.

=== Save Your Self Black Men ===
Save Your Self Black Men (SYSBM) is a part of the Black Manosphere, which identifies African American women as a problem, advocates for African American men to seek romantic relationships with women that are not African American.

=== Passport Bros ===
The passport bros movement is a social media movement that has become a viral phenomenon. The passport bros movement may have originated among an emerging digital community of African American men in 2011 with African American film director, Al Greeze, via his documentary film, Frustrated, where the term, passport bro, was initially coined or introduced into mainstream culture.

Following the initial publication of Greeze's video documentary, numerous YouTube channels developed among African American men, who vlogged about travel, relationships, and foreign women. The passport bros movement began to spread from digital communities of African American men in 2019, considerably expanding as a movement, into other digital communities of men with diverse racial backgrounds, during the COVID-19 pandemic and COVID-19 lockdowns. The passport bros movement has since spread throughout social media platforms, such as Instagram, Reddit, TikTok, and YouTube.

== Overview ==
=== Definition and defining traits ===
Passport bros are single men with high-earning employment who travel to foreign countries; they advocate for men to travel to non-western countries to increase the likelihood of them finding women that fit their Tradwife ideals. On social media, passport bros have been described as American men who travel internationally in search of traditional values-oriented women that they can have romantic relationships with via dating or marriage.

Passport Bros have been described as a Men Going Their Own Way (MGTOW) sub-group within the broader manosphere, and as a sub-group of Save Your Self Black Men (SYSBM). Save Your Self Black Men is a part of the Black Manosphere, which identifies African American women as a problem, advocates for African American men to seek romantic relationships with women that are not African American women, and criticizes African American women. Similar to Save Your Self Black Men, Passport Bros also criticize African American women; additionally, Passport Bros advocate for other African American men to get and use their United States passport card for international travel outside of the United States of America as a solution.

The passport bros movement has been described as a phenomenon that "illustrates how the manosphere transcends its Western origins, functioning as a multicultural and transnational domain where culture, national identities and gender are actively negotiated.” The passport bros movement is an operationalization of the Black Manosphere's racialized red pill philosophy. Passport bro social media communities (e.g., Reddit) are composed of existing passport bros, or veteran members, and aspiring passport bros, or new members. Rather than considering themselves to be an aspect of the manosphere, passport bros consider themselves to be more of a movement. In contrast to other aspects of the manosphere, passport bros are more inclined to specify and identify their race, ethnicity, and/or nationality. Additionally, contrary to social media manosphere communities that are largely composed of white men, the passport bros movement includes men of color. Passport bro communities are primarily composed of African American men as well as others, such as men of Chinese, Latino, and Indian descent. The Black Manosphere's racialized red pill philosophy has resulted in a leveling effect upon racial and ethnic identities; consequently, this has contributed to the development of racially and ethnically inclusive spaces within the passport bros movement. While Western men have had a long history of sexual tourism in less expensive countries and countries within the Global South, passport bros have sought a combination of both sexual pleasure and long-term romantic relationships with their companions.

=== Data and statistics ===
In 2023, the Passport bros hashtag had increased to more than 470 million views on TikTok. In 2026, Passport bro Reddit communities included over 200,000 members.

== History ==
The passport bros movement may have originated among an emerging digital community of African American men in 2011 with African American film director, Al Greeze, who created the documentary film, Frustrated. In his documentary, Greeze used the term, passport bro, which he initially coined or introduced into mainstream culture. Greeze's documentary “depicts African-American men seeking relationships with women in Brazil. According to witnesses interviewed, these men experienced a sense of displacement in the face of African-American women in the United States who were emancipated, sometimes earning more money than them", which, consequently, contributed to their view of African American women having and showing less respect toward the masculinity of African American men. Following the initial publication of Greeze's video documentary, numerous YouTube channels developed among African American men, who vlogged, providing advice about travel and relationships with foreign women.

Charles Tyler, who was an African-American man born in Philadelphia, United States of America and produced his earliest content, “Black Brazilian Women for Afro American who Travel”, in 2012, is regarded by Ph.D. candidate Sedrick Miles as the archetype for and godfather of the Passport Bros movement. Throughout the 2010s, Charles Tyler produced YouTube content for the Charles Tyler Show (The Black Man's Option), which included content advocating for Black American men getting their United States passport card in order to travel to Brazil, content comparing African-American women with Afro-Brazilian women or with other foreign women, and content discussing how to earn an income on the web. Prior to more recent social media influencers on Instagram, TikTok, and YouTube, during the times of his earliest videos in the 2010s, travel content was largely limited to blogs. Given that the travel space was predominantly occupied by white people, Tyler built his audience, independent of this established space, highlighting his experiences and knowledge about how to obtain passports and travel visas, and sharing perspectives that appealed to working-class Black American men.

A notable figure, who had significant influence within the Black Manosphere and introduced Black men to the Black Manosphere, was Kevin Samuels. Samuels was one of the few within the Black Manosphere who received broader mainstream recognition for his social media platform and influence. Sharp (2024) characterized Samuels as being a charismatic figure who promoted hegemonic Black masculinity and embodied the racialized red pill philosophy commonly espoused within the Black Manosphere. The message brought by Kevin Samuels laid the ideological groundwork for, among other sub-groups within the Black Manosphere, the offshoot sub-group and subculture that became the Passport Bros movement. Samuels' common talking points often serve as a major premise for advocacy within Passport Bros' messaging.

The passport bros movement began to spread from digital communities of African American men in 2019, considerably expanding as a movement, into other digital communities of men with diverse racial backgrounds, during the COVID-19 pandemic and COVID-19 lockdowns.

On July 19, 2023, American rapper Bas released his second single, Passport Bros, with American rapper J. Cole, which was part of Bas’ fourth studio album, We Only Talk About Real Shit When We're Fucked Up .

== Themes ==
=== Philosophy ===
The passport bros movement is a sub-unit within the manosphere, where the subject of culture and nationality intersect. Passport bros are Western men who advocate for international travel to countries within the Global South and the benefits of working remotely. Comparing women in the West to women of the Global South, passport bros advocate for travel to countries in the Global South for the purpose of finding women who are characterized and viewed as being more submissive and feminine. A common narrative among passport bros are men who became digital nomads after having quit their previous jobs, and lower cost of living abroad. Contrary to the characterization of the manosphere as being composed of young men who are not well educated, have not been successful, and are marginalized, analysis of sub-reddit data demonstrates that passport bros are men of various ages who have specialized forms of employment or considerable amounts of money in their savings accounts; consequently, this provides them the ability to work or live internationally for months at a time. The common problems identified in the manosphere with dating women in the West has been met with the solution found in the passport bros movement via international dating with women in the Global South.

Within the Reddit social media communities of passport bros, inquiries include consideration of whether it is the best decision to return to Europe or the United States of America with their Asian wives in hope of preventing her from becoming westernized and what countries are best to consider if one is a speaker of the Russian language. The four themes found among the sub-reddit passport bros were: Nation and Relationship Goals, where passport bros establish ties between their goals for relationships, the countries, and stereotypes about the countries; Class Discussions and Economic Leverage, where passport bros consider financial differences and societal structures within societies; Cultural Parallels, where passport bros make comparisons between countries to justify the opinions they have; and Self-reflection, where passport bros consider their social position in prediction of how they may be viewed in other countries. In one of the passport bro discussions regarding whether or not a Black men should immigrate to China, a user stated: “dark skin is seen as a feature of the peasant class. China is the last place I'd advise a brother to come to as there's a lot working against us.”

A view shared by a passport bro regarding the characterization of Passport Bros:

Passport Bros are driven by a desire for peace, appreciation, respect, kindness, and love within relationships, values they feel are increasingly rare in their own cultural context. They see the trend of shifting demographics and cultural changes within Western societies as a cause for concern, believing that the traditional foundations of relationships are under threat. As a response (…) [we] choose to explore relationships with foreign women who are (…) more in line with their desired values and expectations.

Passport bros may invoke angry Black woman or strong Black woman stereotypes as a teaching tool for informing Black men about Black masculinity. Drummond (2023) indicates that Latinas and Black American women have their agency taken away from them through Passport Bros’ advocacy of sexual tourism for women of the Global South and traditional gender roles. She also views the song, Beautiful, as an apt audiovisual analogy for passport bros’ advocacy to specifically visit Brazil, which is characterized as a fantasy depiction of scantily clad, exoticized Brazilian women who were physically lustful toward Black American men. The non-conformity to female gender roles within patriarchy and non-submissive behavior of Black American women has been characterized as one of the major assertions made by passport bros about Black American women. A major premise held within passport bro advocacy that she identifies is the perception that in order to find love a necessary precondition is to choose women in Latin America over Black American women; this choice in mate selection is due to the view held that Latin American women are women who still subscribe to traditional gender roles and values, which is also characterized as being “motivated by a fantasy experience where they exercise their power regarding gender, race, class, and nationality.” Drummond (2023) indicates that the following view expressed is emblematic of the views commonly shared by the broader passport bro community:

The reality is that many of these men who are choosing to travel abroad are high value six figure men that many of you modern women claim you want with the caveat being that many of these men who choose to exercise their options and travel abroad are traditional men who are in search of traditional women and who want nothing to do with modern women and their feminist ideologies and mindsets. Instead, these men are choosing to go to other countries to meet women who understand what it means to be a wife and help me. Women who understand what it means to reflect and respect his values and his standards. Women who are feminine and submissive and not combative, are traditional men in search of traditional women.

A common symbolic gesture made by passport bros is showing their United States passport card in their advocacy of the passport bros movement, which is characterized as being done as an act of leveraging one's self-perceived American privilege and done based on the presumption of being viewed as financially wealthy when traveling within Latin America. The stigma commonly applied to the term “modern” in the description of Black American women as “modern women” is characterized by Drummond (2023) as also implying that women in Latin America are viewed as non-modern colonial subjects who have not been influenced by feminism, and that, contrary to that, feminism does exist in Brazil. Generally, Afro-Latinas and Afro-Brazilian women have been sexually objectified and used in the material promotions and advertisements in Brazil for sex tourism and girlfriend experiences. Consequently, this has fed into the preconceived notions held by passport bros regarding the sexual availability of Afro-Latinas in general and Afro-Brazilian women in particular. Drummond (2023) recognized that passport bros frequently dispute the allegations of their advocacy as being promotions of sex tourism, but she contends that the advocacy still falls into the pre-travel messaging for sex tourism. Drummond (2023) contends that the Black American women stereotypes invoked by passport bros to contrast Black American women with women in Latin America drives further competition between Latin American and Black American women and creates a picture of the soft life granted to womanhood by patriarchy as being set aside for women in Latin America and Black American women as being undeserving of the same class of womanhood.

The development of social media has facilitated and enhanced the ability of individuals and communities being producers of culture and social messaging that have considerable influence on the development of gender identifies and performance of gender roles. Passport bros is example of this. Passport bros advocate for rejecting western women who are characterized as independent and seeking out traditional foreign women instead.

The equalization of heteronormative reality between men and women within heterosexual relationships has resulted in some men rejecting the changes occurring domestically and seeking alternatives on the web and internationally to broaden their search. Cross-cultural relationships and the international dating industry in foreign countries serve as an outlet for the passport bros movement akin to international frontiersmen and explorers seeking out a glorious unknown.

Sharp (2024) critiqued the pattern of white heteropatriarchy often found in literature on the manosphere, which focuses on topics such as aggrieved entitlement and heteropatriarchy and centers white men for critique of white privilege and male privilege, and is frequently absent on the intersectional topics of race and gender; he indicates that advancement in insights of both intersectionality and masculinity can be gained by centering black men for critique and that centering black men for critique introduces complexities to the overly simplistic ideas and presumptions about gender and privilege that critical literature on the manosphere frequently has. Whiteness, as a presumed default, techno-cultural identifier, has resulted in its conflation with digital identity. The passport bros movement is a growing digital community of men who emphasize the power of men's choice and the choosability of women. Passport bros reject relationships with western women, who are viewed as having and demonstrating entitled social and financial behaviors in relationships, in favor of relationships with women from non-western countries that include performance of traditional gender roles and that reaffirm their sense of traditional masculinity, which Sharp (2024) characterizes as bearing features of cultural imperialism and neocolonialism. More specifically, Sharp (2024) states: “In a neocolonial act of exploitation, passportbros suggest that foreign women are more accessible with American currency and status, perpetuating colonial legacies and imperialism through online forums.” Additionally, Sharp (2024) indicates the anti-western women rhetoric shared by passport bros propagates stereotypes and perceptions that are harmful to western women. Within the broader manosphere, the term “modern women” is a neologism and archetype that carries a “post-feminist sentiment of female agency and financial independence from men.”

In contrast to MGTOW, and in parallel with pick-up artists in the manosphere, passport bros both actively separate themselves from western women and actively initiate sexual relations with non-western women. Akin to incel segments of the manosphere, looks are also another aspect of conversation within passport bro communities, where men who may be locally regarded as physically unattractive are advised that they may fare better in finding and forming relationships with attractive women in foreign countries. In particular, some within the passport bros digital communities have proposed a “’just-be-white’ theory, which posits that adherence to Eurocentric standards is crucial for successful dating.” Regarding discussions about western women, for passport bros, western women are “often depicted as entitled, with a laundry list of contradictory expectations—such as desiring a traditional man while not embodying traditional values themselves—being overweight and failing to appreciate Western men's efforts.” Additionally, western women are also “described as self-absorbed and overly righteous in their rejection of traditional gender roles, thus rendering traditional relationships obsolete. Bitterness permeates the posts in this forum, with many discussing Western women's envy of passportbros' economic and romantic mobility.” The rationale behind such discussions is that since western women are “financially independent and liberated, they generally do not feel the need for men. Consequently, they only date men they can emotionally dominate and view as entertainment, positioning all their prospective matches under their control.” In similarity with MGTOW, passport bros seek to separate themselves from western women and the West at large. As part of the advocated solution to the perceived problem, passport bros advocate for travel to foreign countries, where, in contrast to western women, non-western women are characterized as being more submissive, traditional, appreciative, and family-oriented as well as having more humility and reasonability. Despite there being contrasting views on gender roles and non-western women within the passport bro community, the common and shared unifier within the passport bro community is the critical view of western women.

Sanders (2024) states: “Both SYSBM and passport bros share the belief that their basis for denouncing Black women is because Black women are non-traditional women in the sense that they lack femininity, they are not submissive in their actions towards their romantic partners, and they are not in good physical shape. These collective groups within the Black Manosphere are united through their rhetoric that is embedded in misogynoir to specifically target Black women. Their misogynoir-based rhetoric is used for systematic messaging to center Black women, specifically Black American women, as the single cause of the negative outcomes that Black men face and the disadvantages of Black people.” Sanders (2024) later clarified: “The theme contempt for Black women exhibited the attitudes and beliefs of the Black Manosphere towards Black women. The contempt for Black women was evident in several forms, including deliberate disrespect and derogatory remarks. Numerous tweets from the Black Manosphere conveyed a strong sense of disdain, scorn, and disrespect towards Black women, reflecting the belief that they are insignificant and undeserving of respect.” Based on this characterized premise and rationale, SYSBM and Passport Bros both advocate for African American men's separation from African American women, and Passport Bros specifically advocate for African American men to use their passports to seek what they believe to be better prospects of women, internationally.

Collins (2025) highlighted the stereotyping, prejudice, colorism, misogynoir, and anti-Blackness found within the advocacy of passport bros, such as fetishizing women of color in non-western countries and emphasis on the decreased desirability of Black American women for relationships.

Panasiuk (2025) recognized the similarities in messaging between Playboy Magazine and the manosphere: “sex without marriage, children as burden.” Additionally, the shared similarity between the advocacy of women's independence from men by feminists and the advocacy of men not committing to women by passport bros and MGTOW were viewed as being contributing factors that stop families from being formed. Framed within her broader argument, Panasiuk (2025) indicates that feminist, MGTOW, and passport bro advocacy, which contributes to stopping the forming of families, serves a larger purpose within neoliberal capitalism through not resisting its gender management strategy, and concludes: “cultural production is not neutral entertainment but targeted psychological warfare, executed through discrete, aesthetically seductive fragments that cumulatively reshape subjectivity.”

Passport bros disapprove of what they perceive as the entitled behavior and promiscuity of western women; consequently, passport bros travel internationally in search of a wives in non-western countries. Soh (2026) posits the possibility of passport bro advocacy for traveling abroad as an intrasexual competition strategy to advocate for men to travel internationally, which, as a result, gives the men who remain increased domestic advantage with the women in western countries due to the decrease in number of men to compete with over the women.

Giolo and Rinaldi (2026) characterized the ideology shared amongst passport bros as bearing “reactionary and (sometimes) extreme notions.” In discussion about the level of difficulty of dating in various countries around the world, one passport bro stated: “In my view, the Philippines ranks above. Kenya is probably the most westernized country in Africa, and it shows. I’ve dated in Nairobi before and found it pretty easy, though not quite as easy as in the Philippines. Personally, I like dating in Tanzania more, since the women there tend to be more traditional and less westernized.” Some passport bros considered the impact of their race in the context of dating in foreign countries, stating: “If you’re Black, your experience tends to be more positive in certain Western countries but less so in parts of Latin America. If you’re Asian, Middle Eastern, or Latino, it’s difficult to generalize. Your experience can vary depending on where you are and how you look, since those regions are quite diverse.” In dialogue about being attractive to and finding a traditional wife in Central Asia, one passport bro stated: “Head to Central Asia! Eat horse and don’t be a bitch. That’s all women there expect of you. Work hard, don’t get cold before they do. That’s all.” In response to this statement, another passport bro responded: “Sure, it’s quite common knowledge. If you want a traditional woman, you must be a traditional man. There’s no way around, you can’t win her with your cash or passport. That attracts only vain women.” Another passport bro, highlighting the role of male attractiveness and female attractiveness in dating, stated: “Whether one feels proud strolling down the street with their partner is not in the eye of the beholder: it’s inherently connected to other people wanting what you have. A man has no choice about feeling prouder with his 21 year-old supermodel ... Women have no choice about feeling prouder with a 6ft athlete in an Armani suit than with a short, obese, balding, 55 year-old (with or without a nose). This is the nature of our species.”

=== Locations ===
Passport bros advocate for traveling to countries in Asia and other countries within the Global South. Countries and regions that passport bros have advocated travel to include: Africa, Brazil, Colombia, Dominican Republic, Eastern Europe, Japan, Latin America, Philippines, Russia, and Thailand. Passport bros commonly stigmatize and warn against traveling to western countries, such as Canada, France, Germany, the United Kingdom, and the United States of America.

==== Colombia ====
Provenza and Parque Lleras are locales within the nightlife industry of Medellín, Colombia. These areas have insufficient legal and regulatory enforcement, including within its tourism industry, which contributes to illegal, exploitative treatment of women and children, and illegal uses of drugs. Within this existing domestic context, some passport bros have advocated for other passport bros to visit Medellín as a place for finding foreign women and sexual pleasure at comparatively affordable financial costs.

=== In popular culture ===
On July 19, 2023, American rapper Bas released his second single, Passport Bros, with American rapper J. Cole, which was part of Bas’ fourth studio album, We Only Talk About Real Shit When We're Fucked Up.

== Counterparts ==
=== Black Womanosphere ===
A female counterpart to the Black Manosphere is the Black Womanosphere, or Black Femmosphere. African American women within the black womanosphere support heteropatriarchy. Consequently, the traditional gender role of Black women being a homemaker and men being providers is supported and advocated for. In particular, women within the black womanosphere advocate for and advise other women on how they can appeal to higher social status men, by means of advocating for exercise, submissiveness, and homemaking. In particular, there is a common view within the black womanosphere that higher social status men are inclined to be sexually and emotionally unfaithful. As a result of this shared skeptical and practical viewpoint, rather than advocacy for monogamy, there is also advocacy for women to focus on acquiring money from higher social status men. In similarity with passport bros, and partly driven by the misogynoir and criticism from African American men within the black manosphere, women in the black womanosphere also support interracial dating. In contrast to the black manosphere, the black womanosphere has a greater focus and emphasis on self-improvement and self-love rather than criticism of men.
