= Marianne Dainton =

American academic

Marianne Dainton is a scholar of interpersonal communication and a Professor in Communication at La Salle University in Philadelphia, Pennsylvania. Dainton has made substantial contributions to the communication field with several publications concerning relationship maintenance and personal relationships. In addition to her research, Dainton has contributed to mainstream press stories for the CBS Morning Show, Wall Street Journal, and The Philadelphia Inquirer concerning relationship maintenance. As an author, she is widely held in libraries worldwide.

== Education ==
Marianne Dainton received her bachelor's degree from Villanova University, her master's degree from Ohio State University and doctorate from Ohio State University.

== Publications ==
=== Books ===
- Dainton, M., Lannutti, P. J., & Texter, L. A. (under contract). Conducting research for professional life. Thousand Oaks, CA: Sage.
- Dainton, M., & Zelley, E. D. (2014/2010/2005). Applying communication theory for professional life: A practical introduction, 3rd ed. Thousand Oaks, CA: Sage. (3rd edition in press)
- Canary, D.J., & Dainton, M. (Eds.). (2003). Maintaining relationships through communication: Relational, contextual, and cultural variations. Hillsdale, NJ: Lawrence Erlbaum and Associates.

=== Peer-reviewed journal articles ===
- Dainton, M., Correa, G., Kohr, S., & Taormina, M. (in press). Public perceptions of organizational social media use: A uses and gratifications approach. Journal of New Communications Research.
- Stewart, M., Dainton, M., Goodboy, A.K. (2014). Maintaining relationships on Facebook: Associations with uncertainty, jealousy, and satisfaction. Communication Reports, 27, 23–36.
- Dainton, M., & Berkoski, L. (2013). Positive and negative maintenance behaviors, jealousy, and Facebook: Impacts on college students’ romantic relationships. Pennsylvania Communication Annual, 69, 35–50.
- Dainton, M. (2013). Relationship maintenance on Facebook: Development of a measure, relationship to general maintenance, and relationship satisfaction. College Student Journal, 47, 113–121.
- Dainton, M., Dunleavy, K.N., Aylor, B., & Pampaloni, A. (2012). Message Design Logics and student grade complaints: An analysis of student goals in emotional confrontations. Pennsylvania Communication Annual, 68, 10–38.
- Dainton, M. (2008). The use of relationship maintenance behaviors as a mechanism to explain the decline in marital satisfaction among parents. Communication Reports, 21, 33–45.
- Dainton, M., & Gross, J. (2008). The use of negative strategies for relationship maintenance. Communication Research Reports, 25, 179–191.
- Dainton, M. (2007). Attachment and marital maintenance. Communication Quarterly, 55, 283–298.
- Aylor, B., & Dainton, M. (2004). Biological sex and psychological gender as predictors of routine and strategic relational maintenance. Sex Roles, 50, 689–697.
- Dainton, M. (2003). Equity and uncertainty in relational maintenance. Western Journal of Communication, 67, 164–186.
- Dainton, M., & Aylor, B.A. (2002). Routine and strategic maintenance efforts: Behavioral patterns, variations associated with relational length, and the prediction of relational characteristics. Communication Monographs, 69, 52–66.
- Dainton, M., & Aylor, B.A. (2002). Communication channels in the maintenance of long-distance relationships. Communication Research Reports, 19, 118–129.
- Dainton, M., & Aylor, B.A. (2001). A relational uncertainty analysis of jealousy, trust, and the maintenance of long-distance versus geographically-close relationships. Communication Quarterly, 49, 172–188.
- Aylor, B.A., & Dainton, M. (2001). Antecedents in romantic jealousy experience, expression, and goals. Western Journal of Communication, 65, 370–391.
- Dainton, M. (2000). Maintenance behaviors, expectations, and satisfaction: Linking the comparison level to relational maintenance. Journal of Social and Personal Relationships, 17, 827-842
- Dainton, M. & Stafford, L. (2000). Predicting maintenance enactment from relational schemata, spousal behavior, and relational characteristics. Communication Research Reports, 17, 171–180.
- Stafford, L., Dainton, M., & Haas, S. (2000). Measuring routine and strategic relational maintenance: Scale development, sex versus gender roles, and the prediction of relational characteristics. Communication Monographs, 67, 306–323.
- Dainton, M. (1998). Everyday interaction in marital relationships: Variations in relative importance and event duration. Communication Reports, 11, 101–110.
- Dainton, M., Stafford, L., & Canary, D.J. (1994). Maintenance strategies and physical affection as predictors of love, liking, and satisfaction in marriage. Communication Reports, 7, 88–98.
- Dainton, M. (1993). The myths and misconceptions of the stepmother identity: Descriptions and prescriptions for identity management. Family Relations, 42, 93–98.
- Dainton, M., & Stafford, L. (1993). Routine maintenance behaviors: A comparison of relationship type, partner similarity, and sex differences. Journal of Social and Personal Relationships, 10, 255–271.

=== Book chapters ===
- Dainton, M. (2012). How do we maintain relationships? In A.K. Goodboy and K. Shultz (Eds.). Introduction to Communication Studies: Translating Communication Scholarship into Meaningful Practice (pp. 191–201). Dubuque, IA: Kendall-Hunt.
- Dainton, M. (2007). Sex versus gender in relationship maintenance. In L.B. Arnold (Ed.) Family communication: Theory and research (pp. 173–180). Boston: Allyn & Bacon.
- Canary, D.J., & Dainton, M. (2006). Maintaining relationships through communication. In A. Vangelisti & D. Perlman (Eds.) The Cambridge Handbook of Personal Relationships (pp. 2256–2312). New York: Cambridge University Press.
- Dainton, M., & Zelley, E. (2005). Social exchange theories: Interdependence and Equity. In D.O. Braithwaite & L.A. Baxter (Eds.) Engaging Theories in Family Communication: Multiple Perspectives (pp. 243–259). Thousand Oaks, CA: Sage.
- Dainton, M. (2005). Cat Walk Conversations: Everyday communication in dating relationships. In J.T. Wood and S. Duck (Eds.) Composing relationships: Communication in everyday life (pp. 36–45). New York: Wadsworth.
- Dainton, M. (2003). Erecting a Framework for Understanding Relational Maintenance: An Epilogue. In D.J. Canary & M. Dainton (Eds.), Maintaining relationships through communication: Relational, contextual, and cultural variations (pp. 299–321). Hillsdale, NJ: Lawrence Erlbaum and Associates.
- Dainton, M., Zelley, E., & Langan, E. (2003). Maintaining friendships across the lifespan. In D.J. Canary & M. Dainton (Eds.), Maintaining relationships through communication: Relational, contextual, and cultural variations (pp. 79–102). Hillsdale, NJ: Lawrence Erlbaum and Associates.
- Dainton, M. (1999). African-American, European-American, and Biracial couples’ meanings for and experiences in marriage. In T.J. Socha and R. Diggs (Eds.), Family communication in cultural perspective: Spanning African American and European American Worlds (pp. 147–165). Hillsdale, NJ: Lawrence Erlbaum Associates.
- Dainton, M. (1995). Basic principles of interpersonal communication theory. In R.L. Hartman and L. Texter (Eds.), Advanced interpersonal communication (pp. 1–15). Dubuque, IA: Kendall-Hunt.
- Pohl, G.M., & Dainton, M. (1995). Attraction in interpersonal relationships. In R.L. Hartman and L. Texter (Eds.), Advanced interpersonal communication (pp. 113–130). Dubuque, IA: Kendall-Hunt.
- Dainton, M. (1995). Relationship escalation, maintenance, and dissolution. In R.L. Hartman and L. Texter (Eds.), Advanced interpersonal communication (pp. 131–148). Dubuque, IA: Kendall-Hunt.
- Stafford, L., & Dainton, M. (1995). Parent-child interaction within the family system. In T.J. Socha and G. Stamp (Eds.), Parents, children, and communication: Frontiers of theory and research (pp. 3–21). Hillsdale, NJ: Lawrence Erlbaum Associates.
- Stafford, L., & Dainton, M. (1994). The dark side of "normal" family interaction. In W.R. Cupach and B.H. Spitzberg (Eds.), The dark side of interpersonal communication (pp. 259–280). Hillsdale, NJ: Lawrence Erlbaum Associates.
