= Michael Kimmel =

American sociologist (born 1951)

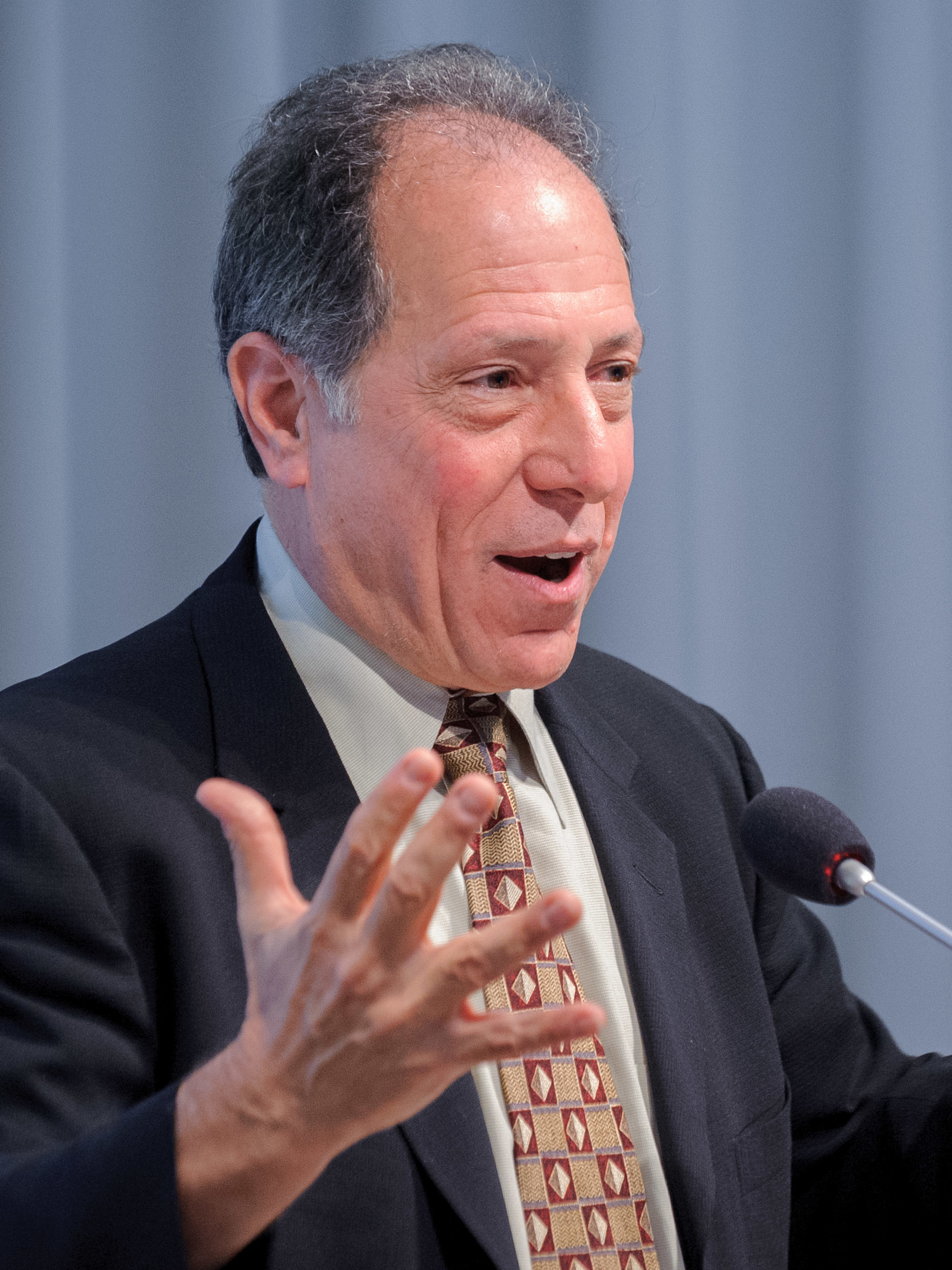
- 2012
- Born: Michael Scott Kimmel; February 26, 1951 (age 75); New York City, U.S.

Academic background
- Education: Vassar College (A.B.); Brown University (M.A.); University of California, Berkeley (Ph.D.)
- Thesis: Absolutism and its discontents: fiscal crisis and political opposition in seventeenth century France and England (1981)

Academic work
- Institutions: Stony Brook University
- Main interests: Gender studies, men's studies, masculinities, men and feminism
- Website: michaelkimmel.com

Notes
- Spouse Amy Aronson

Michael Scott Kimmel (born February 26, 1951) is an American retired sociologist specializing in gender studies. He was Distinguished Professor of Sociology at Stony Brook University in New York and is the founder and editor of the academic journal Men and Masculinities. Kimmel is a spokesman of the National Organization for Men Against Sexism (NOMAS) and a longtime feminist. In 2013, he founded the Center for the Study of Men and Masculinities at Stony Brook University, where he is executive director. In 2018 he was publicly accused of sexual harassment. He filed for retirement while Title IX charges were pending; no charges were subsequently filed.

== Background ==
Born into a secular Jewish family in New York City, Kimmel earned an A.B. with distinction from Vassar College in 1972; an M.A. from Brown University in 1974; and Ph.D. from the University of California, Berkeley in 1981 with a dissertation titled: Absolutism and its Discontents: Fiscal Crisis and Political Opposition in Seventeenth Century France and England.

Before joining the Stony Brook University faculty in 1987, Kimmel worked as assistant professor of sociology at Rutgers University from 1982 to 1986 as well as visiting assistant professor at New York University. He returned to his alma mater, the University of California, Berkeley, where he was visiting professor from 1992 to 1994. In the academic year 1992–1993, he was voted "Best Professor" on campus by The Daily Californian.

== Scholarship ==
Kimmel is considered a leading figure in the academic subfield of men's studies. He has written numerous books on gender and masculinities including Men's Lives (2010, 8th edition), The Gendered Society (2011, 4th edition), Manhood: a Cultural History (2012, 3rd edition), and Guyland: The Perilous World Where Boys Become Men (2008). He has co-edited The Handbook of Studies on Men and Masculinities (2005) and Men and Masculinities: a Social, Cultural and Historical Encyclopedia (2004) which was named "Best of Reference 2004" by the New York Public Library. Moreover, he is the editor of a series on genders and sexualities at New York University Press. In 1992–1993, Kimmel founded the journal Masculinities which was associated with the American Men's Studies Association. The journal was a precursor to the journal Men and Masculinities which was picked up by SAGE Publications in 1998 and became one of the first academic journals focused on men, with Kimmel as its editor.

In 2004, Kimmel was one of 15 scholars chosen for innovative scholarship by the Carnegie Corporation of New York. His research title was "Globalization and its Mal(e)contents: The Gendered Moral and Political Economy of the Extreme Right".

In an article about a "fight club" in Menlo Park, California, Kimmel remarked that there was a sadomasochistic thread running through them, and said they "are the male version of the girls who cut themselves. [...] All day long these guys think they're the captains of the universe, technical wizards. They're brilliant but empty. [...] They want to feel differently. They want to get hit, they want to feel something real."

== Personal life ==
Kimmel is married to the journalism and media studies academic Amy Aronson. The couple has one son.

== Accusations of sexual harassment and retirement ==
Just before receiving the American Sociological Association's Jessie Bernard Award in 2018, Kimmel was accused of sexual harassment. Soon after, the Chronicle of Higher Education published an article that outlined allegations, including those of a former graduate student who described Kimmel suggesting they have sex six weeks into her graduate course, and later in her career. The Chronicle article also included a statement by Kimmel, provided by the American Sociological Association, in which he delayed receipt of the award, giving his accusers six months to file a complaint with the American Sociological Association's Committee on Professional Ethics. Kimmel filed for retirement as charges from a Title IX investigation were pending. No charges from Title IX were ever filed. Since that time one of Kimmel's former graduate students accused him of using outdated language to describe the trans community, discussing pornography in work-related settings, and assigning non-work related tasks to his advisees.

== Selected publications ==
=== Books ===
- Kimmel, Michael (1988). Absolutism and its Discontents: State and Society in 17th Century France and England. New Brunswick, New Jersey: Transaction. ISBN 978-0-88738-180-5.
- Kimmel, Michael (1990). Revolution: A Sociological Interpretation. Philadelphia: Temple University Press. ISBN 978-0-87722-736-6.
- Kimmel, Michael (1991). Men Confront Pornography. New York: Crown. ISBN 978-0-517-56931-3.
- Kimmel, Michael (1992). Against the Tide: Pro-Feminist Men in the U.S., 1776–1990. Boston, Mass.: Beacon Press. ISBN 978-0-8070-6760-4.
- Kimmel, Michael; Danuta Walters, Suzanna. Intersections: transdisciplinary perspectives on genders and sexualities. New York: New York University Press. OCLC 800925019.
- Kimmel, Michael, ed. (1995). The Politics of Manhood. Philadelphia: Temple University Press. ISBN 978-1-56639-365-2.
- Kimmel, Michael, ed. (1996) [1987]. Changing Men: New Directions in the Study of Men and Masculinity. Newbury Park, California: SAGE Publications. ISBN 978-0-8039-2996-8.
- Kimmel, Michael; Aronson, Amy, eds. (2004). Men & Masculinities: A Social, Cultural, and Historical Encyclopedia. Santa Barbara, California: ABC-CLIO. ISBN 978-1-57607-774-0.
- Kimmel, Michael; Hearn, Jeff; Connell, Raewyn, eds. (2005). Handbook of Studies on Men and Masculinities. Thousand Oaks, Calif.: SAGE Publications. ISBN 978-0-7619-2369-5.
- Kimmel, Michael (2005). The Gender of Desire: Essays on Masculinity. Albany, New York: State University of New York Press. ISBN 978-0-7914-6337-6.
- Kimmel, Michael (2008). Guyland: The Perilous World Where Boys Become Men. New York: Harper. ISBN 978-0-06-083135-6.
- Kimmel, Michael; Ferber, Abby L., eds. (2010) [2003]. Privilege: a reader (2nd ed.). Boulder, Colorado: Westview Press. ISBN 978-0-8133-4426-3.
- Kimmel, Michael (2010). Misframing men: the politics of contemporary masculinities. New Brunswick, New Jersey: Rutgers University Press. ISBN 978-0-8135-4762-6.
- Kimmel, Michael; Messner, Michael (2010) [1989]. Men's Lives (8th ed.). Boston, Mass.: Allyn & Bacon. ISBN 978-0-205-69294-1.
- Kimmel, Michael (2011) [2000]. The gendered society (4th ed.). New York: Oxford University Press. ISBN 978-0-19-539902-8.
- Kimmel, Michael; Aronson, Amy (2011). Sociology now: the essentials (2nd ed.). Boston: Allyn & Bacon. ISBN 978-0-205-73199-2.
- Kimmel, Michael (2012) [1996]. Manhood in America: A Cultural History (3rd ed.). New York: Oxford University Press. ISBN 978-0-19-978155-3.
- Kimmel, Michael (2013). Angry White Men: American Masculinity at the End of an Era. New York: Nation Books. ISBN 978-1-56-858696-0.
- Kimmel, Michael (2018). Healing from Hate: How Young Men Get Into―and Out of―Violent Extremism. University of California Press. ISBN 978-0520292635.
- Kimmel, Michael (2026). Playmakers: The Jewish Entrepreneurs Who Created the Toy Industry in America. W. W. Norton & Company. ISBN 978-1324105282.

=== Articles and Chapters ===
- Kimmel, Michael S. (September 1987). "Men's responses to feminism at the turn of the century". Gender & Society. 1 (3): 261–283. doi:10.1177/089124387001003003. JSTOR 189564. S2CID 145428652.
- Kimmel, Michael S. (1994). "Masculinity as Homophobia: Fear, Shame and Silence in the Construction of Gender Identity". In Brod, Harry; Kaufman, Michael (eds.). Theorizing Masculinities. Newbury Park: Sage Publications. pp. 119–141. ISBN 9780803949041.
- Kimmel, Michael S. (May–June 2001). "The kindest un-cut: feminism, Judaism, and my son's foreskin". Tikkun. 16 (3): 43–48. Archived from the original on June 14, 2016.
- Kimmel, Michael S. (November 2002). "'Gender symmetry' in domestic violence: a substantive and methodological research review". Violence Against Women. 8 (11): 1332–1363. doi:10.1177/107780102237407. S2CID 74249845. Pdf.
- Kimmel, Michael S.; Smith, Tyson (Spring 2005). "The hidden discourse of masculinity in gender discrimination law". Signs: Journal of Women in Culture and Society. 30 (3): 1827–1849. doi:10.1086/427524. S2CID 145298430.
- Kimmel, Michael S.; Llewellyn, Cheryl (2012). "Homosexuality, gender nonconformity, and the neoliberal state". Journal of Homosexuality. 59 (7): 1087–1094. doi:10.1080/00918369.2012.699865. PMID 22925062. S2CID 7117158.
- Kimmel, Michael S. (Summer 2012). "When history intervenes". Contexts. 11 (3): 80. doi:10.1177/1536504212456192. S2CID 147535060.
- Kimmel, Michael S.; Coston, Bethany M. (2013). "White men as the new victims: reverse discrimination cases and the men's rights movement". Nevada Law Journal. 13 (2): 5.
