= Amy Aronson =

American journalist

- Born: Amy Beth Aronson; November 9, 1962 (age 63); United States
- Spouse: Michael Kimmel

Academic background
- Thesis: Understanding equals: audience and articulation in the early American women's magazine (1996)

Academic work
- Institutions: Fordham University
- Main interests: Journalism, media studies
- Website: fordham.edu/info/29829/cms_faculty_and_staff/4666/amy_aronson

Amy Beth Aronson (born November 9, 1962) is a Professor of Journalism and Media Studies at Fordham University.

== Education ==
Aronson gained her Ph.D. in 1996 from Columbia University.

== Career ==
Aronson specializes in media history, with a focus on American magazines and periodical literature. Within that frame, her primary research interest is gender, including both femininity and masculinity studies. A scholar-practitioner, she has published both scholarly and journalistic work on issues of gender, diversity, journalism history and American culture. She has worked as the editor of several magazines, including Working Woman and Ms., and has published work in BusinessWeek, Global Journalist, and the Sunday supplement of the Boston Globe. She examined the history of early American women's magazines in her book "Taking Liberties". Her article "Everything Old is New Again: How the 'New' User-Generated Magazine Takes Us Back to the Future." won Best Article of the Year Award from the American Journalism Historians Association.

== Selected bibliography ==
- Aronson, Amy; Kimmel, Michael, eds. (2004). Men & Masculinities: A Social, Cultural, and Historical Encyclopedia. Santa Barbara, Calif.: ABC-CLIO. ISBN 978-1-57607-774-0.
- Aronson, Amy; Kimmel, Michael (2011). Sociology now: the essentials (2nd ed.). Boston: Allyn & Bacon. ISBN 978-0-205-73199-2.
