= Tyriq Withers =

American actor (born 1998)

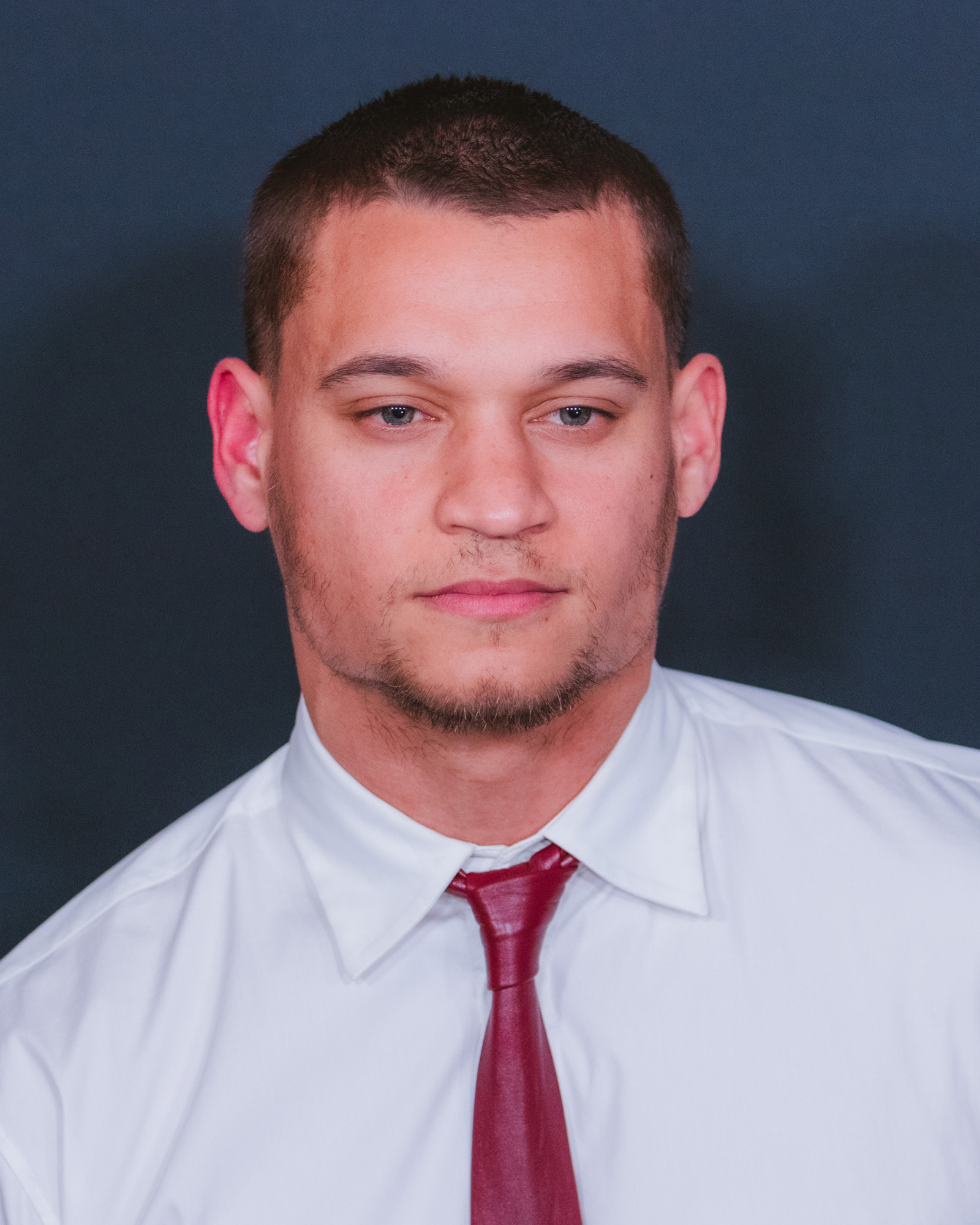
- Withers in 2026
- Born: Tyriq Leshon Withers; July 15, 1998 (age 28); Jacksonville, Florida, U.S.
- Education: Florida State University
- Occupation: Actor
- Years active: 2021–present
- Height: 6 ft 5 in (1.96 m)

Tyriq Leshon Withers (born July 15, 1998) is an American actor. Withers began acting in 2021, appearing in short films and episodic television series such as The CW's Legacies, Tell Me Lies, and The Game. In 2022, Withers had his breakout role as "Aaron" in an episode of Donald Glover's FX comedic-drama Atlanta titled "Rich Wigga, Poor Wigga". He played Teddy Spencer in the slasher film I Know What You Did Last Summer (2025) and had leading roles in the films Him (2025) and Reminders of Him (2026).

== Early life and education ==
Withers was born on July 15, 1998, in Jacksonville, Florida, to Leon Withers, Jr. and Kimberly Hart. His father is of African-American descent and his mother is of European descent. He has a sister, Cayla and had an older brother, Kionte, who passed away in a car crash in 2021.

Withers attended Paxon School for Advanced Studies in Jacksonville, and attended Florida State University where he was part of the 2017 Florida State Seminoles football team and played as a wide receiver. He graduated with degrees in business and marketing in May 2020. While at Florida State, Withers became a member of Alpha Phi Alpha fraternity.

== Career ==
Withers's first major role came in 2022 when he played one of the leading roles opposite Kevin Samuels in "Rich Wigga, Poor Wigga", an episode of the semi-anthology series Atlanta. Withers also landed recurring roles in both The Game as Connor Tibbs and as Tim in Tell Me Lies. Withers co-starred in the I Know What You Did Last Summer sequel, alongside Chase Sui Wonders and Madelyn Cline, which was released in July 2025. That same year, he also starred in the supernatural horror film Him opposite Marlon Wayans.

In 2026, Withers starred in the romance film Reminders of Him, an adaption of the Colleen Hoover novel of the same name. The film opened to mixed reviews from critics, however was successful in the box office. He is set to star in the Amazon MGM romantic comedy Love Love opposite Isabel May. He is also set to appear in the revenge flick Family Secrets alongside Eric Dane and Thomas Doherty.

== Filmography ==
=== Film ===
Year	Title	Role	Notes	Refs.
2021	Horror Noire	Cornelius		
2022	Senior Year	Basketball Bro	Uncredited	
2024	Don't Tell Mom the Babysitter's Dead	Rock		
2025	I Know What You Did Last Summer	Theodore "Teddy" Spencer		
2025	Him	Cameron "Cam" Cade		
2026	Reminders of Him	Ledger Ward		
TBA	Family Secrets		Post-production	
TBA	Love Love		Filming	

=== Television ===
Year	Title	Role	Notes
2021	Legacies	Wolf Tour Student	Episode: "To Whom It May Concern"
2021-2022	The Game	Connor Tibbs	7 episodes
2022	Tell Me Lies	Tim	Recurring cast: 6 episodes
2022	Atlanta	Aaron	Episode: "Rich Wigga Poor Wigga"
2024	Me	Yates Skurk	7 episodes

=== Audio ===
Year	Title	Role	Notes
2026	The Bodyguard	Special Agent Jackson Brooks	Main role

=== Web series ===
Year	Title	Role	Notes	Refs.
2025	Brittany Broski's Royal Court	Himself/Guest		

== Awards and nominations ==
Year	Award	Category	Nominated work	Result	Refs.
2026	Black Reel Awards	Outstanding Breakthrough Performance	Him	Nominated	
2026	NAACP Image Awards	Outstanding Actor in a Motion Picture	Him	Nominated	
2026	NAACP Image Awards	Outstanding Breakthrough Performance in a Motion Picture	Him	Nominated	
