= Rich Wigga, Poor Wigga =

- Atlanta episode
- Episode no.: Season 3 Episode 9
- Directed by: Donald Glover
- Written by: Donald Glover
- Cinematography by: Stephen Murphy
- Editing by: Isaac Hagy; Kyle Reiter
- Production code: XAA03010
- Original air date: May 12, 2022
- Running time: 27 minutes

Guest appearances
- George Wallace as Greg; Tyriq Withers as Aaron; Rachel Resheff as Kate; Kevin Samuels as Robert S. Lee

Episode chronology
← Previous "New Jazz"	Next → "Tarrare"
- Atlanta season 3

"Rich Wigga, Poor Wigga" is the ninth episode of the third season of the American comedy-drama television series Atlanta. It is the 30th overall episode of the series and was written and directed by series creator and main actor Donald Glover. It was first broadcast on FX in the United States on May 12, 2022.

The series is set in Atlanta and follows Earnest "Earn" Marks, as he tries to redeem himself in the eyes of his ex-girlfriend Van, who is also the mother of their daughter Lottie; as well as his parents and his cousin Alfred, who raps under the stage name "Paper Boi"; and Darius, Alfred's eccentric right-hand man. For the season, the characters find themselves in Europe in the middle of a concert tour. The episode, which was shot in black and white, focuses on a biracial high school student named Aaron, who wants money to go to his dream college. A multimillionaire alumnus promises the high school to pay the college tuition for all black students, and Aaron is tested for his "blackness". Similar to previous episodes, none of the main cast members appear in the episode.

According to Nielsen Media Research, the episode was seen by an estimated 0.225 million household viewers and gained a 0.1 ratings share among adults aged 18–49. The episode received positive reviews from critics. Some praised the episode for its cinematography, Glover's directing and its message; others deemed that it failed to properly tell its message and, as with previous episodes, criticized the absence of the main cast.

This episode marked the final on-screen appearance of Kevin Samuels, who died on May 5, 2022, exactly one week before this episode aired.

== Plot ==
A boy named Aaron (Tyriq Withers) is playing video games and gets into heated arguments with his online team members, and uses racial slurs even though he himself is biracial. The next day while driving to school, Aaron and his black dad listen to a story on the radio about a black teenager dying in a police shooting. Aaron's father tells him that he is not paying for his preferred college, won't fill out the FAFSA and warns him that if he stays at home after high school, Aaron will have to pay rent. This disappoints Aaron, as he wanted to go to the same college as his girlfriend, Kate (Rachel Resheff).

At high school, a millionaire alumnus named Robert S. Lee (Kevin Samuels) appears as a guest speaker. He states he will donate a million dollars to the school and will also pay every senior's college tuition. Aaron and his classmates are delighted, until Lee states that he will only pay for black students. While wandering around the hallways, Aaron is called to a panel where he is questioned to prove his "Blackness". After the questions, they conclude that he is not black and won't give him the money. Aaron calls out the panel for only handing the money to black people, stating he is light-skinned. One of the judges reaffirms that he is white and Aaron leaves.

Aaron gets into an argument with Kate, who reveals that she is aware that he is not going to her college and breaks up with him. Aaron then decides to make a homemade flamethrower and heads to the high school, intending to burn it down. There, he encounters a Nigerian student named Felix, who also came to the school to burn it down with a homemade flamethrower. Felix states he wasn't deemed "Black" even after he and his parents were born in Nigeria, and Aaron states he agrees with the panel that he is not black. They get into a heated debate and both threaten to kill each other with their flamethrowers. They then chase each other, with Aaron accidentally burning his feet while escaping. As Felix finally finds him, he is shot by police officers in the area, who detain Aaron.

In the aftermath, Aaron is arrested. Lee finds Felix being carried away by the ambulance and tells him that getting shot by the police is "the blackest thing", and grants him the money. A year later, Aaron now works at an electronics store, and he uses more AAVE in his speech. Kate runs into him flirting with a customer and is taken aback by his new personality. At first she looks saddened but then perks up after Aaron begins flirting with her. His advances well-received, Aaron then gives the camera a knowing look before the frame freezes and the credits roll.

== Production ==
=== Development ===
"Black and White episode? Yawn. Emmy Bait. Why do they hate black women so much?"

— Official description in the press release for the episode.

In April 2022, FX announced that the ninth episode of the season would be titled "Rich Wigga, Poor Wigga" and that it would be written and directed by series creator and main actor Donald Glover. This was Glover's eighth writing credit, and his sixth directing credit.

=== Casting ===
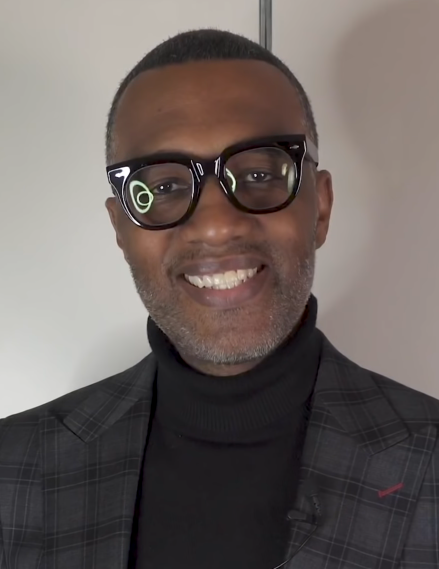
Kevin Samuels guest stars in the episode.

The episode features an appearance by Kevin Samuels as Robert S. Lee, a millionaire alumnus. The episode aired one week after Samuels died on May 5, 2022. Stephen Glover commented on casting Samuels despite the actor facing some controversial remarks, "I'm a Black man, so to me, Kevin Samuels isn't that crazy. He was an old Black man. I think we've all met some version of Kevin Samuels before in our lives. We probably have a family member who's Kevin Samuels." The role was originally offered to Steve Harvey but when the idea fell through, the crew settled on giving the role to Samuels.

== Reception ==
=== Viewers ===
The episode was watched by 0.225 million viewers, earning a 0.1 in the 18-49 rating demographics on the Nielson ratings scale. This means that 0.1 percent of all households with televisions watched the episode. This was a 27% decrease from the previous episode, which was watched by 0.305 million viewers with a 0.1 in the 18-49 demographics.

=== Critical reviews ===
"Rich Wigga, Poor Wigga" received mixed reviews from critics. The review aggregator website Rotten Tomatoes reported a 75% approval rating for the episode, based on 8 reviews with an average rating of 5.5/10.

Michael Martin of The A.V. Club gave the episode a "B" and writing, "A few scenes here rank among the series' most satirically sharp, but the episode foils itself a bit. We've come to expect more from the show than broad satirical strokes, even from the anthological characters. And that's the disadvantage of these standalone episodes — you need to imbue your characters with complete life from scratch for the episode to work; there's no history to fall back on. In other anthological episodes this season, Atlanta has done it artfully, but here, it creates a character that's too complicated for the script."

Alan Sepinwall of Rolling Stone wrote, "If Glover wanted to go full anthology with a new project — to succeed where Jordan Peele mostly didn't with his 2019 Twilight Zone revival — he has more than earned that right. But it is getting harder with each Season Three digression to avoid wishing that we were back in the familiar company of Al, Darius, Earn, and/or Van, regardless of how strange the individual circumstances may be. Let Atlanta be Atlanta, no matter where a season may be set."

Jordan Taliha McDonald of Vulture gave the episode a 2 star rating out of 5 and wrote, "I... see this episode as a crucial sample of the show's marrow, and the results show that provocation is the cancer in the lifeblood of the series." Lex Pryor of The Ringer wrote, "The thing that most sticks out at this stage in the season is: Does it even matter? In an age when film and television worship the idols of plot, interconnectivity, and theory, does Atlanta have to have a point beyond whatever was last on screen? Do we need to know the exact states of Van's or Darius's headspaces? Or if Al and Earn can balance creative ambition and financial stability (or a lack thereof)? The show was gone for four years. A lot has changed. That it took this form in its return seems to be an argument in and of itself. If the penultimate episode is any indication, the message is that there's no right way to do this, that everything's context dependent. In 'Rich Wigga, Poor Wigga', as seems to be the new normal on Atlanta, race is fickle and right is an abstraction."

Deshawn Thomas of /Film wrote, "It just makes no sense that, four years after season 2, we've hardly seen the Black characters we've come to love. The show has morphed into a half-assed attempt at an anthology about white privilege that doesn't even have the balls to really go there because it continues and has dedicated four episodes in a 10-episode season to showcasing white actors and white perspectives. Forgive me if I don't f*** with it anymore because it feels like a convoluted minstrel show at this point, and so the praise it is receiving for being "deep" is nauseating and laughable." Kyndall Cunningham of The Daily Beast was also critical, writing "With all the ideas this episode tries to tackle and muddles in the process, it seems like a standard episode of Atlanta featuring the show's cast might have been a safer bet. But fans, like myself, may just have to accept that this show is a run-of-the-mill anthology series about racism now and buckle in for the next season, or simply not watch it at all."
