= Angry white male =

Racial stereotype used in politics

"Angry white males" or "angry white men" is a term used in the English-speaking world to describe white men who hold right-wing views and oppose progressive or liberal beliefs and policies. The term is most commonly used in American and Australian politics. In the United States, the term came into increasing use following white male backlash to the civil rights movement and second-wave feminism of the mid-20th century which gained more rights for white women and people of color in American society, in addition to immigration, multiculturalism and LGBTQ rights. Angry white men often blame their problems on non-whites, particularly non-white immigrants, Jews, and African Americans.

== Theory ==
One of the major American political movements of 1992 was women's rights. A reactionary backlash described by The Atlantic as the "Revolt of the Angry White Male" arose against the women's movement. The revolt of the angry white male quickly brought up questions and concerns that have long since haunted American politics. Although, the primary concern regarding these questions has occurred since women's suffrage, at least since the 1920s around women's rights to vote, they became prevalent again in the 1990s. While the question was initially related to whether women would vote differently from men if given suffrage, otherwise known as the right to vote, the gender pay gap gave new salience to women's rights issues. While the issue of women's rights was a prevalent in the 1990s the movement of "Angry White Males" has grown substantially since.

More recently, Professor Bob Pease's view of the theory surrounding Angry White Male voters has stated that they see themselves as a voting bloc with their gender under attack which underscores why Angry White Male voters are more likely to feel politically disenfranchised and to therefore vote for right wing populist parties as a result.

In Pease's view, the resultant right wing populist political movement of Angry White Males is often summarized as having experiential periods of loss both psychologically and sociologically surrounding their sense of perceived losses of the traditions of men and their perceived "emasculation". Pease suggests that the populist polemics of Angry White Males' claim to make men great again by opposing equal rights and restoring hegemony to its masculinist right.

== United States ==
The term commonly refers to a political voting bloc that emerged in the early 1990s as a reaction to perceived injustices faced by white men in the face of affirmative action quotas in the workplace, much like how the Reagan Democrat bloc emerged a decade earlier. Angry white men are characterized as having animosity toward young people, people of color, women or other minorities, and liberalism in general. Donald Trump's male supporters have been described by some political commentators as angry white men.

Speaking in 2008, then-senator and future president-elect Barack Obama spoke of the small town residents left behind by successive administrations, saying that he felt it was "not surprising when they get bitter, they cling to guns or religion or antipathy toward people who aren't like them or anti-immigrant or anti-trade sentiment as a way to explain their frustrations". In 2015, he referenced male blue-collar workers having what he saw as a "justified, but just misdirected" sense of fear, frustration and anger, and believed that Donald Trump's 2016 candidacy for presidency was taking advantage of that sentiment. In the 2012 RNC, South Carolina senator Lindsey Graham said, "The demographics race we’re losing badly. We’re not generating enough angry white guys to stay in business for the long term."

== Australia ==
The concept also appeared during Australia's 1998 federal elections. New political parties appeared in that election due to the preexisting fathers' rights movement in Australia. These included the Abolish Family Support/Family Court Party and the Family Law Reform Party. Similar to the usage of the term in the United States, the Australian men categorized as angry white men opposed what they perceived as the feminist agenda. These political parties were created as a reaction to the historic number of women elected to the House of Representatives. Members of these groups claimed that "feminists have entrenched themselves in positions of power and influence in government and are using their power to victimise men".

Senator Eric Abetz from the centre-right Liberal Party, arguing against Section 18C of the Racial Discrimination Act 1975, said in 2016 that it was "passing strange" that the Australian Human Rights Commission does not seem to care about what he perceives as "racist terminology" such as angry white man, but does care if another color is used to describe someone. "One cannot help but think that the term 'white' can only refer to skin colour and therefore [you] are making reference to a skin colour [and] one assumes it must have been on the basis of race that the comment was made", he commented.

== In popular culture ==
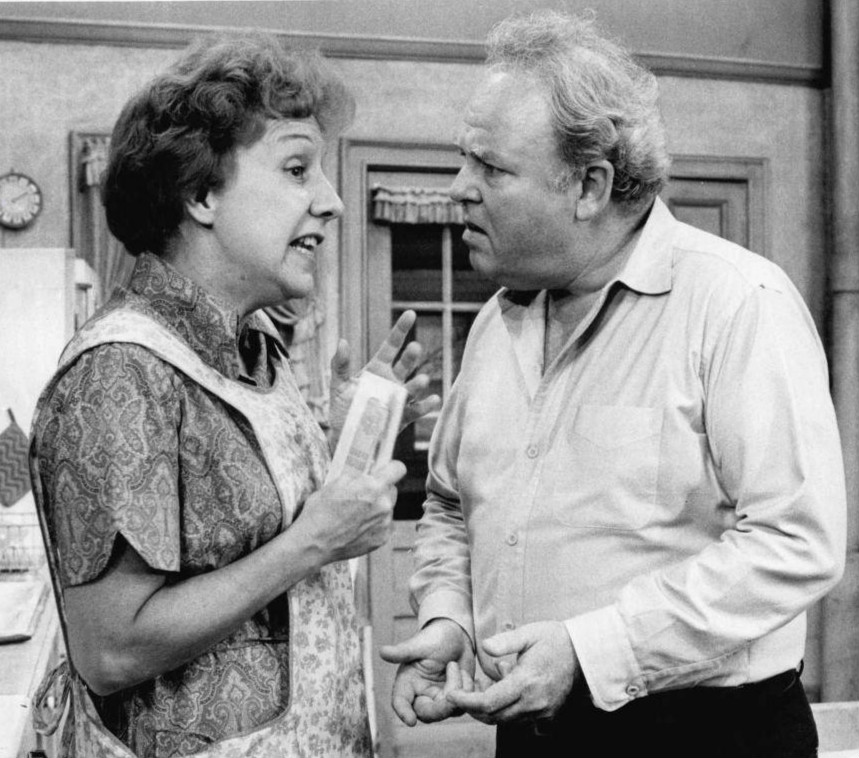
Carroll O'Connor as Archie Bunker in the 1970s American television sitcom All in the Family, with Jean Stapleton as his wife Edith

The term is applied to those believed to be opposed to the civil rights movement and second-wave feminism.

The films Joe, Raging Bull, Falling Down, Cobb, God Bless America, Taxi Driver, Joker, and Clint Eastwood's performances in Dirty Harry and Gran Torino have been described as an exploration of the angry white man. In particular, the protagonist of Falling Down (a divorced, laid-off defense worker who descends via chance and choice into a spiral of increasing rage and violence) was widely reported upon as a representative of the stereotype.

The character Archie Bunker from the TV sitcoms All in the Family and Archie Bunker's Place "turned the angry white male into a cultural icon", according to CBS News. Walter White in the television series Breaking Bad has also been described as an "angry white male".

== See also ==
- Angry White Men
- Stereotypes of white Americans
- Gammon (insult)
- Redneck
- Karen (slang)
- Angry black woman
- Black Buck
