= Guyland =

2008 book by Michael Kimmel

- Author: Michael Kimmel
- Subject: Sociology
- Genre: Non-fiction
- Publisher: Harper
- Publication date: 2008
- Media type: Print (hardcover and paperback)
- Pages: 356
- ISBN: 978-0-06-083134-9

Guyland: The Perilous World Where Boys Become Men (ISBN 978-0-06-083134-9) is a book by Michael Kimmel, published in 2008. The book covers the culture for young men transitioning from adolescence to adulthood.

Kimmel interviewed 400 men aged 16 to 26 and identified a trend whereby young men increasingly delay adulthood. Kimmel notes that, in 1960, almost 70% of American men had by the age of 30 left home, completed their educations, found a partner and started work. By comparison, today less than a third of men reach these milestones before their thirties. Kimmel writes that young men are reluctant to grow up because they "see grown-up life as such a loss". In order to avoid the responsibilities of adulthood, young men retreat into a homosocial world Kimmel terms "Guyland", a social space and a stage of life where "guys gather to be guys with each other, unhassled by the demands of parents, girlfriends, jobs, kids, and the other nuisances of adult life". Young white men, in particular, feel a sense of "thwarted entitlement", believing that women and minorities have taken away traditionally white male jobs and positions.
