= Bob Beckman =

American investment adviser

- Born: Robert C. Beckman; August 25, 1934; New York, US
- Died: December 6, 2007 (aged 73)
- Occupation: Investment commentator
- Known for: The Downwave (1983), Into the Upwave (1988)

Robert C. Beckman (August 25, 1934 – December 6, 2007) was an American investment adviser, commentator, and author, who achieved fame in the United Kingdom in the 1980s through his media appearances and his books The Downwave (1983) and Into the Upwave (1988). As a young man he made, and quickly lost, a fortune on the stock market. The experience permanently disillusioned him with equity investment and he became known for his forecasts of doom for the stock market and British house prices which were largely proved wrong.

== Early life ==
Robert Beckman was born in New York on August 25, 1934. His family were poor but he managed to earn a degree in economics.

== Financial and media career ==
Beckman had an early career as a banker and stockbroker on Wall Street in the 1950s. He later claimed to have made a million dollars by the age of 26, and to have lost it all by the age of 27. The experience permanently disillusioned him with the stock market and he thereafter adopted a cautious approach to investment that was slow but certain, saying that it took him more than 13 years to make his next million.

In 1963, Beckman moved to the United Kingdom where he began advising on investments and bought the Investors' Bulletin newsletter in 1968 when it had just 12 subscribers. He sold it in 1996.

In the 1970s, Beckman achieved publicity after claiming that his Old English Sheepdog, William, was a successful stock market investor. Beckman explained "The dog is called William of Arethyn, which means son of the bear, it makes most of its money in bear markets." Beckman claimed to read out the names of companies and to buy or sell according to signals given by William. On one occasion, according to Beckman, William snatched the chart for Hammerson from his hand and tore it to pieces which Beckman took as a sell signal. He subsequently shorted the stock to his profit. It later transpired that the dog was actually owned by Beckman's former assistant, who with Beckman claimed that the share trading profits that had been made belonged exclusively to William and therefore there could be no tax on them. A commentator in Taxation magazine agreed that as William was neither a "legal entity" or a "person" in law, he probably didn't owe any tax but neither could he own money, and therefore his whole capital of around £100,000 belonged to the British crown.

In the 1980s Beckman rented a three-floor penthouse at the top of a Barbican tower for £25,000 per annum. In the late 1980s, he moved to The Water Gardens, on Edgware Road, London.

Beckman began a regular morning investment segment on LBC radio, which he held for 12 years, and also appeared on TV-am. In 1982, he founded the Beckman International Capital Accumulator Unit Trust, aiming for a steady return from fixed interest bonds and gilts. In 1983, Beckman appeared in the television film Prophet of Doom.

In 1991, Beckman was warned by his professional regulator, FIMBRA, after the Board of Deputies of British Jews complained to them about an article in his newsletter titled "The Zionist Factor", which claimed that the two World Wars and the first Gulf War were caused by a Jewish conspiracy of American and German bankers.

== Forecasts and writing ==
Beckman was consistently pessimistic about the outlook for the stock market and British house prices. In 1979 he predicted that property prices would fall by 50% within three years; they did not. In 1983, in The Downwave, which sold 500,000 copies, he predicted a second Great Depression. He followed this up with recommendations for how to beat the coming depression and a history of financial crashes. In 1987 the stock market did crash on Black Monday but the Financial Times noted that share prices after the crash were still about twice as high as they had been in 1983. In 1988, he produced Into the Upwave, a wide-ranging work of over 600 dense pages, in which he continued to forecast a house price collapse but also explained how to prosper in the long term from new trends. In Housequake (1996), Beckman again predicted a property price collapse, saying "There will not be a property boom during the 1990s of any sort." The Times in their 2007 obituary of Beckman, noted that house prices had more than tripled since that prediction.

Beckman was often said to be a Cassandra for prophesying doom, but he told The Times in April 1987 that he was simply a realist who believed that wealth could not come against a background of high unemployment and global economic stagnation. Of the stockmarket, which subsequently crashed in October 1987 on Black Monday, he said "The market is rising because of the 'Greater Fool Theory'. You buy a share in the hope that a greater fool will eventually pay more for it. In the end it is bought by 'The Greatest Fool of All', just before the end. The market is like a balloon, the more air you put in, the nearer you are to bursting point."

== Personal life ==
Beckman married Arlette. From 1987 he was based permanently in Monaco where he appeared on Riviera Radio. In 1992, he wrote of his "opulent lifestyle, shuttling between London, Paris, Monte Carlo and various enclaves on the French Riviera. I enjoy the finest of foods, wines, clothes, cars and boats, while being surrounded by beautiful women".

In 1995, Beckman explained that he had chosen to live in Monaco due to the sophistication of the financial services available there and the tax efficiency of the arrangements possible in the territory, saying: "A long time ago, I was told that the most efficient way for an individual to handle his affairs was to work one place, keep his money in a second place and live in a third place. I live in Monaco. I don't work here, my money is placed elsewhere, but managed from here".

== Death ==
Beckman died of cancer on December 6, 2007.

== Selected publications ==
- Supertiming the unique Elliott Wave System: Keys to anticipating impending stock market action. Library of Investment Study, Los Angeles, Calif., c.1979.
- The Downwave: Surviving the second Great Depression. Milestone Publications, Portsmouth, 1983.
- Beat the Downwave. Milestone Publications, Horndean, Hampshire, 1984.
- Crashes: Why they happen: What to do. Sidgwick & Jackson, London, 1988. ISBN 0283996730
- Into the Upwave: How to prosper from slump to boom. R. Finigan Ed. Milestone Publications, Portsmouth, 1988. (three editions) ISBN 1852651105
- Powertiming. Milestone Publications, Horndean, Hampshire, 1992. ISBN 1852651245
- Housequake: Is this the right time to buy a house? Rushmere Wynne, Leighton Buzzard, 1996. ISBN 0948035463

== See also ==
- Greater fool theory
- Three flags theory
