= Angry White Men =

2013 book

Angry White Men: American Masculinity at the End of an Era
- First edition
- Author: Michael Kimmel
- Language: English
- Published: 2013
- Publisher: Nation Books
- Publication place: United States
- Pages: 320
- ISBN: 978-1-56858-696-0

Angry White Men: American Masculinity at the End of an Era is a sociological critique of the angry white male phenomenon in America by Michael Kimmel, first published in 2013. The book was re-published in April 2017 with a new preface by Kimmel discussing U.S. President Donald Trump.

== Overview ==
Kimmel examines what he describes as the "aggrieved entitlement" of white men in early 21st-century American society. According to Kimmel, many white men, as members of a historically dominant group in America, have reacted to increases in social equality and the loss of economic advantage with overt anger and rage. Written from a scholarly perspective, the book describes various manifestations of this anger, including domestic violence, shootings, involvement in white supremacist groups, and the men's rights and fathers' rights movements. Each chapter of the book discusses a different topic and population of men, including young men and violence, men's rights groups, men's violence toward women, the white working class, and white supremacist groups such as Neo-Nazis.

== Reception ==
Describing the book as a "missed opportunity", the Financial Times's Gary Silverman writes:

The angrier the white man, the more fascinated Kimmel tends to be. As a result, he pays far less attention to the white male followers of the Tea Party – who are playing a central role in US politics today – than to fringe figures ranging from tattooed racial supremacists to 'rampage school shooters'.

Sarah Sobieraj from Tufts University writes that the book will "inspire robust debate in many undergraduate classrooms" but that it "will not, however, be popular with angry white men," noting that it is a "shame" that the men who are represented within the book are likely the men that will not want to read it. Zak Foste from Ohio State University "honors" Kimmel for his work interviewing so many men with whom he disagreed on a fundamental level in order to write this book.

== See also ==
- Male privilege
- Masculinity
- Misogyny
