= Perpetual traveler =

Concept of basing aspects of one's life in different countries

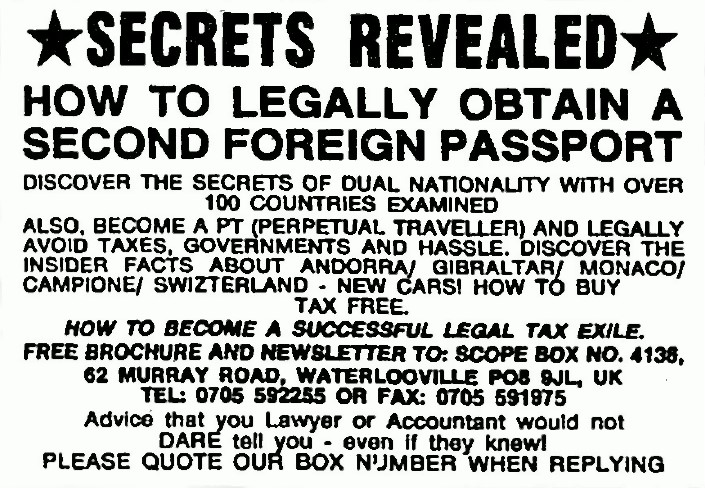
Advertising for second passports and information about becoming a "Perpetual Traveller". Scope, The Times, 1994.

A perpetual traveler (also PT, permanent tourist or prior taxpayer) is a person who bases different aspects of their life in different countries, without spending too long in any one place, under the belief that they can reduce taxes, avoid civic duties, and increase personal freedom. Books and services relating to the PT idea have been a staple of companies that specialise in marketing offshore financial centres, tax avoidance schemes, and personal privacy services.

== Principles ==
The perpetual traveler idea proposes that individuals live in such a way that they are not considered a legal resident of any of the countries in which they spend time or operate. By lacking a legal permanent residence status, the theory goes, they may avoid the legal obligations which accompany residency, such as income and asset taxes, social security contributions, jury duty, and military service. The idea has been described as a "late capitalist nomadism".

== Flag theory ==
The perpetual traveler idea has been presented in terms of flag theory, wherein each flag represents one of the legal jurisdictions under which the perpetual traveller operates. The Three Flags Theory is credited to investment pundit Harry D. Schultz, who proposed that everyone should have a second passport and an address in a tax haven and that their assets should be kept outside their home country. The idea was later expanded to Five Flags to include a place where money was earned and a place for recreation.

Whether to minimize governmental interference (via taxes or otherwise), or to maximize privacy, the theory proposes that each of the following should be in a separate country:

1. Passport and citizenship – in a country that does not tax money earned outside the country or control actions.
2. Legal tax residence – in a tax haven.
3. Business base – where one earns one's money, ideally somewhere with low corporate tax rates.
4. Asset haven – where one keeps one's money, ideally somewhere with low taxation of passive income and capital gains.
5. Playgrounds – where one spends one's money, ideally somewhere with low consumption taxes.

In 1995, financial commentator Bob Beckman commented about his residence in Monaco: "A long time ago, I was told that the most efficient way for an individual to handle his affairs was to work one place, keep his money in a second place and live in a third place. I live in Monaco. I don't work here, my money is placed elsewhere, but managed from here."

== Scope International and W.G. Hill ==
Harry Schultz's ideas were picked up by Scope International Limited of Waterlooville, England (not related to Scope International owned by Standard Chartered Bank), who popularized the idea through a series of books they published under the name of W.G. Hill (William G. Hill) (possibly a pseudonym) in the 1980s and 90s which were sold through classified advertising in The Times. Around 1989, they published PT: A coherent plan for a stress-free, healthy and prosperous life without government interference, taxes or coercion by Hill which was said to have been "inspired and edited by Harry Donald Schultz" and went through up to seven editions. In 1993, they published PT2: The practice: freedom and privacy tactics: A reference handbook by Hill which also went through several editions. Other books published by Scope and said to have been written by Hill include Banking in silence, The Monaco report and Think like a tycoon.

== See also ==
- Global nomad
- Global citizenship
- Passport bro – Social media movement of western men who date or marry women abroad
- Remote work
- Statelessness
- Tax residency
- Tax avoidance
- Tax exile
