= Aggrieved entitlement =

Michael Kimmel, a masculinities scholar and sociologist, coined the term aggrieved entitlement in his (2013) book Angry White Men. He defines aggrieved entitlement as a feeling within privileged groups in America, "...that sense that those benefits to which you believed yourself entitled have been snatched away from you by unseen forces larger and more powerful", scapegoating minority communities.

Aggrieved entitlement is in earlier phases of conceptualization in the social sciences, but may have a positive association to constructs such as racism, transphobia, sexism, authoritarianism, and fear-based xenophobia and a negative association with feminist attitudes, compassionate love, and honesty-humility.

Aggrieved entitlement may also be connected to certain instances of right-wing terrorism, and violence against women or intimate partner violence.

== See also ==
- Entitlement (psychology)
