= Technoculture =

Neologism

Technoculture is a neologism that is not in standard dictionaries but that has some popularity in academia, popularized by editors Constance Penley and Andrew Ross in a 1991 book of essays bearing that title. It refers to the interactions between, and politics of, technology and culture.

== Programs of study ==
"Technoculture" is used by a number of universities to describe subject areas or courses of study. UC Davis, for instance, has a program of technocultural studies. In 2012, the major merged with Film Studies to form Cinema and Techno-Cultural Studies (CaTS), but in 2013 is being reviewed to become Cinema and Technoculture (see below); the University of Western Ontario offers a degree in Media, Information and Technoculture (which they refer to as MIT, offering an "MIT BA"). UC Riverside is in the process of creating a program in technocultural studies beginning with the creation of a graduate certificate program in "Science Fiction and Technoculture Studies."

According to its description, the Georgetown University course English/CCT 691 titled Technoculture from Frankenstein to Cyberpunk, covers the "social reception and representation of technology in literature and popular culture from the Romantic era to the present" and includes "all media, including film, TV, and recent video animation and Web 'zines." The course focuses "mainly on American culture and the way in which machines, computers, and the body have been imagined."

The UC Davis Technocultural Studies department focuses on "transdisciplinary approaches to artistic, cultural and scholarly production in contemporary media and digital arts, community media, and mutual concerns of the arts with the scientific and technological disciplines. In contrast to programs which see technology as the primary driving force, we place questions of poetics, aesthetics, history, politics and the environment at the core of our mission. In other words, we emphasize the 'culture' in Technoculture."

The Technocultural Studies major program is an interdisciplinary integration of current research in cultural history and theory with innovative hands-on production in digital media and "low-tech". It focuses on the fine and performing arts, media arts, community media, literature and cultural studies as they relate to technology and science. Backed by critical perspectives and the latest forms of research and production skills, students enjoy the mobility to explore individual research and expression, project-based collaboration and community engagement.

Technocultural Studies is a fairly new major at UC Davis and is considered a division of Humanities, Arts and Cultural Studies.

- Film Studies and Technocultural Studies majors at UC Davis have merged into Cinema and Technoculture. The faculty have been hard at work on developing this new major, and it is going through the review process. Declared students will be grandfathered in to the existing programs to complete their major. They will also have the option of switching to the new major if they choose. The faculty of UC Davis believes these new additions will improve the program and hope their students take advantage of them.

== Journals ==
Technoculture: An Online Journal of Technology in Society (ISSN 1938-0526) is an independent, interdisciplinary, annual peer-reviewed journal that publishes critical and creative works that explore the ways in which technology impacts society. It uses a broad definition of technology. Founded by Keith Dorwick and Kevin Moberly, it is now edited by Keith Dorwick. Technoculture is a member of the Council of Editors of Learned Journals and is indexed by EBSCOhost and the Modern Language Association.

== People ==
Marshall McLuhan is most known for his concepts of a "global village". In his 1964 book Understanding Media he talks about how media affects society and culture. He also develops a theory about technology being an extension of the body. According to McLuhan, the alphabet is what gave rise to the idea that sight is more important than hearing because in order to communicate one had to be able to see and understand the alphabet.

In her 2008 book Technoculture: The Key Concepts, Debra Benita Shaw "outlines the place of science and technology in today's culture" and "explores the power of scientific ideas, their impact on how we understand the natural world and how successive technological developments have influenced our attitudes to work, art, space, language and the human body."

Clay Shirky writes, teaches, and consults on the social and economic effects of the internet, and especially on places where our social and technological networks overlap. He is on the faculty of NYU's Interactive Telecommunications Program, and has consulted for Nokia, Procter and Gamble, News Corp., the BBC, the United States Navy and Lego. He is also a regular speaker at technology conferences.

In his 1935 essay "The Work of Art in the Age of Mechanical Reproduction" Walter Benjamin attempts to analyze the changed experience of art in modern society. He believes that a reproduction of art lacks presence in time and space and therefore has no aura. Original works of art do have an aura. An aura includes authority, its place in space and time (when it was made), how the piece's physical condition suffered and how it's changed owners over time. An original work of art derives its authenticity from history and what has happened to it over time.

== See also ==
- Cyberculture
