= Masculine beauty ideal =

Socially constructed norms

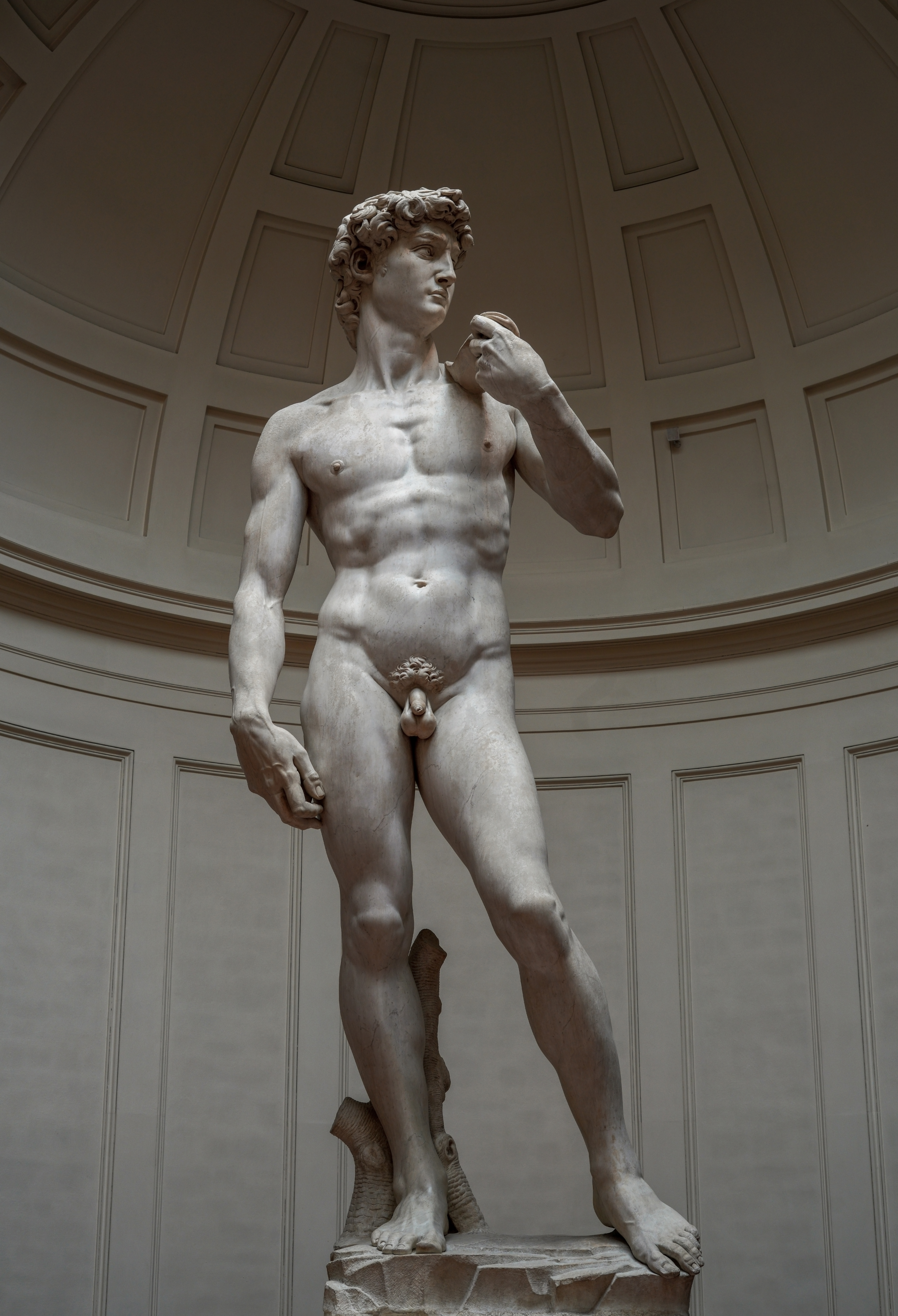
Michelangelo's David is considered a Western symbol of young male beauty and human beauty.

The masculine beauty ideal is a set of cultural beauty standards for men which change based on the historical era and the geographic region. These standards are ingrained in men from a young age to increase their perceived physical attractiveness.

Masculine beauty ideals are mainly rooted in heteronormative beliefs about hypermasculinity, but they heavily influence men of all sexual orientations and gender identities. The masculine beauty ideal traits include but are not limited to: male body shape, height, skin tones, body weight, muscle mass, and genital size. Men oftentimes feel social pressure to conform to these standards in order to feel desirable, and thus elect to alter their bodies through processes such as extreme dieting, genital enlargement, radical fitness regimens, skin whitening, tanning, peptide injecting, bonesmashing, and other bodily surgical modifications.

With a recent rise in technology, the world is more united in the beauty ideals for men, causing a more general view on the "ideal man". This also leads to a rise in the prevalence of these beauty standards for men, causing an increase in procedures to obtain these standards and mental health problems for young men.

== Colonialism ==
Because masculine beauty standards are subjective, they change significantly based on location. A professor of anthropology at the University of Edinburgh, Alexander Edmonds, states that in Western Europe and other colonial societies (Australia, and North and South America), the legacies of slavery and colonialism have resulted in images of beautiful men being "very white."

As new ethnic features were introduced in the west, white features such as fair skin, high nose bridges, and big eyes became a sign of "civilization" and thus became idealized.

== Androgyny ==
Standards of beauty vary based on culture and location. While Western beauty standards emphasize muscled physiques, this is not the case everywhere. In South Korea and other parts of East Asia, the rise of androgynous K-pop bands have led to slim boyish bodies, vibrant hair, and make-up being more sought-after ideals of masculine beauty.

However, even in regions and cultures that idealize androgynous men, men can face backlash for not being masculine enough. For example, in China, it is typically the standard to be androgynous. Despite the standard of androgyny, many male celebrities often face backlash from the general public for being "too feminine" and wearing makeup

== Youthfulness ==
Beauty standards have evolved over time, changing based on various factors. Youth was seen as beautiful in places such as ancient Egypt, with art as an example of this. Egyptian art pieces showed youthful figures in an idealized form. Greek and Roman sculptures continued this theme of idealism but chose to represent beauty through qualities such as muscles and intellect.

== Weight ==
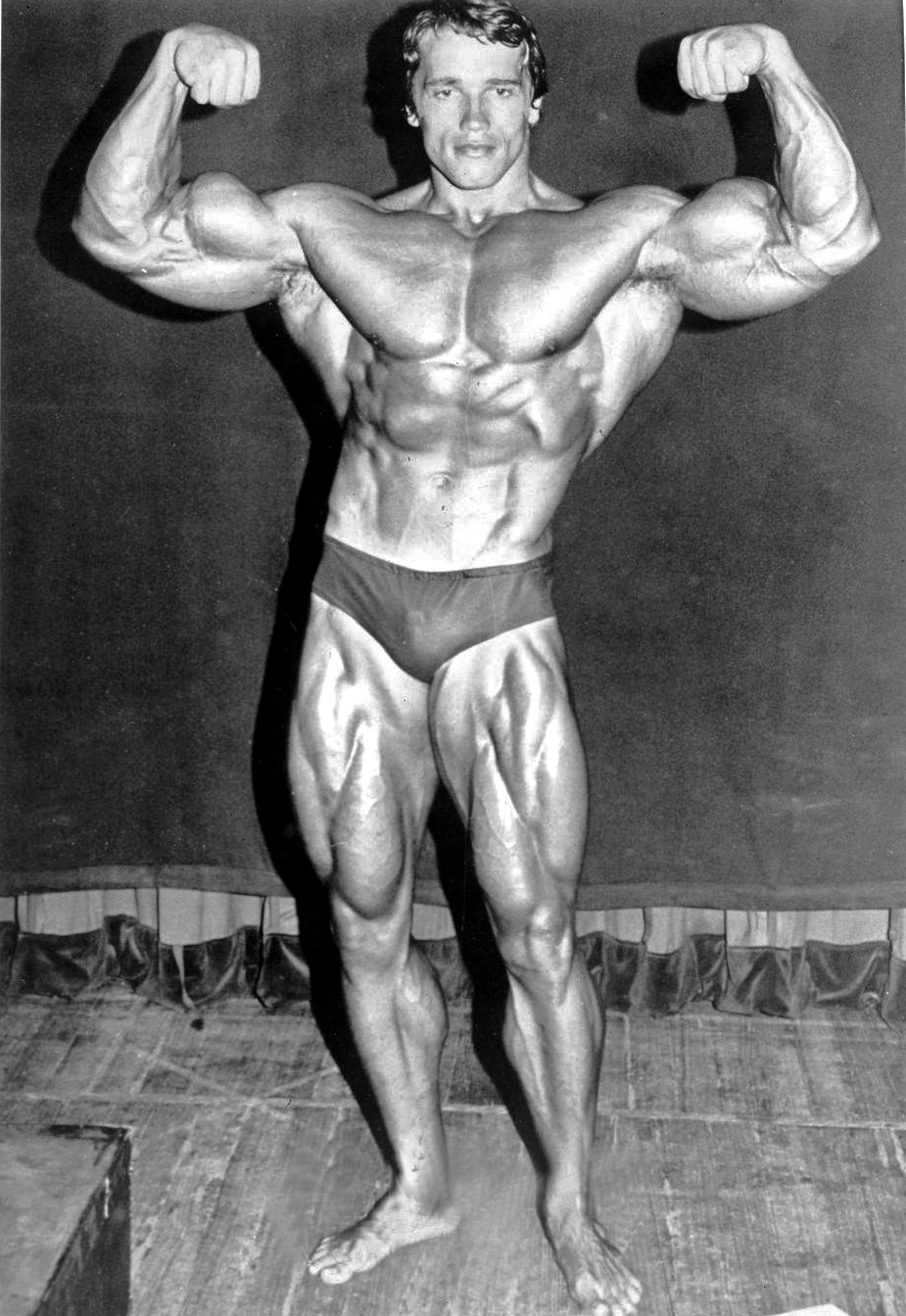
Arnold Schwarzenegger, one of the most notable figures in bodybuilding, 1974

Over time, wealthy and powerful figures moved away from the idealistic nature and grew to see wealth through access to scarcities as more ideal. One of these scarcities was the amount of food accessible at the time. When food shortages were a problem, excessive adipose tissue (body fat) was a symbol of wealth. Paintings that represented the beauty of the early modern period were of prominent and powerful figures, many showing their wealth through their excess adipose tissue. Due to this, they were not painted in an idealistic way, focusing especially on the clothes and other material possessions to accentuate this wealth.

In the modern day, the opposite is true. Men are now praised for and expected to present themselves with an extremely low body fat percentage and big muscles. In fact, there is a community of men dedicated to acquiring the ideal male physique called gym bros. Men often go through extreme diets, dietary supplements, or performance-enhancing drugs to achieve the ideal male physique. There is an increase in eating disorders and body dysmorphia among young men as a result of these current standards.

== Cosmetic procedures ==
In the 1950s, cosmetic surgery was first developed. While it was not as common for men to go undergo cosmetic surgery during that time, the development of cosmetic surgery reinforced already existing beauty standards for men.

The current rise of the looksmaxxing community and social media has caused men to be more heavily scrutinized for their appearance. As a result, men are beginning to pay more attention to their looks, and there has been a rise in cosmetic procedures done on men. Dan Saleh, a leading plastic surgeon at The Face Institute at the Beverly Hospital and Clinic, claims to have seen a significant increase in male consultations for plastic surgery post-COVID.In addition, according to the American Society of Plastic Surgeons, the amount of men undergoing cosmetic procedures to enhance their visuals and fit into beauty standards has increased since 2018. More men are increasingly getting procedures such as face lifts and botox. In some regions, such as East Asia, men get double eyelid surgery, rhinoplasties, and double jaw surgery done to fit the masculine beauty ideal of their culture.

Cosmetic procedures refer not only to plastic surgery but also procedures that do not require surgical invasion. For example, more men are investing in skincare, makeup, eyebrow tinting, and many more procedures that improve their looks and help them better fit the beauty standards for men.

== Technology ==
With the development of social media, people are able to better connect across regions and cultures to unite on a universal masculine beauty ideal. Social media has caused men to become more conscious of their looks and whether or not they fit into the masculine beauty ideal. With certain subcultures on social media such as gym bros and the looksmaxxing community, masculine beauty ideals are more heavily enforced through the development of technology.

The rise in AI also sparked an increase in the strictness of masculine beauty ideals. With new AI-based tools that rank and rate men according to the ideal male face, such as the PSL Scale, men have easier access to tools that tell them how to better fit into the masculine beauty ideals.

== Impacts ==
Masculine beauty ideals and the standards society hold for men have many impacts on both the mental and physical health of young men. The strict ideals for the way men should look can lead young men to feel insecure, leading to depression or body image issues such as eating disorders or body dysmorphia. In addition, the pressure to look a certain way can cause men to go through processes to change their appearance and fit in with these standards at the risk of their physical health. For example, the gym bro community often deteriorates their own health through performance-enhancing drugs to fit into the ideal body standards for men. Similarly, in parts of the world where androgynous beauty is the standard, men often go through extreme starvation diets in order to fit into masculine beauty ideals. In addition, the rise of the looksmaxxing community has led to men engaging in harmful behavior such as bone smashing and unprofessionally injecting themselves with peptides to achieve the desired male look. These impacts show the effect masculine beauty ideals can have on the health of young men around the world.

== See also ==
- Beefcake
- Bodybuilding
- Himbo
- Physical fitness
- Skeletal muscle
- Feminine beauty ideal
- Sexual dimorphism
- Tall, dark and handsome
- Looksmaxxing
