= Human trafficking in Colombia =

Colombia has a high prevalence of women and girls who are subjected to human trafficking, specifically forced prostitution. These women and girls work within Colombia, and are also sent to sex tourism destinations in other parts of Latin America, the Caribbean, Europe, Asia, and North America, including the United States. The humanitarian crisis in Venezuela has worsened from 2010 to the present, with almost 1.5 million people fleeing from Venezuela to cities throughout Colombia in recent years. Immigrants in major Colombian cities such as Bogotá, Medellín, and Cali find work scarce, and some turn to prostitution as a last resort to feed their families. Within Colombia, some men are found in conditions of forced labor, but the forced prostitution of women and children from rural areas and urban areas remains a larger problem. Individual cases of forced marriage – a risk factor for trafficking – involuntary domestic servitude, and forced begging have been reported. Some children are subjected to forced labor in mines and quarries, in the agricultural sector or as domestic servants. Groups at high risk for internal trafficking include displaced persons, poor women in rural areas, and relatives of members of criminal organizations. Continued armed violence in Colombia has displaced many in rural communities, making them vulnerable to human trafficking. Guerillas and new illegal armed groups have been reported to forcibly recruit children to join their ranks; the government estimates thousands of children are exploited under such conditions. Members of gangs and organized criminal networks may force their relatives and acquaintances, and displaced persons – typically women and children – into conditions of forced prostitution and forced labor, including forced work in the illegal drug trade. Colombia is also a destination for foreign child sex tourists, particularly in coastal cities such as Cartagena and Barranquilla. Migrants from South America, Africa, and China transit Colombia en route to the United States and Europe; some may fall victim to traffickers.

In December 2009 Ecuadorian government investigations revealed that the drug trafficking Revolutionary Armed Forces of Colombia (FARC) had an extensive network in Ecuador and might have possibly allowed guerrillas to fund President Rafael Correa’s 2006 election campaign. The US and EU have labeled the FARC as a terrorist organization. With the penetration of the FARC into Ecuador’s government and judiciary system, the country has turned into a region of transnational crime organizations penetrating its borders. When the visa restrictions for nationals from most countries were lifted in Ecuador in 2008, and with the implementation in 2000 to the US dollar as currency, the borders were opened up to more money laundering and human trafficking organizations from Russia, China, India and Africa. US diplomats state that almost every non-Latin American immigrant that was captured had transitioned through Ecuador. Since the investigations in December, concerns for Ecuador have been on the rise and the Financial Action Task Force (FATF) was to take action in February 2010 in a meeting in Abu-Dhabi. Colombia has always been known for its drug smuggling into the US, and has now become a major hub for smuggling people from Africa and Asia into the US through Mexico; causing major security problems and possibly bringing in terrorists.

Felipe Muñoz of Colombia’s domestic intelligence and immigration agency (DAS) reported that in 2009 more than 480 illegal immigrants were captured. Colombian officials arrested Ethiopian national Yohannes Elfneh Neguissie in connection with human trafficking. He was living in Colombia as a refugee and was receiving money from South Africa and the US in order to send immigrants via boat, or cheap flights to Mexico. He is said to have moved over 1,000 people through Colombia in 2009 alone.

The Government of Colombia fully complies with the minimum standards for the elimination of trafficking in persons. During the reporting period, the government increased law enforcement actions against trafficking offenders, enhanced prevention efforts, and continued to offer victim services through an interagency trafficking operations center and through partnerships with NGO's and international organizations. The significant number of Colombians trafficked abroad, however, reflects the need for increased prevention efforts and victim services.

In February 2009, Colombia’s President Uribe stigmatized the general work of human rights defenders, accusing them to be working with the guerrilla. Through his statements, he showed direct disrespect for legitimate human rights organizations. On 2 March 2009, the Uribe Government accused the US Committee on Labour and Education of being driven by political hatred. A national and international campaign began in September 2009, hoping to change the Government’s views on human rights defender. Over 270 human rights organizations have come together for the "Colombia: Human Rights Defenders Under Threat" campaign.

The U.S. State Department's Office to Monitor and Combat Trafficking in Persons placed the country in "Tier 1" in 2017 and in 2023.

Colombia ratified the 2000 UN TIP Protocol in August 2004.

In 2023, the Organised Crime Index gave Colombia a score of 8 out of 10 for human trafficking.

== Prosecution (2009) ==
The Government of Colombia increased its human trafficking law enforcement efforts during the reporting period. Colombia prohibits all forms of trafficking through its trafficking statute, Law 985, which prescribes harsh punishments. Such punishments are sufficiently stringent and commensurate with other serious crimes, such as rape. In 2009, Colombian authorities initiated 215 anti-trafficking investigations, reported 200 trafficking prosecutions, and achieved 14 convictions, sentencing trafficking offenders to periods of imprisonment ranging from 7 to 27 years. Such results compare to 159 investigations and 16 convictions reported for 2008. Investigations of labor trafficking increased dramatically in 2009, with 80 reports of potential forced labor offenses compared to two in 2008. The government maintained partnerships with foreign governments to repatriate trafficking victims and investigate trafficking cases in Argentina, Bolivia, Ecuador, El Salvador, Guatemala, Mexico, Nicaragua, Panama, Trinidad and Tobago, and the United States. There were no corroborated reports of trafficking-related corruption during 2009 and the government did not convict any officials for trafficking-related offenses. Public prosecutors received training on trafficking issues from an international organization.

== Protection (2009) ==
The government maintained victim protection efforts, both through direct provision of assistance and in partnership with NGOs and international organizations. The government did not appear to employ formal procedures for identifying trafficking victims among vulnerable populations within the country, such as displaced persons or women in prostitution. Authorities ran an interagency anti-trafficking operations center to refer victims to providers of protective services, as well as to coordinate and track criminal investigation and prosecution of their cases, and collect nationwide information and statistics about trafficking crimes. The government did not operate shelters dedicated to trafficking victims, but referred victims to local NGOs to provide these services. Authorities provided medical and psychological care, access to financial and employment assistance, and information and legal support for judicial processes. The government identified 155 victims of transnational trafficking during 2009, who consisted of near equal numbers of forced labor and sex trafficking victims, in addition to 14 victims who were trafficked within Colombia. The majority of these victims were adults, and the center provided 78 of these victims with services in collaboration with an NGO. Many victims only requested assistance in returning to their homes, and the government provided safe passage for victims returning home. The government encouraged victims to assist in trafficking investigations and prosecutions, and provided housing to victims participating in these efforts through its witness protection program. However, most victims were reluctant to testify against their traffickers due to fear of reprisals or lack of awareness of their status as victims of a serious crime; four victims participated in prosecutions during 2009. Consular officials assisted 110 Colombians trafficked overseas during 2009: this represented a significant increase in repatriation assistance when compared with the 22 trafficking victims assisted by Colombian consular officers abroad in 2008. The government contracted legal advisors and social workers to help support Colombians abroad. However, victim services overseas are limited to consular districts with at least 10,000 Colombian residents, and are not likely to be available to victims trafficked to isolated locations. At home, Colombian law enforcement authorities encourage victims to assist with the investigation and prosecution of their traffickers. There were no reports of victims being jailed or otherwise penalized for unlawful acts committed as a direct result of being trafficked. While there was no specialized legal mechanism in 2009 whereby the government offered a visa or temporary residence status to foreign trafficking victims, the government could provide trafficking victims with temporary permission to remain in the country on a case-by-case basis; these victims were eligible to receive humanitarian assistance from the government.

== Prevention (2009) ==
The government continued substantial prevention efforts against human trafficking. In partnership with international organizations, the government launched a new national trafficking prevention campaign targeting young, low-income Colombians, and concluded a campaign from the previous year; both campaigns included TV commercials, radio spots, and print ads. In collaboration with an international organization, the government also launched a pilot program to combat sex trafficking in two high-risk neighborhoods through public awareness events and training sessions for community leaders. Authorities trained 171 journalists in Medellin, Cartagena, and Cali to improve awareness and increase accurate media coverage of trafficking in persons issues. The Ministry of Education introduced a trafficking in persons component into its sexual education curriculum. Through its anti-trafficking operations center, the government operated a national call center, which received 7,801 calls during 2009. Most calls were citizen requests for information relating to job offers overseas, though 133 suspected trafficking cases from the call center were referred to police for investigation. The government encouraged more active anti-trafficking efforts at the local level, and two departments implemented anti-trafficking work plans during 2009, for a total of 15 departments with such plans. In 2009, the government hosted a national workshop for these departmental committees to share challenges and best practices. Colombian authorities hosted visiting delegations from Trinidad and Tobago, Chile, and Panama, and shared best practices from the anti-trafficking center with these delegations. Article 219 of the Colombian criminal code prohibits organizing or facilitating sexual tourism and provides penalties of 3 to 8 years’ imprisonment, but there were no reported prosecutions or convictions of child sex tourists. No other government campaigns to reduce demand for commercial sex acts were visible during 2009, but the government reduced demand for child labor through public awareness and training efforts, often in partnership with international organizations.

== Human Trafficking in Colombia 2024 ==
In 2024, the Procuraduría General de la Nación (Attorney General's Office) of Colombia reported a concerning rise in human trafficking cases, particularly among minors. Between 2020 and 2023, 709 cases were documented, with a 400% increase in victims aged 12 to 17 between 2022 and 2023. Regions such as La Guajira, the Darién Gap, and border areas have been identified as critical hotspots for this issue. Factors like poverty, irregular migration, and social conflict are exploited by traffickers to recruit victims. The Attorney General emphasized the need for coordinated efforts between the government, civil society, and the international community to combat this human rights violation.

== See also ==
- Human rights in Colombia
