= We Only Talk About Real Shit When We're Fucked Up =

Studio album by Bas
- Released: December 15, 2023
- Length: 51:48
- Label: Dreamville; Interscope
- Producer: 48th St; AzizTheShake; Boi-1da; Canei Finch; Cedric Brown; Charlie Miles; Christo; Coleman; CuBeatz; Deputy; DZL; FKJ; Gage Brown; Galimatias; Groove; Herc Cut The Lights; Hether; J. Lloyd; Joe Harrison; Kel-P; KQuick; Kujibeats; Kurzweil; Linden Jay; Luca Mauti; Lydia Kitto; mOma+Guy; Park Ave.; Ron Gilmore; Sensei Bueno; Steve Bilodeau; Swam; Tee-WaTT; T-Minus

Bas chronology
[BUMP] Pick Me Up (2022)	We Only Talk About Real Shit When We're Fucked Up (2023)

Singles from We Only Talk About Real Shit When We're Fucked Up
- 1. "Diamonds" Released: January 24, 2023; 2. "Passport Bros" Released: July 19, 2023; 3. "Ho Chi Minh" Released: August 19, 2023; 4. "Khartoum" Released: October 24, 2023; 5. "179 Deli" Released: November 28, 2023

We Only Talk About Real Shit When We're Fucked Up is the fourth studio album by American rapper Bas. It was released on December 15, 2023, by Dreamville Records and Interscope Records. The album features guest appearances from Adekunle Gold, AJ Tracey, Amaarae, ASAP Ferg, Blxckie, FKJ, J. Cole and Sha Sha, with production handled by a variety of producers, including J. Cole, FKJ, Boi-1da, CuBeatz, Galimatias and Kel-P, among others.

The album was supported by five official singles: "Diamonds", "Passport Bros" with J. Cole, "Ho Chi Minh", "Khartoum" with Adekunle Gold, and "179 Deli" with AJ Tracey.

== Release and promotion ==
Bas first announced the album on January 31, 2023, following the release of the album's lead single "Diamonds", via Twitter, posting a promotional cover art with the caption, "4th album". Bas continued to tease the album throughout 2023 until officially announcing it further after the release of "Passport Bros".

The album was officially announced on December 5, 2023, after Bas had taken to his Instagram to post the official tracklist and release date. The tracklist previewed features from Adekunle Gold, AJ Tracey, Amaarae, ASAP Ferg, Blxckie, FKJ, J. Cole and Sha Sha.

Bas announced the "We Only Talk About Real Shit When We’re Fucked Up Tour" in support the album in January 2024, set to run from March 2024 to July 2024. In April 2024, he announced that the European leg of the tour had been postponed in order to tend to his ailing mother.

=== Singles ===
The album's lead single, "Diamonds" was released on January 24, 2023, with an accompanying music video. The album's second single "Passport Bros" with J. Cole was released six months later on July 19, 2023, with its official music video being released just hours after. The album's third single "Ho Chi Minh" was released on August 19, 2023, alongside the official music video. The title of the song plays homage to Ho Chi Minh, a former president of North Vietnam. The album's fourth single, "Khartoum" with Adekunle Gold was released on October 24, 2023. The music video was also filmed in Khartoum, the capital of Sudan. The album's fifth and final single, "179 Deli" with UK rapper AJ Tracey was released on November 28, 2023.

== Critical reception ==
Professional ratings
Review scores
Source	Rating
HipHopDX	3.1/5
Pitchfork	6.3/10

Pitchfork's Dylan Green felt that the album has "more R&B melodies and heartfelt vulnerability than ever" and wrote that Bas "sounds most comfortable and self-assured when rapping next to Cole", but concluded that "as a solo artist, he winds up doing the one thing he feared most: spreading himself too thin". Alec Siegel of HipHopDX wrote that "aside from flashes of retrospection and insight, the album rarely delves too deep into the 'real shit.'"

== Track listing ==
We Only Talk About Real Shit When We're Fucked Up track listing
No.	Title	Writer(s)	Producer(s)	Length
1.	"Light of My Soul"	Abbas Hamad; Scotty Coleman; Matthew Samuels; Linden Jay; Lydia Kitto; Brian Holland; Eddie Holland; Lamont Dozier; Egbal Nasr	Coleman; Boi-1da; Linden Jay; Lydia Kitto	3:37
2.	"Black Jedi"	Hamad; Michael Holmes; Benjamin Tolbert; Gabriel Rene	DZL; Groove	3:26
3.	"Choppas"	Hamad; Canei Finch; John Welch III; Holmes; Vincent Fenton; B. Holland; E. Holland; Dozier	Canei Finch; Christo; DZL; FKJ	3:18
4.	"Home Alone" (with J. Cole)	Hamad; Jermaine Lamarr Cole; Kevin Gomringer; Tim Gomringer; Tyler Williams	CuBeatz; Steve Bilodeau; T-Minus	3:30
5.	"Risk" (with FKJ)	Hamad; Fenton	FKJ	4:00
6.	"Decent" (with Amaarae)	Hamad; Ama Genfi; Holmes; Fenton; Jay Kurzweil; Ronald Gilmore	DZL; FKJ; Kurzweil; Ron Gilmore	2:57
7.	"Ho Chi Minh"	Hamad; Udoma Amba	Kel-P	2:04
8.	"179 Deli" (with AJ Tracey)	Hamad; Ché Grant; Jamil Pierre; Gage Brown; Josh Lloyd-Watson; Kitto	Deputy; Gage Brown; J. Lloyd; Lydia Kitto	3:02
9.	"Passport Bros" (with J. Cole)	Hamad; Cole; Abdul Dieng; Holmes; Luke Mauti	AzizTheShake; DZL; Luca Mauti	2:45
10.	"Testify" (with Sha Sha)	Hamad; Charmaine Mapimbiro; Charlie Miles; Isaiah Zuza; Mohamed Hamad; Amanpreet Sahota	Charlie Miles; Herc Cut The Lights; mOma+Guy	2:34
11.	"U-Turn" (with ASAP Ferg and Blxckie)	Hamad; Darold Ferguson Jr.; Sihle Sithole; M. Hamad; Sahota	mOma+Guy	3:15
12.	"Paper Cuts" (with J. Cole)	Hamad; Cole; Zachary Webster; Voshon Vernon; Terry Watson; Kitto; Jane Duboc Vaquer; Gay Vaquer	48th St; Park Ave.; Tee-WaTT	3:53
13.	"Diamonds"	Hamad; Paul Castelluzzo; Joe Harrison; Linden Berelowitz; Kitto	Hether; Joe Harrison; Linden Jay	3:31
14.	"Yao Ming"	Hamad; Harrison; Berelowitz; Kitto	Joe Harrison; Linden Jay; Lydia Kitto	2:37
15.	"Dr. O'blivion"	Hamad; Cole; Matias Køedt	J. Cole; Galimatias	2:10
16.	"Khartoum" (with Adekunle Gold)	Hamad; Adekunle Kosoko; Cedric Brown; Amba; Kaleb Rollins; Ofer Ishai; Jarrett Goodly; Roman Mironchenko	Cedric Brown; Kel-P; KQuick; Kujibeats; Sensei Bueno; Swam	2:23
17.	"Wait on Me" (with FKJ)	Hamad; Fenton	FKJ	2:46
Total length:				51:48
