= Prostitution in Colombia =

Prostitution in Colombia is legal, regulated and limited to brothels in designated "tolerance zones". Sex workers are required to have regular health checks. However, the laws are rarely applied and prostitution is widespread, partly due to poverty and internal displacement.

Domestically, organized crime networks, some related to illegal armed groups, are responsible for human trafficking for sexual slavery and the armed conflict has made a large number of internal trafficking victims vulnerable.

UNAIDS estimate there to be 7,218 prostitutes in the country.

== Illegal prostitution ==
=== Child prostitution ===
A series of factors put children at risk for sexual exploitation in Colombia and leave them unprotected. The war and the drug trade have altered family structures that in ordinary times would have provided safety and nurture. The war has also caused the displacement of countless families, some of whose children have been soldiers in the war. Displaced children are particularly vulnerable to being forced into prostitution, even more so in the declining economy.

A spokesman for the UN's children's fund, UNICEF, Karel de Rooy, said many child prostitutes were as young as nine years old and that clients were often middle-aged foreigners. He also said that the children were often addicted to drugs.

Commercial sexual exploitation of children is found especially in urban centers and in areas where there are large numbers of men who are separated from families due to work. Children are involved in commercial sexual exploitation either on the streets or in private establishments such as bars, brothels, or massage parlors.

The culture of violence in Colombia had created a feeling of fear and resignation among the population; the violence had led to child prostitution and child gangs which added to the worsening situation of violence.

Colombia also is a destination for foreign child sex tourists, particularly coastal cities such as Cartagena and Barranquilla.

=== Sex trafficking ===
Colombia is a major source country for women and girls trafficked to Latin America, the Caribbean, Western Europe, Asia, and North America, including the United States, for purposes of commercial sexual exploitation. Internally, women and children are trafficked from rural to urban areas for commercial sexual exploitation.

Continued armed violence in Colombia has displaced many communities, making them vulnerable to human trafficking. Groups at high risk for internal trafficking include displaced persons, poor women in rural areas, and relatives of members of criminal organizations.

Members of gangs and organized criminal networks force their relatives and acquaintances, and displaced persons–typically women and children–into conditions of forced prostitution.

Many traffickers disclose the sexual nature of the work they offer but conceal information about working conditions, clientele, freedom of movement, and compensation. Others disguise their intent by portraying themselves as modeling agents, offering marriage brokerage services, providing study programs, or operating lottery or bingo scams with free trips as prizes.

The United States Department of State Office to Monitor and Combat Trafficking in Persons ranks Colombia as a 'Tier 1' country.

=== Government response ===
The Government of Colombia is making efforts to fight child prostitution, forced prostitution, sexual slavery and human trafficking.

Colombia prohibits all forms of trafficking through its anti-trafficking statute, Law 985, which prescribes minimum punishments of 13 to 23 years’ imprisonment.

The Government of Colombia cooperates with foreign governments to repatriate trafficking victims and investigate trafficking cases.

The Government has improved prevention efforts against human trafficking by launching a widespread education campaign entitled “The Next Victim Could Be You” in October 2008. The campaign included TV commercials, radio spots, and print advertising featuring a popular Colombian television personality.

However, the poverty and violence from the country create an environment where sexual exploitation thrives. Many victims of trafficking refuse to assist in the prosecution of their traffickers due to fear of reprisals.
