= Kevin Samuels =

American internet personality (1965–2022)

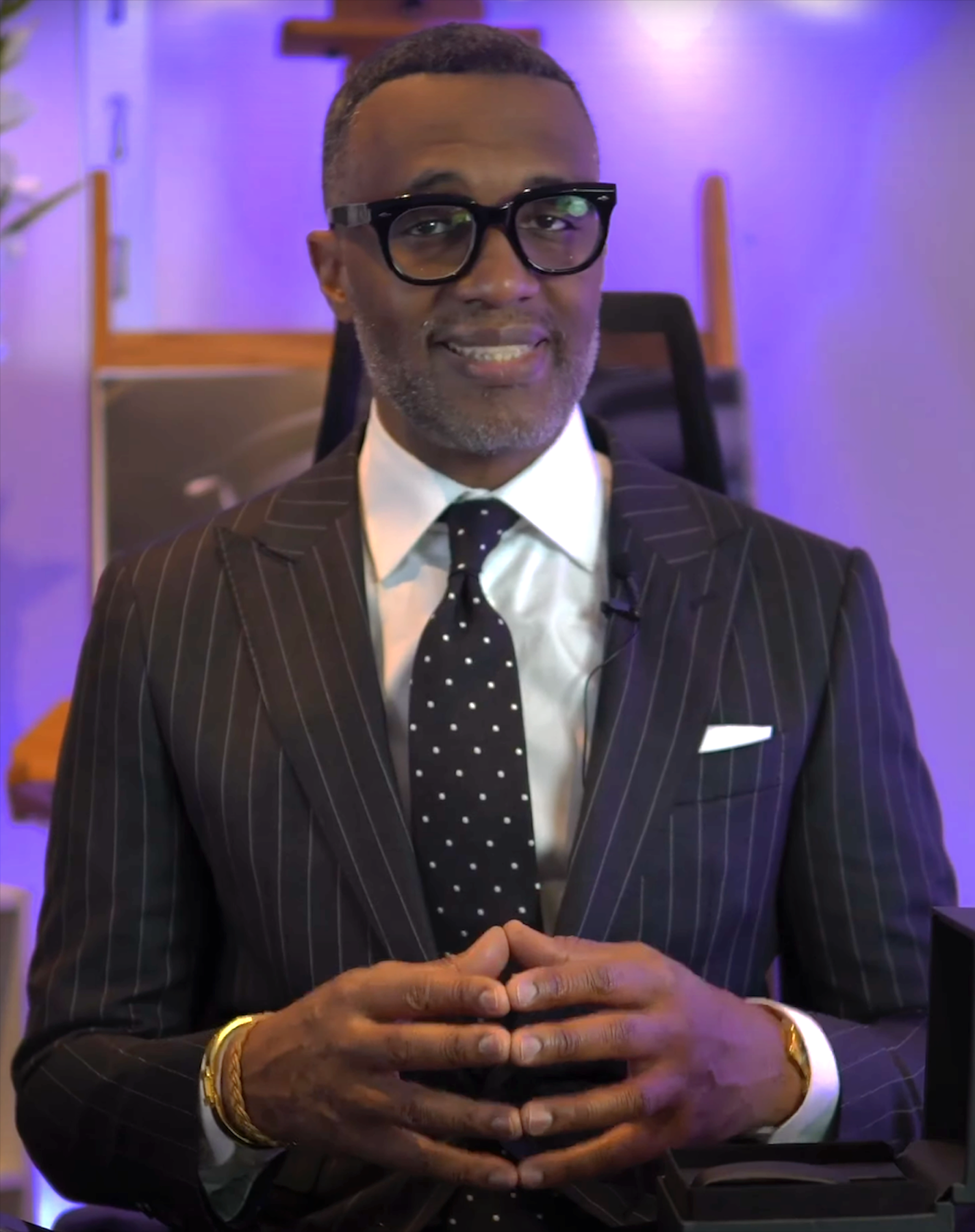
- Samuels in 2020
- Born: Kevin Roshon Samuels; March 13, 1969; Oklahoma City, Oklahoma, U.S.
- Died: May 5, 2022 (aged 53); Atlanta, Georgia, U.S.
- Occupations: Internet personality; image consultant
- Movement: Black Manosphere; Manosphere
- Children: 1

Kevin Roshon Samuels (March 13, 1969 – May 5, 2022) was an American internet personality and image consultant. He rose to popularity in 2020 through his YouTube and Instagram live streams discussing modern society, gender issues, and relationships.

== Early life ==
Kevin Samuels was born in Oklahoma City. He attended Millwood High School and studied chemical engineering at the University of Oklahoma, but was not able to graduate due to having Hodgkin lymphoma at age 21. He said it was a point in life where he "recognized [his] own mortality". He was a member of Kappa Alpha Psi.

== Career ==
Samuels worked in the marketing industry before allegedly starting his own image-consulting firm in 2013. He accumulated 1.4 million subscribers on YouTube, 1.2 million followers on Instagram and thousands on several other online platforms like Twitter and TikTok. The New York Times described him as projecting "hypermasculine authority" and as an advocate for "strict gender roles".

Samuels gained traction in mainstream hip-hop culture, interviewing Nicki Minaj and T.I., while also making guest appearances on No Jumper, Joe Budden TV and VladTV. In 2022, Samuels made a cameo appearance on the television series Atlanta in the episode "Rich Wigga, Poor Wigga". In February 2022, Samuels appeared in a music video in which he acted as a therapist and dating coach for rapper Future on the single "Worst Day". He also interviewed popular Instagram models like Brittany Renner, and reality TV stars like Tommie Lee. Several prominent guests such as Minaj, Marlon Wayans, and Tamar Braxton showed support for his work.

Samuels engaged in commentary on dating prospects for men and women, with a focus on the African American community. He frequently spoke about what he considered to be "high-value men," emphasizing financial success, social status, and discipline, while also discussing the traits he believed made a woman "high-value" in the dating market. He encouraged women to embrace femininity, be more cooperative in relationships, lose weight, lean into submissive values, and prioritize finding a long-term relationship or marriage in their youth. He encouraged men to focus on building their careers, dressing well, and improving themselves physically and mentally to increase their value in the dating and business world.

Samuels often criticized what he saw as unrealistic expectations people had for partners, especially regarding financial stability, physical appearance, and traditional gender roles. He believed that some women had unrealistically high standards for the types of men they should be dating, and criticized men for lacking employable skills and ambition. Samuels strongly criticized the black community over its high out-of-wedlock birth rate and significantly lower marriage rate compared to other racial groups in the United States.

His supporters defended him as a truth-teller who provided tough love, particularly to black men and women, and as an advocate of traditional values, believing he inspired individuals to strive for higher standards in their personal and professional lives. Critics argued that his delivery was often harsh, demeaning, or reinforcing outdated gender roles and stereotypes .

== Personal life and death ==
Samuels was married and divorced twice. He had one daughter in his first marriage.

On May 5, 2022, Samuels was found unresponsive in his Atlanta apartment after a woman who had stayed with him the night prior called 911, telling the operator Samuels was complaining of chest pains and that he had collapsed. Samuels was rushed to a hospital, where he later died. According to the medical examiner's report, Samuels had hypertension, which contributed to his death.
