= Allyn & Bacon =

American academic publisher

- Parent company: Pearson Education
- Founded: 1868
- Country of origin: United States
- Headquarters location: Boston, Massachusetts
- Publication types: Textbooks
- Official website: www.pearsonhighered.com www.allynbaconmerrill.com

Allyn & Bacon, founded in 1868, is a higher education textbook publisher in the areas of education, humanities and social sciences. It is an imprint of Pearson Education, the world's largest education publishing and technology company, which is part of Pearson PLC.

Allyn & Bacon was an independent company until it was purchased by Esquire, Inc., the former publishers of the magazine of the same name, in 1981. Esquire, Inc. was sold to Gulf+Western in 1983, and Allyn & Bacon became part of Simon & Schuster's education division. Pearson purchased the education and reference divisions of Simon & Schuster in 1998.

In 2007, Allyn & Bacon merged with Merrill, also a Pearson company. As a result of the merge, the company's website changed from ablongman.com to pearsonhighered.com. The name still persists in a few titles like The Allyn & Bacon Guide to Writing by Ramage, Bean & Johnson, the 8th edition of which was released in 2018.
