= Entitlement (psychology) =

Sense of being owed something without cause

In psychology, entitlement is defined as a sense of deservingness or being owed a favor when little or nothing has been done to deserve special treatment; the belief that one is inherently deserving of privileges or special treatment (the phrase "sense of entitlement" is often used). Entitlement can be seen through the actions of the individual, such as having a belief that they deserve the rewards which are due to their position, despite not performing effectively. Other factors can contribute to the formation of an entitlement mindset, especially when the individual is a child, such as helicopter parenting, and rewarding undeserving behaviors. The idea of entitlement is especially prevalent in the discussions of younger people who are accepted as students by collegiate institutions. A sense of entitlement can lead individuals to reinforce their beliefs if their image is damaged by external notions. While some people may genuinely be entitled to preferential treatment in some situations, this article is mainly about an unjustified sense of entitlement.

== Psychology ==
An inflated sense of what is sometimes called psychological entitlement – unrealistic, exaggerated, or rigidly held – is especially prominent among narcissists. According to the DSM-5, individuals with narcissistic personality disorder (NPD) are likely to have a "sense of entitlement to special treatment and to obedience from others," typically without commensurate qualities or accomplishments: Similarly, the narcissistic personality attempts to protect the vulnerable self by building layers of grandiosity and a huge sense of entitlement. When the subject's entitlement is threatened, they engage in harmful behaviors and will lean on to their image or esteem conjured by the individuals around them. Narcissists may also engage in entitled behavior by increasing their social standing through select interactions. Similar to individuals with narcissistic personality disorder, those with borderline personality disorder (BPD) display a strong sense of entitlement, according to research conducted by Dr. John Gunderson and Dr. Elsa Ronningstam. Ronningstam and Gunderson state, "Characteristics shared by the two disorders and thus failing to discriminate between NPD and BPD are notable. A sense of entitlement occurred in both diagnostic groups in Morey's and our studies; that is, both narcissists and borderlines felt that others should recognize their needs and give them special favours."

An earned sense of entitlement is usually more beneficial than a purely-psychological entitlement. Still, the former may also have a destructive counterpart in the sense of a felt entitlement to revenge based on the accumulation of grievances.

According to a study, narcissism is not associated with autonomy and adversely correlated with sociotropy, demonstrating low degrees of dependency without being excessively dependent. In contrast, entitlement showed a mixed pattern of dependency on others and a desire for independence from them, positively predicting both sociotropy and autonomy. Thus, despite having a self-centric attitude in common, psychological entitlement and narcissism have different orientations toward other people.

Psychoanalysis differentiated among children three main varieties of the sense of entitlement: normal, inflated, and compromised. The inflated sense of entitlement sought special privileges for the individual alone, perhaps to compensate for childhood suffering or narcissistic injury. The compromised sense involved an inability to expect the basic rights enjoyed by those around one. A normal or healthy sense of entitlement included an expectation of responsiveness from significant others, a sense of agency, and a sense of one's right to one's feelings, all of which form positive elements in self-esteem.

Ivan Boszormenyi-Nagy distinguished in adult life between (ethically) earning entitlement in relationships, which comes from care and consideration, and a subjective feeling of entitlement, the real basis for which may be very different. Thus, the depressive may have an unjustifiably-low sense of entitlement, and the manic may have an exaggeratedly high one. The gambler may feel entitled to expect a big win to compensate for childhood deprivation. Those who clamor most loudly for such reimbursement from fate may, in fact, unconsciously doubt their entitlement to anything at all.

== Manifestation in individuals ==
Entitlement is commonly found in individuals with narcissistic personality disorder, possibly from how the entitled individual was raised as a child. Entitlement and narcissism can lead to the feeling of unsatisfying relationships, both romantic and platonic, through the idea that they are not receiving the deserved treatment. Those who are entitled can experience lower rates of satisfaction within their personal lives, especially when their narcissistic behaviors are discovered.

Entitlement changes depending on the context within which the entitled individual acts. Entitlement can be viewed differently with gender, as societal norms dictate the level of entitlement experienced by either sex. For example, male academics and college students report more academic entitlement than women. Other contextual incidents can be within the workplace. Whenever a worker feels that they are accused of entitlement by their employer, this can lead to a negative affects within both parties, but could lead to positive effects as well depending on the severity of the accusation. Those with entitlement may view themselves as acting within boundaries according to their own contexts.

== See also ==
- Narcissism
- Non-possession § Sense of entitlement
