= Nobody Beats the Biebs =

- Atlanta episode
- Episode no.: Season 1 Episode 5
- Directed by: Hiro Murai
- Written by: Stephen Glover
- Cinematography by: Christian Sprenger
- Editing by: Kyle Reiter
- Production code: XAA01005
- Original air date: September 27, 2016
- Running time: 23 minutes

Guest appearances
- Jane Adams as Janice; Paloma Guzman as Valencia Joyner; Austin Crute as Justin Bieber; Lloyd as himself; Jaleel White as himself

Episode chronology
← Previous "The Streisand Effect"	Next → "Value"
- Atlanta season 1

"Nobody Beats the Biebs" is the fifth episode of the first season of the American comedy-drama television series Atlanta. The episode was written by story editor Stephen Glover, and directed by producer Hiro Murai. It was first broadcast on FX in the United States on September 27, 2016.

The series is set in Atlanta and follows Earnest "Earn" Marks, as he tries to redeem himself in the eyes of his ex-girlfriend Van, who is also the mother of his daughter Lottie; as well as his parents and his cousin Alfred, who raps under the stage name "Paper Boi"; and Darius, Alfred's eccentric right-hand man. In the episode, Alfred participates in a basketball charity event, where he is annoyed to see that Justin Bieber (depicted as African-American) is attending the event and receiving more media attention. Meanwhile, Earn crashes an agents meeting for possible connections while Darius gets into trouble at a shooting range for his choice of target.

According to Nielsen Media Research, the episode was seen by an estimated 0.860 million household viewers and gained a 0.4 ratings share among adults aged 18–49. The episode received very positive reviews from critics, who praised its social commentary. Many critics analyzed the episode's portrayal of Justin Bieber.

== Plot ==
Earn (Donald Glover) and Alfred (Brian Tyree Henry) attend a youth charity event, where Alfred is set to play basketball along with other celebrities. Alfred approaches reporter Valencia Joyner (Paloma Guzman) for an interview, but she is not interested in him, deeming him part of "gangster things", which seems to upset him.

Suddenly, Justin Bieber arrives, and his presence annoys Alfred. He is more disgusted when Bieber only acknowledges him for the shooting incident and even gets an interview with Joyner, with Bieber making crude comments. He also sees Bieber urinating in a hallway just as the game is about to start, with the other celebrities not caring. As Earn leaves to find a seat, he is approached by a woman named Janice (Jane Adams), who mistakes him for a person named Alonzo. While he initially tries to explain the situation, he ends up going with her to an agents meeting in the stadium.

Meanwhile, Darius (Lakeith Stanfield) goes to a shooting range to try a gun. However, people are astounded to find that he used the silhouette of a dog as his shooting target. Two men tell Darius to drop the dog silhouette, but Darius remarks that they are angry for targeting dogs while they use human targets. Two men of apparently Middle Eastern ethnicity defend Darius and call out the apparently American-born customers for expressing their racism with their targets, although Darius wants to avoid trouble when the situation grows hostile. The store owner then forces Darius at gunpoint to leave the range, not even allowing him to take his dog target.

At the agents meeting, Earn gets many contacts for Alfred and enjoys the free service. Janice approaches him, talking about her previous encounter with "Alonzo". She then calls him out, as she believes Alonzo forced her out of the company and took her clients, intending to take revenge. As she leaves, Earn confesses that he is not Alonzo. Ignoring that, Janice says she will make sure that he "dies homeless". At the basketball game, Alfred and Bieber trade insults on the court. Later, Alfred hits Bieber during the game and both end up fighting. At a press conference, Bieber apologizes for his "cool" behavior and proceeds to sing a song from his upcoming album. Alfred is dismayed at the public gleefully staring at Bieber and approaches Joyner again for an interview. Joyner states that Alfred should "play his part" as the public wants him to be "the asshole" instead of Bieber due to his rapper status. Earn joins Alfred and they leave the conference.

== Production ==
=== Development ===
"Ayyye, okay! We got celebs in the building balling for the kids. I love me some Justin Bieber. Man, Paper Boi stay hating tho haha."

— Official description in the press release for the episode.

In August 2016, FX announced that the fifth episode of the season would be titled "Nobody Beats the Biebs" and that it would be written by story editor Stephen Glover and directed by producer Hiro Murai. This was Stephen Glover's third writing credit, and Murai's fifth directing credit.

== Portrayal of Justin Bieber ==
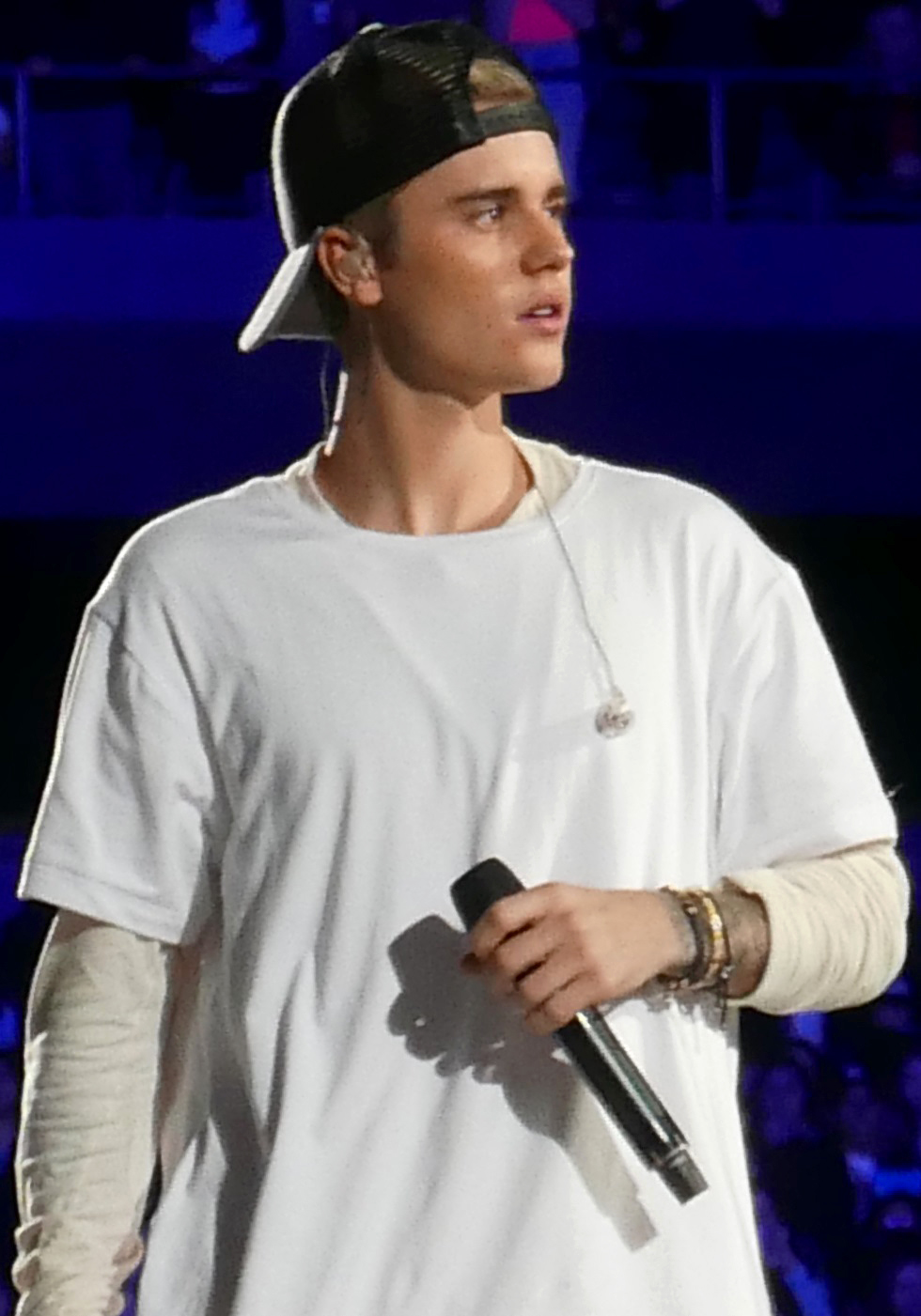
Justin Bieber (pictured in 2015) is portrayed in the episode as African-American.

The episode presented Justin Bieber as African-American, played by Austin Crute. Thrillist drew comparisons to the series Ray Donovan, which had an episode that raised the question of a "Black Justin Bieber". The Huffington Post viewed the episode as a form of exploring "real Bieber's famous appropriation of black culture as well as Hollywood's habit of whitewashing minority roles" as well as how "America can be so accepting of real-life Bieber's public fallouts and how that is likely a result of his white privilege."

The episode's writer, Stephen Glover, said that he and Donald Glover had the idea for quite some time and compared the episode to the film The Counselor, explaining "it's a really good-looking movie, weird, surreal, and there are things that happen in it that just make you want to watch it. I feel like this episode is kind of like that." He also said that when the producers sent the script for revision with FX, they received an e-mail that read "Um, can we actually get Justin Bieber to do this?" but FX never interfered with the episode's direction.

Jesse David Fox from Vulture compared the episode to the Theatre of the Absurd, writing "in the years to come, people will talk about the best episode of Atlanta or the episode in which it made the jump to a new echelon and the answer will be the same: 'Black Justin Bieber.'" He further said, "Atlanta confronts the cultural perception that black identity is a monolith. Also, it shows us that seeing a black Justin Bieber is funny."

Joshua Alston from The A.V. Club writing, "Bieber's actions are viewed through his status as a white male, and putting a black actor into the role forces the audience to reevaluate Bieber's obnoxious behavior through the lens of someone who wouldn't be granted nearly as much latitude just because of the body he inhabits." Alan Sepinwall commented, "Imagine if the real Bieber behaved the way he always does, and got into the trouble he usually does, only he looked like the actor playing him here, rather than a slightly more androgynous Kate McKinnon? He would not be greeted with the same level of adoration, and his mistakes wouldn't get quite so many 'boys will be boys' excuses." Ashley Ray-Harris from Inverse said, "Since 2014, pop culture has attempted to make the point that Bieber is an 'honorary black person.' This ignores the fact that his whiteness helped him achieve the level of success he's attained, and it allows him to freely appropriate from black culture without being viewed as a gangster or jerk like Alfred."

The episode drew attention in 2021. The final scene of the episode showed Bieber performing a song from his new album, Justice. Many people saw similarities when real-life Bieber announced his new album, Justice, in 2021.

== Reception ==
=== Viewers ===
The episode was watched by 0.860 million viewers, earning a 0.4 in the 18–49 rating demographics on the Nielson ratings scale. This means that 0.4 percent of all households with televisions watched the episode. This was a 7% decrease from the previous episode, which was watched by 0.920 million viewers with a 0.5 in the 18–49 demographics.

=== Critical reviews ===
"Nobody Beats the Biebs" received very positive reviews from critics. Joshua Alston of The A.V. Club gave the episode a "B+" and wrote, "Despite my reservations, I can't help but be charmed by this show again and again. 'Biebs' is the type of episode I might resent in a theoretical third or fourth season of this show, but for now, it's all a part of Atlanta's subtle, smart appeal. The great thing about being the most interesting comedy on television is that you don't have to be the funniest or the most consistent."

Alan Sepinwall of HitFix wrote, "After separating the trio of main characters into two groups, and two subplots, the last few weeks, Atlanta goes for a trio of short stories – one basically a one-panel comic sketch – in the wryly clever 'Nobody Beats the Biebs.'" Michael Arceneaux of Vulture gave the episode a 4 star rating out of 5 and wrote, "Alfred wants people to know 'the real him', but it doesn’t matter to the outside world. He is a rapper, therefore, he is a particular type of black man. He can't be complicated. He can't have complex emotions. He can't contradict his role. The reporter has already made up her mind, as have so many others. Still, 'Nobody Beats the Biebs' is an unfair presentation of this argument."

Michael Snydel of Paste wrote, "This isn't an episode that offers up open-ended questions about the show's views on the media. It's an outsized parody that's treated with the same ironic nonchalance of any other episode." Grant Ridner of PopMatters gave the episode an 8 out of 10 rating and wrote, "'Biebs' smartly subverts its bottle episode trappings by establishing two distinct settings: the court where Alfred dukes it out with Bieber, and the posh VIP area where Earn finds himself after Janice mistakes him for 'Alonzo', a former coworker."
