= The Jacket (Atlanta) =

- Atlanta episode
- Episode no.: Season 1 Episode 10
- Directed by: Hiro Murai
- Written by: Stephen Glover
- Cinematography by: Christian Sprenger
- Editing by: Isaac Hagy
- Production code: XAA01010
- Original air date: November 1, 2016
- Running time: 27 minutes

Guest appearances
- Harold House Moore as Swiff; Qaasim Middleton as Senator K

Episode chronology
← Previous "Juneteenth"	Next → "Alligator Man"
- Atlanta season 1

"The Jacket" is the tenth episode and season finale of the first season of the American comedy-drama television series Atlanta. The episode was written by story editor Stephen Glover, and directed by producer Hiro Murai. It was first broadcast on FX in the United States on November 1, 2016.

The series is set in Atlanta and follows Earnest "Earn" Marks, as he tries to redeem himself in the eyes of his ex-girlfriend Van, who is also the mother of his daughter Lottie; as well as his parents and his cousin Alfred, who raps under the stage name "Paper Boi"; and Darius, Alfred's eccentric right-hand man. In the episode, Earn loses his jacket with important items after a night of partying, and sets out to find it.

According to Nielsen Media Research, the episode was seen by an estimated 0.786 million household viewers and gained a 0.4 ratings share among adults aged 18–49. The episode received critical acclaim, with critics praising the performances, writing, directing and "smaller scale" episode.

== Plot ==
Earn (Donald Glover) wakes up in a house after a party, where the owner wants him gone. Earn suddenly realizes that he lost his blue bomber jacket and the owner claims not to know anything. He decides to follow back on the events of the previous day to find the jacket, as it carries important items.

He goes to a strip club, where he checks with a stripper about his actions the previous night, where she says she was with a woman but apparently is not a stripper. He leaves the club, and checks some Snapchat stories, where he, Alfred (Brian Tyree Henry) and Darius (Lakeith Stanfield) were drinking at a bar and then left for the strip club on an Uber, with a woman accompanying them. Through the stories, he sees that he no longer wore the jacket at the strip club. He meets with Alfred and Darius on the couch, where he contacts the Uber driver. The driver confirms he has the jacket, but wants $50 to deliver it to him.

Earn convinces Alfred and Darius to drive him to the driver's house. However, while they wait in their car, Alfred feels something weird is going on. As they try to leave, their car is intercepted by police cars, who were surveilling the area. The police surround them, guns drawn, aggressively ordering the three out of the car. Through shouted questioning, we learn the Uber driver is a notorious drug and weapons dealer. The driver bursts from the house, attempting to escape on foot, wearing Earn's jacket. The police open fire, shooting the driver in the back, killing him and damaging the jacket. Earn asks the officers to check the pockets but the police find nothing in them, and order him to leave the scene.

After the events, Alfred pays Earn his fee and invites him to his house, but he instead goes to meet with Van (Zazie Beetz) and Lottie. He is then visited by his co-worker Swiff (Harold House Moore), who hands him keys, the important items in his jacket that he asked him to guard at the club. As Earn prepares to leave, he gives the money to Van, who offers him to stay to sleep but he declines. Earn leaves and arrives at a storage facility, where he uses the key to unlock a unit. The unit is revealed to be a makeshift place where he is sleeping. He stares at $200 that he kept for himself as he turns off the lights, preparing to sleep.

== Production ==
=== Development ===
"Yo last night was 10 crazy. I bout lost my mind, Quita lost her phone, and this fool Earn lost his jacket smh. Who cares tho (laugh-crying emoji)."

— Official description in the press release for the episode.

In October 2016, FX announced that the tenth episode of the season would be titled "The Jacket" and that it would be written by story editor Stephen Glover, and directed by producer Hiro Murai. This was Stephen Glover's fourth writing credit, and Murai's seventh directing credit.

== Reception ==
=== Viewers ===
The episode was watched by 0.786 million viewers, earning a 0.4 in the 18-49 rating demographics on the Nielson ratings scale. This means that 0.4 percent of all households with televisions watched the episode. This was a 20% increase from the previous episode, which was watched by 0.651 million viewers with a 0.3 in the 18-49 demographics.

With DVR factored, the episode was watched by 1.66 million viewers with a 1.0 in the 18-49 demographics.

=== Critical reviews ===
"The Jacket" received critical acclaim. Eric Goldman of IGN gave the episode a "great" 8.5 out of 10 and wrote in his verdict: "Atlanta ended its fascinating first season with a very amusing 'gotta find something important' hunt for Earn that included a lot of really strong comedic material – followed by some poignant moments that involved Earn getting some hints that he might be moving in the right direction, even as we saw just how much he's been struggling up until this point."

Joshua Alston of The A.V. Club gave the episode an "A−" and wrote, "'The Jacket' accomplished a lot, including a chilling take on police-involved shootings, but what it didn't do was leave me hungry for more. It left me curious for more Atlanta, and I have no doubt I'll watch every minute of this show until the Brothers Glover don't feel like making anymore of it."

Alan Sepinwall of HitFix wrote, "On the one hand, 'The Jacket' feels oddly muted as finale to such an exceptional debut season. Surely, a show with as great an opening year as this should go out with fireworks and/or huge laughs as a way to underline all that it achieved across the previous nine episodes. On the other, 'The Jacket' feels like the perfect way to close out Atlanta season 1. This was nearly always an understated show and one whose dominant mode was to just hang out with Earn and the guys and observe what happened." Hanh Nguyen of IndieWire gave the episode an "A" and wrote, "Glover had equated being black in America as being an outsider, and that lack of belonging is the final upsetting emotion we're left with. The show's true achievement isn't a literal picture of life what it means to be black, but rather the evocation of a host of feelings to overturn our own. Atlanta gives us the feels, and the better for it." Michael Arceneaux of Vulture gave the episode a 4 star rating out of 5 and wrote, "Kudos to Atlanta for ending this first season exactly how it needed to. I'm glad the pace and tone remained consistent throughout most of these ten episodes. It's been mentioned in this space before, but Donald Glover and the show's writers have done remarkably interesting things in terms of storytelling. And each actor has offered a strong performance. It's surely a recipe for even more great things to come."

Stephen Kornhaber of The Atlantic wrote, "It's a hopeful ending but not a happily-ever-after: Earn's further along than where he was before, but where he was before was further back than anyone realized. The trope of glory through hip-hop isn't on offer here, and neither is the American Dream of decisively conquering your conditions. It's a variant of what Andre said — now and forever, if you don’t move feet you don't eat." Michael Snydel of Paste wrote, "The season finale of Atlanta begins the same way as the pilot, and with a few exceptions, the same way as nearly every episode this season — with Earn waking up groggily from a fitful sleep. Atlanta is a show that's invested in visual symmetry and callbacks, and it's no doubt intentional that 'The Jacket' feels so much like a bookend to the pilot. But it also feels retroactively significant, a key to understanding a show filled with surrealism where the main character's only response can be reaction." Sonia Saraiya of Variety wrote, "The combination of both of these factors makes 'The Jacket' a particularly fascinating episode. It starts out with the premise for any number of stories and ends up with the thing found, but riddled with bulletholes, and eventually not even being the thing that matters. And while a police shootout occurs so randomly that it becomes forgettable, Earn’s look back at Van in the final few minutes of the episode takes up precious, weighty airtime."
