= Atlanta season 1 =

Season of television series

Atlanta
- Season 1
- Promotional poster
- Showrunner: Donald Glover
- Starring: Donald Glover; Brian Tyree Henry; Lakeith Stanfield; Zazie Beetz
- No. of episodes: 10

Release
- Original network: FX
- Original release: September 6 – November 1, 2016

Season chronology
- Next → Robbin' Season

The first season of the American television series Atlanta premiered on September 6, 2016. The season is produced by RBA, 343 Incorporated, MGMT. Entertainment, and FXP, with Donald Glover, Paul Simms, and Dianne McGunigle, serving as executive producers. Glover serves as creator and showrunner, and wrote four episodes for the season.

The series was given a 10-episode order in October 2015 and stars Donald Glover, Brian Tyree Henry, LaKeith Stanfield, and Zazie Beetz. The series follows Earn during his daily life in Atlanta, Georgia, as he tries to redeem himself in the eyes of his ex-girlfriend Van, who is also the mother of his daughter Lottie; as well as his parents and his cousin Alfred, who raps under the stage name "Paper Boi"; and Darius, Alfred's eccentric right-hand man.

The season premiered on September 6, 2016, with a two-episode premiere on FX. The series premiere received 1.08 million viewers with a 0.5 ratings share in the 18–49 demographics. The season ended on November 1, 2016, with an average of 0.88 million viewers. The season received critical acclaim, with critics praising its cast, writing, originality, and social commentary. At the 74th Golden Globe Awards, the season won Best Television Series – Musical or Comedy while Glover won Best Actor in a Television Series – Musical or Comedy. At the 69th Primetime Emmy Awards, the season was nominated for Outstanding Comedy Series, with Glover winning two awards for Lead Actor in a Comedy Series and Directing for a Comedy Series. The latter made Glover the first African-American to win the award. In September 2016, FX renewed the series for a second season.

== Cast and characters ==
=== Main ===
- Donald Glover as Earnest "Earn" Marks
- Brian Tyree Henry (Note: Henry is only credited for the episodes he appears in.) as Alfred "Paper Boi" Miles
- LaKeith Stanfield (Note: Stanfield is only credited for the episodes he appears in.) as Darius
- Zazie Beetz (Note: Beetz is only credited for the episodes she appears in.) as Vanessa "Van" Keefer

=== Recurring ===
- Harold House Moore as Swiff

=== Guest ===
- Isiah Whitlock Jr. as Raleigh Marks
- Jane Adams as Janice
- Quavo, Offset, and Takeoff as the Migos.
- Austin Crute as Justin Bieber
- Lloyd as himself
- Jaleel White as himself
- Alano Miller as Franklin Montague

== Episodes ==
No. overall	No. in season	Title	Directed by	Written by	Original release date	Prod. code	U.S. viewers (millions)
1	1	"The Big Bang"	Hiro Murai	Donald Glover	September 6, 2016	XAA01001	1.08
Earnest "Earn" Marks, a man experiencing homelessness, learns that his cousin, Alfred "Paper Boi" Miles, has become a semi-successful rapper. Earn asks Al if he can manage him, but Al turns him down, pointing out that Earn has not spoken to him since his mother's funeral. Earn proves his value as a manager by using subterfuge to get Al's song on a popular radio station, and goes to meet Al to discuss the possibility of employment. While talking, Al admits that he hates his music and is interrupted by a man smashing the side-view mirror on his car, leading to an altercation where he shoots the man in the chest. Title card: The city of Atlanta Opening song: "No Hook" by OJ Da Juiceman Closing song: "Paper Boi" by Stephen Glover
2	2	"Streets on Lock"	Hiro Murai	Stephen Glover	September 6, 2016	XAA01002	0.955
Earn and Al are arrested for their involvement in the shooting. Al is bailed out, while Earn waits all day to be processed, watching as a man in a relationship with a transgender woman argues with other detainees that he is straight, as well as officers beating a mentally ill man when he spits at them. The mother of his daughter Lottie, Vanessa "Van" Keefer, comes to pick him up when he is processed and bailed. Al finds that the shooting has made him even more popular, but notices a young child glamorizing the act of shooting someone because of him as well as a man in a Batman mask knocking on his door, both of which unnerve him. Title card: Wall of the prison Opening song: "Law" by Yo Gotti Closing song: "Grandma's Hands" by Bill Withers
3	3	"Go for Broke"	Hiro Murai	Stephen Glover	September 13, 2016	XAA01003	1.07
Al and his best friend Darius meet the Migos in the woods to do a drug deal, where they watch them kill a man. Earn offers to take Van out to dinner, but finds that he has an extremely meager budget to do so. As the night progresses, the restaurant they go to continually tries to upsell him, forcing him to call Al during the deal to ask for money. Earn and Van argue over his presence in Lottie's life as he drops her off, and he reports his debit card stolen in hopes of getting the money he spent refunded. Title card: Floor of a Zesto Opening song: "Skrt" by Kodak Black Closing song: "Spray the Champagne" by Migos
4	4	"The Streisand Effect"	Hiro Murai	Donald Glover	September 20, 2016	XAA01004	0.920
Al is shadowed by an obnoxious social media influencer named Zan, who acts friendly but trashes his music on social media. He hunts down and confronts Zan, but ends up getting strung along in his attempt to create a viral video involving a foul-mouthed child, eventually leaving after getting fed up. Low on money, Earn tries to sell his phone at a pawn shop, but Darius convinces him to instead buy a sword that he plans to flip for even more money. He eventually ends up purchasing and selling an in-demand Cane Corso dog for money months down the line, infuriating Earn because of his need for the money as soon as possible. Feeling guilty, Darius gives Earn his phone to sell, solidifying them as friends. Title card: Parking lot of the club Al meets Zan in Opening song: "Philosophers Throne" by Xavier Wulf Closing song: "Home Again" by Michael Kiwanuka
5	5	"Nobody Beats the Biebs"	Hiro Murai	Stephen Glover	September 27, 2016	XAA01005	0.860
Al plays basketball against Justin Bieber (depicted as a black man) at a charity event and gets into a fight with him because of his obnoxious nature. As he watches Bieber give a corny, manufactured apology, a reporter who refused to interview him earlier tells him that he needs to play his part as "the asshole" because of his status as a rapper. Earn networks at a VIP event at the venue after a woman mistakes him for a different black agent, but learns from her that the man she thinks he is betrayed her, and she promises to ruin him. Darius goes to a shooting range and fires at a target of a dog, starting an argument between the white and non-white customers and getting him thrown out. Title card: Basketball court floor Opening song: "Am I Black Enough For You?" by Billy Paul Closing song: "Forget About It" by Donald Glover
6	6	"Value"	Donald Glover	Donald Glover & Stefani Robinson	October 4, 2016	XAA01006	0.827
Van has dinner with a friend, where they debate over their lifestyles and the role of black women in society. They get high after Van forgets she has a drug test at her teaching job scheduled for the next day. She asks for Al for help, and he suggests storing someone else's clear urine in a condom and smuggling it in. She uses Lottie's, but the condom explodes when she takes it out, forcing her to tell her boss. Her boss reveals that the test was technically unnecessary, but because of her admission, she has to fire her. Title card: Tablecloth Opening song: "It's Forever" by The Ebonys Closing song: "Hit it and Quit It" by Funkadelic
7	7	"B.A.N."	Donald Glover	Donald Glover	October 11, 2016	XAA01007	0.770
The episode is presented as an episode of the fictional talk show Montague, hosted on the B.A.N., (Black American Network) also fictional. Al and a white woman well versed in LGBT issues are the guests because of Al's transphobic comments towards Caitlyn Jenner, which the two argue about until they reach an understanding, despite Montague trying to push them back into an argument. Montague brings on a man who claims to be "transracial" and is a white man in a black man's body, who Al mocks despite the woman insisting he be tolerant. The guest begins to spout homophobic and transphobic rhetoric, causing Al to laugh harder. Throughout the episode, fake commercials for both real and fictional products play. Closing song: "Oregon Spirt" by Rolf A. Krueger
8	8	"The Club"	Hiro Murai	Jamal Olori	October 18, 2016	XAA01008	0.948
At a nightclub, Al sends Earn to track down the owner and get his payment for being there. He continually ducks Earn until Earn corners him, where he explains that he will be vastly reducing Al's pay for his difficulty and poor attitude. Al sulks in his corner when an NBA star upstages him, meeting a woman he seems to get on with until she reveals that she has a boyfriend. Earn explains the situation with the owner, and Al intimidates him into giving up his full payment. A shooting happens outside the club, and Al is named as a suspect because of his robbery. Title card: Stains from drinks on Al's table Opening song: "Real Sisters" by Future Closing song: "I Can Dig It, Baby" by Little Beaver
9	9	"Juneteenth"	Janicza Bravo	Stefani Robinson	October 25, 2016	XAA01009	0.651
Earn agrees to go to a Juneteenth party hosted by a wealthy mixed race couple posing as Van's husband. Earn finds that the white husband is obsessed with African culture and black history in America, while the black wife is racist towards lower class black people. Van becomes upset when Earn goes overboard with praises he would never give her if he was not trying to make her look good. Earn loses his cool when the wife insults Al, deriding the party and the husband's obsessions as "dumb." As they drive away, he tries to apologize to Van, but she has him pull over and they have sex in the car. Title card: Tattoo on the back of a woman Earn sleeps with Opening song: "Change of the Guard" by Kamasi Washington Closing song: "Chain Gang" by Sam Cooke
10	10	"The Jacket"	Hiro Murai	Stephen Glover	November 1, 2016	XAA01010	0.786
After a night of partying, Earn loses his blue bomber jacket and tracks it to the house of his Uber driver, just as the driver, a drug dealer, is killed by the police while wearing the jacket. Earn searches its pockets for something he needs, but finds nothing. Al gives him a generous percent of his pay cut, and he gives it to Van after spending a peaceful night with her and Lottie. Earn's coworker gives him the item he needed from the jacket, having left it with him the night before: a key that unlocks his new home, a storage locker. Title card: The side of a wooden structure Opening song: "Broccoli" by DRAM Closing song: "Elevators (Me & You)" by Outkast

== Production ==
=== Development ===
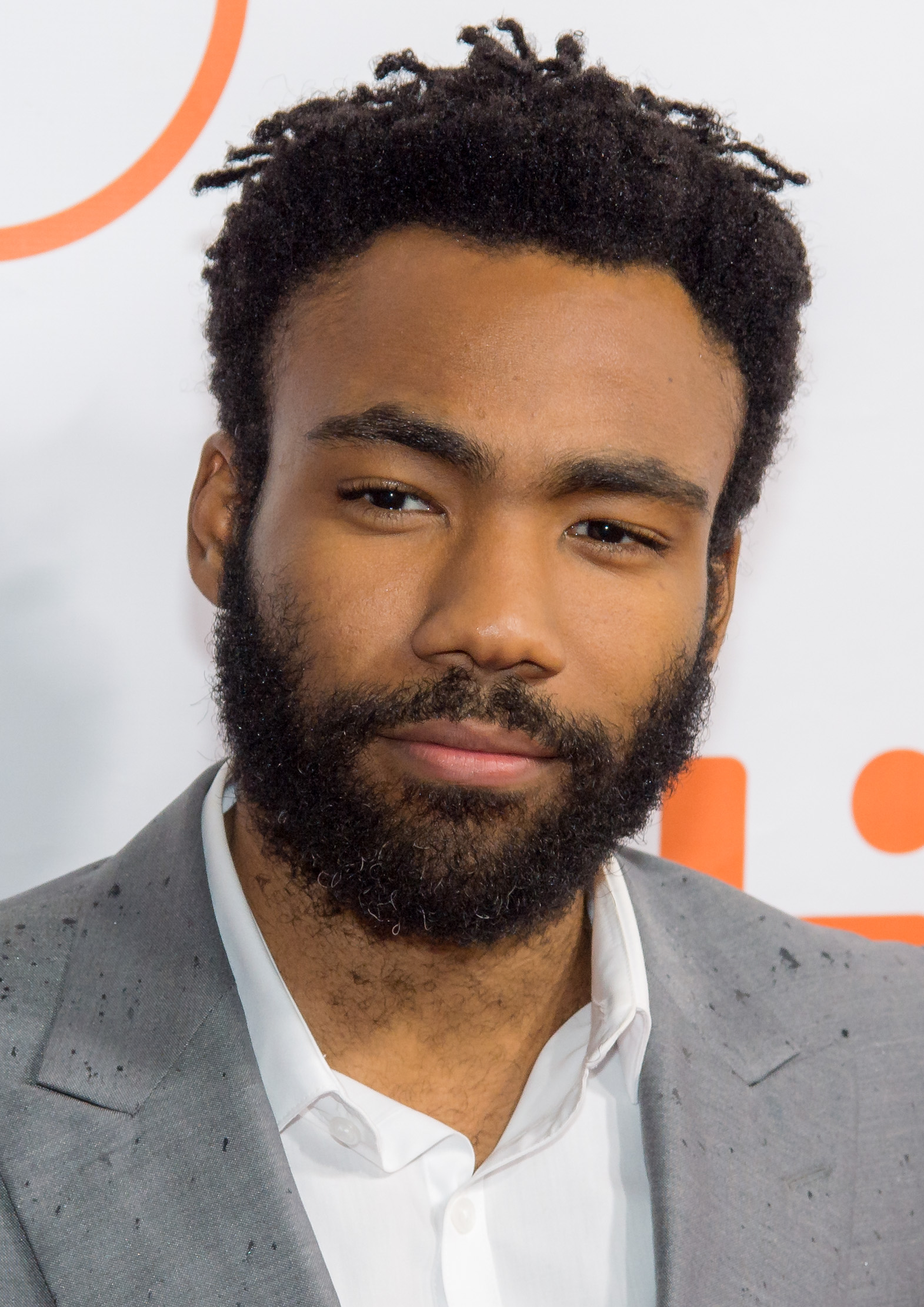
Donald Glover serves as creator, executive producer, director, writer and lead actor of the series.

The series was announced in August 2013, with Donald Glover set as lead actor, creator, writer and executive producer. The series was offered to many networks but Glover chose FX for its willingness to accommodate his music touring schedule with the development of the series. In December 2014, FX made a pilot order and Paul Simms and Dianne McGunigle joined as executive producers. In October 2015, FX made a 10-episode series order, with plans to release it in 2016. Nick Grad, President of Original Programming for FX Entertainment, commented "Donald Glover is a uniquely talented actor and performer who brings real-life experience to this subject matter. He, along with Paul Simms, has a very honest, sometimes serious, and funny perspective on life, the world of rap music and the city of Atlanta."

=== Writing ===
The series is also notable for having an all-black writing staff, which is virtually unheard of in American television. The writer's room consists of Glover himself, his brother Stephen Glover, and members of his rap collective 'Royalty' including Fam Udeorji (Glover's manager), Ibra Ake (Glover's longtime photographer), and Jamal Olori. Stefani Robinson, a writer for Man Seeking Woman, and Taofik Kolade round out the writer's room.

Glover jokingly referred to the series as "Twin Peaks with rappers". Glover, who grew up in Atlanta and also works as a musician, stated that "the city influenced the tone of the show". He also chose the city as "there's an active dialogue of how things should be. The dynamics of the economy play out really well. It informs for a cool environment." He commented on the development of the series, "There's so many screens that have to be filled now, between your television, your computer and your phone, that I think it's the perfect time to make something that I see, a perfect opportunity to combine everything that media is right now." The series makes constant use of the N-word, which Glover defended as "that's how people talk. It's just the way it is. Trying to pretend that people don't talk like that, like I don't, it's kind of silly. I feel like if we ignore that, people would immediately turn on the television and not know what world they're on."

Regarding the series' surrealism, Glover explained "There really isn't a limit to how abstract you can get, as long as you believe it. There has to be a grounded nature to something — if you have something that is grounded on some level, you can go anywhere. You just have to have it so that they’re abiding by their own rules every step of the way."

=== Casting ===
When the pilot was ordered, Glover was reported to play Earnest "Earn" Marks, "a college drop-out who taps into his own musical aspirations when his estranged family member finds sudden fame."

In July 2015, Brian Tyree Henry, LaKeith Stanfield and Zazie Beetz joined the series as the remaining cast members. Henry would play Alfred Miles, "Atlanta's hot of the moment rapper who plans to capitalize on the sudden fame as quickly as possible". Stanfield would play Darius, "Alfred's oddly talented right-hand man and musical collaborator". And Beetz would play Van, "a pragmatist caught up in a complicated relationship with Earn (Glover) due to their daughter".

=== Filming ===
Filming on the pilot began in July 2015 in Atlanta, with Hiro Murai directing the episode. Murai previously collaborated with Glover on music videos, commenting "It's obviously a different format. Even in the narrative format I've done, we've never had extensive scripted dialogue scenes and whatnot. But it felt like a natural extension of what Donald and I have done in the past. So in that sense it was a really nice, seamless transition."

In August 2016, it was reported that Glover would make his directorial debut, directing the sixth and seventh episode.

== Release ==
=== Broadcast ===
In July 2016, FX announced that the season would premiere on September 6, 2016.

=== Marketing ===
The first teaser debuted in June 2016, which was heavily inspired by the music video for "Drop" by The Pharcyde. A new second debuted the next month, with music from "Sleepless" by Flume. A full-length trailer was released in August 2016.

=== Home media release ===
The season was released on DVD in Region 1 on March 6, 2018.

== Reception ==
=== Ratings ===
Viewership and ratings per episode of Atlanta season 1
No.	Title	Air date	Rating (18–49)	Viewers (millions)	DVR (18–49)	DVR viewers (millions)	Total (18–49)	Total viewers (millions)
1	"The Big Bang"	September 6, 2016	0.5	1.08	0.4	—N/a	0.9^{1}	—N/a
2	"Streets on Lock"	September 6, 2016	0.5	0.955	—N/a	—N/a	—N/a	—N/a
3	"Go for Broke"	September 13, 2016	0.6	1.07	—N/a	—N/a	—N/a	—N/a
4	"The Streisand Effect"	September 20, 2016	0.5	0.920	—N/a	—N/a	—N/a	—N/a
5	"Nobody Beats the Biebs"	September 27, 2016	0.4	0.860	—N/a	—N/a	—N/a	—N/a
6	"Value"	October 4, 2016	0.4	0.827	0.4	—N/a	0.8	—N/a
7	"B.A.N."	October 11, 2016	0.4	0.770	0.6	1.05	1.0	1.82
8	"The Club"	October 18, 2016	0.4	0.948	0.6	0.97	1.0	1.92
9	"Juneteenth"	October 25, 2016	0.3	0.651	0.6	0.97	0.9	1.62
10	"The Jacket"	November 1, 2016	0.4	0.786	0.6	0.87	1.0	1.66

^1 Live +7 ratings were not available, so Live +3 ratings have been used instead.

=== Critical reception ===
The first season received widespread acclaim from television critics. The review aggregation website Rotten Tomatoes gives the first season an approval rating of 98% based on 141 reviews, with an average rating of 8.6/10. The website's critical consensus reads, "Ambitious and refreshing, Atlanta offers a unique vehicle for star and series creator Donald Glover's eccentric brand of humor — as well as a number of timely, trenchant observations." On Metacritic, the first season has a score of 90 out of 100, based on reviews from 37 critics, indicating "universal acclaim".

David Wiegand of the San Francisco Chronicle gave it a highly positive review, writing: "The scripts for the four episodes made available to critics are as richly nuanced as anything you'll see on TV or, to be sure, in a movie theater. You will not only know these characters after only one episode, you'll be hooked on them, as well. In so many areas, Atlanta sets the bar exceptionally high." Sonia Saraiya of Variety also praised the series, declaring it a "finished, cinematic, and beautiful production that may be one of the best new shows of the fall." Alan Sepinwall praised Glover's creativity, writing, "he wanted a chance to fail, and while not all of Atlanta works yet, it absolutely has that immersive quality Glover was hoping for."

==== Critics' top ten lists ====
The season topped many "Best of 2016" lists and was the second most mentioned series of the year.

2016
- No. 1 Business Insider
- No. 1 The New York Times
- No. 1 The Ringer
- No. 1 Rolling Stone
- No. 1 San Francisco Chronicle
- No. 1 Slant Magazine
- No. 1 Variety
- No. 2 The A.V. Club
- No. 2 Complex
- No. 2 Esquire
- No. 2 IGN
- No. 2 TVLine
- No. 2 USA Today
- No. 3 CinemaBlend
- No. 3 Collider
- No. 3 Consequence
- No. 3 The Daily Beast
- No. 3 The Hollywood Reporter
- No. 3 Paste
- No. 3 RogerEbert.com
- No. 5 Entertainment Weekly
- No. 5 Time
- No. 5 TV Guide
- No. 5 Vox
- No. 6 Adweek
- No. 6 Film School Rejects
- No. 6 Uproxx
- No. 6 The Washington Post
- No. 7 The Boston Globe
- No. 7 IndieWire
- No. 7 Newsday
- – Associated Press
- – The Atlantic
- – CNN
- – The Globe and Mail
- – The Huffington Post
- – Los Angeles Times
- – Vanity Fair

=== Awards and nominations ===
Award	Category	Nominees	Result	Ref.
American Film Institute Awards	Top 10 Television Programs	Atlanta	Won	
Critics' Choice Television Awards	Best Comedy Series	Atlanta	Nominated	
Critics' Choice Television Awards	Best Actor in a Comedy Series	Donald Glover	Won	
Directors Guild of America Awards	Outstanding Directorial Achievement for a Comedy Series	Donald Glover (for "B.A.N.")	Nominated	
Golden Globe Awards	Best Television Series – Musical or Comedy	Atlanta	Won	
Golden Globe Awards	Best Actor in a Television Series - Musical or Comedy	Donald Glover	Won	
Gotham Independent Film Awards	Breakthrough Series – Long Form	Atlanta	Won	
MTV Movie & TV Awards	Show of the Year	Atlanta	Nominated	
MTV Movie & TV Awards	Best Actor in a Show	Donald Glover	Nominated	
MTV Movie & TV Awards	Best Duo	Brian Tyree Henry and Keith Stanfield	Nominated	
NAACP Image Awards	Outstanding Comedy Series	Atlanta	Nominated	
NAACP Image Awards	Outstanding Actor in a Comedy Series	Donald Glover	Nominated	
NAACP Image Awards	Outstanding Directing in a Comedy Series	Donald Glover	Won	
NAACP Image Awards	Outstanding Writing in a Comedy Series	Donald Glover	Nominated	
Peabody Awards	Area of Excellence	Atlanta	Won	
People's Choice Awards	Favorite Cable TV Comedy	Atlanta	Nominated	
Primetime Emmy Awards	Outstanding Comedy Series	Atlanta	Nominated	
Primetime Emmy Awards	Outstanding Lead Actor in a Comedy Series	Donald Glover	Won	
Primetime Emmy Awards	Outstanding Directing for a Comedy Series	Donald Glover (for "B.A.N.")	Won	
Primetime Emmy Awards	Outstanding Writing for a Comedy Series	Donald Glover (for "B.A.N.")	Nominated	
Primetime Emmy Awards	Outstanding Writing for a Comedy Series	Stephen Glover (for "Streets on Lock")	Nominated	
Primetime Emmy Awards	Outstanding Casting for a Comedy Series	Alexa L. Fogel, Tara Feldstein Bennett, Chase Paris	Nominated	
Producers Guild of America Awards	Episodic Television, Comedy	Donald Glover, Dianne McGunigle, Paul Simms, Hiro Murai, Alex Orr	Won	
Writers Guild of America Awards	Comedy Series	Donald Glover, Stephen Glover, Stefani Robinson, Paul Simms	Won	
Writers Guild of America Awards	New Series	Donald Glover, Stephen Glover, Stefani Robinson, Paul Simms	Won	
Writers Guild of America Awards	Episodic Comedy	Stephen Glover (for "Streets on Lock")	Nominated	
TCA Awards	Program of the Year	Atlanta	Nominated	
TCA Awards	Outstanding Achievement in Comedy	Atlanta	Won	
TCA Awards	Outstanding New Program	Atlanta	Nominated	
TCA Awards	Individual Achievement in Comedy	Donald Glover	Won	
