= Juneteenth (Atlanta) =

- Atlanta episode
- Episode no.: Season 1 Episode 9
- Directed by: Janicza Bravo
- Written by: Stefani Robinson
- Cinematography by: Christian Sprenger
- Editing by: Isaac Hagy
- Production code: XAA01009
- Original air date: October 25, 2016
- Running time: 27 minutes

Guest appearances
- Cassandra Freeman as Monique Allen; Rick Holmes as Craig Allen

Episode chronology
← Previous "The Club"	Next → "The Jacket"
- Atlanta season 1

"Juneteenth" is the ninth episode of the first season of the American comedy-drama television series Atlanta. The episode was written by Stefani Robinson, and directed by Janicza Bravo. It was first broadcast on FX in the United States on October 25, 2016.

The series is set in Atlanta and follows Earnest "Earn" Marks, as he tries to redeem himself in the eyes of his ex-girlfriend Van, who is also the mother of his daughter Lottie; as well as his parents and his cousin Alfred, who raps under the stage name "Paper Boi"; and Darius, Alfred's eccentric right-hand man. In the episode, Earn and Van attend a Juneteenth-themed party from one of Van's upper class friends. The party soon turns uncomfortable when they meet her white husband, Craig, who seems fascinated by the African-American culture.

According to Nielsen Media Research, the episode was seen by an estimated 0.651 million household viewers and gained a 0.3 ratings share among adults aged 18–49. The episode received extremely positive reviews from critics, who praised the writing, performances and exploration of the subject matter.

== Plot ==
After a one-night stand, Earn (Donald Glover) is picked up by Van (Zazie Beetz) so they can attend a Juneteenth-themed party, hosted by her upper class friend, Monique (Cassandra Freeman). At the party, they meet Monique's white husband, Craig (Rick Holmes), whose personality seems to annoy Earn.

As Earn explores the mansion, he seems curious upon discovering Craig's study room, which is filled with African-American memorabilia. Craig takes pride on his knowledge of African-American culture, making Earn feel uncomfortable. He tells Van his frustrations, and she states that she wants to establish good relations with the upper class, telling him they must pretend to be more sophisticated. So they start pretending to be married in order to impress the guests. After one of the party guests asks Earn about him, he says Van does everything and is better than him. The situation prompts Van to go to the restroom, where she has a nervous breakdown.

Van later talks with Monique, who is aware of Craig's behavior and fascination with the culture. Earn listens to Craig give a poem based on Jim Crow and leaves the room, where he is approached by two valets who recognize him as Alfred's manager. Craig immediately recognizes him because of this and despite Van's insistence, their cover is blown to Monique. Monique orders the valets off, irritated with the help, and seems upset at Earn's job and even insults Alfred when Craig brings up the shooting incident. Earn then calls out Monique and Craig and both Earn and Van leave the mansion. As they drive, Van has Earn pull the car over and they start having sex.

== Production ==
=== Development ===
"Why my Auntie trying to make me go to one of these bougie Junteenth parties again? I don't like them sadity people and I'm gonna miss my shows. Le sigh."

— Official description in the press release for the episode.

In September 2016, FX announced that the ninth episode of the season would be titled "Juneteenth" and that it would be written by Stefani Robinson, and directed by Janicza Bravo. This was Robinson's second writing credit, and Bravo's first directing credit.

== Reception ==
=== Viewers ===
The episode was watched by 0.651 million viewers, earning a 0.3 in the 18–49 rating demographics on the Nielson ratings scale. This means that 0.3 percent of all households with televisions watched the episode. This was a 32% decrease from the previous episode, which was watched by 0.948 million viewers with a 0.4 in the 18–49 demographics.

With DVR factored, the episode was watched by 1.62 million viewers with a 0.9 in the 18–49 demographics.

=== Critical reviews ===
"Juneteenth" received extremely positive reviews from critics. Joshua Alston of The A.V. Club gave the episode a "B+" and wrote, "It’s hard not to think about the narrative looseness during a moment like the closing scene, in which a soused Van tells Earn to pull the car over and initiates sex after hours spent needling Earn about their odd relationship. Their physical reunion feels heavy and earned, pardon the pun, but also like it might never be mentioned again. Atlanta is about savoring the moment."

Alan Sepinwall of HitFix wrote, "'Juneteenth' is another remarkable half-hour of TV in a debut season full of them. It's one of the purely funniest episodes of Atlanta so far, as the Juneteenth party thrown by Van's friend turns into a parade of ridiculous people behaving ridiculously, and Earn and an increasingly drunk Van doing their best to hide their natural reactions to them. But it also works as an achingly poignant look at where things stand between the two of them now that Van is no longer the obvious breadwinner."

Michael Arceneaux of Vulture gave the episode a perfect 5 star rating out of 5 and wrote, "I'll be honest: I don't know how these two are going to make it work. I don't even know if they can. I want them to last, though. They offer a good balance to each other, and although much of their tension is rooted in Earn's precarious place in life, I like watching them move together. Their relationship has led to some of the best aspects of Atlanta's inaugural season. Let's hope they get closer to figuring it out in next week's finale." Michael Snydel of Paste wrote, "'Juneteenth' continues the season's prevailing interest in race, class, and self-definition, but it also uses those political themes to dissect the way that relationships can become a series of obligations, even as two people care about each other."

The episode drew attention for the character, Craig, who is played by Rick Holmes in the episode. TheWrap deemed Craig "the wokest white man we all love to hate", further adding "we applaud Craig for being woke and aware of the social injustices in the black community, but he's past being the cool ally and reached into dangerous territory of white privilege. Don't be Craig."
