= The Club (Atlanta) =

- Atlanta episode
- Episode no.: Season 1 Episode 8
- Directed by: Hiro Murai
- Written by: Jamal Olori
- Cinematography by: Christian Sprenger
- Editing by: Kyle Reiter
- Production code: XAA01008
- Original air date: October 18, 2016
- Running time: 27 minutes

Guest appearances
- Antoinette Robertson as Janice; Harold House Moore as Swiff

Episode chronology
← Previous "B.A.N."	Next → "Juneteenth"
- Atlanta season 1

"The Club" is the eighth episode of the first season of the American comedy-drama television series Atlanta. The episode was written by Jamal Olori, and directed by producer Hiro Murai. It was first broadcast on FX in the United States on October 18, 2016.

The series is set in Atlanta and follows Earnest "Earn" Marks, as he tries to redeem himself in the eyes of his ex-girlfriend Van, who is also the mother of his daughter Lottie; as well as his parents and his cousin Alfred, who raps under the stage name "Paper Boi"; and Darius, Alfred's eccentric right-hand man. In the episode, Earn, Alfred and Darius visit a night club to meet with a promoter who owes them money. Problems arise when the promoter avoids Earn to pay him while Alfred is jealous when a popular NBA player is in the club.

According to Nielsen Media Research, the episode was seen by an estimated 0.948 million household viewers and gained a 0.4 ratings share among adults aged 18–49. The episode received critical acclaim, with critics praising the performances and surrealistic aspects (particularly the invisible car).

== Plot ==
At a night club named "Primal", Earn (Donald Glover), Alfred (Brian Tyree Henry) and Darius (Lakeith Stanfield) are enjoying time at a private section of the club. Earn wants to meet with a promoter who owes him money while Alfred questions how to get into the VIP section of the club.

An Atlanta Hawks player, Marcus Miles, is in the VIP section and his appearance prompts a round of applause, while Alfred barely gets any. He shares his frustrations to Darius, who remarks that Marcus has an "invisible car", showing him photos of Marcus posing on an empty space but Alfred is unconvinced. Meanwhile, Earn approaches the promoter, Chris (Lucius Baston), who is also the club's manager. Chris promises to get him the money after some errands but he evades Earn at every errand, frustrating him. When he catches up with him, Chris manages to evade him by getting in a rotating wall, angering Earn even further. The bartender, noting Earn's frustration, tells him that if he does not like the place, he should leave as complaining doesn't make him "special".

Darius leaves the section for a moment and after interacting with the security guard with casual conversation, is rejected by the same security guard moments later, as he is carrying the wrong wristband, prompting him to leave the club. Alfred welcomes more people into his section to compete with Marcus, but ejects the males when he realizes some are just trying to get collaborations with him. To complicate matters, Marcus buys the entire liquor service for the night and is leaving, further frustrating Alfred. Earn continues talking with the bartender, who tips him by giving him instructions on how to enter the rotating wall through a fire alarm. He confronts Chris, who will pay him but for a reduced fee, as Alfred's expenses reduced the intended payment and failed to meet his contractual obligations. He pays him $750 (instead of $5,000) and tells Earn to leave.

Alfred tries to flirt with a woman, but she does not plan to give her contact information and even says she has a boyfriend. Earn then informs Alfred about the money, prompting an angry Alfred to confront Chris himself. He manhandles Chris, first punching him and he hands him the rest of the money. Alfred leaves with the money after slapping Chris with it, and he and one of his cohorts take three cases of beer as they leave. Chris calls the police after a moment of awe for Alfred’s presence. Outside the club, Earn and Alfred laugh at the situation when they and the bystanders note an argument, which escalates into a gunfight. Everyone leaves, with Miles seen driving his "invisible car", hitting many pedestrians. They meet with Darius at a diner to laugh about the events, when they see a news coverage of the shooting. The report states that Alfred is wanted for questioning for the robbery. A frustrated Alfred says "fuck the club."

== Production ==
=== Development ===
"Baller Alert! NFL players, not to mention Jeff Miles and the bottle boys at Primal tonight. Paper Boi gonna be in this thang too. Liiiiiiiittttttttt. I got pre sale bands."

— Official description in the press release for the episode.

In September 2016, FX announced that the eighth episode of the season would be titled "The Club" and that it would be written by Jamal Olori, and directed by producer Hiro Murai. This was Olori's first writing credit, and Murai's sixth directing credit.

=== Writing ===
The episode drew attention for the "invisible car", which starts as a joke made by Darius when describing Marcus Miles. In the episode's climax, as the bystanders flee from the shooting, Miles drives the car through the parking lot. TheWrap interpreted the use of the invisible car as to how "people, mostly stars, flaunt their money in the club. After seeing how much larger and more exciting Miles' VIP section was, Paper Boi was a little bothered by it so he bought some more drinks and invited more people into his section, which was countered by Miles buying the entire club. Miles' invisible car at the end could be a testament to the extent some people will go to in order to show off how rich they are. Like, you know buying an invisible car."

== Reception ==
=== Viewers ===
The episode was watched by 0.948 million viewers, earning a 0.4 in the 18-49 rating demographics on the Nielson ratings scale. This means that 0.4 percent of all households with televisions watched the episode. This was a 23% increase from the previous episode, which was watched by 0.770 million viewers with a 0.4 in the 18-49 demographics.

=== Critical reviews ===
"The Club" received critical acclaim. Joshua Alston of The A.V. Club gave the episode an "A−" and wrote, "As an episode of a loosely structured anthology, 'The Club' is another terrific installment in an excellent, exhilarating debut season. Darius, who I've missed dearly, is back in fine form and Brian Tyree Henry turns in yet another terrific performance. He's as good at playing abject frustration as anyone outside the cast of Veep. The single setting lends the episode a sense of structure, but it's ultimately like the rest of Atlanta's episodes, a candy bowl full of hilarious, absurd, keenly observed moments."

Alan Sepinwall of HitFix wrote, "After a couple of experimental episodes in a row, 'The Club' is a pretty straightforward outing. The guys hang out, Earn and Alfred each brush up against the limits of Paper Boi's modest celebrity, and there are a few surreal touches, Darius is mostly off marching to the beat of his own drummer, and the cops may have to get involved again. If a show so determined to defy expectations could be said to have a formula, 'The Club' is a clear – and entertaining – example of that formula."

Michael Arceneaux of Vulture gave the episode a 4 star rating out of 5 and wrote, "Slow-moving or not, what's happening on Atlanta is long overdue. I've had some critiques, but as a whole, this is such an impressive first season. It reminds me of a really good first album — with little tweaks here and there, it'd be a true masterpiece." Michael Snydel of Paste wrote, "After last week's form-breaking, politically urgent episode, it was always going to be difficult for Atlanta to reach the same heights this week. 'The Club' is much more in line with the rest of the season, but even as it's less ambitious, it's still a pretty strong episode."

The episode's use of "Knuck If You Buck" received attention by some audience viewers, with some criticizing the subdued nature of clubgoers depicted when the song played. TheWrap wrote, "Unlike most TV shows or movies, the club scene in Atlanta wasn't depicted as a ritzy place where everyone was beautiful and dressed to the nines, having the time of their lives. Primal, a nightclub in Atlanta and on Atlanta, depicted the real club experience: Earn doesn't drink, Darius left early to eat cereal and play video games and Paper Boi was bored out of his mind. So when 'Knuck If You Buck' came on during the episode, most people were naturally expecting the show to stay true to its roots and have the proper response to such a monumental song. But then again, we should have all learned by now to not expect anything normal from Donald Glover."
