= The Streisand Effect (Atlanta) =

- Atlanta episode
- Episode no.: Season 1 Episode 4
- Directed by: Hiro Murai
- Written by: Donald Glover
- Cinematography by: Christian Sprenger
- Editing by: Isaac Hagy
- Production code: XAA01004
- Original air date: September 20, 2016
- Running time: 24 minutes

Guest appearance
- Freddie Kuguru as Zan

Episode chronology
← Previous "Go for Broke"	Next → "Nobody Beats the Biebs"
- Atlanta season 1

"The Streisand Effect" is the fourth episode of the first season of the American comedy-drama television series Atlanta. The episode was written by series creator and main actor Donald Glover, and directed by producer Hiro Murai. It was first broadcast on FX in the United States on September 20, 2016.

The series is set in Atlanta and follows Earnest "Earn" Marks, as he tries to redeem himself in the eyes of his ex-girlfriend Van, who is also the mother of his daughter Lottie; as well as his parents and his cousin Alfred, who raps under the stage name "Paper Boi"; and Darius, Alfred's eccentric right-hand man. In the episode, Earn tries to trade his phone for money but Darius convinces him to trade it for a katana and then a dog, so he can get more money. Meanwhile, Alfred is annoyed by the presence of a social media influencer named Zan, who starts mocking and trash-talking him on social media.

According to Nielsen Media Research, the episode was seen by an estimated 0.920 million household viewers and gained a 0.5 ratings share among adults aged 18–49. The episode received positive reviews from critics, who praised the performances (particularly Lakeith Stanfield) and humor.

== Plot ==
Earn (Donald Glover) and Alfred (Brian Tyree Henry) talk outside a club, when they are approached by a social media personality named Zan (Freddie Kuguru). Zan annoys them with his personality and tries to make them buy some of his merch, which they refuse. He further infuriates Alfred by trying to brush off Darius (Lakeith Stanfield) until Alfred tells him he is with them. After taking photos of them and giving his phone number to Earn, Zan leaves.

The next day, Alfred finds that Zan is trash-talking him on social media and starts replying back, ignoring Earn and Darius. Alfred is further infuriated when Zan starts trolling him with many videos and memes. Earn and Darius then go to a pawn shop, where Earn wants to trade his phone for money. However, Darius convinces Earn to trade his phone for a katana, indicating he could get him even more money in the long term. Despite hesitating and needing the money, Earn trades his phone for the katana. They then go to a warehouse, where Darius trades the katana for a Cane Corso, intending to make money off it.

Having discovered Zan's job thanks to a bartender, Alfred confronts him but then accepts to join him in the car as he delivers a pizza with a kid in the backseat. Zan explains that he views Alfred as exploiting his culture for profit, while Zan exploits him back on it for business. He also reveals that the kid is not his son, but is actually his partner on Vine, with Alfred expressing surprise at his foul-mouthed nature. They arrive at the destination, where Alfred sees that Zan sends the kid to deliver the pizza. The man answering the door takes the pizza, robs the boy, and then shuts the door. Alfred is taken aback and is even more disgusted to see Zan recording the kid while he knocks at the door. Alfred then exits the car and leaves the scene.

In the outskirts, Earn and Darius deliver the dog to a man, intending to make puppies with another dog, with Earn getting $2,000 for it. However, Earn is shocked to find that he won't get the money for a few months. Earn is frustrated, as he, Van, and Lottie needed the money immediately. To compensate, Darius hands over his phone to Earn, telling him to trade it. Earn accepts it and Darius remarks "we are friends now" as he enters the car.

== Production ==
=== Development ===
"Paper Boi is tripping about this blog stuff but it's just Twitter bruh. It's just entertainment. Somebody needs to get Earn some money. Skreetmoney Worldwide man."

— Official description in the press release for the episode.

In August 2016, FX announced that the fourth episode of the season would be titled "The Streisand Effect" and that it would be written by series creator and main actor Donald Glover and directed by producer Hiro Murai. This was Donald Glover's second writing credit, and Murai's fourth directing credit.

== Reception ==
=== Viewers ===
The episode was watched by 0.920 million viewers, earning a 0.5 in the 18-49 rating demographics on the Nielson ratings scale. This means that 0.5 percent of all households with televisions watched the episode. This was a 15% decrease from the previous episode, which was watched by 1.074 million viewers with a 0.6 in the 18-49 demographics.

=== Critical reviews ===
"The Streisand Effect" received positive reviews from critics. Joshua Alston of The A.V. Club gave the episode a "B+" and wrote, "Atlanta has become a show that works best in hindsight, and one that almost requires that each episode be viewed multiple times. Once you have a better idea of what the episode is doing, it's easier to relax and let it wash over you."

Alan Sepinwall of HitFix wrote, "Atlanta has very smartly told smaller stories, like last week's pairing of Earn struggling to pay for a mid-priced dinner with Van while Alfred and Darius work through a drug deal, or tonight's duo of short stories, as Darius' offer to make Earn some extra cash proves more complicated than Earn expected, while Alfred foolishly tries to engage with one of his trolls." Michael Arceneaux of Vulture gave the episode a 3 star rating out of 5 and wrote, "One of the things I like most about Atlanta is how the story develops like short ribs cooking in a slow cooker. Even so, I don't really think that deliberate pace works especially well for 'The Streisand Effect.' The Zan story line could've been executed differently; he seemed like an inspired character at first, but he quickly went flat. I'm still very interested in seeing how Alfred deals with fame, so perhaps he'll return with more depth in a future episode."

Michael Snydel of Paste wrote, "'The Streisand Effect' is all about facing Earn and Miles with concrete representations of these conflicts, whether it's Miles grappling with his own place in hip-hop, or Earn realizing that it takes more than ambition to succeed." Grant Ridner of PopMatters gave the episode an 8 out of 10 rating and wrote, "Ultimately, this episode is a rich character study that further familiarizes us with Atlanta's three stars, so that when the stakes begin to rise we'll be fully locked in and invested. The show's doing the unglamorous narrative and character work here, but it's clear that the journey we're on with Earn, Alfred, and Darius wouldn't work without these quieter moments. 'The Streisand Effect' should be a hit with Paper Boi fans and #zansexuals alike."
