= Streets on Lock =

- Atlanta episode
- Episode no.: Season 1 Episode 2
- Directed by: Hiro Murai
- Written by: Stephen Glover
- Cinematography by: Christian Sprenger
- Editing by: Isaac Hagy
- Production code: XAA01002
- Original air date: September 6, 2016
- Running time: 23 minutes

Guest appearances
- Luke Forbes as Johnny; Priah Ferguson as Asia

Episode chronology
← Previous "The Big Bang"	Next → "Go for Broke"
- Atlanta season 1

"Streets on Lock" is the second episode of the first season of the American comedy-drama television series Atlanta. The episode was written by story editor Stephen Glover, and directed by producer Hiro Murai. It was first broadcast on FX in the United States on September 6, 2016, airing back-to-back with the previous episode, "The Big Bang".

The series is set in Atlanta and follows Earnest "Earn" Marks, as he tries to redeem himself in the eyes of his ex-girlfriend Van, who is also the mother of his daughter Lottie; as well as his parents and his cousin Alfred, who raps under the stage name "Paper Boi"; and Darius, Alfred's eccentric right-hand man. In the episode, Earn is forced to remain in custody while he awaits for Van to bail him out, finding many of the people there are victims of many issues. Meanwhile, Alfred begins to experience his fame rising, much to his chagrin.

According to Nielsen Media Research, the episode was seen by an estimated 0.955 million household viewers and gained a 0.5 ratings share among adults aged 18–49. The episode received critical acclaim, with critics praising the writing and the episode's exploration of police brutality, homophobia, transphobia, and mental illness. Stephen Glover received an Outstanding Writing for a Comedy Series nomination at the 69th Primetime Emmy Awards and an Episodic Comedy nomination at the 69th Writers Guild of America Awards.

== Plot ==
In the aftermath of the shooting incident, Earn (Donald Glover) and Alfred (Brian Tyree Henry) are awaiting bail at the police station and are making fun of many of the people detained. Alfred is bailed out of his disorderly conduct charge by Darius (Lakeith Stanfield), but Earn is unable to get bailed as his name is not even in the system database.

With Van (Zazie Beetz) not answering her phone calls, Earn is unable to leave and is forced to stay in a waiting room, where the guards are extremely strict about his behavior. He talks with a man who was arrested and charged with public intoxication despite only drinking two beer cans after meeting with a friend after an 11-year absence, with the friend actually being just one row in front of him. Earn also sees a mentally ill man, who has been in the station for weeks, drinking water from the toilet, with the guards not caring for getting him help. When the man spits on a guard, he is beaten and restrained by the guards.

Alfred starts experiencing his fame rising, with more people recognizing him. He receives special treatment, such as getting special "lemon-pepper wet" chicken wings and constantly being asked for photos. Nevertheless, Alfred is not ecstatic about this, especially when he sees a kid with a toy gun imitating the events of the shooting. He is later visited by a man wearing a Batman mask, who then flees when he sees him. Back at the station, Earn sees a man who is talking with his ex-girlfriend while Earn is seated between them. The man is suddenly mocked by the people in the waiting room, who accuse him of being gay, as his ex-girlfriend is transgender. Earn is eventually bailed out by Van, who picks him up with Lottie in the back seat, with Earn remarking she won't remember this.

== Production ==
=== Development ===
"See every rapper think he a thug, well you do the crime, you do the time. Dont drop the soap haha. Free my uncle Jay!"

— Official description in the press release for the episode.

In August 2016, FX announced that the second episode of the season would be titled "Streets on Lock" and that it would be written by story editor Stephen Glover and directed by producer Hiro Murai. This was Stephen Glover's first writing credit, and Murai's second directing credit.

== Reception ==
=== Viewers ===
The episode was watched by 0.955 million viewers, earning a 0.5 in the 18-49 rating demographics on the Nielson ratings scale. This means that 0.5 percent of all households with televisions watched the episode. This was a slight decrease from the previous episode, which was watched by 1.084 million viewers with a 0.5 in the 18-49 demographics.

=== Critical reviews ===
"Streets on Lock" received critical acclaim. Joshua Alston of The A.V. Club gave the episode an "A" and wrote, "'Streets On Lock' goes a long way towards introducing Glover's Atlanta, and the result is spectacular. I can't remember the last time I saw a sitcom appear to become its best self in episode two."

Ben Travers of IndieWire wrote, "Glover conveys a familiar TV space in an authentic, familiar way that lulls you into a casual acceptance before smacking you in the face with why such a relaxed attitude is exactly the problem." Michael Arceneaux of Vulture gave the episode a perfect 5 star rating out of 5 and wrote, "Earn may be failing, but Atlanta is not. For a show to tackle a rapper's ambivalence about fame, mass incarceration, the plight of mental health care in America, homophobia, and transphobia in 22 minutes without overwhelming its audience is quite impressive." Grant Ridner of PopMatters wrote, "after just 44 minutes in the show's world, it's hard to imagine anything less than sterling execution from Glover and the rest of the team."

=== Awards and nominations ===
Award	Category	Nominees	Result	Ref.
Primetime Emmy Awards	Outstanding Writing for a Comedy Series	Stephen Glover	Nominated	
Writers Guild of America Awards	Episodic Comedy	Stephen Glover	Nominated	
