= Go for Broke (Atlanta) =

- Atlanta episode
- Episode no.: Season 1 Episode 3
- Directed by: Hiro Murai
- Written by: Stephen Glover
- Cinematography by: Christian Sprenger
- Editing by: Kyle Reiter
- Production code: XAA01003
- Original air date: September 13, 2016
- Running time: 27 minutes

Episode chronology
← Previous "Streets on Lock"	Next → "The Streisand Effect"
- Atlanta season 1

"Go for Broke" is the third episode of the first season of the American comedy-drama television series Atlanta. The episode was written by story editor Stephen Glover, and directed by producer Hiro Murai. It was first broadcast on FX in the United States on September 13, 2016.

The series is set in Atlanta and follows Earnest "Earn" Marks, as he tries to redeem himself in the eyes of his ex-girlfriend Van, who is also the mother of his daughter Lottie; as well as his parents and his cousin Alfred, who raps under the stage name "Paper Boi"; and Darius, Alfred's eccentric right-hand man. In the episode, Earn is "broke" on his payday but still goes on a dinner date with Van, going to a restaurant that will be financially suitable. However, due to a change in ownership, the restaurant is now different and starts offering expensive meals. Meanwhile, Alfred and Darius set to make a drug deal with a fictional version of Migos.

According to Nielsen Media Research, the episode was seen by an estimated 1.074 million household viewers and gained a 0.6 ratings share among adults aged 18–49. The episode received extremely positive reviews from critics, who praised the performances, writing, dark humor and the scenes with Migos.

== Plot ==
At a fast food restaurant, Earn (Donald Glover) wants to order a kids' meal to save money. However, the cashier refuses to sell him the meal, indicating that he must have a kid with him and order it. Frustrated with the terms, Earn just asks for a cup, intending to fill it with water. He actually fills it with Fanta, realizing that a janitor is watching him.

(“Skrt” by Kodak Black plays)

As they prepare for bed, Van (Zazie Beetz) chastises Earn for his failure in helping with Lottie. Earn attempts to make up by taking her to dinner the next day, which she accepts. The next day, Earn finds that he only has $96 in his bank account, which is reduced to just $62 due to other expenses. He takes his coworker and friend Swiff's suggestion to take Van to a restaurant that will benefit him financially. Meanwhile, Alfred (Brian Tyree Henry) and Darius (Lakeith Stanfield) prepare to make a drug deal with a gang named "Migos" (a fictional version of the hip-hop group) with Darius handcuffing himself to the briefcase with the product. They arrive at their RV, where they are horrified to see that the gang has a man kidnapped.

At the restaurant, Earn finds that due to a change in the restaurant's leadership, the restaurant is now focused on seafood. The waitress starts upselling Van while Earn sees that he won't be able to pay the now-increasing prices. When the check arrives, Earn is disappointed to see the figure exceeds his salary. Back at the RV, the gang decides to let the man go but Quavo fires at him with a rifle, killing him. As Migos talk with Alfred and Darius, Earn calls Alfred to ask for $20 in his account to pay for the dinner, nearly exposing their plan in front of Migos. Alfred and Darius complete the deal and leave with the briefcase. At Van's house, she and Earn discuss their situations and struggles. Later, Earn tries to report his debit card stolen as he drinks champagne, which leaves him disgusted.

== Production ==
=== Development ===
"This man Earn broke as hell. How you gone go out on a date with no money? Umm mhmm these Atlanta dudes trifling. But Ok, Paper Boi might really be about that life tho."

— Official description in the press release for the episode.

In August 2016, FX announced that the third episode of the season would be titled "Go for Broke" and that it would be written by story editor Stephen Glover and directed by producer Hiro Murai. This was Stephen Glover's second writing credit, and Murai's third directing credit.

=== Filming ===
The scenes involving Migos were filmed outside Henry County, Georgia in two days.

== Reception ==
=== Viewers ===
The episode was watched by 1.074 million viewers, earning a 0.6 in the 18-49 rating demographics on the Nielson ratings scale. This means that 0.6 percent of all households with televisions watched the episode. This was a slight increase from the previous episode, which was watched by 0.955 million viewers with a 0.5 in the 18-49 demographics.

=== Critical reviews ===
"Go for Broke" received extremely positive reviews from critics. Joshua Alston of The A.V. Club gave the episode an "A−" and wrote, "'Go For Broke' is a really unusual half-hour of television. It's expositional, but not clumsy. It's weird, but in a really plausible way. And somehow it manages to marry two stories that are so radically different, they shouldn't work together nearly as well as they do."

Alan Sepinwall of HitFix wrote, "Murai and the other directors shoot the series in a way that feels simultaneously raw and dreamlike, where strange and violent things can occur around Earn and it almost feels like they can't have happened." Michael Arceneaux of Vulture gave the episode a 4 star rating out of 5 and wrote, "Alfred's trip into the forest was funny to watch, but I'll be honest: I was drawn more to Earn and how complicated it is to pursue a dream when the responsibilities of adulthood begin steering you in another direction." Grant Ridner of PopMatters gave the episode an 8 out of 10 rating and wrote, "Overall, 'Go For Broke' is another stellar early entry from Atlanta, and seems like the kind of episode that the show could keep churning out for the next five years."
