= Value (Atlanta) =

- Atlanta episode
- Episode no.: Season 1 Episode 6
- Directed by: Donald Glover
- Written by: Donald Glover; Stefani Robinson
- Cinematography by: Christian Sprenger
- Editing by: Isaac Hagy
- Production code: XAA01006
- Original air date: October 4, 2016
- Running time: 27 minutes

Guest appearance
- Aubin Wise as Jayde

Episode chronology
← Previous "Nobody Beats the Biebs"	Next → "B.A.N."
- Atlanta season 1

"Value" is the sixth episode of the first season of the American comedy-drama television series Atlanta. The episode was written by series creator and main actor Donald Glover and Stefani Robinson, and directed by Glover in his directorial debut. It was first broadcast on FX in the United States on October 4, 2016.

The series is set in Atlanta and follows Earnest "Earn" Marks, as he tries to redeem himself in the eyes of his ex-girlfriend Van, who is also the mother of his daughter Lottie; as well as his parents and his cousin Alfred, who raps under the stage name "Paper Boi"; and Darius, Alfred's eccentric right-hand man. The episode deviates from the previous episodes, instead focusing on Van, while Earn and Alfred appear in smaller roles. Van feels pressured when she smokes marijuana while going out with a friend and then has to take a drug test the next day at her school job.

According to Nielsen Media Research, the episode was seen by an estimated 0.827 million household viewers and gained a 0.4 ratings share among adults aged 18–49. The episode received critical acclaim, with critics praising Zazie Beetz's performance and the episode's focus on Van's character development.

== Plot ==
Van (Zazie Beetz) has dinner at a luxury restaurant with a friend, Jayde (Aubin Wise). Jayde is a WAG, dating an NBA player and going on vacations in Europe. The conversation then turns to talk about Earn (Donald Glover), with Jayde expressing her discomfort with Van still being with him, telling her she must know her "value".

Jayde then invites her friend Kevin and one of his friends, C.J., to join them. Van is taken aback by their nature and leaves. At the parking garage, Jayde apologizes to Van for her attitude and offers to smoke marijuana, which she accepts. At the rooftop of the garage, they continue smoking and reconcile for what happened. The next morning, Van wakes up in her house, but is horrified to remember that she has to take a drug test that day. She asks Jayde for help, but she is unable to find anything useful. As Earn arrives to play with Lottie, Van tries to find ways to pass the test.

Desperate, Van contacts Alfred (Brian Tyree Henry) for help. While Alfred tells her he won't get anyone to buy urine, she could alter it with a simple method. Van removes the urine from Lottie's diapers, placing it on a condom and ties it to her leg. At her school job, she goes to the restroom to take the test. However, while untying the condom, it accidentally breaks and spills it out. She is later called by the school principal for not taking the test and she admits to smoking marijuana. The principal says that she understands her situation and that the tests weren't really important for her, but due to Van's confession, she will be fired within one week. She returns to one of her classes, dejected and is frustrated to see one of her black students in whiteface.

== Production ==
=== Development ===
"I love my bestie for real but I can't stand her neither. Van just jealous cause her girl out here jet settin and poppin. Ok girl get yours."

— Official description in the press release for the episode.

In September 2016, FX announced that the sixth episode of the season would be titled "Value" and that it would be written by series creator and main actor Donald Glover and Stefani Robinson, and directed by Glover. This was Donald Glover's third writing credit, Robinson's first writing credit, and Donald Glover's first directing credit.

=== Filming ===
In August 2016, it was reported that Glover would make his directorial debut with the episode. Producer Hiro Murai praised Glover's directing and the episode's focus on Van, "It's a funny dynamic that she fills a role in this show because it is about these guys in this male-centric world, this hip-hop world. So I think it'll give you a nice window into the other side of that, where Van's coming from and how she fits into that world rather than being like a foil or an obstacle for Earn."

== Reception ==
=== Viewers ===
The episode was watched by 0.827 million viewers, earning a 0.4 in the 18-49 rating demographics on the Nielson ratings scale. This means that 0.4 percent of all households with televisions watched the episode. This was a slight decrease from the previous episode, which was watched by 0.860 million viewers with a 0.4 in the 18-49 demographics.

=== Critical reviews ===
"Value" received critical acclaim. Joshua Alston of The A.V. Club gave the episode an "A" and wrote, "'Value' is a tough break for Van, Earn, and Lottie, but it's an outright triumph for Atlanta, which has officially allayed the biggest fear about the show going forward. Can these characters carry the weight of an entire episode? The answer, judging from the terrific writing and Zazie Beetz' stellar performance, is a resounding yes."

Alan Sepinwall of HitFix wrote, "Atlanta so far has been flexible enough to become whatever it wants from week to week, so it's not surprising that we would get an episode like 'Value', in which Earn and Alfred barely appear (and Darius is absent altogether) while the focus is on a misadventure of Van's. Still, it's impressive how satisfying the episode turned out to be, what a good job it did changing our impression of Van, and feeling very much of a piece with previous outings even though the guys were barely in it." Michael Arceneaux of Vulture gave the episode a 4 star rating out of 5 and wrote, "As Donald Glover has made clear, Atlanta doesn't go out of its way to offer grand statements about race or class. Nevertheless, Van's ordeal in 'Value' tells an especially smart story about the burden of single mothers — especially black mothers who hold their families together. It's easy to understand why Van desires a night of release, and it's sad how quickly she gets punished for indulging such a momentary pleasure."

Michael Snydel of Paste wrote, "After last week's entertaining but shallow dive into media perception and the politics of how to conduct oneself as a celebrity, this week's episode is comparatively much smaller. Throwing away the two/three story system of the last few weeks, it's a single well-constructed, funny, and effortlessly smart story about Van, a character who’s previously been pushed into the background." Grant Ridner of PopMatters gave the episode an 8 out of 10 rating and wrote, "With 'Value', we finally get a long-awaited Van-centric episode, and Zazie Beetz carries the weight of the arc effortlessly."
