= Go for broke =

Go for broke or going for broke may refer to:

== Films ==
- Go for Broke! (1951 film), a film about the 442nd Infantry Regiment
- Go For Broke a.k.a. Tutto per tutto, a.k.a. All Out (1968 Italian spaghetti Western directed by Umberto Lenzi)
- Going for Broke (1977 film), a Danish film
- Go for Broke (2002 film), a film written by Jean-Claude La Marre
- Going For Broke (2003 film), a 2003 television film starring Delta Burke
- Go for Broke: An Origin Story, a 2018 film; see 442nd Infantry Regiment (United States) § In popular culture

== Music ==
- Going for Broke (album), a 1984 album by Eddy Grant
- "Go for Broke", a song in Machine Gun Kelly's album Bloom

== Other uses ==
- "Go For Broke", the unit motto of the US Army's historic 442nd Regimental Combat Team and subsequent use as a rallying cry for the Japanese-American community
- Go For Broke (game), an unlicensed variant on the game Monopoly
- Go for Broke Monument, commemorating Japanese Americans who served in the United States Army during World War II, including the 442nd and the 100th
- "Go for Broke" (Atlanta), 2016 TV episode
- "Going for Broke", episode 14 of the sixth season of Alvin and the Chipmunks (1983)
