= B.A.N. (Atlanta) =

- Atlanta episode
- Episode no.: Season 1 Episode 7
- Directed by: Donald Glover
- Written by: Donald Glover
- Production code: XAA01007
- Original air date: October 11, 2016
- Running time: 24 minutes

Guest appearances
- Niles Stewart as Antoine Smalls/Harrison Booth; Alano Miller as Franklin Montague; Mary Kraft as Dr. Deborah Holt; Tim McAdams as Charger Man; Kevin Michael Richardson as Wally the Wolf (voice); Cree Summer as Kids (voice); Dave Willis as Cop (voice); Emmett Hunter as Ahmad White

Episode chronology
← Previous "Value"	Next → "The Club"
- Atlanta season 1

"B.A.N." is the seventh episode in the first season of the FX series Atlanta. The episode depicts Paper Boi being interviewed on Montague, a talk show on the fictional Black American Network (B.A.N). The entire episode is shot in the style of a block of television programming and includes both footage from the talk show and fake commercials.

The episode originally aired on October 11, 2016. It was written and directed by series creator Donald Glover. Glover won a Primetime Emmy Award for Outstanding Directing for a Comedy Series and was nominated for a Directors Guild of America Award for Outstanding Directing for a Comedy Series for directing the episode.

== Plot ==
After Paper Boi (Brian Tyree Henry) makes a controversial tweet stating that he would never have sex with Caitlyn Jenner, Earn gets him a spot on an interview show hosted by Franklin Montague (Alano Miller) on the B.A.N. (aka the Black American Network). In the awkward interview, Paper Boi debates with fellow guest, transgender activist Dr. Deborah Holt (Mary Kraft). At first the two clash over race and gender, but later come to some agreement. The interview deteriorates into arguing when a new guest named Antoine Smalls (Niles Stewart) joins the round table. Smalls believes that his name is Harrison Booth and he is a 35 year-old white man from Colorado.

Meanwhile, a series of Dodge Charger commercials air on the channel, but they prove to just be a surreal interlude of an Atlanta man (Tim McAdams) celebrating his divorce. Other commercials air during the segment, including ads for real-life products like Arizona iced tea, Mickey's malt liquor and Swisher Sweets, as well as fictional items like Coconut Crunchos Cereal and a dubious self-improvement service.

The Coconut Crunchos segment is a reference to police brutality.

== Production ==
Donald Glover wrote and directed "B.A.N"; however, he does not appear onscreen in the episode. His character Earn is addressed briefly by Paper Boi, implying he is either off-camera or backstage at the studio where "Montague" is filmed. The characters of Darius and Van do not appear in the episode either.

== Reception ==
The episode earned generally positive reviews from critics. Joshua Alston of The A.V. Club wrote that the episode "feels a little too experimental", while The Washington Post praised the episode and said that Atlanta is "the most random yet thought-provoking show on television".

Glover won an Emmy Award for Outstanding Directing for a Comedy Series for directing the episode. He is the first black director in the history of the Emmys to win this particular award. He was also nominated for a Directors Guild of America Award for Outstanding Directing for a Comedy Series for this episode.
