= The Big Bang (Atlanta) =

- Atlanta episode
- Episode no.: Season 1 Episode 1
- Directed by: Hiro Murai
- Written by: Donald Glover
- Production code: XAA01001
- Original air date: September 6, 2016
- Running time: 27 minutes

Guest appearances
- Myra Lucretia Taylor as Mrs. Marks; Isiah Whitlock Jr. as Raleigh Marks; Harold House Moore as Swiff

Episode chronology
← Previous —	Next → "Streets on Lock"
- Atlanta season 1

"The Big Bang" is the pilot episode of American comedy-drama television series Atlanta. It originally aired on FX on September 6, 2016, back-to-back with the second episode "Streets on Lock". The pilot episode focuses on Earn Marks trying to convince his rapper cousin Alfred to let him be his manager. The episode was written by series creator Donald Glover (who also plays Earn) and directed by Hiro Murai. On September 7, 2016, FX released the first two episodes of Atlanta on YouTube for free.

== Plot ==
The series opens with a confrontation between local Atlanta rapper Alfred "Paper Boi" Miles (Brian Tyree Henry) and a man who damages Alfred's car for no apparent reason. Alfred's cousin Earnest "Earn" Marks (Donald Glover) tries to mediate the situation whilst stoned sidekick Darius (Lakeith Stanfield) has a sensation of déjà vu. The episode flashes back to earlier in the day where the life of Earn is shown. Earn is a homeless Princeton dropout, living with his daughter's mother Vanessa "Van" Keefer (Zazie Beetz) after being kicked out of his parents' house. He is working a dead-end job signing passengers up for credit cards at Hartsfield–Jackson Atlanta International Airport when he learns his cousin Alfred had released a new mixtape under the rap name "Paper Boi." Earn visits Alfred, and offers to act as his manager. Alfred initially sees Earn as a leech, noting that he hadn't spoken to him since the funeral of Alfred's mother and questioning his financial incentive. Earn attempts to prove himself by going to a local radio station and bribing the DJ to play Paper Boi's song. Later, just as they listen to the song on Alfred's car radio, a man walking by suddenly snaps off one of the side-view mirrors, resulting in the incident at the opening scene which ultimately culminates with a shootout. Earn and Alfred are promptly arrested, while Darius escapes the scene.

== Production ==
In 2013, Deadline announced that Donald Glover would be developing a new series about Atlanta for FX. In 2014, FX ordered a pilot for the series.

"The Big Bang" was filmed in July 2015 at various locations around the Atlanta metropolitan area. Airport scenes set at Hartsfield-Jackson International Airport were actually filmed at Infinite Energy Arena in Duluth, Georgia.

== Reception ==
The episode received mainly positive reviews from critics. IGN called the episode "a comedic slow burn" while Indiewire stated that the series was "on the cusp of something great".

The pilot was viewed by 1.08 million viewers during its premiere and earned an 18-49 rating of 0.5.

After submitting "The Big Bang" to Emmy voters for consideration, Glover won the Primetime Emmy Award for Outstanding Lead Actor in a Comedy Series on September 17, 2017; this made him the first black man to win the award since Robert Guillaume in 1985.
