= Ned Benson =

American filmmaker

- Born: April 3, 1977 (age 49); New York City, New York, U.S.
- Education: Columbia University
- Occupations: Screenwriter; film director; film producer

Ned Benson (born April 3, 1977) is an American filmmaker.

== Early life ==
Benson was born in New York City, New York, U.S. He attended Deerfield Academy and graduated from Columbia University in 2001.

== Career ==
After working on The Westerner, Benson made his directorial debut film The Disappearance of Eleanor Rigby. After Chastain asked questions about the background, Benson wrote another script devoted entirely to her perspective and she joined the cast. It was shot as two films simultaneously. They were premiered at the 2013 Toronto International Film Festival under the title The Disappearance of Eleanor Rigby: Him and Her Benson later edited the films into one film The Disappearance of Eleanor Rigby: Them which premiered at the 2014 Cannes Film Festival. The Weinstein Company had a limited release in September 2014. On January 16, 2019, Benson and Jac Schaeffer served as story writers for Black Widow. He was later replaced by Eric Pearson.

== Personal life ==
Benson had a long-term relationship with Jessica Chastain, but they broke up in 2010.

== Filmography ==
Short film

Year	Title	Director	Writer	Producer
2003	Four Lean Hounds	Yes	Yes	Yes
2010	The Westerner	Yes	Yes	No
2010	Yes	Yes	Yes	Yes

Feature film

Year	Title	Director	Writer	Producer
2014	The Disappearance of Eleanor Rigby	Yes	Yes	Yes
2021	Black Widow	No	Story	No
2024	The Greatest Hits	Yes	Yes	Yes
TBA	Monsanto	No	Yes	No
