= The Greatest Hits (film) =

2024 American film by Ned Benson

- Release poster
- Directed by: Ned Benson
- Written by: Ned Benson
- Produced by: Michael London; Shannon Gaulding; Stephanie Davis; Cassandra Kulukundis; Ned Benson
- Starring: Lucy Boynton; Justin H. Min; David Corenswet; Austin Crute
- Cinematography: Chung-hoon Chung
- Edited by: Saira Haider
- Music by: Ryan Lott
- Production companies: Groundswell Productions; Flying Point Productions
- Distributed by: Searchlight Pictures
- Release dates: March 14, 2024 (SXSW); April 5, 2024 (United States); April 12, 2024 (Hulu)
- Running time: 95 minutes
- Country: United States
- Language: English

The Greatest Hits is a 2024 American romantic fantasy film written, produced and directed by Ned Benson, and starring Lucy Boynton, Justin H. Min, David Corenswet, and Austin Crute. It follows Harriet (Boynton) who, mourning her boyfriend, travels back in time when she listens to a particular song associated with him.

Searchlight Pictures announced the film in August 2022, with principal photography commencing at the end of the month and continued till October. Much of the film was shot predominantly in Los Angeles by cinematographer Chung-hoon Chung. During post-production, the musical score was composed by Ryan Lott and editing was completed by Saira Haider.

The Greatest Hits had its world premiere at South by Southwest on March 14, 2024 and had a limited theatrical release on April 5, 2024, followed by a worldwide premiere as a Hulu original film on April 12, 2024. The film received mixed reviews from critics.

== Plot ==
Harriet is mourning her boyfriend, Max, who died two years earlier in a car crash. An unusual happenstance complicates her emotional recovery: whenever she hears songs associated with him, she travels back in time to that moment.

In the present, these episodes manifest as seizures, and to keep herself from inadvertently traveling, Harriet wears noise-canceling headphones when out in public. She tries multiple times to save Max's life. During one of her trips, Harriet asks Max if he would save her life if it meant they would never meet. During another trip Harriet travels back to the moment she and Max first met: a concert where she impulsively followed him into the crowd after striking up a conversation.

In her grief support group, Harriet meets David Park. He is grieving his recently deceased parents and trying to keep their antiques business afloat. Harriet invites him to a DJ session with her friend Morris, the only one who knows about her time travel. When she and David hit it off, Morris suggests she try to move beyond Max.

In the present, she rebuffs David's questions about the headphones. They attend several functions together and grow closer, but when they try to make out, Harriet hears one of her triggering songs and breaks it off. She later comes clean to David about what is happening to her, but he doesn't believe in her theory, calling her trips hallucinations.

David finally takes Harriet to his parents' antique shop. She realizes that she's been there before, with Max. She uses one of the songs to travel back in time and leaves a message there for David. He finds the message and realizes that Harriet can travel in time. He asks if she can save his parents, but she states she can only affect her own decisions and not those of others.

Harriet finally has confidence that she can change the past, but she also realizes she loves David and they would never have met if Max hadn't died. The two of them discuss what to do, with David telling her that he would save his parents if he had the chance. Harriet travels back in time and asks Max if he would choose never to meet her if it would prevent her death. As he says yes, she returns to the current time and shares a moment with David before going back to the concert the day she met Max. Max invites her to follow him, and unlike on the day they met, she declines, sparing him an early, tragic death.

In the new present, Harriet is happy and no longer needs the headphones. At a coffee shop, Max walks past her, arm in arm with another woman. He and Harriet don't notice each other. She and Morris attend a concert, and David and his sister are also attending. Harriet and David catch each other's eye.

== Cast ==
- Lucy Boynton as Harriet Gibbons
- Justin H. Min as David Park, Harriet's new love interest
- David Corenswet as Max Enders, Harriet's deceased boyfriend
- Austin Crute as Morris Martin, Harriet's friend
- Retta as Dr. Evelyn Bartlett, Harriet's grief counselor
- Andie Ju as Edie Park, David's sister
- Nelly Furtado as herself
- Clementine Creevy as Samantha
- Alyssa Hunter as Sebastián

== Production ==
=== Development ===
"I’m obsessed with music and what it does to me and how it sort of forms nostalgia. So many songs and so much music just transports me back to the past and sort of helps remind me to live my life too, so I wanted to write a movie about that."

— Ned Benson

The Greatest Hits was written, produced and directed by Ned Benson. It was also produced by Groundswell Productions' Michael London and Shannon Gaulding, along with Stephanie Davis, Cassandra Kulukundis. The film marked Benson's return to directing after a decade, since The Disappearance of Eleanor Rigby (2013).

In 2008, Benson read the non-fiction book Musicophilia (2007) by author Oliver Sacks which results on how music interacts with the brain and The Rest Is Noise by the music critic Alex Ross. The two books led him to develop the genesis and story idea for the film, which he attributed to his emotional susceptibility to music that served as the time travel mechanism for his life. During the COVID-19 pandemic, Benson revisited the script through the musical lens.

Benson further described the film as a "love letter to Los Angeles" where the film was set and shot; the filmography of Cameron Crowe, John Hughes, Richard Linklater and the films Reality Bites (1994) and Like Crazy (2011) served as inspirations for the film. While the initial draft had specific needle drops tied to his musical selections, he wanted the story to come to life with the cast. This resulted him to rewrite the script multiple times, including the dialogues owing to the casting process.

=== Casting ===
In August 2022, Lucy Boynton was cast as Harriet Gibbons, the film's protagonist. She eventually took on the role after opting out of starring in a proposed biopic on British singer Marianne Faithfull. Benson described Boynton as an "extraordinary actor in everything that she does, and she’s also just a lovely human being" which felt it suited for Gibbons' role. Later, the same month, Justin H. Min was cast as David Park. David Corenswet participated in the film's production on October. In October 2022, Austin Crute was added to the cast.

=== Filming ===
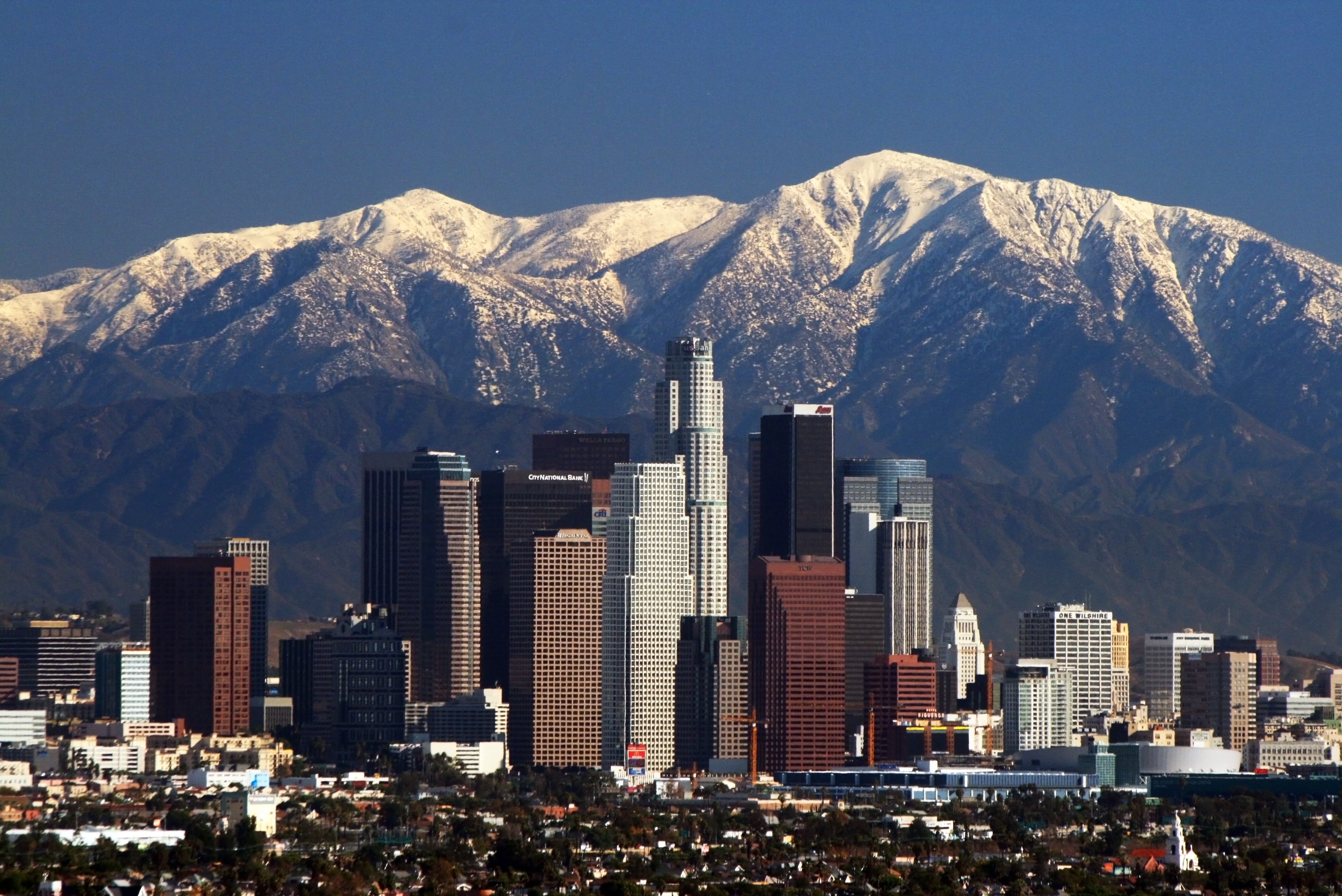
The film was shot predominantly in Los Angeles, California.

Principal photography took place on location in Los Angeles, California from late August to October 2022, particularly in the locations of: Downtown, Echo Park, Silver Lake, Chinatown, Boyle Heights, Highland Park, Venice Beach and Agua Dulce. The film was shot in 36 locations in the city.

== Release ==
In August 2022, Searchlight Pictures acquired the rights to The Greatest Hits. The film had its world premiere at South by Southwest on March 14, 2024, and released in select theatres on April 5, 2024, followed by a streaming release on Hulu in the United States on April 12, 2024.

== Reception ==
=== Audience viewership ===
According to the streaming aggregator JustWatch, The Greatest Hits was most streamed film across all platforms in the United States from April 15 to April 21, 2024, and overall the fourth most streamed from April 1 to April 30, 2024.

=== Critical response ===
On the review aggregator website Rotten Tomatoes, 49% of 85 critics' reviews are positive, with an average rating of 5.8/10. The website's consensus reads: "The Greatest Hits is built around a genuinely interesting idea, but it's lost in a shallow treatment that's too often content to rely on sentimentality." Metacritic, which uses a weighted average, assigned the film a score of 50 out of 100, based on 15 critics, indicating "mixed or average" reviews.

Valerie Complex of Deadline Hollywood wrote "The film’s exploration of music’s role in our emotional lives and history is a moving portrayal that offers audiences a reflective journey through the intricacies of love, loss and, ultimately, hope." Coleman Spilde of The Daily Beast wrote "The film celebrates these types of adoration without exalting them, and the diffident types of audiophiles who move about Harriet’s universe charm their way into a viewer’s heart. That resonance is so supremely critical to a time travel film. This genre hinges on forging an emotional connection to its audience. That relationship is what makes trekking through space and time a necessary experimentation with fate, and not an exhausting record that’s stuck on repeat." Kate Erbland of IndieWire called it as "a wistful charmer about the price of nostalgia".

Peter DeBruge of Variety wrote "This is a love story; it’s not meant to be logical. Still, such a premise lives or dies by its execution, and apart from the pretty pixie flares that swarm the screen each time Harriet is about to sonic-zoom, The Greatest Hits feels like the remainder-bin version of better love stories." Alissa Wilkinson of The New York Times praised the performances and music choices but felt that the film lacks the "imagination of [The Disappearance of] Eleanor Rigby" and the "lightness and humor of a rom-com, which might balance out all the dreary moments and make it feel more watchable."

Caryn James of The Hollywood Reporter wrote "The Greatest Hits is the kind of film that should sweep you away with its charm and emotion. Instead, it’s too transparently button-pushing to go beyond the stale tropes of the weepy drama." Alex Maidy of JoBlo.com wrote "The Greatest Hits was almost a good movie if it could have plumbed the depths of these characters a bit more. Instead, it is a forgettable romance with one of the best soundtracks in recent memory."

Benjamin Lee gave the film two out of five stars in The Guardian, calling the film "[an] often insufferably cutesy romance." Ty Burr of The Washington Post assigned one-and-a-half out of five stars saying "A time-travel romance falls victim to generic characters and clunky dialogue".

Chase Hutchinson of TheWrap wrote "The Greatest Hits is a fitting title as there are plenty of familiar beats that may ensure it achieves broad popularity, but it never finds anything remotely close to genuine emotional potency [...] Like a superficial pop radio hit that gets played over and over, the only grace it finds is the potential that it will fade from your memory as soon as you finish watching it." Marjorie Baumgarteon of The Austin Chronicle wrote "with a narrative premise that requires the suspension of disbelief, The Greatest Hits stands on less sturdy ground, even though it is irrepressibly romantic."
