= They/Them (film) =

2022 American film by John Logan

- Release poster
- Directed by: John Logan
- Written by: John Logan
- Produced by: Jason Blum; Michael Aguilar
- Starring: Theo Germaine; Carrie Preston; Anna Chlumsky; Austin Crute; Quei Tann; Anna Lore; Cooper Koch; Monique Kim; Darwin del Fabro; Hayley Griffith; Boone Platt; Mark Ashworth; Kevin Bacon
- Cinematography: Lyn Moncrief
- Edited by: Tad Dennis
- Music by: Drum & Lace
- Production company: Blumhouse Productions
- Distributed by: Peacock
- Release dates: July 24, 2022 (Outfest); August 5, 2022 (United States)
- Running time: 104 minutes
- Country: United States
- Language: English

They/Them (pronounced "they-slash-them") is a 2022 American slasher film written and directed by John Logan, in his feature directorial debut, and produced by Jason Blum through his Blumhouse Productions banner. It stars Theo Germaine, Carrie Preston, Anna Chlumsky, Austin Crute, Quei Tann, Anna Lore, Cooper Koch, Monique Kim, Darwin del Fabro, Hayley Griffith, Boone Platt, Mark Ashworth, and Kevin Bacon, and follows a group of LGBTQ teens and a masked killer at a conversion camp.

The film was premiered at the Outfest film festival on July 24, 2022, and was released via streaming on Peacock on August 5, 2022. It received mixed reviews from critics.

== Plot ==
At night, a mysterious figure kills a person driving to a conversion camp known as Whistler Camp. In the morning, a group of LGBTQ youth arrive at Whistler Camp, run by Owen Whistler. He introduces the camp as an inclusive safe space and promises that they will not try to forcibly convert them. Owen separates the campers into cabins for boys and girls, but Jordan, who is non-binary, is not comfortable going to either. Owen assigns Jordan to the boys' cabin. The group comes together in a circle and shares why they came to Whistler Camp. Jordan says they made a deal with their religious family to attend for a week so they could legally emancipate themself. The next morning, Owen criticizes and outs another member, Alexandra, for not sharing that she is trans. He makes her go to the boys' cabin for dishonesty. Alexandra later convinces the camp's new nurse, Molly, to give her estradiol, an estrogen hormone.

The group partakes in activities overseen by former member and athletics director Zane and his fiancée, activities director Sarah. One night, Owen splits the group into pairs, handcuffing them together, and instructs them to walk into the woods alone. The group is hesitant, but Owen promises that they will regroup in the morning. Jordan and Alexandra see a mysterious person in the woods. The next day, the camp's therapist, Dr. Cora Whistler, belittles members of the group for their sexualities and gender identities, including Jordan. Affected by Dr. Cora's words, Jordan returns to the boys' cabin upset, but is cheered up when the group hosts a dance party to "Perfect" by Pink. That night, Jordan sneaks into the main office and discovers photographs that show the history of Whistler Camp, including the torturing of children. Jordan is caught by Molly, who says she did not know and promises to protect the group. The camp's groundskeeper, Balthazar, is killed by the mysterious figure while observing the girls showering through a spy cam.

The next day, the group is divided by gender. Owen takes the boys to a shooting range while the girls make pies for the boys. Jordan defeats Zane in a shooting competition. Owen reverts to calling Jordan "he" instead of "they". Owen instructs Toby, a gay man, to shoot Owen's dog, Duke, because Duke has cancer. If he refuses to do so, Zane will start to torture Duke by breaking the dog's legs. Jordan kills Duke instead and storms off. Jordan, Alexandra, and Toby agree to leave Whistler Camp in the morning. Gabriel seduces Stu and they have sex before Gabriel calls Owen and Zane, revealing he secretly works for Whistler Camp. They punish Stu with aversion therapy, a form of electroshock torture that Owen says will make Stu heterosexual. Upon finding Stu unconscious, Molly quits and says she will go to the police. Owen threatens her to stay. The mysterious figure butchers Zane and Sarah and fatally electrocutes Gabriel.

Every person at Whistler Camp comes together after finding the dead bodies. The murderer kills Cora. Alexandra leads the younger members out of the camp. The murderer reveals herself to be Molly. Her real name is Angie Phelps. She murdered the real Molly to take her place as the camp nurse. Angie attended Whistler Camp and was tortured there by Owen. She made it her mission to close every conversion camp in existence by killing the complicit employees. Angie attacks Owen but is unable to gain the upper hand. Jordan takes Owen's gun but does not shoot, giving Angie the opportunity to kill Owen herself. Angie tries talking Jordan into helping her, but Jordan refuses. The police arrest Angie. The group agrees to live their lives to the fullest.

== Cast ==
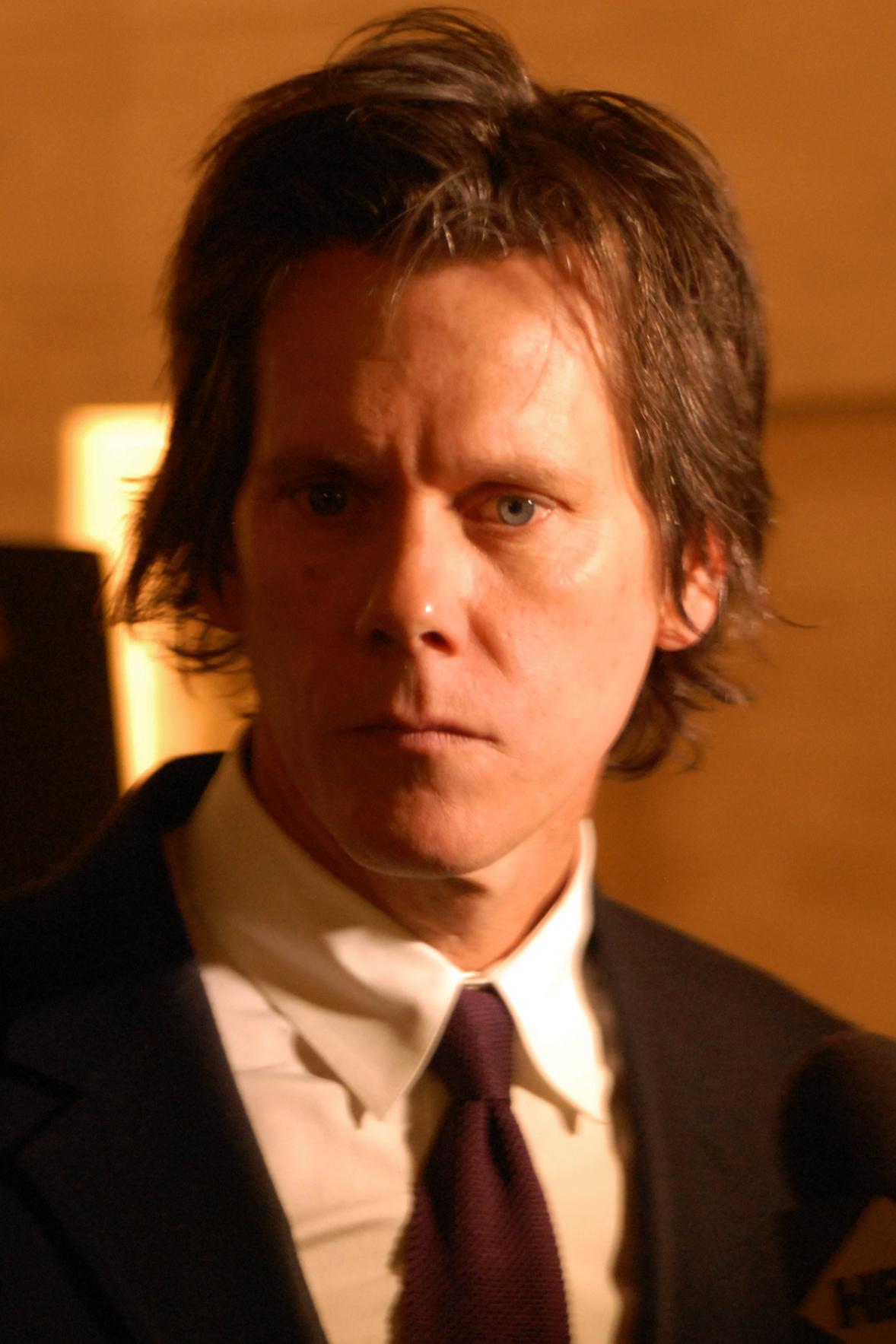
Kevin Bacon stars as Owen Whistler, and also acted as an executive producer on the film.

- Kevin Bacon as Owen Whistler
- Theo Germaine as Jordan Lewis
- Anna Chlumsky as Molly Erickson / Angie Phelps
- Carrie Preston as Dr. Cora Whistler
- Quei Tann as Alexandra Traven
- Austin Crute as Toby O'Neal
- Anna Lore as Kim Hartman
- Monique Kim as Veronica Lim
- Cooper Koch as Stuart Smith Williams
- Darwin Del Fabro as Gabriel Hernandez
- Hayley Griffith as Sarah Kahan
- Boone Platt as Zane Whistler
- Mark Ashworth as Balthazar Riggs

== Production ==
On April 9, 2021, it was announced John Logan would write and direct the horror film Whistler Camp in his feature directorial debut, with Jason Blum and Michael Aguilar attached as producers for Blumhouse Productions. In September 2021, the film became untitled and it was reported that Theo Germaine, Kevin Bacon, Carrie Preston, and Anna Chlumsky had joined the cast; Bacon and Scott Turner Schofield executive produce. Principal photography with cinematographer Lyn Moncrief began in Atlanta at Camp Rutledge on September 13, 2021, under the working title Rejoice. On October 1, it was announced that the film would premiere on Peacock and that Quei Tann, Austin Crute, Anna Lore, Monique Kim, Cooper Koch, and Darwin del Fabro would also star. Blum said he was drawn to making a feature film about conversion therapy following the release of the documentary Pray Away. He also clarified that the idea for the film was conceived entirely by Logan, who wrote it on spec.

== Release ==
The film premiered at the Outfest film festival on July 24, 2022. It premiered on Peacock on August 5, 2022.

It was released as a digital release by Universal Pictures in the United Kingdom in December 2022.

== Reception ==
On the review aggregator website Rotten Tomatoes, 34% of 71 critics' reviews are positive, with an average rating of 4.9/10. The website's consensus reads: "Although it deserves credit for its strong cast and inclusive premise, They/Them is too tonally messy to cut more than skin deep." Metacritic, which uses a weighted average, assigned the film a score of 46 out of 100, based on 19 critics, indicating "mixed or average" reviews.

Writing for the New York Times, Calum Marsh said: "Logan, who also wrote the screenplay, feels so averse to engaging with the thorny political implications inherent in this material—of having to negotiate a cast of gay, transgender and nonbinary characters in a horror context—that the whole thing winds up seeming rather tame." Peter Debruge of Variety wrote: "It's so committed to affirmational messages about queer identity not being a choice, a condition or a legitimate motive to get axed by a deranged serial killer that the movie all but forgets to be scary—although enlisting Kevin Bacon as too-genial-to-be-trusted camp overseer Owen Whistler nearly makes it work."

Richard Roeper of the Chicago Sun-Times gave the film 3 out of 4 stars, saying: "As a director, Logan knows how to put us through the horror genre paces, from jump scares and mysterious sounds in the woods, to the obligatory gruesome kills. Time and again, though, we're reminded that real monster in They/Them is bigotry and intolerance."
