= Austin Crute =

American actor

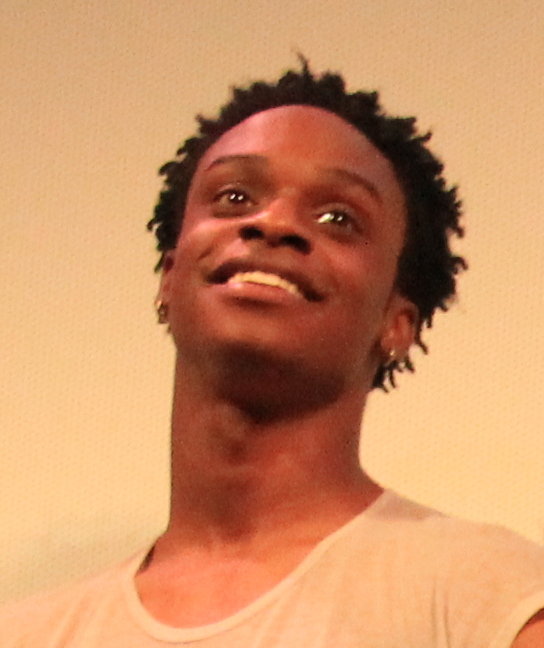
Crute in 2019

Austin Crute (born October 24, 1995) is an American actor best known for his roles in the Netflix series Daybreak and the films Booksmart and They/Them.

== Biography ==
Crute was born into a religious family, the son of a pastor in Marietta, Georgia. In 2011–2012, at age 15, Crute appeared as a contestant on the reality competition Majors & Minors and subsequently, the musical album which arose out of the show. He graduated high school from Greater Atlanta Christian School in 2014. He graduated from New York University in 2018. He portrayed Alan in the 2019 coming of age film Booksmart, Olivia Wilde's directorial debut and Wesley Fists in the post-apocalyptic Netflix series Daybreak. He previously had a guest appearance as "Black Justin Bieber" in an episode of the FX series Atlanta.

Crute is gay, and played LGBTQ characters in Booksmart, Daybreak, They/Them and The Greatest Hits.

As a recording artist, Crute has released the track "Ungodly".

== Filmography ==
=== Film ===
Year	Title	Role	Notes
2019	Booksmart	Alan	
2022	Honk for Jesus. Save Your Soul.	Khalil	
2022	Tankhouse	Jack	
2022	They/Them	Toby	
2024	The Greatest Hits	Morris Martin	Film

=== Television ===
Year	Title	Role	Notes
2016	Atlanta	Justin Bieber	Episode: "Nobody Beats the Biebs"
2018	Orange Is the New Black	Lamar	Episode: "Sh*tstorm Coming"
2019	Daybreak	Wesley Fists	Main role
2020	Trinkets	Marquise	3 episodes
2021	Call Your Mother	Lane	Main role
