= Stephen Glover (screenwriter) =

American rapper and screenwriter (born 1988)

- Born: Stephen Antuan Glover; June 18, 1988 (age 38); Atlanta, Georgia, U.S.
- Other name: Steve G. Lover III
- Occupations: Screenwriter; rapper; actor; producer
- Relatives: Donald Glover (brother)

External image
- Glover at an event for The 69th Primetime Emmy Awards in 2017

Stephen Antuan Glover (born June 18, 1988) is an American screenwriter, rapper, actor, and producer. He is known for his work as the head story editor and one of the writers for the FX comedy-drama Atlanta. He frequently collaborates with his older brother Donald Glover, who plays the lead character in Atlanta and co-stars in Guava Island, also written by Stephen.

== Career ==
=== Atlanta ===
Donald Glover hired Stephen, his younger brother, to co-write for Atlanta, despite Stephen having no prior professional experience in writing for television. He did this to satisfy his desire to have an all-black writing team for the show (something that Vulture noted is completely new for the industry), made up mostly of Atlanta citizens, to achieve an accurate portrayal. Publications such as GQ and The Daily Beast have noted that as the lead writer for four episodes in Atlanta's first season, Glover's personal experience and his first-hand perspective on black culture in the city of Atlanta is evident within the show's writing, and they have praised this creative approach as being new and fresh for television.

Glover's musical background has also played a substantial role in the creation of one of Atlanta's main characters played by Brian Tyree Henry, aspiring rapper Alfred Miles who assumes the rap alias of Paper Boi. In an interview with The Fader, Glover discusses how in the event that Henry could not rap well, the writing staff did not want to force him to rap as his character, and so Glover's brother requested that he instead provide the rapped vocals for the character's song "Paper Boi" that is featured throughout the pilot episode. The instrumental of the song was a beat inspired by Atlanta trap rap production that was made by music producer Chemist, whom Glover considers his go-to producer for his own music outside of Atlanta.

Although his writing has received praise from various outlets for its creativity, experimentation, and humor based in reality, Glover's writing has also provoked minor controversy. The fifth episode of Atlanta, "Nobody Beats the Biebs", for which Glover was the lead writer, features a fictional depiction of the pop star Justin Bieber being portrayed in an exaggerated and negative light, by a black actor, Austin Crute, rather than a white actor. Writing for Slate, journalist Aisha Harris accused Glover of being "coy" while explaining his reasoning for this creative decision in an interview with Vulture, noting his reluctance to comment on the matter in more detail.

=== Music ===
GQ describes Glover's music as being more influenced by the grittier and harder elements of Atlanta trap music in comparison to his brother's R&B and indie-inspired work in hip hop under the alias Childish Gambino. In the same GQ interview, fellow Atlanta writer Swank jokingly said that Glover's mother does not understand why his music differs so drastically from that of his brother's. Glover has been featured as a guest rapper under the name Steve G. Lover on every Childish Gambino outing since Gambino's 2012 mixtape Royalty. Glover's first feature on a mainstream studio album was Childish Gambino's 2013 album Because the Internet, and his most recent appearance, apart from his own releases, was on the 2014 Kauai EP, also by his brother.

Glover has stated that he has been making music since the age of 17. His 2011 mixtape Frequent Flyer LP features production from Chemist and Alias Amazin. This was followed by Summer of Steve released in 2012 and featuring production from solely Chemist. The most recent 2016 album, DJ Rhetorik Presents: Rich Black American, features a variety of guests including his brother.

== Discography ==
=== Mixtapes ===
- Frequent Flyer LP (2011)
- Summer of Steve (2012)
- High Art (2014)
- DJ Rhetorik Presents: Rich Black American (2016)

== Filmography ==
=== Film ===
Year	Title	Director	Writer	Executive producer	Notes
2019	Guava Island	No	Yes	Yes	
2023	House Party	No	Yes	No	

=== Television ===
Year	Title	Director	Writer	Executive producer	Notes
2016–22	Atlanta	No	Yes	Yes	Wrote 11 episodes Story editor for 7 episodes and showrunner
2018	Saturday Night Live	No	Yes	No	Episode: "Donald Glover/Childish Gambino"
2023	Swarm	Yes	Yes	Yes	Wrote episode "Running Scared"; Wrote and directed episode "Fallin' Through the Cracks"; Played Caché in episode "Taste"
2024	Mr. & Mrs. Smith	No	Yes	Yes	Glover wrote the episode "Do You Want Kids?"

=== Music videos ===
- Childish Gambino: "Heartbeat" (2011)

== Awards and nominations ==
Year	Award	Category	Work	Result	Ref.
2016	Writers Guild of America Awards	Comedy Series	Atlanta	Won	
2016	Writers Guild of America Awards	New Series	Atlanta	Won	
2016	Writers Guild of America Awards	Episodic Comedy (for Episode: "Streets on Lock")	Atlanta	Nominated	
2017	Primetime Emmy Awards	Outstanding Writing for a Comedy Series (for Episode: "Streets on Lock")	Atlanta	Nominated	
2018	Primetime Emmy Awards	Outstanding Comedy Series	Atlanta	Nominated	
2018	Primetime Emmy Awards	Outstanding Writing for a Variety, Music or Comedy Program	Saturday Night Live	Nominated	
