= Hiro Murai =

Japanese filmmaker (born 1983)

- Born: July 15, 1983 (age 43); Tokyo, Japan
- Education: University of Southern California
- Occupation: Filmmaker
- Years active: 2005–present
- Website: hiromurai.com

Hiro Murai (born July 15, 1983) is a Japanese American filmmaker based in Los Angeles. He is best-known for music videos for Childish Gambino, Earl Sweatshirt, Chet Faker and others. His music video and television work has received widespread acclaim, and garnered him three Primetime Emmy Awards (for his work as an executive producer on the Hulu series The Bear and for executive producing and directing the Apple TV series Widow's Bay) and a Grammy Award (for his work on "This Is America").

He rose to prominence with his work on the FX series Atlanta (2016–2022), created by and starring frequent collaborator Donald Glover, on which he served as a director and producer. For his work on the series, he received four Primetime Emmy Award nominations. He would also serve as a director on four episodes on the HBO comedy-drama series Barry (2018–2023), and as a director and executive producer on the HBO limited series Station Eleven (2021–2022), the latter of which also garnered him a further Primetime Emmy Award nomination. He directed five episodes of the 2026 horror comedy drama series Widow's Bay, starring Matthew Rhys.

== Early life and education ==
Hiro Murai was born in 1983 to Japanese popular music composer Kunihiko Murai. He moved to Los Angeles, California, when he was nine years old. He graduated with a degree from the USC School of Cinematic Arts.

== Career ==
After graduation, Murai turned to freelance work as the director of photography for numerous music videos, as well as VFX and storyboarding, most notably for Ace Norton. He has directed music videos for Childish Gambino, Earl Sweatshirt, Chet Faker, and others.

In 2013, he directed the short film Clapping for the Wrong Reasons, a companion piece for Childish Gambino's second studio album, Because the Internet, and its attached screenplay. In the same year, he created a multi-panel video set for Frank Ocean's performance at the Grammys.

Murai directed several episodes of the comedy-drama Atlanta, collaborating again with Donald Glover (aka Childish Gambino). For his work on the show, he has received three nominations for the Emmy Award for Outstanding Comedy Series and Outstanding Directing for a Comedy Series.

In 2016, he directed a Nike campaign starring Chance The Rapper.

He directed the music video for Childish Gambino's "This Is America", released on May 5, 2018, which was described as "the most talked-about music video of recent memory", and which Billboard critics ranked 10th among the "greatest music videos of the 21st century." In 2019, Murai won the Grammy Award for Best Music Video for directing the video.

In June 2018, it was announced that he would direct a science fiction feature film, Man Alive, written by David Robert Mitchell.

In November 2018, the trailer for his debut feature film Guava Island, starring Donald Glover and Rihanna, premiered at the Pharos Festival in New Zealand. Guava Island was released on April 13, 2019, by Amazon Studios through Amazon Prime Video. On Rotten Tomatoes, the film has an approval rating of 74% based on reviews from 43 critics, with an average rating of 6.60/10. On Metacritic, it has a weighted average score of 64 out of 100, based on 8 reviews, indicating "generally favorable" reviews.

In 2021, Murai directed the first and third episodes of the science fiction miniseries Station Eleven for HBO Max, which garnered him a Primetime Emmy Award nomination.

Murai directed the first two episodes of the 2024 action comedy drama Mr. & Mrs. Smith, starring Donald Glover and Maya Erskine.

In 2026, he directed five episodes of the horror comedy drama series Widow's Bay. That year, he became the first Asian director to win a Primetime Emmy Award for Outstanding Directing for a Comedy Series, for directing the Widow’s Bay premiere, called “Welcome to Widow’s Bay!”.

In June 2026, it was announced he will direct and executive produce the television adaptation of Jeffrey Eugenides' book The Marriage Plot.

== Filmography ==
Short film

- Clapping for the Wrong Reasons (2013)

Feature film

- Guava Island (2019)

=== Television ===
Year	Title	Director	Executive producer	Notes	Ref.
2016–2022	Atlanta	Yes	Yes	Directed 26 episodes	
2017	Legion	Yes	No	Episode "Chapter 6"	
2017	Sea Oak	Yes	Yes	TV pilot	
2017	Snowfall	Yes	No	Episode "Trauma"	
2018–2019	Barry	Yes	No	4 episodes	
2021–2022	Station Eleven	Yes	Yes	2 episodes	
2022	The Bear	No	Yes		
2024	Mr. & Mrs. Smith	Yes	Yes	2 episodes	
2026	Widow's Bay	Yes	Yes	6 episodes	
TBA	The Marriage Plot	Yes	Yes	miniseries	

=== Music video ===
Director

Year	Title	Artist	Notes	Ref.
2005	"Small Apartment Party Epiphany"	Make Believe	Co-directed with Steve Drypolcher and Brandon Driscoll-Luttringer	
2009	"Signs (Armand Van Helden Remix)"	Bloc Party		
2009	"Me-Time"	Busdriver		
2009	"Heartless"	The Fray		
2009	"Unbalanced Pieces"	Soulsavers		
2009	"Staying In Love"	Raphael Saadiq		
2010	"Airplanes"	B.o.B featuring Hayley Williams		
2010	"DJ Got Us Fallin' in Love"	Usher featuring Pitbull		
2010	"The Show Goes On"	Lupe Fiasco		
2011	"Stereo Hearts"	Gym Class Heroes featuring Adam Levine		
2012	"Shady Love"	Scissor Sisters vs. Krystal Pepsy		
2012	"Mind Control"	Friends		
2012	"It's Only Life"	The Shins		
2012	"She Wolf (Falling to Pieces)"	David Guetta featuring Sia		
2012	"Chum"	Earl Sweatshirt		
2012	"Cheerleader"	St. Vincent		
2013	"Hive"	Earl Sweatshirt		
2013	"High Road"	Cults		
2013	"3005"	Childish Gambino		
2014	"Smooth Sailing"	Queens of the Stone Age		
2014	"Sweatpants"	Childish Gambino		
2014	"Do You"	Spoon		
2014	"Gold"	Chet Faker		
2014	"#CAKE"	Shabazz Palaces		
2014	"Never Catch Me"	Flying Lotus		
2014	"Telegraph Ave"	Childish Gambino		
2015	"Sober"	Childish Gambino		
2015	"Grief"	Earl Sweatshirt		
2016	"Take It There"	Massive Attack		
2016	"Day Ones"	Baauer		
2016	"Black Man in a White World"	Michael Kiwanuka		
2017	"Dis Generation"	A Tribe Called Quest		
2018	"This Is America"	Childish Gambino		
2020	"sad day"	FKA Twigs		
2024	"Little Foot Big Foot"	Childish Gambino		

Director of photography

Year	Title	Artist
2006	"Crooked Teeth"	Death Cab for Cutie
2006	"Someday You Will Be Loved"	Death Cab for Cutie
2006	"Cobrastyle"	Teddybears
2007	"Living a Lie"	Aqueduct
2009	"Submarine Symphonika"	The Submarines

== Awards and nominations ==
- (2009) MVPA Award for Best Video under $25K. The Fray "Heartless"
- (2012) Best Music Video Lists: Pitchfork / BuzzFeed / Consequence of Sound / Video Static / Co.Create / NPR Music - for St. Vincent "Cheerleader" and Earl Sweatshirt "Chum"
- (2013) MVPA Best Electronic Video: David Guetta - "She Wolf"
- (2014) UKMVA Director of the Year / Best Rock / Indie Video International QOTSA for Smooth Sailing.
- (2014) Best Music Videos Lists: The Verge, Pitchfork, IMVDB, Stereogum

Organizations	Year	Category	Work	Result	Ref.
BAFTA TV Awards	2023	Best International Programme	The Bear	Nominated	
Directors Guild of America Awards	2018	Outstanding Directing – Comedy Series	Atlanta (episode: "Teddy Perkins")	Nominated	
Directors Guild of America Awards	2021	Outstanding Directing – Miniseries or TV Film	Station Eleven (episode: "Wheel of Time")	Nominated	
Gotham Awards	2022	Breakthrough Series	Station Eleven	Nominated	
Gotham Awards	2023	Breakthrough Series	Mr. & Mr. Smith	Won	
Grammy Awards	2019	Best Music Video	"This Is America", Childish Gambino	Won	
Hollywood Critics Association TV Awards	2022	Best Directing for a Limited Series or Movie	Station Eleven (episode: "Wheel of Fire")	Nominated	
Hollywood Critics Association TV Awards	2022	Best Directing for a Comedy Series	Atlanta (episode: "New Jazz")	Nominated	
Independent Spirit Awards	2021	Best New Non-Scripted or Documentary Series	The Choe Show	Nominated	
Independent Spirit Awards	2022	Best New Scripted Series	The Bear	Nominated	
Independent Spirit Awards	2022	Best New Scripted Series	Station Eleven	Nominated	
MTV Video Music Awards	2015	Best Direction	"Sober", Childish Gambino	Nominated	
MTV Video Music Awards	2018	Best Direction	"This Is America", Childish Gambino	Won	
Peabody Award	2016	Entertainment	Atlanta (season one)	Won	
Peabody Award	2024	Entertainment	Atlanta (season four)	Won	
Primetime Emmy Awards	2017	Outstanding Comedy Series	Atlanta (season one)	Nominated	
Primetime Emmy Awards	2018	Outstanding Comedy Series	Atlanta (season two)	Nominated	
Primetime Emmy Awards	2018	Outstanding Directing for a Comedy Series	Atlanta (episode: "Teddy Perkins")	Nominated	
Primetime Emmy Awards	2022	Outstanding Directing for a Comedy Series	Atlanta (episode: "New Jazz")	Nominated	
Primetime Emmy Awards	2022	Outstanding Directing for a Limited Series or Movie	Station Eleven (episode: "Wheel of Fire")	Nominated	
Primetime Emmy Awards	2023	Outstanding Comedy Series	The Bear (season one)	Won	
Primetime Emmy Awards	2024	Outstanding Comedy Series	The Bear (season two)	Nominated	
Primetime Emmy Awards	2024	Outstanding Drama Series	Mr. & Mrs. Smith	Nominated	
Primetime Emmy Awards	2024	Outstanding Directing for a Drama Series	Mr. & Mrs. Smith (episode: "First Date")	Nominated	
Primetime Emmy Awards	2026	Outstanding Comedy Series	Widow's Bay (season one)	Won	
Primetime Emmy Awards	2026	Outstanding Directing for a Comedy Series	Widow's Bay (episode: "Welcome to Widow's Bay")	Won	
Producers Guild of America Awards	2016	Best Episodic Comedy	Atlanta (season 1)	Won	
Producers Guild of America Awards	2018	Best Episodic Comedy	Atlanta (season 2)	Nominated	
Producers Guild of America Awards	2022	Best Episodic Comedy	The Bear (season 1)	Won	
Producers Guild of America Awards	2023	Best Episodic Comedy	The Bear (season 2)	Won	
UK Music Video Awards	2016	Best Director	Himself	Nominated	
