= Atlanta (TV series) =

American surrealist comedy television series

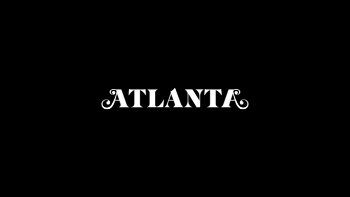
- Also known as: Atlanta: Robbin' Season (season 2)
- Genre: Comedy-drama; Surreal comedy; Black comedy; Satire
- Created by: Donald Glover
- Showrunner: Donald Glover
- Starring: Donald Glover; Brian Tyree Henry; LaKeith Stanfield; Zazie Beetz
- Country of origin: United States
- Original language: English
- No. of seasons: 4
- No. of episodes: 41 (list of episodes)

Production
- Executive producers: Donald Glover; Paul Simms; Dianne McGunigle; Stephen Glover; Hiro Murai
- Production locations: Atlanta; London (season 3); Amsterdam (season 3); Paris (season 3); New York City (season 3)
- Cinematography: Christian Sprenger; Stephen Murphy; Gabriel Patay
- Editors: Isaac Hagy; Kyle Reiter; Ivan Victor; Jen Bryson; Cameron Ross
- Camera setup: Single-camera
- Running time: 22–39 minutes
- Production companies: RBA (seasons 1–2); Gilga (seasons 3–4); 343 Incorporated; MGMT. Entertainment; FXP

Original release
- Network: FX
- Release: September 6, 2016 – November 10, 2022

Atlanta is an American surrealist comedy-drama television series created by Donald Glover for FX. The series follows college dropout and music manager Earnest "Earn" Marks (Glover) and rapper Alfred "Paper Boi" Miles (Brian Tyree Henry) as they navigate a strange, apparently otherworldly Atlanta hip hop scene. Atlanta also stars LaKeith Stanfield as Darius, Earn and Alfred's eccentric friend, and Zazie Beetz as Vanessa "Van" Kiefer, Earn's on-again-off-again girlfriend and the mother of his daughter.

The series was produced by RBA, Gilga, 343 Incorporated, MGMT. Entertainment, and FXP and is primarily set and filmed in Atlanta and the surrounding Georgia area; the third season features international filming locations. Atlanta is one of the few American cable television series to feature an all-Black writing staff (featuring Glover as writer, executive producer and showrunner), with much of the focus set on examining race, class, identity, the American Dream, existentialism, surrealism, and modern African-American culture through an Afro-Surrealist lens. It is also notable for its use of bottle and standalone episodes, which often do not feature the main cast.

Atlanta premiered on September 6, 2016, and was initially exclusively broadcast on cable channel FX in the United States and in other countries through the Fox Networks Group, and was distributed in the United States by Disney–ABC Domestic Television. The fourth and final season concluded on November 10, 2022, with the series containing 41 episodes overall.

Atlanta received widespread critical acclaim and is often considered by multiple publications to be one of the greatest television series of the 21st century and of all time. It has received numerous awards and nominations, including two Peabody Awards, two Golden Globe Awards for Best Television Series – Musical or Comedy; Glover has received the Golden Globe Award for Best Actor – Television Series Musical or Comedy, and two Primetime Emmy Awards, one for Outstanding Lead Actor in a Comedy Series and one Outstanding Directing for a Comedy Series, the latter being the first ever awarded to an African American.

== Premise ==
The series follows Earn (Donald Glover) during his daily life in Atlanta, Georgia, as he tries to redeem himself in the eyes of his ex-girlfriend Van (Zazie Beetz), who is also the mother of his daughter Lottie, as well as his parents and his cousin Alfred (Brian Tyree Henry), who raps under the stage name "Paper Boi". Having dropped out of Princeton University, Earn has no money and no home and consequently alternates between staying with his parents and his ex-girlfriend. Once he realizes that his cousin is on the verge of stardom, he seeks to reconnect with him in order to improve his life and the life of his daughter.

Although there is an overarching story depicting Earn and Paper Boi's struggles as the latter ascends through the hip hop scene, the series has been noted for its lack of emphasis on multi-episode story arcs, instead using a somewhat surrealistic style of episodic storytelling that Glover has likened to short stories, as have some critics.

== Cast and characters ==
=== Main ===
- Donald Glover as Earnest "Earn" Marks – a Princeton dropout turned music manager for his cousin Alfred. Earn is intelligent but cynical and often reckless and initially struggles with homelessness and poverty. He is also in an on-again-off-again relationship with Vanessa, with whom he shares a daughter, Lottie.
  - Glover also portrays Teddy Perkins in the episode of the same name, a mentally disturbed recluse with bleached skin.
  - Glover also portrays Kirkwood Chocolate in the episode "Work Ethic!", a film and television magnate who produces entertainment that exploits black people.
- Brian Tyree Henry as Alfred "Paper Boi" Miles – Earn's cousin and a rapper who exhibits signs of depression and moral dilemma as he navigates his newfound fame.
- LaKeith Stanfield as Darius – Alfred's and Earn's eccentric Nigerian-born friend, who often expresses comments on various aspects of the human condition.
- Zazie Beetz as Vanessa "Van" Kiefer – Earn's on-again-off-again biracial Afro-German girlfriend, Lottie's mother, and former grade-school science teacher. Van often struggles with the pressure of raising her daughter.

=== Recurring ===
- Harold House Moore as Swiff (season 1) – Earn's friend and co-worker
- Khris Davis as Tracy (season 2; guest season 4) – Alfred's recently paroled friend who often clashes with Earn.
- RJ Walker as Clark County (season 2), an egotistical, commercialized rapper that Alfred befriends. Darius and Earn view him as an industry plant.
- Tobias Segal as Earnest Marks (season 3), a white man who shares his name with the show's protagonist. He appears sporadically throughout the season and is implied to be a "white version" of Earn.

The series also features guest appearances by celebrities who portray fictionalized versions of themselves. Offset, Quavo and Takeoff portray Alfred's drug suppliers. Gunna and Jai Paul appear as a guest at Alfred's studio session and a London partygoer, respectively. Lloyd and Jaleel White feature as participants in a charity basketball game. Jane Adams plays an entertainment agent, Michael Vick portrays a quarterback who challenges club-goers to foot races, and Alexander Skarsgård portrays a sexually depraved cannibal. Liam Neeson and Soulja Boy make appearances that reference their 2019 controversial comments and "Crank That" dance, respectively. Brian McKnight, Sinbad and J Wortham appear in a mockumentary while Cree Summer features as a drugstore customer.

== Episodes ==
Season	Episodes	Originally released	
Season	Episodes	First released	Last released
1	10	September 6, 2016	November 1, 2016
2	11	March 1, 2018	May 10, 2018
3	10	March 24, 2022	May 19, 2022
4	10	September 15, 2022	November 10, 2022

== Production ==
FX first began developing the show in August 2013, and then the pilot was ordered to series by FX Networks in December 2014. It was directed by Hiro Murai and shot in Atlanta. It got picked up to series with a ten-episode order in October 2015. Glover, who grew up in Atlanta and also works as a musician, stated that "the city influenced the tone of the show".

The series is also notable for having an all-Black writing staff, which was virtually unheard of in American television. The writers' room consisted of Glover himself, his brother Stephen, and members of Donald's rap collective Royalty including Fam Udeorji (Glover's manager), Ibra Ake (Glover's longtime photographer) and Jamal Olori. Stefani Robinson, a writer for Man Seeking Woman, and Taofik Kolade rounded out the writers' room. During an interview with The New Yorker, Glover stated the characters smoke cannabis because "they have PTSD—every Black person does". The show is shot in 2K resolution, produced and edited by Kyle Reiter and Isaac Hagy, and broadcast on FX in 720p. In January 2017, the series was renewed for a second season; however, FX announced the series would not return until 2018 due to Glover's busy production schedule. Glover revealed that the second season takes inspiration from Tiny Toon Adventures, specifically How I Spent My Vacation.

The series was renewed for a third season in June 2018, which was originally planned for a 2019 premiere, but was delayed due to scheduling conflicts. In August 2019, FX renewed the series for a fourth season and announced that the third and fourth seasons would begin filming in early 2020, with each season consisting of eight episodes. In January 2020, FX announced that the third season's episode count was increased to 10 episodes, and that both seasons were planned to air in 2021—season 3 in January and season 4 later that year. Both seasons were also planned to be shot together and one of the seasons was to be filmed outside the United States. However, production was postponed in March 2020 due to the COVID-19 pandemic.

In September 2020, it was reported that the third season would not be able to make the January 2021 premiere date that was originally planned. Filming for the third and fourth seasons began in early April 2021, in London, with additional filming in Amsterdam and Paris. By August 2021, filming for the third season was completed and production began on the fourth season in Atlanta, and it was confirmed that the third season would premiere in early 2022. The third season premiered with two episodes on March 24, 2022. By February 2022, both seasons three and four had completed filming, and it was announced that the fourth would be the final season.

== Release ==
=== International broadcast ===
The first season was broadcast in the United Kingdom on BBC Two, from May 13, 2018, to June 17, 2018.

=== Home media ===
The Complete First Season was released on DVD in Region 1 on March 6, 2018, and The Complete Second Season (Robbin' Season) was released on DVD on December 17, 2019.

== Reception ==
=== Critical response ===
Critical response of Atlanta
Season	Rotten Tomatoes	Metacritic
1	98% (141 reviews)	90 (37 reviews)
2	98% (212 reviews)	97 (28 reviews)
3	96% (130 reviews)	93 (24 reviews)
4	98% (119 reviews)	82 (10 reviews)

Atlanta has received widespread acclaim from television critics. The review aggregation website Rotten Tomatoes gives the first season an approval rating of 98% based on 141 reviews, with an average rating of 8.6/10. The website's critical consensus reads, "Ambitious and refreshing, Atlanta offers a unique vehicle for star and series creator Donald Glover's eccentric brand of humor—as well as a number of timely, trenchant observations." On Metacritic, the first season has a score of 90 out of 100, based on reviews from 37 critics.

David Wiegand of the San Francisco Chronicle gave it a highly positive review, writing: "The scripts for the four episodes made available to critics are as richly nuanced as anything you'll see on TV or, to be sure, in a movie theater. You will not only know these characters after only one episode, you'll be hooked on them, as well. In so many areas, Atlanta sets the bar exceptionally high." Sonia Saraiya of Variety also praised the series, declaring it a "finished, cinematic, and beautiful production that may be one of the best new shows of the fall".

The second season received further critical acclaim. On Rotten Tomatoes, it has an approval rating of 98%, based on 212 reviews, with an average rating of 9.1/10. The site's critical consensus reads, "Donald Glover continues to subvert expectations with a sophomore season of Atlanta that proves as excellent as it is eccentric." On Metacritic, the second season has a score of 97 out of 100, based on 28 critics.

In 2019, Atlanta was ranked 10th on The Guardian's list of the 100 best TV shows of the 21st century. The Writers Guild Foundation listed the season 1 episode "Streets on Lock" as having one of the best scripts of 2010s film and television, writing, "The story features fully realized supporting players and miscreants, but right when we start laughing, everything takes a sour turn, causing us to reflect on what we're really laughing at".

The third season has a score of 93 out of 100 on Metacritic, based on 24 critics. On Rotten Tomatoes, it has an approval rating of 96%, based on 130 reviews, with an average rating of 8.6/10. The site's critical consensus reads, "Atlanta takes Paper Boi and his entourage out of Georgia, but this inspired third season proves that the more things change, the more they stay weird."

The fourth season has a score of 82 out of 100 on Metacritic, based on 10 critics. On Rotten Tomatoes, it has an approval rating of 98%, based on 119 reviews, with an average rating of 9.0/10. The site's critical consensus reads, "Foregrounding its characters and namesake again after an anthological sojourn in Europe, Atlanta closes out in its sweet spot: funny, insightful, and weird as hell."

Since its release, Atlanta has been often considered to be one of the greatest television series of the 21st century and of all time. (Note: Attributed to multiple sources.)

=== Accolades ===
==== Season 1 ====
Award	Category	Nominees	Result	Ref.
American Film Institute Awards	Top 10 Television Programs	Atlanta	Won	
Critics' Choice Television Awards	Best Comedy Series	Atlanta	Nominated	
Critics' Choice Television Awards	Best Actor in a Comedy Series	Donald Glover	Won	
Directors Guild of America Awards	Outstanding Directorial Achievement for a Comedy Series	Donald Glover (for "B.A.N.")	Nominated	
Golden Globe Awards	Best Television Series – Musical or Comedy	Atlanta	Won	
Golden Globe Awards	Best Actor in a Television Series – Musical or Comedy	Donald Glover	Won	
Gotham Independent Film Awards	Breakthrough Series – Long Form	Atlanta	Won	
MTV Movie & TV Awards	Show of the Year	Atlanta	Nominated	
MTV Movie & TV Awards	Best Actor in a Show	Donald Glover	Nominated	
MTV Movie & TV Awards	Best Duo	Brian Tyree Henry and LaKeith Stanfield	Nominated	
NAACP Image Awards	Outstanding Comedy Series	Atlanta	Nominated	
NAACP Image Awards	Outstanding Actor in a Comedy Series	Donald Glover	Nominated	
NAACP Image Awards	Outstanding Directing in a Comedy Series	Donald Glover	Won	
NAACP Image Awards	Outstanding Writing in a Comedy Series	Donald Glover	Nominated	
Peabody Awards	Area of Excellence	Atlanta	Won	
People's Choice Awards	Favorite Cable TV Comedy	Atlanta	Nominated	
Primetime Emmy Awards	Outstanding Comedy Series	Atlanta	Nominated	
Primetime Emmy Awards	Outstanding Lead Actor in a Comedy Series	Donald Glover (for "The Big Bang")	Won	
Primetime Emmy Awards	Outstanding Directing for a Comedy Series	Donald Glover (for "B.A.N.")	Won	
Primetime Emmy Awards	Outstanding Writing for a Comedy Series	Donald Glover (for "B.A.N.")	Nominated	
Primetime Emmy Awards	Outstanding Writing for a Comedy Series	Stephen Glover (for "Streets on Lock")	Nominated	
Primetime Creative Arts Emmy Awards	Outstanding Casting for a Comedy Series	Alexa L. Fogel, Tara Feldstein Bennett, and Chase Paris	Nominated	
Producers Guild of America Awards	Episodic Television, Comedy	Donald Glover, Dianne McGunigle, Paul Simms, Hiro Murai, and Alex Orr	Won	
Television Critics Association Awards	Program of the Year	Atlanta	Nominated	
Television Critics Association Awards	Outstanding Achievement in Comedy	Atlanta	Won	
Television Critics Association Awards	Outstanding New Program	Atlanta	Nominated	
Television Critics Association Awards	Individual Achievement in Comedy	Donald Glover	Won	
Writers Guild of America Awards	Comedy Series	Donald Glover, Stephen Glover, Stefani Robinson, and Paul Simms	Won	
Writers Guild of America Awards	New Series	Donald Glover, Stephen Glover, Stefani Robinson, and Paul Simms	Won	
Writers Guild of America Awards	Episodic Comedy	Stephen Glover (for "Streets on Lock")	Nominated	

==== Season 2 ====
Award	Category	Nominees	Result	Ref.
American Cinema Editors Awards	Best Edited Comedy Series for Commercial Television	Isaac Hagy (for "Alligator Man")	Nominated	
American Cinema Editors Awards	Best Edited Comedy Series for Commercial Television	Kyle Reiter (for "Teddy Perkins")	Won	
American Film Institute Awards	Top 10 TV Programs of the Year	Atlanta	Won	
Critics' Choice Television Awards	Best Comedy Series	Atlanta	Nominated	
Critics' Choice Television Awards	Best Actor in a Comedy Series	Donald Glover	Nominated	
Golden Globe Awards	Best Actor in a Television Series – Musical or Comedy	Donald Glover	Nominated	
People's Choice Awards	The Comedy TV Star of 2018	Donald Glover	Nominated	
Primetime Emmy Awards	Outstanding Comedy Series	Atlanta	Nominated	
Primetime Emmy Awards	Outstanding Lead Actor in a Comedy Series	Donald Glover (for "Teddy Perkins")	Nominated	
Primetime Emmy Awards	Outstanding Supporting Actor in a Comedy Series	Brian Tyree Henry (for "Woods")	Nominated	
Primetime Emmy Awards	Outstanding Supporting Actress in a Comedy Series	Zazie Beetz (for "Helen")	Nominated	
Primetime Emmy Awards	Outstanding Directing for a Comedy Series	Donald Glover (for "FUBU")	Nominated	
Primetime Emmy Awards	Outstanding Directing for a Comedy Series	Hiro Murai (for "Teddy Perkins")	Nominated	
Primetime Emmy Awards	Outstanding Writing for a Comedy Series	Donald Glover (for "Alligator Man")	Nominated	
Primetime Emmy Awards	Outstanding Writing for a Comedy Series	Stefani Robinson (for "Barbershop")	Nominated	
Primetime Creative Arts Emmy Awards	Outstanding Casting for a Comedy Series	Alexa L. Fogel, Tara Feldstein Bennett, and Chase Paris	Nominated	
Primetime Creative Arts Emmy Awards	Outstanding Cinematography for a Single-Camera Series (Half-Hour)	Christian Sprenger (for "Teddy Perkins")	Won	
Primetime Creative Arts Emmy Awards	Outstanding Guest Actor in a Comedy Series	Katt Williams (for "Alligator Man")	Won	
Primetime Creative Arts Emmy Awards	Outstanding Music Supervision	Jen Malone and Fam Udeorji (for "Alligator Man")	Nominated	
Primetime Creative Arts Emmy Awards	Outstanding Production Design for a Narrative Program (Half-Hour or Less)	Timothy O'Brien, Taylor Mosbey, and Aimee Athnos (for "Teddy Perkins")	Nominated	
Primetime Creative Arts Emmy Awards	Outstanding Single-Camera Picture Editing for a Comedy Series	Isaac Hagy (for "Alligator Man")	Nominated	
Primetime Creative Arts Emmy Awards	Outstanding Single-Camera Picture Editing for a Comedy Series	Kyle Reiter (for "Teddy Perkins")	Nominated	
Primetime Creative Arts Emmy Awards	Outstanding Sound Editing for a Comedy or Drama Series (Half-Hour) and Animation	Trevor Gates, Jason Dotts, David Barbee, Jordan McClain, Tara Blume, and Matt Salib (for "Teddy Perkins")	Won	
Satellite Awards	Best Comedy Series	Atlanta	Nominated	
Satellite Awards	Best Actor in a Comedy Series	Donald Glover	Nominated	
Screen Actors Guild Awards	Outstanding Performance by an Ensemble in a Comedy Series	Khris Davis, Donald Glover, Brian Tyree Henry, and LaKeith Stanfield	Nominated	
Television Critics Association Awards	Program of the Year	Atlanta	Nominated	
Television Critics Association Awards	Outstanding Achievement in Comedy	Atlanta	Nominated	
Television Critics Association Awards	Individual Achievement in Comedy	Donald Glover	Nominated	
Writers Guild of America Awards	Comedy Series	Ibra Ake, Donald Glover, Stephen Glover, Taofik Kolade, Jamal Olori, Stefani Robinson, and Paul Simms	Nominated	

==== Season 3 ====
Award	Category	Nominees	Result	Ref.
American Society of Cinematographers Awards	Outstanding Achievement in Cinematography in an Episode of a Half-Hour Television Series	Stephen Murphy (for "New Jazz")	Nominated	
Black Reel Television Awards	Outstanding Comedy Series	Atlanta	Nominated	
Black Reel Television Awards	Outstanding Actor, Comedy Series	Donald Glover	Won	
Black Reel Television Awards	Outstanding Supporting Actor, Comedy Series	Brian Tyree Henry	Nominated	
Black Reel Television Awards	Outstanding Supporting Actor, Comedy Series	Lakeith Stanfield	Nominated	
Black Reel Television Awards	Outstanding Supporting Actress, Comedy Series	Zazie Beetz	Nominated	
Black Reel Television Awards	Outstanding Guest Actress, Comedy Series	Adriyan Rae	Nominated	
Black Reel Television Awards	Outstanding Directing, Comedy Series	Donald Glover (for "Tarrare")	Nominated	
Black Reel Television Awards	Outstanding Directing, Comedy Series	Donald Glover (for "Rich Wigga, Poor Wigga")	Nominated	
Black Reel Television Awards	Outstanding Writing, Comedy Series	Stephen Glover (for "Three Slaps")	Nominated	
Black Reel Television Awards	Outstanding Writing, Comedy Series	Donald Glover (for "Rich Wigga, Poor Wigga")	Nominated	
Black Reel Television Awards	Outstanding Music Supervision	Jen Malone	Nominated	
Hollywood Critics Association TV Awards	Best Cable Series, Comedy	Atlanta	Nominated	
Hollywood Critics Association TV Awards	Best Actor in a Broadcast Network or Cable Series, Comedy	Donald Glover	Nominated	
Hollywood Critics Association TV Awards	Best Supporting Actor in a Broadcast Network or Cable Series, Comedy	Brian Tyree Henry	Nominated	
Hollywood Critics Association TV Awards	Best Supporting Actress in a Broadcast Network or Cable Series, Comedy	Zazie Beetz	Nominated	
Hollywood Critics Association TV Awards	Best Directing in a Broadcast Network or Cable Series, Comedy	Hiro Murai (for "New Jazz")	Nominated	
Hollywood Critics Association TV Awards	Best Writing in a Broadcast Network or Cable Series, Comedy	Donald Glover (for "Rich Wigga, Poor Wigga")	Nominated	
Primetime Emmy Awards	Outstanding Lead Actor in a Comedy Series	Donald Glover (for "Sinterklaas Is Coming to Town")	Nominated	
Primetime Emmy Awards	Outstanding Directing for a Comedy Series	Hiro Murai (for "New Jazz")	Nominated	
Primetime Creative Arts Emmy Awards	Outstanding Cinematography for a Single-Camera Series (Half-Hour)	Christian Sprenger (for "Three Slaps")	Won	
Set Decorators Society of America Awards	Best Achievement in Décor/Design of a Half-Hour Single-Camera Series	Lisbeth Ayala, Timothy David O'Brien, and Jonathan Paul Green	Nominated	
Television Critics Association Awards	Outstanding Achievement in Comedy	Atlanta	Nominated	

==== Season 4 ====
Award	Category	Nominees	Result	Ref.
Golden Globe Awards	Best Performance by an Actor in a Television Series – Musical or Comedy	Donald Glover	Nominated	
NAACP Image Awards	Outstanding Comedy Series	Atlanta	Nominated	
NAACP Image Awards	Outstanding Actor in a Comedy Series	Donald Glover	Nominated	
NAACP Image Awards	Outstanding Supporting Actor in a Comedy Series	Brian Tyree Henry	Nominated	
NAACP Image Awards	Outstanding Directing in a Comedy Series	Angela Barnes	Won	
American Society of Cinematographers Awards	Outstanding Achievement in Cinematography in an Episode of a Half-Hour Television Series	Christian Sprenger (for "Andrew Wyeth. Alfred's World.")	Nominated	
Black Reel Television Awards	Outstanding Comedy Series	Atlanta	Nominated	
Black Reel Television Awards	Outstanding Lead Performance, Comedy Series	Donald Glover	Nominated	
Black Reel Television Awards	Outstanding Supporting Performance, Comedy Series	Zazie Beetz	Nominated	
Black Reel Television Awards	Outstanding Supporting Performance, Comedy Series	Brian Tyree Henry	Nominated	
Black Reel Television Awards	Outstanding Supporting Performance, Comedy Series	LaKeith Stanfield	Nominated	
Black Reel Television Awards	Outstanding Directing, Comedy Series	Donald Glover (for "The Goof Who Sat By the Door")	Won	
Black Reel Television Awards	Outstanding Writing, Comedy Series	Donald Glover (for "It Was All a Dream")	Won	
Black Reel Television Awards	Outstanding Writing, Comedy Series	Stephen Glover (for "The Most Atlanta")	Nominated	
Hollywood Critics Association TV Awards	Best Cable Series, Comedy	Atlanta	Nominated	
Hollywood Critics Association TV Awards	Best Supporting Actor in a Broadcast Network or Cable Series, Comedy	Brian Tyree Henry	Nominated	
Hollywood Critics Association TV Awards	Best Supporting Actress in a Broadcast Network or Cable Series, Comedy	Zazie Beetz	Nominated	
Primetime Emmy Awards	Outstanding Cinematography for a Single-Camera Series (Half-Hour)	Christian Sprenger (for "Andrew Wyeth. Alfred's World")	Won	
Peabody Awards	Entertainment	Atlanta	Won	
