= 23rd Annual Black Reel Awards =

Film-industry awards in 2023

23rd Black Reel Awards
- Date: February 6, 2023 (Film); January 16, 2024 (Television)

Highlights
- Most wins: The Woman King (6)
- Most nominations: Black Panther: Wakanda Forever / The Woman King (14)
- Outstanding Film: The Woman King

The 23rd Annual Black Reel Awards ceremony, presented by the Foundation for the Augmentation of African-Americans in Film (FAAAF) and honoring the best films of 2022, took place on February 6, 2023, and streamed on its website at 5:00 p.m. PST / 8:00 p.m. EST. During the ceremony, FAAAF presented the Black Reel Awards in 24 categories. The film nominations were announced on December 15, 2022.

Black Panther: Wakanda Forever and The Woman King led the film nominations with fourteen each, with the latter winning a total of six awards, the most wins by any film, including Outstanding Film.

With her third win for Outstanding Costume Design for Black Panther: Wakanda Forever, Ruth E. Carter became the most awarded technical award winner in Black Reel Awards history. Actress Angela Bassett became the first woman to win an acting and honorary award in the same year; she won for her work in Black Panther: Wakanda Forever and also received the Sidney Poitier Trailblazer Award, recognizing her career of acting excellence.

The 7th Annual Black Reel Awards for Television nominations were announced on June 15, 2023; the performance categories were merged into gender neutral ones while five technical categories were added. The miniseries The Best Man: The Final Chapters received 18 nominations, becoming the most nominated program in a single year in the history of the awards. The ceremony was initially scheduled for August 14, 2023, but due to the 2023 Hollywood labor disputes, the ceremony was delayed and rescheduled for January 16, 2024, combining both the film and television ceremonies.

Representatives for the Foundation for the Augmentation of African-Americans in Film (FAAAF) explained that temporarily rescheduling the television awards "gives the opportunity for the resolution of the strikes to occur and allow for the presence and participation of all the honorees".

"The best part about recognizing excellence in anything is giving those who have done the work the opportunity to shine," stated Tim Gordon, the Black Reel Awards' founder and executive director. "We felt announcing the winners on our site or in a press release would not appropriately honor the fantastic work of those in our entertainment community," he concluded.

== Film winners and nominees ==
Outstanding Film	Outstanding Director
The Woman King – Maria Bello, Viola Davis, Cathy Schulman and Julius Tennon, producers; Black Panther: Wakanda Forever – Kevin Feige and Nate Moore, producers; Devotion – Molly Smith, Rachel Smith, Thad Luckinbill and Trent Luckinbill, producers; Nope – Jordan Peele and Ian Cooper, producers; Till – Keith Beauchamp, Barbara Broccoli, Whoopi Goldberg, Michael Reilly and Thomas Levine, producers	Gina Prince-Bythewood – The Woman King; Elegance Bratton – The Inspection; Chinonye Chukwu – Till; Ryan Coogler – Black Panther: Wakanda Forever; Jordan Peele – Nope
Outstanding Actor	Outstanding Actress
Jeremy Pope – The Inspection as Ellis French; John Boyega – Breaking as Lance Corporal Brian Brown-Easley; Sterling K. Brown – Honk for Jesus. Save Your Soul. as Lee-Curtis Childs; Daniel Kaluuya – Nope as Otis "OJ" Haywood Jr.; Jonathan Majors – Devotion as Jesse L. Brown	Danielle Deadwyler – Till as Mamie Till-Mobley; Viola Davis – The Woman King as General Nanisca; Anna Diop – Nanny as Aisha; Regina Hall – Honk for Jesus. Save Your Soul. as Trinitie Childs; Letitia Wright – Black Panther: Wakanda Forever as Shuri / Black Panther
Outstanding Supporting Actor	Outstanding Supporting Actress
Brian Tyree Henry – Causeway as James Aucoin; Micheal Ward – Empire of Light as Stephen; Michael K. Williams – Breaking as Eli Bernard; Bokeem Woodbine – The Inspection as Leland Laws; Jeffrey Wright – The Batman as Lt. James Gordon	Angela Bassett – Black Panther: Wakanda Forever as Ramonda; Thuso Mbedu – The Woman King as Nawi; Janelle Monáe – Glass Onion: A Knives Out Mystery as Helen Brand / Cassandra "Andi" Brand; Keke Palmer – Nope as Emerald "Em" Haywood; Gabrielle Union – The Inspection as Inez French
Outstanding Breakthrough Male	Outstanding Breakthrough Female
Jeremy Pope – The Inspection as Ellis French; Jalyn Hall – Till as Emmett Till; Daryl McCormack – Good Luck to You, Leo Grande as Leo Grande / Connor; Quintessa Swindell – Black Adam as Maxine Hunkel / Cyclone; Micheal Ward – Empire of Light as Stephen	Thuso Mbedu – The Woman King as Nawi; Sheila Atim – The Woman King as Amenza; Charmaine Bingwa – Emancipation as Dodienne; Anna Diop – Nanny as Aisha; Dominique Thorne – Black Panther: Wakanda Forever as Riri Williams
Outstanding Ensemble	Outstanding Screenplay
The Woman King – Aisha Coley, casting director; Black Panther: Wakanda Forever – Sarah Finn, casting director; Honk for Jesus. Save Your Soul. – Shannon Reis, casting director; The Inspection – Kim Coleman, casting director; Till – Kim Coleman, casting director	Till – Keith Beauchamp, Michael Reilly, and Chinonye Chukwu; Black Panther: Wakanda Forever – Ryan Coogler and Joe Robert Cole; The Inspection – Elegance Bratton; Nanny – Nikyatu Jusu; Nope – Jordan Peele
Outstanding Documentary Feature	Outstanding Independent Film
Sidney – Reginald Hudlin, director; Aftershock – Paula Eislet and Tonya Lewis Lee, directors; Descendant – Margaret Brown, director; Is That Black Enough for You?!? – Elvis Mitchell, director; Louis Armstrong's Black & Blues – Sacha Jenkins, director	The Inspection – Elegance Bratton, director; Emergency – Carey Williams, director; Honk for Jesus. Save Your Soul. – Adamma Ebo, director; Master – Mariama Diallo, director; Nanny – Nikyatu Jusu, director
Outstanding Short Film	Outstanding International Film
North Star – P.J. Palmer, director; Angola Do You Hear Us? Voices from a Plantation Prison – Cinque Northern, director; Elegy: My Two Months in Harlem – Andre Lambertson, director; Fannie – Christine Swanson, director; New Moon – Jeremie Balais, Raúl Domingo and Jeffig Le Bars, directors	Saint Omer (France) – Alice Diop, director; Neptune Frost (Rwanda) – Saul Williams and Anisia Uzeyman, directors
Outstanding Voice Performance	Outstanding Soundtrack
Zoe Saldaña – Avatar: The Way of Water as Neytiri; Zazie Beetz – The Bad Guys as Diane Foxington / The Crimson Paw; Idris Elba – Sonic the Hedgehog 2 as Knuckles the Echidna; Keke Palmer – Lightyear as Izzy Hawthorne; Gabrielle Union – Strange World as Meridian Clade	Black Panther: Wakanda Forever; A Jazzman's Blues; Remember Me: The Mahalia Jackson Story; Till; The Woman King
Outstanding Emerging Director	Outstanding First Screenplay
Nikyatu Jusu – Nanny; Elegance Bratton – The Inspection; Adamma Ebo – Honk for Jesus. Save Your Soul.; Elvis Mitchell – Is That Black Enough for You?!?; Carey Williams – Emergency	The Inspection – Elegance Bratton; Honk for Jesus. Save Your Soul. – Adamma Ebo; Nanny – Nikyatu Jusu; Master – Mariama Diallo; On the Come Up – Kay Oyegun
Outstanding Original Song	Outstanding Score
"Lift Me Up" from Black Panther: Wakanda Forever – Rihanna, performer; Rihanna, Ryan Coogler, Ludwig Göransson and Tems, writers; "Born Again" from Black Panther: Wakanda Forever – Rihanna, performer; Rihanna, The-Dream, Ludwig Göransson and James Fauntleroy, writers; "Keep Rising" from The Woman King – Jessy Wilson and Angélique Kidjo, performers; Jessy Wilson, Angélique Kidjo and Jeremy Lutito, writers; "Paper Airplanes" from A Jazzman's Blues – Ruth B., performer; Ruth B. and Terence Blanchard, writers; "Stand Up" from Till – Jazmine Sullivan, performer; Jazmine Sullivan and D'Mile, writers	The Woman King – Terence Blanchard; Alice – Common; End of the Road – Craig Deleon; Nanny – Tanerélle and Bartek Gliniak; Nope – Michael Abels
Outstanding Cinematography	Outstanding Costume Design
Nope – Hoyte van Hoytema; Black Panther: Wakanda Forever – Autumn Durald Arkapaw; Emancipation – Robert Richardson; Till – Bobby Bukowski; The Woman King – Polly Morgan	Black Panther: Wakanda Forever – Ruth E. Carter; Honk for Jesus. Save Your Soul. – Lorraine Coppin; Nanny – Charlese Antoinette Jones; Till – Marci Rodgers; The Woman King – Gersha Phillips
Outstanding Editing	Outstanding Production Design
The Woman King – Terilyn A. Shropshire; Black Panther: Wakanda Forever – Michael P. Shawver, Kelley Dixon, and Jennifer Lame; Louis Armstrong's Black & Blues – Jason Pollard and Alma Herrera-Pazmino; Thirteen Lives – James D. Wilcox; Whitney Houston: I Wanna Dance with Somebody – Daysha Broadway	Black Panther: Wakanda Forever – Hannah Beachler; Devotion – Wynn Thomas; Nope – Ruth De Jong; Till – Curtis Beech; The Woman King – Akin Mckenzie

=== Honorary awards ===
- Vanguard Award – Effie T. Brown
- Sidney Poitier Trailblazer Award – Angela Bassett
- Ruby Dee Humanitarian Award – Kerry Washington
- Oscar Micheaux Impact Award – Debra Martin Chase

== Films with multiple nominations and awards ==
The following films received multiple nominations:

Nominations	Film
14	Black Panther: Wakanda Forever
14	The Woman King
11	Till
10	The Inspection
8	Nanny
8	Nope
7	Honk for Jesus. Save Your Soul.
3	Devotion
2	Breaking
2	Emancipation
2	Emergency
2	Empire of Light
2	Master
2	Is That Black Enough for You?!?
2	A Jazzman's Blues
2	Louis Armstrong's Black & Blues

The following films received multiple awards:

Wins	Film
6	The Woman King
5	Black Panther: Wakanda Forever
4	The Inspection
2	Till

== Television winners and nominees ==
=== Comedy ===
Outstanding Comedy Series
Abbott Elementary – Quinta Brunson, showrunner (ABC); Atlanta – Donald Glover, showrunner (FX); Harlem – Tracy Oliver, showrunner (Prime Video); Unprisoned – Yvette Lee Bowser, showrunner (Hulu); The Upshaws – Regina Y. Hicks, showrunner (Netflix)
Outstanding Lead Performance in a Comedy Series	Outstanding Supporting Performance in a Comedy Series
Quinta Brunson – Abbott Elementary as Janine Teagues (ABC); Tichina Arnold – The Neighborhood as Tina Butler (CBS); Cedric the Entertainer – The Neighborhood as Calvin Butler (CBS); Donald Glover – Atlanta as Earnest "Earn" Marks (FX); Meagan Good – Harlem as Camille Parks (Prime Video); Jasmine Cephas Jones – Blindspotting as Ashley Rose (Starz); Delroy Lindo – Unprisoned as Edwin Alexander (Hulu); Robin Thede – A Black Lady Sketch Show as Various Characters (HBO); Kerry Washington – Unprisoned as Paige Alexander (Hulu); Patricia "Ms. Pat" Williams – The Ms. Pat Show as Patricia "Pat" Ford Carson (BET+)	Sheryl Lee Ralph – Abbott Elementary as Barbara Howard (ABC); Zazie Beetz – Atlanta as Vanessa "Van" Kiefer (FX); William Stanford Davis – Abbott Elementary as Mr. Johnson (ABC); Ayo Edebiri – The Bear as Sydney Adamu (FX on Hulu); Brian Tyree Henry – Atlanta as Alfred "Paper Boi" Miles (FX); Janelle James – Abbott Elementary as Ava Coleman (ABC); Toheeb Jimoh – Ted Lasso as Samuel "Sam" Obisanya (Apple TV+); Danielle Pinnock – Ghost as Alberta Haynes (CBS); LaKeith Stanfield – Atlanta as Darius Epps (FX); Tyler James Williams – Abbott Elementary as Gregory Eddie (ABC)
Outstanding Guest Performance in a Comedy Series
Taraji P. Henson – Abbott Elementary as Vanetta Teagues (ABC); Quinta Brunson – Saturday Night Live as Host (NBC); Don Cheadle – Dave as Himself (FXX); Zach Fox – Abbott Elementary as Tariq Temple (ABC); Whoopi Goldberg – Harlem as Dr. Elise Pruitt (Prime Video); Lil Rel Howery – Poker Face as Taffy Boyle (Peacock); Orlando Jones – Abbott Elementary as Martin Eddie (ABC); S. Epatha Merkerson – Poker Face as Joyce Harris (Peacock); Leslie Odom Jr. – Abbott Elementary as Draemond Winding (ABC); Issa Rae – A Black Lady Sketch Show as Various Characters (HBO)
Outstanding Directing in a Comedy Series	Outstanding Writing in a Comedy Series
Atlanta ("The Goof Who Sat By the Door") – Directed by Donald Glover (FX); Abbott Elementary ("Mom") – Directed by Ken Whittingham (ABC); Abbott Elementary ("Read-A-Thon") – Directed by Dime Davis (ABC); Ted Lasso ("Big Week") – Directed by Destiny Ekaragha (Apple TV+); Unprisoned ("Nigrescence") – Directed by Numa Perrier (Hulu)	Atlanta ("It Was All a Dream") – Written by Donald Glover (FX); Abbott Elementary ("Educator of the Year") – Written by Jordan Temple (ABC); Abbott Elementary ("Franklin Institute") – Written by Brittani Nichols (ABC); Abbott Elementary ("Mom") – Written by Ava Coleman (ABC); Atlanta ("The Most Atlanta") – Written by Stephen Glover (FX)

=== Drama ===
Outstanding Drama Series
Snowfall – Dave Andron, showrunner (FX); Bel-Air – Carla Banks Waddles, showrunner (Peacock); Godfather of Harlem – Chris Brancato, showrunner (MGM+); P-Valley – Katori Hall, showrunner (Starz); Queen Charlotte: A Bridgerton Story – Shonda Rhimes, showrunner (Netflix)
Outstanding Lead Performance in a Drama Series	Outstanding Supporting Performance in a Drama Series
Damson Idris – Snowfall as Franklin Saint (FX); Jacob Anderson – Interview with the Vampire as Louis de Pointe du Lac (AMC); Nicco Annan – P-Valley as Uncle Clifford Sayles (Starz); Jabari Banks – Bel-Air as Will Smith (Peacock); Angela Bassett – 9-1-1 as Athena Grant-Nash (FOX); Queen Latifah – The Equalizer as Robyn McCall (CBS); Patina Miller – Power Book III: Raising Kanan as Raquel Thomas (Starz); Harold Perrineau – From as Boyd Stevens (MGM+); Octavia Spencer – Truth Be Told as Poppy Parnell (Apple TV+); Forest Whitaker – Godfather of Harlem as Ellsworth "Bumpy" Johnson (MGM+)	Giancarlo Esposito – Better Call Saul as Gus Fring (AMC); Adjoa Andoh – Queen Charlotte: A Bridgerton Story as Lady Agatha Danbury (Netflix); Brandee Evans – P-Valley as Mercedes Woodbine (Starz); Aisha Hinds – 9-1-1 as Henrietta "Hen" Wilson (FOX); Amin Joseph – Snowfall as Jerome Saint (FX); Angela Lewis – Snowfall as Louanne "Louie" Saint (FX); J. Alphonse Nicholson – P-Valley as LaMarques / Lil Murda (Starz); Sarah Niles – Riches as Claudia Richards (Prime Video); Golda Rosheuvel – Queen Charlotte: A Bridgerton Story as Queen Charlotte (Netflix); Arsema Thomas – Queen Charlotte: A Bridgerton Story as Young Agatha (Netflix)
Outstanding Guest Performance in a Drama Series
Storm Reid – The Last of Us as Riley Abel (HBO); Loretta Devine – P-Valley as Ernestine Sayles (Starz); Giancarlo Esposito – The Mandalorian as Moff Gideon (Disney+); Lamar Johnson – The Last of Us as Henry Burrell (HBO); DeVaughn Nixon – Snowfall as Kane Hamilton (FX); Nico Parker – The Last of Us as Sarah (HBO); Phylicia Rashad – The Good Fight as Renetta Clark (Paramount+); Glynn Turman – Queen Sugar as Ernest Bordelon (OWN); Forest Whitaker – Andor as Saw Gerrera (Disney+); Keivonn Woodard – The Last of Us as Sam (HBO)
Outstanding Directing in a Drama Series	Outstanding Writing in a Drama Series
Reasonable Doubt ("Can't Knock the Hustle") – Directed by Kerry Washington (Hulu); P-Valley ("Mississippi Rule") – Directed by Katori Hall (Starz); Queen Sugar ("For They Existed") – Directed by Ava DuVernay (OWN); Snowfall ("Ballad of the Bear") – Directed by Amin Joseph (FX); The Umbrella Academy ("Pocket Full of Lightning") – Directed by Cheryl Dunye (Netflix)	Queen Charlotte: A Bridgerton Story ("Queen to Be") – Written by Shonda Rhimes (Netflix); Godfather of Harlem ("Captain Fields") – Written by Moises Verneau and Dean Imperial (MGM+); Queen Sugar ("For They Existed") – Written by Ava DuVernay (OWN); Snowfall ("Charnel House") – Written by Walter Mosley (FX); Snowfall ("The Sit Down") – Written by Jeanine Daniels and Dave Andron (FX)

=== Television Movie or Limited Series ===
Outstanding Television Movie or Limited Series
The Best Man: The Final Chapters – Malcolm D. Lee, showrunner (Peacock); Black Girl Missing (Lifetime); Entergalatic – Michael Penketh and Mike Moon, producers (Netflix); Praise This – Will Packer, Tim Story and James Lopez, producers (Peacock); Swarm – Janine Nabers, showrunner (Prime Video)
Outstanding Lead Performance in a TV Movie/Limited Series	Outstanding Supporting Performance in a TV Movie/Limited Series
Dominique Fishback – Swarm as Andrea "Dre" Greene (Prime Video); Taye Diggs – The Best Man: The Final Chapters as Harper Stewart (Peacock); Giancarlo Esposito – Kaleidoscope as Leo Pap / Ray Vernon (Netflix); Regina Hall – The Best Man: The Final Chapters as Candace "Candy" Sparks (Peacock); Brian Tyree Henry – Class of '09 as Tayo Michaels (FX on Hulu); Terrence Howard – The Best Man: The Final Chapters as Quentin Spivey (Peacock); Sanaa Lathan – The Best Man: The Final Chapters as Robyn Stewart (Peacock); Nia Long – The Best Man: The Final Chapters as Jordan Armstrong (Peacock); Harold Perrineau – The Best Man: The Final Chapters as Julian "Murch" Murchison (Peacock); Zoe Saldaña – From Scratch as Amy Wheeler (Netflix)	Niecy Nash-Betts – Dahmer – Monster: The Jeffrey Dahmer Story as Glenda Cleveland (Netflix); Morris Chestnut – The Best Man: The Final Chapters as Lance Sullivan (Peacock); Keith David – From Scratch as Hershel Wheeler (Netflix); Danielle Deadwyler – From Scratch as Zora Wheeler (Netflix); Melissa De Sousa – The Best Man: The Final Chapters as Shelby Taylor (Peacock); Tati Gabrielle – Kaleidoscope as Hannah Kim (Netflix); Russell Hornsby – Mike as Don King (Hulu); Lance Reddick – White Men Can't Jump as Benji (Hulu); Trevante Rhodes – Bruiser as Porter (Hulu); Aisha Tyler – The Last Thing He Told Me as Jules Taylor (Apple TV+)
Outstanding Directing in a TV Movie or Limited Series	Outstanding Writing in a TV Movie or Limited Series
The Best Man: The Final Chapters ("Brown Girl Dreaming") – Directed by Robert Townsend (Peacock); The Best Man: The Final Chapters ("The Party") – Directed by Charles Stone III (Peacock); The Best Man: The Final Chapters ("The Wedding") – Directed by Malcolm D. Lee (Peacock); From Scratch ("Aftertastes") – Directed by Nzingha Stewart (Netflix); Swarm ("Running Scared") – Directed by Ibra Ake (Prime Video)	Swarm ("Running Scared") – Written by Ibra Ake and Stephen Glover (Prime Video); The Best Man: The Final Chapters ("The Audacity of Hope") – Written by James Bland and Malcolm D. Lee (Peacock); The Best Man: The Final Chapters ("Brown Girl Dreaming") – Written by Lori Lakin Hutcherson (Peacock); The Best Man: The Final Chapters ("The Invisible Man") – Written by Ayanna Floyd Davis (Peacock); Swarm ("Fallin' Through the Cracks") – Written by Karen Joseph Adcock and Stephen Glover (Prime Video)

=== Other programs ===
Outstanding Documentary	Outstanding Variety, Sketch, or Talk – Series or Special
Dear Mama – Allen Hughes, director (FX); The 1619 Project – Roger Ross Williams, Phil Bertelsen, Jonathan Clasberry, Kamilah Forbes, Shoshana Guy, Naimah Jabali-Nash and Christina Turner, directors (Hulu); Bill Russell: Legend – Sam Pollard, director (Netflix); Love to Love You, Donna Summer – Brooklyn Sudano and Roger Ross Williams, directors (HBO); Surviving R. Kelly Part III: The Final Chapter – Nigel Bellis and Astral Finnie, directors (Lifetime)	A Black Lady Sketch Show (HBO); The Daily Show with Trevor Noah (Comedy Central); The Jennifer Hudson Show (Syndication); Marvel Studios: Assembled – The Making of Black Panther: Wakanda Forever (Disney+); Yvonne Orji: A Whole Me (Max)

=== Music categories ===
Outstanding Musical Score	Outstanding Music Supervision
Queen Charlotte: A Bridgerton Story – Kris Bowers; Entergalatic – Dot da Genius and Patrick "Plain Pat" Reynolds (Netflix); Praise This – Jermaine Stegall, composer; Swarm – Michael Uzowuru (Prime Video); Unprisoned – Jimmy Jam and Terry Lewis (Hulu)	The Best Man: The Final Chapters – Erica Grayson and Toko Nagata (Peacock); BMF – Derryck "Big Tank" Thornton (Starz); P-Valley – Stephanie Diaz-Matos, Sarah Bromberg, and Katori Hall (Starz); Queen Sugar – Aamina Gant (OWN); Rap Sh!t – Sarah Bromberg, Stephanie Diaz-Matos, and Phillippe Pierre (Max)
Outstanding Original Song
"Get It on the Floor" from P-Valley – Written and performed by Megan Thee Stallion and J. Alphonse Nicholson (Starz); "A Feeling I've Never Been" from Queen Charlotte: A Bridgerton Story – Written by Kris Bowers and Tayla Parx; Performed by Kris Bowers; "Angel" from Entergalatic – Written by Kid Cudi, Jean Baptiste, SADPONY, and Justin Raisen; Performed by Kid Cudi (Netflix); "Hustle, Repeat" from Godfather of Harlem – Written and performed by Jadakiss and Swizz Beatz (MGM+); "Something Like That" from Swarm – Written by Riley Mackin, KIRBY, and Childish Gambino; Performed by Ni'Jah

=== Technical categories ===
Outstanding Cinematography	Outstanding Costume Design
Kindred – Cybel Martin (FX on Hulu); A Black Lady Sketch Show – Kevin Atkinson (HBO); The Equalizer – Terrence Laron Burke (CBS); Random Acts of Flyness – Shawn Peters (HBO); Rise – Kabelo Thathe (Disney+)	P-Valley – Tiffany Hasbourne (Starz); The Best Man: The Final Chapters – Danielle Hollowell (Peacock); A Black Lady Sketch Show – Michelle Page Collins (HBO); Kindred – Jaclyn Banner (FX on Hulu); Swarm – Dominique Dawson (Prime Video)
Outstanding Editing	Outstanding Makeup & Hairstyling
Power Book II: Ghost – Spenser Reich (Starz); Kindred – Shannon Baker Davis (FX on Hulu); Random Acts of Flyness – Jonathan Proctor and Terence Nance (HBO); Rap Sh!t – Lynarion Hubbard (Max); Unprisoned – Christine Armstrong (Hulu)	P-Valley – J. Denelle and Arlene Martin (Starz); Abbott Elementary – Alisha L. Baijounas and Moira Fraizer (ABC); The Best Man: The Final Chapters – Ashunta Sheriff and Shellie Biviens (Peacock); A Black Lady Sketch Show – Jacqueline Knowlton and Shavonne Brown (HBO); Kindred – Geno Freeman and Elizabeth Robinson (FX on Hulu)
Outstanding Production Design
Kindred – Nora Mendis (FX on Hulu); Praise This – Keith Brian Burns (Peacock); Random Acts of Flyness – Nora Mendis (HBO)

== Programs with multiple nominations ==
The following programs received multiple nominations:

Nominations	Program
18	The Best Man: The Final Chapters
16	Abbott Elementary
10	P-Valley
8	Atlanta
8	Snowfall
8	Swarm
7	Queen Charlotte: A Bridgerton Story
6	A Black Lady Sketch Show
6	Unprisoned
5	Kindred
4	From Scratch
4	Godfather of Harlem
4	The Last of Us
4	Queen Sugar
3	Entergalatic
3	Harlem
3	Praise This
3	Random Acts of Flyness
2	9-1-1
2	Bel-Air
2	The Equalizer
2	Kaleidoscope
2	The Neighborhood
2	Poker Face
2	Rap Sh!t
2	Ted Lasso
