= Atlanta season 4 =

Season of television series

Atlanta
- Season 4
- Promotional poster
- Showrunner: Donald Glover
- Starring: Donald Glover; Brian Tyree Henry; Lakeith Stanfield; Zazie Beetz
- No. of episodes: 10

Release
- Original network: FX
- Original release: September 15 – November 10, 2022

Season chronology
- ← Previous; Season 3

The fourth and final season of the American television series Atlanta premiered on FX on September 15, 2022. The season is produced by Gilga, 343 Incorporated, MGMT. Entertainment, and FXP, with Donald Glover, Paul Simms, Dianne McGunigle, Stephen Glover, Hiro Murai, and Stefani Robinson serving as executive producers. Donald Glover serves as creator and showrunner.

The season was ordered in August 2019, which would later be revealed to be the final season in February 2022. It stars Donald Glover, Brian Tyree Henry, LaKeith Stanfield, and Zazie Beetz. The series follows Earn during his daily life in Atlanta, Georgia, as he tries to redeem himself in the eyes of his ex-girlfriend Van, who is also the mother of his daughter Lottie; as well as his parents and his cousin Alfred, who raps under the stage name "Paper Boi"; and Darius, Alfred's eccentric right-hand man. After having the characters stay in Europe in the previous season, the season follows the characters as they return to Atlanta.

The season has been universally acclaimed for its acting, writing, directing, cinematography, and tension; with some declaring it a return to form from the previous season.

== Cast and characters ==
=== Main ===
- Donald Glover as Earnest "Earn" Marks / Kirkwood Chocolate
- Brian Tyree Henry as Alfred "Paper Boi" Miles
- LaKeith Stanfield as Darius
- Zazie Beetz as Vanessa "Van" Keefer

=== Recurring ===
- Austin Elle Fisher as Lottie Marks

=== Guest ===
- Khris Davis as Tracy
- Katt Williams as Willie
- Isiah Whitlock Jr. as Raleigh Marks
- Soulja Boy as himself
- Brian McKnight as himself
- Sinbad as himself
- Jenna Wortham as themself
- Cree Summer as herself
- Gunna as himself

== Episodes ==
No. overall	No. in season	Title	Directed by	Written by	Original release date	Prod. code	U.S. viewers (millions)
32	1	"The Most Atlanta"	Hiro Murai	Stephen Glover	September 15, 2022	XAA04001	0.216
While trying to return an air fryer to a Target during a riot, Darius is targeted and followed across the city by a mobility scooter-bound white woman who tries to stab him. Al realizes Blueblood, a deceased rapper, has left clues to a scavenger hunt in the lyrics of his final album, which he follows until he arrives at Blueblood's funeral and is gifted a plant for finding it. Earn and Van get lost in Atlantic Station and realize all of their ex-partners are trapped there, discovering an exit and using it to get out with Earn's ex-girlfriend Kenya. The exit deposits them at the funeral and they leave with Al, meeting Darius in the parking lot, and he gives Kenya the air fryer. As the four leave, Kenya hears the sound of the scooter behind her.
33	2	"The Homeliest Little Horse"	Angela Barnes	Ibra Ake	September 15, 2022	XAA04003	0.126
In therapy, Earn reveals why he was kicked out of Princeton University: he asked his fellow RA, a white woman, to hold on to his suit for an upcoming job interview but could not get in touch with her when he needed it, so he used his master key to get into her room and take the suit. This led to her getting him expelled, and the therapist relates this breach of trust to the sexual abuse Earn underwent at the hands of a family member at a young age. In another session, Earn explains that he was invited to speak at a Princeton seminar and decided to go with Van and Lottie, but the trip was ruined when they were racially profiled at the airport by a TSA agent. Earn decides he is ready to leave therapy, but hires dozens of actors to set up the agent's dream of writing a successful children's book and then ruin it for her. Al and Darius are unimpressed when he explains this to them, and he decides he needs to go back to therapy.
34	3	"Born 2 Die"	Adamma Ebo	Jamal Olori	September 22, 2022	XAA04002	0.174
Hoping to sign D'Angelo, Earn is sent to a desolate room in a building where he waits for several days, finally being granted access to D'Angelo through a secret hole in the wall after reaching an understanding. Inside, he meets a man who explains that D'Angelo is not a real person, but a group of people around the world facilitating his image. He helps Earn reach an understanding about a recurring dream he has, but Earn does not sign him when he asks. Al is advised by a group of rappers to look for young, white talent and sign it, so he partners up with a rapper named "Yodel Kid". Yodel Kid wins a Grammy, but overdoses and dies the day of the award show. Al admits to Earn that he did not enjoy managing and asks how he does it, and Earn tells him that he focuses on what leaves a legacy.
35	4	"Light Skinned-ed"	Hiro Murai	Stefani Robinson	September 29, 2022	XAA04004	0.147
While going to church, Earn and his aunt Jeanie are abandoned by his mother, who takes off with her father to get him away from Jeanie and spend time with him. Believing that Earn is in on the plot, Jeanie follows him to Al's studio and forces them to stay with her as she argues with her siblings over the phone about their contempt for her. When she calls the police, a studio worker helps Al and Earn escape out the back. Earn's recently retired father Raleigh goes to the mall, adhering to his tight schedule to avoid the post-church crowd but gets distracted when a woman convinces him to buy a hat, leading him to get humiliated by a group of young men as the crowd arrives. The family meets up for dinner, where a hatless Raleigh becomes angry at a young waiter who refuses to package bread to go.
36	5	"Work Ethic!"	Donald Glover	Janine Nabers	October 6, 2022	XAA04005	0.117
Van takes a one-time job as a sitcom actress in a studio run by the enigmatic, unseen producer known as "Mr. Chocolate." She brings along Lottie, who talks during one of Van's takes and catches Mr. Chocolate's attention, and he hires and begins filming with her without Van's permission. Van starts to frantically search for her daughter as she is shuttled from lot to lot. An older female staff member helps her break into Mr. Chocolate's studio and confront him, where he explains that Van, having viewed her without context through his security cameras, could also be one of his characters after she disparages his shows. He gives her back Lottie, but Van forces her to leave when she says she wants to stay. Returning home, Van explains to Lottie that Mr. Chocolate's shows exploit her race and that she needs to be above them for her own sake.
37	6	"Crank Dat Killer"	Hiro Murai	Stephen Glover	October 13, 2022	XAA04006	0.253
A serial killer begins tracking down people who recorded videos of them dancing to Soulja Boy's "Crank That", which Al has a video of up on YouTube. Becoming increasingly paranoid, he goes to a mall where he runs into a man who tries to kill him, causing a mall-wide shootout involving several people. Earn and Darius try to get free Nikes off a man who requests that they kiss to earn them, but he is accidentally shot dead by the man just as they do, allowing them to take the shoes. Al is rescued by an untalented rapper he has been avoiding, forcing him to record a song with the man for saving his life. Al later learns that the killer was an entirely different man and the shooter was an old high school enemy, while Darius attempts to do his own rendition of a "Crank That" dance to Al's new song.
38	7	"Snipe Hunt"	Hiro Murai	Francesca Sloane	October 20, 2022	XAA04007	0.114
Earn rents out a full campground so Lottie can have her sixth birthday undisturbed. As she enjoys her birthday out in the woods, Earn tries to convince Van to move to Los Angeles with him, as he has recently gotten a job offer there. They have a long, emotional discussion about their relationship where Van answers his question about moving with a yes, and they affirm that they love each other.
39	8	"The Goof Who Sat By the Door"	Donald Glover	Francesca Sloane & Karen Joseph Adcock	October 27, 2022	XAA04009	0.190
The episode is presented as a documentary aired on B.A.N. about Thomas Washington, a black animator who was accidentally voted in as the temporary CEO of Disney. With his new power, Washington set out to make "the blackest movie of all time": A Goofy Movie, the plot being inspired by his relationship with his son Maxwell. As the stressors of the work and the imminent end of his position started to close in on Washington, he began to drink heavily and verbally abuse his wife and son. While he was struggling mentally, the other executives tampered with the film to remove his original black vision, resulting in Washington driving his car into the lake where he and his son would go to fish, the primary inspiration for the movie's plot. His widow affirms that, despite what ended up happening to him, Washington left an important mark on black culture, something he always wanted.
40	9	"Andrew Wyeth. Alfred's World."	Hiro Murai	Taofik Kolade	November 3, 2022	XAA04008	0.126
Al purchases and moves to a farm out in the middle of nowhere, where he has cultivated the plant he got at Blueblood's funeral into several more and is trying to fix a broken tractor he found on the property. Something begins eating his plants, and when he fixes the tractor and goes for a ride, it falls off a ledge and lands on his foot. He manages to get it free and drags himself back to the farm, only to find a pack of wild hogs eating more of his plants. One of them attacks him, and he beats it to death with a skillet he ordered off of Amazon. Earn, whose calls he has been avoiding, calls him, and he answers but does not discuss his plight. The next morning, he FaceTimes Earn, who warns him to be careful out there and advises him to come back to Atlanta, but Al declines.
41	10	"It Was All a Dream"	Hiro Murai	Donald Glover	November 10, 2022	XAA04010	0.223
While walking to his session at a flotation therapy spa, Darius meets an old girlfriend and watches in horror as she steals a cop's gun, runs over a white woman, and leaves him in her car, only to realize this is all a bad dream brought on by the sensory deprivation. He is thrown out of the spa when he tries to "wake up" the other patrons, believing he is still in the tank, only to realize he is when he goes to his brother's apartment and notices Judge Judy, playing on the TV, has a larger behind than in reality, his signal that he is in a dream. Al and Earn go to the first black-owned sushi restaurant in Atlanta per Van's request, but Al is put off by the food and continually requests to go to Popeyes. When they bring out the blowfish, the three move to leave, only for the restaurant owner to deliver a speech about how black people are conditioned not to trust each other and try to lock them in. Darius saves them and drives them back to Al's in a stolen Maserati, still believing he is dreaming. As his friends go outside to smoke, Darius turns on Judge Judy and smiles with relief when she stands up, although the audience does not see the outcome.

== Production ==
=== Development ===
The series was renewed for a fourth season in August 2019, even before the third season started filming. FX President Eric Schrier commented, "What more can be said about Atlanta than the critical acclaim and accolades that Donald, Paul Simms, Dianne McGunigle, Stephen Glover and Hiro Murai have earned for two exceptional seasons of what is clearly one of the best shows on television. This group of collaborators and cast have created one of the most original, innovative stories of this generation and we are proud to be their partners."

In February 2022, FX confirmed that the series would end with the fourth season. Glover considered ending the series with the second season, but he chose to end the series with the fourth season as "Death is natural. I feel like when the conditions are right for something, they happen, and when the conditions aren't right, they don't happen. I don't feel any longevity. Because then things start to get weird. The story was always supposed to be what it was. And the story, it really was us. Everybody in that writers' room, everybody on set. It really was what we were going through and what we talked about." He further added, "It was great, all of that came out this season and it ends perfectly." Despite that, Glover also suggested that he could revisit the series, saying "If there's a reason to do it, of course. Like a Christmas special. It always depends. I like keeping my options open."

=== Writing ===
Executive producer Hiro Murai described, "we're back in Atlanta again and it was kind of a homecoming season and it was really lovely. We got to say goodbye properly to the city and the show, I think it'll feel a little nostalgic too because I don't think you've seen Atlanta during the summer since season one. It's kind of like the greatest hits season."

After the polarizing reception to the anthology episodes from the previous season, Glover commented, "'We know you hated them. It's fine. I'm really proud of those episodes" while Stephen Glover said, "Those episodes felt, for a lot of people, out of the way we do things. But for me, it's kind of like we've always done stuff like that. In Season 4, I think there's some elements of and pieces of that... that maybe people won't hate as much this time?"

=== Filming ===
In August 2019, FX confirmed that the season would start filming in spring 2020, filming back-to-back with the third season. However, production was shut down amidst the COVID-19 pandemic. Production would resume in summer 2021, after filming part of the third season in Europe. In August 2021, FX confirmed that the season was already in production. By February 2022, FX confirmed that filming for the season and the series had wrapped.

== Release ==
=== Broadcast ===
In January 2020, Chairman of FX, John Landgraf said that the season would air in fall 2021, with the third season airing at the beginning of the year. However, due to production pausing due to the COVID-19 pandemic, Landgraf said the seasons would not be ready for their intended 2021 premiere dates, later signaling that the seasons would premiere in 2022. In December 2021, FX stated that the season would premiere in fall 2022. In August 2022, it was confirmed that the season would premiere on September 15, 2022, with the first two episodes.

=== Marketing ===
In August 2022, a trailer for the season was released.

== Reception ==
=== Critical reception ===
Based upon the first three episodes given to critics, the fourth season has received critical acclaim, with many considering it an improvement over season three. The season has a score of 82 out of 100 on Metacritic, based on 10 critics, indicating "universal acclaim". On Rotten Tomatoes, it has an approval rating of 98% based on 119 reviews, with the website's critical consensus reading, "Foregrounding its characters and namesake again after an anthological sojourn in Europe, Atlanta closes out in its sweet spot: funny, insightful, and weird as hell."

Atlanta season 4: Critical reception by episode
Atlanta season 4 (2022): Percentage of positive critics' reviews tracked by the website Rotten Tomatoes
