= Andrew Wyeth. Alfred's World. =

- Atlanta episode
- Episode no.: Season 4 Episode 9
- Directed by: Hiro Murai
- Written by: Taofik Kolade
- Cinematography by: Christian Sprenger
- Editing by: Kyle Reiter; Isaac Hagy
- Production code: XAA04008
- Original air date: November 3, 2022
- Running time: 33 minutes

Guest appearance
- Steve Coulter as Clyde

Episode chronology
← Previous "The Goof Who Sat By the Door"	Next → "It Was All a Dream"
- Atlanta season 4

"Andrew Wyeth. Alfred's World." is the ninth and penultimate episode of the fourth season of the American comedy-drama television series Atlanta. It is the 40th overall episode of the series and was written by supervising producer Taofik Kolade, and directed by executive producer Hiro Murai. It was first broadcast on FX in the United States on November 3, 2022.

The series is set in Atlanta and follows Earnest "Earn" Marks, as he tries to redeem himself in the eyes of his ex-girlfriend Van, who is also the mother of his daughter Lottie; as well as his parents and his cousin Alfred, who raps under the stage name "Paper Boi"; and Darius, Alfred's eccentric right-hand man. After staying in Europe for a tour during the previous season, the season sees the characters back in Atlanta. In the episode, Alfred moves to a safe farm and experiences difficult situations that seem to disturb his peace.

According to Nielsen Media Research, the episode was seen by an estimated 0.126 million household viewers and gained a 0.05 ratings share among adults aged 18–49. The episode received extremely positive reviews from critics, who praised Brian Tyree Henry's performance, Murai's directing, character development, tension and cinematography.

== Plot ==
Alfred (Brian Tyree Henry) practices at a shooting range in the woods, ignoring Earn's phone calls. He then leaves for a farm he purchased, where he is cultivating marijuana, originating from the original plant that he received at Blueblood's funeral. (Note: As depicted in "The Most Atlanta".)

Alfred discovers an abandoned tractor nearby and sets out to repair it using a tutorial from a YouTuber named "These Backhoes Ain't Loyal". That night, he hears sounds coming from his shed. When he opens it, he doesn't find anyone but finds his marijuana cultivation ruined. He questions a hardware store owner, Clyde (Steve Coulter), about the events and he deduces that a feral hog was responsible, that wants to eat Alfred's cultivation. Alfred lies that his cultivation was corn, so Clyde suggests that he take corn to the outside as bait and then kill the hog when it starts eating it. Clyde states that the hog shouldn't just be poisoned but also killed, stating that the hog will kill Alfred if given the chance, prompting Alfred to laugh it off. After repairing the shed, Alfred uses the marijuana to lure out the hog. However, he oversleeps and is too late to stop the hog from eating the marijuana.

He continues working on the tractor, discovering a dead mouse in an engine and often missing vital parts of the tutorial that nearly cost him his life. The next day, he finally fixes the tractor and excitedly takes it for a ride. However, the tractor soon gets jammed on a ledge. As he tries to move it over, the tractor tumbles towards him as he falls off and is knocked unconscious. Waking up a few hours later, he finds that his left foot was crushed by the tractor, and starts limping towards his farm. As he arrives, he finds the hogs eating his marijuana. One of the hogs sees Alfred and charges towards him, ramming him to a wall. Alfred then fights with the hog, struggling to kill him. He then takes a skillet he ordered from Amazon and uses it to beat the hog to death.

Earn once again calls and this time, Alfred answers. When Earn (Donald Glover) asks how is it going, Alfred states that it is boring living there. The next day, they talk through FaceTime, with Alfred not revealing anything about the hog. Earn notes that while he may like living on the farm, he should be careful as he may not be reported missing for weeks if he ever disappeared. He talks to Alfred about going back to Atlanta, but Alfred states that he is fine where he is.

== Production ==
=== Development ===
"They always making Paper Boi go through something."

— Official description in the press release for the episode.

In October 2022, FX announced that the ninth episode of the season would be titled "Andrew Wyeth. Alfred's World." and that it would be written by supervising producer Taofik Kolade, and directed by executive producer Hiro Murai. This was Kolade's third writing credit, and Murai's 25th directing credit.

=== Writing ===
The title of the episode is a reference to Andrew Wyeth's painting Christina's World, in which a woman poised on the ground looks up towards a grey Colonial Farmhouse on the horizon, the Olson House. Her back toward the viewer she leans forward using her arms for legs as she drags herself across a treeless tawny field. The painting is partly re-imagined in the episode for a scene in the climax, where a wounded Alfred crawls towards a house, only to be stopped by a river across him.

== Reception ==
=== Viewers ===
The episode was watched by 0.126 million viewers, earning a 0.05 in the 18–49 rating demographics on the Nielson ratings scale. This means that 0.05 percent of all households with televisions watched the episode. This was a slight decrease from the previous episode, which was watched by 0.190 million viewers with a 0.06 in the 18-49 demographics.

=== Critical reviews ===
"Andrew Wyeth. Alfred's World." received extremely positive reviews from critics. The review aggregator website Rotten Tomatoes reported a 100% approval rating, based on seven reviews.

Quinci LeGardye of The A.V. Club gave the episode a "B+" and writing, "Though this chill bottle episode is underwhelming as a penultimate outing, it does follow the overall Atlanta style. Strip away the unpredictability — shifting genres, impeccable needle drops, surrealist flair, and gorgeous filmmaking — and Atlanta's about a group of people making their way from a life of hustling to a future of some sort of peace and calm."

Alan Sepinwall of Rolling Stone wrote, "That final exchange includes a much weightier line than Earn intends, when he tells Al, 'Atlanta's not going anywhere, y'know?' The city is not, but the TV show named for it goes away one week from tonight. That's it. No more. Finis. And just as 'Snipe Hunt' felt like it was putting a button on Earn and Van's story, this one plays as if it could easily be the conclusion to Al's."

Ile-Ife Okantah of Vulture gave the episode a 3 star rating out of 5 and wrote, "I wish the episodes were longer; I bet if this was an hour long and had a more detailed plot, I would have rated it 4 stars, but sometimes it feels like a lot to smash into a half-hour episode. Call me greedy, but a talent like Brian Tyree Henry needs more time." Christian Hubbard of Full Circle Cinema gave the episode a perfect 10 out of 10 rating and wrote:

Episode 9 gives the fans one final chance to really spend some time with one of the actors who has benefitted the most from the success of Atlanta. Since the show's debut, Brian Tyree Henry, who found early success on Broadway before the show, is now a part of the Marvel Cinematic Universe as the Eternal Phastos and in hit action films like Godzilla vs. Kong and Bullet Train. The man is a bona fide movie star, and it will be bittersweet to see him walkway from the role of Paper Boi. However, this episode serves as a perfect example of his talent. It's going to be exciting to follow Henry on his path toward even more greatness. The episode ends with a reminder of the wholesome brotherhood Earn and Alfred have as they argue over if Black people can get sunburned over Facetime featuring the soulful tunes of Ray Charles' 'Don't Let the Sun Catch You Crying.'
