= The Goof Who Sat By the Door =

- Atlanta episode
- Episode no.: Season 4 Episode 8
- Directed by: Donald Glover
- Written by: Francesca Sloane; Karen Joseph Adcock
- Cinematography by: Gabriel Patay
- Editing by: Isaac Hagy; Kyle Reiter
- Production code: XAA04009
- Original air date: October 27, 2022
- Running time: 37 minutes

Guest appearances
- Eric Berryman as Thomas Washington; Brian McKnight as himself; Sinbad as himself; J Wortham as themself

Episode chronology
← Previous "Snipe Hunt"	Next → "Andrew Wyeth. Alfred's World."
- Atlanta season 4

"The Goof Who Sat By the Door" is the eighth episode of the fourth season of the American comedy-drama television series Atlanta. It is the 39th overall episode of the series and was written by supervising producer Francesca Sloane and Karen Joseph Adcock, and the final episode directed by series creator and lead actor Donald Glover. It was first broadcast on FX in the United States on October 27, 2022.

None of the main characters of the series appear in this episode. The episode, structured like a documentary, tells the fictional story of Thomas Washington, a Black man who was appointed CEO of The Walt Disney Company and intended to make "the Blackest movie of all time", which would be A Goofy Movie. The title and plot heavily reference Sam Greenlee's novel The Spook Who Sat by the Door, as well as its film adaptation. The storytelling and style strongly resemble the documentary Floyd Norman: An Animated Life about the first black animator at Disney. The manner in which Washington is appointed CEO is also reminiscent of Robert Downey Sr.'s film Putney Swope.

According to Nielsen Media Research, the episode was seen by an estimated 0.190 million household viewers and gained a 0.06 ratings share among adults aged 18–49. The episode was widely praised by critics for Glover's directing, cinematography, writing, social commentary and pacing, with some deeming it one of the series's best episodes.

== Plot ==
The episode is presented as a documentary airing on B.A.N., (Note: The network previously seen in "B.A.N.".) named The Goof Who Sat By the Door: The Thomas Washington Story.

The documentary states that after the 1992 Los Angeles riots, The Walt Disney Company appointed a Black man named Thomas Washington, an animator, as its new CEO. Washington was interested in animation since he was young and studied at the Savannah College of Art and Design, intending to work for Disney. After attending a talk hosted by Art Babbitt, the animator who developed Goofy, Washington started experimenting with animation and was soon hired by Disney. He started as an assistant animator in DuckTales the Movie: Treasure of the Lost Lamp.

During the 1992 riots, Disney's temporary CEO died and the board decided to appoint a white man named Tom Washington. However, due to a misunderstanding in their first names, Thomas Washington wound up being the CEO by mistake. Despite the board's discontent with the decision, they were forced to keep him. Washington highlighted many changes in the company, including questioning why would Mickey Mouse have Pluto as a pet if Goofy is also a dog. He then set out to make "the Blackest movie of all time", which would tackle all subject matter regarding African-American culture, setting A Goofy Movie as the project, even using his son Maxwell, played by Maurice P. Kerry, as the subject of the character Max Goof.

As progress on the movie continues, Washington began to be verbally abusive to his wife and son, which would culminate with their divorce. The Walt Disney Company started to question Washington's leadership, especially as he started exhibiting Goofy's traits, including his laugh. The company offered him $75 million to terminate his contract but he refused. Washington's original ending for A Goofy Movie, in which Goofy and Max were to wander into a thrift store and sit in the seat of civil rights activist/radical Huey P. Newton and/or experience police brutality at a traffic stop as a message to Black audiences, was deemed unsuitable and changed for a new version.

Several employees are questioned as to whether they believe that Washington's death was an accident and it is revealed that there is a tape, which was Washington's last footage before his death. In the tape, Washington lamented the situation with the movie and how he intended to finish it. During a screening of the movie, Washington was disappointed that his original vision was discarded and left the company. Washington's car was discovered in a lake in 1995, the same lake where he took his son to go fishing, but his body was never found. The documentary ends with his widow stating that his impact is still felt to this day, remarking that he managed to make "the Blackest movie of all time".

== Production ==
=== Development ===
"An in depth look at the making of the American Classic A Goofy Movie."

— Official description in the press release for the episode.

In September 2022, FX announced that the eighth episode of the season would be titled "The Goof Who Sat By the Door" and that it would be written by supervising producer Francesca Sloane and Karen Joseph Adcock, and directed by series creator and lead actor Donald Glover. This was Sloane's third writing credit, Adcock's first writing credit, and Glover's ninth directing credit.

=== Writing ===
The episode, structured like a documentary, tells a fictionalized story about Thomas Washington, and his intent on making "the Blackest movie of all time", which would be A Goofy Movie. Okayplayer noted that "The characterization of Goofy has origins that suggest that he's a Black stereotype, opposite of the well-meaning (but possibly white) Mickey Mouse (although it's rumored that the mouse was designed after a minstrel character)", while Vice also published an article on the impact of the movie on the African-American audience.

== Reception ==
=== Viewers ===
The episode was watched by 0.190 million viewers, earning a 0.06 in the 18-49 rating demographics on the Nielson ratings scale. This means that 0.06 percent of all households with televisions watched the episode. This was a 66% increase from the previous episode, which was watched by 0.114 million viewers with a 0.05 in the 18-49 demographics.

=== Critical reviews ===
"The Goof Who Sat By the Door" was praised by critics. The review aggregator website Rotten Tomatoes reported a 100% approval rating, based on five reviews with an average rating of 9.7/10.

Quinci LeGardye of The A.V. Club gave the episode an "A" and writing, "'The Goof Who Sat By The Door' is Atlanta's most daring and thematically-impressive episode yet, as it creates a revisionist history for the Blackest film of the Disney Renaissance."

Alan Sepinwall of Rolling Stone wrote, "It is an impeccable recreation of a certain brand of sociologically-conscious Hollywood biography, blending real-life footage of the 1992 Los Angeles uprising with photographs and video clips of Washington and his family, along with talking-head footage from journalist Jenna Wortham, R&B star Brian McKnight, comedian-actor Sinbad, and a group of actors playing important figures in Thomas Washington's improbable rise and tragic fall. Stylistically, it hits all its marks. It's the substance, though, that makes 'The Goof Who Sat By the Door' spectacular." Sepinwall would later put the episode on his "Top 25 Best TV Episodes of 2022" list, writing "The genius of “The Goof Who Sat by the Door” is that it is, of course, ridiculous, but also somehow feels genuinely tragic, despite the goofy premise. Maybe this is the one that should have been called “The Most Atlanta.”"

Ile-Ife Okantah of Vulture gave the episode a perfect five out of five rating and wrote, "The amount of care that was put into making this seem like a completely plausible documentary will not go unnoticed on my watch. There was the perfect amount of detail, nostalgia, and archival clips from real events and real cartoons. It stretches the absurdity at the perfect points, like finding the Goofy gloves and costume at the crime scene, but stays grounded in reality when necessary, as when drawing connections to real-life events including the riots, making the final product an excellent satire." Christian Hubbard of Full Circle Cinema gave the episode a ten out of ten rating and wrote, "Overall, episode 8 tells a hilarious story that, quite honestly, feels real. So much so that scrolling on Twitter will show fans live-tweeting their reactions asking if this story really happened. With subtle nods to some of the criticism Glover has endured his career, the entire story seems to be an allegory for Glover himself. Moreover, Thomas Washington is a broken man in a broken system, and with the documentary “The Goof Who Sat by the Door”, his story is one that will only further the connection fans have to Glover and, hell, even Goofy."

Kevin Lima, director of A Goofy Movie, expressed surprise and praise for the episode, saying "I sat down and watched it with wide eyes and my jaw on the floor. Like, 'I can't believe they got away with this.'"

TV Guide ranked it the third best episode of the year. Entertainment Weekly included it in its unranked list of "The 33 best TV episodes of 2022".

== See also ==
- Swarm – a miniseries by Glover and Atlanta staff writer Janine Nabers, the penultimate episode of which features a similar documentary-style episode that also blends real life elements with the show’s mythos.
- Not Just a Goof – an official documentary about the making of A Goofy Movie.
