= It Was All a Dream =

It Was All a Dream may refer to:

- A common phrase uttered to describe a dream sequence in storytelling
- It Was All a Dream (Dream album), 2001
- It Was All a Dream (Lil' Keke album), 1999
- "It Was All a Dream" (Atlanta)
- The opening lyric of "Juicy", a rap song by The Notorious B.I.G.
