= Work Ethic! =

- Atlanta episode
- Episode no.: Season 4 Episode 5
- Directed by: Donald Glover
- Written by: Janine Nabers
- Cinematography by: Christian Sprenger
- Editing by: Jen Bryson; Cameron Ross
- Production code: XAA04005
- Original air date: October 6, 2022
- Running time: 29 minutes

Episode chronology
← Previous "Light Skinned-ed"	Next → "Crank Dat Killer"
- Atlanta season 4

"Work Ethic!" is the fifth episode of the fourth season of the American comedy-drama television series Atlanta. It is the 36th overall episode of the series and was written by co-executive producer Janine Nabers, and directed by series creator and main actor Donald Glover. It was first broadcast on FX in the United States on October 6, 2022.

The series is set in Atlanta and follows Earnest "Earn" Marks, as he tries to redeem himself in the eyes of his ex-girlfriend Van, who is also the mother of his daughter Lottie; as well as his parents and his cousin Alfred, who raps under the stage name "Paper Boi"; and Darius, Alfred's eccentric right-hand man. After staying in Europe for a tour during the previous season, the season sees the characters back in Atlanta. In the episode, Van takes Lottie to accompany her to a TV studio run by a private and mysterious person known as "Mr. Chocolate" (who is played by Glover). When Mr. Chocolate takes an interest in using Lottie for more productions, Van sets out to prevent her daughter from being exploited.

According to Nielsen Media Research, the episode was seen by an estimated 177,000 household viewers and gained a 0.05 ratings share among adults aged 18–49. The episode received critical acclaim, with critics praising Zazie Beetz's performance, Glover's directing, writing, character development, humor and social commentary. Critics and viewers analyzed the episode's parody of Tyler Perry, who served as the basis for Mr. Chocolate.

== Plot ==
Van (Zazie Beetz) and Lottie (Austin Elle Fisher) arrive at Chocolate Land, a successful TV studio targeting African American audiences, to film Van's acting debut in a TV series. The studio is run by a person named Kirkwood Chocolate who prefers to be known as "Mr. Chocolate". He is never seen in public, communicating with his production crew through an intercom in the studio. He is also known for quickly finishing his productions, reusing the sets, using the blocking rehearsals as the final cut, and often saying "We'll fix it in post" for any continuity issues.

While rehearsing a scene, Lottie interrupts the scene to say "shut up" when the main actor's character acts mean. Mr. Chocolate, who watches the scene from his private office, is impressed by her acting and demands that they give her a role in the scene and re-write it to accommodate her. While Lottie impresses the cast and crew with her acting ability, Van remains worried about her. Her concerns grow when she realizes that Lottie has been added in 14 more scenes and is being billed as a lead actress.

A studio handyman named Shamik (Xaveria Baird) helps Van in locating Lottie, but by the time she shows up Lottie has already left for another stage. After Van narrowly misses Lottie despite arriving in time to watch her film a scene, she asks for help from security, but realizes the security guards also work multiple jobs such as being production interns. Frustrated, she faces an intercom, telling Mr. Chocolate that she wants her daughter back; after a brief pause, the intercom replies "no". Angry, she decides to face Mr. Chocolate at his office, but she's blocked by his security guards. An older, maternal member of staff decides to help Van, shocking her by taking out a gun and shooting one of the guards in the foot, before the other guard reveals that their M16 rifles are props. Van enters Mr. Chocolate's building, where she climbs a ladder after passing through a dark room.

Van eventually reaches his office and meets Mr. Chocolate (Donald Glover). He reveals that he writes scripts through a piano-typewriter made by Steve Jobs and he runs the studio without a concrete plan, having the shows use plots or lines that don't add to the narrative, aware that his target audience will consume anything he does no matter how bad it is. When Lottie shows up at the office, Mr. Chocolate claims to know Van, showing footage of her throughout the day. He points out that she fell into the character tropes he writes into his shows, calling her a "Kirkwood Chocolate woman". He then offers Lottie the choice to star in a children's show for 6 seasons, which he claims would make her financially stable until she is 20 years old. Lottie wants to accept the offer, but Van refuses to let her be exploited by Mr. Chocolate and she forces her way out.

Back home, Van laments ruining Lottie's fun at the studio, but claims that she wants her to choose what she represents when she is old enough, rather than have Mr. Chocolate do it for her. Lottie then embraces her mother and leaves for her room. Van notices that Shamik put a note on the back of the business card he handed her, saying they should meet for sex in a boiler room. She sighs and prepares to make mac and cheese for Lottie.

== Production ==
=== Development ===
"One time I was gonna be an extra on this TV show but then they started asking me about Social Security numbers and taxes and being up there at 5am. I know y'all ain't doing that with Taraji."

— Official description in the press release for the episode.

In September 2022, FX announced that the fifth episode of the season would be titled "Work Ethic!" and that it would be written by co-executive producer Janine Nabers and directed by series creator and main actor Donald Glover. This was Nabers' second writing credit, and Glover's eighth directing credit.

=== Writing ===
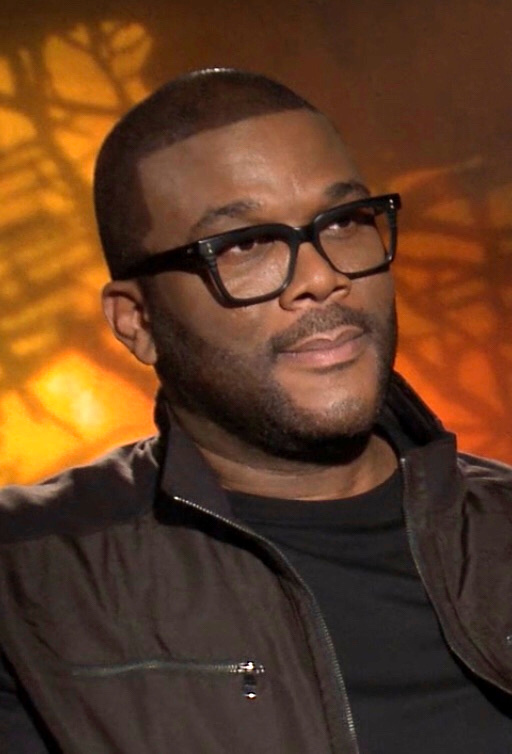
Tyler Perry serves as the basis of the character, "Mr. Chocolate".

The episode lampoons actor and filmmaker Tyler Perry, who is used as basis for the character "Mr. Chocolate". Critics saw similarities in the episode, such as Perry's studio in Atlanta, emphasis on an African-American audience, rushed filming schedule, over-use of wigs, certain character tropes, and Perry publicly admitting to writing multiple scripts all by himself without a writers' room. Alan Sepinwall viewed Mr. Chocolate as "Tyler Perry by way of the Wizard of Oz", describing him as "an enigmatic, heard-but-not-seen figure who churns out product in ways that simultaneously seem rushed, ludicrous, and inscrutable."

Writer Janine Nabers explained that while the character resembles Perry, it is also used to represent other producers, "There's an aesthetic when it comes to Black folk and art that I think some people really double down on. I think Mr. Chocolate is not just one person. [...] He represents many different people in Hollywood that kind of have this similar aesthetic of Blackness and art and the stories that we tell and what resonates with being a compelling Black story or a real Black story."

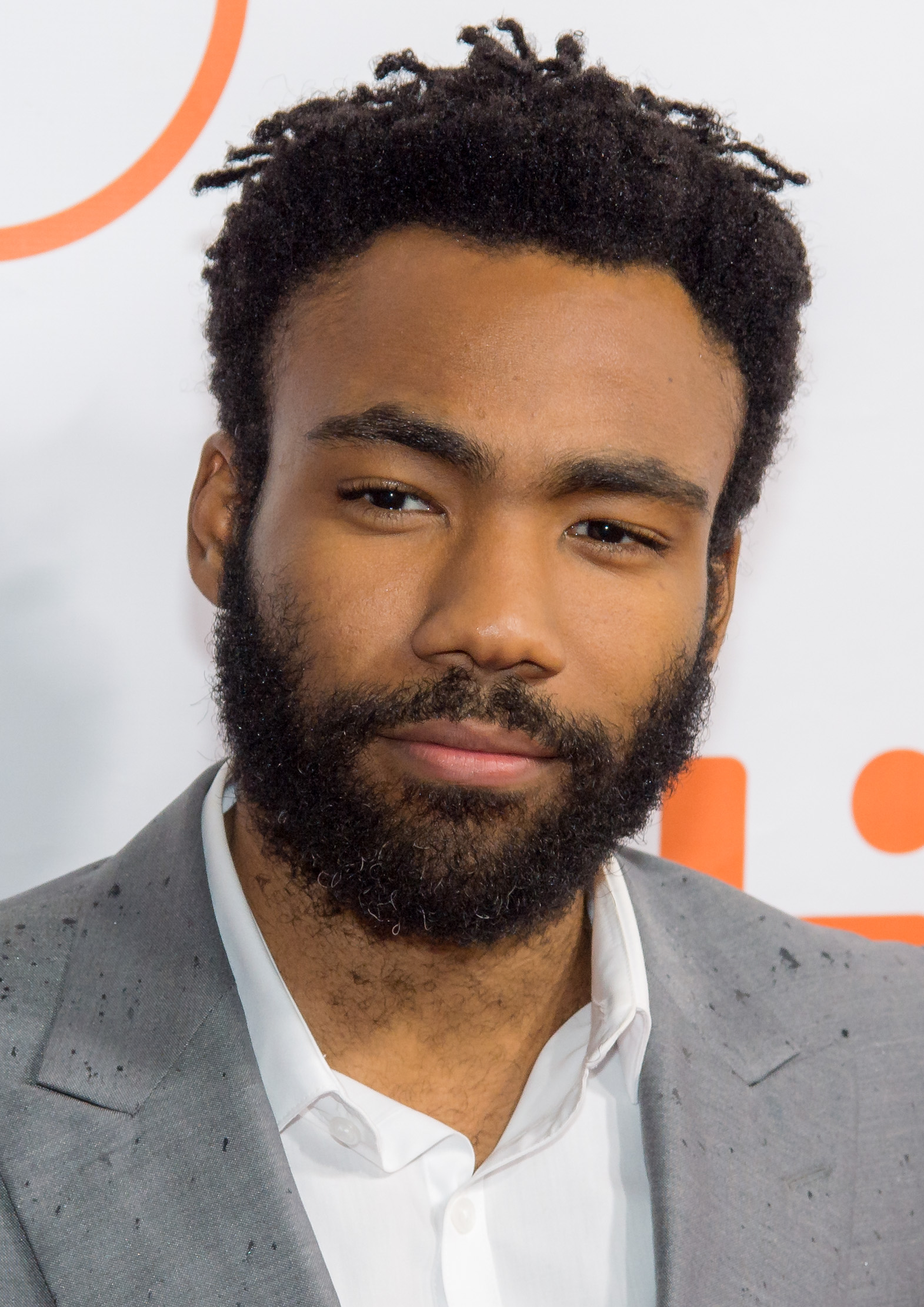
Series creator and main actor Donald Glover portrays "Mr. Chocolate" in the episode.

Complex Networks interpreted the episode as "a commentary on the concept of Black art, and what makes it 'good' or 'bad'. Although people like Earn and Van might not enjoy the content Mr. Chocolate creates, there are millions of people who do. It still doesn't ever feel like the episode's intention is to poke fun at or ridicule but more so to examine people like Mr. Chocolate and his intentions, giving a full scope of what this kind of person represents to everyone. The filmmaker is exploitative to an extent and has amassed his wealth by feeding into stereotypes, but in many ways, he is also providing opportunities for thousands of people who may have been overlooked in life and in Hollywood and giving them a solid starting point."

=== Casting ===
The character of Mr. Chocolate is played in the episode by Donald Glover, who serves as the series creator and main actor of the series, through prosthethic make-up. Besides playing Earn, Glover previously portrayed the title character in the episode "Teddy Perkins". Glover went uncredited in the episode's credits as the actor playing Mr. Chocolate.

== Reception ==
=== Viewers ===
The episode was watched by 0.117 million viewers, earning a 0.05 in the 18-49 rating demographics on the Nielson ratings scale. This means that 0.05 percent of all households with televisions watched the episode. This was a slight decrease from the previous episode, which was watched by 0.147 million viewers with a 0.04 in the 18-49 demographics.

=== Critical reviews ===
"Work Ethic!" received critical acclaim. The review aggregator website Rotten Tomatoes reported a 100% approval rating, based on 5 reviews with an average rating of 9/10.

Quinci LeGardye of The A.V. Club gave the episode an "A-" and writing, "I never expected to parse out the ethics of Tyler Perry in an Atlanta review during my writing career, but that's because I didn't know I would get the chance to recap this show. An examination of Supporting All Black Art is right in Atlanta's wheelhouse as a show that points out the intricacies and eccentricities of being Black in America. With 'Work Ethic!' Donald Glover produced another self-contained psychological horror starring Van as she enters the world of the mysterious Mr. Chocolate."

Alan Sepinwall of Rolling Stone wrote, "'Work Ethic!' is not nearly as tragic as 'Teddy Perkins', but it's nonetheless satirizing a huge figure in Black popular culture, so into disguise Glover once again goes as the Tyler Perry-esque Kirkwood Chocolate."

Ile-Ife Okantah of Vulture gave the episode a perfect 5 star rating out of 5 and wrote, "In tonight's Atlanta, Donald Glover presents his own parody of Tyler Perry through Van's chaotic day at Mr. Chocolate Studios, which sounds more like an amusement park than a movie studio." Christian Hubbard of Full Circle Cinema gave the episode a perfect 10 out of 10 rating and wrote, "I may be biased due to being a massive Zazie Beetz fan, but episode 5 is the best from an already solid season. This installment's stakes and mystery were extremely satisfying and peeled back many layers to Van's character growth and her renewed commitment to Lottie full-time. If season four is the show's swan song, this is the perfect way to discover who Van truly is as a mother and as a fully fleshed-out main character in this series."
