= Dominique Fishback =

American actress

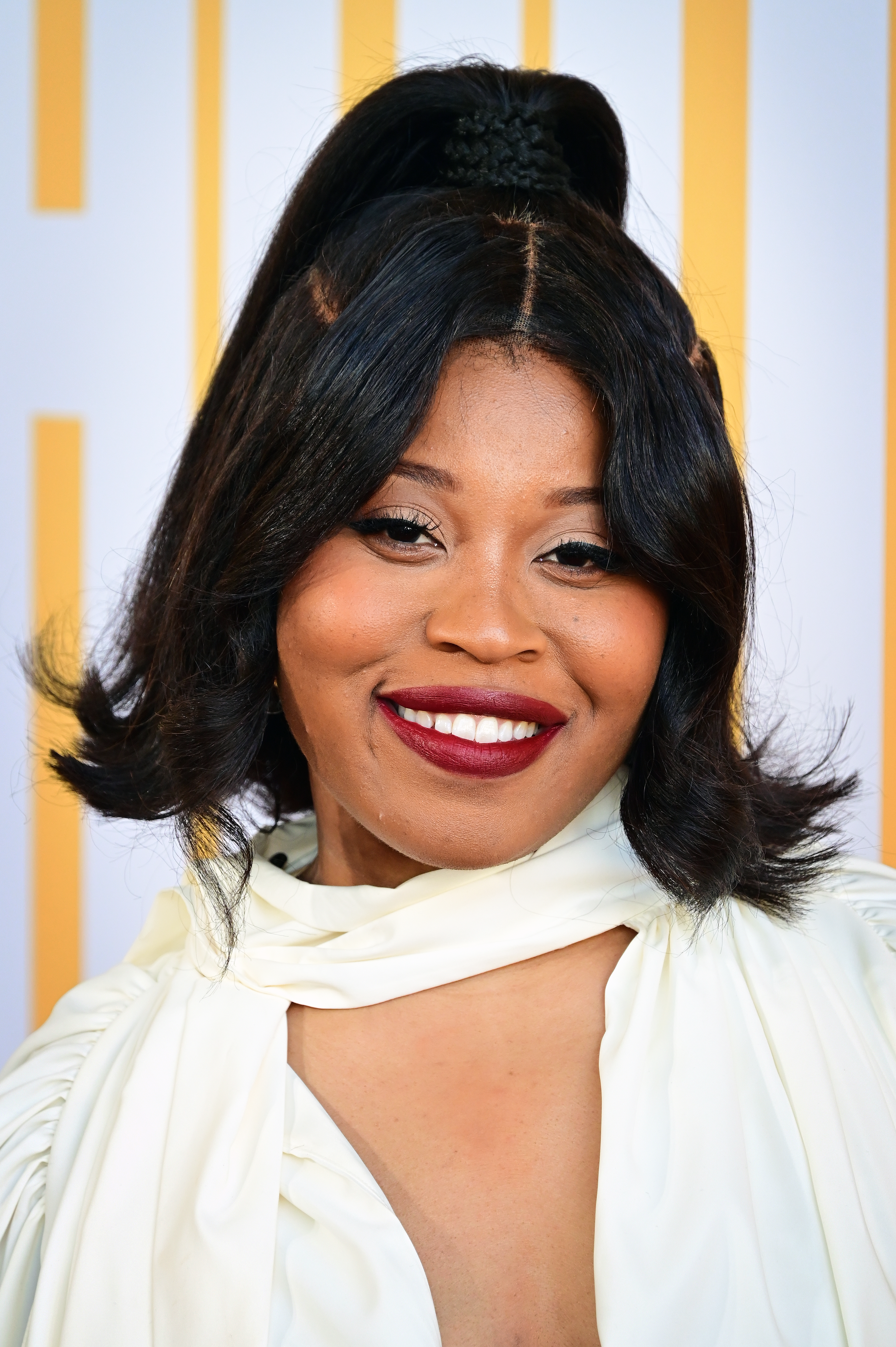
- Fishback in 2026
- Born: March 22, 1991 (age 35); Brooklyn, New York City, U.S.
- Education: Pace University (BA)
- Occupation: Actress
- Years active: 2013–present

Dominique Fishback (born March 22, 1991) is an American actress. She played Billie Rowan on Show Me a Hero, Darlene on The Deuce, and Deborah Johnson in Judas and the Black Messiah, the latter of which earned nominations for a Critics' Choice Movie Award, and a BAFTA Award for Best Actress in a Supporting Role. In 2023, she began starring in the Amazon Prime Video psychological horror series Swarm; her performance in the series has received universal praise, earning her a nomination for Outstanding Lead Actress in a Limited or Anthology Series or Movie at the 75th Primetime Emmy Awards.

== Early life and education ==
Fishback first became interested in acting around the age of 10. She graduated from Pace University with a B.A. in Theater in 2013. While in college, she learned American Sign Language.

== Career ==
In 2014, Fishback premiered her off-off-Broadway play Subverted, in which she played twenty two characters. Subverted was nominated for a 2015 Innovative Theater Award for Outstanding Solo Performance. Fishback's first major recurring role was in the Yonkers housing drama Show Me a Hero as single mother Billie Rowan. In 2016, Abingdon Theatre Company announced Fishback as one of the recipients of its inaugural Residency Program.

Her first series regular role was in the 1970s Times Square drama The Deuce. Fishback has been noted as one of the standouts in the show due to her performance as the "sweetly vulnerable" prostitute Darlene. Co-creator David Simon has noted her strengths as an actress in playing Darlene. For her role on The Deuce, Fishback was listed by USA Today as one of "5 faces you should be watching on fall TV" in 2017.

In December 2017, Fishback appeared as a younger version of Gloria Carter, the mother of Jay-Z, in the music video for his song "Smile." Her first film, Night Comes On, premiered at the 2018 Sundance Film Festival. She also played the part of Kenya in the 2018 film The Hate U Give, which is based on the popular young adult book.

Fishback plays a street-smart teenager in Project Power, which was released by Netflix on August 14, 2020. In 2021, she starred in Judas and the Black Messiah as Deborah Johnson, the partner of Fred Hampton. In 2023, she starred in Transformers: Rise of the Beasts, the sequel to Bumblebee.

In 2026, she is set to appear as a performer in the Off-Broadway revival of Whoopi Goldberg's The Whoopi Monologues at Lincoln Center Theatre. Directed by Whitney White she will star alongside Kerry Washington, Kara Young, Danielle Pinnock and Kecia Lewis.

== Filmography ==
=== Film ===
Year	Title	Role	Notes
2018	Night Comes On	Angel Lamere	
2018	The Hate U Give	Kenya	
2020	Project Power	Robin Reilly	
2021	Judas and the Black Messiah	Deborah Johnson	
2023	Transformers: Rise of the Beasts	Elena Wallace	

=== Television ===
Year	Title	Role	Notes
2013	The Knick	Woman	Episode: "The Busy Flea"
2014	The Affair	Keisha	Episode "8"
2015	The Americans	Nicole	Episode: "Dimebag"
2015	Blue Bloods	Charelle Tyler	Episode: "Through the Looking Glass"
2015	Royal Pains	Elan	Episodes: "Lending a Shoulder" and "The Prince of Nucleotides"
2015	Show Me a Hero	Billie Rowan	Recurring character; 4 episodes
2017–2019	The Deuce	Darlene	Series regular
2018	Random Acts of Flyness	Najja	Recurring character; 4 episodes
2021	Modern Love	Lilian "Lil" Parker	Episode: "A Life Plan for Two, Followed By One"
2022	The Last Days of Ptolemy Grey	Robyn	Main role
2022–2023	The Proud Family: Louder and Prouder	Young Charlette “Suga Mama” Towne-Proud (voice)	2 episodes
2023	Swarm	Andrea "Dre" Greene	Lead role; also producer

== Awards and nominations ==
Year	Award	Category	Nominated Work	Result	Ref.
2021	NAACP Image Awards	Outstanding Breakthrough Performance in a Motion Picture	Project Power	Nominated	
2021	African-American Film Critics Association Awards	Best Supporting Actress	Judas and the Black Messiah	Won	
2021	Black Reel Awards	Outstanding Supporting Actress	Judas and the Black Messiah	Won	
2021	Black Reel Awards	Outstanding Breakthrough Performance, Female	Judas and the Black Messiah	Nominated	
2021	British Academy Film Awards	Best Actress in a Supporting Role	Judas and the Black Messiah	Nominated	
2021	Critics' Choice Awards	Best Acting Ensemble	Judas and the Black Messiah	Nominated	
2021	Washington DC Area Film Critics Association	Best Supporting Actress	Judas and the Black Messiah	Nominated	
2022	NAACP Image Awards	Outstanding Supporting Actress in a Motion Picture	Judas and the Black Messiah	Nominated	
2023	Television Critics Association Awards	Individual Achievement in Drama	Swarm	Nominated	
2023	Primetime Emmy Awards	Outstanding Lead Actress in a Limited or Anthology Series or Movie	Swarm	Nominated	
2024	Black Reel Television Awards	Outstanding Lead Performance, TV Movie/Limited Series	Swarm	Won	
2024	Independent Spirit Awards	Best Lead Performance in a New Scripted Series	Swarm	Nominated	
2024	NAACP Image Awards	Outstanding Actress in a Television Movie, Mini-Series or Dramatic Special	Swarm	Nominated	
