= The Homeliest Little Horse =

- Atlanta episode
- Episode no.: Season 4 Episode 2
- Directed by: Angela Barnes
- Written by: Ibra Ake
- Cinematography by: Christian Sprenger
- Editing by: Isaac Hagy
- Production code: XAA04003
- Original air date: September 15, 2022
- Running time: 32 minutes

Guest appearances
- Brooke Bloom as Lisa Mahn; Khris Davis as Tracy; Sullivan Jones as Everette Tillman

Episode chronology
← Previous "The Most Atlanta"	Next → "Born 2 Die"
- Atlanta season 4

"The Homeliest Little Horse" is the second episode of the fourth season of the American comedy-drama television series Atlanta. It is the 33rd overall episode of the series and was written by supervising producer Ibra Ake, and directed by Angela Barnes. It was first broadcast on FX in the United States on September 15, 2022, airing back-to-back with the previous episode, "The Most Atlanta".

The series is set in Atlanta and follows Earnest "Earn" Marks, as he tries to redeem himself in the eyes of his ex-girlfriend Van, who is also the mother of his daughter Lottie; as well as his parents and his cousin Alfred, who raps under the stage name "Paper Boi"; and Darius, Alfred's eccentric right-hand man. After staying in Europe for a tour during the previous season, the season sees the characters back in Atlanta. In the episode, Earn starts attending therapy sessions, where he delves into his past at Princeton University. In a subplot, an aspiring children's book author named Lisa gets an opportunity to finally become famous.

According to Nielsen Media Research, the episode was seen by an estimated 0.126 million household viewers and gained a 0.1 ratings share among adults aged 18–49. The episode received critical acclaim, with critics praising Glover's performance, character development, writing and its ending.

== Plot ==
A woman named Lisa Mahn (Brooke Bloom) receives an e-mail from a person named Gordon Rosenbaum. It states that a manuscript written by her was reviewed, and he wants to meet with her. She is thrilled by this. Meanwhile, Earn (Donald Glover) drives his car while talking to Alfred (Brian Tyree Henry) on the phone, saying he is attending therapy. Alfred laughs at the thought of spending his money on therapy.

At the therapy session, Earn is reprimanded for constantly using his phone and not opening up more about himself. The psychiatrist, Everette Tillman (Sullivan Jones), convinces him to talk about his feelings and trust issues, with their conversation even revealing that Earn was abused by a family member. Earn also reveals that Princeton University, from which he dropped out, wants him to speak as an alumni at a seminar and receive an honorary degree, which he refuses as he thinks they are profiting off him. Meanwhile, Lisa goes to a literary agency, where she meets Rosenbaum and his secretary, revealed to be Tracy (Khris Davis). Impressed by her children's books, Rosenbaum agrees to be her agent but reveals they are on a deadline and begins preparing her to read part of her book at a library. While eating lunch with her best friend, Lisa reveals that she quit her job to fully focus on being an author. While her friend is happy for her, she states she can't keep loaning her money due to other bills, prompting an angry Lisa to leave.

During the next therapy session, Earn talks more about Princeton, revealing that he had a close friend named Sasha and both were RAs. Earn was preparing for a job interview when his crush asked him to come with her to a party, with Sasha agreeing to keep his suit for the interview when he comes back. When Earn returned, he texted Sasha about his suit, but she didn't respond for hours until she said she was not around. Desperate as the interview was nearing, Earn used his master key to enter her dorm room and get the suit. Sasha was angry and informed the Dean, with the incident quickly spreading across college and ruining Earn's reputation. As Earn breaks down, he says that he never talked to Sasha again and when he left Princeton, he set out to "prove everyone wrong". Tillman concludes that by not going back, he is proving something to Sasha but not to himself and draws a parallel between Sasha's breaking his trust in her and the abuse that an unspecified family member inflicted on Earn.

During another therapy session, Tillman gives Earn a floor pillow as a gift as he prefers to lay on the ground during their sessions. Earn states that after re-considering, he agreed with the idea of the Princeton offer. However, after confirming his attendance, he planned to go with Van and Lottie but when they were at the airport, he got into a conflict with an airport employee who denied their entry due to his passport being worn out, though Earn knew it was due to racial profiling. Another employee helped them in getting past the inspection, but TSA officers intercepted them when they were nearing the gate, prompting Earn to just give up and not go. He is less disappointed with the thought of missing Princeton and more on how he wasted time and wasn't able to connect with Van and Lottie. He decides to take some time off from therapy to which Tillman agrees.

Lisa arrives at the library with a new makeover, but the librarian forces her to leave her service dog outside despite having the approved paperwork. As she begins reading her book "The Homeliest Little Horse", the kids mock her story and most of them leave the reading, forcing a devastated Lisa to read the book in a near empty room while being filmed. At a bar, Earn meets with Alfred and Darius (Lakeith Stanfield) while the screen shows Lisa at the reading. He reveals that Lisa was the airport employee who ruined his trip and that he orchestrated the reading by paying actors (including Tracy) to ruin her life and humiliate her. Alfred and Darius seem unimpressed with his actions. As Earn stays alone to drink, he watches some footage of Lisa crying. He smiles but then concludes that he should go back to therapy.

== Production ==
=== Development ===
"We got grown men out here being this petty. Y'all really need therapy. I don't cuz I already know what's wrong with me."

— Official description in the press release for the episode.

In August 2022, FX announced that the second episode of the season would be titled "The Homeliest Little Horse" and that it would be written by supervising producer Ibra Ake and directed by Angela Barnes. This was Ake's third writing credit, and Barnes' first directing credit on the series.

=== Writing ===
Okayplayer saw comparisons in the episode to the third season episode, "Trini 2 De Bone" on the topic of the whiteness theory, using the character of Lisa as an exploration of the theme.

The episode delved into Earn's past, explaining the reason behind dropping out of Princeton University, an event that has been alluded since the series' debut. Consequence explained, "The conversation reveals the ongoing struggle with which Earn continues to wrestle, a battle between trying to prove himself and not letting other people's doubt consume him, and his therapist helps him unpack the way childhood trauma and racial trauma in his adulthood have informed his choices more than he's aware of."

== Reception ==
=== Viewers ===
The episode was watched by 0.126 million viewers, earning a 0.1 in the 18-49 rating demographics on the Nielson ratings scale. This means that 0.1 percent of all households with televisions watched the episode. This was a 42% decrease from the previous episode, which was watched by 0.216 million viewers with a 0.1 in the 18-49 demographics.

=== Critical reviews ===
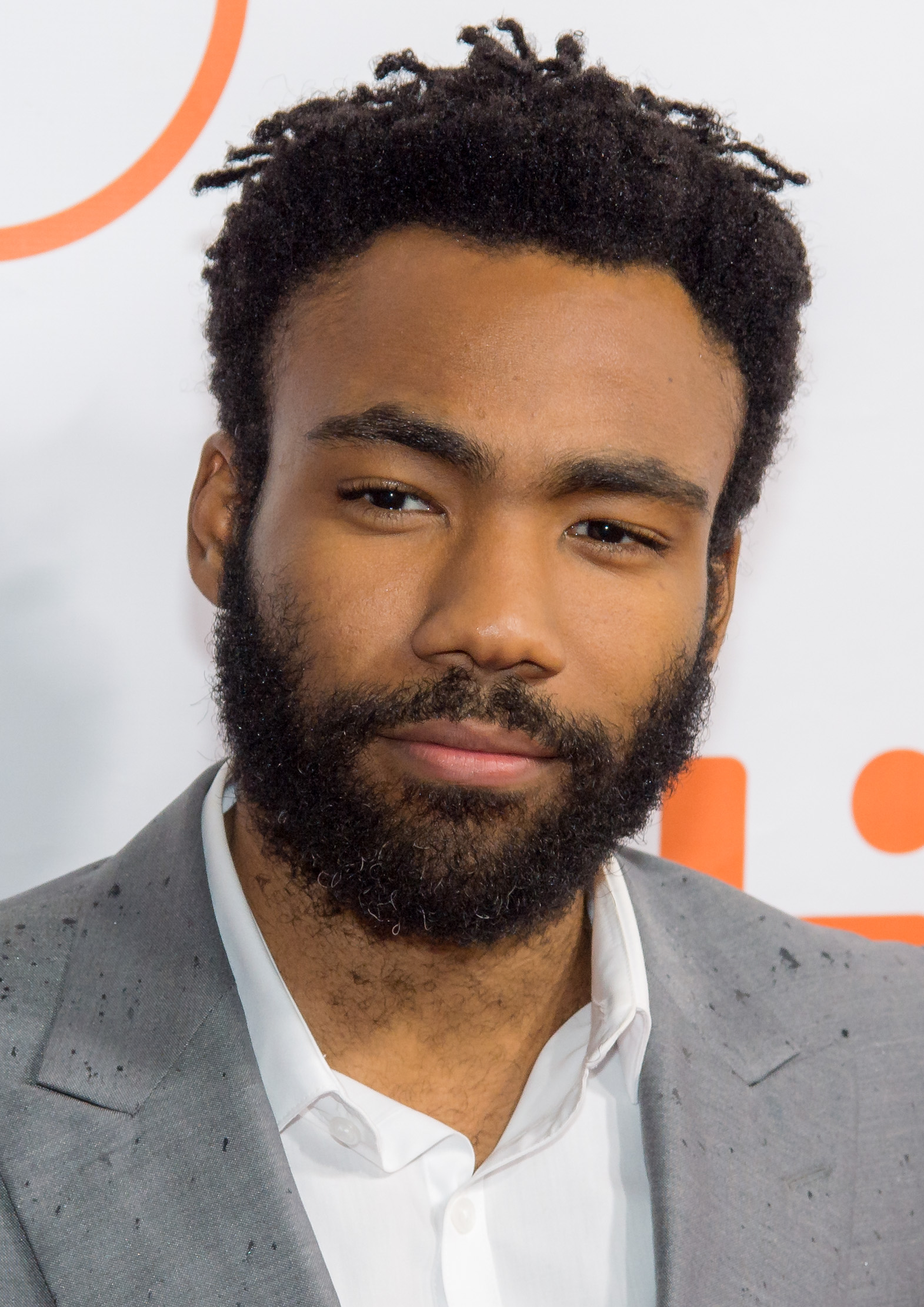
Donald Glover's performance in the episode received acclaim from critics.

"The Homeliest Little Horse" received critical acclaim. The review aggregator website Rotten Tomatoes reported a 95% approval rating with an average rating of 8.5/10 for the episode, based on 21 reviews. The site's consensus states: "A more melancholy installment than the premiere, 'The Homeliest Little Horse' recalls the flipside of what Atlanta does best: examining wayward characters with empathetic but unsentimental insight."

Quinci LeGardye of The A.V. Club gave the episode an "A-" and writing, "If the first episode went classic Atlanta, 'The Homeliest Little Horse' displays how the series — and Glover's performance — have evolved. If I heard at any point in season one that a later episode would revolve around a therapy session, I'd have responded with a healthy dose of skepticism. This exploration into Earn's self-professed love of pettiness comes at a perfect time in the series and not just because it answers questions about Earn's motivations that fans have held since 2016. It feels warranted instead of navel-gazey, and this show has always been about the slow game."

Alan Sepinwall of Rolling Stone wrote, "'The Homeliest Little Horse' is deliberately much less joyful. Half of it is Earn in therapy, working through his anxiety and past disappointments like getting expelled from Princeton. And the other half starts out as what seems like another anthology story, this one just folded in as the B-plot in an episode otherwise focusing on one of the regulars. But the two eventually connect in ways that explain why we have been spending so much time with would-be children's book author Lisa, and reveal just how badly Earn needs to continue his therapy." Ile-Ife Okantah of Vulture gave the episode a 4 star rating out of 5 and wrote, "Coming back to Atlanta is the perfect and most obvious way to begin such a bittersweet ending, bringing the characters and actors back to where it all started. Atlanta is at its best when exploring themes of race, power, and culture through the core characters, and it's hard to capture that outside of, well, Atlanta."

Alison Herman of The Ringer wrote, "By returning to its home turf, Atlanta sets up an easy, simple narrative: by going back to the place and people it knows, the show goes back to the humor and storytelling that made it a phenomenon. But if there's any show that resists simple narratives, it's Atlanta, which avoids linear plotting like the plague. So it's fitting that the reality is a bit more nuanced." Jeremy Mathai of /Film wrote, "The inexplicable oddities, slice-of-life tangents, celebrity cameos, and unsettling blend between reality and the surreal threaded throughout each prior season remained present and accounted for... thankfully, all of which is back and bolder than ever before in season 4." Kyndall Cunningham of The Daily Beast wrote, "By episodes 2 and 3, the show is back in full-swing and firing on all cylinders. In 'The Homeliest Little Horse', Earn starts seeing a therapist in probably the most main-character moment he's had throughout the show, which often doesn't explore his psyche beyond his exhausted facial expressions."

=== Accolades ===
TVLine named Donald Glover as an honorable mention as the "Performer of the Week" for the week of September 17, 2022, for his performance in the episode. The site wrote, "He recalled getting kicked out of college after being accused of breaking into another student's dorm room — and also revealed he was abused as a child — and Glover showed more emotion in that scene than we've seen from him in four seasons, breaking down in long-pent-up sobs. Glover also had a frightening glint in his eye when we learned Earn had pulled an elaborate revenge prank on an airport employee who unfairly hassled him, adding another complex (and not entirely admirable) layer to Earn's personality. Glover has always been the main creative force behind Atlanta's genius, and it's nice to see him get a proper spotlight on screen as well."

Decider included "The Homeliest Little Horse" in its list of "The Best TV Episodes of 2022" and wrote, "the episode is vintage Atlanta — and by that I mean a sprawling, expertly crafted story that’s as unpredictable as it is immensely satisfying."
