= Light Skinned-ed =

- Atlanta episode
- Episode no.: Season 4 Episode 4
- Directed by: Hiro Murai
- Written by: Stefani Robinson
- Cinematography by: Christian Sprenger
- Editing by: Isaac Hagy
- Production code: XAA04004
- Original air date: September 29, 2022
- Running time: 26 minutes

Guest appearances
- Michole Briana White as Jeanie; Myra Lucretia Taylor as Gloria Marks; Katt Williams as Willie; Isiah Whitlock Jr. as Raleigh Marks; Tatiana Neva as Lisa; Gunna as himself

Episode chronology
← Previous "Born 2 Die"	Next → "Work Ethic!"
- Atlanta season 4

"Light Skinned-ed" is the fourth episode of the fourth season of the American comedy-drama television series Atlanta. It is the 35th overall episode of the series and was written by executive producer Stefani Robinson, and directed by executive producer Hiro Murai. It was first broadcast on FX in the United States on September 29, 2022.

The series is set in Atlanta and follows Earnest "Earn" Marks, as he tries to redeem himself in the eyes of his ex-girlfriend Van, who is also the mother of his daughter Lottie; as well as his parents and his cousin Alfred, who raps under the stage name "Paper Boi"; and Darius, Alfred's eccentric right-hand man. After staying in Europe for a tour during the previous season, the season sees the characters back in Atlanta. In the episode, Earn is stuck in a situation where his aunt accuses him and Alfred of conspiring with Earn's mother in kidnapping his grandfather. Meanwhile, Earn's father spends time at the mall before the post-church crowd arrives.

According to Nielsen Media Research, the episode was seen by an estimated 0.147 million household viewers and gained a 0.05 ratings share among adults aged 18–49. The episode received critical acclaim, with critics praising the episode's humor, performances, character development and directing.

== Plot ==
Earn (Donald Glover) leaves with his mother Gloria (Myra Lucretia Taylor) for church, while his father Raleigh (Isiah Whitlock Jr.) chooses to skip attending, intending to go to the mall to buy a phone before the post-church crowd arrives. While driving, Gloria tells Earn that she is at odds with his aunt Jeanie (Michole Briana White) for the treatment of his grandfather (Bob Banks) and considers "stealing him" from her. After leaving Earn and Jeanie at church, Gloria speeds away in the car with his grandfather.

Earn calls Raleigh for advice, but he is not interested in helping, stating that he wants to spend his hours staying at a near-empty mall before more people come. Earn tries to leave Jeanie alone but he is caught, and she accuses him of conspiring with Gloria in taking away his grandfather. Earn claims he is leaving for a studio session with Alfred (Brian Tyree Henry), so Jeanie leaves with him. She confronts them at the studio and then makes a collective phone call between Gloria, and her siblings Pearl (Teresa L. Graves) and Willie (Katt Williams) about the situation, accusing the whole family of hating her for being light-skinned, which is met with laughter from Pearl and Willie. When she claims that Gloria took her father because he forgot about her, Gloria just hangs up while Pearl and Willie condemn her, saying they don't like her as she is "evil".

At the mall, Raleigh is convinced by an employee to try some hats on; she further convinces him that his appearance impresses her so much that she lets him buy a hat that is supposedly not for sale yet. However, the time spent at the stand makes him lose track and he realizes that the mall is now packed with more people. As he walks through the mall, a boy mocks him for the hat, calling him an old Prince. The boy then asks for a picture and even begs on his knees in front of the mall, forcing an embarrassed Raleigh to comply with his request.

Jeanie calls the cops to help her with Gloria, claiming she kidnapped their father. The cops call Gloria, who passes the phone to her father for a wellness check. He claims to know where he is and with who, but then claims he is in Egypt and has been there for a few weeks before Gloria hangs up the phone. As the cops prepare to leave despite Jeanie's insistence, Earn and Alfred escape the studio through a door designed by Bobby Shmurda. Even though the door is right in front of Jeanie, Earn and Alfred evade her by simply not looking back at her. That night, they dine with Gloria, Raleigh and their grandfather at a restaurant. When Gloria requests bread to go, the waiter says he will need to check with his manager first, making a furious Raleigh demand that he bring them the bread. Raleigh laments the disrespect that young people have for them, before suggesting they could watch a movie from Redbox, to which the grandfather happily accepts.

== Production ==
=== Development ===
"My family is so crazy we need our own reality TV show. How you still got beef from the 70's? Whew. And y'all need to stop flirting with people's daddy."

— Official description in the press release for the episode.

In September 2022, FX announced that the fourth episode of the season would be titled "Light Skinned-ed" and that it would be written by executive producer Stefani Robinson and directed by executive producer Hiro Murai. This was Robinson's sixth writing credit, and Murai's 22nd directing credit.

== Reception ==
=== Viewers ===
The episode was watched by 0.147 million viewers, earning a 0.05 in the 18-49 rating demographics on the Nielson ratings scale. This means that 0.0 percent of all households with televisions watched the episode. This was a slight decrease from the previous episode, which was watched by 0.174 million viewers with a 0.04 in the 18-49 demographics.

=== Critical reviews ===
"Light Skinned-ed" received critical acclaim. The review aggregator website Rotten Tomatoes reported a 100% approval rating, based on six reviews, with an average rating of 9.3/10.

Quinci LeGardye of The A.V. Club gave the episode an "A" and writing, "You could say this is Atlanta's best example of a 'normal' episode, which is also expertly written and directed, hilarious and cutting, lovely and minute, and an overall fantastic television episode."

Alan Sepinwall of Rolling Stone wrote, "Interestingly, all four episodes so far this season have brought their various subplots together at the end, when in seasons past, an Al plot might exist entirely separately from what Darius or Earn is up to. Perhaps this is also related to actor availability — if you have certain people for an episode, you may as well find a way to unite them before you're done — if it's not just a coincidence. Or maybe as Robinson, Murai, and everyone else prepares to say goodbye to this show, they not only want to bring actors like Whitlock and Taylor back for well-deserved and funny curtain calls, but to illustrate how intertwined everyone's life here is with everyone else's." Ile-Ife Okantah of Vulture gave the episode a 4 star rating out of 5 and wrote, "As much as I enjoyed this episode, I felt it was a missed opportunity to rectify some of the criticism Atlanta has received about its depiction of Black women, especially since Atlanta's sole female writer wrote it."

Ben Travers of IndieWire gave the episode an "A" grade and wrote, "'Light Skinned-ed' draws curious parallels between Earn and Raleigh, especially in their ongoing quests for respect, but that's a conversation for another time. Episode 4 ends like it began: on a laugh. Everyone is going to watch a Redbox tonight — much to Grandpa's delight — while passing around their free basket of bread. Gloria got her dad back, Raleigh got his new phone, Earn spent time with his folks. For the Marks family, all's well that ends well. For the Atlanta audience, Episode 4 is a damn good time all the way through. More please." Christian Hubbard of Full Circle Cinema gave the episode a perfect 10 out of 10 rating and wrote, "Over the past five years, Atlanta has tried to be a lot of things. Tonight, in this episode, they achieved all of them. Throughout its seemingly short 38-minute runtime, episode 4 not only establishes a familial bond between the show's main characters, but also allows the viewers to see how they become the men they are today. If season four of Atlanta wanted to create an all-time run at the crown for the best show on television, this is its last chance. And they are currently creating an all-time run at the crown for the best show on television."

IndieWire ranked "Light Skinned-ed" the 16th best TV episode of the year.
