= Born 2 Die (Atlanta) =

- Atlanta episode
- Episode no.: Season 4 Episode 3
- Directed by: Adamma Ebo
- Written by: Jamal Olori
- Cinematography by: Christian Sprenger
- Editing by: Kyle Reiter
- Production code: XAA04002
- Original air date: September 22, 2022
- Running time: 31 minutes

Guest appearances
- Charles Malik Whitfield as Bunk; Daniel Rashid as Benny

Episode chronology
← Previous "The Homeliest Little Horse"	Next → "Light Skinned-ed"
- Atlanta season 4

"Born 2 Die" is the third episode of the fourth season of the American comedy-drama television series Atlanta. It is the 34th overall episode of the series and was written by supervising producer Jamal Olori, and directed by Adamma Ebo. It was first broadcast on FX in the United States on September 22, 2022.

The series is set in Atlanta and follows Earnest "Earn" Marks, as he tries to redeem himself in the eyes of his ex-girlfriend Van, who is also the mother of his daughter Lottie; as well as his parents and his cousin Alfred, who raps under the stage name "Paper Boi"; and Darius, Alfred's eccentric right-hand man. After staying in Europe for a tour during the previous season, the season sees the characters back in Atlanta. In the episode, Earn tries to sign D'Angelo as a client but wanders into a surrealistic scenario. Meanwhile, Alfred meets with some businessmen who provide him with a key to stay relevant.

According to Nielsen Media Research, the episode was seen by an estimated 0.174 million household viewers and gained a 0.04 ratings share among adults aged 18–49. The episode received extremely positive reviews from critics, who praised the performances, writing, visual style and social commentary.

== Plot ==
After a performance at a bar mitzvah, Alfred (Brian Tyree Henry) is approached by a man who was impressed by him. He wants Alfred to help his son become more like him. Alfred refuses, but when the man offers $1 million, he reluctantly accepts.

Earn (Donald Glover) has found a new job at a management company and is frustrated by the clients that the company wants to focus entirely on, such as a white woman pulling a gun on a black teenager who knocked at her door. Unwilling to work on the case, he suggests he could sign D'Angelo as a client and despite his boss's reluctance, he is allowed to try it. Using his contacts, he is led to a Rally's, where he discovers a restroom with the label "D'Angelo" etched on the door. He enters and discovers a desolate room with a man seated in a chair, deemed the "waiting area".

Alfred meets with the man's son, Benny (Daniel Rashid), at a record booth. However, Benny is not particularly interested in Alfred, preferring to work with other young artists. As he stays in the booth, Alfred meets with a man named Bunk (Charles Malik Whitfield), who convinces Alfred to join him in a group named YWA. Alfred attends a meeting, hearing their leader explain that black artists don't stand much of a chance against white artists in terms of success, also revealing that "YWA" stands for "Young White Avatar" and their main purpose is to collaborate with white artists behind their success to stay relevant. Alfred is unconvinced by the idea, until they highlight how old he is compared to the new talent and that the crew at the record booth didn't even recognize him. Taking the advice, Alfred approaches Benny about working as his manager but finds that he already signed with Bunk.

Earn waits in the room for several days, and is frustrated that his only water supply consists of Dasani water bottles. He eventually concludes what the guard wants and says "let me experience D'Angelo". The guard then opens a tunnel and Earn crawls through it until he reaches another room, where a man claims to allow him to "experience D'Angelo". He also claims that D'Angelo is not a real person, but a group of people around the world facilitating his image. The man even uses an example of a dream where Earn could be surrounded by black hands in a lake but wonders if the hands are actually trying to help him. Earn decides to leave the room.

Some time later, Alfred meets with Bunk and other YWA members at the Grammy Awards, having used a white artist, Yodel Kid (Tucker Brown), and making him more popular. After the members leave the area, Alfred approaches Benny to ask about Yodel Kid as he hasn't answered his calls and is informed that Yodel Kid died just a few hours ago of a drug overdose. At the ceremony, Yodel Kid posthumously wins Best Rap Album for his album "Born 2 Die", with his wife accepting the award. Alfred, Earn and Darius (Lakeith Stanfield) watch the telecast from a bar, with Darius remarking that Grammys aren't for black men. Earn leaves without mentioning the events at the waiting area and Alfred declines Darius' offer to join him at an after-party. Alone, Alfred thinks about the recent events.

== Production ==
=== Development ===
"I'm tired of all these old heads hating, just let me listen to my Italian drill music and blue eyed trap in peace. Y'all can listen to D'Angelo or whatever."

— Official description in the press release for the episode.

In September 2022, FX announced that the third episode of the season would be titled "Born 2 Die" and that it would be written by supervising producer Jamal Olori and directed by Adamma Ebo. This was Olori's fourth writing credit, and Ebo's first directing credit.

=== Writing ===
According to Stephen Glover, the writers tried to reach D'Angelo for a guest appearance but talks fell through. He said that a producer might have contacted him, "Someone from his camp reached out, but we didn't even think it was possible. He's mysterious and hard to track down anyway, so it probably wouldn’t have worked out. There could have been a chance, but we just assumed."

== Reception ==
=== Viewers ===
The episode was watched by 0.174 million viewers, earning a 0.0 in the 18–49 rating demographics on the Nielson ratings scale. This means that 0.0 percent of all households with televisions watched the episode. This was a slight increase from the previous episode, which was watched by 0.126 million viewers with a 0.1 in the 18–49 demographics.

=== Critical reviews ===
"Born 2 Die" received extremely positive reviews from critics. The review aggregator website Rotten Tomatoes reported a 94% approval rating with an average rating of 8.1/10 for the episode, based on 18 reviews. The website's critical consensus, "While a meandering subplot may confound more than it ultimately adds, 'Born 2 Die' is altogether thrillingly alive as Paper Boi reckons with the evolving legacy of his music."

Quinci LeGardye of The A.V. Club gave the episode a "B" and writing, "Three episodes in, it's clear that one of Atlanta's themes this season is building a legacy outside of traditional terms. Blueblood is brought back in after the premiere's pensive scavenger hunt, but the Grammy hunters see the way he left the world as a shame. If they can't get rich, they'd rather at least be known, and a funeral attended by less than 10 people is any fame-seeker's worst nightmare. In this episode, Al tries it their way and feels uncomfortable; at the same time, Earn sees D'Angelo, a man who deeply struggled with his popular image, turned into a vaguely-defined commodity. There's a national mood right now of redefining what success means under capitalism, and both of the cousins are slowly redefining themselves. I'm glad the character work is being done, even in a relatively mid episode."

Alan Sepinwall of Rolling Stone wrote, "So, no, Atlanta has never demonstrated much interest in the rags-to-riches part of Al's story. What it has been eager to discuss, however, is what comes next, especially regarding legacy. 'Teddy Perkins' was all about the latter part. So was Al's Amsterdam drug trip in last season's 'New Jazz'. Al's subplot in this season's premiere involved him realizing, via the unheralded death of his hero Blueblood, how fleeting this all can be. And now both of the stories in 'Born 2 Die' deal in different ways with what happens after a Black performer has achieved fame and fortune."

Ile-Ife Okantah of Vulture gave the episode a perfect 5 star rating out of 5 and wrote, "This is the Atlanta I missed last season, the Atlanta that would make me think for days and become an active participant in the art even when it made me uncomfortable or confused." Ben Travers of IndieWire wrote, "I don't expect a dramatic fallout between the two cousins, but such splits aren't typically easy to navigate. With seven episodes left, theirs could be the relationship that defines how Atlanta ends. What happens to Paper Boi and the business he's supporting? And, perhaps tied to the former questions, what happens to this family? Because money is important, but survival isn't enough anymore."
