= Sullivan Jones =

American actor (born 1990)

- Born: Matthew Anthony Jones; November 6, 1990 (age 35); San Rafael, California
- Occupation: Actor

Matthew Anthony Jones (born November 6, 1990), professionally known as Sullivan Jones, is an American actor. He is best known for playing Jameson Royce in the Amazon Prime Video series Harlem, Detective Miles Turner in the Hulu series Interior Chinatown, and publisher T. Thomas Fortune in the HBO historical drama series The Gilded Age.

== Early life and career ==
Jones was born in San Rafael, California and attended high school in San Francisco. He studied theater at Brown University where he also played basketball, San Francisco's American Conservatory Theatre, and the UCLA School of Theater, Film and Television. After graduating, Jones performed in regional theater and made his Broadway debut in 2019 in Jeremy O. Harris' Slave Play.

In 2017, Jones was cast in his first major television role as an FBI agent in the Hulu miniseries The Looming Tower. In 2021, he landed recurring roles in Harlem and Julian Fellowes' The Gilded Age.

== Filmography ==
=== Film ===
Year	Title	Role	Notes
2012	Love: As You Like It	Orlando	as Matt Jones
2015	Stanistan	Sam Burke	TV Movie
2020	The Surrogate	Aaron	
2021	False Positive	Bryon	
2021	18½	Barry	
2023	Big George Foreman	Muhammad Ali	

=== Television ===
Year	Title	Role	Notes
2013	Parks and Recreation	Alonzo	Episode: "Doppelgängers"
2018	The Good Fight	Blake Masters	Episode: "Day 422"
2018	The Looming Tower	Floyd Bennet	10 episodes
2018	NCIS: New Orleans	Commander Hindley	Episode: "Checkmate, Part 2"
2018	Blue Bloods	Detective Davis	Episode: "Blackout"
2018	House of Cards	Reporter	Episode: "Chapter 73"
2019	The Blacklist	MJ Ward	Episode: "Lady Luck (No. 69)"
2019	Wu-Tang: An American Saga	Officer Steven Marcus	2 episodes
2020	The Politician	Hamilton	Episode: "Hail Mary"
2021	Halston	Ed Austin	3 episodes
2021–2023	Harlem	Jameson Royce	12 episodes
2022	Atlanta	Everette Tillman	Episode: "The Homeliest Little Horse"
2022	The Equalizer	Lucas Peterson	Episode: "Paradise Lost"
2022–2025	The Gilded Age	T. Thomas Fortune	11 episodes
2024	Interior Chinatown	Miles Turner	10 episodes
2024–present	Elsbeth	Cameron Clayden	9 episodes
2025	Sistas	Dr. Vaughn	4 episodes

=== Theatre ===
Year	Title	Role	Playwright	Theatre
2018	The Winning Side	Wernher von Braun	James Wallert	Theatre Row, New York
2019	Slave Play	Phillip	Jeremy O. Harris	John Golden Theatre
