= Swarm (TV series) =

2023 American television miniseries

- Promotional poster
- Genre: Dark comedy; Comedy horror; Psychological horror; Psychological thriller; Satire
- Created by: Janine Nabers; Donald Glover
- Starring: Dominique Fishback
- Country of origin: United States
- Original language: English
- No. of episodes: 7

Production
- Executive producers: Donald Glover; Janine Nabers; Stephen Glover; Fam Udeorji; Michael Schaefer
- Producers: Dominique Fishback; Kris Baucom
- Running time: 27–39 minutes
- Production companies: Gilga; Naberhood Productions; RBA; Big Indie Pictures; Amazon Studios

Original release
- Network: Amazon Prime Video
- Release: March 17, 2023

Swarm is an American satirical dark comedy television miniseries created by Janine Nabers and Donald Glover. It follows Dre (Dominique Fishback), a young woman whose obsession with a pop star is part of what takes her down a dark path.

The series debuted on Amazon Prime Video on March 17, 2023. It received positive reviews from critics, and Fishback's performance in the series garnered widespread acclaim, receiving a nomination for Outstanding Lead Actress in a Limited or Anthology Series or Movie at the 75th Primetime Emmy Awards. The series received two additional nominations, including Outstanding Writing For A Limited Or Anthology Series Or Movie for Nabers and Glover for the episode "Stung".

== Synopsis ==
The series tells the story of Dre, a young woman deeply obsessed with Ni'Jah, a world-famous popstar whose fanbase is known as "The Swarm". The show is a deep dive into Dre's life, her desire, her fandom, and how elusive Ni'Jah influences her life, which takes her down a dark road.

== Cast and characters ==
=== Main ===
- Dominique Fishback as Andrea "Dre" Greene, a young woman whose obsession with Ni'Jah, a world-famous popstar, leads her on a dark and murderous path across the United States

=== Recurring ===
- Chloe Bailey as Marissa "Ris" Jackson, Dre's foster sister

=== Guest ===
- Damson Idris as Khalid, Marissa's boyfriend
- Rory Culkin as Marcus, a man Dre meets at the club and goes home with
- Karen Rodriguez as Erica, Marissa's friend and boss
- Paris Jackson as Hailey, a stripper who has an abusive boyfriend and who goes by the name Halsey
- X Mayo as Cheeks, Dre's boss at the strip club who is also a stripper
- Atkins Estimond as Reggie, a man Dre is hunting who tweeted negative things about Marissa and Ni'Jah
- Byron Bowers as George, a sound man whom Dre uses to get closer to Ni'Jah
- Stephen Glover as Caché, a rapper and Ni'Jah's husband, a pastiche of Jay-Z
- Billie Eilish as Eva, a women's empowerment cult leader who takes Dre under her wing
- Kate Lyn Sheil as Cricket, a girl who offers Dre a place to stay during Bonnaroo
- Victoria Blade as Salem
- Leon as Harris, Marissa's father who blames Dre for her death
- Rickey Thompson as Kenny, a Houston man phone repair store clerk, who refuses to fix Marissa's phone for Dre
- Heather Alicia Simms as Loretta Greene, a detective in the "real world" who has started to piece together that these killings have a common thread, the victims have all insulted a superstar with a vicious fan base on social media
- Kiersey Clemons as Rashida, a graduate student with whom Dre falls in love
- Cree Summer as Jackie, Rashida's mother
- Norm Lewis as Wilbur, Rashida's father
- Jayden Braddock as Pedestrian (uncredited)

In addition, Nirine S. Brown acts as Ni'Jah, a pop star whom Dre idolizes. She is a pastiche of Beyoncé. Her music was performed by Kirby.

== Episodes ==
No.	Title	Directed by	Written by	Original release date
1	"Stung"	Donald Glover	Teleplay by : Janine Nabers; Story by : Janine Nabers & Donald Glover	March 17, 2023
In 2016, withdrawn Andrea "Dre" Greene lives with her foster sister Marissa in Houston. While Marissa's interest in pop star Ni'Jah has waned with age, Dre is as obsessed with her as ever. After an incident at their job, Marissa decides to spend the night with Khalid and reveals her plans to eventually move in with him. Dre tries to stop her by telling her of Khalid's behavior and attempts at infidelity, which enrages Marissa; she storms out. When Ni'Jah releases a surprise album, an empowered Dre goes to a club and loses her virginity. She wakes up to find that Marissa has committed suicide following a heated argument with Khalid, having accused him of cheating, and Ni'Jah's fans on Twitter claim she did it over the new album. Dre goes to Khalid's house, and despite his clear display of remorse, impulsively kills him in a psychotic rage.
2	"Honey"	Adamma Ebo	Jamal Olori	March 17, 2023
Now 2017, Dre works as a stripper in Fayetteville, Tennessee, trying to find Reggie Wilkins, one of the people who tweeted about Marissa and Ni'Jah. A stripper with an abusive boyfriend latches onto Dre, who kills the boyfriend after witnessing them arguing. The stripper discovers her moving the body and decides to help, but Dre kills her after burying him. A group of strippers ask Dre for a ride to a house call. She gets a flat tire on the way back, but Wilkins, a tow truck driver, runs into them and offers to fix the car at his house. Dre goes back into the house when he finishes and attacks him. He gets the upper hand and starts to strangle her, only for the strippers to come looking for her and kill him. She drives off, leaving them with the body.
3	"Taste"	Adamma Ebo	Janine Nabers & Kara Brown	March 17, 2023
Four months later, Dre is tracking down and killing people who insult Ni'Jah on Twitter. She travels to Los Angeles and stalks her next target, only to notice a man working at the release party of Ni'Jah's husband's new album. She follows him home and seduces him, getting him to take her to the party and locking him in a freezer. She infiltrates the party and approaches Ni'Jah, but, overwhelmed, bites her and flees.
4	"Running Scared"	Ibra Ake	Ibra Ake and Stephen Glover	March 17, 2023
Another four months later, Dre is driving to Bonnaroo to see Ni'Jah when she is tailed by a police officer, only to be rescued by a girl at a gas station. The girl leads her to a "female empowerment" group of white women led by Eva, who takes a liking to Dre. She discovers that her bloody car has been cleaned and her phone is missing. Through a series of intense "counseling" sessions with Eva, she reveals her background with Marissa and that she enjoyed committing the murders. She panics during a ritual and tries to leave, but Eva attempts to manipulate and blackmail her into staying. Dre retrieves her phone and runs Eva over, driving away and killing a group member who clung to the top of her car. She makes it to Bonnaroo but finds that it is already over.
5	"Girl, Bye"	Ibra Ake	Teleplay by : Janine Nabers & Malia Ann; Story by : Janine Nabers & Ibra Ake	March 17, 2023
A month later, Marissa's phone number is deactivated by her father Harris, leading Dre back to Houston. She runs into her and Marissa's former boss and fabricates a story about working as Ni'Jah's mother's makeup artist. She breaks into Harris's house and steals his pistol, which she uses to coerce his wife into turning the number back on. Harris, blaming Dre for Marissa's suicide, tries to shoot her with a shotgun. She flees into Marissa's old room and freezes when she sees her old shrine for Ni'Jah, before narrowly escaping out the window.
6	"Fallin' Through the Cracks"	Stephen Glover	Karen Joseph Adcock & Stephen Glover	March 17, 2023
The true crime documentary Falling Through the Cracks follows Memphis detective Loretta Greene as she investigates Dre's murders. She establishes a connection between the victims and their dislike of an immensely popular and influential artist implied to be Beyoncé, tracing it back to Khalid. She finds Dre through Marissa's Instagram page and visits Marissa's mother Patricia in Houston, who tells Greene that Dre stabbed one of Marissa's friends when they were younger, the incident that got her kicked out of the family. Dre's caseworker refuses to disclose her background to Greene, and accuses the filmmaker of wanting to ignore his own flaws by digging for Dre's. Greene eventually learns that Dre has been arrested for invading the stage during a Beyoncé concert in Atlanta, and sets out to talk to her. Interview footage of Donald Glover is shown where he claims he is working on a show about Dre. This, along with each character being played by a different actor, suggests that Swarm is a recreation of events implied to have happened in the real world.
7	"Only God Makes Happy Endings"	Adamma Ebo	Janine Nabers	March 17, 2023
In Atlanta, June 2018, Dre, having ditched her phone and posing as a sexually ambiguous lesbian named Toni, goes home with a graduate student named Rashida. As the police find her car, she starts a relationship with Rashida despite her strong dislike of Ni'Jah. She eventually meets Rashida's parents and moves in with her. Dre gets Ni'Jah tickets for their anniversary, leading to an argument that escalates when she strangles Rashida to death. She burns the body, but accidentally leaves the tickets in Rashida's pocket. She kills a scalper for his ticket and runs onstage, but Ni'Jah, whom Dre envisions as Marissa, stops her security detail from restraining Dre and lets her speak to the crowd. She tells the fans that she loves them and leaves with Ni'Jah, tearfully resting her head on her shoulder as they get in her car.

== Production ==
=== Development ===
In February 2021, Donald Glover signed an overall deal with Amazon Studios. One of the projects in development included Hive, which would revolve around a figure inspired by Beyoncé, with Janine Nabers acting as co-creator and showrunner. Glover is also credited as creator and executive producer, and directed the first episode.

=== Writing ===
Glover compared the series to "post-truth Piano Teacher mixed with The King of Comedy". Glover and Nabers wanted to create an anti-hero story, using Tony Soprano and Don Draper as inspiration.

Malia Obama is among the writers of the series. Nabers said, "We really wanted to give her the opportunity to get her feet wet in TV and see if this is something she wants to continue doing."

=== Casting ===
In April 2022, Dominique Fishback was announced as the lead actress of the series, also joining as a producer. Glover contacted Fishback to play the role of the lead's sister. Fishback convinced Glover to give her the lead role. The series also stars Chloe Bailey as Dre's sister, Marissa and Damson Idris as Marissa's boyfriend.

== Music ==
On March 17, 2023, the original soundtrack was released. The extended play included accompanying music from the series performed by Donald Glover and Kirby.

No.	Title	Writer(s)	Producer(s)	Length
1.	"Something Like That" (performed by Ni'jah and Kirby)	Donald Glover; Kirby Lauryen Dockery; Riley Mackin	Donald Glover	3:36
2.	"Agatha" (performed by Ni'jah)	Dockery	Jeff Kleinman; Teo Halm; Michael Uzowuru	3:00
3.	"Big World" (performed by Ni'jah and Kirby)	Christopher Lloyd; Dockery; Michael Uzowuru	Choker; Michael Uzowuru	2:40
4.	"Adventure" (performed by Ni'jah and Kirby)	Dockery	Samuel Ivoko; Vikas	2:54
5.	"Hahaha" (performed by Ni'jah and Kirby)	Dockery	Leken	1:53
6.	"Sticky" (performed by Ni'jah, Kirby and Childish Gambino)	Glover; Dockery	Dylan Wiggins; Donald Glover; Michael Uzowuru	2:51
Total length:				16:58

== Release ==
Swarm premiered at the 2023 South by Southwest Film Festival on March 10, 2023. All seven episodes were released on March 17, 2023, on Amazon Prime Video.

== Reception ==
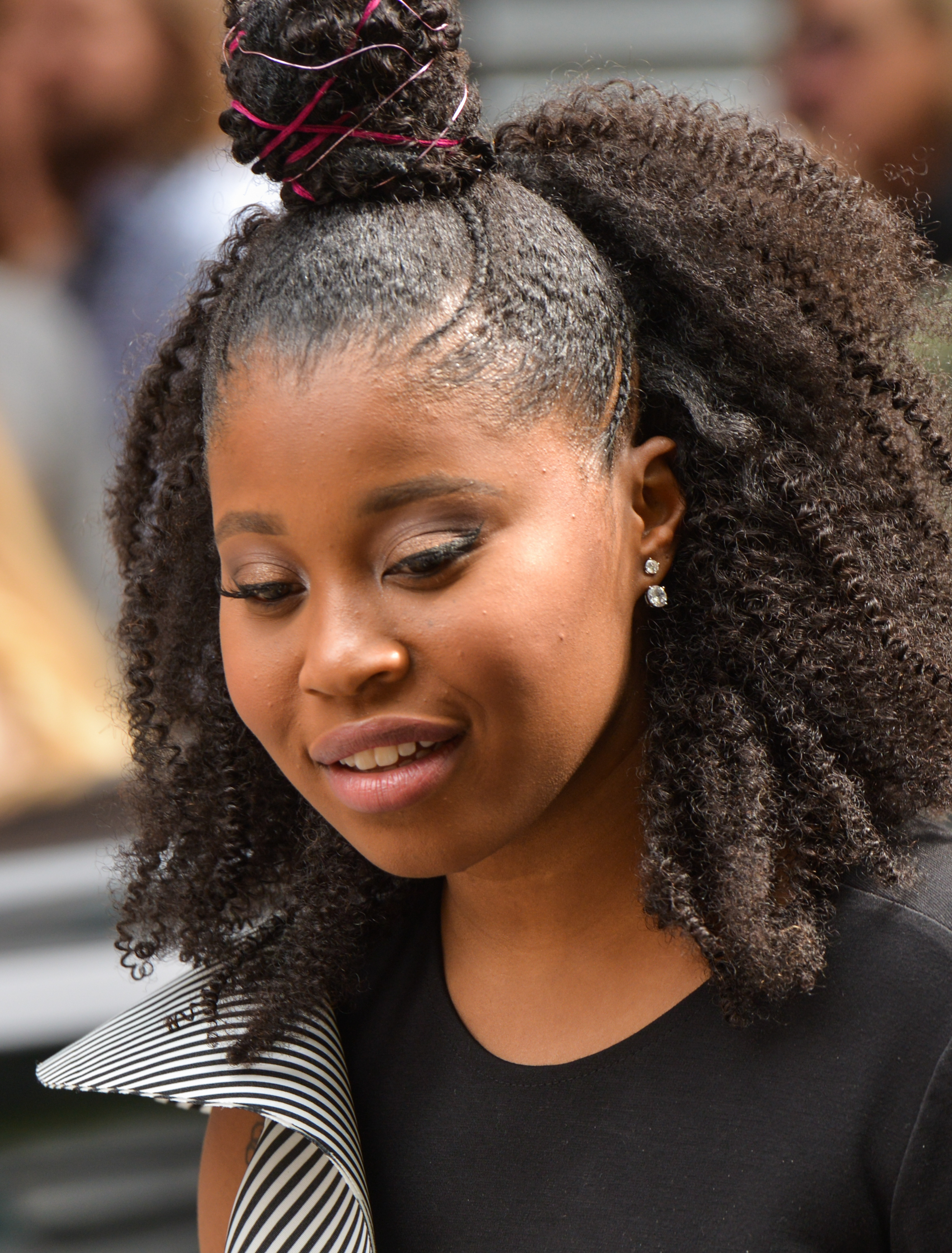
Dominique Fishback received widespread acclaim for her role in the television series.

Swarm has received positive reviews from critics, with the performance of Dominique Fishback receiving unanimous praise. On the review aggregator website Rotten Tomatoes, Swarm holds an approval rating of 87%, based on 68 critic reviews. The website's critics consensus reads, "Swarm can be as unpleasant as a hornet sting, but Dominique Fishback's ferocious performance and the creators' bold creative swings add up to a truly subversive take on toxic fandom." Metacritic, which uses a weighted average, has assigned the series a score of 66 out of 100 based on 26 critics, indicating "generally favorable reviews".

At RogerEbert.com, Nick Allen gave the series 3.5 out of 4 stars, calling it a "blood-splattered pop culture provocation" that "plays out like a funhouse mirror reflection of very real, however bizarre, trending topics of the recent past." He also wrote that Donald Glover's directorial pilot episode was "terrific" and that "the series' satire is all the more heartbreaking and compulsively watchable because of [Dominique] Fishback's dedication to every facet of Dre."

TVLine named Fishback the "Performer of the Week" for the week of March 25, 2023, for her performance in the seventh and final episode "Only God Makes Happy Endings". The site wrote, "Fishback gets a shot at the spotlight and knocks it out of the park, blowing us away with a fascinating portrait of a obsessive fan who gets pushed over the edge and goes off on a deranged killing spree. Fishback was phenomenal throughout the series, but she saved the very best for Swarm's final episode, shape-shifting before our eyes to show us yet another layer to Dre."

=== Accolades ===
Year	Award	Category	Nominee(s)	Result	Ref.
2023	Black Reel Television Awards	Outstanding Television Movie or Limited Series	Swarm	Nominated	
2023	Black Reel Television Awards	Outstanding Lead Performance, TV Movie/Limited Series	Dominique Fishback	Won	
2023	Black Reel Television Awards	Outstanding Directing, TV Movie/Limited Series	Ibra Ake (for "Running Scared")	Nominated	
2023	Black Reel Television Awards	Outstanding Writing, TV Movie/Limited Series	Karen Joseph Adcock & Stephen Glover ("Fallin' Through the Cracks")	Nominated	
2023	Black Reel Television Awards	Outstanding Writing, TV Movie/Limited Series	Ibra Ake & Stephen Glover (for "Running Scared")	Won	
2023	Black Reel Television Awards	Outstanding Musical Score	Michael Uzowuru	Nominated	
2023	Black Reel Television Awards	Outstanding Original Song	Riley Mackin, KIRBY & Childish Gambino (for "Something Like That")	Nominated	
2023	Black Reel Television Awards	Outstanding Costume Design	Dominique Dawson	Nominated	
2023	Golden Trailer Awards	Best WildPosts for a TV/Streaming Series	Swarm (GrandSon Creative)	Won	
2023	Gotham Independent Film Awards	Breakthrough Television Under 40 Minutes	Swarm	Nominated	
2023	Gotham Independent Film Awards	Outstanding Performance in a New Series	Dominique Fishback	Nominated	
2023	Hollywood Critics Association TV Awards	Best Actress in a Streaming Limited or Anthology Series or Movie	Dominique Fishback	Nominated	
2023	Independent Spirit Awards	Best Lead Performance in a New Scripted Series	Dominique Fishback	Nominated	
2023	Primetime Emmy Awards	Outstanding Lead Actress in a Limited or Anthology Series or Movie	Dominique Fishback	Nominated	
2023	Primetime Emmy Awards	Outstanding Writing For A Limited Or Anthology Series Or Movie	Janine Nabers & Donald Glover (for "Stung")	Nominated	
2023	Primetime Creative Arts Emmy Awards	Outstanding Contemporary Costumes for a Limited or Anthology Series or Movie	Dominique Dawson, Brittny Chapman, Mashal Khan (for "Honey")	Nominated	
2023	Television Critics Association Awards	Individual Achievement in Drama	Dominique Fishback	Nominated	
2024	NAACP Image Awards	Outstanding Television Movie, Mini-Series or Dramatic Special	Swarm	Won	
2024	NAACP Image Awards	Outstanding Actress in a Television Movie, Mini-Series or Dramatic Special	Dominique Fishback	Nominated	
2024	NAACP Image Awards	Outstanding Supporting Actor in a Television Movie, Limited-Series or Dramatic Special	Damson Idris	Nominated	
2024	NAACP Image Awards	Outstanding Directing in a Comedy Series	Donald Glover	Nominated	
2024	NAACP Image Awards	Outstanding Writing in a Comedy Series	Donald Glover, Janine Nabers	Nominated	
2024	People's Choice Awards	The TV Performance of the Year	Billie Eilish	Won	
2024	Critics' Choice Super Awards	Best Horror Series, Limited Series or Made-for-TV Movie	Swarm	Nominated	
2024	Critics' Choice Super Awards	Best Actress in a Horror Series, Limited Series or Made-for-TV Movie	Dominique Fishback	Nominated	

== See also ==
- All About Lily Chou-Chou, a 2001 Japanese film with a similar plot
- Perfect Blue, a 1997 anime film with a similar theme directed by Satoshi Kon
