= Is That Black Enough for You?!? =

2022 American documentary film

- Release poster
- Directed by: Elvis Mitchell
- Written by: Elvis Mitchell
- Starring: Margaret Avery; Harry Belafonte; Charles Burnett
- Distributed by: Netflix
- Release dates: October 9, 2022 (New York Film Festival); October 28, 2022 (United States); November 11, 2022 (Netflix)
- Running time: 135 minutes
- Country: United States
- Language: English

Is That Black Enough for You?!? (stylized in all caps) is a 2022 American documentary film and film essay written and directed by culture critic and historian Elvis Mitchell.

== Summary ==
The film examines the history, craft, and legacy of African-American cinema, particularly films released in the 1970s. It takes its title from a recurring line in Cotton Comes to Harlem (1970).

It includes film excerpts, personal history, and interviews with artists such as Margaret Avery, Harry Belafonte, Charles Burnett, Laurence Fishburne, Whoopi Goldberg, Samuel L. Jackson, Suzanne de Passe, Glynn Turman, Billy Dee Williams, and Zendaya.

== Release ==
Is That Black Enough for You?!? premiered at the 60th New York Film Festival on October 9, 2022, had its limited theatrical release on October 28, and was released on Netflix on November 11, 2022.

== Reception ==
On the review aggregator website Rotten Tomatoes, Is That Black Enough For You?!? holds a perfect score of 100%, based on 42 reviews with an average rating of 8.1/10. The site's consensus reads: "An indispensable watch for film buffs, Is That Black Enough for You?!? shines a sorely needed spotlight on a remarkably rich period in the medium's history." On Metacritic, which uses a weighted average, the film has a score of 83 out of 100 based on 16 reviews.
