= The Most Atlanta =

- Atlanta episode
- Episode no.: Season 4 Episode 1
- Directed by: Hiro Murai
- Written by: Stephen Glover
- Editing by: Kyle Reiter
- Production code: XAA04001
- Original air date: September 15, 2022
- Running time: 26 minutes

Guest appearances
- Deadra Moore as Christine; Earl Sweatshirt as Blueblood

Episode chronology
← Previous "Tarrare"	Next → "The Homeliest Little Horse"
- Atlanta season 4

"The Most Atlanta" is the first episode of the fourth season of the American comedy-drama television series Atlanta. It is the 32nd overall episode of the series and was written by executive producer Stephen Glover, and directed by executive producer Hiro Murai. It was first broadcast on FX in the United States on September 15, 2022, airing back-to-back with the follow-up episode, "The Homeliest Little Horse".

The series is set in Atlanta and follows Earnest "Earn" Marks, as he tries to redeem himself in the eyes of his ex-girlfriend Van, who is also the mother of his daughter Lottie; as well as his parents and his cousin Alfred, who raps under the stage name "Paper Boi"; and Darius, Alfred's eccentric right-hand man. After staying in Europe for a tour during the previous season, the season sees the characters back in Atlanta. In the episode, the characters find themselves in different situations with Darius fleeing from a woman in a mobility scooter (a plot line inspired by It Follows), Alfred engaging in a scavenger hunt, and Earn and Van finding their exes at a mall, becoming trapped in the apparently infinite carpark beneath.

According to Nielsen Media Research, the episode was seen by an estimated 0.216 million household viewers and gained a 0.1 ratings share among adults aged 18–49. The episode received critical acclaim, with critics deeming the episode as a return to form following the previous season, praising the writing, directing, performances, humor and tone.

== Plot ==
Darius (Lakeith Stanfield) calmly walks through a Target store, which is being looted by the customers. He approaches a frightened employee to return an air fryer. The employee is astounded at his ignorance of the events and when he opens the register to give him the money, the employee decides to run away with the cash. As he makes his way out, he is pursued by a woman (Deadra Moore) in a mobility scooter who wanted to prevent people from leaving the store.

Darius then returns to meet with Alfred (Brian Tyree Henry), who has been stuck in traffic. While Alfred laments the recently announced death of a rapper named Blueblood, Darius realizes that the woman in the scooter has followed him all the way to their car. He decides to leave the car with the woman chasing him with a knife while a confused Alfred stares at him. Meanwhile, Earn (Donald Glover) and Van (Zazie Beetz) go out in Atlantic Station, where they run into some of Earn's previous girlfriends. While shopping, Van also runs into an ex-boyfriend, confusing both of them to see so many familiar faces.

Fed up with the traffic, Alfred decides to leave for a gas station. Inspired by the lyrics of a song by Blueblood, he visits a barbecue spot and after ordering a specific order, receives instructions to head to another place, signaling that he is part of a scavenger hunt. After finding more clues at many locations, he reaches the final location: a saloon, where he is welcomed by Keisha (Chimere Love), Blueblood's widow. She reveals that the hunt was part of Blueblood's quest, as he knew he was dying and decided to record the album and make the scavenger hunt, with his PR team not announcing his death until three months later. The final clue turns out to out to be Blueblood's funeral, with four other fans having already discovered it. After being granted a gift plant, he approaches Blueblood's casket, only to be told by Keisha that his body had to be cremated one month ago and was replaced with a fake skeleton, leaving him further uncertain as to whether or not Blueblood is actually dead.

Back at Atlantic Station, Earn and Van keep running into their exes and struggle to find their car in the parking garage. As night falls, they decide to leave through an emergency exit. As they make their way through the dark room, they finally reach the end and emerge in the saloon, meeting Alfred and Keisha, while one of Earn's exes, Kenya (Sh'Kia Augustin), also appears after following them. As they leave the saloon, they find Darius outside. When Kenya states she doesn't have a birthday gift for his father, Darius decides to give her the air fryer and leaves with Alfred, Earn and Van. As Kenya waits outside for an Uber, the mobility scooter is heard approaching her.

== Production ==
=== Development ===
"Woooh chile, Atl is the GHETTO these days. I'm thinking about moving to Miami where it's safe. Leave all my exes on read."

— Official description in the press release for the episode.

In August 2022, FX announced that the first episode of the season would be titled "The Most Atlanta" and that it would be written by executive producer Stephen Glover and directed by executive producer Hiro Murai. This was Glover's tenth writing credit, and Murai's 21st directing credit.

=== Writing ===
Darius' storyline was inspired by a real-life event, where during the George Floyd protests in Minneapolis, a video spread showing a woman in a wheelchair confronting looters with a knife, as well as the 2014 American horror-thriller film It Follows, scenes with the woman being shot in a similar manner to the slow-approaching creature in that film.

Alfred's storyline drew parallelisms to rapper MF Doom, who served as an inspiration for the fictional artist Blueblood. Consequence noted that MF Doom, "similar to Atlanta's fictional rapper, had a reputation in hip hop for being larger than life never being seen without a mask, sometimes sending impersonators to perform as him at shows, and only having his death publicly reported by his family months after the fact."

=== Casting ===
During the episode, music by the fictional artist Blueblood is heard as part of the scavenger hunt. Earl Sweatshirt provided the vocals for Blueblood.

== Reception ==
=== Viewers ===
The episode was watched by 0.216 million viewers, earning a 0.1 in the 18-49 rating demographics on the Nielson ratings scale. This means that 0.1 percent of all households with televisions watched the episode. This was a 42% increase from the previous episode, which was watched by 0.152 million viewers with a 0.1 in the 18-49 demographics.

=== Critical reviews ===
"The Most Atlanta" received critical acclaim. The review aggregator website Rotten Tomatoes reported a 95% approval rating with an average rating of 8.4/10 for the episode, based on 22 reviews. The site's consensus states: "'The Most Atlanta' lives up to its name by showcasing all of Atlanta's satirical savvy and surrealistic flourishes, promising a final season that feels like coming home."

Quinci LeGardye of The A.V. Club gave the episode an "A" and writing, "'The Most Atlanta' turns that concept into a full-fledged horror in a way that's so visceral and so Atlanta that I plan to show clips of it to anyone who asks, 'So what's that series about?'"

Alan Sepinwall of Rolling Stone wrote, "'The Most Atlanta' brings us back to the titular city. It offers stories featuring all four leads. And, like Atlanta does so often at its best, it dances along a very blurry line between genres, so that we are watching a trio of horror stories of varying kinds that at different points leak into mystery, comedy, relationship drama, social commentary, and more. It's an utter delight." Ile-Ife Okantah of Vulture gave the episode a 4 star rating out of 5 and wrote, "Coming back to Atlanta is the perfect and most obvious way to begin such a bittersweet ending, bringing the characters and actors back to where it all started. Atlanta is at its best when exploring themes of race, power, and culture through the core characters, and it's hard to capture that outside of, well, Atlanta."

Alison Herman of The Ringer wrote, "By returning to its home turf, Atlanta sets up an easy, simple narrative: by going back to the place and people it knows, the show goes back to the humor and storytelling that made it a phenomenon. But if there's any show that resists simple narratives, it's Atlanta, which avoids linear plotting like the plague. So it's fitting that the reality is a bit more nuanced." Jeremy Mathai of /Film wrote, "The inexplicable oddities, slice-of-life tangents, celebrity cameos, and unsettling blend between reality and the surreal threaded throughout each prior season remained present and accounted for... thankfully, all of which is back and bolder than ever before in season 4." Kyndall Cunningham of The Daily Beast wrote, "The first episode though, appropriately titled 'The Most Atlanta', is some pretty light, plot-less fare, combining the show's surrealist method of storytelling with some local, in-house humor."
