= It Was All a Dream (Atlanta) =

- Atlanta episode
- Episode no.: Season 4 Episode 10
- Directed by: Hiro Murai
- Written by: Donald Glover
- Cinematography by: Christian Sprenger
- Editing by: Kyle Reiter; Isaac Hagy
- Production code: XAA04010
- Original air date: November 10, 2022
- Running time: 35 minutes

Guest appearances
- Calvin Dutton as Demarcus; Cree Summer as herself; Kevin Iso as Chi

Episode chronology
← Previous "Andrew Wyeth. Alfred's World."	Next → —
- Atlanta season 4

"It Was All a Dream" is the series finale of the American comedy-drama television series Atlanta. It is the tenth episode of the fourth season and is the 41st overall episode of the series. The episode was written by series creator and main actor Donald Glover, and directed by executive producer Hiro Murai. It was first broadcast on FX in the United States on November 10, 2022.

The series is set in Atlanta and follows Earnest "Earn" Marks, as he tries to redeem himself in the eyes of his ex-girlfriend Van, who is also the mother of his daughter Lottie; as well as his parents and his cousin Alfred, who raps under the stage name "Paper Boi"; and Darius, Alfred's eccentric right-hand man. After staying in Europe for a tour during the previous season, the season sees the characters back in Atlanta. In the series finale, Darius experiences hallucinations as a result of a sensory deprivation tank, making him question what is real. Meanwhile, Earn, Alfred and Van visit a Black-owned restaurant, which proves to be a disastrous experience.

According to Nielsen Media Research, the episode was seen by an estimated 0.223 million household viewers and gained a 0.07 ratings share among adults aged 18–49. The series finale received universal acclaim from critics, who viewed the episode as a fitting end to the series as a whole. Critics highlighted the acting, writing, directing, and ambiguity as strong points.

== Plot ==
Darius (Lakeith Stanfield) is watching Judge Judy when he is questioned by Earn (Donald Glover) and Alfred (Brian Tyree Henry) about joining them at a new restaurant. Darius intends to join, but he first wants to visit a clinic where he undergoes a sensory deprivation tank.

Darius first arrives at a pharmacy for medication. While waiting, he exchanges a conversation with a customer (Cree Summer) about their perception of reality. Darius states that for him, in order to know what is real or not, he watches Judge Judy and if she is "thick", he knows he is in a dream. After leaving the pharmacy, he runs into an old friend, London (Naté Jones), and joins her in her car. They are soon stopped by a police officer, who suspects that London was driving under the influence of alcohol. London manages to pass the sobriety test but suddenly grabs the officer's gun and drives away in her car, accidentally hitting a girl on a bike. She then runs away and leaves the gun to a horrified Darius. Suddenly, Darius wakes up in his sensory deprivation tank, the incident just part of a dream.

Earn and Alfred meet with Van (Zazie Beetz) at the restaurant, which is located in an abandoned Blockbuster store. Earn wants them to give the restaurant a chance, as it is a Black-owned sushi restaurant. However, their experience turns out to be exhausting: the tables don't allow them to comfortably sit and the food proves to be too exotic for them. Alfred wants to leave the restaurant to eat familiar food at the Popeyes across the street, but Earn tells him to stay. Meanwhile, Darius experiences more dream sequences, after which he lashes out at some of the customers and is promptly kicked out of the clinic. He then visits his brother Chi (Kevin Iso), but the visit turns out to be part of another dream.

Alfred's patience runs out when he is offered fugu – which the waiter notes is poisonous if not prepared correctly – and he sets out to leave for Popeyes with Earn and Van. However, the restaurant's owner, Demarcus (Calvin Dutton) catches them leaving, correctly guesses they're going to Popeyes, and berates them for not supporting their Black colleagues, lamenting that businesses collapse due to customers not supporting their community. Demarcus orders his staff to lock the doors to force them to eat their dinner, scaring them. Darius suddenly arrives and escapes with them in a pink Maserati. As they flee, Darius reveals that he bought food from Popeyes, delighting them.

In the final scene, the gang is back at Alfred's home. Darius reveals that the Maserati is stolen, but he is not worried about the police as he believes this is another hallucination, concerning the gang. As Earn, Alfred, and Van go outside to smoke a blunt, Darius stays in the room, watching Judge Judy. As sirens are heard, Darius is seen smiling, not showing what he saw on television.

== Production ==
=== Development ===
"You know what? As much as I hated this show, I think I'm gonna miss it."

— Official description in the press release for the episode.

In February 2022, FX confirmed that the series would end with the fourth season. Glover considered ending the series with the second season, but he chose to end the series with the fourth season as "Death is natural. I feel like when the conditions are right for something, they happen, and when the conditions aren't right, they don't happen. I don't feel any longevity. Because then things start to get weird. The story was always supposed to be what it was. And the story, it really was us. Everybody in that writers' room, everybody on set. It really was what we were going through and what we talked about." He further added, "It was great, all of that came out this season and it ends perfectly."

In October 2022, FX announced that the series finale would be titled "It Was All a Dream" and that it would be written by series creator and main actor Donald Glover, and directed by executive producer Hiro Murai. This was Glover's ninth writing credit, and Murai's 26th directing credit. Murai indicated that originally, the episode wasn't going to be the series finale, but the crew settled on it as Glover wrote the episode. He recalled that a writer said that the episode should serve as the finale, as it was "emotional and poignant but also ridiculous as the last episode of this four-season show."

=== Writing ===
Stephen Glover described the process of writing the finale as being intentionally unorthodox, referring to it as being like King of the Hill; instead of viewing the episode as the series finale, the writers viewed it as a regular episode. Hiro Murai explained that they based the decision after feeling that they gave closure to the characters in the previous episodes, saying "There's obviously an existential dread undercurrent through it, like the whole series, but beat-by-beat, it feels like the kind of hijinks you'd see in any episode of the show." He further added, "It felt very important to us to do something that’s simultaneously a very silly, ridiculous idea, and something that actually meant something to us at the same time."

Putting Darius as the center of the episode felt fitting for the writers, as they viewed him as "our perspective character for the whole world that we've created for the last four seasons." The use of Judge Judy as a vital plot point emerged from a meme of "thick Judge Judy", with the writers deciding that the device worked in the use of hallucinations. The crew contacted Judy Sheindlin to ask for permission to use her image, which she granted.

== Final scene ==
The final scene depicts Darius watching Judge Judy, with the camera omitting the content of the television set and ending with Darius smiling, leaving audiences to question whether the events were real or a dream. Comparisons were made to the series finales of The Sopranos and Newhart, both of which question the idea of reality.

Executive producer Stephen Glover said that the scene was meant to symbolize, "Whether it's real or fake, it all feels real to you anyway. I think that's just the idea that we walked away with — this idea of having your friends together and having a good time and eating Popeye's and laughing."

The A.V. Club viewed the final scene as "not a corny reproduction but a clever instance in which Glover takes the belief that the audience has suspended ever since the invisible car and shoves it back onto us all for a brief moment." Alan Sepinwall offered his own interpretation of the scene, writing "that the smile on his face is him embracing the life he has, the friends he gets to be with, and the periodic opportunities he gets to share his time with beautiful spirits like Cree." The New York Times cited the season's episode "Crank Dat Killer" as a fundamental explanation of the series as a whole, "This could be a joke about how everyone knows everybody in Atlanta, or about the labyrinthine design of shopping centers, which, like casinos, want you to forget time itself. But the joke, like every other bit in the show, is, thankfully, never explained."

== Reception ==
=== Viewers ===
The episode was watched by 0.223 million viewers, earning a 0.07 in the 18-49 rating demographics on the Nielson ratings scale. This means that 0.07 percent of all households with televisions watched the episode. This was a 90% increase from the previous episode, which was watched by 0.126 million viewers with a 0.05 in the 18-49 demographics.

=== Critical reviews ===
"It Was All a Dream" received universal acclaim from critics. The review aggregator website Rotten Tomatoes reported a 100% approval rating, based on six reviews, with an average rating of 9.30 out of 10.

Quinci LeGardye of The A.V. Club gave the episode an "A" and writing, "I'm really glad that this is how the show left us. I assume there will be naysayers about the ending, because you can find a naysayer about literally anything. I'm focusing on the craft of storytelling, the way the episode tricked us along with Darius multiple times, fit another social-commentary monologue into the B-plot, and did it all pretty much flawlessly. Tomorrow I'll be sad that such a show has ended, but tonight I'm leaning back with a smile on my face, happy that Glover and the Atlanta team got to make their weird, indescribable, creative, excellent show."

Alan Sepinwall of Rolling Stone wrote, "But if it is all meant to be 'real'? Then life is, for that moment, pretty great for Darius. And it's been great for those of us lucky enough to watch this special, special show, and this all-time classic final season. Now let's all fire up a new episode of Judy Justice and see how our favorite courtroom personality looks."

Ile-Ife Okantah of Vulture gave the episode a perfect 5 star rating out of 5 and wrote, "It's the end of an era. Donald and Stephen Glover's acclaimed series has reached its conclusion, and I'm truly satisfied with the journey. This series will live on in a lot of people's hearts, and this finale, 'It Was All a Dream', solidifies its permanent place in Black culture. The trio of men we met as they were muddling through day-to-day life in Atlanta with vague dreams of the future have gone from sitting on a discarded couch in an abandoned field to sitting on quality furniture in Al's modern apartment."
