= Janine Nabers =

American writer

- Born: Houston, Texas, U.S.
- Education: Ithaca College (BFA); The New School (MFA); Juilliard School (GrDip)
- Notable work: Atlanta, Swarm
- Awards: NAACP Image Award for Outstanding Limited Series, Swarm Peabody Award, Atlanta

Janine Nabers is an American playwright and television writer.

== Early life ==
Nabers was born in Houston, Texas to Janet and Cornelius Nabers. She attended Alief Elsik High School in Houston. Nabers has a BA in theater from Ithaca College and an MFA in playwriting from The New School. She is also a graduate of the Lila Acheson Wallace American Playwrights Program at the Juilliard School in New York City.

== Career ==
=== Theater ===
Nabers was initially interested in becoming a stage actress but her frustration with the lack of Black roles in plays encouraged her to try playwriting instead. In 2011, she was Page 73's Playwriting Fellow and was named New York Theatre Workshop Playwriting Fellow the following year. As a student at Juilliard, her play Annie Bosh is Missing was chosen as a finalist for the 2012-2013 Alliance/Kendeda National Graduate Playwriting Competition. Annie Bosh is Missing follows 22-year-old drug addict Annie Bosh who wanders the tumultuous streets of Houston after Hurricane Katrina. The play premiered at the Steppenwolf Theatre Company in 2013. In 2013, Nabers was the New York Foundation for the Arts Playwriting fellowship

For 2013-2014, Nabers was the AETNA Playwriting Fellow at Hartford Stage. Nabers' play, Serial Black Face, about a single mother coping with the disappearance of her son during the Atlanta child murders, won the 2014 Yale Drama Series prize. The award included publication by the Yale University Press. Serial Black Face had its world premiere at the Actor's Express Theatre Company in Atlanta, Georgia in 2016.

Nabers' other works include A Swell in the Ground, which premiered at the Gift Theatre in Chicago, Illinois in 2017 and Welcome to Jesus, which premiered at The American Theater Company in Chicago in 2017, Juniper; Jubilee and The Peterson Show.

Nabers is an alumna of the Ars Nova Play Group, the Soho Rep Writer/Director Lab, the Dramatists Guild Playwriting Fellowship, the MacDowell Colony Fellowship, and the 2010 and 2011 Sundance Theatre Labs. She is also a member of the MCC Playwrights Coalition and the Dorothy Strelsin New American Writers Group at Primary Stages.

=== Television ===
Nabers' television writing credits include Bravo's first scripted series Girlfriends' Guide to Divorce, Lifetime's UnREAL and AMC's Dietland. She is credited as Supervising Producer on the first and second episodes of HBO's Watchmen, winning a Writers Guild Award in 2020. and was Co-Executive Producer on Netflix's Away. Nabers was a writer on the third season of Atlanta, winning a Peabody Award. In 2021, she signed an overall deal with Amazon Studios. In 2023, Swarm, the series Nabers co-created with Donald Glover, was released on Amazon’s Prime Video. In 2024, Nabers won a NAACP Image Award for Best Limited Series and was nominated for her first Emmy for Best Writing for Limited Series.

Deadline reported that Nabers is in development on her third project for Amazon, a collaboration with Mattel, on a live action Shani Girl series, with Nabers as showrunner.

== Works ==
=== Theatre ===
- Juniper; Jubilee
- Annie Bosh is Missing
- Serial Black Face
- A Swell in the Ground
- Welcome to Jesus
- The Peterson Show

=== Television ===
Year	Title	Role(s)	Notes
2015 - 2018	Girlfriends' Guide to Divorce	Story Editor	Episode 2x01: Rule #58: Avoid the Douchemobile Episode 2x02: Rule#77: Don't Blow the Bubble Episode 2x03: Rule#8: Timing is Everything Episode 2x05: Rule #72: It's Never Too Late to Be a Mean Girl Episode 2x06: Rule #25: Beware the Second Chance Episode 2x08: Rule #79: Labels are for Canned Goods Episode 2x10: Rule #36: If You Can't Stand the Heat, you're Cooked Episode 2x11: Rule #118: Let Her Eat Cake Episode 2x13: Rule #59: "Happily Ever After" Is an Oxymoron
2015-2018	Girlfriends' Guide to Divorce	Written by	Episode 1x07: Rule #67: Don't Kill the Princess Episode 2x07: Rule #14: No Means... No Episode 2x12: Rule #876: Everything Does Not Happen for a Reason Episode 4x03: Rule #706: Let Them Eat Cupcakes Episode 5x03: Rule #97: It Takes Two to Stab yourself in the Butt
2017	Girlfriends' Guide to Divorce	Co-producer/Written by	Episode 3x05: Rule #99: Cook Naked
2016	UnREAL	Executive Story Editor	Episode 2x01: War Episode 2x02: Insurgent Episode 2x03: Guerilla Episode 2x05: Infiltration Episode 2x06: Casualty Episode 2x07: Ambush Episode 2x08: Fugitive
2016	UnREAL	Executive Story Editor/Written By	Episode 2x04: Treason
2018	Dietland	Supervising Producer/Teleplay By	Episode 1x06: Belly of the Beast
2018	Dietland	Supervising Producer	Episode 1x01: Pilot Episode 1x02: Tender Belly Episode 1x03: Y Not Episode 1x04: F... This Episode 1x05: Plum Tuckered Episode 1x07: Monster High Episode 1x08: Red Fatties Episode 1x09: Woman Down Episode 1x10: Bedwomb
2019	Watchmen	Supervising Producer	Episode 1x01: It's Summer and We're Running Out of Ice Episode 1x02: Martial Feats of Comanche Horsemanship
2020	Away	Co-Executive Producer	Episode 1x06: A Little Faith
2021 - 2022	The 45 Rules of Divorce	Arabic adaptation of Girlfriends' Guide to Divorce; Written by	الحلقة 1x07: قاعدة #67 إوعي تقتلي الأميرة اللي جواكي; Based on (Episode 1x07: Rule #67: Don't Kill the Princess) الحلقة 2x07: قاعدة #14 لاء يعني لاء; Based on (Episode 2x07: Rule #14: No Means... No) الحلقة 2x12: قاعدة #876 مش كل حاجة ليها سبب; Based on (Episode 2x12: Rule #876: Everything Does Not Happen for a Reason) الحلقة 3x05: قاعدة #99 سيبي نفسك; Based on (Episode 3x05: Rule #99: Cook Naked) الحلقة 4x03: قاعدة #706 متتنازليش أو ع الأقل متتنازليش كتير; Based on (Episode 4x03: Rule #706: Let Them Eat Cupcakes) الحلقة 5x03: قاعدة #97 مفيش أحسن م الصراحة; Based on (Episode 5x03: Rule #97: It Takes Two to Stab yourself in the Butt)
2022	Atlanta	Written by	Episode 3x02: Sinterklaas is Coming to Town Episode 4x05: Work Ethic!
2023	Swarm	Co-Creator	

== Selected works ==
- Nabers, Janine. "Juniper; Jubilee." Off Off Broadway Festival Plays, 33rd Series, edited by Thomas C. Dunn. New York: Samuel French, 2008 ISBN 9780573670367
- Nabers, Janine. Letters to Kurt, Playscripts Incorporated, 2012 ISBN 9781623844172
- Nabers, Janine. Decade: Twenty New Plays about 9/11 and Its Legacy, edited by Samual Adamson, London: Nick Hern Books, 2012 ISBN 9781848422308
- Nabers, Janine. Serial Black Face. New Haven: Yale University Press, 2015 ISBN 0300211376
- Nabers, Janine. "Serial Black Face." The Kilroys List: 97 Monologues and Scenes by Female and Trans Playwrights. Volume One, edited by Annah Feinberg for The Kilroys, New York: Theatre Communications Group, 2017 ISBN 9781559365352
