= List of Atlanta episodes =

Atlanta is an American comedy-drama television series created by Donald Glover that centers on college dropout and music manager Earnest "Earn" Marks (Glover) and rapper Paper Boi (Brian Tyree Henry) as they navigate the Atlanta rap scene. It also stars Lakeith Stanfield and Zazie Beetz.

The series premiered on September 6, 2016, on FX. The fourth and final season premiered on September 15, 2022. During the course of the series, 41 episodes of Atlanta aired over four seasons, between September 6, 2016, and November 10, 2022.

== Series overview ==
| Season | Episodes | Originally released | |
| Season | Episodes | First released | Last released |
|---|---|---|---|
| 1 | 10 | September 6, 2016 | November 1, 2016 |
| 2 | 11 | March 1, 2018 | May 10, 2018 |
| 3 | 10 | March 24, 2022 | May 19, 2022 |
| 4 | 10 | September 15, 2022 | November 10, 2022 |

== Episodes ==
=== Season 1 (2016) ===
| No. overall | No. in season | Title | Directed by | Written by | Original release date | Prod. code | U.S. viewers (millions) |
|---|---|---|---|---|---|---|---|
| 1 | 1 | "The Big Bang" | Hiro Murai | Donald Glover | September 6, 2016 | XAA01001 | 1.08 |
| 2 | 2 | "Streets on Lock" | Hiro Murai | Stephen Glover | September 6, 2016 | XAA01002 | 0.955 |
| 3 | 3 | "Go for Broke" | Hiro Murai | Stephen Glover | September 13, 2016 | XAA01003 | 1.07 |
| 4 | 4 | "The Streisand Effect" | Hiro Murai | Donald Glover | September 20, 2016 | XAA01004 | 0.920 |
| 5 | 5 | "Nobody Beats the Biebs" | Hiro Murai | Stephen Glover | September 27, 2016 | XAA01005 | 0.860 |
| 6 | 6 | "Value" | Donald Glover | Donald Glover & Stefani Robinson | October 4, 2016 | XAA01006 | 0.827 |
| 7 | 7 | "B.A.N." | Donald Glover | Donald Glover | October 11, 2016 | XAA01007 | 0.770 |
| 8 | 8 | "The Club" | Hiro Murai | Jamal Olori | October 18, 2016 | XAA01008 | 0.948 |
| 9 | 9 | "Juneteenth" | Janicza Bravo | Stefani Robinson | October 25, 2016 | XAA01009 | 0.651 |
| 10 | 10 | "The Jacket" | Hiro Murai | Stephen Glover | November 1, 2016 | XAA01010 | 0.786 |

=== Season 2: Robbin' Season (2018) ===
| No. overall | No. in season | Title | Directed by | Written by | Original release date | Prod. code | U.S. viewers (millions) |
|---|---|---|---|---|---|---|---|
| 11 | 1 | "Alligator Man" | Hiro Murai | Donald Glover | March 1, 2018 | XAA02001 | 0.851 |
| 12 | 2 | "Sportin' Waves" | Hiro Murai | Stephen Glover | March 8, 2018 | XAA02002 | 0.714 |
| 13 | 3 | "Money Bag Shawty" | Hiro Murai | Stephen Glover | March 15, 2018 | XAA02003 | 0.561 |
| 14 | 4 | "Helen" | Amy Seimetz | Taofik Kolade | March 22, 2018 | XAA02005 | 0.499 |
| 15 | 5 | "Barbershop" | Donald Glover | Stefani Robinson | March 29, 2018 | XAA02004 | 0.607 |
| 16 | 6 | "Teddy Perkins" | Hiro Murai | Donald Glover | April 5, 2018 | XAA02006 | 0.776 |
| 17 | 7 | "Champagne Papi" | Amy Seimetz | Ibra Ake | April 12, 2018 | XAA02007 | 0.694 |
| 18 | 8 | "Woods" | Hiro Murai | Stefani Robinson | April 19, 2018 | XAA02008 | 0.595 |
| 19 | 9 | "North of the Border" | Hiro Murai | Jamal Olori | April 26, 2018 | XAA02009 | 0.487 |
| 20 | 10 | "FUBU" | Donald Glover | Stephen Glover | May 3, 2018 | XAA02010 | 0.694 |
| 21 | 11 | "Crabs in a Barrel" | Hiro Murai | Stephen Glover | May 10, 2018 | XAA02011 | 0.553 |

=== Season 3 (2022) ===
| No. overall | No. in season | Title | Directed by | Written by | Original release date | Prod. code | U.S. viewers (millions) |
|---|---|---|---|---|---|---|---|
| 22 | 1 | "Three Slaps" | Hiro Murai | Stephen Glover | March 24, 2022 | XAA03001 | 0.310 |
| 23 | 2 | "Sinterklaas Is Coming to Town" | Hiro Murai | Janine Nabers | March 24, 2022 | XAA03002 | 0.288 |
| 24 | 3 | "The Old Man and the Tree" | Hiro Murai | Taofik Kolade | March 31, 2022 | XAA03004 | 0.284 |
| 25 | 4 | "The Big Payback" | Hiro Murai | Francesca Sloane | April 7, 2022 | XAA03009 | 0.260 |
| 26 | 5 | "Cancer Attack" | Hiro Murai | Jamal Olori | April 14, 2022 | XAA03007 | 0.290 |
| 27 | 6 | "White Fashion" | Ibra Ake | Ibra Ake | April 21, 2022 | XAA03006 | 0.203 |
| 28 | 7 | "Trini 2 De Bone" | Donald Glover | Jordan Temple | April 28, 2022 | XAA03005 | 0.152 |
| 29 | 8 | "New Jazz" | Hiro Murai | Donald Glover | May 5, 2022 | XAA03003 | 0.305 |
| 30 | 9 | "Rich Wigga, Poor Wigga" | Donald Glover | Donald Glover | May 12, 2022 | XAA03010 | 0.225 |
| 31 | 10 | "Tarrare" | Donald Glover | Stefani Robinson | May 19, 2022 | XAA03008 | 0.152 |

=== Season 4 (2022) ===
| No. overall | No. in season | Title | Directed by | Written by | Original release date | Prod. code | U.S. viewers (millions) |
|---|---|---|---|---|---|---|---|
| 32 | 1 | "The Most Atlanta" | Hiro Murai | Stephen Glover | September 15, 2022 | XAA04001 | 0.216 |
| 33 | 2 | "The Homeliest Little Horse" | Angela Barnes | Ibra Ake | September 15, 2022 | XAA04003 | 0.126 |
| 34 | 3 | "Born 2 Die" | Adamma Ebo | Jamal Olori | September 22, 2022 | XAA04002 | 0.174 |
| 35 | 4 | "Light Skinned-ed" | Hiro Murai | Stefani Robinson | September 29, 2022 | XAA04004 | 0.147 |
| 36 | 5 | "Work Ethic!" | Donald Glover | Janine Nabers | October 6, 2022 | XAA04005 | 0.117 |
| 37 | 6 | "Crank Dat Killer" | Hiro Murai | Stephen Glover | October 13, 2022 | XAA04006 | 0.253 |
| 38 | 7 | "Snipe Hunt" | Hiro Murai | Francesca Sloane | October 20, 2022 | XAA04007 | 0.114 |
| 39 | 8 | "The Goof Who Sat By the Door" | Donald Glover | Francesca Sloane & Karen Joseph Adcock | October 27, 2022 | XAA04009 | 0.190 |
| 40 | 9 | "Andrew Wyeth. Alfred's World." | Hiro Murai | Taofik Kolade | November 3, 2022 | XAA04008 | 0.126 |
| 41 | 10 | "It Was All a Dream" | Hiro Murai | Donald Glover | November 10, 2022 | XAA04010 | 0.223 |
