= Atlanta season 3 =

Season of television series

Atlanta
- Season 3
- Promotional poster
- Showrunner: Donald Glover
- Starring: Donald Glover; Brian Tyree Henry; Lakeith Stanfield; Zazie Beetz
- No. of episodes: 10

Release
- Original network: FX
- Original release: March 24 – May 19, 2022

Season chronology
- ← Previous; Robbin' Season Next → Season 4

The third season of the American television series Atlanta premiered on March 24, 2022, on FX. The season is produced by Gilga, 343 Incorporated, MGMT. Entertainment, and FXP, with Donald Glover, Paul Simms, Dianne McGunigle, Stephen Glover, Hiro Murai, and Stefani Robinson serving as executive producers. Donald Glover serves as creator and showrunner, writing two episodes and directing three episodes of the season.

The season was ordered in June 2018. It stars Glover, Brian Tyree Henry, LaKeith Stanfield, and Zazie Beetz. The series follows Earn during his daily life in Atlanta, Georgia, as he tries to redeem himself in the eyes of his ex-girlfriend Van, who is also the mother of his daughter Lottie; as well as his parents and his cousin Alfred, who raps under the stage name "Paper Boi"; and Darius, Alfred's eccentric right-hand man. The season takes place in Europe, with the characters in the middle of a European tour. The European cities featured throughout the season include Amsterdam, London, and Paris. The season also explores events happening back in America outside of the core characters in several stand-alone episodes with a vignette format. Fans and critics have speculated that these episodes are depictions of Earn's dreams. These episodes take place in Atlanta and New York.

The season premiered on March 24, 2022, on FX. The season premiere received 0.310 million viewers with a 0.1 ratings share in the 18–49 demographics. The season ended on May 20, 2022, with an average of 0.25 million viewers, which was a 61% decrease from the previous season. The season has received critical acclaim, with television commentators lauding the performances, directing, writing, and storytelling. However, the standalone episodes have garnered a more mixed response as the season has gone on; whilst they were initially praised, as they have progressed criticisms have gone towards the abrupt changes in settings, the anthological nature of each episode, as well as the main cast not appearing in any of the standalone episodes. In August 2019, two and a half years before the season started airing, FX renewed the series for a fourth and final season.

== Cast and characters ==
=== Main ===
- Donald Glover as Earnest "Earn" Marks
- Brian Tyree Henry as Alfred "Paper Boi" Miles
- LaKeith Stanfield as Darius
- Zazie Beetz as Vanessa "Van" Keefer

=== Guest ===
- Tobias Segal (Note: Also had an uncredited role in "Tarrare".) as Earnest Marks / E / White Earn
- Laura Dreyfuss as Amber
- Justin Bartha as Marshall Johnson
- Chet Hanks as Curtis
- Liam Neeson as himself
- George Wallace as Greg
- Kevin Samuels as Robert S. Lee
- Alexander Skarsgård as himself
- Adriyan Rae as Candice
- Xosha Roquemore as Xosha
- Jai Paul as himself

== Episodes ==
No. overall	No. in season	Title	Directed by	Written by	Original release date	Prod. code	U.S. viewers (millions)
22	1	"Three Slaps"	Hiro Murai	Stephen Glover	March 24, 2022	XAA03001	0.310
Two friends, a white man named Earnest and an unnamed black man, go fishing on Lake Lanier, where they discuss its history and what it means to be white. Earnest reveals himself to be a spirit and black hands drag the black man under the lake. The sequence is revealed to be the dream of Loquareeous, a black schoolboy who gets in trouble at his predominantly white school for dancing on a desk. A teacher witnesses his grandfather slapping him, and his mother throws him out of the house when child protective services come. He is forced to move in with a white lesbian couple with three black foster children that are clearly terrified of them, and the couple begins behaving strangely, shortening his name to "Larry" and forcing the children to work in their garden. When a black CPS agent comes and is appalled at their poor living conditions, the couple kills her and takes the children out on the road. Realizing they are planning to kill the children and themselves, Loquareeous smuggles the other kids out when they pull over and leaps out of the car just before it drives into Lake Lanier. He is welcomed home by his mother and eats some spaghetti that she left for him, only to turn around when he hears something behind him. In a hotel room, Earn wakes up in bed with a white woman, implying the events of the episode to be his dream. This episode is inspired by the real-life 2018 murder-suicide of the Hart family. Closing song: "Brown Rice" by Don Cherry
23	2	"Sinterklaas Is Coming to Town"	Hiro Murai	Janine Nabers	March 24, 2022	XAA03002	0.288
Earn rushes to the Copenhagen airport to make it to Amsterdam on time, where Al has been arrested because of a pair of groupies that trashed his hotel room while fighting. They notice that Amsterdam is observing the tradition of Zwarte Piet, a Christmas figure, by donning the character's traditional blackface. Al refuses to perform at a venue when he sees his white audience in blackface, forcing Earn to flee from the vengeful owner, who beats up a random man in blackface after being unable to find him. While out thrift shopping, Van and Darius find an address in a coat that leads them on a scavenger hunt, ending when they arrive at a living funeral for a man that resembles Tupac Shakur. Van delivers a heartfelt eulogy when asked, only for the man to be violently suffocated by an apparatus attached to his bed. Title card: Baggage scanner Opening song: "Maiysha" by Miles Davis Closing song: "At the Hotel" by Eunice Collins
24	3	"The Old Man and the Tree"	Hiro Murai	Taofik Kolade	March 31, 2022	XAA03004	0.284
The group goes to a house party in London hosted by eccentric billionaire Fernando, who is obsessed with ghosts and the large tree growing in the center of his property. An Asian woman reacts apprehensively when Darius says hello to her based on her preconceived notions of black men, causing a white partygoer named Socks to rally a mob towards her against Darius' wishes. Earn meets an investor whose eagerness to please black people is being taken advantage of by a young black artist, but decides to join in scamming him after a talk with Al. He notices Van is behaving strangely and tries to talk to her, but she brushes him off. Fernando invites Al to play poker with him, but refuses to hand over his money when Al wins. Enraged, Al attempts to cut down the tree, forcing Earn to drag him out and leave with Darius, the three being driven away by Socks. Title card: Wall of a house Opening song: "Tension" by Central Cee Closing song: "The World Might Fall Over" by MonoMono
25	4	"The Big Payback"	Hiro Murai	Francesca Sloane	April 7, 2022	XAA03009	0.260
As black people begin suing white people whose ancestors owned theirs in the past, white Marshall Johnson is sued by black Sheniqua Johnson, losing him his house and ruining his chances of getting back with his estranged wife. His black coworker encourages him to sit down with Sheniqua and negotiate, but his white coworkers tell him to fight against her, which yields little success. Forced to move into a hotel, Marshall meets Earnest, who has also been sued and claims that they are now "free" from the "curse" of whiteness. As Marshall has a change of heart looking at pictures of Sheniqua with her children, Earnest shoots himself in the head and falls into the hotel pool. Some time later, Marshall works as a waiter, where a portion of his check is given to Sheniqua. The kitchen staff is revealed to be mixed race while the waiters are all white, and none of the clientele are. Closing song: "Les Fleurs" by Minnie Riperton
26	5	"Cancer Attack"	Hiro Murai	Jamal Olori	April 14, 2022	XAA03007	0.290
Al's phone goes missing in Budapest after a concert, the only suspects being a young, cancer-stricken fan, and the strange nephew of the venue owner, Wiley. As he unnerves Earn by quickly deducing the unease he feels about his place amongst black people, Al asks to talk to him alone and explains that he has not written a new song in months, having been struck by inspiration before the show and recording a new one on the missing phone. As he expresses fear that he may never get his passion for production back if he does not get the phone, Wiley performs one of his own songs for Al, who is quietly affected but outwardly unimpressed. The group leaves the venue on a bus, only for Socks to pull out the phone without anyone seeing and throw it in the trash. Title card: Wall behind a merchandise table Opening song: "Doja" by $NOT Closing song: "Dedicated to the One I Love" by The Temprees
27	6	"White Fashion"	Ibra Ake	Ibra Ake	April 21, 2022	XAA03006	0.203
A London-based fashion company is embroiled in controversy after releasing a jersey with a cartoon raccoon on one side and "CENTRAL PARK 5" on the other, forcing them to bring in Al to join their "diversity advisory committee." He realizes the group is full of black people who coast off tragedies and injustices, and his idea for an ad campaign promoting community that he stole from Earn is then stolen by the company. Darius takes the company's white head of hospitality out for jollof rice, which she enjoys so much that she buys the restaurant out and reopens it with a more corporate identity. Earn encounters Van in a hotel, pretending to be married to her to keep her from getting in trouble, and the two end up having sex. He wakes up to find her gone. Title card: Subway station platform Opening song: "Fake Jersey" by Teni Closing song: "Next Time / Humble Pie" by The Internet
28	7	"Trini 2 De Bone"	Donald Glover	Jordan Temple	April 28, 2022	XAA03005	0.152
In New York City, a wealthy white family's Trini nanny dies, but the parents are only concerned about finding a more convenient one. Their toddler asks to go to her funeral, where they are treated with passive hostility and witness the strange goings-on, including meeting a white man who refers to himself as a Trini, having been practically raised by the nanny. Her daughter gives a eulogy, in which she reveals her mother never had time to raise her and her siblings because she was so busy with the children of other people. Returning home, the father opens a package addressed to the nanny that keeps getting sent back to the apartment when he tries to return it, which contains school photos of his son and the nanny at an event he and his wife were supposed to attend. Closing song: "Trini to De Bone"
29	8	"New Jazz"	Hiro Murai	Donald Glover	May 5, 2022	XAA03003	0.305
Al and Darius take space cakes while in Amsterdam, passing by a convulsing man in a Goofy hat that Darius warns Al not to be like. They get separated, and a group of erratic white fans chase Al into an art gallery. He meets a woman named Lorraine, who seems antagonistic and pointedly asks him who owns his masters, which Al can't answer. Convinced to trust her, Lorraine gives him a Goofy hat and takes him to the "Cancel Club" to meet her friends, referring to Al as "New Jazz" to get him inside. He meets Liam Neeson at the bar, and they have a discussion about his controversial comment until he asserts that he did not hate black people but now does, warning him that they are enemies as he leaves. Lorraine pulls him out of the club before he can be forced to perform for them, and they argue until he loses control of his limbs and collapses, being passed by himself and Darius. He awakes in a hotel room and learns from Earn that he owns his own masters. Title card: Sticker Closing song: "Stormy" by The Meters
30	9	"Rich Wigga, Poor Wigga"	Donald Glover	Donald Glover	May 12, 2022	XAA03010	0.225
Mixed race, white presenting high schooler Aaron struggles with financial woes regarding college, unsure if he will be able to go with his friends and girlfriend. Billionaire Robert S. Lee, an alumnus of Aaron's school, declares that he is going to pay the tuition of every black student in the school, but will determine their blackness based on a series of trials. Aaron tries out, but is casually and jovially dismissed by Lee. After his girlfriend leaves him for a blacker man, Aaron angrily builds a homemade flamethrower and goes to the school, intent on burning it down, only to be confronted by another student who was also rejected by Lee. They argue and fight, with Aaron narrowly escaping death after the student is shot by the police, having his medical bills and tuition covered by Lee as he is now considered black. One year later, Aaron works at an electronics store, displaying a significantly blacker style and mannerisms. He encounters his old girlfriend and admits he has never been more attracted to her in his life, smirking at the camera. Opening song: "La Pelle Finale" by Lalo Schifrin Closing song: "Hangin' On a String" by Loose Ends
31	10	"Tarrare"	Donald Glover	Stefani Robinson	May 19, 2022	XAA03008	0.152
Van's friend Candice goes to Paris as part of an escort job with her friend and the friend's cousin when she encounters Van, who is speaking with a French accent and seems to refuse to acknowledge her life in Atlanta. She takes them to visit her sexual partner Alexander Skarsgård, who she incriminates by planting drugs in his hotel room, claiming to a confused Candice that it is all part of their relationship. The group goes to pick up a package, which Van finds is empty, confronting the man who was supposed to deliver it and nearly killing him with a stale baguette for it. She brings the recovered package to her boyfriend, a chef, and reveals to Candice that the contents are human hands that her boyfriend cooks and serves to his customers, amongst them Skarsgård and Candice's friends. Candice's friends realize what is happening and leave, while Van snaps out of her bizarre behavior when Candice mentions Lottie. She admits that she experienced a moment of suicidal ideation while in Atlanta and fled to Paris, and Candice consoles her. Candice's friend's cousin takes her escort job, urinating on the client until he pleads with her to stop. In a post-credits scene, Earn receives a bag with his name on it after returning from Europe, revealed to be Earnest's. Title card: Cuts of meat Closing song: "Splash Waterfalls" by Ludacris

== Production ==
=== Development ===
The series was renewed for a third season in June 2018. FX Networks and FX Productions programming president Nick Grad commented, “Atlanta is phenomenal, achieving and exceeding what few television series have done. With Atlanta Robbin' Season, Donald and his collaborators elevated the series to even greater heights, building on the enormous success of their award-winning first season. We're grateful to the producers and our extraordinary cast and crew for achieving this level of excellence, and we share the excitement with our audience about the third season knowing they will continue to take us to unexpected and thrilling places."

In August 2019, FX confirmed that the season would consist of eight episodes. In January 2020, FX upped the episode order to ten episodes.

=== Writing ===
Before production started, Stephen Glover said that the season would focus on more female-centric stories, "I think we have some cool ideas in season three that'll put some more women on screen. There's a very specific perspective from the Atlanta woman that I think we're gonna explore in season three."

Regarding about setting the season in Europe, Donald Glover said "It's our point of view; it's not really about the place. Although in Season 4, it makes a very heavy resurgence, as far as the actual place. Atlanta is a state of mind. Europe solidified how we felt while writing Season 3. Director Hiro Murai calls it our maximum season."

In 2020, Donald Glover drew attention when he claimed that the third and fourth season "are going to be some of the best television ever made. Sopranos only ones who can touch us." When questioned about the statement, Glover said "I'm not backing down from that shit. I'm holding my nuts out on that shit. I just want audiences to know this shit is good. It's high quality shit."

Part of the season is divided on anthology episodes, consisting of "Three Slaps", "The Big Payback", "Trini 2 De Bone", and "Rich Wigga, Poor Wigga". Executive producer Stefani Robinson explained the decision, "it just sort of felt like the natural progression of what we wanted to try creatively. Donald has done such a good job of making us feel like the show can really be whatever we want it to be in terms of creativity. He's referred to it a couple of times as a playground or at least this is how it feels. You don't have to be shackled to this idea of making a more traditional sitcom or comedy structure. This is something very different."

=== Filming ===
In January 2019, Zazie Beetz stated that filming for the season would be delayed due to the cast's schedule. In August 2019, FX confirmed that the season would start filming on spring 2020, filming back-to-back with the fourth season. However, production was shut down amidst the COVID-19 pandemic. Production was set to resume in April 2021, with the series planning to film in Europe. Donald Glover confirmed that production on the season started on April 2, 2021. In August 2021, FX confirmed that the season wrapped filming.

== Release ==
=== Broadcast ===
In February 2019, Chairman of FX, John Landgraf, confirmed that the season would be delayed and that it would miss eligibility for the 71st Primetime Emmy Awards. In January 2020, Landgraf said that the season would air in January 2021, with the fourth season airing later that year. However, due to production pausing due to the COVID-19 pandemic, Landgraf said the season would not be ready for its intended January 2021 premiere date, later signaling that the season would premiere in 2022. In December 2021, FX finally announced that the season would premiere on March 24, 2022.

=== Marketing ===
In October 2021, a teaser trailer for the season was released. A new trailer debuted in December 2021. The first two episodes premiered at the 2022 South by Southwest Film Festival on March 19, 2022.

== Reception ==
=== Critical reception ===
Atlanta season 3: Critical reception by episode
Atlanta season 3 (2022): Percentage of positive critics' reviews tracked by the website Rotten Tomatoes

Based upon the first two episodes given to critics, the third season has received critical acclaim. The season has a score of 93 out of 100 on Metacritic, based on 24 critics, indicating "universal acclaim". On Rotten Tomatoes, it has an approval rating of 96%, based on 130 reviews, with an average rating of 8.6/10. The site's critical consensus reads, "Atlanta takes Paper Boi and his entourage out of Georgia, but this inspired third season proves that the more things change, the more they stay weird."

Daniel Fienberg of The Hollywood Reporter gave it a highly positive review and wrote, "no other show on TV is doing the thing that Atlanta does, with its doses of humor, surrealism, horror, travelogue and hip-hop as genre-blending starting points for an uncomfortable exploration of racial identity in America." Liz Shannon Miller of Consequence wrote that the series "remains as ethereal and shocking and fascinating as ever" and "in just the first two episodes of Season 3, the creative team delivers at least a half-dozen moments you'll never forget. Atlanta is a gift."

=== Accolades ===
Award	Category	Nominees	Result	Ref.
TCA Awards	Outstanding Achievement in Comedy	Atlanta	Nominated	
Primetime Emmy Awards	Outstanding Lead Actor in a Comedy Series	Donald Glover	Nominated	
Primetime Emmy Awards	Outstanding Directing for a Comedy Series	Hiro Murai (for "New Jazz")	Nominated	
