= Tarrare (Atlanta) =

- Atlanta episode
- Episode no.: Season 3 Episode 10
- Directed by: Donald Glover
- Written by: Stefani Robinson
- Cinematography by: Stephen Murphy
- Editing by: Kyle Reiter
- Production code: XAA03008
- Original air date: May 19, 2022
- Running time: 36 minutes

Guest appearances
- Alexander Skarsgård as himself; Shanice Castro as Shanice; Adriyan Rae as Candice; Xosha Roquemore as Xosha

Episode chronology
← Previous "Rich Wigga, Poor Wigga"	Next → "The Most Atlanta"
- Atlanta season 3

"Tarrare" is the tenth episode and season finale of the third season of the American comedy-drama television series Atlanta. It is the 31st overall episode of the series and was written by executive producer Stefani Robinson and directed by series creator and main actor Donald Glover. It was first broadcast on FX in the United States on May 19, 2022.

The series is set in Atlanta and follows Earnest "Earn" Marks, as he tries to redeem himself in the eyes of his ex-girlfriend Van, who is also the mother of their daughter Lottie; as well as his parents and his cousin Alfred, who raps under the stage name "Paper Boi"; and Darius, Alfred's eccentric right-hand man. For the season, the characters find themselves in Europe in the middle of a concert tour. In the episode, Van's old friend Candice finds her in Paris and is astounded by her new personality and her strange hobbies.

According to Nielsen Media Research, the episode was seen by an estimated 0.152 million household viewers and gained a 0.1 ratings share among adults aged 18–49. The episode received critical acclaim, with critics praising the writing, Zazie Beetz's performance, Alexander Skarsgård's guest appearance, humor and emotional tone. However, some were critical of the decision to not include the rest of the characters, as well as relegating Earn to a post credits scene, feeling it did not work as a season finale.

== Plot ==
In Paris, Van’s friend Candice (Adriyan Rae) and her friends Shanice (Shanice Castro) and Xosha (Xosha Roquemore) are chatting at a coffee shop. Candice then discovers Van (Zazie Beetz) nearby and greets her, discovering that she is now speaking exclusively with a French accent. She takes them to her apartment where Candice is surprised to see that she is a model in magazines and has a partner named Marcel.

Van then takes them to a hotel apartment to see her friend, actor Alexander Skarsgård, implying that they have a sexual relationship. As Skarsgård dances and starts undressing, Van plants some drugs on his bed before leaving with her friends. She informs the receptionist that Skarsgård may be dying from the drugs, claiming to Candice that it's part of a game with him. They then go to a housing project where Van plans to pick up a package using a key she got from Skarsgård, but she discovers that it's missing, deducing that a person named Emilio is responsible. The group also find their mopeds' tires have been stabbed with a knife just as a gang shows up, referring to Van as "Tarrare". Van states that Tarrare is "the man who ate the baby.” However, the gang leaves when they see a nearby fight, allowing the girls to flee.

The group heads to an art gallery where Van finds and confronts Emilio. Emilio tries to explain the missing package, but Van takes out a stale baguette and brutally attacks Emilio. A bloodied Emilio reveals where the missing package is, allowing Van and her friends to take it and leave the gallery. They then arrive at a party where Candice expresses her discomfort with Van's behavior to Shanice and Xosha, but they actually like and are intrigued by Van. Skarsgård appears and confronts Van, as the incident at the hotel had serious repercussions for his career. Van responds by spitting on him, and Skarsgård is later seen masturbating in the bathroom. Van starts working in the kitchen with Marcel, who also works as a chef there. Candice confronts Van about her new life, but Van brushes her off. Candice also realizes that the packages Van picked up contained human hands, which Marcel then proceeds to cook for the guests as a meal named "Les mains", with the guests eating while wearing a large napkin over their heads.

Candice asks Van about her old life and her plans, with Van revealing that she intends to marry Marcel and get French citizenship. But when Candice asks about Lottie, Van is taken aback. She has a breakdown and starts trashing the kitchen, scaring Marcel away. Her screams are heard by Shanice and Xosha, who remove their napkins and are disgusted to find that they are eating human hands. They leave just as Skarsgård arrives excitedly to eat. Near the Seine, Van talks with Candice on a bench, expressing how she felt lost and passively suicidal for a while, deeming herself a bad mother to Lottie. Candice consoles her and Van concludes that she needs to go home. In the final scene, Shanice visits a man for an assignment: urinating on him while looking out at the Eiffel Tower.

In a post-credits scene, Earn (Donald Glover) receives a missing duffel bag, despite being certain that he didn't forget anything on his trip. He opens the bag and finds pill bottles, a Deftones shirt, and a white family portrait. Earn leaves the room while the camera zooms in on the portrait, revealing the white man who shares his name (Tobias Segal, previously seen in "Three Slaps" and "The Big Payback").

== Production ==
=== Development ===
"Yo Tarrare was a real person. Wild. They gotta stop biting these better shows tho."

— Official description in the press release for the episode.

In April 2022, FX announced that the tenth episode of the season would be titled "Tarrare" and that it would be written by executive producer Stefani Robinson and directed by series creator and main actor Donald Glover. This was Robinson's fifth writing credit, and Glover's seventh directing credit.

=== Casting ===
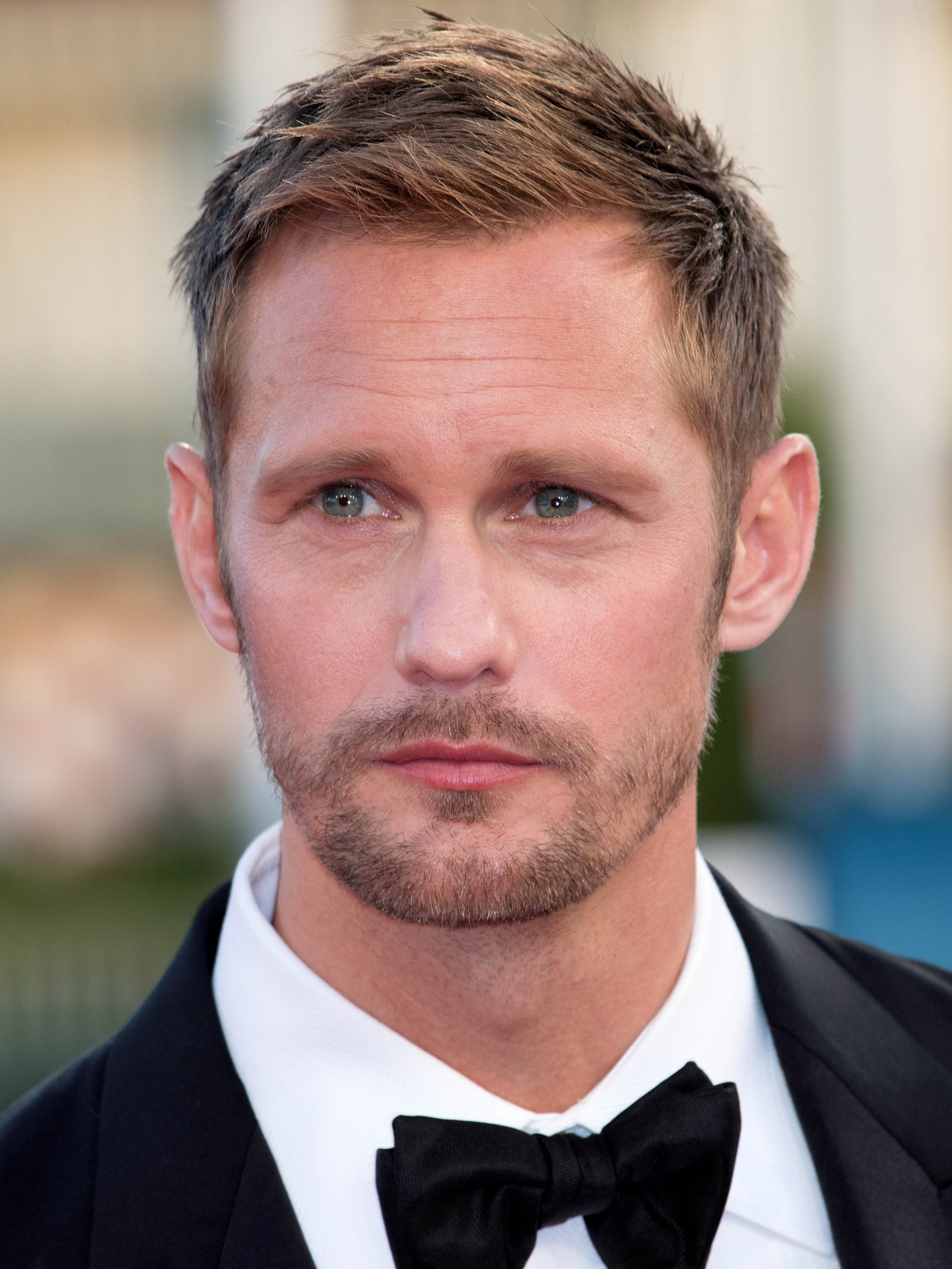
Alexander Skarsgård guest stars in the episode.

The episode featured a guest appearance by Alexander Skarsgård, who appears as himself. Donald Glover personally contacted Skarsgård, who agreed to appear in the episode. In March 2022, Glover stated that he hoped Ryan Gosling could guest star on the series, with Stefani Robinson confirming that Gosling was originally contacted to play Skarsgård's part. Robinson also said, "He just really threw himself in there. It didn't seem like he was shy about doing what was written. If anything, he added more to it." As part of his appearance, Skarsgård said he would perform a half-naked dance as long as he could wear "leopard-print underwear."

=== Writing ===
The episode is titled after Tarrare, a French showman and soldier, noted for his unusual appetite and eating habits. The A.V. Club offered an analysis on the episode, "The symbolism of Tarrare, that cannibalistic friend of sex workers and thieves, works overtime. It's an obscure enough reference that it doesn't seem, um, heavy-handed. Van has herself been hanging around a gang of people who are both ripe for exploitation (and being eaten alive) and have access to more money than they probably should, including a friend who does sex work." Zazie Beetz offered her own interpretation, "In some ways I feel like, again, this goes back to Van. The glutton of consuming all these different things to try to mask the pain or to be something else or to be someone else."

The writers planned the episode as the flexibility of the season would allow them to delve into bottle episodes. The writers also wanted an episode focused on Van, where they could explain her character's presence in Europe. Episode writer Stefani Robinson explained that they decide to give the final episode to Van, explaining "I think ending with Van and putting a fine point on what she was feeling and why she was feeling it distills the experience they're all having in Europe. It's been chaotic for all the characters. They're in the wilderness a little bit." Beetz also said, "We wanted to end this season or end that episode with the feeling of some things have been addressed, but not necessarily solved."

The post-credits scene bring back "Earn" (Tobias Segal), who appeared in "Three Slaps" and "The Big Payback". Robinson suggested the anthology episodes may be set on "some dream-like plane", but decided to connect the man to Earn to suggest that "the stories we've been seeing actually can be very real. There's some crossover here. These bottle episodes aren't so random, the way that a lot of people are reacting to them. They exist as the sort of subtext of everything that we're seeing." She further added, "Our experiences feel so different that we can't relate, we don't understand, and then that's what we claim to do. At the end, what I appreciate about it is that it's a reminder: You can be in Europe and you still carry this experience with you. It'll always come back to you, and we're all kind of tied together in that experience, as well." Jordan Taliha McDonald of Vulture compared it to the film Watermelon Man, where a white salesman wakes up to find that he now turned into a black man, "Are Black Earn and white Earn inverses that follow one another? Is white Earn just Glover's voice disguised in another character?"

== Reception ==
=== Viewers ===
The episode was watched by 0.152 million viewers, earning a 0.1 in the 18-49 rating demographics on the Nielson ratings scale. This means that 0.1 percent of all households with televisions watched the episode. This was a 33% decrease from the previous episode, which was watched by 0.225 million viewers with a 0.1 in the 18-49 demographics.

=== Critical reviews ===
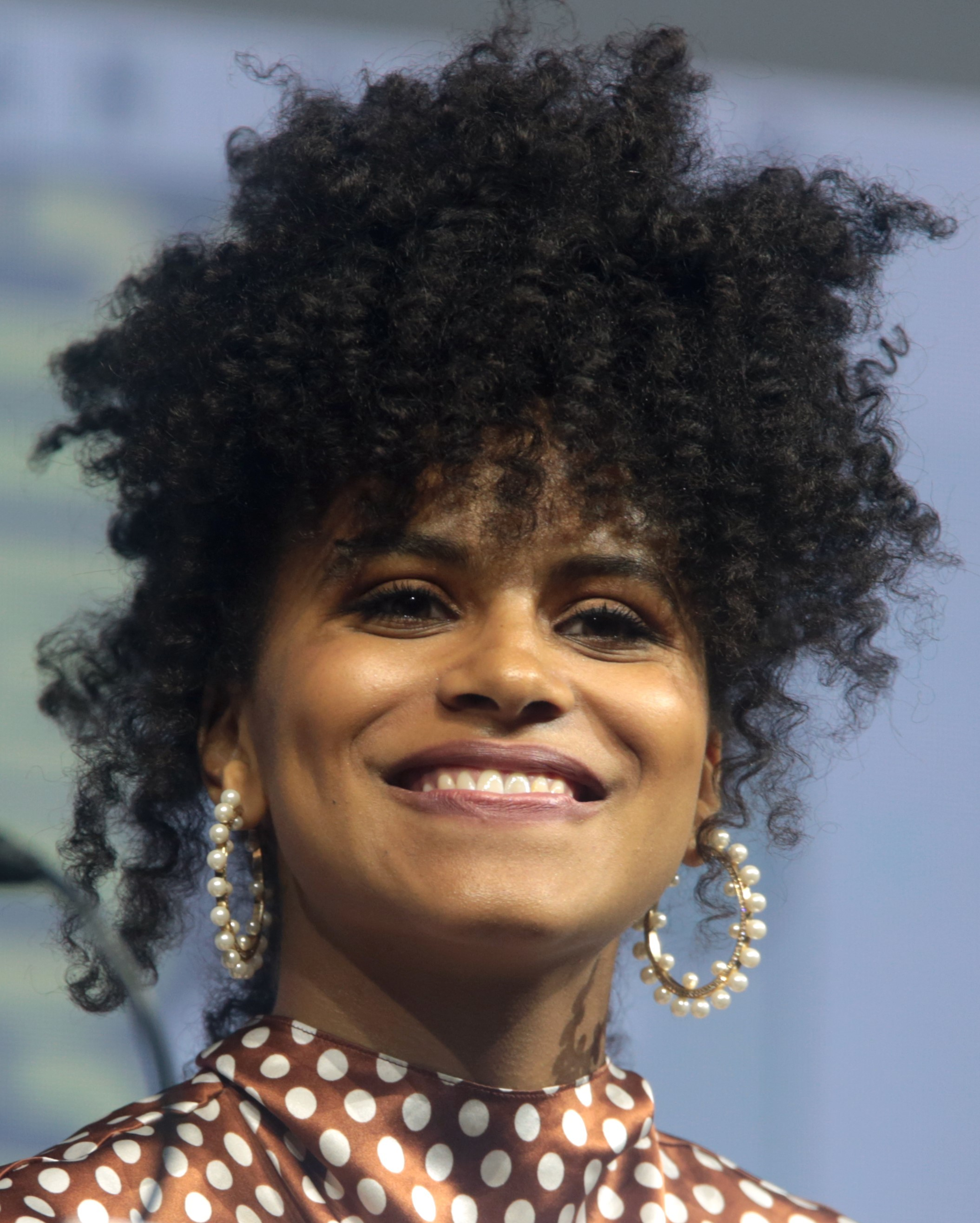
Zazie Beetz's performance in the episode received critical acclaim.

"Tarrare" received critical acclaim. The review aggregator website Rotten Tomatoes reported a 100% approval rating with an average rating of 10/10 for the episode, based on 7 reviews.

Michael Martin of The A.V. Club gave the episode an "A" and writing, "Is this fair to those characters and the viewer? That's a question for the season, but not this episode. Some people who love TV get most excited when a show breaks boundaries of content or format. Others are primarily concerned with characters and their care and feeding. By those criteria, this season was thrilling and frustrating. Also by those criteria, the finale was a complete success. Van (and Beetz) got a day in the sun, and a wealthy Frenchman got peed on under the moonlight."

Alan Sepinwall of Rolling Stone wrote, "'Tarrare' is not just a hilarious closing note for Season Three, but a conclusion of the closest thing we've had to an ongoing story arc."

Jordan Taliha McDonald of Vulture gave the episode a perfect 5 star rating out of 5 and wrote, "My primary regret is that this season did not allow us more time for Van's discovery of the artistry within her. The canvas awaits." Israel Daramola of The Ringer wrote, "For however mixed and jumbled its messaging and attempts at controversy may have been, there's still enough that makes Atlanta appointment television. Whatever story line the show claimed to be starting from back in Season 1, it has since transitioned into fully visualizing the id of its creative mastermind and his collaborators. This is Donald Glover's ride and we're all just along for it, wherever he decides to go next."

Deshawn Thomas of /Film wrote, "While there were plenty of funny and well-executed moments, and I enjoyed multiple episodes despite what I felt were some questionable and disappointing elements and choices, I feel this finale was a fitting end to a season that was equal parts entertaining and uneven in terms of execution and intent. It's not that I didn't 'get' it — I just didn't always like it, even as a huge fan of absurdist humor and addressing things that make people uncomfortable, both of which Atlanta does with varying degrees of success." Kyndall Cunningham of The Daily Beast wrote, "While tonight's finale felt like a strange way to close out the season, it's a relief to end on a well-done, compelling piece of work re-centering the show's central players, regardless of whether it makes sense. It's likely that most fans will walk away from this season wishing Stefani Robinson was more involved."

=== Accolades ===
TVLine named Zazie Beetz the "Performer of the Week" for the week of May 21, 2022, for her performance in the episode. The site wrote, "If acting is the art of reinventing yourself, in a way, then Beetz put on the ultimate acting performance in the FX comedy's Season 3 finale this week. She showed us a shockingly different side of Van as Earn's normally soft-spoken ex took center stage for once, leading her friends on a wild Parisian adventure before coming clean and revealing the deep pain she’s been masking."
