= New Jazz =

New Jazz may refer to:

- Nu jazz, a subgenre of jazz music.
- Prestige Records, initially known as New Jazz. Later used for the name of a Prestige subsidiary label.
- "New Jazz" (Atlanta), an episode from Atlanta's third season.
