= Jennifer Hart =

Jennifer Hart may refer to:

- Jennifer Hart, co-lead character of the American TV series Hart to Hart, played by Stefanie Powers
- Jennifer Hart (murderer), perpetrator of the Hart family murders

== See also ==
- Jenifer Hart
