= The Big Payback (Atlanta) =

- Atlanta episode
- Episode no.: Season 3 Episode 4
- Directed by: Hiro Murai
- Written by: Francesca Sloane
- Cinematography by: Stephen Murphy
- Production code: XAA03009
- Original air date: April 7, 2022
- Running time: 35 minutes

Guest appearances
- Justin Bartha as Marshall Johnson; Tobias Segal as Earnest

Episode chronology
← Previous "The Old Man and the Tree"	Next → "Cancer Attack"
- Atlanta season 3

"The Big Payback" is the fourth episode of the third season of the American comedy-drama television series Atlanta. It is the 25th overall episode of the series and was written by supervising producer Francesca Sloane, and directed by executive producer Hiro Murai. It was first broadcast on FX in the United States on April 7, 2022.

The series is set in Atlanta and follows Earnest "Earn" Marks, as he tries to redeem himself in the eyes of his ex-girlfriend Van, who is also the mother of his daughter Lottie; as well as his parents and his cousin Alfred, who raps under the stage name "Paper Boi"; and Darius, Alfred's eccentric right-hand man. For the season, the characters find themselves in Europe in the middle of a concert tour. The episode focuses on a dream being had by Earn of a man named Marshall Johnson, portrayed by Justin Bartha, whose life changes when a woman sues him for reparations for slavery. None of the main cast appears in the episode, with Bartha serving as the protagonist of the episode.

According to Nielsen Media Research, the episode was seen by an estimated 0.260 million household viewers and gained a 0.1 ratings share among adults aged 18–49. The episode received generally positive reviews from critics, who praised Bartha's and Tobias Segal's performances and the writing, directing and social commentary, although some were divided on the execution of the subject matter, as well as the seemingly standalone nature of the episode.

== Plot ==
At a coffee shop, a man named Marshall Johnson (Justin Bartha) waits in line while listening to Radiolab via AirPods. The barista tells a Black man that she will serve Marshall first. After he gets his order, he gets back to his car, where he takes out a package of madeleines that he accidentally stole from the shop. As he drives off, another car follows him. He then visits his separated wife, Natalie, to take his daughter, Katie, to school.

While leaving her at school, Marshall hears a story on the radio, about a black man who sued a Tesla investor as his ancestors enslaved his forebears. At his office, Marshall and his colleagues are informed that the company is preparing for layoffs and the company is also being put under investigation for similar claims to the Tesla investor. Marshall's white colleagues are scared of the implications and they are researching their family trees to see if their ancestors were slave owners, while his black colleagues are seen celebrating the events. As Marshall exits his office, he finds a white colleague crying in the parking lot.

After picking up Katie, she questions if they are racist and ever owned slaves, which Marshall denies, remarking that as their ancestors were Austro-Hungarian slaves during the Byzantine Empire and he wouldn't demand any payment for that. That night, Marshall is visited by a black woman named Sheniqua Johnson (Melissa Youngblood), who is suing him as his family owned her ancestors. She then enters his house by herself, livestreaming it and demanding $3 million, prompting Marshall to kick her out in front of Katie. The next day at the office, Marshall sees that most of the black employees are absent and even sees a white man wearing a shirt that reads "I owned slaves" as part of losing a lawsuit. He is further humiliated when Sheniqua shows up at the parking lot demanding money.

Marshall consults with a black coworker, who advises him to just admit to his family's mistake, meet with her one-on-one and pay her as much as he can, and she will honestly drop the issue. Ignoring this advice, he consults his white coworkers, who tell him to instead contest the lawsuit. Natalie contacts Marshall, saying she does not want to be affected by his connections and wants to finalize the divorce. When Marshall returns to his home, Sheniqua and her friends chase him off and he checks into a hotel.

He laments his situation as he goes downstairs to the hotel lobby. There, he meets a white man named Earnest "E" (Tobias Segal), who is in the same situation. (Note: E previously appeared in the opening scene of "Three Slaps", a dream within a dream being had by Earnest "Earn" Marks (Donald Glover), suggesting the events of "The Big Payback" are also a dream Earn is having.) E explains how he learned a lesson from his grandfather, viewing slavery not as past, but as a "cruel unavoidable ghost." He states they will be fine then steps outside and commits suicide by shooting himself in the head.

The scene then transitions to a Hispanic man arriving to his job at a restaurant. One of the employees is revealed to be Marshall, who has part of his salary garnished as "restitution taxes" to Sheniqua. The employees then start working, showing that most of them are people of color. Marshall then takes a dish and takes it to a black family; the camera zooms out to reveal that the waitstaff is mostly white and the diners are almost exclusively people of color.

== Production ==
=== Development ===
"I was legit scared watching this."

— Official description in the press release for the episode.

In March 2022, FX announced that the fourth episode of the season would be titled "The Big Payback" and that it would be written by supervising producer Francesca Sloane, and directed by executive producer Hiro Murai. This was Sloane's first writing credit, and Murai's eighteenth directing credit.

=== Casting ===
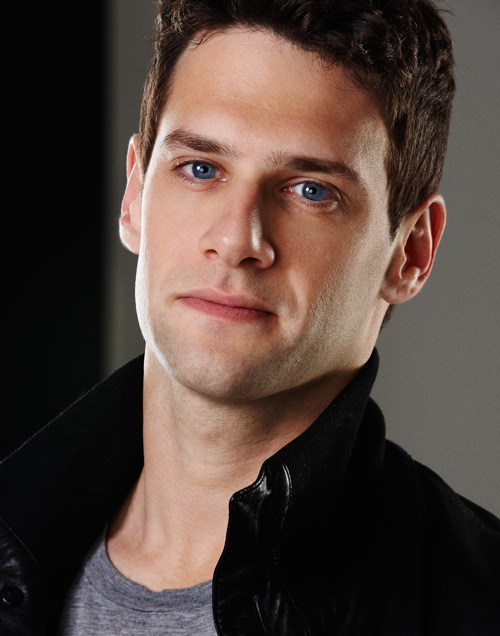
Justin Bartha appears as Marshall Johnson in the episode.

Justin Bartha appears as the protagonist of the episode, Marshall Johnson. Bartha was contacted by Alexa Fogel, the series' casting director, to audition for a secret role in the series. While he didn't get the full script, he accepted the role, deeming himself a fan of the series. He commented, "I had an idea of what was going to happen, but honestly, I probably cried from joy and gratitude that I was given this opportunity to be a part of this."

Tobias Segal portrays E, having previously appeared as the white man in "Three Slaps". Bartha theorized that, "It’s almost like, 'Is this guy a ghost?' the way he became a ghost in that Lake Lanier scene. I believe the first episode is the thesis of the season: This idea that white is where you are and it's when you are. It's kind of that path of acceptance. For Marshall, this is where he is right now with being a white man. And E is further down that path — he's at the end of it. Then he becomes that ghost that's haunted him. But I think so much of that line from the first episode — 'Being white blinds you' — is in this episode. It's about being able to open your eyes and start down that path to acceptance."

=== Writing ===
The episode explored concepts like institutional racism, reparations for slavery, and critical race theory. Vulture compared the episode to Ta-Nehisi Coates's article The Case for Reparations and the series Watchmen, both of which explore similar ideas, "the concept of reparations for slavery and racial violence has become increasingly mainstream, inspiring political, artistic, and intellectual work across the spectrum of beliefs. With yet another stand-alone installment in the series, Atlanta throws its hat in the reparations ring and sets out to wrestle the topic's enormous and amorphous implications with satire."

The Daily Beast further added, "this week's Atlanta succeeds as a delightfully funny piece of speculative fiction (depending on who's watching) and a biting critique of the vain attempts to rectify the destruction of slavery by institutions and individuals, making for one of the best post-BLM episodes of television, so far. One can only assume there’s more to come."

Bartha explained Marshall's view of himself, "I don't think he looks at himself as a victim, but I think part of the thesis of this season is that we're all haunted by this ghost: white, black, every color. And I think that with Marshall, the main foundation is that he's this everyman; this man in the middle. He's never had to face this ghost and probably never really given it that much thought. [...] He keeps it at bay, then he goes through the denial, anger, bargaining, and depression, and then finally, in a way, acceptance of what the reality is. And, like most of us, I don't think he can go on until it literally lands on his front door. Or at our job with a megaphone — until it actually starts to affect us."

== Reception ==
=== Viewers ===
The episode was watched by 0.260 million viewers, earning a 0.1 in the 18-49 rating demographics on the Nielson ratings scale. This means that 0.1 percent of all households with televisions watched the episode. This was a slight decrease from the previous episode, which was watched by 0.284 million viewers with a 0.1 in the 18-49 demographics.

=== Critical reviews ===
"The Big Payback" received generally positive reviews from critics. The review aggregator website Rotten Tomatoes reported a 90% approval rating for the episode, based on 10 reviews with an average rating of 8.3/10.

Michael Martin of The A.V. Club gave the episode an "A−" and wrote, "For a show labeled comedy (for lack of a more apt genre), 'Big Payback' isn't a fun 30-plus minutes, but it is great television. Atlanta is tackling the big, uncomfortable questions no one else would dare — namely, can we resolve systemic racism and reconcile this country's history with slavery, when some won't even acknowledge either — and this episode is worth spending time with. Unfortunately, the people who most need to consider its themes won't see it; they can afford to turn away."

Alan Sepinwall of Rolling Stone wrote, "This one doesn't work nearly as well as 'Three Slaps', though, and suggests there's a limit to even this great show's ability to do and be anything from one episode to the next. Usually, even when Atlanta is going off-format, it still in some way feels like Atlanta. This one, though, seemed more like a leftover installment of another FX show, B. J. Novak's clumsy social satire anthology The Premise." Darren Franich of Entertainment Weekly gave the episode an "A" and wrote, "This is great, vital television. I'd rank 'Big Payback' just behind the season premiere's feverishly funny white-adoption nightmare. Does it matter that the best two episodes of season 3 don't really feature the show's main cast? I've seen some theories that the show is becoming an outright anthology. I hope that is not true, because anthologies suck. But I think Segal's reappearance suggests some hazy-but-potent continuity between these episodes, and maybe a larger thematic story that will only become clear with time."

Jordan Taliha McDonald of Vulture gave the episode a 3 star rating out of 5 and wrote, "Unintentionally, the episode exposes the limits of reparation without revolution. Atlanta sublimates Black precarity to fixate on white fragility and thus, forecloses a more complex exploration of the problems money cannot solve. Perhaps this would explain why its satirical engagement with Black characters is so secondary and sensational." Thrillist wrote, "'The Big Payback' and 'Three Slaps' find Atlanta pushing the boundaries for a series that already felt unconfined. Almost midway through this penultimate season, viewers are unsure what to expect on the other side of that cold open. That's a testament to the risks Glover and crew are willing to take to get these stories heard. Black shows have tackled the reparations conversation before, but never to this degree. It's hard to think of a series on television right now that would dare go this far, and when you couple that with the fact that these conversations are starting to actually pop up in your news feeds, it's hard to tell if any show can match Atlanta's prophetic brilliance."
