= Brahmin Bulls =

- Poster
- Directed by: Mahesh Pailoor
- Written by: Anu Pradhan; Mahesh Pailoor
- Produced by: Yoshinobu Tsuji
- Starring: Sendhil Ramamurthy; Roshan Seth; Mary Steenburgen; Justin Bartha; Michael Lerner
- Cinematography: Ben Kutchins
- Edited by: Cary Lin
- Music by: Gingger Shankar
- Production company: Philote Factory
- Release date: November 14, 2014 (New York City)
- Running time: 96 minutes
- Country: United States
- Language: English

Brahmin Bulls is a 2014 American drama film directed by Mahesh Pailoor and starring Sendhil Ramamurthy, Roshan Seth, Mary Steenburgen, Justin Bartha and Michael Lerner. It is Pailoor's feature directorial debut.

== Plot ==
Brahmin Bulls follows Ashok as he visits his estranged son in Los Angeles. As they attempt to mend their relationship, the true purpose of Ashok's visit is revealed, exploring familial bonds, personal secrets, and the dynamic between father and son.

== Cast ==
- Sendhil Ramamurthy as Sid Sharma
- Roshan Seth as Ashok Sharma
- Mary Steenburgen as Helen West
- Michael Lerner as David
- Cassidy Freeman as Ellie
- Justin Bartha as Alex
- Monica Raymund as Maya

== Release ==
The film was released in New York City on November 14, 2014.

== Reception ==
The film has a 60 percent rating on Rotten Tomatoes based on 10 reviews.

Mike McCahill of The Guardian awarded the film two stars out of five and wrote, "Mahesh Pailoor’s film is appreciably relaxed around matters of age and race, yet – as a missing-cat subplot suggests – it’s somewhat underpowered."

Justin Lowe of The Hollywood Reporter gave the film a mixed review, calling it "an accomplished first feature that doesn’t quite achieve its initial promise."

Sheri Linden of the Los Angeles Times gave the film a negative review and wrote, "...the drama that unfolds from that gambit is too tepid to make the perpetrator’s redemption, let alone the fulfillment of his artistic vision, anything to root for."

Ben Kenigsberg of The New York Times gave the film a positive reviews and wrote, "Gaining in astringency as it goes along, Brahmin Bulls avoids the formulaic version of this story, in which the stubborn son learns from the more experienced father."
