= Petunia (film) =

- Directed by: Ash Christian
- Screenplay by: Ash Christian; Theresa Benett
- Produced by: Ash Christian; Jordan Yale Levine
- Starring: Tobias Segal; Thora Birch; Michael Urie; Brittany Snow; Shad Gaspard
- Cinematography: Austin Schmidt
- Edited by: Scott D. Martin
- Music by: Douglas J. Cuomo
- Production companies: New Films International; Ironclad Pictures
- Distributed by: Wolfe releasing
- Release date: June 28, 2012
- Running time: 107 minutes
- Country: United States
- Language: English

Petunia is a 2012 American comedy-drama film. It was co-written and directed by Ash Christian. Thora Birch, who stars in the film, and her father Jack Birch, are credited as producers.

== Plot ==
The film relates simultaneously the lives and romantic/sexual relationships of the Petunias: the parents, Felicia and Percy, and their three sons, Michael, Adrian and Charlie. The film also features the wife of Michael, Vivian, and her cousin George.

== Cast ==
- Tobias Segal as Charlie Petunia
- Thora Birch as Vivian Petunia
- Christine Lahti as Felicia Petunia
- Brittany Snow as Robin McDougal
- Michael Urie as George McDougal
- David Rasche as Percy Petunia
- Eddie Kaye Thomas as Michael Petunia
- Jimmy Heck as Adrian Petunia
- Branca Ferrazo as Natassia
- Shad Gaspard as XL

== Reception ==
Due to its very limited release, the film has been reviewed by few outlets. Reception for the film has generally been mixed. Frank Scheck from The Hollywood Reporter weighs, in an indifferent review, a "wildly inconsistent" plot against "some marvelous moments and a terrific ensemble". Dennis Harvey in Variety compares the film to director Todd Solondz's works, judging Petunia to have "a bit less bile (and punch)".
