= Xosha Roquemore =

American actress

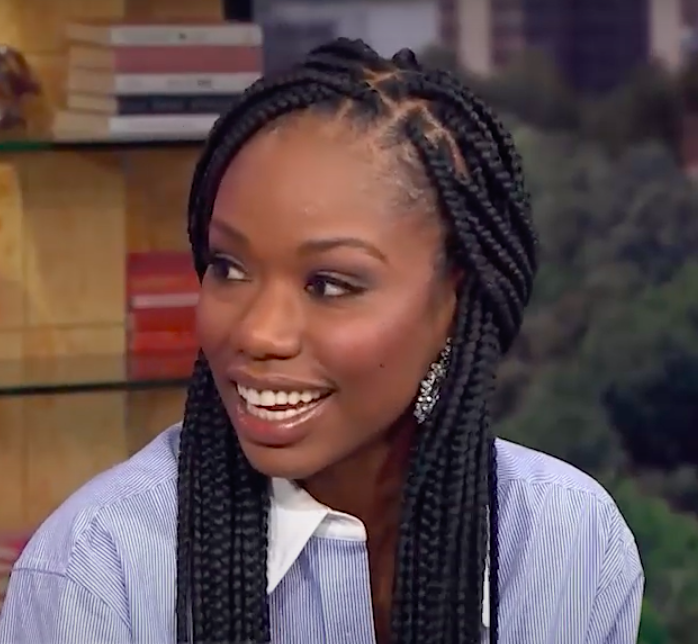
- Roquemore in 2020
- Born: December 11, 1984 (age 41); Los Angeles, California, U.S.
- Education: New York University
- Occupation: Actress
- Years active: 2008–present
- Children: 1

Xosha Roquemore (/ˈzoʊʃə ˈroʊkmɔːr/ ZOH-shə ROHK-mor; born December 11, 1984) is an American actress. She is best known for her roles as Jo Ann in Precious and Tamra in The Mindy Project.

== Early life and education ==
Roquemore was born in 1984 or 1985 in Los Angeles. She has stated that her father learned of the existence of the Xhosa people of South Africa while directing a play about Shaka Zulu and "liked the look of [the name], but switched the h and o to make it easier [to pronounce]."

Roquemore began acting when she joined The Amazing Grace Conservatory, in ninth grade. After graduating from high school, she moved to New York City and graduated from the Tisch program at New York University.

== Career ==
Roquemore starred in her first major film as Jo Ann in Precious. In 2013, she was cast in a recurring role on Kirstie, based on her work in the series pilot. Her role, however, was recast after she was added as a series regular to The Mindy Project after a three-episode guest star stint.

== Personal life ==
Roquemore was in a relationship with actor LaKeith Stanfield in August 2015. In March 2017, the couple announced Roquemore's pregnancy. Roquemore and Stanfield broke up after the birth of their daughter.

Roquemore's father was director Cliff Roquemore.

== Filmography ==
=== Film ===
Year	Title	Role	Notes
2008	Shades of Brooklyn Vol. 1	Allison	Short
2009	Precious	Jo Ann	
2009	Rivers Wash Over Me	Racine Buchanan	
2011	Identical	Mark's Receptionist	
2011	I Can Smoke?	Shirley	Short
2012	Price Check	Donna	
2013	Let Clay Be Clay	TaDenise	
2013	G.B.F.	Caprice Winters	
2013	The Butler	Foxy	
2014	Human Code: Emotions/Society	Herself	Short
2014	Patton Oswalt Confronts His Haters	Herself	Short
2016	9 Rides	Hipster Woman	
2017	All Nighter	Megan	
2017	The Disaster Artist	Actress #3	
2018	Mississippi Requiem	Young Tabitha	
2018	Brian Banks	Kennisha Rice	
2018	A Rose for Emily	Young Tabitha	Short
2021	Space Jam: A New Legacy	Shanice James	
2022	Who Invited Charlie?	Emma	
2023	First Time Female Director	Star	
2023	Family Switch	Carrie	
2025	Captain America: Brave New World	Leila Taylor	

=== Television ===
Year	Title	Role	Notes
2008	Viralcom	Showgirl #1	Episode: "You Got Yourself 30 Seconds"
2010	Nurse Jackie	City Island Clerk	Episode: "Comfort Food"
2010	10 Things I Hate About You	Baby	Episode: "Don't Trust Me"
2010	Law & Order: Criminal Intent	Trina Smith	Episode: "Inhumane Society"
2010	My Boys	Tracee	Episode: "The NTO"
2010	Playing With Guns	Cinnamon	Television film
2011	Rescue Me	Jayne	2 episodes
2012	Southland	Drea	Episode: "Community"
2013	Kirstie	Tanya	Episode: "Pilot"
2013	Dumb Girls	Alex	Television film
2013–2017	The Mindy Project	Nurse Tamra Webb	Recurring cast (season 1), main cast (season 2–6); 81 episodes
2018	Roseanne	Geena Williams-Conner	Episode: "Go Cubs"
2018	I'm Dying Up Here	Dawn Lima	Recurring cast (season 2)
2019	First Wives Club	Marcelle West	Recurring cast (season 1)
2019–2020	Black Monday	Connie	Guest (season 1), recurring cast (season 2)
2019–2022	Sherman's Showcase	Gladys Knight	2 episodes
2020	Cherish the Day	Gently James	Main cast
2020	Big Mouth		Voice, episode: "A Very Special 9/11 Episode"
2021	Colin in Black & White	Erica	Episode: "Cornrows"
2021	Let's Get Merried	Emma	Television film
2022	Atlanta	Xosha	Episode: "Tarrare"
2023	Bob's Burgers	Crazy Nails Teen	Voice, episode: "These Boots Are Made for Stalking"
2024	The Sex Lives of College Girls	Professor Phillips	Episode: "Four to a Suite"
2025–present	Oh My God... Yes! A Series of Extremely Relatable Circumstances	Ladi	Voice, Main cast
2025–present	Forever	Shelly	Netflix series
