= Sinterklaas Is Coming to Town =

- Atlanta episode
- Episode no.: Season 3 Episode 2
- Directed by: Hiro Murai
- Written by: Janine Nabers
- Cinematography by: Stephen Murphy
- Editing by: Isaac Hagy
- Production code: XAA03002
- Original air date: March 24, 2022
- Running time: 33 minutes

Episode chronology
← Previous "Three Slaps"	Next → "The Old Man and the Tree"
- Atlanta season 3

"Sinterklaas Is Coming to Town" is the second episode of the third season of the American comedy-drama television series Atlanta. It is the 23rd overall episode of the series and was written by co-executive producer Janine Nabers, and directed by executive producer Hiro Murai. It was first broadcast on FX in the United States on March 24, 2022, airing back-to-back with the previous episode, "Three Slaps" with next day availability on Hulu.

The series is set in Atlanta and follows Earnest "Earn" Marks, as he tries to redeem himself in the eyes of his ex-girlfriend Van, who is also the mother of his daughter Lottie; as well as his parents and his cousin Alfred, who raps under the stage name "Paper Boi"; and Darius, Alfred's eccentric right-hand man. For the season, the characters find themselves in Europe in the middle of a European tour. In the episode, Earn needs to bail Alfred out of jail following an incident in a hotel room at Amsterdam while Darius picks up Van from the airport. While Earn and Alfred are exposed to the troubling colonial hangovers of Dutch culture, Van and Darius follow an address found in a second-hand jacket to a strange New Age healing centre, where they encounter a dying man believed to be Tupac Shakur.

According to Nielsen Media Research, the episode was seen by an estimated 0.288 million household viewers and gained a 0.1 ratings share among adults aged 18–49. The episode received critical acclaim from critics, who praised the performances, directing, humour, shock value, and character development. Donald Glover submitted the episode to support his nomination for Outstanding Lead Actor in a Comedy Series at the 74th Primetime Emmy Awards.

== Plot ==
Earn (Donald Glover) wakes up in a hotel room next to a woman, after having a bizarre dream. As he goes to the bathroom, his phone receives messages that indicate that he must board a plane to Amsterdam. When he finds the messages, he quickly packs his stuff and leaves, revealing that he is in Copenhagen. Earn calls Darius (Lakeith Stanfield), who reveals that Alfred (Brian Tyree Henry) has been in jail. He instructs Darius to pick up Van (Zazie Beetz), who is coming to Amsterdam.

As Darius picks up Van, Earn barely makes it to Amsterdam, preparing for a concert for which Alfred must perform. He gets the venue owner, Dirk (Matteo Simoni), to give him money to bail Alfred out of jail but finds that he left his laptop in Helsinki. Alfred is dismayed at being released, as he was enjoying attentive treatment by the guards. As they leave, they notice a baby painted in blackface accompanying a man costumed as Sinterklaas, acting as the Zwarte Piet.

While visiting a thrift store, Van and Darius find an address in a jacket and decide to follow the address. They arrive at a living funeral service for a man whom Darius believes may be Tupac Shakur. Van is informed that the man is nearing death, the result of a terminal illness. Van meets the death doula (Elisa van Riessen) reading the funeral and connects with her about the direction her life is going. Van is allowed to talk to the man, holding his hand while quietly comforting him. Suddenly, the doula activates a button that suffocates the man to death, shocking her. Earn and Alfred return to the hotel, with Alfred expressing disgust at some employees wearing blackface. In his hotel room, Alfred remembers that he went to bed with two women who got into an altercation, which culminated with the room being destroyed and him getting arrested.

That night, Alfred decides not to perform after realizing the crowd mostly consists of people in blackface. Earn tells Dirk that Alfred won't perform due to health issues, but that the venue will make more money from the insurance claim anyway. Feeling betrayed, Dirk tells him that he will "destroy" him. He then chases Earn into the lobby and mistakes a man in blackface for him, attacking him while Earn looks on nearby. He goes back to the hotel room, running into Van in the hallway. They have a brief conversation before entering their rooms. An exhausted Earn falls onto the bed, until he notes that his phone is getting messages from Alfred, who wants food.

== Production ==
=== Development ===
"I think everybody knows blackface ain't cool anymore, we get it. They be trying too hard to go viral."

— Official description in the press release for the episode.

In February 2022, FX announced that the second episode of the season would be titled "Sinterklaas Is Coming to Town" and that it would be written by co-executive producer Janine Nabers, and directed by executive producer Hiro Murai. This was Nabers' first writing credit, and Murai's sixteenth directing credit.

=== Writing ===
Alfred's storyline, in which he was comfortable staying at a prison cell for its luxurious treatment, drew parallelisms to ASAP Rocky getting detained in Stockholm, Sweden. The Daily Beast noted that Rocky's detainment drew "the assumption made by some people online that he was actually doing pretty well thanks to photos of Swedish jail cells resembling studio apartments in Manhattan."

== Reception ==
=== Viewers ===
The episode was watched by 0.288 million viewers, earning a 0.1 in the 18-49 rating demographics on the Nielson ratings scale. This means that 0.1 percent of all households with televisions watched the episode. This was a slight decrease from the previous episode, which was watched by 0.310 million viewers with a 0.1 in the 18-49 demographics.

=== Critical reviews ===
"Sinterklaas Is Coming to Town" received critical acclaim. The review aggregator website Rotten Tomatoes reported a 100% approval rating for the episode, based on 20 reviews, with an average rating of 8.8/10. The site's consensus states: "Catching up with the crew as strangers in a strange land, 'Sinterklass Is Coming to Town' is purposeful and taut as it shows these characters adrift."

Michael Martin of The A.V. Club gave the episode an "A" and wrote, "'Sinterklaas Is Coming to Town' includes one of the funniest and most darkly shocking moments in recent memory, and I won't spoil it just in case you're scanning this before watching. Coming at the close of the death-doula scene, it's reminiscent of the best moments of Six Feet Under, only taken one step further. And that's Atlanta: The show — like its characters — is really going places. It's unclear where the twists of this fairytale will lead, but judging by these two episodes, they're not to be missed." Ben Travers of IndieWire gave the episode an "A−" and wrote, "Tuning in for the surprise was even more fun than tearing through the ensuing discussion. Maintaining that level of originality without jumping the shark is difficult, especially after so many years (and so many new shows). But here we are again. Atlanta is back, and with it, our rapt attention."

Alan Sepinwall of Rolling Stone wrote, "Together, 'Three Slaps' and 'Sinterklaas Is Coming to Town' are a reminder of everything Atlanta can be and do, whether it's the stark nightmare of the former or the back-to-basics ensemble shenanigans of the latter." Darren Franich of Entertainment Weekly gave the episode an A− and wrote, "The show's early years look prophetic now in many ways. It tapped a deep vein of racial disparity and capitalist brutality, all while nailing the complete existential ruin of social media right before hating Silicon Valley went mainstream. The first two episodes of season 3 find the show pushing its boundaries even as it rebuilds its core foundation."

Jordan Taliha McDonald of Vulture gave the episode a 4 star rating out of 5 and wrote, "Unlike season two, when Al's difficulty adjusting to fame quite literally left him in the woods, this season, the chasm between Al and his persona, Paper Boi, appears to be closing." Dan Jackson of Thrillist wrote, "This is not a show that's resting on its laurels or coasting on past success. In fact, the series isn’t even relying on its charismatic cast to lure viewers back into the fold." Kelly Lawler of USA Today gave the premiere a 3.5 star rating out of 4 and wrote, "there was never a question of whether there's a place for "Atlanta" all these years later. Good TV shows are consistent, but the great ones know how to change and grow with their characters and with the times. Atlanta has always been one of the greats."

=== Accolades ===
Donald Glover submitted the episode to support his nomination for Outstanding Lead Actor in a Comedy Series at the 74th Primetime Emmy Awards.
