= Justin Bartha =

American actor (born 1978)

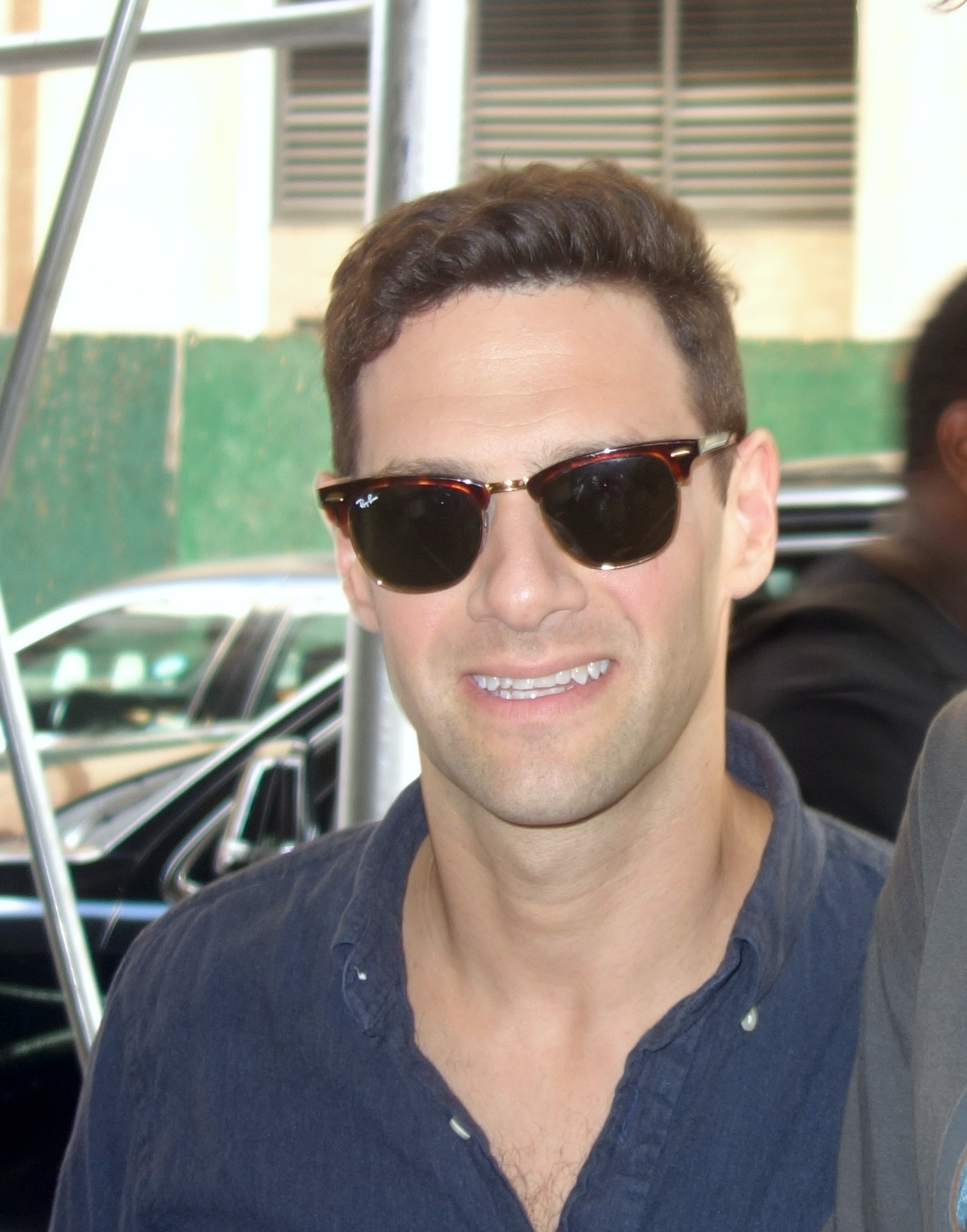
- Bartha in 2016
- Born: July 21, 1978 (age 48); Fort Lauderdale, Florida, U.S.
- Education: New York University (BFA)
- Occupation: Actor
- Years active: 1998–present
- Spouse: Lia Smith (m. 2014)
- Children: 2

Justin Lee Bartha (born July 21, 1978) is an American actor. In film, Bartha has played Riley Poole in the National Treasure film series and Doug Billings in The Hangover trilogy. His television roles include David Sawyer in the NBC comedy series The New Normal as well as Colin Morrello in the CBS All Access (later Paramount+) legal and political drama The Good Fight.

== Early life ==
Bartha was born in Fort Lauderdale, Florida, and moved to West Bloomfield, Michigan when he was eight. Bartha was raised in a Reform Jewish family. After he graduated from West Bloomfield High School in 1996, he moved to New York City and studied filmmaking and theatre at New York University's Tisch School of Arts.

== Career ==
Bartha began his film career behind the camera as a production assistant on the film Analyze This. His acting debut came with his first film, 54, as a clubgoer. He wrote and directed a short film, Highs and Lows, which was shown at the South by Southwest Film Festival in 2003. Additionally, he wrote, produced, and starred in an MTV pilot called The Dustin and Justin Show.

Bartha co-starred opposite Ben Affleck, Jennifer Lopez, Christopher Walken and Al Pacino in the critically bashed Gigli in 2003, before his co-starring role in the National Treasure franchise (2004; 2007) as Riley Poole. He reprised the role in the series continuation for Disney+.

In 2006, Bartha co-starred in the film Failure to Launch and NBC's sitcom Teachers which only aired six episodes.

In November 2007, Bartha was cast in an indie drama, Holy Rollers. His character lures a young Hasidic Jew (Jesse Eisenberg) into becoming an ecstasy dealer. Filming began in New York in the spring of 2008, and the film was released in 2010. Bartha re-teamed with Eisenberg for Eisenberg's critically acclaimed play, Asuncion. Bartha also starred alongside Catherine Zeta-Jones in the Bart Freundlich film, The Rebound which is about a 25-year-old man who starts a romance with his older single mother neighbor, the film began shooting in April 2008 in New York and finished in June. In The Hangover comedy film series, he played Doug Billings, one of the "Wolfpack" members who goes on weekend trips with the trio. After a wild night of partying, he goes missing and his friends frantically search everywhere for him.

Bartha starred as Max in the Broadway revival of the play Lend Me a Tenor by Ken Ludwig. He performed alongside Tony Shalhoub, Anthony LaPaglia, Brooke Adams, and Jan Maxwell. A farcical comedy, it was directed by Stanley Tucci and started previews at the Music Box Theatre on March 11, 2010, with the official opening date on April 4, 2010. It was nominated for a Tony award for best revival of a play. In 2011, Bartha signed on to star in the premiere of Zach Braff's play All New People at Second Stage Theatre. All New People began June 28 and ran through mid-August. Anna Camp, David Wilson Barnes and Krysten Ritter co-starred in this production under the direction of Peter DuBois. In February 2012, Bartha signed on to co-star on the NBC comedy pilot The New Normal. On May 7, 2012, NBC ordered the project to series. The show was centered around a gay couple (played by Bartha and Andrew Rannells) and the surrogate mother (Georgia King) they selected to bear their child. It premiered on September 11, 2012, but was officially canceled the next year on May 10, 2013.

In 2014, Bartha starred in another of Jesse Eisenberg's plays, A Little Part of All Of Us, alongside Eisenberg, for Playing On Air, a non-profit organization that "records short plays [for public radio and podcast] written by top playwrights and performed by outstanding actors."

Bartha has worked with the Matrix Theatre Company, guest directing their Teen Company in Are You Passing?, a play on the state of education in Detroit.

In 2018, Bartha co-starred as Colin Morrello in the first two seasons of the critically acclaimed CBS all-access drama, The Good Fight. In 2021, Bartha signed on to play Robert Morgenthau in the second season of the critically acclaimed EPIX hit drama, Godfather of Harlem and co-starred opposite Jason Momoa in the Netflix movie Sweet Girl. In 2022, Bartha starred in the controversial and critically acclaimed standalone episode in the third season of Atlanta called, The Big Payback. Bartha plays a man named Marshall Johnson who finds out he must pay slavery reparations.

== Personal life ==
Bartha married Pilates instructor and creator of B The Method Lia Smith in Oahu, Hawaii, on January 4, 2014. On April 13, 2014, she gave birth to their first daughter. On April 16, 2016, she gave birth to their second daughter.

== Acting credits ==
=== Film ===
Film
Year	Title	Role	Notes
1998	54	Clubgoer	Uncredited
1999	Tag	Kip Woffard	Short film
2003	Gigli	Brian	
2003	Carnival Sun	Brian	Short film
2004	National Treasure	Riley Poole	
2005	Trust the Man	Jasper Bernard	
2006	Failure to Launch	Philip "Ace"	
2007	National Treasure: Book of Secrets	Riley Poole	
2008	New York, I Love You	Justin	Segment: "Randy Balsmeyer"
2009	The Hangover	Doug Billings	
2009	Jusqu'à toi	Jack	Aka Shoe at Your Foot; also executive producer
2009	The Rebound	Aram Finkelstein	
2010	Holy Rollers	Yosef Zimmerman	
2011	The Hangover Part II	Doug Billings	
2011	Dark Horse	Richard	
2013	The Hangover Part III	Doug Billings	
2013	CBGB	Stiv Bators	
2014	Brahmin Bulls	Alex	
2016	White Girl	Kelly	
2016	Sticky Notes	Bryan	Also known as The Backup Dancer
2018	Driven	Howard Weitzman	
2018	Sorry for Your Loss	Ken	
2019	Against the Clock	Peter Hobbs	Also known as Headlock and Transference
2021	Sweet Girl	Simon Keeley	
2022	Dear Zoe	David Gladstone	
2024	Nuked	Jack Langer	
2026	Influenced		

=== Television ===
Television
Year	Title	Role	Notes
2004	Strip Search	—N/a	Television film
2006	Teachers	Jeff Cahill	Main cast; 6 episodes
2009	WWII in HD	Jack Werner (voice)	Miniseries; 5 episodes
2012–2013	The New Normal	David Sawyer	Main cast; 22 episodes
2016	Cooper Barrett's Guide to Surviving Life	Josh Barrett	Main cast; 13 episodes
2017–2018	The Good Fight	Colin Morrello	Main cast; 17 episodes
2019	Drunk History	Thomas H. Ince	Episode: "Drunk Mystery II"
2020; 2022	The Accidental Wolf	—N/a	
2021; 2023	Godfather of Harlem	Robert Morgenthau	Recurring; 7 episodes
2021	The Other Two	Himself	Episode: "Brooke & Cary Go to a Fashion Show"
2022	Atlanta	Marshall Johnson	Episode: "The Big Payback"
2022	National Treasure: Edge of History	Riley Poole	Episode: "Charlotte"
TBA	Wild Things †	Ken Feld	Upcoming miniseries

=== Music videos ===
Year	Title	Artist	Role	Ref.
2014	"Imagine" (UNICEF: World version)	Various	Himself	

=== Theatre ===
Theatre
Year	Title	Role	Notes
2010	64th Tony Awards	Performing Artist	
2010	Lend Me a Tenor	Max	Broadway revival Music Box Theatre
2011	All New People	Charlie	Second Stage Theatre
2011	Asuncion	Vinny	Off-Broadway; Rattlestick Playwrights Theater
2013	The Sunshine Boys	Ben	Ahmanson Theatre; Center Theatre Group
2015	Permission	Eric	MCC Theater

=== Awards and nominations ===
Year	Award	Category	Nominated work	Result
2003	Stinkers Bad Movie Awards	Worst Supporting Actor	Gigli	Nominated
2003	Stinkers Bad Movie Awards	Worst Song (for "Baby Got Back")	Gigli	Nominated
2009	Awards Circuit Community Awards	Best Cast Ensemble	The Hangover	Nominated
