= Living funeral =

Funeral held for a living person

A living funeral, also called a pre-funeral, is a funeral held for a living person. It may be important to the person's psychological state and also that of the dying person's family to attend the living funeral. It is also sometimes used as a time to read the will and explain the reasons behind some of the decisions contained within it.

== Purpose ==
A living funeral is usually done by someone who knows that they do not have much time left to live. Whether the reason is that the person is terminally ill or is at an old age, the person knows death is near and could use it as closure. It is used to celebrate the happy times, and forgive the body for "failing".

== Cost ==
Another reason of having a living funeral is that regular funeral prices can be extremely high. Having a living funeral can save some money, and some feel that a living funeral is more meaningful. In the end, it can be around the same price for the living funeral ceremony and when the person does eventually die, the burial or cremation.

== Aspects ==
Most living funerals have the same aspects of a normal funeral, the deceased person aside. A common theme is for the funeral to start off the same way that a normal funeral would; somber music, a casket, bible readings, etc. From there the tone is usually switched. Different music is played along with a happier atmosphere. This ceremony is often a very happy event where there can be closure, with the goal to celebrate a life and to give thanks to everyone attending. During a living funeral, families and friends will share stories and memories of the person who is nearing death, and the soon-to-be-deceased person often speaks about their life and who has affected it, while others want to be able to show their appreciation. Friends and family of the person hosting the funeral will say things that they would have said at a normal funeral, except now their loved one is there to hear it.

== Japan ==
Living funerals, called seizensō (生前葬) in Japanese, started being done in Japan in the 1990s. Elders in Japan feel that they are burdening their children with their old age, and are ashamed of their failing body. By having a living funeral they feel that they can take some of the stress away from the funeral. After this ceremony, many Japanese "expect nothing" from their families after they die, including a funeral.

== Controversy ==
Living funerals are very controversial; critics believe funerals should be performed after death, which may stem from a feeling that it is the only way to truly respect the dead. In Japan, a living funeral is also considered "a denial of ancestral significance."

Living funerals can also be seen as egocentric because the person having the funeral may use it as an opportunity to brag, since listing accomplishments during one's life is often a popular thing to do during this ceremony. However, Mizunoe Takiko, who had a living funeral on television, said that the purpose of her funeral was "to express appreciation to all those who have been dear to me while I am still alive."

== Fiction ==
- Atlanta
- Coming 2 America
- Empire Records
- Futurama (Season 3, Episode 17: "A Pharaoh to Remember")
- Get Low
- Hiccups
- Little House on the Prairie
- The Living Wake
- Mrs. Brown's Boys
- Red vs. Blue
- The Weather Man
- The Fault in Our Stars
- Boston Legal (Season 2, Episode 14)
- Tom Sawyer
- Grace and Frankie (Season 2, Episode 12: "The Party")
- The Good Place (In Season 4, Episode 8, "The Funeral to End All Funerals," the four human characters, who have all died, had their deaths reversed, died again, while also living through 803 rebooted versions of the afterlife, hold a living funeral for themselves in their 804th version of the afterlife, even though one of the characters is unconscious and none of them are technically alive)
- New Amsterdam (Season 2, Episode 13)
- Sinterklaas is Coming to Town
- Curb Your Enthusiasm (Season 11, Episode 1)
- 9-1-1 (Season 6, Episode 15)
- The Golden Girls (Season 7, Episode 18)
- Love at First Sight
- SpongeBob SquarePants (Season 14, Episode 297: "Don't Make Me Laugh")
- Ruby Gloom (Season 1, Episode 2: "Gloomer Rumor")

== Non-fiction ==
One of the more famous living funerals was for Morrie Schwartz, as documented in both the book and film Tuesdays with Morrie, which features Detroit Free Press sports columnist Mitch Albom as one of the central characters. Because of this, living funerals became much more popular. Albom brought up the question of why one should wait until he is dead to be appreciated: "What a waste," he said, "All those people saying all those wonderful things, and Irv never got to hear any of it."
