= White Fashion =

- Atlanta episode
- Episode no.: Season 3 Episode 6
- Directed by: Ibra Ake
- Written by: Ibra Ake
- Cinematography by: Stephen Murphy
- Editing by: Issac Hagy
- Production code: XAA03006
- Original air date: April 21, 2022
- Running time: 32 minutes

Episode chronology
| ← Previous "Cancer Attack" | Next → "Trini 2 De Bone" |
- Atlanta season 3

"White Fashion" is the sixth episode of the third season of the American comedy-drama television series Atlanta. It is the 27th overall episode of the series and was written and directed by supervising producer Ibra Ake. It was first broadcast on FX in the United States on April 21, 2022.

The series is set in Atlanta and follows Earnest "Earn" Marks, as he tries to redeem himself in the eyes of his ex-girlfriend Van, who is also the mother of his daughter Lottie; as well as his parents and his cousin Alfred, who raps under the stage name "Paper Boi"; and Darius, Alfred's eccentric right-hand man. For the season, the characters find themselves in Europe in the middle of a concert tour. In the episode, Alfred is approached by a fashion house to help in a race-related PR nightmare but finds himself disappointed by the real intentions of the company. Meanwhile, Darius takes the company's head of hospitality to a restaurant while Earn reconnects with Van.

According to Nielsen Media Research, the episode was seen by an estimated 0.203 million household viewers and gained a 0.1 ratings share among adults aged 18–49. The episode received critical acclaim, with critics praising the writing, directing, performances and subject matter.

== Plot ==
In London, an Italian fashion house named Esco Esco is embroiled in controversy after selling clothes that incorporate streetwear, being deemed a race-related issue after selling a sweatshirt that reads "Central Park 5". In order to get a more positive outlook for the company, the fashion house contacts Alfred (Brian Tyree Henry) and Earn (Donald Glover) to visit them.

The company wants to use Alfred to "properly apologize" to the community by making him part of their diversity advisory committee, but Alfred won't receive money; instead, his participation will result in a charity donation to any foundation of his choice. Alfred accepts but pressures the designers to grant him free clothing for three years. Earn feels uneasy about the offer, deeming it an "Uncle Tom photo op" but Alfred is happy to receive free expensive clothing. Meanwhile, Darius (Lakeith Stanfield) is approached by Sharon (Tamsin Topolski), the head of hospitality, who is curious about his request to order jollof rice, a meal that no one at the fashion house seems to know. She offers to get the meal and he agrees to take her to the restaurant.

At a press event before announcing the committee, Alfred meets one of the members, a writer/activist named Khalil (Fisayo Akinade). Alfred finds himself uncomfortable when Khalil mentions that they are "apologizing for white people" and will deflect any racism issue. At the press event, Alfred is questioned if racism will be over. When Alfred states that it won't, Khalil steps in to explain that racism "will be done by 2024", earning applause. Meanwhile, Darius and Sharon have arrived at the restaurant, Eko Chops, which specializes in Nigerian food. Sharon is fascinated by the meals, although she is frustrated by the poor Internet service. Later, Darius sees that Sharon quit her job and bought the restaurant so she could now operate a food truck parked outside, disillusioning him.

At a committee meeting, Alfred struggles with suggesting ideas but is perplexed when the rest of the members just promote their own brands and engage in self-promotion for their products. Alfred then questions the members' own race as to how they are so ignorant of helping their community. Meanwhile, Earn runs into Van (Zazie Beetz) in a hotel lobby, which is their first encounter in some time. Earn confronts her about her absence, when a white woman approaches Van, accusing her of stealing a wig from a nearby store. Earn defends Van just as security guards escort the woman out of the hotel. Earn then lashes out at the hotel's poor service and they are granted a free night at a room, despite Earn not originally planning to stay there.

Back at the meeting, Alfred suggests a "Reinvest in your Hood" campaign, which consists of black people supporting black businesses. Some members actually like the idea, and through some feedback, they finally agree to the idea. However, the result proves to be a heavy-handed commercial that practically ignores the message, infuriating Alfred, who compares it to All Lives Matter. Khalil takes Alfred outside and explains that companies wouldn't "fund their own demise" by having a community reinvest as it would be more "charity" than "business". He tells Alfred to get his own non-profit organization, just like he did by getting $100,000 from the company. Alfred then leaves in disappointment. At their hotel room, Earn and Van bond. He asks her if she stole the wig, to which she doesn't reply, and they share a kiss. The next morning, Earn wakes up to discover that Van has left.

== Production ==
=== Development ===
"I've definitely seen this before on a better show. They're always stealing ideas. But the fashion industry gotta be exposed #streetwear."

— Official description in the press release for the episode.

In March 2022, FX announced that the sixth episode of the season would be titled "White Fashion" and that it would be written and directed by supervising producer Ibra Ake. This was Ake's second writing credit, and first directing credit.

=== Writing ===
The episode explored concepts like racism in the fashion industry, All Lives Matter, and gentrification. GQ noted how the episode felt inspired by many companies such as Prada, Burberry, and Gucci, all of which found themselves under controversy for releasing "products deemed racially insensitive." It also stated, "The show's message of an unpayable debt rings particularly true in the fashion industry. Historically, fashion brands have taken trends from black communities (often without credit), while often giving very little back. And while there are still plenty of real-world analogues for Bouchet, black designers in positions of power are trying to change things."

Cracked.com noted parallels with main cast actor Donald Glover, who struck a deal with Adidas in 2018. The company was criticized for a racial incident as well as its noted "racist practices". It further added, "'White Fashion' has much more to say about a culture of appropriation and exploitation, and it's also entirely possible that, since this kind of corporate bias and ensuing inept response is alarmingly common, the Adidas thing played no part in the inspiration for this episode."

== Reception ==
=== Viewers ===
The episode was watched by 0.203 million viewers, earning a 0.1 in the 18-49 rating demographics on the Nielson ratings scale. This means that 0.1 percent of all households with televisions watched the episode. This was a 30% decrease from the previous episode, which was watched by 0.290 million viewers with a 0.1 in the 18-49 demographics.

=== Critical reviews ===
"White Fashion" received critical acclaim. The review aggregator website Rotten Tomatoes reported a 100% approval rating for the episode, based on 5 reviews with an average rating of 8.5/10.

Michael Martin of The A.V. Club gave the episode an "A−" and wrote, "'White Fashion' asks, Who deserves to cut corners to recoup in a fundamentally corrupt and shameful system? The season will play differently once it's bingeable and you don't have so much time to wonder about how much is occurring in actuality. In the meantime, this episode of Atlanta forces you to ask: Where are we, really, right now? And that seems to be precisely the point."

Alan Sepinwall of Rolling Stone wrote, "Atlanta is back in social satire mode with the exceedingly sharp 'White Fashion', the kind of tale where if you didn't laugh, you'd scream — and wind up doing both anyway." Aric Jenkins of The Ringer wrote, "The moral of the story, it seems, is that Earn was right. Al initially had leverage to demand a diversity program on his own terms. Instead, he accepted material goods to do it Esco Esco's way, and this is the ultimate result. Then again, Esco Esco did say the charity could be of Al's choosing. Just like Sharon said she wanted to work with Mimi, not buy out her business. Maybe the real lesson, Atlanta is saying, is to be careful with which white people you trust."

Jordan Taliha McDonald of Vulture gave the episode a 4 star rating out of 5 and wrote, "While Paper Boi's tour has provided a roadmap for this season, black grievance and white guilt have made way for detours." Deshawn Thomas /Film wrote, "Unfortunately, this week on Atlanta we are not provided with any sort of resolution or follow-up concerning the events of the previous episode, 'Cancer Attack.' There's no more Socks, and no more mention of Al's missing phone. It's a weird narrative choice, and I'm normally all for weird, but I imagine this will leave more than a few fans of the series feeling justifiably frustrated. Instead, episode 6 of Atlanta season 3, entitled 'White Fashion', leaps a few weeks into the future and focuses on the topics of performative activism and selling out. In true Atlanta fashion, the episode is filled with referential humor and heavily influenced by real-world events."

Kyndall Cunningham of The Daily Beast was positive of the ideas behind the episode but questioned its execution, "It's debatable, throughout the course of the episode, whether Ake thinks the audience should loathe or respect Khalil's hustle — especially by the end — given that he's taken rightful advantage of white people's useless guilt but also perpetuating this idea that racism can be eradicated with conservative, ultimately hollow gestures of solidarity."
