= The Old Man and the Tree =

- Atlanta episode
- Episode no.: Season 3 Episode 3
- Directed by: Hiro Murai
- Written by: Taofik Kolade
- Cinematography by: Stephen Murphy
- Editing by: Isaac Hagy
- Production code: XAA03004
- Original air date: March 31, 2022
- Running time: 35 minutes

Episode chronology
← Previous "Sinterklaas is Coming to Town"	Next → "The Big Payback"
- Atlanta season 3

"The Old Man and the Tree" is the third episode of the third season of the American comedy-drama television series Atlanta. It is the 24th overall episode of the series and was written by supervising producer Taofik Kolade, and directed by executive producer Hiro Murai. It was first broadcast on FX in the United States on March 31, 2022.

The series is set in Atlanta and follows Earnest "Earn" Marks, as he tries to redeem himself in the eyes of his ex-girlfriend Van, who is also the mother of his daughter Lottie; as well as his parents and his cousin Alfred, who raps under the stage name "Paper Boi"; and Darius, Alfred's eccentric right-hand man. For the season, the characters find themselves in Europe in the middle of a concert tour. In the episode, Earn, Alfred, Darius and Van attend a party in London hosted by a possible investor for Alfred. As each one is on their own, they experience different absurd situations.

According to Nielsen Media Research, the episode was seen by an estimated 0.284 million household viewers and gained a 0.1 ratings share among adults aged 18–49. The episode received critical acclaim, with critics praising the episode's humor, performances, cinematography, and social commentary.

== Plot ==
In London, Earn (Donald Glover), Alfred (Brian Tyree Henry), Darius (Lakeith Stanfield) and Van (Zazie Beetz) attend a party hosted by a billionaire and possible investor, Fernando. When they arrive at the location, they are confused to see that the party is being held at a shabby flat. They are then led through the flat to the real party, which is a luxurious space inside and used the flat as a "decoy house".

As Earn and Van go meet an artist, Alfred and Darius visit a Nando's restaurant inside the property and meet Fernando (Daniel Fathers). Fernando shows Alfred a tree, one of the oldest in the city, from which he built the house around it. Fernando states he used the place to get people to get comfortable, before taking Alfred upstairs for a poker game. Somewhere, Darius approaches a British East Asian woman named MK (Jasmine Leung), who thinks that Darius was trying to flirt with her. They then exchange a conversation where they question their different perspectives and cultures. After she leaves, Darius is approached by a white Englishman named Socks (Hugh Coles), who apologizes for the woman's racial behavior and states he will protect him.

Earn and Van meet the artist, TJ (Sheyi Cole), who is interested in them due to their relationship to Alfred. He then shows them his artwork, leaving them both uneasy at the lack of imagination and "sad" state of the work. Earn talks with the investor, Will (Patrick Kennedy), and questions if the amount of money they spent on him will be worth it. TJ then explains that he intends to turn the place into an "Influencer incubator" with the art as a subscription to pay for everything, worrying Earn that he is taking advantage of Will. At the poker room, Alfred joins Fernando and some of his friends. Fernando then claims that one night, a naked black man entered into his house and he was certain that it was a ghost before proceeding to have sex with him. As Alfred wins some money, everyone leaves the table.

Darius is approached by Socks and more white people, with Socks referring to the incident as "some real 12 Years a Slave shit", making him even more uncomfortable. Socks then exaggerates the story, claiming the woman said "All Lives Matter". MK then arrives, wanting Darius to meet her fiancé, Will, and is cornered and insulted by the partygoers. Earn finds Alfred, who had his hat stolen by a girl running through the house. Alfred complains about Fernando while Earn also shares his frustration regarding TJ's art. TJ approaches them to tell them that Fernando left, angering Alfred as he didn't pay him. Earn then sees Van talking with a man and approaches her, questioning if she is mad at him for anything, which she denies. As she leaves, she pushes a woman into a pool.

Earn changes his mind about TJ's plot to get some of Will's money following a conversation with the aspiring artist and after noticing a slave in the background of a photo of Will's ancestors. Earn then convinces Will to let him manage TJ. He is then approached by Darius, who wants to leave for all the events that happened. Alfred confronts Fernando outside his bedroom, demanding the money. When Fernando refuses to face him, Alfred takes a chainsaw and starts cutting the tree while Fernando stares. As Earn calls for a drive home, Darius is approached by Will, who apologizes for MK's "behavior" and states he is calling off the wedding. Alfred then takes some of the items of the house and the three leave the property. Darius sees MK crying outside but Alfred forces him to enter their car. They then laugh, until Socks is revealed to be in the front seat and gives Alfred his hat back.

In a mid-credit scene, Van is seen at a kebab shop. An item she stole from the billionaire's house sits in front of her on the table. She is called by Earn but she ignores his call.

== Production ==
=== Development ===
"This one was cool. Going to rich parties and meeting weirdos. Season 1 was better."

— Official description in the press release for the episode.

In February 2022, FX announced that the third episode of the season would be titled "The Old Man and the Tree" and that it would be written by supervising producer Taofik Kolade, and directed by executive producer Hiro Murai. This was Kolade's second writing credit, and Murai's seventeenth directing credit.

=== Writing ===
The episode explored concepts like white guilt and white savior, with Vulture writing, "With Socks, Atlanta parodies the white progressive whose gestures feign concerns for others but, in fact, reveal an untenable self-centering. The telltale signs of such a mode include an inability to listen or respect Black voices when their perspectives do not serve the "ally" agenda or request more than performances of support. [...] As it turns out, the performance of supporting him was nothing more than a license for white moral authority." The Daily Beast further added, "it's the beginning of a running gag about white people being performatively 'woke' and overprotective allies without the consideration of the Black people they're trying to protect."

== Reception ==
=== Viewers ===
The episode was watched by 0.284 million viewers, earning a 0.1 in the 18-49 rating demographics on the Nielson ratings scale. This means that 0.1 percent of all households with televisions watched the episode. This was a slight decrease from the previous episode, which was watched by 0.288 million viewers with a 0.1 in the 18-49 demographics.

=== Critical reviews ===
"The Old Man and the Tree" received critical acclaim. The review aggregator website Rotten Tomatoes reported a 100% approval rating for the episode, based on 7 reviews with an average rating of 8.5/10.

Michael Martin of The A.V. Club gave the episode an "A−" and wrote, "Atlanta's previous encounters with an affluent party crowd and an eccentric mogul resulted in series-best episodes; 'The Old Man and the Tree' isn't quite on that level, but it's consistently amusing and sharp. As crazy as the proceedings get, Atlanta grounds them in small, real moments while taking broad swipes at racial and cultural conventions. It's not often that a farcical evening gives you so much to think about. The tone is perfect: Just heightened enough not to be too over the top. These are absurd times. As Al says, balance is a motherfucker."

Alan Sepinwall of Rolling Stone wrote, "When you are Black and traveling through a majority white country, race is always going to be an issue, even in the fairly absurd contexts present throughout most of 'The Old Man and the Tree.'"

Jordan Taliha McDonald of Vulture gave the episode a 4 star rating out of 5 and wrote, "Unlike last season, which turned its lens toward the inner-city's scramble for commercial goods, this season moves from Atlanta to Europe to uncover the unquantifiable losses wrought by history with humor and horror." Deshawn Thomas of /Film wrote, "We're now three episodes deep into season 3 of Donald Glover's Atlanta, and it's abundantly clear that the series is leaning fully into afro-surrealism with the delightful absurdity of 'The Old Man and the Tree.' The episode also makes it obvious that the themes presented in the season premiere are going to be the overarching themes of the entire season."
