= Trini 2 De Bone =

- Atlanta episode
- Episode no.: Season 3 Episode 7
- Directed by: Donald Glover
- Written by: Jordan Temple
- Cinematography by: Christian Sprenger
- Editing by: Isaac Hagy; Kyle Reiter
- Production code: XAA03005
- Original air date: April 28, 2022
- Running time: 33 minutes

Guest appearances
- Justin Hagan as Miles Warner; Chet Hanks as Curtis; Christina Bennett Lind as Bronwyn Warner

Episode chronology
← Previous "White Fashion"	Next → "New Jazz"
- Atlanta season 3

"Trini 2 De Bone" is the seventh episode of the third season of the American comedy-drama television series Atlanta. It is the 28th overall episode of the series and was written by co-producer Jordan Temple and directed by series creator and main actor Donald Glover. It was first broadcast on FX in the United States on April 28, 2022.

The series is set in Atlanta and follows Earnest "Earn" Marks, as he tries to redeem himself in the eyes of his ex-girlfriend Van, who is also the mother of his daughter Lottie; as well as his parents and his cousin Alfred, who raps under the stage name "Paper Boi;" and Darius, Alfred's eccentric right-hand man. For the season, the characters find themselves in Europe in the middle of a concert tour. In the episode, a married couple finds that their regular nanny has died and struggle with the idea of raising their son, especially as it appears they barely know him at all. Similar to some previous episodes, none of the main cast members appear in the episode.

According to Nielsen Media Research, the episode was seen by an estimated 0.152 million household viewers and gained a 0.04 ratings share among adults aged 18–49. The episode received generally positive reviews, with critics praising the episode's dark humor, message and Glover's directing. However, some expressed dissatisfaction with the main characters' absence and questioned the series' decision to "sideline" them throughout the season, with most critics agreeing it to be the weakest episode of the season. Some critics were also critical of Chet Hanks’ appearance, with some deeming it as inappropriate.

== Plot ==
In New York City, a white man named Miles Warner (Justin Hagan) jogs through the city until he returns to his penthouse apartment at 56 Leonard Street. His wife, Bronwyn (Christina Bennett Lind), is frustrated as their Trinidadian nanny, Sylvia, hasn't arrived to stay with their son, Sebastian (Indy Sullivan Groudis). Miles then receives a call and is informed that Sylvia has died.

An envelope then arrives at their house, with Sylvia's name written on it. Miles asks the doorman about the envelope, but he claims he didn't see anyone leaving it. As Sebastian had fond memories of Sylvia, Miles and Bronwyn discuss the proper way to inform him about her death. The conversation turns awkward so Miles outright tells Sebastian that Sylvia died. Sebastian shows no sadness, but asks to attend her funeral. Though Bronwyn feels uncertain, they decide to go to the funeral with him.

As they drive, they meet Sylvia's daughter, Khadija. At the funeral, Miles and Bronwyn express concern when Sebastian appears to have a more general knowledge of the ceremony and of Trinidadian and Tobagonian English than themselves. The funeral is warm, and Sylvia’s family are kind to the white family, but several strange events occur nonetheless. This includes Miles being sent a photograph of a monkey’s anus over AirDrop. This is in reference to the Trinidadian phrase, "the higher a monkey climb, the more he show his ass;" used here to describe Miles and his behavior. Per Sylvia's wishes, dancers enter the ceremony to dance her favorite song, "Trini 2 De Bone." Sylvia's other daughter, Princess, then takes the stage to complain about her mother abandoning her children to take care of other people. The speech prompts a fight between her family members while a man whom Sylvia babysat (Chet Hanks) films the actions. Miles, Bronwyn and Sebastian start to leave, and the family notes it, explaining that the conflict is an expression of their sadness. On the way back home, Miles hums the song.

That night, Miles bids good night to Sebastian. Sebastian then says good night to Sylvia, referring to an empty chair next to him. In their bedroom, Miles and Bronwyn discuss the events at the funeral, with Bronwyn expressing concern about the way they are raising their child and how he would treat them in the future. The couple are abruptly awoken by a rapid, aggressive knock on the door, and when Miles opens it, he once again finds the envelope at their door. Miles opens it to reveal portraits of Sylvia and Sebastian at the family picture day at his school, an event that Miles and Bronwyn didn't attend. Miles then laments his situation, realizing their lack of presence in Sebastian's life, while a woman's voice sings "Trini 2 De Bone" in the form of a lullaby, like she used to sing it to Sebastian.

== Production ==
=== Development ===
"White people watching this be like... Pain."

— Official description in the press release for the episode.

In March 2022, FX announced that the seventh episode of the season would be titled "Trini 2 De Bone" and that it would be written by co-producer Jordan Temple, and directed by series creator and lead actor Donald Glover. This was Temple's first writing credit, and Glover's fifth directing credit.

=== Casting ===
The episode featured an appearance by Chet Hanks as Curtis, a person who speaks in a Trinidadian accent despite being born and raised in Tribeca. Cracked.com said, "Chet Hanks sucks for lots of reasons but this was an admittedly funny scene. And his presence may tie into another of the episode's themes: parental neglect. In this story, the rich white couple buck many of their parental responsibilities, and are content to let a woman they know virtually nothing about raise him. And Sylvia’s children vocally resent the fact that random white kids were afforded the attention and care from their mother that they never got to have."

=== Writing ===
The episode explored the concept of parental neglect. Vulture saw similarities in the episode to the non-fiction book, Raising Brooklyn: Nannies, Childcare, and Caribbeans Creating Community, by author Tamara Mose Brown. In the book, "the lives of Afro-Caribbean women in a singular borough in New York City are explored through the often informal and exploitative childcare economy fostered by the city's white upper crust. Keying in on the nanny networks, mutual aid, and cultural connections that provide these West Indian women with crucial support and solidarity, Mose situates the women behind the strollers as strategists who expertly negotiate care work and community in the ways that stave off the cultural alienation and isolation embedded in their work. This week, Atlanta turns toward a white family who employs an Afro-Trinidadian woman as they grapple with, in Mose's words, 'losing ground' to her ingenuity and influence in the rearing of their child."

== Reception ==
=== Viewers ===
The episode was watched by 0.152 million viewers, earning a 0.04 in the 18-49 rating demographics on the Nielson ratings scale. This means that 0.04 percent of all households with televisions watched the episode. This was a 26% decrease from the previous episode, which was watched by 0.203 million viewers with a 0.1 in the 18-49 demographics.

=== Critical reviews ===
"Trini 2 De Bone" received generally positive reviews from critics. The review aggregator website Rotten Tomatoes reported a 100% approval rating for the episode, based on 5 reviews with an average rating of 7/10.

Alan Sepinwall of Rolling Stone wrote, "It's hard not to miss Al, Earn, Darius, and Van — especially when the European episodes have been so on-point and varied — but this was a really good one, feeling thematically linked to the season's other anthology episodes without being a stylistic rehash of them." Jordan Taliha McDonald of Vulture gave the episode a 4 star rating out of 5 and wrote, "Throughout this season of Atlanta, the show has grappled with the ghosts of the past at every turn. In this episode, we witness how these hauntings and histories produce ghosts and gaps in our present as well."

Other reviews were more mixed. Michael Martin of The A.V. Club was more critical, giving the episode a "B−" and writing, "Part of the problem is that Atlanta has raised the bar for itself so high that it's easier to stumble, or seem just okay. And part of my issue is that I want to see Paper Boi's adventures in Paris or Berlin. There's a whole continent of possibilities for these characters, and it feels like we're getting just slivers of narrative. The reason for the split focus may be actor availability, or COVID, or who knows. For the viewer, there's a fine line between willing to go wherever the show takes us and feeling like this isn't what we signed up for. We'll take what we can get, but is this what the show's richly drawn and portrayed characters deserve?" Micah Peters of The Ringer wrote, "After the third stand-alone episode this season, this much is clear: No one knows what kind of show Atlanta wants to be anymore."

Deshawn Thomas /Film wrote, "With these standalone episodes, it feels as though Atlanta is aiming to rival or compete with someone like Jordan Peele — and falling short of doing so in any meaningful way. Sure, the end result is amusing, but is it really thought-provoking? Maybe to people who don't normally think about or live with the reality of these things, but I can't imagine that type of person would be tuning in for Atlanta to begin with. It doesn't even feel quite like commentary so much as disappointingly hollow satire, or maybe a funhouse mirror of sorts. I can't tell if the show thinks it's smarter than it actually is, or if I had too much faith in it and have unintentionally orchestrated my own disappointment. Whatever the case may be, there are now three episodes left in this uneven season of hits and misses. As I mentioned in my review of 'White Fashion', I'm hoping things all come together in a grand, satisfying way by the end of it all." Kyndall Cunningham of The Daily Beast, "I think more than any other episode this season, this one highlights the identity crisis Atlanta is currently experiencing regarding who its audience is and who the writers are crafting stories for. Listen, I get it. A lot has happened in the four years since the show last aired that would alter the direction and energy of any show. I also wouldn't be surprised if Robbin’ Season walking away with zero Emmys in 2018 made Glover overthink some things."
