= Cancer Attack =

- Atlanta episode
- Episode no.: Season 3 Episode 5
- Directed by: Hiro Murai
- Written by: Jamal Olori
- Cinematography by: Stephen Murphy
- Editing by: Kyle Reiter
- Production code: XAA03007
- Original air date: April 14, 2022
- Running time: 31 minutes

Episode chronology
← Previous "The Big Payback"	Next → "White Fashion"
- Atlanta season 3

"Cancer Attack" is the fifth episode of the third season of the American comedy-drama television series Atlanta. It is the 26th overall episode of the series and was written by supervising producer Jamal Olori, and directed by executive producer Hiro Murai. It was first broadcast on FX in the United States on April 14, 2022.

The series is set in Atlanta and follows Earnest "Earn" Marks, as he tries to redeem himself in the eyes of his ex-girlfriend Van, who is also the mother of his daughter Lottie; as well as his parents and his cousin Alfred, who raps under the stage name "Paper Boi"; and Darius, Alfred's eccentric right-hand man. For the season, the characters find themselves in Europe in the middle of a concert tour. In the episode, Alfred loses his phone while performing at a Budapest venue, forcing Earn to try to find the thief.

According to Nielsen Media Research, the episode was seen by an estimated 0.290 million household viewers and gained a 0.1 ratings share among adults aged 18–49. The episode received positive reviews from critics, who praised the episode's comedic tone and performances (particularly Samuel Blenkin). However, some were divided on the ending and on the addition of Socks.

== Plot ==
In Budapest, Earn (Donald Glover), Alfred (Brian Tyree Henry) and Darius (Lakeith Stanfield) stay at a venue for a concert. As Alfred meets and greets his fans, Earn tries to contact Van, whom he hasn't heard from in almost a week. Darius is convinced that the place is "haunted" and plans to search the place, but is brushed off by Alfred. Alfred tries to talk with Earn, but Earn is also busy with managing the concert. As Alfred prepares to perform, a fan introduces him on stage and is told by Earn to get off the stage.

After the concert is over, Earn sees Alfred, Darius and Socks (Hugh Coles) trying to find Alfred's phone, which disappeared. As Alfred tries to remember the last time he saw the phone, he brings up that he had it at the meet and greet with a boy who had cancer. Earn then contacts security to stop the boy but is informed that the boy is being rushed out of the building for a "cancer attack". Earn intercepts the paramedics and the boy, Marvy. While Marvy is initially supportive, Earn frenetically starts checking him and is booed by everyone present, forcing him to leave and not finding the phone.

Earn then deduces that the boy who presented Alfred, Wiley (Samuel Blenkin), could've taken it as he was backstage throughout the day. Earn contacts the venue manager, who states that Wiley is his nephew and does not believe he took it. As the manager surprisingly does not have Wiley's phone number, Earn takes Wiley's resume to contact him. They call Wiley, who finds it suspicious why they would call fans randomly. Socks then takes the phone and threatens him to go back to the venue with the phone, until Alfred takes the phone away from him and tries to reason with Wiley but Wiley hangs up.

Wiley returns to the venue, despite the threat. Wiley denies being involved in the robbery and his talk seems to unnerve Alfred, as it appears to include many of his desires and past events, which could only be found in his phone. Earn and Alfred then decide to use the good cop/bad cop tactic, but Wiley deviates from the subject. When he asks for a phone call, he gives Alfred's phone number, prompting Alfred to nearly attack him. Wiley then farts in a panic and states he is 32, something the stage manager refuses to believe given his youthful appearance. As Earn tries to make the manager see Wiley's strange behavior, Socks returns, revealing that the address Wiley provided was for a Cirque du Soleil venue.

Alfred then privately talks with Wiley, stating that his most personal items are on the phone and he needs it back. Wiley once again deviates from the conversation, expressing admiration for Alfred's mixtape, Postal, and takes a guitar to sing. Alfred is surprisingly moved by the song and Wiley leaves the venue. Earn, Alfred, Darius and Socks then board the bus to leave the venue, with Socks apologizing to Alfred for his behavior. Earn receives a message from Van, stating she is fine. As everyone boards, Socks is revealed to have taken Alfred's phone and tosses it in a trash container before boarding the bus.

== Production ==
=== Development ===
"Sometimes shows just be over my head acting fake deep. Where's the poop jokes?"

— Official description in the press release for the episode.

In March 2022, FX announced that the fifth episode of the season would be titled "Cancer Attack" and that it would be written by supervising producer Jamal Olori, and directed by executive producer Hiro Murai. This was Olori's third writing credit, and Murai's nineteenth directing credit.

== Reception ==
=== Viewers ===
The episode was watched by 0.290 million viewers, earning a 0.1 in the 18-49 rating demographics on the Nielson ratings scale. This means that 0.1 percent of all households with televisions watched the episode. This was a slight increase from the previous episode, which was watched by 0.260 million viewers with a 0.1 in the 18-49 demographics.

=== Critical reviews ===
"Cancer Attack" received positive reviews from critics. The review aggregator website Rotten Tomatoes reported a 100% approval rating for the episode, based on 5 reviews with an average rating of 8/10.

Michael Martin of The A.V. Club gave the episode a "B+" and wrote, "Ultimately, 'Cancer Attack' comes off as both highly comic and somewhat minor key. It's partly because the show has set the bar so high for itself that an episode like this doesn't feel quite A-grade."

Alan Sepinwall of Rolling Stone wrote, "It's a dark comic payoff to another singular episode of this show — an episode that is also even funnier the second time than the first. Al may be worried that he's lost it; Atlanta certainly hasn't." Charles Holmes of The Ringer wrote, "For the show to compete with the landscape it created it needed to change, but within that metamorphosis a lot has been lost. It's as entertaining as it is frustrating, a fairy tale in which the villain is known, but the happy ending is far from promised."

Jordan Taliha McDonald of Vulture gave the episode a 4 star rating out of 5 and wrote, "Genuine connection is evading Earn at every step, and to uncover the source of this absence, he will have to embark on yet another quest for answers, an interrogation of the self." Deshawn Thomas /Film wrote, "I liked this episode a lot more than 'The Big Payback' for a number of reasons. I don't mind that the series will likely feature more 'standalone' episodes without the main cast, but there's something a bit clumsy about them so far. Maybe that'll improve. We'll see." Kyndall Cunningham of The Daily Beast wrote, "With this 'surprise' ending, I'm slightly worried that we're now going to have to be invested in this Socks character, whose presence hasn't been that amusing."

== Analysis ==
The character of Wiley was analyzed by many industry trades, with many considering the possibility that the character is a ghost. Evidence used one of the opening scenes, where Darius planned to search the venue as he believes it may be haunted by ghosts, only for Alfred to state "Yo, as long as it's not another Milwaukee man, I'm cool", a reference to urban legends regarding The Rave/Eagles Club. The date of the episode's airing, April 14, also coincided with "Milwaukee Day", a local day in the area.

Cracked.com further elaborated on Wiley, "if the unnerving events at the Budapest venue were inspired to some degree by the Milwaukee stories, Buddy Holly becomes an interesting thematic jumping point. So much of this season has manifested the ghosts of racial injustice that people accept as everyday parts of life. Music legend Buddy Holly inarguably took what was happening in the Black music scene and repackaged it for a white audience. In Atlanta, Al's phone is taken, and importantly, it contains his new musical ideas, a literal embodiment of his creativity and artistry, stolen by a white associate. And our 'ghost' Wiley is not entirely un-Buddy Holly-like. Sure, he's not American, and he doesn't wear thick glasses, but he's still a scrawny guy with a similar haircut who also turns out to be a guitar player and singer."
