= Ibra Ake =

Nigerian-American artist

- Citizenship: Nigerian American
- Occupations: Director; Producer; Photographer
- Relatives: Claude Ake (father)
- Awards: Grammy Award for Best Music Video (2019)

Ibra Ake is a Nigerian American artist. He has worked as a director, screenwriter, producer, photographer, and creative director. He is best known for his work as a writer on the FX show, Atlanta, and director on Beyonce's visual album, Black is King. In 2019, he won a Grammy as a producer on Childish Gambino's music video, "This Is America".

== Career ==
=== Photography ===
Ibra Ake started off as a portrait and fashion photographer, shooting for various Condé Nast publications, beauty brands, and music acts.

=== Childish Gambino ===
Through photography Ake met Donald Glover at a time when Glover was still a rising musician under the name Childish Gambino. After becoming friends, they started to share ideas and Ake became Glover's creative director. This collaboration led to countless other projects with Glover, as well as with the other members of the collective, Royalty - their creative group that was formed in 2012. Ake has served as creative director for almost all of Childish Gambino's albums and tours.

=== Atlanta ===
Ake has written numerous episodes for the first three seasons of the Emmy Award–winning series Atlanta. He also directed an episode from season three, "White Fashion," and has also guided the show's marketing outreach.

=== Film ===
Ake was a producer on the short visual film, Guava Island that was shot in Cuba by Hiro Murai and starred Donald Glover, Rihanna, and Leticia Wright.

In 2020, he directed and consulted on Beyonce's visual album, Black is King, specifically the videos for "Brown Skin Girl", "Water," and "Keys to the Kingdom."

=== Television ===
Ake wrote and directed an episode of the TV series, Swarm.

=== Other ===
Notable creative direction projects include: Tiwa Savage's 49-99; Spotify's RapCaviar Pantheon; Adidas, Donald Glover Presents; Pause with Sam Jay; Saturday Night Live; and Pharos.

== Awards ==
At the 61st Annual Grammy Awards in 2019, Ibra Ake won a Grammy for Best Music Video, as a producer for Childish Gambino's viral and acclaimed music video for "This is America".

== Family ==
Ake is the son of Claude Ake, a renowned Nigerian political scientist.
