= Hart family murders =

2018 murder–suicide in California, US

Coordinates: 39.7023005°N 123.803873°W

- Ciera, Sarah, Hannah, Markis, Abigail, Devonte, Jennifer and Jeremiah Hart
- Location: Mendocino County, California, U.S.
- Date: March 26, 2018; 8 years ago
- Attack type: Familicide, filicide, murder–suicide
- Deaths: 8 (including both perpetrators)
- Injuries: 0
- Victims: 6 adopted children
- Perpetrators: Jennifer and Sarah Hart

The Hart family murders were a murder–suicide that took place on March 26, 2018, in Mendocino County, California, United States. Jennifer Hart (38) and her wife, Sarah Hart (38), killed themselves and their six adopted children: Ciera (12), Abigail (14), Jeremiah (14), Devonte (15), Hannah (16), and Markis (19). Jennifer intentionally drove their sports utility vehicle off a cliff, killing everyone in the family. Jennifer was in the driver's seat, and Sarah was in the front passenger seat.

== Background ==
Jennifer Jean Hart (June 4, 1979 – March 26, 2018) and Sarah Margaret Hart (April 8, 1979 – March 26, 2018, née Gengler) were both from South Dakota; Jennifer originated from Huron, Sarah from Big Stone City, although some sources claim Ortonville, Minnesota – adjacent to Big Stone City – as Sarah's hometown. Both women were the eldest children of their families. Jennifer had two siblings and Sarah had three siblings. According to her father, Jennifer was not raised as a Lutheran but sought it out in college.

Jennifer attended Huron High School. Sarah attended Ortonville High School in Minnesota. The two women attended and began their relationship at Northern State University (NSU); Sarah had initially attended the University of Minnesota for one semester before transferring to NSU, while Jennifer started at Augustana University before transferring in 1999. Both women majored in elementary education, with Sarah focusing on special education. After Sarah graduated in 2002, Jennifer left the university without graduating. In 2005, Sarah asked a local court to have her last name altered to match her partner's. The couple went to Connecticut to be married in 2009; at the time same-sex marriage in the United States was legal only in Connecticut and Massachusetts.

On Facebook, Jennifer stated that the women were initially closeted when they lived in South Dakota, and that when they decided to come out they lost friends. They moved to Alexandria, Minnesota, in 2004, where both women worked at a Herberger's store. In the new location, they made a choice to be open about their relationship. Jennifer worked miscellaneous jobs until she became a stay-at-home mom in 2006, while Sarah became a manager at Herberger's. After a period of living in West Linn, Oregon, the Harts moved to an unincorporated area near Woodland, Washington; Sarah became a manager at a Kohl's in Hazel Dell. The couple were living near Woodland at the time of the murders.

The Harts received funds from the state of Texas, covering their six adopted children, which accounted for almost 50% of the family's income. Members of Jennifer's and Sarah's families stated that the two women distanced themselves from them, although both families were accepting of their sexual orientation. Jennifer estranged herself from her father after 2001. State government reports stated that the couple cut off contact with their relatives because of criticism about their parenting.

== Adoption ==
All of the children the Harts adopted had Black African ancestry. The birth mother of one set of the children was White.

Prior to adopting their six children, the Harts were foster parents to a 15-year-old girl. A week before their first three children were due to arrive, the Harts dropped the girl off at a scheduled therapist appointment. The therapist then informed the girl that the Harts would not be coming back for her.

Abigail (born 2003), Hannah Jean (born 2002), and Markis Hart (born 1998) were adopted by the Harts from Colorado County, Texas; the placement came on March 4, 2006, and they were adopted that September. In June 2008, they adopted three additional children: Ciera Maija (born 2005), Devonte Jordan (born 2002), and Jeremiah Hart (born 2004), originating from Houston. After their biological mother, Sherry Davis, lost custody due to substance abuse problems in August 2006, the Davis children were given to their paternal aunt, Priscilla Celestine, under the condition that they have no contact with their biological mother. However, after she was required to work another shift, Celestine allowed Davis to babysit the children, which a case worker observed. As a result, the children were removed from Celestine's care and a court prevented Celestine from obtaining permanent custody. The Davis children were put into foster care; their older brother, Dontay, was not adopted by the Harts due to behavioral issues. Ciera was sometimes referred to as "Sierra".

Prior to the murders, 12-year-old Devonte came into the national spotlight when he was photographed crying while embracing a police officer during a 2014 protest in Portland, Oregon, resulting from the Ferguson unrest. The image became known as the "hug felt 'round the world." Jennifer was very active on social media and used Facebook to project an image of a loving, happy family while also advocating for her Progressive beliefs on race and politics, as well as trips the family went on. This helped mask some of the problems within the family. One allegation of child abuse from 2013 touched upon Jennifer's use of Facebook, saying that "the kids pose and are made to look like one big happy family, but after the photo event, they go back to looking lifeless."

== Abuse ==
=== Minnesota ===
In 2008, while the family was living in Minnesota, a teacher observed bruises on Hannah's left arm and was told she had been hit by Jennifer with a belt. Within months, all six children had been pulled out of the public school system for a year. In 2010, Abigail said that she had "owies" on her back and stomach and stated that she felt threatened by the Harts, who had beaten her and held her head in cold water over a penny they assumed that she had stolen. When authorities became involved, all children claimed that they had been spanked constantly and deprived of food. Sarah took responsibility for the abuse, pled guilty to assault and was sentenced to community service for a year. One year later, Hannah reportedly told a school nurse that she had not eaten all day; Sarah claimed that Hannah was merely "playing the food card" and recommended that she just be given water. Soon afterward, all six children were taken out of public schools and were homeschooled from then on.

=== Oregon ===
In 2013, Oregon authorities were notified of the abuse allegations in Minnesota. Their investigation included separate interviews of everyone in the family, as well as interviews of people who knew the family. Two family friends stated that the children were forced to raise their hands before speaking, could not wish each other a happy birthday, and could not laugh at the dinner table. There were other reports that the children were poorly fed and looked small for their ages. One family friend reported that Jennifer had ordered a pizza for the children, but each was only allowed to have a small slice. When Jennifer discovered that the pizza was gone, she punished the children by not feeding them breakfast and forcing them to lie on their bed for five hours. Friends also stated that the children acted "scared to death of Jen" and likened them to "trained robots".

However, the interviews of the children themselves revealed no new incidents of abuse, nor did they mention anything that had happened in Minnesota. When Jennifer herself was interviewed, she claimed that any family problems were the results of others not being tolerant to two lesbian mothers with six African-American children. In the end, the investigation could not conclude whether the Harts were guilty of anything or whether there was a "safety threat".

=== Washington ===
In August 2017, after the Harts moved to the Woodland, Washington area, Hannah jumped out of her second-story bedroom window at around 1:30 a.m. and approached the residence of her next-door neighbors, the DeKalbs. Hannah reportedly pleaded, "Don't make me go back! They're racists and they abuse us!" Soon afterwards, the Harts found Hannah and took her back home. The following day, Jennifer attempted to explain the incident by claiming that Hannah was lying, that the children occasionally acted out because they were "drug babies", and that Hannah's biological mother was bipolar.

After this incident, the DeKalb family came into contact with Devonte, who constantly begged for food and asked the DeKalbs not to tell Jennifer about these requests. In later conversations with Devonte, he told them that his adoptive mothers withheld food as punishment and that the children were sometimes abused. This, combined with the earlier incident with Hannah, made the DeKalbs report the Harts to both the police and to the Washington State Department of Social and Health Services (DSHS). Case workers from DSHS tried to reach the Harts twice: once on March 23, 2018—three days before the murders—and once on the day of the murders.

== Murders and suicides ==
On March 26, 2018, Jennifer and Sarah Hart murdered all six of the children when Jennifer drove their vehicle, a GMC Yukon XL, over a 100-foot (30 m) cliff on California State Route 1, in Mendocino County, California, near Westport. The bodies of five of the children (Hannah, Markis, Jeremiah, Abigail, and Ciera) were found in or near the vehicle, which had landed upside down on a beach below the cliff. The body of Devonte had not been found as of April 2019. A superior court judge ruled in 2019 that Devonte was in the vehicle at the time of the crash, and a death certificate was signed on April 3 of that year.

Expert analysis of the SUV's internal air bag-deploying computer determined that the Yukon had been intentionally driven off the edge of the cliff from a standing stop, accelerating to 20 mph (32 km/h) in 3 seconds with the throttle at 100%. A fourteen-member coroner's jury unanimously ruled the case a murder–suicide. The inquest was called to determine cause of death, but not any responsibility in the civil or criminal fields. The California Highway Patrol stated that criminal prosecution was not possible due to the deaths of any responsible parties.

Toxicology results showed that Jennifer's blood alcohol content was over the legal limit at the time of the crash (notable since she rarely drank leading to speculation she had done so to reduce her inhibition towards the act), and that both Sarah and two of the children had diphenhydramine in their systems. Sarah had made Google searches before the crash, inquiring about the lethality of Benadryl and the nature of death by drowning. Her searches also included "No-kill shelters for dogs"; the family's two dogs were found inside the Hart family home. The Mendocino County Sheriff's Department officially closed the case and released declassified records in 2019.

According to an incident report following the murders, Sarah told a co-worker "[that] she wish[ed] someone told her it was okay not to have a big family. Then she and Jennifer would not have adopted the children."

== In popular culture ==
An episode of the television series Atlanta was inspired by the Hart case. The episode, called "Three Slaps", had Loquareeous, a character inspired by Devonte.

In the 2024 novella collection American Spirits, author Russell Banks included the story "Homeschooling", which fictionalizes the Hart family murders.

In Slate magazine, Rachelle Hampton opined that child protective services authorities give harsher treatment to African-American parents and guardians compared to white parents and guardians, citing how the authorities did not resolve the Hart case.

== See also ==
- Disappearance of Susan Powell
- Filicide
- List of homicides in California
- Clarke family murders
- Murders of Andrew Bagby and Zachary Turner
