= Three Slaps =

- Atlanta episode
- Episode no.: Season 3 Episode 1
- Directed by: Hiro Murai
- Written by: Stephen Glover
- Cinematography by: Christian Sprenger
- Editing by: Kyle Reiter; Isaac Hagy
- Production code: XAA03001
- Original air date: March 24, 2022
- Running time: 36 minutes

Guest appearances
- Jamie Neumann as Gayle; Laura Dreyfuss as Amber; Christopher Farrar as Loquareeous; Tobias Segal as Earnest

Episode chronology
← Previous "Crabs in a Barrel"	Next → "Sinterklaas Is Coming to Town"
- Atlanta season 3

"Three Slaps" is the first episode of the third season of the American comedy-drama television series Atlanta. It is the 22nd overall episode of the series and was written by executive producer Stephen Glover, and directed by executive producer Hiro Murai. It was first broadcast on FX in the United States on March 24, 2022, airing back-to-back with the follow-up episode, "Sinterklaas is Coming to Town".

The series is set in Atlanta and follows Earnest "Earn" Marks, as he tries to redeem himself in the eyes of his ex-girlfriend Van, who is also the mother of his daughter Lottie; as well as his parents and his cousin Alfred, who raps under the stage name "Paper Boi"; and Darius, Alfred's eccentric right-hand man. For the season, the characters find themselves in Europe in the middle of a European Tour.

The episode focuses on a dream being had by Earn of an African American boy, Loquareeous, who lives with his mother and grandfather and is boisterous at school. The white teachers and administrators at his school are troubled by his mother and grandfather's perceived abusive behavior and call social services when Loquareeous's family physically assaults him in front of the guidance counselor. Through errors in communication, he winds up in a foster home with two white, hippie women, who have adopted several other black children who silently work for them in their home and garden. The episode was inspired by the Hart family murders.

According to Nielsen Media Research, the episode was seen by an estimated 0.310 million household viewers and gained a 0.1 ratings share among adults aged 18–49. The episode received critical acclaim, with critics praising the performances, directing, writing, cinematography and creepy atmosphere. The episode was also praised for it not acting as a de facto premiere, as none of the main characters apart from Earn appear, nor are the events of the past seasons mentioned.

== Plot ==
At Lake Lanier at night, White, a white man (Tobias Segal) and Black, a black man (Tyrell Munn), are out on the water in a small boat, fishing near a bridge. The white man tells a story about the town beneath them, populated by black people, that was flooded to make the lake. In the process, he says, people who refused to leave drowned, and the lake is now haunted. He says these black people were so prosperous and successful that they were "almost white", opening a discussion of what constitutes "whiteness", in which he proclaims that black and white people are both cursed. As the scene turns darker, the white man turns around to reveal his eyes missing and the black man is grabbed by the hands of the souls of the black people in the lake.

The scene then turns to a classroom, revealing the scene to be the dream of an African American boy named Loquareeous (Christopher Farrar), who dozed off at his desk. When the teacher announces that they will be taking a field trip to see the new Black Panther movie, Loquareeous dances with joy, cheered on by his classmates. But the teacher disapproves, and he gets into trouble when he continues to dance despite her ordering him to stop. Loquareeous' mother and grandfather meet with the principal and the counselor. While his mother insists that her child be put in detention, the counselor suggests that Loquareeous is acting out because the schoolwork is too challenging for him, and that he belongs in special ed, with the mentally disabled children. The counselor then runs into his mother in the hall, as she forces Loquareeous to dance before giving an intense warning about how white people can harm and kill him if he does not take their rules seriously. His grandfather lightly slaps him three times, as well. The white counselor considers this to be child abuse and reports the events to child protective services, who show up at Loquareeous' house along with the police. His mother mistakenly believes Loquareeous has called the police on his family. Hurt, and not realizing what has actually happened, she kicks him out.

Loquareeous is put into a foster home, where a married, white lesbian couple consisting of Amber (Laura Dreyfuss) and Gayle (Jamie Neumann) are his new parents. They have three adopted black children: Lanre, Yves and Fatima, who are totally silent, sickly and thin, and only communicate with him with their eyes and facial expressions. Loquareeous begins noticing a strange behavior with Amber and Gayle, who seem to force the kids into adopting their alternative lifestyle and is further frustrated when they nickname him "Larry" because of his long, "difficult" name. During dinner, Loquareeous complains that the sparse and undercooked food is "nasty", while Gayle has a violent outburst and breaks the phone when a call from a debt collector interrupts dinner.

The next day, the underfed kids are forced to work in the gardens, and then sell kombucha and produce at the farmer's market. In a series of images based on the viral photos of Devonte Hart, Loquareeous is forced to wear a "Free Hugs" sign and stand in front of their booth. Starving and frightened, and sick from eating the raw chicken they feed the kids, Loquareeous flees his captors and grabs onto a cop, begging him for help. But when Amber and Gayle arrive, they insist they are his parents and that all their children are troubled as they have been rescued from terrible, abusive homes. The white cop believes the white women, not the black child, and forces Loquareeous to return to the white women. The white women then use the photos of Loquareeous clinging to the cop in fear to promote themselves as white saviors in the media.

After neighbors report that the children are sickly and starving, a new child services worker arrives to inspect the house, where she notes the poor treatment that the kids are receiving. Gayle then asks to speak with the worker in private and then returns alone, saying that "everything is fine". That night, Loquareeous is haunted by nightmares that involve finding the social worker's head in the refrigerator. He then wakes up and goes downstairs, where Amber tells him that they will go to the Grand Canyon. As they leave in a van, Loquareeous notices a large body-shaped bag next to the worker's clipboard and pen.

At the van, the kids have a silent conversation where they recognize the women's weird behavior, suspecting that they might try to murder them. That night, Amber and Gayle step outside and free their dog into the wilderness. Amber tearfully expresses regret over taking in the kids, while Gayle states that they are doing the right thing. They then get back into the van and drive off. As they approach the bridge from Loquareeous' dream, they hold hands, preparing to commit murder-suicide. Gayle suddenly notices that their dog is still onboard, and Loquareeous escapes the vehicle before it goes off the bridge and crashes into the lake.

Loquareeous walks back to his previous house by morning and quietly begins to do the dishes and other chores. His mother wakes up and, showing little emotion but relieved, accepts him back into her home. She thinks he ran away, and has no idea the trauma he has survived. He sees news coverage of the other kids by the side of the road, having also escaped the vehicle and survived. An indifferent Loquareeous switches the channel to American Dad. As the floorboard starts to creak, he turns around. The scene cuts back to regular Atlanta characters on tour in Europe, with Earn (Donald Glover) waking up in a hotel room next to a woman, suggesting that Loquareeous' dreams led to false awakenings and that Earn had dreamed all the events of the episode.

== Production ==
=== Development ===
"Wow it's been a minute. I mean, I like this episode about the troubled kid but we waited 50 years for this?"

— Official description in the press release for the episode.

In February 2022, FX announced that the first episode of the season would be titled "Three Slaps" and that it would be written by executive producer Stephen Glover, and directed by executive producer Hiro Murai. This was Stephen Glover's ninth writing credit, and Murai's fifteenth directing credit.

=== Writing ===
The episode was inspired by the Hart family murders in which Jennifer Hart and her wife, Sarah, murdered their six adopted children and themselves by driving the family's sport utility vehicle off a cliff in Mendocino County, California. Loquareeous reenacts several key moments from Devonte Hart's life, who was trying to get help and escape with his siblings, shortly before they were murdered by the adoptive parents. While Devonte's body was never found, he is presumed dead. Unlike the real-life crime, where all the children were murdered, Three Slaps concludes with the children getting out alive and the white couple dead.

An initial sequence where the main character danced upon learning he would go on a trip to see a film was inspired by a video from a school in Atlanta; in the video, several students at Ron Clark Academy danced in celebration upon learning they would see a film.

== Reception ==
=== Viewers ===
The episode was watched by 0.310 million viewers, earning a 0.1 in the 18-49 rating demographics on the Nielson ratings scale. This means that 0.1 percent of all households with televisions watched the episode. This was a 44% decrease from the previous episode, which was watched by 0.553 million viewers with a 0.3 in the 18-49 demographics.

=== Critical reviews ===
"Three Slaps" received critical acclaim. The review aggregator website Rotten Tomatoes reported a 95% approval rating for the episode, based on 21 reviews, with an average rating of 8.8/10. The site's consensus states: "Atlanta reintroduces itself with a self-contained premiere that may initially come across as a digression, but winds up reaffirming the series' core thesis with horrifying power."

Michael Martin of The A.V. Club gave the episode an "A" and wrote, "I haven't been able to get this episode out of my mind for days. It haunts and reverberates, producing the same kind of prolonged hangover HBO Sunday night dramas once did." Ben Travers of IndieWire gave the episode an "A−" and wrote, "Tuning in for the surprise was even more fun than tearing through the ensuing discussion. Maintaining that level of originality without jumping the shark is difficult, especially after so many years (and so many new shows). But here we are again. Atlanta is back, and with it, our rapt attention."

Alan Sepinwall of Rolling Stone wrote, "Together, 'Three Slaps' and 'Sinterklaas is Coming to Town' are a reminder of everything Atlanta can be and do, whether it's the stark nightmare of the former or the back-to-basics ensemble shenanigans of the latter." Darren Franich of Entertainment Weekly gave the episode an A− and wrote, "The show's early years look prophetic now in many ways. It tapped a deep vein of racial disparity and capitalist brutality, all while nailing the complete existential ruin of social media right before hating Silicon Valley went mainstream. The first two episodes of season 3 find the show pushing its boundaries even as it rebuilds its core foundation."

Jordan Taliha McDonald of Vulture gave the episode a 4 star rating out of 5 and wrote, "This episode was a rough return, but one of the small moments of tenderness was when Loquareeous returns home to his mother. If I'm being honest, I was not feeling his mom, but I hope that was the best bowl of spaghetti she ever made 'cause after everything he'd been through? That baby deserves it!" Dan Jackson of Thrillist wrote, "This is not a show that's resting on its laurels or coasting on past success. In fact, the series isn't even relying on its charismatic cast to lure viewers back into the fold." Kelly Lawler of USA Today gave the premiere a 3.5 star rating out of 4 and wrote, "there was never a question of whether there's a place for "Atlanta" all these years later. Good TV shows are consistent, but the great ones know how to change and grow with their characters and with the times. Atlanta has always been one of the greats."

Mashable SEA ranked the episode the 16th best episode of 2022.
