= New Jazz (Atlanta) =

- Atlanta episode
- Episode no.: Season 3 Episode 8
- Directed by: Hiro Murai
- Written by: Donald Glover
- Cinematography by: Stephen Murphy
- Editing by: Kyle Reiter
- Production code: XAA03003
- Original air date: May 5, 2022
- Running time: 31 minutes

Guest appearances
- Liam Neeson as himself; Ava Grey as Lorraine

Episode chronology
← Previous "Trini 2 De Bone"	Next → "Rich Wigga, Poor Wigga"
- Atlanta season 3

"New Jazz" is the eighth episode of the third season of the American comedy-drama television series Atlanta. It is the 29th overall episode of the series and was written by series creator and main actor Donald Glover and directed by executive producer Hiro Murai. It was first broadcast on FX in the United States on May 5, 2022.

The series is set in Atlanta and follows Earnest "Earn" Marks, as he tries to redeem himself in the eyes of his ex-girlfriend Van, who is also the mother of their daughter Lottie; as well as his parents and his cousin Alfred, who raps under the stage name "Paper Boi"; and Darius, Alfred's eccentric right-hand man. For the season, the characters find themselves in Europe in the middle of a concert tour. In the episode, Alfred and Darius use drugs while walking through Amsterdam and Alfred gets lost in the red-light district.

According to Nielsen Media Research, the episode was seen by an estimated 0.305 million household viewers and gained a 0.1 ratings share among adults aged 18–49. The episode received critical acclaim, with critics praising the episode's humor, performances, originality and Liam Neeson's guest appearance; though some were critical of his involvement.

== Plot ==
In Amsterdam, Earn (Donald Glover) meets with Alfred (Brian Tyree Henry) and Darius (Lakeith Stanfield) at a coffee shop. Earn gives them passes for a spa session and both Alfred and Darius leave to spend the day there. While heading to the spa, Alfred notes a man with a blanket and a Goofy cap outside a doorway, convulsing and weeping profusely. Darius warns Alfred not to be like the man.

After consuming space cakes, Alfred and Darius separate by mistake at a red-light district. Alfred flees from a group of obnoxious schoolboys who recognize him, hiding in an undisclosed location as he watches them steal a baby from a pram and throw it around to each other like a football. He inspects the building and finds a woman crying. When he asks her what is happening, he realizes they are in an acting performance. As he continues exploring, he finds himself in an art gallery. He has a conversation with a histrionic American trans woman named Lorraine (Ava Grey), who criticizes most of Alfred's personality but catches Alfred's attention.

As night surprisingly falls quickly, Lorraine takes Alfred with her friends to a club named "Cancel Club", where Alfred is nicknamed "New Jazz". He feels uncomfortable when her friends question his possible relationship with Lorraine and leaves their table. At the bar counter, he meets Liam Neeson, who recounts one of his scandals involving his desire to get into a fight and kill a black man in the 1970s to avenge the rape of a friend of his. Neeson shows deep remorse for his actions, but surprises Alfred by stating that he doesn't like black people for nearly ruining his career and considers them "mortal enemies", claiming he and all other white people don’t have to learn anything if they don’t want to. He then leaves the club. Lorraine then takes Alfred out of the club just as the presenter introduces him.

As Lorraine and Alfred leave, the night has turned into day pretty quickly. Alfred decides he had enough and starts leaving, causing an argument between him and Lorraine. She declares that she was only trying to help him by being rude to him, and accuses him of foolishly giving control of his finances to his friends and family. Alfred, wearing the Goofy cap Lorraine gave him, collapses in a doorway. She leaves him with a blanket; in a surreal sequence, Darius and Alfred walk past him, reminiscent of the scene at the beginning. He then loses consciousness.

Later, Alfred wakes up in his hotel room recovering with Earn by his side, who found him in the streets. When Alfred asks about Lorraine, Earn says, "Your mom?", prompting Alfred to change the subject. As Earn is about to leave, Alfred asks him about the ownership of his masters and Earn says that Alfred himself owns them. Earn leaves while Alfred stays to rest.

== Production ==
=== Development ===
"Al and Darius walk around Amsterdam. Psssh, I could make a way better tv show than this."

— Official description in the press release for the episode.

In April 2022, FX announced that the eighth episode of the season would be titled "New Jazz" and that it would be written by series creator and main actor Donald Glover, and directed by executive producer Hiro Murai. This was Glover's seventh writing credit, and Murai's 20th directing credit.

=== Casting ===
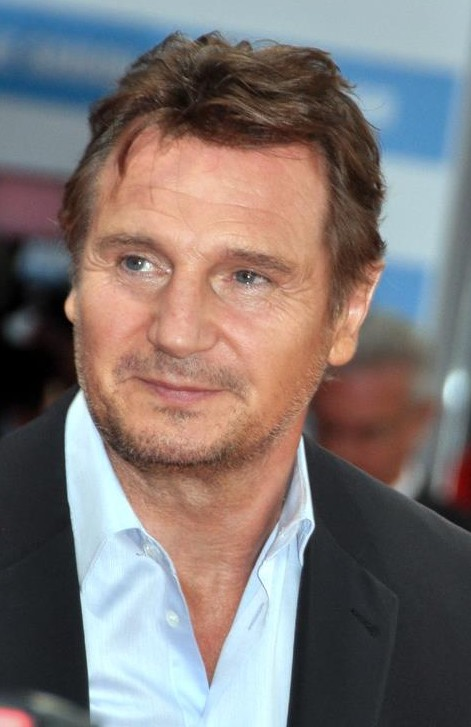
Liam Neeson guest stars in the episode as himself.

Liam Neeson appears in the episode as himself. Neeson references a real-life scandal in 2019; while promoting his film Cold Pursuit, he said that he generated his character's "primal" anger by recounting an experience he had 40 years ago, in which a female friend of his had been raped by a stranger. After learning the attacker was a black man, Neeson said that he spent a week going "up and down areas with a cosh, hoping some 'black bastard' would come out of a pub and have a go" so that Neeson "could kill him". In the interview, he also said he was ashamed of the experience and that the things he did and said were "horrible". He said, "It's awful [...] but I did learn a lesson from it, when I eventually thought, 'What the fuck are you doing?'" Neeson himself was originally apprehensive about appearing on the show, wanting to move on. Glover thought the situation of the fictionalized Neeson subverting his apologies would be hilarious and would truly show that Neeson was sorry. It was not until he spoke with Jordan Peele that he accepted the role.

Men's Health viewed the scene as nearly succeeding at "lulling viewers into a false sense of empathy for a man willing to own up to his past misdeeds. But then, reality takes a backseat to surrealism once more." It also stated, "Whatever the reason, he just delivered Atlanta one of its most shocking and memorable scenes that'll have everyone talking about him — and his history — again, for better or worse."

== Reception ==
=== Viewers ===
The episode was watched by 0.305 million viewers, earning a 0.1 in the 18-49 rating demographics on the Nielson ratings scale. This means that 0.1 percent of all households with televisions watched the episode. This was a massive 100% increase from the previous episode, which was watched by 0.152 million viewers with a 0.04 in the 18-49 demographics.

=== Critical reviews ===
"New Jazz" received critical acclaim. The review aggregator website Rotten Tomatoes reported a 100% approval rating for the episode, based on 7 reviews with an average rating of 8.5/10.

Michael Martin of The A.V. Club gave the episode an "A−" and writing, "If Atlanta had let this season's European tour end without at least one scene in which Darius and Al get high in Amsterdam, they would have squandered a natural character beat and risked a fan revolt. So here it is, the episode where the cannabis connoisseurs sample the fare at a local weed café and just let things unfold. But 'New Jazz' isn't mere fan service, and it wanders far from the path of least resistance; the setup is the least predictable thing about this deep and deeply funny episode. And then there is That Unpublicized Cameo, which exceeds all instant expectations."

Alan Sepinwall of Rolling Stone wrote, "'New Jazz' — the first episode of the series with the Donald Glover/Hiro Murai writer/director combo since 'Teddy Perkins' — is more experience than mystery, and doesn't seem hugely concerned with the truth of these questions. But it's also an engrossingly weird, funny, and sad spotlight on our main character. This season's occasional detours back to America have been interesting, but Atlanta with the regular cast remains on another level."

Jordan Taliha McDonald of Vulture gave the episode a 4 star rating out of 5 and wrote, "Throughout the third season of Atlanta, the question of power and the limits of satire have weighed heavily on the show and the writing of its characters." Alison Herman of The Ringer wrote, "In a season that's otherwise pushed the show in new directions, 'New Jazz' feels like Atlanta getting back to basics, not to mention its larger plot. We still don't know what's up with Van's strange behavior, or whether Al will get his creative mojo back. But 'New Jazz' does articulate the tensions that come with the crew's acclimation to its new altitude. Now a smooth operator, can Earn hold on to the loyalty that made Al keep him close in the first place? And if Al can't rely on Earn or Darius to tell it like it is, who's left to keep him anchored? These are questions Atlanta has mostly deferred this year in favor of larger observations about blackness and culture. Just in time for the home stretch, they’re finally back at center stage." Deshawn Thomas of /Film wrote, "So what does this mean? Perhaps this was all a manifestation of Al's anxiety and apprehension surrounding his fame as a rapper. Lorraine's putdowns could have been his hidden fears about the people closest to him and his ignorance about who owns the rights to his music. Maybe he was recently involved in controversy that had him feeling 'canceled', which would explain the presence of an unrepentant Liam Neeson as well as the name of the club. Whatever reality may be, all of these events prompt Al to confront his fears in the end."

Kyndall Cunningham of The Daily Beast was more critical, writing "you could say that, because Atlanta is a show that is primarily purported to be for black audiences, we also don't need these 'rigorous' lessons on "white privilege". Maybe this is just an elaborate way for Glover to tell black people on the internet to stop being less outraged. Maybe he feels powerful enough in his career that he likes doing famous white people needless favors because he can. Either way, the humorless, shocking cameo doesn't rescue a pretty underwhelming episode. It's nice to revisit Paper Boi’s struggles navigating fame and new money, but Atlanta still feels distracted."
