= Tobias Segal =

American actor

- Born: Philadelphia, Pennsylvania
- Occupation: Actor
- Years active: 2002–present

Tobias Segal is an American actor, best known for his work on stage and in the independent film The Other America, which appeared at the SlamDance Film Festival and Philadelphia Film Festival in April 2004. In 2002 he became one of the youngest actors to win a Barrymore Award, which he won for Outstanding Supporting Actor in a play for his performance in Equus. He appeared in The Bridge Project at Kevin Spacey's Old Vic Theatre (spring and summer 2009) under the direction of Sam Mendes, followed by a brief Broadway run of The Miracle Worker, before portraying Earl in the John Wick films John Wick: Chapter 2 and John Wick: Chapter 3 – Parabellum. In 2022, Segal portrayed the white version of Donald Glover's Earnest "Earn" Marks in the character's dream episodes of the third season of Atlanta, referred to as "E". He currently lives in Brooklyn, New York.

== Early life ==
Segal was born and raised in Chester County, Pennsylvania, and has been active in the theatre community in Philadelphia. In 2004 Segal took a break from Temple University to work with area professional theaters.

== Career ==
Over the past few years, Segal has made appearances on Law & Order and in 2006 he appeared in the major motion picture Rocky Balboa. He also acted in such plays as Merlin's Fire, Twelfth Night, Disco Pigs, and According to Goldman.

In Fall 2011, he played the character "U. Gene" on the Fox science-fiction series Fringe. In 2011, he appeared in Body of Proof in episode 3, "Helping Hand". In 2012, he starred in the independent comedy-drama Petunia opposite Thora Birch and Michael Urie. He won a Best Supporting Actor award at the Orlando Film Fest in 2013 for his role in B-Side.

== Filmography ==
Year	Title	Role	Notes
2004	The Other America	Ari	
2006	Rocky Balboa	Robert's Friend #1	
2008	The New Year Parade		
2008	Animal Husbandry	Franc Schmidt	
2011	Fringe	U. Gene	Season 4 Episode 7, "Wallflower"
2011	Martha Marcy May Marlene	Cult Member	
2012	Men in Black 3	1969 MIB Agent #1	
2012	Petunia	Charlie Petunia	
2013	This Is Where We Live	August	
2013 - 2016	The Good Wife	Tyler Hopkins	6 episodes
2013	Golden Boy	Ronan Burke	Episode: "McKenzie on Fire"
2013	B-Side	Jonas	
2013	R.I.P.D.	Clement Smokewagon Perkins	
2013	Reservoir	Peter Dewey	
2014	She's Lost Control	Christopher	
2014	The Drop	Briele	
2017	John Wick: Chapter 2	Earl	
2017	After Party	Jim	
2017	Mindhunter	Dwight	Season 1 Episode 3
2019	Glass	Surveillance Security Guard	
2019	Colewell	Andy	
2019	John Wick: Chapter 3 – Parabellum	Earl	
2022	Atlanta	E	2 Episodes + 1 uncredited
