= List of awards and nominations received by Abbott Elementary =

Abbott Elementary awards and nominations
Awards and nominations
Award	Wins	Nominations
AARP Movies for Grownups Awards	1	2
American Film Institute Awards	1	1
Artios Awards	0	2
Astra Creative Arts TV Awards	1	4
Astra TV Awards	10	28
Black Reel Television Awards	14	37
Critics' Choice Awards	3	17
Dorian Awards	2	7
GLAAD Media Awards	0	2
Golden Globe Awards	3	10
Golden Trailer Awards	2	6
Gotham Independent Film Awards	0	2
Humanitas Prize	0	1
ICG Publicists Awards	2	2
Independent Spirit Awards	1	3
Make-Up Artists and Hair Stylists Guild Awards	2	5
MTV Movie & TV Awards	0	1
NAACP Image Awards	16	34
Nickelodeon Kids' Choice Awards	0	8
Peabody Awards	1	1
People's Choice Awards	0	7
Primetime Creative Arts Emmy Awards	1	8
Primetime Emmy Awards	3	29
Producers Guild of America Awards	0	1
Satellite Awards	0	4
Screen Actors Guild Awards	1	7
Set Decorators Society of America Awards	0	1
Television Critics Association Awards	4	14
Writers Guild of America Award	0	5

Totals (Note: Certain award groups do not simply award one winner. They acknowledge several different recipients, have runners-up, and have third place. Since this is a specific recognition and is different from losing an award, runner-up mentions are considered wins in this award tally. For simplification and to avoid errors, each award in this list has been presumed to have had a prior nomination.)
- Wins: 68
- Nominations: 249

Abbott Elementary is an American mockumentary sitcom created by Quinta Brunson for ABC. The series follows a group of teachers at an underfunded Philadelphia public elementary school who continue to be passionate about their work despite the odds stacked against them and their students. Alongside Brunson, who also stars as teacher Janine Teagues, the cast includes Tyler James Williams, Janelle James, Lisa Ann Walter, Chris Perfetti, William Stanford Davis, and Sheryl Lee Ralph.

Since premiering in December 2021, Abbott Elementary has received widespread critical acclaim and numerous accolades. At the 80th Golden Globe Awards, the series won Best Television Series – Musical or Comedy, with Brunson winning Best Actress in a Television Series – Musical or Comedy and Williams winning Best Supporting Actor. At the 75th Primetime Emmy Awards, Brunson won Outstanding Lead Actress in a Comedy Series, while Ralph won the award at the 74th Primetime Emmy Awards for Outstanding Supporting Actress in a Comedy Series. The series has also been recognized repeatedly by the NAACP Image Awards and Black Reel Television Awards, winning Outstanding Comedy Series at both ceremonies in multiple years, and by the Television Critics Association Awards, which named it Program of the Year in 2022.

== Awards and nominations ==
Award	Year	Category	Nominee(s)	Result	Ref.
American Film Institute Awards	2023	Top 10 Television Programs	Abbott Elementary	Won (Note: This award does not have a single winner, but recognizes multiple programs.)	
AARP Movies for Grownups Awards	2023	Best Actress (TV/Streaming)	Sheryl Lee Ralph	Won	
AARP Movies for Grownups Awards	2023	Best TV Series	Abbott Elementary	Nominated	
Artios Awards	2023	Outstanding Achievement in Casting – Television Pilot and First Season Comedy Series	Wendy O'Brien	Nominated	
Artios Awards	2024	Outstanding Achievement in Casting – Television Comedy Series	Wendy O'Brien	Nominated	
Astra TV Awards	2022	Best Broadcast Network Series, Comedy	Abbott Elementary	Won	
Astra TV Awards	2022	Best Actress in a Broadcast Network or Cable Series, Comedy	Quinta Brunson	Won	
Astra TV Awards	2022	Best Supporting Actor in a Broadcast Network or Cable Series, Comedy	Chris Perfetti	Nominated	
Astra TV Awards	2022	Best Supporting Actor in a Broadcast Network or Cable Series, Comedy	Tyler James Williams	Nominated	
Astra TV Awards	2022	Best Supporting Actress in a Broadcast Network or Cable Series, Comedy	Janelle James	Won	
Astra TV Awards	2022	Best Supporting Actress in a Broadcast Network or Cable Series, Comedy	Sheryl Lee Ralph	Nominated	
Astra TV Awards	2022	Best Directing in a Broadcast Network or Cable Series, Comedy	Randall Einhorn (for "Pilot")	Nominated	
Astra TV Awards	2022	Best Writing in a Broadcast Network or Cable Series, Comedy	Quinta Brunson (for "Pilot")	Won	
Astra TV Awards	2023	Best Broadcast Network Series, Comedy	Abbott Elementary	Won	
Astra TV Awards	2023	Best Actress in a Broadcast Network or Cable Series, Comedy	Quinta Brunson	Won	
Astra TV Awards	2023	Best Supporting Actor in a Broadcast Network or Cable Series, Comedy	Tyler James Williams	Won	
Astra TV Awards	2023	Best Supporting Actor in a Broadcast Network or Cable Series, Comedy	William Stanford Davis	Nominated	
Astra TV Awards	2023	Best Supporting Actress in a Broadcast Network or Cable Series, Comedy	Janelle James	Nominated	
Astra TV Awards	2023	Best Supporting Actress in a Broadcast Network or Cable Series, Comedy	Lisa Ann Walter	Nominated	
Astra TV Awards	2023	Best Supporting Actress in a Broadcast Network or Cable Series, Comedy	Sheryl Lee Ralph	Nominated	
Astra TV Awards	2023	Best Directing in a Broadcast Network or Cable Series, Comedy	Randall Einhorn (for "Teacher's Conference")	Nominated	
Astra TV Awards	2023	Best Writing in a Broadcast Network or Cable Series, Comedy	Quinta Brunson (for "Development Day")	Nominated	
Astra TV Awards	2024	Best Broadcast Network Comedy Series	Abbott Elementary	Nominated	
Astra TV Awards	2024	Best Actress in a Broadcast Network or Cable Comedy Series	Quinta Brunson	Won	
Astra TV Awards	2024	Best Supporting Actor in a Broadcast Network or Cable Comedy Series	Chris Perfetti	Nominated	
Astra TV Awards	2024	Best Supporting Actor in a Broadcast Network or Cable Comedy Series	Tyler James Williams	Nominated	
Astra TV Awards	2024	Best Supporting Actress in a Broadcast Network or Cable Comedy Series	Janelle James	Nominated	
Astra TV Awards	2024	Best Supporting Actress in a Broadcast Network or Cable Comedy Series	Sheryl Lee Ralph	Won	
Astra TV Awards	2024	Best Supporting Actress in a Broadcast Network or Cable Comedy Series	Lisa Ann Walter	Nominated	
Astra TV Awards	2024	Best Directing in a Broadcast Network or Cable Comedy Series	Randall Einhorn (for "Party")	Won	
Astra TV Awards	2024	Best Writing in a Broadcast Network or Cable Comedy Series	Quinta Brunson (for "Career Day")	Nominated	
Astra TV Awards	2024	Best Guest Actor in a Comedy Series	Bradley Cooper	Nominated	
Astra TV Awards	2024	Best Guest Actress in a Comedy Series	Tatyana Ali	Nominated	
Astra Creative Arts TV Awards	2023	Best Casting in a Comedy Series	Abbott Elementary	Nominated	
Astra Creative Arts TV Awards	2023	Best Guest Actor in a Comedy Series	Leslie Odom Jr.	Nominated	
Astra Creative Arts TV Awards	2023	Best Guest Actress in a Comedy Series	Ayo Edebiri	Won	
Astra Creative Arts TV Awards	2023	Best Guest Actress in a Comedy Series	Taraji P. Henson	Nominated	
Black Reel Television Awards	2022	Outstanding Comedy Series	Abbott Elementary	Won	
Black Reel Television Awards	2022	Outstanding Actress, Comedy Series	Quinta Brunson	Won	
Black Reel Television Awards	2022	Outstanding Supporting Actor, Comedy Series	Tyler James Williams	Won	
Black Reel Television Awards	2022	Outstanding Supporting Actress, Comedy Series	Janelle James	Won	
Black Reel Television Awards	2022	Outstanding Supporting Actress, Comedy Series	Sheryl Lee Ralph	Nominated	
Black Reel Television Awards	2022	Outstanding Directing, Comedy Series	Matthew A. Cherry (for "Ava vs. Superintendent")	Won	
Black Reel Television Awards	2022	Outstanding Writing, Comedy Series	Quinta Brunson (for "Pilot")	Won	
Black Reel Television Awards	2022	Outstanding Guest Actor, Comedy Series	Reggie Hayes	Nominated	
Black Reel Television Awards	2022	Outstanding Guest Actor, Comedy Series	Orlando Jones	Won	
Black Reel Television Awards	2023	Outstanding Comedy Series	Abbott Elementary	Won	
Black Reel Television Awards	2023	Outstanding Lead Performance, Comedy Series	Quinta Brunson	Won	
Black Reel Television Awards	2023	Outstanding Supporting Performance, Comedy Series	William Stanford Davis	Nominated	
Black Reel Television Awards	2023	Outstanding Supporting Performance, Comedy Series	Janelle James	Nominated	
Black Reel Television Awards	2023	Outstanding Supporting Performance, Comedy Series	Sheryl Lee Ralph	Won	
Black Reel Television Awards	2023	Outstanding Supporting Performance, Comedy Series	Tyler James Williams	Nominated	
Black Reel Television Awards	2023	Outstanding Directing, Comedy Series	Dime Davis (for "Read-A-Thon")	Nominated	
Black Reel Television Awards	2023	Outstanding Directing, Comedy Series	Ken Whittingham (for "Mom")	Nominated	
Black Reel Television Awards	2023	Outstanding Writing, Comedy Series	Ava Coleman (for "Mom")	Nominated	
Black Reel Television Awards	2023	Outstanding Writing, Comedy Series	Brittani Nichols (for "Franklin Institute")	Nominated	
Black Reel Television Awards	2023	Outstanding Writing, Comedy Series	Jordan Temple (for "Educator of the Year")	Nominated	
Black Reel Television Awards	2023	Outstanding Guest Performance, Comedy Series	Zack Fox	Nominated	
Black Reel Television Awards	2023	Outstanding Guest Performance, Comedy Series	Taraji P. Henson	Won	
Black Reel Television Awards	2023	Outstanding Guest Performance, Comedy Series	Orlando Jones	Nominated	
Black Reel Television Awards	2023	Outstanding Guest Performance, Comedy Series	Leslie Odom Jr.	Nominated	
Black Reel Television Awards	2023	Outstanding Makeup & Hairstyling	Alisha L. Baijounas & Moira Fraizer	Nominated	
Black Reel Television Awards	2024	Outstanding Comedy Series	Abbott Elementary	Won	
Black Reel Television Awards	2024	Outstanding Lead Performance in a Comedy Series	Quinta Brunson	Nominated	
Black Reel Television Awards	2024	Outstanding Supporting Performance in a Comedy Series	Janelle James	Won	
Black Reel Television Awards	2024	Outstanding Supporting Performance in a Comedy Series	Sheryl Lee Ralph	Nominated	
Black Reel Television Awards	2024	Outstanding Supporting Performance in a Comedy Series	Tyler James Williams	Nominated	
Black Reel Television Awards	2024	Outstanding Guest Performance in a Comedy Series	Tatyana Ali	Nominated	
Black Reel Television Awards	2024	Outstanding Guest Performance in a Comedy Series	Keegan-Michael Key	Nominated	
Black Reel Television Awards	2024	Outstanding Guest Performance in a Comedy Series	Cree Summer	Nominated	
Black Reel Television Awards	2024	Outstanding Directing in a Comedy Series	Randall Einhorn (for "Party")	Won	
Black Reel Television Awards	2024	Outstanding Writing in a Comedy Series	Quinta Brunson (for "Career Day, Part 1")	Nominated	
Black Reel Television Awards	2024	Outstanding Writing in a Comedy Series	Morgan Murphy (for "Librarian")	Nominated	
Black Reel Television Awards	2024	Outstanding Makeup & Hairstyling	Constance Foe & Moira Fraizer	Nominated	
Critics' Choice Awards	2023	Best Comedy Series	Abbott Elementary	Won	
Critics' Choice Awards	2023	Best Actress in a Comedy Series	Quinta Brunson	Nominated	
Critics' Choice Awards	2023	Best Supporting Actor in a Comedy Series	Chris Perfetti	Nominated	
Critics' Choice Awards	2023	Best Supporting Actor in a Comedy Series	Tyler James Williams	Nominated	
Critics' Choice Awards	2023	Best Supporting Actress in a Comedy Series	Janelle James	Nominated	
Critics' Choice Awards	2023	Best Supporting Actress in a Comedy Series	Sheryl Lee Ralph	Won	
Critics' Choice Awards	2024	Best Comedy Series	Abbott Elementary	Nominated	
Critics' Choice Awards	2024	Best Actress in a Comedy Series	Quinta Brunson	Nominated	
Critics' Choice Awards	2024	Best Supporting Actress in a Comedy Series	Janelle James	Nominated	
Critics' Choice Awards	2024	Best Supporting Actress in a Comedy Series	Sheryl Lee Ralph	Nominated	
Critics' Choice Awards	2025	Best Comedy Series	Abbott Elementary	Nominated	
Critics' Choice Awards	2025	Best Actress in a Comedy Series	Quinta Brunson	Nominated	
Critics' Choice Awards	2025	Best Supporting Actor in a Comedy Series	Tyler James Williams	Nominated	
Critics' Choice Awards	2025	Best Supporting Actress in a Comedy Series	Janelle James	Nominated	
Critics' Choice Awards	2026	Best Comedy Series	Abbott Elementary	Nominated	
Critics' Choice Awards	2026	Best Supporting Actor in a Comedy Series	Chris Perfetti	Nominated	
Critics' Choice Awards	2026	Best Supporting Actress in a Comedy Series	Janelle James	Won	
Dorian Awards	2022	Best TV Comedy	Abbott Elementary	Won	
Dorian Awards	2022	Best TV Performance	Quinta Brunson	Nominated	
Dorian Awards	2022	Best Supporting TV Performance	Janelle James	Nominated	
Dorian Awards	2023	Best TV Comedy	Abbott Elementary	Won	
Dorian Awards	2023	Best TV Performance - Comedy	Quinta Brunson	Nominated	
Dorian Awards	2023	Best Supporting TV Performance - Comedy	Janelle James	Nominated	
Dorian Awards	2023	Best Supporting TV Performance - Comedy	Sheryl Lee Ralph	Nominated	
GLAAD Media Awards	2023	Outstanding Comedy Series	Abbott Elementary	Nominated	
GLAAD Media Awards	2025	Outstanding Comedy Series	Abbott Elementary	Nominated	
Golden Globe Awards	2023	Best Television Series – Musical or Comedy	Abbott Elementary	Won	
Golden Globe Awards	2023	Best Actress in a Television Series – Musical or Comedy	Quinta Brunson	Won	
Golden Globe Awards	2023	Best Supporting Actor in a Television Series – Comedy/Musical or Drama	Tyler James Williams	Won	
Golden Globe Awards	2023	Best Supporting Actress in a Television Series – Comedy/Musical or Drama	Janelle James	Nominated	
Golden Globe Awards	2023	Best Supporting Actress in a Television Series – Comedy/Musical or Drama	Sheryl Lee Ralph	Nominated	
Golden Globe Awards	2024	Best Television Series – Musical or Comedy	Abbott Elementary	Nominated	
Golden Globe Awards	2024	Best Actress – Television Series Musical or Comedy	Quinta Brunson	Nominated	
Golden Globe Awards	2025	Best Television Series – Musical or Comedy	Abbott Elementary	Nominated	
Golden Globe Awards	2025	Best Actress – Television Series Musical or Comedy	Quinta Brunson	Nominated	
Golden Globe Awards	2026	Best Television Series – Musical or Comedy	Abbott Elementary	Nominated	
Golden Trailer Awards	2023	Most Innovative Advertising for a TV/Streaming Series	"Traveling Teachers Lounge with Scholastic" (ABC)	Nominated	
Golden Trailer Awards	2023	Best Viral Campaign for a TV / Streaming Series	Abbott Elementary at SDCC 2022 (ABC)	Won	
Golden Trailer Awards	2025	Best Comedy (TV Spot) for a TV/Streaming Series	"Crossover Pepe Silvia Promo" (ABC)	Nominated	
Golden Trailer Awards	2025	Most Original (TV Spot) for a TV/Streaming Series	"Season 4 Premiere Dio-Drama" (ABC)	Nominated	
Golden Trailer Awards	2025	Most Innovative Advertising for a TV/Streaming Series	"A.V.A. Fest at San Diego Comic-Con 2024" (ABC)	Nominated	
Golden Trailer Awards	2025	Best Billboard (for Feature Film or TV/Streaming Series)	"Season 4 Diorama Billboard" (ABC)	Won	
Gotham Independent Film Awards	2022	Breakthrough Series – Long Form	Abbott Elementary	Nominated	
Gotham Independent Film Awards	2022	Outstanding Performance in a New Series	Janelle James	Nominated	
Humanitas Prize	2022	Comedy Teleplay	Quinta Brunson (for "Pilot")	Nominated	
ICG Publicists Awards	2023	Television Showman of the Year	Quinta Brunson	Won	
ICG Publicists Awards	2023	Maxwell Weinberg Award for Television Publicity Campaign	Celia Sacks & Sarah Teicher	Won	
Independent Spirit Awards	2023	Best Lead Performance in a New Scripted Series	Quinta Brunson	Won	
Independent Spirit Awards	2023	Best Supporting Performance in a New Scripted Series	Janelle James	Nominated	
Independent Spirit Awards	2023	Best Supporting Performance in a New Scripted Series	Sheryl Lee Ralph	Nominated	
Make-Up Artists and Hair Stylists Guild Awards	2023	Best Contemporary Make-Up in a Television Series, Television Limited or Miniseries or Television New Media Series	Alisha L. Baijounas, Jenn Bennett, Constance Foe, and Emilia Werynska	Nominated	
Make-Up Artists and Hair Stylists Guild Awards	2023	Best Contemporary Hair Styling in a Television Series, Television Limited or Miniseries or Television New Media Series	Moira Frazier, Dustin Osborne, and Christina R. Joseph	Won	
Make-Up Artists and Hair Stylists Guild Awards	2024	Best Contemporary Make-Up in a Television Series, Television Limited or Miniseries or Television New Media Series	Alisha L. Baijounas, Emilia Werynska, Jenn Bennett, and Constance Foe	Nominated	
Make-Up Artists and Hair Stylists Guild Awards	2025	Best Contemporary Make-Up in a Television Series, Television Limited or Miniseries or Television New Media Series	Constance Foe, Jenn Bennett, Naima Jamal, Patrikk Johnson	Nominated	
Make-Up Artists and Hair Stylists Guild Awards	2025	Best Contemporary Hair Styling in a Television Series, Television Limited or Miniseries or Television New Media Series	Moira Frazier, Dustin Osborne, Christina Joseph, Johnny Lomeli, LaLisa Turner	Won	
MTV Movie & TV Awards	2023	Best Comedic Performance	Quinta Brunson	Nominated	
NAACP Image Awards	2023	Outstanding Comedy Series	Abbott Elementary	Won	
NAACP Image Awards	2023	Outstanding Actress in a Comedy Series	Quinta Brunson	Won	
NAACP Image Awards	2023	Outstanding Breakthrough Creative (Television)	Quinta Brunson	Won	
NAACP Image Awards	2023	Outstanding Supporting Actor in a Comedy Series	Tyler James Williams	Won	
NAACP Image Awards	2023	Outstanding Supporting Actor in a Comedy Series	William Stanford	Nominated	
NAACP Image Awards	2023	Outstanding Supporting Actress in a Comedy Series	Janelle James	Won	
NAACP Image Awards	2023	Outstanding Supporting Actress in a Comedy Series	Sheryl Lee Ralph	Nominated	
NAACP Image Awards	2023	Outstanding Writing for a Comedy Series	Brittani Nichols (for "Student Transfer")	Won	
NAACP Image Awards	2023	Outstanding Writing for a Comedy Series	Quinta Brunson (for "Development Day")	Nominated	
NAACP Image Awards	2024	Outstanding Comedy Series	Abbott Elementary	Won	
NAACP Image Awards	2024	Outstanding Actress in a Comedy Series	Quinta Brunson	Won	
NAACP Image Awards	2024	Outstanding Supporting Actor in a Comedy Series	Tyler James Williams	Nominated	
NAACP Image Awards	2024	Outstanding Supporting Actor in a Comedy Series	William Stanford	Won	
NAACP Image Awards	2024	Outstanding Supporting Actress in a Comedy Series	Janelle James	Nominated	
NAACP Image Awards	2024	Outstanding Supporting Actress in a Comedy Series	Sheryl Lee Ralph	Nominated	
NAACP Image Awards	2024	Outstanding Guest Performance	Ayo Edebiri	Nominated	
NAACP Image Awards	2024	Outstanding Writing for a Comedy Series	Brittani Nichols	Nominated	
NAACP Image Awards	2024	Outstanding Writing for a Comedy Series	Ava Coleman	Nominated	
NAACP Image Awards	2025	Outstanding Comedy Series	Abbott Elementary	Won	
NAACP Image Awards	2025	Outstanding Actress in a Comedy Series	Quinta Brunson	Won	
NAACP Image Awards	2025	Outstanding Supporting Actor in a Comedy Series	Tyler James Williams	Nominated	
NAACP Image Awards	2025	Outstanding Supporting Actor in a Comedy Series	William Stanford Davis	Nominated	
NAACP Image Awards	2025	Outstanding Supporting Actress in a Comedy Series	Janelle James	Nominated	
NAACP Image Awards	2025	Outstanding Supporting Actress in a Comedy Series	Wanda Sykes	Nominated	
NAACP Image Awards	2025	Outstanding Guest Performance	Cree Summer	Nominated	
NAACP Image Awards	2025	Outstanding Guest Performance	Keegan-Michael Key	Nominated	
NAACP Image Awards	2025	Outstanding Writing in a Comedy Series	Brittani Nichols	Nominated	
NAACP Image Awards	2025	Outstanding Writing in a Comedy Series	Jordan Temple	Nominated	
NAACP Image Awards	2026	Outstanding Comedy Series	Abbott Elementary	Won	
NAACP Image Awards	2026	Outstanding Actress in a Comedy Series	Quinta Brunson	Won	
NAACP Image Awards	2026	Outstanding Supporting Actor in a Comedy Series	William Stanford Davis	Won	
NAACP Image Awards	2026	Outstanding Supporting Actress in a Comedy Series	Janelle James	Won	
NAACP Image Awards	2026	Outstanding Directing in a Comedy Series	Tyler James Williams	Won	
NAACP Image Awards	2026	Outstanding Writing in a Comedy Series	Lizzy Darrell	Nominated	
Nickelodeon Kids' Choice Awards	2024	Favorite Family TV Show	Abbott Elementary	Nominated	
Nickelodeon Kids' Choice Awards	2024	Favorite Female TV Star (Family)	Janelle James	Nominated	
Nickelodeon Kids' Choice Awards	2024	Favorite Female TV Star (Family)	Quinta Brunson	Nominated	
Nickelodeon Kids' Choice Awards	2025	Favorite Family TV Show	Abbott Elementary	Nominated	
Nickelodeon Kids' Choice Awards	2025	Favorite Female TV Star (Family)	Janelle James	Nominated	
Nickelodeon Kids' Choice Awards	2026	Favorite Family TV Show	Abbott Elementary	Pending	
Nickelodeon Kids' Choice Awards	2026	Favorite Female TV Star (Family)	Quinta Brunson	Pending	
Nickelodeon Kids' Choice Awards	2026	Favorite Male TV Star (Family)	Tyler James Williams	Pending	
Peabody Awards	2023	Entertainment honorees	Abbott Elementary	Won	
People's Choice Awards	2022	The Show of 2022	Abbott Elementary	Nominated	
People's Choice Awards	2022	The Comedy Show of 2022	Abbott Elementary	Nominated	
People's Choice Awards	2022	The Female TV Star of 2022	Quinta Brunson	Nominated	
People's Choice Awards	2022	The Comedy TV Star of 2022	Quinta Brunson	Nominated	
People's Choice Awards	2024	The Comedy Show of the Year	Abbott Elementary	Nominated	
People's Choice Awards	2024	The Female TV Star of the Year	Quinta Brunson	Nominated	
People's Choice Awards	2024	The Comedy TV Star of the Year	Quinta Brunson	Nominated	
Primetime Emmy Awards	2022	Outstanding Comedy Series	Quinta Brunson, Justin Halpern, Patrick Schumacker, Randall Einhorn, Brian Rubenstein, Scott Sites, and Jordan Temple	Nominated	
Primetime Emmy Awards	2022	Outstanding Lead Actress in a Comedy Series	Quinta Brunson (for "Pilot")	Nominated	
Primetime Emmy Awards	2022	Outstanding Supporting Actor in a Comedy Series	Tyler James Williams (for "Work Family")	Nominated	
Primetime Emmy Awards	2022	Outstanding Supporting Actress in a Comedy Series	Janelle James (for "Ava vs. Superintendent")	Nominated	
Primetime Emmy Awards	2022	Outstanding Supporting Actress in a Comedy Series	Sheryl Lee Ralph (for "New Tech")	Won	
Primetime Emmy Awards	2022	Outstanding Writing for a Comedy Series	Quinta Brunson (for "Pilot")	Won	
Primetime Emmy Awards	2023	Outstanding Comedy Series	Quinta Brunson, Justin Halpern, Patrick Schumacker, Randall Einhorn, Brian Rubenstein, Jordan Temple, Brittani Nichols, Josh Greene, and Scott Sites	Nominated	
Primetime Emmy Awards	2023	Outstanding Lead Actress in a Comedy Series	Quinta Brunson (for "Teacher Conference")	Won	
Primetime Emmy Awards	2023	Outstanding Supporting Actor in a Comedy Series	Tyler James Williams (for "Educator of the Year")	Nominated	
Primetime Emmy Awards	2023	Outstanding Supporting Actress in a Comedy Series	Janelle James (for "Fundraiser")	Nominated	
Primetime Emmy Awards	2023	Outstanding Supporting Actress in a Comedy Series	Sheryl Lee Ralph (for "Fire")	Nominated	
Primetime Emmy Awards	2024	Outstanding Comedy Series	Quinta Brunson, Justin Halpern, Patrick Schumacker, Randall Einhorn, Brian Rubenstein, Scott Sites, and Jordan Temple	Nominated	
Primetime Emmy Awards	2024	Outstanding Lead Actress in a Comedy Series	Quinta Brunson (for "Party")	Nominated	
Primetime Emmy Awards	2024	Outstanding Supporting Actor in a Comedy Series	Tyler James Williams (for "Double Date")	Nominated	
Primetime Emmy Awards	2024	Outstanding Supporting Actress in a Comedy Series	Janelle James (for "Career Day, Part 1")	Nominated	
Primetime Emmy Awards	2024	Outstanding Supporting Actress in a Comedy Series	Sheryl Lee Ralph (for "Librarian")	Nominated	
Primetime Emmy Awards	2024	Outstanding Directing for a Comedy Series	Randall Einhorn (for "Party")	Nominated	
Primetime Emmy Awards	2024	Outstanding Writing for a Comedy Series	Quinta Brunson (for "Career Day")	Nominated	
Primetime Emmy Awards	2025	Outstanding Comedy Series	Quinta Brunson, Patrick Schumacker, Justin Halpern, Randall Einhorn, Brian Rubenstein, Jordan Temple, Brittani Nichols, Josh Greene, Ava Coleman, Richie Edelson, and Scott Sites	Nominated	
Primetime Emmy Awards	2025	Outstanding Lead Actress in a Comedy Series	Quinta Brunson (for "Strike")	Nominated	
Primetime Emmy Awards	2025	Outstanding Supporting Actress in a Comedy Series	Janelle James (for "Music Class")	Nominated	
Primetime Emmy Awards	2025	Outstanding Supporting Actress in a Comedy Series	Sheryl Lee Ralph (for "100th Day of School")	Nominated	
Primetime Emmy Awards	2025	Outstanding Writing for a Comedy Series	Quinta Brunson (for "Back To School")	Nominated	
Primetime Emmy Awards	2026	Outstanding Comedy Series	Quinta Brunson, Justin Halpern, Patrick Schumacker, Randall Einhorn, Brian Rubenstein, Brittani Nichols, Ava Coleman, Josh Greene, Justin Tan, Kate Peterman, Joya McCrory, Richie Edelson, and Scott Sites	Nominated	
Primetime Emmy Awards	2026	Outstanding Lead Actress in a Comedy Series	Quinta Brunson	Nominated	
Primetime Emmy Awards	2026	Outstanding Supporting Actor in a Comedy Series	Tyler James Williams	Nominated	
Primetime Emmy Awards	2026	Outstanding Supporting Actress in a Comedy Series	Janelle James	Nominated	
Primetime Emmy Awards	2026	Outstanding Directing for a Comedy Series	Randall Einhorn (for "Ballgame")	Nominated	
Primetime Emmy Awards	2026	Outstanding Writing for a Comedy Series	Quinta Brunson (for "Team Building")	Nominated	
Primetime Creative Arts Emmy Awards	2022	Outstanding Casting for a Comedy Series	Wendy O'Brien	Won	
Primetime Creative Arts Emmy Awards	2023	Outstanding Casting for a Comedy Series	Wendy O'Brien and Chris Gehrt	Nominated	
Primetime Creative Arts Emmy Awards	2023	Outstanding Contemporary Hairstyling	Moira Frazier, Dustin Osborne, and Christina Joseph (for "Festival")	Nominated	
Primetime Creative Arts Emmy Awards	2023	Outstanding Guest Actress in a Comedy Series	Taraji P. Henson (for "Mom")	Nominated	
Primetime Creative Arts Emmy Awards	2024	Outstanding Casting for a Comedy Series	Wendy O'Brien and Chris Gehrt	Nominated	
Primetime Creative Arts Emmy Awards	2024	Outstanding Contemporary Hairstyling	Moira Frazier, Dustin Osborne, and Christina Joseph (for "Mother's Day")	Nominated	
Primetime Creative Arts Emmy Awards	2025	Outstanding Contemporary Hairstyling	Moira Frazier, Dustin Osborne, Christina Joseph, Charolette Noon, and Natita Stribling (for "100th Day Of School")	Nominated	
Primetime Creative Arts Emmy Awards	2026	Outstanding Casting for a Comedy Series	Wendy O'Brien and Chris Gehrt	Nominated	
Producers Guild of America Awards	2023	Outstanding Producer of Episodic Television, Comedy	Abbott Elementary	Nominated	
Satellite Awards	2024	Best Comedy or Musical Series	Abbott Elementary	Nominated	
Satellite Awards	2025	Best Comedy or Musical Series	Abbott Elementary	Nominated	
Satellite Awards	2025	Best Actress in a Comedy or Musical Series	Quinta Brunton	Nominated	
Satellite Awards	2025	Best Actor in a Supporting Role in a Series, Miniseries & Limited Series, or Motion Picture Made for Television	Chris Perfetti	Nominated	
Screen Actors Guild Awards	2023	Outstanding Performance by a Female Actor in a Comedy Series	Quinta Brunson	Nominated	
Screen Actors Guild Awards	2023	Outstanding Performance by an Ensemble in a Comedy Series	Quinta Brunson, William Stanford Davis, Janelle James, Chris Perfetti, Sheryl Lee Ralph, Lisa Ann Walter, and Tyler James Williams	Won	
Screen Actors Guild Awards	2024	Outstanding Performance by a Female Actor in a Comedy Series	Quinta Brunson	Nominated	
Screen Actors Guild Awards	2024	Outstanding Performance by an Ensemble in a Comedy Series	Quinta Brunson, William Stanford Davis, Janelle James, Chris Perfetti, Sheryl Lee Ralph, Lisa Ann Walter, and Tyler James Williams	Nominated	
Screen Actors Guild Awards	2025	Outstanding Performance by a Female Actor in a Comedy Series	Quinta Brunson	Nominated	
Screen Actors Guild Awards	2025	Outstanding Performance by an Ensemble in a Comedy Series	Quinta Brunson, William Stanford Davis, Janelle James, Chris Perfetti, Sheryl Lee Ralph, Lisa Ann Walter, and Tyler James Williams	Nominated	
Screen Actors Guild Awards	2026	Outstanding Performance by an Ensemble in a Comedy Series	Quinta Brunson, William Stanford Davis, Janelle James, Chris Perfetti, Sheryl Lee Ralph, Lisa Ann Walter, and Tyler James Williams	Nominated	
Set Decorators Society of America Awards	2024	Best Achievement in Décor/Design of a Half-Hour Single-Camera Series	Cherie Ledwith, Michael Whetstone	Nominated	
Television Critics Association Awards	2022	Program of the Year	Abbott Elementary	Won	
Television Critics Association Awards	2022	Outstanding Achievement in Comedy	Abbott Elementary	Won	
Television Critics Association Awards	2022	Outstanding New Program	Abbott Elementary	Won	
Television Critics Association Awards	2022	Individual Achievement in Comedy	Quinta Brunson	Won	
Television Critics Association Awards	2022	Individual Achievement in Comedy	Janelle James	Nominated	
Television Critics Association Awards	2023	Program of the Year	Abbott Elementary	Nominated	
Television Critics Association Awards	2023	Outstanding Achievement in Comedy	Abbott Elementary	Nominated	
Television Critics Association Awards	2023	Individual Achievement in Comedy	Quinta Brunson	Nominated	
Television Critics Association Awards	2023	Individual Achievement in Comedy	Janelle James	Nominated	
Television Critics Association Awards	2024	Outstanding Achievement in Comedy	Abbott Elementary	Nominated	
Television Critics Association Awards	2024	Individual Achievement in Comedy	Quinta Brunson	Nominated	
Television Critics Association Awards	2025	Outstanding Achievement in Comedy	Abbott Elementary	Nominated	
Television Critics Association Awards	2025	Individual Achievement in Comedy	Janelle James	Nominated	
Television Critics Association Awards	2026	Outstanding Achievement in Comedy	Abbott Elementary	Pending	
Writers Guild of America Award	2023	New Series	Quinta Brunson, Ava Coleman, Riley Dufurrena, Justin Halpern, Joya McCrory, Morgan Murphy, Brittani Nichols, Kate Peterman, Brian Rubenstein, Patrick Schumacker, Justin Tan, Jordan Temple, and Garrett Werner	Nominated	
Writers Guild of America Award	2023	Comedy Series	Quinta Brunson, Ava Coleman, Riley Dufurrena, Justin Halpern, Joya McCrory, Morgan Murphy, Brittani Nichols, Kate Peterman, Brian Rubenstein, Patrick Schumacker, Justin Tan, Jordan Temple, and Garrett Werner	Nominated	
Writers Guild of America Award	2024	Comedy Series	Quinta Brunson, Ava Coleman, Riley Dufurrena, Justin Halpern, Joya McCrory, Morgan Murphy, Brittani Nichols, Kate Peterman, Brian Rubenstein, Patrick Schumacker, Justin Tan, Jordan Temple, and Garrett Werner	Nominated	
Writers Guild of America Award	2025	Comedy Series	Quinta Brunson, Ava Coleman, Riley Dufurrena, Justin Halpern, Joya McCrory, Chad Morton, Morgan Murphy, Brittani Nichols, Rebekka Pesqueira, Kate Peterman, Brian Rubenstein, Patrick Schumacker, Justin Tan, Jordan Temple, Garrett Werner	Nominated	
Writers Guild of America Award	2026	Comedy Series	Quinta Brunson, Ava Coleman, Lizzy Darrell, Riley Dufurrena, Justin Halpern, Joya McCrory, Chad Morton, Morgan Murphy, Brittani Nichols, Rebekka Pesqueira, Kate Peterman, Brian Rubenstein, Patrick Schumacker, Justin Tan, Jordan Temple, Garrett Werner	Nominated	
