= 22nd Annual Black Reel Awards =

Film-industry awards in 2022

22nd Black Reel Awards
- Date: February 28, 2022

Highlights
- Most wins: The Harder They Fall (6)
- Most nominations: The Harder They Fall (20)
- Outstanding Motion Picture: King Richard

The 22nd Annual Black Reel Awards ceremony, presented by the Foundation for the Augmentation of African-Americans in Film (FAAAF) and honoring the best films of 2021, took place on February 28, 2022, and streamed on blackreelawards.com at 5:00 p.m. PST / 8:00 p.m. EST. During the ceremony, FAAAF presented the Black Reel Awards in 24 categories. The film nominations were announced on December 16, 2021.

The Harder They Fall led the nominations with twenty and broke the record of most film nominations; this record was previously held by Black Panther (2018), which received seventeen nominations and a record-breaking ten wins in 2019. The film went on to win a total of six awards, the most wins by any film; King Richard and Passing tied for second place with three wins each, with the former winning Outstanding Motion Picture. The Harder They Fall is also the first western nominated for Outstanding Motion Picture and Outstanding Screenplay from the group. Director Jeymes Samuel tied with Radha Blank for the most individual nominations in a single year with seven; Samuel went on to win for Outstanding Director, Outstanding Emerging Director, and Outstanding Score for The Harder They Fall. At 90 years old, Rita Moreno became the oldest nominee in any category after receiving a nomination for Outstanding Supporting Actress for West Side Story.

The 6th Annual Black Reel Awards for Television nominations were announced on June 16, 2022. The ceremony took place on August 14, 2022. The sitcom Abbott Elementary led all programs with seven wins, including Outstanding Comedy Series, while HBO led all networks and platforms with ten wins from their record forty nominations. Actor Donald Glover led the pack in individual nominations with five, winning one for Outstanding Actor, Comedy Series.

== Film winners and nominees ==
Outstanding Motion Picture	Outstanding Director
King Richard – Will Smith, Tim White and Trevor White, producers; The Harder They Fall – Lawrence Bender, Shawn Carter, James Lassiter and Jeymes Samuel, producers; Passing – Nina Yang Bongiovi, Forest Whitaker, Rebecca Hall and Margot Hand, producers; The Tragedy of Macbeth – Joel Coen, Robert Graf and Frances McDormand, producers; West Side Story – Steven Spielberg, Kristie Macosko Krieger and Kevin McCollum, producers	Jeymes Samuel – The Harder They Fall; Halle Berry – Bruised; Nia DaCosta – Candyman; Reinaldo Marcus Green – King Richard; Rebecca Hall – Passing
Outstanding Actor	Outstanding Actress
Will Smith – King Richard as Richard Williams; Mahershala Ali – Swan Song as Cameron Turner; Winston Duke – Nine Days as Will; Jonathan Majors – The Harder They Fall as Nat Love; Denzel Washington – The Tragedy of Macbeth as Lord Macbeth	Tessa Thompson – Passing as Irene "Reenie" Redfield; Zazie Beetz – The Harder They Fall as Stagecoach Mary; Halle Berry – Bruised as Jackie "Pretty Bull" Justice; Jennifer Hudson – Respect as Aretha Franklin; Taylour Paige – Zola as Aziah "Zola" King
Outstanding Supporting Actor	Outstanding Supporting Actress
Colman Domingo – Zola as Abegunde "X" Olawale; Idris Elba – The Harder They Fall as Rufus Buck; André Holland – Passing as Brian Redfield; Lakeith Stanfield – The Harder They Fall as Cherokee Bill; Jeffrey Wright – The French Dispatch as Roebuck Wright	Aunjanue Ellis – King Richard as Oracene "Brandy" Price; Ariana DeBose – West Side Story as Anita; Regina King – The Harder They Fall as Trudy Smith; Rita Moreno – West Side Story as Valentina; Ruth Negga – Passing as Clare Bellew
Outstanding Breakthrough Performance, Male	Outstanding Breakthrough Performance, Female
Anthony Ramos – In the Heights as Usnavi de la Vega; Deon Cole – The Harder They Fall as Wiley Escoe; Edi Gathegi – The Harder They Fall as Bill Pickett; Joshua Henry – tick, tick... BOOM! as Roger; Caleb McLaughlin – Concrete Cowboy as Cole	Ariana DeBose – West Side Story as Anita; Danielle Deadwyler – The Harder They Fall as Cuffee; Taylour Paige – Zola as Aziah "Zola" King; Saniyya Sidney – King Richard as Venus Williams; Demi Singleton – King Richard as Serena Williams
Outstanding Ensemble	Outstanding Screenplay
The Harder They Fall – Victoria Thomas, casting director; In the Heights – Tiffany Little Canfield and Bernard Telsey, casting directors; King Richard – Rich Delia and Avy Kaufman, casting directors; Passing – Kim Ostroy and Laura Rosenthal, casting directors; Zola – Kim Coleman, casting director	Passing – Rebecca Hall; Candyman – Nia DaCosta, Jordan Peele, and Win Rosenfeld; The Harder They Fall – Jeymes Samuel and Boaz Yakin; In the Heights – Quiara Alegría Hudes; Zola – Janicza Bravo and Jeremy O. Harris
Outstanding Documentary Feature	Outstanding Independent Film
Summer of Soul (...Or, When the Revolution Could Not Be Televised) – Ahmir "Questlove" Thompson; Ailey – Jamila Wignot; Citizen Ashe – Rex Miller and Sam Pollard; My Name Is Pauli Murray – Julie Cohen and Betsy West; Rita Moreno: Just a Girl Who Decided to Go for It – Mariem Pérez Riera	Zola – Janicza Bravo; Concrete Cowboy – Ricky Staub; Nine Days – Edson Oda; Test Pattern – Shatara Michelle Ford; The Water Man – David Oyelowo
Outstanding Short Film	Outstanding Independent Documentary
Coffee – Jordan Pitt; 54 Years Late – Michele Wise Wright; The Door of Return – Kokutekeleza Musebeni and Anna Zhukovets; Junior – Jehnovah Carlisle; The Snakes – Michelle Beck	100 Years from Mississippi – Tarabu Betserai Kirkland; Big Chief, Black Hawk – Jonathan Isaac Jackson; I Still Breathe – Alfred George Bailey; Little Satchmo – John Alexander; UNZIPPED: An Autopsy of American Inequality – Colin K. Gray
Outstanding Foreign-Language Film	Outstanding Voice Performance
African America – Muzi Mthembu (South Africa); Bitter Sugar – Malik Isasis (Tunisia); Faya Dayi – Jessica Beshir (Ethiopia)	Maya Rudolph – The Mitchells vs. the Machines as Linda Mitchell; Eric André – The Mitchells vs. the Machines as Dr. Mark Bowman; Marsai Martin – Spirit Untamed as Prudence "Pru" Granger; Maya Rudolph – Luca as Daniela Paguro; Zoe Saldaña – Vivo as Rosa
Outstanding Emerging Director	Outstanding First Screenplay
Jeymes Samuel – The Harder They Fall; Halle Berry – Bruised; Janicza Bravo – Zola; Rebecca Hall – Passing; Ahmir "Questlove" Thompson – Summer of Soul (...Or, When the Revolution Could Not Be Televised)	Passing – Rebecca Hall; In the Heights – Quiara Alegría Hudes; Zola – Janicza Bravo and Jeremy O. Harris
Outstanding Original Song	Outstanding Score
"Automatic Woman" from Bruised – H.E.R., performer; Van Hunt, H.E.R. and Brittany Hazzard, writers; "Be Alive" from King Richard – Beyoncé, performer; Beyoncé Knowles-Carter and DIXSON, writers; "Guns Go Bang" from The Harder They Fall – Jay-Z and Kid Cudi, performers; Shawn "Jay-Z" Carter, Kid Cudi and Jeymes Samuel, writers; "The Harder They Fall" from The Harder They Fall – Koffee, performer; Shawn "Jay-Z" Carter and Jeymes Samuel, writers; "Here I Am (Singing My Way Home)" from Respect – Jennifer Hudson, performer; Carole King, Jennifer Hudson and Jamie Hartman, writers	The Harder They Fall – Jeymes Samuel; Candyman – Robert Aiki Aubrey; In the Heights – Alex Lacamoire, Lin-Manuel Miranda, and Bill Sherman; Passing – Devonte Hynes; Respect – Kris Bowers
Outstanding Cinematography	Outstanding Costume Design
The Tragedy of Macbeth – Bruno Delbonnel; The Harder They Fall – Mihai Mălaimare Jr.; In the Heights – Alice Brooks; Passing – Edu Grau; West Side Story – Janusz Kamiński	The Harder They Fall – Antoinette Messam; Coming 2 America – Ruth E. Carter; Passing – Marci Rodgers; The Tragedy of Macbeth – Mary Zophres; West Side Story – Paul Tazewell
Outstanding Editing	Outstanding Production Design
The Harder They Fall – Tom Eagles; Bruised – Jacob Craycroft and Terilyn A. Shropshire; King Richard – Pamela Martin; Respect – Avril Beukes; Zola – Joi McMillon	The Tragedy of Macbeth – Stefan Dechant; The Harder They Fall – Martin Whist; In the Heights – Nelson Coates; Passing – Nora Mendis; West Side Story – Adam Stockhausen

=== Honorary awards ===
- Ruby Dee Humanitarian Award – Chaz Ebert
- Vanguard Award – Halle Berry and Nate Moore
- Sidney Poitier Trailblazer Award – Laurence Fishburne
- Oscar Micheaux Memorial Award – Suzanne de Passe

== Films with multiple nominations and awards ==
The following films received multiple nominations:

Nominations	Film
20	The Harder They Fall
13	Passing
9	King Richard
9	Zola
7	In the Heights
7	West Side Story
5	Bruised
5	The Tragedy of Macbeth
4	Respect
3	Candyman
2	Concrete Cowboy
2	The Mitchells vs. the Machines
2	Nine Days
2	Summer of Soul

The following films received multiple awards:

Wins	Film
6	The Harder They Fall
3	King Richard
3	Passing
2	The Tragedy of Macbeth
2	Zola

== Television winners and nominees ==
=== Comedy ===
Outstanding Comedy Series
Abbott Elementary – Quinta Brunson , showrunner (ABC); Atlanta – Donald Glover, showrunner (FX); black-ish – Courtney Lily, showrunner (ABC); Insecure – Prentice Penny, showrunner (HBO); South Side – Bashir Salahuddin and Diallo Riddle, showrunners (HBO Max)
Outstanding Actor, Comedy Series	Outstanding Actress, Comedy Series
Donald Glover as various characters on Atlanta (FX); Anthony Anderson as Andre "Dre" Johnson Sr. on black-ish (ABC); Don Cheadle as Corey on Social Distance (Netflix); Keegan-Michael Key as Aaron Jackson on Schmigadoon! (Apple TV+); Lamorne Morris as Keef on Woke (Hulu)	Quinta Brunson as Janine Teagues on Abbott Elementary (ABC); Issa Rae as Issa Dee on Insecure (HBO); Regina Hall as Dawn Darcy on Black Monday (Showtime); Robin Thede as various characters on A Black Lady Sketch Show (HBO); Tracee Ellis Ross as Dr. Rainbow "Bow" Johnson on black-ish (ABC)
Outstanding Supporting Actor, Comedy Series	Outstanding Supporting Actress, Comedy Series
Tyler James Williams as Gregory Eddie on Abbott Elementary (ABC); Brian Tyree Henry as Alfred ‘Paper Boi’ on Atlanta (FX); Dulé Hill as Bill Williams on The Wonder Years (ABC); Jay Ellis as Lawrence Walker on Insecure (HBO); Lakeith Stanfield as Darius on Atlanta (FX)	Janelle James as Ava Coleman on Abbott Elementary (ABC); Natasha Rothwell as Kelli Penny on Insecure (HBO); Sheryl Lee Ralph as Barbara Howard on Abbott Elementary (ABC); Yvonne Orji as Molly Carter on Insecure (HBO); Zazie Beetz as Van on Atlanta (FX)
Outstanding Guest Actor, Comedy Series	Outstanding Guest Actress, Comedy Series
Orlando Jones as Martin Eddie on Abbott Elementary (ABC); Kofi Siriboe as Crenshaw on Insecure (HBO); Lil Rel Howery as Bishop on South Side (HBO Max); Reginald C. Hayes as Denzel Collins Abbott Elementary (ABC); Sam Richardson as Edwin Akufo on Ted Lasso (Apple TV+)	Quinta Brunson as Patrice on A Black Lady Sketch Show (HBO); Adriyan Rae as Cadace on Atlanta (FX); Da'Vine Joy Randolph as Detective Williams on Only Murders in the Building (Hulu); Michelle Obama as herself on black-ish (ABC); Lizzo as herself on Saturday Night Live (NBC)
Outstanding Directing, Comedy Series	Outstanding Writing, Comedy Series
Abbott Elementary ("Ava vs. Superintendent") – Directed by Matthew A. Cherry (ABC); Atlanta ("Tarrare") – Directed by Donald Glover (FX); Atlanta ("Rich Wigga, Poor Wigga") – Directed by Donald Glover (ABC); The Flight Attendant ("Drowning Woman") – Directed by Pete Chatmon (HBO Max); The Wonder Years ("Love & War") – Directed by Numa Perrier (ABC)	Abbott Elementary ("Pilot") – Written by Quinta Brunson (ABC); Atlanta ("Three Slaps") – Written by Stephen Glover (FX); Atlanta ("Rich Wigga, Poor Wigga") – Written by Donald Glover (FX); Insecure ("Out, Okay?") – Written by Prentice Penny (HBO); Ted Lasso ("Do the Right-est Thing") – Written by Ashley Nicole Black (Apple TV+)

=== Drama ===
Outstanding Drama Series
Bel-Air – T.J. Brady and Rasheed Newson, showrunners (Peacock); Euphoria – Sam Levinson, showrunner (HBO); Lupin – George Kay, showrunner (Netflix); This Is Us – Dan Fogelman, showrunner (NBC); Winning Time: The Rise of the Lakers Dynasty – Max Borenstein, showrunner (HBO)
Outstanding Actor, Drama Series	Outstanding Actress, Drama Series
Sterling K. Brown as Randall Pearson on This Is Us (NBC); Chiwetel Ejiofor as the alien/Faraday on The Man Who Fell to Earth (Showtime); Damson Idris as Franklin Saint on Snowfall (FX); Forest Whitaker as Bumpy Johnson on The Godfather of Harlem (Epix); Omar Sy as Assane Diop on Lupin (Netflix)	Zendaya as Rue Bennett on Euphoria (HBO); Naomie Harris as Justin Falls on The Man Who Fell to Earth (Showtime); Patina Miller as Raquel Thomas on Power Book III: Raising Kanan (Starz); Queen Latifah as Robyn McCall on The Equalizer (CBS); Tawny Cypress as Taissa Turner on Yellowjackets (Showtime)
Outstanding Supporting Actor, Drama Series	Outstanding Supporting Actress, Drama Series
Wood Harris as Spencer Haywood on Winning Time: The Rise of the Lakers Dynasty (HBO); Adrian Holmes as Philip Banks on Bel-Air (Peacock); Clarke Peters as Josiah Falls on The Man Who Fell to Earth (Showtime); Giancarlo Esposito as Gus Fring on Better Call Saul (AMC); Olly Sholotan as Carlton Banks on Bel-Air (Peacock)	Susan Kelechi Watson as Beth Pearson on This Is Us (NBC); Adjoa Andoh as Lady Danbury on Bridgerton (Netflix); Audra McDonald as Liz Lawrence on The Good Fight (Paramount+); Coco Jones as Hilary Banks on Bel-Air (Peacock); Lorraine Toussaint as Viola "Vi" Marsette on The Equalizer (CBS)
Outstanding Guest Actor, Drama Series	Outstanding Guest Actress, Drama Series
Colman Domingo as Ali on Euphoria (HBO); Delroy Lindo as Adrian Boseman on The Good Fight (Paramount+); Jonathan Majors as He Who Remains on Loki (Disney+); Rob Morgan as Officer Powell on Stranger Things (Netflix); Ron Cephas Jones as William Hill on This Is Us (NBC)	Sanaa Lathan as Lisa Arthur on Succession (HBO); CCH Pounder as Vinette Clark on The Good Fight (Paramount+); Cush Jumbo as Luca Quinn on The Good Fight (Paramount+); Rosario Dawson as Ahsoka Tano on The Book of Boba Fett (Disney+); Whoopi Goldberg as Guinan on Star Trek: Picard (Paramount+)
Outstanding Directing, Drama Series	Outstanding Writing, Drama Series
Bridgerton ("The Viscount Who Loved Me") – Directed by Cheryl Dunye (Netflix); Bel-Air ("Dreams and Nightmares") – Directed by Morgan Cooper (Peacock); Better Call Saul ("Axe and Grind") – Directed by Giancarlo Esposito (AMC); This Is Us ("Our Little Island Girl: Part II") – Directed by Kevin Hooks (FX); Winning Time: The Rise of the Lakers Dynasty ("Piece of a Man") – Directed by Tanya Hamilton (HBO)	This Is Us ("Every Version of You") – Written by Kay Oyegun (NBC); Bel-Air ("Dreams and Nightmares") – Written by Malcolm Spellman, Morgan Cooper, T.J. Brady and Rasheed Newson (Peacock); Snowfall ("Celebration") – Written by Walter Mosley (FX); This Is Us ("Our Little Island Girl: Part 2") – Written by Eboni Freeman and Susan Kelechi Watson (NBC); Winning Time: The Rise of the Lakers Dynasty ("Acceptable Loss") – Written by Rodney Barnes and Max Borenstein (FX)

=== Television Movies/Limited Series ===
Outstanding Television Movie or Limited Series
The Last Days of Ptolemy Grey – Diane Houslin, showrunner (AppleTV+); Colin in Black & White – Michael Starrbury, showrunner (Netflix); DMZ – Roberto Patino, showrunner (HBO Max); True Story – Eric Newman, showrunner (Netflix); We Own This City – George Pelecanos, showrunner (HBO)
Outstanding Actor, TV Movie/Limited Series	Outstanding Actress, TV Movie/Limited Series
Samuel L. Jackson as Ptolemy Grey on The Last Days of Ptolemy Grey (AppleTV+); Derek Luke as Greg Taylor on American Refugee (Epix); Jaden Michael as Colin Kaepernick on Colin in Black and White (Netflix); Kevin Hart as Kid on True Story (Netflix); William Jackson Harper as Marcus Watkins on Love Life (HBO Max)	Wunmi Mosaku as Nicole Steele on We Own This City (HBO); Cynthia Erivo as Ambia on Roar (AppleTV+); Rosario Dawson as Alma "Zee" Ortega on DMZ (HBO Max); Viola Davis as Michelle Obama on The First Lady (Showtime); Zoe Kravitz as Angela Childs on KIMI (HBO Max)
Outstanding Supporting Actor, TV Movie/Limited Series	Outstanding Supporting Actress, TV Movie/Limited Series
Glynn Turman as Mose Wright on Women of the Movement (ABC); David Oyelowo as Edward on The Girl Before (HBO Max); Jamie Hector as Sean Suiter on We Own This City (HBO); Michael Ealy as Douglas on The Woman in the House Across the Street from the Girl in the Window (Netflix); Wesley Snipes as Carlton on True Story (Netflix)	Moses Ingram as Reva Sevander on Obi-Wan Kenobi (Disney+); Dominique Fishback as Robyn on The Last Days of Ptolemy Grey (AppleTV+); Natasha Rothwell as Belinda Lindsey on The White Lotus (HBO); Regina Hall as Carmel Schneider on Nine Perfect Strangers (Hulu); Rosario Dawson as Bridget Meyer on Dopesick (Hulu)
Outstanding Directing, TV Movie/Limited Series	Outstanding Writing, TV Movie/Limited Series
The Last Days of Ptolemy Grey ("Robyn") – Directed by Debbie Allen (AppleTV+); Colin in Black & White ("Cornrows") – Directed by Ava DuVernay (Netflix); The Last Days of Ptolemy Grey ("Ptolemy") – Directed by Hanelle Culpepper (AppleTV+); We Own This City – Directed by Reinaldo Marcus Green (HBO); Women of the Movement ("Mother and Son") – Directed by Gina Prince-Bythewood (ABC)	The Last Days of Ptolemy Grey ("Ptolemy") – Written by Walter Mosley; Colin in Black & White ("Cornrows") – Written by Michael Starrbury; Maid ("Sea Glass") – Written by Marcus Gardley; The Last Days of Ptolemy Grey ("Robyn") – Written by Walter Mosley, Jerome Hairston; We Own This City ("Part Three") – Written by D. Watkins

=== Other categories ===
Outstanding Television Documentary or Special	Outstanding Variety, Talk or Sketch - Series or Special
We Need to Talk About Cosby – W. Kamau Bell, director (Showtime); Biography: Bobby Brown – J. Kevin Swain, directors (A&E); Black and Missing – Geeta Gandbhir, Samantha M. Knowles, Yoruba Richen and Nadia Hallgren, directors (HBO); Janet Jackson – Benjamin Hirsch, director (Lifetime); They Call Me Magic – Rick Famuyiwa, director (Apple TV+)	A Black Lady Sketch Show – Robin Thede, showrunner (HBO); Dave Chappelle: The Closer – Sina Sadighi, producer (Netflix); Rothaniel – Bo Burnham, Jerrod Carmichael, Eli Bush, Josh Senior and Matthew Vaughan, producers (HBO); The Amber Ruffin Show – Jason Carden, Jen Sochko, Zoie Mancino, Amber Ruffin, and Jenny Hagel, producers (Peacock); The Daily Show with Trevor Noah – Jen Flanz, showrunner (Comedy Central)
Outstanding Original Song
Euphoria ("I'm Tired")– Written by Labrinth, Zendaya and Sam Levinson, performed by Labrinth and Zendaya (HBO); Insecure ("Get It Girl") – Written by Fresh Kid Ice, Luther Campbell, Lil Jon, Mr. Mixx and Liana Banks; Performed by Saweetie and Raedio (HBO); Queens ("Nasty Girl") – Written by Swizz Beatz, Ludacris and Piles; Performed by Brandy, Eve, Naturi Naughton and Nadine Velazquez (ABC); The Wonder Years ("All I Know") – Written by Scotty Grand, Jacob Yoffee and Roahn Hylton; Performed by Scotty Grand (ABC); We the People ("Change") – Written by H.E.R., Flippa, Maxx Moore and Jeff Gitelman; Perfofmed by H.E.R. (Netflix)
Outstanding Music Supervision	Outstanding Musical Score
Insecure – Kier Lehman (HBO); Atlanta – Jen Malone (FX); Bridgerton – Alexandra Pastvas (Netflix); Euphoria – Jen Malone (HBO); Wu-Tang: An American Saga – Mary Ramos (Hulu)	Insecure– Raphael Saadiq (HBO); Bridgerton – Kris Bowers (Netflix); Euphoria – Labrinth (HBO); Winning Time: The Rise of the Lakers Dynasty – Nicholas Britell and Robert Glasper (HBO); Wu-Tang: An American Saga – RZA (Hulu)

== Television programs with multiple nominations and awards ==
The following programs received multiple nominations:

Nominations	Program
12	Atlanta
10	Insecure
9	Abbott Elementary
7
7	The Last Days of Ptolemy Grey
7	This Is Us
6	Bel-Air
6	Euphoria
5	We Own This City
5	Winning Time: The Rise of the Lakers Dynasty
4	Bridgerton
4	Colin in Black & White
4	The Good Fight
3	A Black Lady Sketch Show
3	The Man Who Fell to Earth
3	True Story
2	Better Call Saul
2	Blackish
2	Black Monday
2	DMZ
2	The Equalizer
2	Lupin
2	Snowfall
2	South Side
2	Ted Lasso
2	Wu-Tang: An American Saga
