= Star Trek: Picard season 2 =

American television series season

Star Trek: Picard
- Season 2
- Promotional poster
- Showrunners: Akiva Goldsman; Terry Matalas
- Starring: Patrick Stewart; Alison Pill; Jeri Ryan; Michelle Hurd; Evan Evagora; Orla Brady; Isa Briones; Santiago Cabrera; Brent Spiner
- No. of episodes: 10

Release
- Original network: Paramount+
- Original release: March 3 – May 5, 2022

Season chronology
- ← Previous; Season 1 Next → Season 3

The second season of the American television series Star Trek: Picard features the character Jean-Luc Picard in the year 2401. He and his companions are trapped in an alternate reality by the extra-dimensional being Q as part of the ultimate trial for Picard, and must travel back to 2024 Los Angeles to save the future of the galaxy. The season was produced by CBS Studios in association with Secret Hideout, Weed Road Pictures, and Roddenberry Entertainment, with Akiva Goldsman and Terry Matalas serving as showrunners.

Patrick Stewart stars as Picard, reprising his role from the series Star Trek: The Next Generation as well as other Star Trek media. Alison Pill, Jeri Ryan, Michelle Hurd, Evan Evagora, Orla Brady, Isa Briones, Santiago Cabrera, and Brent Spiner also star. A second season was in development for months before being officially announced in January 2020, with Matalas and Goldsman replacing first-season showrunner Michael Chabon. Matalas suggested the time travel story to save costs after the expensive first season, and returned to the visual style of The Next Generation with new production designer Dave Blass. Delayed from a planned June 2020 production start by the COVID-19 pandemic, filming began in California in February 2021 and lasted until September with location shooting around Los Angeles. During filming, Matalas switched focus to showrunning the third season, which was shot back-to-back with the second. The second season features special guest stars returning from previous Star Trek media, including John de Lancie as Q and Whoopi Goldberg as Guinan.

The season premiered on the streaming service Paramount+ on March 3, 2022, and ran for 10 episodes until May 5. It was estimated to have high viewership and audience demand, and received positive reviews from critics. The season was nominated for four Primetime Creative Arts Emmy Awards and several other awards.

== Episodes ==
No. overall	No. in season	Title	Directed by	Written by	Original release date
11	1	"The Star Gazer"	Doug Aarniokoski	Akiva Goldsman & Terry Matalas	March 3, 2022
Retired admiral Jean-Luc Picard rejects the romantic advances of his housekeeper Laris, a year-and-a-half after the death of her partner Zhaban. After giving a speech to a new class of cadets—including his former ward Elnor—in his role as chancellor of Starfleet Academy, Picard visits his old friend and bartender Guinan to talk about his life-long avoidance of romantic relationships. In deep space, Captain Chris Rios and Dr. Agnes Jurati of the USS Stargazer investigate an anomaly that broadcasts a request to negotiate entry into the Federation with Picard. They are joined by Seven of Nine, a vigilante flying Rios's old ship La Sirena, and a fleet of starships including the USS Excelsior which has Elnor and Picard's old first officer Raffi Musiker on board. When Picard arrives, a Borg ship emerges from the anomaly and transports their Queen onto the Stargazer. The Queen begins assimilating the entire fleet, prompting Picard to initiate the Stargazer's self-destruct. After the explosion, Picard wakes up in a version of his home and is greeted by the extra-dimensional being Q, who has returned to test Picard again.
12	2	"Penance"	Doug Aarniokoski	Teleplay by : Akiva Goldsman & Terry Matalas and Christopher Monfette; Story by : Michael Chabon and Akiva Goldsman & Terry Matalas and Christopher Monfette	March 10, 2022
Picard learns from Q that he and his companions are in an alternate timeline where humanity has formed the xenophobic "Confederation of Earth", systematically eradicating or enslaving alien races. Picard, the Confederation's greatest military commander, has been granted the honor of executing the last Borg Queen by Seven of Nine, who is the President of the Confederation and married to the Magistrate. The group reunite and learn from the Borg Queen that they can prevent the Confederation's formation by travelling to Los Angeles in 2024, which they can only do with the Queen's help. Agnes, Raffi, and Elnor take control of communication and transporter systems in Confederation headquarters while Seven and Picard buy time at the public execution. As the crowd and the Magistrate grow concerned with their stalling, the others complete their objectives and Picard, Seven, Agnes, Raffi, Elnor, and the Queen are beamed to Rios's ship. They are preparing to initiate time travel when the Magistrate and security officers beam aboard, shoot and wound Elnor, and prepare to execute them all for treason.
13	3	"Assimilation"	Lea Thompson	Kiley Rossetter & Christopher Monfette	March 17, 2022
Seven distracts the Magistrate long enough for the group to overpower and kill him and his officers. The ship comes under attack, and the Queen takes advantage of the situation to directly connect herself to the ship's computers. She destroys their pursuers and slingshots the ship around the sun, creating a wormhole to 2024. She tells Picard that they must find "The Watcher" in Los Angeles who knows what Q changed to cause the new timeline. The ship crashes near Chateau Picard in France, and the Queen diverts all power to sustain herself. Elnor dies of his wounds, and Raffi angrily blames Picard before departing with Seven and Rios to start searching for the Watcher. Rios's transporter malfunctions and he is knocked out, waking up in a clinic that secretly treats undocumented immigrants. Before he can leave, immigration officers raid the clinic and arrest both Rios and his physician, Teresa. Rios's communicator is left behind. Despite Picard's warnings, Agnes connects her mind to the Queen and learns the exact location of the Watcher before she can be assimilated, impressing the Queen.
14	4	"Watcher"	Lea Thompson	Teleplay by : Juliana James & Jane Maggs; Story by : Travis Fickett & Juliana James	March 24, 2022
Picard and Agnes learn from Agnes's connection to the Queen that the change to the timeline they must prevent, to avoid the dark future of the Confederation, will happen in three days time on April 15, 2024. Picard transports to the location Agnes learned from the Queen, and finds a younger version of Guinan who does not know him and is planning to leave Earth after growing disillusioned with humanity. Seven and Raffi search for Rios, who is processed by ICE and sent to a sanctuary district on the U.S. border. They are able to track the bus that Rios is on with the help of Agnes, who tricks the Queen into improving La Sirena's transporter systems. After Picard reveals his name and explains that he is looking for a watcher, Guinan leads him to someone who is also known as a "Supervisor" that is acting as a "guardian angel" for someone on Earth. The Supervisor, who resembles Laris but appears human, teleports away with Picard. Meanwhile, Q approaches a woman who is working on the planned Europa spaceflight mission. He is surprised to discover that he is unable to change her destiny.
15	5	"Fly Me to the Moon"	Jonathan Frakes	Cindy Appel	March 31, 2022
The Supervisor introduces herself as Tallinn and explains to Picard that she is tasked with protecting his ancestor Renée Picard, the woman whom Q had targeted earlier, because Renée plays an important role in the future. Q approaches Dr. Adam Soong, a disgraced geneticist who is desperate to find a cure for his daughter Kore's terminal genetic illness. In exchange for a vial of medicine that can save Kore's life, Q requests Soong's help dealing with Renée. Seven and Raffi break Rios out of ICE custody. Back on La Sirena, the Queen taps into the ship's communications to broadcast an emergency call and lure a policeman onto the ship. Agnes shoots the Queen to prevent her from assimilating the policeman, but the dying Queen injects Agnes with Borg nanoprobes. Picard knows that Renée is destined to find a sentient organism on Jupiter's moon Io and it is essential that she does not back out of the Europa mission. To monitor her at a pre-flight gala, Agnes infiltrates the event to hack the system so they can all attend, but the Borg Queen's consciousness is lurking within her mind.
16	6	"Two of One"	Jonathan Frakes	Cindy Appel & Jane Maggs	April 7, 2022
With the Queen's help, Agnes gives Picard, Tallinn, and Rios access to the gala. There Picard is confronted by Soong, who alerts security that Picard is dangerous. Agnes and the Queen cut the lights and create a distraction by singing a jazz cover of "Shadows of the Night". The resulting rush of endorphins allows the Queen to take full control of Agnes's body. Q, having taken the role of Renée's therapist, stokes her insecurity with text messages, and she begins to flee the party. Picard finds her and persuades her to go through with the mission by talking about his mother, who also loved the stars and also had mental health struggles. Soong sees Renée and Picard walking together outside and attempts to run over Renée with his car. Picard pushes her out of the way but is hit by the car and knocked unconscious. After returning home, Soong deliriously rants at Kore; she investigates his research and learns that she is the only one to have survived of many apparent clones he created. At Teresa's clinic, Tallinn decides to enter Picard's mind to help him wake up from a memory that his mind is fixated on.
17	7	"Monsters"	Joe Menendez	Jane Maggs	April 14, 2022
Inside his mind, Picard relives part of a memory from his childhood where his apparently abusive father Maurice chased Picard's younger self and his mother Yvette through the house. Tallinn helps Picard realize that his mother was actually struggling with mental illness and Maurice was just trying to protect her and Picard. Picard wakes up from his coma and Tallinn reveals that she is actually Romulan and possibly Laris's ancestor. Picard theorizes that Q may have a personal stake in his "trial" and asks Guinan to summon Q using an El-Aurian ritual; the ritual fails just as FBI agent Martin Wells enters the bar and arrests them based on surveillance footage of Picard using his transporter. Rios secretly brings Teresa and her son onto La Sirena, confessing that he is a time-traveler. Raffi and Seven discover that the ship's computers have been sabotaged with Borg encryption codes and begin tracking Agnes. They find a bar where she smashed a window and realize that the Queen is trying to create more endorphins in Agnes until she has enough power to assimilate more people and become a new Borg Queen.
18	8	"Mercy"	Joe Menendez	Cindy Appel & Kirsten Beyer	April 21, 2022
Wells tries to make Picard and Guinan confess to being aliens. He separates them, and Guinan is visited by Q who explains that he is dying and that the "trial" is a final attempt to give his own life meaning. He notes that all humans are stuck in the past, and Guinan uses astral projection to share this message with Picard. Wells reveals that he encountered aliens when he was a child and thought they wanted to kill him, but Picard explains that these were Vulcans who only tried to erase his memories. Wells is forced to release Picard and Guinan after the FBI dismisses him for conducting an illegal investigation. Meanwhile, Raffi and Seven find the Queen collecting car and phone batteries to modify Jurati's body and make it capable of assimilation. She attacks them, but Agnes is able to force her to stop and leave. After learning about her true nature, Kore leaves her father with help from Q. The Queen persuades Soong that he can save his legacy by helping her steal La Sirena, thereby enabling her to conquer the galaxy. Soong provides her with a squad of mercenaries to convert into Borg drones.
19	9	"Hide and Seek"	Michael Weaver	Matt Okumura & Chris Derrick	April 28, 2022
The Queen, Soong, and the drones beam to La Sirena while Picard, Tallinn, Raffi, and Seven beam to Chateau Picard. Agnes's consciousness blocks the Queen from the ship's systems until Seven and Raffi arrive. They try to use the ship against the Queen, but she mortally wounds Seven. After they send Rios, Teresa, and her son to safety, Picard and Tallinn escape from Soong and the drones in the tunnels beneath the chateau. Picard recalls his mother having a mental breakdown while they were playing hide-and-seek in the tunnels when he was a boy, after which she ended her own life. Discussing this with Tallinn helps Picard come to terms with it. Soong corners them, but Rios beams back and forces him to flee. Agnes persuades the Queen to change her ways and build a new Borg collective through cooperation rather than assimilation, truly becoming a new Borg Queen. The new Queen heals Seven by adding her to the collective, and then departs in La Sirena for the Delta Quadrant, leaving a message for Picard: there must be two versions of Renée, one who will fly the Europa mission and one who will die.
20	10	"Farewell"	Michael Weaver	Christopher Monfette & Akiva Goldsman	May 5, 2022
Despite Picard's protests, Tallinn interprets the Queen's message as her needing to sacrifice herself to save Renée. She uses a holographic disguise to thwart Soong's attempted murder of Renée, and dies in Picard's arms while Renée departs on the Europa mission. After his failure, Soong returns home to find that Kore has deleted his digital files, though he still has a physical file labeled "Project Khan". Kore is recruited to join the Travelers by Wesley Crusher, and Rios decides to stay in the past with Teresa. Q and Picard discuss the purpose of the trial: Q hopes that Picard has learned to let go of the past and accept love. Q then uses the last of his power to send Picard, Seven, and Raffi back to the Stargazer in their own timeline, where Elnor is alive. Picard recognizes that this Borg Queen is Agnes, whose collective has detected a new trans-warp conduit that they offer to monitor as provisional members of the Federation. After reuniting with the older Guinan and learning about Rios's life in the 21st century, Picard returns to his chateau and asks Laris for a second chance at being together.

== Cast and characters ==
=== Main ===
- Patrick Stewart as Jean-Luc Picard
- Alison Pill as Agnes Jurati and the new Borg Queen
- Jeri Ryan as Seven of Nine
- Michelle Hurd as Raffi Musiker
- Evan Evagora as Elnor
- Orla Brady as Laris and Tallinn
- Isa Briones as Soji Asha and Kore Soong
- Santiago Cabrera as Chris Rios
- Brent Spiner as Adam Soong

=== Recurring ===
- John de Lancie as Q
- Madeline Wise as Yvette Picard
- Annie Wersching as the original Borg Queen
- Sol Rodríguez as Teresa Ramirez
- Ito Aghayere as young Guinan
- Penelope Mitchell as Renée Picard

=== Notable guests ===
- Whoopi Goldberg as Guinan
- April Grace as Sally Whitley
- Kirk Thatcher as the punk on the bus
- James Callis as Maurice Picard
- Jay Karnes as Martin Wells
- Wil Wheaton as Wesley Crusher

== Production ==
=== Development ===
Executive producer Heather Kadin revealed in October 2018 that Star Trek: Picard was intended to be an ongoing series rather than a limited miniseries; the producers knew from the time Patrick Stewart signed on to star in the series that a second season would definitely be made. Stewart reiterated this in February 2019 and added, "We are set up for possibly three years of this show". That September, Stewart said filming for a second season could begin as early as March 2020. Co-creator Alex Kurtzman confirmed a month later that a second season was "already in the works" ahead of the first-season premiere in January 2020.

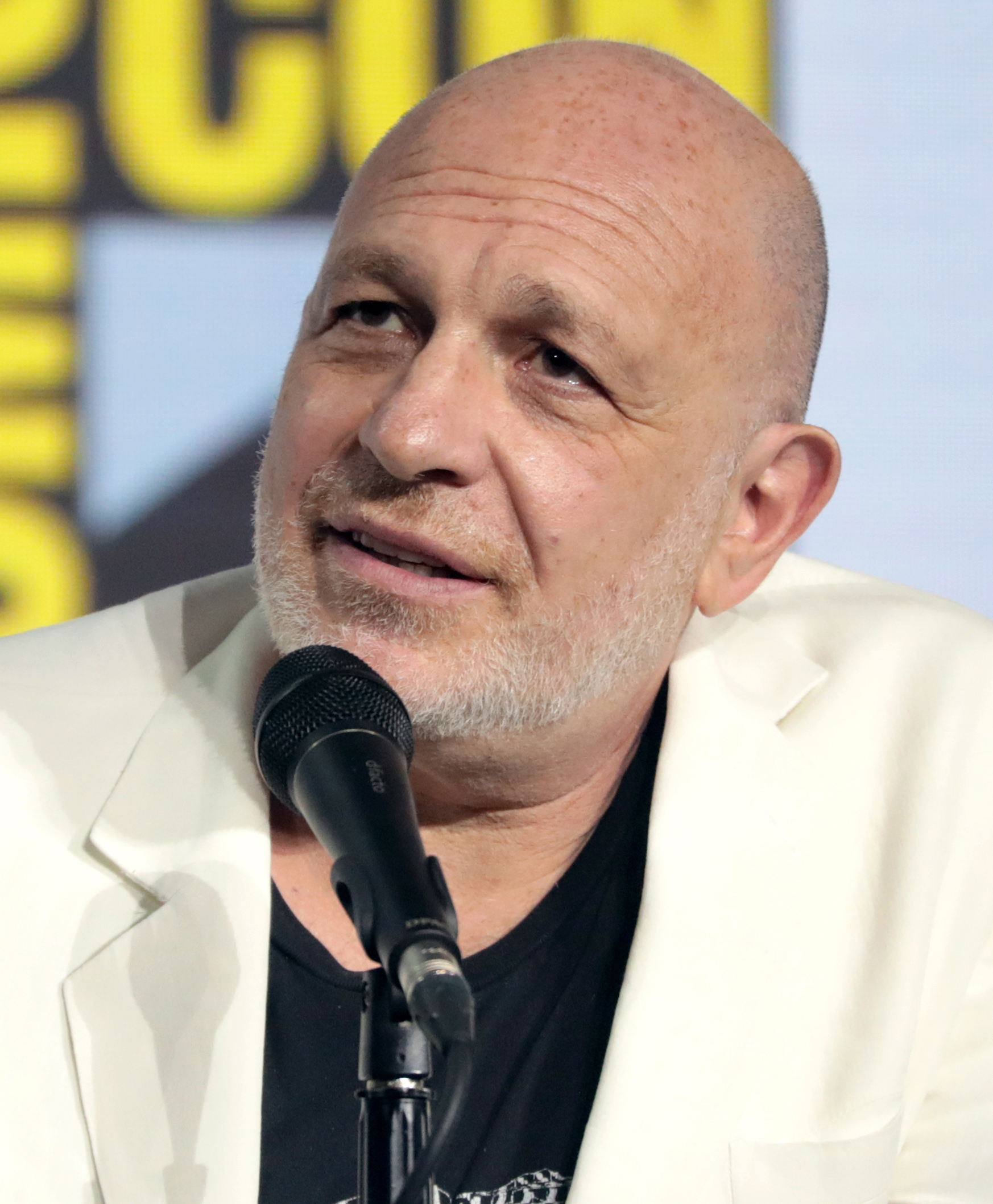
Akiva Goldsman (pictured) served as co-showrunner for the season with Terry Matalas, and continued running the season when Matalas switched focus to the third during production.

In early December, co-creator and showrunner Michael Chabon signed an overall deal with CBS Television Studios to create several new series for them, beginning with an adaptation of his novel The Amazing Adventures of Kavalier & Clay. Chabon was expected to remain with Picard as showrunner until he had to shift focus to Kavalier & Clay at some point in 2020, at which point he would still be creatively involved in Picard as an executive producer. A week later, the series was informally green-lit for a second 10-episode season after being allocated $20.4 million in tax credits by the California Film Commission for the production to continue filming in California. This was the most any television series had been awarded by the program since its expansion in September 2014. An official renewal from streaming service CBS All Access (later rebranded Paramount+) was expected once a showrunner for the second season could be confirmed.

In January 2020, CBS officially announced the second season renewal and revealed that Terry Matalas had joined the series as an executive producer to fill the void that would be created by Chabon's departure. CBS had moved Matalas, who began his career working on Star Trek: Voyager and Star Trek: Enterprise, from MacGyver to Picard because the latter was considered a high priority for the studio. Matalas had been working with Chabon and the second season's writers for "some time" before the official announcement, and he was expected to take over as showrunner once Chabon left the series. Picard was also reported to have an informal green-light for a third season that would be developed at the same time as the second, so the two could be filmed back-to-back. Chabon expressed regret at having to leave the series, but said he was "every bit as involved" in the second season's development as he had been on the first, and he would be writing for the second season as well as remaining an executive producer. The difference, he explained, was that he would not be running the series day-to-day once filming began.

Journalist Marc Bernardin, who began his career working as an intern on Star Trek: Deep Space Nine, joined Picard as a supervising producer in March 2020. By the end of that month, filming was set to begin in mid-June. These plans were made before the COVID-19 pandemic began. Executive producer and co-creator Akiva Goldsman said in May 2020 that if filming could not begin in June due to the pandemic, it would begin as soon as possible after pandemic restrictions were lifted. That September, after a deal was made between major studios and Hollywood unions regarding safety measures for productions during the pandemic, director Jonathan Frakes said filming could begin in January 2021 and added that Stewart was eager to begin as soon as possible; filming began in February. Goldsman and Matalas were revealed to be co-showrunning the season that April, and did so until Matalas switched focus to the third season around half-way through filming the second. Goldsman continued running the second season. Matalas's change in focus happened later than planned because of the pandemic and issues with writing the second season.

=== Writing ===
Following the first-season finale, Chabon and Goldsman said the second season would not ignore the fact that Picard's consciousness was transferred into a synthetic body during that episode. They added that the season would further explore the personal lives of the series' supporting cast, the first season's Romulan refugee storyline, and the technology and culture of Starfleet. Goldsman said the season would continue to explore issues that come up in the last stage of a person's life. One lesson learned by the writers during the first season, according to Goldsman, was to plan out the full story and ending of the season before they began filming.

The writers began by asking questions about Picard's role in the first season, such as "Why is he on a vineyard by himself with a dog? Why did he never marry Beverly Crusher and have a family?" This led to them deconstructing Picard in different ways from the first season, putting an emphasis on his past relationships, romance, and "the puzzle-pieces of his past that are stopping him from embracing his future". After joining the series, Matalas suggested they feature the extra-dimensional being Q from Star Trek: The Next Generation. He felt Q's relationship with Picard was important to the latter, and said Q was "the figure you introduce when your heroes need to face their truest selves". He wanted to tell a dramatic story with Q rather than just use him for "Loki-esque shenanigans" as with the character's previous appearances. Matalas, who is known for the time travel series 12 Monkeys, also suggested the season's time travel plot. This was inspired by the film Star Trek IV: The Voyage Home (1986), and was a way to save money after the expensive first season. He said "all good time-travel tales are emotional at their core, and speak to something that's happening with your main character", and the season explores Picard's trauma from his mother's death by suicide when he was a child. Stewart brought his own experience of childhood domestic violence and subsequent trauma to this storyline. Matalas praised Goldsman for developing these ideas into a "really fascinating and heartbreaking psychological exploration of Picard".

The second and third seasons tell separate stories, despite being developed together. Before the end of 2019, Chabon and Goldsman met with Stewart to pitch the season's story, and Kurtzman said in January 2020 that the writers were confident in it. Kurtzman did want the option to adjust the story based on responses to the first season, but Chabon said the second season would not be affected by fans who criticized the first for not meeting their expectations. The full story for the second season was broken by March 2020 and writing had begun. The story features Q sending Picard and his companions to an alternate timeline where humanity has formed the xenophobic "Confederation of Earth" instead of the United Federation of Planets. They have to travel back in time to the 21st century to prevent that dark future from happening. Production delays caused by the pandemic allowed more episodes to be written upfront than usual, which meant earlier episodes could subsequently be revised based on later ones. After nine episodes had been written, Paramount+ asked for rewrites to remove some of the heavier science fiction ideas that they felt were too "in-Star Trek". This included subplots featuring the Romulans and a secret area of Guinan's bar for different alien species who are in hiding on Earth, the latter taking inspiration from Rick's Café Américain nightclub in the film Casablanca (1942). Another change made during rewrites was to condense two episodes that Chabon wrote, exploring the dark alternate timeline, into one.

The season introduces a new Borg collective that Matalas acknowledged caused some confusion for audiences. He said the new collective is separate from the Borg seen in previous Star Trek media and had not retconned prior Borg storylines. Exposition-heavy scenes were written for the second and third seasons that would have clarified this, but they were not filmed because the producers felt they would be uninteresting to audiences. The anomaly that the new collective discovers was added late in production to give the finale some action. There were suggestions that this could be expanded on in the third season, but the third-season scripts were too far along at that point for it to be added. Writing for the second season was completed after filming began in early 2021. Goldsman said it would not be clear if they had been successful in crafting the full story until editing was done.

=== Casting ===
By June 2020, most of the main cast from the first season were expected to star in the second, including Patrick Stewart as Jean-Luc Picard, Alison Pill as Agnes Jurati, Isa Briones as Soji Asha, Evan Evagora as Elnor, Michelle Hurd as Raffi Musiker, and Santiago Cabrera as Cristobal "Chris" Rios. Harry Treadaway, who portrayed Narek in the first season, did not return for the second.

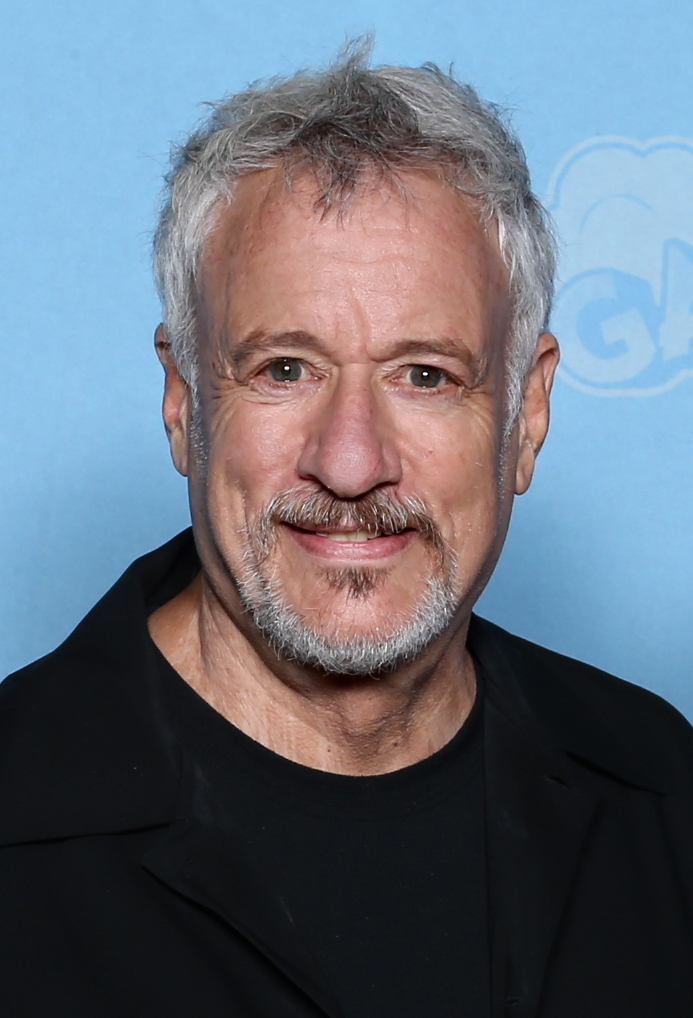
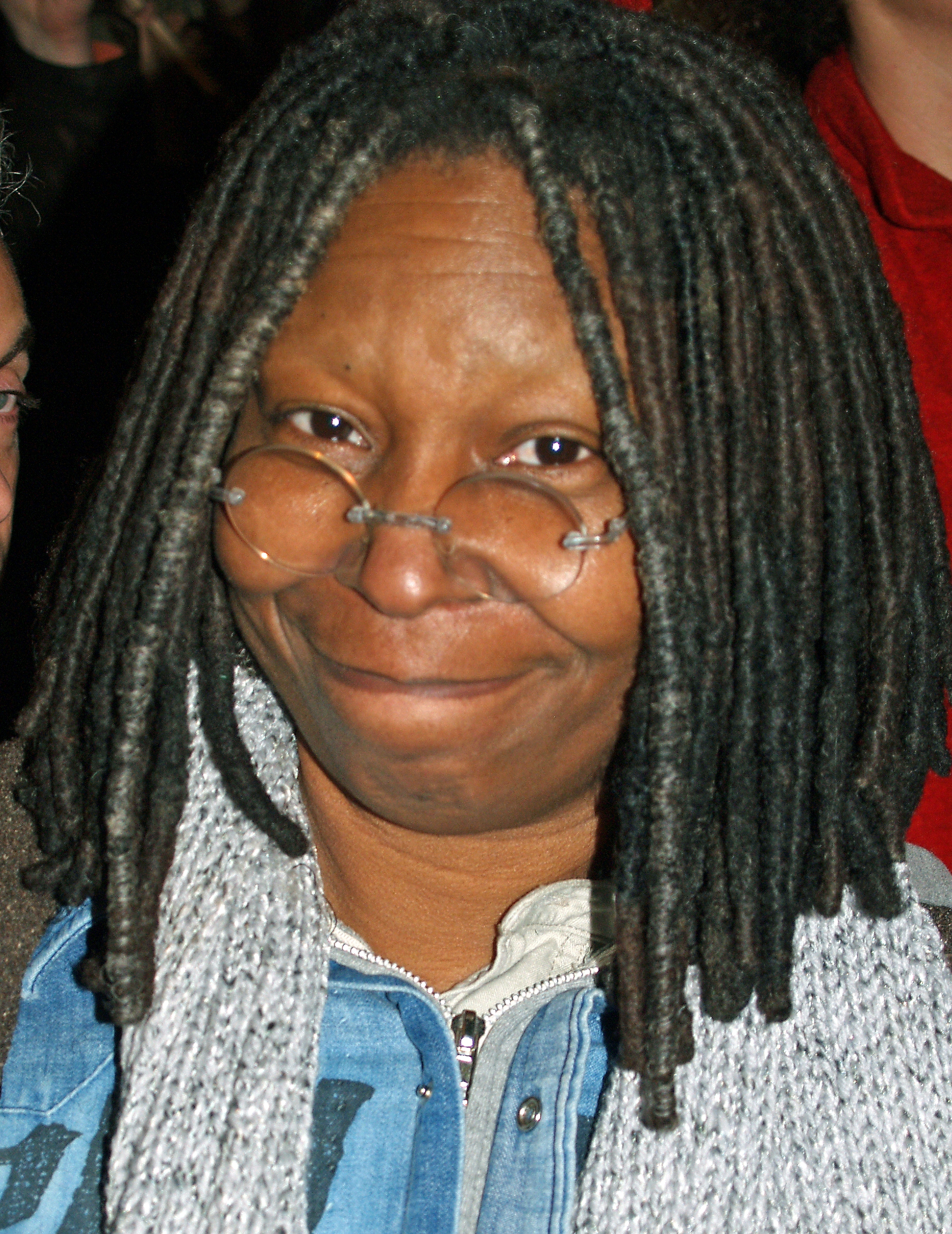
John de Lancie (left) and Whoopi Goldberg (right) reprise their respective roles of Q and Guinan from Star Trek: The Next Generation in the season.

In February 2019, Whoopi Goldberg stated that she would like to reprise her Star Trek: The Next Generation role of Guinan in Picard. That July, Robert Picardo, who portrayed the holographic doctor in Star Trek: Voyager, said CBS had expressed interest in him returning for the second season of Picard. In January 2020, while promoting the first season of the series on the talk show The View, Stewart officially invited co-host Goldberg to appear in the second season, an invitation which Goldberg accepted. By April, LeVar Burton had discussed reprising his Next Generation role of Geordi La Forge on Picard, and said there was a possibility he would appear in the second season, while Gates McFadden said in June that there was a "good chance" she would be reprising her Next Generation role of Beverly Crusher in the season. In July, Picardo praised the series and expressed interest in guest-starring in it in the future, but said there were "absolutely no plans" for him to appear in the second season. In May 2021, McFadden said "things have changed a lot on different levels" and she would no longer be appearing in the second season, expressing her disappointment at this, though in April 2022 she was revealed to be reprising her role in the third season of Picard instead, alongside Burton and other members of the Next Generation cast.

After reprising his Next Generation role of Data in the first season, Brent Spiner said in March 2020 that he would not do so again as he felt that story was a fitting end to the character. He expressed interest in returning as Dr. Altan Inigo Soong, who he began playing in the first season two-part finale, and Goldsman later admitted that Altan Soong was created in part so Spiner could return following Data's death. Chabon expressed interest in first-season recurring guest stars Jeri Ryan, Orla Brady, and Jamie McShane returning for the second season, respectively as Voyager's Seven of Nine and Picard's Romulan staff-members Laris and Zhaban. He said a relationship between Seven and Raffi that was teased at the end of the first season would be explored in the second. Ryan confirmed in May 2020 that she was returning for the second season, and she, Brady, and Spiner were revealed to be main cast members in April 2021. Zhaban is revealed to have died since the end of the first season, and Laris becomes a love interest for Picard in the second. Brady also plays Tallinn, an ancestor of Laris's who is a Supervisor like the Star Trek: The Original Series character Gary Seven. Spiner's contract stipulated that he not portray Data again, and he instead plays a new Soong ancestor in 2024 named Adam. Briones portrays his daughter, Kore, which helps to explain who Data based the appearance of Briones's Soji on in the first season—Soji is a synthetic being that Data created to be his daughter.

Also in April 2021, John de Lancie was announced to be reprising his role as Q from The Next Generation in the season. To explain why Q appears much older in this season than he did in The Next Generation, the character initially appears the same as he did in that series—with de Lancie being digitally de-aged—before choosing to age himself to match the older Picard. In September, Annie Wersching was revealed to be cast in the recurring role of the Borg Queen, taking over from Alice Krige who portrayed the character in the film Star Trek: First Contact (1996) and the Voyager series finale. Susanna Thompson also portrayed the character in several episodes of Voyager. Wersching's first television role was as a guest star on Star Trek: Enterprise, and Goldsman considered bringing this "full circle" by having this version of the Borg Queen be the same character, but this idea did not make it to the screen. Later in the season, the Borg Queen enters the mind of Agnes Jurati and becomes a new Queen that Alison Pill portrays. Matalas revealed in January 2024 that Emily Hampshire, who starred in 12 Monkeys, was almost cast as the Borg Queen but scheduling issues prevented this. The season introduces a younger version of Guinan in 2024 who does not yet know Picard. The original version of Guinan first met Picard in 1893 during the events of the Next Generation time travel episode "Time's Arrow", but Matalas explained that these events do not happen during this season's altered timeline because the Federation does not exist. A long-time Next Generation fan, guest star Ito Aghayere revisited Goldberg's episodes and studied her mannerisms. She intended for her version to start as more aggressive and grow into Goldberg's calmer performance.

With the season delving further into Picard's family, his mother Yvette appears several times via flashbacks portrayed by Madeline Wise. The character was portrayed as an old woman by Herta Ware in the Next Generation episode "Where No One Has Gone Before", but the flashbacks in this season show her to have struggled with mental health issues and died by suicide when Picard was a child. To explain Ware's appearance as an older version of the character, Picard says he has been suppressing the memory of his mother's death and has had visions of her getting to live a long life. James Callis, who had a recurring role in 12 Monkeys, appears as Picard's father Maurice. The character was portrayed by Clive Church in The Next Generation. A new member of the family, Renée Picard, plays a key role in the season's 2024 events, portrayed by Penelope Mitchell.

Wil Wheaton reprised his Next Generation role of Wesley Crusher for an appearance in the season finale, which he kept secret for around a year until the episode was released. Wheaton was excited to return and praised the writers for honoring the headcanon that he developed for the character after The Next Generation, in which Crusher serves as one of the Travelers and is "effectively Star Trek's version of a Time Lord" from Doctor Who. The producers also wanted Robert Beltran to reprise his role as Chakotay from Voyager. The character would have been the Confederation Magistrate and husband to Seven of Nine in the alternate timeline, making him the main villain of that episode. Beltran did not like the direction this took Chakotay so turned down the offer to reprise his role, leading to rewrites. The unnamed Confederation Magistrate was instead portrayed by Jon Jon Briones, the father of Isa Briones. When serving as an associate producer on Star Trek IV: The Voyage Home, Kirk Thatcher briefly appeared in the film as the "Punk on the Bus". He reprised this role for another brief appearance in the second season of Picard, which was one of the first things that Matalas pitched for the season as a way to reference the film and acknowledge its influence on the season's story. Thatcher was excited to return to the role, which he said was what he was best known for, and he had suggestions for the character's appearance including a similar red mohawk as he had in the film. April Grace, who previously portrayed Maggie Hubbell in episodes of The Next Generation and Deep Space Nine, portrays Admiral Sally Whitley in the season premiere. Jay Karnes plays FBI agent Martin Wells after previously portraying the time travelling Starfleet officer Ducane in Voyager.

Sol Rodríguez has a recurring role in the season as Teresa Ramirez, a doctor who treats those without identification or money and helps Rios. Additionally, Patton Oswalt provided the voice of a virtual cat named Spot 73; Brian "Q" Quinn makes a cameo appearance as Dale, a character that he also appeared as in Matalas's previous series 12 Monkeys and MacGyver; director Lea Thompson appears as Dr. Diane Werner, the chairman of a committee who remove Adam Soong's license to research and funding; and Stewart's wife Sunny Ozell has a cameo appearance singing in a bar that Jurati goes to.

=== Design ===
Matalas said each season would be differentiated visually. He wanted to return to the visual style of the Next Generation era while incorporating elements from the Original Series-era films, which were his personal favorites. He said new production designer Dave Blass was a long-time Star Trek fan who also wanted to return to that aesthetic, and they both insisted on bringing back several creatives from earlier Star Trek series including Michael and Denise Okuda, who designed the LCARS computer system for The Next Generation; long-time Star Trek concept designer and visual effects artists Doug Drexler; and frequent Star Trek starship designer John Eaves. The design team included a lot of references to previous Star Trek projects, which Matalas said was partially "cheeky, nerdy fun", but also about honoring the history and legacy of the franchise. The series' opening title sequence was updated from the first season by creative agency Prologue to include new imagery from the second season, including adding a Starfleet combadge to Picard's jacket for the ending shot.

The Starfleet uniform designs from the first season were merged with those from the Original Series-era films; one of Leonard Nimoy's Spock costumes from Star Trek II: The Wrath of Khan (1982) was used as reference. The new designs have a jacket-like opening and remove the "militaristic collar" from the first season's uniforms. They are black with different colors across the chest and shoulders to represent each division. Picard's Starfleet Academy assignment badge was inspired by the badge worn by William Shatner's Admiral James T. Kirk in The Wrath of Khan. The Borg Queen was intended to be a new character with access to the same information as the previous Queens, and Matalas wanted a new design that honered the previous Borg Queen designs while "bringing it into the 4K streaming world". Creature designer Neville Page created the new design which was translated into prosthetics by Glenn Hetrick and Alchemy Studio. Head of prosthetics James Mackinnon applied the prosthetics to Wersching, which initially took four hours but was down to two-and-a-half hours by the end of production. The prosthetics consisted of a crown piece that Page sculpted digitally, based on scans of Wersching's head, which was 3D printed and had built-in lighting. 10 other silicon pieces were used to cover Wersching's face, neck, and shoulders, featuring built-in magnets where the Queen needed to be connected to her containment vessel. Page wanted to match the original Borg Queen silhouette of just a head and neck, but ultimately gave the character shoulders and arms due to logistical concerns. He approached the character as an evolution of the prosthetics that were already used for Seven of Nine, who has Borg implants.

Concept art of the USS Stargazer (NCC-82893) by John Eaves. The starship was designed by Eaves, Doug Drexler, and Dave Blass based on the original Stargazer (NCC-2893) from Star Trek: The Next Generation. Making it distinct among Star Trek starships are its four nacelles.

The design team wanted to expand Chateau Picard beyond the main study set from the first season, introducing a library and a solarium. Art director Joe Comeau described the chateau as a "reflection of the psyche" of Picard. It is seen in three different time periods in the season: 2401 at the beginning of the season, abandoned in 2024 for much of the season, and in flashbacks to 2315 when young Picard and his family first move in. Matalas and the designers wanted to bridge the look of the chateau from the first season with its depiction in the Next Generation episode "Family". Establishing shots of the chateau in 2024 include two wings of the building that are not seen in the first season or the second season's 2401 scenes. These match the parts of the building seen in "Family", suggesting that they burned down during the fire that is mentioned in the film Star Trek Generations (1994). Evidence of fire damage was included in the 2401 solarium design, and the 2315 sets were meant to align with the style of "Family"'s sets rather than the "tuscan look" of the first season and the second season's 2401 sets. The designers intended to have major damage, like a "busted ceiling", in the 2024 sets but this was cut back in favor of general aging and set dressing.

The season introduces a new starship, the USS Stargazer (NCC-82893). Designed by Eaves, Drexler, and Blass, it was based on an earlier USS Stargazer (NCC-2893), the first starship that Picard captained which was introduced in the Next Generation episode "The Battle". The new ship retains the original Stargazer's unique design of having four nacelles. Goldsman said they wanted to revisit the Stargazer, which Picard has a deep emotional connection to, as part of the season's theme of looking back at the past. Blass explained that the registry for the new version was not "NCC-2893-A", following the pattern used for the USS Enterprise of denoting the version with a letter, because the Stargazer "does not hold the status in the Federation that the Enterprise had... the Stargazer didn't have that legacy". The set for the Stargazer's bridge is 10 feet (3.0 m) wider than the bridge set for the USS Enterprise-E in the Next Generation-era films to allow for multiple widescreen cameras to film inside the set at once, though it is not as wide as the bridge set of the USS Discovery from Star Trek: Discovery.

=== Filming ===
Filming was scheduled to begin in mid-June 2020, but was delayed to January 2021 by the COVID-19 pandemic. In December 2020, Ryan said filming would begin on February 1, but on that date she revealed that it was delayed again. Principal photography began on February 16, in California where the series received tax incentives to continue filming after the first season. Doug Aarniokoski directed the first two episodes, and Crescenzo Notarile returned as cinematographer from the third season of Discovery. Jimmy Lindsey was also a cinematographer for the season. Location filming took place later in February at the Walt Disney Concert Hall in Los Angeles, to portray Starfleet Academy in the first episode and the Confederation Presidential Palace in the second. SoFi Stadium in Inglewood was also used to depict part of Starfleet Academy in the premiere. In April, de Lancie said scenes for the second and third seasons of Picard were being filmed simultaneously. The two seasons had one of the largest television crews at the time with more than 450 crewmembers.

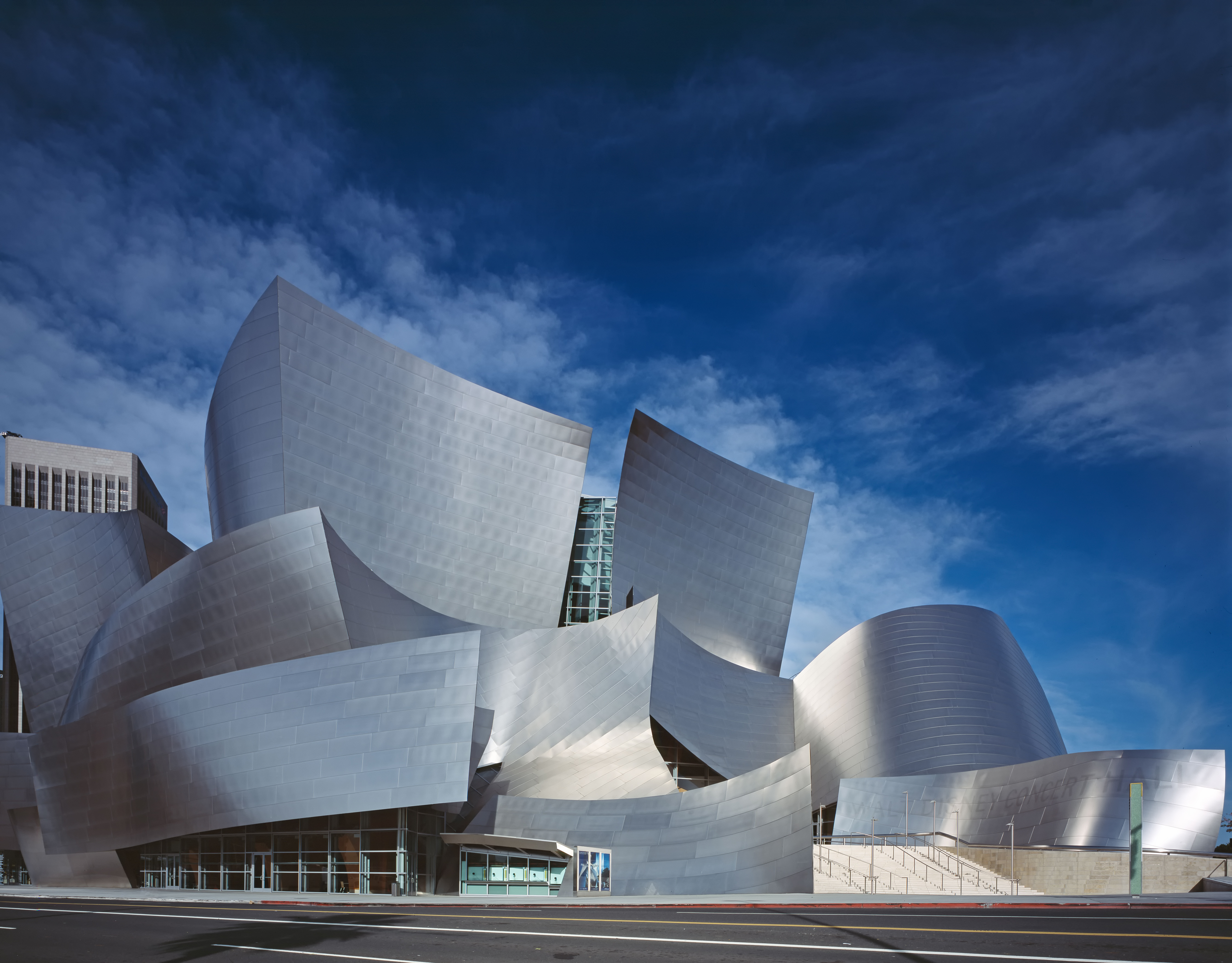
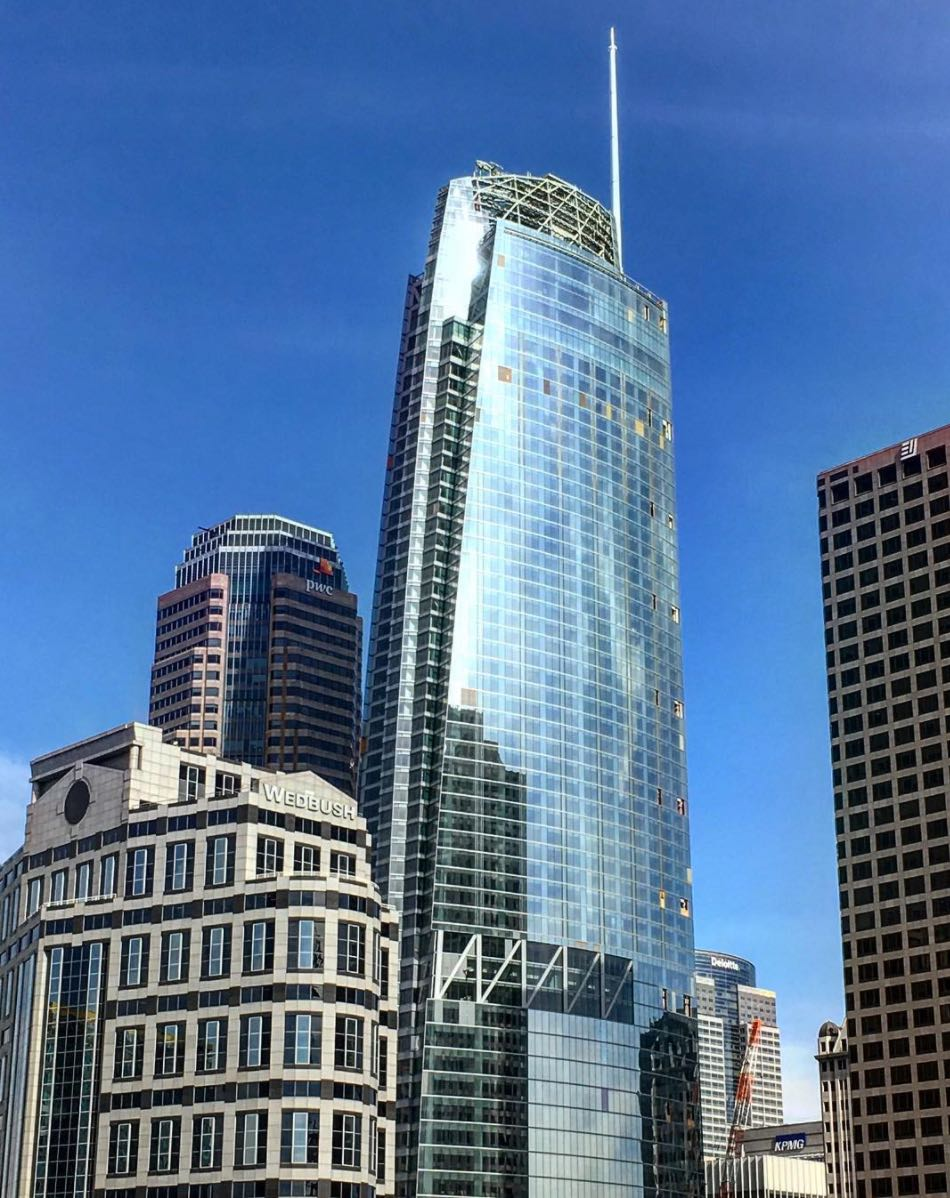
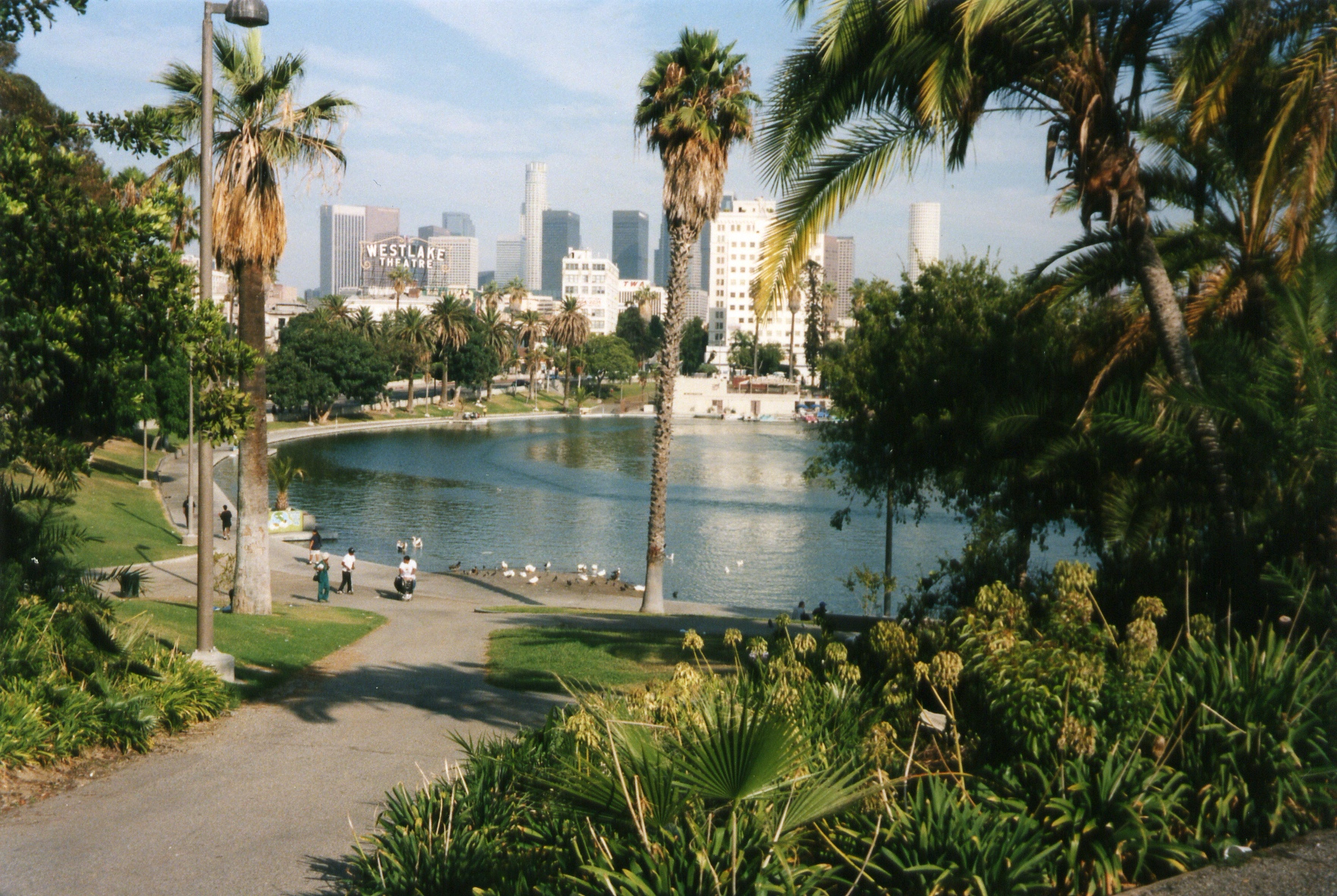
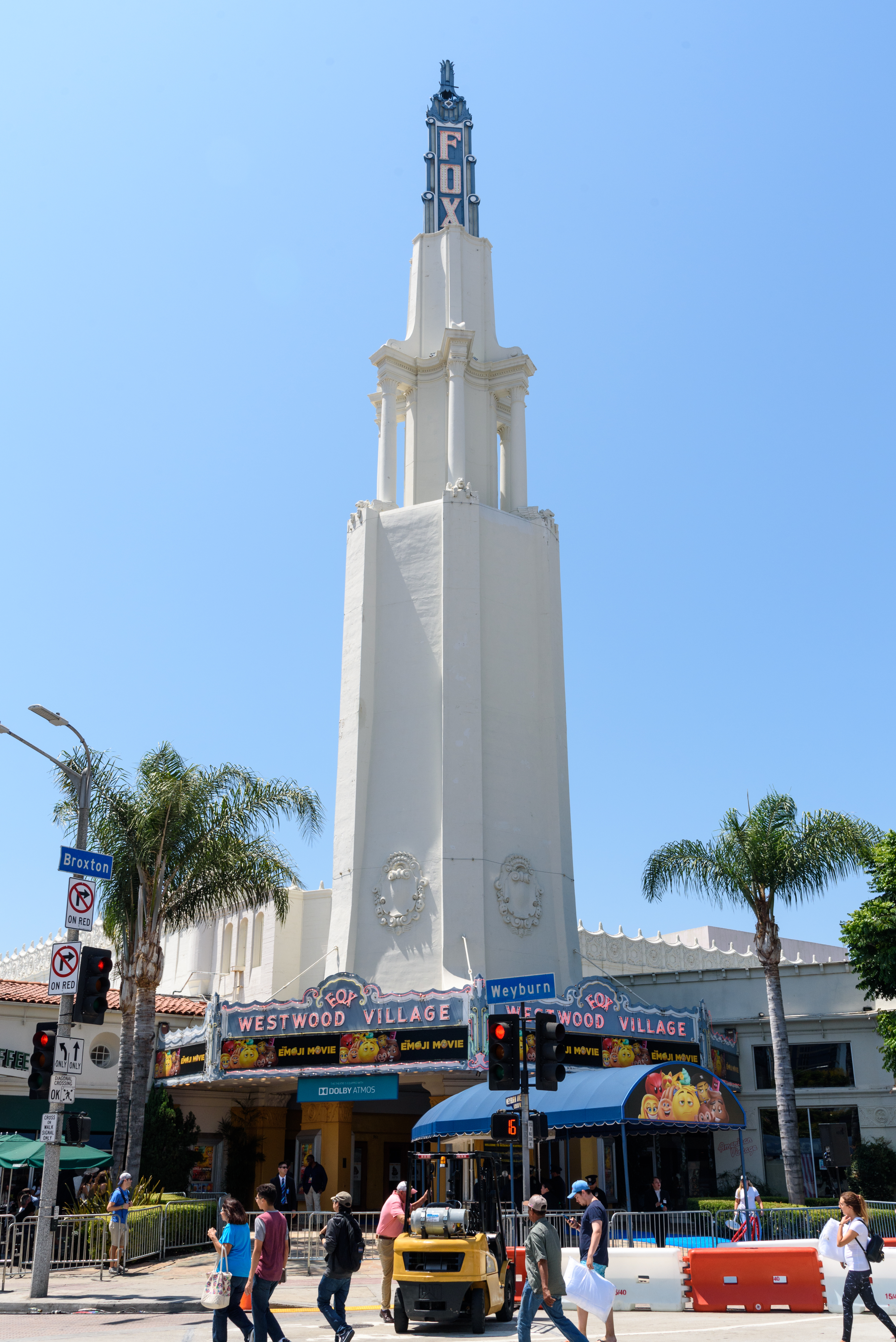
The series received tax incentives to film in California. Location filming for the second season took place around Los Angeles, including at the Walt Disney Concert Hall, Wilshire Grand Center, MacArthur Park, and Fox Village Theater.

Lea Thompson directed the third and fourth episodes, including the sequence where the main cast travel back in time to 2024. This was not initially in the third episode's script when Thompson joined the series, but it was moved from the second episode to the third following rewrites. Thompson noted that she has experience working with time travel stories after starring in the Back to the Future film trilogy, and also acknowledged that there were existing time travel sequences in Star Trek that they wanted to be consistent with. The crew still wanted to put their "own spin on what it would look like going back in time", and specific visuals that Thompson added to the sequence include falling sparks that suddenly rise back off the ground, a tear on Jurati's cheek moving in reverse, and footage captured by moving a camera dolly forward while zooming out which was a technique popularized by Alfred Hitchcock. Thompson spent a lot of time discussing how to light the set of La Sirena with Notarile due to its large size and the complex lighting needed for the time travel sequence, including flashing lights, sparks, strobes, and a representation of the ship flying close to the sun. They also had to light the set with the Borg Queen's "signature green hue" for the scene where Picard and Jurati attempt to extract information from the Borg Queen. The Markridge Industrial Tower that Raffi and Seven visit in the third episode was filmed at the Wilshire Grand Center, the tallest building in Los Angeles. The name "Markridge" is a reference to 12 Monkeys. While at the tower, Raffi detects an alien signal coming from MacArthur Park, which is where Picard's meeting with Tallinn in the fourth episode was filmed.

Frequent Star Trek director Jonathan Frakes helmed the fifth and sixth episodes. Filming for them began by the end of June 2021. Frakes discussed the change in tone between the first and second seasons with Matalas and Goldsman, but not any changes to his own directing style. He noted that there were several parallels between the episodes and the film Star Trek: First Contact, which he directed, and he worked with Lindsey to replicate some of the techniques that cinematographer Matthew F. Leonetti used on the film. Frakes also acknowledged the similar approach in portraying 2024 to the Deep Space Nine two-part episode "Past Tense", which he directed half of. Frakes explained that both depictions had "a lot to do with immigration and the mistreatment of brown people... being set in 2024 serves as a cautionary tale to all of us." He felt this element of the season helped make it feel like Star Trek despite the contemporary setting. Frakes was excited to be working with Stewart, Spiner, and de Lancie again after he starred with them on Next Generation, particularly highlighting the scene where Soong and Q meet in a diner. He praised Spiner and de Lancie as having "gotten better with age. There is a real confidence in the way they embrace their characters." For the scene where Q pretends to be Renée Picard's therapist, Frakes and de Lancie decided on set that the latter should use a Sigmund Freud-inspired Austrian accent. Frakes acknowledged that this was "a little on the nose" and something that Matalas and Goldsman had questioned, but they felt it was fun for the scene. The interior of the gala in these episodes was primarily filmed at the Millennium Biltmore Hotel in Downtown Los Angeles. Exteriors for the gala were filmed at the Fox Theater in Westwood Village.

Joe Menendez directed the seventh and eighth episodes, after previously working with Matalas on 12 Monkeys. Michael Weaver directed the ninth and tenth episodes. The use of smoke on set during the filming of the last two episodes affected Stewart's vocal cords, making his voice more hoarse than usual. The producers planned to re-record his dialogue for the episodes, but Stewart encouraged them not to do that because "the weakness in [his] voice was reflecting the weakness in the character". Filming for the season ended on September 2, 2021, and the production segued fully into filming the third season.

=== Visual effects ===
Visual effects vendors for the season included Crafty Apes VFX, Outpost VFX, and Gradient Effects. Outpost was initially just hired to work on the La Sirena crash and Chateau Picard location in the third episode, but their work was expanded to include four other episodes in the season when the producers liked the results. Shots featuring Chateau Picard used aerial footage of the chateau filming location which needed to be augmented to make it look rundown for the 2024 scenes and "pristine" for the 25th century scenes. The La Sirena crash required fire and spark effects on the ship as well as simulations of its impact on the chateau grounds.

For the fleet of starships that appear in the season premiere, Blass wanted to address fan criticisms regarding the fleet from the first-season finale in which all of the ships looked very similar. Though he knew this was done due to practical limitations in modelling that many different ships, Blass looked for a viable solution for this season and contacted the creators of the Star Trek Online video game about using some of their starship models. He specifically wanted to use the most popular ships from the game, as long as none of them had four nacelles so the Stargazer could stand out beside them. Star Trek Online designer and associate art director Thomas Marrone and his team provided their digital models of existing Next Generation-era ships (including the Akira-class from Star Trek: First Contact), their own original models of potential 25th-century ships, and some new models created specifically for the season. Marrone updated the models with more detail to match the higher quality expected for a television series, and the Picard visual effects team used these models in the final sequence. This meant that fan-favorite starships from the game were now franchise canon (including the Ross-class exploration cruiser and the Reliant-class light cruiser) which Marrone said was a "dream come true".

The user interfaces for the starships were created by visual effects company Twisted Media, based on the LCARS computer system. They referenced the designs from The Next Generation and the films of that era, as well as the Star Trek: The Next Generation Technical Manual (1991) reference guide by Rick Sternbach and Michael Okuda. Okuda consulted on the company's LCARS designs, as did Drexler who also provided digital models that were integrated into the interface screens. The original plan was to mostly add the user interfaces during post-production, but this changed after Todd A. Marks and his video playback company Images on Screen joined the series. They used a combination of LG OLED screens and Screen Innovations' FlexGlass projection screens (paired with rear screen projectors) to display the interfaces on set during filming for the first and last episodes.

=== Music ===
Composer Jeff Russo said in December 2020 that he was beginning to think about the score for the season, which features an "up-tempo rearrangement" of the series' main theme. Russo did this because he wanted "a little more pace and a little more hype" to reflect the swashbuckling, action-heavy tone of the second season compared to the more contemplative first season that he originally wrote the theme for. After referencing Jerry Goldsmith's theme from The Next Generation and Alexander Courage's original Star Trek theme in his initial music for the series, Russo also references Goldsmith's First Contact theme in the second season's score.

In Thatcher's first appearance as the punk on the bus in The Voyage Home, the character listens to a punk rock song titled "I Hate You" that Thatcher wrote and performed with members of the film's crew. For this season, Thatcher wrote and performed a new song for the character to listen to titled "I Still Hate You". The Voyage Home sound editors Mark Mangini and Aaron Glascock returned to record the new song, respectively performing guitar and drums. For Ozell's cameo appearance, she and her band perform the song "Take You Down" from her album Overnight Lows. Menendez chose the song, which Ozell called a "strong, sassy, bluesy powerful anthem".

Russo had begun recording the season's score with an orchestra at the Sony Pictures Scoring Stage by December 2021, and completed recording for the season finale on January 12, 2022. A soundtrack album was released digitally by Lakeshore Records on April 29, 2022, featuring Russo's score along with Alison Pill's version of "Shadows of the Night" from the episode "Two of One". All music by Jeff Russo, except where noted:

Star Trek: Picard – Season 2 (Original Series Soundtrack)
No.	Title	Artist(s)	Length
1.	"Season 2 Main Title"		1:59
2.	"Look Up"		1:21
3.	"Let's See What's Out There"		3:54
4.	"The Pressure of Legacy"		1:12
5.	"Penance"		3:03
6.	"Seek the Watcher"		5:06
7.	"Best Laid Plans"		4:49
8.	"What's My Full Name?"		2:44
9.	"Disappointment in Leadership"		4:24
10.	"Family Secrets"		2:05
11.	"Your Ancestor"		1:07
12.	"A Melancholy"		2:29
13.	"A Taste of Freedom"		3:54
14.	"Maximum Security Function"		1:20
15.	"Lies Upon Lies"		2:22
16.	"The Journey Inward"		3:12
17.	"The True Monster"		3:05
18.	"My Spaceship"		1:30
19.	"Deepest Truth"		2:32
20.	"My Truth"		2:55
21.	"Build Back Better Borg"		4:53
22.	"Opening the Door"		4:06
23.	"Honoring the Deal"		3:41
24.	"The Travelers"		1:36
25.	"Where You Belong"		3:03
26.	"Guardian at the Gate"		3:43
27.	"Second Chances"		3:13
28.	"Fly Me to the Moon"		1:42
29.	"Shadows of the Night"	Alison Pill	1:28
30.	"Season 2 End Credits (201)"		0:54
31.	"Season 2 End Credits (209)"		0:53
Total length:			1:24:00

== Marketing ==
CBS announced in June 2020 that it was participating in the "All In Challenge" to raise money for COVID-19 relief. Money donated to the campaign would go to charities including Feeding America, Meals on Wheels, World Central Kitchen, and No Kid Hungry, and fans who donated could win the chance to visit the series' set, meet Patrick Stewart, and have a walk-on role in an episode. In February 2021, Stewart appeared in a marketing campaign for Super Bowl LV advertising the rebranded streaming service Paramount+. A panel for the season was held during the "First Contact Day" virtual event on April 5, 2021, celebrating the franchise on the fictional holiday marking first contact between humans and aliens in the Star Trek universe. Stewart and de Lancie discussed the season at the panel, which debuted a teaser revealing the focus on time travel and the return of Q. A second teaser was released to coincide with "Capitan Picard Day" on June 16, featuring a look at de Lancie's return and teasing an alternate timeline for the characters. A teaser poster was also released featuring a contemporary-looking Los Angeles. Liz Shannon Miller of Collider highlighted the appearance of Q in the trailer as well as the emphasis on other characters such as Seven of Nine in alternate timeline scenarios. Matthew Jackson at Syfy Wire also highlighted the appearance of Q, saying it gave him goosebumps. James Whitbrook of io9 focused on Seven of Nine appearing without her Borg implants and described the teaser poster as "cryptic".

The "Star Trek Day" virtual event on September 8, celebrating the 55th anniversary of the Star Trek: The Original Series premiere, included a panel for the season where a new trailer was revealed. io9's Germain Lussier felt it answered some questions about the season's plot, which he compared to Back to the Future Part II (1989), but also raised more questions. He noted that the time travelling plot allowed the season to film in modern-day Los Angeles in a similar way to Star Trek IV: The Voyage Home. Joshua Meyer of /Film highlighted the reveal of the Borg Queen as well as the apparent social commentary of the trailer, including where it juxtaposes a "Nuremberg-esque rally" with images of Hong Kong in an apparent reference to the 2019–2020 Hong Kong protests. He saw this as evidence of Picard being the most overt of the current Star Trek series in its attempts at social commentary, bringing it more in-line with past Star Trek series. Meyer also compared the trailer's totalitarian imagery to similar scenes in Star Wars: The Force Awakens (2015). The official trailer and key art for the season were released in January 2022 after the premiere date was revealed. Commentators said the trailer covered many of the same concepts as the previous teasers, including Q and time travel, but it also gave the first look at Goldberg's return in the season which was the highlight for many. Adam Holmes of CinemaBlend, who believed Guinan was the most important recurring character on The Next Generation, said the trailer "finally gives us our first taste" of Goldberg's role after she publicly agreed to return. He speculated on how the season would explain the fact that Goldberg has aged since she last portrayed Guinan despite her scenes seemingly being set in the past.

Coinciding with the season's release, Paramount+ opened the 10 Forward: The Experience pop-up event in Los Angeles on March 10, for 10 days. Each day featured a different local food truck as well as themed cocktails and the "10 Forward Canteen Store" where merchandise could be purchased. The event also featured "experiential environments", "digital interactions", and photo opportunities. Guests were encouraged to dress in cosplay. Paramount+ also brought the 10 Forward: The Experience pop-up event to San Diego from July 21 to 24 for the 2022 San Diego Comic-Con. July 23 featured a surprise event with members of the cast. At the Las Vegas Star Trek convention in August, Star Trek Wines announced the 2401 Chateau Picard wine and a Risian wine based on those seen in "The Star Gazer". The bottles were based on scans of the props from the episode.

== Release ==
=== Streaming and broadcast ===
The season premiered on March 3, 2022, on Paramount+ in the United States, and ran for 10 episodes until May 5. Each episode was broadcast in Canada by Bell Media on the same day as the U.S., on the specialty channels CTV Sci-Fi Channel (English) and Z (French) before streaming on Crave. Amazon Prime Video released each episode within 24 hours of its U.S. debut in over 200 other countries and territories. In February 2023, Paramount made a new deal with Prime Video for the series' international streaming rights. This allowed the season to be added to Paramount+ in some other countries in addition to remaining on Prime Video. In August 2023, Star Trek content was removed from Crave and the season began streaming in Canada on Paramount+ instead. The series would continue to be broadcast on CTV Sci-Fi and be available on CTV.ca and the CTV app.

=== Home media ===
The season was released on DVD, Blu-Ray, and Limited Edition Steelbook formats in the U.S. on October 4, 2022. The release includes all 10 episodes, as well as deleted scenes, a gag reel, and behind-the-scenes featurettes on the creation and design of the USS Stargazer, the making of the Chateau Picard sets, the season's props, Q's storyline with de Lancie, and the season's new prosthetics for the Borg Queen. On September 5, 2023, a box set featuring the complete series and over seven hours of special features was released, while a 54-disc Blu-ray "Picard Legacy Collection" that includes this series was released on November 7.

== Reception ==
=== Viewership ===
Whip Media, who track viewership data for the 19 million worldwide users of their TV Time app, ranked Picard in the top 10 original streaming series for U.S. viewership each week the season was released except for the week of the season premiere. Parrot Analytics determines audience "demand expressions" based on various data sources, and the company calculated that Picard was the third-most in demand U.S. streaming series for March 2022 behind Disney+'s The Mandalorian and Netflix's Stranger Things. This was the first time a Paramount+ series appeared in the company's monthly rankings in nine months, and they said the series was 32 times more in demand than the average U.S. streaming series. It dropped slightly to 31.4 times more in demand for April 2022, though this made it the sixth-most in demand series on Parrot's list after several new series were released. Picard was the ninth-most in demand series for May 2022, according to Parrot, down to 27.4 times more in demand than the average series. This was behind Star Trek: Strange New Worlds, which debuted at fifth place.

=== Critical response ===
Star Trek: Picard season 2: Critical reception by episode
Percentage of positive critics' reviews tracked by the website Rotten Tomatoes

The review aggregator website Rotten Tomatoes reported an 85% approval score with an average rating of 7.95/10 based on 95 reviews. The website's critical consensus reads, "Picard gets some backup from franchise fan favorites in a sophomore season that charts a course towards recapturing more of the classical Star Trek spirit and makes it so." Metacritic, which uses a weighted average, assigned a score of 69 out of 100 based on reviews from 7 critics, indicating "generally favorable" reviews.

IGN gave the season a negative review saying, it "might just be the worst season of Star Trek ever produced." The review also stated that although the season "started off in a good place, looking to amend some of the missteps of the show's freshman year ... in attempting to embrace and celebrate the things that fans love about Star Trek, the show fell into the trap of regurgitating old concepts."

In March 2024, Matalas acknowledged some of the concerns that audiences had with the season, saying "I think you can kind of feel when you watch season two that there's a lot of different ideas here". He attributed this to the rewrites that the studio requested as well as complications from making the second and third seasons at the same time.

=== Accolades ===
Year	Award	Category	Nominee(s)	Result	Ref.
2022	Black Reel Awards	Outstanding Guest Actress, Drama Series	Whoopi Goldberg	Nominated	
2022	Imagen Awards	Best Supporting Actor – Drama (Television)	Santiago Cabrera	Nominated	
2022	Primetime Creative Arts Emmy Awards	Outstanding Fantasy/Sci-Fi Costumes	Christine Bieselin Clark, Michell Ray Kenney, and Allison Agler (for "Penance")	Nominated	
2022	Primetime Creative Arts Emmy Awards	Outstanding Period And/Or Character Makeup (Non-Prosthetic)	Silvina Knight, Tanya Cookingham, Peter De Oliveira, Allyson Carey, and Hanny Eisen (for "Hide and Seek")	Nominated	
2022	Primetime Creative Arts Emmy Awards	Outstanding Prosthetic Makeup	James Mackinnon, Vincent Van Dyke, Kevin Kirkpatrick, Hugo Villasenor, Bianca Appice, Neville Page, Toryn Reed, and Ralis Kahn (for "Hide and Seek")	Nominated	
2022	Primetime Creative Arts Emmy Awards	Outstanding Sound Editing for a Comedy or Drama Series (One Hour)	Matthew E. Taylor, Michael Schapiro, Sean Hessinger, Alex Pugh, Clay Weber, John Sanacore, Ben Schorr, Katherine Harper, and Ginger Geary (for "Penance")	Nominated	
2022	Set Decorators Society of America Awards	Best Achievement in Décor/Design of a One Hour Fantasy or Science Fiction Series	Timothy Stepeck and David Blass	Nominated	
