= Black Reel Award for Outstanding Comedy Series =

Annual US television award

- Awarded for: Outstanding Comedy Series
- Country: United States
- Presented by: Black Reel Awards for Television
- First award: 2017
- Currently held by: A Black Lady Sketch Show (2021)
- Website: blackreelawards.com

The Black Reel Award for Television for Outstanding Comedy Series is an annual award given to the best television comedy series of the year. Atlanta became the first winner in this category. Atlanta and Insecure are both tied for most wins in this category with two each. Black-ish holds the record with the most nominations with 5.

== 2010s ==
Year	Program	Showrunners	Network
2017; 1st
2017; 1st	Atlanta (Season 1)	Stephen Glover, showrunner	FX
2017; 1st	black-ish (Season 3)	Kenya Barris & Jonathan Groff, showrunner	ABC
2017; 1st	Chewing Gum (season 2)	Michaela Coel, showrunner	Netflix/E4
2017; 1st	Ballers (season 2)	Peter Berg & Evan T. Reilly, showrunner	HBO
2017; 1st	Insecure (Season 1)	Prentice Penny, showrunner	HBO
2018 (2nd)
2018 (2nd)	Atlanta (Season 2)	Stephen Glover, showrunner	FX
2018 (2nd)	Insecure (Season 2)	Prentice Penny, showrunner	HBO
2018 (2nd)	black-ish (Season 4)	Kenya Barris & Jonathan Groff, showrunner	ABC
2018 (2nd)	grown-ish (Season 1)	Kenya Barris, showrunner	Freeform
2018 (2nd)	Dear White People (Season 1)	Yvette Lee Bowser, showrunner	Netflix
2019; 3rd
2019; 3rd	Insecure (Season 3)	Prentice Penny, showrunner	HBO
2019; 3rd	grown-ish (Season 2)	Jenifer Rice-Genzuk, showrunner	Freeform
2019; 3rd	black-ish (Season 5)	Kenny Smith Jr. & Jonathan Groff, showrunner	ABC
2019; 3rd	She's Gotta Have It (Season 2)	Spike Lee, showrunner	Netflix
2019; 3rd	On My Block (Season 2)	Lauren Iungerich, showrunner	Netflix

== 2020s ==
Year	Program	Showrunners	Network
2020; 4th
2020; 4th	Insecure (Season 4)	Prentice Penny, showrunner	HBO
2020; 4th	black-ish (Season 6)	Kenny Smith Jr. & Jonathan Groff, showrunner	ABC
2020; 4th	Ballers (season 5)	Peter Berg & Evan T. Reilly, showrunner	HBO
2020; 4th	Dear White People (Season 3)	Yvette Lee Bowser, showrunner	Netflix
2020; 4th	High Fidelity (Season 1)	Sarah Kucserka & Veronica West	HULU
2021; 5th
2021; 5th	A Black Lady Sketch Show (Season 2)	Robin Thede, showrunner	HBO
2021; 5th	That Damn Michael Che (Season 1)	Michael Che, showrunner	HBO Max
2021; 5th	black-ish (Season 7)	Courtney Lily, showrunner	ABC
2021; 5th	Run the World (Season 1)	Yvette Lee Bowser, showrunner	Starz
2021; 5th	grown-ish (Season 3)	Julie Bean, showrunner	Freeform
2022; 6th	Abbott Elementary	Quinta Brunson, showrunner	ABC
2022; 6th	Atlanta	Donald Glover, showrunner	FX
2022; 6th	Black-ish	Courtney Lilly, showrunner	ABC
2022; 6th	Insecure	Prentice Penny, showrunner	HBO
2022; 6th	South Side	Bashir Salahuddin and Diallo Riddle, showrunners	HBO Max
2023; 7th	Abbott Elementary	Quinta Brunson, showrunner	ABC
2023; 7th	Atlanta	Donald Glover, showrunner	FX
2023; 7th	Harlem	Tracy Oliver, showrunner	Prime Video
2023; 7th	Unprisoned	Yvette Lee Bowser, showrunner	Hulu
2023; 7th	The Upshaws	Regina Y. Hicks, showrunner	Netflix

== Programs with multiple awards ==
2 awards

- Abbott Elementary (consecutive)
- Atlanta (consecutive)
- Insecure (consecutive)

== Programs with multiple nominations ==
5 nominations

- black-ish

4 nominations

- Insecure

3 nominations

- grown-ish

2 nominations

- Atlanta
- Ballers
- Dear White People

== Total awards by network ==
- HBO - 3
- FX - 2
