= Black Reel Award for Outstanding Actor, Comedy Series =

Annual US television award

- Awarded for: Outstanding Actor, Comedy Series
- Country: United States
- Presented by: Black Reel Awards for Television
- First award: 2017
- Currently held by: Anthony Anderson, Black-ish (2021)
- Website: blackreelawards.com

This article lists the winners and nominees for the Black Reel Award for Television for Outstanding Actor, Comedy Series. This category was first introduced in 2017 and won by Donald Glover for Atlanta. Glover and Don Cheadle are currently tied with the most wins with 2. Anthony Anderson is currently the most nominated actor with 5 nominations.

== Winners and nominees ==
Winners are listed first and highlighted in bold.

=== 2010s ===
Year	Actor	Series	Network	Ref
2017
2017	**Donald Glover**	**Atlanta**	**FX**	
2017	Dwayne Johnson	Ballers	HBO	
2017	Anthony Anderson	Black-ish	ABC	
2017	Brandon P. Bell	Dear White People	Netflix	
2017	Kevin Hart	Real Husbands of Hollywood	BET	
2018
2018	**Donald Glover**	**Atlanta**	**FX**	
2018	Anthony Anderson	Black-ish	ABC	
2018	Tracy Morgan	The Last O.G.	TBS	
2018	Dwayne Johnson	Ballers	HBO	
2018	Jerrod Carmichael	The Carmichael Show	NBC	
2019
2019	**Don Cheadle**	**Black Monday**	**Showtime**	
2019	Anthony Anderson	Black-ish	ABC	
2019	Tracy Morgan	The Last O.G.	TBS	
2019	Idris Elba	Turn Up Charlie	Netflix	
2019	Keegan-Michael Key	Friends from College	Netflix	

=== 2020s ===
Year	Actor	Series	Network	Ref
2020
2020	**Don Cheadle**	**Black Monday**	**Showtime**	
2020	Anthony Anderson	Black-ish	ABC	
2020	Dwayne Johnson	Ballers	HBO	
2020	Tracy Morgan	The Last O.G.	TBS	
2020	DeRon Horton	Dear White People	Netflix	
2021
2021	**Anthony Anderson**	**Black-ish**	**ABC**	
2021	Michael Che	That Damn Michael Che	HBO Max	
2021	Lamorne Morris	Woke	HULU	
2021	Trevor Jackson	grown-ish	Freeform	
2021	Asante Blackk	Social Distance	Netflix	

== Superlatives ==
Superlative	Outstanding Actor, Comedy Series
Actor with most awards	Don Cheadle; Donald Glover (2)
Actor with most nominations	Anthony Anderson (5)
Actor with most nominations without ever winning	Dwayne Johnson; Tracy Morgan (3)

== Programs with multiple awards ==
2 awards

- Atlanta
- Black Monday

== Performers with multiple awards ==
2 awards

- Don Cheadle (2 consecutive)
- Donald Glover (2 consecutive)

== Programs with multiple nominations ==
5 nominations

- Black-ish

3 nominations

- Ballers
- The Last O.G.

2 nominations

- Atlanta
- Black Monday
- Dear White People

== Performers with multiple nominations ==
5 nominations

- Anthony Anderson

3 nominations

- Dwayne Johnson
- Tracy Morgan

2 nominations

- Don Cheadle
- Donald Glover

== Total awards by network ==
- FX – 2
- Showtime – 2
- ABC – 1
