= Black Reel Award for Outstanding Supporting Actor, Comedy Series =

Annual US television award

- Awarded for: Outstanding Supporting Actor, Comedy Series
- Country: United States
- Presented by: Black Reel Awards for Television
- First award: 2017
- Currently held by: Kenan Thompson, Saturday Night Live (2021)
- Website: blackreelawards.com

This article lists the winners and nominees for the Black Reel Award for Television for Outstanding Supporting Actor, Comedy Series. This category was first introduced in 2017 and won by Tituss Burgess for Unbreakable Kimmy Schmidt. Burgess & Thompson are currently tied with most wins in this category wins with 2. Jay Ellis & Laurence Fishburne are currently tied as the most nominated actor with 4 nominations.

== Winners and nominees ==
Winners are listed first and highlighted in bold.

=== 2010s ===
Year	Actor	Series	Network	Ref
2017
2017	**Tituss Burgess**	**Unbreakable Kimmy Schmidt**	**Netflix**	
2017	LaKeith Stanfield	Atlanta	FX	
2017	Laurence Fishburne	Black-ish	ABC	
2017	Jay Ellis	Insecure	HBO	
2017	Andre Braugher	Brooklyn Nine-Nine	Fox	
2018
2018	**LaKeith Stanfield**	**Atlanta**	**FX**	
2018	Laurence Fishburne	Black-ish	ABC	
2018	Jay Ellis	Insecure	HBO	
2018	Terry Crews	Brooklyn Nine-Nine	Fox	
2018	Tituss Burgess	Unbreakable Kimmy Schmidt	Netflix	
2019
2019	**Tituss Burgess**	**Unbreakable Kimmy Schmidt**	**Netflix**	
2019	Laurence Fishburne	Black-ish	ABC	
2019	Jay Ellis	Insecure	HBO	
2019	Kenan Thompson	Saturday Night Live	NBC	
2019	Anthony Ramos	She's Gotta Have It	Netflix	

=== 2020s ===
Year	Actor	Series	Network	Ref
2020
2020	**Kenan Thompson**	**Saturday Night Live**	**NBC**	
2020	J.B. Smoove	Curb Your Enthusiasm	HBO	
2020	John David Washington	Ballers	HBO	
2020	Mahershala Ali	Ramy	HULU	
2020	Jay Ellis	Insecure	HBO	
2021
2021	**Kenan Thompson**	**Saturday Night Live**	**NBC**	
2021	Laurence Fishburne	Black-ish	ABC	
2021	Deon Cole	Black-ish	ABC	
2021	Justice Smith	Generation	HBO Max	
2021	David Alan Grier	Dad Stop Embarrassing Me!	Netflix	

== Superlatives ==
Superlative	Outstanding Supporting Actor, Comedy Series
Actor with most awards	Tituss Burgess; Kenan Thompson(2)
Actor with most nominations	Jay Ellis; Laurence Fishburne (4)
Actor with most nominations without ever winning	Jay Ellis; Laurence Fishburne (4)

== Programs with multiple awards ==
2 awards

- Saturday Night Live
- Unbreakable Kimmy Schmidt

== Performers with multiple awards ==
2 awards

- Tituss Burgess
- Kenan Thompson (consecutive)

== Programs with multiple nominations ==
5 nominations

- Black-ish

4 nominations

- Insecure

3 nominations

- Saturday Night Live
- Unbreakable Kimmy Schmidt

2 nominations

- Atlanta
- Brooklyn Nine-Nine

== Performers with multiple nominations ==
4 nominations

- Jay Ellis
- Laurence Fishburne

3 nominations

- Tituss Burgess
- Kenan Thompson

2 nominations

- LaKeith Stanfield

== Total awards by network ==
- NBC - 2
- Netflix - 2
- FX - 1
