= Black Reel Award for Outstanding Guest Actor, Comedy Series =

Annual US television award

- Awarded for: Outstanding Guest Actor, Comedy Series
- Country: United States
- Presented by: Black Reel Awards for Television
- First award: 2017
- Currently held by: Dave Chappelle, Saturday Night Live (2021)
- Website: blackreelawards.com

This article lists the winners and nominees for the Black Reel Award for Television for Outstanding Guest Actor, Comedy Series. The category was first introduced as Outstanding Guest Performer, Comedy Series, honoring both male and female performers in guest-starring roles on television. In 2018, it was divided by gender, resulting in creation of current male-specific category.

== Winners and nominees ==
Winners are listed first and highlighted in bold.

=== 2010s ===
Year	Performer	Series	Network	Ref
Outstanding Guest Performer, Comedy Series
2017
2017	**Dave Chappelle**	**Saturday Night Live**	**NBC**	
2017	Angela Bassett	Master of None	Netflix	
2017	Dwayne Johnson	Saturday Night Live	NBC	
2017	Mike Epps	Survivor's Remorse	Starz	
2017	Rashida Jones	black-ish	ABC	
Outstanding Guest Actor, Comedy Series
2018
2018	**Katt Williams**	**Atlanta**	**FX**	
2018	Sterling K. Brown	Saturday Night Live	NBC	
2018	Sterling K. Brown	Insecure	HBO	
2018	Chadwick Boseman	Saturday Night Live	NBC	
2018	Donald Glover	Saturday Night Live	NBC	
2019
2019	**Katt Williams**	**black-ish**	**ABC**	
2019	Ernie Hudson	Ballers	HBO	
2019	RuPaul	Grace and Frankie	Netflix	
2019	Idris Elba	Saturday Night Live	NBC	
2019	Kenan Thompson	Unbreakable Kimmy Schmidt	NBC	

=== 2020s ===
Year	Actor	Series	Network	Ref
2020
2020	**Eddie Murphy**	**Saturday Night Live**	**NBC**	
2020	Neil Brown Jr.	Insecure	HBO	
2020	Blair Underwood	Dear White People	Netflix	
2020	Sterling K. Brown	The Marvelous Mrs. Maisel	Amazon Prime Video	
2020	J.B. Smoove	The Last O.G.	TBS	
2021
2021	**Dave Chappelle**	**Saturday Night Live**	**NBC**	
2021	Daniel Kaluuya	Saturday Night Live	NBC	
2021	Regé-Jean Page	Saturday Night Live	NBC	
2021	Marcus Scribner	grown-ish	Freeform	
2021	Samuel L. Jackson	Staged	BBC One	

== Superlatives ==
Superlative	Outstanding Guest Actor, Comedy Series
Actor with most awards	Dave Chappelle; Katt Williams (2)
Actor with most nominations	Sterling K. Brown (3)
Actor with most nominations without ever winning	Sterling K. Brown (3)

== Programs with multiple awards ==
3 awards

- Saturday Night Live

== Performers with multiple awards ==
2 Wins

- Dave Chappelle
- Katt Williams (2 consecutive)

== Programs with multiple nominations ==
10 nominations

- Saturday Night Live

2 nominations

- Insecure

== Performers with multiple nominations ==
3 nominations

- Sterling K. Brown

2 nominations

- Dave Chappelle
- Katt Williams

== Total awards by network ==
- NBC - 3
- ABC - 1
- FX - 1
