= Black Reel Award for Outstanding Writing, Comedy Series =

Annual US television award

- Awarded for: Outstanding Writing, Comedy Series
- Country: United States
- Presented by: Black Reel Awards for Television
- First award: 2017
- Most recent winner: Rochee Jeffrey Woke (2021)
- Website: blackreelawards.com

The Black Reel Award for Television for Outstanding Writing, Comedy Series is an annual award given in honor of a writer or writers who produced an outstanding story or screenplay for an episode of a television comedy series during the primetime network season episode of the year.

== 2010s ==
Year	Program	Episode	Nominee	Network
2017; 1st
2017; 1st	Atlanta	"B.A.N."	Donald Glover	FX
2017; 1st	Master of None	"Thanksgiving"	Lena Waithe & Aziz Ansari	Netflix
2017; 1st	black-ish	"Lemons"	Kenya Barris	ABC
2017; 1st	Insecure	"Broken as Fuck"	Issa Rae	HBO
2017; 1st	Chewing Gum	"Age Ain't Nothing But a Number"	Michaela Coel	Netflix / E4
2018 (2nd)
2018 (2nd)	Atlanta	"Teddy Perkins"	Donald Glover	FX
2018 (2nd)	Atlanta	"Barbershop"	Stephen Glover	FX
2018 (2nd)	black-ish	"Juneteenth"	Peter Saji	ABC
2018 (2nd)	Insecure	"Hella Perspective"	Issa Rae	HBO
2018 (2nd)	The Last O.G.	"Pilot"	Jordan Peele & John Carcieri	TBS
2019; 3rd
2019; 3rd	black-ish	"Black Like Us"	Peter Saji	ABC
2019; 3rd	black-ish	"Relatively Grown Man"	Steven White	ABC
2019; 3rd	She's Gotta Have It	"#NationTime"	Radha Blank	Netflix
2019; 3rd	Insecure	"Ghost-Like"	Issa Rae & Natasha Rothwell	HBO
2019; 3rd	Insecure	"Obsessed-Like"	Prentice Penny	HBO

== 2020s ==
Year	Program	Episode	Nominee	Network
2020; 4th
2020; 4th	High Fidelity	"Uptown"	Zoe Kravitz & E.T. Feigenbaum	HULU
2020; 4th	BlackAF	"hard to believe, but still because of slavery"	Allison McDonald	Netflix
2020; 4th	Insecure	"Lowkey Happy"	Natasha Rothwell	HBO
2020; 4th	black-ish	"Hair Day"	Marquita J. Robinson	ABC
2020; 4th	Insecure	"Lowkey Movin' On"	Syreeta Singleton	HBO
2021; 5th
2021; 5th	Woke	"Black People for Rent"	Rochee Jeffrey	HBO
2021; 5th	Girls5Eva	"Carma"	Azie Dungey & Anna Drezen	Peacock
2021; 5th	black-ish	"Mission & Ambitions"	Melanie Boysaw & Isaiah Lester	ABC
2021; 5th	That Damn Michael Che	"Policin"	Michael Che, Wil Sylvince, Sam Jay, Rosebud Baker, Reggie Conquest, Matt Richards, Kevin Iso, Godfrey, Gary Richardson, Cipha Sounds & Calise Hawkins	HBO Max
2021; 5th	A Black Lady Sketch Show	"But the Tilapias Are Fine Though, Right?"	Ashley Nicole Black, Robin Thede, Shenovia Large, Rae Sanni, Lauren Ashley Smith, Kristin Layne Tucker, Kindsey Young, Holly Walker, Charla Lauriston, Akilah Green	HBO

== Programs with multiple awards ==
2 awards

- Atlanta (consecutive)

== Programs with multiple nominations ==
6 nominations

- black-ish
- Insecure

3 nominations

- Atlanta

== Total awards by network ==
- FX - 2
- HULU - 2
- ABC - 1

== Individuals with multiple awards ==
2 wins

- Donald Glover

== Individuals with multiple nominations ==
3 nominations

- Issa Rae

2 nominations

- Donald Glover
- Natasha Rothwell
- Peter Saji
