= List of awardees and nominees for the Black Reel Award for Outstanding Guest Actress, Drama Series =

Annual US television award

Black Reel Award for Outstanding Guest Actress, Drama Series
- Awarded for: Outstanding Guest Actress, Drama Series
- Country: United States
- Presented by: Black Reel Awards for Television
- First award: 2017
- Currently held by: Phylicia Rashad, This Is Us (2021)
- Website: blackreelawards.com

This article lists the winners and nominees for the Black Reel Award for Television for Outstanding Guest Actress, Drama Series. The category was first introduced as Outstanding Guest Performer, Drama Series, honoring both actors and actresses in guest starring roles on television. In 2018, the category was split into categories for each gender, resulting in the name change to its current title.

== Winners and nominees ==
Winners are listed first and highlighted in bold.

=== 2010s ===
Year	Performer	Series	Network	Ref
Outstanding Guest Performer, Drama Series
2017
2017	**Mahershala Ali**	**Luke Cage**	**Netflix**	
2017	Phylicia Rashad	Empire	FOX	
2017	Orlando Jones	American Gods	Starz	
2017	Frankie Faison	Luke Cage	Netflix	
2017	Khandi Alexander	Scandal	ABC	
2017	Jermel Nakia	This Is Us	NBC	
Outstanding Guest Actress, Drama Series
2018
2018	**Phylicia Rashad**	**Empire**	**FOX**	
2018	Samira Wiley	The Handmaid's Tale	HULU	
2018	Jill Scott	Black Lightning	The CW	
2018	Michael Michele	Queen Sugar	OWN	
2018	Cicely Tyson	How to Get Away With Murder	ABC	
2019
2019	**Phylicia Rashad**	**This Is Us**	**NBC**	
2019	Rutina Wesley	The Walking Dead	AMC	
2019	Erika Alexander	Black Lightning	The CW	
2019	Marla Gibbs	NCIS	CBS	
2019	Cicely Tyson	How to Get Away With Murder	ABC	

=== 2020s ===
Year	Actress	Series	Network	Ref
2020
2020	**Cicely Tyson**	**How to Get Away With Murder**	**ABC**	
2020	L. Scott Caldwell	All Rise	CBS	
2020	Cree Summer	Queen Sugar	OWN	
2020	Phylicia Rashad	This Is Us	NBC	
2020	Jill Scott	Black Lightning	The CW	
2021
2021	**Phylicia Rashad**	**This Is Us**	**NBC**	
2021	Sophie Okonedo	Ratched	Netflix	
2021	Gail Bean	Snowfall	FX	
2021	Rosario Dawson	The Mandalorian	Disney+	
2021	Florence Kasumba	The Falcon and the Winter Soldier	Disney+	

== Superlatives ==
Superlative	Outstanding Guest Actress, Drama Series
Actress with most awards	Phylicia Rashad (3)
Actress with most nominations	Phylicia Rashad (5)
Actress with most nominations without ever winning	Jill Scott (2)

== Programs with multiple awards ==
2 awards

- This Is Us

== Performers with multiple awards ==
3 awards

- Phylicia Rashad (2 consecutively)

== Programs with multiple nominations ==
4 nominations

- How to Get Away With Murder

3 nominations

- Black Lightning
- This Is Us

2 nominations

- Empire
- Queen Sugar

== Performers with multiple nominations ==
5 nominations

- Phylicia Rashad

4 nominations

- Cicely Tyson

2 nominations

- Jill Scott

== Total awards by network ==
- NBC - 2
- ABC - 1
- FOX - 1
