= Black Reel Award for Outstanding Breakthrough Performance, Male =

Award presented annually by the Black Reel Awards

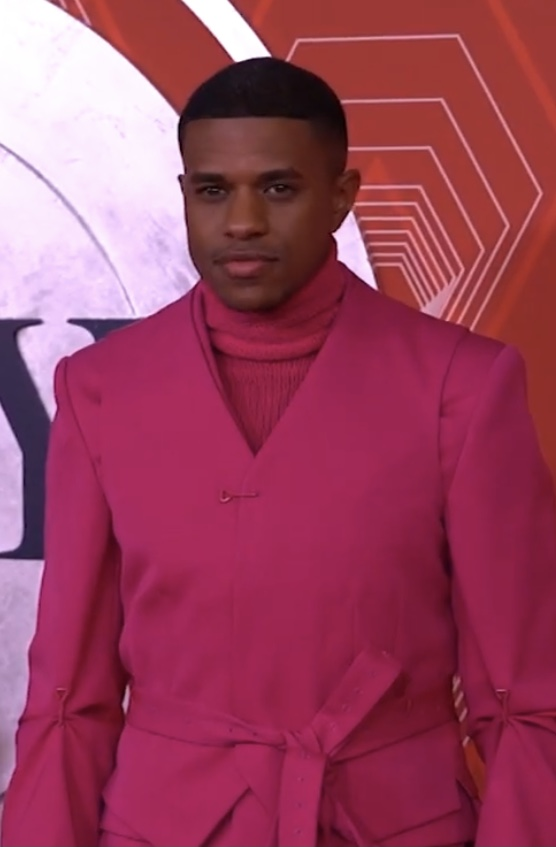
- The 2023 recipient: Jeremy Pope
- Awarded for: Outstanding Breakthrough Performance, Male
- Country: United States
- Presented by: Black Reel Awards (BRAs)
- First award: Black Reel Awards of 2014
- Most recent winner: Jeremy Pope; The Inspection (Black Reel Awards of 2023)
- Website: blackreelawards.com

This article lists the winners and nominees for the Black Reel Award for Outstanding Breakthrough Performance, Male. Prior to 2014 the category was not gender specific, and was just called Outstanding Breakthrough Performance. Derek Luke was the first recipient (male or female) to win the Outstanding Breakthrough Performance category. Luke was also the first performer to win a Black Reel Awards in a Lead or Supporting performance and the Breakthrough performance in the same year.

Currently, Daniel Kaluuya is the only male actor to win the BRA "Triple Crown" acting award with wins in the Lead, Supporting and Breakthrough categories. Kaluuya took home the award for Outstanding Actor & Outstanding Breakthrough Performance, Male for Get Out and won the award for Outstanding Supporting Actor for Judas and the Black Messiah.

At age 14, Abraham Attah became the youngest actor to win this award for Beasts of No Nation and at age 34, Kingsley Ben-Adir became the oldest winner in this category for One Night in Miami....

== Winners and nominees ==
Winners are listed first and highlighted in bold.

=== 2010s ===
Year	Actor	Film	Ref
Outstanding Breakthrough Performance, Male
2014
2014	**Barkhad Abdi**	**Captain Phillips** **(Outstanding Supporting Actor Winner)**	
2014	Chadwick Boseman	42	
2014	Skylan Brooks	The Inevitable Defeat of Mister and Pete	
2014	Tequan Richmond	Blue Caprice (Outstanding Supporting Actor Nominee)	
2014	Keith Stanfield	Short Term 12 (Outstanding Supporting Actor Nominee)	
2015
2015	**Tyler James Williams**	**Dear White People**	
2015	Brandon P. Bell	Dear White People	
2015	David Gyasi	Interstellar	
2015	Andre Holland	Selma	
2015	Stephan James	Selma	
2016
2016	**Abraham Attah**	**Beasts of No Nation** (Outstanding Actor Nominee)	
2016	RJ Cyler	Me and Earl and the Dying Girl	
2016	O'Shea Jackson Jr.	Straight Outta Compton	
2016	Jason Mitchell (Outstanding Supporting Actor Nominee)	Straight Outta Compton	
2016	Shameik Moore	Dope	
2017
2017	**Trevante Rhodes**	**Moonlight**	
2017	Alex Hibbert	Moonlight	
2017	Ashton Sanders	Moonlight (Outstanding Supporting Actor Nominee)	
2017	Markees Christmas	Morris From America	
2017	Jovan Adepo	Fences (Outstanding Supporting Actor Nominee)	
2018
2018	**Daniel Kaluuya**	**Get Out** **(Outstanding Actor Winner)**	
2018	Lil Rel Howery	Get Out (Outstanding Supporting Actor Nominee)	
2018	Sterling K. Brown	Marshall	
2018	Nnamdi Asomugha	Crown Heights	
2018	J. Quinton Johnson	Last Flag Flying	
2019
2019	**Winston Duke**	**Black Panther**	
2019	John David Washington	BlacKkKlansman (Outstanding Actor Nominee)	
2019	Daveed Diggs	Blindspotting	
2019	Brian Tyree Henry	If Beale Street Could Talk (Outstanding Supporting Actor Nominee)	
2019	Donald Glover	Solo: A Star Wars Story	

=== 2020s ===
Year	Actor	Film	Ref
2020
2020	**Kelvin Harrison Jr.**	**Waves** (Outstanding Actor Nominee)	
2020	Tituss Burgess	Dolemite Is My Name	
2020	Jonathan Majors	The Last Black Man in San Francisco (Outstanding Supporting Actor Nominee)	
2020	Aldis Hodge	Clemency (Outstanding Supporting Actor Nominee)	
2020	Jimmie Fails	The Last Black Man in San Francisco (Outstanding Actor Nominee)	
2021
2021	**Kingsley Ben-Adir**	**One Night in Miami...** (Outstanding Actor Nominee)	
2021	Yahya Abdul-Mateen II	The Trial of the Chicago 7	
2021	Dusan Brown	Ma Rainey's Black Bottom	
2021	Eli Goree	One Night in Miami...	
2021	Ntare Guma Mbaho Mwine	Farewell Amor	
2022
2022	**Anthony Ramos**	**In the Heights**	
2022	Deon Cole	The Harder They Fall	
2022	Edi Gathegi	The Harder They Fall	
2022	Joshua Henry	Tick, Tick...Boom!	
2022	Caleb McLaughlin	Concrete Cowboy	
2023
2023	**Jeremy Pope**	**The Inspection** **(Outstanding Actor Winner)**	
2023	Jalyn Hall	Till	
2023	Daryl McCormack	Good Luck to You, Leo Grande	
2023	Quintessa Swindell	Black Adam	
2023	Micheal Ward	Empire of Light (Outstanding Supporting Actor Nominee)	

== Multiple nominations from the same film ==
- Tyler James Williams (winner) and Brandon P. Bell in Dear White People (2015)
- Andre Holland and Stephan James in Selma (2015)
- Jason Mitchell and O'Shea Jackson Jr. in Straight Outta Compton (2016)
- Trevante Rhodes (winner), Alex Hibbert, and Ashton Sanders in Moonlight (2017)
- Daniel Kaluuya (winner) and Lil Rel Howery in Get Out (2018)
- Jonathan Majors and Jimmie Fails in The Last Black Man in San Francisco (2020)
- Kingsley Ben-Adir (winner) and Eli Goree in One Night in Miami... (2021)
- Deon Cole & Edi Gathegi in The Harder They Fall (2022)

== Age superlatives ==
Record	Actor	Film	Age (in years)
Oldest winner	Kingsley Ben-Adir	One Night in Miami...	34
Oldest nominee	Ntare Guma Mbaho Mwine	Farewell Amor	53
Youngest winner	Abraham Attah	Beasts of No Nation	14
Youngest nominee	C.J. Sanders	Ray	8
