= Ashley Blaine Featherson =

American actress

Ashley Blaine Featherson-Jenkins
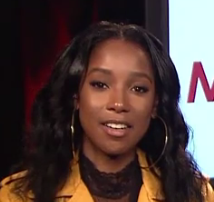
- Featherson in 2017
- Born: Ashley Blaine Featherson; December 4, 1987 (age 38)
- Education: Howard University
- Occupation: Actress
- Years active: 2010–present
- Known for: Dear White People
- Spouse: Darroll Jenkins (m. 2021)

Ashley Blaine Featherson-Jenkins (née Featherson; born December 4, 1987) is an American actress. She is best known as the co-creator and star of Black&SexyTV's Hello Cupid. She also appeared in the web series Roomieloverfriends, the film Bad Hair, and was a main cast member on the Netflix series Dear White People (2017–2021).

== Early life and education ==
Born Ashley Blaine Featherson, she was raised in Gaithersburg, Maryland. She first acted at age four in a school production and enjoyed it from that age. When she was 14 she began to perform at the Studio Theatre in Washington, D.C. and studied under costume designer Reggie Ray.

Featherson attended Howard University and graduated from the Fine Arts department, where she majored in musical theater. She is a member of the Alpha Kappa Alpha sorority. Featherson has stated that she most admires the career and work of Vanessa Williams.

== Career ==
Featherson co-created the web series Hello Cupid with Lena Waithe in 2012. The show was distributed by Black & Sexy TV and eventually rebooted. Featherson also starred in the series opposite Hayley Marie Norman.

Her first feature film role was in Justin Simien's Dear White People in 2014. She reprised the supporting role of Joelle in the 2017 Netflix television series adaptation of the same name.

She co-starred in the 2018 web series Leimert Park, which premiered at Sundance. Featherson also appeared in the re-creation of the photograph "A Great Day in Harlem", organized by Netflix's Strong Black Lead initiative.

In 2020, she collaborated with Simien again on his comedy horror film Bad Hair. That year she also worked with The Lip Bar on a makeup campaign. She also helped develop a three-piece collection for dark skinned women with Mented Cosmetics.

== Personal life ==
Featherson announced her engagement to sports agent Darroll Jenkins in September 2020, and married him on September 5, 2021, at Hummingbird Nest Ranch in Santa Susana, California. Longtime friends, they began dating in 2018.

== Filmography ==
=== Film ===
Year	Title	Role	Notes
2010	Bonds	Simone Bancroft	Short
2014	Dear White People	Curls	
2014	David's Reverie	Dancer	Short
2014	12 Days of Christmas	Zene	Short
2015	Doors	Morgan	Short
2015	Stages	Skye	Short
2016	Paint It Black	Shirley Mae	
2016	Drew	Stephanie Lloyd	TV movie
2020	Bad Hair	Rosalyn	

=== Television ===
Year	Title	Role	Notes
2011	State of Georgia	Student #3	Episode: "Pilot"
2012	My Gimpy Life	Lady in Orange	Episode: "Inspirational"
2013	The Number	Whitney	Episode: "The Slumberette Party"
2013	My Crazy Roommate	Leslie	Episode: "The Puppy"
2013–2014	Hello Cupid	Whitney	Main cast
2014	Glee	Shaynice	Episode: "Bash"
2014	Roomieloverfriends	Whitney	Recurring cast: season 3
2015	Mann & Wife	Ms.Lincoln	Episode: "Undercover Mann"
2016	The Number: The Reboot	Whitney	Episode: "The Intro"
2017–2021	Dear White People	Joelle Brooks	Main cast
2022	Grand Crew	Talia	Recurring cast
