= Nia Jervier =

American actress

- Born: New York City, New York
- Occupation: Actress
- Years active: 2009–present

Nia Jervier is an American actress. She is best known for playing Kelsey in the comedy drama series Dear White People and Tierra in the drama series The Chi.

== Early life ==
Jervier was born in Brooklyn, New York City to Caribbean parents. She attended Fiorello H. LaGuardia High School. She became interested in acting thanks to her aunt who convinced her mother to put her into her theatre because she could sing. She was a graduate of the American Musical and Dramatic Academy in New York.

== Career ==
Jervier played Coco's friend in the comedy drama film Dear White People. She also had a recurring role in the comedy drama series of the movie but this time she played a woman named Kelsey. She had a recurring role as Vanessa in season 2 of the comedy series Twenties. She joined the drama series The Chi for Season 5 where she plays Tierra.

== Personal life ==
She is a fan of theatre and calls William Shakespeare, Voltaire and Stephen Sondheim her main influences. Her acting idol is Diahann Carroll, the first black woman to win a Tony Award. Her favourite musicians are Bob Marley, Cole Porter and Dinah Washington.

== Filmography ==
=== Film ===
| Year | Title | Role | Notes |
|---|---|---|---|
| 2009 | La La Land | Bunny | |
| 2014 | Dear White People | Coco's Friend | |
| 2014 | Ladylike | Vaughan | Short |
| 2018 | Step Sisters | Saundra | |

=== Television ===
| Year | Title | Role | Notes |
|---|---|---|---|
| 2014-2015 | Film Lab Presents | Bunny | 2 episodes |
| 2017-2019 | Dear White People | Kelsey | 20 episodes |
| 2021 | Twenties | Vanessa | 5 episodes |
| 2018-2025 | The Chi | Tierra | 22 episodes |
