= Hollywood Heights (TV series) =

American television series

- Genre: Drama; Soap opera; Telenovela
- Based on: Alcanzar una estrella by Jesús Calzada
- Developed by: Josh Griffith
- Written by: Josh Griffith
- Starring: Cody Longo; Brittany Underwood; Robert Adamson; Daphne Ashbrook; Brandon Bell; Merrin Dungey; Ashley Holliday; Shannon Kane; Tina Huang; Hunter King; Nick Krause; Brian Letscher; Yara Martinez; Grayson McCouch; Melissa Ordway; Rick Otto; Meredith Salenger; Justin Wilczynski; Jama Williamson; Carlos Ponce
- Theme music composer: Matthew Tishler; Andrew Ang
- Opening theme: "Something in the Air", performed by Cody Longo
- Countries of origin: United States; México
- Original language: English
- No. of seasons: 1
- No. of episodes: 80 (list of episodes)

Production
- Executive producers: Jill Farren-Phelps; Hisham Abed; Josh Griffith
- Producers: Jeanne Haney; Jonathan Fishman; Tom Rotolo; Debbie Bachtell; Wally White
- Running time: 43 minutes
- Production companies: Sony Pictures Television; Televisa; MTM Production; Nickelodeon Productions

Original release
- Network: Nick at Nite; (June 18 – August 10, 2012); TeenNick; (August 13 – October 5, 2012)
- Release: June 18 – October 5, 2012

Hollywood Heights is a telenovela-style limited series which aired on Nick at Nite and TeenNick from June 18 to October 5, 2012. Loosely based on the Mexican telenovela Alcanzar una estrella (To Reach a Star), the series follows aspiring singer-songwriter Loren Tate (Brittany Underwood), whose life changes forever when she crosses paths with her rock star idol Eddie Duran (Cody Longo). Hollywood Heights was executive produced by six-time Emmy Award-winner Jill Farren-Phelps, and co-executive produced by Hisham Abed and Josh Griffith, who also served as head writer.

The series was announced in May 2012 as an international co-production between Sony Pictures Television and Televisa, the Mexican production company which owns the rights to the original telenovela. As with the Latin American telenovela format, Hollywood Heights would run every weeknight at 9 p.m. EST through October. Nick at Nite previewed the first episode several times starting on June 11, 2012, before the 80-episode limited series' official premiere on June 18, 2012. The show initially ran on weeknights at 9 p.m. (EST). In May, the network had announced that actor James Franco would appear in a multi-episode story arc as Osborne "Oz" Silver, an eccentric and ruthless movie mogul. Franco's first appearance was on June 29, 2012. Halfway through the series on August 13, 2012, it was moved to Nick at Nite's sister channel TeenNick at 8 p.m. EST.

== Plot ==
Loren Tate (Brittany Underwood) is a high school senior dreaming of a career as a singer-songwriter—and of hunky rock star Eddie Duran (Cody Longo). Eddie, meanwhile, is not happy with the direction his career has taken—toward shallow pop music rather than the soulful material he prefers. Following Eddie's manager and label pushing him to give them new songs for a new album, Eddie uses it as an opportunity to launch a new contest in which he can collaborate with a fan on a new song (that is hopefully more to his musical liking). Meanwhile, shy Loren, is very hesitant to enter Eddie's contest and fears that any song she writes isn't good enough for her idol. But with Loren's cool single mom, Nora (Jama Williamson), and sassy best friend, Melissa (Ashley Holliday), egging her on, she enters and wins Eddie's songwriting contest, and worlds collide. As Loren is increasingly dazzled by (and welcomed into) Eddie's celebrity world, he is realizing how unhappy he is, trapped in a machine of his own making and at the mercy of his many fans and demanding manager Jake (Brandon Bell). Meanwhile, Loren and Melissa navigate the intrigues of high school life and mean girl Adriana (Hunter King); Melissa's brother Phil (Robert Adamson) gets mixed up with the wrong people; Eddie's father, 1980s musician Max Duran (Carlos Ponce), hopes to end his son's relationship with the duplicitous climber Chloe Conway (Melissa Ordway), who is cheating on Eddie with the ambitious Tyler (Justin Wilczynski), a struggling actor that worked with Eddie but now despises him for his success and who has mysterious ties with Chloe's hidden past.

== Episodes ==
In the tradition of Latin American telenovelas, Hollywood Heights was conceived as a limited series, in this case 80 episodes, with its storylines resolved by the end of the run. The first 40 of these were broadcast on Nickelodeon/Nick at Nite, with the series moving to TeenNick for the remaining 40.

== Characters ==
=== Main ===
Pictured: (standing, l-r) Melissa (Ashley Holliday), Nora (Jama Williamson), Eddie (Cody Longo, on ledge), Chloe (Melissa Ordway), Kelly (Yara Martinez), Adam (Nick Krause) (sitting, l-r) Max (Carlos Ponce), Loren (Brittany Underwood), Tyler (Justin Wilczyniski), Traci (Shannon Kane), Jake (Brandon Bell)

- Loren Tate (Brittany Underwood) is an 18-year-old student with dreams of being a singer-songwriter. She is intelligent and hardworking, but struggles to decide between following her dreams or going to college. Everything changes when she wins Eddie Duran's songwriting contest.
- Eddie Duran (Cody Longo) is a 22-year-old rock star. He is often caught between the music and the business but still holds onto traces of his youthful spark. He was engaged to model Chloe Carter, but he broke it off due to her constant lying. His mother, Katy Duran, was killed in a hit-and-run car accident, which unbeknownst to Eddie, was caused by Chloe and Tyler. He is a mentor to Loren Tate, but as their work progresses his feelings for her grow. Eventually, he admitted he's in love with Loren, and is now her boyfriend.
- Chloe Carter (Melissa Ordway) is Eddie Duran's ex-fiancée, a model from Fresno (real name Cynthia Kowalski) who schemes to marry Eddie and get the "rock star" lifestyle she always dreamed of. Eddie breaks things off when he discovers her affair with Tyler Rorke; she is determined to get Eddie back and tear down Loren Tate. It is later revealed that she and Tyler were the ones who caused the accident that killed Eddie's mother, Katy Duran.
- Tyler Rorke (Justin Wilczynski) is an arrogant actor whose pompous attitude has gotten him kicked off every acting job he has ever landed. His unsuccessful career has left him bitter and jealous of Eddie Duran's growing fame, and wanting to upset the rock star's seemingly perfect life. At the end of the season, he abandons Chloe, claiming that it is better for both of them if they never see each other again.
- Melissa Sanders (Ashley Holliday) is Loren's ever-positive and fearless best friend and Adam's girlfriend. Although Melissa has had issues with her mother and brother for most of her life, she and her father get along well. Her mother is constantly comparing her to her brother, and until later in the season, she is always bringing Melissa down. It is later revealed that her aunt Beth is actually her biological mother. She is dating Adam, but is afraid of losing him in the fall because he got into school in New York.
- Nora Tate (Jama Williamson) is Loren's mom and #1 fan. She helps guide her daughter through the struggles of high school and a budding music career. As a single mom, Nora tries to stay as close to her daughter's life as possible, without smothering her creativity and spirit. Even while dealing with her own complicated career and love life, Loren is her first priority. She has a secret love life with Max Duran. At the end of season one he is dating and living with her.
- Max Duran (Carlos Ponce) is Eddie's rocker dad who struggles to move on after his wife Katy's tragic and untimely death. Most of the time he and Eddie have a great relationship, even when he doesn't see eye-to-eye with the management surrounding his son. He opened a new nightclub, hoping it could be a new beginning for himself, leaving the fandom and fame to Eddie. Nora brings out the best in him and he enjoys her company.
- Adam (Nick Krause) is Loren and Melissa's indie-rocker friend. As well as being a great support system for Loren and her rapidly growing fame, he is Melissa's devoted and thoughtful boyfriend who loves her with all his heart. He got accepted into NYU, his dream college. He wants Melissa to come but she's not sure what Lisa and Gus will say.
- Jackie Kowalski (Daphne Ashbrook) is Chloe's mother who is brought to L.A by Tyler to supposedly help Chloe, but she may just be a pawn in Tyler's game. Chloe previously told everyone that her mother was dead, while, in fact, she simply lived in another part of California before moving in with Chloe later in the first season. She later moves back to Fresno to live with her when her plan fails.
- Jake Madsen (Brandon Bell) is Eddie's type-A manager and friend who has overseen his career from the very beginning. His life tends to revolve around all things Eddie and the entertainment business, which leaves him little time to spend with his wife, Traci. He continuously battles to find a balance between the Hollywood lifestyle and his family life, but after kissing his co-worker and wife's best friend, Kelly he acts strange and ends up lying to his wife. At the end of the season Traci leaves Jake.
- Traci Madsen (Shannon Kane) is a successful graphic designer and Jake's soon to be ex-wife. She constantly needs to keep her husband's Hollywood lifestyle in check, and remind him that his personal life matters too. It's sometimes a struggle to keep his focus at home, especially when his attentions become even more divided by other interests especially since her father ended up in the hospital after a heart attack. She suspects Kelly and Jake did something while she was gone. Traci leaves Jake and goes back to Chicago to start her new job.
- Don Masters (Grayson McCouch) is a good-looking, successful surgeon, who also happens to be the father of Loren's high school nemesis, Adriana. He owns the private clinic where Nora and Ellie work together. He tends to mix business with pleasure. Killed in an explosion inside his clinic.
- Adriana Masters (Hunter King) is considered the popular and mean girl in school, who stops at nothing to make Loren's life miserable. She dates Melissa's brother, Phil, who helps take her mind off her issues with her father, Don. She believes that Eddie's songwriting contest was rigged, and thinks that Loren does not deserve any of the fame and attention she has been receiving from both Eddie and the press after winning the competition. She also has a plan to work with Chloe to take down Loren forever. She is pregnant and wants to keep the baby. In the season one finale, she and Phil become engaged.
- Phil Sanders (Robert Adamson) has no problem breaking rules to make things go his way. His sister, Melissa, sees right through his troublemaking, but his mother sees him as the perfect model of a child. His constant law-breaking lands him in trouble with his boss, Colorado, as well as the L.A. Police. He is dating Adriana, got her pregnant and is now engaged to her.
- Kelly (Yara Martinez) travels from New York to visit her best friend Traci, but develops an interest in the music business when she arrives. After demonstrating to Jake, who becomes her new boss, that she has talent in managing young stars, she goes about taking Loren's career into her own hands.
- Gus Sanders (Brian Letscher) is the head of the Sanders household. As the father to Melissa and Phil, he's got his hands full trying to keep the peace between everyone, while also hanging on to a secret that could disrupt his already tense home life.
- Lisa Sanders (Meredith Salenger) is Melissa and Phil's mother then turns out to be Melissa's aunt, often babying her trouble-making son, while keeping close tabs on her daughter. Keeping a harmonious home life proves to be difficult – especially when a part of her past threatens to come back to haunt them all.
- Ellie Moss (Merrin Dungey) is Nora's colleague at the clinic where she works. She's pleasant and funny when things are going well for her, but can become high strung and needy when she feels threatened or used. She leaves Don to die in the clinic moments before it explodes, and gets arrested for it.

=== Recurring ===
- Lily Park (Tina Huang) is an aggressive and pushy TV entertainment reporter who works hard to cultivate Hollywood friendships and connections, often walking a thin line between personal and professional matters.
- Colorado (Rick Otto) is a working-class guy who lurks on the wrong side of the law. He becomes an unfortunate role model to Phil, who comes to him looking for a job.
- Osborne Silver (James Franco) is a big, hot-shot movie producer who wants Eddie to star in a remake of Grease alongside his now ex-fiancée Chloe.
- Connor Morgan (Vince Jolivette) is Osborne Silver's loyal assistant.
- Cameron (Wyatt Nash) is a popular guy who becomes interested in Loren. He asks her to tutor him in physics to get her attention and later develops strong feelings for her, but soon realizes that Loren prefers Eddie over him. They remain friends.
- Ian (Eric Tiede) is Eddie's photographer best friend who tries to get Eddie to loosen up and go clubbing after he and Chloe break up.
- Grace (Brianne Davis) is a close friend of Max's who manages his bar and restaurant, Max's Place.
- Daphne Miller (Josie Davis) is an old friend of Max's who had a hit song back in the 1980s. Chloe asks her to keep Max Duran busy to keep him out of her love life, since Max disapproves of Eddie's relationship with her.
- Steven (Joe Reegan) is Jake's assistant and later Kelly's roommate.
- Beth (Megan Follows) is Lisa's estranged sister and Melissa's real mother. She and Melissa both share an interest in photography.
- Kim (Kelli Goss) is Adriana's friend to whom she confides her secrets and feelings.
- Lia and Jeremy (Danielle Savre and Colby Paul) are a sister and brother who lost their parents and are struggling to survive. They care for Eddie while he is recovering from his accident and try their best to not get the word out that Eddie is still alive to protect him from getting arrested. They hope to move forward with their own music career after assisting Eddie.
- Smith (David Lim) is Tyler's best friend, often referred to as Smitty. He is also an actor, and tries to talk sense into Tyler when Tyler vents to him about his problems.
- Joe Gable (James Shanklin) is Max's friend and private investigator who investigates Chloe's past at Max's request.

== Background ==
The original telenovela was first broadcast on Canal de las Estrellas in 1990, and later on Univision in the United States. Alcanzar una estrella won a TVyNovelas Award for "Best Telenovela of the Year" in 1991. The telenovela's success led to the making of a film, Más que alcanzar una estrella, and a sequel telenovela, Alcanzar una estrella II, starring Sasha Sokol and Ricky Martin.

TeenNick had already embraced the daily soap opera format starting with the tenth season of the Canadian teen drama Degrassi in 2010, airing four episodes weekly. The teen supernatural mystery series House of Anubis (based on a Dutch/Belgian series) followed in 2011, with serialized daily episodes airing on Nickelodeon (and later TeenNick). These successes led to Hollywood Heights, which would run for 16 weeks with, in the tradition of telenovelas, a resolution of storylines. Ed Martin of MediaPost.com called it "in every way a major experiment for Nick at Nite, from production to scheduling to publicity and promotion."

== Broadcast ==
Nick at Nite previewed the first episode of Hollywood Heights several times starting on June 11, 2012, before the 80-episode limited series officially premiered on June 18, 2012. The show initially ran every weeknight at 9 p.m. (EST), but halfway through the series on August 13, 2012, it was moved to Nick at Nite's sister channel TeenNick at 8 p.m. EST.

== Reception ==
Robert Lloyd of the Los Angeles Times noted that the series was produced by executive and creative personnel "whose combined credits include what seems to be every major network soap opera of the last 50 years as well as 21st-century reality soaps such as The Hills and The City." He wrote, "If Heights is not particularly novel—it is, after all, based on a series two decades old—neither does it reek of must and mildew. Nor do the musical performances seem contrived, or rather they seem authentically contrived, staged as they would be staged by a performer like Eddie, who deals in thumping aspirational party anthems." Lloyd added, "what I've seen, if not exactly appointment television for a person of my age and interests, is pretty appealing; by the standards of most other TV shows about teens and pop stars, it is well observed, well informed and (so far) plausible."

Joe Caramanica of The New York Times wrote, "Even though the melodrama, highly structured scripting and stilted camera shots are indebted to the telenovela form, Hollywood Heights owes the most to the rat-tat-tat rhythms of Gilmore Girls." Of James Franco's performance Caramanica wrote, "Mr. Franco chews more than his share of scenery, which turns out to be a necessary strategy. In an environment like this, in which all the performances have soft edges, and no one is steering the scenes too aggressively, acting out is the only sort of acting that gets noticed. His frazzled energy isn’t realistic but is instead fantastical and a running commentary on the stiltedness of the rest of the proceedings."

Ed Martin of MediaPost.com noted that creatively the series "so far has been a bit on the safe and sterile side, even more than Degrassi and certainly more than the often quite edgy fare on ABC Family." Variety's Brian Lowry wrote that though Hollywood Heights was "tailored to [Nickelodeon's] demo with a musical component and teen-tempting leads ... For a show with a pop undercurrent that proclaims itself 'sizzling', Heights is pretty tepid and lacks a hit song’s most basic element: A catchy hook." Suggesting that daily episodes were difficult to reasonably keep up with, Caramanica still called it "comfort TV with narrative soul." Martin agreed that daily episodes "may be too much of a demand to place on potential viewers in the new media world of ever-increasing competition and ever-shrinking attention spans."
