= Marque Richardson =

American actor (born 1985)

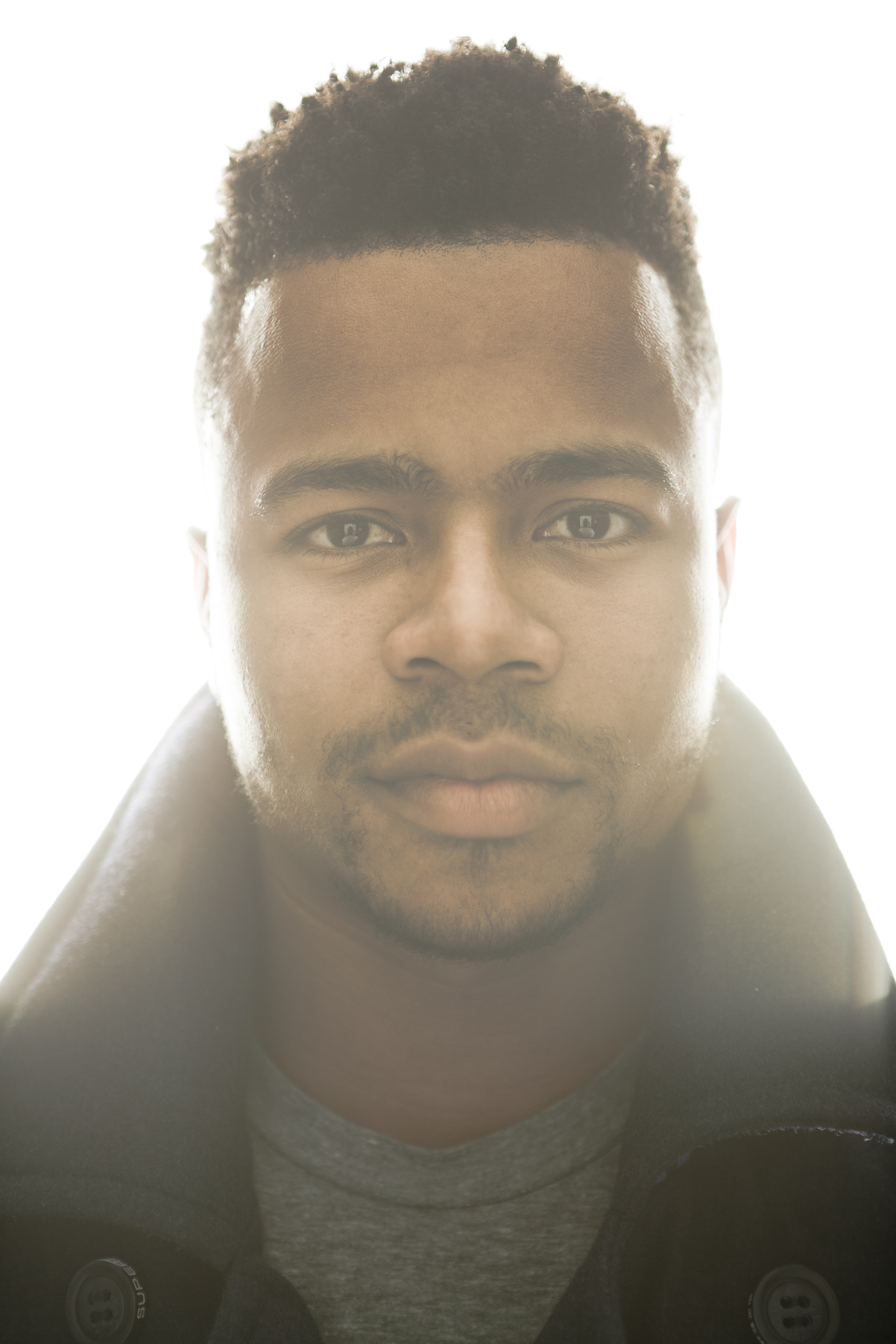
- Born: Marque Richardson Jr. October 23, 1985 (age 40); San Diego, California, U.S.
- Other name: Marque Richardson II
- Occupations: Actor, Producer
- Years active: 2001–present

Marque Richardson Jr. (born October 23, 1985) is an American actor.

== Early life ==
Richardson was born in San Diego, California in the U.S., in a naval hospital. Both parents served in the United States Navy. His father hails from Detroit, Michigan in the U.S., and his mother from Newport News, Virginia in the U.S. The elder of two siblings, he began his acting career starring in commercials at the age of four. Having moved around frequently, he was primarily raised in Bellflower, California in the U.S.

Balancing school life with entertainment, Richardson was a scholar-athlete at Mayfair High School in Lakewood, California. In 2007, he graduated from the University of Southern California with degrees in business, Public Policy, Planning & Management on full scholarship from the Bill & Melinda Gates Foundation.

After graduation Richardson interned at Overbrook Entertainment to gain insight of life behind the camera.

== Career ==
One of Richardson's first television roles was a guest appearance on The Bernie Mac Show as Tyrone, aka "Lemon-Lyme". He has also appeared in ER, 7th Heaven, Lincoln Heights and Rules of Engagement. He starred in the web series My Alibi. He had a recurring role on USA Networks' The Starter Wife.

He won a role in Joseph Kahn's horror/comedy film Detention, released by Sony in 2012. He most notably scored recurring roles as Kenneth on Seasons 5 and 6 of HBO's hit True Blood, and, in 2013, as Mark Gage in the HBO series The Newsroom.

In 2014, Richardson starred in the critically acclaimed film Dear White People, a satire that won the U.S. Dramatic Special Jury Prize "for the arrival of an exciting new voice in American cinema" at Sundance. The film was theatrically released by Lionsgate / Roadside Attractions. He also reprises his starring role in Dear White People, the "Netflix Original" TV show based on the film.

== Personal life ==
Richardson is a strong advocate of community service and has been involved with various global service projects. In 2005, he traveled to Khao Lak, Thailand to provide relief after the area's devastating tsunami in December, 2004. He also worked with Habitat for Humanity to build homes in Baton Rouge, Louisiana (post Hurricane Katrina) and Retalhuleu, Guatemala. In 2018 he partnered to form The Jordan Edwards Memorial Scholarship Fund, an endowment fund that awards scholarships to honor the legacy of Jordan Edwards, a child who was murdered by a police officer in Dallas, Texas.

== Filmography ==
=== Film ===
Year	Title	Role	Notes
2001	Flossin	Malik	
2008	Superhero Movie	Xavier's Older Son	
2009	Crossing Over	Disparaging Teen #1	
2010	The 41-Year-Old Virgin	Blaqguy	
2011	Detention	Toby T.	
2011	The Exam	Dr. Wang	Short
2011	The Blind Side	Ryan (voice)	Short
2011	The HABO (Help-A-Brotha-Out) Institute	Black Guy	Short
2012	A Real Black Horror	Justice	Short
2013	TOO LEGIT	MC Hammer	Short
2013	Browsers	Gabe Blackman	TV movie
2013	Wiener Dog Nationals	Dirk	
2014	Dear White People	Reggie	
2014	I Like You a Latte	Michael	Short
2014	Jingle Dead II	Santa Claus	Short
2015	Strays	JP	Short
2016	Dating Daisy	Marcus	
2016	All the Way	Bob Moses	TV movie
2017	Pick Up	Ben	Short
2017	Legacy	Floyd	Short
2018	Step Sisters	Kevin	
2020	Inheritance	Scott Monroe	
2020	Antebellum	Nick DeWall	

=== Television ===
Year	Title	Role	Notes
2006	7th Heaven	Todd	Episode: "Got MLK?"
2006	The Bernie Mac Show	Tyrone	Episode: "What Would Jason Do?"
2007	Unfabulous	Sailor Waiter	Episode: "The Best Trip Ever: Part 1 & 2"
2008	ER	Saga	Episode: "The Book of Abby"
2008	Lincoln Heights	Looter	Episode: "The Ground Beneath Our Feet"
2008	Chocolate News	Soldier #1	Episode: "Episode #1.8"
2008	The Starter Wife	Campbell	Recurring cast
2008–09	My Alibi	Justin Walker	Main cast
2009	Rules of Engagement	Catcher	Episode: "Old Timer's Day"
2011	Community	Special Agent Glenn Keenlan	Episode: "Intro to Political Science"
2011	N.C.I.S.	Navy Seaman Joey Elson	Episode: "Two-Faced"
2012	The Middle	Nick	Episode: "Halloween III: The Driving"
2012	All the Wrong Notes	Kanye	Episode: "Kanye Baby"
2012–13	True Blood	Kenneth	Recurring cast: season 4–5
2013	Anger Management	Logan	Episode: "Charlie Lets Kate Take Charge"
2013	The Hustle	Cameron	Recurring cast
2013	Run DMZ	Tito	Episode: "Episode #1.3 & #1.6"
2013	The Newsroom	Mark Gage	Recurring cast: season 2
2014	Brooklyn Nine-Nine	Brian Jenson	Episode: "Full Boyle"
2016	Rosewood	Bennie	Episode: "Eddie & the Empire State of Mind"
2017–21	Dear White People	Reggie Green	Recurring cast: season 1, main cast: season 2–4
2021	Tell Me Your Secrets	Tom Johnston	Recurring cast
2021	Genius: Aretha	King Curtis	Recurring cast: season 3
2023	Unprisoned	Mal	Main cast
2024	Dancing for the Devil: The 7M TikTok Cult	Himself	
