= Bad Hair (2020 film) =

2020 American comedy horror film

- Official release poster
- Directed by: Justin Simien
- Written by: Justin Simien
- Produced by: Justin Simien; Julia Lebedev; Angel Lopez; Eddie Vaisman
- Starring: Elle Lorraine; Jay Pharoah; Lena Waithe; Kelly Rowland; Laverne Cox; Chanté Adams; James Van Der Beek; Usher Raymond IV; Blair Underwood; Vanessa Williams
- Cinematography: Topher Osborn
- Edited by: Phillip J. Bartell; Kelly Matsumoto
- Music by: Kris Bowers
- Production companies: Sight Unseen; Endeavor Content; FilmNation Entertainment
- Distributed by: Hulu; Neon
- Release dates: January 23, 2020 (Sundance); October 16, 2020 (United States)
- Running time: 102 minutes
- Country: United States
- Language: English
- Budget: $8.9 million

Bad Hair is a 2020 American satirical black horror comedy film written, directed, and produced by Justin Simien. The film stars Elle Lorraine, Jay Pharoah, Lena Waithe, Kelly Rowland, Laverne Cox, Chanté Adams, James Van Der Beek, Usher Raymond IV, Blair Underwood, and Vanessa Williams.

Bad Hair had its world premiere at the 2020 Sundance Film Festival on January 23, 2020. It was released in a limited release on October 16, 2020, by Neon, followed by digital streaming on Hulu on October 23, 2020. The film received moderately positive reviews from critics.

== Plot ==
In the late 1970s, a young Anna attempts to relax her hair with the help of her older cousin Linda. Her hair has a bad reaction to the cream and leaves a permanent scar on the back of her head.

Years later, in 1989, an adult Anna is an assistant at Culture, a television station featuring African-American music artists. Aspiring to move up in the industry, she is devastated when her mentor, Edna, the current head of programming, is ousted by the station's owner, Grant Madison, and replaced with former supermodel Zora. Anna suggests her idea to expand the station's reach by diversifying the Culture VJs' style and showcasing a live music video countdown show. Impressed, Zora takes her on as her assistant but demands that Anna changes from her natural Afro-textured hair to a weave to fit the station's new image. Zora gives her the address of her upscale hair salon, Virgie's. Anna returns to her aunt and uncle’s house, and her aunt gives her enough money to have her hair done while her uncle lends her a book on African American slave lore. She goes to the salon, where the receptionist tells her the appointment won’t be for months so Anna approaches a hairdresser (Virgie herself) and makes a heartfelt plea. Virgie agrees to do her hair at the end of the day. While waiting, Anna has a nightmare. The process is painful and Anna faints. Virgie gives Anna a pink bottle of hair product and tells her never to let the weave get wet.

Anna later runs into her idol, Sandra, whose weave got wet in the studio. Anna compliments her and tells her how much of a fan she is.

Anna's new hair helps her succeed, getting her noticed by an old work flame, Julius. She expresses the desire to become the host of the countdown. Despite the VJs' reluctance to change to a more commercial appearance, Anna convinces them to sport the new weaves. She soon begins to notice strange phenomena such as the hair moving on its own, intense hunger pangs, and nightmares of hair being cut on a plantation. When her drunk landlord, Mr. Tannen, attempts to rape her, Anna's hair becomes active, and she stabs him. It then surges into the wound and drains Tannen of his blood, killing him. Anna is horrified.

At a party, Zora asks cryptic questions about whether Anna is still using the hair product, leading her to suspect that Zora is similarly afflicted. She is confronted by Edna, who is disappointed by Anna selling out Culture's image and criticizes her weave as indicative of her lack of integrity. Anna is crushed when she learns that Zora has made herself host instead, and has been having an affair with Julius. When Anna later has sex with Julius, the hair possesses her, and she angrily stabs him. The hair feeds on his blood.

Terrified, Anna flees to a natural hair salon to have the weave removed and runs into Edna. She tearfully apologizes for disappointing her, but as the stylist attempts to cut her weave out, the hair kills everyone in the salon. Anna recalls an African American slave lore tale called "The Moss Haired Girl" from her Black studies professor uncle’s book. A slave fashions a wig from tree moss to replicate the straight hair of her masters but finds the moss is actually the hair of dead witches who possess the woman. Frantic, Anna finds that Zora and others who received weaves from Virgie are possessed. Zora attempts to cut her hair off and is killed. Now fully controlling Zora and the others, the hair chases Anna through the building. Trapped in a sound booth, she notices a gun-lighter under the desk. She lights a cigarette in preparation for her death but spots a sprinkler and triggers it with the lighter, causing water to soak her and the others, weakening her hair and allowing her to cut it off.

As she moves back into her uncle and aunt's home, Anna learns the hair product is made with pig's blood, intended to help feed the hair. She sees new advertisements for Culture featuring Zora, who survived and is now fully possessed by the witches' hair. She finishes reading the story of the Moss Haired Girl, which tells of the plantation master's descendants continuing to farm the hair, knowing of its controlling abilities. A truck with the same logo as the tree moss illustration drives out to a plantation, where it loads up boxes of hair, and unloads the corpses of the hair's victims. The plantation owner is revealed to be Culture station owner, Grant Madison, and the tree, rife with writhing hair, grows nearby. Anna's cousin Linda announces she managed to get an appointment at Virgie's to have a weave put in and Anna chases after her to stop her.

== Cast ==
- Elle Lorraine as Anna Bludso
  - Zaria Kelley as Young Anna
- Vanessa Williams as Zora Choice
- Jay Pharoah as Julius
- Lena Waithe as Brook-Lynne
- Yaani King as Sista Soul
- Blair Underwood as Amos Bludso
- Laverne Cox as Virgie
- Michelle Hurd as Maxine Bludso
- Judith Scott as Edna
- Robin Thede as Denise
- Ashley Blaine Featherson as Rosalyn
- Steve Zissis as Baxter Tannen
- MC Lyte as Coral
- Kelly Rowland as Sandra
- James Van Der Beek as Grant Madison
- Usher as Germane D.
- Chanté Adams as Linda Bludso
- Dahéli Hall as Sheryl
- Moses Storm as Executive Justin
- Jon Gabrus as Valet
- Nicole Byer as Gina
- Justin Simien as Reggie Watson

== Production ==
In August 2017, it was announced Justin Simien would direct, write, and produce the film, with Oren Moverman serving as an executive producer under his Sight Unseen banner.

== Release ==
It had its world premiere at the 2020 Sundance Film Festival on January 23, 2020. Shortly after, Hulu acquired distribution rights to the film for over $8 million, beating out studios including Lionsgate and Netflix. It was released in a limited release on October 16, 2020, by Neon, followed by digital streaming on October 23, 2020.

== Soundtrack ==
The score was composed and arranged by Kris Bowers. The original soundtrack featured a 27-track project that was inspired by the new jack swing. Three songs were co-written with Justin Simien and Kelly Rowland, who also performed the tracks.

== Reception ==
On review aggregator Rotten Tomatoes, the film holds an approval rating of 62% based on 85 reviews, with an average rating of 6.1/10. The website's critics consensus reads: "Bad Hair's unwieldy ambitions are easy to respect – even if the film's tonal jumble and uneven execution are impossible to ignore." On Metacritic, the film has a weighted average score of 61 out of 100 based on 23 critics, indicating "generally favorable" reviews.
