= Step Sisters =

2018 dance film directed by Charles Stone III

- Official release poster
- Directed by: Charles Stone III
- Written by: Chuck Hayward
- Produced by: Matt Alvarez; Simon Horsman; Benjamin Jones; Jeffrey Soros; Lena Waithe
- Starring: Megalyn Echikunwoke; Lyndon Smith; Eden Sher; Marque Richardson; Matt McGorry; Naturi Naughton
- Cinematography: Christopher Baffa
- Edited by: Matt Friedman
- Music by: Patrick Denny; Laura Karpman; Raphael Saadiq
- Production company: Los Angeles Media Fund
- Distributed by: Netflix
- Release date: January 19, 2018
- Running time: 108 minutes
- Country: United States
- Language: English
- Budget: $10 million

Step Sisters is a 2018 dance comedy film directed by Charles Stone III. It stars Megalyn Echikunwoke as a Black sorority girl who agrees to teach the art of Greek stepping to a house of party-obsessed white sorority sisters.

== Plot ==
Jamilah is an ambitious college student. She's president of her Black sorority, captain of the highly regarded step team, a trusted liaison to the college dean, and has plans to attend Harvard Law School.

But after her school's reputation is tarnished by a band of hard-partying white sorority girls, Jamilah is forcibly enlisted to help set things right. She's tasked with not only teaching these girls how to step, but also helping them to win a dance competition.

== Cast ==
- Megalyn Echikunwoke as Jamilah
- Lyndon Smith as Danielle
- Eden Sher as Beth
- Sheryl Lee Ralph as Yvonne Bishop
- Gage Golightly as Libby
- Alessandra Torresani as Amber
- Nia Jervier as Saundra
- Marque Richardson as Kevin
- Robert Curtis Brown as Dean Berman
- Matt McGorry as Dane
- Naturi Naughton as Aisha
- L. Warren Young as Langston Bishop
- Ashlee Brie Gillum as Cheryl
- Jene Moore as Alani

== Release ==
The film's main roles were cast in May 2016. The film was scheduled to be released on March 31, 2017 by Broad Green Pictures. However, it was ultimately pulled from the schedule. Shortly after, Netflix acquired distribution rights to the film, following Broad Green dropping the film, and it was released by Netflix on January 19, 2018.

== Critical reception ==
On Rotten Tomatoes the film has an approval rating of 22% from nine reviews.

== See also ==
- List of black films of the 2010s
