= Dear White People (TV series) =

2017 American television series

- Genre: Comedy drama Satire
- Created by: Justin Simien
- Based on: Dear White People by Justin Simien
- Showrunner: Yvette Lee Bowser
- Starring: Logan Browning; Brandon P. Bell; DeRon Horton; Antoinette Robertson; John Patrick Amedori; Ashley Blaine Featherson; Marque Richardson; Jemar Michael; Courtney Sauls
- Narrated by: Giancarlo Esposito
- Composer: Kris Bowers
- Country of origin: United States
- Original language: English
- No. of seasons: 4
- No. of episodes: 40

Production
- Executive producers: Justin Simien; Yvette Lee Bowser; Stephanie Allain; Julia Lebedev; Nastaran Dibai; Jaclyn Moore
- Cinematography: Jeffrey Waldron
- Running time: 21–39 minutes
- Production companies: SisterLee Productions; Culture Machine; Code Red; Homegrown Pictures; Roadside Attractions; Lionsgate Television

Original release
- Network: Netflix
- Release: April 28, 2017 – September 22, 2021

Dear White People is an American comedy-drama television series on Netflix that follows several black college students at an Ivy League institution (the fictional Winchester University), touching on issues surrounding modern American race relations from a politically progressive perspective. It is based on and a continuation of the 2014 film of the same name. The film's writer and director, Justin Simien, returned to write and direct episodes of the series. This series stars Logan Browning, Brandon P. Bell, DeRon Horton, and Antoinette Robertson. With a few exceptions, generally season finales, each episode focuses on one particular character. The series premiered on April 28, 2017. On October 2, 2019, the series was renewed for its fourth and final season, which was released on September 22, 2021.

== Cast and characters ==
=== Main ===
- Logan Browning as Samantha "Sam" White, a college student trying to wake people up to the social issues still at play at Winchester. Browning replaces Tessa Thompson, who portrayed the character in the film.
- Brandon P. Bell as Troy Fairbanks; Bell reprises his role from the film.
- DeRon Horton as Lionel Higgins, a highly intelligent school reporter with some emotional issues. Horton replaces Tyler James Williams, who portrayed the character in the film.
- Antoinette Robertson as Colandrea "Coco" Conners, an ambitious black woman who antagonizes Samantha. Robertson replaces Teyonah Parris, who portrayed the character in the film.
- John Patrick Amedori as Gabe Mitchell, Samantha's main love interest. Amedori replaces Justin Dobies, who portrayed the character in the film.
- Ashley Blaine Featherson as Joelle Brooks; Featherson reprises her role from the film (the character is credited as "Curls" in the film).
- Marque Richardson as Reggie Green; Richardson reprises his role from the film (seasons 2–4; recurring season 1).
- Jemar Michael as Al Lucas; Michael reprises his role from the film (the character is credited as "Smoothe" in the film) (season 4; recurring seasons 1–3).
- Courtney Sauls as Brooke Morgan; Sauls reprises her role from the film (the character is credited as "Wild" in the film) (season 4; recurring seasons 1–3).

=== Recurring ===
- Giancarlo Esposito as Dr. Edward Ruskins / The Narrator, a former professor at Winchester who serves as the narrator for the first three seasons (seasons 1–3)
- DJ Blickenstaff as Silvio, Lionel's boss at the school newspaper The Independent (seasons 1–3)
- Caitlin Carver as Muffy Tuttle, one of Coco's friends and previously a political rival of Troy
- Ally Maki as Ikumi (seasons 1, 3)
- Obba Babatundé as Dean Fairbanks; Babatundé replaces Dennis Haysbert, who portrayed the character in the film.
- Brandon Black as Pastor Kordell
- Wyatt Nash as Kurt Fletcher, editor of Pastiche, Winchester's satirical comedy magazine (seasons 1–3); Nash replaces Kyle Gallner, who portrayed the character in the film.
- Erich Lane as Clifton
- Sheridan Pierce as Abigail, the only female member of the Pastiche writing staff
- Nicholas Anthony Reid as James
- John Rubinstein as President Fletcher, Kurt's father (seasons 1, 4). Rubinstein replaces Peter Syvertsen, who portrayed the character in the film.
- Nia Long as Professor Neika Hobbs (season 1); a bisexual college professor who is cheating on her lesbian fiancée with Troy.
- Nia Jervier as Kelsey Phillips, Coco's Trinidadian lesbian roommate; Jervier reprises her role from the film (the character is credited as "Coco's Friend" in the film) (seasons 1–3)
- Jeremy Tardy as Rashid Mburu, a Nigerian student who is in love with Joelle (seasons 1–3)
- Francia Raisa as Vanessa (season 1)
- Dahéli Hall as Dereca
- Alex Alcheh as Milo (seasons 1, 3)
- Lena Waithe as P. Ninny; Waithe was a producer for the film (season 2)
- Blair Underwood as Moses Brown (season 3)
- Quei Tann as Genifer (seasons 3–4)
- Wade F. Wilson as Michael (seasons 3–4)
- Joi Liaye as Iesha Vital (season 4)
- Judith Scott as Helen Freeman (season 4)
- Rome Flynn as David (season 4)
- Wendie Malick as Geraldine Bernadette (season 4)

=== Guest ===
- Brant Daugherty as Thane Lockwood
- Tessa Thompson as Rikki Carter (Thompson originally played Samantha White in the film.)
- Tyler James Williams as Carson Rhodes (Williams originally played Lionel Higgins in the film.)
- Brandon Alter as George; Alter reprises his role from the film.
- Wendy Raquel Robinson as Tina White
- Yvette Nicole Brown as Evelyn Connors

== Episodes ==
=== Series overview ===
Volume	Episodes	Originally released
1	10	April 28, 2017
2	10	May 4, 2018
3	10	August 2, 2019
4	10	September 22, 2021

=== Volume 1 (2017) ===
No. overall	No. in season	Title	Directed by	Written by	Featured character(s)	Original release date
1	1	"Chapter I"	Justin Simien	Justin Simien	Samantha	April 28, 2017
Samantha White films a "Dear Black People" party hosted by Pastiche, a student magazine group hosted by white students. Holding a black student caucus to discuss the matter, her friends learn she is dating Gabe, a white student and the teaching assistant from her class. The fellow black students start losing faith in her awareness and she is torn about what to do. Lionel talks to her, and tells her he has the truth of who really invited the DBP partygoers. After her radio show was replaced, Samantha barges into the studio and rants on-air about the racism on campus, confessing to hacking into the Pastiche account to send invites to prove something; she also apologizes to Gabe.
2	2	"Chapter II"	Justin Simien	Justin Simien	Lionel	April 28, 2017
A timid Lionel learned of Pastiche's Dear Black People party from a randomized invitation, and informed the other Black student groups, who shut it down. After writing the article about the party, his editor points out the flaws of his piece but had it front page because it would sell; encouraging Lionel to find more to the story and improve upon what he already found out. This leads Lionel to following breadcrumbs, which proves Samantha hacked Pastiche's account to send invites; Lionel secretly forewarns Sam, who then confesses on the school radio. Getting a haircut from roommate Troy, Lionel opens up that he's gay.
3	3	"Chapter III"	Tina Mabry	Chuck Hayward	Troy	April 28, 2017
Troy Fairbanks, son of the Dean, is running for student body president. While Troy is at a donors party, Lionel texts him about the Dear Black People party. Seeing this, Troy has the campus police peacefully shut it down. Troy brings Lionel along to see his campaign trail, and Kurt (Pastiche's editor) asks Troy for help to get people to stop hating him, but is brushed off. After Troy spends the night with Professor Neika Hobbs, come morning he won the election. At his dorm, Troy receives blackmail from Kurt, forcing his hand. Meanwhile, star running back Thane Lockwood dies at a party.
4	4	"Chapter IV"	Tina Mabry	Njeri Brown	Coco	April 28, 2017
In flashbacks, Coco and Samantha had a starting friendship which broke apart from differing ideas on their social groups; Samantha joined BSU while Coco left and joined a sorority. When trying to get with Troy, Coco finds he was dating Samantha at the time. Today, Colandrea "Coco" Conners identifies the least with black identity compared to Samantha, and even defends the Dear Black People party. Confronting Samantha at her radio booth, Coco points out her academic leniency is because she looks more white than herself, whereas she would have been more punished. At the Pegasus Party, Coco gleefully locks out the Sorority leaders she once tried to impress.
5	5	"Chapter V"	Barry Jenkins	Chuck Hayward & Jaclyn Moore	Reggie	April 28, 2017
Reggie creates an app to measure how woke someone is, secretly to impress Samantha, now needing an investor. At Thane's memorial with Al, Rashid and Joelle, they make a new friend in an Asian girl called Ikumi. After seeing a low-quality movie with Lionel, the group point out the racial stereotypes in cinema. Having a late dinner, Joelle and Reggie argue over Reggie's cyberstalking Samantha, but resolve it by going to a party at Addison's house. When Addison repeats "nigger" from a rap song, a drunk Reggie calls him out on it and begins an argument; with Kurt fueling matters. When someone bumps Reggie into Addison, cops arrive just then and demand to see ID. As Reggie refuses, the cops draw arms on him, forcing compliance. After seeing Reggie's ID, everyone is told to leave, leaving Reggie traumatized.
6	6	"Chapter VI"	Steven Tsuchida	Leann Bowen	Samantha	April 28, 2017
Samantha berates campus police for drawing a gun on Reggie at the party, while the BSU have a heated debate over campus police and how to make a change. Al calls for the snitch who called the cops found, while Coco calls for managing 'blackness' having grown up in Chicago. Kurt approaches Samantha for something to stop the racial tension, but is shot down. Reggie misses his appointment with the Dean about the matter, so Samantha organizes a blockade of the Student Pep Rally. By meeting Gabe's friends for coffee, Samantha is reminded that the reason Reggie missed his meeting is because he has been made a public victim. After tracking Reggie down, they go to an open mic cafe where Reggie reads his poetry about that experience. Heading home, Reggie opens up about how he sees greatness in Samantha.
7	7	"Chapter VII"	Nisha Ganatra	Jaclyn Moore	Gabe	April 28, 2017
Gabe goes to Samantha's room to check on her after the Pep Rally blockade fails. Samantha tells him she was taking care or Reggie, and that causes Gabe to suspect something happened between the two. At the next black student caucus Troy announces that a town hall will be held on the issue, which the BSU is quick to call for it to be protested not only by black students, but by all marginalized groups on campus. Joelle and Gabe are tasked with gathering support from these groups and along the way he asks her for advice regarding his doubts with Samantha. Gabe then admits to calling the cops at the Addison party to Joelle. The next morning the Independent releases the audio of Gabe's 911 call which Samantha, as well as the rest of the black students take badly and Gabe no longer welcome with them.
8	8	"Chapter VIII"	Charlie McDowell	Nastaran Dibai	Lionel	April 28, 2017
Following Gabe's ostracization from Armstrong-Parker, Lionel sits down with Silvio pitches the idea for a cover on Troy. Silvio delegates the assignment to Brooke and tasks Lionel with a fluff piece. Lionel ignores Silvio, tags with Troy to a bar and learns of the pressure Troy feels from being a 'model minority figure'. Later that night in the Independent offices, Silvio tells Lionel off for disobeying his instructions and being absent when Samantha clashed yet again with Pastiche's editors at the parade. With no paper to back the BSU up on the issue, Pastiche has a free pass to spin the events in their favor. Lionel decides to write up his original article anyway about what he has learnt over the course of the evening, effectively painting an image of Troy as a 'Mouthpiece and a mascot".
9	9	"Chapter IX"	Nisha Ganatra	Chuck Hayward & Jaclyn Moore	Coco	April 28, 2017
Coco confronts Lionel on his article, only to be surprised by Troy who seems completely fine with the confession being public. Troy and Coco are invited to attend a party at the home of the Hancocks, a wealthy family who financially support Winchester. While discussing the upcoming town hall, the Hancocks express a desire to Troy, Coco and the Dean to see Armstrong-Parker integrated or risk losing their funding. Coco also finds out about Troy's, now over, affair with Professor Neika Hobbs. Coco, behind Troy's back, goes to Samantha to see if she can get her to drop the protest and fails to do so. Troy happens to show up and sees this, later breaking the truth to Coco that he knows she's only with him because of what he represents and that he no longer wants to see her.
10	10	"Chapter X"	Justin Simien	Justin Simien	none	April 28, 2017
The final episode of the first season focuses on all the main cast rather than one as all previous episodes have. While Reggie goes to read his poem on the campus radio, Samantha and Gabe talk outside the studio. Samantha apologies for not having his back after the publication of the 911 call, but Gabe confronts about her having slept with Reggie and that he doesn't know if he is willing to forgive her for it. Shortly after Lionel arrives and learns about the intent to integrate Armstrong-Parker through Samantha. After digging deeper, he learns that the Hancocks have pushed similar policy before, however when he presents this to Silvio he is once again shot down, this time because the Hancocks are the founders and primary sponsor of the 'Independent'. As night falls and the town hall is set to start, it becomes apparent that not only the BSU, but also students who believe Thane's death has been overshadowed arrive to protest the town hall. Coco, in a grab for power, locks Troy outside with the protesters and takes control of the town hall. As the final question rolls around, Coco feels pressured and passes the mic onto Lionel, who proceeds to surprise everyone when he publicly discloses the universities shady dealings with the Hancocks and having uploaded an article to the Independent's site with the proof. At the same time, a group of students led by Pastiche's staff arrive with the intent to show solidarity for the campus police. The combination of this all finally pushes all protesters past a boiling point and Troy, sick of being a puppet, grabs a shovel, smashes a glass pane and is promptly arrested for destruction of property by campus police.

=== Volume 2 (2018) ===
No. overall	No. in season	Title	Directed by	Written by	Featured character(s)	Original release date
11	1	"V2: Chapter I"	Justin Simien	Justin Simien	Samantha	May 4, 2018
In the wake of the town hall protest, Sam finds herself at the center of an alt-right backlash and goes to war with a social media troll.
12	2	"V2: Chapter II"	Kevin Bray	Chuck Hayward	Reggie	May 4, 2018
Reggie suffers flashbacks from being held at gunpoint by campus police (who assumed he "didn't belong" at university until a white student intervened to "vouch" for him). Support comes from an unexpected figure.
13	3	"V2: Chapter III"	Charlie McDowell	Justin Simien	Lionel	May 4, 2018
Lionel party-hops with Silvio and discovers a new friend, Wesley.
14	4	"V2: Chapter IV"	Kimberly Peirce	Njeri Brown	Coco	May 4, 2018
Coco makes a life-changing decision, with the support of an unexpected friend.
15	5	"V2: Chapter V"	Salli Richardson-Whitfield	Leann Bowen	Joelle	May 4, 2018
Joelle meets her competitor for top-grade in anatomy and they're not at all what she expected.
16	6	"V2: Chapter VI"	Justin Simien	Jaclyn Moore & Chuck Hayward	Lionel	May 4, 2018
Lionel must juggle his personal life and faux-professional obligations while helping Brooke hunt down the mysterious alt-right internet troll. All they find is the shocking fate of Sorbet, Kelsey's stolen medically prescribed comfort dog, but the evening holds a few more surprises for Lionel.
17	7	"V2: Chapter VII"	Steven Tsuchida	Yvette Lee Bowser & Nastaran Dibai	Troy	May 4, 2018
Troy finds his voice, comedic and otherwise, by partially confronting the pain he's caused others – Reggie, Sam and Coco.
18	8	"V2: Chapter VIII"	Justin Simien	Jaclyn Moore	Gabe	May 4, 2018
Gabe interviews Sam for his documentary film, "Am I Racist?" Feelings simmer as the former lovers engage in personal and heated discussion about the fine line between using white privilege to dismantle white supremacy and the self-aggrandizement of the white savior complex. What does their passionate exchange and bad news for Sam entail for their relationship?
19	9	"V2: Chapter IX"	Janicza Bravo	Nastaran Dibai & Yvette Lee Bowser	Samantha	May 4, 2018
Sam, Joelle and Coco drive to Sam's childhood home in the suburbs for an event that brings the whole family together. Sam confronts her mother, Tina, about withholding information. Mother and daughter reconcile over a letter, while Joelle and Coco reconcile over cosmetics.
20	10	"V2: Chapter X"	Justin Simien	Njeri Brown & Justin Simien	none	May 4, 2018
As Rikki Carter arrives on campus, Reggie and Joelle finally come to an agreement over their relationship, prompting Sam and Gabe to reach an accord as well. Sam's confrontation with Rikki doesn't go as planned, but thanks to Coco and her most unexpected of allies, neither does Rikki's speech. Lionel and Sam try and join the mysterious Order of X.

=== Volume 3 (2019) ===
No. overall	No. in season	Title	Directed by	Written by	Featured character(s)	Original release date
21	1	"Vol. 3: Chapter I"	Justin Simien	Jaclyn Moore	Al	August 2, 2019
22	2	"Vol. 3: Chapter II"	Marta Cunningham	Leann Bowen	Joelle	August 2, 2019
23	3	"Vol. 3: Chapter III"	Kimberly Peirce	Justin Simien	Samantha	August 2, 2019
24	4	"Vol. 3: Chapter IV"	Justin Tipping	Chuck Hayward	Troy	August 2, 2019
25	5	"Vol. 3: Chapter V"	Cheryl Dunye	Nastaran Dibai	Coco	August 2, 2019
26	6	"Vol. 3: Chapter VI"	Steven Tsuchida	Chuck Hayward & Jaclyn Moore	Gabe	August 2, 2019
27	7	"Vol. 3: Chapter VII"	Tiffany Johnson	Leann Bowen & Steven J. Kung	Lionel	August 2, 2019
28	8	"Vol. 3: Chapter VIII"	Sam Bailey	Njeri Brown	Brooke	August 2, 2019
29	9	"Vol. 3: Chapter IX"	Salli Richardson-Whitfield	Njeri Brown & Nastaran Dibai	none	August 2, 2019
30	10	"Vol. 3: Chapter X"	Justin Simien	Justin Simien	Reggie	August 2, 2019

=== Volume 4 (2021) ===
No. overall	No. in season	Title	Directed by	Written by	Featured character(s)	Original release date
31	1	"Volume Four: Chapter I"	Justin Simien	Justin Simien	Lionel	September 22, 2021
32	2	"Volume Four: Chapter II"	Justin Simien	Leann Bowen	Joelle	September 22, 2021
33	3	"Volume Four: Chapter III"	Sam Bailey	Steven J. Kung	Troy	September 22, 2021
34	4	"Volume Four: Chapter IV"	Sam Bailey	Sam Bailey	Coco	September 22, 2021
35	5	"Volume Four: Chapter V"	Justin Simien	Edgar Momplaisir	TBA	September 22, 2021
36	6	"Volume Four: Chapter VI"	Justin Simien	Natalia Temesgen	Samantha, Lionel	September 22, 2021
37	7	"Volume Four: Chapter VII"	Tiffany Johnson	Dahéli Hall	TBA	September 22, 2021
38	8	"Volume Four: Chapter VIII"	Tiffany Johnson	Ean Weslynn	TBA	September 22, 2021
39	9	"Volume Four: Chapter IX"	Justin Simien	Jaclyn Moore	TBA	September 22, 2021
40	10	"Volume Four: Chapter X"	Justin Simien	Justin Simien	TBA	September 22, 2021

== Production ==
Netflix initially ordered ten 30-minute episodes from Simien and Lionsgate, which distributed the film. TV writer Yvette Lee Bowser, creator of Living Single, joined the series as showrunner and executive producer. The first season was released on April 28, 2017. On June 30, 2017, Netflix renewed the series for a second season, which premiered on May 4, 2018. On June 21, 2018, the series was renewed for a third season, which was released on August 2, 2019. On October 2, 2019, the series was renewed for a fourth and final season. Simien promoted longtime series writer Jaclyn Moore to co-showrunner for this concluding chapter, which features a significant musical element. The final season was released on September 22, 2021.

== Reception ==
The initial trailer for the TV show attracted some angry responses, with the series being accused by some Twitter users of being racist towards white people; they called for a boycott of Netflix. The YouTube trailer for the series received more dislikes than likes. Series creator Justin Simien responded positively to the backlash, saying it reiterated the point of the series and brought more attention to it as well. Lead actress Logan Browning noted that many of the critics who gave the show rave reviews were white.

Actor Jeremy Tardy announced he would not be returning for the fourth season, citing racism allegations against Lionsgate. Specifically, Tardy and fellow actors were presented unequal pay and negotiation powers for their fourth-season roles.

=== Critical response ===
The series has been met with critical acclaim. On Rotten Tomatoes, season one has a 91% approval rating based on 55 reviews from critics but has a 61% approval rating from the audience. The website's critics consensus reads, "Timely, provocative, and sharply written, Dear White People is an entertaining blend of social commentary and incisive humor." On Metacritic, the season has a weighted average score of 85 out of 100, based on 21 reviews. Peter Debruge, writing for Variety, praised the show's writing, directing, social commentary, and cast. The New York Times praised the show's examination of concerns such as appropriation, assimilation, and conflict.

On Rotten Tomatoes, season two holds an approval rating of 100% based on 32 reviews from critics, with an average rating of 9.35/10. The website's critics consensus reads, "Dear White People's endearing excellence returns, but with an added layer of emotional maturity that enhances the show's powerful, relevant meditations on race relations in America." On Metacritic, the second season has a score of 89 out of 100, based on 7 reviews.

The third season has a 90% approval rating on Rotten Tomatoes, based on 20 reviews, with an average rating of 8/10. The website's critics consensus states, "Though at times it vamps more than it grows, Dear White People's third season still excels thanks to its continued willingness to confront tough social issues with comedic grace." On Metacritic, the third season has a score of 78 out of 100, based on 8 critics.

=== Accolades ===
Year	Award	Category	Nominee(s)	Result	Ref.
2017	Gotham Independent Film Awards	Breakthrough Series – Long Form	Dear White People	Nominated	
2020	GLAAD Media Awards	Outstanding Comedy Series	Dear White People	Nominated	
