= Brittany Underwood =

American actress

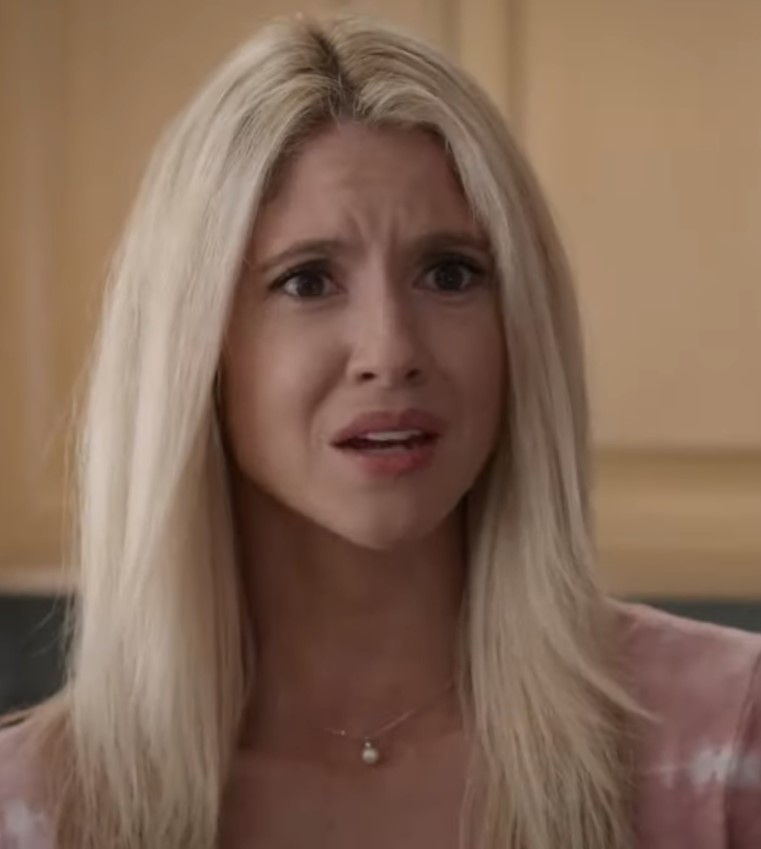
- in the television film The Killer In My Backyard (2021) by Hybrid LLC.
- Born: July 6, 1988 (age 38); Mountain Lakes, New Jersey, U.S.
- Occupation: Actress
- Years active: 2005–present

Brittany Underwood (born July 6, 1988) is an American actress, director, and singer. She is known for her roles as teenagers Langston Wilde on the daytime soap opera One Life to Live and Loren Tate on the Nick at Nite/TeenNick serial drama Hollywood Heights.

== Early life ==
Brittany Underwood was born on July 6, 1988 in Mountain Lakes, New Jersey. Her mother is Colombian and her father is American of English descent. She has an older sister named Brigitte. Underwood speaks fluent Spanish and is a black belt in Tae Kwon Do. She attended Mountain Lakes High School.

In an interview with SOAPnet in 2010, Underwood said she was currently attending Manhattanville College in Purchase, New York. At the college, she researched neuroscience, and such diseases as Alzheimer's disease and Parkinson's disease.

== Career ==
Underwood's first television role was in a 2005 episode of Law & Order: Special Victims Unit. She later auditioned for the title role in the Disney Channel series Hannah Montana, but the role went to Miley Cyrus.

Underwood portrayed Langston Wilde on the ABC Daytime soap opera One Life to Live from 2006 to 2012, a role she originated. In 2012 she starred as Loren Tate on the Nick at Nite/TeenNick serial drama Hollywood Heights. She performed several songs on both series.

Underwood officially began a singing career in 2012. On December 18, 2012, Underwood released a single called "Flow". It and more songs like "Pull Me in Again", "Black Widow", "California Wild", "Love Me Now or Let Me Go", "Shine" and "High Heels High Hopes" all are on her EP in iTunes and YouTube. In 2015, she released a single titled "Not Yet".

In 2014 Underwood played the lead in the television film Death Clique.

== Filmography ==
=== Film ===
Year	Title	Role	Notes
2010	Mariela	Mariela	Video
2011	Margaret	Leslie	
2012	Game Change	Willow Palin	TV movie
2014	Death Clique	Jade Thompson	TV movie
2015	Merry Kissmas	Kim	TV movie
2016	Hidden Truth	Natalie	TV movie
2016	The Dark Tapes	Amanda Courtney	
2016	Backstabbed	Shelby Wilson	TV movie
2017	Love on the Vines	Amelia	TV movie
2017	It Happened One Valentine's	Carson Pete	
2017	Meat Cute	Jamie	Short
2017	Deadly Vows	Helena	TV movie
2017	The Bachelor Next Door	Sage	TV movie
2017	L.A. Player	Jocelyn	Short
2018	Babysitter's Nightmare	Daphne Hart	TV movie
2019	2nd Chance for Christmas	Chance Love	TV movie
2020	Off the Grid	Sandra	TV movie
2020	Dying for A Daughter	Margaret	TV movie
2021	A Deadly Bridenapping	Leah	TV movie
2021	Hollywood.Con	Jocelyn Reynolds	
2021	Assault on va-33	Vee	
2021	The Killer in My Backyard	Allyson	TV movie
2021	Gunther	Brittany	Short
2022	The Final Rose	Nicki	
2022	Mother's Deadly Son	Tara	TV movie
2022	A Prince and Pauper Christmas	Sydney	TV movie
2023	Love's Playlist	Turnley	TV movie
2023	12 Dares of Christmas	Elara	TV movie
2023	A Royal Christmas Holiday	Katie	TV movie
2024	A Royal Christmas Ballet	Carrie	TV Movie
2024	The Book Club Murders	Natalie	TV Movie
2025	A Boyfriend to Die For	Olivia	TV Movie
2025	The Fostered	Amy	
2025	Exes of Christmas Past	Josie Fletcher	
2025	A Royal Christmas Tail	Riley	TV Movie
2026	Mr. Wonderful	Dawn	
2026	Night of the Rising Dead	Barbara	

=== Television roles ===
Year	Title	Role	Notes
2002–12	One Life to Live	Langston Wilde	Regular Cast
2005	Law & Order: Special Victims Unit	Kelly Brown	Episode "Demons"
2010–20	The Bay	Riley Henderson	Main Cast: Season 1-4, Recurring Cast: Season 5-6
2011	The Big C	Greta	Episode: "The Little c"
2012	Hollywood Heights	Loren Tate	Main Cast
2014	Major Crimes	Sydney	Episode: "Do Not Disturb"
2014	The Goldbergs	Jill Rubin	Episode: “Shall We Play a Game?”
2014–15	Youthful Daze	Sheila Edmundson	Main Cast: Season 3, Recurring Cast: Season 4
2015	TMI Hollywood	Various	Episode: "Scheana Shay Rules"

== Discography ==
- Brittany Underwood (2013)
