= Alana Mayo =

American film producer

- Born: May 2, 1984 (age 42); New York City, U.S.
- Education: Columbia University (BA)
- Occupation: Film executive
- Known for: President of Orion Pictures
- Spouse: Lena Waithe (m. 2019; div. 2021)
- Father: Barry Mayo

Alana Mayo is a film executive, producer, and president of Orion Pictures.

== Early life and education ==
Mayo was born in New York City and was raised in Chicago. Her father is radio executive Barry Mayo who helped launch WRKS and was the first black general manager of RKO General and Emmis Communications. She graduated from Columbia University in 2006 with a double major in English and film studies. At Columbia, she studied under professor Richard Peña and interned for Oscar-nominated director Lee Daniels. She also interned for independent filmmakers such as Tribeca Film Festival and Warrington Hudlin during her time in New York City.

== Career ==
After graduating from Columbia, she moved to Los Angeles and worked as an assistant to film producer Andrew Lazar for two years before being promoted to Creative Executive at Mad Chance Productions. During her tenure there, she worked on films including Get Smart and I Love You Philip Morris. She was also a Creative Executive at 20th Century Fox for two years before joining Paramount Pictures in 2012, working in the same capacity.

She was promoted to Vice President of Production at Paramount Pictures, where she worked on movies including A Quiet Place, Annihilation, The Big Short, Fences, Selma, and 13 Hours: The Secret Soldiers of Benghazi. In 2017, she was hired by Vimeo to be vice president and Head of Original Development to help create original television content for the platform.

In 2018, she was hired as Head of Production for Michael B. Jordan's production company, Outlier Society, where she oversaw production of movies and TV shows including Just Mercy, Without Remorse, Fahrenheit 451, David Makes Man, and Raising Dion. In 2020, she was tapped by MGM to relaunch its Orion Pictures label with a focus on underrepresented voices.

Mayo also served as executive producer of gen:LOCK while working as head of production at Outlier Society Productions. She was included in the 2022 Fast Company Queer 50 list.

Mayo is a 2022 Henry Crown Fellow in the Aspen Institute.

== Personal life ==
In 2017, Mayo became engaged to actress Lena Waithe. Mayo said she met Waithe as a writer and said in 2019 that she hoped to work with her on a project. In 2018, at the Essence Black Women in Hollywood Awards, Waithe expressed her love for Mayo. They married in November 2019 in San Francisco. On January 23, 2020, Waithe and Mayo announced that they had separated after two months of marriage. In November 2020, Mayo filed for divorce from Waithe; the single status of both was restored on May 24, 2021, with agreement for spousal support, and dividing up of property and other assets.
