= List of Hollywood Heights episodes =

Hollywood Heights is a Nick at Nite television drama series, that later moved to TeenNick. The show follows "the journey of a teenage girl whose life changes drastically when she becomes a star and wins the love of her rock and roll star and both are tested by setbacks, heartbreak and deception." Following the Latin American telenovela format, Hollywood Heights aired every weeknight at 9 p.m. rather than airing weekly. It aired 80 episodes over a single season.

== Episodes ==
No.	Title	Directed by	Written by	Original release date	US viewers (millions)
Nick at Nite
1	"Meeting a Rockstar"	Owen Renfroe	Sally Sussman, Brent Boyd, Lisa Seidman & Greg Schaffer	June 18, 2012	0.558
Rock star Eddie Duran and his girlfriend Chloe return to hometown LA for the last concert of his tour. Super-fan Loren and her best friend Melissa are able to talk their way into the show just as he hits the stage. Note: This episode was available on the Nick at Nite website before its air date.
2	"Loren Catches Eddie's Attention"	Owen Renfroe	Catharina Ledeboer, Jed Seidel, Sally Sussman & Brent Boyd	June 19, 2012	0.336
During Eddie's performance, Loren is overjoyed when his eyes meet hers. After the show, she sends him some lyrics to a song she wrote via Twitter and catches his attention. Jake's wife stays up all night waiting for him to come. Eddie's father thinks about his deceased wife. Chloe spends time with Tyler discussing if he could become famous with Eddie's fame. Phil commits a heist with a guy named Ray. Loren sets Melissa straight. Note: This episode was available on the Nick at Nite website before its television air date.
3	"Eddies's Songwriting Contest"	Cynthia J. Popp	Flint Wainess, Sally Sussman & Brent Boyd	June 20, 2012	N/A
Eddie meets up with Tyler to talk to him, but the two just end up arguing about the past. Melissa tells Loren about Eddie’s songwriting contest – this is her big chance. Note: This episode was available on the Nick at Nite website before its air date.
4	"Chloe's Secret"	Larry Carpenter	Valerie Ahern, Christian McLaughlin, Sally Sussman & Brent Boyd	June 21, 2012	0.392
When Loren's not happy, Melissa enters her song into the contest for her. Eddie comes dangerously close to uncovering a secret Chloe is hiding. Note: This episode was available on the Nick at Nite website before its air date.
5	"Eddie Decides to Take the Next Step"	Owen Renfroe	Josh Griffith, Brent Boyd & Sally Sussman,	June 22, 2012	N/A
Loren worries about her song entry, so Melissa and Nora work on lifting her spirits. Meanwhile, Eddie wants his relationship with Chloe to progress to the next level. Note: This episode was available on the Nick at Nite website before its air date.
6	"Loren Makes the Top 25"	Cynthia J. Popp	Flint Wainess, Sally Sussman & Brent Boyd	June 25, 2012	0.470
Loren's song makes the top 25 in the contest; Chloe steals a photo from the press; Jake teaches Kelly about "the business."
7	"Loren Has to Make a Decision"	Larry Carpenter	Lisa Seidman, Brent Boyd & Sally Sussman	June 26, 2012	0.649
Loren's priorities shift after she's awarded a scholarship. Elsewhere, Eddie alludes to tying the knot while talking to the press.
8	"Max Questions Chloe"	Michael Eilbaum	Catharina Ledeboer, Christian McLaughlin, Sally Sussman & Brent Boyd	June 27, 2012	N/A
Max grows distrustful of Chloe. Meanwhile, Tyler faces eviction; and Adriana uses Phil's help to cheat on an exam.
9	"Loren Doesn't Make the Cut"	Larry Carpenter	Lisa Seidman, Jed Seidel, Sally Sussman & Brent Boyd	June 28, 2012	0.442
Jake removes Loren's song from the list of finalists. Meanwhile, Loren plans to deliver her song to Eddie at the club opening.
10	"Eddie Questions His Feelings"	Noel Maxam	Josh Griffith, Greg Schaffer, Sally Sussman & Brent Boyd	June 29, 2012	0.688
Melissa and Loren get into the club, and Tyler kisses Chloe behind Eddie's back. Eddie sees a photo of Tyler leaving Chloe's place at 2:00 am, which may change his mind about Chloe and his previous plans to propose to her.
11	"Loren Gets Framed"	Noel Maxam	Josh Griffith, Valerie Ahern, Sally Sussman & Brent Boyd	July 2, 2012	0.566
Chloe tells Eddie the photo he found was altered. Elsewhere, Adriana and Phil plant incriminating evidence in Loren's locker.
12	"The Incriminating Photo"	Owen Renfroe	Unknown	July 3, 2012	0.497
Eddie has a surprise for Chloe. Meanwhile, Loren faces a suspension unless she can prove she's not guilty.
13	"Loren's Proven Innocent"	Cynthia J. Popp	Flint Wainess, Sally Sussman & Brent Boyd	July 4, 2012	0.434
Chloe tells Eddie that Tyler's been stalking her to explain the photo. Loren is proven innocent at school but doesn't make the contest's top five.
14	"Chloe Finally Gets What She Wants"	Casey Childs	Lisa Seidman, Brent Boyd & Sally Sussman	July 5, 2012	0.524
After Loren’s eliminated from the contest, Nora’s boss Don helps get the song to Max in an attempt at a second chance. Chloe finally gets what she wants.
15	"Loren's Song"	Noel Maxam	Lisa Seidman, Jed Seidel, Sally Sussman & Brent Boyd	July 6, 2012	0.681
Nora gets Max to listen to Loren’s song. Max shares it with Eddie, and Loren just may get back into the contest!
16	"Loren's Stage Fright"	Casey Childs	Catharina Ledeboer, Valerie Ahern, Sally Sussman & Brent Boyd	July 9, 2012	0.479
Loren is added as a finalist in the competition; Eddie warns Tyler to stay away from Chloe.
17	"Dinner at the Tate's"	Michael Eilbaum	Flint Wainess, Sally Sussman & Brent Boyd	July 10, 2012	0.343
Max mourns Katy's death on their anniversary; Nora invites Don and Adriana over for dinner.
18	"The Announcement"	Hisham Abed	Lisa Seidman, Brent Boyd & Sally Sussman	July 11, 2012	0.345
Chloe and Eddie make an announcement; Loren prepares for the contest event.
19	"Loren Gets Lost"	Owen Renfroe	Lisa Seidman, Greg Schaffer, Sally Sussman & Brent Boyd	July 12, 2012	0.320
As the contest begins, Loren and her friends are lost and stranded across town.
20	"The Songwriting Contest"	Casey Childs	Josh Griffith, Jed Seidel, Brent Boyd & Sally Sussman	July 13, 2012	0.449
Loren finds her way to the club and takes the stage to perform; Chloe is shocked when she comes face to face with her mother, Jackie.
21	"A Winner Is Chosen"	Michael Eilbaum	Flint Wainess, Sally Sussman & Brent Boyd	July 16, 2012	0.523
Loren is able to perform after conquering her stage fright; Chloe tries to hide Jackie from Eddie.
22	"The Music Video Rehearsal"	Larry Carpenter	Catharina Ledeboer, Greg Schaffer, Sally Sussman & Brent Boyd	July 17, 2012	0.433
Loren arrives for Eddies's music video shoot; and finds out that she is going to star in the music video. Phil proves his loyalty to Colorado.
23	"Chloe's Jealousy"	Larry Carpenter	Lisa Seidman, Brent Boyd & Sally Sussman	July 18, 2012	0.539
Chloe tries to be a part of Eddie's music video; Tyler reveals his secret; Eddie and Loren grow closer. Chloe has some big secrets & Max is on her trail.
24	"Max Confronts Chloe"	Owen Renfroe	Lisa Seidman, Jed Seidel, Sally Sussman & Brent Boyd	July 19, 2012	0.590
Max confronts Chloe about the dirt he has on her. Phil gets questioned about a robbery.
25	"Lisa Reveals a Secret"	Owen Renfroe	Josh Griffith, Valerie Ahern, Sally Sussman & Brent Boyd	July 20, 2012	0.694
Loren considers her future; Chloe must come clean about her past; Lisa opens up to Melissa.
26	"Loren's Dilemma"	Casey Childs	Lisa Seidman, Valerie Ahern, Christian McLaughlin & Brent Boyd	July 23, 2012	0.699
Loren meets up with Eddie and makes a huge decision about her future; Eddie and Max clash over Chloe's lies.
27	"Eddie And Chloe Meet Oz"	Michael Eilbaum	Catharina Ledeboer & Brent Boyd	July 24, 2012	0.812
Eddie encourages Chloe to reconcile with Jackie; Eddie and Chloe meet with a movie producer. Guest Star: James Franco
28	"Melissa's Birthday"	Michael Eilbaum	Flint Wainess & Brent Boyd	July 25, 2012	0.714
Chloe creates a diversion when things escalate between Jake, Max, Tyler and Eddie; Loren and Melissa clash with Phil and Adriana, things escalate between Eddie and Chloe.
29	"Chloe Turns Diva"	Noel Maxam	Lisa Seidman, Jed Seidel & Brent Boyd	July 26, 2012	0.933
Chloe shows her true colors on the set of Eddies's music video; Loren invites Eddie to spend time with her. Max's private investigator snaps a picture of Chloe and Tyler kissing, proving an affair behind Eddie's back.
30	"Another Incriminating Photo"	Michael Eilbaum	Josh Griffith, Greg Schaffer & Brent Boyd	July 27, 2012	0.660
Loren asks Eddie to help celebrate Melissa's birthday; Chloe tells her mom about the accident. Max reveals what he has uncovered about Chloe, flying Eddie into a rage, and causing Max to call off the private investigator, leaving them without knowing Chloe's DMV records.
31	"Eddie Learns The Truth"	Hisham Abed	Lisa Seidman, Greg Schaffer & Brent Boyd	July 30, 2012	0.579
Chloe's incriminating photo angers Eddie, officially ending his relationship with her and calling off the engagement. Meanwhile, Loren is ecstatic after another business meeting with Kelly, but Nora questions whether it is too good to be true.
32	"The Video Shoot"	Noel Maxam	Flint Wainess & Brent Boyd	July 31, 2012	0.742
Eddie tries to put his personal issues aside while shooting his music video after breaking up with Chloe and Loren gets a new part in the video. While the video is being shot, Max takes his chance to talk to Kelly and find out if she really is a manager. Chloe tries to stop by and Lily oversteps a boundary in an interview with Loren. Things may heat up with Max and Nora.
33	"Chloe Tries To Reconcile"	Michael Eilbaum	Catharina Ledeboer & Brent Boyd	August 1, 2012	0.780
Chloe shows up at Eddies's apartment, desperate to make amends and date him again. Eddie invites Loren to his penthouse to work on some songs but Loren gets into an argument with Chloe. Ellie acts strange around the office and Don finally pays off his ex-employee/ affair. While Phil gets deeper into trouble with Colorado.
34	"The Collaboration"	Michael Eilbaum	Josh Griffith, Lisa Seidman, Jed Seidel & Brent Boyd	August 2, 2012	0.851
Loren and Eddie work on her song together but Jake doesn't think she has enough experience or talent which leads to an argument with Kelly and Jake. Chloe does a televised interview with Lily about her breakup with Eddie; Chloe tells Eddie, Tyler blackmailed her into having an affair with him. Phil gets deeper with Colorado and promises to hijack Don's clinic.
35	"The House Party"	Michael Eilbaum	Brent Boyd, Christian McLaughlin, Josh Griffith & Valerie Ahern	August 3, 2012	0.717
Loren has a house party when her mom is out of town with Dr. Masters and Melissa surprises Loren by inviting Eddie but not Cam; it backfires when both of them come and Cam becomes jealous of Eddie. Chloe follows Eddie to Loren's house party in the valley and sees Eddie and Loren goof around. Phil and Adriana get most of her father's things but not much else.
36	"The Paparazzi Photo"	Noel Maxam	Lisa Seidman, Valerie Ahern, Christina McLaughlin & Brent Boyd	August 6, 2012	0.621
The paparazzi release a photo of Eddie and Loren. Adriana heats up an argument with Melissa and Adam. Chloe takes Tyler with her to a meeting with Oz who has big plans for the both of them. Ian takes Eddie to Rumour for brunch and they bump into Tyler.
37	"Eddie's New Song"	Casey Childs	Catharina Ledeboar, Greg Schaffer & Brent Boyd	August 7, 2012	0.747
Eddie runs into Tyler at Rumour and confirms Chloe's story, giving her the perfect opportunity to talk to Eddie, but she blows it; Tyler comforts Chloe after Eddie rejects her. Eddie and Chloe have a spat about Tyler. Eddie visits Loren at work and plays her a new song of his. Meanwhile, Don and Nora cut their trip short when they hear about the break-in at the clinic.
38	"Eddie's Birthday"	Larry Carpenter	Flint Wainess & Brent Boyd	August 8, 2012	0.659
Eddie writes songs with Loren on his birthday and asks her if he should give Chloe another chance. Tyler is tired of playing by the rules of Chloe's game. Max is worried about Eddie's feelings for Loren and Nora doesn't want Eddie to lead Loren on. Traci is getting jealous of all the time Jake and Kelly spend together.
39	"The Double Date"	Casey Childs	Lisa Seidman, Jed Seidel & Brent Boyd	August 9, 2012	0.691
Max convinces Nora and Loren to join him for Eddie's birthday dinner at Rumour. Chloe's depression causes her to take 2 tranquilizers and get very drunk, interrupting the evening the Durans were having with the Tates. Gus and Lisa are more worried than ever about Phil.
40	"Their Special Place"	Casey Childs	Josh Griffith & Brent Boyd	August 10, 2012	0.585
Chloe taunts Loren at Rumor. Kelly moves out because she doesn't want things to get awkward between her, Jake, and Traci. Eddie takes Loren home, but on the way they stop at another one of his secret spots. When they get to Loren's house, they kiss. Jackie finds Chloe overdosed on pills passed out on her bedroom floor. Phil and Adriana talk about their future.
TeenNick
41	"Eddie Inspires Loren"	Owen Renfroe	Lisa Seidman, Jed Seidel & Brent Boyd	August 13, 2012	N/A
Loren's absolutely elated and inspired after her night with Eddie, but then a picture goes public of Eddie and Chloe hugging in the hospital. Adriana and Phil's relationship may hit the rocks. Note: As of this episode, the show has moved to weeknights on TeenNick at 8/7c.
42	"Eddie Explains Himself"	Owen Renfroe	Catharina Ledeboer, Greg Schaffer, & Brent Boyd	August 14, 2012	N/A
Tyler's getting fed up with Chloe after realizing her hospital visit was just staged to bring Eddie back to her. Eddie and Loren meet up with Kelly then eat lunch only to be interrupted by Jackie begging for Eddie never to have any communication with Chloe. Loren shares her new song with Eddie and he responds by kissing Loren passionately on his piano bench. Jake and Traci take a day off work and have the day to themselves until interrupted by Kelly. Ellie blackmails Don with a sexual harassment charge to keep her job since Nora was not able to convince him not to fire Ellie.
43	"Loren's Recording Session"	Casey Childs	Flint Wainess & Brent Boyd	August 15, 2012	N/A
Eddie wants to take things slow and not dive all in with Loren. Kelly arranges Loren's first session in the recording studio and Eddie 'gives' Loren the song she entered in the contest and plays the guitar when she is singing. Osborne and Connor come up with a scheme to make Eddie think they may give the role to Tyler if Eddie is not interested. Adam is accepted to NYU and Melissa may come with him in the fall. Don doesn't fire Ellie and tries to spend time with Nora. At the end Nora ends up seeing Eddie and Loren make out.
44	"Eddie Feels At Home"	Michael Eilbaum	Josh Griffith, Lisa Seidman, Valerie Ahern, Christian Mclaughlin & Brent Boyd	August 16, 2012	N/A
Eddie joins Nora and Loren for a home cooked meal; Eddie learns more about Loren and takes her to MK. Adriana finds out she is pregnant and Gus has a chat with Phil. Ellie blackmails Don for $100,000.00 and Don puts together the money.
45	"Chloe and Oz"	Michael Eilbaum	Josh Griffith, Greg Schaffer & Brent Boyd	August 17, 2012	N/A
Eddie and Loren stayed up all night talking and watching the sunrise. Chloe is determined to turn her life around; Chloe meets with Oz and they have dinner. Loren's online video receives a positive response mostly because of Eddie's tweet.Chloe and Osborne have a chat about Chloe's career. Traci goes into Jake's emails to find out what is going on but hits a dead end. Ellie hints to Don that the blackmailing won't end. Max invites Don and Nora to his club and Nora questions what is going on with herself.
46	"Jake's Concern"	Noel Maxam	Lisa Seidman, Greg Schaffer & Brent Boyd	August 20, 2012	N/A
Eddie's new music troubles Jake but Eddie thinks that since the break-up he has grown and his fans will grow like him. Lisa suspects Adriana is pregnant and Gus makes a deal with Detective Conlee. Chloe ignores the fact that too much of the past may be uncovered in Oz's so called movie and goes to see Tyler. Chloe picks up Eddie's cell phone knowing it was Loren, telling her that Eddie's in the shower implying that they just slept together.
47	"Loren Deals with the Ex"	Casey Childs	Flint Wainess & Brent Boyd	August 21, 2012	N/A
Eddie can't say no to Chloe's desperate plea for help, but is confused about his feelings for Chloe and Loren. At the end of a phone call, Loren accidentally said, "love you" to Eddie who was surprised and answered "back at ya". Traci and Tyler share some drinks and have a conversation that may lead too deep. Melissa calls Beth but chickens out confronting her. Adriana wants to keep the child and tests her father to see if he will help. Nora and Don talk about her future and possibly moving up. Kelly gives Jake an idea about testing Eddie's new material at MK in front of some of his fans and Loren being the opening act, but Nora isn't so sure about the idea.
48	"Eddie Takes Off"	Casey Childs	Catharina Ledeboer, Valerie Ahern, Christian McLaughlin & Brent Boyd	August 22, 2012	N/A
Jake and Eddie talk about doing a small concert at MK to see if his fans like his new material. Chloe sets up a meeting not knowing that Eddie is heading out of town then is unsuccessful in finding out where. Eddie, in need of some alone time, takes off to Max's secluded beach bungalow. Max tells Loren, after the meeting that Kelly set up at MK, where Eddie is going and that Loren should go there and keep Eddie company. Nora tells Loren the discussion she had with Don about being partners. Colorado doesn't like being confronted by Detective Conlee and Gus, and puts the pressure on Phil. Loren shows up at Max's beach Bungalow.
49	"The Beach Bungalow"	Noel Maxam	Lisa Seidman, Jed Seidel & Brent Boyd	August 23, 2012	N/A
Eddie at first is cold towards Loren but then he opens up and tells her he can't trust his feeling at this point. Don tries to pressure Nora into agreeing to the plan but Nora isn't comfortable with it. Max and Kelly have a chat about Eddie and Loren's relationship friendship/romance with Chloe eavesdroping. Chloe then drops by Jake's and manipulates Traci saying there may be an affair behind Traci's back. Eddie and Loren talk about their relationship and end up kissing on the couch. Tyler makes a call to Conner about things he may not know about Chloe.
50	"Nora Visits Max"	Michael Eilbaum	Josh Griffith, Greg Schaffer & Brent Boyd	August 24, 2012	N/A
Loren and Eddie enjoy their alone time at the bungalow, and enjoy each other's company. Chloe finds out Loren is staying with Eddie and goes to Adriana to try to sabotage her. Phil decides to move out but is surprised to find Gus at his door, stabbed. Don is getting suspicious of Adriana. Tyler tries to convince Connor to put him in the movie, but is still left without an answer. Lisa blows up when finding out Melissa wants to find out about Beth. Max and Nora spend time at his club talking.
51	"Eddie's Inspired"	Casey Childs	Lisa Seidman, Jed Seidel & Brent Boyd	August 27, 2012	N/A
Eddie and Loren don't hook up but they spend time together then go back to the city. When Eddie comes back he begins to write more music. Melissa and Adam sneak out to meet her Aunt Beth but when they meet Beth acts strange and spacy . Melissa then finds out that her dad's in the hospital. Phil doesn't tell Lisa who actually hurt Gus and is being pressured by Colorado to steal the meds. Nora and Loren have one of their mother-daughter chats.
52	"Eddie Helps Chloe"	Michael Eilbaum	Catharina Ledeboer, Greg Schaffer, & Brent Boyd	August 28, 2012	N/A
After one final plea from Chloe, Eddie agrees to do Oz's movie but then finds Tyler coming out of Oz's office. Lisa talks with Adriana about her and Phil. Phil and Gus have a father-son talk about what should happen next. Kelly decides to give Loren a new makeover even though Eddie doesn't want her to change. Jake warns Eddie about Chloe. Tyler tries to convince Jackie into talking Chloe into moving back to Fresno. Tyler threatens to bring down Chloe. Don may have screwed Nora over to fix his expenses.
53	"Loren's New Look"	Casey Childs	Flint Wainess & Brent Boyd	August 29, 2012	N/A
Loren does a photo shoot, and Nora is not too fond of her look. Eddie meets with Oz, and makes an arrangement that Loren joins the movie. Oz gets arrested. Traci is still suspicious of Kelly and Jake. Melissa is determined to find out more answers about Beth. Chloe forces Jackie out of the house, and threatens her, once again, to watch her back. Tyler comes to Rumour and makes drama with Loren and Eddie. Don and Nora talk business, and Nora goes home. Eddie gets asked by a fan for a picture but the fan recognizes Loren and wants Loren in the picture. Loren then takes a picture of Eddie and the fan and Eddie knows Loren is truly down to earth. Adriana and Chloe talk business, and Adriana is worried about what Chloe will do with her information about Loren.
54	"Loren's Debut"	Casey Childs	Josh Griffith, Valerie Ahern, Christian McLaughlin & Brent Boyd	August 30, 2012	N/A
Eddie and Loren prepare for their upcoming concert at MK Club. Loren gets a call from Melissa saying that her life could be changed and to meet her at Loren's house ASAP! Tyler is more serious than ever to expose Chloe! Loren and Eddie hang out and Eddie saying that he is ready to start dating again. Jackie is going to leave to Fresno in the morning and she wants to tell Chloe something before shes leaves about Tyler. Melissa finds out that Beth is her mom and Lisa is her aunt.
55	"Eddie's New Sound"	Casey Childs	Josh Griffith & Brent Boyd	August 31, 2012	N/A
Eddie plays some of his new material for Ian and Ian's thoughts sound like Jake's opinion that it will be a huge change. Melissa has a talk with Gus and Lisa about how she got there then spends the night at Loren's. Loren gets a text from her admirer but when she shows it to Nora it spaces Nora out because she suspects it's her dad. Max plays some songs for Nora but then afterward they hookup. Nora tells Loren about her hookup with Max and Loren takes it well. Phil calls Detective Conlee then later Colorado chokes Phil and says Phil will be doing the job for free. Jake and Traci talk about their relationship compared to Jake and Kellys'.
56	"Tyler Collects Evidence"	Casey Childs	Catharina Ledeboer & Brent Boyd	September 3, 2012	N/A
Everyone starts to get ready for the concert, as Loren receives another mysterious text and tells Nora which leaves Nora with a mysterious look on her face. Ellie looks at Nora's phone and sees Max has called her a bunch and tells Nora right in front of Don leaving Don suspicious. Chloe gets the list from Adriana. Don sees Max and Nora laughing and looks sort of mad. Chloe goes on her date with Dylan and decides to go to MK with Dylan to make Eddie jealous. Melissa finds out about Lisa and Gus's lie and talks to Loren. Jackie leaves Chloe's and goes and talks to Tyler. Tyler bumps into Traci at the cafe after her talk with Kelly, Kelly introduces Loren to everyone. Phil talks to the detective guy.
57	"If There Was No Music"	Michael Eilbaum	Flint Wainess & Brent Boyd	September 4, 2012	N/A
At the concert, Eddie surprises Loren by pulling her on stage to perform with him and then plays some of his new music. Lisa gets a visit from Beth. Melissa finds that Beth had come for a visit. Loren talks to the record labels with Kelly. Kelly tells Jake how she really feels about him. Tyler tells Lily about the car accident with Max and Katy Duran. Lily stops by Chloe's to tell her what she just found out. Nora breaks off her relationship with Don for good and she tells Max. Max is happy that they broke up because he likes Nora. Max and Nora kiss. Chloe goes to the club to watch Eddie's performance. she goes with Dylan to make Eddie jealous.
58	"Mixed Reactions"	Michael Eilbaum	Lisa Seidman, Greg Schaffer & Brent Boyd	September 5, 2012	N/A
Loren's Spring Break ends. Chloe goes to Tyler's house to plead him to keep their secret but Tyler is determined to see Chloe go down. Eddie's upset his fans don't approve of his new style. Jake gives Kelly a week to get on her own feet and leave his company. Melissa shows Beth pictures of her childhood which leads to Beth admitting that she made the right decision to leave her with Lisa and Gus, then Beth runs out the door. Adam tells Loren he might be falling in love with Melissa. Tyler also threatens Chloe by telling her he's gonna go tell Eddie personally that Chloe killed his mother.
59	"Tyler Blackmails Chloe"	Casey Childs	Lisa Seidman, Jed Seidel & Brent Boyd	September 6, 2012	N/A
Tyler makes a proposition to Chloe that if she moves back to Fresno he will shut Lily up. Elsewhere, Melissa tries to face things she's uncovered about her past when Beth sends a box full of stuff from New York. Eddie finds out about most of Kelly and Jake's issues and worries about Kelly changing Loren. Eddie picks up Loren from school and they have a talk about Kelly. Kelly reveals that Jake never wanted her to sign Loren. Eddie receives a mysterious call from Lily Parks. Nora and Max have lunch at his club. Ellie continues to manipulate Don's mind. Phil and Adriana worry about their future.
60	"Loren Has Doubts"	Michael Eilbaum	Josh Griffith, Valerie Ahern, Christian McLaughlin & Brent Boyd	September 7, 2012	N/A
Eddie is disturbed by a mysterious phone call from Lily; Loren questions her professional relationship with Kelly because Eddie asked her to join Jake's company, which leads to a big argument between Kelly and Eddie. Melissa wants to move out with Loren who is against the idea. Nora thinks Loren's dad is the mysterious person who sends the text. Phil tries to make things right. Don finds out about Adriana. Eddie has a flashback, and Lily is on Tyler's side.
61	"The Mystery Texter"	Larry Carpenter	Josh Griffith, Brent Boyd & Flint Wainess	September 10, 2012	N/A
Nora tells Loren the mystery texter is her father, and Loren is confused whether she should contact him or try to find more information about him. Ellie threatens Don to give her the money, so Don goes to Colorado to sell the drugs. Adriana is suspicious of him, and follows him. Mel is suspicious of Phil. Phil tries to save Adriana from getting into trouble. Chloe gets back at Tyler and finds out his hiding place of evidence. Eddie and Lily talk about things, and Eddie isn't sure whether he wants to keep finding out about his mother.
62	"Loren Talks Business"	Casey Childs	Catharina Ledeboer, Valerie Ahern, Christian McLaughlin & Brent Boyd	September 11, 2012	N/A
Loren has a dream about her dad but can't see his face and she chokes up on stage. Eddie is concerned about Loren's meeting with a music producer since the producer wants to change Loren's image and Kelly wants someone else to write Loren's songs. Phil's dealings with Colorado comes to an end. Eddie wants to meet up with Lily at Rumor because they can talk about the death of Katy Duran and who killed her. Chloe calls Lily and Lily wants to meet up with Chloe at Rumor. Lily sets up a meeting at Rumor with both Eddie and Chloe, and of course the exes do not know that Lily did this. Traci and Kelly have a talk about them being friends again. Nora quits her job since she doesn't know what's at stake with her job and Don's decision.
63	"The Text Spoof"	Casey Childs	Lisa Seidman, Jed Seidel & Brent Boyd	September 12, 2012	N/A
Chloe sabotages Loren by sending out a fake text. Eddie clashes with Kelly about Loren's career, and Loren tells him to back off. Tyler back-lashes Chloe and tells her to leave to Fresno. Melissa records something shocking about Kelly. Phil tells Don the truth about how Adriana feels about him. Gus and Lisa are happy to finally have peace. Eddie meets with Lily but it takes a huge downfall when Chloe and Tyler show up. Chloe confronts Eddie but gets caught up when she mentions the accident. Don hits on Ellie, attempting to change her opinion about the money, but she isn't budging. Dylan is still being annoying with Chloe. Phil tells Adriana he wants to have the baby. Eddie finds out Chloe committed a crime.
64	"Eddie Demands Answers"	Owen Renfroe	Josh Griffith, Greg Schaffer & Brent Boyd	September 13, 2012	N/A
When Eddie demands answers, Chloe tells him everything, but lies about driving the car that ran Katy and Max off the road, and tells Eddie that Tyler was the one driving. Chloe is in Max's apartment, on the balcony, and Dylan, drunk, comes in and accidentally pushed her off the side. Eddie and Tyler fight, Tyler reminds Eddie that he was too drunk to drive that night, and tells him that Chloe was the one driving and Eddie storms off, leaving his phone at the MK club. Nora and Max have evening together, where Max offers Nora a job, only to find out about the 'text smear'. Phil wants to settle down with Adriana and the baby, but Adriana doesn't want to have the baby. Lisa suspects Adriana is pregnant, and talks to Phil about it, where he confirms her suspicions. He asks Gus and Lisa what he should do, and they tell him that they will be on his side, no matter what his and Adriana's decision is. Phil leaves dinner and tells Gus that he will take his job offer. Adriana and Don have a 'daughter-father' talk, Don tells Adriana that they might have to move to Miami, Adriana says that she is an adult, and can stay in LA if she wants to, and they agree that Adriana is too young to have a baby. Traci tells Jake that she wants a break from the married life, and when he tries to talk her out of it, she storms off.
65	"Missing"	Owen Renfroe	Josh Griffith, Greg Schaffer & Brent Boyd	September 14, 2012	N/A
Loren grows increasingly worried about not hearing from Eddie and begins to fear that something bad has happened to him. Max and Tyler discover Chloe after she fell off Max's terrace and have her transported to the hospital. Max and Jake search Eddie's apartment but do not find him. Max then asks Loren if there is any place where Eddie might go to think and she takes him to their spot in Ojai. Eddie stops for gas at a gas station and runs across a fan who compliments his car and asks for an autograph. Max receives a call from the police after they discover Eddie's car slid off the road and totaled. The driver of the car is found dead.
66	"Bad News Travels Fast"	Casey Childs	Josh Griffith, Lisa Seidman, Greg Schaffer & Brent Boyd	September 17, 2012	N/A
The news of Eddie's accident reaches his loved ones;after Chloe's fall she ends up in the hospital in acoma. Tyler feels guilty about his part in Chloe's situation, but points the finger towards Eddie when questioned by a police detective. Lily interrogates Tyler about Chloe. Max is requested to view the accident scene. The police want to know, if he is able to identify anything. Max identifies Eddies wallet and has a small breakdown at the police station after being asked to provide a DNA sample of Eddies, so the body can be identified. Loren is in denial, she hopes Eddie took off to spend some time alone. After an intense dream about Eddie, she starts to accept that Eddie may not come back. She is devastated, but Melissa and her mom stay on her side for support. Kelly's first thought after the news "hopefully Loren will keep in line and not throw away her career" Jake goes to see Max, but both are too hurt by the news to be of any help for each other.
67	"Max Looks For Answers"	Larry Carpenter	Flint Waisness & Brent Boyd	September 18, 2012	N/A
Mel wants Loren to talk through it. Nora comforts Max. Kelly comforts Jake as they talk about Eddie and how Loren still thinks he's alive. Jake gets out the alcohol. Phil catches up with his old friend, Ray and seems like he's getting out of the business for good. Don's in deep trouble. Adriana's having a nightmare. Mel wakes up to an absent Loren who went to Eddie's apartment. Jake and Kelly sleep together. Loren runs into Max in Eddie's apartment. Adriana talks to Phil about how she doesn't want to move in with him anymore. Nora goes to Eddie's to see Loren. They leave and Max leaves Loren with comforting words. Phil concedes to Adriana's demands for a nice house. Steven walks in on a depressed Kelly. She tells him she slept with Jake. Adriana and Phil find out about Eddie's accident. Adriana tells Don she's not going to Miami with him.
68	"Seeing a Ghost"	Owen Renfroe	Lisa Seidman, Valerie Ahern, Christian McLaughlin & Brent Boyd	September 19, 2012	N/A
Loren has several episodes at school in which she has visions of Eddie across the room, but then he disappears. She overhears Cam tell Adriana's friend, Kim how rude she is being when she speculates if Eddie left Loren his fortune in his will. Mel tells Loren she should go home from school but instead Loren wants to go to Eddie's and her special spot at Griffith Park where Loren breaks down and cries . Loren agrees with Kelly to go back to the studio and record an album, but Nora thinks Loren needs to deal with her feelings first. Max goes to Eddie's to get a DNA sample to verify that it was Eddie in the car that crashed. Jake decides to stay at a hotel and Traci will stay at their house. Traci thinks it's too late to repair their marriage. Chloe moves her fingers, although no one is there to see. Eddie is seen with his eyes closed in a bed in a rustic shack where a young man and woman discuss that his condition has not changed.
69	"Waking Up"	Michael Eilbaum	Josh Griffith & Brent Boyd	September 20, 2012	N/A
Loren runs into problems in the recording studio, but Jake helps her out of it; Chloe makes progress, and wakes up; Tyler tries to convince her that Eddie tried to kill her; Jackie plans on rushing Chloe to Fresno after she is better; Kelly flirts with Jake and tries to play games with him; Don is very close to paying back Ellie; Eddie wakes up and is very confused and wants to escape; Mel makes a montage for Loren; Adriana starts looking for apartments to live, but Phil isn't so sure; Phil's first day at work is a disaster in his point of view, but not in Gus's.
70	"A Strange Call"	Michael Eilbaum	Josh Griffith, Jed Seidel & Brent Boyd	September 21, 2012	N/A
Max receives a call from Jeremy saying Eddie is alive, and decides to leave to Ojai with Nora to find out the truth. Loren decides to have her first solo concert. Phil hates his new job, but Adriana wants him to keep it so they can make money. Jackie tells Lily she should stop snooping through others' business. Tyler tries to convince Chloe that Eddie pushed her off and he died, but Chloe is in denial. Lisa warns Mel that making a video for Loren might make her feel more down.
71	"Max and Nora Go to Ojai"	Casey Childs	Lisa Seidman, Jed Seidel & Brent Boyd	September 24, 2012	N/A
Max and Nora search an Ojai gas station for clues; Tyler urges Chloe to tell the detective that Eddie was responsible for her accident; Max threatens Tyler to stop throwing the blame on Eddie; Ellie files a lawsuit against Don, and he promises to give her the money right then and there; Mel gets a call from a famous TV producer, and is offered a job; Phil and Adriana's relationship is slowly slipping; Phil quits his job, and Gus is worried; Chloe is convinced that Eddie did not push her, and thinks Dylan did; Lia and Jeremy sing Eddie's song, but Eddie tells them to stop; Lisa gives Mel a letter from Beth, and Mel decides she's going to forget about Beth; Phil is up for a new raid with Ray; Nora comes to the office to drop off a few things, when she smells a gas leak.
72	"Loren and Kelly Clash"	Michael Eilbaum	Flint Wainess & Brent Boyd	September 25, 2012	N/A
Loren and Kelly disagree about Loren singing songs written by someone else; Nora goes to the clinic and finds Don there too. When Don tries to get out of the clinic, it explodes with him inside. Firefighters search the clinic and they find that Don is dead. Traci tells Jake that she is pregnant, but she is still not sure about her relationship with Jake. Max tries to piece together why Eddie was angry the night he disappeared, and remembers when Eddie talked to Lily about his mom's death. Lily reveals that Tyler accused Chloe of killing Katy.
73	"A Message for Loren"	Hisham Abed	Lisa Seidman, Valerie Ahern, Christian McLaughlin & Brent Boyd	September 26, 2012	N/A
Loren plans to play a new song at the memorial concert; Adriana is in denial about Don's accident; Phil and Ray head off to do their new gig, but he is stuck when he has to comfort Adriana; Ellie is still convinced that Don tried to murder her; Eddie's stubbornness increases when he asks Lia to send a message to Loren.
74	"Escape"	Casey Childs	Lisa Seidman, Valerie Ahern, Christian McLaughlin & Brent Boyd	September 27, 2012	N/A
Loren does an interview from Eddie's apartment; Eddie sees Loren on TV and decides to make a break for it; Max receives some promising news; Phil defends his innocence; Chloe is confused about if she should leave or not; Adriana refuses to believe Don tried to frame Phil; Loren and Mel attempt to make peace with Adriana.
75	"Loren Learns the Truth"	Owen Renfroe	Flint Wainess & Brent Boyd	September 28, 2012	N/A
Loren learns that Eddie is still alive; Chloe tries to remember what happened the night of her fall; Loren learns what Kelly really wants out of her, and they both clash; Max tries to figure out what happened to Eddie; Phil tries to find an alibi, and Adriana tries to stop him; Eddie's escape attempt hits a snag; Ellie tells an investigator about everything.
76	"Loren Confronts Chloe"	Casey Childs	Josh Griffith, Jed Seidel & Brent Boyd	October 1, 2012	N/A
Loren tries to get Chloe to admit the truth about her accident, but eventually fails. Max proposes a deal with Chloe; she has one hour to drop Eddie's charges or he will make sure that the death of his wife is blamed on Chloe. Eddie decides it’s time to move on. Traci and Kelly clash about Jake. Phil catches Ellie fishing through Don's desk. When asked, Chloe points fingers at Eddie, but remembers Dylan pushed her. Adriana tells Conlee that Phil is staying at her house. Mel and Adam take their relationship to the next level. Lia kisses Eddie after driving him to a hotel in Los Angeles.
77	"Jetsetter"	Casey Childs	Josh Griffith, Greg Schaffer & Brent Boyd	October 2, 2012	N/A
Kelly delivers some exciting news about Loren’s upcoming gig. Eddie sneaks out to send Loren an anonymous message, and is caught by someone. Jackie and Tyler convince Chloe to move back to Fresno. Max is determined to take down Chloe. Mel feels her friendship with Loren is changing. Adriana is worried when she is being accused of possible murder. Lisa and Gus hire a lawyer for Phil. Jake moves back in, and Kelly tries to stir up more trouble. Adam is thinking about staying in Los Angeles to be with Melissa.
78	"Fresno"	Michael Eilbaum	Josh Griffith, Greg Schaffer & Brent Boyd	October 3, 2012	N/A
Max urges Loren to put her worry for Eddie aside and enjoy her big moment. Tyler and Chloe get an unexpected guest in Fresno, Eddie. Eddie wants Chloe to tell the police the truth, that he didn't push her but Tyler demands that it was true and for him to leave. Chloe says she'll do it if he breaks up with Loren. He decides to decline and accuses her of not knowing what it's like to be in love, which is of course, true. Chloe has horrible memories of her childhood in Fresno, and begins to think she is a terrible person. Traci finds out she isn't pregnant, and she never was. Nora and Lisa clash about how to raise a child. Phil holds a grudge against Adriana for turning him into the police.
79	"An Unexpected Guest"	Owen Renfroe	Josh Griffith & Brent Boyd	October 4, 2012	N/A
While Loren’s getting ready for the concert, she comes face to face with her dad for the first time in 14 years. Eddie confronts Chloe and Tyler and threatens to expose their secret unless she drops the charges against Eddie. Traci decides that her marriage with Jake will not work, and decides to take the job in Chicago. Eddie becomes determined to get into Loren's concert.
80	"The Final Concert"	Owen Renfroe	Josh Griffith & Brent Boyd	October 5, 2012	N/A
Loren senses Eddie at her concert and makes a quick change to her set list. Eddie does his best to avoid being caught by the cops. Eddie meets Loren at their spot at Griffith Park and Eddie tells Loren he loves her. They kiss, then Eddie gets arrested. Chloe tells police she wants to drop all the charges against Eddie. Max asks Nora to move in with him. Tyler takes a job with Osborne Silver. Chloe confronts Tyler about leaving her in Fresno. Tyler rejects Chloe, she is broken-hearted. The police find Ellie, and she confesses to hitting Don with the flashlight and leaving him in the clinic. All of Phil's charges are dropped. Phil proposes to Adriana. Lia goes to Jake's office and Lia and her brother get everything they wanted. Eddie meets Loren at his apartment. Loren, Eddie, Kelly, Jake, Max, and Nora all get on a private jet to head to the music festival in New York. The episode ends with Eddie and Loren kissing, and the private jet flying away.
