= Brandon P. Bell =

American actor

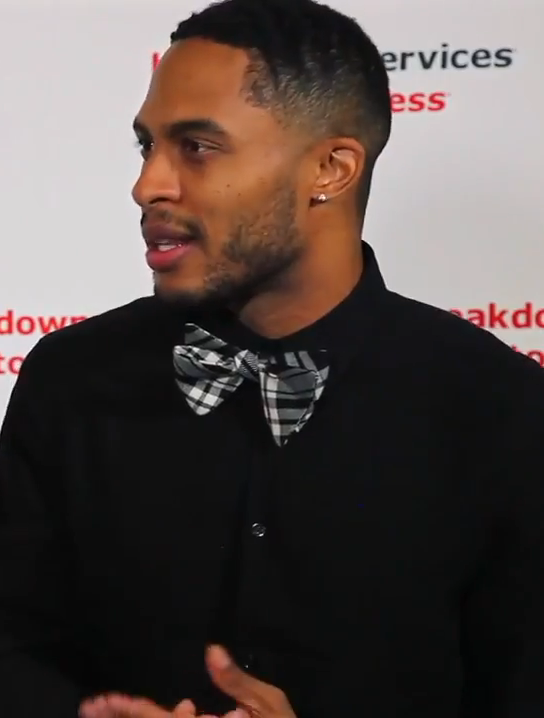
- Bell in 2018
- Born: Dallas, Texas, U.S.
- Education: University of Southern California
- Occupations: Actor; producer
- Years active: 2006–present

Brandon P. Bell (born January 13) is an American actor, who is best known for his roles on the television series Hollywood Heights and Dear White People.

== Early life ==
Born in Dallas, Texas, he attended the University of Southern California with a drama scholarship. Prior to focusing full time on his acting career, Bell played soccer for seven years traveling to France and winning the USA Cup Gold Medal.

== Career ==
Bell landed the role of Jake Madsen in the 2012 television series Hollywood Heights. In 2014, he starred as Troy Fairbanks in comedy-drama film Dear White People, which was adapted into a Netflix series of the same name.

== Filmography ==
=== Films ===
Year	Title	Role	Notes
2006	Mission: Impossible III	Party Guest	uncredited
2014	Dear White People	Troy Fairbanks	

=== Television series ===
Year	Title	Role	Notes
2008	Sons of Anarchy	ATF Administrator	1 episode
2009	90210	Cop	1 episode
2009	FlashForward	Paramedic #1	1 episode
2010	NCIS	Ranger Jake	1 episode
2011	Real Monkey Nuts	Brian	1 episode
2011	The Protector	Kenny Holder	1 episode
2011	Revenge	Steven Gordon	1 episode
2012	Switched at Birth	Coach Medlock	6 episodes
2012	2 Broke Girls	Officer Mars	2 episodes
2012	Hollywood Heights	Jake Madsen	77 episodes
2013	Family Tools	Logan	1 episode
2014	Love That Girl!	Kent	1 episode
2014	Ascension	Aaron Gault	Main cast, 3 episodes
2015	CSI: Crime Scene Investigation	Kyle Ellis	1 episode
2015	Aquarius	Dan Markham	1 episode
2015	Satisfaction	Chris	2 episodes
2016	Insecure	Dr. Michael Peete	2 episodes
2017–2021	Dear White People	Troy Fairbanks	Main cast, 30 episodes
2019	Traitors	Jackson Cole	6 episodes
2025	Foundation	Han Pritcher	3 episodes

== Awards and nominations ==
Year	Awards	Category	Nominated work	Result	Ref.
2015	Black Reel Awards	Outstanding Breakthrough Performance, Male	Dear White People (film)	Nominated	
2017	Black Reel Awards for Television	Outstanding Actor, Comedy Series	Dear White People (series)	Nominated	
