= Lena Waithe =

American actress, producer and screenwriter (born 1984)

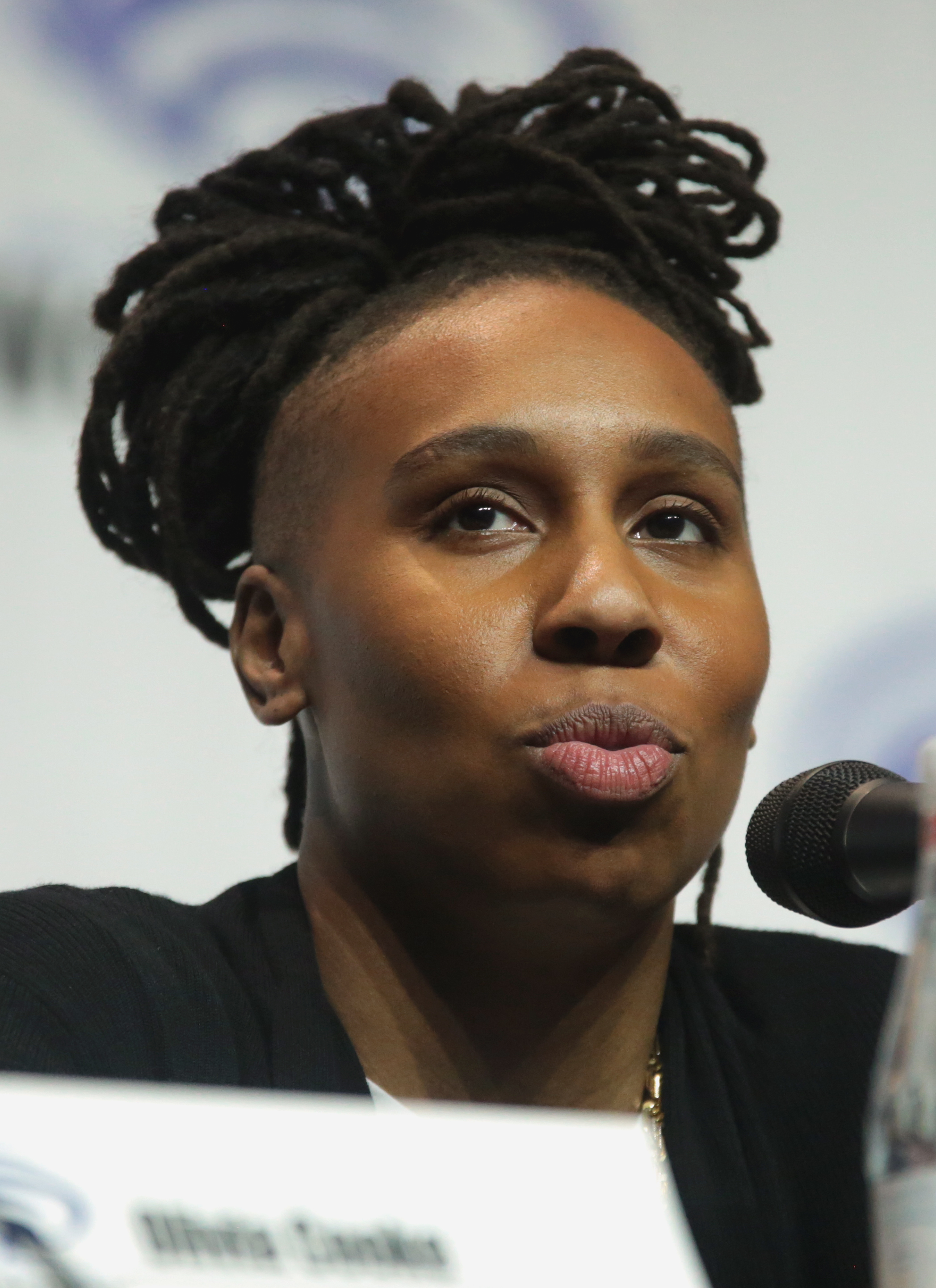
- Waithe at the 2018 WonderCon
- Born: May 17, 1984 (age 42); Chicago, Illinois, U.S.
- Education: Columbia College Chicago (BFA)
- Occupations: Actress; producer; screenwriter
- Years active: 2007–present
- Spouse: Alana Mayo (m. 2019; div. 2021)

Lena Waithe (/weɪθ/; born May 17, 1984) is an American actress, producer, and screenwriter. She is the creator of the Showtime drama series The Chi (2018–26) and the BET comedy series Boomerang (2019–20) and Twenties (2020–21). She also wrote and produced the crime film Queen & Slim (2019) and is the executive producer of the horror anthology series Them (2021–present).

Waithe gained recognition for her role in the Netflix comedy-drama series Master of None (2015–2021), and became the first African-American woman to win the Primetime Emmy Award for Outstanding Writing for a Comedy Series in 2017 for writing the episode "Thanksgiving", which was loosely based on her personal experience of coming out to her mother. She has also appeared in Steven Spielberg's 2018 adventure film Ready Player One and the HBO series Westworld. In 2023, she received a nomination for Best Play at the 76th Tony Awards, her production work on the sketch-comedy play Ain't No Mo'.

Waithe was named one of Time magazine's 100 Most Influential People of 2018; and was included on Fast Company's Queer 50 list in 2021 and 2022.

== Early life and education ==
Waithe was born in Chicago, Illinois. Her father, Lawrence David Waithe, died when she was 15. Her paternal great-grandfather, Winston Waithe, emigrated from Barbados to Boston in 1921; his family, descended from enslaved people on sugar plantations, was from Christ Church, Barbados. Though acting was not originally among her ambitions, she knew from the age of seven that she wanted to be a television writer and received strong family support for her writing from her single mother and grandmother. Her parents had divorced when she was 3. Waithe and her sister grew up on the South Side of Chicago until Waithe was 12; she attended a local, mostly African-American elementary magnet school, Turner-Drew, but moved to Evanston and finished middle school at Chute Middle School. She graduated from Evanston Township High School and earned a degree in cinema and television arts from Columbia College Chicago in 2006, praising faculty playwright Michael Fry for his teaching and encouragement. Seeking more ways to involve herself in the television and film industry, she also worked at a movie theater, at a Best Buy, and at a Blockbuster.

== Career ==
Having arrived in Los Angeles, Waithe secured a job as an assistant to the executive producer of Girlfriends, a long-running sitcom. Soon after, she landed a minor role in Lisa Kudrow's The Comeback. She later became a writer for the Fox television series Bones, a writer for the 2012 Nickelodeon sitcom How to Rock, and a producer on the 2014 satirical comedy film Dear White People. Waithe wrote and appeared in the YouTube series "Twenties", produced by Flavor Unit Entertainment and optioned in 2014 by BET. In addition to writing and directing the short film "Save Me", which was shown at several independent film festivals, Waithe wrote the 2013 web series "Hello Cupid" and the 2011 viral video Shit Black Girls Say.

In 2014, Variety named Waithe one of its "10 Comedians to Watch". In August 2015, Showtime commissioned a pilot for an upcoming series, The Chi, written by Waithe and produced by Common, which tells a young urban Black-American man's coming-of-age story. As the show's creator, Waithe wanted to mine her experience growing up on the South Side and experiencing its diversity to craft a story that paints a more nuanced portrait of her hometown than is typically shown. Similarly, she extended her influence to support the Black-American community in the entertainment industry through her role as co-chair of the Committee of Black Writers at the Writers Guild.

In 2015, Waithe was cast in the Netflix series Master of None after meeting creator and lead actor Aziz Ansari who, with Alan Yang, had originally written Denise as a straight, white woman with the potential, according to Waithe, to evolve into one of the main character's love interests: "For some reason, [casting director] Allison Jones thought about me for it, a Black gay woman." Ansari and Yang rewrote the script to make the character more like Waithe: "All of us actors play heightened versions of ourselves." She said, "I don't know if we've seen a sly, harem pants-wearing, cool Topshop sweatshirt-wearing, snapback hat-rocking lesbian on TV." She also said, "I know how many women I see out in the world who are very much like myself. We exist. To me, the visibility of it was what was going to be so important and so exciting."

In 2017, Waithe and Ansari won the Primetime Emmy Award for Outstanding Writing for a Comedy Series for the season 2 episode "Thanksgiving". She became the first African-American woman to win an Emmy in that category. Waithe described the episode as based on her coming out experience as a lesbian. During her Emmy speech, she sent a special message to her LGBTQIA (Lesbian, Gay, Bisexual, Transgender, Queer, Intersex, and Asexual) family discussing how "The things that make us different—those are our superpowers." She ended her speech by recognizing her journey as a Black woman, saying, "Thank you for embracing a little Indian boy from South Carolina and a little queer Black girl from the South Side of Chicago." Waithe also developed an autobiographical drama series, The Chi. Out Magazine named Waithe the Out100: Artist of the Year on November 8, 2017.

Since 2018, Waithe has provided the voiceover of the tagline of AT&T commercials. The same year, she became the first Black queer woman since November 2003 to be featured on the cover of Vanity Fair magazine. Waithe also founded her production company, Hillman Grad Productions.

Waithe wrote and produced the road trip-crime film Queen & Slim, starring Jodie Turner-Smith and Daniel Kaluuya, and directed by Melina Matsoukas. It was released on November 27, 2019, by Universal Pictures. This film focuses on powerful social issues such as systemic racism, police brutality and oppression. It has been depicted as a “a meditation on a system of justice that treats innocent people as outlaws,” or “a bourgeois representation of the struggle against police oppression." Queen & Slim won a BET Award for Best Movie (2020), Florida Film Critics Circle Award (2019) as well as other awards.

In 2020, Waithe lent her voice to the Pixar animated film Onward, portraying the cyclops police officer Specter, the first queer animated character in Disney history.

She focuses on recruiting more people of color and queer artists for her film and television projects. In 2020 her production company, Hillman Grad Productions, opened a mentoring and training program with financial support from the Froneri ice-cream company. More recently, she signed a deal with the Warner Bros. TV Group in order to develop a TV version of Hoop Dreams.

== Personal life ==
She is a lesbian, and has spoken publicly about her identity as a lesbian woman. Waithe became engaged in 2017 to Alana Mayo, a content executive. They married in 2019 in San Francisco. On January 23, 2020, Waithe and Mayo announced that they had separated after two months of marriage. In November 2020, Mayo filed for divorce from Waithe; the divorce was finalized by agreement on May 24, 2021. Waithe's relationship with English actress Cynthia Erivo was confirmed in 2024.

Waithe has described her family as "lazy Christians" and said in 2018, "I'm a huge believer in God, and Jesus Christ, and that God made me and all those things. And I try to just be a good person. I think that is the base of my religion, is to be good, is to be honest."

== Filmography ==
=== Film ===
Year	Title	Role	Notes
2011	Save Me	—N/a	Short film; Director, writer
2014	Dear White People	—N/a	Producer
2014	Ladylike	—N/a	Co-producer
2018	Step Sisters	—N/a	Producer
2018	Ready Player One	Aech / Helen	
2019	Queen & Slim	—N/a	Screenwriter, co-producer
2020	Bad Hair	Brook-Lynne	
2020	The Forty-Year-Old Version	—N/a	Producer
2020	Onward	Officer Specter (voice)	
2021	The One and Only Dick Gregory	Herself	Also executive producer
2022	Beauty	—N/a	Screenwriter, producer
2023	House Party	Herself	
2023	A Thousand and One	—N/a	Producer
2023	Chang Can Dunk	—N/a	Producer
2023	Kokomo City	—N/a	Executive producer
2026	Place to Be	TBA	

=== Television ===
==== Actress ====
Year	Title	Role	Notes
2014	The Comeback	Summer	Episode: "Valerie Faces the Critics"
2015, 2017, 2021	Master of None	Denise	Main Role
2016	Transparent	Jane	Episode: "Elizah"
2018	This Is Us	Animal Shelter Clerk	Episode: "That'll Be the Day"
2018	Dear White People	P. Ninny	3 episodes
2019	A Black Lady Sketch Show	Office Employee	Episode: "Your Boss Knows You Don't Have Eyebrows"
2020	The Healing Powers of Dude	Lord Dingwall	Episode: "I'll Be Right Here"
2020	Westworld	Ash	8 episodes
2020	The Chi	Camille Hallaway	3 episodes
2020–2025	Big Mouth	Lena Foreman (voice)	4 episodes
2022	The Proud Family: Louder and Prouder	Adult Maya Leibowitz-Jenkins (voice)	Episode: "When You Wish Upon a Roker"
2025	Grey's Anatomy	Dr. Evynn Moore	Episode: "Jump (for My Love)" and others

==== Writer ====
Year	Title	Role	Notes
2012	M.O Diaries	Writer	TV series
2012	How to Rock	Writer	2 episodes
2013	Hello Cupid	Writer	7 episodes
2014–2015	Bones	Staff writer	15 episodes
2015, 2017, 2021	Master of None	Writer	6 episodes
2018–2026	The Chi	Creator; writer	11 episodes
2019–2020	Boomerang	Creator; writer; executive producer	4 episodes
2020	Twenties	Creator; executive producer	8 episodes

==== Producer ====
Year	Title	Role	Notes
2021	Them	Executive producer	TV series

== Awards and nominations ==
Year	Award	Category	Work	Result
2015	Independent Spirit Awards	Best First Feature	Dear White People	Nominated
2015	Gotham Awards	Audience Award	Dear White People	Nominated
2015	Black Reel	Outstanding Motion Picture	Dear White People	Nominated
2017	Primetime Emmy Award	Outstanding Writing for a Comedy Series	"Thanksgiving", Master of None	Won
2018	Chicago Independent Film Critics Circle	Trailblazer Award	—N/a	Nominated
2018	Writers Guild of America	Comedy Series	Master of None	Nominated
2018	NAACP Image Awards	Writing – Comedy Series	Master of None	Nominated
2018	MTV Movie Award	Best on Screen Team	Ready Player One	Nominated
2019	St. Louis Film Critics Association	Best Original Screenplay	Queen & Slim	Nominated
2019	Black Film Critics Circle Awards	Best Original Screenplay	Queen & Slim	Won
2023	Tony Awards	Best Play	Ain't No Mo'	Nominated
