= Dear White People =

2014 film by Justin Simien

- Theatrical release poster
- Directed by: Justin Simien
- Written by: Justin Simien
- Produced by: Effie Brown; Ann Le; Julia Lebedev; Angel Lopez; Justin Simien; Lena Waithe
- Starring: Tyler James Williams; Tessa Thompson; Kyle Gallner; Teyonah Parris; Brandon P. Bell; Malcolm Barrett; Dennis Haysbert
- Cinematography: Topher Osborn
- Edited by: Phillip J. Bartell
- Music by: Kathryn Bostic
- Production companies: Code Red Films; Duly Noted; Homegrown Pictures
- Distributed by: Lionsgate; Roadside Attractions
- Release dates: January 18, 2014 (Sundance); October 17, 2014 (United States)
- Running time: 108 minutes
- Country: United States
- Language: English
- Budget: $1.3 million
- Box office: $5.4 million

Dear White People is a 2014 American comedy-drama film written, directed and co-produced by Justin Simien in his feature-length directorial debut. The film focuses on escalating racial tensions at a fictitious, prestigious Ivy League college from the perspective of several black students. It stars Tyler James Williams, Tessa Thompson, Kyle Gallner, Teyonah Parris, Brandon P. Bell, Brittany Curran, Marque Richardson and Dennis Haysbert.

The film premiered in competition in the US Dramatic Category at 2014 Sundance Film Festival on January 18, 2014. The film had a theatrical release in United States on October 17, 2014. A commercial and critical success, the film profited at the box office and received positive reviews from many professional critics. It has also been nominated for and has received several awards.

In 2017, the film was adapted into a Netflix series of the same name, also with Simien's involvement. Like the film, the series has also enjoyed critical acclaim.

== Plot ==
Samantha White, a media arts major at the fictional Winchester University, causes a stir at the prestigious and predominantly white school by criticizing white people and the racist transgressions at Winchester in her sharp-tongued, witty radio show Dear White People and her self-published book, Ebony and Ivy. Tensions rise when Sam runs to become head of house of Armstrong-Parker, the historically black house on campus. She is opposed by Troy Fairbanks, an ex-boyfriend who harbors dreams of being a comedic writer, but who is pressed by his father, the school's dean, to become a lawyer, to not give white people a chance to profile him, and to give nothing less than his best. Coco is trying to persuade a reality TV producer to do a show on her, but he would prefer to highlight the light-skinned Sam. Lionel Higgins, a black gay student, gets a chance to find his place at Winchester by being recruited by the school's most prestigious student newspaper to write a piece on Sam and the black experience at Winchester. When Kurt, a white student and son of the school's president, and his club throw a blackface party in response to Sam's outspoken show, black students appear at the party, and a brawl ensues.

== Cast ==
- Tyler James Williams as Lionel Higgins
- Tessa Thompson as Samantha "Sam" White
- Kyle Gallner as Kurt Fletcher
- Teyonah Parris as Collandrea "Coco" Conners
- Brandon P. Bell as Troy Fairbanks
- Brittany Curran as Sofia Fletcher
- Justin Dobies as Gabe
- Marque Richardson as Reggie
- Malcolm Barrett as Helmut West
- Dennis Haysbert as Dean Fairbanks
- Peter Syvertsen as President Fletcher
- Brandon Alter as George
- Kate Gaulke as Annie
- Brian James as Martin
- Keith Myer as Mitch
- Bryan Daniel Porter as Gordon
- Terry Hempleman as Professor Bodkin
- Naomi Ko as Sungmi
- Ashley Blaine Featherson as Curls
- Jemar Michael as Smoothe
- Courtney Sauls as Wild

== Production ==
=== Development ===
Justin Simien spent five years writing the script, beginning in 2007. The next year, he made a trailer to promote and gain attention and funds for his project, which went viral. Further, he launched an Indiegogo campaign to raise $25,000 but received an overwhelming response and raised $40,000 instead.

The project won IndieWire's Project of the Year title and Simien was later invited to the 2013 Tribeca Film Festival to participate in Filmmaker/Industry meetings hosted by the festival. Talking about Tribeca Film Festival, Simien said that "we had a lot of meetings with a lot of studios. We had a lot of conversations with studios and distributors and basically, we decided that the best offer on the table was from an independent financier, Julie Lebedev of Code Red Films. To make it independently, that was really the dream -- because then we could make the movie we wanted to make."

=== Filming ===
Principal photography took place in late September 2013 in Minnesota, including at the University of Minnesota and other locations in Minneapolis and Saint Paul, and in Los Angeles, including the UCLA campus. The filming was completed in 19 days. Simien shot the film with Red Epic digital camera and said that "I would love to shoot on film. I don't believe it's completely dead, but this format made a lot of sense for our production."

== Reception ==
=== Box office ===
Dear White People grossed $347,959 in its first weekend in only 11 theaters. It went on to earn $4,404,154 in a limited theatrical run, finishing as the third-highest-grossing film to come out of the 2014 Sundance Film Festival.

=== Critical response ===
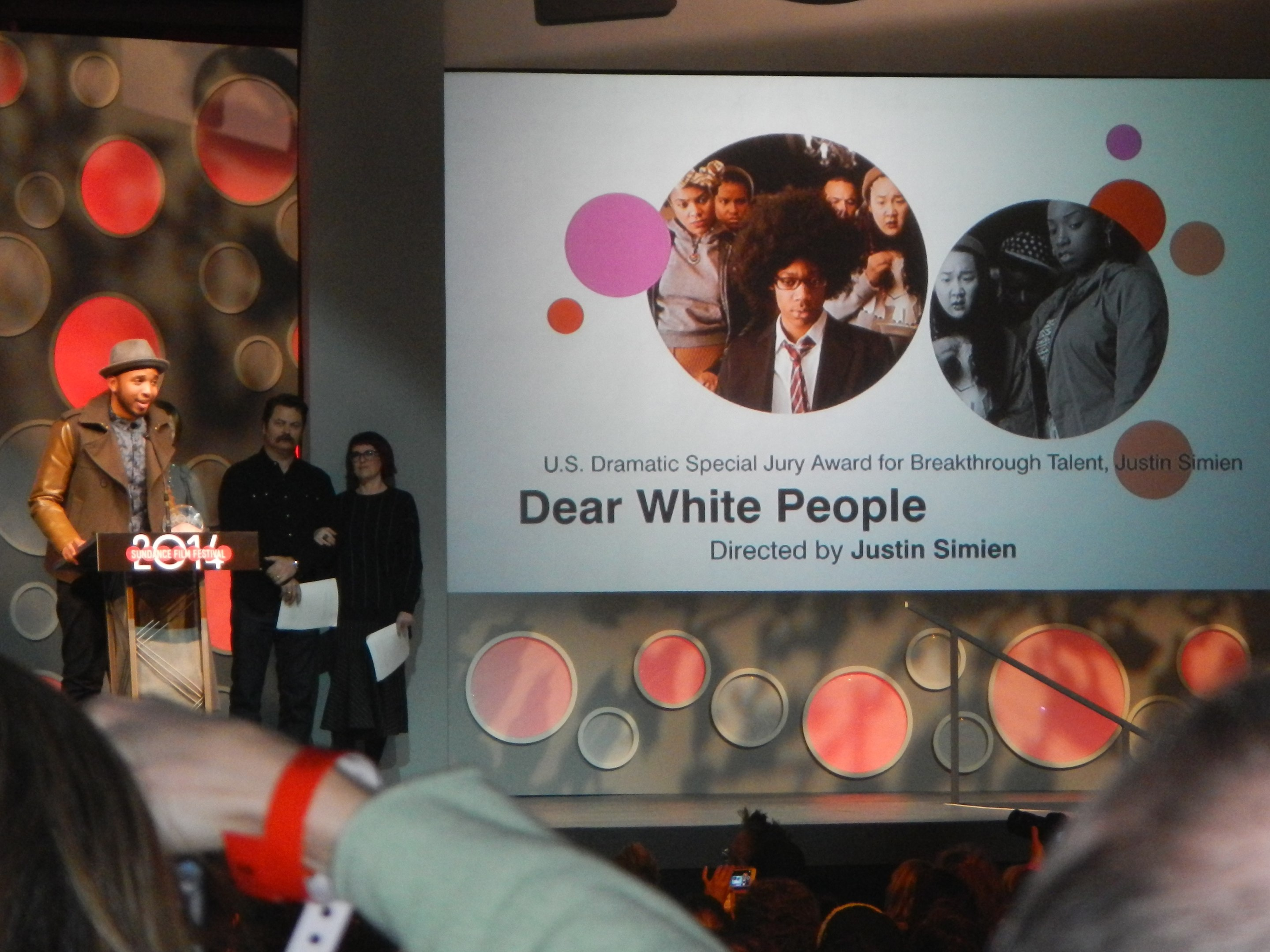
Justin Simien, director of Dear White People, won the U.S. Dramatic Special Jury Award for Breakthrough Talent at the 2014 Sundance Film Festival.

Review aggregator Rotten Tomatoes gave the film an approval rating of 91% based on 130 reviews, with an average rating of 7.47/10. The site's critical consensus reads "Dear White People adds a welcome new voice to cinema's oft-neglected discussion of race, tackling its timely themes with intelligence, honesty, and gratifyingly sharp wit." On Metacritic, the film has a score of 79 out of 100, based on 32 critics, indicating "generally favorable" reviews.

Justin Chang, in his review for Variety, said that the film "provokes admiration for having bothered to ask some of the hard questions without pretending to know any of the answers" and praising the cast said that "Williams, Thompson, Parris and Bell all make strong, distinctive impressions, with Thompson perhaps the standout as the film’s sharpest and most enigmatic figure." Justin Lowe of The Hollywood Reporter praised the performances of cast, saying, "Thompson’s conflicted student activist, which she pulls off with practiced composure. Williams manages to consistently dial up Lionel's nervousness and bewilderment throughout the film to a point of heightened tension that necessitates decisive resolution. As lovers, then rivals who must eventually seek mutual accommodation, Parris and Bell understand that for Coco and Troy, discovering humility is just the beginning of these characters' realigned journeys." He further added, "An edgy premise and memorable cast make for a potent first impression." Zeba Blay of IndieWire gave a positive review and said, "With its vividly drawn world and characters, the movie doesn’t presume to encompass the entirety of what it means to be black, but it does give one of the most entertaining and honest depictions of black life in a so-called “white” world in years." Terence Johnson of ScottFeinberg.com gave a positive review to the film and said that "Dear White People is a perfect film for today’s generation".

== Accolades ==
Accolades
Year	Award / Film Festival	Category	Recipient(s)	Result	Ref.
2014	Palm Springs International Film Festival	Directors to Watch	Justin Simien	Won	
2014	Sundance Film Festival	U.S. Dramatic Special Jury Award for Breakthrough Talent	Justin Simien	Won	
2014	Gotham Independent Film Awards	Bingham Ray Breakthrough Director Award	Justin Simien	Nominated	
2014	Gotham Independent Film Awards	Breakthrough Actor	Tessa Thompson	Won	
2015	Black Reel Awards	Outstanding Film	Dear White People	Nominated	
2015	Black Reel Awards	Outstanding Director	Justin Simien	Nominated	
2015	Black Reel Awards	Outstanding Screenplay, Adapted or Original	Justin Simien	Nominated	
2015	Black Reel Awards	Outstanding Original Score	Kathryn Bostic	Nominated	
2015	Black Reel Awards	Outstanding Ensemble, Casting Director	Kim Coleman	Nominated	
2015	Black Reel Awards	Outstanding Actress, Motion Picture	Tessa Thompson	Nominated	
2015	Black Reel Awards	Outstanding Breakthrough Performance, Male	Tyler James Williams	Won	
2015	Black Reel Awards	Outstanding Breakthrough Performance, Male	Brandon Bell	Nominated	
2015	Black Reel Awards	Outstanding Breakthrough Performance, Female	Teyonah Parris	Won	
2015	Black Reel Awards	Outstanding Supporting Actress, Motion Picture	Teyonah Parris	Nominated	
2015	Independent Spirit Awards	Best First Screenplay	Justin Simien	Won	
2015	Independent Spirit Awards	Best First Feature	Justin Simien, Effie Brown, Ann Le, Julia Lebedev, Angel Lopez and Lena Waithe	Nominated	
2015	NAACP Image Awards	Outstanding Motion Picture	Dear White People	Nominated	
2015	NAACP Image Awards	Outstanding Independent Motion Picture	Dear White People	Nominated	
2015	NAACP Image Awards	Outstanding Actress in a Motion Picture	Tessa Thompson	Nominated	

== TV series ==
On May 5, 2016, Lionsgate announced a deal to produce a series based on the film, distributed through Netflix. This is the second Netflix original program for Lionsgate Television, following Orange Is the New Black.

== See also ==
- White People (film)
- List of black films of the 2010s
