= Paul Iacono =

American actor

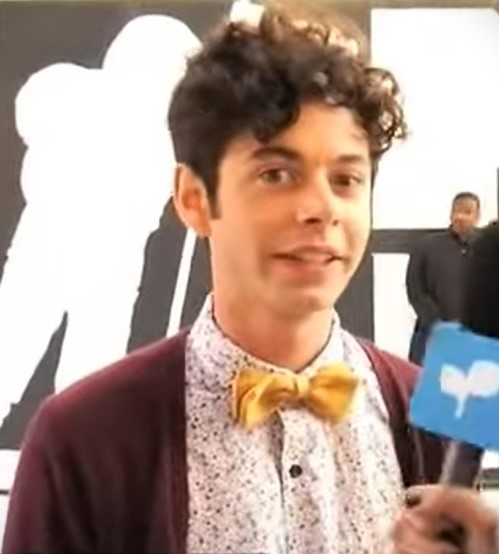
- Iacono in 2011
- Born: September 7, 1988 (age 37); Secaucus, New Jersey, USA
- Education: Professional Performing Arts School
- Occupations: Actor; writer; comedian
- Years active: 1997–present
- Notable work: Fame (2009); The Hard Times of RJ Berger (2010-2011)
- Height: 5'9 (165 cm)

Paul Iacono is an American actor and writer. He is best known for portraying RJ Berger in the MTV scripted series The Hard Times of RJ Berger.

== Early years ==
Iacono's parents, Michele and Anthony, are Italian American. He has a younger brother, who works as DJ in New Jersey, and a sister, from his Dad's second marriage. Iacono went to Professional Performing Arts School in New York, with friend and Fame co-star Paul McGill. He graduated in 2006.

At eight years old, Iacono was diagnosed with acute lymphoblastic leukemia. He soon began receiving chemotherapy treatments and has been in remission since he was eleven years old.

== Career ==
A graduate of NYC's Professional Performing Arts School, Iacono is best known for his portrayal of the title character on MTV's, The Hard Times of RJ Berger.

Paul first gained wide notice for his numerous appearances on TV's The Rosie O'Donnell Show after Rosie O'Donnell discovered his unique talents for impersonating Frank Sinatra and Ethel Merman, at age 8.

Starting out as child actor in the NYC theater scene, Paul has appeared in over 100 theatrical productions. He has shared the stage with such greats as Mickey Rooney in The Wizard of Oz and Stephanie Mills in the original "Paper Mill Playhouse" production of Stephen Schwartz's Children of Eden. Iacono can be heard on the original cast recording. Other theatrical credits include Mame with Christine Ebersole, Noël Coward's Sail Away with Elaine Stritch and Marian Seldes, and John Guare's Landscape of the Body, with Lili Taylor and Sherie Rene Scott.

Paul's film career includes the MGM's remake of Fame, No God, No Master with David Strathairn, and Darren Stein's teen comedy, G.B.F.. Other films include Drew Barrymore's, Animal, Rhymes with Banana with Zosia Mamet and Judith Light, and "Unreachable by Conventional Means," with Alexandra Daddario and Tovah Feldshuh. According to Entertainment Weekly, co-star Megan Mullally gave Iacono high praise for his improvisational acting and singing skills.

Iacono appears in an Adidas commercial featuring rapper Bobby Ray "B.o.B" Simmons Jr and also appears in Bobby Ray's Music Video "Magic", featuring Rivers Cuomo.

As a creator, Paul wrote and produced the NY play, "Prince/Elizabeth", and is in development on his second pilot, "GIF'ted".

As a writer, Iacono penned the play High Priest. In 2024, the world premiere reading of the play took place at La MaMa Experimental Theatre Club, directed by Rachel Klein. The piece explores the history of The Factory, with a focus on figures like Ondine, Andy Warhol, Edie Sedgwick, Billy Name, Paul Morrissey, Lou Reed, Nico, and others. Following the reading, a post-show discussion featured Danny Fields and Vincent Fremont.

== Personal life ==
Iacono is gay and a major LGBTQ activist, having publicly come out in Michael Musto's Village Voice Column in April 2012. He was named one of OUT Magazine's 100 most influential gay, lesbian, bisexual, or transgender people for 2013.

In an April 2012 interview with Michael Musto from The Village Voice, Iacono revealed that he is attracted to both men and women, but prefers men much more and identifies as a gay man and as bisexual. Iacono stated that "I am attracted to girls, I'm just attracted to guys much more."

== Filmography ==
=== Film ===
Year	Title	Role	Notes
2004	Winter Solstice	Jr.	Uncredited
2005	Shakes	Young Shakes	Short
2008	Glow Ropes: The Rise and Fall of a Bar Mitzvah Emcee	Ricky Lopefrawitz	
2008	Return to Sleepaway Camp	Pee Pee	
2009	Fame	Neil Baczynsky	
2010	Consent	Mickey	
2012	Mac & Devin Go to High School	Mahatma Chang Greenberg	
2012	No God, No Master	Tony Cafiero	
2012	Rhymes with Banana	Ted	
2013	G.B.F.	Brent Van Camp	
2014	Animal	Sean	
2017	Dating My Mother	Richard	
2018	The Bad Guys	Paul	

=== Television ===
Year	Title	Role	Notes
2000	Dora the Explorer	Benny the Bull	Episode "Maestra"
2005	The Naked Brothers Band: The Movie	Party Boy	TV movie
2007	Human Giant	Billy Boy	2 episodes
2010-2011	The Hard Times of RJ Berger	R.J. Berger	Main role
2014	Chozen	Fridget	Voice

=== Stage ===
Year	Title	Role	Notes
1997	Children of Eden	Donny	Paper Mill Playhouse, Millburn, New Jersey
1998	The Wizard of Oz		
1999	Mame		Paper Mill Playhouse, Millburn, New Jersey
2006	Landscape of the Body Donny		Signature Theatre, New York City
2007	The Dark at the Top of the Staris	Punky Givens	Transport Theatre Company at the Connelly Theatre, New York City.
2015	Mercury Fur	Lola	The New Group, New York City
2024	High Priest	Ondine	La MaMa Experimental Theatre Club, New York City
