= Wylde Pak =

American animated television series

- Genre: Comedy
- Created by: Paul Watling; Kyle Marshall
- Voices of: Nikki Castillo; Benjamin Plessala; Jee Young Han; Ben Pronsky; Jean Yoon
- Theme music composer: LIONCHLD, Feels Right Creative
- Composers: LIONCHLD, Feels Right Creative
- Country of origin: United States
- Original language: English
- No. of seasons: 2
- No. of episodes: 26

Production
- Executive producers: Paul Watling; Kyle Marshall; Seonna Hong; Conrad Vernon
- Running time: 22–23 minutes
- Production company: Nickelodeon Animation Studio

Original release
- Network: Nickelodeon
- Release: June 6, 2025 – present

Wylde Pak is an American animated television series created by Paul Watling and Kyle Marshall for Nickelodeon. Inspired by Watling and Marshall's personal family lives, the series revolves around half-siblings, Lily Pak and Jack Wylde, and their daily exploits as they adjust to their newly formed Korean American family. Set in the fictional town of Canyon Valley, the two often interact with fellow family members—father William Wylde, mother Min-Ju Pak, and grandmother Halmoni—and other residents around the town.

The series stars the voices of Nikki Castillo, Benjamin Plessala, Jee Young Han, Ben Pronsky, and Jean Yoon. It is the second original production following Rock Paper Scissors to originate from the Nickelodeon Intergalactic Shorts Program that was launched in 2019, and was first announced in March 2025 with a 26-episode order. Watling, Marshall, Seonna Hong and Conrad Vernon were attached as executive producers. It is produced by Nickelodeon Animation Studio and animated by Jam Filled Entertainment.

The series' first episode was released on YouTube on May 1, 2025, with the series officially premiering on Nickelodeon on June 6, 2025. A second season premiered on January 2, 2026.

== Premise ==
Wylde Pak follows half-siblings Lily Pak (Nikki Castillo) and Jack Wylde (Benjamin Plessala) as they navigate their evolving family dynamics, friendships, and hijinks within their newly formed Korean American family in the town of Canyon Valley.

== Characters ==
=== Main ===
- Lily Pak (voiced by Nikki Castillo) is a competitive and fun-loving 11-year-old girl and the half-sister of Jack. She likes to play games and hang out with her friends, including Anusha, Debs, and her half-brother Jack. She makes up part of the "L.A.D." friend group, where she excels at creativity and constantly makes funny faces.
- Jack Wylde (voiced by Benjamin Plessala) is an adventurous and shy 13-year-old boy and the half-brother of Lily. A former nomad who followed his mother Alice around the world, he moves into Canyon Valley for the summer. He likes to see the world through his camcorder and likes to record videos of the world around him.
- William "Will" Wylde (voiced by Ben Pronsky) is the father of Lily and Jack who shares Lily's fun-loving personality.
- Min-Ju "Min" Pak (voiced by Jee Young Han) is the energetic mother of Lily and the stepmother of Jack.
- Halmoni (voiced by Jean Yoon) is the mother of Min, and the grandmother of Lily and Jack, who has a caring, yet stubborn, personality.

=== Recurring ===
- Alice Kelly (voiced by Gillian Jacobs) is a famous documentarian traveling across the world who is Jack's biological mother. A nomad, she took Jack around the world before moving him to Canyon Valley for his own safety.
- Chuck (voiced by Jon Glaser) is the Wylde family's carefree and eccentric neighbor who always seems to "know a guy". He was a theater kid in his childhood.
- Anusha (voiced by Anita Kalathara) is Lily's best friend. She makes up part of the "L.A.D." friend group, where she excels in strategy.
- Debs (voiced by Alex Cazares) is Lily's best friend. She makes up part of the "L.A.D." friend group, where she excels in strength.
- Beef (voiced by Carson Minniear) is Jack and Lily's friend. He is the son of T-Bone (voiced by Mick Foley) and Patty (voiced by Becky Lynch), who run a gauntlet at their house to gauge visitors' physical strength.
- Ellie (voiced by Jordyn Weitz) is an eccentric seven-year-old girl who lives next door to the Wylde-Pak family. As the leader of a club revolving around ravens, she brings members around on investigations to Canyon Valley's mysterious individuals.
- Sammie (voiced by Mindy Sterling) is the proprietor of the sandwich shop Sammie's Sammies.

== Episodes ==
Although the show was produced under one production cycle, it is split and released under two separate seasons.

=== Series overview ===
Season	Episodes	Segments	Originally released	
Season	Episodes	Segments	First released	Last released
1	13	24	June 6, 2025	December 12, 2025
2	13	24	January 2, 2026	April 10, 2026

=== Season 1 (2025) ===
No. overall	No. in season	Title	Written by	Storyboarded by	Original release date	Prod. code	U.S. viewers (millions)
1	1	"Best Summer Ever?"	Brittney Jo Flores, Jenava Mie, Paul Watling & Kyle Marshall	Mark Galez & Jared Morgan; Paul Watling & Kyle Marshall (directors)	June 6, 2025 (Note: This episode was made available on YouTube on May 1, 2025.)	101	0.09
Lily Pak plans to turn her house's extra room—currently used for the family's pet grooming business, Wylde Pak Groom & Board—into her summer gaming den. However, her parents, William Wylde, and Min-Ju Pak, fail to buy a new shop space. Lily strikes a deal to relocate the business to their neighbor Chuck's trailer. Meanwhile, her half-brother Jack Wylde, who is on an expedition with his documentarian mother Alice Kelly, is sent to live with Lily's family for the summer for his safety and social growth. Jack ends up taking the room Lily wanted, sparking conflict. During a fight in the trailer, their grandmother Halmoni accidentally rolls downhill inside it. The trailer crashes, but she is unharmed. The family comes together to fix the trailer, and Lily and Jack reconcile.
2	2	"Sad, Single, and Stranded"	Adam Colás	Kevin Bailey; Nick Edwards (director)	June 13, 2025	102	0.04
2	2	"A Waste of a Perfect Summer Day"	Brandon Hoàng	Megan Fisher; Ari Castleton (director)	June 13, 2025 (Note: A sneak peek of this episode aired on May 31, 2025.)	102	0.04
Jack longs to get a good story now that he's in Canyon Valley, but does not know where to start. Will and Min-Ju offer him a tour of the Wylde Pak residence, but he is unable to find a good story there. However, he finally finds a good story when Lily accidentally spills boba on Jack's suitcase full of clothes and ruined them in her attempt to clean it off, covering it up as a burglary. However, Lily's conscience gets the better of her, and she admits it was her that ruined his clothes. Seeing her half-brother sad he was unable to get a good story, Lily allows him to stay at her room and gives him tips on popular places around Canyon Valley. Lily plans to tour Jack around the hotspots of Canyon Valley by looking at its history, cuisine, and recreational spots. Despite Lily's objections, Jack decides to take a shortcut to the museum, where he finds the entrance to an abandoned mineshaft. The mineshaft ends up leading them to their next location, Sammie's Sammies, where Jack is able to impress its owner, Sammie, by offering her a bottle of chili he obtained while in Mexico. Meanwhile, with the kids gone, Will and Min-Ju make dinner, but Will does not know exactly how much spice Jack likes on his food. Lily and Jack's last stop is The Rec, a park well-known amongst Canyon Valley's youth whose waters are "cursed" by a large fish colloquially known as "the beast". Lily and Jack are swallowed whole, but Jack throws a bottle of hot sauce at the fish's throat, making it spit them out. The two make it to the hill, but Jack, despite all the pictures he took of him and Lily, concludes that he did not get the big picture. Later that night, the family has dinner, with Jack liking the amount of spice. Will offers the kids a tour of the hill, but having just went there, they decline.
3	3	"Woori World"	Brittney Jo Flores	Nick Edwards & Bert Youn; Nick Edwards (director)	June 20, 2025	103	0.11
3	3	"Finding FlamingoFan85"	Adam Colás	Keith Pakiz; Bosook Coburn (director)	June 20, 2025	103	0.11
Five days after Jack has moved in, the local Asian shop Woori World has taken in a shipment of items from Jeju Island, including the highly-sought after cookies named Hallasand. As the cookies are in limited stock, the Wylde Paks prepare for the chaos that ensues, with Jack wanting to join in; he is tasked to be a decoy. The moment the shop opens, manic customers begin to trash the shop in the hopes of finding the confections. Each member of the family falls; Halmoni is locked in a battle with a rival of her age, Min is stunk out by the smell of a durian, Lily is cornered by a three-aunt hydra, and Will is hit by a bottle of gochujang sauce, leaving Jack all by himself. Seeing the chaos unfold around him, he resolves to get the hallasand himself. He saves Lily from the aunt hydra and calls the other Wylde-Paks into action, and he is able to grab the final box of hallasand after using himself as a decoy for the others. When a rival calls for the Wylde-Paks' disqualification, since Jack is not part of the family, Halmoni rebukes her, reiterating Jack's loyalty to the family. Having secured the hallasand, the family takes a bite and feels their souls leave their bodies due to the overwhelming taste. The Groom and Board has just received its first negative review, which specifically singles out Lily. This aggravates her and pushes her to track down the original poster, FlamingoFan85. As she gathers all the evidence she needs, Lily finds out that FlamingoFan85 has left a five-star review before at a restaurant called Poundcake Palace. Throughout the day, Lily goes off to interrogate Chuck and the waiters at Poundcake Palace and Canyon Coffee, only to find no leads. However, Lily overhears Jack talking about throwing a party for exotic pet owners, taking what he said as a suggestion to bring FlamingoFan85 to them. Later that night, however, the duo, only coming across an unrelated flamingo owner, end up finding no further leads, but eventually find a briefcase filled with stickers from the exact places FlamingoFan85 has reviewed before. The duo give chase, only to lose it and their way. Lily breaks down in tears, and Jack comforts her, telling her she can't please everyone. The duo soon stumble across a flamingo; they are able to find FlamingoFan85, where she praises her experience with the Groom and Board's treatment - specifically Lily's - of her pet flamingo (she only gives five stars to specific shops, where three is the maximum).
4	4	"Just a Little Pipe Problem"	Brandon Hoàng	Victor Courtright & Rose Feduk; Victor Courtright (director)	June 21, 2025	205	0.07
4	4	"Camp Chuck"	Eden Rousso	Megan Fisher; Ari Castleton (director)	June 21, 2025	205	0.07
Due to Lily and Jack's inaction doing the chores in the house, Will and Min find out that the Groom and Board is set to undergo a safety inspection very soon (which is later that day). However, the state of the trailer is far from acceptable, with a broken pipe complicating things further. Lily and Jack get to work helping around to fix the trailer; Jack is with Min at the hardware store, which had just been closed due to "safety violations" (really a minor sorting mistake) by the very strict safety director. Seeing how strict the director can get, Jack tries to render her car immobile, but finds out he immobilized the wrong target as she instead rides a motorcycle. Meanwhile, Lily tries to work on the floorboards, but ends up encountering a skunk. Jack and Min rush back, but are forced to take a shortcut after being held up by traffic, and Jack sacrifices himself to distract the director, handing Lily the pipe. As the director enters the trailer and carries out inspection, Lil finds out that very moment that the pipe is just too short, instead resorting to using her mouth as the extension it needs. The Groom and Board passes inspection, but Jack and Lily are worse for wear. One day, neighbor Chuck announces that he will be holding a theater camp for kids in his mission to save the local theater. Lily and Jack believe that he is holding a Ponzi scheme, so they sign up; Halmoni is also there as she is an esteemed theater actor in Korea. Chuck tells each kid they can act out whatever they want in the show; soon, rehearsals are underway, which does not go well. Lily and Jack watch as chaos unfolds; as the two search for food in his room, they find out Chuck was a theater kid in his past. Now feeling bad for him, Lily and Jack decide to take over directing duties, but Chuck pulls the two into his room once more where he tells them his story: as a kid, he indeed loved theater, but he had a strict director that crushed his spirit. Despite not rehearsing, the two, feeling bad for him, decide to partake in the show, which turns out to be a success. However, the theater collapses on itself.
5	5	"The Three Ravens"	Brandon Hoàng	Keith Pakiz; Bosook Coburn (director)	June 27, 2025	106	0.08
5	5	"Left Holding the Bag"	Alec Schwimmer	Mark Galez; Ari Castleton (director)	June 27, 2025	106	0.08
An unenthusiastic Lily and excited Jack follow their friend Ellie, the latter of whom acts like a raven, to the mysterious Mrs. Withers' house. However, Jack disappears, leaving Lily and Ellie behind. Their first mission to find Jack ends abruptly after being discovered by Withers herself, who they find out has amassed numerous creepy creations and tools, to the point she has made a mannequin of Jack that Lily mistakes for the real deal. Lily learns to embrace the way of the raven, which helps her and Ellie find Jack, who is now kitted out in a Little Lord Fauntleroy costume, and Withers, who is revealed to be a artist/sculptor. The three kids reunite, with Lily fully embracing the traits of the raven; later that night, Withers disposes of her trash, including the Jack mannequin, which begins to smile. Lily and Jack are listening to a true crime podcast, and are inspired to become criminals to land a spot on the show. They come across Chuck, who is dealing with a stinky duffel bag. The two kids are suspicious, but decide to help him, with Jack recording the escapade as they go. The duo make their first stop at a hardware store, where Chuck buys equipment for cleaning, duct tape, and a shovel; their second is to meet up with Chuck's friend Dirk, who hands him a location. Chuck drops the kids off at the side of the road, but does not return after hours. The kids decide to bury it; they briefly toy around with the idea of betrayal, but are interrupted by a bystander, who is shocked by the contents of the bag. Later that night, the duo meets up with Ellie, who gives them disguises to allow them to get away from Canyon Valley. Soon, the two are pursued by Chuck, who reveals that not only did he have to do everything himself, but he had left them behind to buy them corn dogs. On the way back to Canyon Valley, Chuck listens to Jack's recording, realizing that he does sound like a criminal in it.
6	6	"The Meatball of Canyon Valley"	Brandon Hoàng	Mark Galez; Ari Castleton (director)	July 11, 2025	110	0.15
6	6	"Sticky Fingers"	Sammie Crowley	Jared Morgan; Bosook Coburn (director)	July 11, 2025	110	0.15
Every year, Halmoni takes Lily to the annual Canyon Valley trot dance competition. However, this year, Lily does not feel the energy; instead, Jack, who has experienced trot in his time overseas, immediately acquaints himself to it. He immediately usurps Lily, who develops a tang of jealousy for her half-brother's skill. Halmoni benches Lily and takes Jack to the competition, where the dress he would wear would fit him perfectly, so Lily enlists the help of Chuck to sabotage the performance. As Jack and Halmoni prepare for their performance, Lily is spotted; she opens up her true feelings to Halmoni, who reassures her she would not be left out, and that she and Jack would be treated equally. Now feeling remorseful, Lily tries to call off the sabotage, but Chuck instead grabs Halmoni mid-performance, cutting it short. Lily decides to join Jack, but the judges give them a straight zero and disqualify them. The family reunites, and Lily and Jack are together playing a dance game as Halmoni puts up a picture of the tender moment. Grooming Charlie the monkey is a hard task for Lily and Jack, with the ape making a mess in the trailer and taking the two kids' stuff. Min asks the two to run some chores: Lil needs to clean up the equipment, while Jack is tasked to go downtown. However, Min passes the task over to a reluctant Lil. Jack remains insistent he take on the chore, but Charlie takes the necklace and runs into the sewers. Lil leaves Min a letter telling her of the kids' current whereabouts, and the two head down to the sewers. Meanwhile, Min unravels at the thought of leaving Jack out of activities, so Will has her knit. Lil and Jack track him to the mines, where misplaced things are lost forever. Charlie has obtained a mine cart, and the two attempt to chase him through the mines, but end up on the wrong side of a chasm. Lil almost slips and falls, but is saved by Jack, who decides to use the stalactites as a way to get across. They track Charlie into a room full of items he has stolen. When confronted by Lil, Charlie is remorseful, but the necklace is hanging by a thread at the end of the tracks. Min finds out the kids are in the sewers; despite Lil's concerns, Jack, wanting to prove himself, grabs the necklace, but it snaps, causing him to fall into the pool of water below him. The necklace is lost, and a heartbroken Jack swims back to land. Jack feels he has failed Min; when he and Min reunite, she reassures him he would always be her kid. As night falls, the family has ordered pizza, but Charlie snatches it and retreats to the sewers once more before Will can pay.
7	7	"Warriors Against the Realm"	Adam Colás	Sang Lee; Nick Edwards (director)	July 18, 2025	109	0.08
7	7	"Sungandeul"	John McKinnon & Kyle Marshall	Nick Edwards, Erin Kim & Sang Lee; Nick Edwards (director)	July 18, 2025	109	0.08
Lily needs someone to cover for her friend Anusha while she is unable to play the MMORPG dungeon crawler video game Warriors of the Realm. Jack volunteers to take Anusha's place; Lily warns him about the impending toxicity should he dive deep into the game. Lily chooses an overpowered hero, while Jack selects his at random, choosing an underpowered hero; the two are soon defeated by the enemies after Jack accidentally uses an emote. While Jack still does not grasp the gameplay mechanics, leading to many losses, he lets it get to his head, physically gaining the physique of an actual troll, and soon, he is smack-talking others in game. Lily brings him down to reality through giving him items, but even after winning, he still assumes a toxic demeanor, to the point Lily physically drags him out to make him touch grass. Jack admits that while he is adaptable, he concedes he did not have fun losing over and over again. He and Lily cleanse themselves, and both concede to continue playing the next day. This episode is a slice-of-life centric episode showcasing the exploits of the Wylde-Pak family throughout the day. As the day begins, Lily is playing a video game as Min informs her of a new petsitting job. She vows not to miss a cutscene, but it ends up being unskippable. Lily ends up breaking her TV and opening the door to Will, who left his keys. Min is cooking as Lily prepares for cricket tryouts. As Lily leaves for her tryouts, Jack returns to the smell of buttered chicken on ramen; his favorite. Jack prepares to voice call his mother Alice, as he notices Min saddened; he returns to the dining table, tablet in hand. Min prepares to go to the gym; after two outfit changes, she sees that Lily needs a ride to her friend Debs. Min is further inconvenienced by the lack of fuel, traffic, dropping Lily off and returning to drop her backpack off, and an old lady - the receptionist - driving rather slowly. Due to her card failing to scan, Min cracks and requests a day pass instead; she ultimately concedes defeat and treats herself to boba. As the others watch TV, Halmoni tries to sneak in a helping of spicy ramen. Will almost catches on to her, but the kids end up catching the smell of the ramen. Halmoni decides to share it with her family. Later, Will is on cleanup duty. As he works, he progressively becomes more incensed; however, he calms down when he sees Lily and Jack playing together. Lily asks him to record, and he does so, witnessing the tender moment. As night falls, Halmoni shows the kids a scrapbook with old pictures of her. Seeing this, she is determined to call her sister, who owes her $75. Lily comes across pictures of her and Jack as toddlers; when she calls out for her half-brother, he is not there. Jack is by the rooftop, looking at the night sky. He tells her that hearing Halmoni's stories made him think of his mother. Lily shows him a picture of her and Jack as toddlers; the two half-siblings look at the night sky above as Halmoni closes the episode, saying that there are two things that matter in life: family, "and paying up!"
8	8	"The Boba-Get"	Ari Castleton, Mark Galez & John Infantino	Mark Galez; Ari Casteton (director)	July 25, 2025	104	0.09
8	8	"Be Your Own Bean"	Kris Mukai	Jared Morgan & Lyle Nagy; Bosook Coburn (director)	July 25, 2025	104	0.09
Lily shows Jack her favorite boba place, the Boba-Get. However, it seems more desolate than usual; the café had been losing customers for a while, and Lily is now the only customer. This does not bode well for owner Mr. Bo, who cannot pay the rent, but Jack uses a mysterious lime from the Himalayas to create a new, tantalizing flavor, titled the Pucker Lime, that immediately seduces Mr. Bo. The drink soon goes viral, but Jack runs out of lime; he orders cartons of green lime, and Mr. Bo has now made enough money to pay the rent. However, a side-effect of the drink soon emerges, with their faces puckering up, and he is taken to court, where the judge orders that the Boba-Get be destroyed. Seeing this, Jack runs off to face the demolition crew himself, where he takes the fall for the defective drink. Lily joins in to defend her half-brother, but the crowd is not won over, but the green lime merchant from earlier gives everyone non-fat Greek yoghurt, balancing the sour lime and turning their faces back to normal. As a reward for saving the Boba-Get, Mr. Bo offers Lily and Jack free Pucker Lime, but they too begin to pucker up. After Halmoni compares her to her mother by pointing out she has been doing things very similarly, Lily becomes concerned and vows to do things her way.
9	9	"Meats of Strength"	Brandon Hoàng	Kevin Bailey; Nick Edwards (director)	August 1, 2025 (Note: This episode premiered on TeenNick on July 24, 2025.)	105	0.08
9	9	"Dead Ed's"	Adam Colás	Megan Fisher; Ari Casteton (director)	August 1, 2025	105	0.08
Jack is invited to a sleepover with his best friend Beef, but is not prepared for his family's onboarding tests of physical strength. Lily brings her family to Dead Ed's, the infamous eatery at Canyon Valley.
10	10	"The Secret of Lake Island"	Brandon Hoàng	Kevin Bailey; Nick Edwards (director)	August 8, 2025 (Note: This episode premiered on TeenNick on July 25, 2025.)	107	0.07
10	10	"Father, Son, and Furniture Store"	Adam Colás	Mark Galez, Erin Kim, Jared Morgan & Keith Pakiz; Bosook Coburn (director)	August 8, 2025	107	0.07
Lily invites Jack to an abandoned theme park that she calls home, but soon find themselves at odds with each other, threatening their friendship. After he asks his father for a new hammock, Jack is taken on a furniture store ride he - especially his father, who wishes to connect with him - would not forget.
11	11	"LAD"	Brittney Jo Flores, Bosook Coburn & Keith Pakiz	Keith Pakiz; Bosook Coburn (director)	August 15, 2025	108	0.11
11	11	"Before 10am"	Todd McClintock	Megan Fisher; Ari Castleton (director)	August 15, 2025	108	0.11
At the local arcade, Lily, Anusha, and Debs - LAD - beat rivals and perennial winners HB3 during the annual Gold Rush, only for their ringleader, Hank, to declare that LAD was using an exploit, and thus cheating. This sends the other competitors into a frenzied chase for the Gold Rush Prize, where LAD use their individual strengths - Lily creativity, Anusha strategy, and Debs strength - to outrun the others. When a bus intended to head to Dead Ed's takes them to the arcade, Lily accidentally surrenders the Gold Rush Prize to Hank, but the arcade's janitor blurts out that Hank's grandfather had rigged all the games in HB3's favor, causing the other competitors to turn against them. Jack is undercover as Johnathan Calm, investigating a water bottle factory as Lily sneaks in, intending to find out his secrets. She evades capture long enough she encounters Jack, working at the factory. The two of them hide in a tub filled with water tapped from a pure water spring; Jack is worried his investigation would amount to nothing should Lily intervene, but things get worse when she accidentally falls into the tub, contaminates it with her flatulence, and are soon cornered by security. Lily and Jack are able to barely escape, but are soon captured and brought to the CEO, Sloshwell, who intends to sell the now-fart-contaminated water to the public. After Jack reveals that he has been recording the whole conversation, Sloshwell lets them go under the condition they do not release the recording to the public.
12	12	"Mrs. Withers' Parables"	Adam Colás, Todd McClintock & Bert Youn	Kevin Bailey, Erin Kim, Justin Nichols & Bert Youn; Bosook Coburn, Victor Courtright & Bert Youn (directors)	October 3, 2025	207	0.10
Following a content disclaimer presented by Lily, Jack and Halmoni, Mrs. Withers introduces the viewer to four different scary stories revolving around the Wylde-Pak family. Claws: Lily and Jack take care of a hermit crab. When Jack finds out the crab is "dead" (in reality shedding its limbs), the two bury the crab with the pretext it is indeed dead. However, the two find out they instead buried it alive. The crab begins to stalk the two, culminating in a chase that sends them into the grave the crab dug for them, intending to bury them alive. Burger Broker: At Hank n' Beans, Lily and Jack discover a hidden cabinet titled Burger Broker. However, the moment they begin the game, lightning strikes the cabinet, bringing Lily and Jack into the game, where they meet other players and a chef who demands them bring it orders, lest they risk elimination. As the others fall, Lily and Jack are the last ones standing; Lily offers herself to the chef, who explodes with Lily coming out alive and winning the game for the two. Just as they are about to exit into the real world, however, Hank disconnects the machine. Toetal Eclipse: Min clips her toenails as one ends up flying off and disappearing; Halmoni reminds her that should she not watch where her nails go, rats would eat her toenails and become a copy of her. Min dismisses the concern; Will has kept all his toenails since before he married Min. Deep into the night, Min hears rats and goes outside to investigate, indeed, it is confirmed the next day that the rats are impersonating her likeness. Cornered, Min throws Korean red beans at the rat-Min, and a cat eats them and burps; the scent of which reverts the Min lookalike back to a rat. Her suspicions rise once more when she realizes another Will has appeared. Bread End: One dreary morning at the Wylde-Pak house turns upside down as Will finds a piece of toast with a frowny face on it, thinking it is an "omen from the Underworld". Min and Jack brush it off, but Lily eats it whole; she becomes possessed by the Toast Demon, who begins to attack everyone in its path. Will finds out that the Toast Demon can be exorcised from its vessel by performing a ritual circle with butter. The family goes out to buy butter; having lost Min and Jack, Will performs the ritual by himself, facing down the Toast Demon and exorcising it from Lily's body, but not before turning Will into a toast himself. Lily returns, unscathed, and eats the Will toast. The stories, indeed "all true", are being presented to the Wylde-Pak family, who approve of them, though the only one who has notes is Halmoni, who lets out a small fart.
13	13	"Where There's a Will, There's a Way"	Brittney Jo Flores & Jenava Mie	Kevin Bailey; Nick Edwards (director)	December 12, 2025	111	0.02
13	13	"Lost in the Sauce"	Jenava Mie	Keith Pakiz; Bosook Coburn (director)	December 12, 2025	111	0.02
Canyon Valley experiences a very hot summer day, the air conditioning in the house has broken, and the mechanics are not coming immediately. Taking refuge at the Groom and Board, Lily expresses the need to use the toilet, but cannot leave nor use it as she cannot use a nearby cat litter tray, and cannot go back to the house. Will sees two workers doing some work outside and decides to take matters to his own hands - refusing help from the others while they are experiencing the air conditioning in the trailer. Venturing into the basement to get to the HVAC unit, Will is immediately skunked but braves it; meanwhile, feeling peckish, the others find rations addressed for them; Jack finds an overheating turtle and takes it in as they resolve to check up on Will, who is close to insanity as he sees a surfer Santa and breaks down. Jack goes in, using a cushion of water to remain cool, as Will finds himself saved by the surfer Santa (in reality Jack, who has been hydrating him). Conceding he needs help, Will and Jack work together to fix the unit and fix the air conditioning, restoring coldness to the house. Halmoni returns from the bingo hall, which she says has the best air conditioning and all the shrimp they can eat. Night falls in Canyon Valley as Jack and Lily follow Ellie, who is on an investigation, to an "alien" sighting; she instead sights a group of cows, solving the mystery of where local farmer Huang's cows went. The following morning, she goes around her day; with her mother out on a work call, Ellie remains lonely at home. She spots Jack and Lily goofing off and pulls them into another mission; thie time they will be investigating Sammie, the eccentric owner of Sammie's Sammies, for her "mind-control sauce", much to the two's confusion. The two attempt to back out by suggesting a different case, and Jack suggests a vote, but Ellie insists they investigate Sammie. Ellie finds out the sauce is made of mayonnaise, mustard, and cumin, so nothing big; but she insists the sauce is made using a secret ingredient. Sammie kicks them out, and Lily attempts to back out of the mission, but Ellie spots the door to the store room by the back and deduces that is where she keeps the sauce. The three kids reenter, now stacking on top of each other to resemble an adult, and asks for the key to the back door - and again are they kicked out after the disguise fails on them. Now Ellie has the two distract Sammie while she plants listening bugs inside to figure out the real contents of the sauce. The two attempt to back out, which a saddened Ellie sees as an indication they do not want to be in the raven club anymore; she runs into the nearby dumpster and takes things into her own hands, sneaking in and planting the bugs herself. She barely makes it out undetected; Lily is shocked that a seven-year old is bossing her and Jack around, while the latter tells her they should not have left her behind. They go back for her; meanwhile, Ellie finds out that Sammie too prefers to be alone, with no one by her side, she breaks down, conceding she has to get their forgiveness, but tips her own presence off; Jack and Lily arrive in time to bail her out. Ellie confesses that seeing the two have fun makes her want to have such moments too as Sammie comes out of the backdoor; in a panic, Ellie shouts at her to not "mind-control" them, much to Sammie's confusion. It is revealed that Sammie has been keeping her family recipe book by the back, and it is just ginger ale that has been putting people in a trance. Ellie gives Sammie a card should she need her services, and leaves. The trio end up the day by playing board games together - and getting a chance to pick their next mystery.

=== Season 2 (2026) ===
No. overall	No. in season	Title	Written by	Storyboarded by	Original release date	Prod. code	U.S. viewers (millions)
14	1	"Journey to the Otter Side"	Jenava Mie & Eden Rousso	Victor Courtright, Sang Lee, Cat-Harman Mitchell & Keith Pakiz; Bosook Coburn & Nick Edwards (directors)	January 2, 2026	113	0.04
The halfway point of Jack and Lily's summer has arrived, with the former scheduled to be picked up on September 2. Lily wants to show Jack Lakeworld, which she hypes up as an extravagant theme park located outside Canyon Valley revolving around the sea - that is best seen with one's own eyes to appreciate. Jack is unimpressed by the iternary, which is topped off by a visit to Lily's favorite ride - Journey to the Otter Side - but Lily reassures him the pace will pick up as the day goes on; and she tops it all off with the Lakeworld theme song. Eventually, the family arrives in Lakeworld, only to find out it is far from what they remember it as; as Jack records, Lily finds out that the park is disheveled and run-down, the popcorn shrimp is now a Poundcake Palace, the fishdogs end up moist, the landmarks they are intended to go to all end up underwhelming - and there is a long line to the museum which is ultimately out of order. Topping it all off, much to Halmoni's dismay, is a new two-shrimp limit, and the Otter Side ride itself is out of order too. Lily breaks down, crossing paths with Jack, who is still recording; Jack's camera ends up being damaged, causing the two to swear off of talking with each other - much to the parents' shock. While examining footage, Jack picks up a secret code being sung by a performer - it may be their way into the ride after all. The two and Halmoni sneak into the park after hours and manage to unlock the secret amidst being trailed by a security guard. Reaching the ride, they are surprised by the jump in quality - and a literal drop which leads into a high-speed section of the ride that, by the end, gives them not only a good view of the whole park, which Lily now realizes is better than she remembers, but a section of the ride clearly designated unsafe which sends them barrelling through a section under construction. While the parents catch up to the guard, who is still looking for the kids, the pipes used during construction fall apart, launching them into the air and right into the lake. Now safe, Jack is excited, but Lily, now fully realizing her sibling relationship with him, breaks down again and confesses that she will miss him when he goes back. The two share an emotional hug and make it back to shore, reuniting with their parents and Halmoni, who has obtained a lot of popcorn shrimp - also Halmoni is now on the tail and needs to leave, quick.
15	2	"Basic Zipper Merging Etiquette"	Adam Colás	Mark Galez; Ari Castleton (director)	January 9, 2026	201	0.08
15	2	"How to Bag a Beast"	Brandon Hoàng	Erin Kim; Bosook Coburn (director)	January 9, 2026	201	0.08
The family heads home from Lakeworld, but immediately get stuck in traffic that appears to not be letting up any time soon. Lily and Jack set out to capture the fabled beast that roams the lakes of Canyon Valley.
16	3	"Follow the Sprinkles"	Frank Paiva, Nick Edwards & Sang Lee	Sang Lee; Nick Edwards (director)	January 16, 2026	112	0.09
16	3	"Canyon Valley V. Dirk"	Adam Colás	Megan Fisher; Ari Castleton (director)	January 16, 2026	112	0.09
Outraged her favorite ice cream truck is selling shaved ice instead, Lily launches an investigation that ends up uncovering a conspiracy that spans across Canyon Valley. After seeing Dirk be accused for a crime he did not commit, Min returns to her old job of being a lawyer to clear his name.
17	4	"Wrong Text"	Jordan Gershowitz	Kevin Bailey; Nick Edwards (director)	January 23, 2026	202	0.04
17	4	"Emergency Family Tribunal"	Todd McClintock	Megan Fisher & Cat-Harman Mitchell; Ari Castleton (director)	January 23, 2026	202	0.04
Jack gets a phone, then sends a text to the wrong person (Will), forcing him and Lily into an adventure across Canyon Valley to ensure his father does not see it. A piece of hallasand goes missing; Min puts the blame on Halmoni, but the others have different, conflicting accounts of what actually happened, making it hard for them to reach out to the truth.
18	5	"J-LAD"	Adam Colás & Ari Castleton	Mark Galez; Ari Castleton (director)	January 30, 2026	203	0.08
18	5	"Big Honey"	Brandon Hoàng	Erin Kim & Lyle Nagy; Bosook Coburn (director)	January 30, 2026	203	0.08
When Jack joins Lily's friend group, LAD, he leads the trio on a chaotic and scary heist at a teenager party to get some soda. After hearing that their grandparents are selling their bee farm to a massive corporation, Jack and Lily must team up to save the business.
19	6	"Caught Rubber-Handed"	Adam Colás	Keith Pakiz; Bosook Coburn (director)	February 6, 2026	204	0.08
19	6	"And... Action!"	Todd McClintock	Victor Courtright & Kevin Bailey; Nick Edwards & Victor Courtright (directors)	February 6, 2026	204	0.08
When Jack and Lily's reckless sticky hand playing cost Chuck his home, they are forced to offer him to stay at their place for a while. After discovering that their favorite K-drama is no longer filming its last episode due to a break-up, the family pitch in to shoot their own finale. However, with Lily as the director, she struggles to get everyone in line while Jack continuously offers they trade roles.
20	7	"Prison Break"	Leanna Dindal	Mark Galez; Ari Castleton (director)	February 13, 2026	206	0.09
20	7	"Canyon Valley Film Festival"	Brandon Hoàng	Megan Fisher; Ari Castleton (director)	February 13, 2026	206	0.09
After Halmoni grounds her family before the screening of their favorite action movie, they plan their great escape, which lead to bizarre consequences. Jack is ecstatic for the upcoming Canyon Valley Film Festival and rushes to find a film to make for it, but can't come up with any good ideas, which leads him to miss the submission deadline.
21	8	"Dubu"	Elizabeth Chun	Keith Pakiz; Bosook Coburn (director)	February 20, 2026	208	0.11
21	8	"Jack's Day Off"	Todd McClintock	Rose Feduk; Victor Courtright (director)	February 20, 2026	208	0.11
When Halmoni is reunited with her pet dog, Dubu, after she was forced to leave him behind when moving from her hometown, she attempts to run away with him, despite him now belonging to his new owners. Lily and Jack are forced to chase her down and stop her from leaving Canyon Valley. With their parents out to see a movie, Lily decides to have a day off, while Jack chooses to continue working at the Groom & Board. However, when he is forced to take care of lot of pets, including a snake, he tries his best to get them under control without disturbing the others.
22	9	"Summer Chuseok"	Brandon Hoàng	Erin Kim; Bosook Coburn (director)	February 27, 2026	209	0.15
22	9	"Putting Up with the Plovers"	Todd McClintock	Megan Fisher; Ari Castleton (director)	February 27, 2026	209	0.15
Lily wants to show Jack chuseok, the Korean tradition that is usually held in autumn - when in reality she wants to do it to get out of a dentists' appointment. Will hits it off, and wishes he didn't, with an annoying man who brings his equally-as-annoying family into the mix - and now he has to break up with them.
23	10	"The Real Woori World"	Adam Colás	Keith Pakiz; Bosook Coburn (director)	March 6, 2026	210	0.11
23	10	"The Collector"	Mayanna Berrin, Bryan Smith, Kevin Bailey & Victor Courtright	Kevin Bailey; Victor Courtright (director)	March 6, 2026	210	0.11
The Wylde-Paks return to Woori World, but each member gets lost in their own chaos! Jack searches for a rare DVD of his favorite movie, which leads him to a mysterious entity titled the Collector.
24	11	"Halmoni Learns the Internet"	Eden Rousso	Erin Kim; Bosook Coburn (director)	March 13, 2026	211	0.09
24	11	"The Library"	Brandon Hoàng	Rose Feduk; Victor Courtright (director)	March 13, 2026	211	0.09
25	12	"Date Night"	Adam Colás	Kevin Bailey; Victor Courtright (director)	April 3, 2026	212	0.15
25	12	"Behind the Jingle"	Todd McClintock	Mark Galez; Ari Castleton (director)	April 3, 2026	212	0.15
26	13	"Best Summer Ever!"	Adam Colás & Brandon Hoàng	Mark Galez, Megan Fisher & Keith Pakiz; Ari Castleton (director)	April 10, 2026	213	N/A

== Production ==
=== Announcement ===
In March 2025, Nickelodeon announced that a new animated comedy television series, Wylde Pak, had been picked up for a season of 26 episodes. It is the second original television series following Rock Paper Scissors (2024–2026) to originate from their initial Nickelodeon Intergalactic Shorts Program that was launched in 2019. Nikki Castillo, Benjamin Plessala, Ben Pronsky, Jee Young Han, Jean Yoon were announced to lead the voice cast. The series, created by Paul Watling and Kyle Marshall and inspired by their family lives, follows the everyday life of a newly formed multi-generational Korean American family. It is produced by Nickelodeon Animation Studio, and executive produced by Watling, Marshall, Seonna Hong and Conrad Vernon.

=== Conception ===
Watling and Marshall conceived an early version of Wylde Pak during their regular meetups at a Little Dom's restaurant. This version featured the characters, Lily and Jack, but had an added science fiction element. The pair wound up pitching the concept to Nickelodeon, whom responded well, particularly to Lily and Jack. The science fiction element was eventually dropped, and the two looked to their family lives as inspirations for what the show could be. A seven-minute pilot was produced as part of the Nickelodeon Intergalactic Shorts Program that was launched in 2019. According to Marshall, development was intense and the short looked and felt different from the final series, but the characters and family dynamics were identical.

Watling and Hong's marriage and the former's newfound role as a step-father to Hong's daughter served as the direct inspiration for the Wylde Pak's premise. Watling described his family life as poignant, as he himself grew up a step-child. Around the time the series was being conceived, Marshall also became a father. Watling, Marshall, and Hong's mission was the create a show that depicts a relatable and unsanitized picture of familial relationship. Hong noted that diversity and representation were an important part of the show. As the central family is multi-generational and culturally blended, several less common family dynamics tackled in animation had to be nailed down. As the series' target audience is children, episodes are mainly framed through the point of view of main characters, Lily and Jack. Other influences on the show include The Amazing World of Gumball (2011–2019), Freaks and Geeks (1999–2000), and My Neighbors the Yamadas (1999).

=== Animation and music ===
Wylde Pak is animated by Jam Filled Entertainment and its design was developed by art director, Ji Soo Kim. The creators sought for the series' style to reflect the messiness of familial relationships. The backgrounds consist of messier linework and no perfect angles. The characters are animated using Toon Boom Harmony and Jam Filled created a boiling outline which moves subtly in each frame. According to Marshall, the directing and boarding teams also influenced the series' look: "The compositions and backgrounds are dynamic and wonky, but what really makes it unique is the way our teams handle expressions and posing. Those boards influenced everyone down the line, from design and color to animation". The musical trio LIONCHLD created and composed the theme song and musical score.

== Release ==
Wylde Pak's first episode was released on YouTube on May 1, 2025, with the series officially premiering on Nickelodeon on June 6, 2025. The show was added to Paramount+ in Australia on September 3, 2025, with five additional episode segments: "Where There's a Will, There's a Way", "Lost in the Sauce", "Follow the Sprinkles", "Canyon Valley V. Dirk", and the half-hour "Journey to the Otter Side". The show was later added to Paramount+ in the United States in October 14, 2026.

== Accolades ==
Year	Award	Category	Nominee(s)	Result	Ref.
2025	Children's and Family Emmy Awards	Outstanding Children's or Young Teen Animated Series	Wylde Pak	Nominated	
2026	53rd Annie Awards	Best Animated Television Production for Children	"Sungandeul"	Nominated	
