= Kyle Marshall =

Canadian animator, director, storyboard artist and character designer

- Occupations: Animator, director, storyboard artist, character designer
- Years active: 2007–present
- Known for: The Loud House; 3 Amigonauts; Wylde Pak

Kyle Marshall is a Canadian animator, director, storyboard artist and character designer, best known for serving as a storyboard artist, supervising director, supervising producer, and co-executive producer on Nickelodeon's The Loud House. He served as a storyboard supervisor until Miguel Puga succeeded him. He later became the head director of the series after Chris Savino was fired for sexual misconduct allegations.

He worked on the show from Canada until moving to Los Angeles in 2015. He previously served as a storyboard artist and character designer on shows like Jimmy Two-Shoes and Grojband. He is also the creator of YTV's 3 Amigonauts and the co-creator of Nickelodeon's Wylde Pak.

== Career ==
He directed several episodes of The Loud House, along with series creator Chris Savino. In October 2017, he replaced Savino as the show's head director, who was fired from Nickelodeon for sexual harassment allegations.

== Works ==
=== Film ===
| Year | Title | Role | Notes |
|---|---|---|---|
| 2024 | No Time to Spy: A Loud House Movie | director | |

=== Television ===
| Year | Title | Role | Notes |
|---|---|---|---|
| 2009–11 | Jimmy Two-Shoes | storyboard artist character designer director (season 2) | |
| 2013–14 | Grojband | character designer | 11 episodes |
| 2014 | Fangbone! | director | 1 episode |
| 2016–17 | Atomic Puppet | storyboard artist director | 2 episodes |
| 2016–2023 | The Loud House | storyboard artist director supervising director writer supervising producer co-executive producer | |
| 2017 | ToonMarty | character designer | |
| 2017 | 3 Amigonauts | creator writer storyboard artist executive producer character designer | |
| 2025–present | Wylde Pak | Co-creator writer storyboard director executive producer | |
