= The Hard Times of RJ Berger =

2010 American television comedy

- Genre: Sitcom
- Created by: David Katzenberg; Seth Grahame-Smith
- Starring: Paul Iacono; Jareb Dauplaise; Kara Taitz; Jayson Blair; Amber Lancaster; Beth Littleford; Larry Poindexter; Marlon Young
- Country of origin: United States
- Original language: English
- No. of seasons: 2
- No. of episodes: 24

Production
- Executive producers: David Katzenberg; Seth Grahame-Smith
- Camera setup: Single-camera
- Running time: 22 minutes
- Production company: Wildbrain Entertainment

Original release
- Network: MTV
- Release: June 6, 2010 – May 30, 2011

The Hard Times of RJ Berger is an American television comedy created by David Katzenberg and Seth Grahame-Smith for MTV. The show's central character is RJ Berger (Paul Iacono), an unpopular sophomore at the fictional Pinkerton High School in Ohio who is macrophallically-endowed. Berger's two best friends are Miles Jenner (Jareb Dauplaise), whose ambitions for popularity cause him to clash with Berger, and goth girl Lily Miran (Kara Taitz), who has been lusting after Berger for several years. Berger's love interest is Jenny Swanson (Amber Lancaster), a cheerleader who is involved with Max Owens (Jayson Blair), a popular jock and bully. The show is presented as a coming-of-age story and has been described by Katzenberg and Grahame-Smith as a blend of the television series The Wonder Years and the film Superbad.

The pilot episode premiered on June 6, 2010, and the first season of 12 episodes concluded August 23, 2010. MTV renewed The Hard Times of RJ Berger for a second season, which premiered on March 24, 2011 and concluded on May 30, 2011, but canceled the show that August.

== Production ==
The Hard Times of RJ Berger originated from a short film with a similar premise titled The Tale of RJ, written and directed by David Katzenberg and produced by Seth Grahame-Smith. The Tale of RJ was described by The New York Times as "a short homage to Boogie Nights, about a well-endowed nerd" played by Christopher Mintz-Plasse. MTV executives were interested in developing scripted television series around the time Katzenberg and Grahame-Smith made their short film. In June 2009, MTV announced multiple series in development, including "Hard Times". It was described as "an irreverent half-hour coming-of-age series" in which unpopular fifteen-year-old RJ Berger becomes infamous when his "anatomical gift" is revealed to his school. Paul Iacono was cast as the title character that May.

Series creators Katzenberg and Grahame-Smith were the showrunners for both seasons, credited as executive producers. Grahame-Smith said "generally, David is concerned with visuals, running the set and designing the coverage, and I'm more concerned with making script changes and giving notes to actors, but those things cross-pollinate. I direct some episodes and David directs some episodes, but we're both there, every day. Even when we're not directing an episode, we have a couple directors that we really enjoy working with, on the series, and we're still involved, still bouncing things off the actors, and we're definitely making our presence felt, at all times, on set." The series was shot in a single-camera setup; each episode of the first season was shot in three and a half days, while each episode of the second season was shot in four days with two episodes being shot concurrently.

In regards to the content of the series, Grahame-Smith said that "it's an elevated, comedic world that this kid [RJ Berger] lives in, and he's surrounded by these absurd characters. He's surrounded by these archetypes, and he's the one semi-centered character in the middle of it all. I feel like, the more absurd that you are, the more you have to ground some things in reality. You have to earn that absurdity. Even though our show has one animated segment in every episode, even the live-action is like a cartoon, just with the way people carry on."

== Cast and characters ==
=== Main ===
- Paul Iacono as Richard Junior "RJ" Berger, the eponymous protagonist; a socially awkward but good-hearted 15-year-old high school sophomore. He is in love with Jenny Swanson, but was too shy to proclaim his love for her, as he is afraid of her boyfriend, Max. He is forced into the limelight when during a basketball game, his shorts fall down and his large penis is exposed. He was originally reluctant to date because his large penis once caused a girl to choke while performing oral sex on him. After being exposed, he decides to take advantage of his popularity to win Jenny over. In the season 1 finale, he agrees to have sex with Lily, out of guilt. He and Jenny start dating in the second season, though their attempts at intimacy are regularly foiled by Max and a vengeful Lily. He and Jenny briefly break up and he begins dating Amy, his tutor. In the second season, he struggles with the fallout of his parents' divorce and is shocked to discover that he is the father of Lily's baby.
- Jareb Dauplaise as Miles Jenner, RJ's comical, immature, overweight best friend. He is obsessed with becoming popular and scoring with girls; he appears to be an antithesis to RJ's moral values. He often carries a video camera with him. When he discovers RJ's secret, he encourages RJ to use it to become popular so he can become popular too. He has a frenemy relationship with Lily and is constantly insulting her physical appearance. He suffered a number of losses early in life, including the death of his mother and the "suicide" of his cat. He also has an older brother named Chet, who is shown to be a crazy Iraq War veteran. He lost his virginity to a substitute teacher which resulted in him catching crabs.
- Kara Taitz as Lily Miran, a socially awkward, and sex-obsessed girl who is infatuated with RJ and constantly chases him, much to his dismay. She has an unusual fashion sense and is frequently dyeing her hair; it is revealed that she makes her own clothes in episode 11. She and Miles constantly antagonize one another. RJ asks Lily to the school dance, much to her delight, but she was hit by a bus before the dance. Out of pity, RJ agrees to have sex with her. After she finds out RJ and Jenny are dating, Lily tries to sabotage their relationship at any cost. She and RJ eventually rekindle their friendship; she even sparks a friendship with Jenny. Lily briefly dates Hamilton but reveals to RJ that she is pregnant with his baby in the final minutes of Season 2, setting up for a non-existent Season 3.
- Jayson Blair as Max Owens, an arrogant and obnoxious school jock and RJ's main antagonist. After RJ stood up to him in the first episode, Max swore to humiliate RJ at all costs as a punishment. He was Jenny's boyfriend in the first season and is aware of RJ's crush on her, which makes him jealous. In the season finale, just as Max is about to fight RJ for kissing Jenny, Miles tackles him and starts punching him repeatedly in the testicles, giving RJ the chance to leave. When RJ and Jenny begin dating, he dates Robin Pretnar, Jenny's best friend and head cheerleader. In the second season, RJ discovers that Max is secretly gay and RJ agrees to keep his secret.
- Amber Lancaster as Jenny Swanson, RJ's primary love interest; a beautiful, popular, and down-to-earth cheerleader. She is impressed with RJ after he stands up to her boyfriend, Max, and by RJ's overall kindness. In the season finale, RJ and Jenny share a kiss before a concerned RJ returns to Lily's hospital bed. She and RJ begin a relationship in season two although they eventually break up, due to the fact they have no similar interests and Jenny was upset to find out that RJ lost his virginity to Lily. They agree to be just friends. They team up together to be Mr. and Mrs. Pinkerton, with little romantic tension.
- Beth Littleford and Larry Poindexter (season 2; recurring season 1) as Suzanne and Richard Berger, RJ's parents. They fail to level with their son and will sometimes embarrass him even when they try to make him feel better. They are also portrayed as sexually adventurous. At the end of the season 2 premiere, they tell RJ they are getting a divorce. Suzanne begins a relationship with Jeriba Sinclair until Rick shows back up and woos her with the poem he wrote the first time they had sex. Rick and Suzanne make up in the end of the second season, but it is unclear if they are back together.
- Marlon Young (season 2; recurring season 1) as Jeriba Sinclair, Pinkerton High's basketball coach and gym teacher; he is also RJ's guidance counselor, though he is very sarcastic and unsupportive and gives RJ questionable advice. He begins to date Suzanne after she and Rick separate in the season 2 premiere, much to RJ's disgust. However, as he dates Suzanne, he is much kinder to RJ. Jeriba eventually asks Suzanne to marry him, but she leaves him to get back together with Rick. Afterwards, he resumes bullying RJ.

=== Recurring ===
- Crystal Reed as Renee (season 1), one of the mean girls of college, with whom Miles flirted when she needed him to teach her how to act to have a main role in a theater piece
- Ciena Rae as Robin Pretnar, Jenny's best friend and fellow cheerleader. She is the object of Miles' affections, much to her disgust. After he spread a rumor that he motorboated her breasts, she beat him up. She becomes Max's girlfriend in season two and claims to be the status of the school's "queen bee". She is cruel, snobbish, and domineering towards the other cheerleaders except Jenny. Max breaks up with her when he overhears her calling him stupid.
- Caitlin Crosby as Amy, RJ's math tutor, introduced towards the middle of season 2. She has a "geek-chic" vibe, and is relaxed and down-to-earth. RJ is assigned to be tutored by her when his grades drop, and chemistry between the two develops. RJ asks her out to a Weezer concert, and they kiss. They eventually have sex, but she becomes jealous when she finds out that RJ and Jenny are running for Mr. and Mrs. Pinkerton together. However, she forgives RJ when he proclaims his love for her.
- De'Vaughn Nixon as Hamilton, a "gangster" student who first appears in Season 1 as a one-time character, and then becomes a recurring one in Season 2 when he starts dating Lily after they meet in school therapy. He is extremely smart (having an IQ of 170), and is actually very nice.
- Adam Cagley as Kevin Stern, an overweight, indolent nerd who is acquaintances with RJ and Miles although neither can stand him. He uses a mechanical chair to move himself. He is also a member of the Model United Nations Club. When RJ and Miles fight, he becomes Miles' new best friend temporarily. At the season 2 premiere, in which he had died when his scooter accidentally crashed in a donut shop window, he was revealed by RJ to be adopted by a black couple at his funeral.

=== Guest ===
- Lori Alan as Linda Robbins
- Vered Blonstein as goth girl
- Kristopher Higgins as Mario
- JC Gonzalez as dancer with dagger
- Justin Cone as Guillermo
- Salar Ghajar as Trent
- Jim Hanna as Bill Robbin
- John Colton as Mister Levy
- Albert Kuo as Asian kid
- Chanel West Coast as Sheila

== Episodes ==
=== Series overview ===
Season	Episodes	Originally released	
Season	Episodes	First released	Last released
1	12	June 6, 2010	August 23, 2010
2	12	March 24, 2011	May 30, 2011

=== Season 1 (2010) ===
No. overall	No. in season	Title	Directed by	Written by	Original release date	US viewers (millions)
1	1	"Pilot"	David Katzenberg	Seth Grahame-Smith	June 6, 2010	2.6
Socially awkward RJ Berger has to play in a basketball game when several of the team members get ejected from the game. He is forced to put on an oversized uniform and when his pants fall down, his large penis is exposed to the whole school. His friends Miles and Lily are shocked and RJ explains that he never told anyone because once when he tutoring a Japanese exchange student, she choked on his penis in an attempt to perform oral sex on him. However, his large penis gives RJ a sudden popularity. He and Miles attend Lily's pool party where his longtime crush Jenny is. Max becomes jealous of RJ and punches him, but RJ finally has the courage to stand up to him. He humiliates Max by pulling out his penis, rubbing his hand on it and smearing his hand on Max's face. Miles, RJ, and Lily leave the party with RJ thinking that things are starting to turn around for him.
2	2	"Yes We Can't"	Ryan Shiraki	Eric Siegel & Eric Wasserman	June 14, 2010	1.172
When RJ's proposition to the Student Government Association for Computer Club funding is denied, he decides to run for S.G.A. president. RJ tries to gain votes with little success. Max approaches RJ and promises to give the Computer Club funds in exchange for RJ pulling out of the race. RJ refuses and shows a video depicting how cruelly the jocks run the school in an attempt to turn votes against Max. Max retaliates by buying everyone copies of The Beatles: Rock Band and brings out his "second cousin by marriage" Travis Barker to impress students. Max wins, much to RJ's disappointment. RJ is pleased to notice that Jenny supported his campaign and he becomes hopeful that she might like him back. Guest star: Travis Barker as himself
3	3	"The Berger Cometh"	Anton Cropper	Eric Siegel & Eric Wasserman	June 21, 2010	0.834
When Jenny can not make the "study buddy sessions" with RJ due to her trying out for the school play (a mashup of Twilight and West Side Story), RJ auditions for the play to get closer to her. RJ lands the lead role along with Jenny and is pleased to find out that they share a kiss in the climax. On opening night, RJ worries about getting an erection during the kiss so Miles duct tapes RJ's penis to his leg but the plan fails. Everyone laughs at RJ for having an erection but Jenny forgives him.
4	4	"Here's to You, Mrs. Robbins"	David Rogers	Mathew Harawitz	June 28, 2010	0.895
RJ gets invited to Jenny's Sweet 16 Birthday party and Miles is upset that RJ isn't taking him. RJ struggles to find a gift and decides to buy Jenny an expensive present so his mother suggests he work for Mrs. Robbins as a handyman. His work is extremely demanding and Miles gets angry at RJ for missing a screening of Raiders of the Lost Ark after promising he would go with him. Miles declares their friendship to be over and makes Kevin his new best friend. RJ continues to work at the Robbins' household where Mrs. Robbins attempts to seduce RJ. Panicked, RJ locks himself in the bathroom and phones Miles for help. Miles comes to the rescue, and drives RJ to the party. RJ is left without a present but Miles reveals that he saved the portrait of Jenny that RJ drew. They become friends again and at the party, Jenny tells RJ that she loves the drawing. Guest Starring: Lori Alan as Linda Robbins
5	5	"The Rebound"	Anton Cropper	Dan Fybel & Rich Rinaldi	July 5, 2010	0.799
RJ goes through a regular day until he notices Jenny breaking up with Max over a pair of panties that were found in Max's locker. Miles and RJ both see the opportunity that has arisen and RJ decides to go for Jenny after she asks RJ if she can book a few more "Study Buddy Sessions" with him. He agrees and tries his best effort to get Jenny to notice him. The next day, Max corners RJ and confides in him that the rumors of Max cheating on Jenny are false and that the panties were planted. As a result of Jenny and Max not being together, Max has not missed a shot in basketball yet and the team has been on a winning streak. When RJ goes to Coach Sinclair, he notices that the same type of panties are in Coach's drawer and finds out that Sinclair planted them so Max can concentrate on basketball. When Jenny and RJ go for another session, he eventually tells her the truth and they both go to school, where Jenny goes back to Max, thus costing the team the game.
6	6	"Over The Rainblow"	David Rogers	Paul Ruehl	July 12, 2010	0.885
When Rick finds RJ staring at pictures of Jenny, he tells RJ that he's aiming at too high of a goal and should start lower first. RJ takes that to note and introduces himself to British-Indian transfer student Claire. Lily is mad about this and tries to tell Claire to stop seeing RJ, until she notices a Purity Ring on her finger. RJ is depressed about this until Miles tells him about "Rainbow Parties" that the purity club has where they all have various sexual acts other than intercourse, thus still being pure while acting out on sexual urges. RJ soon joins the purity club to get close to Claire. When Claire takes RJ to the Purity Club meeting, he is bored at first until a punchbowl filled with different colored lipsticks are passed around and Claire discovers the club's true intentions and starts to walk out. It turns out that Claire had no idea about it all and finds out that RJ only joined to be near her. She finds this sweet and kisses RJ.
7	7	"Tell and Kiss"	Ryan Shiraki	Mathew Harawitz	July 19, 2010	0.935
RJ's new relationship with Claire goes smoothly, but RJ wants it to progress even faster. Desperate to try to get Claire to perform sexual acts for him, he implies several innuendos but it seems that she is clueless as to his intentions. The next day, to appear cooler than he is to the jocks, RJ spreads the rumor that Claire had given him a 'tug-job' and is later in a frenzy as to make it true. Miles on the other hand, spreads the rumor that he "motor-boated" a girl's boobs and it spreads like wildfire. Unsure as to how to coerce Claire to give him a handjob, Lily suggests that he just be forward to Claire. Taking that advice to heart, RJ does and Claire submits to his asking and performs a handjob to him. Elated as that is his first sexual act to him. When the rumor that Miles spread comes to the girl in question's ears, she seeks out Miles and says that she will beat him up for spreading the rumor after school. Miles attempts to defend himself but it is useless. After the vicious beatdown, Claire comes up to RJ and confronts him about the rumor he spread about her giving him a 'tug-job'. Claire then punches RJ in the stomach and says he should never talk to her again.
8	8	"Nerds Gone Wild"	Jeff Melman	Dan Fybel & Rich Rinaldi	July 26, 2010	0.993
RJ and Miles plan on having a regular weekend until his parents tell him they got a babysitter since they are leaving for the weekend. RJ and Miles complain initially until they see that she is incredibly hot and are instantly enthusiastic. Suzanne and Rick say that they can have a party while they are away but not to make it too large and out of hand. Miles suggests that they have a large party but RJ says he wants to take a shot with her. Jenni the babysitter drives RJ to school with Max noticing and getting jealous immediately. RJ attempts to get Jenni to notice her to no avail. Eventually, RJ and Miles throw a party but no one gets too excited since it consists mostly of nerds. Jenni spices up the party with loads of alcohol and the party gets a little out of hand at first, with Jenni and RJ getting a little hot and heavy and with Miles and Lily getting angry at each other. Jenni, clearly intoxicated, starts hitting on RJ and says she wants to be alone with RJ. He attempts to vacate the party until Max and his friends, along with many more people show up to hijack RJ's house party. RJ tries to keep everything under control and becomes mad that the jocks are circling around Jenni. RJ tries to integrate then Jenni says that his mom called and are on their way home early. RJ quickly disperses the party and tries to clean up in a half hour, leaving Miles and Lily to clean up the bedrooms, while they constantly fight, leading them to preemptively kiss. RJ cleans up the living room with 5 minutes to spare, with Jenni waking up hung over, and wanting RJ. She give RJ and ultimatum of having sex with her now or never. They attempt to do so until they walk in on Miles and Lily and proceed to vomit on them and Suzanne and Rick who just came in.
9	9	"It's All About the Hamiltons"	Jeff Melman	Story by : Tremor Temchin; Teleplay by : Kevin Chesley & Bryan Shukoff	August 2, 2010	1.040
RJ wakes up having a wet dream about him and Jenny. Later on, RJ develops a headache and takes many tablets of aspirin with him to school. After he gets sent to the Principal Haggerty's office to discuss about a party RJ held in a previous episode, RJ pops an aspirin to calm his headache when Haggerty thinks its illegal drugs and promptly sends RJ to detention. Miles tells Lily that she will never get with RJ since she isn't a cheerleader, giving Lily the idea to try out for cheerleading. While in detention, RJ meets Hamilton, the leader of the thuggish detention regulars and befriends them, with them under the impression that RJ is tougher than he looks. Afterwards, Hamilton announces to the school that RJ is part of their crew and not to be messed with. Miles is excited about this opportunity, unlike RJ, who reluctantly goes along with his newfound respect and Miles takes advantage of the situation. RJ divulges to Jenny that it was aspirin that he took and not illegal drugs. Lily tries desperately to be a cheerleader but cannot successfully pull off most of their moves. Hamilton coerces RJ to pull a chair out from underneath a teacher and soon notices that he has more power than he realizes and attempts to stand up to Max. Max doesn't want to hurt his shooting hand for the upcoming basketball game, says he's gonna beat up RJ anyway until he notices some of Hamilton's crew. Max says he will get RJ eventually and leaves. Hamilton says that he will protect RJ if he wants it since he considers RJ as one of their own. Lily, with tips from Jenny, tries her routine for the cheerleading tryouts again, only to end up in embarrassment. RJ tells Miles that Hamilton is gonna "take care of Max" and Miles says it's not what RJ thinks it is. Thinking Max is going to be killed, RJ tries to stop the situation which is to be a nail gun accident, only to have the gun fall and spray nails all over with one nailing Max's shooting hand to the wall, causing Max to whine like a little girl. Hamilton says he was going to nail Max's backpack to the ceiling and Max gains loads of sympathy from the jocks and Jenny. RJ tells Hamilton he can not be in his crew and Lily says Jenny isn't so bad. Max tells the jocks that RJ is the only culprit and implies that he must pay. The episode ends with RJ saying crime doesn't pay.
10	10	"Behind Enemy Lines"	David Katzenberg	Seth Grahame-Smith	August 9, 2010	0.923
Max gets revenge on RJ from him nailing Max's hand to the wall with Jenny coming to the rescue. Miles records the incident and uploads it to the internet. Rick and Suzanne meet Jenny for the first time when she comes over for a study session. RJ is hopeless in helping Jenny get a higher grade in Biology since he can not concentrate when he's near her. Miles and Lily suggests that RJ cheat and steal the answers to the upcoming test. Miles suggests that they use his brother Chet to help out since Chet is an Army Veteran. After they are shocked that Chet pulls a gun on the two of them, they calm him down saying they have a mission for Chet. Chet agrees to the "mission" and initially says they should kill the teacher who holds the answers. Miles and RJ try to stop that idea until Chet says that he was messing with them. Later, RJ asks Coach Sinclair if it's alright to do something wrong to get to a girl. Coach says there is no right or wrong to get a girl, leaving RJ no choice but to steal the answers. Miles informs RJ and Lily that the whole class knows that they are gonna get the answers and RJ tells Jenny to come over an hour later. Chet distracts the teacher by cutting off the power with Miles and RJ sneaking through a back window. While trying to find the answers, RJ knocks over an object, making a noise loud enough to get the teacher to notice. Chet takes desperate measures and ends up having sex with the teacher, allowing Miles and RJ to grab the answers and escape. Afterwards, RJ develops a guilty conscience and decides not to use the sheet and to take the test honestly and teach Jenny honestly. Miles decides to share the test answers and the rest of the class fails the test, apparently having the wrong sheet while Jenny and RJ both get A's. Miles then gets a beating from Patterson while RJ records the video and says it's going online.
11	11	"Lily Pad"	David Katzenberg	Paul Ruehl	August 16, 2010	1.143
The Winter Formal at Pinkerton High looms with RJ and Miles finding it difficult to get dates. As almost every girl in the school rejects them after asking, RJ decides that the one he should go with is Lily, who has been by him since childhood. RJ asks Lily to go with him and she gleefully accepts, planning on finally having sex with RJ. A short time afterwards, RJ notices Max breaking up with Jenny for an unknown reason and potentially sees an opportunity to finally get Jenny to notice him. Miles however, asks Robin to go with him to the dance and she sarcastically accepts, leaving Miles to believe she was sincere. Jenny tells RJ that she and Max are done and wants to go to the dance with RJ. RJ becomes confused as who he should go with and asks Coach Sinclair what he should do. Sinclair tells RJ that it may be tough for Lily to accept, but with his only opportunity with Jenny in sight, he should go for Jenny while he can. RJ eventually tries to tell Lily the bad news, until Lily accidentally walks into the street with a school bus crashing into her as she asks RJ "What is it my lo..."
12	12	"The Right Thing"	David Katzenberg	Seth Grahame-Smith	August 23, 2010	1.288
The aftermath of Lily getting hit by a bus leaves RJ in shock and grief stricken at the hospital. Everyone tells RJ that he should go to the dance and not worry too much about Lily. Eventually, RJ takes Jenny to the dance. When Miles goes to Robin's house to take her, she asks what he's doing there and she tells him that she was being sarcastic when she said 'yes' to him. Embarrassed, Miles leaves as he notices that Max shows up, apparently taking Robin to the dance. As they arrive, RJ can only think of Lily, who is in a coma at the hospital. RJ leaves the dance hall, and sobs with Jenny finding RJ and kissing him. Even though RJ wants that, he tells her he needs to be by Lily's side and begins to leave the school. Max attempts to stop RJ and tries to beat him up, over the fact that he is jealous of RJ taking Jenny, when Miles tackles Max and starts pummeling Max's testicles, allowing RJ to leave. RJ goes to Lily and says he's sorry about the night. Lily wakes up and says the night can still be special. RJ strips down and the two have sex in the hospital bed. RJ leaves the hospital with Lily having a smile on her face and a heart monitor flatlines with some of the hospital staff rushing, implying Lily is dead.

=== Season 2 (2011) ===
No. overall	No. in season	Title	Directed by	Written by	Original release date	US viewers (millions)
13	1	"RJ's Choice"	David Katzenberg	Paul Ruehl	March 24, 2011	3.1
The students are at Kevin Stern's funeral after his scooter crashes through the window at a doughnut shop when Lily comes, on crutches due to her pelvis being broken and RJ has a choice to make. When Miles tells RJ to picture his life with Lily and then life with Jenny, he decides to tell Lily the truth about Jenny and him. Coach Sinclair holds a fundraiser to help fix the school bus that hit Lily. RJ is mad about this and holds a fundraiser of his own to help pay Lily's medical bills. Max, who wants to settle the score with Miles for beating Max's testicles repeatedly at the dance, cannot beat Miles publicly so Coach Sinclair signs both of them up for a sumo match. During the class Jenny and Max get into a conflict by telling her that he already had sex with Rebecca. After that Jenny immediately kisses RJ to make Max jealous. During the match, Miles gets the upper hand momentarily until Coach Sinclair trips Miles and Max finishes him off to win. RJ tells Lily that he took Jenny to the dance and that they kissed, and that he must take his shot with her. Lily, who is distraught by this, hits RJ with one of her crutches and declares that RJ is "dead to her" and storms out of the gym while wrecking the fundraiser booths. As they leave Miles tells RJ not to worry too much about Lily, and they both decide that RJ should focus on being with Jenny. In the end, Suzanne and Rick tell RJ that they are getting a divorce.
14	2	"Cousin Vinny"	David Katzenberg	Elizabeth Tippet	March 28, 2011	1.37
Cousin Vinny, RJ's cousin, comes to visit to help RJ and his mom move to a new apartment. Vinny later teaches RJ and Miles to look cool for girls. This helps RJ, who had asked Jenny to go out on a date earlier that week. Max hates the idea of Jenny going on a date with RJ and plans on making it as miserable as possible for Jenny and RJ. While at the restaurant, Vinny and Miles stay in the lobby while Jenny and RJ eat dinner. Max stops by and tells RJ and Jenny that this is his place and that they should leave. The last straw for RJ comes when Max throws a piece of bread into Jenny's soup and RJ stands up to Max and attempts to smooth things over with him. When Max tries to hit RJ, the restaurant manager (whom Miles, RJ and Vinny met earlier) knocks Max out and into a salad bar and tells Max and his buddies to lay off of RJ. Vinny and Miles come over and ask if Jenny and RJ want to leave. At the end of the episode RJ and Jenny kiss. Guest star: Vinny Guadagnino (from Jersey Shore)
15	3	"The Lock-In"	Ryan Shiraki	Bryan Shukoff & Kevin Chesley	April 4, 2011	1.22
RJ and Jenny go to a lock-in at the school, where it is widely known amongst the students to be a "School Sponsored Orgy". Once there, Miles finds out that Lily plans to sabotage RJ and Jenny from sleeping with each other and Miles locks Lily in the bathroom to stop her. Afterwards, Miles distributes chocolate biscotti that he stole from his brother Chet to everyone but RJ, who is allergic to chocolate. Jenny and RJ sneak off to the Science Lab to be alone. Everyone in the gym who ate the biscotti starts to hallucinate since the biscotti is apparently laced with drugs from Afghanistan. Jenny, who is also affected, pulls off her panties in order to RJ to have a glimpse of her beautiful vagina and then tries to give RJ oral pleasure while also trying to lose her virginity to him but passes out instead. Everyone in the gym, including Coach Sinclair, starts to freak out from the drugs and attempts to flee the school but can not due to the doors being locked. RJ appears and opens the doors, letting everyone leave the school while he carries Jenny out and to the football field. As morning comes, Jenny wakes up on RJ's lap and he tells her what happened during the previous night. Jenny promises RJ that the two soon will have their sexual intercourse. They leave the field with the sprinklers coming on and everyone else starts to recover from the drug-laced biscotti. Guest star: Paris Hilton
16	4	"Ugly Jenny"	Ryan Shiraki	Niki Schwartz-Wright	April 11, 2011	1.06
Jenny comes to school in a depression when she reveals that she has a zit, for the first time. Jenny is very upset about this after Miles tells her it won't go away in time for her cheerleader picture. Meanwhile, Lily gains a large sum of cash after her settlement money comes in from her accident, allowing her to buy her popularity from the jocks. This puts her at odds with RJ, while Miles ends up becoming her personal assistant. RJ tries his best to comfort Jenny with her zits, but ends up hurting her feelings. Lily comes to the realization that Robin is only using her to buy her expensive items like jewelry and make-up and finds Jenny in the bathroom sobbing to the fact that she has many more zits than before. Lily gains some sympathy for Jenny and tells RJ about Jenny and they come up with a plan to sneak her out of the school. Lily, Miles, RJ and Jenny grab the mascot costume and attempt to sneak out, Breakfast Club-esque style. Miles runs a diversion, leaving Jenny and RJ to sneak off to his house. While Jenny and RJ kill time there, Lily discovers Robin placed some cream in Jenny's make-up to give her zits. Lily hates this and places some of that cream in her make-up and gives it to the other cheerleaders, embarrassing them completely for their cheerleading photo.
17	5	"Deadliest Crotch"	Seth Grahame-Smith	David Katzenberg	April 18, 2011	1.231
RJ's grade starts to suffer due to his life crumbling around him. Jenny tries to tell RJ that her parents are out of town for the weekend and says that she wants to lose her virginity then. Meanwhile, Miles gets into trouble with the hot substitute math teacher and has to stay after class. When RJ and his parents come to a parent teacher conference with Coach Sinclair, it is decided that RJ gets a tutor to help. RJ meets up with his tutor Amy and is shocked at how hot she is and fantasises about her. Amy calls her on it and he tells her what is happening in his life. Miles heads to the substitute's room and she ends up wanting to have sex with Miles. Stunned, Miles tells RJ the good news and has sex with her the next day in the janitor's closet. Jenny tries to tell RJ about the weekend then she meets Amy and leaves before she can. Amy asks RJ why Jenny is with him and he can not come up with an answer. Later on, Miles pulls a bug from his crotch and RJ tells him that it's a crab. In denial, Miles ends up grabbing another and admits that he does have crabs. Miles then comes to the conclusion that he will shave off his pubic hairs in order to have sex with the substitute again but later vows not to have sex again with her and tells her that they are through. Jenny tries to ask Lily what it's like to have sex and Lily ends up telling her that she and RJ had sex. RJ tells Miles that he has doubt about him and Jenny but Miles reassures him. Lily comes up to RJ, telling him that she told Jenny about RJ and her. Jenny soon follows and says that RJ is not who she thought he was. Jenny leaves with RJ in a depression.
18	6	"Saving Dick"	Seth Grahame-Smith	Tremor Temchin	April 25, 2011	0.896
RJ's relationship with Jenny is suffering over RJ not telling her about him and Lily. RJ tries to ask his dad for help but Rick appears to be very delusional. Amy provides RJ with advice about his parents divorce and RJ gets her to help give Rick a makeover. RJ thanks Amy for her help, but Amy asks why he didn't ask Jenny for her help and RJ says he doesn't want her to see his dad like that. Lily attends a student bonding club which helps her with her innermost feelings, until Miles joins in and ruins her ability to heal from her emotional wounds. Later on, RJ tries to soothe things over with Jenny but she rejects him before he can get enough in. Miles tries to get close to the support group leader Katie while Lily gets close to the thug Hamilton, who appears to have an attraction towards Lily. Katie reveals to Miles that she used to have a very sexual side to her and Miles attempts to rekindle that state. Afterwards, Rick appears and tells RJ and Miles that he is the new substitute English teacher. The next day, Miles attempts to make a joke about Lily in the group but Hamilton defends Lily, then Miles is asked to leave the group. In the English class where Rick is teaching, he calls on RJ and Jenny to act out "Romeo and Juliet" to not only demonstrate it, but try to help them rekindle their romance. Rick inadvertently gives RJ the idea that Jenny and he are only meant to be friends and they both agree that they should go back to the way they were so RJ doesn't hurt her again. Later that night, Amy video chats RJ and says that he owes her one. Suzanne comes by and says she's going out with someone. When RJ asks who, she reveals that she and Coach Sinclair are starting a relationship.
19	7	"You, Me, and Weezer"	Ryan Shiraki	David Katzenberg & Tremor Temchin	May 2, 2011	0.771
RJ wakes up to see Suzanne and Coach Sinclair the day after their night out. RJ saddens her when he asks her why she isn't speaking to Rick. Sinclair says to RJ that he's genuinely into Suzanne and plans on making a relationship with her. At school, Lily and her new boyfriend Hamilton have tickets to the Weezer concert that's coming into town and RJ thinks that is the perfect way to get Amy to notice him. Things go well until Amy points out that the show is for people over 21. Desperate for fake IDs, RJ asks Coach Sinclair for help getting them in exchange RJ tells Coach Sinclair what to give Suzanne as a special gift. Despite the address being in a shady part of town, RJ and Miles go up to the house and knock on the door, asking for 'Fidel'. The thuggish man who answers the door pulls RJ and Miles in. RJ and Miles say that Coach Sinclair sent them and they attempt to get the IDs until the cops show up. RJ grabs the box of IDs as they both head out the back door and a montage of the boys enjoying the new IDs. RJ shows Amy the new IDs and is excited to go to the sold out show, which is what RJ had no idea about. Desperate to get tickets, RJ can not seem to come up with a way to get tickets, until Coach Sinclair comes through with them and RJ admits that his mom is allergic to tulips and Sinclair admits he called the cops on the house they were in. When attempting to get in, Max shows up and foils RJ, Miles and Amy's plan to get in. While the show goes on, RJ finds a way into the back lot and sneaks into the show in an instrument case, only to be stopped by the bouncer he met earlier that threw the three out initially. RJ tries to reason with the bouncer and Weezer appears and overhears that RJ did this all for Amy. Weezer sympathizes with him and agrees to let him in on the stage. Weezer comes back in for an encore and dedicates the song "Hang On" for Amy and RJ and nerds everywhere. RJ notices Jenny in the audience and they wave to each other. Lily and Hamilton make out during the show and Amy turns to RJ and gives him a kiss. Guest stars: Weezer
20	8	"Give Me a P"	Ryan Shiraki	Seth Grahame-Smith	May 9, 2011	0.872
RJ has a dream about him and Sinclair in an 'Inception' based sequence which has RJ telling Sinclair to stay away from Suzanne. After RJ wakes up and has breakfast, Suzanne tells RJ it's her and Rick's 20th anniversary, prompting her to ask RJ to have a night to themselves. When RJ gets to school, Miles says he has had enough of himself being overweight and decides to lose some weight, although RJ is extremely skeptical about this. Later, Rick asks RJ to be with him on the anniversary night and RJ agrees, leaving him double-booked and confused as to what to do. Miles decides that the best way for him to both lose weight and get girls to notice him is to join the cheerleading squad. Amy comforts RJ and says he should try to please himself instead of others and decides to help RJ with moral support. Robin tries to lead the cheerleaders until Jenny shows up and a confrontation starts to brew until Miles interrupts and the girls are shocked to see him in uniform. When RJ tries to tell Rick the truth that he already was going to be with Suzanne that night, he lies and says he will be with Amy and will eventually be at Rick's later on. Scared about trying to stand up to Sinclair, Miles, Hamilton, Lily and Amy tell RJ to just give him a chance. Afterwards Miles attempts to pull off a cheerleading move with Meredith, who is on her period, and spills blood on Miles as he holds her up, prompting him to run away in extreme disgust. Even though Miles fears the worst humiliation, RJ tries to console him but to no avail. Later on, Robin sabotages Jenny's stunt and ends up hurting her ankle. Miles carries Jenny off to the nurse's office while Robin kicks them both off of the squad. That night, RJ introduces Amy to Sinclair and Suzanne and they enjoy a nice meal along with many bottles of wine while Rick prepares for RJ to arrive at his motel room. While the night goes on for RJ at Suzanne's apartment, Rick gets perpetually drunk and angry at RJ not showing up and ends up at Suzanne's apartment in his bathtowel. Rick tells off RJ leaving him to wonder if his nightmare will ever end.
21	9	"Hunkeez"	Jeff Melman	Bryan Shukoff & Kevin Chesley	May 16, 2011	0.765
In an effort to gain some independence, RJ begs Rick for some help gaining his driver's license. RJ and Miles are excited at first to drive his Mustang until Rick pulls up to Pinkerton High with the "Dong-Mobile", the vehicle for the male strip club "Hunkeez". Embarrassed at first, RJ, Amy and Miles climb in and Rick teaches RJ to drive and directs him to Hunkeez for their buffet. Meanwhile, Jenny and Lily have recently become close since Jenny's accident during cheerleading practice and Robin has become head cheerleader. Lily holds a slumber party for Jenny and they enjoy their night together. Rick, disappointed that he can not get some quality time with RJ, storms off into the club and leaves the others behind. After some time, RJ, Miles and Amy decide to try to find Rick and enter the club. Disgusted as to their surroundings, they attempt to find Rick until the club owner turns RJ around and throws him onto the stage, thinking he's a stripper. RJ gets into the groove at first until Rick interrupts and says he will dance in RJ's place. Lily and Jenny bond over the fact that they both hate Robin and admit that she's a complete bitch. Rick strips and gains a large sum of cash in the process, although embarrassing RJ and making Miles strangely aroused, Amy seems to be having fun. After the song ends, Rick grabs all of the cash available and pulls of a "strip and ditch". The next day, RJ passes his driver's test and Rick gives him the keys to his Mustang as a congratulations and takes Amy for a spin.
22	10	"Sex. Teen. Candles."	Jeff Melman	Niki Schwartz-Wright	May 23, 2011	0.783
It's RJ's birthday, but he's not too happy about it. For all the years of his life Max has bullied him every birthday he had and this year he put a medicated foot powder bomb in his locker thanks to Miles giving him the combination. Amy promised that RJ was going to get a "birthday surprise" if he manned up when it came to Max bullying him. So RJ decides to have a "Max Bash" where it's his birthday party but Max and his friends are not invited. Everything is set for the party at Rick's hotel and all the guests then start to arrive. Amy plays with her band at the party and RJ is in love more than ever. Meanwhile, Max and his crew decide to "gatecrash" the party by dressing up as nerds so they won't realize it's him. RJ and all the rest of his school friends are enjoying themselves, but Rick decides to say a few words which aren't that appropriate for everyone else in the audience, but then Suzanne comes onto the stage and also says the same content of words (how RJ was born). Soon after the speech, Max and his friends arrive and start trashing everything in the party and throw eggs at everyone. Max then confronts RJ with intentions to kill him but RJ tells Max that he has grown tired for 16 years worth of bullying and makes Max flee to Robin's house. Later, RJ and Amy are sitting on a table and RJ is blowing out his birthday candles. Amy asks if there was a wish and RJ comes back with saying "It's about to come true..." then they enjoy Amy's "birthday surprise".
23	11	"Steamy Surprise"	David Katzenberg	Elizabeth Tippet	May 30, 2011	0.796
A normal day occurs at Pinkerton High until RJ gets a flyer for the "Mr. & Mrs. Pinkerton High" with a contestant couple being RJ and Jenny. RJ wonders why he is not coupled with Amy, and so does she, resulting in her assuming RJ wrote them down and she storms off and says she doesn't want to talk to RJ. Meanwhile, RJ and Miles assume that Sinclair is cheating on Suzanne and attempts to prove it. After rummaging through his desk, they find some incriminating photos of him, a woman and a lizard. When they bring it to Suzanne, she says it is her in the photos and RJ leaves to wash his eyes with soap. The next day, Jenny, Lily, Hamilton and Miles admit that they forged RJ's signature on the application form for the contest and only did it to help him stand up and bring down Max and Robin. He attempts to tell Amy this but she rejects him before the message can get through. He then learns that Sinclair plans to propose to his mother. Shocked, RJ heads to the locker room to sort things out in his head and hears something in the shower. He finds Guillermo, a gay student in the school and Max is walking up behind him. Thinking of the worst, RJ tries to warn him until Max turns Guillermo around and kisses him.
24	12	"The Better Man"	David Katzenberg	Paul Ruehl	May 30, 2011	0.863
After learning of Max's secret in the shower, RJ is unsure what to do. When he arrives at school the next day, Max attempts to beat RJ for continuing to run in the "Mr. & Mrs. Pinkerton High" until RJ whispers to Max that he knows about his secret, and Max lays off. When his close circle of friends (Miles, Lily, Hamilton and Jenny) ask him, he pulls Jenny aside and tells her what he saw. Jenny is shocked but tells RJ that it makes sense because her and Max's relationship never got too far. RJ and Jenny agree to keep it a secret and not to out Max during his speech for the "Pinkerton High" contest. Meanwhile, Lily and Jenny forge a plan to ruin Robin and Max. Jenny bumps into Robin on purpose and she goes off on a rant that has Robin slighting the student body. After she leaves, Jenny pulls out a cell phone, apparently recording the whole conversation. During that time, RJ tries to patch things up with Amy, but she seems too steamed that he's hanging out with Jenny too much to realize that he is in love with her. Later that night, Sinclair proposes to Suzanne but Rick and RJ storm in and Rick reads her the poem he wrote to her when they first had sex. Rick and Suzanne immediately make up and Sinclair storms out, vowing to RJ his comeuppance. The assembly for the speech comes and the contestants give their respective speeches. RJ's turn comes and he proclaims his love for Amy and they make up, with Amy saying she loves him too. Hamilton has Lily's cellphone with the recorded message and wonders where she is. After the speeches, Miles and him head to the AV room and play the message when Max and Robin win the contest. The crowd boos them and throws food at them, leaving RJ and Jenny to win. Lily comes in sobbing and tells RJ that she is pregnant with their baby.

== Reception ==
=== Critical response ===
The Hard Times of RJ Berger was described—by its creators and critics alike—as a cross between the teen-oriented television comedy-drama The Wonder Years (1988–1993) and the comedy film Superbad (2007). Brian Lowry of Variety wrote that beyond the crass concept, the show is otherwise "a fairly standard high school-outcast tale", adding that fortunately for MTV "the show's derivative nature will be lost on a target audience barely in diapers during the initial run of 'Wonder Years'."

Robert Lloyd of the Los Angeles Times wrote that "[a]side from a few novel details, MTV's latest is a by-the-book geek sex comedy for the Apatow Generation. In other words, a likely hit." Barry Garron of The Hollywood Reporter wrote that "even with its abundance of stereotypical characters", The Hard Times of RJ Berger "is endearing and relatable to its target demo[graphic]" and drew parallels between its characters and those of the sitcom The Many Loves of Dobie Gillis. Willa Paskin of New York magazine thought that the show's premise was faulty, noting that “an enormous penis is unlikely to have much effect on your social life in high school.”

=== Ratings ===
The pilot episode of The Hard Times of RJ Berger premiered on MTV after the 2010 MTV Movie Awards on June 6, 2010. The debut generated 2.6 million viewers, making it MTV's most-watched series launch in the 12–34 age demographic since 2008.

Viewership for the series' second season ranged between just 765,000 and 1.37 million viewers with the series finale having 865,000 viewers.

== Media information ==
The first season of The Hard Times of RJ Berger was released on DVD through Amazon.com August 23, 2010.
