= Unprisoned =

2023 television series

- Genre: Comedy drama
- Created by: Tracy McMillan
- Starring: Kerry Washington; Delroy Lindo; Marque Richardson; Faly Rakotohavana; Jee Young Han; Jordyn McIntosh
- Country of origin: United States
- Original language: English
- No. of seasons: 2
- No. of episodes: 16

Production
- Executive producers: Kerry Washington; Pilar Savone; Delroy Lindo; Tracy McMillan; Yvette Lee Bowser; Joy Gorman Wettels; Jen Braeden; Kevin Bray
- Production location: Los Angeles, California, USA
- Production companies: SisterLee Productions; Simpson Street; Anonymous Content; ABC Signature; Onyx Collective

Original release
- Network: Hulu
- Release: March 10, 2023 – July 17, 2024

UnPrisoned is a comedy-drama television series created by Tracy McMillan, starring Kerry Washington and Delroy Lindo. The series is produced by Onyx Collective. It premiered on Hulu on March 10, 2023. UnPrisoned received generally positive reviews from critics. In November 2023, it was renewed for a second season that premiered on July 17, 2024. In September 2024, the series was cancelled after two seasons.

== Cast ==
=== Main ===
- Kerry Washington as Paige Alexander, a marriage and family therapist with a large Instagram following. Despite her vocation, she struggles with her personal relationships. Due to her father's frequent imprisonment, she was in and out of various foster homes. She lived with her father's girlfriend Nadine from ages 8–18. She often imagines herself interacting with her "inner child" during stressful situations. Jordyn McIntosh plays young Paige.
- Delroy Lindo as Edwin Alexander, Paige's father who has been imprisoned for the past 17 years. He wants to reconcile with his daughter and make a life for himself on the outside. He is a good cook, but struggles to find employment due to his status as an ex-felon. He is a huge flirt and quite successful with the ladies.
- Marque Richardson as Mal, Edwin's case worker. He becomes Paige's boyfriend for several episodes until she ends the relationship.
- Faly Rakotohavana as Finneas "Finn" Alexander, Paige's teenage son. He is biracial and his father is not in his life. He's an introverted gamer with an interest in card games. He bonds with his grandfather despite his mother's objections.
- Jee Young Han as Esti Nelson, Paige's foster sister from Pastor and Mrs. Nelson's home. She has a sassy "tell it like it is" personality and is often Paige's sounding board. She had been married and divorced three times.

=== Recurring ===
- Brenda Strong as Nadine, Edwin's on-again off-again girlfriend. She took care of Paige from ages 8–18 after Edwin's incarceration, and is frustrated by the fact that she never called her "mom." Paige claims that she has a Cluster B personality disorder, but while she may come off as a bit cruel and superficial, she seems to genuinely love both Edwin and Paige in her own way.
- Edwin Lee Gibson as Fox, one of Edwin's friends from before his incarceration. He seems to still be involved in some shady business.
- Tim Daly as Bill, Paige's boyfriend at the beginning of the show. He breaks up with Paige when she pushes for a more "official" relationship. (Season 1)

== Episodes ==
=== Series overview ===
Series overview
Season	Episodes	Originally released
1	8	March 10, 2023
2	8	July 17, 2024

=== Season 1 (2023) ===
No. overall	No. in season	Title	Directed by	Written by	Original release date
1	1	"Repetition Compulsion"	Kevin Bray	Tracy McMillan	March 10, 2023
2	2	"How to Be a Main Bitch"	Shiri Appleby	Jen Braeden	March 10, 2023
3	3	"Are You My Mother Wound?"	Shiri Appleby	Yvette Lee Bowser & Lane Lyle	March 10, 2023
4	4	"In Dad We Distrust"	Nastaran Dibai	Lauren Caltagirone	March 10, 2023
5	5	"F**k Normal"	Nastaran Dibai	Miguel Nolla	March 10, 2023
6	6	"Nigrescence"	Numa Perrier	Peter Saji	March 10, 2023
7	7	"Unavailably Available"	Numa Perrier	Jen Braeden & Tracy McMillan	March 10, 2023
8	8	"It's About Who You Want to Be"	Pete Chatmon	Tracy McMillan	March 10, 2023

=== Season 2 (2024) ===
No. overall	No. in season	Title	Directed by	Written by	Original release date
9	1	"Don't Try Harder, Try Different"	Shiri Appleby	Tracy McMillan	July 17, 2024
10	2	"How To Be A Cat"	Shiri Appleby	Lauren Caltagirone	July 17, 2024
11	3	"How To Be Friends"	Kevin Rodney Sullivan	Peter Saji	July 17, 2024
12	4	"Into-Me-You-See"	Kevin Rodney Sullivan	Jen Braeden	July 17, 2024
13	5	"Trigger Happy"	Thembi Banks	Lane Lyle	July 17, 2024
14	6	"The Legend of the Rollerblades"	Thembi Banks	Amy Do Thurlow	July 17, 2024
15	7	"A PTCD Christmas Carole"	Pete Chatmon	Tracy McMillan	July 17, 2024
16	8	"The After-Party"	Pete Chatmon	Jen Braeden & Lauren Caltagirone	July 17, 2024

== Production ==
=== Filming ===
Production on the second season started in February 2024.

== Release ==
UnPrisoned premiered on March 10, 2023, on Hulu in the United States. It was released internationally as an original series on Disney+, under the dedicated streaming hub Star, on Disney+ Hotstar, and on Star+ in Latin America.

== Reception ==
=== Audience viewership ===
According to Onyx Collective, the UnPrisoned premiere was Onyx Collective's most-watched Hulu premiere, and the series was the most-watched Hulu Original scripted series so far in 2023, as of March 2023.

=== Critical response ===
The review aggregator website Rotten Tomatoes reported an 93% approval rating with an average rating of 7.8/10, based on 15 critic reviews. The website's critics consensus reads, "A snappy comedy with weighty themes in tow, UnPrisoned lets Kerry Washington and Delroy Lindo bounce off each other to delightful effect." Metacritic, which uses a weighted average, assigned a score of 75 out of 100 based on 8 critics, indicating "generally favorable reviews".

Daniel D'Addario of Variety praised the performances of Kerry Washington and Delroy Lindo and complimented the dynamic between the characters, calling the show a "family story with genuine heart." Kristen Baldwin of Entertainment Weekly gave the show a grade of B+, writing, "The eight-episode season follows a fairly predictable path, and some of Paige's flights of fancy play more silly than funny. (Her chats with "Little Paige" largely work, though, because McIntosh is such a fierce little comedian.) Quibbles aside, UnPrisoned is the type of show that's still a rarity on TV: An intimate, heartfelt comedy about one family's piece of the Black experience." Angie Han of The Hollywood Reporter applauded the performances of Kerry Washington and Delroy Lindo and described the series as "messy but fascinating." Joel Keller of Decider asserted, "Winning performances by Kerry Washington and Delroy Lindo make UnPrisioned a fun show to follow, despite the heavy intergenerational subject matter that's explored on the show."

=== Accolades ===
Year	Award	Category	Nominee(s)	Result	Ref.
2023	Black Reel Awards for Television	Outstanding Comedy Series	Yvette Lee Bowser	Nominated	
2023	Black Reel Awards for Television	Outstanding Directing in a Comedy Series	Numa Perrier	Nominated	
2023	Black Reel Awards for Television	Outstanding Lead Performance in a Comedy Series	Kerry Washington	Nominated	
2023	Black Reel Awards for Television	Outstanding Lead Performance in a Comedy Series	Delroy Lindo	Nominated	
2024	Astra TV Awards	Best Directing in a Streaming Comedy Series	Numa Perrier	Won	
