= K-Pops! =

2024 film directed by Anderson .Paak

- Theatrical release poster
- Directed by: Anderson .Paak
- Written by: Anderson .Paak; Khaila Amazan
- Produced by: Greg Silverman; Jon Berg; Jaeson Ma; Jonnie "Dumbfoundead" Park; Anderson .Paak
- Starring: Anderson .Paak; Jee Young Han; Jonnie "Dumbfoundead" Park; Soul Rasheed; Yvette Nicole Brown
- Cinematography: Edward J. Pei
- Edited by: Ryan Folsey; Joe Frataccia
- Music by: Emily Bear
- Production companies: Stampede Ventures; EST Studios; Big Dummie; Apeshit Films
- Distributed by: Aura Entertainment
- Release dates: September 7, 2024 (TIFF); February 27, 2026 (United States)
- Running time: 116 minutes
- Country: United States
- Languages: English; Korean

K-Pops! is a 2024 American family comedy film directed and produced by musician Anderson .Paak (in his directorial debut), who also wrote the screenplay with Khaila Amazan. .Paak stars in the film alongside Jee Young Han, Jonnie "Dumbfoundead" Park (who also produced), Soul Rasheed, and Yvette Nicole Brown.

Soon after meeting a son he never knew he had, BJ, a lifelong struggling musician, takes him under his wing to help him win a big musical competition on Wildcard, a Korean TV talent contest.

The film premiered at the 2024 Toronto International Film Festival, and was theatrically released by Aura Entertainment on February 27, 2026.

== Plot ==
Drummer BJ, while working a long-staying gig in the Los Angeles Cash Bar meets Yeji, convincing her to sing with him. Afterwards, they connect, becoming a couple. As music is BJ's priority, Yeji leaves.

12 years later, BJ continues at Cash Bar. After chasing off the last regular, Cash fires him. BJ's mom Brenda and Cash persuade BJ to move to South Korea to join the live backing band for the televised K-pop music contest Wildcard. As Cash's distant aunt Diamond hosts the program, and they need a drummer, she hires him.

In Korea, BJ cuts off his dreads and falls asleep after gorging himself on the room's amenities. Awoken by housekeeping, he rushes across town to Wildcard's studio. Arriving over 20 minutes late, Diamond warns he will lose the job if he is not careful.

BJ meets Tae Young upon wrap up on the first day. He introduces himself as Bobby Johnson or BJ, suggesting Tae come up with a different name. BJ meets the 12 y.o.'s group of friends on the show as BNB.

As the competitor Kang is influential, BJ tries to get his attention. When the band jams with the singer, BJ breaks out into a drum solo. When Kang gets annoyed and leaves, the band tells him he hates being upstaged.

Afterwards, BNB enter the studio, so BJ gets to see and hear their talents. He teaches them scatting, and they have an informal jam. As BJ later walks out with Tae he inadvertently meets Tae's mother, surprising both adults, as she is Yeji.

Taking Yeji aside, BJ confirms his suspicion. Tae had mentioned he had never met his father, but she mislead him, saying his father is British. She insists they talk later, so they exchange numbers. Then Tae invites BJ to dinner.

After eating, while Tae leaves the room, BJ presses Yeji as to why she did not tell him. Against BJ's wishes, she spontaneously reveals he is Tae's dad, not Idris Elba as she had lead Tae to believe.

BJ follows Tae into his room, telling him he is equally surprised, as he also found out today. He offers to be there for him if he needs to talk etc. Calling Brenda with the news, Cash is there again. After getting over the initial shock, Cash suggests BJ mold Tae into a K-pop superstar.

The next day, BJ takes Tae out early to groom him for the K-pop competition. Firstly, he takes him out to be pampered, with a sauna then a massage. BJ and Tae get to know each other as they go.

Later, as they wander, they find an Earth Wind & Fire show at a Hard Rock Cafe. BJ suggests they approach the door confidently. However, they are not let in until a K-pop band shows up and recognizes Tae. Once inside, Tae declares BJ is a big fan and drummer so they let him jam with them, especially as they have not seen any black people for weeks.

Father and son continue to practice, until Tae is in the final eight. BJ, Tae and Yeji spend the afternoon to evening together, hanging out, playing video games, having ice cream. By evening, the boy is exhausted, so his parents talk more about why she never told BJ about his son. Then they briefly jam together.

Tae's team, although all but he have been eliminated, continue to stick around in support. BJ works on their dance moves, which Kang unhappily observes as BJ is making Tae better. As Tae continues to rise, Kang insists to Diamond that BJ go or he will quit, so she agrees. The contestants continue to get eliminated, until only Tae and Kang are left for the win.

Diamond lures BJ away with an opening act spot for a former K-pop winner in Saudi Arabia. Initially arriving at the desolate spot, he seems happy. However, a dream convinces BJ to return to Korea to support Tae.

Upon his return, BJ makes up with Tae and Yeji and choreographs BNB's final performance. Brenda and Cash show up to watch and meet Tae. In the end, he comes in second place, but at least they are a united family.

== Cast ==
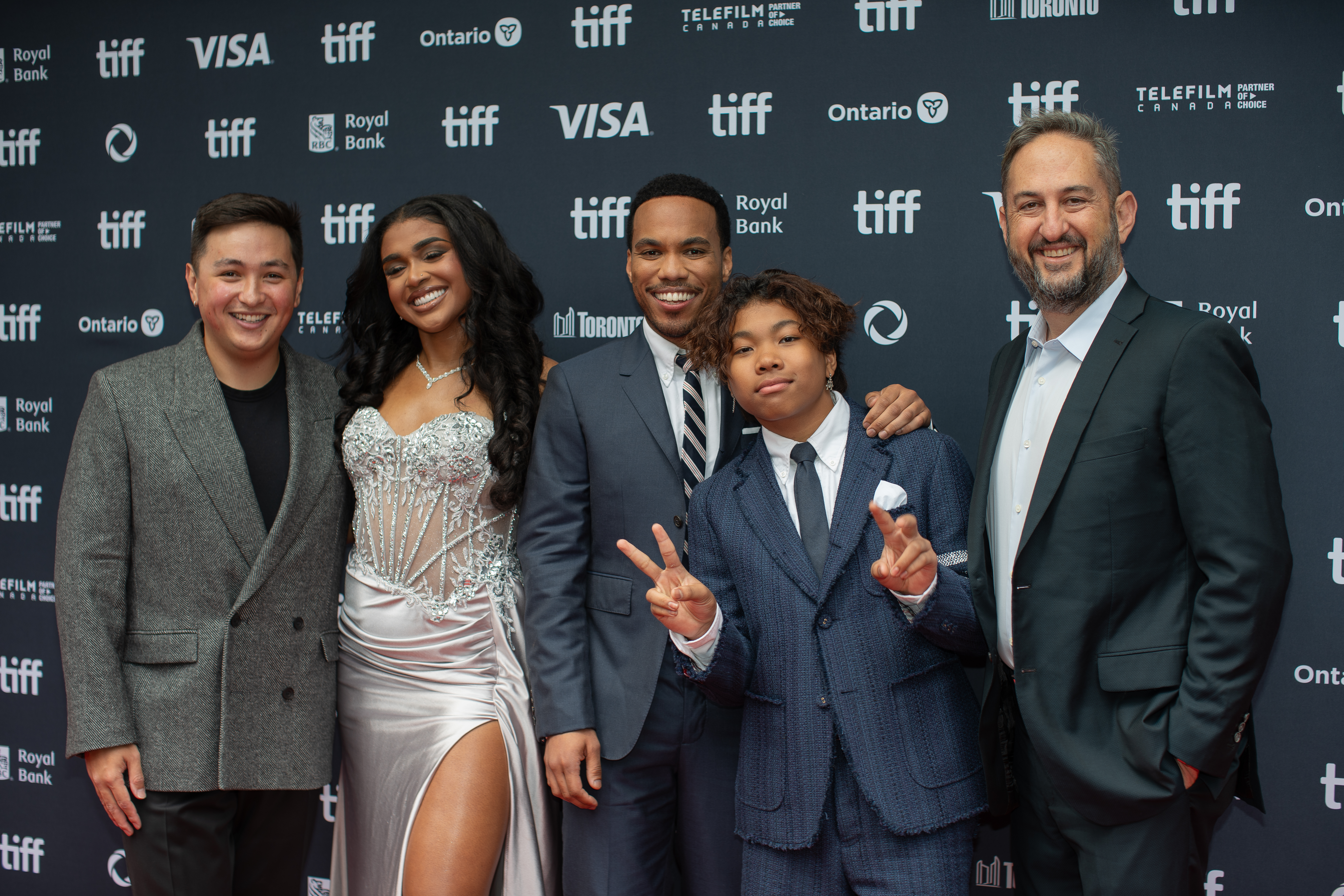
The cast and crew of K-Pops! at the 2024 Toronto International Film Festival

- Anderson .Paak as BJ
- Jee Young Han as Yeji
- Jonnie "Dumbfoundead" Park as Cash
- Soul Rasheed as Tae Young
- Yvette Nicole Brown as Brenda
- Cathy Shim as Diamond
- Kevin Woo as Kang
- Will Jay as Sunghoon
- Emi Kim as Eujin
- Eddie Park as Michi
- Riley Lai Nelet as Dakho

=== Cameo appearances ===
- Vernon
- Jaden Smith
- Diplo
- Tokimonsta
- Jay Park
- The Rose
- Kirk Franklin
- Saweetie
- Jason Her
- Earth, Wind & Fire
- Jessi
- IShowSpeed

== Production ==
Drawing from his own life in conceiving the film, .Paak developed K-Pops! with rapper Dumbfoundead and collaborated with Khaila Amazan on the screenplay. The project was first announced in 2022. Filming began in Los Angeles in October 2023 after the production company Stampede Ventures reached an interim agreement with SAG-AFTRA amidst the union's 2023 strike. Additional filming took place in South Korea and Al-Ula; locations in the Saudi Arabian city were scouted by the film department of the Royal Commission for Al-Ula. .Paak and Dem Jointz collaborated on original songs for the film, while Emily Bear composed its musical score.

== Music ==
The soundtrack album of the film, K-Pops! (Music from and inspired by K-Pops! Motion Picture) was released on May 29, 2026. The lead single of the album, "Keychain", featured the girl group Aespa and .Paak. It was released on February 27, 2026. The second single "Aftertaste", a collaboration between .Paak and singer Dean, was released on May 8, 2026.

== Release ==
K-Pops! premiered as a Special Presentation at the 2024 Toronto International Film Festival on September 7, 2024. In June 2025, Aura Entertainment acquired the film's distribution rights. The film was released in the United States on February 27, 2026.

== Reception ==
On review aggregator Rotten Tomatoes, 88% of 41 critics gave the film a positive review, with an average rating of 6.8/10. The website's critics consensus reads, "An effervescent tribute to K-Pop and writer-director Anderson .Paak's own life story, this agreeable dramedy goes down smooth with its dogged focus on good vibes."

Cary Darling of the Houston Chronicle wrote, "Charmingly smart, with off-hand jokes thrown in about Neil Peart, Childish Gambino and...Gordon Parks that only someone of Paak's wide-ranging tastes would make." Brandon Yu of The New York Times wrote that the film "has its momentary charms, mostly when it’s just .Paak and Rasheed riffing off each other, with the buoyant chemistry of a real father and son."
