= Animal (2014 film) =

2014 film by Brett Simmons

- Theatrical poster
- Directed by: Brett Simmons
- Written by: Thommy Hutson; Catherine Trillo
- Produced by: Andrew Gernhard; Zach O'Brien; Colin Theys; Ember Truesdell; Chris Miller; Thommy Hutson
- Starring: Elizabeth Gillies; Keke Palmer; Jeremy Sumpter; Eve Jeffers; Joey Lauren Adams; Amaury Nolasco; Parker Young; Paul Iacono; Thorsten Kaye
- Cinematography: Scott Winig
- Edited by: Brett Simmons
- Music by: Tomandandy
- Production companies: Chiller Films; Flower Films; Synthetic Cinema International
- Distributed by: Chiller Network
- Release date: June 17, 2014
- Running time: 86 minutes
- Country: United States
- Language: English

Animal is a 2014 American horror thriller film directed by Brett Simmons and starring Elizabeth Gillies, Keke Palmer, Jeremy Sumpter, Eve, and Joey Lauren Adams. The film follows a group of friends that find themselves terrorized by a bloodthirsty beast. The film was released in a limited release and through video on demand on June 17, 2014.

== Plot ==
One night, two married couples, Carl and Vicky, and Douglas and Barbara, are being chased through the woods by a mysterious monster. Barbara is killed as Douglas tries to rescue her.

Some time later, five college students, Alissa, her boyfriend Matt, her step-brother Jeff, Jeff's girlfriend Mandy, and their friend Sean arrive in the forest to hike. Jeff insists on looking for the waterfall he and Alissa used to go to as kids. It is dark by the time they start walking back to the car. They discover the remains of Barbara's body and encounter the creature that killed her. As the creature chases them, they rush to a cabin in the distance. The creature catches up and kills Jeff.

The group desperately bangs on the cabin door and screams for help. The door open just in time for them to get in safely. The occupants turned out to be Carl, Vicky, and Douglas, who have boarded up the windows to protect themselves. While Carl and Vicky are hopeful that they will be rescued soon, Douglas is bitterly cynical. The creature almost breaks into the house, but they fend it off. Matt volunteers to run for the car with a walkie-talkie, while Carl and Sean keep watch for the creature. However, his screams are heard on the walkie-talkie. Douglas attempts to board up the entrance, stranding Sean and Carl outside. However, the women help them get in through the back. The group ties Douglas to the stairs, no longer trusting him.

Mandy reveals to Alissa that she is pregnant while Sean confesses to Mandy that he and Jeff were having an affair. The group discovers Matt, barely alive, in the cellar, along with the animal. They get Matt upstairs but Carl is killed. Douglas proposes that the group let the animal eat Matt as a bait so they can escape. The group refuses and decides to trap the animal inside the house and burn it down. However, when they untie Douglas to help, he beats Matt to death, calling the others weak. The animal breaks in and kills Douglas. As it eats his body, the others spread kerosene throughout the house. Alissa lures the animal into the trap. She sets the fire and burns the monster to death.

However, a second creature appears in the cellar and kills Sean and Vicky. Mandy and Alissa flee into the woods. Alissa is eaten but Mandy is able to reach the car. The second animal attacks her and Mandy manages to kill it by running it over with the car. She drives away in tears.

Meanwhile, a third creature sniffs at the second one's corpse then grunts aggressively, suggesting a call to the pack.

== Cast ==
- Elizabeth Gillies as Mandy
- Keke Palmer as Alissa
- Jeremy Sumpter as Matt
- Parker Young as Jeff
- Paul Iacono as Sean
- Amaury Nolasco as Douglas
- Thorsten Kaye as Carl
- Joey Lauren Adams as Vicky
- Eve as Barbara

== Production ==
The film was shot in Manchester, Connecticut. Actress Keke Palmer said she enjoyed making the movie. However, she said filming the outdoor locations in the woods "was not fun. The outdoors s---? Oh, no, no, no, no. The outdoors in the weeds, in the bushes, in the middle of Connecticut? Oh, hell no. I would have loved another destination, but hey."

== Music ==
The film is scored by Tomandandy. Palmer released "Animal" on May 29, 2014, and a music video released on June 2, 2014 on YouTube.

== Reception ==
The film holds a 50% rating on Rotten Tomatoes, based on 8 reviews.

Shock Till You Drop and Bloody Disgusting both panned the film, and Shock Till You Drop stated that the movie was "a waste of a good, old-fashioned creature." We Got This Covered gave Animal a slightly more positive rating and commented that "Animal has enough carnage to appease more forgiving horror fans, but despite a quick pace and brutal kills, it's repetition that truly kills this beast."

== Home media ==
Animal was released on DVD by Shout! Factory on September 1, 2020 and Prime Video,
