= 3 Amigonauts =

- Also known as: The 3 Amigonauts
- Genre: Comedy
- Created by: Kyle Marshall
- Developed by: Laurie Elliott; Terry McGurrin
- Directed by: Mike Geiger; David Brown
- Voices of: Annick Obonsawin; Julie Sype; Doug Hadders; Deven Mack; Cory Doran
- Theme music composer: Kid Koala
- Composers: Patrick Cooke; DJ Vekked
- Country of origin: Canada
- Original language: English
- No. of seasons: 1
- No. of episodes: 26 (52 segments)

Production
- Executive producers: Vince Commisso; Steven Jarosz
- Producer: Alley Crawford
- Animator: Jam Filled Entertainment
- Running time: 22 minutes
- Production companies: 9 Story Media Group; Corus Entertainment

Original release
- Network: YTV
- Release: August 5 – September 28, 2017

3 Amigonauts (aka The 3 Amigonauts and The Three Amigonauts) is a Canadian animated television series created by Kyle Marshall and developed by Laurie Elliott and Terry McGurrin. The series debuted on YTV on August 5, 2017, and aired new episodes through September 28, 2017.

== Premise ==
The show centers on three lovably reckless 13-year-old children named Herby, Kirbie, and Burt who are hailed as heroes after saving Earth from annihilation. The series takes place during Earth's far-flung future.

== Characters ==
=== The Amigonauts ===
- Herby (Annick Obonsawin) – the one with blue hair and a head bigger than his torso. He is the shortest of the three.
- Kirbie (Julie Sype) – the tallest and sole female of the three. She has green hair.
- Burt (Doug Hadders) – the one with a head and torso as one solid mass with brown hair. He is of medium height.

=== Others ===
- Woody (Deven Mack) – the school van who speaks to the Amigonauts through a radio.
- Colonel Cork (Jesse Buck)
- President Skillsworthy (John Stocker)
- Professor Mybad (Evan Taggart)
- Donnie DeWayne (Cory Doran) – the trio's arch nemesis.
- Betty Soo (Stacey DePass)
- The Donnettes (Amy Matysio) – Donnie's fangirls.

== Episodes ==
No.	Title	Written by	Storyboard by	Original release date	Prod. code
1	"Unicranked"	Evany Rosen	Jeremy Bondy	August 5, 2017	117
1	"A Little Bundle of Danger"	Miles G. Smith	Dave Baggley	August 5, 2017	118
2	"For a Few Dumples More"	Craig Brown	Stephen Whitehouse	August 6, 2017	113
2	"Evil Has a Name"	Tim Burns	Andreas Schuster	August 6, 2017	114
3	"Cheese Your Own Adventure"	Craig Brown	Dave Baggley	August 12, 2017	124
3	"Diffusing Your Lunch"	Miles G. Smith	Jeremy Bondy	August 12, 2017	123
4	"Hotdog Day Afternoon"	Terry McGurrin	Kyle Marshall	August 13, 2017	111
4	"School of Rock"	Terry McGurrin	Craig Taillefer	August 13, 2017	112
5	"Amigobraves"	Craig Brown	Andreas Schuster	August 19, 2017	101
5	"Hamburger Helper"	Kyle Marshall; John Mckinnon	Kyle Marshall	August 19, 2017	102
6	"Invasion of the Donnie Snackers"	Miles G. Smith	Gary Scott	August 20, 2017	131
6	"Morphed Than Words"	Evany Rosen	Dave Baggley	August 20, 2017	132
7	"Faredevils"	Craig Brown	Gary Scott	August 26, 2017	135
7	"Friendship Ball"	Evany Rosen	Jeff Barker	August 26, 2017	136
8	"Ultimate Explorers Club"	Hollas Ludlow-Carrol	Stephen Whitehouse	August 27, 2017	137
8	"Grumpy Young Man"	Mark Edwards	Andreas Schuster	August 27, 2017	140
9	"Flying at the Speed of Love"	Ian MacIntyre	Jeremy Bondy	September 5, 2017	119
9	"Feathership of the Wing"	Craig Brown	Helder Mendonca	September 5, 2017	120
10	"Das Toot"	Craig Brown	Stephen Whitehouse	September 6, 2017	133
10	"You Can Talk the Talk, But Can You Talk to Rocks?"	Miles G. Smith	Andreas Schuster	September 6, 2017	134
11	"Oh, Beehive!"	Andrew Harrison	Gary Scott	September 7, 2017	143
11	"Funny Face It"	Miles G. Smith	Jeff Barker	September 7, 2017	144
12	"A Farewell to Arm Wrestling"	John McKinnon	Andreas Schuster	September 8, 2017	121
12	"Catch Her in the Lie"	Mark Edwards	Stephen Edwards	September 8, 2017	122
"A Farewell to Arm Wrestling": Herbie is scammed by arm-wrestling bikers. "Catch Her in the Lie": Kirbie tells a web of lies to prevent having the trio split.
13	"The Fast Food & the Furious"	Laurie Elliot	Jeremy Bondy	September 11, 2017	109
13	"The Amigonettes"	Miles G. Smith	Helder Mendonca	September 11, 2017	110
"The Fast Food and the Furious": After the 3 are banned from their favorite restaurant by Hangry for abusing the free refills policy, they compete with him by selling cheap burgers from a dumpster. "The Amigonettes": After Hangry goes out of business, their dumpster supply runs out.
14	"Boot Camp, Shmoot Camp"	Evany Rosen	Steve Whitehouse	September 12, 2017	115
14	"Two's a Crowd"	Miles G. Smith	Andreas Schuster	September 12, 2017	116
15	"Campfire Follies"	Craig Brown	Gary Scott	September 13, 2017	145
15	"Full Moon Mayhem"	Craig Brown	Dave Baggley	September 13, 2017	146
16	"Peace, Love & Misunderstanding"	Laurie Elliot; Hollis Ludlow-Caroll	Jeff Barker	September 14, 2017	139
16	"Rent Amigos"	Laurie Elliot	Gary Scott	September 14, 2017	140
17	"Sack Attack"	Laurie Elliot	Steve Whitehouse	September 15, 2017	105
17	"Say Ahhh-Choo"	Laurie Elliot	Kyle Marshall	September 15, 2017	106
18	"Faking the Grade"	Miles G. Smith	Jeremy Bondy	September 18, 2017	127
18	"The Colony"	John McKinnon	Helder Mendonca	September 18, 2017	128
19	"May the 4th Amigonaut Be with You"	Terry McGurrin	Stephen Whitehouse	September 19, 2017	141
19	"Top Cop Flop"	Miles G. Smith	Andreas Schuster	September 19, 2017	142
20	"Parental Misguidance"	Richard Clark	Stephen Whitehouse	September 20, 2017	129
20	"VIP Mistreatment"	Mark Edwards	Andreas Schuster	September 20, 2017	130
21	"Beach Bummer"	Craig Brown	Andreas Schuster	September 21, 2017	149
21	"Leading to Trouble"	Terry McGurrin	Stephen Whitehouse	September 21, 2017	150
22	"Amigo TV"	Andrew Harrison	Stephen Whitehouse	September 22, 2017	147
22	"Spin the Bottle"	Terry McGurrin	Andreas Schuster	September 22, 2017	148
23	"Lanes of Glory"	Ian MacIntyre	Craig Tallifer	September 25, 2017	103
23	"Why So Uptitan?"	Miles G. Smith	Stephen Whitehouse	September 25, 2017	104
24	"Demolition Kirbie"	Andrew Harrison	Steve Whitehouse	September 26, 2017	107
24	"Flowers for Dumples"	Tim Burns	Andreas Schuster	September 26, 2017	108
25	"Glasses Half Fail"	Ian MacIntyre	Stephen Whitehouse	September 27, 2017	125
25	"Burt's Biggest Boom"	Mark Edwards	Andreas Schuster	September 27, 2017	126
26	"Cram, Scam or Scram"	Laurie Elliot	Gary Scott	September 28, 2017	151
26	"Crash Course"	Laurie Elliot	Dave Baggley	September 28, 2017	152

== International broadcast ==
Country	Date	Channel	Title
Italy	February 5, 2018	Pop	I 3 Amigonauti
Portugal	April 25, 2018	RTP2	3 AmigoNautas
