= Rhymes with Banana =

- Directed by: Peter Hutchings; Joseph Muszynski
- Written by: Christina Mengert; Joseph Muszynski
- Produced by: Jonathan Burkhart; Brice Dal Farra; Claude Dal Farra; Lauren Munsch
- Starring: Zosia Mamet; Jee Young Han; Paul Iacono
- Cinematography: Frederick Fasano
- Edited by: Jeremy Newmark; Peter Saguto
- Music by: Spencer David Hutchings
- Release date: October 13, 2012 (Woodstock)
- Running time: 99 minutes
- Country: United States
- Language: English

Rhymes with Banana is a 2012 American comedy film directed by Peter Hutchings and Joseph Muszynski and starring Zosia Mamet, Jee Young Han and Paul Iacono.

== Cast ==
- Zosia Mamet as Z
- Jee Young Han as G
- Paul Iacono as Ted
- Jaleel White as J
- Justine Cotsonas as Veronika
- Deborah Rush as Jane
