= Jareb Dauplaise =

American actor

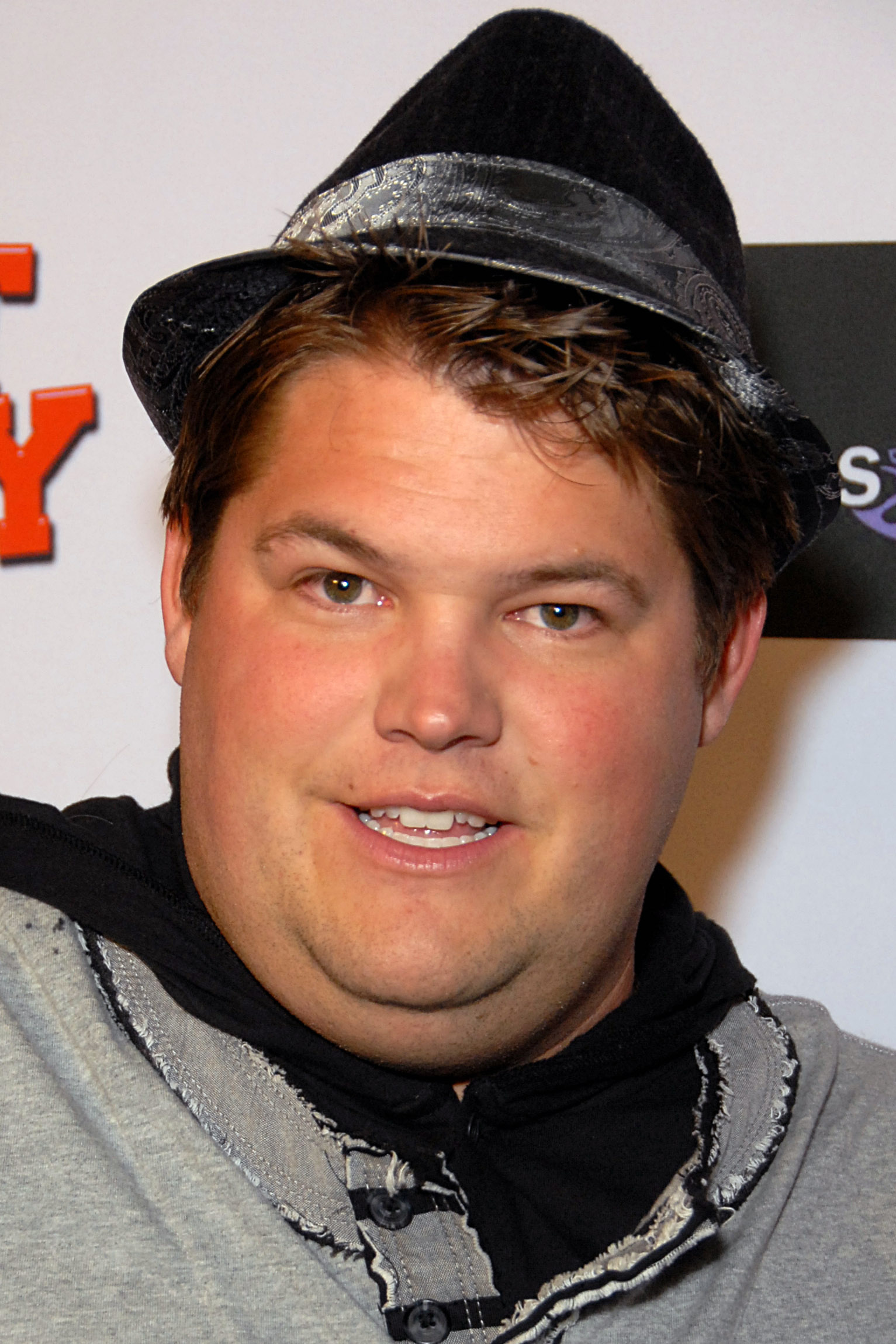
- Dauplaise attending the premiere of "Frat Party" in Hollywood on December 3, 2009
- Occupation: Actor
- Years active: 2002–present

Jareb Dauplaise is an American actor. He played Wayne in The Suite Life of Zack & Cody. He has also appeared in a commercial for the restaurant El Pollo Loco. Dauplaise stars in the film The Prankster, playing Blotto.

Dauplaise stars in a web series called Blue Movies and he had a role in the MTV original series The Hard Times of RJ Berger, as the main character's best friend, Miles Jenner.

== Filmography ==
Film
Year	Title	Role	Notes
2002	Night Terror	Adam	
2003	Double Deuce	Grainger	Direct-to-video
2007	Epic Movie	Nacho Libre	
2007	Dark Mirror	Frat Boy	
2008	Meet the Spartans	Dilio	
2008	Daydreams	Big Mike	Short
2008	Drillbit Taylor	Jareb	
2008	The Price	Takeem Patel	
2009	My Life in Ruins	Gator	
2009	My Name is Matt	Joel	Short
2009	Transformers: Revenge of the Fallen	Frat Guy #2	
2009	Frat Party	Mac	
2010	The Prankster	Blotto Wojonowski	
2010	Cougar Hunting	Tom	
2011	My Trip to the Dark Side	Guy on TV Show	Direct-to-video
2013	Miss Dial	Lawnmower Caller	
2015	Handjob Cabin	Fratty Dan	Short
2016	Water Safety	Jareb	Short
Television
Year	Title	Role	Notes
2003	The New Detectives	Himself	Episode: "Medical Examiner Casebook"
2006	Jake in Progress	Frat Guy	Episode: "Eyebrow Girl vs. Smirkface"
2006	Entourage	Kessler	Episode: "One Day In The Valley"
2007	The Suite Life of Zack & Cody	Wayne Wormser	4 episodes
2007	Monk	Pez	Episode: "Mr. Monk And The Buried Treasure"
2007	Lipshitz Saves the World	Boy #1 Co-Star	Television movie
2008	ER	Chris Hawkins	Episode: "Tandem Repeats"
2009	Zeke & Luther	The Goose	Episode: "Crash Test Dummies"
2009	Blimp Prom	Trent	Television movie
2010	Breaking In	Eddie Gold	Episode: "Pilot"
2010	Silent Library	Himself	
2010–2011	The Hard Times of RJ Berger	Miles Jenner	24 episodes
2013	Rizzoli & Isles	Stuart Strawbridge	Episode: "But I Am A Good Girl"
2013	Mad Men	Richard Duffy	Episode: "To Have And To Hold"
2015	It's Always Sunny in Philadelphia	Tom	Episode: "The Gang Group Dates"
2016	The Big Bang Theory	Jeff	Episode: "The Fetal Kick Catalyst"
2017	Medicinally Approved	Bruce	Television movie
2020	High Mystery	Oscar the Turtle	Pilot
Web series
Year	Title	Role	Notes
2009	Blue Movies	Max Chapman	Short
2010	Laugh Track Mash-ups	Jordan	Episode: "Late for Class!"
2011	Games for Gamers	Jareb	
2016	Millenials: The Musical	Stefan	3 episodes
2016–2017	Seven Bucks Digital Studios	Ben Affleck (voice)	2 episodes
2017	Web TV Cribs	Himself	
2019	Record Breakers	Himself	
