= The Prankster (film) =

2010 American teen-comedy film

The Prankster is a 2010 American teen-comedy film directed by Tony Vidal and featuring Matt Angel, Danny Max, Kunal Sharma, Preston Davis, Madison Riley, and Veronica Sixtos in lead roles, and Georges Corraface, Robert Adamson, Devon Werkheiser, Kurt Fuller, Jareb Dauplaise, and Ally Maki in supporting roles. The film was produced, directed and written by Tony Vidal and was his debut as a director. It was filmed at San Rafael High School.

== Plot ==
The Pranksters are a secret society that rights the wrongs of high school. Its leader, Chris, longs for more with graduation looming. Under the guidance of his eccentric Uncle Nick, Chris embarks on a challenging path of self-discovery and romance.

== Cast ==
- Matt Angel as Chris Karas
- Danny Max as Larry Fasco
- Kunal Sharma as Vish Amritraj
- Preston Davis as Nathan 'Owl' Owsley
- Madison Riley as Tiffany Fowler
- Veronica Sixtos as Mariah Rivera
- Georges Corraface as Nick Caras/Uncle Nick
- Devon Werkheiser as Brad Burris
- Kurt Fuller as Dean Pecarino
- Jareb Dauplaise as Blotto Wojonowski
- Ally Maki as Kassandra Yamaguchi
- Robert Adamson as Eric Hood
