= Meet Monica Velour =

2010 film by Keith Bearden

- Directed by: Keith Bearden
- Written by: Keith Bearden
- Produced by: Jordan Horowitz
- Starring: Kim Cattrall; Dustin Ingram
- Cinematography: Masanobu Takayanagi
- Edited by: Naomi Geraghty
- Music by: Andrew Hollander
- Distributed by: Anchor Bay Films
- Release date: April 2010 (Tribeca)
- Running time: 98 minutes
- Country: United States
- Language: English

Meet Monica Velour is a 2010 American independent comedy-drama film written and directed by Keith Bearden.

The film premiered at the 2010 Tribeca Film Festival.

== Plot summary ==
A young man meets his dream woman (and isn't the least rather troubled that she's a washed-up porn actress 30 years his senior) in this independent coming-of-age comedy. Tobe Hulbert (Dustin Ingram) is a 17-year-old high school graduate who is the working definition of a loser—he's nerdy and socially inept, he lives with his eccentric grandfather (Brian Dennehy), his closest friend, Kenny (Daniel Yelsky), is only 12 years old, and he drives a beat-up hot-dog wagon with a giant frankfurter bolted to the roof. Among his other obsessions, Tobe is fascinated with adult movies of the 1970s and 1980s, and his favorite actress is Monica Velour (Kim Cattrall), who in her heyday was the hottest star in porn. When Tobe discovers there's a collector living in Indiana (Keith David) who is willing to buy his wagon for a good price and Monica Velour will be appearing at a gentleman's club nearby, he decides fate is smiling on him and hits the road. However, the "gentleman's club" turns out to be a sleazy dive and time hasn't been kind to Monica; when several patrons begin shouting insults at her, Tobe defends her honor and gets beat up for his trouble. Monica gratefully befriends Tobe and lets him stay at the trailer park she calls home; he begins to imagine he might have a chance with the woman of his dreams, but while she sees Tobe as a kindred spirit, she has bigger things to deal with, including a career that's going nowhere, an ugly relationship with her ex-husband, and a contentious battle to win back custody of her daughter.

== Cast ==
- Kim Cattrall as Monica Velour
  - Jamie Tisdale as Young Monica Velour
- Dustin Ingram as Tobe Hulbert
- Brian Dennehy as "Pop-Pop"
- Jee Young Han as Amanda
- Daniel Yelsky as Kenny
- Keith David as Claude
- Sam McMurray as Ronnie
- Tony Cox as Petting Zoo Club Owner
