= Tracy McMillan =

American screenwriter

- Born: September 12, 1964 (age 61); United States
- Occupation: Writer
- Website: tracymcmillan.com

Tracy McMillan (born September 12, 1964) is an American author, television writer and self-proclaimed relationship expert.

== Background ==
McMillan is known for the 2011 viral blog post "Why You're Not Married," which for two years was the most-viewed article on HuffPost. She also wrote a book based on it, Why You're Not Married... Yet (Ballantine, 2012). Her screenwriting credits include Mad Men, Necessary Roughness, Chase, Life on Mars, and The United States of Tara. She won the 2010 Writers Guild of America Awards for Dramatic Series for Mad Men, along with other writers of the series.

As a relationship expert, she's made numerous television and radio appearances, including as a matchmaker on the NBC dating reality show Ready for Love, as well as The Today Show, Katie, Bethenny, Dr. Drew's Lifechangers, and Oprah's Super Soul Sunday.

She is biracial and the daughter of an African-American father and European-American mother.

McMillan is the author of a memoir I Love You and I'm Leaving You Anyway (It! Books, 2010) and her debut novel, You'll Know It When You See It, published by Gallery in 2015. She lives in Los Angeles, and continues to write occasionally for the Huffington Post.

== Works ==
- A, B, C... Manhattan (1997)
- Journeyman (2007)
- Life on Mars (2008-2009)
- The United States of Tara (2010)
- Mad Men (2010, Christmas Comes But Once a Year)
- Chase (2010)
- Necessary Roughness (2011)
- Satisfaction (2014-2015)
- Good Girls Revolt (2016)
- Runaways (2018-2019)
- Pride & Prejudice: Atlanta (2019, TV movie)
- Family or Fiancé (2019, reality show host)
- Unprisoned (2023-2024, also creator)

== Bibliography ==
- McMillan, Tracy. I Love You and I'm Leaving You Anyway: A Memoir, It Books, 2011. ISBN 978-0061724596
- McMillan, Tracy. Why You're Not Married . . . Yet: The Straight Talk You Need to Get the Relationship You Deserve, Ballantine Books, 2012. ISBN 978-0345532923
