= Jee Young Han =

American actress

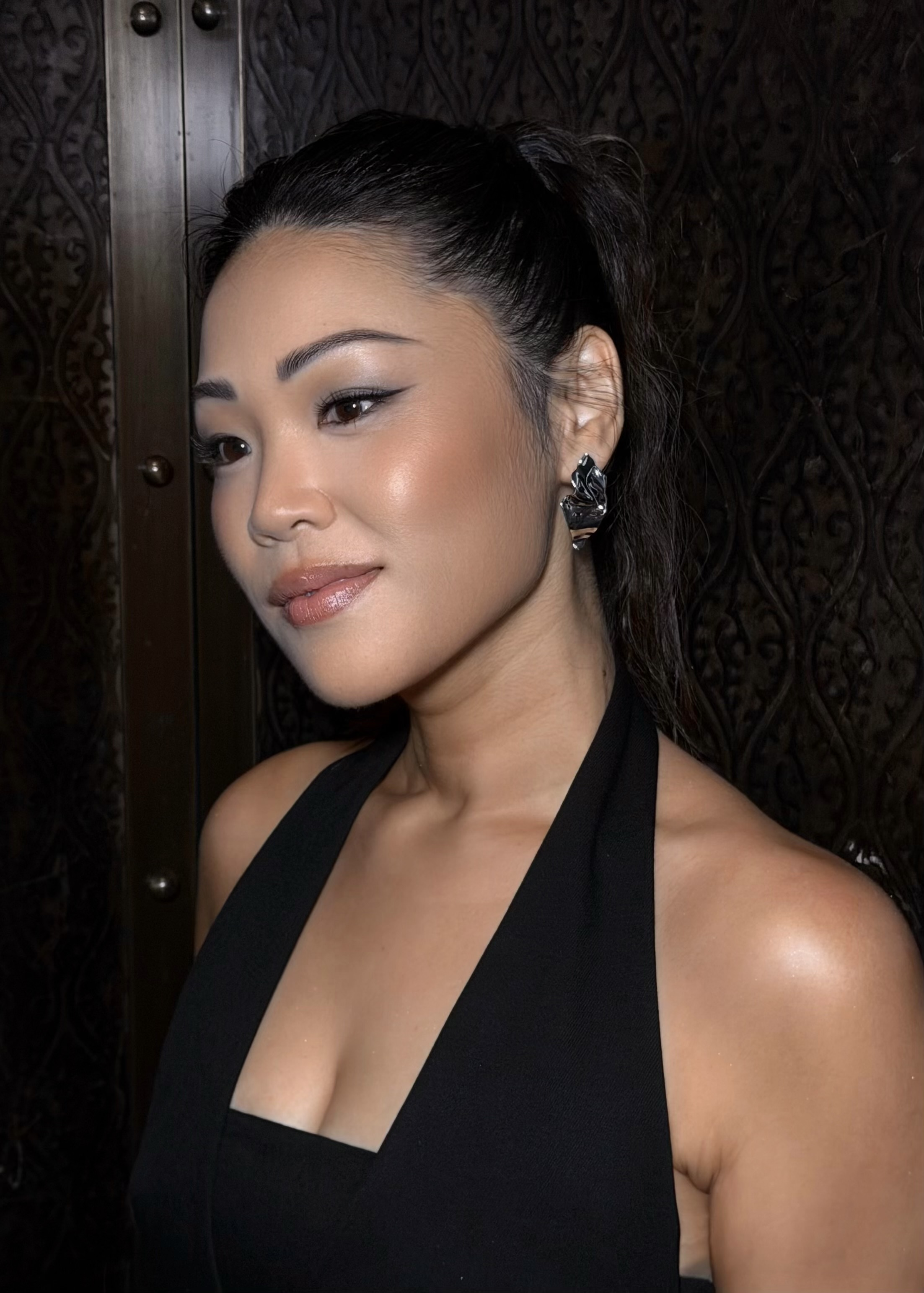
- Han at the 2026 Tribeca Film Festival
- Occupation: Actress
- Years active: 2009–present

Jee Young Han is an American actress. She is best known for her role as Marion Kang on Perry Mason, Min Ju Pak in Wylde Pak, and Esti Nelson on the Hulu/Onyx Collective series Unprisoned.

== Career ==
=== Film ===
Han's career in film began starring in a small role in City Island opposite Andy Garcia and Alan Arkin. Soon after, Han landed the lead role of Amanda Pak in Meet Monica Velour opposite Kim Cattrall and Brian Dennehy. Both films premiered at the Tribeca Film Festival. Han starred in numerous films including It's Kind of a Funny Story, Jason Reitman's Young Adult, and Why Him?

In November 2023, Han was announced as the female lead of K-Pops!, the directorial debut of Grammy Award winning musician, Anderson .Paak. K-Pops! premiered as a Special Presentation at the 2024 Toronto International Film Festival on September 7, 2024.

=== Television ===
Han's career in television began after booking a main character in David Gordon Green's Comedy Central pilot Black Jack. She made various guest appearances including roles on 30 Rock and The Good Wife. She joined the recurring cast of Comedy Bang! Bang! as Jee, the PA. In 2016, after playing the role of Nora in the CBS pilot The History of Us, Han landed a talent development deal with CBS. She recurred as zombie hunter Marsha in Santa Clarita Diet opposite Drew Barrymore and Timothy Olyphant. She also recurred as Charlotte Dearborn in ABC's Station 19.

In 2019, Han nabbed the series lead in the NBC pilot Like Magic. Following their decision not to pick up the show to series, Han inked a talent development deal with NBC and Universal.

In 2021, HBO announced that Han would be joining the main cast of the second season of Perry Mason.

Han subsequently joined the Hulu/Onyx Collective series Unprisoned as Esti Nelson in Spring 2022. She was promoted to the main cast beginning season 2.

=== Voice acting ===
Han voiced the role of Song Oak in the DreamWorks / Netflix animated series, Kipo and the Age of Wonderbeasts.

EA revealed Han as the voice of Bellara in Dragon Age: The Veilguard on July 23, 2024.

On March 11, 2025, Nickelodeon announced Han voicing Min Ju Pak in a new 2-D animated series, Wylde Pak.

== Filmography ==
=== Film ===
| Year | Title | Role | Notes |
|---|---|---|---|
| 2009 | City Island | Casting Assistant | 2009 Tribeca Film Festival |
| 2010 | It's Kind of a Funny Story | HS Do-Gooder | |
| 2010 | Meet Monica Velour | Amanda Pak | 2010 Tribeca Film Festival |
| 2011 | Young Adult | Teen Employee | |
| 2012 | Rhymes with Banana | G | 2012 Woodstock Film Festival |
| 2013 | A Case of You | Improv Comedian #2 | 2013 Tribeca Film Festival |
| 2013 | The Last Keepers | Nika | |
| 2013 | Gabriel | Girl with Braces | 2014 Tribeca Film Festival |
| 2016 | Why Him? | Marnie Dingle | |
| 2024 | K-Pops! | Yeji | 2024 Toronto International Film Festival 2025 Tribeca Film Festival |
| 2026 | Via Negativa | Clara | 2026 Tribeca Film Festival |

=== Television ===
| Year | Title | Role | Notes |
|---|---|---|---|
| 2010 | 30 Rock | Annie | Episode: "Reaganing" |
| 2011 | Black Jack | Caroline | Main role; Comedy Central Pilot |
| 2012 | The Good Wife | Julie Doyle | Episode: "Two Girls, One Code" |
| 2014 | Agatha | Chelsea Chen | ABC pilot |
| 2015 | The History of Us | Nora | CBS pilot |
| 2016 | Shameless | Scarlet | Episode: "Be a Good Boy. Come for Grandma" |
| 2016 | Comedy Bang! Bang! | Jee the PA | Recurring role |
| 2016 | What Goes Around Comes Around | Chelsea | CBS pilot |
| 2017 | Grey's Anatomy | Ingrid | Episode: "In the Air Tonight" |
| 2018 | 9-1-1 | Liz | Episode: "Let Go" |
| 2018 | Santa Clarita Diet | Marsha | Recurring role |
| 2018 | Station 19 | Charlotte Dearborn | Recurring role |
| 2018 | Forever | Karly | Episode: "June" |
| 2018 | The Rookie | Nancy Wu | Episode: "The Good, the Bad, and the Ugly" |
| 2018 | The Mission | Annie Tang | ABC pilot |
| 2019 | Like Magic | Holly | NBC pilot |
| 2019–2020 | Bless the Harts | Binh Ly (voice) | Recurring role |
| 2020 | Kipo and the Age of Wonderbeasts | Song Oak (voice) | Main cast |
| 2020 | Superstore | Kira Moon | Recurring role |
| 2021 | Zoey's Extraordinary Playlist | Jenna Kang | Recurring role |
| 2021 | The Good Doctor | Emily Song | Episode: "Crazytown" |
| 2022 | Players | Seo Hyun Kim | Episode: "Organizm" |
| 2023 | Perry Mason | Marion Kang | Main role |
| 2023 | Mickey Mouse Funhouse | Cho Sook / Ae Che's Mom (voice) | Recurring role |
| 2023–2024 | Unprisoned | Esti Nelson | Recurring role (season 1); main role (season 2) |
| 2025 | Doctor Odyssey | Julie | Recurring role |
| 2025 | Wylde Pak | Min Ju Pak (voice) | Main role |

=== Video games ===
| Year | Title | Voice role | Notes |
|---|---|---|---|
| 2019 | Anthem | Sentinel Dax | Electronic Arts / BioWare |
| 2024 | Dragon Age: The Veilguard | Bellara | Electronic Arts / BioWare |
