= Numa Perrier =

Haitian American director

- Born: Haiti
- Occupations: Actress; director; producer; writer
- Years active: 2008–present
- Notable work: Jezebel; The Perfect Find
- Spouse: Gabrey Milner (m. 2020)
- Children: 1

Numa Perrier is a Haitian-American actress, artist, director, writer, and producer. She is a co-founder of Black&Sexy TV and started her production company titled, "House of Numa". Her debut feature film, Jezebel, premiered at SXSW in 2019. Her sophomore film, the Netflix romantic comedy The Perfect Find premiered at the Tribeca Film Festival where it received the Audience Award for Narrative Film.

== Early life ==
Perrier was born in Haiti and was adopted and raised in Washington state in a family of eight children. In Washington, Perrier grew up on a farm in Cathlamet, Wahkiakum County. The town had a population of around 500 people. Although Perrier left Washington at the age of 10, and has lived in many other places since Perrier notes Washington as one of the more memorable places she has lived. She got to know her biological mother when she was 17. Perrier moved to Las Vegas in late adolescence and did online "peep show" work as a cam girl to make money. Her savings allowed her to move to Los Angeles to pursue a career in film and visual art.

== Career ==
Perrier co-founded Black&Sexy TV, a creative collective and streaming service for Black millennial audiences, with former partners Dennis Dortch, Brian Ali Harding, and Jeanine Daniels in 2010. Their first collaboration was a film called A Good Day to Be Black and Sexy, which premiered at Sundance and was picked up by Magnolia Pictures. Beginning in 2011, they used YouTube to post their content. Notable shows include The Couple, The Number, Hello Cupid and RoomieLoverFriends. Numa starred in The Couple alongside Desmond Faison, and HBO picked up the series for development.

In 2017, Perrier directed her first feature film Jezebel, starring Tiffany Tenille. The semi-autobiographical film draws on Perrier's experience as a "cam girl" performer. Perrier also co-stars in the film, which was shot on location in Las Vegas. Jezebel premiered at SXSW in March 2019, and received positive critical reception. The Hollywood Reporter selected Jezebel as one of its "Best of SXSW 2019" picks. The Los Angeles Times referred to Perrier as "a very fine naturalistic actor" and gave further praise to her filmmaking, noting her "striking handling and welcome thoughtfulness of style." Array Releasing acquired the film in 2019 with a limited theatrical run and it debuted on Netflix on January 16, 2020. Perrier was awarded Best Director and Best Feature Film for Jezebel at the 2019 American Black Film Festival. Perrier played a recurring guest star role on Showtime's SMILF prior to its cancellation.

Perrier directed a live magic show, The Legend of Black Herman, as a part of Derek Fodjour's art installation, Magic, Mystery, and Legerdemain, which ran from March 29 to May 7, 2022, at the David Kordansky Gallery in Los Angeles. She has also directed television episodes for programs including OWN's Queen Sugar, Showtime's comedy-drama series Cinema Toast, Hulu's legal drama Reasonable Doubt, and Hulu's comedy series Unprisoned. Perrier also directed the season 3 finale for the ABC sitcom Young Rock. For her work on The Wonder Years reboot on ABC, Perrier was nominated for the Black Reel Award for Outstanding Directing in a Comedy Series.

Perrier's first studio film, The Perfect Find, starring and co-produced by Gabrielle Union premiered at the 2023 Tribeca Film Festival where it received the Audience Award. Based on the book by Tia Williams and adapted by Leigh Davenport, the film follows a woman in her forties starting a new career only to fall for a much younger man who is also her boss's son. The film released worldwide on Netflix on June 23, 2023, and garnered Perrier an NAACP Image Award nomination for Outstanding Directing in a Television Movie or Special.

Also in 2023, she directed two episodes of the Hulu comedy series Unprisoned starring Kerry Washington, for which she received the Astra TV Award for Best Directing in a Streaming Comedy Series as well as an NAACP Image Award nomination for Outstanding Directing in a Comedy Series.

=== Upcoming projects ===
In December 2021, it was announced that she will produce and star in The Erotic, a biopic about poet and author Audre Lorde. In June, 2022, it was announced Perrier would produce and direct The War and Treaty, from a script by Will McCormack and Craig Borten, based on the life of the Nashville husband and wife vocal duo.

== Personal life ==
Perrier married Gabrey Milner, son of Broadway playwright Ron Milner, in October 2020.

== Filmography ==
=== Film ===
==== As actress ====
Year	Title	Role	Notes
2019	Jezebel	Sabrina	
2023	The Perfect Find	Pearl Bailey	
2023	First Time Female Director	Maya	

==== As director ====
Year	Title	Notes
2019	Jezebel	
2023	The Perfect Find	

=== Television ===
==== As actress ====
Year	Title	Role	Notes
2012–2014	The Couple	Chick	
2013	The Choir	Rochelle	
2019	SMILF	Elsie	

==== As director ====
Year	Title	Episode	Notes
2019	Queen Sugar	Episode 4: "Skin Transparent"	
2021–2022	The Wonder Years	Episode 6: "Be Prepared" and Episode 19: "Love & War"	
2022	Reasonable Doubt	Episode 8: "Song Cry"	
2023	Unprisoned	Episode 6: "Nigrescence" and Episode 7: "Unavailably Available"	
2023	Young Rock	Season 3, Episode 13: "False Ceilings"	

== Awards and nominations ==
Year	Association	Category	Project	Result	Ref.
2019	SXSW Film Festival	Audience Award	Jezebel	Nominated	
2019	Nashville Film Festival	New Directors Competition	Jezebel	Nominated	
2019	American Black Film Festival	Best Film	Jezebel	Won	
2019	American Black Film Festival	Best Director	Jezebel	Won	
2019	Indie Memphis Film Festival	Emerging Filmmaker Award	Jezebel	Won	
2022	Black Reel Awards for Television	Outstanding Directing in a Comedy Series	The Wonder Years	Nominated	
2023	Tribeca Film Festival	Audience Award	The Perfect Find	Won	
2024	NAACP Image Awards	Outstanding Directing in a Television Movie or Special	The Perfect Find	Nominated	
2024	NAACP Image Awards	Outstanding Directing in a Comedy Series	Unprisoned	Nominated	
2024	Astra TV Award	Best Directing in a Streaming Comedy Series	Unprisoned	Won	
2024	Black Reel Awards for Television	Outstanding Directing in a Comedy Series	Unprisoned	Pending	
