= For Your Love (TV series) =

American sitcom

- Genre: Sitcom
- Created by: Yvette Lee Bowser
- Starring: Holly Robinson Peete; James Lesure; Tamala Jones; Edafe Blackmon; Dedee Pfeiffer; D. W. Moffett
- Opening theme: "For Your Love"; Performed by Chaka Khan & Michael McDonald
- Composer: Bill Maxwell
- Country of origin: United States
- Original language: English
- No. of seasons: 5
- No. of episodes: 87 (8 unaired)

Production
- Executive producers: Yvette Lee Bowser; Jamie Wooten; Christopher Vane (Season 5)
- Production locations: Warner Bros. Studios, Burbank, California
- Running time: 22 minutes
- Production companies: SisterLee Productions; Warner Bros. Television

Original release
- Network: NBC
- Release: March 17 – May 5, 1998
- Network: The WB
- Release: September 17, 1998 – August 11, 2002

For Your Love is an American sitcom television series that premiered on March 17, 1998, on NBC. The series was created by Living Single creator Yvette Lee Bowser and starred Holly Robinson Peete, James Lesure, Tamala Jones, Edafe Blackmon, Dedee Pfeiffer, and D. W. Moffett. It was canceled by NBC after its eight-episode first season, and was picked up by The WB for four following seasons. The series ran for a total of five seasons, with its final episode airing on August 11, 2002.

== Synopsis ==
For Your Love focused on three couples who try to counsel each other on how to deal with the opposite sex. At the start of the series, Sheri and Dean were the relationship "veterans," having been together for 15 years, married for the last four. Malena (Sheri's best friend) and Mel were newlyweds, moving next door to Sheri and Dean in the pilot. Bobbi and Reggie (Mel's younger brother) were dating, two "commitment-phobes" who were more devoted to each other than either would readily admit.

The theme song (a cover version of the song of the same name originally performed by the Yardbirds) was performed by Chaka Khan and Michael McDonald.

== Cast ==
=== Main ===
- Holly Robinson Peete as Malena Ellis
- James Lesure as Melvin "Mel" Ellis
- Tamala Jones as Barbara Jean "Bobbi" Seawright Ellis
- Edafe Blackmon (Note: Credited as "Edafe Okurume" in Season 4) as Reginald "Reggie" Ellis (Seasons 1–4; guest star, Season 5)
- Dedee Pfeiffer as Sheri DeCarlo-Winston
- D. W. Moffett as Dean Winston

=== Recurring ===
- Natalie Desselle as Eunetta
- Stuart Pankin as Mr. Gerard (1999–2001)
- Constance Marie as Samantha
- MC Lyte as Lana
- David Ramsey as Brian
- Kelly Perine as Paul
- Jessica Kiper as Amber (1999–2002)
- Eugene Byrd as Omar Ellis (2002)

== Episodes ==
=== Series overview ===
Season	Episodes	Originally released		
Season	Episodes	First released	Last released	Network
1	11	March 17, 1998	May 5, 1998	NBC
2	22	September 17, 1998	May 20, 1999	The WB
3	22	September 24, 1999	May 19, 2000	The WB
4	13	October 8, 2000	May 20, 2001	The WB
5	19	January 20, 2002	August 11, 2002	The WB

=== Season 1 (1998) ===
No. overall	No. in season	Title	Directed by	Written by	Original release date	Prod. code	Viewers (millions)
1	1	"Pilot"	Barnet Kellman	Yvette Lee Bowser	March 17, 1998	475125	12.44
In the pilot, newlywed Malena (Holly Robinson Peete) confides to Sheri that she might be pregnant.
2	2	"The Games People Play"	Barnet Kellman	Kari Lizer	March 24, 1998	467001	10.79
Malena finds out that Mel dated supermodel Naomi Campbell
3	3	"The Mother of All Visits"	Barnet Kellman	David Hemingson	March 31, 1998	467004	10.42
The actions of Dean's overbearing mother send him over the edge.
4	4	"The Donor"	Ellen Gittelsohn	Steve Faber & Bob Fisher	April 7, 1998	467006	9.52
Reggie is asked to be a sperm donor; Mel buys in bulk at a discount grocery store.
5	5	"The Gift That Keeps on Giving"	Barnet Kellman	Jamie Wooten	April 14, 1998	467002	10.60
Dean tries to fulfill Sheri's secret birthday fantasy. Meanwhile, Reggie and Bobbi adopt a dog.
6	6	"The Good Doctor"	Barnet Kellman	Roger S. H. Schulman	April 21, 1998	467005	8.50
Malena and Mel attend a seminar given by a renowned couples therapist but Malena doesn't like what she hears.
7	7	"The Vows"	Leonard R. Garner, Jr.	Clayvon C. Harris	April 28, 1998	467008	8.95
Sheri's expecting beautiful words from Dean when they renew their vows, but he's at a loss for them.
8	8	"The Brother's Day"	Ellen Gittelsohn	Story by : Steve Faber & Bob Fisher; Teleplay by : James Freedman & David Hemingson	May 5, 1998	467009	8.18
Mel and Reggie's spat threatens to turn Malena's Mother's Day brunch for their mom into a day of disaster.
9	9	"The Cookie Monster"	Barnet Kellman	James L. Freedman	Unaired	467003	N/A
Reggie insists that he and Bobbi (Tamala Jones) have an open relationship, so Bobbi responds by dating a guy who owns a cookie business.
10	10	"The Drought"	Shelley Jensen	David M. Matthews	Unaired	467007	N/A
Mel and Malena are in a romantic slump; Dean insists that he and Sheri abstain during his softball-league playoffs.
11	11	"The Last One of the Season"	Leonard R. Garner, Jr.	Kimberly Karp & Phil Breman	Unaired	467010	N/A
Sheri (Dedee Pfeiffer) discovers that Dean has a long-scheduled rendezvous with an old flame.

=== Season 2 (1998–99) ===
No. overall	No. in season	Title	Directed by	Written by	Original release date	Prod. code	Viewers (millions)
12	1	"The Art of War"	Ellen Gittelsohn	Steve Faber & Bob Fisher	September 17, 1998	467601	2.95
Malena (Holly Robinson Peete) discovers that Mel plans to move his bachelor-pad furniture into their undecorated den.
13	2	"The Divorce-i-versary"	Ellen Gittelsohn	Yvette Lee Bowser	September 24, 1998	467602	2.91
Bobbi is all set to celebrate the anniversary of her divorce---until she learns that she's still legally married.
14	3	"The Hair Club for Men"	Ellen Gittelsohn	Rod J. Emelle	October 1, 1998	467603	3.91
Mel introduces Dean to his barbershop, where Dean's NFL experience makes him more popular than Mel.
15	4	"The Big Sleep"	John Bowab	David Hemingson	October 8, 1998	467605	3.65
Sheri and Dean cause sleep disorders in each other; Mel gets wild at an office party.
16	5	"The Most Valuable Player"	Barnet Kellman	Jim Pond & Bill Fuller	October 15, 1998	467604	3.58
Dean appears on a football talk show, where he's humiliated by a replay from his gridiron career.
17	6	"The Sister Act"	Barnet Kellman	Jamie Wooten	October 29, 1998	467606	3.99
Bobbi is suspicious when her sister shows no interest in Reggie; Sheri blames Mel for the ill fate of a migratory bird.
18	7	"The Cuckoo's Nest"	Barnet Kellman	Janette Kotichas Burleigh	November 5, 1998	467607	3.63
Malena is given the ""Shining Star"" award by an association of psychiatrists, but Mel is worried that she's so busy she's going to burn out.
19	8	"The Goodwill Games"	Craig Zisk	Phil Breman & Kimberly Karp	November 12, 1998	467608	3.49
Mel invites Malena to the Bears game to score some ""goodwill"" points, throwing Reggie for a loss when she actually agrees to go. Meanwhile, Sheri and Dean have a sexy tradition of their own, but this year they end up freezing in Mel and Malena's hot tub.
20	9	"The House of Cards"	Shelley Jensen	David M. Matthews	November 19, 1998	467609	3.15
Sheri introduces her long-time male friend to whom Dean tolerates because he thinks he's gay.
21	10	"The Runaround"	Ellen Gittelsohn	Steve Faber & Bob Fisher	December 17, 1998	467611	3.80
Malena cheats to beat Sheri in a 10K race; Mel struggles to repair a runny sink.
22	11	"The Nightcap"	Barnet Kellman	Clayvon C. Harris	January 7, 1999	467610	4.05
Reggie and Bobbi disagree over the use of condoms; Mel and the mail carrier don't get along.
23	12	"The Brother from Another Planet"	Ellen Gittelsohn	Bill Fuller & Jim Pond	January 14, 1999	467612	4.45
Mel invites Reggie to stay with him and Malena temporarily because the heat's out at his place.
24	13	"The Golf War"	Jason Bateman	Kimberly Karp & Phil Breman	January 21, 1999	467613	3.94
A golf weekend with Dean is Mel's first time away from Malena; Bobbi tees off on Reggie after her purse is stolen.
25	14	"The Endangered Species"	John Bowab	David Hemingson	February 4, 1999	467614	3.42
Sheri protests when Dean's design for an outlet mall requires the destruction of an old tree
26	15	"The Last Auction Hero"	Ellen Gittelsohn	Rod J. Emelle	February 11, 1999	467616	4.07
At a bachelor auction, a woman who's longed for Reggie since junior high outbids Bobbi for a date with him.
27	16	"The Paper Chase"	Leonard R. Garner, Jr.	David M. Matthews	February 18, 1999	467615	3.5
To celebrate their anniversary, Malena insists that she and Mel go to the same Indiana restaurant where he proposed.
28	17	"The Height of Passion"	Ellen Gittelsohn	Allen Crowe	February 25, 1999	467618	3.69
Sheri demands that acrophobic Dean rewrite a high-school love message on a water tower.
29	18	"The Van for All Seasons"	D. W. Moffett	Teri Schaffer Hicks	April 22, 1999	467617	3.95
Malena figures if she tells Mel that she wants him to buy a new minivan, then he won't...but he does
30	19	"The Mother Load"	Craig Zisk	David Hemingson & David M. Matthews	April 29, 1999	467620	4.20
As Malena readies for a visit from her flashy mother, Mel retreats to Dean's garage to avoid the inevitable stand-off.
31	20	"The First Big Break-Up"	Roger Christiansen	Sean Dwyer	May 6, 1999	467619	3.65
Bobbi's relationship with Reggie is on the ropes after she mistakenly believes he bought a gift for another woman.
32	21	"The Morning After"	Maynard C. Virgil I	Kimberly Karp & Phil Breman	May 13, 1999	467621	4.47
Malena teaches Mel the art of avoiding a pick-up when she finds phone numbers in his pocket after his boys' night out
33	22	"The Baby Boom"	Barnet Kellman	Steve Faber & Bob Fisher	May 20, 1999	467622	3.57
At a neighbor's baby shower, the still estranged Bobbi and Reggie play a game of dating one-upmanship.

=== Season 3 (1999–2000) ===
No. overall	No. in season	Title	Directed by	Written by	Original release date	Prod. code	Viewers (millions)
34	1	"The Thanks You Get"	Shelley Jensen	Jim Pond & Bill Fuller	September 24, 1999	225651	3.34
Reggie learns that Bobbi still wants him when his phone's star-69 feature reveals that she tried to contact him. Meanwhile, Sheri and Dean discover the advantages of being expectant parents when Sheri dons a fake pregnancy tummy; and Malena fumes when she finds out that Mel never mailed the thank-you notes from their wedding.
35	2	"The Best Laid Plans"	Shelley Jensen	Kimberly Karp & Phil Breman	October 1, 1999	225652	4.09
The arrival of Sheri's wayward teen sister, Amber lets Sheri and Dean practice their parenting skills. Meanwhile, things get heated when Reggie tries to talk Bobbi out of moving.
36	3	"The Girl Most Likely to..."	Barnet Kellman	Jamie Wooten	October 8, 1999	225654	2.72
Malena's professional neutrality crumbles as she prepares to top her former high-school rival at their class reunion. Meanwhile, Mel frets over measuring up to Malena's ex-boyfriend, astronaut Charles Pressman; and Bobbi and Reggie agree to house-sit while their friends are out to prevent Mel and Malena from becoming the next victims of a neighborhood burglar.
37	4	"The Ex-Files"	Barnet Kellman	Steve Faber & Bob Fisher	October 15, 1999	225653	3.44
Dean fears his wife and his ex-girlfriend (Lisa Thornhill) will realize he was seeing both of them at the same time during his bachelor days. Meanwhile, Reggie tries to get Bobbi to rescind her celibacy rule by feigning a love for poetry, and Mel and Mr. Gerard declare war against the drivers who speed down their street.
38	5	"The Trouble with Angels"	Joe Regalbuto	Teri Schaffer Hicks	October 22, 1999	225655	2.86
After hearing Malena rave about her sexy gynecologist, an insecure Mel tells the doctor his wife has another GYN. Meanwhile, Bobbi confronts her own insecurity when Reggie starts dating another woman, who has connections in high places.
39	6	"The Leap of Faith"	Joe Regalbuto	David M. Matthews	November 5, 1999	225656	2.39
Dean flips when Sheri decides to take up mountain climbing to sow her oats before becoming a mom, and Reggie regrets hiring Bobbi as a hostess for his club when her diva-like attitude starts riling his customers.
40	7	"The Sins of the Mother...and the Boyfriend"	Henry Chan	Rod J. Emelle	November 12, 1999	225657	3.60
Bobbi's long-lost mother Brenda returns and asks Reggie to help her reconcile with her daughter. Meanwhile, Sheri enters Dean in a contest to appear in an underwear ad and he makes the final round. But when the ad is published, Dean cringes when he sees he's exposed a lot more than he expected.
41	8	"The Membership Drive"	Roger Christiansen	Kyle Boswer	November 19, 1999	225659	3.13
Reggie and Dean smell tokenism when Mel gets into a country club Dean's been trying to join for three years. Meanwhile, Bobbi badgers Reggie into buying her a wide-screen TV, and Sheri and Malena can't face each other after unexpectedly having to bare all together during a ritzy spa mud bath.
42	9	"The Couples Court"	Henry Chan	Maisha Closson	December 3, 1999	225658	2.80
The Ellis marriage hits a rock when Malena's expert testimony for Mel erodes his case. Meanwhile, Bobbi clashes with the principal, Mr. Sato when she wants her students to come in dressed as their heroes---regardless of gender. He declares boys must choose male role models and girls must choose females.
43	10	"The Burden of Truth"	John Bowab	Teri Schaffer Hicks	January 7, 2000	225664	3.08
Malena must choose between her friend or family member when she learns Bobbi has a new beau behind Reggie's back. Meanwhile, Sheri tapes over Dean's prized video of his favorite college football triumph and is forced to call his old friends, including Eric Dickerson, to get another copy before Dean finds out.
44	11	"The Father Fixture"	Lee Shallat Chemel	David M. Matthews	January 14, 2000	225661	2.90
Mel blames Malena for his parents' possible split because his mother (Jenifer Lewis) followed Malena's advice to visit a therapist. Meanwhile, Sheri and Dean go for fertility tests, which have Dean spinning with anxiety over his virility.
45	12	"The Special Delivery"	Lee Shallat Chemel	Kimberly Karp & Phil Breman	January 21, 2000	225660	3.04
Mrs. Gerard breaks up Dean's guys-only weekend when her water breaks and the men must rush her to the hospital. But a blizzard forces them to take the train, where they become trapped during a power outage. Meanwhile, Malena, Bobbi and Sheri's girls-only weekend also disintegrates as they spar over who was invited.
46	13	"The Egg Timer"	Shelley Jensen	Kimberly Karp & Phil Breman	February 4, 2000	225665	2.69
When baby-making efforts put Dean and Sheri's lovemaking on a strict schedule, a frustrated Dean withdraws from his wife, scaring Sheri into doubting the stability of their marriage. Meanwhile, Bobbi and Reggie impulsively decide to live together, leading Mel and Malena to give the couple some questionable advice.
47	14	"The Adulterer Who Came to Dinner"	John Bowab	Steve Faber & Bob Fisher	February 11, 2000	225663	2.73
To make partner, Mel agrees to host a dinner for his boss and his boss's mistress, but he lets Malena think the mistress is the Mrs. Meanwhile, Eunetta persuades Reggie to have a showing of her paintings at the restaurant by promising to paint his portrait. But when the painting is unveiled, he's the one who is exposed.
48	15	"The French Lesson"	D. W. Moffett	Jeffrey B. Hodes & Nastaran Dibai	February 18, 2000	225662	2.91
Mel feels left out and fears his marriage may have met its Waterloo when Malena's French club consumes more of her time. Meanwhile, Dean and Sheri clash over how to handle Amber's wild ways when Dean catches Amber having a beer-soaked party after ditching school.
49	16	"The Date That Time Forgot"	Joe Regalbuto	Rod J. Emelle	February 25, 2000	225666	2.63
Bobbi learns she's living with Malena's leftovers when Sheri spills the beans and reveals that Malena and Reggie once dated.
50	17	"The Accidental Doctor"	D. W. Moffett	Sharon Lee Watson	April 7, 2000	225667	2.53
When he tells off Malena's patient Dexter for calling her at home, Mel unwittingly gets Malena fired and himself hired as Dexter's new therapist. In other storylines, Dean and Sheri unknowingly steal a gift meant for charity when they confiscate a recliner the Gerards left out on the curb; and Bobbi is upset when the groomer gives her dog a bad haircut.
51	18	"The Bread Winner"	Roger Christiansen	David M. Matthews	April 21, 2000	225668	2.68
Reggie feels crowded when he has to share the apartment with Bobbi's best friend, who has always hated him; Sheri fears Dean has lost the will to work after he is laid off and takes his time finding another job.
52	19	"The Pregnant Pause"	Maynard C. Virgil I	Maisha Closson	April 28, 2000	225671	3.71
Malena's stomach flu turns out to be something else entirely; Bobbie and Reggie decide to do a little remodeling, but their relationship may suffer for it.
53	20	"The Prenuptial Disagreement"	Roger Christiansen	Allen Crowe	May 5, 2000	225669	2.32
When Malena's assistant Lana (MC Lyte) decides she wants to get married. But the celebratory spirit deflates when Malena asks Mel to draw up a prenuptial agreement for the flighty Lana and learns he had secretly drawn one up before their marriage. Meanwhile, Reggie fears Bobbi wants a baby.
54	21	"The Shrink Gets Shrunk"	Jason Bateman	Christina Royster	May 12, 2000	225670	2.01
Malena is rattled when a new psychiatrist conducting an annual evaluation has doubts about her performance because she believes Malena has a problem with rigidity. Meanwhile, Reggie becomes obsessed with Dean's motorcycle after Dean and Mel claim he's not very masculine because he's not good with tools.
55	22	"The Talented Mr. Rip-Off"	Shelley Jensen	Kimberly Karp & Phil Breman	May 19, 2000	225672	2.62
When Dean's brother claims he needs one of Dean's kidneys, Sheri smells a scam and tells Dean to refuse. Meanwhile, Malena is jealous when she learns Mel corresponds regularly with an old flame. When Mel refuses to understand her discomfort, Malena turns to Sheri's mom for advice.

=== Season 4 (2000–01) ===
No. overall	No. in season	Title	Directed by	Written by	Original release date	Prod. code	Viewers (millions)
56	1	"The Things We Do for Love"	Barnet Kellman	Kimberly Karp & Phil Breman	October 8, 2000	226651	3.20
Mel is offered a partnership which he's hesitant to accept when his boss (Richard Gant) wants him to sign a 10-year contract that would forestall Mel's plans to ultimately start his own firm. Meanwhile, Sheri and Dean are inspired to make an erotic film of themselves, and Bobbi takes Reggie mattress-shopping to banish the memory of his ex-girlfriends.
57	2	"The Out-of-Towners"	Barnet Kellman	Christopher Vane	October 15, 2000	226652	2.75
Malena is miffed when Mel goes partying with an old college friend, Brian (David Ramsey), whose wife lets him go to strip clubs. So Malena decides to teach Mel that two can play at that game. Meanwhile, Reggie learns Bobbi is still paying rent on her apartment even though she's living with him.
58	3	"The Truth About Cats and Dogs"	Ellen Gittelsohn	Jamie Wooten	October 22, 2000	226653	3.20
When Bobbi rules her out as a Career Day speaker, Sheri decides she needs to do something with her life and starts college. Meanwhile, Malena's pride is wounded when the neighbors' son is scared of her. And Bobbi runs into trouble at school when the kids learn she and Reggie are living together.
59	4	"The Craving"	Ellen Gittelsohn	Maisha Closson	October 29, 2000	226654	3.06
Reggie is in a quandary when his ex-girlfriend (Daphnee Duplaix) turns up to tell him she wants him back and part of him wants to accept the offer. Unfortunately, he doesn't realize Bobbi knows the woman is in town. Meanwhile, Malena is annoyed when Mel has symptoms of sympathetic pregnancy
60	5	"The Rules of Engagement"	Shelley Jensen	Jennifer Glickman	March 11, 2001	226655	3.06
Reggie tells Dean and Mel that he plans to propose to Bobbi after seeing her in an unflattering way that didn't repulse him. Meanwhile, Dean repaints the kitchen in a shade of pink and Sheri doesn't have the heart to tell him she hates it.
61	6	"The Not-So-Hostile Takeover"	Shelley Jensen	David M. Matthews	March 18, 2001	226656	2.64
Malena feels left out after Sheri spends her free time with another friend, which leads to an embarrassing public outburst. Meanwhile, Mel abuses Dean's generosity at work.
62	7	"The Wedding"	Joe Regalbuto	Rod J. Emelle	April 8, 2001	226657	2.57
Reggie and Bobbi squabble over their wedding plans, which leads to a heated argument that jeopardizes the ceremony. Meanwhile, Dean unwittingly annoys Sheri by not paying close enough attention to her.
63	8	"The Second Big Breakup"	Joe Regalbuto	Sean Dwyer	April 15, 2001	226658	2.28
Bachelor and bachelorette parties are planned for Reggie and Bobbi, and everyone agrees not to hire any strippers. But both celebrations feature scantily clad dancers, one of whom suffers an injury.
64	9	"The Model Client"	Ellen Gittelsohn	Carla Banks Waddles	April 22, 2001	226659	2.09
Mel sets out to land the NBA's Shaquille O'Neal (who appears as himself) as a client, but winds up signing a supermodel instead. However, the beautiful woman's demands may be more than the attorney realizes. Meanwhile, Bobbi pesters Sheri about her relationship with Dean.
65	10	"The Replacements"	Jason Bateman	David Babcock	April 29, 2001	226661	2.28
Mel promises Malena that he'll join her at a birthing class, but an important business meeting beforehand runs long and he may miss the session. Meanwhile, Sheri spends much of her free time with Bobbi, who finds their outings less than exciting.
66	11	"The Next Best Thing"	D. W. Moffett	Jennifer Glickman	May 6, 2001	226662	2.63
Sheri wants Malena to hire her as a nanny, but the mother-to-be would prefer to employ a professional caretaker instead. However, she does allow Sheri to sit in during the interviews, until her friend chases away a qualified candidate. Meanwhile, Mel employs Bobbi as a silent counselor when he takes on a large law firm during a divorce proceeding, and Dean pays Reggie to prepare meals for him.
67	12	"The Forbidden Dance"	Otis Sallid	Christopher Vane	May 13, 2001	226663	2.69
Sheri is invited to a night of salsa dancing with her friends, but she doesn't know that their husbands have asked Dean to join them. Meanwhile, Reggie throws out his back during his honeymoon trip to Hawaii.
68	13	"The Birth Day"	Shelley Jensen	Jamie Wooten	May 20, 2001	226664	3.06
The fourth season concludes as Dean takes Malena and Mel to the hospital when the mother-to-be goes into labor. Once there, Malena tells her husband to keep his video camera rolling, no matter what happens. Meanwhile, Sheri arrives at the hospital and aggravates Dean.

=== Season 5 (2002) ===
No. overall	No. in season	Title	Directed by	Written by	Original release date	Prod. code	Viewers (millions)
69	1	"The "What Have I Done?" Show"	Shelley Jensen	Nicholas Hope & Jessie Jones	January 20, 2002	226665	2.4
Malena and Mel bring their newborn baby home from the hospital and struggle to calm the constantly crying infant. Meanwhile, Dean thinks his wife is coming back to him, but Sheri has other ideas.
70	2	"The Great Escape"	Barnet Kellman	David M. Matthews	January 27, 2002	226666	2.4
Reggie decides to move to the Caribbean Islands to run a restaurant without discussing it with Bobbi first. Meanwhile, Malena is reluctant to let an injured Mel look after the baby, despite Malena's obvious need for some free time away from the house.
71	3	"The Friend in Need"	Ellen Gittelsohn	Kyle Bowser	February 10, 2002	226667	2.1
Sheri volunteers to help Malena lose the weight she gained during her pregnancy, but Sheri's efforts are hindered by Malena's attitude. Meanwhile, Dean accepts a dinner invitation from a female co-worker.
72	4	"The Boy from Uncle"	D. W. Moffett	Phil Breman	February 17, 2002	226668	1.5
Mel's uncle is hired to run the restaurant, but the new boss clashes with Bobbi, who filled in as manager after Reggie left. Meanwhile, Dean finds a dog in a supermarket parking lot and he's reluctant to give the pooch back to its rightful owner.
73	5	"The Reunion"	Maynard C. Virgil	Maisha Closson	February 24, 2002	226669	2.21
Malena tries to juggle her responsibilities as a mother and her job as a therapist, but her struggles may cost her a longtime client. Meanwhile, Dean wonders what he should get Sheri for her birthday.
74	6	"The Picture Perfect Family"	D. W. Moffett	Unknown	March 3, 2002	226670	2.75
Mel and Malena's baby is chosen to appear in a calendar, but the two argue over allowing the infant to be photographed. Meanwhile, Omar throws a party in Bobbi's apartment, which leads to her eviction.
75	7	"The Sexual Evolution"	Roger Christiansen	Allen Crowe	March 10, 2002	226671	1.8
Malena and Mel want some privacy, so they kick Bobbi and Omar out of the house. But their intimate time together is disappointing for both of them. Meanwhile, Sheri brings home a rabbit that wreaks havoc on Dean's allergies.
76	8	"The Green-Eyed Monster"	Maynard C. Virgil	Carla Banks Waddles	March 17, 2002	226672	2.65
Mel is jealous of the attention that Malena is giving their son; Sheri is concerned about Dean's attractive co-worker; Bobbi receives divorce papers from Reggie and misinterprets advice from Omar.
77	9	"The Affairs of the Heart"	Ellen Gittelsohn	David M. Matthews	March 31, 2002	226675	1.68
Malena worries that she and Mel are starting to take each other for granted, so she decides to spice things up during a night out at a club. Meanwhile, Sheri is shocked when her mother displays a very carefree attitude regarding her latest divorce.
78	10	"The Helpless Hand"	D. W. Moffett	Sean Dwyer	March 31, 2002	226674	1.98
Mel hires a new assistant hoping to prove Malena wrong when his wife says that he is terrible at picking personnel. Meanwhile, Sheri worries that Dean might not need her anymore when he begins performing most of the household tasks
79	11	"The Blast from the Past"	Ellen Gittelsohn	Jennifer Glickman	July 28, 2002	226673	1.59
The Ellises hire Mel's childhood babysitter to help care for Evan, but the bossy woman treats Mel like a child and undermines Malena's maternal authority. Meanwhile, Sheri learns that a Web site dedicated to Dean's NFL career is really meant to mock the former player.
80	12	"The Enemy Next Door"	Victor Gonzalez	Kimberly Karp & Phil Breman	August 4, 2002	226676	1.62
A silly quarrel between Malena and Sheri escalates when Mel and Dean exchange insults while trying to get their wives to reconcile. Meanwhile, Bobbie reluctantly dates a bartender with a self-esteem problem.
81	13	"The Odd Couples"	Roger Christiansen	Bill Fuller & Jim Pond	August 11, 2002	226677	1.43
Dean tries to set his boss up with Mel's assistant in hopes of landing an important architectural assignment, but his own enthusiasm jeopardizes the plan. Meanwhile, Bobbi joins a dating service, yet her first partner is not the type of man she expected.
82	14	"The Reel Deal"	Roger Christiansen	Chuck Tatham	August 11, 2002	226678	1.49
Bobbi asks Omar to pretend to be her boyfriend so they can try out for a TV reality series that chronicles the exploits of four couples. Meanwhile, Dean, Sheri, Mel and Malena also audition for the show.
83	15	"The Lifelong Dream"	Maynard C. Virgil	Allen Crowe	Unaired	226679	N/A
Dean promises to take Sheri on a dream vacation, but he picks a destination that leaves her cold. Meanwhile, Mel and Malena argue over having a second child.
84	16	"The Professionals"	D. W. Moffett	David Babcock	Unaired	226680	N/A
Mel and Malena argue over who should stay home and watch Evan on a night when they both have professional obligations and their overworked baby-sitter is unable to keep an eye on the child. Meanwhile, Sheri announces that she is pregnant and Dean tries to prepare for fatherhood
85	17	"The Missing Link"	Victor Gonzalez	Carla Banks Waddles	Unaired	226681	N/A
Dean uses the Internet to locate Sheri's estranged father and invites the man to their home; Bobbi's prudish cousin visits and winds up in a comprising position with Omar.
86	18	"The Blaze of Glory"	D. W. Moffett	Christopher Vane & Jamie Wooten	Unaired	226682	N/A
The Winstons' garage burns down during this installment, which includes clips from previous episodes.
87	19	"The Married Little Christmas"	Ellen Gittelsohn	Kimberly Karp & Phil Breman	Unaired	226660	N/A
Malena and Mel plan a trip to New York at Christmastime, but they cannot find an available hotel room anywhere in the City. Meanwhile, Sheri asks Dean to pretend that their marriage is still intact for the sake of her visiting mother Ronnie. Dean attempts to do so but finally admits the truth, to Ronnie's disappointment. And Bobbi and Reggie buy a live Christmas tree, even though it violates the policy of their building's management.

== Awards and nominations ==
Year	Award	Category	Recipient	Result
1999	NAACP Image Award	Outstanding Lead Actress in a Comedy Series	Holly Robinson Peete	Nominated
2000	NAACP Image Award	Outstanding Comedy Series	For Your Love	Nominated
2000	NAACP Image Award	Outstanding Actress in a Comedy Series	Holly Robinson Peete	Nominated
2001	NAACP Image Award	Outstanding Comedy Series	For Your Love	Nominated
2001	NAACP Image Award	Outstanding Actress in a Comedy Series	Holly Robinson Peete	Nominated
2002	NAACP Image Award	Outstanding Actress in a Comedy Series	Holly Robinson Peete	Nominated
