= Run the World (TV series) =

2021 American television series

- Promotional poster
- Genre: Comedy drama
- Created by: Leigh Davenport
- Starring: Amber Stevens West; Andrea Bordeaux; Bresha Webb; Corbin Reid; Tosin Morohunfola; Stephen Bishop
- Country of origin: United States
- Original language: English
- No. of seasons: 2
- No. of episodes: 16

Production
- Executive producers: Leigh Davenport; Yvette Lee Bowser
- Running time: 26–30 minutes
- Production companies: SisterLee Productions; Lionsgate Television

Original release
- Network: Starz
- Release: May 16, 2021 – July 14, 2023

Run the World is an American comedy drama television series created by Leigh Davenport, who is co-executive producer with Yvette Lee Bowser. Set in Harlem, it centers on a group of friends (portrayed by Amber Stevens West, Andrea Bordeaux, Bresha Webb, and Corbin Reid) navigating relationships and the professional world. Run the World is produced by Bowser's SisterLee Productions and Lionsgate Television.

The eight-episode half-hour series premiered on Starz on May 16, 2021. It received positive reviews and holds a 100% rating on review aggregator Rotten Tomatoes. In August 2021, the series was renewed for a second season, which premiered on May 26, 2023. In September 2023, the series was canceled after two seasons.

== Plot ==
"Run the World is the story of a group of Black women – vibrant, fiercely loyal best friends – who work, live and play in Harlem as they strive for world domination. At its core, it's an unapologetically female show about enviable friendship and not only surviving – but thriving together."

== Cast ==
=== Main ===
- Amber Stevens West as Whitney Green, a banker and people-pleasing type-A woman planning her wedding to her fiancé, Ola
- Andrea Bordeaux as Ella McFair (season 1), a writer in her early 30s adjusting to her new job at the website Hot Tea Digest, in the wake of an unsuccessful debut book release
- Bresha Webb as Renee Ross, a funny and audacious marketing professional in a deteriorating marriage
- Corbin Reid as Sondi Hill, a doctoral student in a clandestine relationship with her dissertation advisor, Matthewl
- Tosin Morohunfola as Olabisi "Ola" Adeyemo, a Nigerian-American physician and Whitney's fiancé
- Stephen Bishop as Matthew Powell, a college professor, single father to his young daughter Amari, and Sondi's boyfriend and thesis advisor

=== Recurring ===
- Erika Alexander as Barb, Ella's boss at the entertainment website Hot Tea Digest
- Jay Walker as Jason, Renee's husband
- Nick Sagar as Anderson
- Ellie Reine as Amari Powell, Matthew's young daughter
- Tika Sumpter as Amari's biological mother back from duty with the Navy (season 2)
- Comedian CP as Preston Thurgood (season 2)
- Isha Blaaker as Philip Houston, Whitney's former business school rival (season 2)

=== Guest ===
- Tonya Pinkins as Gwen Greene
- Rosie O'Donnell as Nancy, the therapist who sees Sondi, Ella, Whitney, and Renee separately (season 1)
- Cree Summer as Dr. Monica Mitchell, Whitney, Sondi, and Renee's new therapist (season 2)
- Ashley Blaine Featherson-Jenkins as India Blue, a successful singer-songwriter (season 2)

== Episodes ==
Season	Episodes	Originally released	
Season	Episodes	First released	Last released
1	8	May 16, 2021	July 11, 2021
2	8	May 26, 2023	July 14, 2023

=== Season 1 (2021) ===
No. overall	No. in season	Title	Directed by	Written by	Original release date	U.S. viewers (millions)
1	1	"Phenomenal Women"	Millicent Shelton	Leigh Davenport	May 16, 2021	0.060
2	2	"Because... ADOS"	Justin Tipping	Leigh Davenport	May 23, 2021	N/A
3	3	"What a Co-inky-dick"	Justin Tipping	Leigh Davenport	May 30, 2021	0.077
4	4	"I Love Harlem"	Justin Tipping	Leigh Davenport	June 6, 2021	0.100
5	5	"Plus Ones"	Jenée LaMarque	Njeri Brown	June 13, 2021	0.070
6	6	"My Therapist Says..."	Nastaran Dibai	Nastaran Dibai	June 27, 2021	0.070
7	7	"What You Wish For"	Jenée LaMarque	Niya Palmer	July 4, 2021	N/A
8	8	"Almost, Lady, Almost!"	Jenée LaMarque	Jess Pineda	July 11, 2021	0.060

=== Season 2 (2023) ===
No. overall	No. in season	Title	Directed by	Written by	Original release date	U.S. viewers (millions)
9	1	"A Dream Deferred"	Rachael Holder	Ester Lou Weithers	May 26, 2023	0.097
10	2	"Honeymoon's Over"	Rachael Holder	Jenny Lee	June 2, 2023	0.063
11	3	"Back to Business"	Princess Monique	Owen H. Smith	June 9, 2023	0.025
12	4	"A Woman's Worth"	Princess Monique	Kelechi Urama	June 16, 2023	0.043
13	5	"Homecoming"	Nick Wong	Jack Scacco	June 23, 2023	0.068
14	6	"A New Hope"	Nick Wong	Jenny Lee & Michelle Nation	June 30, 2023	0.039
15	7	"A Rage in Harlem"	Nastaran Dibai	Rachelle Williams-Benary	July 7, 2023	0.097
16	8	"No Regrets"	Nastaran Dibai	Ester Lou Weithers	July 14, 2023	0.080

== Production ==
=== Development ===
On October 14, 2019, it was announced that Starz ordered Run the World, the half-hour comedy pilot series created and written by Boomerang writer Leigh Davenport. She described the series as "a love letter to Black women and a love letter to Harlem." Davenport loosely based the series on her time living in Harlem, where she resided for 12 years working in media. She wanted the series to depict a group of well-rounded, supportive friends, in part to contrast the "skewed" representations of Black womanhood on popular reality television shows. While living in Harlem, she wrote the script for Run the World with no previous screenwriting experience, and continued to revise it over the course of a decade. In 2017 she moved to Los Angeles to pursue writing full-time. Eventually, the series was greenlit by Starz.

The series is produced by SisterLee Productions and Lionsgate Television, through Living Single creator Yvette Lee Bowser's overall deal. Davenport is co-executive producer with season one showrunner Bowser. Millicent Shelton is the pilot episode director. Additional directors include Justin Tipping, Jenée LaMarque, and Nastran Dibai. The show's stylists are Patricia Field (known for her work on Sex and the City) and Tracy L. Cox.

Starz ordered the pilot to series on January 30, 2020. On August 27, 2021, Starz renewed the series for a second season and it was announced that Rachelle Williams BenAry joined the series as showrunner, while Bowser remained as co-executive producer.

On September 25, 2023, Starz canceled the series after two seasons.

=== Casting ===
The casting of Amber Stevens West and Bresha Webb as series regulars was announced on October 14, 2019. The casting of additional lead cast members Corbin Reid, Stephen Bishop, and Andrea Bordeaux was announced on October 31, 2019. Erika Alexander, who starred in Bowser's series Living Single, was announced as a recurring cast member on November 2, 2020. Additional main cast member Tosin Morohunfola, recurring cast members Nick Sagar and Jay Walker, and guest Tonya Pinkins were announced on December 1, 2020. Rosie O'Donnell was cast as a therapist but was not announced until reviews of the show were released.

On February 4, 2022, Deadline reported that Bordeaux chose to leave the series due to the mandate that the cast and crew be vaccinated against COVID-19. Bordeaux disputed those reports and stated that she was fired for refusing to comply with the vaccine mandate. The role of Ella McFair would not be recast.

Additional cast members for season 2 were announced on April 28, 2022; Tika Sumpter, Comedian CP, and Isha Blaaker joined in recurring roles. Cree Summer and Ashley Blaine Featherson-Jenkins were announced as guest stars.

=== Filming ===
The production started filming as of October 29, 2020, on-location in Harlem and other locations around New York City.

== Release ==
An official teaser trailer was released on December 1, 2020, and the official trailer was released April 8, 2021. The series premiered on Starz on May 16, 2021, in the United States and Canada. Season two premiered on May 26, 2023.

== Reception ==
=== Critical reception ===
Run the World received critical acclaim. The first season holds a 100% rating on Rotten Tomatoes based on eight critics' reviews, with an average rating of 7.7/10.

Caroline Framke of Variety wrote of the series: "In telling stories about relationship dynamics and women staring down their thirties with a thrill of apprehension and determination, “Run the World” is telling timeless stories with its own vibrant spin." Critics noted similarities to the structure of Sex and the City as a show centering a group of fashionable friends in New York, but according to Kellie Carter Jackson of the New York Times, "that's where the similarities end. The essential fifth friend in "Run the World" is Harlem, and whether the four friends of "Run the World" are drinking nutcrackers from bodegas, shopping at the Malcolm Shabazz Harlem Market for African prints or accepting a plate at a street barbecue, they exude the ease of belonging to a Black community." Inkoo Kang of The Hollywood Reporter described the show as "Fizzy yet substantial, Run the World offers exactly the feeling you'd want while catching up with an old friend over cocktails: It's giddy, gossipy and gladdening." Aramide Tinibu of The A.V. Club rated the show a B+ and wrote positively of the relationships between the women: "They lean into one another for a warm embrace or sometimes even a quippy admonishment...There's a familiarity and a tenderness that runs through their relationships...they voice their realistic and relevant opinions about each other's lives—welcomed or otherwise—out of a desire to see each other thrive."

=== Awards and nominations ===
Year	Award	Category	Recipient(s)	Result	Ref.
2021	Black Reel Awards for Television	Outstanding Comedy Series	Yvette Lee Bowser	Nominated	
2021	Black Reel Awards for Television	Outstanding Actress, Comedy Series	Bresha Webb	Nominated	
2021	Black Reel Awards for Television	Outstanding Guest Actress, Comedy Series	Erika Alexander	Won	
2021	Women's Image Awards	Outstanding Comedy Series	Run the World	Won	
2021	Women's Image Awards	Outstanding Show Produced By a Woman	Yvette Lee Bowser (for "Phenomenal Women")	Nominated	
2021	Women's Image Awards	Outstanding Film or Show Written By a Woman	Leigh Davenport (for "Phenomenal Women")	Nominated	
2021	Women's Image Awards	Outstanding Actress Comedy Series	Bresha Webb (for "Phenomenal Women")	Won	
2021	Gotham Awards	Breakthrough Series – Short Format	Run the World	Nominated	
2022	NAACP Image Awards	Outstanding Comedy Series	Run the World	Nominated	
2022	NAACP Image Awards	Outstanding Guest Performance	Erika Alexander	Nominated	
