= List of Living Single episodes =

This is a list of all television sitcom episodes for Living Single.

== Series overview ==
Season	Episodes	Originally released		Rank	Viewers (millions)
Season	Episodes	First released	Last released	Rank	Viewers (millions)
1	27	August 22, 1993	May 15, 1994	#56	16.53
2	27	September 1, 1994	May 18, 1995	#84	13.79
3	27	August 31, 1995	May 9, 1996	#111	9.99
4	24	August 29, 1996	May 8, 1997	#104	9.35
5	13	September 11, 1997	January 1, 1998	#117	7.08

== Episodes ==
=== Season 1 (1993–94) ===
No. overall	No. in season	Title	Directed by	Written by	Original release date	Prod. code	Viewers (millions)
1	1	"Judging by the Cover"	Tony Singletary	Yvette Denise Lee	August 22, 1993	475074	15.1
Khadijah and Synclaire must find a diplomatic way to tell Regine her new boyfriend, Brad Hamilton (Cylk Cozart) is married.
2	2	"I'll Take Your Man"	Tony Singletary	Yvette Denise Lee	August 29, 1993	455752	17.1
Regine's jealousy affects Khadijah and Synclaire when Maxine begins dating her ex-boyfriend (Charles Penland).
3	3	"Whose Date Is It Anyway?"	Tony Singletary	Becky Hartman	September 5, 1993	455753	11.9
After giving Synclaire dating advice, Khadijah, Regine, and Maxine follow her to the restaurant and end up causing a scene.
4	4	"A Kiss Before Lying"	Ellen Falcon	Daniel Margosis & Robert Horn	September 12, 1993	455754	15.7
Maxine persuades Kyle to act as her boyfriend when an old flame comes to dinner.
5	5	"In the Black Is Beautiful"	Tony Singletary	David Cohen & Roger S. H. Schulman	September 19, 1993	455751	15.2
Khadijah borrows money from Maxine to keep Flavor in business, which starts to ruin their friendship.
6	6	"Great Expectations"	Ellen Falcon	Calvin Brown, Jr.	September 26, 1993	455755	17.2
The girls visit a nightclub searching for their dream men but find only nightmares.
7	7	"Full Court Press"	Ellen Falcon	David Cohen & Roger S. H. Schulman	October 3, 1993	455756	16.2
A minor traffic accident leaves Khadijah, Regine, and Synclaire in need of a good lawyer.
8	8	"Living Single... with Children"	Ellen Falcon	Lore Kimbrough	October 10, 1993	455757	16.1
Regine agrees to babysit her new boyfriend's (Dominic Hoffman) daughter and gets a quick lesson in motherhood.
9	9	"Just Friends?"	Ellen Falcon	Bernadette Luckett	October 17, 1993	455758	16.9
Khadijah fears a night of passion may damage her friendship with Scooter.
10	10	"Quittin' Time"	Ellen Falcon	Daniel Margosis & Robert Horn	October 24, 1993	455759	17.4
Khadijah tries to break in a new secretary after Synclaire quits.
11	11	"The Naked Truth"	Ellen Falcon	Becky Hartman & Yvette Denise Lee	November 7, 1993	455760	16.3
Overton moves in with the girls after a fight with Kyle but drives them crazy.
12	12	"Crappy Birthday"	Jim Drake	Tom Anderson & Yvette Denise Lee	November 14, 1993	455761	15.0
While celebrating Khadijah's birthday, Synclaire hits the jackpot in Atlantic City. Guest stars: Ed McMahon and Flip Wilson
13	13	"Love Takes a Holiday"	Ellen Falcon	Nastaran Dibai & Jeffrey B. Hodes	November 21, 1993	455762	17.9
Kyle falls in love with Khadijah and Synclaire's friend (Nia Long), but she isn't willing to commit.
14	14	"Burglar in the House"	Ellen Falcon	Becky Hartman & Yvette Denise Lee	November 28, 1993	455763	N/A
Overton installs a high-tech alarm in the girls' apartment after Regine is mugged.
15	15	"Living Kringle"	Ellen Falcon	David Cohen & Roger S. H. Schulman	December 19, 1993	455764	16.5
Synclaire's holiday effervescence teaches everyone the true meaning of Christmas.
16	16	"Fatal Distraction"	Henry Chan	David Wyatt	January 9, 1994	455765	17.5
Khadijah hires a handsome writer (Richard Whiten) without first checking his references.
17	17	"The Hand That Robs the Cradle"	Ellen Gittelsohn	Daniel Margosis & Robert Horn	January 16, 1994	455766	16.8
Maxine thinks she has to hide her relationship with a younger man (Terrence Dashon Howard) from her friends.
18	18	"Love Thy Neighbor"	Rob Schiller	Nastaran Dibai & Jeffrey B. Hodes	February 6, 1994	455767	16.6
The arrival of a handsome new neighbor (Morris Chestnut) causes friction between Maxine, Khadijah, and Regine.
19	19	"Mystery Date"	Ellen Gittelsohn	Becky Hartman	February 13, 1994	455768	18.9
Maxine, Khadijah, and Regine continue to pursue their neighbor, but only one will get to date him.
20	20	"Hot Fun in the Wintertime"	Ellen Gittelsohn	Bernadette Luckett	February 20, 1994	455769	15.6
Synclaire must decide between Khadijah and Overton to take on a Bahamas vacation for two.
21	21	"Friends Like These"	Ellen Gittelsohn	Ellen Svaco & Colleen Taber	February 27, 1994	455770	17.8
A friend (Charnele Brown) from Khadijah's college visits and takes advantage of her success. Arsenio Hall guest stars as himself.
22	22	"Who's the Boss?"	Terri McCoy	Nastaran Dibai & Jeffrey B. Hodes	March 13, 1994	455771	17.6
Synclaire offers to run Flavor while Khadijah is sick.
23	23	"Five Card Stud"	Rob Schiller	Barra Grant & Ian Praiser	March 27, 1994	455772	18.5
When Regine dates Kyle's boss (Bobby Hosea), he overhears him maligning her reputation.
24	24	"Love Is a Many Splintered Thing"	Henry Chan	Lore Kimbrough	April 17, 1994	455773	15.7
Khadijah neglects her roommates when she begins a new romance.
25	25	"A Tale of Two Tattles"	Jim Drake	Warren Hutcherson	May 1, 1994	455774	15.9
Regine's friend, Tony Ross (Mark Curry), uses material she told him in confidence in his stand-up comedy routine.
26	26	"She Ain't Heavy, She's My Mother"	Ellen Gittelsohn	Ellen Svaco & Colleen Taber	May 8, 1994	455775	18.5
When Khadijah's mother (Rita Owens) visits on Mother's Day, she brings Laverne (Chip Fields), Regine's estranged mother.
27	27	"What's Next?"	Ellen Gittelsohn	Yvette Denise Lee	May 15, 1994	455776	16.0
Khadijah must choose between Alonzo (Adam Lazarre-White) and Terrence (Cress Williams), who announces he wants her back.

=== Season 2 (1994–95) ===
No. overall	No. in season	Title	Directed by	Written by	Original release date	Prod. code	Viewers (millions)
28	1	"There's Got to Be a Morning After"	Ellen Gittelsohn	Yvette Lee Bowser	September 1, 1994	456551	14.9
Maxine and Kyle spend the night together after drowning their sorrows in a bottle of tequila.
29	2	"I Love This Game"	Ellen Gittelsohn	Warren Hutcherson	September 8, 1994	456553	13.4
Putting her basketball MVP title on the line, Khadijah plays a grudge match against her high-school rival (Cheryl Miller).
30	3	"They've Gotta Have It"	Ellen Gittelsohn	Roger S. H. Schulman & David Cohen	September 15, 1994	456552	14.3
Maxine and Regine decide to decrease their dependence on men by taking a motivational seminar; Overton sends gifts to Synclaire.
31	4	"Working Nine to Nine-Fifteen"	Ellen Gittelsohn	Becky Hartman	September 22, 1994	456554	13.3
Maxine gets re-hired at her law firm and then quits after learning her cases and office have been taken away.
32	5	"Bristle While You Work"	Ellen Gittelsohn	Daniel Margosis & Robert Horn	September 29, 1994	456555	13.1
When Regine creates an ad in Flavor, tension rises between her and Khadijah.
33	6	"School Daze"	John Bowab	Jeffrey B. Hodes & Nastaran Dibai	October 6, 1994	456556	12.8
Synclaire decides to drop out of her night-school art history class after Overton enrolls to spend more time with her.
34	7	"Am I My Sister's Keeper?"	John Bowab	Eunetta T. Boone	October 13, 1994	456557	13.2
Overton's younger sister comes for a visit and falls for Kyle; Regine decides to become a vegetarian and forces her friends to as well.
35	8	"Trick or Trust"	Henry Chan	Arthur Harris & Edward C. Evans	October 27, 1994	456558	16.4
Khadijah becomes convinced Scooter is cheating on her when Regine finds evidence in his apartment. Guest star: Cress Williams as Scooter
36	9	"Abstinence Makes the Heart Grow Fonder"	Ellen Gittelsohn	Daniel Margosis & Robert Horn	November 3, 1994	456559	14.6
Synclaire and Overton must decide if they're ready for a sexual relationship.
37	10	"Double Indignity"	Ellen Gittelsohn	Nastaran Dibai & Jeffrey B. Hodes	November 10, 1994	456560	13.4
Maxine gets a new job selling subliminal tapes for a telemarketing company.
38	11	"My Cups Runneth Over"	Ellen Gittelsohn	Yvette Lee Bowser & Becky Hartman	November 17, 1994	456561	16.8
Regine has trouble facing herself when she's advised to have breast reduction surgery to help her overburdened back.
39	12	"Thanks for Giving"	Ellen Gittelsohn	Roger S. H. Schulman & Yvette Lee Bowser	November 24, 1994	456562	13.4
Things become tense during Thanksgiving when Maxine's, Kyle's, and Regine's dates clash. Guest stars: Heavy D and Deion Sanders
40	13	"A Hair-Razing Experience"	Ellen Gittelsohn	David Wyatt	December 8, 1994	456563	14.1
Kyle has to decide whether or not to cut his hair after he's told the style doesn't fit the corporate image.
41	14	"There's No Ship Like Kinship"	Matthew Diamond	Warren Hutcherson	December 15, 1994	456564	12.5
The jealousy flies when an old friend of Khadijah's gets a job at Flavor and starts hanging out with Synclaire. Guest star: Rosie O'Donnell as Sheri
42	15	"Singing the Blues"	Ellen Gittelsohn	David Steven Cohen	January 5, 1995	456565	14.1
Maxine's presence disrupts Kyle's singing at a local talent contest; Regine coaches Khadijah for her interview.
43	16	"Play Ball"	Ellen Gittelsohn	Eunetta T. Boone	January 12, 1995	456566	12.7
The Flavor staff strike after becoming fed up with malfunctioning office equipment. Guest star: Bobby Bonilla
44	17	"Stormy Weather"	Ellen Gittelsohn	Becky Hartman	February 2, 1995	456568	15.3
Regine and Overton get stuck in a van during a blizzard while their friends are snowed in at home. Guest star: Roxanne Beckford
45	18	"The Last Temptation"	Henry Chan	Jeffrey B. Hodes & Nastaran Dibai	February 9, 1995	456567	16.3
Synclaire is sent reeling after an attractive classmate, Jon Marc, kisses her. Guest star: Shemar Moore
46	19	"Legal Briefs"	Henry Chan	Eunetta T. Boone	February 16, 1995	456570	14.7
Things heat up for Maxine when she finds out that her new boss, Preston August, is her former boyfriend. Guest star: Phil Morris
47	20	"If the Crew Fits"	Ellen Gittelsohn	Daniel Margosis & Robert Horn	February 23, 1995	456569	14.5
Regine and Darryl second-guess their relationship after she fails to hit it off with his friends.
48	21	"Space Invaders"	Rae Kraus	Edward C. Evans & Arthur Harris	March 9, 1995	456571	15.3
Kyle becomes annoyed with Overton and Synclaire's relationship; Maxine tries to recover a compromising tape of herself.
49	22	"Another Saturday Night"	John Bowab	Warren Hutcherson	March 30, 1995	456572	13.8
Khadijah and Synclaire help Overton get revenge on pool sharks, Kyle has a date with a princess, and Maxine goes to New Jersey to get a tattoo.
50	23	"Who's Scooping Who?"	Ellen Gittelsohn	Nastaran Dibai & Jeffrey B. Hodes	April 13, 1995	456574	10.9
Khadijah tries to scoop a rival reporter on a story about a boxing scandal. Guest stars: Roberto Durán, Kadeem Hardison and Kelly Perine
51	24	"Raw Talent"	John Bowab	Jennie Ayers & Susan Sebastian	April 27, 1995	456573	11.3
Synclaire's role in a theatrical production is expanded, and she has to decide if she can play the part. Guest stars: Naughty by Nature
52	25	"To Grandmother's House We Go"	Ellen Gittelsohn	Lisa Albert	May 4, 1995	456575	12.2
Regine and Khadijah's mothers go on vacation, leaving them to babysit Khadijah's grandmother (Barbara Montgomery).
53	26	"Talk Showdown"	Ellen Gittelsohn	Meg DeLoatch	May 11, 1995	456576	12.9
An appearance on a talk show about "Roommates From Heaven" ends with Regine packing her bags. Guest stars: Jenifer Lewis and Will Ferrell
54	27	"The Shake-Up"	Ellen Gittelsohn	Yvette Lee Bowser	May 18, 1995	456577	12.2
Khadijah doesn't take Regine's threat of moving out seriously until she leaves. Guest star: Regina King

=== Season 3 (1995–96) ===
No. overall	No. in season	Title	Directed by	Written by	Original release date	Prod. code	Viewers (millions)
55	1	"Come Back Little Diva"	Ellen Gittelsohn	Yvette Lee Bowser	August 31, 1995	457351	11.6
After Regine moves out, she throws a housewarming party which Khadijah crashes after not being invited.
56	2	"The Ex-File"	Ellen Gittelsohn	Roger S. H. Schulman	September 7, 1995	457352	10.9
Regine moves back into the apartment, but she has to adjust to all the changes. Overton's ex is in town, and things get complicated.
57	3	"On the Rebound"	Ellen Gittelsohn	Eunetta T. Boone	September 14, 1995	457353	11.0
Khadijah has an interview with NBA baller (Grant Hill). After a small incident, sparks fly and a fling develops.
58	4	"Grumpy Old Man"	Henry Chan	Becky Hartman	September 21, 1995	457354	10.6
Kyle's 30th birthday brings him depression, back pain and a special gift from Maxine.
59	5	"Rags to Riches"	Rae Kraus	Jim Pond & Bill Fuller	September 28, 1995	457355	9.8
Regine is disgusted when the boutique is converted into a discount store but luckily impresses a soap opera wardrobe consultant with her knowledge of tackiness.
60	6	"The James Bond"	Leonard R. Garner, Jr.	Warren Hutcherson	October 5, 1995	457356	10.9
Khadijah and Synclaire disagree over how to spend a savings bond they opened as teens. Kyle sulks when he learns he has fewer names in his little black book than Maxine.
61	7	"The Handyman Can"	Otis Sallid	Chris Sheridan	October 12, 1995	457357	9.0
Overton considers another career when his work keeps falling apart.
62	8	"He Works Hard for the Money"	Henry Chan	Arthur Harris & Ed Evans	October 19, 1995	457358	9.5
Kyle gets a lucrative job working for a famous actress, but she wants more than he expected. Guest Star: Eartha Kitt
63	9	"Baby I'm Back... Again"	Ellen Gittelsohn	Kriss Turner	November 2, 1995	457359	11.5
Scooter returns and proposes to Khadijah.
64	10	"Mr. Big Shot"	Ellen Gittelsohn	Chuck Tatham	November 9, 1995	457360	10.3
Overton has the chance to win $10,000 on a 3-point shot at halftime at a Knicks game, but Synclaire jinxes him. Guest Star: Alonzo Mourning
65	11	"Mommy Not Dearest"	Ellen Gittelsohn	Becky Hartman Edwards	November 16, 1995	457361	11.2
Max's mother (CCH Pounder) wants to have a deeper relationship with her. Khadijah meets Dean Cain and Burt Ward in an effort to return a wallet to the rightful owner.
66	12	"The Following Is a Sponsored Program"	Ellen Gittelsohn	Chuck Tatham	November 30, 1995	457362	10.9
Maxine gets an acting role that Synclaire wanted, but they create a unique solution together. Overton repeatedly dreams about a sexy singing group. Guest Stars: TLC
67	13	"Let It Snow, Let It Snow, Let It Snow... Dammit"	Rae Kraus	Jim Pond & Bill Fuller	December 14, 1995	457364	10.8
Overton tries to organize a traditional Christmas at his family's remote Canadian cabin. Unfortunately, it's not the same as he remembered it.
68	14	"I'm Ready for My Close-Up"	Otis Sallid	Eunetta T. Boone	January 4, 1996	457363	11.1
Synclarie tries to convince Regine to help her get an acting role by using her business contacts. Khadijah and Maxine work together on an article.
69	15	"Scoop Dreams"	Ellen Gittelsohn	Warren Hutcherson	January 25, 1996	457366	9.3
New journalist Ivan gets a scoop on his first day working at Flavor. Meanwhile, Overton is hurt that Kyle is asked to be godfather for a friend's newborn son instead of him.
70	16	"Likes Father, Likes Son"	Ellen Gittelsohn	Daniel Margosis & Robert Horn	February 1, 1996	457365	9.0
Regine discovers that she is dating both a father and son. Guest Stars: Mario Van Peebles & Melvin Van Peebles
71	17	"Wake Up to the Break-Up"	Ellen Gittelsohn	Arthur Harris & Edward C. Evans	February 1, 1996	457368	11.0
Khadijah lies to save Russell from being deported. Kyle dumps Maxine when he grows tired of a relationship without affection or respect. Special Guest Star: Brian McKnight
72	18	"Tibby or Not Tibby"	Henry Chan	Kriss Turner	February 8, 1996	457367	10.3
Overton's beloved Uncle Tibby visits and urges him to dump Synclaire. Maxine taunts Kyle about their breakup, but Regine thinks she has regrets.
73	19	"Shrink to Fit"	Ellen Gittelsohn	Roger S.H. Schulman	February 15, 1996	457369	9.0
Khadijah has too much stress in her life and visits a psychiatrist (Jasmine Guy). Overton reacts strangely to Synclaire's new job as a clown.
74	20	"Dear John"	Henry Chan	Chris Sheridan	February 29, 1996	457370	10.9
Kyle's sexy date wants romance from Overton. Maxine forges Regine's signature on a mean letter to Regine's boyfriend.
75	21	"A Raze in Harlem"	Ellen Gittelsohn	Chuck Tatham	March 7, 1996	457371	9.4
In a fantasy sequence, the gang goes back to the roaring '20s to save a jazz club from destruction.
76	22	"Woman to Woman"	Rae Kraus	Jim Pond & Bill Fuller	March 21, 1996	457372	9.3
When college friend Shayla visits, Maxine is both stunned to learn she's marrying a woman and hurt that Shayla never told her she was gay.
77	23	"Glass Ceiling"	Kim Fields Freeman	Kriss Turner	April 4, 1996	457373	9.3
Kyle's unhappy with his promotion, which has removed him from client contact. Regine denies worrying that her artist boyfriend works with nude models.
78	24	"Kiss of the Spider-Man"	Maynard C. Virgil I	Fred Johnson	April 11, 1996	457375	8.0
Maxine is upset when one of her clients (Giancarlo Esposito) appears to be guilty, and she is attracted to him.
79	25	"What Ever Happened to Baby Sister?"	Ellen Gittelsohn	Eunetta T. Boone	April 25, 1996	457374	8.7
Khadijah babysits her spoiled half-sister Stephanie (Tatyana Ali), a promising athlete who seems determined to throw away her future.
80	26	"Compromising Positions"	Gil Junger	Warren Hutcherson	May 9, 1996	457376	8.3
Regine's mother catches her and Keith having sex. Overton decides to propose to Synclaire.
81	27	"The Engagement: Part 1"	Ellen Gittelsohn	Becky Hartman Edwards	May 9, 1996	457377	8.3
Overton's attempts to propose to Synclaire are repeatedly thwarted. Maxine's opponent in a local election tries to damage her reputation. Khadijah's publishing career may be over. To be continued...

=== Season 4 (1996–97) ===
No. overall	No. in season	Title	Directed by	Written by	Original release date	Prod. code	Viewers (millions)
82	1	"The Engagement: Part 2"	Ellen Gittelsohn	Roger S. H. Schulman	August 29, 1996	466001	8.7
Overton finally proposes to Synclaire. Khadijah could lose her business because of a lawsuit.
83	2	"Ride the Maverick"	Gil Junger	Jim Pond & Bill Fuller	August 29, 1996	466002	8.7
Maxine's withdrawal from the city council campaign has an unexpected effect.
84	3	"Not Quite Mr. Right"	Rae Kraus	Jacque Edmonds	September 5, 1996	466003	10.4
Regine encounters romantic problems with her boyfriend when she becomes attracted to Russell. Maxine and Kyle argue over parking spaces.
85	4	"Not So Silent Partner"	Rae Kraus	Chuck Tatham	September 12, 1996	466005	9.1
Khadijah sells 25% of the magazine to Majestic Publishing and has to cope with a sneaky corporate liaison, Jeremy.
86	5	"Moi the Jury"	Ellen Gittelsohn	Kriss Turner	September 19, 1996	466006	10.0
Regine is the lone jury member who thinks the defendant in an arson case is guilty.
87	6	"Multiple Choice"	Rae Kraus	Chris Sheridan	September 26, 1996	466004	10.6
Synclarie and Overton are surprised by the results of a compatibility test. Maxine pursues a waiter who won't date her. Guest Star: Dorien Wilson as Reverend Taylor
88	7	"I've Got You Under My Skin"	Rae Kraus	Clayvon C. Harris	October 31, 1996	466008	8.4
Khadijah freezes up when she realizes her date was the anesthesiologist of her hemorrhoid operation.
89	8	"School's Out Forever"	Rae Kraus	Arthur Harris & Edward C. Evans	November 7, 1996	466007	9.5
Kyle seeks revenge at his high school reunion, but the old class bully manages to turn the tables once more.
90	9	"Do You Take This Man's Wallet?"	Ellen Gittelsohn	Chuck Tatham	November 14, 1996	466012	10.5
Regine is hired to coordinate a friend's (Heavy D) wedding but begins to worry when she realizes his fiancé (Vivica A. Fox) is just after his money.
91	10	"Virgin Territory"	Rae Kraus	Jacque Edmonds	November 21, 1996	466009	11.0
Maxine's new boyfriend has never had sex.
92	11	"Riot on the Set"	Gil Junger	Warren Hutcherson	December 5, 1996	466010	8.8
After getting a starring role in a play, a flustered Synclaire turns the seemingly doomed production into a hit with her ad-libs.
93	12	"Doctor in the House"	Gil Junger	Warren Hutcherson	December 19, 1996	466011	9.2
Khadijah worries that Charles has jeopardized his career by defending her at a snobby awards ceremony and angers him by asking his boss to smooth things over.
94	13	"Mother Inferior"	Chuck Vinson	Gene Miller & Karen Kavner	January 9, 1997	466013	10.46
Regine's mother makes the society page when she begins dating a millionaire. Overton discovers his police auction purchase has connections to a former mob boss.
95	14	"The Clown That Roared"	Rae Kraus	Chris Sheridan	January 23, 1997	466014	9.71
Synclaire's job as a clown is anything but funny. Khadijah and Regine claim award-winning cookies.
96	15	"Back in the Day"	Ellen Gittelsohn	Story by : Yvette Lee Bowser; Teleplay by : Jacque Edmonds	January 30, 1997	466019	10.66
On the way to an awards ceremony, Khadijah reminisces about her magazine's origins and the early days of her friendships.
97	16	"Oh, Solo Mio"	Ellen Gittelsohn	Clayvon C. Harris	February 20, 1997	466017	8.88
New choir director Kyle agrees to let Regine sing a solo in church, but she's a horrible singer.
98	17	"Playing House"	Rae Kraus	Jim Pond & Bill Fuller	March 6, 1997	466015	10.11
Maxine and Kyle pretend to go out of town for the weekend, but they're meeting for a romantic getaway. Overton and Synclaire try out cohabitation but get into a fight.
99	18	"Swing Out Sisters"	Chuck Vinson	Chuck Tatham	March 20, 1997	466016	9.24
The girls take a Saturday night together to catch up and end up at a gay bar. Kyle entertains his boss at Overton's pay-per-view boxing party.
100	19	"Moonlight Savings Time"	Chuck Vinson	Edward C. Evans & Arthur Harris	April 3, 1997	466020	8.10
Overton's handyman job gets Maxine evicted. Khadijah, Regine, and Synclaire hire a male housekeeper.
101	20	"Living Single Undercover"	Kim Fields Freeman	David M. Matthews	April 10, 1997	466021	8.12
Synclaire helps Overton accept the loss of the Cleveland Browns while Khadijah and Maxine search for proof of a City Hall scandal. Jim Brown guest stars as himself.
102	21	"One Degree of Separation"	Gil Junger	Kriss Turner	April 17, 1997	466018	9.24
At her engagement party, Synclaire learns her parents are separated. Regine is determined to prove that Maxine and Kyle are dating.
103	22	"Too Good to Screw"	Ellen Gittelsohn	Jacqueline Davis	April 24, 1997	466022	9.02
Synclaire's bachelorette party gets wild at Madonna's penthouse. Kyle's younger brother causes tension between him and Overton.
104	23	"Papa Was a Rolling Stone"	Ellen Gittelsohn	Warren Hutcherson	May 8, 1997	466023	8.07
Khadijah is unhappy that her estranged father arrives for Synclaire's wedding. Maxine threatens Overton if he tells anyone about her and Kyle.
105	24	"Never Can Say Goodbye"	Ellen Gittelsohn	Jim Pond & Bill Fuller	May 8, 1997	466024	8.07
Maxine stuns Kyle with a last-moment declaration, Super Bowl MVP Desmond Howard asks a depressed Regine to dinner, and Overton and Synclaire finally get married.

=== Season 5 (1997–98) ===
No. overall	No. in season	Title	Directed by	Written by	Original release date	Prod. code	Viewers (millions)
106	1	"Love Don't Live Here Anymore: Part 1"	Ellen Gittelsohn	Jim Pond & Bill Fuller	September 11, 1997	466851	7.18
Khadijah and Regine meet their new roommate, handsome songwriter Tripp. Overton and Synclaire embark on an adventurous honeymoon cruise. To be continued.... First appearance as a main cast member: Mel Jackson as Ira Lee "Tripp" Williams III
107	2	"Love Don't Live Here Anymore: Part 2"	Ellen Gittelsohn	Nancylee Myatt	September 18, 1997	466852	6.41
Kyle and Maxine say goodbye when he accepts a job in London. Overton and Synclaire continue their honeymoon in Hawai'i despite misgivings about marriage. Last appearance as a main cast member: T.C. Carson as Kyle Barker
108	3	"High Anxiety"	Ellen Gittelsohn	Chris Sheridan	September 25, 1997	466853	7.61
Khadijah humiliates herself on a date with professional basketball player Cedric Ceballos (himself).
109	4	"Reconcilable Differences"	Ellen Gittelsohn	Gene Miller & Karen Kavner	October 16, 1997	466854	6.39
Regine wants to get closer to a new man, but his dog comes between them. Synclaire and Overton argue after he loses money gambling.
110	5	"The Best Laid Plans"	Chuck Vinson	Clayvon C. Harris	October 23, 1997	466855	7.73
Maxine's plan to date her former law professor is thwarted when she learns Khadijah had a brief affair with him. Regine and Tripp argue about proper roommate etiquette.
111	6	"Up the Ladder Through the Roof"	Ellen Gittelsohn	Clayvon C. Harris	October 30, 1997	466859	6.85
A dream sequence transports the gang back to the 1960's as Motown singers. Guest Star: Chaka Khan
112	7	"He's the One"	J.D. Lobue	Lisa Michelle Payton	November 6, 1997	466857	7.09
Regine is enamored with a millionaire who hires her to cater for an important charity event. Maxine surprises Overton and Synclaire with a generous wedding present.
113	8	"Three Men and a Buckeye"	J.D. Lobue	Janette Kotichas Burleigh	November 13, 1997	466860	7.63
Overton, Tripp, and Russell pick up a beautiful but criminal hitchhiker en route to a football game. Dexter asks Regine to marry him. Guest Star: T-Boz as Hitchhiker/Camille
114	9	"Forgive Us Our Trespasses"	Ellen Gittelsohn	Nancylee Myatt	December 4, 1997	466858	6.75
A strange client, who claims to be Jesus, helps Maxine believe in her ability to practice law.
115	10	"Misleading Lady"	Chuck Vinson	Rod J. Emelle	December 11, 1997	466856	6.87
Synclaire disguises herself as a man to join an acting troupe. Khadijah may have found a new career, after she helps Tripp write a new song. Note: Final appearance of Kim Fields as Regine Hunter.
116	11	"In Your Dreams"	Maynard C. Virgil I	Gene Miller & Karen Kavner	December 18, 1997	466861	6.93
Maxine, Khadijah, and Synclaire rejuvenate themselves at a spiritual retreat and question their futures. As a result, Maxine decides to have a child.
117	12	"To Catch a Thief"	Ellen Gittelsohn	Story by : Rod J. Emelle; Teleplay by : Chris Sheridan	January 1, 1998	466862	6.54
Synclaire is outraged that her comedy act has been stolen by another actor. Maxine gets pregnant by artificial insemination.
118	13	"Let's Stay Together"	Ellen Gittelsohn	Story by : Yvette Lee Bowser; Teleplay by : Jim Pond & Bill Fuller	January 1, 1998	466863	8.18
In the series finale, Max finds out Kyle is her unborn baby’s sperm donor after Overton notices the sperm donor’s profile matches Kyle’s description and was chosen from the same clinic where Kyle previously donated, following a near-death experience that made him think about extending the Barker family line. The gang throws together an impromptu New Years’ Eve party and invites Kyle, who is asked by Overton to make a stop in New York after visiting his family in Cleveland for the holidays, to attend. Synclaire gets the role of the renegade nun in a TV pilot, but is upset that the job is in California and she will have to leave Khadijah behind. Khadijah gets a surprise visit from Scooter. Note: T.C. Carson returns as Kyle Barker.
