= The Perfect Find =

2023 film by Numa Perrier

- Official release poster
- Directed by: Numa Perrier
- Screenplay by: Leigh Davenport
- Based on: The Perfect Find by Tia Williams
- Produced by: Glendon Palmer; Gabrielle Union; Jeff Morrone; Tommy Oliver; Codie Elaine Oliver
- Starring: Gabrielle Union; Keith Powers; Aisha Hinds; DB Woodside; Alani "La La" Anthony; Gina Torres
- Cinematography: Eric Lin
- Edited by: Paul Millspaugh
- Music by: Amanda Jones
- Production companies: AGC Studios; Confluential Films; I'll Have Another; HR Entertainment
- Distributed by: Netflix
- Release dates: June 14, 2023 (Tribeca); June 23, 2023
- Running time: 99 minutes
- Country: United States
- Language: English

The Perfect Find is a 2023 American romantic comedy film written by Leigh Davenport and directed by Numa Perrier. It is based on the book of the same name by Tia Williams. The film stars Gabrielle Union, Keith Powers, Aisha Hinds, D. B. Woodside, La La Anthony and Gina Torres.

The Perfect Find had its world premiere at the Tribeca Festival on June 14, 2023, and was released by Netflix on June 23, 2023.

== Plot ==
Forty-year-old Jenna Jones, recently dumped by her long-time boyfriend Brian, finds herself starting over after her mother kicks her out. Moving back to New York City, she transitions into a career in beauty journalism. To secure a job, Jenna asks her frenemy, Darcy, for help and lands a position as Creative Director at Darzine on a three-month trial basis.

One night, after a night out with friends, Jenna meets, bonds with, and kisses a man 15 years her junior. The next day at work, she is introduced to the same younger man, who turns out to be Darcy’s son Eric and the new videographer at the company.

Jenna and Eric begin collaborating on a rebranding campaign for the magazine’s subscription relaunch. They agree to keep their night together a secret. However, their first assignment—a visit to the elusive designer Greta Blumen—ends in failure, leading to a heated argument between the two. They don’t speak over the weekend but reconcile the following Monday.

Jenna invites Eric and his friends to a dinner she’s hosting with her friends, hoping to introduce them to 50-year-old Jimmy, a perpetual bachelor with a chip on his shoulder. Jimmy antagonizes Eric, but after the dinner, Jenna and Eric spend some private time together. The next day, Jenna shares her passion for classic films and proposes a tribute to couture called Perfect Find, a campaign that draws on nostalgia for old-school glamor. They collaborate with designers and influencers to make the project a success.

As they work together on the campaign, Jenna and Eric continue to grow closer. A celebration on the Brooklyn Bridge ends with them back at her apartment. Eric opens up about his father, Otis, who died when he was two, and shares his dream of making a film about him. Jenna tells him about her past with Brian, her college boyfriend turned high-profile partner, who she once thought would be her forever.

The success of their Perfect Find campaign leads to a major surge in subscriptions, surpassing 1 million. Brian is featured in Forbes, where he expresses regret about losing Jenna, and the New York Times contacts Darcy to feature her as a media mogul. However, when the article is published, the focus is more on Jenna and Eric’s work together.

Jenna becomes jealous when Eric’s ex, Madison, shows up at a children’s party. Their argument leads Eric to storm off, ignoring her calls. That evening, Brian shows up at Jenna’s apartment, grieving the loss of his mother. Jenna offers to drive him home, which Eric witnesses. Later, when Eric isolates himself, working from home, Jenna sneaks into Darcy’s penthouse to find him. They reconcile, but Darcy catches them in an intimate moment. Jenna is fired, and Eric doesn’t stand up for their relationship to his mother. He moves out and starts working on his own film project, and the two become estranged.

After the New Year, Jenna reaches out to Eric, inviting him to meet at a cafe. She’s now teaching a fashion-in-film course at Columbia University, and Eric has received a grant to work on his film about Otis. Jenna reveals she is pregnant, showing him her first sonogram, but he angrily leaves, upset by the news.

Eventually, Darcy, who has been estranged from her own family, shows up at Jenna’s apartment and announces they are now family. Eric accompanies Jenna to her next obstetrician appointment, and later, they attend the Darzine Gala together, officially going public with their relationship.

== Cast ==
- Gabrielle Union as Jenna
- Keith Powers as Eric
- Gina Torres as Darcy
- Alani "La La" Anthony as Elodie
- Aisha Hinds as Billie
- Janet Hubert as Monica
- Shayna McHale as Carlita
- Latoia Fitzgerald as Becca
- Steelo Brim as Tim
- DB Woodside as Brian
- Lina Green as Jinx
- Erica Jaye Green as Terry
- Jay Jean as Cassidy
- Winnie Harlow as Suki
- T.S. Madison as Greta
- Phoenix Noelle as May
- Godfrey as Jimmy
- Remy Ma as Remy / Carmen
- Numa Perrier as Pearl
- Yrsa Daley-Ward as Cleo
- Leigh Davenport as Aretha

== Production ==
=== Development ===
On November 6, 2018, it was announced that Gabrielle Union would produce and star in The Perfect Find, a film adaptation of the 2016 novel by Tia Williams. Tommy Oliver and Codie Elaine Oliver produced the film for Confluential Films, with Union co-producing through her company I’ll Have Another. Stuart Ford's AGC Studios also produced the film, with Ford, Greg Shapiro, Glendon Palmer, and Holly Shakoor Fleischer serving as executive producers. The screenplay was written by Leigh Davenport, creator of Run the World. On June 12, 2020, Numa Perrier was named as the director, and it was also announced that Netflix had picked up the film.

=== Casting ===
In December 2020, the casting of Keith Powers as Gabrielle Union's co-lead was announced. In March 2021, Niecy Nash was confirmed as a co-star, but in June 2021, it was revealed that Gina Torres had replaced Nash due to scheduling conflicts. La La Anthony, Janet Hubert, and Aisha Hinds were also announced as part of the cast in June 2021.

=== Filming ===
Filming for The Perfect Find was initially scheduled to begin in 2019. However, production plans were delayed, and filming ultimately began in June 2021 in Hudson County, New Jersey, with the shoot concluding in August. Filming officially started during the week of July 19, 2021, in Manhattan, New York. Additional filming locations included Newark and Jersey City, New Jersey.

== Release ==
The Perfect Find had its world premiere at the Tribeca Festival on June 14, 2023, and was released by Netflix on June 23, 2023.

== Reception ==
The Perfect Find received generally positive reviews from critics, with praise directed at the chemistry between Gabrielle Union and Keith Powers, and Union’s performance. On Rotten Tomatoes, the film holds an approval rating of 69% based on 29 critic reviews, with an average rating of 5.7/10. The site's critics consensus reads, "Gabrielle Union and Keith Powers bring palpable chemistry to The Perfect Find, delivering a low-key rom-com suitable for a comfy couch watch." On Metacritic, the film has a weighted average score of 57 out of 100, based on nine critics, indicating "mixed or average" reviews.

Critics generally appreciated the performances and the film's engaging style. The Guardian described Union as "the anchor of the breezy Netflix romcom" and noted that the film was a "fine romance to build a night in around." They praised Union's presence, although they also mentioned that the film followed predictable patterns. Similarly, Screen Rant called the film "vibrant" and highlighted its "homage to Old Hollywood" style, which brought a touch of elegance to the rom-com genre.

CNN also praised the film, calling it "the kind of low-key romance that often finds an appreciative audience on Netflix," while Decider noted that the film "brings an easy-going charm" and delivers a "classic rom-com formula," despite not offering anything groundbreaking.

However, some critics found the film formulaic. Mashable described The Perfect Find as "serviceable, with a few high points," and Variety remarked that it "gets style points for everything but the love story," indicating that while it excels in presentation, the romance lacked depth.

IndieWire highlighted Union’s performance, calling her “charming” but noting that the film struggles to offer fresh insights into the genre. The Hollywood Reporter agreed that Union "elevates" the material, but ultimately, the film’s predictability undercut its potential.

In addition to critical response, audience metrics indicate strong early engagement on Netflix. Weekly streaming data reported by Media Play News, based on measurements from research firm PlumResearch, showed that The Perfect Find generated approximately 3.8 million unique viewers during the week of June 26 to July 2, 2023.

== Accolades ==
| Award | Date of the ceremony | Category | Recipients | Result | Ref. |
|---|---|---|---|---|---|
| Tribeca Film Festival | 18 June 2023 | Audience Award for Narrative Feature | The Perfect Find | Won | |
| NAACP Image Awards | 16 March 2024 | Outstanding Actor in a Television Movie, Mini-Series or Dramatic Special | Keith Powers | Won | |
| NAACP Image Awards | 16 March 2024 | Outstanding Actress in a Television Movie, Mini-Series or Dramatic Special | Gabrielle Union | Nominated | |
| NAACP Image Awards | 16 March 2024 | Outstanding Directing in a Television Movie or Special | Numa Perrier | Nominated | |
