= Jezebel (2019 film) =

2019 drama film written and directed by Numa Perrier

- Theatrical release poster
- Directed by: Numa Perrier
- Written by: Numa Perrier
- Produced by: Livia Perrier; Numa Perrier; Winter Dunn
- Starring: Tiffany Tenille; Numa Perrier; Brett Gelman; Stephen Barrington; Bobby Field
- Cinematography: Brent Johnson
- Edited by: Brittany Lyles
- Music by: Dennis Dortch
- Production company: House of Numa
- Release date: March 9, 2019 (SXSW)
- Running time: 88 minutes
- Country: United States
- Language: English

Jezebel is a 2019 semi-autobiographical drama film written and directed by Numa Perrier and starring actress Tiffany Tenille. The plot follows a 19-year-old girl, also named Tiffany, who begins to prostitute herself as a cam girl to financially support herself. Jezebel premiered at SXSW on March 9, 2019, and was selected as a "Best of SXSW" film by The Hollywood Reporter.

== Plot ==
In 1998 Tiffany (Tiffany Tenille) and her family gather in Las Vegas at the home of her elder sister Sabrina (Numa Perrier) as they wait for their sickly mother to die. Sabrina lives out of a daily rental and supports her entire family including her older boyfriend, her younger brother Dominic, and her daughter Juju, through phone sex work.

After their mother dies, Sabrina's boyfriend begins to complain that Tiffany doesn't contribute financially to the household. Sabrina finds an ad for cam girls and urges Tiffany to apply, lending her a wig to use that Sabrina has nicknamed Jezebel.

Tiffany is immediately accepted as a cam girl and Vicky, who has been working for the company since its inception, shows her how to fake graphic acts for the camera. Sabrina is encouraging of the work and Tiffany quickly settles into the routine of performing sexual acts in front of a camera, using the stage name Jezebel.

After her mother's funeral Tiffany confides that her mother is dead to one of her customers, Bob. Tiffany and Bob develop a close relationship. Knowing that she is being monitored, Tiffany illicitly sends her phone number and her p.o. box address to Bob who begins sending her gifts.

At her boyfriend's behest Sabrina urges Tiffany to rent her own apartment. Tiffany is doing so well through her work that she is able to afford a weekly rental policy.

However things begin to get more complicated for Tiffany. A customer calls her by a racial slur and her white co-workers refuse to take the incident seriously. After monitoring Tiffany and seeing that she is ignoring Bob, despite the fact that that is part of his fetish, Tiffany is fired.

Because she is a top earner, two porn stars offer her a job working for them with a much higher base pay and a promise to ban any customer who racially abuses her. Bob also promises to send her cash. Tiffany returns to her former place of employment to collect her last check to find Vicky and her brother desperate to hire her back. Knowing she has the upper-hand, Tiffany is able to negotiate and is given everything she wants.

Later, at home, Sabrina prepares Tiffany for her first face to face meeting with Bob. Tiffany thanks Sabrina for all that she has done to help her become independent and cries as Sabrina comforts her.

== Cast ==
- Tiffany Tenille as Tiffany/Jezebel
- Numa Perrier as Sabrina
- Brett Gelman as Bobby
- Stephen Barrington as Dominic
- Bobby Field as David

== Production ==
Perrier adapted her own experiences doing work as a camgirl in the late 90s to write Jezebel. She developed the script through Tribeca Film Institute's Through Her Lens female director program.

The film was shot in 10 days using the same apartment building in Las Vegas where Perrier had lived. Perrier had a small budget, using money her sister loaned her and funds from a GoFundMe. She cast Tenille after seeing her in a short film. Perrier portrays Sabrina, who is modeled after Perrier's older sister.

== Release and reception ==
Jezebel premiered at SXSW on March 9, 2019. It sold out three shows and a fourth show was added to meet demand. Ava Duvernay's distribution company ARRAY acquired the film in January 2020 and released it on Netflix.

Critics received the film positively. The film has an 89% rating on Rotten Tomatoes. Soraya Nadia McDonald wrote for The Undefeated, "The most remarkable thing about Perrier’s vision of sex work is that it’s just that — work. It’s one of the few cases where the story of a black woman engaged in sex work is shown with a frank, matter-of-fact quality without shame, titillation or unchallenged acceptance of race fetishes." Kellee Terrell reviewed the film for NBCNews.com, saying, "It’s adorned with emotion, grit and heart, but most importantly, it’s rich in creating spaces for black women’s sexuality to develop, expand and awaken on-screen, a rarity in film." Frank Scheck wrote for THR, "It's tricky territory, but the filmmaker handles it with impressive skill. Much of the credit must also go to Tenille, who delivers a sexy, emotionally nuanced and compelling performance in the lead role."

== Accolades ==
- American Black Film Festival – Best Director
- American Black Film Festival – Best Feature Film
- BlackStar Film Festival – Best Narrative Feature, Nominee
- SXSW – Audience Award, Nominee

== See also ==
- Jezebel stereotype about African American women
