= Leigh Davenport =

American writer and producer

- Born: Chicago, Illinois, U.S.
- Occupations: Writer, producer
- Years active: 2019–present
- Notable work: Run the World

Leigh Davenport is an American writer and producer. She is the creator of the series Run the World, and the writer of the films Wendy Williams: The Movie and The Perfect Find.

== Life and career ==
Davenport was born and raised in Chicago. She received her bachelor's degree from Spelman College. She moved to Harlem after graduation, where she began her career in digital media and entertainment journalism. In 2017, she was working as editorial director for HelloBeautiful.com when she decided to pursue a screenwriting career. Davenport's first writing job was for the Boomerang television adaptation.

She eventually sold Run the World, a script she had worked on for a decade. The series, co-produced by Yvette Lee Bowser, follows a group of thirtysomething Black women living and working in Harlem. She loosely based the series on her own experiences living in New York for twelve years. The show has been compared to Sex and the City and Living Single for its focus on close female friendship. The first season received critical acclaim and was renewed by Starz in 2021.

Davenport wrote Wendy Williams: The Movie (2021) and the Netflix film The Perfect Find. She is the creator of the upcoming television adaptation of The World of Stephanie St. Clair: An Entrepreneur, Race Woman and Outlaw in the Early Twentieth Century Harlem by Shirley Stewart. The series is produced by Taraji P. Henson for BET Studios, who will also star.

Davenport is married. She has two children.

== Filmography ==
=== Television ===
| Year | Title | Writer | Producer | Notes |
|---|---|---|---|---|
| 2019 | Boomerang | Yes | No | Staff writer |
| 2021–2023 | Run the World | Yes | Yes | Creator |

=== Film ===
| Year | Title | Writer | Producer | Notes |
|---|---|---|---|---|
| 2021 | Wendy Williams: The Movie | Yes | No | |
| 2023 | The Perfect Find | Yes | Yes | |
