= Black Reel Award for Outstanding Guest Actress, Comedy Series =

Annual US television award

- Awarded for: Outstanding Guest Actress, Comedy Series
- Country: United States
- Presented by: Black Reel Awards for Television
- First award: 2017
- Currently held by: Erika Alexander, Run the World (2021)
- Website: blackreelawards.com

This article lists the winners and nominees for the Black Reel Award for Television for Outstanding Guest Actress, Comedy Series. The category was first introduced as Outstanding Guest Performer, Comedy Series, honoring both actors and actresses in guest starring roles on television. In 2018, the category was split into categories for each gender, resulting in the name change to its current title.

== Winners and nominees ==
Winners are listed first and highlighted in bold.

=== 2010s ===
Year	Performer	Series	Network	Ref
Outstanding Guest Performer, Comedy Series
2017
2017	**Dave Chappelle**	**Saturday Night Live**	**NBC**	
2017	Angela Bassett	Master of None	Netflix	
2017	Dwayne Johnson	Saturday Night Live	NBC	
2017	Mike Epps	Survivor's Remorse	Starz	
2017	Rashida Jones	black-ish	ABC	
Outstanding Guest Actress, Comedy Series
2018
2018	**Tiffany Haddish**	**Saturday Night Live**	**NBC**	
2018	Lena Waithe	Dear White People	Netflix	
2018	Regina Hall	Insecure	HBO	
2018	Rashida Jones	black-ish	ABC	
2018	Anna Deavere Smith	black-ish	ABC	
2019
2019	**Anna Deavere Smith**	**black-ish**	**ABC**	
2019	Regina King	The Big Bang Theory	CBS	
2019	Marla Gibbs	Rel	FOX	
2019	Rosie Perez	She's Gotta Have It	Netflix	
2019	Maya Rudolph	The Good Place	NBC	

=== 2020s ===
Year	Actor	Series	Network	Ref
2020
2020	**Maya Rudolph**	**The Good Place**	**NBC**	
2020	Angela Bassett	A Black Lady Sketch Show	HBO	
2020	Issa Rae	A Black Lady Sketch Show	HBO	
2020	Wanda Sykes	The Marvelous Mrs. Maisel	Amazon Prime Video	
2020	Yvette Nicole Brown	Dear White People	Netflix	
2021
2021	**Erika Alexander**	**Run the World**	**Starz**	
2021	Maya Rudolph	Saturday Night Live	NBC	
2021	Regina King	Saturday Night Live	NBC	
2021	Debbi Morgan	Bigger	BET+	
2021	Vanessa L. Williams	Girls5Eva	Peacock	
2022
2022	**Quinta Brunson**	**A Black Lady Sketch Show**	**HBO**	
2022	Lizzo	Saturday Night Live	NBC	
2022	Michelle Obama	Black-ish	ABC	
2022	Da'Vine Joy Randolph	Only Murders in the Building	Hulu	
2022	Adriyan Rae	Atlanta	FX	

== Superlatives ==
Superlative	Outstanding Guest Actress, Comedy Series
Actress with most awards	
Actress with most nominations	Maya Rudolph (3)
Actress with most nominations without ever winning	Angela Bassett; Rashida Jones; Regina King (2)

== Programs with multiple nominations ==
4 nominations

- black-ish

3 nominations

- Saturday Night Live

2 nominations

- A Black Lady Sketch Show
- Dear White People
- The Good Place

== Performers with multiple nominations ==
3 nominations

- Maya Rudolph

2 nominations

- Angela Bassett
- Rashida Jones
- Regina King
- Anna Deavere Smith

== Total awards by network ==
- NBC - 2
- ABC - 1
- Starz - 1
