= Black&Sexy TV =

American Mass Media Company

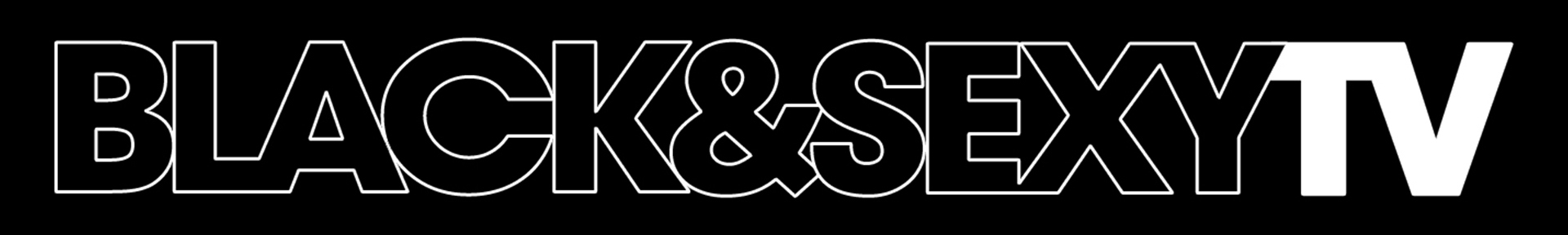

Black & Sexy TV is a digital media network founded by Dennis Dortch, Numa Perrier, Brian Ali Harding, and Jeanine Daniels. The network produces scripted content oriented to progressive Black American audiences. Notable programs include RoomieLoverFriends and Hello Cupid. In 2015, BET purchased the rights to broadcast three of Black & Sexy TV's original series on their cable channel. Black & Sexy TV moved to a monthly subscription model in 2015 using the platform VHX.

== History ==
Dennis Dortch and Brian Ali Harding produced a film called A Good Day to Be Black and Sexy in 2008, which was eventually purchased for distribution by Magnolia Pictures. The film had produced a cult following and Dortch wanted to transform the ethos of the film into a network. In 2011, together with Numa Perrier and Jeanine Daniels, they created the brand Black & Sexy TV and began posting content to YouTube. Their first show was The Number, a program about black sexuality and relationships. Their YouTube channel had garnered 11 million views as of May 2015. Shows that went viral on the network include The Couple (starring Numa Perrier and featuring Issa Rae), The Number, Hello Cupid (featuring Ashley Blaine Featherson and Hayley Marie Norman), and RoomieLoverFriends. Black & Sexy TV then began a pay-per-view model through YouTube for the season finales to assess viewers' levels of interest. They secured a development deal with HBO to turn The Couple into a series that Spike Lee signed on to executive produce.

In 2015, Black & Sexy TV signed a production deal with BET, who purchased the rights to broadcast Hello Cupid, RoomieLoverFriends and Sexless. That same year, Black & Sexy TV moved their digital content to a monthly paid streaming service model using the platform VHX.

In 2021, Black & Sexy TV made a deal with StarNews Mobile and mobile network operator group MTN to bring their shows to African viewers. Starting in Q1 2021, the content will be available to smartphone users in Nigeria. Subscribers will click on a link to stream episodes and will be billed weekly for access. MTN will zero-rate the data, which enables African customers to stream channels and episodes without eating into their data packages - making the service more accessible to African audiences. Dortch said his company will also experiment with new shorter formats that are more appropriate for African mobile customers.

== Content ==
- Roomieloverfriends
- Hello Cupid
- That Guy
- Becoming Nia
- That Guy
- Sexless
- The Couple
- Chef Julian
