= Dime Davis =

American director and producer

- Born: Dimonique Deshaun Davis; October 4, 1985 (age 40); Harris County, Texas
- Occupations: Director, producer
- Years active: 2015–present
- Notable work: Boomerang, A Black Lady Sketch Show
- Website: https://www.dimedavis.com/

Dimonique "Dime" Davis (born October 4, 1985) is an American director and producer. She directed several episodes of the BET series Boomerang, and was the co-showrunner of the second season. Davis was the director and executive producer of the debut season of HBO's A Black Lady Sketch Show, for which she received a 2020 Primetime Emmy nomination for Outstanding Directing for a Variety Series, the first Black woman to do so.

== Life and career ==
Davis was raised in Houston, Texas. She attended a performing arts high school and received her bachelor's degree from Chapman University in 2008. She attended the same high school and college as director Justin Simien and actress Elle Lorraine.

In 2015 she participated in AFI’s Directing Workshop for Women, during which she produced a short film, Sugar, starring Elle Lorraine. In 2018, she was hired as a writer and story editor for Lena Waithe's The Chi.

Davis was commissioned by LACMA to produce the short film Wild Wild West: A Beautiful Rant by Mark Bradford about artist Mark Bradford that debuted at 2018 Sundance. After Waithe saw the film, she invited Davis to work on Boomerang, which was still in production. Davis directed eight episodes and was co-showrunner for season 2.

In 2019, Davis directed the first season of HBO's A Black Lady Sketch Show, created by Robin Thede. She received a 2020 Primetime Emmy nomination Outstanding Directing for a Variety Series and was the first Black woman to receive a nomination.

She founded the production company Three's A Crowd with Elle Lorraine in 2020. Davis is developing an animated feature adaptation of her short film Sugar.

Davis has also worked on Abbott Elementary.
