= Andrea Bordeaux =

American actress and model

- Born: March 31, 1987 (age 37); Texas, U.S.
- Occupation(s): Actress, model
- Years active: 2007–present

Andrea Bordeaux (born March 31, 1987) is an American actress and model. She is best known for her role as Harley Hidoko in the TV series NCIS: Los Angeles.

== Life and career ==
Bordeaux grew up in Texas. She expressed an interest for acting since her childhood and had her first stage experience at the age of 14.

In 2005, she moved to New York City and studied at the theater of Pace University. One year later, she moved to the privately owned New York Conservatory for Dramatic Arts. In late 2006, Bordeaux was discovered as a model and gained further recognition. In 2010, she had her first role in the TV series Law & Order: Special Victims Unit.

In 2013 and 2014, she played Neda in the TNT series Rizzoli & Isles. Further guest appearances followed in series such as Criminal Minds. In 2017, she had her breakthrough in the ninth season of NCIS: Los Angeles, playing Harley Hidoko.

In 2021, she played the lead role of Ella McFair in Starz comedy Run the World. She was fired from the role during production of the second season for refusing to comply with the production's COVID-19 vaccine mandate.

== Filmography ==
=== Film ===
Year	Title	Role	Notes
2007	Drug Land	Corrine	Short
2008	It Wasn't for Love	Alicia	
2009	Pressure	Pamela	
2011	Angela's Glory	Angela	Short
2012	Hello I Must Be Going	Hostess	
2012	What Maisie Knew	Waitress	
2013	In Lieu of Flowers	Melissa	
2013	American Girl	Alexis	Short
2014	My Man Is a Loser	Jordan	
2015	First Date, Last Date	Sara	Short
2016	Hopeless, Romantic	Kelly	TV movie
2016	I Used to Be a Millionaire	Allysa	Short
2017	Can't Buy My Love	Megan	TV movie
2017	Afterburn/Aftershock	LaConnie	

=== Television ===
Year	Title	Role	Notes
2010	The Stay-At-Home Dad	Gym Hottie	TV series
2010	Law & Order: Special Victims Unit	Rebecca	Episode: "Rescue"
2011	How to Make It in America	Yosi's Assistant	Episode: "The Friction"
2012	Smash	Casting Assistant	Episode: "Hell on Earth"
2012	NYC 22	Dani	Episode: "Schooled"
2012	Made in Jersey	JaQuay	Episode: "Wingman"
2013	NCIS	Courtney	Episode: "Under the Radar"
2013–14	Rizzoli & Isles	Neda	Recurring cast: season 4
2014	Marry Me	Waitress	Episode: "Bruges Me"
2015	Criminal Minds	Kelly Goodwin	Episode: "'Til Death Do Us Part"
2015	Bones	Anna Lloyd	Episode: "The Promise in the Palace"
2017–18	NCIS: Los Angeles	Harley Hidoko	Recurring cast: Season 9
2019	Dynasty	Gloria Collins	Episode: "How Two-Faced Can You Get?"
2021	Run the World	Ella McFair	Main cast: season 1
