= Wendy Williams: The Movie =

American TV movie

- Promotional poster
- Genre: Biographical drama
- Teleplay by: Leigh Davenport; Scarlett Lacey
- Story by: Leigh Davenport
- Directed by: Darren Grant
- Starring: Ciera Payton; Morocco Omari; Liza Hugget; Rothaford Gray
- Music by: Kurt Farquhar
- Country of origin: United States
- Original language: English

Production
- Executive producers: Wendy Williams; Will Packer; Sheila Ducksworth
- Producer: Charles Cooper
- Cinematography: Adam Swilinski
- Editor: Dean Soltys
- Running time: 90 minutes
- Production companies: Front Street Pictures; Just Wendy; Will Packer Entertainment

Original release
- Network: Lifetime
- Release: January 30, 2021

Wendy Williams: The Movie is an American biographical drama television film directed by Darren Grant about the life of entertainer Wendy Williams. The film premiered on January 30, 2021, on Lifetime.

== Plot ==
Wendy Williams is a teenage girl growing up in New Jersey.

Cathy Hughes hires Williams to work in Washington, D.C., at the WOL radio station. Williams takes cocaine to suppress her appetite. She also gets a weekend job in New York City as an emcee. By 1990, she's working full-time in New York City. Hot 103.5 becomes Hot 97.

Williams remains addicted to cocaine during her marriage to Kevin Hunter. However, she finally quit cocaine.

== Cast ==
- Ciera Payton as Wendy Williams
- Morocco Omari as Kevin Hunter, Wendy's husband
- Liza Hugget as Shirley Williams, Wendy's mother
- Rothaford Gray as Thomas Williams Sr., Wendy's father
- Chelsea Brady as Wanda Williams, Wendy's older sister
- Trae Maridadi as Thomas Williams Jr., Wendy's younger brother
- Jamall Johnson as Eric B.
- Adrian Neblett as Charlamagne tha God
- Nykeem Provo as Ricky Tony, based on Sherrick
- Emy Aneke as DJ Red Alert
- Rebecca Davis as program director

== Reception ==
Jezebel.com both criticised and praised the movie.
