= Boomerang (American TV series) =

American comedy television series

- Genre: Comedy
- Based on: Boomerang by: Barry W. Blaustein; & David Sheffield
- Starring: Tequan Richmond; Tetona Jackson; Leland Martin; Lala Milan
- Country of origin: United States
- Original language: English
- No. of seasons: 2
- No. of episodes: 18

Production
- Executive producers: Lena Waithe; Ben Cory Jones; Lala Milan; Halle Berry; Rishi Rajani
- Running time: 30 minutes
- Production companies: 606 Television; DeEtte Productions (Season 1); Hillman Grad Productions; Paramount Television Studios

Original release
- Network: BET
- Release: February 12, 2019 – April 29, 2020

Boomerang is an American comedy television series, serving as a sequel to the 1992 film of the same name. The series premiered on February 12, 2019, on BET.

On April 2, 2019, it was announced that the series was renewed for a second season, which premiered on March 11, 2020. In August 2021, co-producer Lena Waithe announced that the series would not return for a third season.

== Premise ==
Boomerang revolves around "a successful executive who finds that his lifestyle choices have turned back on him when his new boss turns out to be a bigger deviant than he is. It is described as an updated version that explores contemporary workplace dynamics, including the changing role of gender, office politics, relationships and the conflicts between Generation X and millennials."

== Cast and characters ==
=== Main ===
- Tequan Richmond as Bryson, ambitious estranged son of Jacqueline Broyer (played by Robin Givens).
- Tetona Jackson as Simone Graham, daughter of Marcus and Angela Graham (played by Eddie Murphy and Halle Berry).
- Leland B. Martin as Ari, a bisexual aspiring director who struggles with his toxic behavior. Loosely inspired by Tyler (played by Martin Lawrence) in the original.
- Lala Milan as Tia Reid, a former stripper and performance artist. She later becomes a social media maven with the help of Simone. Loosely based on Strangé (played by Grace Jones).
- Brittany Inge as Crystal Garrett (recurring, season 1; main, season 2), a former ad employee and best friend of Simone. She is recently divorced from David. She struggles to find her voice in the friendship group.
- RJ Walker as David (recurring, season 1; main, season 2), an up-and-coming preacher who struggles to find his faith. He is recently divorced from Crystal.

=== Recurring ===
- Paula Newsome as Victoria Jackson (season 1).
- Kim Alex Hall as Rocky (season 1), Tia's girlfriend.

== Episodes ==
Season	Episodes	Originally released	
Season	Episodes	First released	Last released
1	10	February 12, 2019	April 9, 2019
2	8	March 11, 2020	April 29, 2020

=== Season 1 (2019) ===
No. overall	No. in season	Title	Directed by	Written by	Original release date	U.S. viewers (millions)
1	1	"Pilot"	Dime Davis	Lena Waithe & Ben Cory Jones	February 12, 2019	0.59
2	2	"Game Night"	Dime Davis	Jenny Lee	February 12, 2019	0.54
3	3	"Power"	David Warren	Lena Waithe & Ben Cory Jones	February 19, 2019	0.40
4	4	"Call A Spade"	Tiffany Johnson	Leigh Davenport	February 26, 2019	0.39
5	5	"The Let Out"	Sean Frank	Shawn Boxe	March 5, 2019	0.41
6	6	"Back in the Day"	A.V. Rockwell	Kendra Jo & Racquel Baker	March 12, 2019	0.32
7	7	"Family"	David Warren	Azia Squire	March 19, 2019	0.30
8	8	"Housekeeping"	Juel Taylor	Henry B. Chen & Jingyi Shao	March 26, 2019	0.29
9	9	"Us Too"	Dime Davis	Jenny Lee & Lena Waithe	April 2, 2019	0.35
10	10	"Trust"	Dime Davis	Ben Cory Jones & Lena Waithe	April 9, 2019	0.33

=== Season 2 (2020) ===
No. overall	No. in season	Title	Directed by	Written by	Original release date	U.S. viewers (millions)
11	1	"There U Go"	Dime Davis	Racquel Vice	March 11, 2020	0.39
12	2	"Love Shoulda Brought You Home"	Tiffany Johnson	Tearrance Arvelle Chisholm	March 18, 2020	0.44
13	3	"Don't Wanna Love You"	Katrelle N. Kindred	Kimiko Matsuda-Lawrence	March 25, 2020	0.47
14	4	"Reversal Of A Dog"	Dime Davis	LaDarian Smith	April 1, 2020	0.43
15	5	"7 Day Weekend"	Katrelle N. Kindred	Emilia Serrano	April 9, 2020	0.40
16	6	"Hot Sex"	Dime Davis	Angeli Millan	April 15, 2020	0.44
17	7	"Feels Like Heaven"	Tiffany Johnson	Daniel Willis	April 29, 2020	0.53
18	8	"End of the Road"	Dime Davis	Angeli Millan	April 29, 2020	0.41

== Production ==
=== Development ===
On April 11, 2018, it was announced that BET had given a series order to the production for a first season consisting of ten episodes. A writer and producing team had yet to be determined but the series was expected be produced by Paramount Television. On September 24, 2018, it was announced that Lena Waithe and Ben Cory Jones would write the series' pilot episode together and executive produce alongside Halle Berry and Rishi Rajani. Jones was also expected to serve as the showrunner for the series and Dime Davis was set to direct the pilot episode. Waithe's production company Hillman Grad Productions was also slated to be involved with the series. On December 19, 2018, it was announced that the series would premiere on February 12, 2019.

=== Casting ===
In October 2018, it was announced that Tequan Richmond, Tetona Jackson, Leland Martin, and Lala Milan had been cast in series regular roles and that RJ Walker, Paula Newsome, Brittany Inge, Joey BadA$$, and Kimberly Hall would appear in a recurring capacity.

=== Filming ===
Principal photography for the series took place from October to December 2018 in Georgia. In October 2018, filming took place in the Buckhead area of Atlanta and in East Point. In November 2018, the series was shooting in the Mechanicsville neighborhood of Atlanta and on Ponce de Leon Avenue near the Ponce City Market in Atlanta.

== Release ==
=== Marketing ===
On January 6, 2019, the first trailer for the series was released.

=== Premiere ===
On January 26, 2019, the series held a screening during the 2019 Sundance Film Festival. The event was followed by a panel discussion hosted by Macro Lodge and featuring executive producer Lena Waithe, showrunner Ben Cory Jones, and director Dime Davis.

== Reception ==
On Rotten Tomatoes season 1 has a score of 100% based on reviews from 12 critics.
