= Tia Williams =

American author

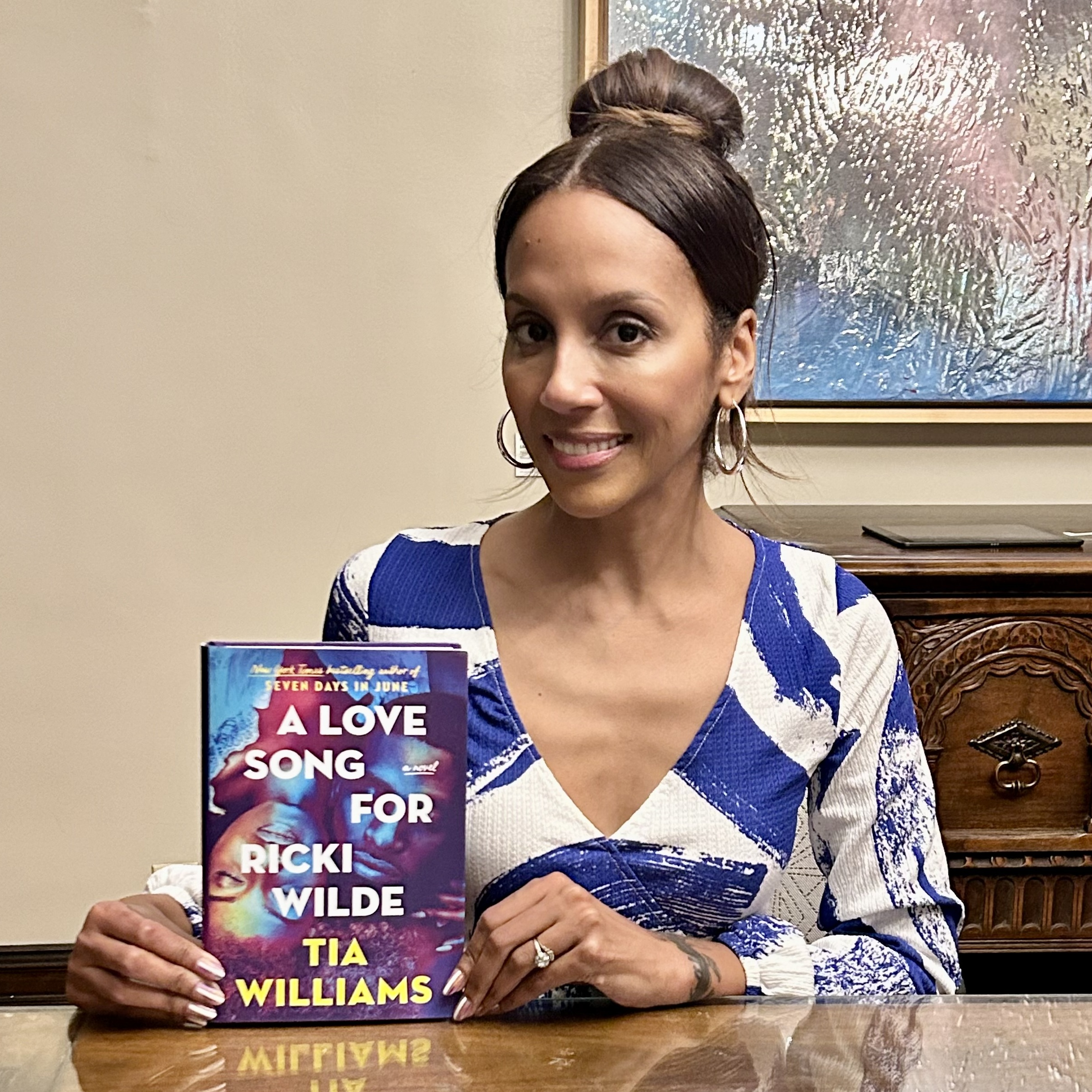
- Williams at Indiana Humanities in 2024
- Born: 1975 (age 50–51); Fairfax, Virginia
- Occupations: Editorial director and author
- Employer: Estée Lauder Companies
- Notable work: The Accidental Diva (2004); The Perfect Find (2016); Seven Days in June (2021)
- Awards: 2016 African American Literary Awards Best Fiction Prize for The Perfect Find
- Website: https://www.tiawilliams.net/

Tia Williams is an American novelist and editor. She has published six books and is best known for The Accidental Diva (2004), The Perfect Find (2016), and Seven Days in June (2021). She is also a long-time fashion editor and the current editorial director for the Estée Lauder Companies.

== Early life and education ==
Williams was raised in a suburban area of Virginia. She began writing during childhood and wrote her first book at age seven. She named The Westing Game as one book that shaped her interest in a writing career. Williams received her bachelor's degree from University of Virginia in 1997. She moved to Brooklyn shortly after graduation and has lived there since.

== Career ==
Williams' professional writing career began in 2004, when she founded the fashion blog Shake Your Beauty. She also worked as an editor at publications including Essence, Glamour, Teen People, and Elle. Williams worked as the head copywriter at Bumble and bumble for five years. Since 2020, she has been the editorial director of the Estée Lauder Companies.

Williams published her first novel The Accidental Diva in 2004 during a resurgence of chick lit published by and about Black women. It received a positive review from Publishers Weekly, where her writing was praised: "Williams's gift for sexy if sometimes purple prose...save this energetic romance from being just another uptown girl meets downtown boy tale and signals the arrival of a sharp new talent."

In 2006, she co-authored the book The Beauty of Color with Iman. She also wrote two young adult novels, It Chicks and It Chicks: Sixteen Candles.

Williams released The Perfect Find in 2016 under Hachette, about a woman who takes a job as a fashion editor and falls in love with her frenemy manager's son. The book was adapted into a film produced by Netflix and Gabrielle Union, who also stars. It was released in 2023 on Netflix.

In 2021, she released Seven Days in June, a novel about two writers who reunite after 15 years for a week-long affair. The protagonist lives with chronic migraines, a condition that Williams also has. After its publication it was named to the New York Times Best Seller list and was also selected for Reese Witherspoon's book club. Tembe Denton-Hurst of New York reviewed the book positively: "It's been a while since I read a book I was delighted by — a book that made me smile wide for no reason because of how touching or cute it is." BookPage writer Jessica Wakeman gave it a starred review. Seven Days in June is in development to be adapted into a television series produced by Will Packer Media with Williams as executive producer.

A Love Song For Ricki Wilde was released in February 2024, by Grand Central Publishing; the book was an instant USA Today Bestseller.

== Personal life ==
Williams married her husband in 2021. She has two children.

== Works ==
- — (2004). The Accidental Diva. Peanut Press/Palm Reader. ISBN 978-0-451-21507-9.
- Iman; Williams, Tia (September 2006). The Beauty of Color: The Ultimate Beauty Guide for Skin of Color. Grand Central Publishing. ISBN 9780399532849.
- — (2007). The It Chicks. Hyperion/Jump At the Sun. ISBN 978-1-4231-0406-3.
- — (2008). Sixteen Candles (an It Chicks novel). Hyperion/Jump At the Sun. ISBN 9780534372149.
- — (2016). The Perfect Find. Brown Girl Books. ISBN 9781944359119.
- — (2021). Seven Days in June. Grand Central Publishing. ISBN 978-1-5387-1910-7.
- — (2024). A Love Song For Ricki Wilde. Grand Central Publishing. ISBN 9781538726709.
- — (2025). Audre & Bash Are Just Friends. Little,Brown Books for Young Readers. ISBN 9780316480697.
- — (2026). The Missed Connection. Grand Central Publishing. ISBN 9781538770269.

== Accolades ==
- 2016 – Independent Publisher Award for Multicultural Fiction, Bronze (for The Perfect Find)
- 2016 – African American Literary Award for Best Fiction (for The Perfect Find)
- 2021 – New York Public Library Best Books for Adults 2021 – Seven Days in June
