= Yvette Lee Bowser =

American television producer (born 1965)

- Born: Yvette Denise Lee; June 9, 1965 (age 61); Philadelphia, Pennsylvania, U.S.
- Education: Stanford University (BA)
- Occupations: Television producer, screenwriter
- Years active: 1987–present
- Known for: A Different World; Living Single; For Your Love; Half & Half; Black-ish; Dear White People; Run the World
- Spouse: Kyle Bowser (m. 1994)
- Children: 2

Yvette Denise Lee Bowser (née Lee; born June 9, 1965) is an American television writer and producer best known for creating the Fox sitcom Living Single. With Living Single, she became the first African-American woman to develop her own primetime series.

== Early life and education ==
Yvette Denise Lee was born in Philadelphia in 1965. Her father was black and her mother was white. She was an only child. Bowser grew up in Los Angeles. Her parents divorced when she was ten and afterwards she was raised by her mother and her Asian stepfather. She attended Santa Monica High School and was homecoming queen. She was classmates there with Holly Robinson Peete and Lori Petty, who would later act in main roles for Bowser's produced shows. Bowser attended Stanford University, majoring in political science and psychology. At Stanford, Bowser pledged the Alpha Kappa Alpha sorority. Bowser graduated in 1987.

== Career ==
Bowser was introduced to Bill Cosby who put her on his show, A Different World, as an unpaid apprentice writer in 1987. By 1992 she was a producer for the show. She wrote 25 episodes over five years. She produced a season of the television show Hangin' with Mr. Cooper, but she found the experience isolating as the only Black woman writer.

Queen Latifah and Kim Coles asked Bowser to work on a TV project developed by Warner Bros. That project became Living Single, an ensemble comedy about four single Black women professionals navigating friendship, work, and love in New York City. Bowser was creator and lead producer for the series, which ran from 1993 to 1999 and was ranked No. 1 among Black and Latino households by Nielsen. Living Single was named one of Variety’s “100 Greatest TV Shows of All Time” in 2023. Bowser said that much of the series' storylines came from her or her friends' personal experience.

Bowser was executive producer and co-creator of Lush Life (1996), becoming the first African-American woman to have two network sitcoms (with Living Single) running at the same time. Lush Life was canceled in its first season. Bowser next created and ran For Your Love, a comedy featuring a Black and a White couple navigating marriage. For Your Love ran from 1998 to 2002.

Bowser was executive producer of the show Half & Half, about half-sisters building a relationship in adulthood. It ran from 2002 to 2006.

Bowser consulted on Black-ish.

Bowser was showrunner for Dear White People, a Netflix 2017 comedy-drama created by Justin Simien. It had four seasons and ran until 2022. In 2020, she was the showrunner for the first season of the Starz original series Run the World, created by Leigh Davenport. Bowser was the showrunner for Unprisoned, a Hulu series that ran for two season from 2023 to 2024.

== Style ==
Bowser said in an interview that she draws many of her characters and plots from her own and her friends' personal experiences. She has said, "I just basically rip pages out of my diary to tell stories on TV." In the case of Half & Half, for example, the writer based the characters Mona and Dee-Dee on herself and an older half-sister, and plot ideas came from her experience as the youngest child in a blended family. The New York Times wrote that Bowser has "a gift for depicting female friendships on television."

== Personal life ==
Yvette Denise Lee married producer Kyle Bowser in 1994. The two have worked together on Yvette's shows. They have two children, Evan and Drew.

Bowser volunteered for Barack Obama's 2008 presidential campaign.

== Filmography ==
Year	Title	Role	Notes
1991–1992	A Different World	Producer, Program Consultant	25 episodes
1993	Hangin' with Mr. Cooper	Producer	17 episodes
1993	The Wayans Bros.	Executive Consultant	17 episodes
1993–1998	Living Single	Creator, Executive Producer	105 episodes
1996	Lush Life	Creator, Executive Producer	7 episodes
1998–2002	For Your Love	Creator, Executive Producer	84 episodes
2002–2006	Half & Half	Executive Producer	91 episodes
2008–2009	Lipstick Jungle	Consulting Producer	11 episodes
2012	The Exes	Consulting Producer	12 episodes
2012–2013	Happily Divorced	Consulting Producer	12 episodes
2014–2016	Black-ish	Consulting Producer	3 episodes
2017–2019	Dear White People	Executive Producer	30 episodes
2021	Run the World	Executive Producer	8 episodes
