= Living Single =

American television sitcom (1993–1998)

- Genre: Sitcom
- Created by: Yvette Denise Lee
- Starring: Queen Latifah; Kim Coles; Erika Alexander; Kim Fields; T.C. Carson; John Henton; Mel Jackson
- Theme music composer: Queen Latifah
- Opening theme: "We Are Living Single" by Queen Latifah
- Composers: John Barnes; Jamey Jaz; Stu Gardner; Bill Maxwell (season 5)
- Country of origin: United States
- Original language: English
- No. of seasons: 5
- No. of episodes: 118 (list of episodes)

Production
- Executive producers: Yvette Lee Bowser; Tom Anderson; Roger S.H. Schulman; Bill Fuller; Jim Pond
- Producers: Roxie Wenk Evans; Patricia Rickey
- Production locations: Warner Bros. Studios, Burbank, California
- Camera setup: Videotape; Multi-camera
- Running time: 22 minutes
- Production companies: Sister Lee Productions (1994–1998) (seasons 2–5); Warner Bros. Television

Original release
- Network: Fox
- Release: August 22, 1993 – January 1, 1998

Related
- Half & Half; The Crew

Living Single is an American television sitcom created by Yvette Denise Lee, which aired on Fox from August 22, 1993, to January 1, 1998, lasting five seasons. The show centers on the lives of six New York City friends who share personal and professional experiences while living in a Brooklyn brownstone. It has been listed as one of the greatest television series of all time.

== Episodes ==
Season	Episodes	Originally released		Rank	Viewers (millions)
Season	Episodes	First released	Last released	Rank	Viewers (millions)
1	27	August 22, 1993	May 15, 1994	#56	16.53
2	27	September 1, 1994	May 18, 1995	#84	13.79
3	27	August 31, 1995	May 9, 1996	#111	9.99
4	24	August 29, 1996	May 8, 1997	#104	9.35
5	13	September 11, 1997	January 1, 1998	#117	7.08

=== Plot ===
Living Single centers on six friends in their 20s who live in Prospect Heights, Brooklyn.

The series focuses on two different households in one brownstone, one shared by a trio of independent women and another shared by two men who have been friends since childhood while living in Cleveland, Ohio. In the first apartment, Khadijah James (Queen Latifah), a hard-working editor and publisher of the fictional urban independent magazine Flavor, lives with her sweet but naive cousin Synclaire James (Kim Coles)—an aspiring actress who works as Khadijah's receptionist and has an affinity for Troll dolls—and Khadjia's childhood friend from East Orange, New Jersey, Regina "Régine" Hunter (Kim Fields)—an image-conscious boutique buyer on a constant search for a well-to-do man with whom to spend her life, and his money.

Later in the series, Régine becomes a costume assistant for the soap opera Palo Alto. When the soap is canceled, she becomes a wedding planner and leaves the apartment to move in with her fiancé, Dexter Knight (Don Franklin). Maxine "Max" Shaw (Erika Alexander), a sharp-tongued Attorney and Khadijah's best friend from their college days at Howard University, frequently stops by to share her unique insights and the events of her day, to make sure that the girls' refrigerator isn't overstocked, and to start trouble with Kyle, looking for any chance to make his life worse.

Kyle Barker (T.C. Carson) lives in the second apartment with Overton Wakefield Jones (John Henton). Overton is the friendly but bucolic maintenance man for the owner of their building and the one next door. He holds a deep affection for Synclaire and plenty of hilarious homespun wisdom for everyone else. Kyle is a stockbroker whose constant verbal sparring with Maxine does little to mask their obvious sexual attraction to each other. Kyle and Maxine pursue a sexual relationship, but when he decides to take a job in London and invites her to join him, she turns him down.

Maxine subsequently becomes distraught over her decision and, after legally defending a man who claimed to be the second coming of Jesus (Harold Perrineau), she begins to take her life more seriously. Through a series of events, Maxine decides that her purpose is to become a mother. She pursues pregnancy via IVF, and unknowingly selects Kyle's sperm donation based on a list of qualities she would like for her child. Kyle returns in the series finale, and the two reconcile.

Overton and Synclaire also get together, and their relationship culminates in marriage by the end of the fourth season. In season five, they move in together, leaving Overton and Kyle's apartment open for new character Roni DeSantos (Idalis DeLeon), a New York-area D.J. It is eventually revealed that DeSantos had a fling with Ira Lee "Tripp" Williams III, (Mel Jackson), a songwriter whom Khadijah and Régine allowed to move in when Synclaire's room became available. Synclaire joins a comedy improv troupe where she gains the attention of Tony Jonas, a Warner Bros. Television executive, who casts her as a nun for a new comedy series he is developing.

Along with trying to make Flavor a success, Khadijah also looks for Mr. Right. She eventually finds him in childhood friend Scooter (Cress Williams), with whom she leaves the brownstone one last time in the series finale.

== Cast and characters ==
=== Regular cast ===
- Queen Latifah – Khadijah James, Howard graduate and editor and publisher of Flavor, an independent magazine devoted to the interests of the African-American community.
- Kim Coles – Synclaire James-Jones, Khadijah's good-natured cousin and roommate; receptionist at Flavor and aspiring actress. The role of Synclaire was originally intended for Queen Latifah's long-time friend and collaborator, Monie Love, but she was unable to take the part.
- Kim Fields – Regina "Regine" Hunter (episodes 1–115), Khadijah and Synclaire's gossip-loving roommate; Khadijah's childhood friend.
- Erika Alexander – Maxine "Max" Felice Shaw, strong-willed attorney, Khadijah's best friend and former college roommate at Howard, who grew up in Mount Airy, Philadelphia; spends most of her time at the women's apartment.
- T.C. Carson – Kyle Barker (episodes 1–107; guest appearance in episode 118), stockbroker and Overton's roommate; Max's verbal sparring partner and on-again-off-again love interest.
- John Henton – Overton "Obie" Wakefield Jones, Kyle's roommate and the brownstone's handyman; Synclaire's sweetheart, also co-owner of the apartment complex the gang lived in.
- Mel Jackson – Ira Lee "Tripp" Williams III (Season 5), Khadijah and Regine's new roommate; aspiring songwriter.

=== Recurring cast ===
- Chip Fields — Laverne Hunter, Regine's mother
- Rita Owens — Rita James (Seasons 1–4), Khadijah's mother
- Michael Warren — Ed James (Season 4), Khadijah's father
- Barbara Montgomery – Nana James (Season 2), Khadijah's grandmother
- Khalil Kain — Keith (Seasons 3–4), Regine's boyfriend and artist
- Don Franklin — Dexter Knight (Season 5), Regine's boyfriend turned fiancé
- Cress Williams — Terrence "Scooter" Williams, Khadijah's childhood friend and boyfriend
- Isaiah Washington — Dr. Charles Roberts (Season 4), Khadijah's anesthesiologist and boyfriend
- Heavy D - Darryl, Regine's boyfriend (3 episodes)
- Wayne Federman – Fred Meyer, Maxine's law office colleague (Season 2, Ep. 10 & 19; Season 3, Ep. 11)
- Shaun Baker — Russell Montego, Jamaican-born music editor at Flavor, in love with Regine.
- Bumper Robinson — Ivan Ennis (Seasons 3–4), Flavor copy aide and journalism major at New York University, in love with Khadijah.
- Idalis DeLeon — Roni DeSantos (Season 5), popular New York City deejay and Tripp's love interest

=== Guest cast ===
- Cylk Cozart – Brad Hamilton, Regine's boyfriend (Season 1, Episode 1)
- Freda Payne – Miss Harper (Season 1, Episode 2)
- Thomas Mikal Ford – Michael Edwards, Synclaire's date (Season 1, Episode 3)
- Jeffrey D. Sams – Greg, Maxine's ex-boyfriend (Season 1, Episode 4)
- Kellita Smith - Susan, Greg's fiancée (Season 1, Episode 4)
- Miguel A. Nunez – Goldie (Season 1, Episode 6 & 20)
- Montrose Hagins – Shirley Shortridge (Season 1, Episode 7)
- Marcus Giamatti – Jack Peabody (Season 1, Episode 7)
- Dominic Hoffman – Patrick (Season 1, Episode 8)
- Isabel Sanford – Mrs. Ryan (Season 1, Episode 10)
- Ed McMahon – as himself (Season 1, Episode 12)
- Flip Wilson - as himself (Season 1, Episode 12)
- Dres (rapper) – as himself (Season 1, Episode 12)
- Nia Long – Stacey Evans (Season 1, Episode 13)
- Terrence Howard – Brendan King (Season 1, Episode 17)
- Cree Summer – Summer (Season 1, Episode 18)
- Morris Chestnut – Hamilton Brown, the new upstairs neighbor (Season 1, Episode 18 & 19)
- Michael Jai White – Steve (Season 1, Episode 20)
- Charnele Brown – Jackie (Season 1, Episode 21)
- Arsenio Hall – as himself (Season 1, Episode 21)
- Mark Curry – Tony Ross, Regine's boyfriend, a standup comedian (Season 1, Episode 25)
- Adam Lazarre-White - Alonzo Ford (Season 1, Episode 24 and 27)
- Cheryl Miller – Denise Hatcher, Khadijah's school basketball rival (Season 2, Episode 2)
- Branford Marsalis – as himself (Season 2, Episode 2)
- Tamlyn Tomita – Mary, business client of Flavor (Season 2, Episode 5)
- Franklin Cover – Professor Fletcher, Synclaire's teacher (Season 2, Episode 6)
- Michole Briana White — Olivia Imogen Jones (Season 2 Episode 7 & Season 4 Episode 24), Overton's sister
- Gilbert Gottfried – Lawrence J. Friedlander, telemarketing company owner (Season 2, Episode 10)
- Diana Bellamy – Judge Glazer, the judge at Maxine's trial (Season 2, Episode 10)
- Elayne Boosler – Dr. Sheridan, Regine's doctor (Season 2, Episode 11)
- John Capodice – neighborhood ice cream man (Season 2, Episode 11)
- Deion Sanders – as himself (Season 2, Episode 12)
- Rosie O'Donnell – Sheri, Khadijah's high school friend (Season 2, Episode 14)
- Bobby Bonilla – as himself (Season 2, Episode 16)
- Shemar Moore – Jon Marc, Synclaire's study partner (Season 2, Episode 18)
- Phil Morris – Preston August, Maxine's boss and former boyfriend (Season 2, Episode 19)
- Phil LaMarr – Joe, friend of Regine's boyfriend (Season 2, Episode 19)
- Vanessa A. Williams – Hellura, Kyle's date (Season 2, Episode 22)
- Kadeem Hardison – Marcus Hughes, Village Voice reporter (Season 2, Episode 23)
- Roberto Durán – as himself (Season 2, Episode 23)
- Jenifer Lewis – Delia Deveaux, talk show host (Season 2, Episode 25)
- Will Ferrell – talk show guest (Season 2, Episode 25)
- Bill Erwin – Mr. Foster, store owner (Season 2, Episode 26)
- Regina King – Zina, possible new roommate (Season 2, Episode 26)
- CCH Pounder – Nina Shaw (Season 3), Maxine's mother
- Gladys Knight — Odelle Jones (Season 4), Overton's mother
- Antonio Fargas — Otis Jones (Season 4), Overton's father
- Denise Nicholas — Lilah James (Season 4), Synclaire's mother
- Ron O'Neal — Clinton James (Season 4), Synclaire's father
- Kenny Blank - as Damon Barker (Season 4), Kyle's brother
- Grant Hill – as himself (Season 3, Episode 3)
- John O'Hurley – as Jean Luc Gerard, Regine new boss (Season 3, Episode 5)
- Eartha Kitt – as Jacqueline Richards, Kyle's client (Season 3, Episode 8)
- Alonzo Mourning – as himself (Season 3, Episode 10)
- CCH Pounder – Nina Shaw, Maxine's mother (Season 3, Episode 11)
- Burt Ward – as himself (Season 3, Episode 11)
- Dean Cain – as himself (Season 3, Episode 11)
- Cris Carter – as himself (Season 3, Episode 12)
- Michael Boatman – as Brent, Palo Alto actor (Season 3, Episode 13)
- Dorian Gregory – as Mountie Robeson (Season 3, Episode 13)
- Melvin Van Peebles – Warner Devant, Regine's date (Season 3, Episode 16)
- Mario Van Peebles – Cole Front, Regine's date (Season 3, Episode 16)
- Brian McKnight – as himself (Season 3, Episode 17)
- Jasmine Guy – Dr. Jessica Bryce, Khadijah's therapist (Season 3, Episode 19)
- Darryl M. Bell - John, Regine's boyfriend (Season 3, Episode 20)
- Karen Malina White - Shayla, Maxine's former roommate (Season 3, Episode 22)
- Dorien Wilson — Rev. Leslie Taylor, pastor at the group's church (Season 3, Episode 23; Season 4, Episodes 6, 16 & 24)
- Monica – Marissa, Khadijah's date's sister (Season 3, Episode 24)
- Giancarlo Esposito – Maxine's client (Season 3, Episode 24)
- Tatyana Ali – Stephanie James, Khadijah's half-sister (Season 3, Episode 25)
- Jack Carter – Ray Kellum, eccentric man (Season 3, Episode 26; Season 4, Episode 9)
- Bobcat Goldthwait – mugger (Season 3, Episode 27; Season 4, Episode 1)
- Tone Loc – as Lester Tate, picked on Kyle in high school (Season 4, Episode 8)
- Vivica A. Fox – as Darryl's fiancée (Season 4, Episode 9)
- Jeff Blake – as himself (Season 4, Episode 10)
- Sullivan Walker – as Dr. Booker Burghardt Mountebank (Season 4, Episode 12)
- Evander Holyfield – as himself (Season 4, Episode 15)
- Kareem Abdul-Jabbar – as himself (Season 4, Episode 15)
- Susan L. Taylor – as herself (Season 4, Episode 15)
- Estelle Harris – as Esther Brooks, owner of the brownstone (Season 4, Episode 15)
- CeCe Winans – as LaTrice, in the choir of the group's church (Season 4, Episode 16)
- Sherri Shepherd – comedienne (Season 4, Episode 17)
- Joseph Marcell — Reese, the women's house cleaner (Season 4, Episode 19)
- Jim Brown – as himself (Season 4, Episode 20)
- Tracy Vilar – as Ava Rivera (Season 4, Episode 22)
- Desmond Howard – as himself (Season 4, Episode 24)
- Marsha Warfield – Agnes Finch, cruise social director (Season 5, Episodes 1 and 2)
- Montell Jordan – as himself (Season 5, Episode 2)
- Cedric Ceballos – as himself (Season 5, Episode 3)
- Chaka Khan – as herself (Season 5, Episode 6)
- Keyshawn Johnson – as himself (Season 5, Episode 7)
- Tionne 'T-Boz' Watkins – hitchhiker (Season 5, Episode 8)
- Harold Perrineau – Walter Jackson, Maxine's client (Season 5, Episode 9)
- Joyce DeWitt – as herself (Season 5, Episode 12)

== Home media ==
Warner Home Video released the complete first season of Living Single on DVD in Region 1 on February 14, 2006. The remainder seasons were released from 2017-18.

DVD name	Episodes	Region 1
The Complete First Season	27	February 14, 2006
The Complete Second Season	27	September 19, 2017
The Complete Third Season	27	November 21, 2017
The Complete Fourth Season	24	March 20, 2018
The Complete Fifth Season	13	June 5, 2018

== Production ==
Queen Latifah and Kim Coles both had development deals with Fox. In March 1993, Fox announced that Queen Latifah and Coles would star in a comedy sitcom called My Girls, about roommates in New York City. The character of Khadijah was created for Queen Latifah. Khadijah is an entrepreneur who started an urban-lifestyle magazine, much as Latifah is an entrepreneur who started her hip-hop record label. Fox changed the show's name to Living Single three weeks before its television debut.

Creator Yvette Lee Bowser's initial goal was to develop a show about herself and her friends that would change the portrayal of young Black people on television. Her overall goal was to portray Black characters positively and less stereotypically. She also noted that the women represented on Living Single are four different sides of herself, saying in an interview, "I've been as ditsy as Synclaire, as superficial as Regine, as bitter as Max, and as focused and driven as Khadijah."

In May 1997, Fox announced that it had ordered 13 episodes of the fifth season of Living Single but would be delayed until January 1998. Three months later, Fox made a change to its fall schedule, delayed the airing of a new comedy called Rewind, and decided to debut Living Single's fifth season on September 11. The final episode of the fifth season aired on January 1, 1998.

== Crossovers ==
- The Crew: In the episode "The Mating Season", Regine becomes a passenger on a flight and argues with a sassy stewardess in hopes of upgrading to first class. In another episode, "The Worst Noel," Synclaire also becomes a passenger.
- Half & Half: Erika Alexander and T.C. Carson reprised their roles of Maxine Shaw and Kyle Barker on the UPN sitcom, Half & Half (a series produced by Living Single creator Yvette Lee Bowser). In the episode ("The Big Performance Anxiety Episode," third season), ambitious law student Dee Dee learns that her mother's co-star, Kyle, in a play is engaged to Maxine, Dee Dee's idol. However, her mother gets Maxine's beau fired because she fears he will take attention away from her. The episode also revealed that Maxine and Kyle remained a couple and were the proud parents of their seven-year-old daughter named Kyla.

== Syndication ==
Living Single started reruns in syndication on September 22, 1997, through various Fox, UPN, and WB affiliates; these were later CW affiliates in terms of UPN and WB. The series formerly reran on USA Network, Logo TV, BET, VH1, MTV2, Bounce TV, and Oxygen. Syndication carriage on the local level fizzled out in 2006. Reruns of the series currently run daily on cable networks TV One, Dabl, and WCIU. As of January 11, 2018, all episodes began streaming on Hulu, and on HBO Max as of September 22, 2022.

== Reunion specials ==
An hour-long retrospective special, Living Single: The Reunion Show, aired on TV One on September 22, 2008. Coles, Henton, Fields, Carson and Alexander reunited to share fond memories with the fans. Queen Latifah and Mel Jackson were unavailable to participate. The special featured clips and revealing secrets of the cast from the show's five-year run.

From August 24 to 26, 2018, TV One aired a weekend marathon of "Living Single" to highlight the 25th anniversary of the show. Coles, Henton, Fields, and Carson reunited once again to share memories with the fans, to share their thoughts on the characters they portrayed and provided a tribute to Rita Owens (Queen Latifah's real-life and TV mother), who had passed in early 2018. Queen Latifah, Erika Alexander and Mel Jackson were unavailable to participate.

== Reception ==
During Living Single's first season, it consistently garnered higher ratings than Martin, which aired in the time slot immediately before it on Thursday nights, and it quickly became the fourth highest-rated show aired on Fox among their 12 current series.

Throughout its run, Living Single became one of the most popular African-American sitcoms of its era, ranking amongst the top five in African-American ratings in all five seasons. Newspaper critics contrasted Living Single with the NBC sitcom Friends which was inspired by the post-college experiences of Marta Kauffman and David Crane and in development around November 1993 after the show premiered. Show creator Yvette Lee Bowser was disappointed that Warner Bros. Television did not promote Living Single nearly as much as it did Friends.

Living Single was never one of the highest-rated programs among audiences during its run from 1993 to 1998. Indeed, the show had struggled to break into lists of top television programs viewed by larger audiences and never broke into the Top 50, though it was a higher performer for the Fox network itself. Those who loved and watched the show regularly have told show creator Yvette Lee Bowser that they connect with its characters, love the cast, and are inspired by the positive, elegant, and professional portrayal of Black people on television. Bowser noted that "People say our characters remind them of themselves, their friends or their relatives. They all know someone like one of the characters."

=== Awards and nominations ===
Awards and nominations for Living Single
Year	Awards	Category	Performer	Result
1998	Image Awards	Outstanding Actress in a Comedy Series	Erika Alexander	Won
1998	Image Awards	Outstanding Comedy Series		Won
1998	Image Awards	Outstanding Actress in a Comedy Series	Queen Latifah	Nominated
1998	Image Awards	Outstanding Lead Actress in a Comedy Series	Kim Coles	Won
1998	Image Awards	Outstanding Supporting Actor in a Comedy Series	T.C. Carson	Nominated
1998	Image Awards	Outstanding Supporting Actor in a Comedy Series	John Henton	Nominated

In 1995 and 1996, Living Single was nominated for Primetime Emmy Awards for Outstanding Lighting Direction (Electronic) for a Comedy Series (Bryan Hays).
