= Ludwig Göransson discography =

Ludwig Göransson is a Swedish composer, film and television scorer, record producer, multi-instrumentalist, and songwriter based in Los Angeles, California. He is best known for his work with American rapper Childish Gambino and film directors Ryan Coogler and Christopher Nolan.

== Albums ==
- How to Find a Party (2012)

== Songwriting and production credits ==
Title	Year	Artist(s)	Album	Credits	Written with	Produced with
"Difference"	2010	Childish Gambino	Culdesac	Producer	–	Childish Gambino
"Hero"	2010	Childish Gambino	Culdesac	Producer	–	Childish Gambino
"I Be on That"	2010	Childish Gambino	Culdesac	Producer	–	Childish Gambino
"Got This Money"	2010	Childish Gambino	Culdesac	Producer	–	Childish Gambino
"So Fly"	2010	Childish Gambino	Culdesac	Producer	–	Childish Gambino
"You Know Me"	2010	Childish Gambino	Culdesac	Producer	–	Childish Gambino
"Let Me Dope You"	2010	Childish Gambino	Culdesac	Producer	–	Childish Gambino
"Do Ya Like"	2010	Childish Gambino	Culdesac	Producer	–	Childish Gambino
"I'm Alright"	2010	Childish Gambino	Culdesac	Producer	–	Childish Gambino
"Glory"	2010	Childish Gambino	Culdesac	Producer	–	Childish Gambino
"Fuck It All"	2010	Childish Gambino	Culdesac	Producer	–	Childish Gambino
"I'm On It"	2010	Childish Gambino	Culdesac	Producer	–	Childish Gambino
"Put It In My Video"	2010	Childish Gambino	Culdesac	Producer	–	Childish Gambino
"These Girls" (featuring Garfunkel and Oates)	2010	Childish Gambino	Culdesac	Producer	–	Childish Gambino
"The Last"	2010	Childish Gambino	Culdesac	Producer	–	Childish Gambino
"Be Alone"	2011	Childish Gambino	EP	Co-writer/Producer	Donald Glover	Childish Gambino
"Freaks and Geeks"	2011	Childish Gambino	EP	Co-writer/Producer	Donald Glover	Childish Gambino
"My Shine"	2011	Childish Gambino	EP	Co-writer/Producer	Donald Glover	Childish Gambino
"Lights Turned On"	2011	Childish Gambino	EP	Co-writer/Producer	Donald Glover	Childish Gambino
"Not Going Back" (featuring Beldina Malaika)	2011	Childish Gambino	EP	Co-writer/Producer	Donald Glover, Beldina Malaika	Childish Gambino
"Bonfire"	2011	Childish Gambino	Camp	Co-writer/Producer	Donald Glover	Childish Gambino
"Heartbeat"	2011	Childish Gambino	Camp	Co-writer/Producer	Donald Glover	Childish Gambino
"Outside"	2011	Childish Gambino	Camp	Co-writer/Producer	Donald Glover	Childish Gambino
"Fire Fly"	2011	Childish Gambino	Camp	Co-writer/Producer	Donald Glover	Childish Gambino
"All the Shine"	2011	Childish Gambino	Camp	Co-writer/Producer	Donald Glover	Childish Gambino
"Letter Home"	2011	Childish Gambino	Camp	Co-writer/Producer	Donald Glover	Childish Gambino
"Backpackers"	2011	Childish Gambino	Camp	Co-writer/Producer	Donald Glover	Childish Gambino
"L.E.S."	2011	Childish Gambino	Camp	Co-writer/Producer	Donald Glover	Childish Gambino
"Hold You Down"	2011	Childish Gambino	Camp	Co-writer/Producer	Donald Glover	Childish Gambino
"Kids (Keep Up)"	2011	Childish Gambino	Camp	Co-writer/Producer	Donald Glover	Childish Gambino
"You See Me"	2011	Childish Gambino	Camp	Co-writer/Producer	Donald Glover	Childish Gambino
"Sunrise"	2011	Childish Gambino	Camp	Co-writer/Producer	Donald Glover	Childish Gambino
"That Power"	2011	Childish Gambino	Camp	Co-writer/Producer	Donald Glover	Childish Gambino
"Longest Text Message"	2011	Childish Gambino	Camp	Co-writer/Producer	Donald Glover	Childish Gambino
"We Ain't Them"	2012	Childish Gambino	Royalty	Co-writer/Producer	Donald Glover	Childish Gambino
"Arrangement" (featuring Gonage)	2012	Childish Gambino	Royalty	Co-writer	Donald Glover	–
"Won't Stop" (featuring Danielle Haim)	2012	Childish Gambino	Royalty	Co-writer/Producer	Donald Glover, Danielle Haim	Childish Gambino
"Blue Eyes Blind"	2012	ZZ Ward	Til the Casket Drops	Co-writer/Producer	Zsuzsanna Ward	–
"Forever"	2012	Haim	Days Are Gone	Producer	–	Ariel Rechtshaid
"One In a Million"	2013	Down with Webster	Party For Your Life	Co-writer/Producer	Tyler Armes, Cameron Hunter, Jensen Vaughan, Andrew Martino, Patrick Gilett, Martin Seja	–
"Interlude (That's Love)"	2013	Chance the Rapper	Acid Rap	Producer	–	–
"Better Off"	2013	Haim	Days Are Gone	Producer	–	–
"II: Worldstar"	2013	Childish Gambino	Because the Internet	Co-writer/Producer	Donald Glover	Childish Gambino
"I: The Worst Guys" (featuring Chance the Rapper)	2013	Childish Gambino	Because the Internet	Co-writer/Producer	Donald Glover, Chancelor Bennett	Childish Gambino
"II: Shadows"	2013	Childish Gambino	Because the Internet	Co-writer/Producer	Donald Glover, Stephen Bruner, K. Muhammad	Thundercat, Childish Gambino
"III: Telegraph Ave. ("Oakland" by Lloyd)"	2013	Childish Gambino	Because the Internet	Co-writer/Producer	Donald Glover, Rochelle Jordan	Childish Gambino
"IV: Sweatpants"	2013	Childish Gambino	Because the Internet	Co-writer/Producer	Donald Glover, Jason Martin	Childish Gambino
"V: 3005"	2013	Childish Gambino	Because the Internet	Co-writer/Producer	Donald Glover, Stefan Ponce	Childish Gambino, Stefan Ponce
"Playing Around Before The Party Starts"	2013	Childish Gambino	Because the Internet	Co-writer/Producer	Donald Glover	–
"I: The Party"	2013	Childish Gambino	Because the Internet	Co-writer/Producer	Donald Glover, Jonathan Levi	Childish Gambino, Pop Levi
"II: No Exit"	2013	Childish Gambino	Because the Internet	Co-writer/Producer	Donald Glover, Miguel Pimental	Childish Gambino
"I: Flight of The Navigator"	2013	Childish Gambino	Because the Internet	Co-writer/Producer	Donald Glover	Childish Gambino
"II: Zealots of Stockholm (Free Information)"	2013	Childish Gambino	Because the Internet	Co-writer/Producer	Donald Glover, Lakisha Robinson	Childish Gambino, Sam Spiegel
"III: Urn"	2013	Childish Gambino	Because the Internet	Co-writer/Producer	Donald Glover	Childish Gambino
"I: Pink Toes" (featuring Jhené Aiko)	2013	Childish Gambino	Because the Internet	Co-writer/Producer	Donald Glover, Stefan Ponce, Jhene Chilombo	Childish Gambino
"II: Earth: The Oldest Computer (The Last Night)" (featuring Azealia Banks)	2013	Childish Gambino	Because the Internet	Co-writer/Producer	Donald Glover, Azealia Banks	Childish Gambino
"III: Life: The Biggest Troll (Andrew Auernheimer)"	2013	Childish Gambino	Because the Internet	Co-writer/Producer	Donald Glover	Childish Gambino
"Somebody to Miss You"	2014	T. Mills	All I Wanna Do (EP)	Co-writer/Producer	Travis Mills, Matthew Samuels, William Lobban-Bean, Matt Morris, James Fauntleroy	Boi-1da, Cook Classics
"Dollar Store"	2014	Pell	Floating While Dreaming	Producer	–	–
"Fresh Produce"	2014	Pell	Floating While Dreaming	Producer	–	–
"U Don't Have To Call"	2014	Childish Gambino	STN MTN	Producer	–	The Neptunes
"Sober"	2014	Childish Gambino	Kauai	Co-writer/Producer	Donald Glover	Childish Gambino
"Pop Thieves (Make It Feel Good)" (featuring Jaden Smith)	2014	Childish Gambino	Kauai	Co-writer/Producer	Donald Glover	Childish Gambino
"Retro (Rough)"	2014	Childish Gambino	Kauai	Co-writer/Producer	Donald Glover	Childish Gambino
"Late Night in Kauai" (featuring Jaden Smith)	2014	Childish Gambino	Kauai	Co-writer/Producer	Donald Glover	Childish Gambino
"V: 3005 (Beach Picnic Version)"	2014	Childish Gambino	Kauai	Co-writer/Producer	Donald Glover, Stefan Ponce	Childish Gambino
"Together" (featuring Childish Gambino)	2015	Selah Sue	Reason	Co-writer/Producer	Sanne Putseys, Evan Kidd Bogart, Donald Glover	–
"Alive"	2015	Selah Sue	Reason	Producer	Sanne Putseys, Birsen Uçar, Robin Hannibal, Michael Asante	Robin Hannibal
"Daddy"	2015	Selah Sue	Reason	Producer	Sanne Putseys, Joachim Saerens, Yannick Werther, Birsen Uçar, Robin Hannibal, Jordi Geuens, Erik Rademakers	–
"Right Where I Want You"	2015	Selah Sue	Reason	Producer	Sanne Putseys, Pieterjan Seaux, Birsen Uçar	Robin Hannibal
"Always Home"	2015	Selah Sue	Reason	Producer	Sanne Putseys, Mocky, Yannick Werther, Birsen Uçar, Erik Rademakers	Robin Hannibal
"Falling Out"	2015	Selah Sue	Reason	Producer	Sanne Putseys, Joachim Saerens, Birsen Uçar	–
"Gotta Make it Last"	2015	Selah Sue	Reason	Producer	Sanne Putseys, Joachim Saerens, Yannick Werther, Birsen Uçar, Robin Hannibal, Jordi Geuens, Erik Rademakers	–
"Me and Your Mama"	2016	Childish Gambino	"Awaken, My Love!"	Co-writer/Producer	Donald Glover, Zac Rae	Childish Gambino
"Redbone"	2016	Childish Gambino	"Awaken, My Love!"	Producer	–	Childish Gambino
"Have Some Love"	2016	Childish Gambino	"Awaken, My Love!"	Additional Producer	–	Childish Gambino
"Boogieman"	2016	Childish Gambino	"Awaken, My Love!"	Co-writer/Producer	Donald Glover	Childish Gambino
"Zombies"	2016	Childish Gambino	"Awaken, My Love!"	Co-writer/Producer	Donald Glover, Ray Suen, Chris Hartz	Childish Gambino
"Riot"	2016	Childish Gambino	"Awaken, My Love!"	Co-writer/Additional Producer	Donald Glover, George Clinton, Hazel Cook, Haskins Eugene	Childish Gambino
"California"	2016	Childish Gambino	"Awaken, My Love!"	Co-writer/Producer	Donald Glover	Childish Gambino
"Terrified"	2016	Childish Gambino	"Awaken, My Love!"	Co-writer/Producer	Donald Glover	Childish Gambino
"Baby Boy"	2016	Childish Gambino	"Awaken, My Love!"	Co-writer/Producer	Donald Glover	Childish Gambino
"The Night Me and Your Mama Met"	2016	Childish Gambino	"Awaken, My Love!"	Co-writer/Producer	Donald Glover, Gary Clark	Childish Gambino, Gary Clark
"Stand Tall"	2016	Childish Gambino	"Awaken, My Love!"	Co-writer/Producer	Donald Glover	Childish Gambino
"Self-Help Tape"	2017	Moses Sumney	Aromanticism	Co-writer/Producer	Moses Sumney	Moses Sumney
"Opps" (with Yugen Blakrok)	2018	Vince Staples	Black Panther: OST	Co-writer/Producer	Kendrick Duckworth, Mark Spears, Vince Staples	Sounwave
"This Is America"	2018	Childish Gambino	Non-album single	Co-writer/Producer	Donald Glover	Childish Gambino
"Summertime Magic"	2018	Childish Gambino	Summer Pack	Co-writer/Producer	Donald Glover	Childish Gambino
"Feels Like Summer"	2018	Childish Gambino	Summer Pack	Co-writer/Producer	Donald Glover	Childish Gambino
"My Mistake"	2019	Vampire Weekend	Father of the Bride	Co-writer	Ezra Koenig	Ariel Rechtshaid, Ezra Koenig, DJ Dahi, Buddy Ross
"Time"	2020	Childish Gambino	3.15.20	Co-writer/Producer	Donald Glover, Dacoury Natche, Ariana Grande, Chukwudi Hodge, Sarah Aarons	Childish Gambino, DJ Dahi, Chukwudi Hodge
"19.10"	2020	Childish Gambino	3.15.20	Co-writer/Producer	Donald Glover, Dacoury Natche, Chukwudi Hodge, Kurtis McKenzie, James Francies	Childish Gambino, DJ Dahi, Chukwudi Hodge, Kurtis McKenzie
"32.22"	2020	Childish Gambino	3.15.20	Co-writer/Producer	Donald Glover, Dacoury Natche, Chukwudi Hodge, Kurtis McKenzie, James Francies	Childish Gambino, DJ Dahi, Chukwudi Hodge, Kurtis McKenzie
"42.26"	2020	Childish Gambino	3.15.20	Co-writer/Producer	Donald Glover	Childish Gambino
"47.48"	2020	Childish Gambino	3.15.20	Co-writer/Producer	Donald Glover, Dacoury Natche, Chukwudi Hodge, Legend Glover	Childish Gambino, DJ Dahi, Chukwudi Hodge
"So Done" (featuring Khalid)	2020	Alicia Keys	Alicia	Co-writer/Producer	Alicia Cook, Khalid Robinson	–
"The Plan"	2020	Travis Scott	Tenet	Producer	Jacques Webster II, Ebony Naomi Oshunrinde	WondaGurl
"BRON"	2020	Lykke Li	Non-album single	Co-writer/Producer	Josefin Jinder, Lykke Li Timotej Zachrisson	Lykke Li
"Strangers by Nature"	2021	Adele	30	Co-writer/Producer	Adele Adkins	–
"Wild Wild West"	2021	Adele	30	Co-writer/Producer	Adele Adkins	–
"A Body, A Coffin"	2022	Amaarae	Black Panther: Wakanda Forever Prologue	Co-writer/Additional Producer	Jephte "Kyu" Steed Baloki, Joel Mason "Maesu" Tanner, Kwame "KZ" Kwei-Armah Jr.	Kyu Steed, Kwame "KZ" Kwei-Armah Jr., Ayodeji "Cracker Mallo" Olowu
"Soy"	2022	Santa Fe Klan	Black Panther: Wakanda Forever Prologue	Co-writer/Producer	Ángel Jair Quezada Jasso	–
"Lift Me Up"	2022	Rihanna	Black Panther: Wakanda Forever (soundtrack)	Co-writer/Producer	Robyn Fenty, Ryan Coogler, Temilade Openiyi	–
"La Vida"	2022	E-40, Snow Tha Product	Black Panther: Wakanda Forever (soundtrack)	Co-writer/Producer	Claudia Meza, Earl Stevens, Gilberto Gutierrez, Gisela Reina, Iván Felipe Fernández, Juan Francisco Galván, Octavia Vega	–
"Interlude"	2022	Stormzy	Black Panther: Wakanda Forever (soundtrack)	Co-writer/Producer	Michael Evenezer Kwadjo Omari Owuo Jr.	–
"Árboles Bajo El Mar"	2022	Vivir Quintana, Mare Advertencia Lirika	Black Panther: Wakanda Forever (soundtrack)	Co-writer/Producer	Alejandro Néstor Méndez Rojas, Marlene Ramirez Cruz, Viviana Montserrat Quintana Rodríguez	–
"Pantera"	2022	Alemán, Rema	Black Panther: Wakanda Forever (soundtrack)	Co-writer/Producer	Divine Ikubor, Erick Raúl Alemán Ramírez	–
"Inframundo"	2022	Blue Rojo	Black Panther: Wakanda Forever (soundtrack)	Co-writer/Producer	Santiago Ogarrio	–
"Laayli' kuxa'ano'one"	2022	Adn Maya Colectivo, All Mayan Wink, Pat Boy, Yaalen K'uj	Black Panther: Wakanda Forever (soundtrack)	Co-writer/Producer	Antonio de Jesus Chan Guerra, Jesus Cristobal Pat Chable, Roy Elisur Gongora Magaña	–
"No Digas Mi Nombre"	2022	Calle x Vida, Foudeqush	Black Panther: Wakanda Forever (soundtrack)	Co-writer/Producer	Angela Paola Maldonado Flores, Cristian Jesus Bautista Espinoza, Donovan Pérez, Josué Fernandez, Mario Aguilar Millan	–
"Con La Brisa"	2022	Foudeqush, Ludwig Göransson	Black Panther: Wakanda Forever (soundtrack)	Performer/Co-writer/Producer	Angela Paola Maldonado Flores	–
"No Woman No Cry"	2022	Tems	Black Panther: Wakanda Forever (soundtrack)	Producer	–	–
"Mi Pueblo"	2022	Guadalupe de Jesús Chan Poot	Black Panther: Wakanda Forever (soundtrack)	Producer	–	–
"Coming Back For You"	2022	Fireboy DML	Black Panther: Wakanda Forever (soundtrack)	Co-writer/Additional Producer	Adedamola Adefolahan, Peace Oredope	P.Priime
"Alone"	2022	Burna Boy	Black Panther: Wakanda Forever (soundtrack)	Co-writer/Additional Producer	Austin "Tay" Iwar, Damini Ebunoluwa Ogulu, Peace Oredope	P.Priime, Tay Iwar
"They Want It, But No"	2022	Tobe Nwigwe, Fat Nwigwe	Black Panther: Wakanda Forever (soundtrack)	Co-writer/Additional Producer	Tobe Nwigwe	Ngawang Samphel
"Born Again"	2022	Rihanna	Black Panther: Wakanda Forever (soundtrack)	Co-writer/Additional Producer	James Fauntleroy, Rihanna, Terius "The-Dream" Gesteelde-Diamant	Terius "The-Dream" Gesteelde-Diamant
"Anya Mmiri"	2022	CKay, PinkPantheress	Black Panther: Wakanda Forever (soundtrack)	Co-writer/Additional Producer	Le Mav, Peace Oredope, PinkPantheress	P.Priime, Le Mav
"Wake Up"	2022	Bloody Civilian, Rema	Black Panther: Wakanda Forever (soundtrack)	Additional Producer	–	Bloody Civilian
"Atavista"	2024	Childish Gambino	Atavista	Co-writer	Donald Glover	–
"Time"	2024	Childish Gambino	Atavista	Co-writer/Producer	Donald Glover, Dacoury Natche, Ariana Grande, Chukwudi Hodge, Sarah Aarons	Childish Gambino, DJ Dahi, Chukwudi Hodge
"To Be Hunted"	2024	Childish Gambino	Atavista	Co-writer/Producer	Donald Glover, Dacoury Natche, Chukwudi Hodge, Kurtis McKenzie, James Francies	Childish Gambino, DJ Dahi, Chukwudi Hodge, Kurtis McKenzie
"Why Go To The Party"	2024	Childish Gambino	Atavista	Co-writer/Producer	Donald Glover, Dacoury Natche, Chukwudi Hodge, Kurtis McKenzie, James Francies	Childish Gambino, DJ Dahi, Chukwudi Hodge, Kurtis McKenzie
"Human Sacrifice"	2024	Childish Gambino	Atavista	Producer	–	DJ Dahi
"The Violence"	2024	Childish Gambino	Atavista	Co-writer/Producer	Donald Glover, Dacoury Natche, Chukwudi Hodge, Legend Glover	Childish Gambino, DJ Dahi, Chukwudi Hodge
"Hearts Were Meant to Fly"	2024	Childish Gambino	Bando Stone & The New World	Additional Producer	–	Childish Gambino, Brittney Orinda, Kurtis McKenzie
"Lithonia"	2024	Childish Gambino	Bando Stone & The New World	Co-writer/Producer	Donald Glover, Max Martin, Michael Uzowuru, Riley Mackin	Childish Gambino, Max Martin, Michael Uzowuru
"Survive"	2024	Childish Gambino	Bando Stone & The New World	Co-writer/Co-producer	Donald Glover, Stephen Glover, Dacoury Natche, Michael Uzowuru	Childish Gambino, Dacoury Natche, Michael Uzowuru
"No Excuses"	2024	Childish Gambino	Bando Stone & The New World	Co-writer/Producer	Donald Glover, Michael Ozowuru	Childish Gambino, Michael Uzowuru
"Crusin'"	2024	Childish Gambino	Bando Stone & The New World	Co-writer/Producer	Donald Glover, Dacoury Natche, Noah Smith, Michael Uzowuru	Childish Gambino, DJ Dahi, Caroline Whitaker, Michael Uzowuru, Tyler Johnson
"A Place Where Love Goes"	2024	Childish Gambino	Bando Stone & The New World	Co-writer/Producer	Donald Glover, Oscar Holter, Max Martin, Dacoury Notche	Childish Gambino, Max Martin, DJ Dahi, Oscar Holter, Riley Mackin

== Filmography ==
=== Films ===
Year	Title	Director(s)	Studio(s)	Notes
2008	Marley & Me	David Frankel	20th Century Fox; Fox 2000 Pictures; Regency Enterprises; Sunswept Entertainment; Dune Entertainment	Composer of additional music Score composed by Theodore Shapiro
2009	Year One	Harold Ramis	Columbia Pictures; The Apatow Company; Ocean Pictures	Composer of additional music Score composed by Theodore Shapiro
2009	Jennifer's Body	Karyn Kusama	20th Century Fox; Fox Atomic; Dune Entertainment	Composer of additional music Score composed by Theodore Shapiro
2011	30 Minutes or Less	Ruben Fleischer	Columbia Pictures; Media Rights Capital; Red Hour Films	
2013	Fruitvale Station	Ryan Coogler	The Weinstein Company; Significant Productions	Nominated - Black Reel Award for Outstanding Score
2013	We're the Millers	Rawson Marshall Thurber	Warner Bros. Pictures; New Line Cinema; Newman/Tooley Films; Slap Happy Productions; Heyday Films; Benderspink	Composed with Theodore Shapiro
2014	Stretch	Joe Carnahan	Universal Pictures; Blumhouse Productions; IM Global	
2014	The Town That Dreaded Sundown	Alfonso Gomez-Rejon	Orion Pictures; Blumhouse Productions; Ryan Murphy Productions	
2014	A Merry Friggin' Christmas	Tristram Shapeero	Phase 4 Films; Entertainment One Films; Sycamore Pictures	
2014	Top Five	Chris Rock	Paramount Pictures; IAC Films; Scott Rudin Productions; Jax Media	
2015	Creed	Ryan Coogler	Warner Bros. Pictures; Metro-Goldwyn-Mayer; New Line Cinema; Chartoff-Winkler Productions	Rocky themes by Bill Conti; Seattle Film Critics Society Award for Best Music, Original Song; Nominated - Black Reel Award for Outstanding Original Song; Nominated - Black Reel Award for Outstanding Score; Nominated - Boston Society of Film Critics Award for Best Use of Music in a Film; Nominated - IFMCA Award for Best Original Score for a Drama Film
2016	Central Intelligence	Rawson Marshall Thurber	Warner Bros. Pictures (United States); Universal Pictures (International); New Line Cinema; RatPac-Dune Entertainment; Perfect World Pictures; Bluegrass Films; Principato-Young Entertainment	Composed with Theodore Shapiro
2016	True Memoirs of an International Assassin	Jeff Wadlow	Netflix; PalmStar Media; Global Film Group; Broken Road Productions	
2016	Inner Workings	Leo Matsuda	Walt Disney Pictures; Walt Disney Animation Studios	Short film
2017	Everything, Everything	Stella Meghie	Warner Bros. Pictures; Metro-Goldwyn-Mayer; Alloy Entertainment	
2017	Hasan Minhaj: Homecoming King	Christopher Storer	Netflix; Art & Industry	
2018	Black Panther	Ryan Coogler	Marvel Studios	Grammy Award for Best Score Soundtrack for Visual Media; Academy Award for Best Original Score; Nominated - Black Reel Award for Outstanding Score; Nominated - Georgia Film Critics Association Award for Best Original Score; Nominated - Golden Globe Award for Best Original Score; Nominated - Houston Film Critics Society Award for Best Original Score; Nominated - Saturn Award for Best Music; Nominated - San Francisco Film Critics Circle Award for Best Original Score; Nominated - Washington D.C. Area Film Critics Association Award for Best Score
2018	Death Wish	Eli Roth	Metro-Goldwyn-Mayer (United States); Annapurna Pictures (International); Cave 76 Productions	
2018	Slice	Austin Vesely	A24; Frëhand; N2ition Cinema	Composed with Nathan Matthew David
2018	Venom	Ruben Fleischer	Columbia Pictures; Marvel Entertainment; Tencent Pictures; Arad Productions; Matt Tolmach Productions; Pascal Pictures	
2018	Creed II	Steven Caple Jr.	United Artists Releasing (United States); Warner Bros. Pictures (International); Metro-Goldwyn-Mayer; New Line Cinema; Chartoff-Winkler Productions	Rocky themes by Bill Conti; Nominated - Black Reel Award for Outstanding Score
2020	Trolls World Tour	Walt Dohrn	Universal Pictures; DreamWorks Animation	Executive Music Producer with Justin Timberlake; Score composed by Theodore Shapiro
2020	Tenet	Christopher Nolan	Warner Bros. Pictures; Syncopy Inc.	Nominated - Chicago Film Critics Association Award for Best Original Score; Runner-up - Florida Film Critics Circle Award for Best Score; Nominated - Golden Globe Award for Best Original Score; Nominated - Satellite Award for Best Original Score; Nominated - Saturn Award for Best Music
2021	Bad Trip	Kitao Sakurai	Netflix; Orion Pictures; Gorilla Flicks; The District	Composed with Joseph Shirley
2022	Turning Red	Domee Shi	Walt Disney Pictures; Pixar Animation Studios	Göransson's first score for an animated film Nominated - Annie Award for Outstanding Achievement for Music in a Feature Production Nominated - Hollywood Music in Media Award for Best Original Score in an Animated Film
2022	Black Panther: Wakanda Forever	Ryan Coogler	Marvel Studios	Black Reel Award for Outstanding Original Song Hollywood Music in Media Award for Best Original Song in a Feature Film Nominated - Academy Award for Best Original Song Nominated BET Her Award Nominated - Black Reel Award for Outstanding Original Song Nominated - Black Reel Award for Outstanding Original Score Nominated - Critics' Choice Movie Award for Best Song Nominated - Golden Globe Award for Best Original Song Nominated - Grammy Award for Best Compilation Soundtrack for Visual Media Nominated - Grammy Award for Best Score Soundtrack for Visual Media Grammy Award for Best Song Written for Visual Media Nominated - Guild of Music Supervisors Award for Best Song Written and/or Recording Created for a Film Nominated - Hollywood Music in Media Award for Best Original Score in a Sci-Fi/Fantasy Film Nominated - Satellite Award for Best Original Song
2022	Zen - Grogu and Dust Bunnies	Katsuya Kondō	Lucasfilm; Studio Ghibli	Short film
2023	Oppenheimer	Christopher Nolan	Universal Pictures; Syncopy Inc. Atlas Entertainment	Academy Award for Best Original Score; BAFTA Award for Best Original Music; Critics' Choice Movie Award for Best Score; Golden Globe Award for Best Original Score; Grammy Award for Best Score Soundtrack for Visual Media; Online Film Critics Society Award for Best Original Score; Washington D.C. Area Film Critics Association Award for Best Score; Nominated - Chicago Film Critics Association; Runner-up - Dallas–Fort Worth Film Critics Association Award for Best Musical Score; Nominated - Grammy Award for Best Arrangement, Instrumental or A Cappella; Nominated - Grammy Award for Best Instrumental Composition; Nominated - Hollywood Music in Media Awards; Nominated - Houston Film Critics Society Award for Best Original Score; Nominated - Satellite Award for Best Original Score
2025	Sinners	Ryan Coogler	Warner Bros. Pictures; Proximity Media	Also Executive Producer Academy Award for Best Original Score Black Reel Award for Outstanding Original Score BAFTA Award for Best Original Music Critics' Choice Movie Award for Best Score Dallas-Fort Worth Film Critics Association Award for best musical score Golden Globe Award for Best Original Score Hollywood Music in Media Award for Best Original Score in a Feature Film Satellite Award for Best Original Score Grammy Award for Best Score Soundtrack for Visual Media Washington D.C. Area Film Critics Association Award for Best Score Nominated - Chicago Film Critics Association Award for Best Original Score Nominated - Grammy Award for Best Instrumental Composition Nominated - Grammy Award for Best Song Written for Visual Media x2 Nominated - Saturn Award for Best Music
2026	The Mandalorian and Grogu	Jon Favreau	Lucasfilm	
2026	The Odyssey	Christopher Nolan	Universal Pictures; Syncopy Inc.	

=== Television ===
Year	Title	Showrunner(s)	Studio(s)	Network(s)	Notes
2009–2015	Community	Dan Harmon	Universal Television (Note: Credited as Open 4 Business Productions in copyright); Sony Pictures Television; Krasnoff/Foster Entertainment; Russo Brothers Films (season 1–3); Harmonious Claptrap (Note: Credited as Dan Harmon Productions (seasons 1–3)); Yahoo! Studios (season 6)	NBC (seasons 1–5); Yahoo! Screen (season 6)	
2011–2013	Happy Endings	David Caspe	ABC Studios; Sony Pictures Television; FanFare Productions; Shark vs. Bear Productions	ABC	
2011–2018	New Girl	Elizabeth Meriwether	Chernin Entertainment; 20th Century Fox Television; Meriwether Productions (episodes 1–3); Elizabeth Meriwether Pictures (episodes 4–146); American Nitwits	Fox	
2014–2015	Satisfaction	Sean Jablonski	Sony Pictures Television; Universal Cable Productions; Krasnoff/Foster Entertainment; Rhythm Arts Entertainment	USA Network	Composed with Nathan Matthew David
2016–2018	Angie Tribeca	Steve Carell; Nancy Carell	Carousel Television; 301 Productions; TBS Productions (seasons 1–2); Studio T (seasons 3–4)	TBS	Composed with Nathan Matthew David
2018–2020	Patriot Act with Hasan Minhaj	Richard A. Preuss	Art & Industry; Margolis Superstore; Minhaj Inc	Netflix	
2019–2020	The Mandalorian	Jon Favreau	Lucasfilm; Fairview Entertainment; Golem Creations	Disney+	
2021–2022	The Book of Boba Fett	Jon Favreau	Lucasfilm; Golem Creations	Disney+	Composed with Joseph Shirley
2023	Ahsoka	Dave Filoni	Lucasfilm; Golem Creations	Disney+	Co-wrote the song "Igyah Kah" with Kevin Kiner, Deana Kiner and Noah Gorelick.
