= Childish Gambino discography =

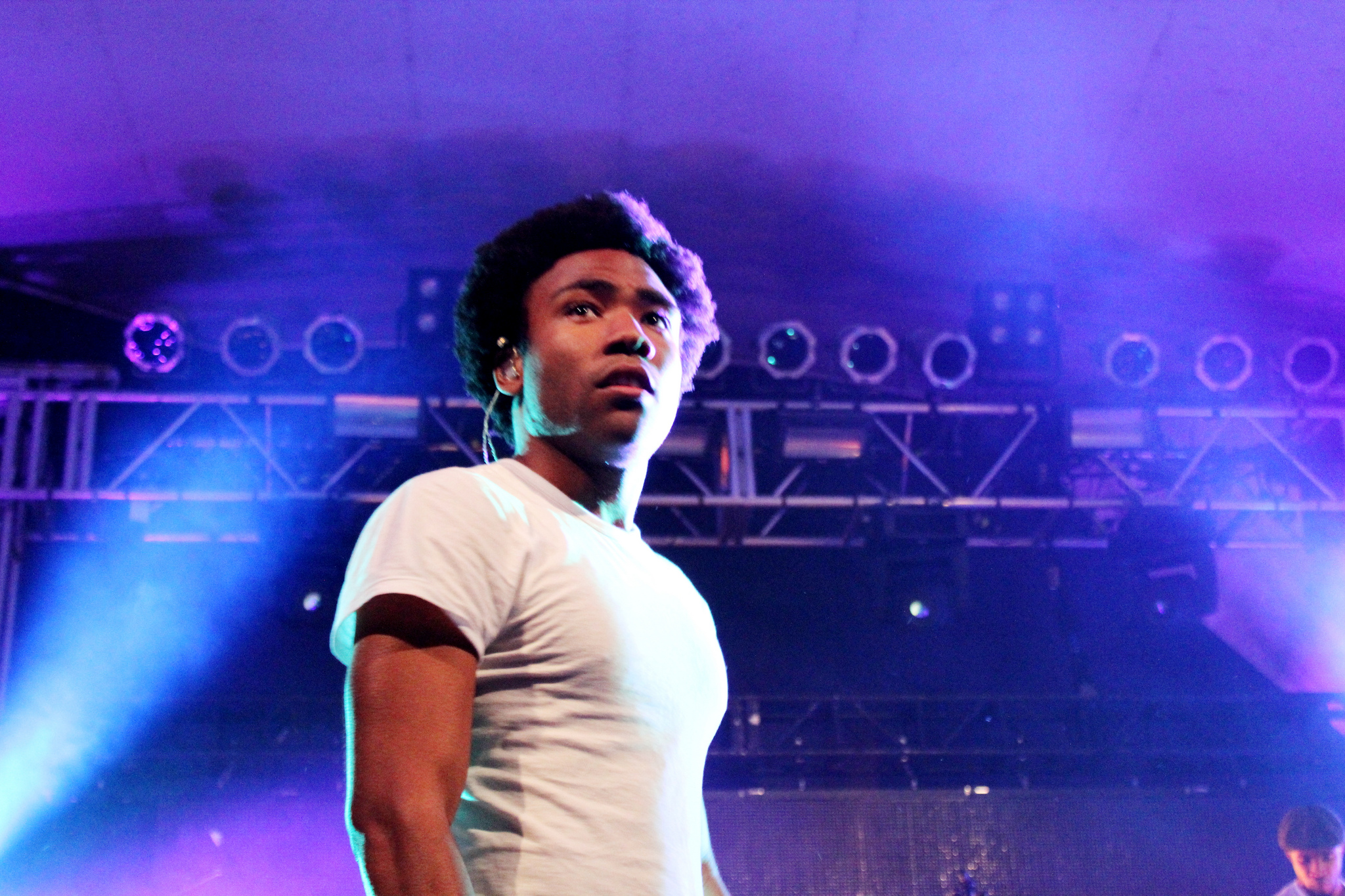
- Childish Gambino performing in Austin, Texas in 2012
- Studio albums: 5
- Extended plays: 4
- Singles: 15
- Music videos: 12
- Mixtapes: 14

The discography of American hip hop recording artist and actor Childish Gambino comprises five studio albums, fourteen mixtapes, and four EPs. After releasing his first five mixtapes and EP independently, he signed to Glassnote Records and released Camp (2011), his first album on a major record label.

== Studio albums ==
Title	Album details	Peak chart positions										Sales	Certifications
Title	Album details	US	US R&B /HH	AUS	BEL (FL)	CAN	IRL	NL	NZ	SWI	UK	Sales	Certifications
Camp	Released: November 15, 2011; Label: Glassnote, Universal; Formats: CD, LP, digital download	11	2	99	—	22	—	—	—	—	—	US: 242,000	BPI: Silver
Because the Internet	Released: December 10, 2013; Label: Glassnote, Island, Universal; Formats: CD, LP, digital download	7	3	37	—	12	—	—	—	—	107	US: 796,000	RIAA: Gold; ARIA: Gold; BPI: Gold; MC: Platinum
"Awaken, My Love!"	Released: December 2, 2016; Label: Glassnote, Island, Universal; Formats: CD, LP, digital download, streaming	5	2	9	76	7	28	33	21	89	34	US: 1,320,000	RIAA: Platinum; BPI: Gold; IFPI DEN: Gold; MC: Platinum
3.15.20	Released: March 22, 2020; Label: RCA; Formats: Digital download, streaming	13	8	11	24	17	17	60	18	45	20		
Bando Stone & the New World	Released: July 19, 2024; Label: RCA; Formats: LP, digital download, streaming	16	2	30	41	17	29	30	18	14	33		
"—" denotes items which were not released in that country or failed to chart.

=== Reissues ===
Title	Album details	Peak chart positions									
Title	Album details	US	US R&B /HH	AUS	BEL (FL)	CAN	IRL	LTU	NZ	POR	SWI
Atavista	Released: May 13, 2024; Label: RCA; Formats: LP, digital download, streaming	62	23	40	72	84	74	98	31	72	51

== EPs ==
Title	EP details	Peak chart positions								Sales
Title	EP details	US	US R&B /HH	US Rap	AUS	FRA	SCO	UK	UK R&B /HH	Sales
EP	Released: March 8, 2011; Format: Digital download	—	—	—	—	—	—	—	—	
Kauai	Released: October 3, 2014; Format: Digital download	13	2	1	25	—	17	85	3	US: 42,000
Summer Pack	Released: July 11, 2018; Format: Digital download	—	—	—	—	150	—	—	—	
Swarm (with Ni'jah and Kirby)	Released: March 17, 2023; Format: Digital download	—	—	—	—	—	—	—	—	
"—" denotes items which were not released in that country or failed to chart.

== Mixtapes ==
Title	Mixtape details
The Younger I Get	Released: 2005; Self-released/Out of print; Format: CD
Illin-Noise: Sufjan Stevens Remix Album	Released: August 27, 2005; Self-released; Format: Digital download
Apple Sauce: Fiona Apple Remix Album	Released: November 6, 2005; Self-released; Format: Digital download
Utterances of the Heart	Released: June 8, 2006; Self-released; Format: Digital download
Love Letter in an Unbreakable Bottle	Released: March 16, 2007; Self-released; Format: Digital download
New Year's Eve Extravaganza Mix	Released: December 31, 2007; Self-released; Format: Digital download
Sick Boi	Released: June 5, 2008; Self-released; Format: Digital download
Fuck Yaselves!	Released: 2009; Self-released; Format: Digital download
Poindexter	Released: September 17, 2009; Self-released; Format: Digital download
I Am Just a Rapper	Released: January 5, 2010; Self-released; Format: Digital download
I Am Just a Rapper 2	Released: February 4, 2010; Self-released; Format: Digital download
Culdesac	Released: July 3, 2010; Self-released; Format: Digital download
Royalty	Released: July 4, 2012; Format: Digital download
STN MTN	Released: October 2, 2014; Format: Digital download

== Singles ==
=== As lead artist ===
List of singles as lead artist, with selected chart positions, showing year released and album name
Title	Year	Peak chart positions										Certifications	Album
Title	Year	US	US R&B /HH	AUS	CAN	FRA	IRL	NZ	POR	SWE	UK	Certifications	Album
"Bonfire"	2011	—	— (Note: "Bonfire" did not enter the Billboard Hot R&B/Hip-Hop Songs chart, but peaked at number 49 on the R&B/Hip-Hop Digital Song Sales chart.)	—	—	—	—	—	—	—	—	RIAA: Gold; ARIA: Platinum; BPI: Gold; RMNZ: Platinum	Camp
"Heartbeat"	2011	— (Note: "Heartbeat" did not enter the Billboard Hot 100, but peaked at number 18 on the Bubbling Under Hot 100 Singles chart.)	54	— (Note: "Heartbeat" did not enter the Australian ARIA Singles Chart but peaked at number 20 on the ARIA Hitseekers Chart.)	—	—	—	—	—	—	97	RIAA: Platinum; ARIA: Platinum; BPI: Platinum; MC: Gold; RMNZ: 2× Platinum	Camp
"Fire Fly"	2012	—	—	—	—	—	—	—	—	—	—		Camp
"3005"	2013	64	19	81	—	188	—	—	—	—	79	RIAA: Platinum; ARIA: 2× Platinum; BPI: 2× Platinum; MC: 2× Platinum; RMNZ: 4× Platinum	Because the Internet
"Crawl"	2014	86	28	—	—	—	—	—	—	—	150		Because the Internet
"Sweatpants"	2014	— (Note: "Sweatpants" did not enter the Billboard Hot 100, but peaked at number 24 on the Bubbling Under Hot 100 Singles chart.)	35	—	—	—	—	—	—	—	—	RIAA: Gold; ARIA: Gold; BPI: Silver; MC: Platinum; RMNZ: Platinum	Because the Internet
"Sober"	2014	— (Note: "Sober" did not enter the Billboard Hot 100, but peaked at number two on the Bubbling Under Hot 100 Singles chart.)	29	70	—	—	—	—	—	—	—	ARIA: Platinum; BPI: Silver; RMNZ: Platinum	Kauai
"Me and Your Mama"	2016	68	28	75	52	—	—	— (Note: "Me and Your Mama" did not enter the NZ Top 40 Singles Chart, but peaked at number four on the NZ Heatseekers Singles Chart.)	—	—	—	ARIA: Gold; BPI: Platinum; MC: Gold; RMNZ: Platinum	"Awaken, My Love!"
"Redbone"	2016	12	6	27	30	154	42	22	34	92	51	RIAA: 5× Platinum; ARIA: 5× Platinum; BPI: 3× Platinum; FIMI: Gold; GLF: Gold; MC: 4× Platinum; RMNZ: 7× Platinum; SNEP: Platinum	"Awaken, My Love!"
"Terrified"	2017	— (Note: "Terrified" did not enter the Billboard Hot 100, but peaked at number 25 on the Bubbling Under Hot 100 Singles chart.)	— (Note: "Terrified" did not enter the Billboard Hot R&B/Hip-Hop Songs chart, but peaked at number 10 on the Bubbling Under R&B/Hip-Hop Singles chart.)	—	—	—	—	—	—	—	—		"Awaken, My Love!"
"This Is America"	2018	1	1	1	1	31	2	1	2	9	6	RIAA: 5× Platinum; AFP : Gold; ARIA: 3× Platinum; BPI: Platinum; GLF: Gold; MC: 3× Platinum; RMNZ: 2× Platinum; SNEP: Platinum	Non-album single
"Summertime Magic"	2018	44	21	31	33	193	21	29	26	40	30	RIAA: Platinum; ARIA: Platinum; BPI: Silver; MC: Gold; RMNZ: Platinum	Summer Pack
"Time" (featuring Ariana Grande)	2020	—	— (Note: "Time" did not enter the Billboard Hot R&B/Hip-Hop Songs chart, but peaked at number 24 on the Hot R&B Songs chart.)	—	—	—	—	— (Note: "Time" did not enter the NZ Top 40 Singles Chart, but peaked at number 21 on the NZ Hot Singles Chart.)	—	—	—		3.15.20
"Psilocybae (Millennial Love)" (featuring 21 Savage, Ink and Kadhja Bonet)	2020	—	— (Note: "Psilocybae (Millennial Love)" did not enter the Billboard Hot R&B/Hip-Hop Songs chart, but peaked at number 20 on the Hot R&B Songs chart.)	—	—	—	—	— (Note: "Psilocybae (Millennial Love)" did not enter the NZ Top 40 Singles Chart, but peaked at number 22 on the NZ Hot Singles Chart under the name "12.38".)	—	—	—		3.15.20
"Sweet Thang"	2020	—	—	—	—	—	—	—	—	—	—		3.15.20
"Lithonia"	2024	69	—	—	85	—	91	— (Note: "Lithonia" did not enter the NZ Top 40 Singles Chart, but peaked at number 14 on the NZ Hot Singles Chart.)	—	—	88	RIAA: Gold	Bando Stone & the New World
"In the Night" (featuring Jorja Smith and Amaarae)	2024	— (Note: "In the Night" did not enter the Billboard Hot 100, but peaked at number 17 on the Bubbling Under Hot 100 Singles chart.)	38	—	—	—	—	— (Note: "In the Night" did not enter the NZ Top 40 Singles Chart, but peaked at number 14 on the NZ Hot Singles Chart.)	—	—	98		Bando Stone & the New World
"—" denotes a recording that did not chart or was not released in that territory.

=== As featured artist ===
List of singles, with selected chart positions, showing year released and album name
Title	Year	Peak chart positions										Certifications	Album
Title	Year	US Bub.	US R&B /HH	AUS	AUT	BEL (FL)	GER	IRE	NL Tip	SWI	UK	Certifications	Album
"Giants" (Josh Osho featuring Childish Gambino)	2012	—	—	—	—	—	—	—	—	—	—		L.I.F.E
"Trouble" (Leona Lewis featuring Childish Gambino)	2012	—	—	—	32	—	27	21	—	75	7		Glassheart
"Do or Die" (Flux Pavilion featuring Childish Gambino)	2013	—	—	48	—	—	—	—	—	—	—		Blow the Roof
"Bed Peace" (Jhené Aiko featuring Childish Gambino)	2013	—	— (Note: "Bed Peace" did not enter the Hot R&B/Hip-Hop Songs chart, but peaked at number one on the Bubbling Under R&B/Hip-Hop Singles chart.)	—	—	—	—	—	—	—	— (Note: "Bed Peace" did not enter the UK Singles Chart, but peaked at number 48 on the UK Singles Sales Chart.)	RIAA: 2× Platinum; RMNZ: Platinum	Sail Out
"Jump Hi" (Lion Babe featuring Childish Gambino)	2014	—	—	—	—	— (Note: "Jump Hi" did not enter the Flanders Ultratop 50, but peaked at number 51 on the Ultratip chart.)	—	—	—	—	—		Begin
"Together" (Selah Sue featuring Childish Gambino)	2014	—	—	—	—	46	—	—	19	—	—		Reason
"Stay High" (Childish Gambino remix)	2021	—	— (Note: "Stay High" (Childish Gambino remix) did not enter the Billboard Hot R&B/Hip-Hop Songs chart, but peaked at number 21 on the Hot R&B Songs chart.)	—	—	—	—	—	—	—	—		Jaime (Reimagined)
"Sunshine" (Latto featuring Lil Wayne and Childish Gambino)	2022	25	—	—	—	—	—	—	—	—	—		777
"I Love You More Than You Know" (Black Party featuring Childish Gambino)	2022	—	—	—	—	—	—	—	—	—	—		Hummingbird
"More Dollars, More Sense 1994" (Jason Martin and DJ Quik featuring Childish Gambino)	2023	—	—	—	—	—	—	—	—	—	—		A Compton Story
"One Wish" (Ravyn Lenae featuring Childish Gambino)	2024	—	— (Note: "One Wish" did not enter the Billboard Hot R&B/Hip-Hop Songs chart, but peaked at number 21 on the Hot R&B Songs chart.)	—	—	—	—	—	—	—	—		Bird's Eye
"Running" (Dahi featuring Childish Gambino)	2026												Black Boy (Alternative)
"—" denotes a recording that did not chart or was not released in that territory.

=== Promotional singles ===
List of promotional singles, with selected chart positions, showing year released and album name
Title	Year	Peak chart positions										Certifications	Album
Title	Year	US	US R&B /HH	AUS	BEL (FL) Tip	CAN	IRL	NZ	POR	SCO	UK	Certifications	Album
"Telegraph Ave. ("Oakland" by Lloyd)"	2014	—	—	—	—	—	—	—	—	—	—		Because the Internet
"Feels Like Summer"	2018	54	25	79	13	47	51	— (Note: "Feels Like Summer" did not enter the NZ Top 40 Singles Chart, but peaked at number 16 on the NZ Hot Singles Chart.)	76	71	64	RIAA: Platinum; AFP : Gold; ARIA: Platinum; BPI: Gold; MC: Gold; RMNZ: Platinum	Summer Pack and 3.15.20 (Note: "Feels Like Summer" was included on the album 3.15.20 under the title 42.26 (the title refers to the time at which the song appears on the album).)
"—" denotes a recording that did not chart or was not released in that territory.

== Other charted and certified songs ==
List of other charted songs, with selected chart positions, showing year released and album name
Title	Year	Peak chart positions										Certifications	Album
Title	Year	US	US R&B /HH	AUS	CAN	FRA	IRE	LTU	NZ	UK	WW	Certifications	Album
"L.E.S."	2011	—	—	—	—	—	—	91	—	—	—	BPI: Platinum; RMNZ: Platinum	Camp
"Favorite Song" (Chance the Rapper featuring Childish Gambino)	2013	—	— (Note: "Favorite Song" did not enter the Billboard Hot R&B/Hip-Hop Songs chart, but peaked at number 20 on the R&B/Hip-Hop Digital Song Sales chart.)	—	—	—	—	—	—	—	—		Acid Rap
"II. Worldstar"	2013	— (Note: "II. Worldstar" did not enter the Billboard Hot 100, but peaked at number nine on the Bubbling Under Hot 100 chart, which acts as an extension to the Hot 100.)	35	—	—	—	—	—	—	—	—		Because the Internet
"The Worst Guys" (featuring Chance the Rapper)	2013	—	—	—	—	—	—	—	—	—	—	MC: Gold	Because the Internet
"Break Your Heart Right Back" (Ariana Grande featuring Childish Gambino)	2014	— (Note: "Break Your Heart Right Back" did not enter the Billboard Hot 100, but peaked at number twelve on the Bubbling Under Hot 100 chart.)	—	—	—	—	—	—	—	—	—		My Everything
"Driving Ms. Daisy" (Logic featuring Childish Gambino)	2014	—	— (Note: "Driving Ms. Daisy" did not enter the Hot R&B/Hip-Hop Songs chart, but peaked at number six on the Bubbling Under R&B/Hip-Hop Singles chart.)	—	—	—	—	—	—	—	—		Under Pressure
"Retro"	2015	—	— (Note: "Retro" did not enter the Billboard Hot R&B/Hip-Hop Songs chart, but peaked at number 37 on the R&B/Hip-Hop Digital Song Sales chart.)	76	—	—	—	—	—	—	—	ARIA: Gold	Kauai
"California"	2016	— (Note: "California" did not enter the Billboard Hot 100, but peaked at number six on the Bubbling Under Hot 100 chart.)	— (Note: "California" did not enter the Hot R&B/Hip-Hop Songs, but peaked at number one on the Bubbling Under R&B/Hip-Hop Songs chart.)	—	—	—	—	—	—	—	—		"Awaken, My Love!"
"Have Some Love"	2016	— (Note: "Have Some Love" did not enter the Billboard Hot 100, but peaked at number fifteen on the Bubbling Under Hot 100 chart.)	— (Note: "Have Some Love" did not enter the Hot R&B/Hip-Hop Songs, but peaked at number eight on the Bubbling Under R&B/Hip-Hop Songs chart.)	—	—	—	—	—	— (Note: "Have Some Love" did not enter the NZ Top 40 Singles Chart, but peaked at number seven on the NZ Heatseekers Singles Chart.)	—	—		"Awaken, My Love!"
"Zombies"	2016	— (Note: "Zombies" did not enter the Billboard Hot 100, but peaked at number twenty-one on the Bubbling Under Hot 100 chart.)	— (Note: "Zombies" did not enter the Hot R&B/Hip-Hop Songs, but peaked at number nine on the Bubbling Under R&B/Hip-Hop Songs chart.)	—	—	—	—	—	—	—	—		"Awaken, My Love!"
"Can You Feel the Love Tonight" (with Beyoncé, Billy Eichner and Seth Rogen)	2019	—	—	93	—	71	75	—	— (Note: "Can You Feel the Love Tonight" did not enter the NZ Top 40 Singles Chart, but peaked at number eight on the NZ Hot Singles Chart.)	87	—		The Lion King
"Mood 4 Eva" (with Beyoncé and Jay-Z featuring Oumou Sangaré)	2019	90	33	—	48	—	54	—	—	56	—		The Lion King: The Gift
"0.00"	2020	—	—	—	—	—	—	—	— (Note: "0.00" did not enter the NZ Top 40 Singles Chart, but peaked at number 27 on the NZ Hot Singles Chart.)	—	—		3.15.20
"Algorhythm"	2020	—	—	—	—	—	—	—	— (Note: "Algorhythm" did not enter the NZ Top 40 Singles Chart, but peaked at number 23 on the NZ Hot Singles Chart.)	—	—		3.15.20
"New Type" (Summer Walker featuring Childish Gambino)	2023	— (Note: "New Type" did not enter the Billboard Hot 100, but peaked at number 24 on the Bubbling Under Hot 100 chart.)	41	—	—	—	—	—	— (Note: "New Type" did not enter the NZ Top 40 Singles Chart, but peaked at number 40 on the NZ Hot Singles Chart.)	—	—		Clear 2: Soft Life
"Atavista"	2024	—	— (Note: "Atavista" did not enter the Billboard Hot R&B/Hip-Hop Songs chart, but peaked at number 12 on the Hot R&B Songs chart.)	—	—	—	—	—	— (Note: "Atavista" did not enter the NZ Top 40 Singles Chart, but peaked at number 30 on the NZ Hot Singles Chart.)	—	—		Atavista
"Little Foot Big Foot" (featuring Young Nudy)	2024	—	— (Note: "Little Foot Big Foot" did not enter the Billboard Hot R&B/Hip-Hop Songs chart, but peaked at number 11 on the Hot R&B Songs chart.)	—	—	—	—	—	— (Note: "Little Foot Big Foot" did not enter the NZ Top 40 Singles Chart, but peaked at number 26 on the NZ Hot Singles Chart.)	—	—		Atavista
"Witchy" (Kaytranada featuring Childish Gambino)	2024	—	— (Note: "Witchy" did not enter the Billboard Hot R&B/Hip-Hop Songs chart, but peaked at number 10 on the Hot R&B Songs chart.)	—	—	—	—	—	—	—	—		Timeless
"Hearts Were Meant to Fly"	2024	—	—	—	—	—	—	—	— (Note: "Hearts Were Meant to Fly" did not enter the NZ Top 40 Singles Chart, but peaked at number 24 on the NZ Hot Singles Chart.)	—	—		Bando Stone & the New World
"Steps Beach"	2024	—	— (Note: "Steps Beach" did not enter the Billboard Hot R&B/Hip-Hop Songs chart, but peaked at number nine on the Hot R&B Songs chart.)	—	—	—	—	—	—	—	—		Bando Stone & the New World
"Talk My Shit" (featuring Amaarae and Flo Milli)	2024	—	—	—	—	—	—	—	— (Note: "Talk My Shit" did not enter the NZ Top 40 Singles Chart, but peaked at number 27 on the NZ Hot Singles Chart.)	—	—		Bando Stone & the New World
"Yoshinoya"	2024	—	50	—	—	—	—	—	—	—	—		Bando Stone & the New World
"Can You Feel Me" (featuring Legend)	2024	—	— (Note: "Can You Feel Me" did not enter the Billboard Hot R&B/Hip-Hop Songs chart, but peaked at number 20 on the Hot R&B Songs chart.)	—	—	—	—	—	—	—	—		Bando Stone & the New World
"No Excuses" (featuring Ludwig Göransson and Kamasi Washington)	2024	—	— (Note: "No Excuses" did not enter the Billboard Hot R&B/Hip-Hop Songs chart, but peaked at number 18 on the Hot R&B Songs chart.)	—	—	—	—	—	—	—	—		Bando Stone & the New World
"Damn Right" (Jennie featuring Childish Gambino and Kali Uchis)	2025	—	— (Note: "Damn Right" did not enter the Billboard Hot R&B/Hip-Hop Songs chart, but peaked at number 24 on the Hot R&B Songs chart.)	—	—	—	—	—	—	—	182		Ruby
"—" denotes a recording that did not chart or was not released in that territory.

== Guest appearances ==
List of non-single guest appearances, with other performing artists, showing year released and album name
Title	Year	Other artist(s)	Album
"101 Rap"	2010	Danny Pudi	Community (Music From The Original Television Series)
"Somewhere Out There"	2010	Danny Pudi	Community (Music From The Original Television Series)
"Who Datt Pt. 2"	2011	J. Cole, Spencer Datt	What's Poppin' Volume One
"Womyn 2"	2012	Heems	Nehru Jackets
"Level Up (International Remix)"	2012	Sway	The Deliverance
"Tricks"	2012	Ludwig Göransson	How to Find a Party
"Beautiful Music"	2012	Rapsody, GQ	The Idea of Beautiful
"Same Ol' Story"	2012	DJ Drama, Kid Ink, Schoolboy Q, Cory Gunz	Quality Street Music
"Tell Me"	2012	Heems	Wild Water Kingdom
"Young, Rich, Fly & Famous"	2013	Cyhi the Prynce	Ivy League: Kick Back
"Ghost"	2013	Kilo Kish	K+
"Scones"	2013	Kilo Kish	K+
"Think of Me"	2013	Funkmaster Flex	Who You Mad At? Me or Yourself?
"Body So Tight"	2013	DJ Reflex	—N/a
"FDB (Remix)"	2013	Young Dro	—N/a
"More Than Normal"	2013	Alan Wilkis	Print
"Feel the Love (Woz Remix)"	2013	Rudimental	—N/a
"Ea$tside"	2013	Trinidad James, Gucci Mane, Young Scooter, Alley Boy	10 PC Mild
"Who No Know Go Know"	2013	Just A Band	Red Hot + Fela
"Relations (Remix)"	2013	Kenna	Land 2 Air Chronicles II: Imitation Is Suicide Chapter 1
"God Save the Villain"	2014	Erick Arc Elliott	—N/a
"Trillion Girls"	2014	Jr. Hi	Virtual Lover EP
"Hide" (Tropkillaz Remix)	2014	N.A.S.A., Aynzli Jones	—N/a
"Driving Ms. Daisy'	2014	Logic	Under Pressure
"Lava Glaciers"	2014	Riff Raff	Neon Icon
"Riot"	2014	Fredo Santana	Walking Legend
"Break Your Heart Right Back"	2014	Ariana Grande	My Everything
"Dollaz and Sense"	2014	Problem	354: Lift Off
"Waiting for My Moment"	2015	Jhené Aiko, Vince Staples, Ludwig Göransson	Creed: Original Motion Picture Soundtrack
"Existential Crisis Hour!"	2016	Kilo Kish	Reflections in Real Time
"No Hookahs"	2016	Steve G. Lover III	Rich Black American
"Monster"	2018	21 Savage	I Am > I Was
"Mood 4 Eva"	2019	Beyonce, Jay-Z	The Lion King: The Gift
"Black Qualls"	2020	Thundercat, Steve Lacy, Steve Arrington	It Is What It Is
"Stay High (Childish Gambino Remix)"	2021	Brittany Howard	Jaime (Reimagined)
"Sticky"	2023	Ni'jah	Swarm
"New Type"	2023	Summer Walker	Clear 2: Soft Life
"Witchy"	2024	Kaytranada	Timeless
"I Killed You"	2024	Tyler, The Creator	Chromakopia
"Judge Judy"	2024	Tyler, The Creator	Chromakopia
"Damn Right"	2025	Jennie, Kali Uchis	Ruby

== Music videos ==
As lead artist
Year	Title	Album	Director
2011	"Freaks and Geeks"	EP	Dan Eckman
2011	"Bonfire"	Camp	Dan Eckman
2012	"Heartbeat"	Camp	Kyle Newacheck
2012	"Firefly"	Camp	High5Collective
2013	"L.E.S."	Camp	Ibra Ake
2013	"The Worst Guys" (featuring Chance the Rapper)	Because the Internet	Kyle & Adam Newacheck
2013	"3005"	Because the Internet	Hiro Murai
2014	"Sweatpants/Urn"	Because the Internet	Hiro Murai
2014	"Telegraph Ave ("Oakland" By Lloyd)"	Because the Internet	Hiro Murai
2015	"Sober"	STN MTN / Kauai	Hiro Murai
2015	"Tell Me" (unreleased) (featuring Heems)	Royalty	Max
2018	"This Is America"	Non-album single	Hiro Murai
2018	"Feels Like Summer"	Summer Pack	Donald Glover, Ivan Dixon & Greg Sharp
2024	"Little Foot Big Foot"	Atavista	Hiro Murai
2024	"Lithonia"	Bando Stone & the New World	Jack Begert

As featured artist
Title	Album	Director
"Giants" (Josh Osho)	L.I.F.E.	Jordan Bahat
"Favorite Song" (Chance the Rapper)	Acid Rap	
"Bed Peace" (Jhené Aiko)	Sail Out	Danny Williams
"Do or Die" (Flux Pavilion)	Blow the Roof	
"Relations (Remix)" (Kenna)	Land 2 Air Chronicles II: Imitation Is Suicide Chapter 1	Jason Chen
"Jump Hi" (Lion Babe)	Begin	
"The Pressure" (Jhené Aiko)	Souled Out	Childish Gambino
"Gahdamn" (Kari Faux)	Laugh Now, Die Later	Calmatic
"Garden (Say It Like Dat)" (SZA)	Ctrl	Karena Evans
""I Love You More Than You Know" (bLAck pARty)	Hummingbird	Malik Flint & Manny Singh
"One Wish" (Rayvn Lenae)	Bird's Eye	
"Witchy" (KAYTRANADA)	Timeless	Bethany Vargas
