= Freaks and Greeks =

Freaks and Greeks may refer to:

- "Freaks & Greeks" (Drawn Together), an episode of Drawn Together.
- "Freaks and Greeks" (Legends of Tomorrow), an episode of DC's Legends of Tomorrow.

== See also ==
- Freaks and Geeks, an American TV series
- "Freaks and Geeks", a song by Childish Gambino from EP
