= Garfunkel and Oates =

American comedy-folk music duo

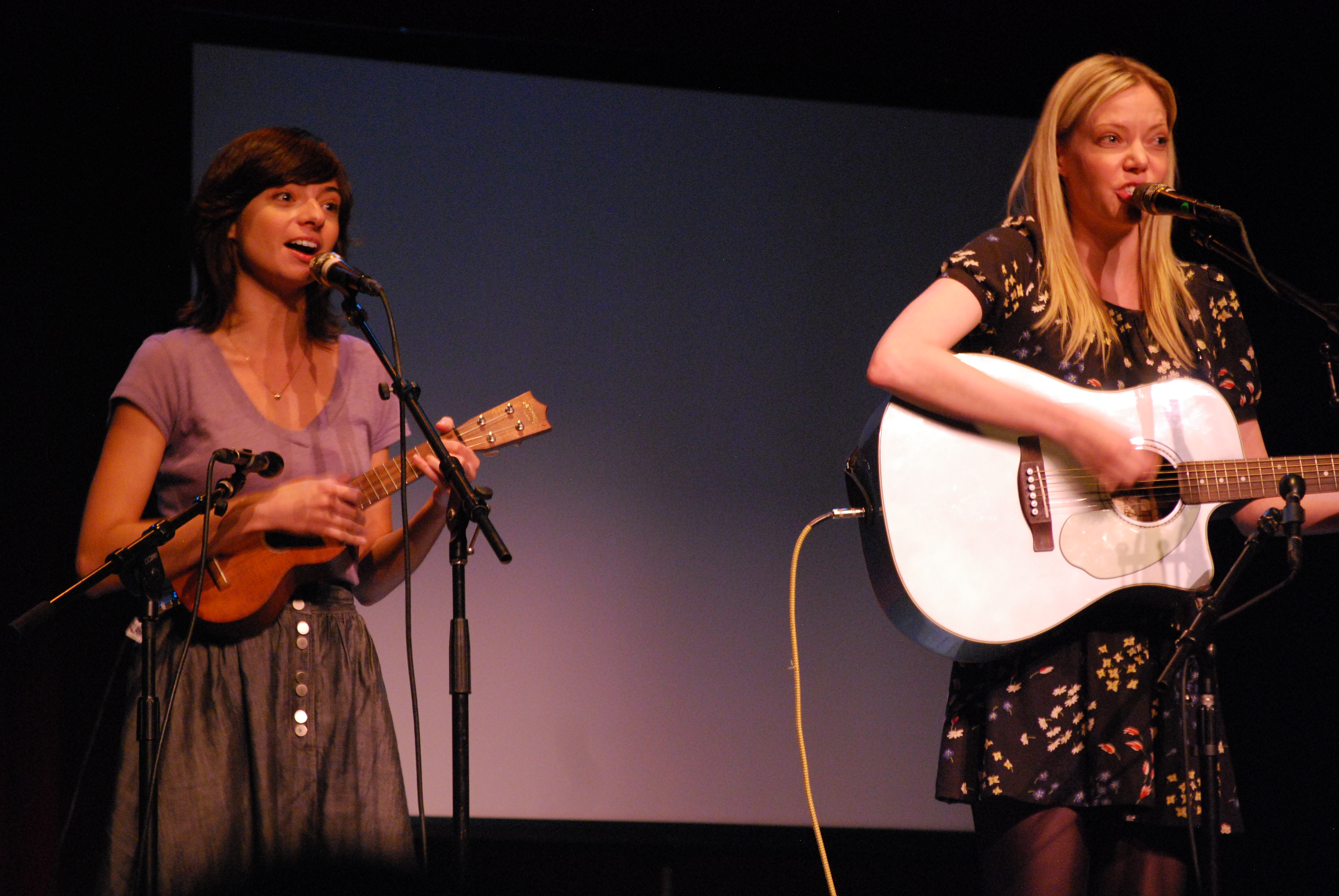
- Garfunkel and Oates performing in 2010; Kate Micucci (left) and Riki Lindhome (right)

Background information
- Origin: Los Angeles, California, U.S.
- Genres: Comedy folk; folk pop; folk rock
- Years active: 2007–present
- Members: Riki Lindhome; Kate Micucci
- Website: garfunkelandoates.com

Garfunkel and Oates is an American comedy folk duo consisting of actresses Riki Lindhome, who performs as Garfunkel, and Kate Micucci, who performs as Oates. Their fast-paced songs typically combine raunchy observational comedy with sweet-sounding melodies and vocals. The duo was formed in 2007 in Los Angeles after Lindhome and Micucci met during an improv show at the Upright Citizens Brigade Theatre. They began releasing songs on YouTube in 2007 and became popular through the website. Garfunkel and Oates' debut studio album, All Over Your Face, was released in 2011, while their second studio album, Slippery When Moist (2012), topped the Billboard Comedy Albums chart. They released their third studio album, Secretions, in 2015.

Garfunkel and Oates went on their first tour in 2013. They starred in an eponymous comedy TV series (2014), which aired on IFC for one season. Their Vimeo comedy special, Garfunkel and Oates: Trying to Be Special (2016), was nominated for a Primetime Emmy Award for Outstanding Original Music and Lyrics at the 68th Primetime Emmy Awards. The duo wrote the music for the Netflix children's TV series Waffles + Mochi (2021) and will executive produce and write the music for the upcoming animated film Steps.

== History ==
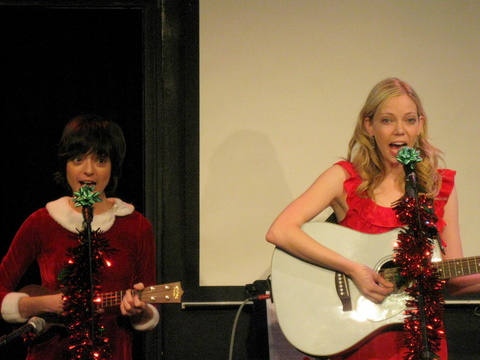
Garfunkel and Oates in 2009

=== 2007–2010: Formation and YouTube ===
Riki Lindhome and Kate Micucci went to the same music camp in upstate Pennsylvania when both of them were in fifth grade, but were unaware of each other at the time. Both began playing music from a young age, with Lindhome starting the flute at nine years old, and Micucci learning to play piano at four years old. Micucci learned to play ukulele while working at a pineapple plant in Hawaii after graduating from college. Years later, both of them separately moved to Los Angeles, with Lindhome pursuing an acting career and Micucci coming after college with plans to design puppets. They met each other again in the lobby at the Upright Citizens Brigade Theatre in Los Angeles during a Doug Benson show, where the two were both "on bad dates" and recognized each other from commercial auditions. Lindhome and Micucci soon became close friends and started writing comedy songs together.

The two began performing as Garfunkel and Oates in 2007. The duo's name was inspired by Lindhome seeing Hall & Oates perform at the Hollywood Bowl and noticing that Hall would get his own closeups, while Oates was only filmed with the rest of the band, and thinking about the "silver-medalists" of other bands. Garfunkel and Oates was formed when they started working together to adapt Imaginary Larry (2009), a short film written by Lindhome during the 2007–08 Writers Guild of America strike, into a musical.

Lindhome posted a video of the duo performing to YouTube in 2007 for her friends and family to watch, which soon appeared on the website's home page. After their song "Fuck You" became popular on YouTube in 2009, Garfunkel and Oates earned a large following online and decided to start performing professionally. In early 2009, they started the Garfunkel and Oates Hour, a monthly live show that became popular at the Upright Citizens Brigade Theater. They gained more attention after Micucci appeared and performed "Screw You" (a censored version of "Fuck You") on Scrubs in 2009. In December 2009, Garfunkel and Oates performed on The Jay Leno Show. Also in 2009, the duo performed as an opening act for John Oates. They performed their song "Pregnant Women are Smug" on The Tonight Show with Jay Leno in March 2010, and were featured on Childish Gambino's song "These Girls" from his mixtape Culdesac, released in July 2010.

=== 2011–2013: All Over Your Face, Slippery When Moist, and TV series ===
In January 2011, Garfunkel and Oates released their debut studio album All Over Your Face. That same month, the duo signed a deal with HBO for a pilot of their own eponymous TV series. HBO did not give the pilot a full series, but released it as five separate shorts on HBO Go in August 2012, which included a music video for their song "Pregnant Women are Smug". Garfunkel and Oates released a music video for their song "This Party Took a Turn for the Douche" in February 2011 and a music video for their song "Weed Card" in April 2011. In October 2011, the duo performed the song "David Wain is Sexy" in David Wain's web series Wainy Days. The following year, Garfunkel and Oates were featured in Comedy Central's stand-up comedy TV series The Half Hour. They released their second studio album, Slippery When Moist, on February 21, 2012, which topped Billboard's Comedy Albums chart. The duo released their song "29/31" in May 2012.

In June 2013, Garfunkel and Oates released the song "The Loophole" about Christians retaining their technical virginity by practicing anal sex alongside a music video filmed at a pornographic film studio. It inspired a TikTok trend of videos set to the song in 2021. From August to December 2013, the duo went on tour throughout the United States in partnership with the Monster Energy Outbreak Tour as part of their first comedy tour. In September 2014, IFC approved Garfunkel and Oates, a TV sitcom directed by Fred Savage and starring the duo as fictionalized versions of themselves navigating the Los Angeles comedy scene. The show aired from August to September 2014. It was cancelled by IFC in March 2015.

=== 2015–present: Secretions and Trying to Be Special ===
In September 2015, Garfunkel and Oates released their third studio album, Secretions. They wrote the song "If I Didn't Have You (Bernadette's Song)" for "The Romance Resonance", an episode of the TV sitcom The Big Bang Theory, which was performed by Simon Helberg. Both Lindhome and Micucci appeared on Big Bang Theory. In 2016, Garfunkel and Oates released a Vimeo comedy special titled Garfunkel and Oates: Trying to Be Special. It depicts Micucci and Lindhome hosting a fundraising concert so they can afford to film their own comedy special and was hosted by Anthony Jeselnik. The special was nominated for a Primetime Emmy Award for Outstanding Original Music and Lyrics at the 68th Primetime Emmy Awards for the duo's song "Frozen Lullaby". They also wrote the song "Fuck You in Heaven" for a 2016 episode of the TV series Another Period, which stars Lindhome.

In February 2019, Garfunkel and Oates appeared on the soundtrack for the 2019 film The Lego Movie 2: The Second Part with a "Tween Dream" remix of The Lego Movie theme song from five years prior, "Everything Is Awesome". Jeremy Konner, the co-creator of the Netflix children's TV series Waffles + Mochi, reached out to the duo and asked them to write a song about a tomato while he was pitching the series. Former First Lady of the United States Michelle Obama, the show's star and executive producer, heard the demo and chose them to write the music for the series. The show aired in March 2021 and featured seven songs written by Garfunkel and Oates. In August 2021, the duo wrote a musical number for Lindhome's character Kimberly on an episode of the animated sitcom series Duncanville, "Off with the Braces". They were featured in the music video for George Harrison's song "My Sweet Lord" in December 2021. The upcoming animated musical film Steps will be executive produced by Lindhome and Micucci, who will also write all the lyrics.

== Artistry and public image ==
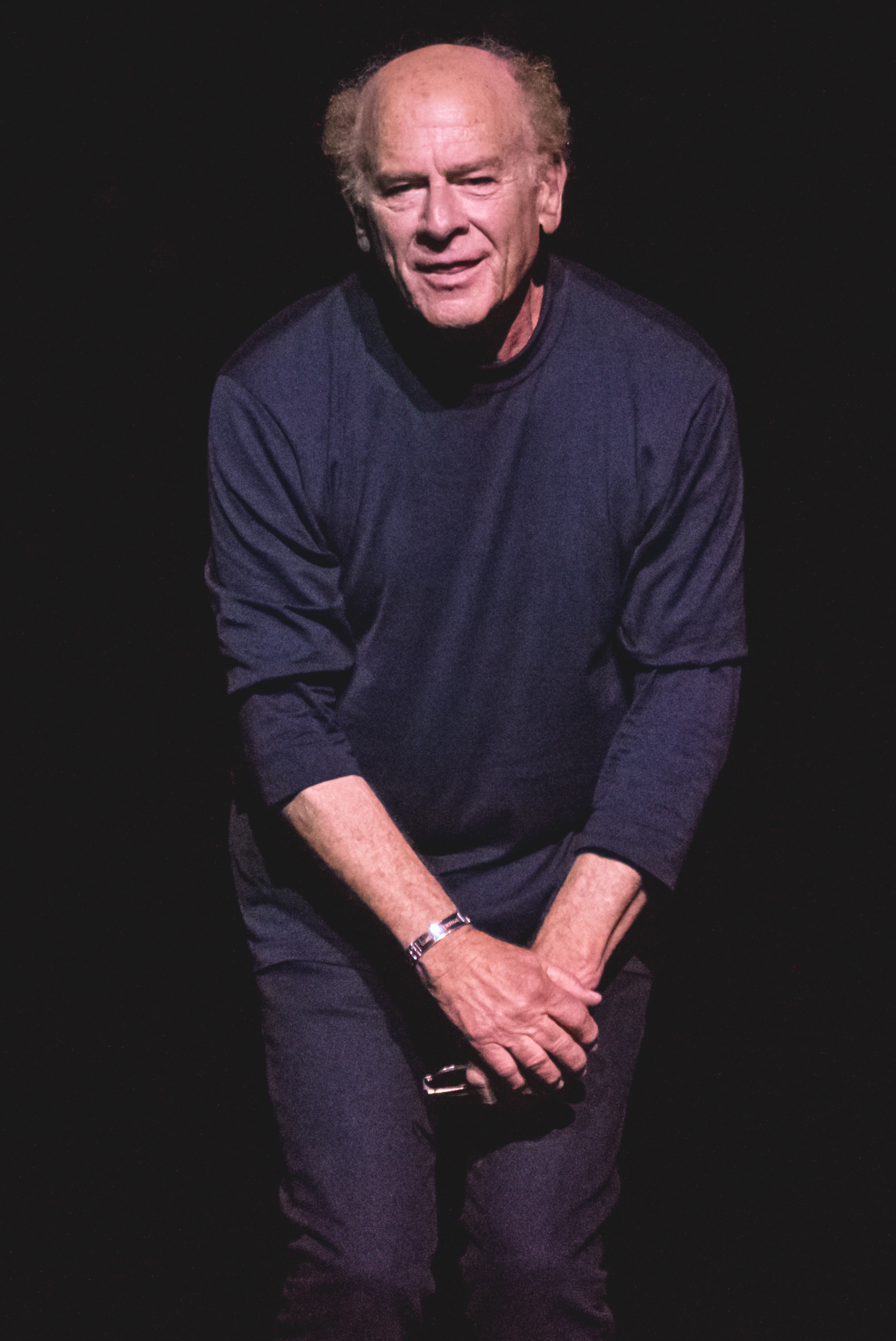
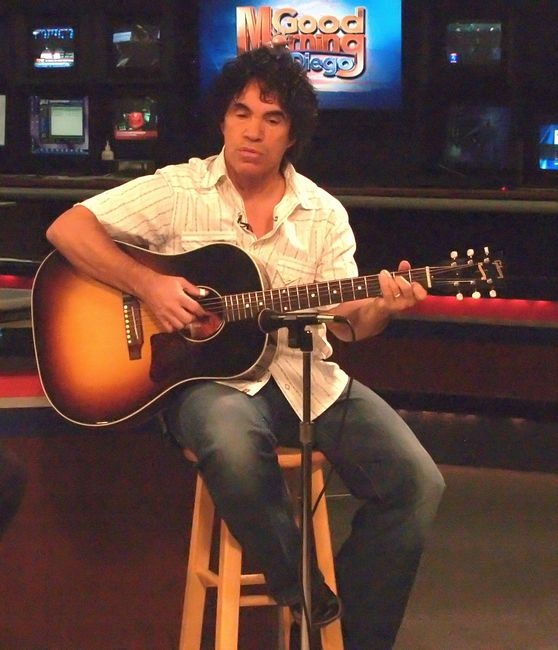
Garfunkel and Oates based their name on Art Garfunkel (left) of Simon & Garfunkel and John Oates (right) of Hall & Oates, who Lindhome described as the "silver medalists" of their respective musical duos

Garfunkel and Oates has described their music as folk pop and comedy music. Their music has also been described as comedy folk and folk rock. The work has frequently been compared by critics to that of comedy duo Flight of the Conchords. Micucci has stated that the duo's music is inspired by Broadway musicals, specifically those written by Stephen Sondheim, and 1980s pop music. Lindhome and Micucci have stated that their main comedic inspirations are I Love Lucy and The State, respectively. Lindhome plays guitar and performs as Garfunkel, based on Art Garfunkel of Simon & Garfunkel, while Micucci plays ukulele and keyboards and performs as Oates, based on John Oates of Hall & Oates. Their songwriting process typically involves Lindhome writing lyrics and Micucci writing melodies. Much of their music is fast-paced and contains raunchy, "brutally honest", observational lyrics contrasted with "cutesy", "childlike" melodies and "sweet" vocals.

In 2009, Rebecca Dana of The Wall Street Journal wrote that Garfunkel and Oates were "fast becoming the darlings of the Los Angeles comedy scene...with their pretty-girl, dirty-mouth act". Chrissie Dickinson of the Chicago Tribune called their music "funny and sharply pointed", adding that it "can also be disarmingly touching". NPR's David Greene called the duo "experts at wrapping ugly, hilarious truths into sweet melodies". The Daily Dot's Audra Schroeder called them "a Swiss Army knife, at a time when artists often have to be many things to stay afloat". Neal Justin of the Star Tribune compared the tone of their music to Sesame Street. For Vulture, Joe Berkowitz wrote that the songs "are filled with sharp observations and hilarious stories that are distinctly feminine and quirky", adding, "The blunt, detail-packed way they rebuke potential suitors or reveal embarrassing personal insights seems brutally honest."

Carson Olshansky and Milan Polk of Men's Health named Garfunkel and Oates's song "Present Face" one of the funniest Christmas songs of all time. Paste's Hudson Hongo named Micucci and Lindhome two of the best comedians of 2014 for their work as Garfunkel and Oates, while the two were included on Cosmopolitan's list of "13 Funny Women to Watch in 2014".

== Albums ==
=== Studio albums ===
List of studio albums, with selected chart positions
Title	Album details	Peak chart positions	
Title	Album details	US Comedy	US Heat.
All Over Your Face	Released: February 1, 2011; Label: Self-released; Formats: CD, digital download, streaming	4	—
Slippery When Moist	Released: February 21, 2012; Label: Self-released; Formats: CD, digital download, streaming	1	17
Secretions	Released: September 10, 2015; Label: Self-released; Formats: CD, digital download, streaming	2	20

=== EPs ===
List of extended plays
Title	Album details
Music Songs	Released: January 1, 2009; Label: Self-released; Formats: CD, digital download, streaming

=== Singles ===
Title	Year	Album
"Present Face"	2009	Non-album single

=== Guest appearances ===
Title	Year	Other artist(s)	Album
"These Girls"	2010	Childish Gambino	Culdesac
"Everything Is Awesome" (Tween Dream Remix)	2019	Eban Schletter	The Lego Movie 2: The Second Part
