= Bonfire (Childish Gambino song) =

2011 single by Childish Gambino

Single by Childish Gambino

from the album Camp
- Released: September 17, 2011
- Genre: Hip hop
- Length: 3:14
- Label: Glassnote
- Songwriter: Donald Glover
- Producers: Childish Gambino; Ludwig Göransson

Childish Gambino singles chronology
| "Bonfire" (2011) | "Heartbeat" (2011) |

Music video
- "Bonfire" on YouTube

"Bonfire" is the debut single by American rapper Childish Gambino. It was released on September 17, 2011, as the lead single from his debut studio album, Camp (2011), after its music video was released in July 2011. The song was produced by Gambino and Ludwig Göransson, and debuted on Funkmaster Flex's HOT 97 radio station.

== Composition ==
The song opens with Childish Gambino rapping, "OK, it's Childish Gambino, homegirl drop it like the NASDAQ" over a "heavy" beat. In the first verse, he references the video game ToeJam & Earl, rap collective Odd Future, TV series Invader Zim, PETA, clothing brand Band of Outsiders, and fast food chain Jollibee. He also addresses his Asian fetish ("This Asian dude, I stole his girl, and now he got that Kogi beef") and a stereotype of African-Americans in the entertainment industry ("Man, why does every black actor gotta rap some? / I don't know, all I know is I'm the best one").

== Critical reception ==
The song received generally positive reviews from critics. Childish Gambino's vocals in the song have been described as "raspy, aggressive spitting" and similar to Lil Wayne's flow. Singer Billie Eilish has described the song as having "the most hardcore bars I've ever heard".

== Music video ==
A music video for the song was released in July 2011. It begins with Childish Gambino in a forest, sitting up with a noose around his neck, then coughing up blood before untying the noose and throwing it off. Looking up, he sees that the noose was tied to a tree branch, and realizes he was lynched. He then wanders through the forest in search for help, and sees a group of people huddled around a campfire while someone appears to be telling them a scary story, and is relieved. It wears off quick when he notices someone approaching the campsite with the noose he previously threw off and a knife in hand, presumably a killer. He begins trying to get their attention and sprints towards the campers, finding a small knife in the process, and gets there before the killer does, and tries warning the campers, but neither them nor the storyteller can see him, and it is then revealed the 'killer' was simply playing a joke on all of them. Gambino then falls to the ground, landing in the same place he was when the video began, and the video ends.

== Certifications ==
| Region | Certification | Certified units/sales |
|---|---|---|
| Australia (ARIA) | Platinum | 70,000^{‡} |
| New Zealand (RMNZ) | Platinum | 30,000^{‡} |
| United Kingdom (BPI) | Gold | 400,000^{‡} |
| United States (RIAA) | Gold | 500,000^{‡} |
^{‡} Sales+streaming figures based on certification alone.
