= Jesús Pat Chablé =

Pat Boy
- Also known as: Pat Boy Rap Maya; Pat Boy
- Born: Jesús Christobal Pat Chablé; December 24, 1991 (age 34)
- Origin: Pino Suarez, Felipe Carrillo Puerto, QR, Mexico
- Genres: World; hip hop; reggae
- Occupations: Singer; rapper

Jesús Pat Chablé (born 24 December 1991), commonly known by his stage name Pat Boy Rap Maya or Pat Boy, is a Mexican singer and rapper who is Maya and often raps in the Yucatec Maya language. Pat Boy is regarded as one of the leaders of Maya-language rap in Mexico. He is one of the founders and producers of ADN Maya films, a record label for other Maya-language musicians and artists.

== Early life ==
Pat Boy was born in a small village of Pino Suarez in the municipality of Felipe Carrillo Puerto. He grew up speaking Maya as his first language although he started exploring his indigenous past only when he became older. He is descended from Jacinto Pat, a rebel leader during the Caste War of Yucatán. Growing up, Pat Boy often listened to rap CDs brought home by his older brother. However, he got tired of listening to English and Spanish music and eventually, along with another young rapper, El Cima Atte, decided to start producing rap songs in Maya in the homemade studio of his friend, Jesús Alejandro Cach.

== Career ==
Pat Boy's first album Mi Primer Paso/In Yáax Xinbaal was released in 2011. It immediately gained attention for its Mayan lyrics, although not all the reactions were positive. Some people considered the usage of the traditional language in rap, vulgar or too rebellious.

Pat Boy's first hit song was called "Sangre Maya" (Maya blood) which he did with El Cima Atte. As of 2013, it is one of the most listened-to indigenous rap songs. Pat Boy and El Cima Atte made several other rap songs together, mostly in Mayan, before the latter's 2014 death from cancer.

In 2017, Pat Boy and singer Yazmín Novelo released the song "Xíimbal Kaaj" (Walkers of the land), which was produced by labels 4 Mayan Seasons and Jabu Studio. The song and the music video were praised for the visuals and upbeat message regarding indigenous identity.

Pat Boy appeared on the 2022 Wakanda Forever soundtrack, performing "Laayli' kuxa'ano'one" with Yaalen K’uj and All Mayan Winiko. The track was played during the credits of the film.

== Influences and themes ==
Pat Boy says that his main motivation is to make people proud of their Maya culture and for the young to not be ashamed of using their language. Most of Pat Boy's songs focus on the struggles and traditions of Maya life. Some songs such as "k´axil ts´íimin" have environmental messages, while other songs such as "La Perlita" have Christian themes.

Pat Boy says that his favorite rappers and influences are 50 Cent, Lil Wayne and Cam'ron.

== Discography ==
- Mi Primer Paso/In Yáax Xinbaal - 2011
- Soy un Máasewáal - 2018
- Raap Ich Máaya - 2019
- Mi Música en Tu Zona - 2024
