= Camp (album) =

2011 studio album by Childish Gambino

Studio album by Childish Gambino
- Released: November 15, 2011
- Studios: Hyperion Sound, Los Angeles, California
- Genre: Hip-hop
- Length: 56:06
- Label: Glassnote
- Producers: Childish Gambino; Ludwig Göransson

Childish Gambino chronology
EP (2011)	Camp (2011)	Royalty (2012)

Singles from Camp
- 1. "Bonfire" Released: September 17, 2011; 2. "Heartbeat" Released: November 15, 2011; 3. "Fire Fly" Released: July 30, 2012

Camp is the debut studio album by American rapper Donald Glover, under his stage name Childish Gambino. It was released on November 15, 2011, by Glassnote Records, releasing four mixtapes and three independent albums, Gambino signed a deal to Glassnote, making Camp his first album on a major record label. The album was co-produced in its entirety by Gambino's longtime collaborator Ludwig Göransson.

Camp received generally positive reviews from critics, debuting at number 11 on the US Billboard 200, selling 52,000 copies in the first week.

== Background ==
On September 6, 2011, Glover signed with Glassnote. The founder Daniel Glass says "There's a tremendous sense of rock'n'roll about him, an irreverence and an authenticity, He fits in with our roster because he's alternative. He liked our approach, which is very touring-intensive. Secondly, it's about how progressive he's been online: inclusive of his fans and very liberal with giving away music. He knows his audience."

In late October, he announced that the album would be released on November 15.

== Release and promotion ==
The album was made available for pre-order on iTunes on November 1, 2011. On the same day, the music video for "Bonfire" was released through Gambino's website and YouTube. The album was made available in its entirety for streaming on NPR on November 6, 2011.

=== Singles ===
The album's lead single, "Bonfire", was debuted on Funkmaster Flex's Hot 97 radio show on September 17, 2011. "Heartbeat" was released as the album's second single on November 15, 2011, and reached 18 on the US Bubbling Under Hot 100 Singles.

On July 24, 2012, the music video for the song, "Fire Fly", was released on Vevo. "Fire Fly" was later serviced to British contemporary hit radio on July 30, 2012.

=== Other songs ===
On January 9, 2013, Gambino released his latest video from Camp, "L.E.S." The song's title is an acronym for the Lower East Side of the New York City borough of Manhattan, the location of the video shoot. Photographer Ibra Ake directed and filmed the video over "several nights" on the streets of the Lower East Side, in front of places like Pianos, and riding in cabs around the district; but not once does Gambino appear himself. While on tour in the summer of 2012, Gambino played this video in the background while he performed "L.E.S." onstage.

== Critical reception ==
Professional ratings
Aggregate scores
Source	Rating
AnyDecentMusic?	6.7/10
Metacritic	69/100
Review scores
Source	Rating
AllMusic	4/5 stars
The A.V. Club	C+
The Guardian	2/5 stars
The Independent	4/5 stars
Mojo	4/5 stars
MSN Music (Expert Witness)	A−
Pitchfork	1.6/10
Q	3/5 stars
Rolling Stone	3/5 stars
Spin	6/10

Camp was met with generally positive reviews. At Metacritic, which assigns a normalized rating out of 100 to reviews from mainstream critics, the album received an average score of 69, based on 27 reviews. Aggregator AnyDecentMusic? gave it 6.7 out of 10, based on their assessment of the critical consensus.

Barry Nicolson of NME dubbed it "the hip-hop album of the year" and commended Gambino's "focus on being [...] witty, heartfelt, honest and occasionally uproarious." Steve Lepore of PopMatters found the album to be "undoubtedly one of the best records of any genre to come out in 2011" and characterized it as "a juxtaposition of mostly depressing, self-loathing rap mixed with some of the most enjoyable post-Graduation music." In his consumer guide for MSN Music, Robert Christgau complimented its "choral and orchestral movie music" and stated, "it's less surefire than Culdesac. But it's more satisfying emotionally, because the autobiography reaches deep". Mojo stated, "The identity-crisis themed Camp trumps through whip-smart intelligence, comic brio and bristling malign intent." AllMusic editor David Jeffries commended Gambino for "taking indie hip-hop to new levels" and called the album "remarkable". Evan Rytlewski of The A.V. Club was more critical, stating "Camp is heavy with themes of racial expectations and cultural ostracism—big ideas that aren't always done justice by Glover's cartoonishly exaggerated, one-liner-laden flow."

Mosi Reeves of Spin found the album to be "a bit of a mess. It veers wildly from poignant emotions to maudlin histrionics, often in the same song." Pitchfork's Ian Cohen stated, "While Glover's exaggerated, cartoonish flow and overblown pop-rap production would be enough to make Camp one of the most uniquely unlikable rap records of this year (and most others), what's worse is how he uses heavy topics like race, masculinity, relationships, street cred, and 'real hip-hop' as props to construct a false outsider persona." Claire Suddath of Time criticized Gambino for "bragging about all of the girls he's banged" too often, but complimented his "catchy, danceable sound very much akin to that of Kanye West" and stated, "Ultimately, Camp is a skillful album created by a conflicted man ... But if Camp doesn't have a motif maybe that's because [he] doesn't have one either. He acts, he writes, he still does stand-up, and yes, he also raps. Some people can't be put into a box that easily."

== Retrospective ==
In a 2022 interview with Interview, Childish Gambino reflected about the album and the reception:

"I like parts of that album and I learned so much. Mostly that concept doesn't outshine content. But when they're in equilibrium, it's extremely potent. I don't think I was clear on that album, and the songs weren't catchy enough for me. Made it feel like novelty. Because I wouldn't bop any of the songs in the car now. Maybe a couple of the hooks."

== Commercial performance ==
Camp debuted at number 11 on the US Billboard 200, selling 52,000 copies in the first week. As of November 2013, the album has sold 242,000 copies in the United States according to Nielsen SoundScan.

== Track listing ==
All tracks were written and produced by Donald Glover and Ludwig Göransson.

Camp track listing
No.	Title	Length
1.	"Outside"	4:30
2.	"Fire Fly"	3:24
3.	"Bonfire"	3:13
4.	"All the Shine"	5:46
5.	"Letter Home"	1:44
6.	"Heartbeat"	4:31
7.	"Backpackers"	3:16
8.	"L.E.S."	5:19
9.	"Hold You Down"	4:53
10.	"Kids (Keep Up)"	4:57
11.	"You See Me"	3:15
12.	"Sunrise"	3:40
13.	"That Power"	7:38

Deluxe edition (bonus tracks)
No.	Title	Length
14.	"Freaks and Geeks"	3:39
15.	"Not Going Back"	4:42
16.	"Heartbeat" (Treasure Fingers Remix)	5:31
17.	"Heartbeat" (Oliver Remix)	4:32

Camp Side D (bonus tracks)
No.	Title	Length
14.	"Freaks and Geeks"	3:39
15.	"My Shine"	3:29
16.	"Not Going Back"	4:40
17.	"Longest Text Message"	3:47

iTunes bonus track
No.	Title	Length
18.	"Heartbeat" (Cole Medina Remix)	6:54

== Personnel ==
- Donald Glover – design, drum programming, producer, programming, string arrangements, vocals
- Ludwig Göransson – drum programming, engineer, guitar, keyboards, producer, programming
- Erik Arvinder – string arrangements, violin
- Bryan Carrigan – engineer
- Thomas Drayton – bass
- Chris Fogel – mixing
- Shepard – drum programming, guitar, producer
- Janet Leon – vocals ("Fire Fly")
- Dean – vocals ("Sunrise")
- Beldina Malaika – vocals ("Not Going Back")
- Ryan McClure – engineer, mixing
- Vlado Meller – mastering
- Questlove – drums
- Whitney Wood – choir, chorus, soloist
- Chris Scully – art direction, layout
- Ibra Ake – photography

== Charts ==
=== Weekly charts ===
Chart performance for Camp
Chart (2011–2013)	Peak position
Australian Albums (ARIA)	99
Australian Urban Albums (ARIA)	19
Canadian Albums (Billboard)	22
UK R&B Albums (Official Charts)	29
US Billboard 200	11
US Top R&B/Hip-Hop Albums (Billboard)	2

=== Year-end charts ===
2012 year-end chart performance for Camp
Chart (2012)	Position
US Billboard 200	189
US Top R&B/Hip-Hop Albums (Billboard)	29

== Certifications ==
Certifications for Camp
Region	Certification	Certified units/sales
United Kingdom (BPI)	Gold	100,000^{‡}
^{‡} Sales+streaming figures based on certification alone.
