= Royalty (mixtape) =

Mixtape by Childish Gambino
- Released: July 4, 2012
- Recorded: 2012
- Genre: Hip hop
- Length: 59:19
- Label: Glassnote
- Producers: Childish Gambino (also exec.); Beck; Blake Griffin; Bloodshy & Avant; Boi-1da; Jordan Evans; Kavinsky; Ludwig Göransson; The Maven Boys; Matthew Burnett; Myke Murda; Skywlkr

Childish Gambino chronology
Camp (2011)	Royalty (2012)	Because the Internet (2013)

Childish Gambino mixtape chronology
Culdesac (2010)	Royalty (2012)	STN MTN (2014)

Royalty (stylized as R O Y A L T Y) is the sixth mixtape by American rapper and actor Donald Glover, under the stage name Childish Gambino. It was released by Glassnote Records on July 4, 2012. The album has many featured artists and is produced by Glover and his co-producer Ludwig Göransson, as well as Beck, Boi-1da and Skywlkr.

== Background ==
Although released on July 4, 2012, Glover announced the mixtape in January. After the announcement, there were various releases by Glover, including "Fuck Your Blog," that were not on the mixtape. Two other songs released since Royalty's announcement that are not included are "Eat Your Vegetables", released on April 2 through his website, and "Tell Me" featuring Himanshu Suri, better known as Heems of Das Racist, on the radio show "Chillin' Island". "Tell Me" was later released on Suri's mixtape Wild Water Kingdom.

Glover has stated that he had recorded 25 songs for the mixtape. On May 14, Funkmaster Flex premiered "Unnecessary", featuring Schoolboy Q and Ab-Soul. On May 16, Glover released "We Ain't Them", produced by himself and frequent collaborator Ludwig. On May 26, Glover released another track, "Black Faces", through his website, featuring Nipsey Hussle and produced by Boi-1da. On May 30, he released a third track through his website which he named "Silk Pillow" (via his Twitter account), featuring Beck and produced by both Glover and Beck.

On July 3, 2012, Glover released the cover of the mixtape via Instagram and his Twitter account. The same day he released the track list via Twitter.

== Critical reception ==
Consequence of Sound's Chris Coplan gave the mixtape three out of five stars and found it "light on the punch lines, heavy on the swag, and an overall mighty declaration of newfound skill and confidence despite a few missteps" such as "lazy sing-talking". Corban Goble of Stereogum complimented the guest rappers and observed "a surprising amount of quality and variety for a free mixtape." Giving it a score of 8.3 out of 10, Adam Vitcavage of Paste praised Gambino's wordplay and cited the mixtape as "easily his most ambitious and controversial [release] yet." Although he felt it lacks the "sincerity and unique nature of Camp", Jason Gardner of AbsolutePunk rated the mixtape a 78% and wrote that "the rough and tumble beats and much less punchline-glazed lyricism make this mixtape a worthwhile experience both for creator and listener."

== Track listing ==
No.	Title	Writer(s)	Producer(s)	Length
1.	"Royalty"			0:09
2.	"We Ain't Them"	Donald Glover; Ludwig Göransson	Childish Gambino; Göransson	3:13
3.	"One Up" (featuring Steve G. Lover III)	Glover; Stephen Glover	Childish Gambino	2:31
4.	"Black Faces" (featuring Nipsey Hussle)	Glover; Ermias Asghedom; Matthew Samuels; Zale Epstein; Brett Kruger	Boi-1da; The Maven Boys	3:29
5.	"Unnecessary" (featuring Schoolboy Q and Ab-Soul)	Glover; Quincy Hanley; Herbert Stevens IV	Childish Gambino	3:41
6.	"Shoulda Known"	Glover	Childish Gambino	4:27
7.	"R.I.P" (featuring Bun B)	Glover; Bernard Freeman; Vincent Belorgey	Kavinsky; Childish Gambino	3:54
8.	"American Royalty" (featuring RZA and Hypnotic Brass Ensemble)	Glover; Robert Diggs	Childish Gambino	3:34
9.	"It May Be Glamour Life" (featuring Ghostface Killah)	Glover; Dennis Coles; Myke Stallone	Myke Murda	1:36
10.	"Toxic" (featuring Danny Brown)	Glover; Daniel Sewell; Skylar Tait; Christian Karlsson; Pontus Winnberg	Skywlkr; Bloodshy & Avant	2:48
11.	"Silk Pillow" (featuring Beck)	Glover; Beck Hansen	Beck; Childish Gambino	4:10
12.	"They Don't Like Me" (featuring Chance the Rapper)	Glover; Chancelor Bennett; Tait	Skywlkr	2:14
13.	"Arrangement" (featuring Gonage)	Glover; Göransson	Childish Gambino	4:34
14.	"Won't Stop" (featuring Danielle Haim)	Glover; Danielle Haim; Göransson	Childish Gambino; Göransson	3:07
15.	"Bronchitis"	Glover; Hansen	Beck	3:02
16.	"Wonderful" (featuring Josh Osho)	Glover; Josh Osho; Samuels; Jordan Evans; Matthew Burnett	Boi-1da; Evans^{[b]}; Burnett^{[b]}	2:34
17.	"Make It Go Right" (featuring Kilo Kish)	Glover; Lakisha Robinson	Childish Gambino	4:24
18.	"Real Estate" (featuring Alley Boy, Jo Swank, and Tina Fey)	Glover; Curt Freeman; Jo Swank; Elizabeth Fey	Childish Gambino	5:52

Notes

- ^{^[b]} signifies a co-producer.
