= Heartbeat (Childish Gambino song) =

2011 single by Childish Gambino

Single by Childish Gambino

from the album Camp
- Released: November 15, 2011
- Recorded: 2011
- Genre: Hip house
- Length: 4:31
- Label: Glassnote; Universal
- Songwriters: Donald Glover; Ludwig Göransson
- Producers: Childish Gambino; Göransson

Childish Gambino singles chronology
"Bonfire" (2011)	"Heartbeat" (2011)	"Fire Fly" (2012)

Music video
- "Heartbeat" on YouTube

"Heartbeat" is a song by American rapper Childish Gambino. It was released on November 15, 2011, by Glassnote Records as the second single from his debut studio album, Camp (2011). The song was written and produced by Gambino himself along with Ludwig Göransson.

== Background ==
Composer Ludwig Göransson worked on both the album Camp and the single. Göransson worked on the television show Community, in which Gambino stars as the main character, Troy Barnes. Gambino said in an interview with Hard Knock TV that part of the last verse on "Heartbeat" was his favorite yet.

== Composition ==
The song uses an electro beat "equipped with pulsating drums and buzzing synth chords". The lyrics deal with themes of breakup, love and sex.

== Critical reception ==
Katie Antonsson published an article called "Best of the B Sides: "Heartbeat", on a website called RockOnPhilly. She added her own perspective to Childish Gambino's hit single:

So, to "Heartbeat." It's the second single of the album (I know! I'm sorry! I just have to talk about this song!) and it's the most intoxicating song Glover's come out with. From the echoey beginning and the solemn piano refrain in the beginning to the stunning drop about 45 seconds in, "Heartbeat" is immediately something unexplored. It has a lot of the feeling and tone of Kanye's "Heartless" from 808s & Heartbreak but we get the rap element that Kanye stayed away from on 808s (808s was an entirely autotuned, melodic album from Kanye. There wasn't an inch of rap on it). Plus the drop in the beginning is mesmerizing. It's not just that the bass is dropped, it's how the bass is dropped. It's elongated, whining bass notes that just drape themselves throughout the song. In fact, everything about the song is really smooth except for Glover's razor-sharp rapping, making that factor all the more delightful.

Glover's got good speed on "Heartbeat" that he doesn't demonstrate as much through the rest of the album. But these rhymes are lightning fast, and what's so thrilling about them is how smart, witty, and ironic they are. This song takes several listens to fully grasp the nuances in the lyrics. They're emotionally charged and delivered with enough force that even if half of the lines stand out to a first-time listener, the feeling Glover's trying to capture is so clear.

Camp is an amazing album, truth be told. It's alarming, unexpected, and sort of uncomfortable to listen to. Glover really speaks his truth on Camp, whether it's the literal truth in his words or a more figurative truth through the way he says them. "Heartbeat" is the highlight of the album, by far, but even in the opening song "Outside," it's easy to get a feeling for Glover's angst and anxiety. It's artfully done.

On November 8, 2013, "Heartbeat" was rated as the third best from Childish Gambino on the Sunset in the Rearview site.

== Music video ==
On February 10, 2012, the music video for "Heartbeat" was added on Childish Gambino's VEVO account on YouTube. It was directed by Kyle Newacheck, who Gambino had also collaborated with on the TV show Community.

Gambino described the video as a "reflection" of how he was feeling when he wrote the song, saying, "This is kinda like the mood of the song. I wouldn't say it's so much a video as much as it is just a mood." His brother Stephen appears at the beginning of the music video.

== Charts ==
2012 chart performance for "Heartbeat"
Chart (2012)	Peak position
Lithuania (AGATA)	92
UK Singles (The Official Charts Company)	104
UK Hip Hop/R&B (OCC)	29
US Bubbling Under Hot 100 (Billboard)	18
US Hot R&B/Hip-Hop Songs (Billboard)	54

2023 chart performance for "Heartbeat"
Chart (2023)	Peak position
UK Singles (OCC)	97

== Certifications ==
Region	Certification	Certified units/sales
Australia (ARIA)	Platinum	70,000^{‡}
Canada (Music Canada)	Gold	40,000^{*}
Denmark (IFPI Danmark)	Gold	45,000^{‡}
New Zealand (RMNZ)	2× Platinum	60,000^{‡}
United Kingdom (BPI)	Platinum	600,000^{‡}
United States (RIAA)	Platinum	1,000,000^{‡}
^{*} Sales figures based on certification alone.^{‡} Sales+streaming figures based on certification alone.
