= Donald Glover =

American actor and musician (born 1983)

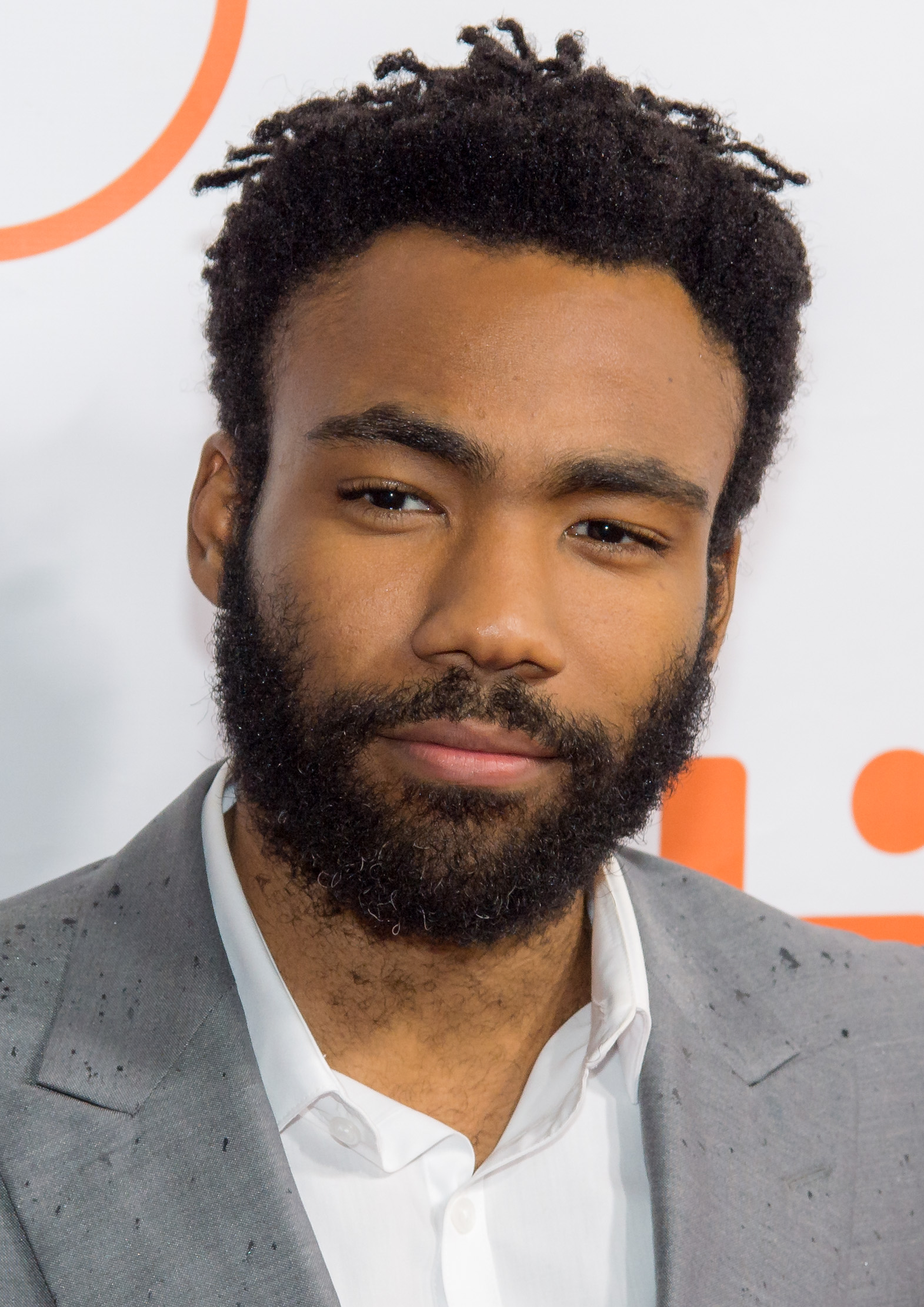
- Glover in 2015
- Born: Donald McKinley Glover Jr. September 25, 1983 (age 43); Edwards Air Force Base, California, U.S.
- Other names: Childish Gambino; mcDJ
- Education: New York University (BFA)
- Occupations: Actor; comedian; rapper; singer; songwriter; filmmaker
- Years active: 2004–present
- Works: Discography; filmography
- Spouse: Michelle White (m. 2024)
- Children: 3
- Relatives: Stephen Glover (brother)
- Awards: Full list

Comedy career
- Medium: Stand-up; television; film; music
- Genres: Observational comedy; surreal humor; black comedy; musical comedy; sketch comedy; satire
- Subjects: African-American culture; current events; everyday life; pop culture; racism; race relations; existentialism; human sexuality
- Musical career
- Origin: Stone Mountain, Georgia, U.S.
- Genres: Alternative hip-hop; funk; PBR&B; soul; psychedelia; indie pop; dark pop
- Instruments: Vocals; drums
- Labels: mcDJ; Wolf+Rothstein; Liberator; RCA; Glassnote
- Website: childishgambino.com

Donald McKinley Glover Jr. (/ˈɡlʌvər/; born September 25, 1983), also known by his musical stage name Childish Gambino (/ɡæmˈbiːnoʊ/), is an American actor, rapper, singer, comedian, and filmmaker. While studying at New York University and after working with the comedy group Derrick Comedy, Glover was hired by Tina Fey at age 23 to write for the NBC sitcom 30 Rock. He gained fame for portraying college student Troy Barnes on the NBC sitcom Community from 2009 to 2014. He created the FX series Atlanta (2016–2022), which he starred in and occasionally directed. For his work on Atlanta, he won various accolades including two Primetime Emmy Awards, as well as two Golden Globe Awards.

Glover has appeared in several films, including the supernatural horror The Lazarus Effect (2015), the comedy-drama Magic Mike XXL (2015), and the science fiction film The Martian (2015). He played Aaron Davis in the superhero film Spider-Man: Homecoming (2017), as well as Lando Calrissian in the space western Solo: A Star Wars Story (2018). He provided the voice of adult Simba in The Lion King (2019), and produced the short film Guava Island (2019), in which he starred. He co-created the comedy thriller television series Swarm (2023). Glover is also credited as a principal inspiration for the creation of the Marvel Comics superhero Miles Morales / Spider-Man, whom Glover himself briefly voiced in the animated series Ultimate Spider-Man. In 2024, he created and starred in the Prime Video series Mr. & Mrs. Smith. In 2026, he starred as the voice of Yoshi in the animated video game film The Super Mario Galaxy Movie.

After a number of independently released projects, Glover signed with Glassnote Records in 2011, and released his debut studio album, Camp, in November of that year to critical and commercial success. His second album, Because the Internet (2013) was supported by the single "3005", which became his first Billboard Hot 100 entry. His psychedelic funk-inspired 2016 single, "Redbone" peaked at number 12 on the chart, won a Grammy Award for Best Traditional R&B Performance, and preceded the release of his third album "Awaken, My Love!" (2016), which saw continued success. Glover's 2018 single, "This Is America" debuted atop the Billboard Hot 100, and won in all of the categories for which it was nominated at the 61st Annual Grammy Awards: Record of the Year, Song of the Year, Best Rap/Sung Performance, and Best Music Video; it won a Guinness World Record as the first hip hop song to win in the first two categories. His fourth album, 3.15.20, was released in 2020. In 2024, he released Atavista, a reworking of 3.15.20, and later his fifth album Bando Stone & the New World.

== Early life ==
Donald McKinley Glover Jr. was born at Edwards Air Force Base in Edwards, California, on September 25, 1983; he grew up in Stone Mountain, Georgia, where his father was stationed. His mother, Beverly, is a retired daycare provider and his father, Donald Glover Sr., was a postal worker. His parents were foster parents for 14 years. Glover was raised as a Jehovah's Witness but is no longer religious. His younger brother, Stephen, later became a writer and producer who collaborates with him. He has a sister named Brianne. In December 2018, Glover disclosed that his father had died.

Donald Glover attended Stephenson High School and DeKalb School of the Arts; he was voted "Most Likely to Write for The Simpsons" in his high school yearbook. In 2006, he graduated from the New York University Tisch School of the Arts with a degree in dramatic writing. While at Tisch, he self-produced the independent mixtape The Younger I Get, which has not been released and has been disowned by Glover for being what he calls the "too-raw ramblings of...a decrepit Drake". He began DJing and producing electronic music under the moniker MC DJ (later as mcDJ) remixing Sufjan Stevens' album Illinois (2005).

== Writing and acting career ==
=== 2006–2010: Community, and "Rising Comedy Star" ===
In 2006, Glover caught the attention of producer David Miner after Glover sent writing samples including a spec script that he had written for The Simpsons. Miner and Tina Fey were impressed by Glover's work and hired him to become a writer for the NBC sitcom 30 Rock. Glover was shocked when he was hired as he didn't think he belonged in a room of seasoned executives. From 2006 to 2009 Glover wrote for 30 Rock, in which he also had occasional appearances. He and his co-writers were presented with the Writers Guild of America Award for Best Comedy Series in 2008 for his work on the third season.

In 2008, he unsuccessfully auditioned to play President Barack Obama on the sketch comedy program Saturday Night Live; the role went to cast member Fred Armisen. While attending NYU, Glover became a member of the sketch comedy group Derrick Comedy, having appeared in their sketches on YouTube since 2006, along with Dominic Dierkes, Meggie McFadden, DC Pierson, and Dan Eckman. The group wrote and starred in a feature-length film, Mystery Team, a comedy about amateur teenage detectives; it premiered at the Sundance Film Festival in 2009. With a limited release, fans requested the film to be shown in their local theaters.

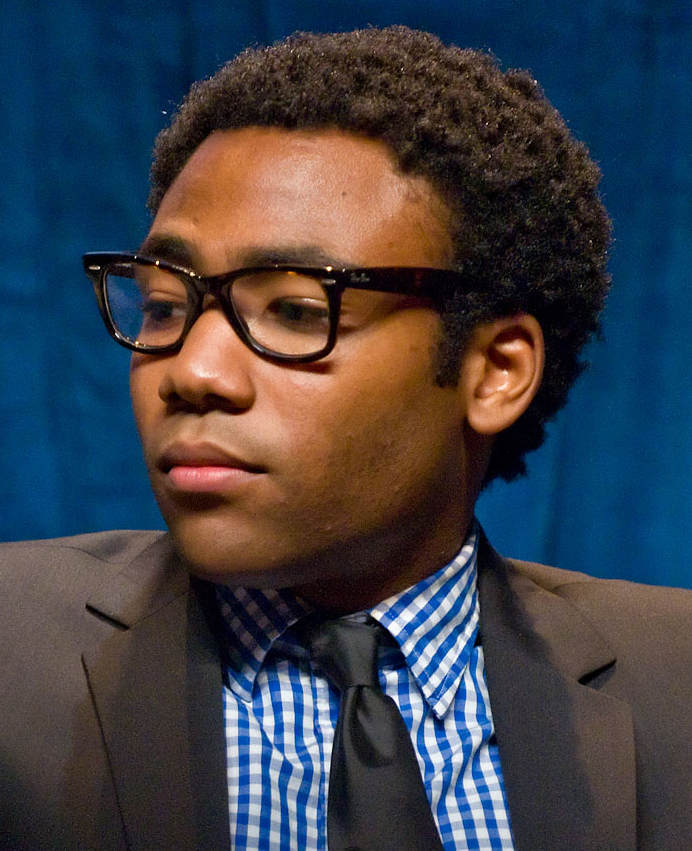
Glover at a panel for Community at PaleyFest 2010

Glover starred as former high school jock Troy Barnes on Dan Harmon's NBC sitcom Community, which premiered in September 2009. He did not return as a full-time cast member for the show's fifth season, appearing only in the first five episodes. Despite speculation that Glover was leaving to pursue his music career, a series of hand-written notes which he posted to Instagram revealed that his reasons were more personal, citing a need for projects that offered him more independence as he worked through some personal issues. Although Harmon approached Glover about returning to the show for its sixth season, Glover declined, feeling that his character's return would not serve the show, the audience, or himself as an actor, and that his career and he himself moved on from the show.

In May 2010, a fan suggested Glover for the role of Spider-Man/Peter Parker in The Amazing Spider-Man film, encouraging his supporters to retweet the hashtag "#donald4spiderman". The campaign sparked a viral response on Twitter. The call for Glover to audition for the role was supported by Spider-Man creator Stan Lee. However, Glover did not audition and the role went to Andrew Garfield. He later revealed that he was never contacted by Sony Pictures. Comics writer Brian Michael Bendis, who announced Miles Morales, an African-American version of Spider-Man a year later, said he had conceived of the character before Glover's campaign went viral. Bendis gave credit to Glover for influencing the new hero's looks for Spider-Man; Bendis said, "I saw him in the costume [on Community] and thought, 'I would like to read that book.'" Glover later voiced this incarnation of Spider-Man on the Ultimate Spider-Man animated series.

Glover received the Rising Comedy Star award at the Just for Laughs festival in July 2010, and was featured in Gap's 2010 holiday advertising campaign.

=== 2013–2017: Atlanta and Spider-Man ===
In 2013, Glover signed a deal to create a music-themed show for FX titled Atlanta, in which he would star, write, and serve as an executive producer. Although several networks were interested in picking up his half-hour comedy, he chose FX due to their willingness to work around his touring schedule. He had a supporting role in the romantic comedy The To Do List (2013), which performed below expectations, and guest starred in two episodes of the comedy-drama television series Girls in early 2013, as a Republican who is the brief love interest to Lena Dunham's character.

After being in development since August 2013, FX ordered the Atlanta series in December 2014, announcing a 10-episode season in October 2015, which premiered on September 6, 2016, to widespread critical acclaim. Glover writes, occasionally directs, executive produces, and stars in the series as Earnest "Earn" Marks, a Princeton dropout who manages his rapper cousin as they navigate through the Atlanta hip hop scene. For his work on the show, Glover has earned various accolades, including Golden Globe Awards for Best Television Series – Musical or Comedy and Best Actor – Television Series Musical or Comedy (becoming the fifth black person in Golden Globe history to win in the category) as well as Primetime Emmy Awards for Outstanding Lead Actor in a Comedy Series and Outstanding Directing for a Comedy Series, making him the first black person to win an Emmy for the latter category. Due to the success of the series, FX signed Glover to an exclusive deal to write and produce more shows for the network. The first of these shows was an animated series featuring the Marvel Comics character Deadpool, which was set to premiere in 2018 but was later canceled due to creative differences. Glover later posted an unofficial and unproduced script to his Twitter account commenting that he was not "too busy to work on Deadpool", ending media speculation.

Glover appeared in three films in 2015. In The Lazarus Effect, he played a scientist working with a team of researchers who bring dead people back to life with disastrous consequences. Next, Glover played a singer in the comedy-drama Magic Mike XXL and performed a cover of the Bruno Mars song "Marry You" in the film, which was included in the soundtrack. His third release that year was Ridley Scott's science fiction adaptation The Martian, featuring Glover as a Jet Propulsion Laboratory astrodynamicist who helps rescue an astronaut, played by Matt Damon, stranded on Mars.

In April 2017, Time named Glover in its annual "100 Most Influential People in the World". Tina Fey wrote the entry for Glover; she remarked that he "embodies his generation's belief that people can be whatever they want and change what it is they want, at any time". Later that year, Glover appeared as criminal Aaron Davis in the superhero film Spider-Man: Homecoming (2017). Davis is the uncle of the Miles Morales version of Spider-Man, whom Glover had voiced in the Ultimate Spider-Man animated series. The casting was described as "a surprise treat for fans" by the film's director Jon Watts, aware of his 2010 campaign to portray the superhero. He would later reprise this role in a live-action cameo in Spider-Man: Across the Spider-Verse (2023).

=== 2018–2019: Star Wars, Lion King, and Atlanta second season ===
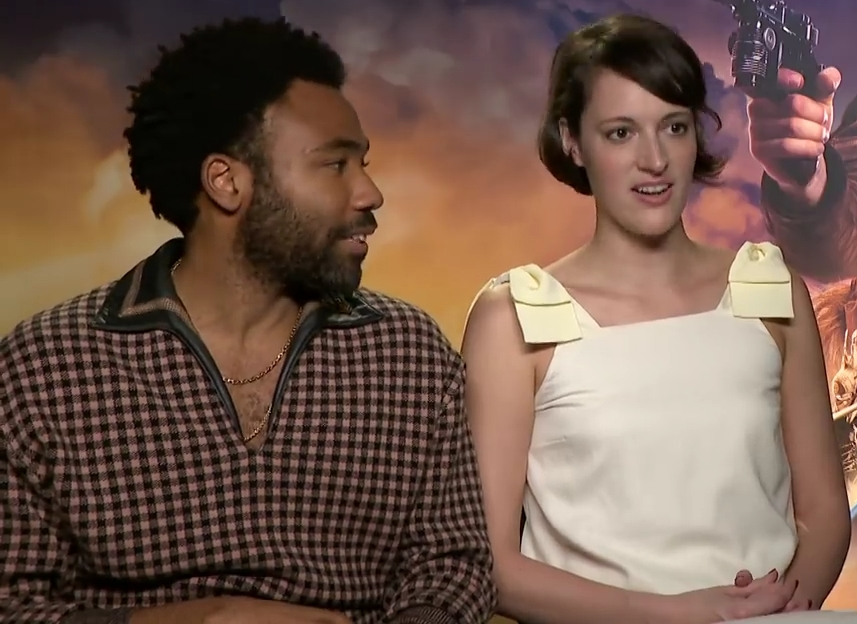
Glover (left) promoting Solo with Phoebe Waller-Bridge in 2018

While filming Atlanta's second season, Glover portrayed a young version of Lando Calrissian in Solo: A Star Wars Story (2018), causing him to miss appearances in some episodes; Calrissian was previously played by Billy Dee Williams in two films in the original Star Wars trilogy. Despite the film's turbulent production and poor box office returns, Glover's performance was praised, particularly by critic Stephanie Zacharek for his "unruly, charismatic elegance".

In February 2018, Glover approached New Regency, without a script, about a project he wanted to work on while he had free time between Solo promotional duties and his This Is America Tour. Due to his previous success, they accepted his offer quickly and Amazon Studios agreed to distribute the film. Guava Island, the resulting film written by Stephen Glover and directed by Hiro Murai, was filmed in Cuba. It stars Glover as a musician who decides to throw a festival on his homeland, with Rihanna co-starring as his partner and muse. It was released in 2019 through Amazon Prime Video to generally favorable critical appraisal after premiering at Coachella. Glover provided guest vocals to the track "Monster" on 21 Savage's 2018 album I Am > I Was, reflecting on his negative feelings toward the music industry and why he wants to retire from music. He partnered with Adidas Originals to reimagine three pairs of classic Adidas sneakers, which were launched in April 2019 under the "Donald Glover Presents" line and were promoted by a series of advertisements starring comedian Mo'Nique.

Glover provided the voice for adult Simba, the titular protagonist and lion prince turned king in The Lion King (2019), a remake of the 1994 Disney film of the same name. Glover praised the director, Jon Favreau, for the way he constructed the timeless story and asked him to re-record his lines as he connected to the film's story line more personally after his father's death. Glover sang on the film's soundtrack and on the curated album The Lion King: The Gift, featuring songs inspired by the film. Although it received mixed reviews, the film grossed $1.6 billion worldwide, making it one of the highest-grossing films of all time.

=== 2021–present ===
In 2021, Glover signed an overall deal with Amazon Studios. It was announced that he would be producing and starring in a television reboot of Doug Liman's 2005 film Mr. & Mrs. Smith, with Maya Erskine co-starring. In April 2021, Glover tweeted that he was in the midst of writing a trilogy of feature films. In February 2022, both seasons 3 and 4 of Atlanta had completed filming, with season 3 premiering on March 24, 2022, and the final season on September 15, 2022. In March 2022, Glover announced that he was working on a Disney+ Star Wars series based on Lando Calrissian.

In December 2022, it was announced that Glover would star and produce a feature set in Sony Pictures' Spider-Man universe. The film currently has no title but is said to revolve around the Hypno-Hustler. He is also the creator of the television series Swarm, starring Dominique Fishback, Damson Idris, and Chloe Bailey. Serving as a director and executive producer on the show, the series is the first project from his deal with Amazon Studios.

In an October 2022 interview with Variety, Community creator Dan Harmon said that he believes Glover would be in the upcoming Sony Pictures and Peacock produced Community film. "I think that Donald is coming, based on word of mouth, but it's just the deal isn't official or wasn't official. It would be difficult to really commit to doing this thing without Donald," Harmon said. "So I believe he is coming back." In April 2023, Glover confirmed he would be returning for the Community movie.

In July 2023, it was announced that Glover and his brother Stephen would replace Justin Simien as the head writers of the upcoming Star Wars series Lando. On January 8, 2024, it was announced Donald Glover would star in the biopic of British-American rap artist 21 Savage, titled American Dream: The 21 Savage Story, alongside Stranger Things star Caleb McLaughlin and Savage; Glover was expected to play 21 Savage. On January 24, Savage revealed that the biopic's announcement was actually a "parody", though he noted that "it could be [a real movie] one day". Glover voiced Yoshi in The Super Mario Galaxy Movie, released on April 1, 2026. The day before the movie released, Glover appeared at Dodger Stadium to throw a ceremonial first pitch to Yoshinobu Yamamoto before the Los Angeles Dodgers battled the Cleveland Guardians in front of a life sized version of Yoshi.

== Music career (as Childish Gambino) ==
=== Early career ===
Glover's stage name, Childish Gambino, which he used to start his musical career, comes from a Wu-Tang Clan name generator. In June 2008, he released the independent mixtape Sick Boi. In September 2009, he released his second mixtape Poindexter. A pair of mixtapes titled I Am Just a Rapper and I Am Just A Rapper 2, were released in close succession in 2010, and Culdesac, his third mixtape, was released in July of that year. In March 2010, Glover performed a 30-minute set on the stand-up showcase program Comedy Central Presents.

=== 2011–2012: EP and Camp ===
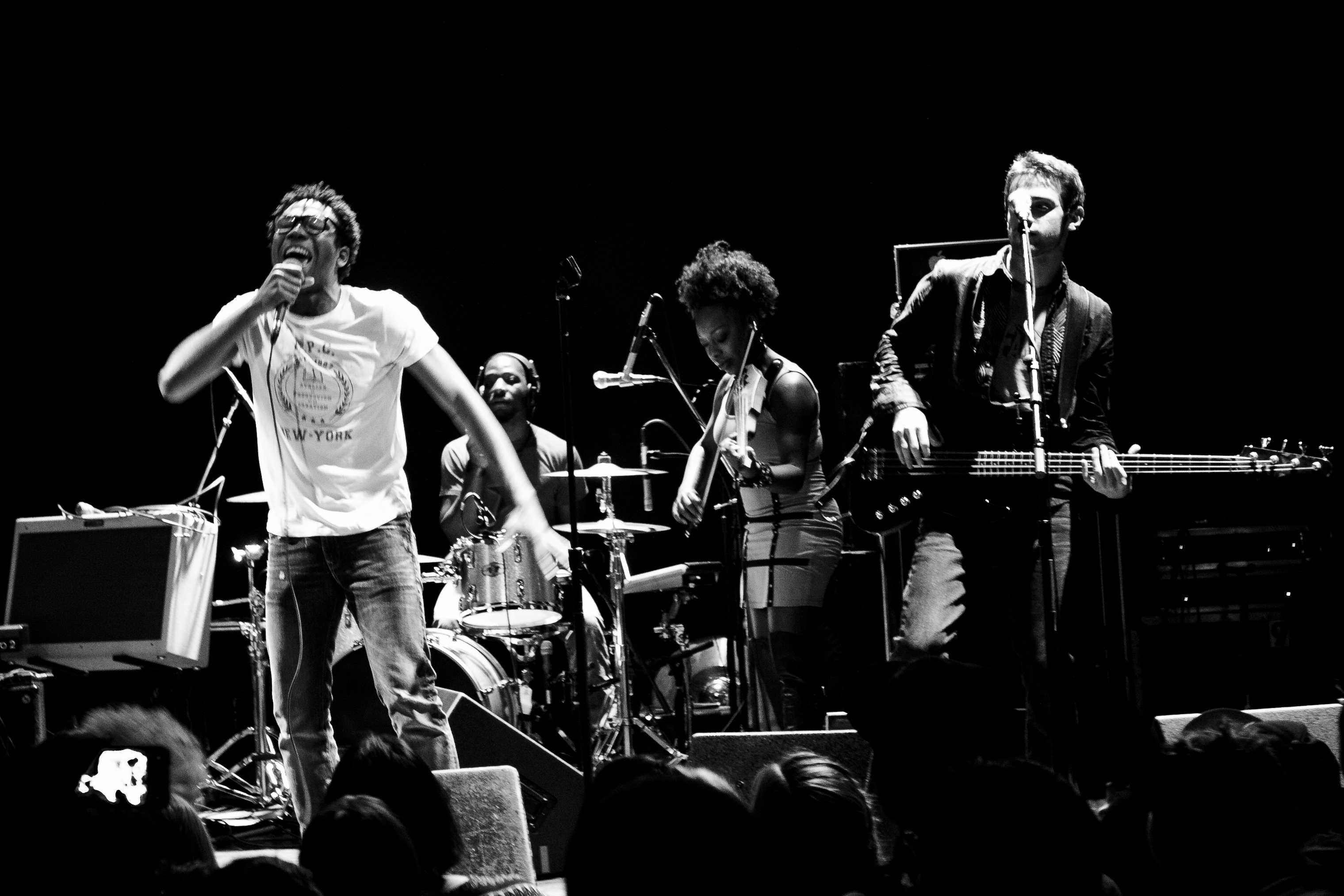
Glover performing as Childish Gambino at the Bowery Ballroom in New York City in 2010

His first extended play, titled EP, was released as a free digital download in March 2011. A music video for the song "Freaks and Geeks" was released in that month and Glover hosted the MTVU Woodie Awards at South By Southwest. Glover commenced his nationwide IAMDONALD Tour in April. The tour was a one-man live show that consisted of rap, comedy, and video segments. He appeared at the 2011 Bonnaroo Music Festival as both Childish Gambino and as a comedian, performing a set with Bill Bailey. His one-hour stand-up special, Weirdo, aired on Comedy Central in November 2011.

For his 2011 debut studio album, Glover approached Community's score composer, Ludwig Göransson for production assistance; Göransson has become his most frequent collaborator. Prior to its release, Glover signed with Glassnote Records and embarked on The Sign-Up Tour. The album titled Camp was released on November 15, 2011, backed by his debut single "Bonfire" and "Heartbeat", which peaked at number eighteen on the Bubbling Under Hot 100 Singles and number fifty-four on Hot R&B/Hip-Hop Songs. Camp debuted at number eleven on the Billboard 200, selling 52,000 copies in the first week, and was generally well received by critics, with PopMatters writer Steve Lepore finding it to be "undoubtedly one of the best records of any genre to come out in 2011". His Camp Gambino tour was scheduled to commence in March 2012, but was postponed to April after he fractured his foot.

=== 2012–2014: Royalty, Because the Internet and STN MTN/Kauai ===
Glover released the songs "Eat Your Vegetables" and "Fuck Your Blog" through his website in April and May 2012. Throughout May and June, he premiered tracks from his sixth mixtape, Royalty, which was released as a free digital download in July. The album featured several artists, including his brother Stephen, under the alias Steve G. Lover III. The single "Trouble" by British artist Leona Lewis from her album Glassheart (2012) featured Gambino with a guest rap performance. The song peaked at number seven on the UK Singles Chart, making it his first UK Top 10 single. In November 2012, Göransson said that he and Glover were in the studio generating new ideas for the next album which was to be "bigger" and "with more people involved".

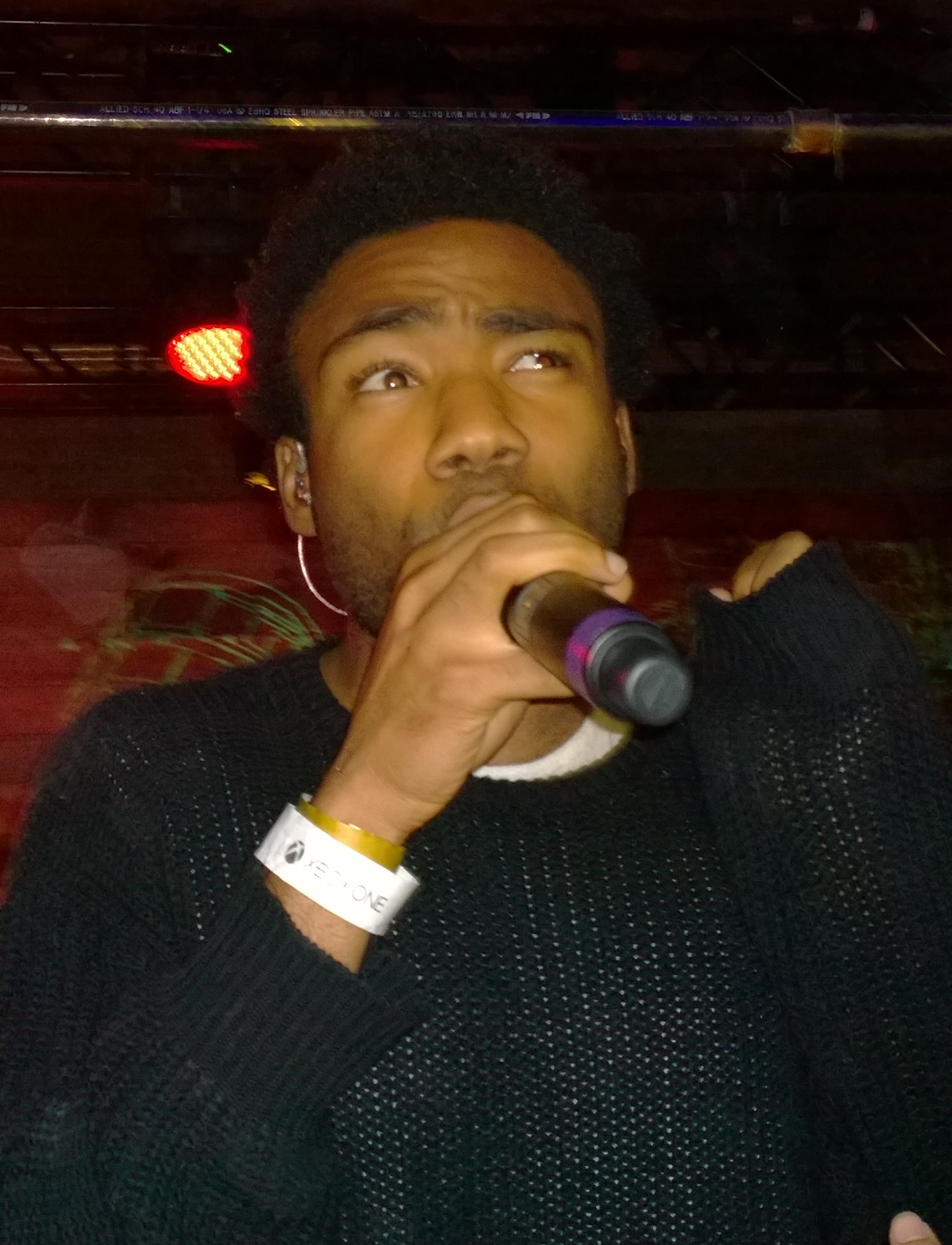
Glover performing as Childish Gambino at South by Southwest in 2014

His second studio album, Because the Internet, finished recording in October 2013 and was released in December, debuting at number seven on the Billboard 200 chart. Because the Internet yielded the singles "3005", "Crawl" and "Sweatpants". "3005" peaked at number eight on the UK R&B Chart and sixty-four on the Billboard Hot 100. To promote the album, Glover wrote a short film Clapping for the Wrong Reasons in which he stars; Chance the Rapper, and Danielle Fishel also star. Directed by Hiro Murai, it was released prior to the album's release and serves as its prelude. Additionally, a 72-page screenplay designed to sync with the album was also released. The Recording Industry Association of America (RIAA) certified "Heartbeat" Gold for shipping 500,000 copies in June 2014–making it Glover's first Gold certification. Because The Internet was also certified Gold. From February to May 2014, he embarked on The Deep Web Tour.

Glover directed the music video for the song "The Pressure" by Jhené Aiko; he appeared in her previous single, "Bed Peace". On October 2, 2014, he released a mixtape titled STN MTN and the next day an EP titled Kauai spawning the single "Sober". STN MTN was a free download; the proceeds of Kauai went to law enforcement policies as well as the maintenance and preservation of Kauai island. Glover described them as a joint project and the "first concept mixtape ever" which continues the story told in Camp and Because the Internet. At the 57th Annual Grammy Awards, he received his first Grammy nominations in Best Rap Album for Because the Internet and Best Rap Performance for "3005".

=== 2015–2018: Awaken, My Love and Creed soundtrack ===
Glover contributed to the soundtrack of Creed (2015), a film in the Rocky film series, providing vocals to the song "Waiting For My Moment" and co-writing another titled "Breathe".

In September 2016, Glover held three musical performances, known as the "Pharos Experience", in Joshua Tree, California, where he debuted songs from his third studio album "Awaken, My Love!". The album was released in December; it reached number five on the Billboard 200 and was later certified platinum accumulating 1,000,000 certified units. It was considered a bold departure from his usual hip hop style as it primarily featured Glover singing rather than rapping, and saw him draw influences from psychedelic soul, funk and R&B music, particularly of the funk band Funkadelic. "Awaken, My Love!" produced the singles "Me and Your Mama", "Redbone" (which peaked at number twelve on the Billboard Hot 100), and "Terrified". Its vinyl release featured a virtual reality headset and an accompanying app that allowed owners to access virtual reality live performances from the Pharos Experience. The album was positively received by music critics and was nominated for both the 2018 Grammy Award for Album of the Year and Best Urban Contemporary Album, while "Redbone" won Best Traditional R&B Performance and received nominations for Record of the Year and Best R&B Song. Glover performed "Terrified" at the award show's 60th ceremony.

=== 2018–2019: "This Is America" ===
In June 2017, Glover announced his intention to retire the Childish Gambino stage name after his next album, telling the audience at Governors Ball Music Festival, "I'll see you for the last Gambino album" before walking off stage. He further explained his decision in an interview, feeling his musical career was no longer "necessary" and added "There's nothing worse than like a third sequel" and "I like it when something's good and when it comes back there's a reason to come back, there's a reason to do that."

Glover signed with RCA Records in January 2018, which Glover called "a necessary change of pace". In May 2018, he released a single titled "This Is America" while performing as both host and musical guest on Saturday Night Live. The song debuted at number one, becoming both Glover's first number one and top ten single in the United States. It features him singing and rapping, drawing influence from trap music. The lyrics addressed a variety of topics including gun violence and being black in the United States, while its controversial video, directed by Japanese-American filmmaker and frequent collaborator Hiro Murai, showed Glover with a firearm shooting at a choir. "This is America" won the Grammy for Song of the Year, Best Music Video, Best Rap/Sung Performance, and Record of the Year, becoming the first rap song to win the latter.

In July 2018, Glover released the Summer Pack extended play containing the songs "Summertime Magic" and "Feels Like Summer", the former of which was originally meant to be the lead single from Glover's forthcoming fourth studio album. "Summertime Magic" debuted at forty-four on the Billboard Hot 100. Glover began his fifth concert tour, This Is America Tour in September, announcing it would be his last during its opening show in Atlanta. Two previously unreleased songs, "Algorhythm" and "All Night", were made available to people who bought tickets to the tour.

Days after headlining Coachella in April 2019, Glover premiered a new song, "Algorythm", through the mobile app Pharos AR. The augmented reality application allows users to open the virtual Pharos world with other players. During his headlining performance at the 2019 Outside Lands Music and Arts Festival, Glover drew "the biggest crowd that Outside Lands has ever had" and also announced that it was "the second to last show that we'll be doing" before retiring the Childish Gambino pseudonym. When asked on Jimmy Kimmel Live! about the status of retiring, Glover said he was unsure and may continue to perform after the This Is America Tour. Glover was expected to release another album per the RCA Records contract he signed in January 2018.

=== 2020: Surprise fourth album ===
On March 15, 2020, Glover streamed his surprise fourth album on his website Donald Glover Presents, where it played on a loop for twelve hours until it was taken down. 21 Savage and Ariana Grande feature on the album. The album was released on digital services the following week under the name 3.15.20. It was well received by music critics and debuted at number 13 on the Billboard 200. In November 2020, in a rare appearance on his Twitter account, Glover opined that seasons 3 and 4 of Atlanta would be on the caliber of The Sopranos and that his next musical project would be his "biggest by far".

=== 2024–present: Name change, Atavista, Bando Stone & the New World soundtrack ===
In April 2024, during a radio stream by Glover's production company GILGA, Glover revealed plans to re-release 3.15.20 as a "finished" album called Atavista, as well as announcing the existence of a new album. Glover said the latter would be the final Childish Gambino album and would act as a soundtrack to an upcoming film called Bando Stone & the New World. Later in the month, Glover previewed a track featuring a Kanye West verse on his Gilga Radio show.

On May 13, 2024, Glover released Atavista. Glover announced The New World Tour in support of both albums in July 2024 and released the soundtrack to Bando Stone & the New World later that month. In an interview with The New York Times during the release of Bando Stone & the New World, he explained the retirement of the Childish Gambino moniker was due to the logistics of making albums with his film, television and family obligations as well as working on the creative incubator, Gilga.

On October 4, 2024, Glover announced on Twitter that he had cancelled the remaining shows for The New World Tour due to surgery and recovery after experiencing a stroke following the New Orleans concert. He featured on the song "Damn Right" from Jennie's 2025 debut solo album Ruby, alongside Kali Uchis.

In March 2026, Glover said he still made music and would release new material "if I can make something that I'm like, 'Oh, people should hear this.'"

== Influences ==
In an interview with The Guardian, Glover stated, "I'm influenced by LCD Soundsystem as much as Ghostface Killah. A lot of the rap shows I saw as a kid were boring, but if you went to a Rage Against the Machine show or a Justice show, the kids were losing their minds. Kids just want to go nuts, Odd Future know that. People want to experience something physical." He also cites hip-hop duo Outkast and trio Migos, and funk band Funkadelic as being influences.

Glover has influenced a number of younger musicians and actors. Rapper Vince Staples has praised Glover's ability to "[do] something different every time".

== Personal life ==
Glover began dating Michelle White in 2015; they married in January 2024, during the production of Mr. & Mrs. Smith, with Glover going to the production immediately after. They have three sons, born in early 2016, 2018, and 2020.

Glover has implied that he is spiritual but not religious. In December 2019, he endorsed 2020 Democratic candidate Andrew Yang and joined his campaign as a creative consultant.

Glover is known as a private person and rarely posts on social media or does interviews unless for promotional work. In an interview with The New Yorker, he said that social media made him feel "less human" and that he only visits online discussion pages in which he can stay anonymous and communicate with people who understand what he is saying.

Glover had a stroke following a 2024 concert in New Orleans, which led him to postpone and then cancel his remaining tour dates and undergo surgery to fix a hole in his heart. He revealed this at his next public appearance, performing at Camp Flog Gnaw Carnival in November 2025.

== Filmography ==
=== Film ===
Year	Title	Role	Notes
2009	Mystery Team	Jason Rogers	
2011	The Muppets	Junior CDE Executive	Cameo
2013	The To Do List	Derrick	
2013	Clapping for the Wrong Reasons	The Boy	Short film
2014	Alexander and the Terrible, Horrible, No Good, Very Bad Day	Greg	
2015	The Lazarus Effect	Niko	
2015	Magic Mike XXL	Andre	
2015	The Martian	Rich Purnell	
2017	Spider-Man: Homecoming	Aaron Davis	
2018	Solo: A Star Wars Story	Lando Calrissian	
2019	Guava Island	Deni Maroon	
2019	The Lion King	Adult Simba	Voice role
2019	Men in Black: International	Himself	Uncredited cameo
2023	Spider-Man: Across the Spider-Verse	Aaron Davis / Prowler	Live-action cameo
2024	Mufasa: The Lion King	Simba	Voice role
2026	The Super Mario Galaxy Movie	Yoshi	Voice role
TBA	Bando Stone & the New World	Bando Stone	

=== Other crew positions ===
Year	Title	Director	Writer	Producer	Soundtrack	Notes
2009	Mystery Team	No	Yes	Executive	Yes	
2013	Clapping for the Wrong Reasons	No	Yes	Executive	No	Short film
2019	Guava Island	No	Story	Yes	Yes	As performer and lyricist
TBA	Bando Stone & the New World	Yes	No	No	Yes	

=== Television ===
Year	Title	Actor	Writer	Executive producer	Director	Role	Notes
2005	Late Night with Conan O'Brien	Yes	No	No	No	Various	2 episodes
2006–2012	30 Rock	Yes	Yes	No	No	Various	4 episodes as actor 22 episodes as an executive story editor and wrote episode: "Episode 210"; credited as Donald Glover II"
2007	Human Giant	Yes	No	No	No	College Webcam Guy	Episode: "24 Hour Marathon"
2009	Live at Gotham	Yes	Yes	No	No	Himself	Episode: "4.6"
2009–2014	Community	Yes	No	No	No	Troy Barnes	89 episodes
2010	Robot Chicken	Yes	No	No	No	Mace Windu	Voice; Episode: "Robot Chicken: Star Wars Episode III"
2010	Comedy Central Presents	Yes	Yes	No	No	Himself	Stand-up special
2011	Regular Show	Yes	No	No	No	Alpha Dog	Voice; Episode: "Rap It Up"
2012	Donald Glover: Weirdo	Yes	Yes	Yes	No	Himself	Stand-up special
2013	Sesame Street	Yes	No	No	No	LMNOP	Episode: "Figure It Out, Baby Figure It Out"
2013	Girls	Yes	No	No	No	Sandy	2 episodes
2013–2016	Adventure Time	Yes	No	No	No	Marshall Lee	Voice; 2 episodes
2015	Ultimate Spider-Man	Yes	No	No	No	Miles Morales / Spider-Man	Voice; 2 episodes
2015	China, IL	Yes	No	No	No	William "Transfer Billy"	Voice; 4 episodes
2016–2022	Atlanta	Yes	Yes	Yes	Yes	Earnest "Earn" Marks "Teddy Perkins" for one episode "Mr. Chocolate" for one episode	41 episodes; Also creator
2018	Saturday Night Live	Yes	No	No	No	Himself (host/musical guest)	Episode: "Donald Glover/Childish Gambino"
2023	Swarm	No	Yes	Yes	Yes	—N/a	7 episodes; Also creator
2023	The Eric Andre Show	Yes	No	No	No	Himself	Episode: "Woodchipper Hijinks"
2023	Adventure Time: Fionna and Cake	Yes	No	No	No	Marshall Lee	Voice
2024–present	Mr. & Mrs. Smith	Yes	Yes	Yes	Yes	John Smith	Also creator

=== Music videos ===
Year	Title	Album	Director
2012	"Giants" (Josh Osho featuring Childish Gambino)	L.I.F.E.	Jordan Bahat
2013	"Bed Peace" (Jhené Aiko featuring Childish Gambino)	Sail Out	Danny Williams
2013	"Relations (Remix)" (Kenna featuring Childish Gambino)	Land 2 Air Chronicles II: Imitation Is Suicide Chapter 1	Jason Chen
2014	"The Pressure" (Jhené Aiko)	Souled Out	Childish Gambino
2015	"Gahdamn" (Kari Faux)	Laugh Now, Die Later	Calmatic
2018	"Garden (Say It Like Dat)" (SZA)	Ctrl	Karena Evans

=== Web videos ===
Year	Title	Role	Notes
2006–2010	Derrick Comedy videos	Various characters	Also writer, composer and executive producer
2009	I Am Tiger Woods	Tiger Woods	Funny or Die short
2012	Community: Abed's Master Key	Troy Barnes (voice)	Webisode
2020	Donald Glover Presents	Himself	Also writer
2024	Hot Ones (guest appearance)	Himself	

== Awards and nominations ==
Glover has received numerous accolades including two Primetime Emmy Awards, five Grammy Awards, two Golden Globe Awards, two Peabody Awards, a Critics' Choice Award, and five Writers Guild of America Awards as well as a nomination for a Screen Actors Guild Award.

== Discography ==
- Camp (2011)
- Because the Internet (2013)
- "Awaken, My Love!" (2016)
- 3.15.20 (2020): reissued as Atavista (2024)
- Bando Stone & the New World (2024)

== Tours ==
=== Headlining ===
- The Sign Up Tour (2011)
- Camp Gambino Tour (2012)
- Deep Web Tour (2014)
- This Is America Tour (2018–2019)
- The New World Tour (2024)

== See also ==
- List of Primetime Emmy Award winners
- List of black Golden Globe Award winners and nominees
