= EP (Childish Gambino EP) =

EP by Childish Gambino
- Released: March 8, 2011
- Recorded: 2010–2011
- Genre: Hip-hop
- Length: 20:16
- Label: Glassnote
- Producer: Donald Glover; Ludwig Göransson

Childish Gambino chronology
Culdesac (2010)	EP (2011)	Camp (2011)

Childish Gambino EP chronology
A Charlie Brown X-mas EP (2006)	EP (2011)	Kauai (2014)

Professional ratings
Review scores
Source	Rating
Beats Per Minute	80%
MSN Music (Expert Witness)	B+

EP is the first EP by American rapper Donald Glover under the name Childish Gambino. It was released for free digital download on March 8, 2011. It includes five songs produced by Gambino and Ludwig Göransson. EP preceded the release of Gambino's debut album, Camp (2011), which was released eight months later. On February 2, 2018, nearly 7 years later, the project was re-released for commercial consumption.

== Promotion ==
The second track, "Freaks and Geeks", was released as a music video on February 25, 2011.

== Track listing ==
All tracks written and produced by Childish Gambino and Ludwig Göransson.

No.	Title	Length
1.	"Be Alone"	4:41
2.	"Freaks and Geeks"	3:37
3.	"My Shine"	3:30
4.	"Lights Turned On"	3:51
5.	"Not Going Back" (featuring Beldina Malaika)	4:41
Total length:		20:16
