= Culdesac (mixtape) =

Mixtape by Childish Gambino
- Released: July 3, 2010
- Recorded: 2009–2010
- Genres: Hip hop; indie pop
- Length: 56:26
- Label: Glassnote
- Producers: Donald Glover, Ludwig Göransson

Childish Gambino chronology
I Am Just a Rapper 2 (2010)	Culdesac (2010)	EP (2011)

Childish Gambino mixtape chronology
I Am Just a Rapper 2 (2010)	Culdesac (2010)	Royalty (2012)

Culdesac is the fifth mixtape by American rapper Childish Gambino better known as Donald Glover, released July 3, 2010. The entire mixtape was self-produced with assistance from Community composer, Ludwig Göransson. It was originally meant to be released on July 2, but was delayed for one day due to last minute material. Like his other mixtapes, Culdesac was released for free download.

== Production ==
When interviewed by Complex about what influenced his production, Glover said: "Well, I listened to a lot of indie music. I feel like a lot rap heads don’t really listen to a whole bunch of music and are closing themselves off. People feel that if you like T.I. then you won’t like Animal Collective or if you like Jeezy you’d probably hate Lykke Li, and I don’t think that’s the case. Hip-hop is the most eclectic type of music ever, because you can stay up on anything. If the beat is tight, the beat is tight. I’m from Atlanta, so I love Outkast. I listened to a lot of their stuff when I was younger. I listened to the Wu-Tang album. I listen to “All That I Got Is You” by Ghostface like a billion times. I remember being a kid and hearing that and being like, “Oh shit, that’s like me.” [Laughs.] My cousin and I used to sleep in the same bed. [Laughs.] It was the first time I ever felt something. I listen to Kanye of course. I feel like Kanye paved the way for people like Drake, Wiz Khalifa, and rappers who rap about their life. Not every rapper is from the streets, yo. Jay-Z’s story is not my story and I say that in the album. I love Jay-Z, but I can’t tell that story."

== Critical reception ==
Professional ratings
Review scores
Source	Rating
Consequence of Sound	3.5/5 stars
IGN	8/10
MSN Music (Expert Witness)	A−

Culdesac received positive reviews from critics. Chris Lee of the Los Angeles Times praised the album, saying: "The album's alterna-rock-augmented beats and emo-level of emotional rawness, meanwhile, are shot through with surprisingly legitimate R&B vocals also sung by Glover, making 'Culdesac' an unexpected delight: a sung-rapped cri de coeur that's as accomplished as any indie hip-hop released this year."

The Huffington Post gave the album generally positive reviews, stating: "It becomes clear from listening to "Culdesac" that Glover thinks he's on the highest creative level possible, a la Tupac, and maybe in his own way he is."

In his consumer guide for MSN Music, Robert Christgau asserted that Childish Gambino "brings more skills to the rap game than any pretender in years, fellow actor Drake included", and wrote of his musicianship, "His rhymes startle and amuse, his flow bubbles and snaps, his beats always get him where he's going, and on the expert pop song 'Got This Money' he hits the high notes on his own."

== Track listing ==
No.	Title	Length
1.	"Difference"	4:28
2.	"Hero"	4:22
3.	"I Be on That"	3:53
4.	"Got This Money"	4:58
5.	"So Fly"	3:45
6.	"You Know Me"	3:46
7.	"Let Me Dope You"	3:32
8.	"Do Ya Like"	4:37
9.	"I'm Alright"	1:45
10.	"Glory"	3:12
11.	"Fuck it All"	4:40
12.	"I'm on It"	3:30
13.	"Put It in My Video"	3:15
14.	"These Girls" (featuring Garfunkel and Oates)	3:30
15.	"The Last"	3:12
16.	"Got This Money" (acoustic @ Ace Hotel) (bonus track)	4:42

=== Notes ===
- "Hero" contains brass by Chris Lane
- "So Fly" samples "Ain't No Mountain High Enough" by Diana Ross and interpolates "Storybook Girl" by The Sylvers
- "Do Ya Like" samples "Melt My Heart to Stone" by Adele
- "I'm on It" samples "Silly" by Deniece Williams and contains additional vocals by Amani Starnes
