= Atavista =

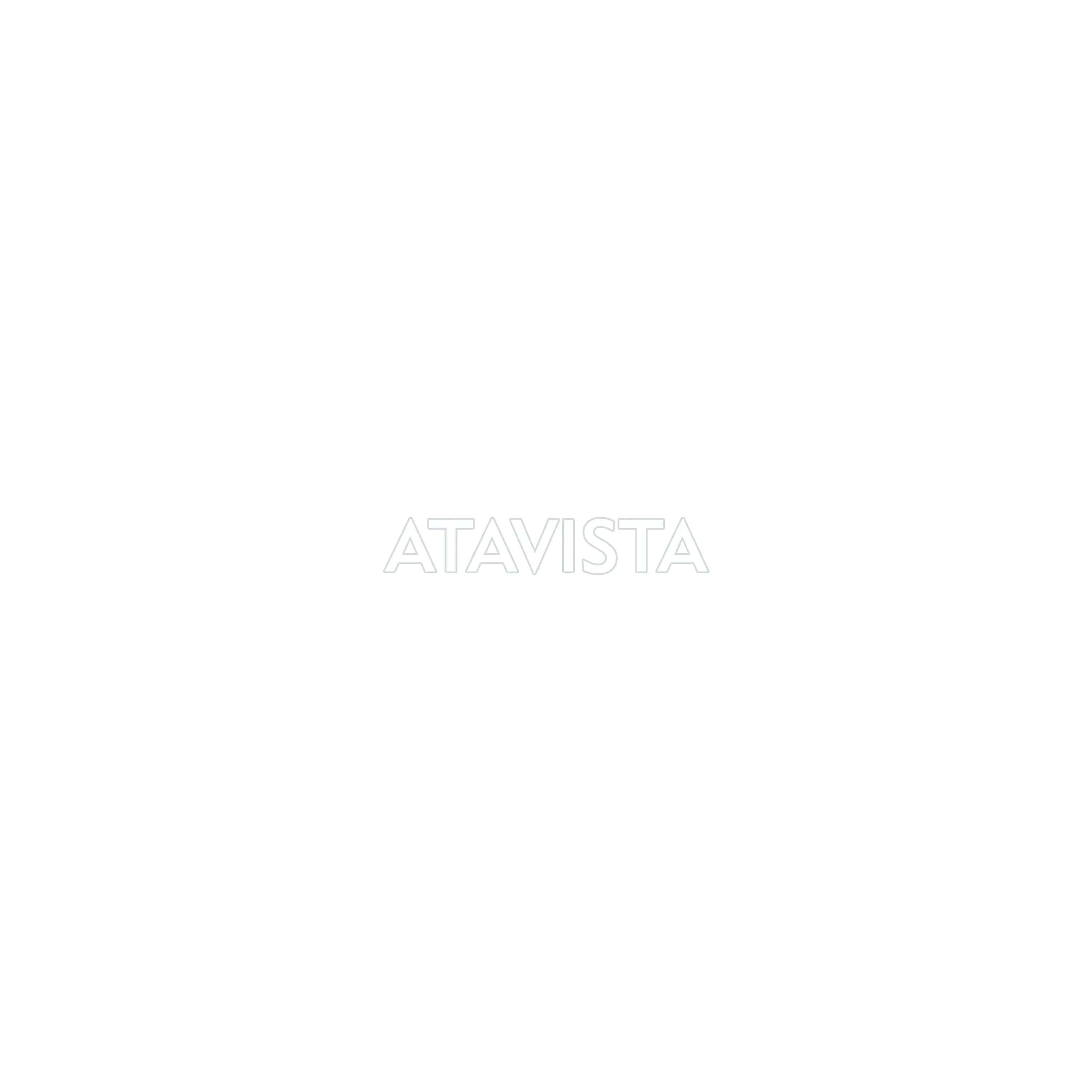

Studio album (reissue) by Childish Gambino
- Released: May 13, 2024
- Recorded: 2017—2024
- Genres: Alternative hip hop; alternative R&B; neo soul; experimental
- Length: 50:15
- Label: RCA
- Producers: Donald Glover; Chukwudi Hodge; Dahi; E.Y.; Ely Rise; Jai Paul; James Francies; Kurtis McKenzie; Loshendrix; Ludwig Göransson; Riley Mackin; Sam Sugarman

Childish Gambino chronology
| 3.15.20 (2020) | Atavista (2024) | Bando Stone & the New World (2024) |

Atavista is the reissue of American rapper Childish Gambino's fourth studio album, 3.15.20, described by Gambino as a "finished version". It was released on May 13, 2024, five days after 3.15.20 was removed from streaming platforms. The album maintains the same guest appearances from the unfinished version (Ariana Grande, Kadhja Bonet, 21 Savage and Ink), while incorporating new guest appearances from Young Nudy and Summer Walker.

== Background ==
In 2017, Donald Glover, during a live performance, revealed he planned to retire the stage name Childish Gambino, telling the Governors Ball Music Festival audience, "I'll see you for the last Gambino album." After some disputes with Glassnote, Glover signed with RCA Records in January 2018. In July 2018, Glover released the Summer Pack extended play containing the songs "Summertime Magic" and "Feels Like Summer", the former of which was labeled to be the lead single from Glover's forthcoming fourth studio album. Later that year, Glover performed live dates on the This Is America Tour and announced at the debut show in Atlanta that the tour would be his last. Individuals who purchased tickets to the tour received exclusive unfinished demos of the songs "Algorhythm" and "All Night" before the tour dates. Along his tour, he played "Algorhythm" and "All Night" (the latter was only played in Atlanta), and he also premiered new songs, then believed to be from his upcoming studio album, including a different version of "Atavista" and "Human Sacrifice". A Google Pixel 3 advertisement also debuted during the 61st Annual Grammy Awards featuring Donald Glover and using the previously teased song "Human Sacrifice".

Glover's fourth studio album, 3.15.20, was originally streamed to the public on March 15, 2020, before releasing a week later on streaming services. The album was released amid the beginning of the COVID-19 pandemic, as well as following the death of Glover's father. It received acclaim from critics, but Glover reflected on its unfinished nature and how it had impacted its reception and legacy.

== Promotion and release ==
On March 15, 2024, four years after the album's initial release, Glover teased a re-release of the album with the title Atavista, showing an updated tracklist that included alterations in tracks and sequencing. A month later, during a radio broadcast by his production company GILGA, Glover revealed that 3.15.20 was rushed out to streaming services because of personal issues and the start of the pandemic, and he plans to re-release the project as a "finished" album under its original title Atavista. Glover also revealed that following Atavista, a tentpole film from GILGA titled Bando Stone & the New World would release with its soundtrack acting as the final album under the moniker of Childish Gambino.

On May 8, 3.15.20 was removed from select streaming services leading up to the release of Atavista less than a week later. Atavista released as a surprise drop on May 13, alongside a music video for "Little Foot Big Foot" directed by Hiro Murai. That same night, Glover also confirmed via X that a new album, Bando Stone & the New World, would arrive in the summer. The tracks "0.00", "32.22", and "42.26", which appeared on 3.15.20 were not included on the album. The first of those developed into the track "We Are God" included on Bando Stone.

A world tour from Childish Gambino, titled The New World Tour, commenced in 2024 in support of both albums. A standard vinyl of Atavista will release in August 2024, with a special edition "video vinyl" coming later in the year. The latter, featuring exclusive videos for each song on the album was only available for purchase for 90 minutes on Glover's online store before no longer being sold.

== Track listing ==
Atavista track listing
| No. | Title | Writer(s) | Producer(s) | Length |
|---|---|---|---|---|
| 1. | "Atavista" | Donald Glover; Ludwig Göransson | Glover | 3:01 |
| 2. | "Algorhythm" | Glover; Dacoury Natche; Eyobed Getachew; Riley Mackin; Kurtis McKenzie; Ely Rise; Keir Gist; Reneé Neufville; Abdullah Bahr; Leon Ware; Zane Grey | Glover; DJ Dahi; E.Y.; McKenzie | 3:34 |
| 3. | "Time" (featuring Ariana Grande) | Glover; Natche; Ludwig Göransson; Ariana Grande; Chukwudi Hodge; Sarah Aarons | Glover; DJ Dahi; Göransson; Hodge^{[c]}; Ely Rise^{[c]}; Jai Paul^{[a]} | 5:34 |
| 4. | "Psilocybae (Millennial Love)" (featuring 21 Savage, Ink and Kadhja Bonet) | Glover; Natche; Shéyaa Bin Abraham-Joseph; Atia Boggs; Kadhja Bonet | Glover; DJ Dahi; Hodge^{[c]}; Rise^{[c]}; McKenzie^{[c]} | 6:32 |
| 5. | "To Be Hunted" | Glover; Natche; Göransson; Hodge; James Francies; McKenzie | Glover; DJ Dahi; Göransson; Hodge; McKenzie; Francies | 4:14 |
| 6. | "Sweet Thang" (featuring Summer Walker) | Glover; Summer Walker; Natche; Francies; Carlos Muñoz | Glover; DJ Dahi; Los Hendrix; Francies^{[c]} | 7:05 |
| 7. | "Little Foot Big Foot" (featuring Young Nudy) | Glover; Quantavious Tavario Thomas; Natche; Francies; Rise; Sam Sugarman; Irwin Henderson; Curtis Kirk | Glover; DJ Dahi; Rise; Sugarman; Francies | 3:46 |
| 8. | "Why Go to the Party" | Glover; Göransson; Francies; Hodge; Mackin | Glover; DJ Dahi; Göransson; Francies; Mackin | 0:41 |
| 9. | "Human Sacrifice" | Glover; Natche; Rise; Christopher Franke; Edgar Froese; Johannes Schmoelling | DJ Dahi; Göransson | 5:52 |
| 10. | "The Violence" | Glover; Natche; Göransson; Hodge; Legend Glover | Glover; DJ Dahi; Göransson; Hodge^{[c]} | 6:03 |
| 11. | "Final Church" | Glover; Natche; Francies; Mackin; Ira Nathaniel Smith | Glover; DJ Dahi; Francies; Mackin | 3:46 |
| Total length: | | | | 50:15 |

Notes

- ^{^[c]} signifies a co-producer
- ^{^[a]} signifies an additional producer

Sample credits

- "Algorhythm" contains samples of "Hey Mr. D.J.", written by Anthony Bahr, Kier Gist, Leon Ware, Renee Neufville and Zane Grey, as performed by Zhané.
- "Human Sacrifice" contains samples of "Choronzon", written by Christopher Franke, Edgar Froese and Johannes Schmoelling, as performed by Tangerine Dream.

== Personnel ==
Musicians

- Donald Glover – vocals (all tracks), percussion (track 6)
- Ely Rise – keyboards (tracks 1, 2, 7)
- Brent Jones – background vocals (track 2)
- The Best Life Singers – background vocals (track 2)
- James Francies – keyboards (tracks 4, 5, 8, 11); harpsichord, organ (6); synthesizer (10)
- Atia "Ink" Boggs – background vocals (track 4)
- Chukwudi Hodge – drums (track 4)
- Kurtis McKenzie – drums (track 4)
- Sam Sugarman – guitar (track 4)
- Loshendrix – guitar (tracks 5, 6)
- Ludwig Göransson – bass, guitar (track 10)
- Legend Glover – background vocals (track 10)
- Alaina Penderhughes – flute (track 10)
- The Denise Renee Choir – background vocals (track 11)
- Nate Smith – drums (track 11)
- Dani Markham – percussion (track 11)

Technical

- Andrew Dawson – mixing (all tracks)
- Mike Bozzi – mastering (all tracks)
- Riley Mackin – mixing, engineering (all tracks); mastering (track 9), drum editing (11)
- Donald Glover – mixing (track 9)
- Ruben Rivera – engineering (track 2)
- Kyle Stephens – engineering (track 3)

== Charts ==
Chart performance for Atavista
| Chart (2024–2025) | Peak position |
|---|---|
| Australian Albums (ARIA) | 40 |
| Australian Hip Hop/R&B Albums (ARIA) | 8 |
| Belgian Albums (Ultratop Flanders) | 72 |
| Canadian Albums (Billboard) | 84 |
| Irish Albums (IRMA) | 74 |
| Lithuanian Albums (AGATA) | 98 |
| New Zealand Albums (RMNZ) | 31 |
| Portuguese Albums (AFP) | 72 |
| Swiss Albums (Schweizer Hitparade) | 51 |
| UK Album Downloads (Official Charts) | 28 |
| UK R&B Albums (Official Charts) | 32 |
| US Billboard 200 | 62 |
| US Top R&B/Hip-Hop Albums (Billboard) | 23 |
