= 3.15.20 =

- Album cover for the one-track version; the twelve-track version of 3.15.20 features a blank white square without the "Donald Glover Presents" text.

Studio album by Childish Gambino
- Released: March 22, 2020
- Recorded: 2019
- Genres: Alternative hip hop; alternative R&B; neo soul; experimental
- Length: 57:44
- Label: RCA
- Producers: Donald Glover; DJ Dahi; EY; James Francies, Jr.; Loshendrix; Ludwig Göransson; Chukwudi Hodge; Riley Mackin; Jai Paul; Kurtis McKenzie

Childish Gambino chronology
Summer Pack (2018)	3.15.20 (2020)	Atavista (2024)

Singles from 3.15.20
- 1. "Time" Released: March 27, 2020; 2. "12.38" Released: April 14, 2020; 3. "Sweet Thang (24.19)" Released: April 14, 2020

3.15.20 is the fourth studio album by the American actor and rapper Donald Glover, under his stage name Childish Gambino. It was initially uploaded to the website donaldgloverpresents.com on March 15, 2020, before being taken down 12 hours later. After a countdown, it was released to streaming and download services under the title 3.15.20 on March 22. It is therefore interchangeably referred to as both 3.15.20 and Donald Glover Presents.

The album features guest appearances from Ariana Grande, Kadhja Bonet, 21 Savage and Ink. Glover produced the album with a range of collaborators including DJ Dahi, longtime producer Ludwig Göransson, Chukwudi Hodge, Kurtis McKenzie and James Francies Jr.

Most of the album's track titles refer to the time at which they appear on the album; for example, "12.38" appears 12 minutes and 38 seconds into the album. The 2018 promotional single, "Feels Like Summer", appears on the album under the title "42.26". The album received critical acclaim, with praise particularly directed towards Glover's songwriting and the album's themes.

On May 8, 2024, 3.15.20 was removed from select streaming services leading up to the release of Atavista, a reworked version of the album. Atavista was released 5 days later on May 13.

== Background ==
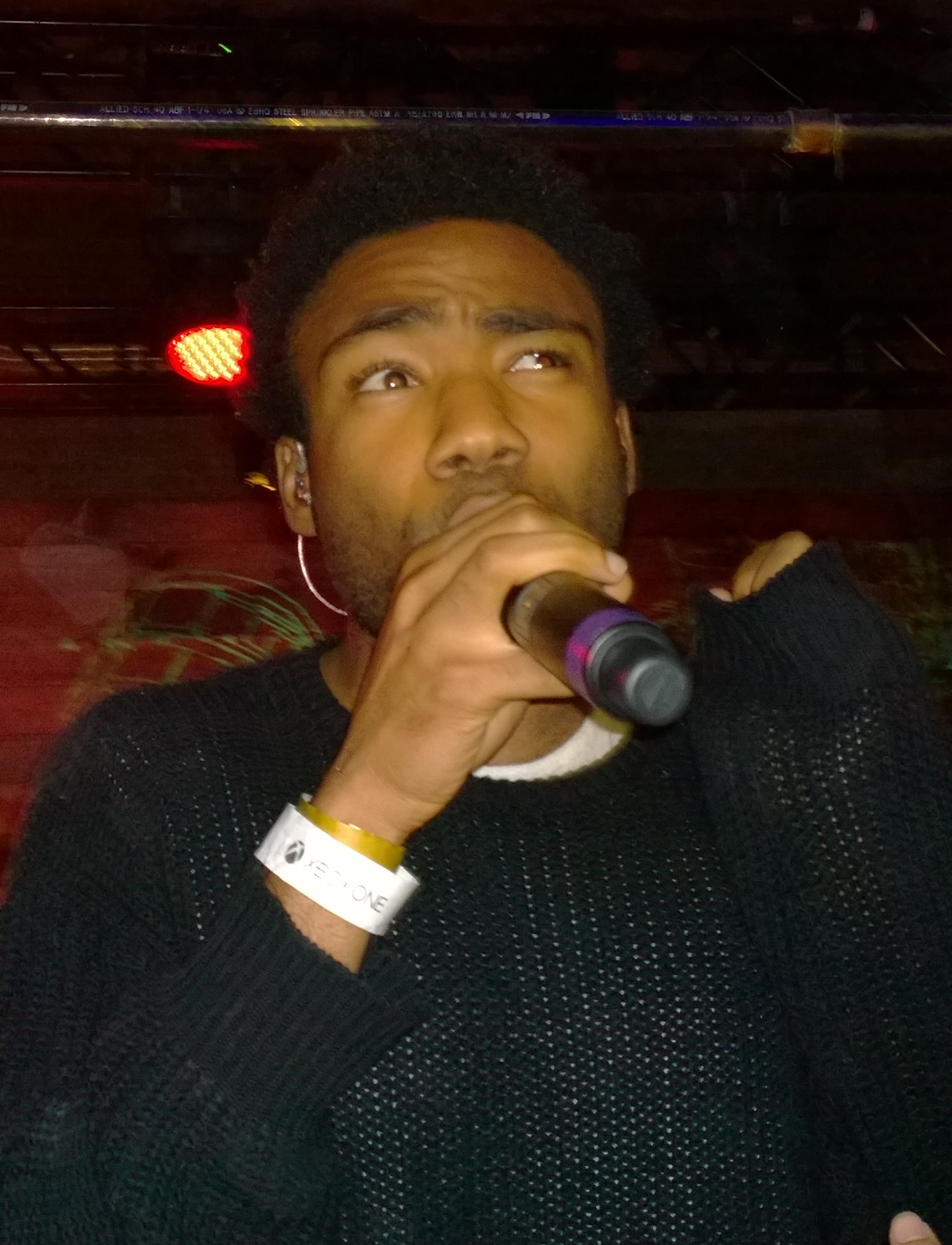
In 2017, Glover announced that his fourth studio album would be his last under the Childish Gambino stage name.

In 2017, Donald Glover, during a live performance, revealed he planned to retire the stage name Childish Gambino, telling the Governors Ball Music Festival audience, "I'll see you for the last Gambino album." After some disputes with Glassnote, Glover signed with RCA Records in January 2018. In May 2018, he premiered two songs titled "Saturday" and "This Is America" while performing as both host and musical guest on Saturday Night Live. The latter and its political music video went viral, achieving widespread success and critical acclaim, giving him his first song to reach No. 1 on the Billboard Hot 100.

In July 2018, Glover released the Summer Pack extended play containing the songs "Summertime Magic" and "Feels Like Summer", the former of which was labelled to be the lead singles from Glover's forthcoming fourth studio album titled “Almanac” which later got cancelled and replaced the eventual release of 3.15.20 in 2020. Later that year, Glover performed live dates on the This Is America Tour and announced at the debut show in Atlanta that the tour would be his last. Individuals who purchased tickets to the tour received exclusive unfinished demos of the songs "Algorhythm" and "All Night" before the tour dates. Along his tour, he played "Algorhythm" and "All Night" (the latter was only played in Atlanta), and he also premiered new songs, then believed to be from his upcoming studio album, including "Atavista", "39.28" (then untitled), and "Human Sacrifice".

A Google Pixel 3 advertisement debuted during the 61st Annual Grammy Awards featuring Donald Glover and using the previously teased song "Human Sacrifice."

Glover also debuted a trailer for his musical film Guava Island at his PHAROS event in December 2018, which leaked online. Glover performed a new record at his Pharos festival called “Warlords” that featured Kid Cudi, which attenders described as ambient, chill, and had an 808s & Heartbreak inspired production. Glover debuted a performance of his new song “32.22/Shock" during Glover's headlining performance at Coachella in 2019, and the film was debuted the same weekend. The musical film Guava Island contained several unreleased songs, including "Time", "Die with You", and "Saturday", hinting at their inclusion on the album.

== Promotion and release ==
Promotional artwork that was displayed during the live stream.

Early morning March 15, 2020, the website donaldgloverpresents.com was circulated and promoted on social media by individuals connected to Glover and his management. The website featured a collection of songs, including a few previously performed and teased tracks, playing live on a loop which were subsequently removed 12 hours later. Additionally, the website displayed promotional artwork, appearing to be a sketched concept for extendable album art. A few days after the stream ended, the website displayed a countdown set to end a week after the original stream.

Following the concluded countdown, the website updated with the same looped stream of songs with a handwritten note from Glover about his inspirations behind the album. At the same time, the previously streamed collection of songs was uploaded to streaming services as 3.15.20, Glover's fourth studio album. The album, released with limited song titles and a blank white cover, was released as a 12-track album under the Childish Gambino moniker, as well as a continuous play version under the artist name Donald Glover Presents.

In an interview with Complex in 2023, when reflecting on how the album's lack of traditional release, art style, and tracklist may have impacted its reception, Glover said, "I had just lost my father, I had just had a kid, and I was going through a lot. I was having a lot of different new experiences, and that's what I expressed. I think people are right. It would have garnered a different [response]. My wife's always been like, "If you do punk things, you get punk results." And it was definitely a punk thing."

A re-release of the album, named Atavista, was announced by Glover in 2024 and released in May of the same year with changes to the mix and tracklisting. The tracks were all given titles along with a differing opening track, the removal of "32.22" and "Feels Like Summer", the shortening of "39.28", and the addition of "Human Sacrifice." "0.00", 3.15.20's original opener would later be developed into the track "We Are God" from Glover's final Gambino album Bando Stone & the New World.

== Critical reception ==
Professional ratings
Aggregate scores
Source	Rating
AnyDecentMusic?	7.9/10
Metacritic	83/100
Review scores
Source	Rating
AllMusic	4.5/5 stars
Clash	5/10
Consequence of Sound	B+
Exclaim!	7/10
The Guardian	5/5 stars
NME	4/5 stars
Pitchfork	6.0/10
PopMatters	10/10 stars
Sputnikmusic	4.0/5

According to the review aggregator Metacritic, the album received critical acclaim, with an average review score of 83 out of 100. Aggregator AnyDecentMusic? gave it 7.9 out of 10, based on their assessment of the critical consensus.

AllMusic's critic Tim Sendra wrote in his review that "the 2020 Childish Gambino record 3.15.20 is an expansive, mind-bending trip that never takes an expected step." Sendra continued by comparing the album to other artists' work, stating that "The end result is a challenging, hooky, mysterious and odd record that feels like it was built out of pieces left over from a collision between Outkast, David Bowie, Sly and the Family Stone, and Prince." Sendra ended his review by saying that 3.15.20 is the "second classic, timeless and timely Childish Gambino record in a row." Writing for Consequence of Sound, Okla Jones praised the album, stating that "Glover's willingness to experiment with different sounds and harmonies is evidence that things either foreign or unknown need not be feared, but embraced. No, as in life, there's beauty in uncertainty." While praising Glover's songwriting and the features on 3.15.20, Jones criticized the production and vocals on a few of the album's tracks.

The Guardian's reviewer Dean Van Nguyen acclaimed the album, saying that "The actor, comedian and musician Donald Glover has made the first truly outstanding album of the decade, offsetting cultural examinations with moments of sweet levity." Nguyen further stated that the themes of the album fit along with the present-day insecurities with the COVID-19 pandemic, saying that "The disruption caused by the coronavirus forces us to question how strong the foundations of civilisation really are. Glover never could have seen the pandemic coming when he was recording the album, yet at a time when much of what we thought was strong is weak - what we thought was eternal is potentially fleeting – 3.15.20 captures the insecurity of lived reality and the humanity that truly defines our existence." Sam Moore of NME gave the album a favorable review, particularly praising Glover's decision to bring up more private matters on the album, referring to the song "47.48". Moore wrote that "The rolling groove of '47.48' is another highlight: Glover's doomy proclamations about the violent and unjust aspects of society ('little boys playing 'round, shot down') eventually subside for a more optimistic outlook for the future as Glover sweetly interacts with his young son Legend about the people they each love." Moore continued by saying that "Glover's willingness to share such a candid moment on record is particularly interesting given his past proclivity towards keeping his private life largely offline, and may be a sign that the star is beginning to let his guard down as the outside world continues to try to peer in."

Some reviews were more mixed. Debbie Ijaduola of Clash unfavorably compared the album to Childish Gambino's previous efforts, stating that "Lacking the strong narrative thrust so apparent on his [Glover's] past albums, the project is incredibly disappointing. From what it looks like, it seems like there was a reason he said he was quitting music." However, Ijaduola highlighted the songs "Algorhythm", "42.26", and "47.48" as the album's most enjoyable tracks. Pitchfork's critic Paul A. Thompson stated that "3.15.20 is studded with little hooks and big ideas that serve as lures. Its spiritual largesse is weighed down by impulses carried halfway to their endpoints and moments of frustrating pretense." Thompson, like other reviewers, praised the song "47.48", saying that the track "sounds like a locked-in house band; the lyrics are actually about a crushing and ever-present violence, and the tension mesmerizes. That song ends with a conversation between Glover and his young son about love-sweeter than it sounds on paper, chilling given the juxtaposition."

=== Accolades ===
Accolades for 3.15.20
Publication	Accolade	Rank	Ref.
Variety	Variety's Best Albums of 2020 – Mid-Year	N/A	

== Track listing ==
3.15.20 track listing – Childish Gambino
No.	Title	Writer(s)	Producer(s)	Length
1.	"0.00"	Donald Glover; James Francies, Jr.; Denise Renee	D. Glover	2:59
2.	"Algorhythm"	D. Glover; Dacoury Natche; Eyobed Getachew; Riley Mackin; Kurtis McKenzie; Ely Rise; Keir Gist; Reneé Neufville; Abdullah Bahr; Leon Ware; Zane Grey	D. Glover; DJ Dahi; EY	3:32
3.	"Time" (featuring Ariana Grande)	D. Glover; Natche; Ludwig Göransson; Ariana Grande; Chukwudi Hodge; Sarah Aarons	D. Glover; DJ Dahi; Göransson; Hodge; Jai Paul^{[a]}	6:07
4.	"12.38" (featuring 21 Savage, Ink, and Kadhja Bonet)	D. Glover; Natche; Shéyaa Bin Abraham-Joseph; Atia Boggs; Kadhja Bonet	D. Glover; DJ Dahi	6:32
5.	"19.10"	D. Glover; Natche; Göransson; Hodge; Kurtis McKenzie; Francies	D. Glover; DJ Dahi; Göransson; Hodge; McKenzie	5:08
6.	"24.19"	D. Glover; Natche; Carlos Muñoz	D. Glover; DJ Dahi; Loshendrix	7:59
7.	"32.22"	D. Glover; Natche; Göransson; Hodge; McKenzie; Francies	D. Glover; DJ Dahi; Göransson; Hodge; McKenzie	3:12
8.	"35.31"	D. Glover; Natche; Erwin Henderson, Jr.; Curtis Kirk; Peaches Monroee; Sam Sugarman	DJ Dahi	3:56
9.	"39.28"	D. Glover; Francies; Mackin	D. Glover; Francies; Mackin	2:59
10.	"42.26"	D. Glover; Göransson	D. Glover; Göransson	5:21
11.	"47.48"	D. Glover; Natche; Göransson; Hodge; Legend Glover	D. Glover; DJ Dahi; Göransson; Hodge	6:00
12.	"53.49"	D. Glover; Natche; Francies	D. Glover; DJ Dahi; Francies; Mackin^{[a]}	3:55
Total length:				57:44

Donald Glover Presents track listing – Donald Glover
No.	Title	Length
1.	"3.15.20" (featuring Ariana Grande, 21 Savage, Kadhja Bonet and Ink)	57:44
Total length:		57:44

Notes

- ^{^[a]} signifies an additional producer

Sample credits

- "Algorhythm" contains samples of "Hey Mr. D.J.", written by Anthony Bahr, Kier Gist, Leon Ware, Rene Neufville and Zane Grey, and performed by Zhané.

== Personnel ==
Credits adapted from Tidal.

Musicians

- Childish Gambino – vocals
- Ariana Grande – featured vocals (3)
- 21 Savage – featured vocals (4)
- Atia "Ink" Boggs – featured vocals (4)
- Kadhja Bonet – featured vocals (4)
- James Francies Jr. – keyboards (1, 5, 9, 12), synthesizer (4, 7, 11), Harpischord (6), organ (6)
- Ely Rise – keyboards (2–4, 8)
- Brent Jones – background vocals (2, 3, 7)
- The Best Life Singers – background vocals (2–3, 7)
- Legend Glover – background vocals (11)
- The Denise Renee Choir – background vocals (12)
- Chukwudi Hodge – drums (3, 4, 7), bells (7)
- Kurtis McKenzie – drums (4)
- Nate Smith – drums (12)
- Loshendrix – guitar (6)
- Ludwig Göransson – bass (11), guitar (11)
- Elena Pinderhughes – flute (11)
- Dani Markham – percussion

Production

- Donald Glover – production (all exc. 8), mixing engineer (track 10)
- DJ Dahi – production (all exc. 1, 9–10)
- Loshendrix – production (6)
- Ludwig Göransson – production (3, 5, 7, 10–11)
- EY – production (2)
- Chukwudi Hodge – production (3, 5, 7, 11)
- Kurtis Mckenzie – production (5, 7)
- Jamies Francies Jr. – production (9, 12)
- Jai Paul – additional production (3)
- Riley Mackin – mix engineering, record engineering, additional production (12)
- Ruben Rivera – record engineering (2)
- Kyle Stephens – record engineering (3)
- Mike Bozzi – master engineering (3)

== Charts ==
3.15.20 sales chart performance
Chart (2020)	Peak position
Australian Albums (ARIA)	11
Austrian Albums (Ö3 Austria)	55
Belgian Albums (Ultratop Flanders)	24
Belgian Albums (Ultratop Wallonia)	112
Canadian Albums (Billboard)	17
Dutch Albums (Album Top 100)	60
Estonian Albums (Eesti Tipp-40)	29
Irish Albums (Official Charts)	17
New Zealand Albums (RMNZ)	18
Scottish Albums (Official Charts)	53
Swiss Albums (Schweizer Hitparade)	45
UK Albums (Official Charts)	20
US Billboard 200	13
US Top R&B/Hip-Hop Albums (Billboard)	8
