= DJ Dahi =

American record producer from California

Dahi
- Also known as: DJ Dahi
- Born: Dacoury Dahi Natche; March 10, 1983 (age 43)
- Origin: Inglewood, California, U.S.
- Education: University of California, Santa Cruz (BS)
- Genres: Hip hop; R&B; pop
- Occupations: Disc jockey; songwriter; record producer; singer
- Instruments: Ableton Live; Cubase; Logic Pro; MacBook Pro; Maschine; bass
- Years active: 2011–present
- Labels: ARTium; Def Jam
- Member of: D.R.U.G.$.

Dacoury Dahi Natche (born March 10, 1983), known professionally as Dahi (formerly DJ Dahi), is an American record producer, songwriter, disc jockey and singer from Inglewood, California. Working primarily in hip hop and R&B music, he has been credited on commercially successful singles including "Money Trees" by Kendrick Lamar, "Worst Behavior" by Drake, and "I Don't Fuck with You" by Big Sean—the latter rose to number 11 on the Billboard Hot 100. He made his vocal debut on Lamar's 2018 single "Loyalty", which he also produced.

Dahi won the Grammy Award for Best Rap Song in 2020 for his work on "A Lot" by 21 Savage. He has also been nominated for four Grammy Awards in the Album of the Year and Best Rap Album categories, and once for Producer of the Year, Non-Classical. Aside from his solo production career, Natche is also a member of the production team D.R.U.G.$., along with Ty Dolla Sign, among others.

== Musical career ==
Dahi learned disc jockeying while he was attending the University of California, Santa Cruz, where he majored in Film and American studies. After returning to Los Angeles in 2007, he started collaborating with local rappers such as Pac Div, TiRon, and Fashawn. Dahi also collaborated with Dom Kennedy and ScHoolboy Q before he achieved his first commercial success in 2012 with "Money Trees" from Kendrick Lamar's platinum album Good Kid, M.A.A.D City. The album received several nominations including one for Album of the Year and Best Rap Album at the 56th Annual Grammy Awards, while "Money Trees" was named by Complex as the ninth best instrumental of the previous five years.

In 2013, Dahi produced "Worst Behavior" by Drake that charted at number 89 on the US Billboard Hot 100 after its release in 2014. The following year, he co-produced the Big Sean single "I Don't Fuck with You", which reached the top of the US Billboard Hot R&B/Hip-hop songs chart and received 8× Platinum certification from RIAA. Dahi was also credited as a songwriter and producer for five tracks in Madonna's 2015 album Rebel Heart. The same year, Dahi co-produced three tracks on the album Compton: A Soundtrack by Dr. Dre. Dahi was featured alongside Jhené Aiko on the song "Lemme Know" by Vince Staples, from his 2015 album Summertime ‘06; he was also credited as producer on a few songs from the album.

In 2016, Dahi co-produced "U with Me?" for the album Views by Drake, which earned him his second Grammy nomination for Album of the Year. He also put forward a tentative release date for his own solo album titled The Good Seed, but the album did not materialize in 2016.

Dahi collaborated a second time with Kendrick Lamar in 2017 and produced five tracks in the album Damn that included "Loyalty" featuring Rihanna and "XXX" featuring U2. The album received several critical accolades including a Pulitzer Prize for Music and the Best Rap Album at the 2018 Grammy Awards. In 2020, the album was ranked 175th on Rolling Stone's updated list of the 500 Greatest Albums of All Time.

In 2018, Dahi produced two songs from 21 Savage's studio album I Am Greater than I Was. One of the songs, "A Lot", earned him the award for Best Rap Song at the 62nd Annual Grammy Awards.

In 2019, Dahi collaborated with indie pop band Vampire Weekend for their album Father of the Bride and co-produced the single "Big Blue", which charted number 33 in US Hot Rock & Alternative Songs (Billboard). He also co-produced the 2020 Childish Gambino album 3.15.20 that included "Time" featuring Ariana Grande and "Psilocybae (Millennial Love)" featuring 21 Savage, Ink and Kadhja Bonet among seven other tracks co-produced by him. In 2021, he produced "Gravity", a single by Brent Faiyaz and himself featuring Tyler, the Creator, which reached a peak position on 71 in the US Billboard Hot 100 chart and was certified Platinum by RIAA.

Dahi teamed up with Kendrick Lamar again in 2022 and co-produced five tracks for Mr. Morale and the Big Steppers. The album received nomination for Album of the Year and won in the Best Rap Album category at the 65th Annual Grammy Awards. Dahi also received a Producer of the Year nomination for his work on Mr. Morale & the Big Steppers, Gemini Rights by Steve Lacy and Ramona Park Broke My Heart by Vince Staples.

In 2023, Dahi appeared in the documentary film Anthem directed by Peter Nicks, which followed Dahi and composer Kris Bowers on a musical road trip across the United States in a bid to reimagine the national anthem. The film premiered at Tribeca Festival in June 2023 and was acquired by Onyx Collective for Hulu.

Dahi has a publishing contract with Sony Music Publishing and is a SESAC member.

On 28 August 2026, Dahi released his debut studio album, titled Black Boy (Alternative), featuring many of his long-time collaborators including Kendrick Lamar, Childish Gambino and Vince Staples.

== Awards and nominations ==
List of selected accolades, showing award category and year presented on
Award	Year	Recipient(s)	Category	Result	Ref.
American Music Awards	2013	Good Kid, M.A.A.D City	Favorite Rap/Hip Hop Album	Nominated	
American Music Awards	2017	Damn	Favorite Rap/Hip Hop Album	Won	
American Music Awards	2022	Mr. Morale & the Big Steppers	Favorite Hip Hop Album	Won	
BET Awards	2018	Damn	Album of the Year	Won	
BET Awards	2023	Mr. Morale & the Big Steppers	Album of the Year	Nominated	
BET Hip Hop Awards	2017	Damn	Hip Hop Album of the Year	Won	
BET Hip Hop Awards	2013	Good Kid, M.A.A.D City	Hip Hop Album of the Year	Won	
BET Hip Hop Awards	2022	Mr. Morale & the Big Steppers	Hip Hop Album of the Year	Won	
Billboard Music Awards	2013	Good Kid, M.A.A.D City	Top Rap Album	Nominated	
Billboard Music Awards	2017	Views	Top Billboard 200 Album	Won	
Billboard Music Awards	2017	Views	Top Rap Album	Won	
Billboard Music Awards	2018	Damn	Top Billboard 200 Album	Won	
Billboard Music Awards	2018	Damn	Top Selling Album	Nominated	
Billboard Music Awards	2018	Damn	Top Rap Album	Won	
Grammy Awards	2014	Good Kid, M.A.A.D City	Album of the Year	Nominated	
Grammy Awards	2017	Views	Album of the Year	Nominated	
Grammy Awards	2018	Damn	Album of the Year	Nominated	
Grammy Awards	2020	"A Lot" (21 Savage featuring J. Cole)	Best Rap Song	Won	
Grammy Awards	2023	Mr. Morale & the Big Steppers	Album of the Year	Nominated	
Grammy Awards	2023	"Buttons" (Steve Lacy), "Count Me Out" (Kendrick Lamar), "Die Hard" (Kendrick Lamar), "DJ Quik" (Vince Staples), "Father Time" (Kendrick Lamar featuring Sampha), "Give You the World" (Steve Lacy), "Mercury" (Steve Lacy), "Mirror" (Kendrick Lamar), "Rich Spirit" (Kendrick Lamar)	Producer of the Year, Non-Classical	Nominated	
HipHopDX Awards	2013	Good Kid, M.A.A.D City	Album of the Year	Won	
HipHopDX Awards	2013	Good Kid, M.A.A.D City	Readers' Choice Album of the Year	Won	
HipHopDX Awards	2017	Damn	Rap Album of the Year	Won	
iHeartRadio Music Awards	2017	Views	Hip Hop Album of the Year	Won	
iHeartRadio Music Awards	2018	Damn	Hip Hop Album of the Year	Won	
NAACP Image Awards	2018	Damn	Outstanding Album	Won	
NAACP Image Awards	2023	Mr. Morale & the Big Steppers	Outstanding Album	Nominated	
People's Choice Awards	2022	Mr. Morale & the Big Steppers	The Album of 2022	Nominated	
Pulitzer Prize	2018	Damn	Pulitzer Prize for Music	Won	
Soul Train Music Awards	2013	Good Kid, M.A.A.D City	Album of the Year	Won	
XXL Awards	2013	Good Kid, M.A.A.D City	Album of the Year	Won	

== Discography ==
- Black Boy (Alternative) (2026)

== Production discography ==
=== Singles produced ===
List of singles produced, with selected chart positions and certifications, showing year released and album name
Title	Year	Peak chart positions						Certifications	Album
Title	Year	US	US R&B	AUS	CAN	UK	UK R&B	Certifications	Album
"My Type of Party" (Dom Kennedy)	2012	—	—	—	—	—	—		Yellow Album
"Worst Behavior" (Drake)	2014	89	26	—	—	—	—	RIAA: Platinum	Nothing Was the Same
"I Don't Fuck with You" (Big Sean featuring E-40)	2014	11	1	50	35	90	10	RIAA: 8× Platinum	Dark Sky Paradise
"Cadillactica" (Big K.R.I.T.)	2014	—	—	—	—	—	—		Cadillactica
"Hell of a Night" (Schoolboy Q)	2014	—	46	—	—	—	—		Oxymoron
"Stand For" (Ty Dolla Sign)	2014	—	—	—	—	—	—		Non-album single
"Drug Dealers Anonymous" (Pusha T featuring JAY Z)	2016	—	—	—	—	—	—		King Push
"Trainwreck" (Banks)	2017	—	—	—	—	—	—		The Altar
"Self Care" (Mac Miller)	2018	33	18	83	38	61	—	RIAA: 5× Platinum	Swimming
"Big Blue" (Vampire Weekend)	2019	—	—	—	—	—	—		Father of the Bride
"Gravity" (Brent Faiyaz featuring Tyler, the Creator)	2021	71	—	—	—	60	—		Wasteland
"—" denotes a recording that did not chart or was not released in that territory.

=== Other songs ===
Rob Rush – Childhood Hero (2006)

- 10. "Useful"

Jern Eye – Vision (2009)

- 01. "Now"

Ayomari – The PB & J Solution (2010)

- 02. "Happy Thoughts" (featuring TiRon)
- 07. "What If This Is It?"

TiRon – MSTRD (2010)

- 09. "For Your Smile"
- 10. "Take a Bow"

Pac Div – Don't Mention It (2010)

- 01. "Underdogs II" (featuring Colin Munroe)

Iggy Azalea – Ignorant Art (2011)

- 08. "Drop That" (featuring Problem)

Pac Div – Mania (2011)

- 02. SuperNegroes

Pac Div – The Div (2011)

- 02. "Posted"
- 04. "Move On"
- 10. "Number 1"

TiRon & Ayomari – A Sucker for Pumps (2011)

- 01. "Jack Kerouac" (co-prod. DrewByrd)
- 08. "No Wonder"

Dom Kennedy – Yellow Album (2012)

- 13. "P H"

Fashawn – Champagne & Styrofoam Cups (2012)

- 02. "Coogi" (featuring Mr. MFN eXquire)
- 07. "In Love with a Lie"
- 09. "Medecine Man (Drug Free)" (featuring Wiz Khalifa)

Freddie Gibbs – Baby Face Killa (2012)

- 08. "Bout It Bout It" (featuring Kirko Bangz)
- 09. "Stay Down"

GrandeMarshall – 800

- 01. "Dearly Beloved"
- 05. "Ellie Fox"

Kendrick Lamar – Good Kid, M.A.A.D City (2012)

- 05. "Money Trees" (featuring Jay Rock)

Mac Miller – "Dog Pound" (2012)

- 00. "Dog Pound" (featuring Waka Flocka Flame)

Pac Div – GMB (2012)

- 01. "Intro"
- 09. "Fuck Y'all" (featuring Kurupt & Battlecat)

Schoolboy Q – Habits & Contradictions (2012)

- 09. "Sexting"

Skeme – Alive and Living (2012)

- 14. "Living"

Smoke DZA – "K.O.N.Y." (2012)

- 01. "K.O.N.Y."

Various artists – The Cafeteria Line Presents: HNGRY (2012)

- 12. "Pink Boxes" - Ayomari
- 15. "HNGRY" - TiRon, Ayomari & James Fauntleroy

Casey Veggies – Life Changes (2013)

- 04. "She in My Car" (featuring Dom Kennedy)

KRNDN – Everything's Nothing (2013)

- 10. "Cuban Link Gucci Rope" (featuring Donyea G)

Kris Kasanova – 24K (2013)

- 12. "Tomorrow" (featuring SZA)

Nacho Picasso – High & Mighty (2013)

- 04. "Diobedient" (featuring Jarv Dee)

Nipsey Hussle – Crenshaw (2013)

- 21. "Crenshaw & Slauson (True Story)" Hidden song at the end. (@7:55)

Rich Kidd – In My Opinion (2013)

- 13. "I'd Be Lying"

Spenzo – In Spenzo We Trust (2013)

- 10. "Heaven Can Wait"
- 11. "Get Money"

Travis Scott – Owl Pharaoh (2013)

- 06. "Hell of a Night" (co-produced with Rakhi, Rey Reel, Travis Scott)

Vic Mensa – INNANETAPE (2013)

- 08. "YNSP" (featuring Eliza Doolittle)

Schoolboy Q – Oxymoron (2014)

- 10. "Hell of a Night" (produced with JayFrance)

Lily Allen – Sheezus (2014)

- 01. "Sheezus"

Deluxe Edition Bonus Disc

- 02. "Who Do You Love?"
- 03. "Miserable Without Your Love"

Smoke DZA – Dream.ZONE.Achieve (2014)

- 10. "Hearses" (featuring Ab-Soul)
- 17. "Tropicana Roses"

SZA – Z (2014)

- 07. "Babylon" (featuring Kendrick Lamar)

Ab-Soul – These Days... (2014)

- 02. "Tree of Life" (co-produced with Curtiss King)

Travis Scott – Days Before Rodeo (2014)

- 02. "Mamacita" (featuring Rich Homie Quan & Young Thug) (co-produced with Metro Boomin & Travis Scott)

Mick Jenkins – The Water[s] (2014)

- 12. "Dehydration"

Tinashe – Aquarius (2014)

- 02. "Bet" (featuring Devonté Hynes) (co-produced with Blood Orange)

Logic – Under Pressure (2014)

- 08. "Never Enough"

Big K.R.I.T. – Cadillactica (2014)

- 04. "Cadillactica" (produced with DJ Khalil)
- 11. "Third Eye"
- 16. "Mt. Olympus Reprise"
- 18. "Let It Show"

Maejor – Spirit (2014)

- 02. "We Don't Talk No More"

Jazmine Sullivan – Reality Show (2015)

- 03. "Brand New" (produced with Ben Free)

Lupe Fiasco – Tetsuo & Youth (2015)

- 11. "Chopper" (featuring Billy Blue, Buk of Psychodrama, Trouble, Trae tha Truth, Fam-Lay and Glasses Malone)
- 13. "Madonna" (featuring Nikki Jean)
- 14. "Adoration of the Magi" (featuring Crystal Torres)
- 15. "They.Resurrect.Over.New" (featuring Ab-Soul and Troi) (produced with Blood Diamonds)

Kid Ink – Full Speed (2015)

- 02. "Faster"

Big Sean – Dark Sky Paradise (2015)

- 04. "I Don't Fuck with You" (featuring E-40) (produced by DJ Mustard, Kanye West and Mike Free, co-produced by Dahi)
- 12. "Outro"
- 14. "Research" (featuring Ariana Grande) (produced by Metro Boomin, co-produced by Dahi)

Madonna – Rebel Heart (2015)

- 1-02. "Devil Pray" (produced with Madonna, Avicii and Blood Diamonds)
- 1-09. "Iconic" (produced by Madonna, Toby Gad, AFSHeeN and Josh Cumbee, additional production by Dahi)
- 1–11. "Body Shop" (produced with Madonna, Toby Gad and Blood Diamonds)
- 2-01. "Beautiful Scars" (produced with Madonna and Blood Diamonds)
- 2-02. "Borrowed Time" (produced with Madonna, Avicii, Carl Falk and Blood Diamonds)

Tinashe – Amethyst (2015)

- 05. "Wanderer" (produced with Tinashe and Ritz Reynolds)

Wale – The Album About Nothing (2015)

- 02. "The Helium Balloon" (produced with Sonny Digital & Frank Dukes)
- 05. "The Middle Finger" (produced with Dave Glass Animals)
- 08. "The God Smile"

Dom Kennedy – By Dom Kennedy (2015)

- 06. "Fried Lobster" (featuring Bonic)

Vince Staples – Summertime '06 (2015)

- 1-02. "Lift Me Up" (produced with No I.D.)
- 1-04. "Birds & Bees" (featuring Daley)
- 1-06. "Lemme Know" (featuring Jhené Aiko and DJ Dahi) (produced with No I.D. and Brian Kidd)
- 2-08. "C.N.B." (produced with No I.D. and Brian Kidd)
- 2-09. "Like It Is" (produced with No I.D. and Brian Kidd)

Dr. Dre – Compton (2015)

- 02. "Talk About It" (featuring King Mez and Justus) (produced with Free School)
- 05. "All in a Day's Work" (featuring Anderson .Paak and Marsha Ambrosius) (produced with DJ Khalil)
- 09. "Deep Water" (featuring Kendrick Lamar, Justus and Anderson .Paak) (produced with Focus..., Cardiak, Dem Jointz and Dr. Dre)

Rico Love – Turn the Lights On (2015)
02. "Bad Attitude" (produced with Love)

Travis Scott – Rodeo (2015)

- 05. "90210" (produced with Allen Ritter and Mike Dean)

Mac Miller – GO:OD AM (2015)

- 13. "ROS"
- 16. "Jump" (produced with Badboxes, ID Labs and Sap)

Kelela – Hallucinogen (2015)

- 04. "All the Way Down"

Joe Budden – All Love Lost (2015)

- 13. "Fuck Em All"

Logic – The Incredible True Story (2015)

- 12. "Stainless" (featuring Dria) (produced with Logic and 6ix)

Alex Wiley – *one singular Flame Emoji EP* (2015)

- 03. "Claire" (featuring Pouya)

Raleigh Ritchie – You're a Man Now, Boy (2016)

- 14. "Life in a Box"

Snoh Aalegra – Don't Explain (2016)

- 04. "Home"
- 05. "Don't Explain"

Drake – Views (2016)

- 03. "U with Me?" (additional production; produced by 40 and Kanye West)

Pusha T – "Drug Dealers Anonymous" (2016)

- 01. "Drug Dealers Anonymous"

Lion Babe – Sun Joint

- 09. "Hide + Seek" (produced with Astro Raw)

Denzel Curry – Imperial (Re-Release) (2016)

- 04. "Me Now" (produced with BloodPop)

Jesse Boykins III – bartholomew (2016)

- 01. "Earth Girls

Schoolboy Q – Blank Face LP (2016)

- 12. "Neva Change" (featuring SZA) (produced with Larrance Dopson)

Vince Staples – Prima Donna (2016)

- 03. "Smile" (produced with John Hill)
- 04. "Loco" (featuring Kilo Kish) (produced with John Hill)
- 06. "Prima Donna" (featuring ASAP Rocky)

Mac Miller – The Divine Feminine (2016)

05. "Cinderella" (featuring Ty Dolla Sign) (produced with Aja Grant)

Banks – The Altar (2016)

- 05. "Trainwreck"
- 06. "This Is Not About Us"
- 10. "Haunt"

Lance Skiiiwalker – Introverted Intuition (2016)

- 01. "Forbidden Fruit" (produced with Lance Skiiiwalker and Sounwave)

Kehlani – "Table" (2016)

- 01. "Table" (featuring Little Simz) (produced with Jahaan Sweet and DJ Relly Rell)

Tory Lanez - I told you (2016)

- 20. "Loners Blvd"

Kendrick Lamar – Damn (2017)

- 03. "Yah" (produced with Sounwave and Anthony Tiffith)
- 06. "Loyalty" (featuring Rihanna) (produced with Sounwave, Terrace Martin and Anthony Tiffith)
- 09. "Lust" (produced with Sounwave and BadBadNotGood)
- 11. "XXX" (featuring U2) (produced with Mike Will Made It, Sounwave and Anthony Tiffith)
- 13. "God" (produced with Ricci Riera, Sounwave, Bēkon, Cardo and Anthony Tiffith)

Big Boi – Boomiverse (2017)

- 03. "Mic Jack" (featuring Adam Levine, Scar and Sleepy Brown) (produced with DJ Khalil)

Vic Mensa – The Autobiography (2017)

- 02. "Memories on 47th St." (produced with No I.D. and 1500 or Nothin')

Various Artists – Insecure (Music from the HBO Original Series), Season 2 (2017)

- 19. Quicksand - SZA (produced with Mickey De Grand IV)

Lecrae – All Things Work Together (2017)

- 07. "Come and Get Me" (produced with No I.D.)

Big Sean – I Decided (2017)

- 10. "Voices in My Head/Stick to the Plan" (produced with Metro Boomin)

Various artists – Black Panther (2018)

- 07. "Paramedic!" - SOB X RBE (produced with Cubeatz and Sounwave)

Vince Staples – "Get the Fuck off My Dick" (2018)

- 01. "Get the Fuck off My Dick" (produced with Rittz Reynolds)

Kali Uchis – Isolation (2018)

- 02. "Miami (featuring Bia) (produced with David Andrew Sitek and Om'Mas Keith)

Pac Div – 1st Baptist (2018)

- 04. "Time Will Tell"

Lykke Li – So Sad So Sexy (2018)

- 06. "Sex Money Feelings Die" (produced with Malay)

Kyle – Light of Mine (2018)

- 20. "My Moment" (featuring Wiz Khalifa)

Lupe Fiasco – Drogas Wave (2018)

- 16. "Kingdom" (featuring Damian Marley) (produced with Lupe Fiasco and Oren Yoel)

Denzel Curry – Ta13oo (2018)

- 08. "Sirens | Z1RENZ" (featuring J.I.D) (produced with Billie Eilish)

Mac Miller – Swimming (2018)

- 05. "Self Care" (produced with ID Labs and Nostxlgic)
- 11. "Jet Fuel" (produced with Steve Lacy and Mac Miller)

21 Savage – I Am Greater than I Was (2018)

- 01. "A Lot" (featuring J. Cole)
- 13. "Monster" (featuring Childish Gambino) (produced with TIGGI, Dave Sava6e and Axl Folie)

Vampire Weekend – Father of the Bride (2019)

- 05. "Big Blue" (produced with Ariel Rechtshaid and Ezra Koenig)
- 10. "My Mistake" (produced with Ariel Rechtshaid and Ezra Koenig)
- 20. "I Don't Think Much About Her No More" {Japanese bonus track} (produced with Ariel Rechtshaid)
- 21. "Lord Ullin's Daughter" (featuring Jude Law) {Japanese bonus track} (produced with Ariel Rechtshaid)

Khalid – Free Spirit (2019)

- 08. "Paradise" (produced with John Hill)

Safe – Stay (2019)

- 02. "No Rush"

ScHoolboy Q – CrasH Talk (2019)

- 02. "Tales" (produced with Jake One and G Koop)
- 03. "CHopstix" (featuring Travis Scott)
- 05. "Drunk" (featuring 6LACK) (produced with Sounwave and Bekon)
- 08. "Black Folk" (produced with Jake One)
- 10. "Dangerous" (featuring Kid Cudi)

Nas – The Lost Tapes 2 (2019)

- 09. "War Against Love" (produced with DJ Khalil)

Jidenna – 85 to Africa (2019)

- 01. "Worth the Weight" (featuring Seun Kuti) (produced with Nana Kwabena)

Post Malone – Hollywood's Bleeding (2019)

- 13. "Internet" (produced with Kanye West, BloodPop and Louis Bell)

Mahalia – Love and Compromise (2019)

- 06. "Regular People" (featuring Lucky Daye and Hamzaa) (produced with Felix Joseph)

Earthgang – Mirrorland (2019)

- *08. "Avenue" (produced with Ron Gilmore)

Mike Posner – Keep Going (2019)

- 14. "Amen (KG)"

Wynne – If I May.. (2019)

- 03. "Ego Check" (featuring JID) (produced with DJ OG One)

Wale – The Imperfect Storm (2019)

- 04. "JUNE 5th / QueenZnGodZ" (produced with MClenney, Omega and JonahPH)

Childish Gambino – 3.15.20 (2020)

- 02. "Algorhythm" (produced with Donald Glover and EY)
- 03. "Time" (featuring Ariana Grande) (produced with Donald Glover, Chukwudi Hodge, Ludwig Göransson and Jai Paul)
- 04. "Psilocybae (Millennial Love)" (featuring 21 Savage, Ink and Kadhja Bonet) (produced with Donald Glover)
- 05. "19.10" (produced with Donald Glover, Ludwig Göransson, Chukwudi Hodge and Kurtis McKenzie)
- 06. "24.19" (produced with Donald Glover)
- 07. "32.22" (produced with Donald Glover, Ludwig Göransson, Chukwudi Hodge and Kurtis McKenzie)
- 08. "35.31"
- 11. "47.48" (produced with Donald Glover, Ludwig Göransson and Chukwudi Hodge)
- 12. "53.49" (produced with Donald Glover, James Francies Jr. and Riley Mackin)

J. Warner – Figure 8 (2020)

- 06. "Strawberry Moon"

Wet – "Come to You" (2020)

- 01. "Come to You"

Big Sean – Detroit 2 (2020)

- 02. "Lucky Me" (produced with Teddy Walton, Hit-Boy and Rogét Chahayed)

Jack Harlow – Thats What They All Say (2020)

- .04 "Funny Seeing You Here" (produced with J.LBS, E.Y. and Danny McKinnon)

Omar Apollo – Apolonio (2020)

- 08. "Bi Fren" (produced with Mk.gee and Michael Uzowuru)

Sam Dew – Moonlit Fools (2020)

- 01. "NTWFL" (produced with Sounwave)
- 04. "KILLERS" (produced with Sounwave)
- 08. "Make It Known"

Slim Thug – Thug Life (2020)

- 06. "Both Eyes Open"

J. Cole – The Off-Season (2021)

- 08. "Let Go My Hand" (produced with J. Cole, WU10 and Frank Dukes)

Don Toliver – Life of a Don (2021)

- 08. "Drugs N Hella Melodies" (featuring Kali Uchis) (produced with Sir Dylan and Los Hendrix)

IDK – USee4Yourself (2021)

- 03. "Dogs Don't Lie" (produced with IDK, Blue Rondo and Kurtis McKenzie)

Baby Keem – The Melodic Blue (2021)

- 03. "Scapegoats" (produced with Johnny Kosich, Baby Keem and FnZ)
- 15. "Vent" (produced with Scott Bridgeway, Johnny Kosich, Sounwave, J.LBS and Baby Keem)
- 16. "16" (produced with Jeff Kleinman)

Mac Miller – Faces (Re-release edition) (2021)

- 25. Yeah (produced with Frank Dukes)

Maxo Kream – Weight of the World (2021)

- 09. "What I Look Like" (produced with MynameisNomi, Hamond and Teej)
- 15. "Trips" (produced with Teej)

Yebba – Dawn (2021)

- 06. "Louie Bag" (featuring Smino)

Eli Derby – Left on Read (2022)

- 01. "Gaslight"

Koffee – Gifted (2022)

- 02. "Defend" (produced with CVRE and Sounwave)

Vince Staples – Ramona Park Broke My Heart (2022)

- 03. "DJ Quik" - (produced with Nami and Coop the Truth)
- 09. "Papercuts" - (produced with Hether)

Tanna Leonne – Sleepy Soldier (2022)

- 04. "Nirvana" (produced with Los Hendrix)

Kendrick Lamar – Mr. Morale and the Big Steppers (2022)

- 04. "Die Hard" (featuring Blxst and Amanda Reifer) (produced with Blxst, FnZ, Baby Keem, J.LBS and Sounwave)
- 05. "Father Time" (featuring Sampha) (produced with Grandmaster Vic, Duval Timothy, Bekon, Beach Noise and Sounwave)
- 07. "Rich Spirit" (produced with Frano, Jahaan Sweet and Sounwave)
- 10. "Count Me Out" (produced with Tim Maxey, J.LBS, Kendrick Lamar and Sounwave)
- 18. "Mirror" (produced with Sounwave, Craig Balmoris, Tyler Reese, Bekon, Segiu Gherman)

Brent Faiyaz – Wasteland (2022)

- 03. "Gravity" (featuring Tyler, the Creator)

Steve Lacy – Gemini Rights (2022)

- 03. "Mercury" (produced with Steve Lacy)
- 04. "Buttons" (produced with Steve Lacy)
- 10. "Give You the World" (produced with Steve Lacy)

AG Club – Imposter Syndrome (2022)

- 12. "Mary" (produced with Gabriel Garzón-Montano and Brazzen)

Freddie Gibbs – Soul Sold Separately (2022)

- 15. "Decoded" (featuring Scarface)

Nick Hakim – Cometa (2022)

- 05. "M1" (produced with Nick Hakim)
- 10. "Market" (produced with Nick Hakim)

Smino – Luv 4 Rent (2022)

- 04. "Pro Freak" (featuring Doechii and Fatman Scoop) (produced with Monte Booker, Childish Major, Phoelix and Nami)

SZA – SOS (2022)

- 07. "Used" (featuring Don Toliver)

Ab-Soul – Herbert (2022)

- 07. "Do Better" (featuring Zacari) (produced with Kurtis McKenzie)
- 15. "Church on the Move"
- 17. "Positive Vibes Only"

Don Toliver – Love Sick (2023)

- 12. "If I Had" (featuring Charlie Wilson) (produced with Lamar "MyGuyMars" Edwards)
- 16. "Encouragement" (produced with Lamar "MyGuyMars" Edwards)

Baby Rose - Through and Through (2023)

- 11. "Power" (Produced with Baby Rose, John Key, Bueno, Tane Runo and Slimwav)

Jack Harlow - Jackman (2023)

- 07. "No Enhancers" (produced with Coop The Truth)

Q - Soul,PRESENT (2023)

- 04. "The Hide" (produced with Q)

Maeta - When I Hear Your Name (2023)

- 02. Sexual Love (featuring James Fauntleroy) (produced with Charlotte Day Wilson)

Eem Triplin - Still Pretty (2023)

- 01. "Feel bout me"

Fujii Kaze – Pre-Prema (2023)

- 03. "Workin' Hard"

Chuck Ellis - Nice & Sweet (2025)

- 05. "Done Like That"
