= Time (Childish Gambino song) =

2020 song by Childish Gambino

Single by Childish Gambino featuring Ariana Grande

from the album 3.15.20
- Released: March 27, 2020
- Genre: Psychedelic funk; soul
- Length: 6:07; 5:35 (Atavista version)
- Label: mcDJ
- Songwriters: Donald Glover; Dacoury Natche; Ludwig Göransson; Ariana Grande; Chukwudi Hodge; Sarah Aarons
- Producers: Glover; DJ Dahi; Göransson; Hodge

Childish Gambino singles chronology
"Monster" (2019)	"Time" (2020)	"Psilocybae (Millennial Love)" (2020)

Ariana Grande singles chronology
"Good as Hell" (remix) (2019)	"Time" (2020)	"Stuck with U" (2020)

Audio video
- "Time" on YouTube

"Time" is a song by American singer Donald Glover, under the stage name Childish Gambino, from his fourth studio album 3.15.20 (2020). It was re-recorded and rereleased on the album Atavista (2024). The song features guest vocals by fellow American singer-songwriter Ariana Grande and background vocals by American gospel musician Brent Jones and his backing group The Best Life Singers. It was produced and written by Glover and Grande, along with DJ Dahi, Ludwig Göransson, and Chukwudi Hodge. Australian songwriter Sarah Aarons is also credited for writing and British producer Jai Paul provided miscellaneous production.

The lyrics to "Time" are about being grateful, growing positively, and forgiving past mistakes. Recording of the song took several years, with the production having gone through drastic transformations while the lyrics were left unchanged. It debuted in Glover's 2019 film Guava Island, performed by Karla Talía Pino Piloto and Alain Jonathan Amat Rodriguez. "Time" received mixed reviews with critics being split on the song's lyrics. It peaked at number 21 on the NZ Hot Singles published by Recorded Music NZ.

== Background ==
In 2014, Glover collaborated with American singer Ariana Grande on the track "Break Your Heart Right Back" from her second studio album My Everything. A live version of "Break Your Heart Right Back" was included on the latter's 2019 live album K Bye for Now (SWT Live), with the former credited as a featured artist. In August 2018, American gospel musician Brent Jones revealed that he recorded vocals for Glover's then-upcoming album.

Swedish record producer Ludwig Göransson has been the primary producer on all of Glover's albums since the two met on the set of American television series Community. American record producer DJ Dahi previously worked with Glover on the song "Monster" from rapper 21 Savage's second studio album I Am > I Was (2018). In 2013, British record producer Jai Paul withdrew from the public after his music leaked online. In June 2019, he returned from his six-year hiatus with his debut project Leak 04-13 (Bait Ones) and two new singles "Do You Love Her Now" / "He". "Time" debuted in Glover's 2019 film Guava Island starring Barbadian singer Rihanna. In the film, the song was performed by Karla Talía Pino Piloto and Alain Jonathan Amat Rodriguez.

== Recording and production ==
"Time" originated from the first recording session between Gambino and DJ Dahi. The latter told GQ that it was the song on the album that had the greatest transformation from its initial version. The hook and lyrics were left unchanged, but the song had dark and somber production. DJ Dahi wrote the song's chord melody, after which Göransson was invited to the recording sessions.

American producer Chukwudi Hodge added new drums to the song and Göransson tweaked the song again, making its production brighter. American keyboardist Ely Rise contributed synthesizers to the track. Australian songwriter Sarah Aarons was invited to contribute to the song, after which Grande recorded her vocals. DJ Dahi stated that Paul had "very unique ways" of approaching the song and that his mixing contributed to its sound.

== Composition and lyrics ==
"Time"
Audio sample of Glover's chorus and Grande's verse on "Time". The bright production is contrasted by apocalyptic lyrics. Grande's vocals received both praise and criticism from music critics.

The song is an "easy-going, soulful number." It starts with a steady synthesizer beat. Rowan5215 of Sputnikmusic credited Paul's contributions for the song's lo-fi sound. Gambino and Grande's vocals are varispeed pitched, making them sound "more like voices echoing around a sinking ship than bold, proud superstars." Kara Nesvig, writing for Teen Vogue, described Grande's vocals as "light and airy."

The lyrics of "Time" talk about an impending apocalypse and are about acting now to preserve the future. The lyrics suggest that people be allowed to grow and not be judged by past mistakes, which Consequence of Sound's Okla Jones notes as a bold contrast to cancel culture. The song insists people to be grateful for the opportunities and blessings presented to them. After Grande's verse, a choir sings the chorus. The song slows down and ends with nature sounds of crickets and frogs.

== Release and commercial performance ==
"Time", featuring vocals from Grande, was included in Glover's livestream for his fourth studio album 3.15.20 on March 15, 2020. The song and album were officially released on March 22, 2020. "Time", along with "Algorythm", are the only two tracks on the album with proper names; the rest, such as "12.38", are marked by timestamps. DJ Dahi explained that because the recording process took years, "it can be something that you can't timestamp." Following the re-release of 3.15.20 as Atavista on May 13, 2024, all timestamped tracks were given proper names. "Time" was released as a single to British contemporary hit radio on March 27, 2020. In New Zealand, "Time" peaked at number 21 on the Hot Singles chart published Recorded Music NZ.

== Critical reception ==
Jones called "Time" a gorgeous duet between Glover and Grande. He praised the song's positive lyrics in face of "the social media era." Rowan5215 wrote that the song was "melodically a surefire hit." Tim Sendra, writing for AllMusic, described the song as a "drifting, outer space ballad" and compared it to Scottish rock band Primal Scream's third studio album Screamadelica (1991). Ludovic Hunter-Tilney of the Financial Times wrote that the song "is one of the album’s better moments."

In a more critical review, Pitchfork's Paul A. Thompson cited the hook of "Time" as an example of exasperating writing on 3.15.20. Daniel Schwartz of Complex said Gambino "keeps things PG" on 3.15.20 as if his kids were listening; he cites "Time" as an example, describing the song as "a syrupy number" from Guava Island. British fashion and music magazine Clash wrote that robotic effect on Grande's voice makes her tone irritating.

== Credits and personnel ==
Credits adapted from Tidal.

- Childish Gambino – lead vocals, songwriter, producer
- Ariana Grande – featured vocals, songwriter
- Brent Jones – backing vocals
- The Best Life Singers – backing vocals
- DJ Dahi – producer, songwriter
- Ludwig Göransson – producer, songwriter
- Chukwudi Hodge – producer, songwriter, drums
- Jai Paul – miscellaneous producer
- Sarah Aarons – songwriter
- Ely Rise – keyboards
- Kyle Stephens – recording engineer
- Riley Mackin – recording engineer, mixing engineer
- Mike Bozzi – mastering engineer

Credits for the Guava Island version of "Time" adapted from Pitchfork.

- Karla Talía Pino Piloto – performance
- Alain Jonathan Amat Rodriguez – performance
- Childish Gambino – producer, songwriter
- Ludwig Göransson – producer, songwriter

== Charts ==
Chart (2020)	Peak position
New Zealand Hot Singles (RMNZ)	21

Chart (2024)	Peak position
US Hot R&B Songs (Billboard)	24

== Release history ==
Region	Date	Format	Label	Ref.
Australia	27 March 2020	Contemporary hit radio	Sony Music Entertainment Australia	
United Kingdom	27 March 2020	Contemporary hit radio	Sony	
