= Guava Island =

2019 film directed by Hiro Murai

- Poster
- Directed by: Hiro Murai
- Screenplay by: Stephen Glover
- Story by: Donald Glover; Stephen Glover; Ibra Ake; Jamal Olori; Fam Udeorji
- Produced by: Donald Glover; Fam Udeorji; Carmen Cuba; Jennifer Roth
- Starring: Donald Glover; Rihanna; Nonso Anozie; Letitia Wright
- Cinematography: Christian Sprenger
- Edited by: Isaac Hagy
- Music by: Michael Uzowuru
- Production company: Regency Enterprises
- Distributed by: Amazon Studios
- Release dates: April 11, 2019 (Coachella); April 13, 2019 (United States)
- Running time: 56 minutes
- Country: United States
- Language: English

Guava Island is a 2019 American musical film directed by Hiro Murai (his feature directorial debut) with a screenplay by Stephen Glover and story by Donald Glover, Stephen Glover, Ibra Ake, Jamal Olori and Fam Udeorji. It stars Donald Glover and Rihanna in the lead roles of Deni and Kofi, respectively, and was first exhibited at the Coachella Festival on April 11, 2019. It was then released on April 13, 2019, by Amazon Studios through Amazon Prime Video for anyone to watch without a subscription for 18 hours before being available to Prime subscribers only. In the final hour of the 18 hours, the film was streamed on the Coachella YouTube page and Twitch. Donald Glover was co-headlining at the event as Childish Gambino (his stage name).

== Plot ==
An animated folk tale narrated by Kofi Novia introduces the origins of the fictional Guava Island and the music played by Deni Maroon, a local celebrity who lives with Kofi. She wakes up to Deni playing a tune on his guitar. He rushes out of their house and is greeted by many passersby on the street on his way to work; Deni is holding a music festival that the whole town is looking forward to. He is mugged by a group of kids he knows and convinces them not to rob him by promising them seats up front at the festival.

Kofi works in a factory as a seamstress with Yara (played by Letitia Wright) while Deni works for Red Cargo, owned by a despotic business magnate named Red who employs most of the people on the island. While at work, an employee details what he would do if he were able to emigrate to America, which Deni dismisses as ignorant. Deni is kidnapped and taken to Red's office, who then bribes Deni into canceling his festival to prevent it from interrupting productivity the next day. When Deni questions his power, Red destroys his guitar.

He returns to Kofi, who asks him about his injury and his guitar's absence. Deni brushes off his inquiry, instead serenading her with the song he had promised to write since they were children. Deni suddenly has to go. Later at work, Kofi tells Yara that she is reluctant to tell Deni that she is pregnant because of his free-spirited lifestyle.

Inspired by two children, Zoila and Mapi, Deni performs on the radio again and announces that he will be at the festival. Kofi is ambushed by Red while both look for Deni; Red asks Kofi to tell him to break a leg. Deni starts the festival late and performs a song dedicated to Zoila and Mapi. Kofi spots a masked gunman just before he opens fire on the stage. Deni escapes into an alleyway, but the gunman finds and assassinates him.

Red is pleased, but then he discovers that all of his employees have left work to attend a joyous, blue-themed memorial for Deni; Kofi tells Red that they all finally "got their day". In an epilogue, Kofi starts telling her child a story about how dreams come true.

== Cast ==
- Donald Glover as Deni Maroon, a Cuban musician who "is determined to throw a festival for his island community"
- Rihanna as Kofi Novia, Deni's girlfriend and musical inspiration
- Letitia Wright as Yara Love
- Nonso Anozie as Red, "a shady island tycoon" whose business interests conflict with Deni's festival
- Betiza Bistmark Calderón as Emani Dune
- Yansel Alberto Monagas Pérez as Coley
- Ayensi Amilgar Jardines Delgado as Dodo
- Karla Talía Pino Piloto as Zoila
- Alain Jonathan Amat Rodriguez as Mapi

== Production ==
In August 2018, it had been reported that actors and musicians Donald Glover and Rihanna had been filming a secret project in Cuba titled Guava Island throughout that summer. Glover's Atlanta collaborator Hiro Murai was directing, with Letitia Wright and Nonso Anozie also involved.

== Music ==
The film's score was composed by Michael Uzowuru, with its soundtrack also including several songs performed by Glover as Childish Gambino:

Featured songs
No.	Title	Writer(s)	Producer(s)	Length
1.	"Die With You" (performed by Childish Gambino)	Donald Glover; Dacoury Natche	Glover; DJ Dahi
2.	"Red's Cargo" (performed by Donald Glover and Ernesto Gomez)	Glover
3.	"Dialogo Colombiano" (performed by Afrekete)	Traditional arr. Javier Campos Martinez
4.	"This Is America" (performed by Childish Gambino)	Glover; Ludwig Göransson; Jeffery Williams	Glover; Göransson
5.	"Summertime Magic" (performed by Childish Gambino)	Glover; Göransson	Glover; Göransson
6.	"Baila Mi Rumba" (performed by Julio Gutiérrez)	Francisco Fellove Valdés
7.	"Time" (performed by Karla Talia Pino Piloto and Alain Jonathan Amat Rodriguez)	Glover; Göransson	Glover; Göransson
8.	"Feels Like Summer" (performed by Childish Gambino and Ernesto Gomez)	Glover; Göransson	Glover; Göransson
9.	"Saturday" (performed by Childish Gambino and Deni's Band)	Glover; Göransson	Glover; Göransson
10.	"Die With You" (island version; performed by El Alacran)	Glover; Natche	Glover; Andres Levin

== Release ==
The trailer for the full-length movie premiered on November 24, 2018, at the PHAROS festival in New Zealand. The footage featured Glover singing and strumming a guitar while in the presence of Rihanna, who plays his girlfriend on screen.

On April 5, 2019, advertisements for Guava Island appeared on Spotify indicating something happening on "Saturday Night | April 13". The film debuted at Coachella on April 11, 2019. That same weekend, Glover performed at the Coachella Valley Music and Arts Festival. The 30-second advertisement features Glover singing, and ending with "I'll see you at the show, everyone". Clicking the advertisement leads to the Rap Caviar playlist curated by Spotify, which was "presented by Guava Island" for Spotify users. It was later revealed Amazon Studios would distribute the film, and Regency Enterprises had financed the film, with it being released on April 13.

== Reception ==
As of October 2021, the film holds a 74% approval rating on Rotten Tomatoes, based on 43 reviews with an average rating of 6.6/10. The website's critics consensus reads: "Thematically ambitious if occasionally somewhat obtuse, Guava Island adds another intriguing chapter to a talented team's burgeoning filmography." On Metacritic, it has a weighted average score of 64 out of 100, based on eight reviews, indicating "generally favorable" reviews. It received a nomination for the Critics' Choice Television Award for Best Movie Made for Television.

Peter Debruge of Variety magazine writes "the film serves as a shorter, tighter Purple Rain, a self-mythologizing origin story from the artist formerly known as Childish Gambino, reintroduced here as Deni Maroon." Debruge expresses disappointment that the film features less music than expected and that Rihanna does not sing. He praises the film as it "Plugs squarely into the zeitgeist, answering conflict with a call for love." Joelle Monique of The A.V. Club gave the film a C+, summing up her review: "Short, sweet, and to the point Guava Island proves a catchy little musical number."

In Rolling Stone, Guava Island screenwriter Stephen Glover, Donald's brother, notes a relationship of the plot and themes to the life and recent death of American rapper Nipsey Hussle. He also discusses the "idea of capitalism in America and how it's left people out over the years. But at the same time, it has the power to empower you if you can wield it. The idea of capitalism and the relation that black people especially have to capitalism is something that's interesting to us."

== See also ==
- List of black films of the 2010s
