= Psilocybae (Millennial Love) =

2020 single by Childish Gambino

Single by Childish Gambino featuring 21 Savage, Ink and Kadhja Bonet

from the album 3.15.20
- Released: April 14, 2020
- Genre: Psychedelic hip-hop
- Length: 6:32
- Songwriters: Donald Glover; Dacoury Natche; Shéyaa Bin Abraham-Joseph; Atia "Ink" Boggs; Kadhja Bonet
- Producers: Glover; DJ Dahi

Childish Gambino singles chronology
"Time" (2020)	"Psilocybae (Millennial Love)" (2020)	"Sweet Thang (24.19)" (2020)

21 Savage singles chronology
"Immortal" (2019)	"Psilocybae (Millennial Love)" (2020)	"Secret" (2020)

Audio video
- "Psilocybae (Millennial Love)" on YouTube

"Psilocybae (Millennial Love)", also known as "12.38" and originally titled "Vibrate", is a song by American rapper Donald Glover, performed under the stage name Childish Gambino, from his fourth studio album, 3.15.20 (2020). It was re-recorded and re-released on the album Atavista (2024), where it additionally received its full title. The song features guest vocals by rapper 21 Savage, American singer-songwriter Atia "Ink" Boggs, and American musician Kadhja Bonet. It was written by the artists and DJ Dahi who produced it with Gambino.

Glover sings about a psilocybin-induced trip with a girl who leaves hints about wanting to break up with him. Critics praised the song's comedic narrative and 21 Savage's guest appearance. Under the name "12.38", it peaked at number 22 on the NZ Hot Singles published by Recorded Music NZ. Under the title "Psilocybae (Millennial Love)", it peaked at number 20 on Billboard's Hot R&B Songs chart.

== Background and recording ==
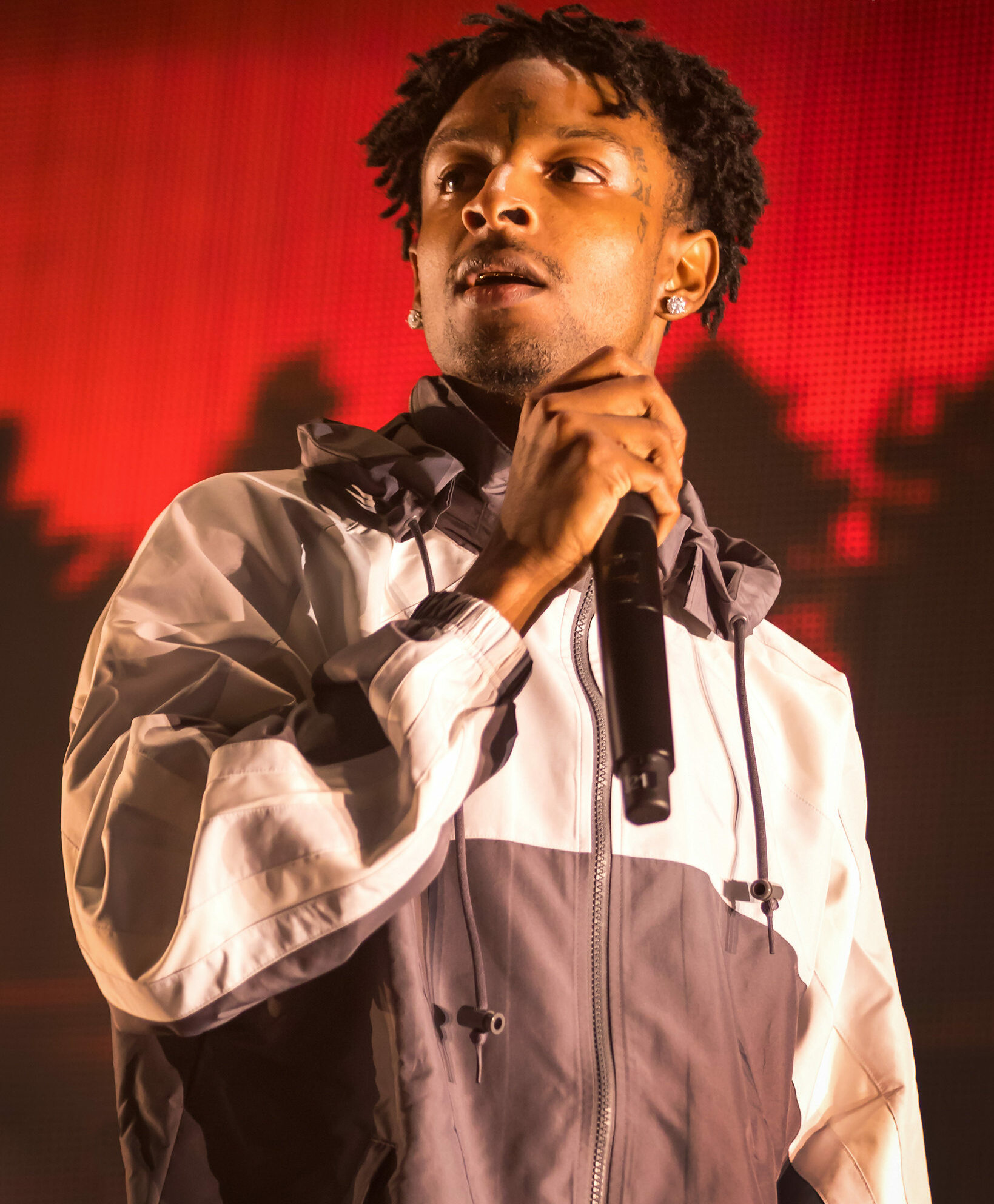
"Psilocybae (Millennial Love)" is the third collaboration between Glover and 21 Savage after their 2018 tracks "This Is America" and "Monster".

Producer DJ Dahi called the creation of the song an evolving process. Dahi had an initial beat with chords provided by Ely Rise. Kadhja Bonet's vocals were for another track, but were chopped and reused for "Psilocybae (Millennial Love)". Dahi described the track as having "funky, odd, but feels good" energy. The song was momentarily put to the side, but Gambino continued writing his verse. Rapper 21 Savage recorded his guest verse and American singer-songwriter Atia "Ink" Boggs was invited to co-write on the song. Glover and 21 Savage previously collaborated in 2018 on the former's single "This Is America" and the track "Monster" from the latter's second studio album I Am > I Was.

== Composition and lyrics ==
"Psilocybae (Millennial Love)"
Audio sample of "Psilocybae (Millennial Love)". Glover sings about a girl feeding him psilocybin, though he is unaware of the drug's effects.

Noah Yoo of Pitchfork described the production of "Psilocybae (Millennial Love)" as a "sensual, minimalistic bounce." The song interpolates André 3000's song "Vibrate". In the song, a girl feeds Glover psilocybin, who is unfamiliar with the psychedelic drug. Sexual tension builds up as his girlfriend keeps texting him, causing his phone to vibrate. Glover uses humorous lines such as "Why your cat looking at me sideways?" in place of a hook and chorus. His verse continues as a beat-by-beat breakdown of the psilocybin use, until he wakes up alone. He name-checks multiple female artists, including Toni Braxton, SZA, and Chaka Khan; he also name-drops American academic bell hooks.

Meanwhile, 21 Savage raps about a side-chick he has at Harvard, as well as about police harassment; he was previously detained by U.S. Immigration and Customs Enforcement in February 2019. 21 Savage also raps about Popeyes' chicken and cartoon character Popeye's spinach.

By the end, the song, at this point featuring vocals from Kadhja Bonet and Ink, "devolves into spirals of vocal echoes" as a result of the psilocybin trip kicking in.

== Release and promotion ==
The song originally surfaced under the unofficial title "Vibrate" when Glover streamed 3.15.20 on his website on March 15, 2020. The track was titled "12.38" upon the album's official release on March 22, 2020. Only the tracks "Algorythm" and "Time" had proper names; the rest, such as "12.38", were marked by their respective timestamps. "12.38" was released as a single to urban adult contemporary radio on April 14, 2020, along with "Sweet Thang (24.19)". A reissue of 3.15.20 was released as Atavista on May 13, 2024, with all timestamped tracks being given finished names; "12.38" became "Psilocybae (Millennial Love)".

== Critical reception ==
Kitty Empire of The Guardian called the song excellent and described it as having "the feel of narrative fiction". Empire stated that the song "could be an episode of Atlanta," an American comedy-drama television series created by Glover. Rowan5215 of Sputnikmusic called the song hilarious and wrote that Glover "[weaponizes] his full range to spin some The Love Below-style seduction." Okla Jones of Consequence of Sound called the song witty and sonically-pleasing as Glover "taps into his prowess as both a writer and a comic." Jones wrote that 21 Savage's verse had Southern charm and was must-needed. Noah Yoo of Pitchfork praised 21 Savage's "particularly on point" guest appearance. Yoo wrote that as the song ends in spiraling echoes, "it's 21's lyrics you’re left thinking about."

== Personnel ==
Credits adapted from Tidal.

- Childish Gambino – lead artist, producer, lyricist, composer
- 21 Savage – featured vocals, lyricist, composer
- Atia "Ink" Boggs – featured vocals, lyricist, composer
- Kadhja Bonet – featured vocals, lyricist, composer
- DJ Dahi – producer, lyricist, composer
- Chukwudi Hodge – drums
- Kurtis McKenzie – drums
- Sam Sugarman – guitar
- Ely Rise – keyboards
- James Francies, Jr. – synthesizers
- Riley Mackin – recording, mixing

== Charts ==
Weekly chart performance for "12.38"
Chart (2020)	Peak position
NZ Hot Singles (Recorded Music NZ)	22

Weekly chart performance for "Psilocybae (Millennial Love)"
Chart (2024)	Peak position
US Hot R&B Songs (Billboard)	20
