= Felix Colgrave =

Australian animator

- Born: Felix Colgrave; 29 November 1992 (age 33); Railton, Tasmania, Australia
- Occupations: Director, animator, cartoonist, filmmaker, artist, musician
- Years active: 2008–present
- Style: Animation, surrealist, absurdist humour

YouTube information
- Channel: FelixColgrave
- Years active: 2008–present
- Genres: Animation; music
- Subscribers: 2.05 million
- Views: 328 million
- Last updated: 6 March 2026
- Musical career
- Genre: Electronic
- Years active: 2018-present
- Label: None
- Website: felix.film

Felix Colgrave (born 29 November 1992) is an Australian director, animator, cartoonist, filmmaker, artist and musician. Distribution of Colgrave's work has, to date, been focused on YouTube where his channel has over 2 million subscribers as of August 2025. Colgrave mainly uses After Effects for his animations. As of March 2026, his most popular animation is "Double King" with over 100 million views.

== Work ==
Colgrave has been involved in several commercial projects, having worked for clients such as Vice and Comedy Central, as well as for Trip Tank and Off the Air series. He provided some in-game animations for Bethesda Softworks' Fallout 4.

Colgrave's YouTube channel has twenty-six of his 2D surreal, psychedelic animations, half of which have over a million views each. His most popular animation, "Double King", has over 100 million views as of May 2026. Colgrave also created the music for "Double King" animation, which he released as an album known as Royal Noises from Dead Kingdoms.

His animation "Man Spaghetti", has been featured on the animation website known as Cartoon Brew Colgrave has directed a number of music videos, including videos for DJ Mustard, Nicki Minaj & Jeremih's "Don't Hurt Me" Fever The Ghost's "SOURCE", and Shoe's "Egg".

He was credited for doing the storyboards for Childish Gambino's music video for "Feels Like Summer."

Colgrave was interviewed at the Sydney Opera House with hosts from Comedy Central and Super Deluxe.

Colgrave and his wife, Zoë Medcraft, operate the production company Wombot Studio out of their garage.

== Awards and recognition ==
The animation "CU" has won the best of the month award on the video-sharing website Vimeo. His follow-up work "Flying Bamboo" was also featured as the opening for the Melbourne International Film Festival.

"The Elephant's Garden" won "Best Australian Film" at the Melbourne International Animation Festival in 2014. It has also gained exposure to the public from various web sources. Both "Double King" and "The Elephant's Garden" are featured in the book titled Australian Animation: An International History.

== Personal life ==
Felix Colgrave has been animating since he was a child. One of his first animations, "Last Resort", was created early in 2008 when he was 15 years old.

Colgrave's wife, Zoë is an animation director, known as Trugglet on Instagram They became engaged on 31 October 2016; On 23 February 2019, Colgrave revealed that he had a child with Zoë. He currently lives in Melbourne, Australia.
