= Drug Dealers Anonymous =

Single by Pusha T featuring Jay-Z
- Released: May 31, 2016
- Recorded: 2016
- Genre: Hip hop
- Length: 3:36
- Label: GOOD; Def Jam
- Songwriters: Terrence Thornton; Dacoury Natche; Shawn Carter; Christopher Dorsey; Terius Gray; Byron Thomas; Tab Virgil; Bryan Williams
- Producer: DJ Dahi

Pusha T singles chronology
"Siri" (2015)	"Drug Dealers Anonymous" (2016)	"Wrist" (2016)

Jay-Z singles chronology
"All the Way Up (Remix)" (2016)	"Drug Dealers Anonymous" (2016)	"I Got the Keys" (2016)

"Drug Dealers Anonymous" is a song by American rapper Pusha T. It was released on May 31, 2016. The hip-hop track was produced by DJ Dahi and features a guest appearance from American rapper Jay-Z.

== Background ==
In an interview with Genius, Pusha T recalled showing the initial version of Drug Dealers Anonymous to frequent collaborator Kanye West, and stated how he wanted "Hov on this." Kanye responded by saying "Oh man. That would be fire." Following this, Pusha T sent an email to Jay-Z, that stated:

The news reporter that called you a 14-year drug dealer, this was the inspiration behind it. Here’s my verse. I left some extra beat for you. Let me know what you think either way.

The news reporter line is in reference to a news section featuring Tomi Lahren, wherein she criticised Jay-Z's wife Beyoncé by bringing up his past of dealing drugs.

Jay-Z responded to Pusha T's initial email, saying:

WTF? Why you taking me to a dark place? Now I’m going to grow my hair out to be on this track with you…

Pusha T responded by saying:

Man, there’s nothing wrong with telling ghost stories. We need them. We love them. We love these things.

After a short break in communication, Jay-Z responded again:

Oh this is going to be bad. Oh this is going to be real, real bad. I’ll just blame it all on you.

After a few more exchanges over email, Jay-Z finished his verse, stating how the verse was "48 bars bad."

== Critical reception ==
In a review for Vibe.com, Shenequa Golding said the song had "a slow sinister feel and provides a warm bed for both lyricist to discuss their former lives." Peter Helman of Stereogum said the song featured "the two stars trading verses over chilly, hard-edged sonics from producer DJ Dahi."

== Composition ==
The song features an interpolation of Bling Bling, which was written by Christopher Dorsey, Terius Gray, Byron Thomas, Tab Virgil, and Byran Williams. This causes them to be listed as songwriters on Drug Dealers Anonymous. The song was produced by DJ Dahi, with additional production credits for Fabian Marasciullo. |-

The song has "slow sinister feel," and that Jay-Z and Pusha T were "trading verses over chilly, hard-edged sonics from producer DJ Dahi."

== Release history ==
Region	Date	Format	Ref.
United States	May 31, 2016	Digital download	
