= Ink (musician) =

American singer, songwriter, and record producer (born 1987)

- Born: Atia Chade Boggs; 1987 (age 38–39); Frankfurt am Main, Germany
- Education: Clark Atlanta University
- Genres: R&B; soul; country rap
- Occupations: Singer; songwriter; guitarist; record producer
- Labels: Big Loud; Electric Feel Records; Mercury

Atia Chade Boggs, known professionally as Ink, is an American singer, songwriter, guitarist, and record producer. She has been credited on singles and albums for Beyoncé, Chris Brown, Justin Bieber, Monica, Kendrick Lamar and Jennifer Lopez, among others.

== Career ==
=== Musical beginnings ===
Boggs, self-taught in guitar, began performing in and around the Buckhead district of Atlanta without any musical industry connections in the late 2000s and early 2010s while a student at Clark Atlanta University. Inspired by The Miseducation of Lauryn Hill, Boggs began to focus on songwriting and formally breaking into the music industry, becoming an early mentee of writer James Fauntleroy through social media platform Facebook in the late 2000s.

=== Initial songwriting success ===
After several years of fruitful sessions with Monica, Chris Brown, Trae tha Truth, and Tamar Braxton, Boggs appeared on Childish Gambino's surprise project 3.15.20 in 2020, which was re-released as Atavista in 2024. In 2021, Boggs contributed to several songs on Leon Bridges' acclaimed album Gold-Diggers Sound, adding her vocals to track "Don't Worry".

=== Beyoncé and GNX ===
In 2022, Boggs contributed to standout tracks "Alien Superstar", "Thique", and "Summer Renaissance" from seventh Beyoncé album Renaissance. In 2024, Boggs contributed several songs to Grammy-winning Beyoncé album Cowboy Carter, including dual lead singles "Texas Hold 'Em" and "16 Carriages", which became the first song by a Black female artist to reach the top of the Billboard Hot Country Songs chart, and another Top 10 Hot Country Songs debut, respectively. Boggs co-wrote five songs in a Nashville writing session with Kacey Musgraves that did not make the album, and one may appear on Boggs' upcoming debut album. In 2024, Boggs also contributed to number-one single "Luther", as well as "Gloria", and "Dodger Blue" on Kendrick Lamar's surprise album GNX.

=== Artist debut ===
In May 2025, Boggs announced that she had signed to independent Nashville label Big Loud, before releasing debut single "Turquoise Cowboy". Her debut project, BIG BUSKIN', described as "a genre-bending mix of country, indie rock, pop, and soul," was released on October 3, 2025.

== Discography ==
=== Albums ===
as INK

Title	Details
BIG BUSKIN'	Released: 03 October 2025; Label: Big Loud; Mercury; Format: Digital download, streaming

=== Songwriting and production credits ===
Credits are courtesy of Discogs, Tidal, Apple Music, and AllMusic.

Title	Year	Artist	Album
"Suga"	2015	Monica	Code Red
"Catfish"	2015	Tamar Braxton	Calling All Lovers
"Very Best" (featuring Mary J. Blige)	2015	Rick Ross	Black Market
"On My Way" (featuring Jacquees)	2015	Plies	Ain’t No Mixtape Bih 2
"My City" (featuring K. Michelle)	2016	Yo Gotti	The Art of Hustle
"Power of Money"	2016	Yo Gotti	White Friday (CM9)
"Powers That Be" (featuring Nas)	2017	Rick Ross	Rather You Than Me
"Made it from Nothing" (featuring Teyana Taylor & Rick Ross)	2017	Meek Mill	Wins & Losses
"Melanin Magic" (featuring Chris Brown)	2018	Remy Ma	
"Back To Love"	2019	Chris Brown	Indigo
"Ride" (featuring Kehlani)	2019	YK Osiris	The Golden Child
"They Ain't Ready"	2019	Becky G	Shelved 2019 English Album
"Intro"	2020	NLE Choppa	From Dark to Light
"Faithfully"	2020	Lyrica Anderson	Bad Hair Day
"Girls Have Fun"	2020	Lyrica Anderson	Bad Hair Day
"Steam"	2021	Leon Bridges	Gold-Diggers Sound
"Magnolias"	2021	Leon Bridges	Gold-Diggers Sound
"Sho Nuff"	2021	Leon Bridges	Gold-Diggers Sound
"Traumada"	2021	Paloma Mami	Sueños de Dalí
"Frenesí"	2021	Paloma Mami	Sueños de Dalí
"Alien Superstar"	2022	Beyoncé	Renaissance
"Thique"	2022	Beyoncé	Renaissance
"Summer Renaissance"	2022	Beyoncé	Renaissance
"Star Walkin' (League of Legends Worlds Anthem)"	2022	Lil Nas X	
"Body Count"	2022	Shenseea	Alpha
"Vibrations"	2022	070 Shake	You Can't Kill Me
"Dark Days" (with Mariah the Scientist)	2024	21 Savage	American Dream
"16 Carriages"	2024	Beyoncé	Cowboy Carter
"Ameriican Requiem"	2024	Beyoncé	Cowboy Carter
"Texas Hold 'Em"	2024	Beyoncé	Cowboy Carter
"Ear Candy" (featuring Coco Jones)	2024	Latto	Sugar Honey Iced Tea
"Look What You Did" (featuring Mariah the Scientist)	2024	Latto	Sugar Honey Iced Tea
"Tell Ur Girlfriend"	2024	Lay Bankz	After 7
"Luther"	2024	Kendrick Lamar & SZA	GNX
"Gloria"	2024	Kendrick Lamar & SZA	GNX
"2.0"	2026	BTS	Arirang

=== Fully-written projects ===
Albums with more than 85% Atia Boggs songwriting credits, showing year released and album name
Album	Artist	Year	Label
This Is Me... Now (Deluxe)	Jennifer Lopez	2024	Nuyorican Productions / BMG

== Guest appearances ==
List of guest appearances, with other performing artists, showing year released and album name
Title	Year	Other performer(s)	Album
"Children of Men"	2015	Trae tha Truth, J. Cole	Tha Truth
"Trying to Figure It Out"	2015	Trae tha Truth	Tha Truth
"I Can't Feel You"	2015	Trae tha Truth	Tha Truth
"Let Me Live"	2016	Trae tha Truth, B.o.B, T.I.	Tha Truth, Pt. 2
"F*** wit Me"	2016	Trae tha Truth	Tha Truth, Pt. 2
"Gateway"	2017	Translee, Young Booke, Tokyo Jetz	We Want Smoke
"Dayz I Prayed"	2018	Trae tha Truth	Hometown Hero
"Don't Check on Me"	2019	Chris Brown, Justin Bieber	Indigo
"Psilocybae (Millennial Love)"	2020	Childish Gambino, 21 Savage, Kadhja Bonet	3.15.20 / Atavista
"Hear Me"	2020	NLE Choppa	From Dark to Light
"Don't Worry"	2021	Leon Bridges	Gold-Diggers Sound
"Cross My Heart"	2021	Andy Mineo	Never Land II
"Real Ain't Real"	2022	Hit-Boy, Dreezy	Hitgirl
"Live For the Night"	2022	Wax Motif, HEX, Daecolm	House of Wax
"Beautiful"	2022	Melodownz	Lone Wolf
"Dodger Blue"	2024	Kendrick Lamar	GNX
"Addicted"	2024	Zerb, The Chainsmokers	N/A
"Guilty"	2026	Meshell Ndegeocello	Synonym

== Awards and nominations ==
Year	Work	Award	Result	Ref
2023	65th Annual Grammy Awards	Album of the Year (Renaissance)	Nominated	
2024	BMI Pop Music Awards	Most Performed Pop Songs ("Star Walkin'")	Won	
2025	67th Annual Grammy Awards	Best Country Song ("Texas Hold 'Em")	Nominated	
2025	67th Annual Grammy Awards	Song of the Year ("Texas Hold 'Em")	Nominated	
2026	68th Annual Grammy Awards	Album of the Year (GNX)	Nominated	
2026	68th Annual Grammy Awards	Song of the Year ("Luther")	Nominated	
