= Summer Pack =

EP by Childish Gambino
- Released: July 11, 2018
- Genre: R&B
- Length: 8:30
- Label: Wolf+Rothstein; Liberator Music; RCA
- Producer: Donald Glover; Ludwig Göransson

Childish Gambino chronology
"Awaken, My Love!" (2016)	Summer Pack (2018)	3.15.20 (2020)

Childish Gambino EP chronology
Kauai (2014)	Summer Pack (2018)

Singles from Summer Pack
- 1. "Summertime Magic" Released: July 11, 2018

Summer Pack is the third extended play by American actor and musician Donald Glover, under his stage name Childish Gambino. It was released by Wolf+Rothstein, Liberator Music and RCA Records on July 11, 2018. It contains only two songs, "Summertime Magic" and "Feels Like Summer". The EP was produced by Glover and his longtime collaborator, Ludwig Göransson. It was revealed to the public via social media shortly after its release in a surprise manner.

== Background and release ==
Following the release of his 2016 album "Awaken, My Love!" and the 2018 re-issue of his debut project EP, Glover released the hit single "This Is America", which became both his first number one and top ten song on the US Billboard Hot 100. The track also reached number one on the charts of Australia, Canada and New Zealand, and peaked within the top ten of the charts in eight other countries. The song was nominated for four Grammy Awards at the 61st Annual Grammy Awards and won two. Two months following the release of the hit single, Gambino announced the surprise release of the two-song EP Summer Pack on July 11, 2018 featuring the songs "Summertime Magic" and "Feels Like Summer".

Both songs appear in the 2019 film Guava Island, which stars Donald Glover, and features other music from Childish Gambino.

== Track listing ==
Both tracks written and produced by Donald Glover and Ludwig Göransson. Credits adapted from Tidal.

No.	Title	Length
1.	"Summertime Magic"	3:33
2.	"Feels Like Summer"	4:57
Total length:		8:30

== Release history ==
Region	Date	Format(s)	Label	Ref.
Various	July 11, 2018	Digital download; streaming	Wolf+Rothstein; Liberator Music; RCA	
