= Childqueen =

Studio album by Kadhja Bonet
- Released: June 8, 2018
- Length: 37:14
- Label: Fat Possum

Kadhja Bonet chronology
The Visitor (2016)	Childqueen (2018)

Singles from Childqueen
- 1. "Mother Maybe" Released: March 30, 2018; 2. "Another Time Lover" Released: May 29, 2018

Professional ratings
Aggregate scores
Source	Rating
Album of the Year	79/100
AnyDecentMusic?	7.6/10
Metacritic	82/100
Review scores
Source	Rating
AllMusic	4.5/5 stars
Exclaim!	9/10
The Line of Best Fit	7/10
Loud and Quiet	6/10
Pitchfork	7.7/10
PopMatters	8/10

Childqueen is the second studio album by American musician Kadhja Bonet. It was released on June 8, 2018, under Fat Possum Records. The album received positive reviews and charted in the US Billboard's Independent Albums and Heatseekers Albums.

== Production ==
The album was recorded over two years in cities across Europe.

== Release ==
On March 30, 2018, Bonet announced the release of her second album, along with the single "Mother Maybe".

The second single, "Another Time Lover", was released on May 29, 2018. The single is described as blending "subtle distorted electronica with Bonet's delicate vocals, as it daintily morphs into a retro-tinged track.

== Critical reception ==
Childqueen was met with "universal acclaim" reviews from critics. At Metacritic, which assigns a weighted average rating out of 100 to reviews from mainstream publications, this release received an average score of 82 based on 10 reviews. Aggregator Album of the Year gave the release a 79 out of 100 based on a critical consensus of 12 reviews.

Andy Kellman of AllMusic said the album "mixes folk and soul to spellbinding effect, provoking numerous flattering comparisons yet without possibly being mistaken for any one of them. Illustrated with billowing strings and dancing woodwinds over a delightfully warped rhythm section." Speaking for Exclaim!, Anna Alger gave the album nine out of ten, noting "Childqueen demands patience and a receptive ear to pick up on the care and detail Bonet has taken in crafting every moment."

=== Accolades ===
Accolades for Childqueen
Publication	Accolade	Rank
The 405	The 405's Top 50 Albums of 2018	8
AllMusic	AllMusic's Best of 2018	N/A
AllMusic	AllMusic's Best R&B Albums of 2018	N/A

== Track listing ==
Childqueen track listing
No.	Title	Length
1.	"Procession"	2:52
2.	"Childqueen"	3:11
3.	"Another Time Lover"	3:38
4.	"Delphine"	5:54
5.	"Thoughts Around Tea"	2:12
6.	"Joy"	4:07
7.	"Wings"	4:03
8.	"Mother Maybe"	4:15
9.	"Second Wind"	4:15
10.	"Nostalgia"	2:47

== Charts ==
Chart performance for Childqueen
Chart (2018)	Peak position
US Independent Albums (Billboard)	48
US Heatseekers Albums (Billboard)	15
