= 16 Carriages =

2024 single by Beyoncé

Single by Beyoncé

from the album Cowboy Carter
- Written: c. 2020
- Released: February 11, 2024
- Studio: Dezert Flower; Kings Landing West; Parkwood West; Record Plant (Los Angeles); The Trailer (East Hampton, New York)
- Genre: Country
- Length: 3:47 (album version); 3:54 (radio edit)
- Label: Parkwood; Columbia
- Songwriters: Beyoncé; Atia Boggs; Dave Hamelin; Stephanie Mensah; Raphael Saadiq
- Producers: Beyoncé; Ink; Dave Hamelin

Beyoncé singles chronology
"My House" (2023)	"16 Carriages" and "Texas Hold 'Em" (2024)	"II Most Wanted" (2024)

Visualizer
- "16 Carriages" on YouTube

"16 Carriages" is a song by American singer and songwriter Beyoncé from her eighth studio album, Cowboy Carter. It serves as the album's joint lead single alongside "Texas Hold 'Em". The song was a surprise release and debuted during Super Bowl LVIII on February 11, 2024, through Parkwood Entertainment and Columbia Records.

"16 Carriages" is a country ballad about growing up and the relationship between parents and their children. Various music critics praised the song for its musical expression and Beyoncé's melodious vocals. At the 67th Annual Grammy Awards it was nominated for Best Country Solo Performance. Commercially the song debuted at number nine on Billboard's Hot Country Songs chart, becoming Beyoncé's second top-ten entry.

== Background and release ==
Verizon, an American multinational telecommunications company, released a short Super Bowl teaser with American actor and comedian Tony Hale squeezing lemons, referencing Beyoncé's sixth studio album, Lemonade (2016). Another teaser commercial was released featuring Hale and the horse depicted on the cover of Beyoncé's seventh studio album, Renaissance (2022).

Throughout the Super Bowl LVIII, a minute-long commercial was released with Tony Hale challenging Beyoncé to break "Verizon's 5G internet service." During the commercial, Beyoncé attempts to break the internet by running a lemonade stand, releasing a jazz saxophone album, launching a "Barbie" doll collection, announcing her presidential campaign, and flying into space for a performance. Shortly after the commercial aired, Beyoncé posted a video teaser on Instagram with an unidentified woman starting up a car and driving afar on an empty road. The same day, the artist's official website was updated to announce her eighth studio album, Act II. The album's two lead singles, "16 Carriages" and "Texas Hold 'Em", were surprise released for digital download and streaming.

The track was written when Beyoncé was 38, likely the summer of 2020.

== Composition ==
The song is a country ballad written in the key of C♯ major with percussion instrument and steel pulse; thematically the lyric provides reflection about "growing-up", linked to the evolving relationship between parents and their children.

The song was co-produced by Beyoncé Knowles, alongside Atia Boggs and Dave Hamelin; it was co-written by Knowles, Boggs, Hamelin, and Raphael Saadiq. Robert Randolph and Justin Schipper were credited as the players of the steel guitar. Beyoncé wore a hat designed by Gladys Tamez, named "Houston" for her digital cover art.

In an interview for Rolling Stone, Randolph explained the recording session in Los Angeles with Beyoncé, Rhiannon Giddens, Saadiq and Khirye Tyler:

When we did the first session, [...] Beyoncé already had an idea of what she wanted to do. She wanted to do something with some playing, with some country fire. [...] It's great for her to go this route. In country music for a longest time, it almost seemed like it was supposed to be out of left field when a Black artist says, 'Hey, I'm going to do a country record.'

— Robert Randolph, in an interview with Rolling Stone about "16 Carriages" composition.

== Critical reception ==
"16 Carriages" received widespread acclaim from music critics. (Note: Attributed to Clash Magazine's Shahzaib Hussain, Consequence's Mary Siroky, Vulture's Craig Jenkins, and The Times's Will Hodgkinson.) Chris Willman of Variety stated that the song is lyrically associable with Beyoncé's "Daddy Lessons" song from her sixth studio album, Lemonade (2016), for its reflective "overt growing-up narrative" and for exploring "daddy issues", even if the song is "mostly just about having become a workhorse that got rode too hard before she had a chance to be a teenager". Gail Mitchell of Billboard wrote that the song is "a vulnerable yet empowering autobiographical ballad" with "melodious vocals". Talking about the title, Mitchell suggested that the number "16" could refer to the age when Beyoncé signed with Columbia as a Destiny's Child member.

In a four-out-of-five review, Ben Beaumont-Thomas of The Guardian described the song as a "'Halo'-proportioned" country song with "blues and gospel-infused", in which Beyoncé is singing about "the graft of her career since her mid-teens". The writer stressed that it could "recalls the [Black] work song" for "claiming country as part of Black musical expression". Ben Sisario of The New York Times described the song as "an epic ballad" with the guitars swelling between the "organ-loud percussion" as the artist sings about losing innocence "at a young age." Maria Sherman of The San Diego Union-Tribune described the song as "a soulful slow-burn" in which Beyoncé sings "an ode to hard work and legacy".

In a less positive review, Chris Richards of The Washington Post found that "16 Carriages" and "Texas Hold 'Em" were released as a pair "because neither could stand on its own" and had less impact than the previous lead singles "Formation" or "Break My Soul". The writer wrote that both the songs "feel dull, dry, unimaginative, unnecessary, unconfident and uncool."

== Commercial performance ==
"16 Carriages" debuted at number nine on Billboard's Hot Country Songs chart, becoming Beyoncé second top-ten entry appearing simultaneously on the chart with "Texas Hold 'Em", which debuted at one.

== Live performances ==
=== 2024 NFL Halftime show ===
On December 25, 2024, Beyoncé debuted "16 Carriages" live as the opening song of her 2024 NFL Halftime Show set list.

=== Cowboy Carter Tour ===
Beyoncé included "16 Carriages" as part of the Cowboy Carter Tour, singing on a flying car across the audience every show. It was subsequently replaced with a Golden Mechanical Horse beginning with the Atlanta show after the car malfunctioned during a tour stop in Houston.

== Accolades ==
Awards and nominations
Organization	Year	Category	Result	Ref.
People's Choice Country Awards	2024	The Female Song of 2024	Nominated	
People's Choice Country Awards	2024	The Storyteller Song of 2024	Nominated	
NAACP Image Awards	2025	Outstanding Soul/R&B Song	Nominated	
Grammy Awards	2025	Best Country Solo Performance	Nominated	

== Personnel and credits ==
Performers

- Vocals by Beyoncé

Musicians

- Atia "INK" Boggs – guitars
- Lemar Carter – drums
- Dave Hamelin – piano, organ, synths, guitars
- Robert Randolph – steel guitar
- Justin Schipper – steel guitar
- Ryan Svendsen – trumpet
- Justus West – guitars
- Gavin Williams – organ

Technical credits

- Beyoncé – production, vocal production
- Atia "INK" Boggs – production
- Matheus Braz – engineering assistance
- Dave Hamelin – production, recording engineering
- Hotae Alexander Jang – recording engineering
- Colin Leonard – mastering engineering
- Andrea Roberts – Pro Tools engineering
- Raphael Saadiq – additional production
- Stuart White – additional production, Beyoncé vocal recording, mixing engineering

== Charts ==
=== Weekly charts ===
Weekly chart performance
Chart (2024)	Peak position
Australia (ARIA)	85
Canada Hot 100 (Billboard)	56
France (SNEP)	128
Global 200 (Billboard)	40
Ireland (IRMA)	57
New Zealand Hot Singles (RMNZ)	9
Portugal (AFP)	89
Sweden Heatseeker (Sverigetopplistan)	7
UK Singles (Official Charts)	44
US Billboard Hot 100	38
US Hot Country Songs (Billboard)	9

=== Year-end charts ===
2024 year-end chart performance
Chart (2024)	Position
US Hot Country Songs (Billboard)	86

== Certifications ==
Region	Certification	Certified units/sales
Brazil (Pro-Música Brasil)	Platinum	40,000^{‡}
United States (RIAA)	Gold	500,000^{‡}
^{‡} Sales+streaming figures based on certification alone.

== Release history ==
Release dates and formats
Region	Date	Format(s)	Label(s)	Ref.
Various	February 11, 2024	Digital download; streaming	Parkwood; Columbia	
