= Spenzo =

- Born: Demauris Merchant Johnson; June 11, 1995 (age 31); Chicago, Illinois, U.S.
- Genres: Hip hop; drill; gangsta rap; punk rap; hardcore hip hop
- Occupations: Rapper; singer; songwriter
- Years active: 2012-present
- Label: Atlantic Records

Demauris Merchant Johnson (born June 11, 1995), better known by his stage name Spenzo, is an American rapper from Chicago. Spenzo is best known from his single "Wife 'Er" and from his collaborations with artists such as Young Thug, G Herbo and King Louie.

== Career ==
In 2013, Spenzo released his breakthrough single "Wife 'Er", which was a freestyle recorded over an instrumental produced by Chicago producer Young Chop. Later in the year, he signed a record deal with Atlantic Records and released singles such as "Heaven Can Wait", calling for an end to the gang violence in Chicago.

In 2014 Drake performed Spenzo's single "Wife 'Er" at the Chicago stop of his Drake Vs. Lil Wayne tour, he also released "I'm So Sorry" in collaboration with Young Thug. Later in the year, Hip Hop artists Meek Mill and Maine Man released an alternative version of Spenzo's Young Thug collaboration, "I'm So Sorry".

In 2015, alongside Chicago artist King Louie, Spenzo released their single "Effortlessly". and a collaboration with Tree titled "Doin Lines".

Throughout 2016, Spenzo released singles such as "Big Amount and a collaboration with Hip Hop artist G-O, titled "Set The Mood". In 2017, Spenzo released projects such as his album "Say No Mo" as well as a single featuring his brother Nuskie and Scoota Bussin titled "Thought It Was". In 2018, Spenzo released singles such as "Still Winter" and "Yesterday", which was produced by ChopSquadDivnci. Throughout 2019, Spenzo released singles such as "Swerve" and remixed Kodak Black's single "Calling My Spirit" as well as J Cole's single "Middle Child".

In 2022, Spenzo released singles such as "Bigg Steppa", a collaboration with Chicago Hip Hop artist Bigga$tate, produced by Mafia Beatz. The single, released through Firehouse Studios was also featured on the No Jumper platform. Later in the year, Spenzo, alongside Moncler Moon Boy & CP released their single "TFMB", which was produced by Mafia Beatz.

== Legal Issues ==
On June 2, 2018, Spenzo was arrested for unlawful use of a weapon when police pulled over the vehicle he was in for speeding. Upon searching the vehicle police found Marijuana and a loaded .380 caliber Taurus pistol.

== Abduction ==
On February 14, 2023, Spenzo was the victim of a kidnapping and assault which reportedly stemmed from a social media argument with a rival gang member and fellow Chicago rapper known as Kiddo Curry.

== Discography ==
- Wife 'Er (2013)
- Chicago Conscious (2014) Featuring King Louie (rapper), G Herbo & Reem
- I'm So Sorry (2014) Featuring Young Thug
- Doin Lines (2015) Featuring Tree
