= Brent Jones (musician) =

- Born: Brent Ray Jones; May 7, 1966 (age 60); Los Angeles, California
- Genres: CCM, Christian R&B, gospel, Christian hip hop, traditional black gospel, contemporary R&B, urban contemporary gospel
- Occupations: Singer, songwriter, pianist
- Instruments: vocals, singer-songwriter, piano
- Years active: 1992–present
- Labels: Majestic, EMI, Tyscot, Echopark
- Website: lovebrentjones.com

Brent Ray Jones (born May 7, 1966) is an American gospel songwriter, singer, pianist, and choir conductor. He started his music career in 1999, with the release of Brent Jones & the T.P. Mobb under Holy Roller Entertainment, which charted on three Billboard magazine charts. His second album (Beautiful) came out in 2002 with EMI GMG Records, and charted three charts. The third album, The Ultimate Weekend, released in 2007 by Tyscot Records, and this placed on the Billboard magazine Gospel Albums chart. He released, Joy Comin', in 2014 with Echopark Records, and this placed upon the Gospel Albums chart.

== Early life ==
Jones was born on May 7, 1966 in Los Angeles, California, as Brent Ray Jones, and he commenced his piano lessons to become a pianist at the age of six. He was installed as the music director and minister of his church at 14 years old.

== Music career ==
Brent Jones formed the choir, the T.P. Mobb in 1992, with the music recording career coming to display in 1999, with the release of Brent Jones & the T.P. Mobb by Majestic Recordings on June 22, 1999, and this album placed upon three Billboard magazine charts, which were the Gospel Albums at No. 4, R&B Albums chart at No. 37, and No. 17 on the Heatseekers Albums chart. The subsequent album, Beautiful, was released on April 9, 2002, by EMI CMG Records, and this placed on the Gospel Albums at No. 7, R&B Albums at No. 35, and Heatseekers Albums at No. 19. He released, The Ultimate Weekend, with Tyscot Records on October 9, 2007, and this placed upon the Gospel Albums chart at No. 14. The fourth album, Joy Comin', was released by Echopark Records in 2014, and this charted on the Top Gospel Albums at No. 6.

== Discography ==
List of selected studio albums, with selected chart positions
Title	Album details	Peak chart positions		
Title	Album details	US Gos	US R&B	US Heat
Brent Jones & The T.P. Mobb	Released: June 22, 1999; Label: Holy Roller Entertainment; CD, digital download	4	37	17
Beautiful	Released: April 12, 2002; Label: /HolyRoller/EMI; CD, digital download	7	35	19
The Ultimate Weekend	Released: October 9, 2007; Label: Tyscot; CD, digital download	14	–	–
Joy Comin'	Released: 2014; Label: Echopark; CD, digital download	6	–	–
Open Your Mouth And Say Something	Released: 2019; Label: JDI Records; CD, digital download	3	_	_
