= Feels Like Summer (Childish Gambino song) =

Promotional single by Childish Gambino

from the EP Summer Pack and the album 3.15.20
- Released: July 11, 2018
- Genre: R&B
- Length: 4:57 (EP version); 5:21 (album version)
- Label: Wolf+Rothstein; Liberator Music; RCA
- Songwriters: Donald Glover; Ludwig Göransson
- Producers: Glover; Göransson

Music video
- "Feels Like Summer" on YouTube

"Feels Like Summer", also known as "42.26", is a song by American recording artist Childish Gambino. The song was released by Wolf+Rothstein, Liberator Music and RCA Records on July 11, 2018. The R&B track was written and produced by Gambino and his longtime collaborator Ludwig Göransson. The song was made available for digital download and streaming along with "Summertime Magic" as a part of the extended play Summer Pack. It later appeared on his fourth album, 3.15.20, under the title "42.26".

Upon its release, the promotional single charted at number 54 on the Billboard Hot 100 and number 25 on the Hot R&B/Hip-Hop Songs chart. The song peaked at number 9 on the New Zealand Hot Singles chart, and also made charts in Australia, Belgium, Canada, Ireland, Portugal, Scotland, and the United Kingdom. The song was also certified 2× Platinum by the Recording Industry Association of America (RIAA), and was also certified Platinum in both Australia and New Zealand.

Its music video, released on the 1st of September, 2018, was directed by Glover himself, alongside Ivan Dixton and Greg Sharp. It features Gambino walking through a street containing numerous popular rappers. As of 2025, the video has garnered over 346,000,000 views and 3,300,000 likes. In 2019, the song received a Grammy nomination for Best R&B Song at the 61st Annual Grammy Awards. The track is also featured on the soundtrack to FIFA 19 (2018).

== Commercial performance ==
In the United States, the song charted at number 54 on the Billboard Hot 100 and number 25 on the Hot R&B/Hip-Hop Songs chart. It was also certified 2× Platinum by the Recording Industry Association of America (RIAA) for equivalent sales of 2,000,000 units in the United States. In Australia, the song charted at number 79 on the ARIA Charts and was certified Platinum by the Australian Recording Industry Association (ARIA) for equivalent sales of 70,000 units in the country. In Belgium, the song charted at number 13 on the Ultratip Bubbling Under chart in Flanders. In Canada, the song charted at number 47 on the Canadian Hot 100 and was certified Gold by Music Canada (MC) for equivalent sales of 40,000 units in the country.

In Ireland, the song charted at number 51 on the Irish Singles Chart. In New Zealand, the song charted at number 9 on the New Zealand Hot Singles chart, its highest position on any chart it reached. It was also certified Platinum by Recorded Music New Zealand (RMNZ) for equivalent sales of 30,000 units in the country. In Poland, although the song did not chart, it was certified Gold by the Polish Society of the Phonographic Industry (ZPAV) for equivalent sales of 10,000 units in the country. In Portugal, the song charted at number 76 on the Portuguese Singles Chart and was certified Gold by Associação Fonográfica Portuguesa (AFP) for equivalent sales of 5,000 units in Portugal. In Scotland, the song charted at number 71 on the Scottish Singles Chart. In the United Kingdom, the song charted at number 64 on the UK Singles Chart and was certified Gold by the British Phonographic Industry (BPI) for equivalent sales of 400,000 units in the country.

== Music video ==
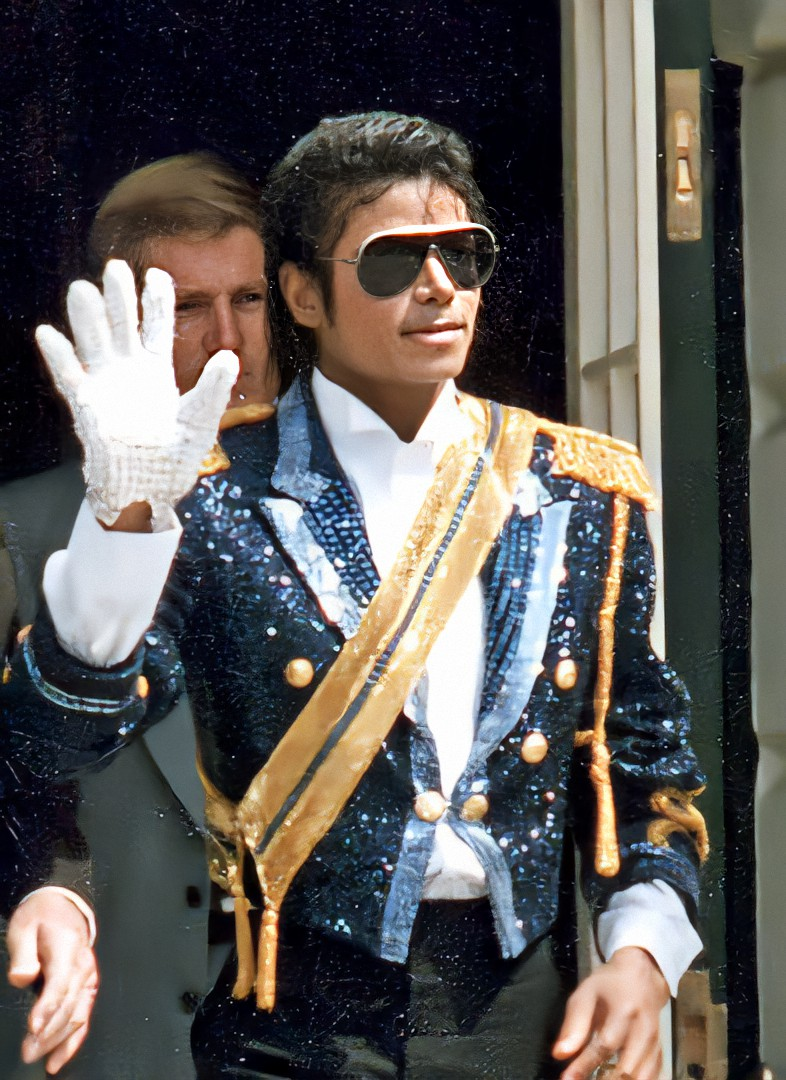
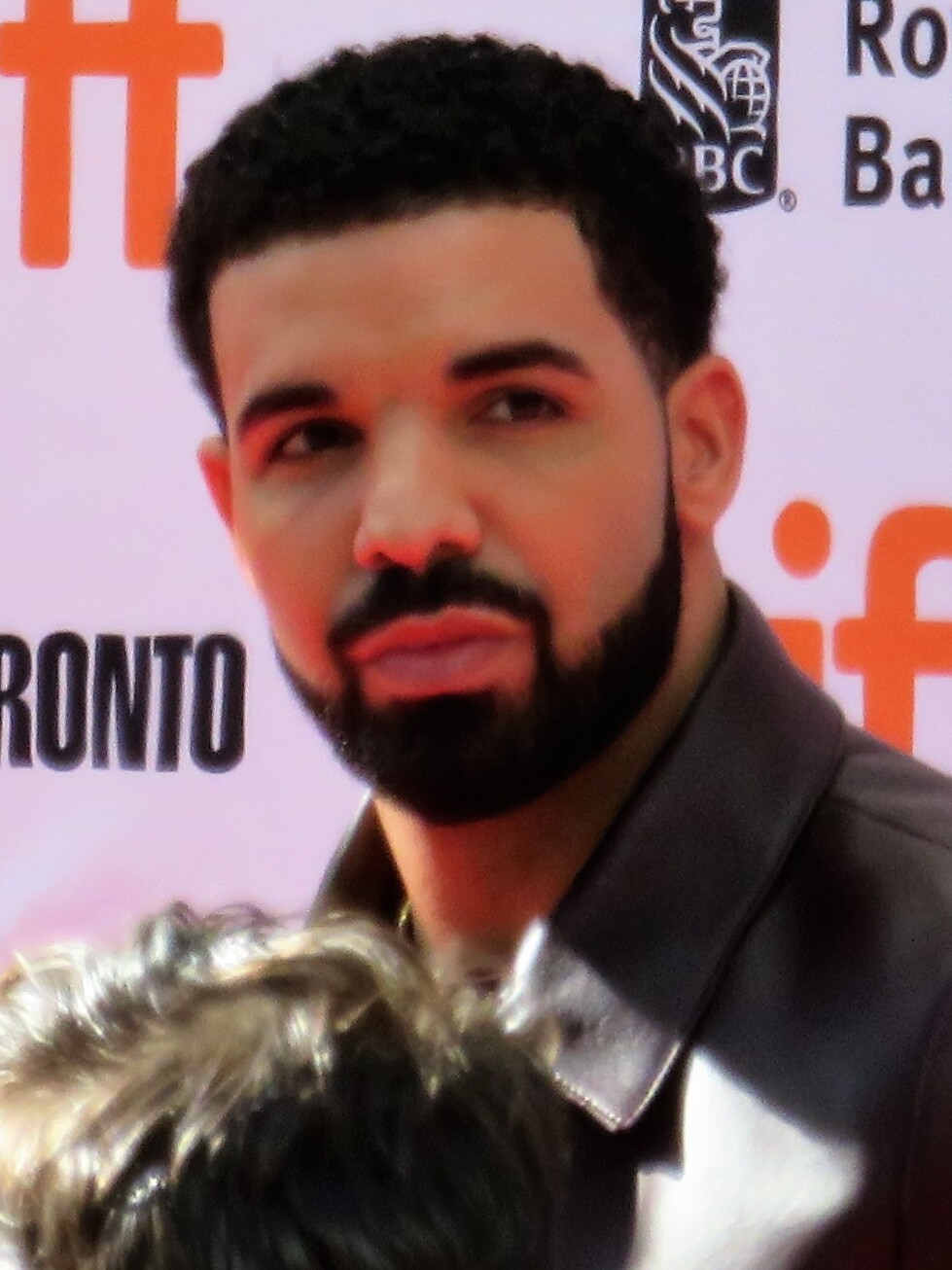
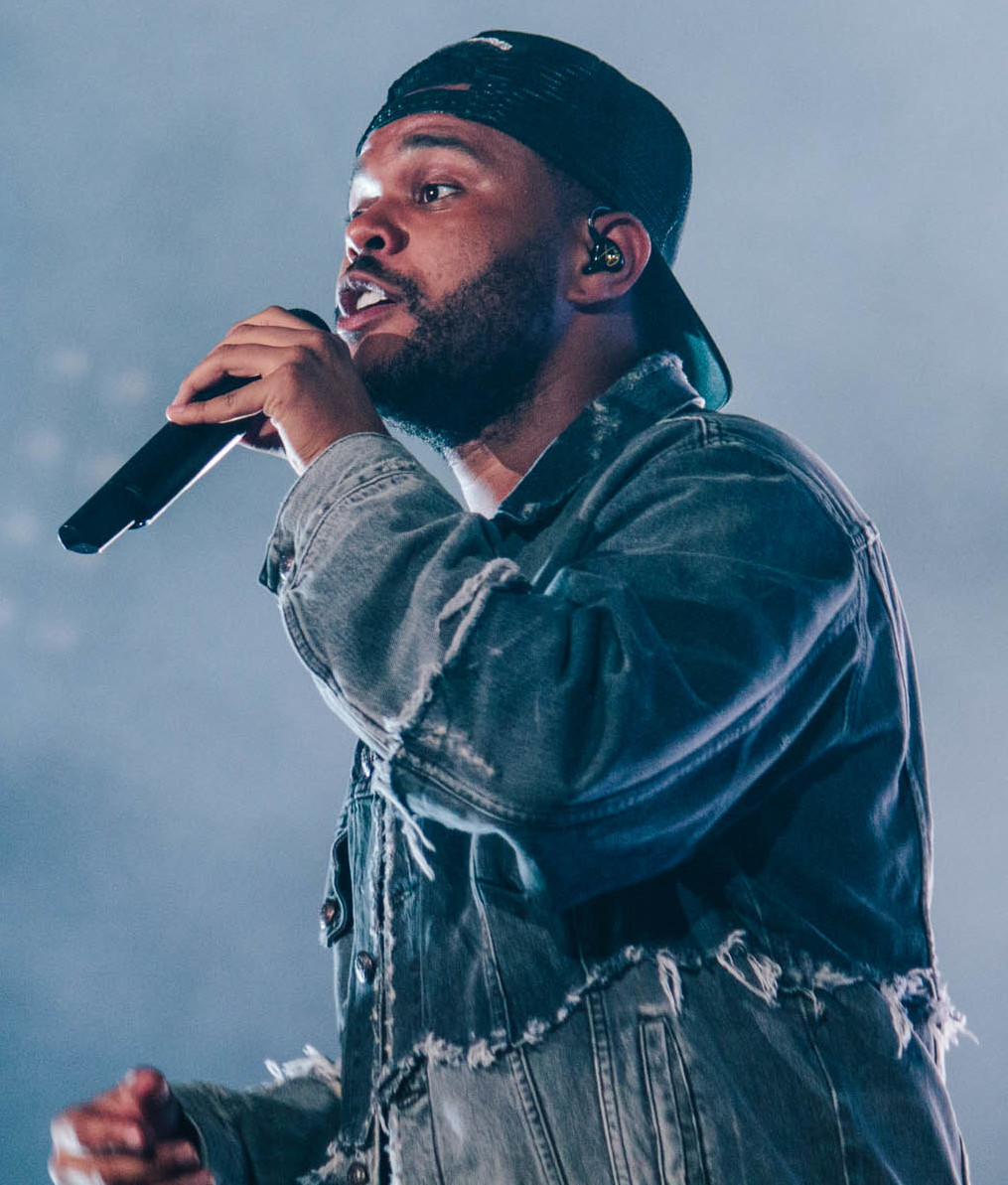
Various black musicians such as Michael Jackson, Drake and the Weeknd make cameo appearances on "Feels Like Summer" as animated characters.

A music video for "Feels Like Summer" was released on September 1, 2018. It was directed by Glover, Ivan Dixon and Greg Sharp. In the animated video, Gambino walks calmly through a neighborhood watching all of his neighbors playing during the summer as well as stopping to have dream sequences. The neighbors are all famous rappers, R&B singers or modern black figures that consist of (in order and group):

- Lil Pump and Trippie Redd running around the neighborhood
- 21 Savage and Metro Boomin smoking in a car
- Kodak Black sticking his head out of the window to turn away Pump and Redd
- Migos playing basketball
- Birdman grilling while Chance the Rapper watches Jaden Smith playing
- Will Smith washing his car while Azealia Banks sits above him in a tree
- Nicki Minaj playing with blocks as Travis Scott knocks them over
- The Weeknd, Ty Dolla $ign and Frank Ocean playing tug of war against ASAP Rocky, Solange and Willow Smith
- Soulja Boy speaking with Pump and Redd
- Future riding away on a bike from Drake, who chases after him
- Kid Cudi standing silent and dejected
- Kanye West, crying while wearing a Make America Great Again hat, and being comforted by Michelle Obama
- Beyoncé wearing a shirt paying tribute to Fredo Santana
- Andrew Gillum (or Shannon Sharpe) with a melting cup of ice cream representing XXXTentacion
- Lil Uzi Vert and Zendaya (or Kehlani) having their hair done by Oprah Winfrey and Tiffany Haddish
- Lil Yachty and Charlamagne Tha God eating popsicles
- Gucci Mane laying on his back relaxing
- Dr. Dre, Sean Combs, Snoop Dogg, Wiz Khalifa and Jay-Z dancing next to Mane
- Lonzo, LiAngelo and LaMelo Ball playing a video game while Young Thug does the same behind them
- 2 Chainz taking a group shot of Meek Mill, Pusha T and Lil Wayne
- Rae Sremmurd blasting water guns at the past three and J. Cole
- Janelle Monáe and SZA skateboarding
- Chris Brown crying
- Outkast (Big Boi and André 3000) facing away from each other, possibly representing their breakup
- Rihanna floating in a crossed leg pose
- Whitney Houston ("So Emotional" single cover, 1987)
- Michael Jackson (circa the 1970s)

The large amount of celebrities featured in the music video is juxtaposed against the environmentally-focused lyrics of the song, a contrast seen by some as deliberate; the video distracts from the song, in similar fashion to how some are so focused on celebrities and their personal lives that they forget more pressing issues in the world, such as climate change. This is not too dissimilar from the music video to Gambino's earlier 2018 hit, ‘This Is America’, where Gambino and a crew of backup dancers perform distracting, choreographed dances and shooting a church choir while the background of the video and lyrics to the song are loaded with political commentary and carnage.

A follow-up video shows the animated Gambino walking into his house (which seems to partially resemble, or at least invoke, Mister Rogers' Neighborhood) and taking off his shoes to a new pair of Adidas. This was used to announce Glover's role as an ambassador and "brand co-creator" for the corporation.

== Sébastien Tellier cover ==
French musician Sébastien Tellier released a cover of "Feels Like Summer", titled "Feels Like Summer – Souvenirs d'été", on July 2, 2020, exclusively for the French streaming service Deezer.

== Personnel ==
Credits adapted from Tidal.

- Donald Glover – production, mix engineering
- Ludwig Göransson – production
- Riley Mackin – mix engineering, master engineering, record engineering
- Justin Richburg - character design, animation
- Felix Colgrave - production, animation
- Jessica Maffia - single art

== Charts ==
Chart (2018)	Peak position
Australia (ARIA)	79
Belgium (Ultratip Bubbling Under Flanders)	13
Canada Hot 100 (Billboard)	47
Ireland (IRMA)	51
New Zealand Hot Singles (RMNZ)	9
Portugal (AFP)	76
Scottish Singles Sales (Official Charts)	71
UK Singles (Official Charts)	64
US Billboard Hot 100	54
US Hot R&B/Hip-Hop Songs (Billboard)	25

== Certifications ==
Region	Certification	Certified units/sales
Australia (ARIA)	Platinum	70,000^{‡}
Canada (Music Canada)	Gold	40,000^{‡}
France (SNEP)	Gold	100,000^{‡}
Poland (ZPAV)	Gold	10,000^{‡}
Portugal (AFP)	Gold	5,000^{‡}
New Zealand (RMNZ)	Platinum	30,000^{‡}
United Kingdom (BPI)	Gold	400,000^{‡}
United States (RIAA)	2× Platinum	2,000,000^{‡}
^{‡} Sales+streaming figures based on certification alone.

== Release history ==
Region	Date	Format	Label	Ref.
Various	July 11, 2018	Digital download; streaming	Wolf+Rothstein; Liberator Music; RCA	
