= Summertime Magic =

Single by Childish Gambino

from the EP Summer Pack
- Released: July 11, 2018
- Genre: R&B
- Length: 3:33
- Label: Wolf+Rothstein; Liberator Music; RCA
- Composers: Donald Glover; Ludwig Göransson
- Lyricist: Donald Glover
- Producers: Donald Glover; Ludwig Göransson

Childish Gambino singles chronology
"This Is America" (2018)	"Summertime Magic" (2018)	"Monster" (2019)

"Summertime Magic" is a song by the American recording artist Childish Gambino. Written and produced by Gambino and Ludwig Göransson, the song was released by Wolf+Rothstein and RCA Records on July 11, 2018. The song was speculated to be the lead single from Gambino's then-upcoming fourth studio album, but was eventually not included. It was made available for digital download and streaming with "Feels Like Summer" as an extended play under the title Summer Pack.

== Personnel ==
Credits adapted from Tidal.

- Childish Gambino – production, mix engineering
- Ludwig Göransson – production
- Riley Temple – mix engineering, master engineering, record engineering
- Kesha "K.Lee" Lee – record engineering

== Charts ==
=== Weekly charts ===
Chart (2018)	Peak position
Australia (ARIA)	31
Belgium (Ultratip Bubbling Under Flanders)	7
Belgium (Ultratip Bubbling Under Wallonia)	16
Canada Hot 100 (Billboard)	33
Czech Republic Singles Digital (ČNS IFPI)	35
Hungary (Stream Top 40)	28
Ireland (IRMA)	21
Netherlands (Single Top 100)	82
New Zealand (Recorded Music NZ)	29
Portugal (AFP)	26
Sweden (Sverigetopplistan)	40
Switzerland (Schweizer Hitparade)	81
UK Singles (Official Charts)	30
US Billboard Hot 100	44
US Hot R&B/Hip-Hop Songs (Billboard)	21
US Rhythmic Airplay (Billboard)	13

=== Year-end charts ===
Chart (2018)	Position
US Hot R&B Songs (Billboard)	33

== Certifications ==
Region	Certification	Certified units/sales
Australia (ARIA)	Platinum	70,000^{‡}
Canada (Music Canada)	Gold	40,000^{‡}
New Zealand (RMNZ)	Platinum	30,000^{‡}
United Kingdom (BPI)	Silver	200,000^{‡}
United States (RIAA)	Platinum	1,000,000^{‡}
^{‡} Sales+streaming figures based on certification alone.

== Release history ==
Region	Date	Format	Label	Ref.
Various	July 11, 2018	Digital download; streaming	Wolf+Rothstein; Liberator Music; RCA	
United States	July 17, 2018	Rhythmic contemporary radio	RCA	
United States	July 17, 2018	Urban contemporary radio	RCA	
United States	July 31, 2018	Contemporary hit radio	RCA	
