= Kadhja Bonet =

American singer-songwriter

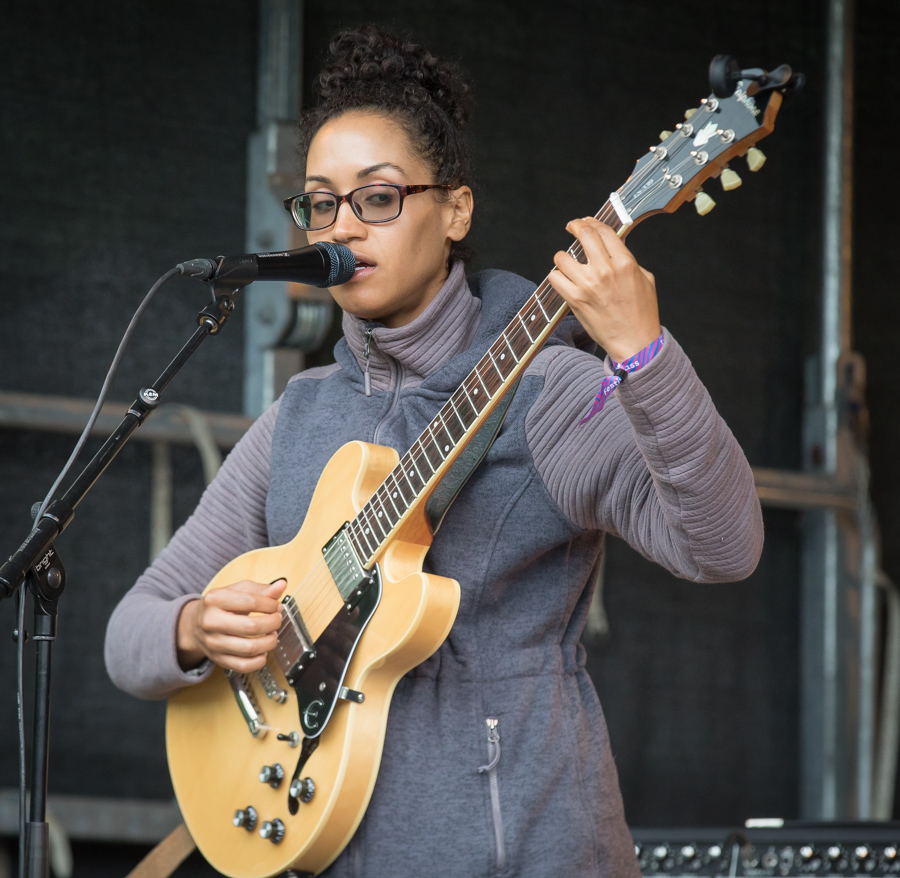
- Bonet performing in 2017
- Born: January 31, 1988 (age 38); California, U.S.
- Occupations: Singer; songwriter
- Years active: 2014–present
- Notable work: Childqueen
- Relatives: Lisa Bonet (half-sister)
- Musical career
- Genre: Psychedelic soul
- Instruments: Vocals; piano; guitar
- Labels: Fat Possum Records; Ninja Tune
- Website: kadhjabonet.com

Kadhja Bonet (/ˈkɑːdjə boʊˈneɪ/ KAHD-yə boh-NAY; born January 31, 1988) is an American singer and songwriter. In 2014, she released her debut single, "Tears for Lamont". Later that year, she self-released her debut EP, The Visitor EP (2015), and in 2016 she re-released it as an album under Fat Possum Records and Fresh Selects, which received critical appraisal. Her second album, Childqueen (2018), charted in US Billboard's Independent Albums and Heatseekers Albums. The same year, she released her second EP, Childqueen Outtakes (2018). Her third EP, California Holiday (2022), was released. She also collaborated with many musicians.

== Early life ==
Bonet grew up in Los Angeles, California, to Allen Bonet, an opera singer of African-American heritage from Texas, and Deborah Church, a musician. She is the middle child of seven siblings and studied classical music from an early age, playing the violin. She taught herself guitar and other instruments. Her half-sister is actress Lisa Bonet through her father.

== Career ==
Bonet's debut, the single "Tears for Lamont", was produced by Itai Shapira and released in 2014. Later that year, while participating in the Red Bull Music Academy program in Tokyo, she collaborated on and released "Late Night Munchies."

The mini album The Visitor EP was first self-released in September 2015, then re-released with new bonus tracks under the name The Visitor in October 2016, as a partnership between two independent record labels, Fat Possum Records and Fresh Selects, receiving critical praise and extensive radio air play.

Her second album, Childqueen, written while touring abroad, was released on June 8, 2018.

She has also appeared on albums from other musicians, including Anderson .Paak, SiR, Bonobo, Khruangbin, Free Nationals, and more.

== Critical reception ==
Bonet's music has been described as psychedelic soul while, for other critics, it "amalgamates folk, jazz and soul," or evokes "Billie Holiday, whisky, and 1940s Disney" in a "genre-defying" way.

Clash magazine wrote that her second album "places Kadhja Bonet in a league of her own." The single "Delphine" from the album was described as "spellbinding" and the album itself as "proof of her idiosyncratic genius."

== Discography ==
Studio albums

- The Visitor (2016)
- Childqueen (2018)

Extended plays

- Childqueen Outtakes (2018)
- California Holiday (2022)

Singles

- "Remember the Rain" (2015)
- "Delphine" (2018)
- "Mother Maybe" (2018)
- "Delphine" (2018)
- "Another Time Lover" (2018)
- "For You" (2021)
- "One of a Kind Love Affair" (2023)

Collaborations

- "On Sight", with Free Nationals, JID and MIKNNA (from the album Free Nationals (2019)).
- "New Sky", SiR (from the album Chasing Summer (2019)).
- "Plans We Make", Son Lux (from the album Tomorrows III (2021)).
- "We Forgot Love", Nicolas Godin (from the album Concrete and Glass (2021)).
- "NOTHING TO ME", Darius (2021).
- "Day by Day", Bonobo (from the album Fragments (2022)).
- "Psilocybae", Childish Gambino (from the album Atavista (2024))
