= The New World Tour (Childish Gambino) =

2024 concert tour by Childish Gambino

- Tour by Childish Gambino
- Promotional poster for the tour
- Associated album: Bando Stone & the New World; Atavista
- Start date: August 11, 2024
- End date: September 7, 2024
- Legs: 1
- No. of shows: 18
- Supporting act: Willow

Childish Gambino concert chronology
- This Is America Tour (2018–19); The New World Tour (2024)

The New World Tour was the fifth concert tour by American rapper Childish Gambino, in support of his 2024 albums Atavista (a re-release of his 2020 album 3.15.20) and Bando Stone & the New World.

On October 4, 2024, after performing 18 shows in North America and postponing the rest of his North American shows, Glover announced that he had cancelled the remainder of his 2024 tour dates due to an undisclosed ailment, which he revealed in 2025 during his Camp Flog Gnaw Carnival set to be a stroke he experienced following the New Orleans concert.

== Background ==
Between 2017 and 2023, Donald Glover has reiterated his intention to retire his Childish Gambino pseudonym during interviews and social media posts, after initially announcing his intention at a 2017 show in the Governors Ball Music Festival. In 2018, he released the single "This Is America", and announced the This Is America Tour, which concluded in 2019 at the Austin City Limits Music Festival.

Glover released his fourth studio album, 3.15.20, during the COVID-19 pandemic, and re-released it in 2024, under the title Atavista. He also released his fifth and final studio album, Bando Stone & the New World, which was a soundtrack album for a film of the same name. Subsequently, Glover announced the dates for the New World Tour, and told fans it will be his final tour as Childish Gambino.

== Opening acts ==
- Willow (North America)
- Amaarae (Europe and Oceania, dates never took place)

== Set list ==
This set list is from the Oklahoma City show on August 11, 2024. It is not intended to represent all dates throughout the tour.

1. "H3@rt$ W3re M3@nt t0 F7¥"
2. "Survive"
3. "I. The Worst Guys"
4. "Talk My Shit"
5. "Got To Be"
6. "In The Night"
7. "Yoshinoya" (Shortened)
8. "To Be Hunted"
9. "Witchy" (Kaytranada Cover)
10. "Steps Beach"
11. "I. Crawl"
12. "Cruisin'"
13. "Feels Like Summer"
14. "Why Go To The Party"
15. "Human Sacrifice"
16. "A Place Where Love Goes"
17. "No Excuses"
18. "Me and Your Mama"
19. "Do Ya Like"
20. "This is America"
21. "IV. Sweatpants"
22. "Sober"
23. "L.E.S."
24. "Heartbeat"
25. "Bonfire"
26. "Freaks and Geeks"
27. "Saturday"* (audience choice song)
28. "V. 3005"
29. "Redbone"
  Encore
30. "Lithonia"

*In each show the twenty seventh song was a song that the audience chose by cheers, in each show Glover presented the audience two songs, between the song there were: III. Urn, Saturday, Final Church, II. Shadows, III. and Telegraph Ave. ("Oakland" by Lloyd)

== Tour dates ==
List of 2024 concerts
Date	City	Country	Venue	Opening act
August 11, 2024	Oklahoma City	United States	Paycom Center	Willow
August 12, 2024	Kansas City	United States	T-Mobile Center	Willow
August 14, 2024	Milwaukee	United States	Fiserv Forum	Willow
August 15, 2024	Columbus	United States	Schottenstein Center	Willow
August 17, 2024	Detroit	United States	Little Caesars Arena	Willow
August 18, 2024	Toronto	Canada	Scotiabank Arena	Willow
August 20, 2024	Pittsburgh	United States	PPG Paints Arena	Willow
August 21, 2024	Philadelphia	United States	Wells Fargo Center	Willow
August 23, 2024	Boston	United States	TD Garden	Willow
August 26, 2024	Brooklyn	United States	Barclays Center	Willow
August 27, 2024	Brooklyn	United States	Barclays Center	Willow
August 29, 2024	Washington, D.C.	United States	Capital One Arena	Willow
August 30, 2024	Raleigh	United States	PNC Arena	Willow
September 1, 2024	Nashville	United States	Bridgestone Arena	Willow
September 2, 2024	Atlanta	United States	State Farm Arena	Willow
September 4, 2024	Tampa	United States	Amalie Arena	Willow
September 5, 2024	Sunrise	United States	Amerant Bank Arena	Willow
September 7, 2024	New Orleans	United States	Smoothie King Center	Willow

== Cancelled shows ==
The following shows were cancelled due to Glover's illness. During his first performance since recovering at Camp Flog Gnaw Carnival in November 2025, Glover stated he had surgeries after having learned he had a stroke due to a hole found in his heart.

Date	City	Country	Venue
September 8, 2024	Houston	United States	Toyota Center
September 10, 2024	Austin	United States	Moody Center
September 11, 2024	Dallas	United States	American Airlines Center
September 13, 2024	Denver	United States	Ball Arena
September 14, 2024	Salt Lake City	United States	Delta Center
September 16, 2024	Phoenix	United States	Footprint Center
September 18, 2024	Los Angeles	United States	Crypto.com Arena
September 19, 2024	Los Angeles	United States	Crypto.com Arena
September 21, 2024	San Francisco	United States	Chase Center
September 23, 2024	Vancouver	Canada	Rogers Arena
September 24, 2024	Portland	United States	Moda Center
September 25, 2024	Seattle	United States	Climate Pledge Arena
September 27, 2024	Calgary	Canada	Scotiabank Saddledome
September 29, 2024	Edmonton	Canada	Rogers Place
October 2, 2024	Saint Paul	United States	Xcel Energy Center
October 3, 2024	Chicago	United States	United Center
October 31, 2024	Lyon	France	LDLC Arena
November 2, 2024	Milan	Italy	Unipol Forum
November 4, 2024	Cologne	Germany	Lanxess Arena
November 6, 2024	Hamburg	Germany	Barclays Arena
November 8, 2024	Oslo	Norway	Oslo Spektrum
November 10, 2024	Copenhagen	Denmark	Royal Arena
November 12, 2024	Prague	Czech Republic	O2 Arena
November 13, 2024	Berlin	Germany	Uber Arena
November 19, 2024	Paris	France	Accor Arena
November 21, 2024	Munich	Germany	Olympiahalle
November 23, 2024	Brussels	Belgium	ING Arena
November 24, 2024	Amsterdam	Netherlands	Ziggo Dome
November 26, 2024	Manchester	England	AO Arena
November 28, 2024	Glasgow	Scotland	OVO Hydro
November 30, 2024	London	England	The O2
December 1, 2024	London	England	The O2
December 3, 2024	Birmingham	England	Utilita Arena
December 5, 2024	Dublin	Ireland	3Arena
January 28, 2025	Auckland	New Zealand	Spark Arena
February 1, 2025	Brisbane	Australia	Entertainment Centre
February 4, 2025	Sydney	Australia	Qudos Bank Arena
February 5, 2025	Sydney	Australia	Qudos Bank Arena
February 7, 2025	Melbourne	Australia	Rod Laver Arena
February 8, 2025	Melbourne	Australia	Rod Laver Arena
February 11, 2025	Perth	Australia	RAC Arena

Other cancellations

August 24, 2024	Uncasville, Connecticut	Mohegan Sun Arena	Cancelled due to technical difficulties.
