= This Is America Tour =

2018–19 concert tour by Childish Gambino

- Tour by Childish Gambino
- Start date: September 6, 2018
- End date: October 12, 2019
- Legs: 3
- No. of shows: 35

Childish Gambino concert chronology
- Deep Web Tour (2014); This Is America Tour (2018–19); The New World Tour (2024)

The This Is America Tour was the fifth concert tour by American recording artist Childish Gambino. The tour began in the summer of 2018, playing over 30 shows in North America and Europe.

== Background ==
Donald Glover, the individual behind the Childish Gambino pseudonym announced his intention to retire the name in June 2017, telling the audience "I'll see you for the last Gambino album" before walking off stage at the Governors Ball Music Festival. He further explained his decision in an interview, feeling his musical career was no longer "necessary" and added "There's nothing worse than like a third sequel" and "I like it when something's good and when it comes back there's a reason to come back, there's a reason to do that." Glover signed with RCA Records in January 2018, which Glover called "a necessary change of pace". In May 2018, he released a single titled "This Is America" while performing dual hosting and musical duty on Saturday Night Live. The song debuted at number one, becoming both Glover's first number one and top ten single in the United States. It features him both singing and rapping, drawing influence from trap music. Its lyrics addressed a variety of topics including gun violence in the United States and being black in the United States, while its provocative video, directed by frequent collaborator Hiro Murai, featured Glover performing a series of shootings before breaking into dance.

On July 11, 2018, Glover released the EP Summer Pack which contained the songs "Summertime Magic" and "Feels Like Summer", the former of which is the lead single from Glover's forthcoming fourth studio album. The music video for "Feels Like Summer" was released on September 1, 2018, and features animated cameos from numerous prominent rappers and R&B vocalists. The video is meant to symbolize Glover's departure from the rap community and depicts his animated rendition as he walks down a neighborhood street, passing by several big names like Will Smith, Nicki Minaj, Travis Scott, Kanye West, Beyoncé, Lil Wayne, and Michael Jackson.

In September 2018, Glover made two previously unreleased songs, "Algorhythm" and "All Night", exclusively available to fans who bought tickets to his tour. "Algorhythm" was performed at every show on the tour, and was eventually released on his next studio album, 3.15.20. "All Night" was exclusively performed at the debut show in Atlanta, and only subsequently performed at Gambino's next PHAROS events.

During the first show of the tour in Atlanta, Glover confirmed that this is the last Gambino tour ever, telling the audience: "I love you forever for supporting me and coming out for this shit. Second, if you're in here, that means you bought a ticket, so you don't need to film this shit. Experience this shit. This is not a concert. This is fucking church. If you're not here to celebrate life, if you're not here to enjoy your time here, if you're just here to hear your favorite song, you should go home right now and do that. I'm here to have an experience with y'all tonight, ya feel me?"

On September 23, 2018, Glover reportedly injured his foot during his show in Dallas, leaving the stage early and not performing an encore set.

Despite Glover's intention for the This is America tour to be his final, he released both Atavista (a re-release of his 2020 album 3.15.20) and Bando Stone & the New World in 2024, which was followed by an announcement for his new and final tour titled The New World Tour. Glover initially performed 18 shows, between August and September 2024, but had to cancel the remaining shows due to health complications.

== Critical reception ==
Althea Legaspi of the Chicago Tribune wrote that Glover "offer[ed] a sacred space where love, loss, inequality and community were explored through song", and wrote that "this may be Glover's last hurrah as Childish Gambino, but the performance made a compelling case for seeking out his next incarnation."

Karlton Jahmal of HotNewHipHop wrote that "Childish Gambino had the best concert I’ve witnesses since Yeezus, and hopefully, his retirement from touring is just a momentary lapse in judgment. A performance on this level will surely be missed."

Alex Stedman of Variety wrote that "Gambino put on a show at Los Angeles’ the Forum that was at once spiritual and electric, a celebration of an eclectic discography and, hopefully, an exciting peek at what's to come."

Charles Holmes of the Rolling Stone wrote that "The 'This Is America' Tour served as a symbolic funeral. It's a successful send-off for the Gambino moniker, and the hard-won development it represents, but not for Glover's music career. Donald Glover is still searching for himself as a musician, and made sure to provide a glimpse at what's yet to come."

== Opening acts ==
- Rae Sremmurd (North America, September and December 2018)
- Vince Staples (North America, December 2018)
- H.E.R. (Europe)
- Channel Tres (Australia)

== Set list ==
The following set list was obtained from the concert held on September 6, 2018, at the Infinite Energy Arena in Duluth, Georgia. It does not represent every concert for the duration of the tour.

1. "Atavista"
2. "Algorhythm"
3. "All Night"
4. "Summertime Magic"
5. "The Worst Guys"
6. "Worldstar"
7. "Stand Tall"
8. "Boogieman" (with "Me and Your Mama" intro)
9. "Riot"
10. "Have Some Love"
11. "Terrified"
12. "Feels Like Summer"
13. "Human Sacrifice" (with "Why Go to the Party" intro)
14. "This Is America"
  Encore
15. "Sober"
16. "3005"
17. "Sweatpants"
18. "Redbone"

== Shows ==
Date	City	Country	Venue	Opening act
North America
September 6, 2018	Duluth	United States	Infinite Energy Arena	Rae Sremmurd
September 8, 2018	Chicago	United States	United Center	Rae Sremmurd
September 10, 2018	Toronto	Canada	Scotiabank Arena	Rae Sremmurd
September 12, 2018	Boston	United States	TD Garden	Rae Sremmurd
September 14, 2018	New York City	United States	Madison Square Garden	Rae Sremmurd
September 15, 2018	New York City	United States	Madison Square Garden	Rae Sremmurd
September 18, 2018	Philadelphia	United States	Wells Fargo Center	Rae Sremmurd
September 19, 2018	Washington, D.C.	United States	Capital One Arena	Rae Sremmurd
September 22, 2018	Houston	United States	Toyota Center	Rae Sremmurd
September 23, 2018	Dallas	United States	American Airlines Center	Rae Sremmurd
December 2, 2018	Nashville	United States	Bridgestone Arena	Vince Staples
December 4, 2018	Denver	United States	Pepsi Center	Vince Staples
December 7, 2018	Vancouver	Canada	Rogers Arena	Rae Sremmurd
December 11, 2018	Oakland	United States	Oracle Arena	Rae Sremmurd
December 12, 2018	San Jose	United States	SAP Center	Vince Staples
December 15, 2018	Glendale	United States	Gila River Arena	Vince Staples
December 16, 2018	Inglewood	United States	The Forum	Rae Sremmurd
December 17, 2018	Inglewood	United States	The Forum	Vince Staples
Europe
March 24, 2019	London	England	The O_{2} Arena	H.E.R.
March 25, 2019	London	England	The O_{2} Arena	H.E.R.
March 27, 2019	Paris	France	AccorHotels Arena	H.E.R.
North American Festivals
April 12, 2019	Indio	United States	Coachella Valley Music & Arts Festival	N/A
April 19, 2019	Indio	United States	Coachella Valley Music & Arts Festival	N/A
April 27, 2019	Landover	United States	Broccoli City Festival	N/A
June 14, 2019	Manchester	United States	Bonnaroo Music & Arts Festival	N/A
Oceania
July 14, 2019	Perth	Australia	HBF Stadium	N/A
July 17, 2019	Melbourne	Australia	Rod Laver Arena	N/A
July 19, 2019	Adelaide	Australia	Spin Off Festival	N/A
July 20, 2019	Byron Bay	Australia	Splendour in the Grass 2019	N/A
July 24, 2019	Sydney	Australia	Qudos Bank Arena	N/A
North American Festivals
August 2, 2019	Chicago	United States	Lollapalooza	N/A
August 4, 2019	Montreal	Canada	Osheaga Festival	N/A
August 9, 2019	San Francisco	United States	Outside Lands Music and Arts Festival	N/A
October 5, 2019	Austin	United States	Austin City Limits	N/A
October 12, 2019	Austin	United States	Austin City Limits	N/A

Cancellations and rescheduled shows

September 26, 2018	Inglewood, California	The Forum	Rescheduled to December 16, 2018
September 27, 2018	Oakland, California	Oracle Arena	Rescheduled to December 11, 2018
September 29, 2018	Seattle, Washington	KeyArena	Cancelled
September 30, 2018	Vancouver, Canada	Rogers Arena	Rescheduled to December 7, 2018
October 2, 2018	San Jose, California	SAP Center	Rescheduled to December 12, 2018
October 3, 2018	Inglewood, California	The Forum	Rescheduled to December 17, 2018
October 5, 2018	Glendale, Arizona	Gila River Arena	Rescheduled to December 15, 2018
October 7, 2018	Austin, Texas	Zilker Park	Cancelled. This concert was a part of the "Austin City Limits Music Festival"
October 9, 2018	Denver, Colorado	Pepsi Center	Rescheduled to December 4, 2018
October 12, 2018	Nashville, Tennessee	Bridgestone Arena	Rescheduled to December 2, 2018
October 14, 2018	Austin, Texas	Zilker Park	Cancelled. This concert was a part of the "Austin City Limits Music Festival"
October 30, 2018	Paris, France	Zénith Paris	Rescheduled to March 27, 2019 and moved to the AccorHotels Arena
November 4, 2018	London, England	The O_{2} Arena	Rescheduled to March 24, 2019
November 8, 2018	Perth, Australia	HBF Stadium	Cancelled
November 10, 2018	Melbourne, Australia	Sidney Myer Music Bowl	Cancelled
November 14, 2018	Sydney, Australia	Sydney Opera House Forecourt	Cancelled
November 15, 2018	Sydney, Australia	Sydney Opera House Forecourt	Cancelled
November 17, 2018	Canberra, Australia	Commonwealth Park	Cancelled. This concert was a part of "Spilt Milk"

=== Box office score data ===
Venue	City	Tickets sold / Available	Gross revenue
Madison Square Garden	New York City	27,678 / 27,678 (100%)	$2,557,840
The Forum	Inglewood	26,673 / 26,673 (100%)	$2,447,306
The O_{2} Arena	London	31,657 / 35,041 (90%)	$2,070,440
Oracle Arena	Oakland	12,296 / 13,306 (92%)	$1,262,651
Scotiabank Arena	Toronto	14,305 / 14,305 (100%)	$1,254,870
Capital One Arena	Washington, D.C.	12,556 / 13,193 (95%)	$1,192,435
Rogers Arena	Vancouver	12,263 / 13,161 (93%)	$1,054,929
Toyota Center	Houston	9,965 / 11,544 (86%)	$1,048,518
American Airlines Center	Dallas	10,986 / 11,747 (94%)	$1,037,757
Pepsi Center	Denver	10,949 / 12,112 (90%)	$932,758
Gila River Arena	Glendale	11,328 / 12,273 (92%)	$829,772
AccorHotels Arena	Paris	10,051 / 14,471 (69%)	$596,884
Total		190,707 / 205,504 (93%)	$16,286,160
