= Bando Stone & the New World =

2024 studio and soundtrack album by Childish Gambino

Studio album by Childish Gambino
- Released: July 19, 2024
- Genres: Alternative R&B; pop; hip-hop
- Length: 60:11
- Label: RCA
- Producers: Dahi; Donald Glover; Ludwig Göransson; Oscar Holter; Khruangbin; Steve Lacy; Max Martin; Kurtis McKenzie; Michael Uzowuru; Dylan Wiggins

Childish Gambino chronology
Atavista (2024)	Bando Stone & the New World (2024)

Singles from Bando Stone & the New World
- 1. "Lithonia" Released: July 2, 2024; 2. "In the Night" Released: July 16, 2024

Bando Stone & the New World is the fifth studio album by American actor and musician Donald Glover, and his final album under the stage name Childish Gambino. It was released on July 19, 2024, through RCA Records.

The album was met with positive reviews from critics, who praised its eclectic production, mature songwriting and Glover's vocal performance, but were mixed on its lack of cohesiveness. At the 67th Annual Grammy Awards, Bando Stone & the New World was nominated for Best Progressive R&B Album.

== Background ==
In 2017, Donald Glover revealed he planned to retire the stage name Childish Gambino after his next project, telling the Governors Ball Music Festival attendees, "I'll see you for the last Gambino album". In 2018, Glover won the Grammy Award for Best Traditional R&B Performance for his 2016 single "Redbone". At the Q&A following the ceremony, Glover reiterated his intention to retire the Gambino moniker and release a final project, saying "I think endings are good because they force things to get better". Glover told attendees of the This is America Tour that the tour would be Childish Gambino's final tour. In 2020, Glover unceremoniously released the studio album 3.15.20 in an unfinished state amid the COVID-19 pandemic and the loss of his father. It was unknown at the time if the release would be Glover's final Childish Gambino project.

In 2023, Glover confirmed that Childish Gambino had not been retired yet, revealing that he was in the process of making new music. During a livestream in May 2024 from Glover's production company Gilga, Glover announced that he would be releasing two albums in the same year. The first would be a finished version of 3.15.20, now titled Atavista; the second would be an all-new album titled Bando Stone & the New World, the soundtrack to a tentpole film from Gilga of the same name. Glover confirmed the latter release would act as the final album under the moniker of Childish Gambino.

Atavista officially released on May 13, 2024, with Glover confirming the release for the all-new Childish Gambino in the summer of the same year. A world tour, called "The New World Tour", was announced by Glover the same week.

== Concept and writing ==
The project features Glover taking on the role of Bando Stone, a singer stumbling into a post-apocalyptic world before teaming up with a woman and her son to fight prehistoric creatures and try to escape from an unexplained phenomenon that seems to delete "chunks" of the world. Glover began work on both the album and the film after completing the final season of his television series Atlanta in 2022. The concept of the film stemmed from Glover trying to find a purpose for his work, with the film revolving around a musician trying to survive a global calamity.

Glover called the album a "big goodbye album" and stated he wanted to force the audience to participate and to use their imagination. He said he focused on making anthemic songs, allowing for a sense of togetherness when played in large rooms. He also focused on not shying away from wholesomeness and joy on the record, saying "No one on their deathbed is going to look back and say, 'Thank God I avoided being cringe.'"

== Composition ==
Bando Stone & the New World encompasses many genres. AllMusic's Tim Sendra likens it as an amalgamation of almost all of the musical phases of Glover's career. Primarily an alternative R&B, pop and hip-hop record, Bando Stone & the New World dips into trap, contemporary R&B, indie pop, hyperpop, and rock stylings. Notes of Afrobeats, electronic and jazz are also present on the album. David Fleming served as the project's composer.

== Promotion and release ==
The film, touted as an IMAX exclusive event, had its first trailer premiere in IMAX with showings of A Quiet Place: Day One, releasing on YouTube on July 1, 2024.

The album's lead single, "Lithonia", was released on July 2, 2024, with the album being dated for release on July 19. It is a guitar-driven rock song named after the city of Lithonia in Georgia. Abby Jones of Stereogum described the song as "dramatic" and "rock-heavy". On July 22, Glover released the official music video for "Lithonia", featuring appearances from Alex Wolff, Ludwig Göransson, and Suzanna Son.

The same week Glover held a listening party event in Little Island, New York where he played and performed songs from the album ahead of release. Glover confirmed features with Chloe Bailey, Steve Lacy, Flo Milli, Fousheé, Jorja Smith, Yeat, Amaarae and Glover's son.

The album's second single, "In the Night" featuring Jorja Smith and Amaarae, was released on July 16, 2024.

== Critical reception ==
Bando Stone & the New World ratings
Aggregate scores
Source	Rating
AnyDecentMusic?	6.9/10
Metacritic	72/100
Review scores
Source	Rating
AllMusic	4/5 stars
Clash	9/10
Exclaim!	6/10
The Independent	4/5 stars
NME	4/5 stars
Pitchfork	5.8/10
Rolling Stone	3/5 stars

Bando Stone & the New World was met with positive reviews from music critics. On Metacritic, which assigns a normalized score out of 100 to ratings from professional publications, the album received a weighted mean score of 72, based on eleven reviews, indicating "generally favorable reviews". The review aggregator site AnyDecentMusic? compiled seven reviews and gave the album an average of 6.9 out of 10.

Variety's Jem Aswad declared the album as not only Glover's "best and most far-reaching musical project to date," but easily one of the top albums of 2024. Robin Murray of Clash called Bando Stone & the New World an "exceptional" work of "maturity and vision, out-pacing [Glover's] peers to deliver something vital, and true to himself." The Independent's Louis Chilton believes the "overgrown opus" does little to dispel Glover's reputation as a "self-serious artiste", but its maximalist aesthetic and sublime production lives up to the hype.

Much of the criticism Bando Stone & the New World received was aimed at its continuity. NME's Kyann-Sian Williams felt the album's lack of a "clear sense" of cohesion or theme made it a "bittersweet" farewell to Childish Gambino. Alphonse Pierre of Pitchfork agreed, writing the "strained" and "familiar" record takes algorithmic swings rather than experimental. Christopher R. Weingarten, in his review for Rolling Stone, argued that some of Glover's ideas would have been better served if he had hired Weezer or Pusha T to deliver them.

=== Accolades ===
List of awards and nominations received by Bando Stone & the New World
Year	Award	Category	Result	Ref.
2025	Grammy Awards	Best Progressive R&B Album	Nominated	

== Track listing ==
Bando Stone & the New World track listing
No.	Title	Writer(s)	Producer(s)	Length
1.	"Hearts Were Meant to Fly"	Donald Glover; Ama Genfi	D. Glover; Ludwig Göransson^{[a]}; Brittney Orinda^{[a]}; Kurtis McKenzie^{[a]}	3:07
2.	"Lithonia"	D. Glover; Göransson; Riley Mackin; Max Martin; Michael Uzowuru	D. Glover; Göransson; Martin; Uzowuru	2:58
3.	"Survive" (featuring Chlöe)	Chloe Bailey; D. Glover; Göransson; Stephen Glover; Dacoury Natche; Uzowuru	D. Glover; Dahi; Göransson^{[c]}; Uzowuru^{[c]}	4:07
4.	"Steps Beach"	D. Glover; Britanny Foushée; Steve Lacy	D. Glover; Lacy	3:48
5.	"Talk My Shit" (featuring Amaarae and Flo Milli)	D. Glover; Tamia Carter; Genfi	D. Glover	3:45
6.	"Got to Be"	D. Glover; Luther Campbell; Harry Wayne Casey; Richard Finch; Keith Flint; Liam Howlett; Tyler Johnson; Keith Palmer; Uzowuru	D. Glover; Johnson^{[c]}; Uzowuru^{[c]}	2:56
7.	"Real Love"	D. Glover; Jordan Brown; Juan Contreras; Dylan Wiggins; Uzowuru	Wiggins; Uzowuru	2:17
8.	"In the Night" (featuring Jorja Smith and Amaarae)	D. Glover; Jayla Darden; Genfi; Chukwudi Hodge; McKenzie; Natche; Ely Rise; Tierra Whack	D. Glover; McKenzie; Dahi	3:49
9.	"Yoshinoya"	D. Glover; Scott M. Carter; Vanessa D. Wood	D. Glover; Triangle Park	3:22
10.	"Can You Feel Me" (featuring Legend)	D. Glover; Joseph Raposo; Uzowuru	D. Glover; Uzowuru	2:58
11.	"No Excuses" (featuring Ludwig Göransson and Kamasi Washington)	D. Glover; Göransson; Orinda; Uzowuru	D. Glover; Göransson; Uzowuru	7:23
12.	"Cruisin'" (featuring Yeat)	D. Glover; Göransson; Natche; Noah Smith; Uzowuru	D. Glover; Göransson; Dahi; Caroline Whitaker; Uzowuru^{[a]}; Johnson^{[a]}	3:58
13.	"We Are God"	D. Glover; Natche	D. Glover; Dahi	4:23
14.	"Running Around" (featuring Fousheé)	D. Glover; Foushée; Johnson; Mackin; Uzowuru	D. Glover; Uzowuru; Johnson^{[a]}; Mackin^{[a]}	2:34
15.	"Dadvocate"	D. Glover; Wiggins; Uzowuru	D. Glover; Uzowuru; Wiggins	2:40
16.	"Happy Survival" (featuring Khruangbin)	Khruangbin; Eddie Okwedy	Khruangbin	3:23
17.	"A Place Where Love Goes"	D. Glover; Göransson; Oscar Holter; Martin; Natche	D. Glover; Göransson; Martin; Dahi; Holter; Mackin^{[v]}	2:43
Total length:				60:11

Notes

- ^{^[c]} signifies a co-producer
- ^{^[a]} signifies an additional producer
- ^{^[v]} signifies a vocal producer
- "Hearts Were Meant to Fly" is stylized as "H3@RT$ W3RE M3@NT T0 F7¥"

Sample credits

- "Hearts Were Meant to Fly" contains a sound effect from the video game Undertale.
- "Talk My Shit" contains a sound effect from the anime Fist of the North Star, Dragon Ball Z and as well as one from the video game Super Smash Bros. Brawl.
- "Got to Be" contains samples of "Breathe" performed by The Prodigy, written by Liam Howlett, Keith Flint and Maxim Reality; and "I Wanna Rock" as performed by Luke, written by Luther Campbell, Harry Wayne Casey and Richard Finch.
- "Can You Feel Me" contains samples of "African Alphabet with Kermit" from the children's television show Sesame Street.
- "We Are God" contains samples of "0.00" performed by Glover, written by Glover, James Francies Jr. and Denise Renee.
- "Happy Survival" contains an interpolation of "Happy Survival", written and performed by Ifeanyi Eddie Okwedy & His Maymores Dance Band.

== Personnel ==
Musicians

- Donald Glover – lead vocals (all tracks), drums (tracks 1–4, 9, 11), synth bass (1), keyboards (3); percussion, synthesizer (10); strings (12)
- Ludwig Göransson – guitar, keyboards (track 1); electric guitar (6), tambourine (7), synthesizer (10); drums, synth bass (12)
- Jessica Allain Legend – vocals (track 1)
- Riley Mackin – programming (track 2), vocal effects (11), guitar (14)
- Ely Rise – keyboards (tracks 3, 4, 6, 8, 12)
- Kamasi Washington – saxophone (tracks 3, 11)
- Chloe Bailey – vocals (track 3)
- Brittany Fousheé – background vocals (track 4)
- Chelsea West – choir (tracks 5, 6, 9, 17)
- Denise Stoudmire – choir (tracks 5, 6, 9, 17)
- Taylor Milton – choir (5, 6, 9, 17)
- Claudia Cunningham – choir (tracks 5, 6, 9, 17)
- Bri Jolie – choir (tracks 5, 6, 9)
- Elizabeth Sis Komba – choir (tracks 5, 6, 9)
- Taneka Samone – choir (tracks 5, 6, 9)
- Tickwanya Jones – choir (tracks 5, 6, 9)
- Vanessa Wood – choir (tracks 5, 6, 9)
- Malik Flint – percussion (tracks 6, 11); keyboards, synth bass (11)
- Michael Uzowuru – drums (tracks 6, 15), guitar (6)
- Dylan Wiggins – drums, guitar (track 6); acoustic guitar, bass (15)
- Steve Lacy – background vocals (track 7)
- Elijah Fox – organ (track 7)
- Omer Fedi – organ (track 7)
- Kurtis McKenzie – synth bass (track 8), drums (9)
- Jayla Darden – background vocals (track 8)
- Chukwudi Hodge – drums (track 8)
- Syd – background vocals (track 11)
- Dani Markham – background vocals, drums, percussion (track 11)
- Lynette – keyboards, organ, percussion (track 11)
- Thomas Drayton – bass, percussion (track 11)
- Dahi – drum machine, synth bass (track 12); drums (13, 17)
- Willow Smith – background vocals (track 14)
- Aaron Steele – drums (track 14)
- Tyler Johnson – guitar (track 14)
- Emi Trevena – guitar (track 14)
- Legend – vocals (track 16)
- Amaarae – lead vocals (track 5, 8), background vocals (track 17)
- Savannah – background vocals (track 17)
- Oweleo Titi – choir (track 17)
- Jamal M. Moore – choir (track 17)
- Lemmo Moser – choir (track 17)
- Isaiah Johnson – choir (track 17)
- Emi Secrest – choir (track 17)
- Orlando Dixon – choir (track 17)
- Revel Day – choir (track 17)
- Chelsea Miller – choir (track 17)
- Aja Marie – choir (track 17)
- Sharon Bennett – choir (track 17)
- Steve Epting – choir (track 17)
- Taneka Simone – choir (track 17)
- Susan Caro – choir (track 17)
- Roman Collins – choir (track 17)

Technical

- Colin Leonard – mastering
- Mike Bozzi – mastering (track 2)
- Stuart White – mixing
- Brittney Orinda – engineering (tracks 1–5, 7–12, 14, 17)
- Riley Mackin – engineering (tracks 1–4, 6–9, 11–15, 17)
- Khruangbin – engineering (track 16)
- Matheus Braz – engineering assistance
- Patrick Gardner – engineering assistance (tracks 1–8, 10–15)
- Conner McFarland – engineering assistance (tracks 1–3, 6–8, 11–15)
- John Sher – engineering assistance (tracks 1, 5, 12)
- Jonathan Lopez Garcia – engineering assistance (tracks 2, 6, 8, 10, 17)
- Terena Dawn – engineering assistance (tracks 2, 17)
- John Armstrong – engineering assistance (tracks 6, 11, 12)
- Ciaran De Chaud – engineering assistance (track 6)
- Terena Dawn – engineering assistance (tracks 7, 10)
- Caroline Whitaker – engineering assistance (track 7)
- Eric Eylands – engineering assistance (tracks 11, 12)
- Nathalie Martinez – engineering assistance (track 17)
- Vilma Colling – engineering assistance (track 17)
- Linn Fijal – engineering assistance (track 17)
- Max Martin – arrangement (track 2)
- Michael Uzowuru – arrangement (track 2)

== Charts ==
=== Weekly charts ===
Weekly chart performance for Bando Stone & the New World
Chart (2024)	Peak position
Australian Albums (ARIA)	30
Austrian Albums (Ö3 Austria)	51
Belgian Albums (Ultratop Flanders)	41
Belgian Albums (Ultratop Wallonia)	145
Canadian Albums (Billboard)	17
Danish Albums (Hitlisten)	39
Dutch Albums (Album Top 100)	30
French Albums (SNEP)	85
Icelandic Albums (Tónlistinn)	21
Irish Albums (Official Charts)	29
Lithuanian Albums (AGATA)	37
New Zealand Albums (RMNZ)	18
Norwegian Albums (VG-lista)	17
Portuguese Albums (AFP)	36
UK Albums (Official Charts)	33
UK R&B Albums (Official Charts)	24
US Billboard 200	16
US Top R&B/Hip-Hop Albums (Billboard)	2

=== Year-end charts ===
Year-end chart performance for Bando Stone & the New World
Chart (2024)	Position
US Top R&B/Hip-Hop Albums (Billboard)	94
