= STN MTN / Kauai =

Mixtape / EP by Childish Gambino
- Released: October 2, 2014 (STN MTN); October 3, 2014 (Kauai)
- Recorded: 2014
- Genre: Hip hop (STN MTN); R&B, alternative R&B (Kauai)
- Length: 68:31; 40:28 (STN MTN); 28:03 (Kauai)
- Label: Glassnote
- Producer: Nick Banga; Big Soj; Childish Gambino; DJ Drama; Ludwig Göransson; Tim Suby; Zaytoven

Childish Gambino chronology
Because the Internet (2013)	STN MTN / Kauai (2014)	"Awaken, My Love!" (2016)

Childish Gambino mixtape chronology
Royalty (2012)	STN MTN (2014)

Childish Gambino EP chronology
EP (2011)	Kauai (2014)	Summer Pack (2018)

Singles from STN MTN / Kauai
- 1. "Sober" Released: September 14, 2014

STN MTN / Kauai is the combined release of the seventh mixtape and second extended play (EP) by American recording artist Childish Gambino. The STN MTN mixtape was released on October 2, 2014 as a free download from DatPiff, while the Kauai EP was made available the following day through online music stores by Glassnote Records. They are each considered dual sides of a concept album that are unified by a cohesive story line, and come ten months after Glover's second studio album, Because the Internet.

== Background ==
Producers who contributed to the mixtape include Donald Glover himself, as well as Nick Banga, Big Soj, Ludwig Göransson, Chris Hartz, Tim Suby, and Zaytoven.

On October 5, 2014, fans on Reddit discovered a hidden a cappella verse on one of Donald Glover's websites. It was confirmed by Gambino that the verse syncs up with the instrumental portion of "V. 3005 (Beach Picnic Version)".

While STN MTN is free, the proceeds from the sales of Kauai are dedicated to maintaining and preserving Kauai island, which the second half of the EP is named after. The letters STN MTN are a disemvowelment of Glover's hometown, Stone Mountain, Georgia.

== Composition ==
STN MTN is a concept mixtape where Glover is asleep dreaming he "ran Atlanta", with songs based on modern day southern hip hop. The mixtape ends with Glover awaking from this dream on the Hawaiian island, Kauai. Kauai is a concept EP. Unlike STN MTN, Kauai focuses on themes such as love, nostalgia and passion, using alternative R&B. A song from the EP Kauai, "Retro [Rough]", is based on Gambino's earlier song, "Love Is Crazy" featuring Eugene Cordero, from his mixtape Sick Boi.

== Critical reception ==
Professional ratings
Review scores
Source	Rating
AllMusic	3.5/5 stars
Consequence of Sound	B−
Drowned in Sound	7/10
HipHopDX	3.5/5 / 3.5/5
Wondering Sound	2.5/5 stars
XXL	4/5

STN MTN / Kauai has received generally positive reviews. DJ Booth gave the project a 4.7/5 stars, calling it "a cohesive project... it's Gambino so there will be at least some depth to make a follow up review worth while." Zach Dionne of Complex gave a positive review saying that "In a couple songs, he flies us there, thousands of miles away from Atlanta, to see for ourselves."

== Commercial performance ==
Kauai debuted at number 18 on the Billboard 200, selling 16,000 copies in its first week. In its second week, the EP rose to number 16 on the chart, selling 19,000 copies, bringing its two-week total to 35,000 copies. In its third week, the EP dropped down to number 46 on the chart, selling 7,000 copies, bringing the total album sales to 42,000 copies in the United States.

== Track listing ==
STN MTN
No.	Title	Producer(s)	Length
1.	"Dream" / "Southern Hospitality" / "Partna Dem"	The Neptunes; K.C. da Beatmonster	5:00
2.	"Fucks Given"	Nick Banga	2:30
3.	"No Small Talk" (featuring Kari Faux)	Black Party; Kari Faux	3:15
4.	"Money Baby"	Big Fruit	3:25
5.	"Move That Dope" / "Nextel Chirp" / "Let Your Hair Blow" (featuring Young Scooter)	Mike Will Made It; Lil Jon; Zaytoven	4:51
6.	"AssShots Remix" (featuring Royalty)	Big Soj	5:01
7.	"Childish Gambino @ The Atrium"	Childish Gambino	1:26
8.	"U Don't Have to Call"	The Neptunes; Ludwig Göransson	3:34
9.	"Candler Road"	Tim Suby; Childish Gambino	3:17
10.	"All Y'all"	Timbaland	3:39
11.	"Go DJ"	Mannie Fresh	4:30
Total length:			40:28

Kauai
No.	Title	Writer(s)	Producer(s)	Length
1.	"Sober"	Glover, Göransson	Glover, Göransson	4:12
2.	"Pop Thieves (Make It Feel Good)" (featuring Jaden Smith)	Glover, Göransson	Glover, Göransson	5:09
3.	"Retro (Rough)"	Glover, Göransson	Glover, Göransson	3:22
4.	"The Palisades" (featuring Christian Rich)	Glover, Taiwo Hassan, Kehinde Hassan	Christian Rich	3:10
5.	"Poke" (featuring Steve G. Lover)	Chris Hartz	Chris Hartz	3:36
6.	"Late Night in Kauai" (featuring Jaden Smith)	Glover, Göransson	Glover, Göransson	4:45
7.	"V. 3005" (Beach Picnic Version)		Glover, Göransson	3:45
Total length:				28:03

== Charts ==
2014 chart performance for Kauai
Chart (2014)	Peak position
Australian Albums (ARIA)	25
US Billboard 200	16
US Top R&B/Hip-Hop Albums (Billboard)	2

2022 chart performance for Kauai
Chart (2022)	Peak position
Scottish Albums (OCC)	17
UK Albums (OCC)	85
UK Independent Albums (OCC)	6
UK R&B Albums (OCC)	3
US Billboard 200	13

== Release history ==
Release history and formats for STN MTN / Kauai
Country	Date	Version	Format	Label	Ref.
Various	October 2, 2014	STN MTN	Digital download; (DatPiff exclusive)	—	
Various	October 3, 2014	Kauai	Digital download	Glassnote	
Various	April 22, 2022	Kauai	Vinyl	RCA	
