= Northwest Stadium =

Stadium in Landover, Maryland, U.S.

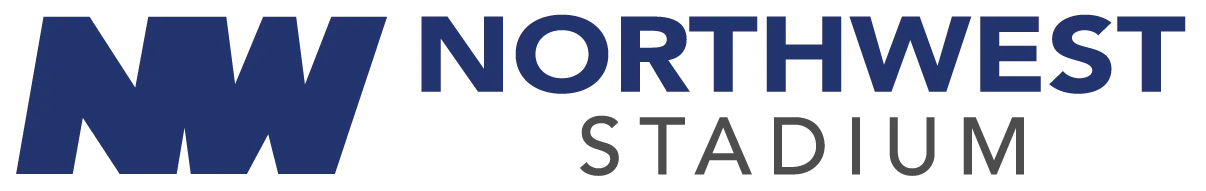

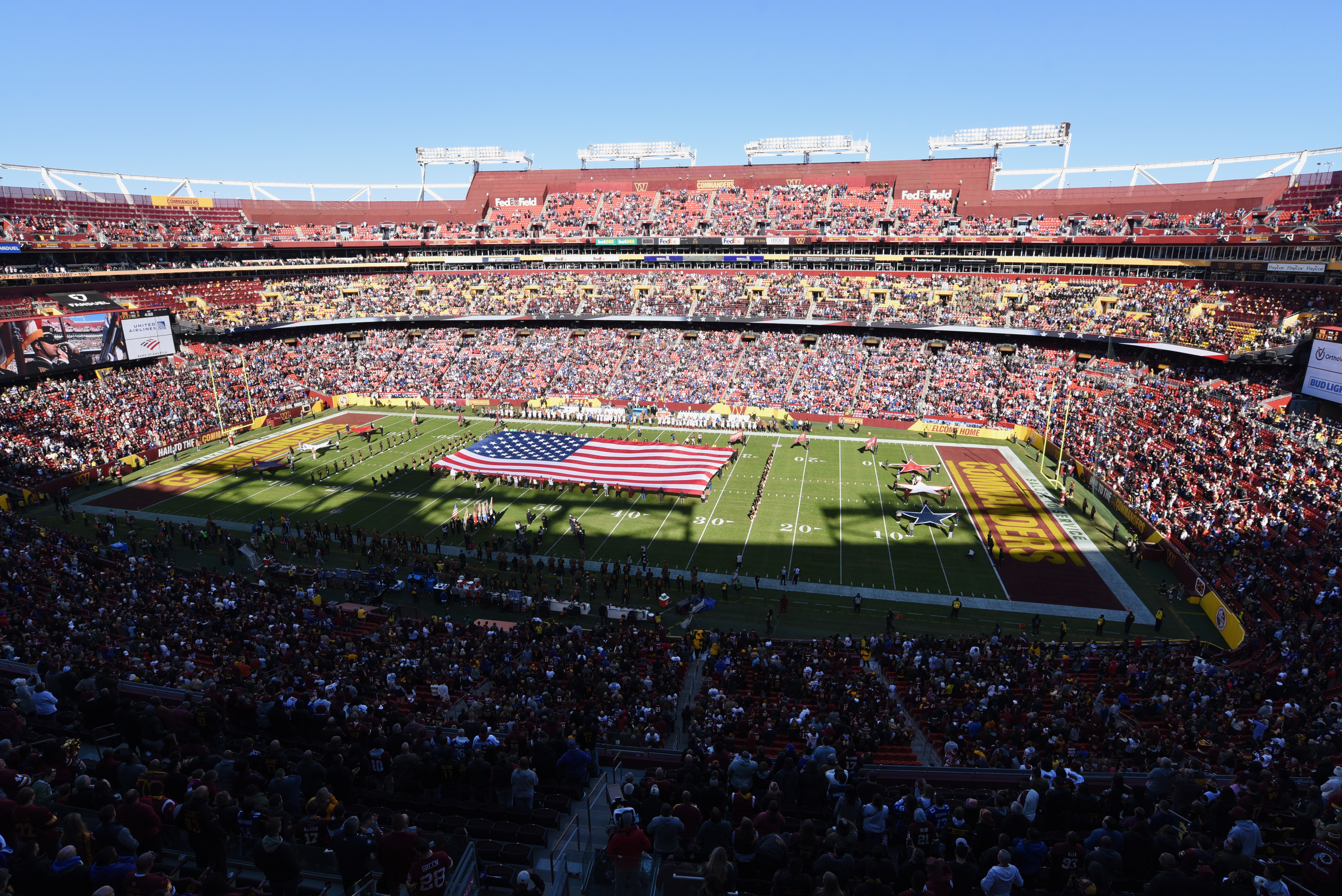
- A Washington Commanders game at the stadium, 2023

- Location within Maryland Location within the United States
- Former names: Jack Kent Cooke Stadium (1997–1999); Redskins Stadium (1999); FedExField (1999–2024); Commanders Field (2024)
- Address: 1600 Ring Road
- Location: Landover, Maryland, U.S.
- Coordinates: 38°54′28″N 76°51′52″W
- Owner: Washington Commanders (Josh Harris)
- Operator: Harris Blitzer Sports & Entertainment
- Capacity: 64,000 Former capacity: List: 62,000 (2022–2024); 58,000 (2021); 67,617 (2015–2021); 79,000 (2012–2015); 83,000 (2011); 91,704 (2009–2010); 91,665 (2004–2008); 86,484 (2001–2003); 85,407 (2000); 80,116 (1997–1999)
- Executive suites: 257
- Type: Multi-purpose stadium
- Events: American football; soccer; concerts
- Surface: Bermuda grass
- Public transit: Metro: at Morgan Boulevard

Construction
- Groundbreaking: March 13, 1996
- Opened: September 14, 1997
- Expanded: 1998, 2000, 2005
- Cost: US$251 million; ($503 million in 2025 dollars)
- Architect: HOK Sport
- Structural engineers: Bliss & Nyitray, Inc
- Services engineers: M-E Engineers, Inc.
- General contractor: Clark Construction
- Main contractor: Driggs Construction Co.

Tenant
- Washington Redskins / Commanders (NFL) 1997–present

Website
- northweststadium.com

Northwest Stadium is a stadium near Landover, Maryland, in the census-designated place of Summerfield 2.5 miles (4 km) east of Washington, D.C. It is the home venue of the Washington Commanders of the National Football League (NFL). The stadium opened in 1997 as Jack Kent Cooke Stadium and was known as FedExField from 1999 until 2024.

Northwest Stadium had the NFL's largest capacity at 91,000 from 2004 until 2010 and currently seats 64,000. The stadium is owned and operated by the Commanders, with non-NFL events managed by Harris Blitzer Sports & Entertainment (HBSE). The stadium is expected to be demolished following the Commanders moving to New Stadium at RFK Campus in Washington, D.C., upon its opening in 2030.

== History ==
FedExField branding used from 1999 to 2023

By the early 1990s, Washington Redskins owner Jack Kent Cooke sought to replace RFK Stadium as the team's stadium. Cooke considered a site next to Laurel Park Racecourse along Whiskey Bottom and Brock Bridge roads, but lack of parking and public support prompted him to choose to build instead on Wilson Dairy Farm in Landover, Maryland, within the census-designated place of Summerfield. A special exit, Exit 16 (initially Arena Drive, later renamed Medical Center Drive), was built from Interstate 495, also known as the Capital Beltway. Cooke named the site Raljon after his sons Ralph and John, registering it with the United States Postal Service for the stadium's ZIP Code. Cooke died months before the opening of the new stadium, which his sons named Jack Kent Cooke Stadium. It opened on September 14, 1997, hosting a game against the Arizona Cardinals.

Daniel Snyder bought the team and stadium from Cooke's estate in May 1999, briefly renaming it Redskins Stadium before selling naming rights to FedEx for 27 years at an average of $7.6 million per year. The stadium was renamed FedExField on November 21, 1999. The Raljon dateline requirements and placename were phased out by Snyder by the start of the 1999 season. From 2002 to 2010, the Redskins led the NFL in home attendance but demand declined thereafter. In the early 2010s, 14,000 seats were removed from the upper deck. Another 4,000 seats had been removed by 2015, with a capacity of 62,000 in 2022. 1,500 seats were re-added in 2025 for a total capacity of 64,000.

In July 2023, Snyder sold the team and stadium to a group headed by Josh Harris for $6.05 billion. The following year, Harris's company Harris Blitzer Sports & Entertainment (HBSE) took over operating non-NFL events at the stadium. In February 2024, FedEx announced that it had opted out of its naming rights contract before its expiration in 2026. The stadium was temporarily renamed Commanders Field until a sponsorship with Northwest Federal Credit Union was announced to rename it Northwest Stadium on August 27, 2024. In 2025, the Commanders and D.C. mayor Muriel Bowser announced plans to build a New Stadium at RFK Campus to replace the former RFK Stadium in the city to house the team by 2030.

== Design ==
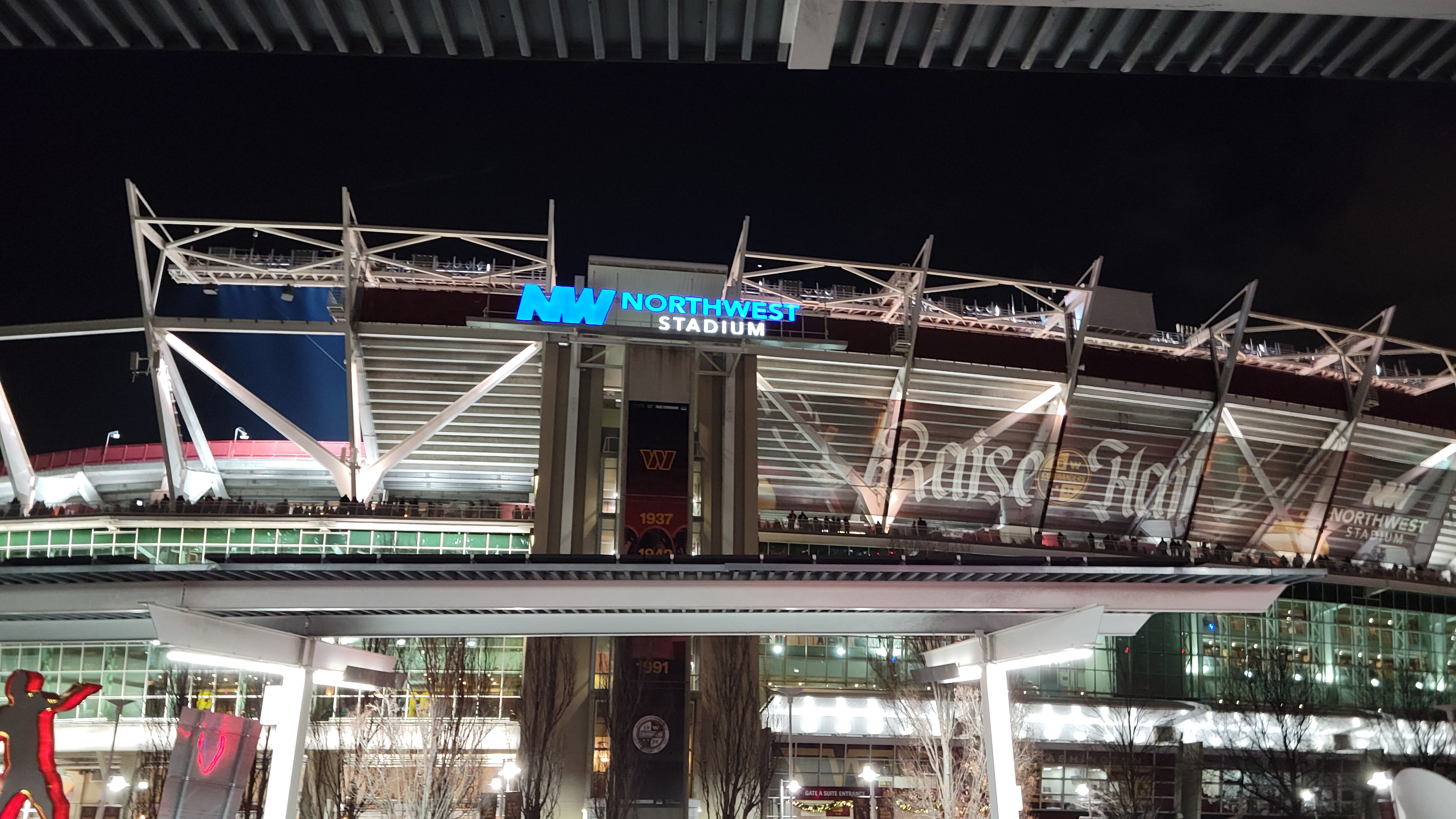
Exterior view, 2024

The stadium has five levels: the Lower Level, the Club Level, the Upper Level, and the Lower and Upper Suite Levels. The Lower Level is named after Bobby Mitchell, a running back and executive with the team from 1962 to 2002. The Club Level is named after Joe Gibbs, the team's head coach from 1981 to 1992 and from 2004 to 2007. The Upper Level is named after former NFL commissioner Pete Rozelle. The stadium had 257 suites as of 2023.

== Other events ==
=== College football ===
Northwest Stadium hosts the annual Prince George's Classic college football game, which is a game usually between two historically black universities. It has hosted several other college football games, including a 1998 game between the Notre Dame Fighting Irish and Navy Midshipmen, a 2004 game between the USC Trojans and Virginia Tech Hokies, and the Army–Navy Game in 2011 and 2024.

=== Soccer ===
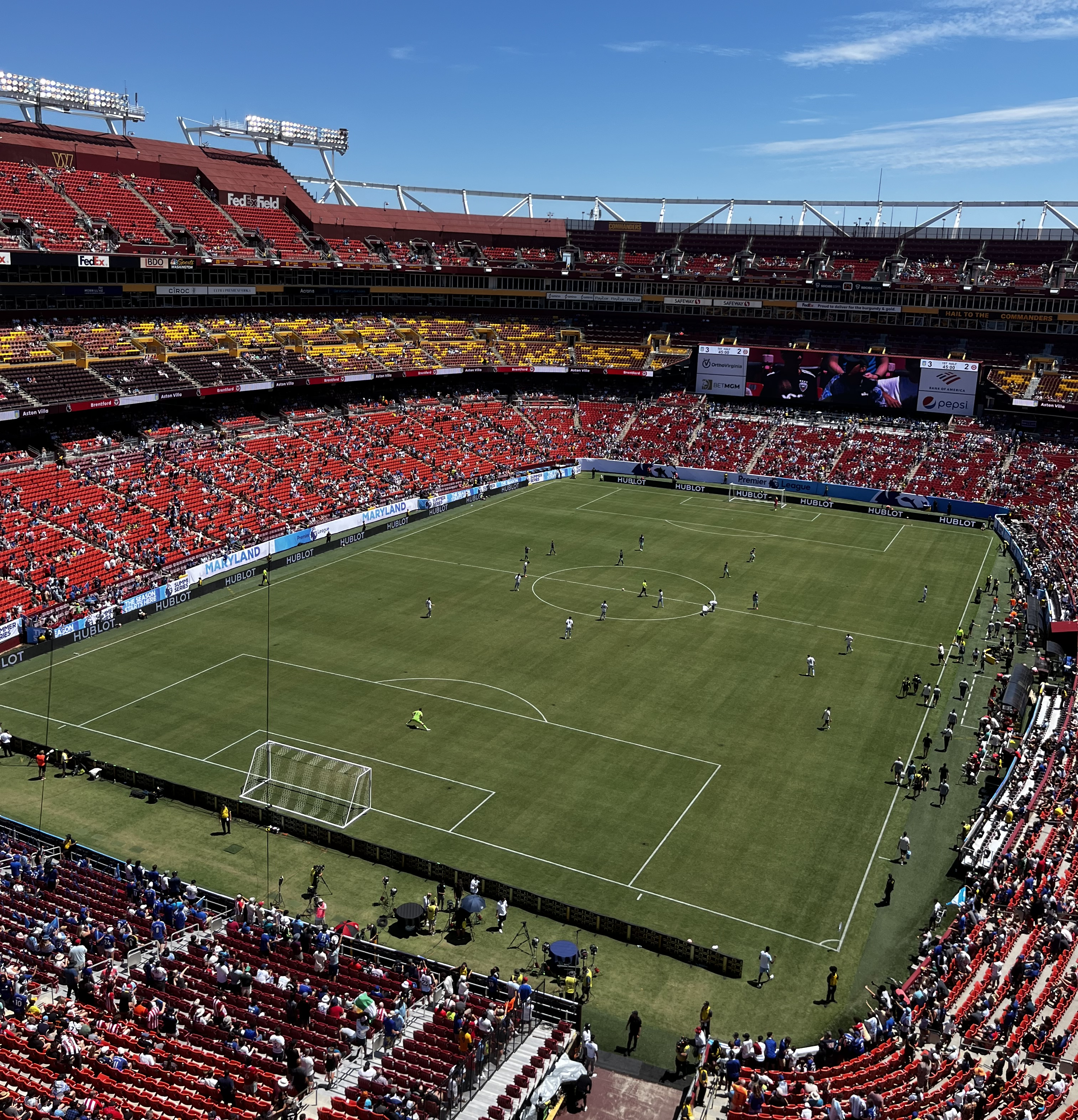
The stadium hosting a 2023 Premier League Summer Series game

The stadium has been used for several international soccer matches. It hosted six matches of the 1999 FIFA Women's World Cup, including the United States' 3–2 quarterfinal victory over Germany. On March 28, 2015, Argentina defeated El Salvador before a crowd of 53,978.

The stadium has also hosted club soccer exhibition matches. During the 2005 World Series of Soccer, D.C. United hosted Chelsea F.C.; the game drew 31,473 spectators, D.C. United's third-highest ever home attendance. On August 9, 2009, D.C. United hosted Real Madrid for another international friendly. On July 30, 2011, Manchester United ended its 2011 summer tour with a 2–1 win over F.C. Barcelona in front of 81,807 fans. On July 29, 2014, Manchester United played Inter Milan in the International Champions Cup. On July 26, 2017, F.C. Barcelona played Manchester United again as part of the International Champions Cup, drawing 80,162 fans and winning 1–0 on Neymar's last goal for F.C. Barcelona. On August 4, 2018, Real Madrid beat Juventus 3-1 during the 2018 International Champions Cup. On July 23, 2019, Real Madrid defeated Arsenal on penalty kicks. Northwest Stadium's bid as a 2026 FIFA World Cup venue was rejected by FIFA in 2021.

1999 FIFA Women's World Cup matches
| Date | Competition | Team | Team | Res |
|---|---|---|---|---|
| June 23, 1999 | Group C | Norway | Canada | 7–1 |
| June 23, 1999 | Group D | Australia | Sweden | 1–3 |
| June 27, 1999 | Group A | Nigeria | Denmark | 2–0 |
| June 27, 1999 | Group B | Germany | Brazil | 3–3 |
| July 1, 1999 | Quarterfinals | United States | Germany | 3–2 |
| July 1, 1999 | Quarterfinals | Brazil | Nigeria | 4–3 (a.e.t/g.g) |

=== Rugby union ===
On October 23, 2021, the stadium hosted a rugby union match between New Zealand and the USA Eagles that drew 39,720 people.

=== Concerts ===
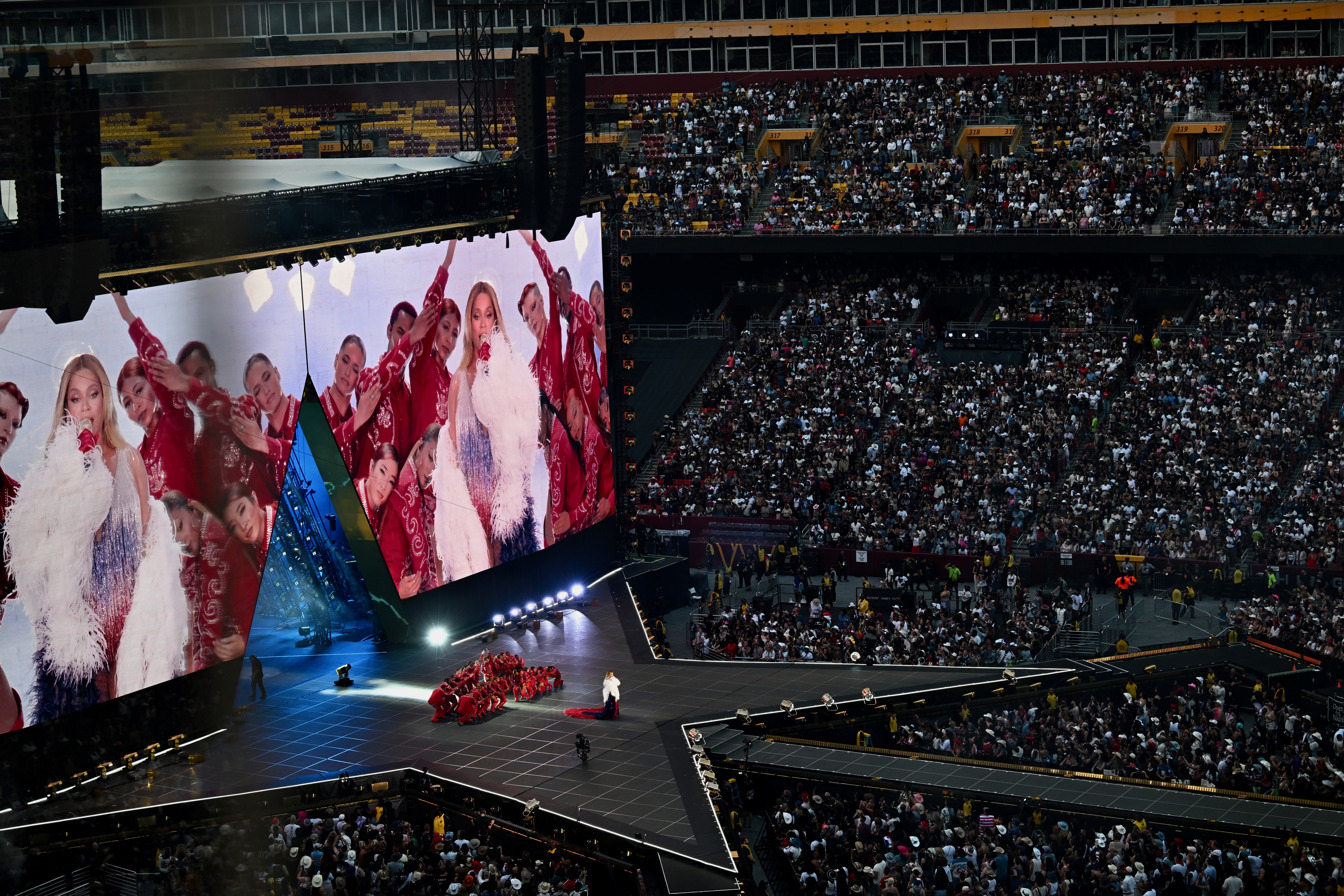
Beyoncé performing at the stadium as part of the Cowboy Carter Tour, 2025

The stadium has hosted several musical events and concerts.

List of notable musical events held at the stadium
| Date | Event | Performer(s) | Opening act(s) | Ref. |
|---|---|---|---|---|
| May 28, 2000 | HFStival | Various | N/A | |
| October 4, 2002 | Licks Tour | The Rolling Stones | The Strokes | |
| July 18, 2003 | Summer Sanitarium Tour | Metallica | Limp Bizkit, Linkin Park, Deftones, Mudvayne | |
| September 13, 2003 | The Rising Tour | Bruce Springsteen, E Street Band | N/A | |
| September 29, 2009 | U2 360° Tour | U2 | Muse | |
| June 4, 2011 | Goin' Coastal Tour | Kenny Chesney, Zac Brown Band | Uncle Kracker, Billy Currington | |
| August 12, 2012 | Brothers of the Sun Tour | Kenny Chesney, Tim McGraw | Grace Potter and the Nocturnals, Jake Owen | |
| June 26, 2016 | Not in This Lifetime... Tour | Guns N' Roses | Alice in Chains | |
| June 20, 2017 | The Joshua Tree Tour 2017 | U2 | The Lumineers | |
| August 6, 2017 | A Head Full of Dreams Tour | Coldplay | AlunaGeorge and Izzy Bizu | |
| July 10, 2018 | Reputation Stadium Tour | Taylor Swift | Camila Cabello, Charli XCX | |
| July 11, 2018 | Reputation Stadium Tour | Taylor Swift | Camila Cabello, Charli XCX | |
| July 27, 2018 | On the Run II Tour | Beyoncé, Jay-Z | Chloe x Halle, DJ Khaled | |
| July 11, 2018 | On the Run II Tour | Beyoncé, Jay-Z | Chloe x Halle, DJ Khaled | |
| April 26, 2019 | Broccoli City Festival | Childish Gambino, Lil Wayne, Ella Mai, Teyana Taylor, City Girls, Trippie Redd, Lil Baby | N/A | |
| April 27, 2019 | Broccoli City Festival | Childish Gambino, Lil Wayne, Ella Mai, Teyana Taylor, City Girls, Trippie Redd, Lil Baby | N/A | |
| July 3, 2019 | No Filter Tour | The Rolling Stones | Ghost Hounds | |
| June 1, 2022 | Music of the Spheres World Tour | Coldplay | H.E.R., Drama | |
| July 30, 2022 | After Hours til Dawn Tour | The Weeknd | Mike Dean, Kaytranada | |
| June 24, 2023 | +-=÷x Tour | Ed Sheeran | Rosa Linn | |
| August 5, 2023 | Renaissance World Tour | Beyoncé | N/A | |
| August 6, 2023 | Renaissance World Tour | Beyoncé | N/A | |
| May 12, 2025 | Power Up Tour | AC/DC | The Pretty Reckless | |
| May 28, 2025 | M72 World Tour | Metallica | Pantera, Suicidal Tendencies | |
| June 2, 2025 | Big Ass Stadium Tour | Post Malone | Jelly Roll | |
| June 18, 2025 | Grand National Tour | Kendrick Lamar and SZA | Mustard | |
| July 4, 2025 | Cowboy Carter Tour | Beyoncé | N/A | |
| July 7, 2025 | Cowboy Carter Tour | Beyoncé | N/A | |
| August 2, 2025 | After Hours til Dawn Tour | The Weeknd | Playboi Carti, Mike Dean | |
| May 2, 2026 | The Romantic Tour | Bruno Mars | Anderson .Paak, Leon Thomas | |
| May 3, 2026 | The Romantic Tour | Bruno Mars | Anderson .Paak, Leon Thomas | |
| July 10, 2026 | The R&B Tour | Usher, Chris Brown | | |
| July 11, 2026 | The R&B Tour | Usher, Chris Brown | | |
| August 2, 2026 | Viajando Por El Mundo Tropitour | Karol G | | |

== Criticisms ==
The stadium is regarded as one of the worst in the NFL. Former team owner Daniel Snyder had been in discussions about building a new stadium as early as 2007. In 2005, eight years after the stadium opened, 1,488 premium "dream seats" in three rows were added in front of what was the first row when the stadium was built. The stadium is about one mile (1.6 km) away from the Morgan Boulevard station, the nearest Washington Metro station to the stadium. Meanwhile, federal regulations prohibit publicly paid shuttle service from public transit agencies when a private service is available.

In 2021, three water leaks occurred near two fans. In 2022, as Philadelphia Eagles quarterback Jalen Hurts was walking down the away team tunnel, a barrier separating seated fans from the away team tunnel gave way and caused several people to fall near him. According to several witnesses, team staff did not show care for or call for medical attention for the fans who fell, but yelled "Get the f*** off the field!". The team released a statement responding to the criticisms, claiming the team did provide medical evaluations on site, but one fan denied that they did claiming that Hurts was the only one who asked if they were okay. Hurts later wrote an open letter about the incident to the NFL, asking that action be taken to prevent an incident like this from recurring.
