= "Awaken, My Love!" =

Studio album by Childish Gambino
- Released: December 2, 2016
- Studio: Conway (Hollywood); ELBO (Glendale)
- Genre: R&B; soul; funk; psychedelic soul; psychedelic funk; psychedelic rock
- Length: 48:57
- Label: Glassnote
- Producer: Donald Glover; Ludwig Göransson

Childish Gambino chronology
STN MTN / Kauai (2014)	"Awaken, My Love!" (2016)	Summer Pack (2018)

Singles from "Awaken, My Love!"
- 1. "Me and Your Mama" Released: November 10, 2016; 2. "Redbone" Released: November 17, 2016; 3. "Terrified" Released: September 19, 2017

"Awaken, My Love!" is the third studio album by the American actor and singer Donald Glover, under his stage name Childish Gambino. It was released by Glassnote Records on December 2, 2016. Its fusion of psychedelic soul, funk and R&B influences was considered Glover's first artistic departure from the predominantly hip hop style of his prior work. The album was produced by Glover and his longtime collaborator, Ludwig Göransson.

"Awaken, My Love!" received generally positive reviews from critics and debuted at number five on the US Billboard 200. The album was supported by three singles, "Me and Your Mama", "Redbone" and "Terrified". It received Grammy Award nominations for Album of the Year and Best Urban Contemporary Album at the 2018 Grammy Awards. The single "Redbone" also earned nominations for Record of the Year, Best R&B Song, and won the Grammy Award for Best Traditional R&B Performance.

== Background ==
On June 17, 2016, after a hiatus from social media, Glover tweeted "pharos.earth", a link to download his new app. The app itself placed the user in outer space looking at a small blue planet while a clock counted down to zero. The app then had the user crash down from space, placing them on a map that was located on Joshua Tree, California. The app then showed the dates of his upcoming performances in Joshua Tree, where the user could also purchase tickets. The concert festival was to debut the album and give the audience the "full-album experience". From September 3 to 5, nearly three months before the release of his album, Glover held three concert performances at Joshua Tree to debut the album. Glover wore glow-in-the-dark paint on his braids and a pink and yellow skirt, with his bandmates wearing similar attire. He performed eleven songs during the concert with minimal rapping, mainly featuring a funk/jazz style.

Glover modified his Pharos app upon its release so that users could watch the success of his first lead single, "Me and Your Mama" at Joshua Tree through a phone virtual reality lens.

== Cover artwork ==
The cover of "Awaken, My Love!" features a photo by New York City-based creative director Ibra Ake, in which model Giannina Oteto wears a beaded headdress designed by Laura Wass of WXYZ Jewelry. Prior to the album's release, the cover artwork was included as an easter egg in the episode "Juneteenth" of Glover's FX series Atlanta. The cover artwork is also a nod to the cover of Funkadelic's 1971 album Maggot Brain. For years, Oteto has accused Ake and his team of avoiding legal contact to actually receive payment for her contribution to the project, and that she is not alone in the fight. "We received low pay. [They] promised residuals. But [we] never received anything... After years of lies and silence then finding out statute of limitation complications... it's been an exhausting, emotional, and overall sad thing to deal with. So it took so much from me especially the fact that we all worked on it with so much love and being proud to represent black artists. All of my lawyers' communications have been ignored by [Childish Gambino] and his team. #bittersweet."

== Singles ==
"Me and Your Mama" was released as the album's lead single on Beats 1 radio and the iTunes Store on November 10, 2016, while "Redbone" was released a week later, premiering on Annie Mac's Hottest Record on BBC Radio 1. On September 19, 2017, "Terrified" was sent to urban contemporary radio as the album's third single.

== Critical reception ==
Professional ratings
Aggregate scores
Source	Rating
AnyDecentMusic?	7.4/10
Metacritic	77/100
Review scores
Source	Rating
AllMusic	4.5/5 stars
The A.V. Club	A−
The Guardian	4/5 stars
The Irish Times	4/5 stars
Mojo	3/5 stars
The Observer	4/5 stars
Pitchfork	7.2/10
Q	3/5 stars
Rolling Stone	3.5/5 stars
XXL	4/5

"Awaken, My Love!" was met with generally positive reviews. At Metacritic, which assigns a normalized rating out of 100 to reviews from professional publications, the album received an average score of 77, based on 25 reviews. Aggregator AnyDecentMusic? gave it 7.4 out of 10, based on their assessment of the critical consensus.

Mosi Reeves of Rolling Stone wrote that ""Awaken, My Love!" is an enthralling trip into the land of funk", while Dan Bogosian from The A.V. Club wrote "Is Childish Gambino suddenly the new Prince, a virtuoso multi-instrumentalist always ready to keep the world an arm's length away from knowing what he's thinking? Is he D'Angelo, a soul god fighting against his first image with all-time great music? No. He is Donald Glover, a man who can perform and write comedy, act in drama, and drop a truly wonderful album on short notice with all the influences and instructions spelled out". Perry Kostidakis of the FSView & Florida Flambeau wrote that "with each successive album, Childish Gambino has exhibited phenomenal growth, but no more than on his latest release. Unflinchingly ambitious and boldly different, "Awaken, My Love" calls back the sounds and themes of the 1970s funkadelic movement to provide a wholly original, emotional and immersive musical experience", with The Guardian's Gwilym Mumford adding "only the limitations of his voice occasionally let him down – he doesn't quite have the range to nail Awaken's more ostentatious vocal lines. Still, it's a minor gripe when there's so much here to enjoy". Jon Pareles of The New York Times said, "It's at once a homage and a parody, equally aware of that era's excesses and its glories, of the way that the most memorable 1970s R&B merged sensuality, activism, humor, toughness, outlandishness, futurism, soul roots, wild eccentricity and utopian community spirit. That's an extremely high bar, but at its best, "Awaken, My Love!" recalls many of those virtues". Tim Sendra of AllMusic said, ""Awaken, My Love!" is a stone-cold blast from beginning to end".

Matthew Strauss of Pitchfork said, "There are times, however, when that nodding feels more like mimicry than anything else. Maybe he'll figure out how to smuggle Donald Glover's heart into Childish Gambino's brain eventually, but if he hasn't figured out what he wants out of Childish Gambino yet, it's increasingly rewarding watching him try". Scott Glaysher of XXL said, "Childish Gambino gets definite props for pushing the envelope and refusing to operate within any genre confinements on this refreshing 49-minute trip through the funkadelic 1970s. While these blurred lines make this album a little hard to follow, "Awaken, My Love!" proves his versatility as a rapper turning over a new leaf". Kitty Empire of The Observer said, "Throughout, Glover's genre fluency is unimpeachable; the only minor drawback is the overmannered air of some of these period pieces, where there could be more straight-up abandon, as on the persuasive 'Me and Your Mama'". Vice negatively described the album as "pure Funkadelic cosplay". Critic Robert Christgau regarded the album as "a seriously overrated piece of romantic P-Funk retro that owes its Grammy nomination to Atlanta".

=== Year-end lists ===
Select year-end rankings of "Awaken, My Love!"
Publication	List	Rank	Ref.
Clash	Clash Albums of the Year 2016	22	
Exclaim!	Exclaim!'s Top 10 Soul and R&B Albums Best of 2017	7	
Pigeons & Planes	Best Albums of 2016	43	
Variance	50 Best Albums of 2016	15	

=== Industry awards ===
Awards and nominations for "Awaken, My Love!"
Year	Ceremony	Category	Result	Ref.
2018	Grammy Awards	Album of the Year	Nominated	
2018	Grammy Awards	Best Urban Contemporary Album	Nominated	

== Commercial performance ==
"Awaken, My Love!" debuted at number five on the US Billboard 200 with 101,000 album-equivalent units, marking the third highest debut of the week. It was the fourth best-selling album of the week, selling 72,000 copies according to Nielsen SoundScan. The album was also streamed 41.5 million times in the first week. It is Glover's highest-charting album. As of December 28, 2016, the album has sold 151,000 album-equivalent units, with 100,000 in physical album sales. On September 27, 2018, the album was certified platinum by the Recording Industry Association of America (RIAA) for combined sales, streaming and track-sales equivalent of a million units in the United States.

== Track listing ==
All lyrics written by Donald Glover, except "Zombies" by Glover and Ludwig Göransson; all music composed and produced by Glover and Göransson, except where noted.

"Awaken, My Love!" track listing
No.	Title	Music	Producer(s)	Length
1.	"Me and Your Mama"	Glover; Göransson; Zac Rae		6:19
2.	"Have Some Love"	Glover; Chris Hartz; Sam Sugarman	Glover; Göransson^{[a]}	3:44
3.	"Boogieman"			3:36
4.	"Zombies"	Glover; Göransson; Hartz; Ray Suen		4:41
5.	"Riot"	Glover; George Clinton; Edward Hazel; Clarence Eugene Haskins	Glover; Göransson^{[a]}	2:05
6.	"Redbone"	Glover; Göransson; William Earl Collins; Clinton; Gary Cooper		5:26
7.	"California"			2:45
8.	"Terrified"			4:15
9.	"Baby Boy"			6:22
10.	"The Night Me and Your Mama Met"	Glover; Göransson; Gary Clark Jr.	Glover; Göransson; Clark Jr.	3:34
11.	"Stand Tall"			6:10
Total length:				48:57

Notes

- ^{^[a]} signifies an additional producer

Sample credits

- "Riot" contains a sample of "Good to Your Earhole" by Funkadelic.

== Personnel ==
Credits adapted from the album's liner notes.

Musicians

- Donald Glover – vocals (on all tracks exc. 10), percussion (tracks 1–4, 7, 8), drums (6), glockenspiel (6, 8, 10), bottles (7)
- Ludwig Göransson – bass (1–3, 6, 7, 9–11), guitar (1, 3, 4, 6–8, 11), synths (1, 2, 6), Rhodes (3, 6, 11), Wurlitzer (6, 7, 9), drum programming (3, 8), mellotron (3), synth bass and harpsichord (4), cello banjo (6), B3 organ, percussion and bottles (7), synth programming and background vocals (8)
- Chris Hartz – drums (1, 2, 4, 7, 9), bass guitar and Rhodes (4), percussion (7)
- Ray Suen – guitar (1, 4, 7, 8, 9), synth FX and piano (4)
- Brent Jones and the Best Life Singers – choir (1, 2, 4, 10, 11)
- Lynette Williams – B3 organ (1, 2, 9), clavinet (9)
- Zac Rae – moog synthesizer (1, 5, 8), B3 organ (1, 8)
- Per Gunnar Juliusson – Rhodes (1, 8), piano (1)
- Thomas Drayton – bass guitar (1, 8)
- Black Party – drum programming (1)
- Sam Sugarman – guitar (2)
- Kari Faux – additional vocals (4)
- Sofia Hoops – background vocals (5)
- JD McCrary – boy soloist (8)
- Gary Clark Jr. – guitar (10)
- Julie Burkert and Steve Kujala – flute (11)
- Dan Higgins and Phil O'Connor – clarinet (11)
- Thomas Parish – woodwind arrangement (11)

Production

- Donald Glover – production
- Ludwig Göransson – production (all exc. 2, 5, 10), additional production (2, 5), mixing (3, 11), additional mixing (4, 6, 7)
- Gary Clark Jr. – production (10)
- Ruben Rivera – recording
- Riley Mackin – recording, mixing (1–7, 9–11)
- Bernie Grundman – mastering
- John Armstrong – organ, keyboard, synths and v-drums recording (1)
- Bryan Carrigan – choir recording
- Chris Fogel – woodwind recording (11)
- Peter Rotter – woodwind contracting (11)
- Andrew Dawson – mixing (8)

Design

- Ibra Ake – photography, art direction
- Soukena Roussi – co-creative direction and styling
- WXYZ – jewelry design
- Sheri Pinto – makeup
- Brad Ogbanna – lighting

Managerial

- Donald Glover – executive production
- Ludwig Göransson – executive production

== Charts ==
=== Weekly charts ===
Chart performance for "Awaken, My Love!"
Chart (2016)	Peak position
Australian Albums (ARIA)	9
Belgian Albums (Ultratop Flanders)	76
Canadian Albums (Billboard)	7
Dutch Albums (Album Top 100)	33
French Albums (SNEP)	188
Irish Albums (IRMA)	28
New Zealand Albums (RMNZ)	21
Norwegian Albums (VG-lista)	31
Scottish Albums (OCC)	49
Swedish Albums (Sverigetopplistan)	54
Swiss Albums (Schweizer Hitparade)	89
UK Albums (OCC)	34
UK R&B Albums (OCC)	4
US Billboard 200	5
US Top R&B/Hip-Hop Albums (Billboard)	2

=== Year-end charts ===
2017 year-end chart performance for "Awaken, My Love!"
Chart (2017)	Position
Canadian Albums (Billboard)	50
US Billboard 200	32
US Top R&B/Hip-Hop Albums (Billboard)	20

2022 year-end chart performance for "Awaken, My Love!"
Chart (2022)	Position
Icelandic Albums (Tónlistinn)	84
Lithuanian Albums (AGATA)	86
US Billboard 200	162

== Certifications ==
Certifications for "Awaken, My Love!"
Region	Certification	Certified units/sales
Canada (Music Canada)	Platinum	80,000^{‡}
Denmark (IFPI Danmark)	Platinum	20,000^{‡}
France (SNEP)	Gold	50,000^{‡}
United Kingdom (BPI)	Gold	100,000^{‡}
United States (RIAA)	Platinum	1,000,000^{‡}
^{‡} Sales+streaming figures based on certification alone.

== See also ==
- List of Billboard number-one R&B/hip-hop albums of 2016
