= Clapping for the Wrong Reasons =

2013 short film by Hiro Murai

- Directed by: Hiro Murai
- Written by: Donald Glover
- Starring: Donald Glover; Flying Lotus; Danielle Fishel; Abella Anderson; Trinidad James; Chance the Rapper
- Music by: Donald Glover
- Release date: August 15, 2013
- Running time: 24 minutes
- Country: United States
- Language: English

Clapping for the Wrong Reasons is a 2013 short film directed by Hiro Murai and written by Donald Glover. The film stars Glover and features producer Flying Lotus, actress Danielle Fishel, porn star Abella Anderson, and fellow rappers Trinidad James and Chance the Rapper. It was created as a prelude to Glover's second studio album Because the Internet and its attached screenplay.

== Synopsis ==
The film is devoid of any real plot and instead focuses on a mundane day in the life of Childish Gambino (who, in the short film, is heavily implied to be portraying "The Boy", the protagonist in the Because the Internet screenplay) as he wanders through his mansion which is filled with his friends he seems to casually acknowledge as being among his residential companions.

Gambino is awoken in bed when Abella Anderson (simply called "girl" in the script) knocks on his window telling him to answer the phone. He does so with the woman from the Califax Collection Company on the other end asking for someone. Gambino asks her "what month it is". When she answers June, Gambino tells her that the person she is looking for is "probably somewhere in the northern hemisphere". He heads into the kitchen to make himself breakfast while his friends Misla T., Emily Carter and Stefan Ponce, loiter inside. As he leaves, Stefan vomits on the floor as Misla and Emily casually stare at him. Gambino heads out to speak with Fam Udeorji stating that "his girl" woke him up only for Fam to claim that he doesn't have "a girl" and that she "might be Swank's". They seep into an unfocused discussion about airplanes, The Cosby Show episode "Cliff's Nightmare" and the Arnold Schwarzenegger movie Junior (though Fam misidentifies it as Baby Mama).

Gambino continues wandering his cavernous mansion and begins working on mixing his music with Ludwig Göransson. Abella calls Gambino away because his brother, Stephen (credited as Steve G. Lover), wanted to speak to him. Gambino finds his room messy and him playing video games while conversing with Jo Swank and Misla about how many vaginas they have seen. While Gambino is amused by the conversation he learns that none of them sent for Abella to call him up and he leaves. Misla is then seen performing martial arts set to Ludwig playing the guitar section of "Flight of the Navigator". Gambino next speaks to Emily while she is swimming. She states that one of his tracks was "not scary enough" and that he "wasn't scary" referring to "Crawl". He playfully pretends to drown her and she splashes water at him in retaliation. He then cannonballs into the pool. He emerges and then exclaims that he has his phone in his pocket.

Gambino is later hanging out with Trinidad James and Chance the Rapper by sampling music. Later, James and Chance play Connect Four and James wins, which slightly irritates Chance. Outside, Gambino and Chance have a push-up contest with the former winning. Gambino is later seen playing "Fruit Snacks" by Kyle on turntables, with Stefan dancing. Abella waves at Stefan who waves back, confusing Gambino as he does not know her either (he was just being "a gentleman"). Gambino is collecting lemons with Danielle Fishel who relays to him a dream where she is at her own wedding, wearing cargo pants, smoking and is three or four weeks pregnant. They head inside when the sound of an airplane is heard.

As the day begins to set, a group of dancers are seen in a room in the mansion with audio from Flying Lotus free styling over. Lotus is sitting in a viewing room with Gambino who also takes part in free styling when the former draws attention to the latter's nose which begins to bleed. He heads into the bathroom and while cleaning out his nose, discovers a long string. He pulls it out and discovers a gold tooth tied to the end of it and proceeds to take a shower. Gambino is next outside by a bonfire with Fam who relays a moment in his life when while in high school, a girl found his number and began making death threats forcing him to live on the street with a gun for a week. Gambino in turn revealed how as a child, a boy his age had to live with him and gave him his first kiss.

Gambino heads inside and encounters Abella again. He asks who she is, but she ignores him. He heads into his bedroom where the phone rings, he picks it up and upon hearing the woman's voice from the morning he abruptly hangs it up and goes to sleep. After the credits, the shot in the morning is identical to the beginning. Abella once again knocks on the window, implying that Gambino's everyday life is somewhat repetitive.

== Cast ==
- Donald Glover (Childish Gambino)
- Abella Anderson
- Chance the Rapper
- Danielle Fishel
- Flying Lotus
- Trinidad James
- Emily Carter
- Fam Udeorji
- Ludwig Göransson
- Misla T.
- Stefan Ponce
- Steve G. Lover
- Jo Swank
- Clara
