= Because the Internet =

2013 studio album by Childish Gambino

- Album cover. The cover is provided as a GIF file, which animates to distort the image after a few seconds. Some physical editions use lenticular printing to imitate the GIF animation.

Studio album by Childish Gambino
- Released: December 10, 2013
- Recorded: 2012–2013
- Studios: The Temple, Los Angeles, California
- Genre: Hip-hop
- Length: 58:01
- Label: Glassnote
- Producers: Childish Gambino; Christian Rich; Ludwig Göransson; Pop Levi; Stefan Ponce; Thundercat

Childish Gambino chronology
Royalty (2012)	Because the Internet (2013)	STN MTN / Kauai (2014)

Singles from Because the Internet
- 1. "3005" Released: October 22, 2013; 2. "Crawl" Released: February 7, 2014; 3. "Sweatpants" Released: June 9, 2014; 4. "Telegraph Ave." Released: August 19, 2014

Because the Internet is the second studio album by American rapper Donald Glover, under the stage name Childish Gambino. It was released on December 10, 2013, by Glassnote Records. The recording process began in 2012 and ended in October 2013. Recording primarily took place at a mansion owned by basketball player Chris Bosh, which Gambino rented. The album features guest appearances from Chance the Rapper, Problem, Jhené Aiko, and Azealia Banks, with production primarily handled by Gambino himself, Stefan Ponce, and Ludwig Göransson, among others.

Because the Internet was supported by four singles: "3005", "Crawl", "Sweatpants", and "Telegraph Ave." Gambino also released a short film titled Clapping for the Wrong Reasons and a 72-page screenplay to go along with the album in promotion of it.

Because the Internet received generally positive reviews from critics. It also performed well commercially, debuting at number seven on the US Billboard 200 and number 12 on the Canadian Albums Chart. The album received a Grammy nomination for Best Rap Album. It was certified gold by the Recording Industry Association of America (RIAA) in February 2016. As of November 2016, the album has sold 992,000 album-equivalent units in the United States.

== Background ==
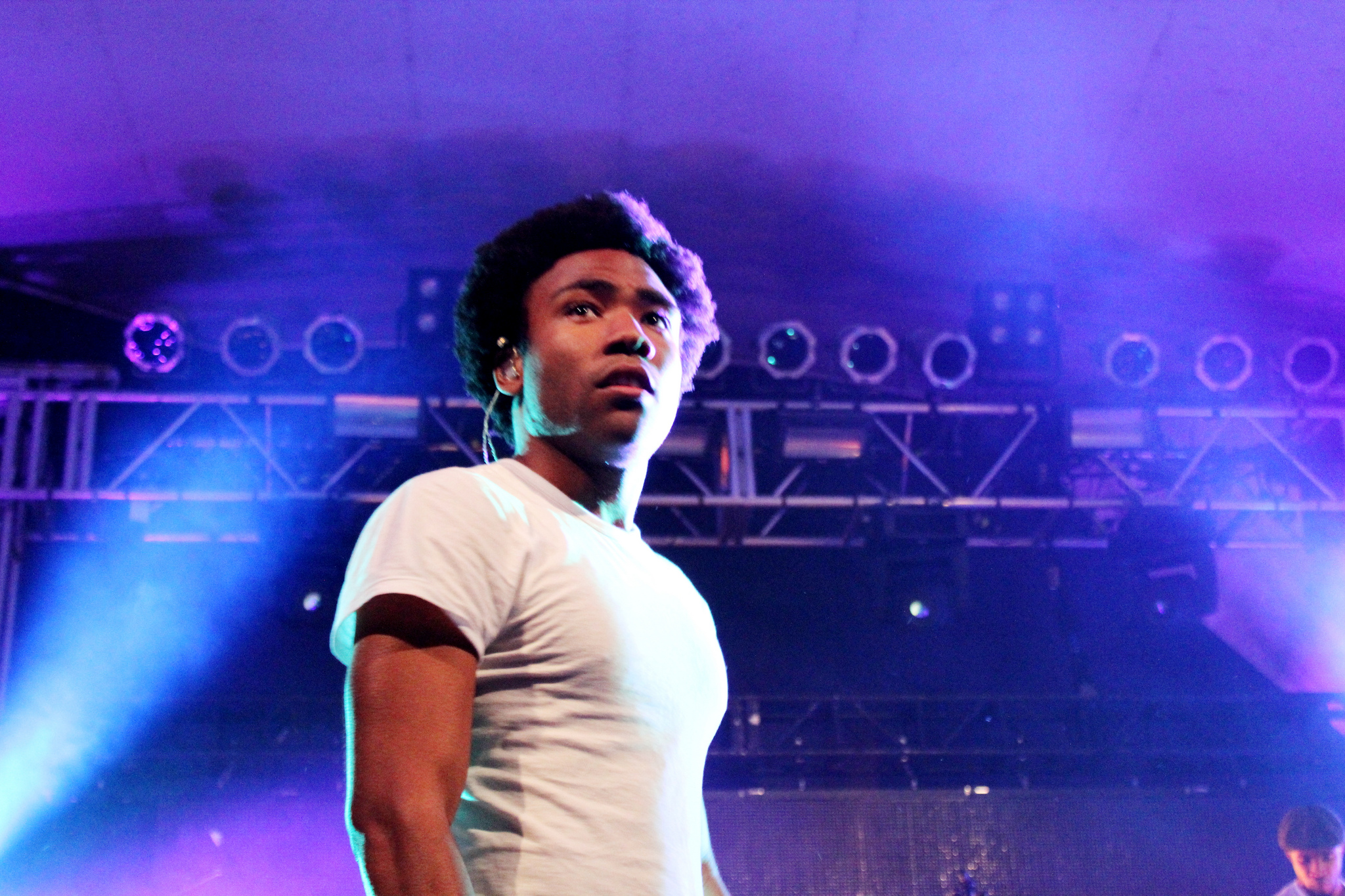
Donald Glover, as "Childish Gambino", was the primary songwriter, performer, and producer of the album.

In July 2013, Gambino signed on to create Atlanta, a music-themed show for FX which premiered on September 6, 2016, and which he stars in, writes, and executive produces. Consequently, he decided to reduce his work for NBC, and only appeared in five episodes of Community's 13-episode fifth season. This also gave him more time for his music career.

On October 4, 2013, Gambino announced on Twitter that his second studio album was completed. He further revealed details at Homecoming Week at Penn State on October 7, stating that "I got a new album coming out soon, so this is the last time we're gonna play a lot of this shit." The same day, he premiered a new song, "Yaphet Kotto".

On October 8, 2013, Gambino released a teaser video for the album, revealing its title, Because the Internet, and that it would be released in December 2013. Gambino told MTV that singer Beck gave him the idea for the album title. He explained the title, saying: "Because the internet I'm here, because of the internet we're all here. It's the language of earth. Everyone keeps saying by this or that year, Mandarin or Spanish will be the most dominant language, but the internet is already a language we are all connected to; even my dad can understand the meme format. But the thing is, there are no rules, which is also the awesome thing."

On October 21, Gambino announced a release date of December 10, 2013, for the album. After the release date announcement, Gambino stated he was upset since Glassnote Records wanted to push back its release to 2014, which he said was because "it's not a holiday record and I'm not a big artist". He responded to this, saying: "If it wasn't gonna be released then, I was gonna release it myself. What's the point of waiting? I feel like that's the only time people would be able to listen to it. December is the perfect time. Albums made a really big impact on me when I was alone and everything was quiet, and I know that's when students go home, that's when everything is closed, so it's a good time to just listen to something and be yourself."

== Recording and production ==
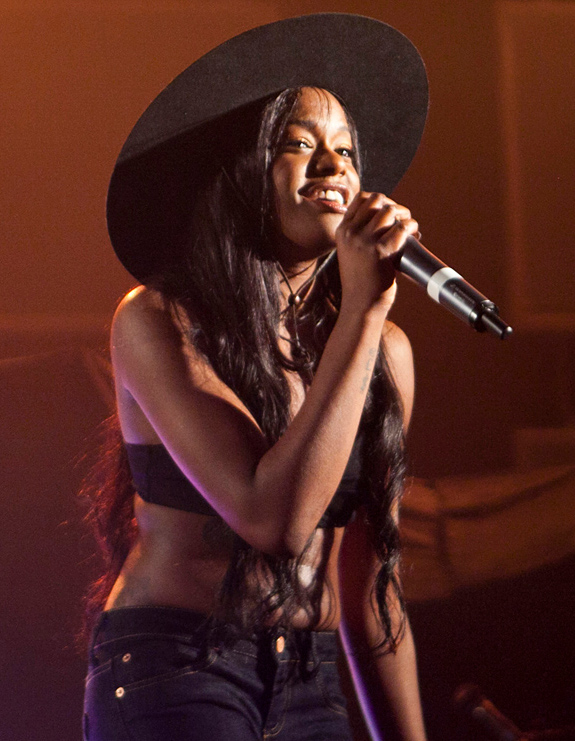
Rapper Azealia Banks made an appearance on the album track "Earth: The Oldest Computer (The Last Night)".

On November 4, 2012, producer Ludwig Göransson said in an interview, he and Gambino were in his studio coming up with new ideas for Gambino's next album. Göransson said it was to be a bigger album than his debut, Camp, with more people involved. Over the following months, Gambino disappeared from social media, remaining reclusive while recording material for the album. The album was primarily recorded in Miami Heat player Chris Bosh's mansion in Los Angeles, which Gambino dubbed "The Temple". There, he kept strict rules, which included "no tweeting or instagramming", "no shoes", and "work begins at 10 am". In October 2013, he revealed that he had collaborated with Kid Cudi on a song, but the song would not be featured on the album. In October 2013, during a Toronto listening session, Gambino revealed Jhené Aiko as one of the album's guest appearances. He also collaborated with American rappers Chance the Rapper and Azealia Banks on the album.

== Cover art ==
The cover is an animated GIF of Gambino staring at the viewer, which quickly fuzzes out after a few seconds (with strong brush-like strokes blurring his features to the point where he is unrecognizable) as if it had jumped at the viewer, in a process similar to zooming in. The GIF format is a reference to the internet, which made it popular. Certain physical versions of the album function with lenticular printing to mimic the animation effect. The cover was shot by American photographer Autumn de Wilde.

== Promotion ==
On January 11, 2012, Gambino announced he would be releasing a new mixtape soon. The mixtape Royalty was released on July 4, 2012, to positive critical reception. The mixtape featured guest appearances by Nipsey Hussle, Schoolboy Q, Ab-Soul, Danny Brown, Tina Fey, Chance the Rapper, Beck, Ghostface Killah and RZA, among others.

On July 23, 2013, Gambino released a promotional single named "Centipede". The song opens with Gambino singing a cappella before "giving way to a spacey beat built around a chunky piano riff" and Gambino's confident rap delivery. The outro of "Centipede" samples a part from an online mini-documentary about and featuring Charles Hamilton, "Behind the Lava Lamp". On August 15, 2013, Gambino released a short film, Clapping for the Wrong Reasons. In the film Gambino previews new music and it features cameo appearances by producer Flying Lotus, actor Danielle Fishel, porn star Abella Anderson, and fellow rappers Trinidad James and Chance the Rapper.

On October 25, 2013, in an interview with Power 105, Gambino stated he wanted to have a "dope roll out" for the album, which he said would also include a film. Later that week, he told XXL that the album would also come with a screenplay. On December 6, 2013, Gambino released a 72-page screenplay designed to sync up with the album. It was revealed on the website becausetheinter.net. The screenplay, which is light on dialogue and involves stage directions that are written out Internet-speak and emojis, was accompanied by short, silent clips from Clapping for the Wrong Reasons, and songs from the album were included to be played as the story unfolds. The central character, The Boy, lives in a mansion and spends his days tweeting at celebrities and posting videos to WorldStarHipHop. Everywhere The Boy goes, he sees the words "Roscoe's Wetsuit". Eventually, he is forced to sell drugs. Gambino prefaces the screenplay with a notice indicating that Clapping for the Wrong Reasons is considered a prelude, intending it to be viewed before reading the screenplay.

On January 7, 2014, Gambino used a video chat with Abella Anderson to announce The Deep Web tour. The tour featured 22 concerts and ran from February 27, through May 3, 2014.

== Singles ==
On October 21, 2013, Gambino released "3005", the album's first official single. The following day it was released for digital download on iTunes. The introspective song was produced by Gambino himself, along with Stefan Ponce and Ludwig Göransson. On November 15, 2013, the song's lyric video was premiered on Vevo. The music video was released on December 6, 2013.

On February 7, 2014, one of the album's promotional singles "Crawl", was serviced to urban contemporary radio in the United Kingdom as the album's second official single.

On November 25, 2013, "Sweatpants" which features ad-libs from rapper Problem was leaked online, which Gambino responded unfavorably to. Shortly after, it was made available to those who pre-order the album on iTunes, as the album's first promotional single. The music video for "Sweatpants" was released on April 14, 2014, which concludes with a dream sequence for "Urn". "Sweatpants" would later be serviced to urban contemporary radio in the UK as the album's third official single on June 9, 2014.

On August 19, 2014, the song "Telegraph Ave.", was serviced to rhythmic contemporary radio in the United States as the album's fourth single.

== Critical reception ==
Because the Internet ratings
Aggregate scores
Source	Rating
AnyDecentMusic?	5.5/10
Metacritic	64/100
Review scores
Source	Rating
AllMusic	4/5 stars
The A.V. Club	B−
Entertainment Weekly	B−
The Guardian	3/5 stars
Los Angeles Times	2.5/4 stars
Pitchfork	5.8/10
Q	2/5 stars
Rolling Stone	3.5/5 stars
Spin	2/10
XXL	4/5

Because the Internet was met with generally positive reviews. At Metacritic, which assigns a normalized rating out of 100 to reviews from professional publications, the album received an average score of 64, based on 26 reviews. Aggregator AnyDecentMusic? gave it 5.5 out of 10, based on their assessment of the critical consensus.

Writing for The Boston Globe, Franklin Soults said, "Love Donald Glover or hate him, this writer/actor/comedian/rapper unquestionably ranks among America's most accomplished performers. [...] The production is as rich as the raps, spanning pop, underground R&B, club music, and psychedelic experimentation. The project is further heightened by Glover's knowing irony, his gift for hooks, and his visionary theme. Without making it a burdensome concept to explain and belabor, the Internet figures prominently throughout the disc in ways empowering and emasculating." Killian Fox, writing for The Observer, said, "Glover reflects on some unsettling phenomena of our internet-addled age, such as the 3D printing of guns – and his restless delivery is matched by jerky, off-kilter production. The results are intriguing, occasionally frustrating, rarely boring." Jabbari Weekes of Exclaim! said, "Because the Internet is a vast improvement over his debut effort, showcasing an artist who has confidently found a way to coalesce his love for music and films into one hybrid effort." Christian Lee of HipHopDX said, "He raps because, well, he can. Most of all, in his ambitious second album Because The Internet, he raps as if to pass the time. Anxious introverts may recognize what Childish Gambino does here, repeatedly: flit around, try to be sociable, but then flee. Childish Gambino still manages to mostly hold our attention, though, because he concerns himself instead with his own terms." David Jeffries of AllMusic said, "Connecting with the album is nearly impossible, understanding it is difficult, and often enough, its inflated ego is irksome, but Because the Internet is too free and fascinating to be dragged down by these complaints, so if a Yeezus with more flash and fun is what's required, Gambino's got the good stuff."

Perry Kostidakis of the FSView & Florida Flambeau wrote, "From a purely musical standpoint, Because the Internet finds itself in contention for best rap album of 2013. Produced almost solely by Gambino (with help from Community composer Ludwig Goransson), it seems as if BTI is the first rap album this year that is completely confident in what it is." Lizzie Plaugic of CMJ stated in a mixed review, "Because The Internet is not easily dismissible, because it's so self-awarely annoying. It trips over its own feet hoping the cool kids will roll their eyes at it, because behind those eye rolls is a jealousy that Gambino can fall with such nonchalance. Even though Because The Internet is kind of strange and kind of a bummer, it does show Glover's range as a musician." Craig Jenkins of Pitchfork stated, "With Gambino's wordplay ping-ponging from caustic wit to message board snark, the enduring strength of the album is its production. Gambino and Göransson handle the bulk of it here alongside usual suspect Stefan Ponce and alley oops from twin act Christian Rich and Flying Lotus associate Thundercat. Because the Internet's production team not only ensures the sounds are pretty, spacey, and jarring in all the right places, but they also effortlessly nail the album's Dark Side of the Moon/Wizard of Oz synchronicity gambit."

Dom Sinacola of Slant Magazine said, "More than that, it furthers the general message of the whole album, which is that for all his posturing and charm, Glover may not have it in him to participate in the kind of bacchanalia required of his position as a young, burgeoning, multi-talented rap star. Halfway between throwaway wordplay and trenchant comment about fame, the lyric says a lot about where Glover's head is at: As a former sketch comedian, writer on 30 Rock, and star of the sitcom Community, he leans on his wit as his most formidable weapon." Philip Cosores of Consequence stated, "Yes, the dedication that Glover has seemingly displayed in the project is admirable. But he just doesn't seem to get music on this album. Maybe it's because of his taste, or because he is trying too hard to stand out, or because of his hubris, or because he has lost touch with reality, or maybe it is because of the internet." Phillip Mlynar of Spin said, "The only reaction that Because the Internet elicits is the uncontrollable urge to skip to the next song, in hopes that things couldn't possibly get any sloppier. But they do, beginning with the cod-wailing that blights "Crawl" and volleying with the psychedelic muzak of "The Worst Guys" (co-starring Chance the Rapper) and "Zealots of Stockholm (Free Information)", which sounds like Glover has inadvertently locked himself in his practice space and is attempting to muster up a loud enough mess so that some kindly passerby will hear his cries for help. As the album collapses into itself with the closing cut, "Life: The Biggest Troll (Andrew Auernheimer)", we're resigned to existence as a gloopy mess of random thoughts. "Where's the line between Donny G and Gambino?" the rapper muses, but it's unclear whether this is meant as a genuine identity crisis or an all-knowing middle finger to critics. Maybe the entire album is a meme itself, a grand existential joke critiquing the all-conquering rise of Internet culture by parodying its overwhelming randomness. Whatever it is, though, it's a bad rap record."

=== Accolades ===
It was named the tenth best album of 2013 by Complex. They commented saying, "Because The Internet is unlike any other rap album this year. Musically, it's as ambitious as something Kanye might do. [...] It only leaked last week, but it's some of the most engaging, rewarding music we've heard all year." XXL ranked it at number 15 on their list of best albums of 2013. They elaborated saying, "One of the most creative albums of the year, actor/rapper Childish Gambino meshes both his talents together for a very innovate and impressive album. He ditches the goofy-comedic rap lyrics with introspective bars that tell a story about a boy who is trying to find himself in life. [...] The music itself is really polished and well-produced, showcasing his growth lyrically and musically as he frequently sings on records."

The album was nominated for Best Rap Album at the 2015 Grammy Awards.

== Commercial performance ==
Because the Internet debuted at number seven on the Billboard 200, with first-week sales of 96,000 copies in the United States. This would be an 84% increase in first week sales in his home country, compared to his debut album Camp. In its second week, the album dropped to number 25, selling 28,000 more copies. In its third week, the album rose to number 20 selling 33,000 more copies in the United States. In its fourth week, the album moved up to number 18 on the chart, selling 16,000 more copies in the United States. Due to Record Store Day, the week ending April 20, 2014, the album peaked at number one on the US Top Vinyl LPs, selling 3,000 vinyl copies. On February 18, 2016, Because the Internet was certified gold by the Recording Industry Association of America (RIAA) for sales of over 500,000 copies. As of November 2016, the album has sold 992,000 album-equivalent units in the United States, and on-demand audio and video streams that totaled 1.1 billion.

== Track listing ==
Because the Internet track listing
No.	Title	Writer(s)	Producer(s)	Length
1.	"The Library (Intro)"	Donald Glover	Glover	0:04
2.	"I. Crawl"	Glover; Taiwo Hassan; Kehinde Hassan	Glover; Christian Rich	3:29
3.	"II. Worldstar"	Glover; Ludwig Göransson	Glover; Göransson	4:04
4.	"Dial Up"	Glover	Glover	0:44
5.	"I. The Worst Guys" (featuring Chance the Rapper)	Glover; Göransson; Chancelor Bennett	Glover; Göransson	3:39
6.	"II. Shadows"	Glover; Göransson; Stephen Bruner; K. Muhammad	Thundercat; Glover; Göransson	3:51
7.	"III. Telegraph Ave. ('Oakland' by Lloyd)"	Glover; Göransson; Rochelle Jordan	Glover; Göransson	3:30
8.	"IV. Sweatpants" (featuring Problem)	Glover; Göransson; Jason Martin	Glover; Göransson	3:00
9.	"V. 3005"	Glover; Göransson; Stefan Ponce	Glover; Göransson; Ponce	3:54
10.	"Playing Around Before the Party Starts"	Glover; Göransson	Göransson	0:54
11.	"I. The Party"	Glover; Göransson; Jonathan Levi	Glover; Göransson; Pop Levi	1:31
12.	"II. No Exit"	Glover; Göransson; Miguel Pimentel	Glover; Göransson	2:51
13.	"Death by Numbers"	Glover	Glover	0:43
14.	"I. Flight of the Navigator"	Glover; Göransson	Glover; Göransson	5:44
15.	"II. Zealots of Stockholm (Free Information)"	Glover; Göransson; Lakisha Robinson	Glover; Göransson; Sam Spiegel^{[a]}	4:50
16.	"III. Urn"	Glover; Göransson	Glover; Göransson	1:13
17.	"I. Pink Toes" (featuring Jhené Aiko)	Glover; Göransson; Ponce; Jhené Chilombo	Glover; Göransson; Ponce	3:27
18.	"II. Earth: The Oldest Computer (The Last Night)" (featuring Azealia Banks)	Glover; Göransson; Azealia Banks	Glover; Göransson	4:42
19.	"III. Life: The Biggest Troll (Andrew Auernheimer)"	Glover; Göransson	Glover; Göransson	5:42
Total length:				58:01

Notes

- ^{^[a]} signifies an additional producer
- "3005" is not denoted with a numeral on streaming services.
- Physical versions divide the album into seven acts: 1 (tracks 1–3), 2 (tracks 4–9), 3 (tracks 10–12), 4 (tracks 13–16), 5 (track 17), 6 (track 18) and 7 (track 19).
- Early physical versions erroneously note Macklemore as a featured artist on "II. Earth: The Oldest Computer (The Last Night)".
- "III. Life: The Biggest Troll (Andrew Auernheimer)" is noted as featuring Donald Glover on physical versions.

== Personnel ==
Credits adapted from the album's liner notes.

- Jhené Aiko – featured artist (track 17)
- Erik Arvinder Orchestra – strings (track 19)
- Chris Athens – mastering
- Azealia Banks – featured artist (track 18)
- Chance the Rapper – featured artist (track 5)
- Childish Gambino – primary artist, creative director, executive producer; producer (tracks 1–9, 11–19)
- Andrew Dawson – mixing
- Autumn de Wilde – photography
- Doc Allison – cello (track 2)
- Jens Filipsson – alto sax (track 3)
- Ludwig Göransson – guitar (track 5), producer (tracks 3, 5–12, 14–19)
- Chris Hartz – drums (track 17)
- Rochelle Jordan – background vocals (track 7)
- Kai – additional vocals (track 2)
- Kilo Kish – additional vocals (track 15)
- Pop Levi – producer (track 11)
- Lloyd – additional vocals (track 7)
- Steve G. Lover – backing vocals (track 3)
- Riley Mackin – engineer
- Miguel – additional vocals (track 12)
- Mystikal – background vocals (track 2)
- Edvin Nahlin – fender rhodes (track 3)
- Yesi Ortiz – additional vocals (track 7)
- Stefan Ponce – producer (tracks 9, 17)
- Problem – additional vocals (track 8)
- Christian Rich – producer (track 2)
- Ruben Rivera – engineer
- Brian Roettinger – art direction
- Sam Spiegel – additional production (track 15)
- Swank – background vocals (track 3)
- S-X – additional drum programming (track 5)
- Thundercat – bass, background vocals (track 17); producer (track 6)
- Fam Udeorji – creative director, executive producer

== Charts ==
=== Weekly charts ===
Chart performance for Because the Internet
Chart (2013–2014)	Peak position
Australian Albums (ARIA)	37
Australian Urban Albums (ARIA)	3
Canadian Albums (Billboard)	12
UK R&B Albums (Official Charts)	6
US Billboard 200	7
US Top R&B/Hip-Hop Albums (Billboard)	3

=== Year-end charts ===
2013 year-end chart performance for Because the Internet
Chart (2013)	Position
Australian Urban Albums (ARIA)	50

2014 year-end chart performance for Because the Internet
Chart (2014)	Position
US Billboard 200	45
US Top R&B/Hip-Hop Albums (Billboard)	11

2015 year-end chart performance for Because the Internet
Chart (2015)	Position
US Billboard 200	123
US Top R&B/Hip-Hop Albums (Billboard)	48

== Certifications ==
Certifications for Because the Internet
Region	Certification	Certified units/sales
Australia (ARIA)	Gold	35,000^{‡}
Canada (Music Canada)	Platinum	80,000^{‡}
Denmark (IFPI Danmark)	Gold	10,000^{‡}
United Kingdom (BPI)	Gold	100,000^{‡}
United States (RIAA)	Gold	500,000^{‡}
^{‡} Sales+streaming figures based on certification alone.

== Release history ==
Release dates and formats for Because the Internet
Region	Date	Label(s)	Format(s)	Ref.
United States	December 10, 2013	Glassnote Records; Universal	CD; digital download; LP	
