= Terrified (Childish Gambino song) =

Single by Childish Gambino

from the album "Awaken, My Love!"
- Released: September 19, 2017
- Genre: Psychedelic funk
- Length: 4:15
- Label: Glassnote
- Songwriters: Donald Glover; Ludwig Göransson
- Producers: Childish Gambino; Ludwig Göransson

Childish Gambino singles chronology
"Redbone" (2016)	"Terrified" (2017)	"This is America" (2018)

"Terrified" is a song by American singer Childish Gambino from his third studio album "Awaken, My Love!". It was sent to urban contemporary radio as the album's third single on September 19, 2017.

== Live performances ==
"Terrified" was performed live by Gambino and McCrary at the 60th Annual Grammy Awards.

== Personnel ==
Credits adapted from the album's liner notes.

- Childish Gambino – lead and backing vocals, glockenspiel
- Ludwig Göransson – background vocals, guitar, drum programming, synth programming
- Per Gunnar Juliusson – fender Rhodes
- JD McCrary – guest vocals
- Zac Rae – moog synthesizer, B3 organ
- Ray Suen – guitar

== Charts ==
Chart (2016)	Peak position
US Bubbling Under Hot 100 (Billboard)	25
US Bubbling Under R&B/Hip-Hop Singles (Billboard)	10

== Release history ==
Region	Date	Format	Label(s)	Ref.
United States	September 19, 2017	Urban contemporary	Glassnote	
