= Lithonia (song) =

2024 single by Childish Gambino

Single by Childish Gambino

from the album Bando Stone & the New World
- Released: July 2, 2024
- Genre: Rock; pop-punk
- Length: 2:59
- Label: RCA
- Songwriters: Donald Glover; Ludwig Göransson; Max Martin; Michael Uzowuru; Riley Mackin
- Producers: Childish Gambino; Ludwig Göransson; Max Martin; Michael Uzowuru

Childish Gambino singles chronology
"Sweet Thang (24.19)" (2020)	"Lithonia" (2024)	"In the Night" (2024)

Music video
- "Lithonia" on YouTube

"Lithonia" is a song by American singer Childish Gambino. It was released as the lead single from his fifth studio album Bando Stone & the New World on July 2, 2024. It is a guitar-driven rock song named after Lithonia, Georgia.

== Music video ==
The official music video for the song was directed by Jack Begert and released on July 22, 2024. The video features Gambino singing the song as the frontman of a band (featuring his long-time collaborator and the song's co-writer Ludwig Göransson on guitar and actor Alex Wolff on drums) in someone's house, and the band members and crowd members begin to pour with sweat as their eyes get more intense and bloodshot. The song is abruptly halted halfway through by a jump scare as Gambino suddenly screams when his eyes burst from his head, covering a young woman in the crowd (played by Suzanna Son) in blood; she screams and runs outside, at which point the scene cuts to her running through a forest as an eyeless Gambino chases her. Her screams can be heard in the distance as an aerial shot of the forest ends the video.

== Reception ==
The single was well-received upon release and was praised mostly for its rock-based production and Glover's vocal delivery. Abby Jones of Stereogum described the song as "dramatic" and "rock-heavy".

Shortly after its release, the single became part of a viral Dungeons & Dragons meme on TikTok, describing the heroic sacrifice of a comic relief character named Fartbuckle. Moises Taveras of Kotaku called the original video "epic," writing, "Gambino [...] definitely did not write a song about a goblin named Fartbuckle, but someone made a video so good that it almost feels like he did." In response, Glover himself uploaded a short animation referencing the meme and the original video's pen-and-paper aesthetic.

== Charts ==
=== Weekly charts ===
Weekly chart performance for "Lithonia"
Chart (2024)	Peak position
Canada Hot 100 (Billboard)	85
Ireland (IRMA)	91
New Zealand Hot Singles (RMNZ)	14
UK Singles (OCC)	88
US Billboard Hot 100	69
US Hot Rock & Alternative Songs (Billboard)	11

=== Year-end charts ===
Year-end chart performance for "Lithonia"
Chart (2024)	Position
US Hot Rock & Alternative Songs (Billboard)	86
