= Broccoli City Festival =

American music festival

- Genre: hip hop, R&B
- Dates: April annually
- Location: Washington metropolitan area
- Years active: 2013–present
- Founders: Brandon McEachern; Marcus Allen; Darryl Perkins; Jermon Williams
- Attendance: 35,000 (2018)
- Website: bcfestival.com

Broccoli City Festival is an American music festival founded by Greensboro, North Carolina entrepreneur Brandon McEachern.

== History ==
McEachern and longtime friend Marcus Allen hosted their first festival event in 2010, in Los Angeles, California to promote their clothing line and Earth Day. Kendrick Lamar, Dom Kennedy, Casey Veggies, Skeme and other popular West Coast artists performed. The Broccoli City Festival was then co-founded in Washington, D.C. in 2013, alongside Darryl Perkins and Jermon Williams, with Big K.R.I.T as the headliner. The festival relocated to Washington, D.C. to promote environmental awareness and health causes in the African-American community.

Rapper Jay-Z was interested in the May 6th, 2017 festival, the year singer and sister-in-law Solange was the headliner. That same year also featured 21 Savage, AlunaGeorge, Lil Yachty and Rae Sremmurd, among other artists.

Previous headliners have included Doja Cat, H.E.R., Megan Thee Stallion, IDK, Burna Boy, Miguel, Migos, Nipsey Hussle, Cardi B, Cam'ron, Future, Jhené Aiko, BJ the Chicago Kid, The Internet, and Anderson .Paak.

In 2019, rappers Childish Gambino and Lil Wayne—with performances by singers Ella Mai and Teyana Taylor, and rappers City Girls, Trippie Redd, and Lil Baby—performed at the festival, which was held at FedEx Field.

The May 7–8, 2022 festival lineup included 21 Savage, Ari Lennox, Babyface Ray, Don Toliver, Gunna, Jeezy, Joyce Wrice, Larry June, Lil Durk, Masego, Muni Young, Rico Nasty, Summer Walker, Tems, Wale, Wizkid and more. The 2022 festival coincided with the launch of BLK Change Weekend, which aims to create a more racially-fair world for Black millennials and Gen Z.

The July 15–16, 2023 festival featured performances by Asake, Brent Faiyaz, Chlöe, Coco Jones, Jazmine Sullivan, Keke Palmer, Mariah the Scientist, Rema and Saucy Santana, as well as rappers such as the City Girls, Fat Trel, Finesse2Tymes, GloRilla, Ice Spice, Kodak Black, LaRussell, Lil Uzi Vert, Lola Brooke, OG Bobby Billions, TiaCorine and Tre’ Amani, among others.
