= 3005 (song) =

Single by Childish Gambino

from the album Because the Internet
- Released: October 22, 2013
- Recorded: 2013
- Genre: Hip-hop; pop rap
- Length: 3:55
- Label: Glassnote; Island
- Songwriters: Donald Glover; Ludwig Göransson; Stefan Ponce
- Producers: Childish Gambino; Ludwig Göransson; Stefan Ponce

Childish Gambino singles chronology
"Bed Peace" (2013)	"3005" (2013)	"Crawl" (2014)

Music video
- "3005" on YouTube

"3005" (album version entitled "V. 3005") is a song by American rapper Childish Gambino, released on October 22, 2013 as the first official single from his second studio album Because the Internet. It peaked at number eight on the UK R&B Chart and number 64 on the US Billboard Hot 100.

== Background ==
On October 22, 2013, Gambino released "3005" to SoundCloud, revealing it as the first single from his second studio album Because the Internet. The following day it was released for digital download on iTunes. The song was produced by Gambino himself, along with Stefan Ponce and Ludwig Göransson.

== Composition ==
Childish Gambino said that he wrote the song early in the morning, as he does with all the songs he considers his best songs. He spoke on the track's significance saying, "Everybody's like, 'It's a love song.' It's kind of an existential thing. I'm just really scared of being alone. When I was little, there was a big dog down the street. I was really scared of it. But when I was with my sister, when I knew I had to protect her, I wasn't afraid of the dog as much because somebody was there. I had a purpose...I kind of feel lost. I kind of lost that, I feel." The song features "deprecating, punchline-packed bars" by Gambino, backed by "his, Stefan Ponce and Ludwig Göransson‘s quirky, futuristic synth boardwork" and a heavy bass. The song has been described as having an introspective and self-referential feel. This song is composed in a key of F-sharp minor and features a tempo of 166 beats per minute.

== Critical reception ==
"3005" was met with critical acclaim from music critics, many of whom considered it to be Gambino's best song. Billboard gave the song a positive review saying, "The elastic '3005' essentially offers a collage of influences by some of modern hip-hop's biggest talent, evoking the braggadocio of Big Sean on the verses and flicking off a hook that would sound at home on Drake's Nothing Was the Same. Like Drizzy, Gambino tries to navigate through his bars before stopping on a dime to silkily croon, 'I'll be right by your side, 'til 3005'." Franklin Soults, writing for The Boston Globe named "3005" Because the Internet's "essential track". David Drake of Complex stated that "3005" is a hit record, with a huge, dreamily transcendent hook.

Andrea Battleground of The A.V. Club stated that, "3005" is a "hook-driven earworm that has a shot at some real radio play." Mike Diver of Clash praised Gambino's wordplay on the song and called it an "easy-pick" lead single. August Brown of Los Angeles Times said, "'3005' is a lush, electro-bendy production where he tries to muster up a commitment to fidelity." Bryan Dupont-Gray of The Daily Cougar credited the song for remaining aligned with the album's theme. David Jeffries of AllMusic said the song, "comes with a chorus so uplifting and bright, it makes the nerdy stay-at-home wallflower at its center sound epic and sexy."

The song was nominated for Best Rap Performance at the 2015 Grammy Awards.

== Live performances ==
On December 10, 2013, Childish Gambino performed "3005" along with "Crawl", on Jimmy Kimmel Live!. He began his performance by shouting out collaborator Jhene Aiko. Then in early February 2014, Gambino performed the same two songs on Zane Lowe's BBC Radio 1 show. At the 2014 MtvU Woodie Awards on March 15 Gambino performed the song, along with "Sweatpants".

== Music video ==
On November 15, 2013, the song's lyric video was premiered on Vevo. The video depicts Gambino webcamming with porn star Abella Anderson as they flirt back and forth with each other, with Gambino typing the song's lyrics. Eventually, Anderson strips down to her string bikini as the video ends. Anderson had previously made a cameo appearance in Gambino's Clapping for the Wrong Reasons short film.

The official music video was released on December 6, 2013, consisting of a long take of Gambino sitting on a Ferris Wheel with a sentient teddy bear that changes his face (not real) throughout the music video up until he disappears at the very end when the teddy bear gets a deteriorated look. The video received a MTV Video Music Award nomination for Best Hip-Hop Video.

== Charts ==
=== Weekly charts ===
Chart (2013–2014)	Peak position
Australia (ARIA)	81
UK Singles (Official Charts)	79
UK Hip Hop/R&B (Official Charts)	8
US Billboard Hot 100	64
US Hot R&B/Hip-Hop Songs (Billboard)	19
US Hot Rap Songs (Billboard)	11
US Pop Airplay (Billboard)	39
US Rhythmic Airplay (Billboard)	8

=== Year-end charts ===
Chart (2014)	position
US Hot R&B/Hip-Hop Songs (Billboard)	50
US Rhythmic (Billboard)	39

== Certifications ==
Region	Certification	Certified units/sales
Australia (ARIA)	2× Platinum	140,000^{‡}
Canada (Music Canada)	2× Platinum	160,000^{‡}
Denmark (IFPI Danmark)	Platinum	90,000^{‡}
New Zealand (RMNZ)	4× Platinum	120,000^{‡}
United Kingdom (BPI)	2× Platinum	1,200,000^{‡}
United States (RIAA)	Platinum	1,000,000^{‡}
^{‡} Sales+streaming figures based on certification alone.

== Release history ==
Country	Date	Format	Label
United States	October 22, 2013	Digital download	Glassnote; Island
United Kingdom	December 2, 2013	Urban contemporary radio	Glassnote; Island
United Kingdom	December 2, 2013	Contemporary hit radio	Glassnote; Island
