= Sober (Childish Gambino song) =

Single by Childish Gambino

from the album Kauai
- Released: September 14, 2014
- Recorded: 2014
- Genre: Neo soul; tropical-pop; R&B
- Length: 4:12
- Label: Glassnote
- Songwriter(s): Donald Glover; Ludwig Göransson
- Producer(s): Childish Gambino; Ludwig Göransson

Childish Gambino singles chronology
"Sweatpants" (2014)	"Sober" (2014)	"Together" (2016)

"Sober" is the first single from American recording artist Childish Gambino's 2014 EP Kauai.

== Music video ==
The song's music video features Donald Glover dancing in a take-out restaurant while intoxicated, trying to impress a woman (Amber-Lauren Jones) waiting for her food. It explores themes similar to Michael Jackson's "The Way You Make Me Feel" music video, but with a different outcome. On March 21, 2015, "Sober" won the mtvU Woodies Award for Best Video Woodie. As of April 2025, "Sober" has accumulated over 120 million views on YouTube.

== Charts ==
=== Weekly charts ===
Chart (2015)	Peak position
US Hot R&B/Hip-Hop Songs (Billboard)	29
US Rhythmic (Billboard)	32

=== Year-end charts ===
Chart (2015)	Position
US Hot R&B Songs (Billboard)	49

== Certifications ==
Region	Certification	Certified units/sales
Australia (ARIA)	Platinum	70,000^{‡}
New Zealand (RMNZ)	Platinum	30,000^{‡}
United Kingdom (BPI)	Silver	200,000^{‡}
^{‡} Sales+streaming figures based on certification alone.
