= Me and Your Mama =

Single by Childish Gambino

from the album "Awaken, My Love!"
- Released: November 10, 2016
- Recorded: 2016
- Genre: Psychedelic soul; psychedelic rock
- Length: 6:19
- Label: Glassnote
- Songwriters: Donald Glover; Ludwig Göransson; Zac Rae; Bernie Grundman
- Producer: Ludwig Göransson

Childish Gambino singles chronology
"Together" (2016)	"Me and Your Mama" (2016)	"Redbone" (2016)

"Me and Your Mama" is a single by American singer Donald Glover, under his stage name Childish Gambino. It was released on November 10, 2016 worldwide, and is the first single from his third studio album "Awaken, My Love!"

It was noted by Billy Gill of A Nation of Billions and Graham Moore of Exeposé for Glover's powerful vocals and the melodic, hypnotizing instrumentals throughout the song.

The song was debuted live at Bonnaroo Music Festival on June 13, 2015.

== Composition ==
The song begins with a lullaby-esque Rhodes piano before suddenly entering the first of three sections this song contains.

This first section consists of a high-pitched psychedelic synth that plays throughout the first section. A simple drum pattern also plays, consisting of high hats, 808s and a bass synth. This section plays for the first two minutes of the song, all the while a harmony of a choir repeat "I'm in love when we're smoking that la la la la la". This first section acts as a juxtaposition to the main portion. Shortly before the second—and main—section, the 808s become significantly louder and the high hats play much quicker, implying that the song is about to enter the second section.

This new section now includes a fuzzy guitar, drums, synths, a choir backing Gambino's lead vocal. A demon-like laughter appears occasionally in the background as well. Glover sings about how he is desperately in love, and essentially cannot live without the woman he's singing about. Despite her flaws, she has an unbounded "hold" on him.

Glover ends his rant abruptly, as the song goes into its last section. The instrumentation is even more fragile than the first, including light guitar strumming, tambourines and shakers, delicately played drums, a Minimoog bass and singers. This section is the lengthiest in contrast with the rest of the song.

== Charts ==
Chart (2016)	Peak position
Australia (ARIA)	75
Canada Hot 100 (Billboard)	52
New Zealand Heatseekers (RMNZ)	4
US Billboard Hot 100	68
US Hot R&B/Hip-Hop Songs (Billboard)	28

== Personnel ==
- Childish Gambino – vocals, percussion
- Ludwig Göransson – bass, guitars, synths
- Chris Hartz – drums
- Ray Suen – guitars
- Brent Jones and the Bestlife Singers – choir
- Lynette Williams – B3 organ
- Zac Rae – moog synthesizer, B3 organ
- Per Gunnar Juliusson – Rhodes, piano
- Thomas Drayton – bass
- bLAck pARty – drum programming
- Şerban Ghenea - Mix

== Certifications ==
Region	Certification	Certified units/sales
Australia (ARIA)	Gold	35,000^{‡}
Canada (Music Canada)	Gold	40,000^{‡}
France (SNEP)	Gold	100,000^{‡}
New Zealand (RMNZ)	2× Platinum	60,000^{‡}
United Kingdom (BPI)	Platinum	600,000^{‡}
^{‡} Sales+streaming figures based on certification alone.
