= Sweatpants (Childish Gambino song) =

Single by Childish Gambino

from the album Because the Internet
- Released: June 9, 2014
- Recorded: 2013
- Genre: Alternative hip hop
- Length: 3:00
- Label: Glassnote; Island
- Songwriters: Donald Glover; Ludwig Göransson; Jason Martin
- Producers: Childish Gambino; Ludwig Göransson

Childish Gambino singles chronology
"Crawl" (2013)	"Sweatpants" (2014)	"Sober" (2014)

Music video
- "Sweatpants" on YouTube

"Sweatpants" (album version entitled "IV. Sweatpants") is a song by American rapper Childish Gambino from his second studio album Because the Internet. The song was officially released on June 9, 2014 as the third official single from the album. It was produced by Gambino himself and Ludwig Göransson, and features ad-libs from rapper Problem. The song peaked at number 24 on the US Billboard Bubbling Under Hot 100 Singles chart. It has had multiple live performances, including during the Childish Gambino This is America Tour. It also features a music video released on YouTube with over 160 million views since its release. It was also featured (in a shortened and censored radio edit) as the backing to the final fight scene of the third episode of Moon Girl and Devil Dinosaur.

== Background and release ==
"Sweatpants" leaked online on November 25, 2013, to which Gambino responded unfavorably. Shortly after, it was made available to those who pre-order his second studio album Because the Internet on iTunes, as the album's first promotional single. "Sweatpants" would then be serviced to urban contemporary radio in the United Kingdom as the third official single from the album on June 9, 2014.

== Music video ==
The music video for "Sweatpants" was released on YouTube on April 14, 2014, featuring over 160 million views since its release. The video was produced by Jason Colon with Danielle Hinde as the executive producer. Its primary director was Hiro Murai; and its director of photography was Larkin Seiple. The video concludes with a dream sequence for "Urn." Glover responded unfavorably to the method of its release, denouncing Glassnote Records on his Twitter page later that day.

The video is seen as a part of a larger screenplay for the Because the Internet album and video series, where Gambino's character is known as "The Boy." The video features The Boy in a diner beginning at a dinner table with his friends; and everytime The Boy leaves and returns to the diner, more of the patrons and employees share his face. The video is filmed to create the illusion of the video having only one visual take. The Dissect Podcast stated that the music video is much in reference to the screenplay, where "this conversation strikes The Boy with a sense of deja vu. He can’t help but see the repetitive nature of their conversation and actions." The repetitive and continual cycle of the music video follows the style of the song's lyricism, where there are mentions of Charlie Sheen and then his replacement actor Ashton Kutcher; so that "nearly every aspect of the first verse gets one-upped in the second."

In an article for Vice by Trey Smith, he states about Gambino in the video, "He also begins to see himself in others, losing his mind trying to find someone he can relate to."

== Critical reception ==
"IV. Sweatpants" has received much critical acclaim, with critic Matthew Kahansky stating "for the first time in my listening, I actually found my head bobbing consistently."

The Cardinal Times made the song their "Song of the Week" on February 10, 2014, stating that the song has "a great beat and a fun fast flow, make this song not only entertaining, but easy to vibe to."

== Live performances ==
Childish Gambino performed "IV. Sweatpants" live at the IHeartRadio Festival 2014 in Las Vegas, Nevada. The song was also a common part of the set list for the This is America Tour. In 2013, Gambino also performed the song at the prominent show Jimmy Kimmel Live, as part of a multiple song setlist while on the stage, where he showed up dressed as "The Boy" character from the Because the Internet screenplay. Gambino performed the song at the 2014 mtvU Woodie Awards.

== Charts ==
Chart (2014)	Peak position
US Bubbling Under Hot 100 (Billboard)	24
US Hot R&B/Hip-Hop Songs (Billboard)	35

== Certifications ==
Region	Certification	Certified units/sales
Australia (ARIA)	Gold	35,000^{‡}
Canada (Music Canada)	Platinum	80,000^{‡}
New Zealand (RMNZ)	Platinum	30,000^{‡}
United Kingdom (BPI)	Silver	200,000^{‡}
United States (RIAA)	Gold	500,000^{‡}
^{‡} Sales+streaming figures based on certification alone.
