= Crawl (Childish Gambino song) =

Single by Childish Gambino featuring Kai

from the album Because the Internet
- Released: February 7, 2014
- Recorded: 2013
- Genre: Alternative hip hop
- Length: 3:29
- Label: Glassnote; Island
- Songwriters: Donald Glover; Taiwo Hassan; Kehinde Hassan; Alessia De Gasperis Brigante
- Producers: Christian Rich; Childish Gambino

Childish Gambino singles chronology
"3005" (2013)	"Crawl" (2014)	"Sweatpants" (2014)

Kai singles chronology
"Need Your Heart" (2012)	"Crawl" (2013)	"Never Be like You" (2016)

"Crawl" (stylized as "I. Crawl") is a song by American rapper Childish Gambino and features additional vocals from Kai and background vocals from Mystikal from his second studio album Because the Internet. The song was released on February 7, 2014 as the second official single from the album. It was produced by production duo Christian Rich and Gambino himself. The song has since peaked at number 86 on the Billboard Hot 100.

== Background and composition ==
On November 22, 2013, Childish Gambino premiered "Crawl" during a performance at College Station, Texas. "Crawl" is an experimental song produced by production duo Christian Rich and Childish Gambino. "Crawl" opens with slasher flick samples. The song has an energetic vibe, featuring a mellow interval with backing vocals from Kai and Mystikal, along with some "Kanye-esque strings." In his verses, Gambino raps referential punchlines inspired by internet memes, such as; "ain't nobody got time for that, ain't nobody gotta rhyme with that," and "hashtag, niggas be like."

== Release and promotion ==
On December 10, 2013, Gambino performed "Crawl" along with the album's first single "3005" on Jimmy Kimmel Live!. "Crawl" was originally released as a promotional single leading up to the album's release, then on February 7, 2014, it was serviced to urban contemporary radio in the United Kingdom as the album's second official single. Also in early February 2014, Gambino performed "Crawl and "3005" on Zane Lowe's BBC Radio 1 show. The song is featured in the video game Far Cry 4.

== Critical reception ==
"Crawl" was met with generally positive reviews from music critics. Drew Blackburn, writing for Paste, said, "'Crawl' borrows production cues from the Kanye and Friends eras of My Beautiful Dark Twisted Fantasy and Cruel Summer. Sonically, it's a grandiose tableau of decadence crumbling with force. Gambino is comfortable here, spewing referential punchlines." Emmanuel C.M. of XXL said, "'Crawl' is a head pounding record that kind of feels like the beginning of a Calvin Harris record, yet it feels like you're about to go on a wild ride." August Brown of Los Angeles Times compared the musical sound of "Crawl" to alternative hip hop group Odd Future. Joe Goggins of The Line of The Best Fit praised the song's production.

== Charts ==
Chart (2013)	Peak position
UK Singles (The Official Charts Company)	150
UK Hip Hop/R&B (Official Charts)	23
US Billboard Hot 100	86
US Hot R&B/Hip-Hop Songs (Billboard)	28

== Release history ==
Country	Date	Format	Country
United Kingdom	December 2, 2013	Urban contemporary radio	Glassnote; Island
United Kingdom	March 24, 2014	Contemporary hit radio	Glassnote; Island
