= Redbone (song) =

2016 single by Childish Gambino

Single by Childish Gambino

from the album "Awaken, My Love!"
- Released: November 17, 2016
- Recorded: 2016
- Genre: R&B; psychedelic funk
- Length: 5:27 (album version); 3:27 (radio edit)
- Label: Glassnote
- Songwriters: Donald Glover; Ludwig Göransson; Gary Cooper; Bootsy Collins; George Clinton
- Producers: Childish Gambino; Ludwig Göransson

Childish Gambino singles chronology
| "Me and Your Mama" (2016) | "Redbone" (2016) | "Terrified" (2017) |

"Redbone" is a song recorded by American singer Donald Glover, with the stage name of Childish Gambino. It was released on November 17, 2016, and serves as the second single from his third studio album "Awaken, My Love!" The song received three Grammy Award nominations including Record of the Year at the 60th Annual Grammy Awards, eventually winning the award for Best Traditional R&B Performance. In 2021, it was ranked No. 383 on Rolling Stone magazine's list of the 500 Greatest Songs of All Time.

== Background ==
Following the release of "Me and Your Mama", Gambino released the song on November 17, 2016, premiering on Annie Mac's Hottest Record on BBC Radio 1, with the DJ describing it as "oozing with soul".

== Recording and production ==
"Redbone" was written by Donald Glover and produced by Ludwig Göransson. In an interview with Triple J, Glover explained:

There wasn't a ton of vocal stuff done ... I think people hear "Redbone" and are like, "Oh, he pitched up his vocals," but there was no vocal pitching on the album—I just sang differently.

Göransson recorded all the instruments starting out from a drum beat that Donald Glover was playing. The intro of the song is dominated by a recurrent slap bass line and the Maestro G-2 wah of a vintage Telecaster that plays the melody while a synth organ makes the counterpoint. An old Rhodes conducts the base chords in D minor as other instruments get in, like a clavinet, a mellotron, a glockenspiel and the Juno-106 synthesizer. The outro part ends with several fuzz guitar harmony licks, a doubled distorted acoustic guitar and some classic piano arrangements. The song is based on "I'd Rather Be with You" by Bootsy's Rubber Band.

== Critical reception ==
"Redbone" was critically acclaimed upon release, resulting in its inclusion in several publications’ year-end best songs lists. Critics primarily praised the track as a faithful homage to P-Funk and 1970s R&B, as well as for Glover's vocals. In a positive review, Pitchfork’s Sheldon Pearce called the track "a full-blown funk slow jam" which "parses love, lust, reconciliation, generations of black soul, and wokeness". Slant Magazine, which ranked the song as the Best Single of 2017, described it as "a creepin’ tribute to the pre-quiet-storm R&B characterized by the Delfonics and the Floaters" and highlighted the "Thundercat-worthy popping bassline" and "insistent glockenspiel diddling strike", with author Jonathan Wroble noting the song's "wah-wah guitar and slap bass, distant chimes, and pitch-shifted vocals", calling them "robotic and soulful at once". Jason Woodbury of Flood Magazine compared the song to "Prince’s erudite R&B" and called Glover's falsetto singing "remarkable". NME ranked the song 14th in its Best Songs of the Decade list, noting Glover's "bold reinvention as a 70s soul’n’funk crooner" and that his singing "incredibly, wasn’t pitch-shifted in the studio". Editors from Rolling Stone included the track in the publication's 100 Greatest Songs of the Century So Far list in 2018, stating that it distilled the spirit of "that Seventies black music that felt like they were trying to start a revolution".

== Commercial performance ==
"Redbone" was a sleeper hit in the United States, debuting at number 75 on Billboard Hot 100 for the chart dated December 10, 2016. The song then re-entered and peaked at number 12 on the chart for the week of August 19, 2017, making it Gambino's highest-charting single at the time (since surpassed by "This Is America") and his first top 20 single. The song became Childish Gambino's first ever number-one single on the Adult R&B chart.

The track was voted into fifth place in Australian radio station Triple J's Hottest 100 of 2016.

== Usage in media ==
The 2017 film Get Out, directed by Jordan Peele, features the song during the film's opening scene.

The song became a popular internet meme, following its re-entry to the Billboard charts, consisting of various remixes of the song in certain themes and scenarios. During a concert in June 2017, Glover acknowledged the meme onstage before leading into a performance of the song.

Contestant Anthony Alexander sang a cover of the song for his blind audition on season 13 of The Voice, earning a 3 chair turn.

During the 2018 Grammy Awards, an Apple ad showing off iPhone X's Animoji effect aired, in which the song was used, with an animated alien head singing the song.

== Personnel ==
- Childish Gambino – lead and backing vocals, drums, glockenspiel
- Ludwig Göransson – Fender Rhodes, synthesizers, Mellotron, Clavinet, bass guitar, electric guitar, acoustic guitar, additional vocals

== Charts ==
=== Weekly charts ===
Weekly chart performance for "Redbone"
| Chart (2016–2022) | Peak position |
|---|---|
| Australia (ARIA) | 27 |
| Australia Urban (ARIA) | 3 |
| Belgium (Ultratip Bubbling Under Flanders) | 15 |
| Canada Hot 100 (Billboard) | 30 |
| Canada Rock (Billboard) | 36 |
| Czech Republic Singles Digital (ČNS IFPI) | 63 |
| France (SNEP) | 142 |
| Ireland (IRMA) | 45 |
| Latvia (DigiTop100) | 92 |
| New Zealand (Recorded Music NZ) | 22 |
| Portugal (AFP) | 34 |
| Scottish Singles Sales (Official Charts) | 79 |
| Slovakia Singles Digital (ČNS IFPI) | 66 |
| Sweden (Sverigetopplistan) | 92 |
| UK Singles (Official Charts) | 51 |
| UK Hip Hop/R&B (Official Charts) | 12 |
| UK Indie (Official Charts) | 24 |
| US Billboard Hot 100 | 12 |
| US Adult Alternative Airplay (Billboard) | 30 |
| US Hot R&B/Hip-Hop Songs (Billboard) | 6 |
| US Adult R&B Songs (Billboard) | 1 |
| US Pop Airplay (Billboard) | 16 |
| US Rhythmic Airplay (Billboard) | 2 |

=== Year-end charts ===
2017 year-end chart performance for "Redbone"
| Chart (2017) | Position |
|---|---|
| Australia (ARIA) | 49 |
| Canada (Canadian Hot 100) | 58 |
| New Zealand (Recorded Music NZ) | 40 |
| US Billboard Hot 100 | 25 |
| US Hot R&B/Hip-Hop Songs (Billboard) | 15 |
| US Rhythmic (Billboard) | 8 |

== Certifications ==
Certifications and sales for "Redbone"
| Region | Certification | Certified units/sales |
|---|---|---|
| Australia (ARIA) | 5× Platinum | 350,000^{‡} |
| Brazil (Pro-Música Brasil) | Gold | 30,000^{‡} |
| Canada (Music Canada) | 4× Platinum | 320,000^{‡} |
| Denmark (IFPI Danmark) | 2× Platinum | 180,000^{‡} |
| France (SNEP) | Diamond | 333,333^{‡} |
| Germany (BVMI) | Gold | 300,000^{‡} |
| Italy (FIMI) | Gold | 25,000^{‡} |
| Netherlands (NVPI) | Gold | 20,000^{‡} |
| New Zealand (RMNZ) | 8× Platinum | 240,000^{‡} |
| South Africa (RISA) | Gold | 10,000^{*} |
| Spain (Promusicae) | Gold | 30,000^{‡} |
| Sweden (GLF) | Gold | 20,000^{‡} |
| United Kingdom (BPI) | 3× Platinum | 1,800,000^{‡} |
| United States (RIAA) | 5× Platinum | 5,000,000^{‡} |
^{*} Sales figures based on certification alone.^{‡} Sales+streaming figures based on certification alone.
