= Aubrey Plaza filmography =

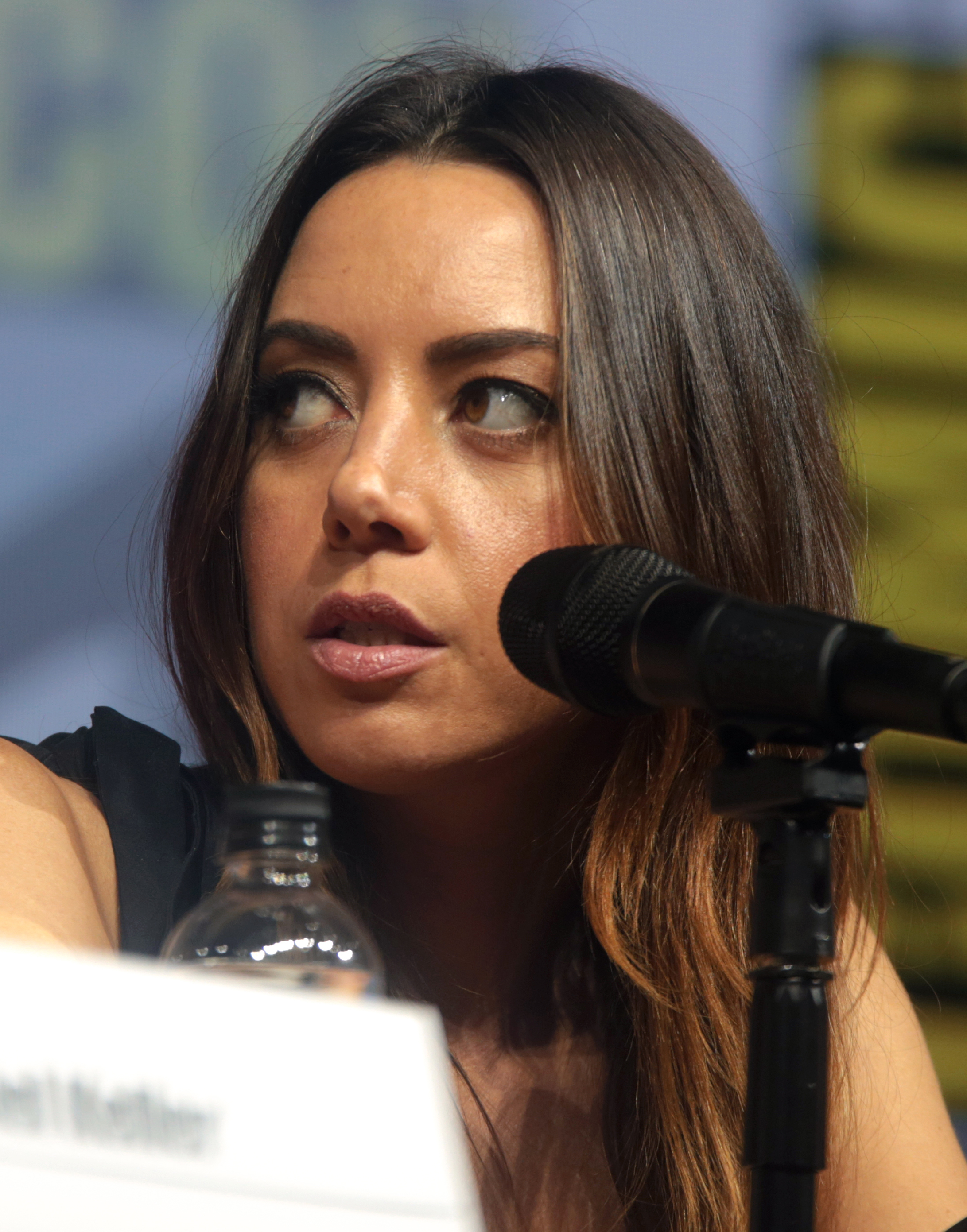
Plaza at 2018 San Diego Comic Con International for "Legion"

American actress Aubrey Plaza began her career performing improv and sketch comedy at the Upright Citizens Brigade Theatre. She made her feature film debut in the 2009 comedy film Mystery Team and gained recognition for playing April Ludgate on the political satire mockumentary sitcom Parks and Recreation (2009–2015). She had her first lead film role as a magazine intern investigating a classified ad in the science fiction comedy Safety Not Guaranteed (2012) and voiced characters in the animated film Monsters University (2013) and television series The Legend of Korra (2013–2014). In 2014, she starred in the horror comedy Life After Beth and Hal Hartley's drama film Ned Rifle.

From 2017 to 2019, Plaza gained praise for her portrayal of Shadow King and Lenny Busker in the acclaimed FX superhero series Legion. She produced and starred in the black comedy film The Little Hours (2017) about medieval nuns and the dramedy Ingrid Goes West (2017) about a mentally ill social media stalker. She then starred in the 2019 horror film Child's Play. In 2020, Plaza played Riley Johnson in the romantic comedy Happiest Season and starred in and produced the experimental thriller Black Bear, for which she received critical acclaim. She made her directorial debut and wrote the episode "Quiet Illness" for the anthology series Cinema Toast (2021). In 2022, she portrayed the title character of the crime film Emily the Criminal, which she produced, and the lawyer Harper Stiller in the second season of HBO's anthology series The White Lotus, to further acclaim. She garnered Independent Spirit and Gotham Award nominations for the former, and an Emmy and Golden Globe Award nomination for the latter. In January 2023, she made her hosting debut on Saturday Night Live on January 21, 2023, the tenth episode and first show of 2023 of season 48, with musical guest Sam Smith. In 2024, she has portrayed the future Elliott Labrant in the comedy-drama My Old Ass, Rio Vidal in the Disney+ MCU miniseries Agatha All Along, and TV presenter Wow Platinum in Francis Ford Coppola's science fiction drama Megalopolis.

== Acting credits ==
=== Film ===
Key
†	Denotes films that have not yet been released

Year	Title	Role	Notes	Ref.
2006	Killswitch	Girl with Head Wound	Short film	
2006	In Love	Julie	Short film	
2009	Mystery Team	Kelly Peters		
2009	Funny People	Daisy Danby		
2010	Scott Pilgrim vs. the World	Julie Powers		
2011	Damsels in Distress	Debbie		
2011	Someday This Pain Will Be Useful to You	Jeanine Breemer		
2011	10 Years	Olivia		
2012	Safety Not Guaranteed	Darius Britt		
2012	A Glimpse Inside the Mind of Charles Swan III	Marnie		
2013	From Up on Poppy Hill	Sachiko Hirokouji	English dub	
2013	She Said, She Said	Woman in Park	Short film	
2013	Failure	Woman	Short film	
2013	The End of Love	Herself		
2013	The To Do List	Brandy Klark		
2013	Charlie Countryman	Ashley		
2013	Monsters University	Claire Wheeler	Voice	
2013	Center Jenny	Monika Nark		
2014	Life After Beth	Beth Slocum		
2014	About Alex	Sarah		
2014	Ned Rifle	Susan		
2014	Playing It Cool	Mallory		
2015	Addicted to Fresno	Kelly		
2015	The Driftless Area	Jean		
2016	Dirty Grandpa	Lenore		
2016	Joshy	Jen		
2016	The Pistol Shrimps	Herself	Documentary	
2016	Mike and Dave Need Wedding Dates	Tatiana Darcy		
2017	Take My Nose... Please!	Herself	Documentary	
2017	The Little Hours	Fernanda	Also producer	
2017	Ingrid Goes West	Ingrid Thorburn	Also producer	
2018	An Evening with Beverly Luff Linn	Lulu Danger		
2019	Child's Play	Karen Barclay		
2020	Black Bear	Allison	Also producer	
2020	Happiest Season	Riley Johnson		
2021	Best Sellers	Lucy Stanbridge		
2021	King Knight	Pine Cone	Voice	
2022	Emily the Criminal	Emily Benetto	Also producer	
2022	Spin Me Round	Kat		
2023	Operation Fortune: Ruse de Guerre	Sarah Fidel		
2024	My Old Ass	Older Elliott		
2024	Megalopolis	Wow Platinum		
2025	Honey Don't!	MG Falcone		
2026	The Accompanist	Sarah	Also producer	
2027	Animal Friends †	DEA Agent	Post-production	
TBA	The Ark and the Aardvark †	Brain	Voice; Post-production	

=== Television ===
Year	Title	Role(s)	Notes	Ref.
2006	30 Rock	NBC page	Episode: "Tracy Does Conan"	
2009–2015	Parks and Recreation	April Ludgate	Main role; 125 episodes	
2011	Portlandia	Beth / Bookstore Customer	Recurring role; 3 episodes (seasons 1–2)	
2011	Troopers	The Princess	Web series; 7 episodes	
2012	NTSF:SD:SUV::	The Rememberer	Episode: "Wasila Hills Cop"	
2013–2014	The Legend of Korra	Eska	Voice role; 12 episodes (seasons 2–4)	
2013	Drunk History	Sacagawea	Episode: "Nashville"	
2013	Maron	Herself	Episode: "Jen Moves to L.A."	
2014–2015	Welcome to Sweden	Herself	Recurring role; 4 episodes (season 1)	
2014	Grumpy Cat's Worst Christmas Ever	Grumpy Cat	Voice role; television film	
2015	Golan the Insatiable	Dylan Beekler	Voice role; 6 episodes (season 2)	
2015	Castle	Lucy	Uncredited voice role; 4 episodes (season 8)	
2016	SpongeBob SquarePants	Nocturna	Voice role; Episode: "Mall Girl Pearl"	
2016	Comedy Bang! Bang!	Herself / Lady Aubrey	Episode: "Aubrey Plaza Wears a Velvet Off-the-Shoulder Gown with Flowers in Her Hair"	
2016	RuPaul's Drag Race All Stars	Herself / Guest Judge	Episode: "Family That Drags Together"	
2016	Drunk History	Aaron Burr	Episode: "Hamilton"	
2016	HarmonQuest	Hawaiian Coffee	Episode: "Manoa Prison Hole"	
2016–2020	Criminal Minds	Cat Adams	Recurring role; 4 episodes (seasons 11–12, 15)	
2017	Easy	Lindsay	Episode: "Package Thief"	
2017–2019	Legion	Amahl Farouk / Shadow King; Lenny Busker (Note: She played a dual role in the show.)	Main role; 27 episodes	
2019	34th Independent Spirit Awards	Herself (host)	Television special	
2019	Drunk History	Cleopatra	Episode: "Bad Blood"	
2019	Crank Yankers	Bernadette	Voice role; Episode: "Tracy Morgan, Adam Carolla & Aubrey Plaza"	
2020	35th Independent Spirit Awards	Herself (host)	Television special	
2020	Muppets Now	Herself	Episode: "Sleep Mode"	
2020	A Parks and Recreation Special	April Ludgate	Television special	
2020	Sarah Cooper: Everything's Fine	Ashley	Television special	
2021	Cinema Toast	Karen	Voice role Episode: "Quiet Illness" (also co-executive producer, writer, and director)	
2021	Calls	Dr. Rachel Wheating	Voice role; Episodes: "Is There a Scientist on the Plane?" & "Leap Year Girl"	
2021	Duncanville	Nina	Voice role; Episode: "Das Banana Boot"	
2022	The White Lotus	Harper Spiller	Main role; 7 episodes (season 2)	
2022	Little Demon	Laura Feinberg	Voice role; 10 episodes (also executive producer)	
2022	The Simpsons	Amber Duffman	Voice role; Episode: "From Beer to Paternity"	
2023	Saturday Night Live	Herself / April Ludgate	Episode: "Aubrey Plaza/Sam Smith"	
2023	Scott Pilgrim Takes Off	Julie Powers	Voice role; 5 episodes	
2024	Monsters at Work	Claire Wheeler-Worthington	Voice role; 3 episodes (season 2)	
2024	Agatha All Along	Rio Vidal / Death; also contributed to soundtrack	Miniseries; 6 episodes	
2025	Sesame Street	Miss Noodle	Episode: "Big Bird's Big Solo"	
2026	Kevin	Dana	Voice role; 8 episodes (also creator, writer, and executive producer)	

=== Theatre ===
Year	Title	Role	Playwright	Location	Ref.
2005	Rebel Without a Cause	Judy Brown	Stewart Stern	American Theatre of Actors, Off-Broadway	
2023–24	Danny and the Deep Blue Sea	Roberta	John Patrick Shanley	Lucille Lortel Theatre, Off-Broadway	
2025	Let's Love!	Susan	Ethan Coen	Atlantic Theater Company, Off-Broadway	

=== Music videos ===
Year	Title	Artist(s)	Role	Ref.
2012	"Hollywood Forever Cemetery Sings"	Father John Misty	Girl	
2013	"Rouse Yourself"	JC Brooks & the Uptown Sound	Girl	
2014	"Bona Fide"	Cassorla	Woman in Boat	

== Filmmaking credits ==
Year	Title	Director	Producer	Writer	Notes	Ref.
2017	The Little Hours	No	Yes	No		
2017	Ingrid Goes West	No	Yes	No		
2020	Black Bear	No	Yes	No		
2021	Cinema Toast	Yes	No	Yes	TV series; episode "Quiet Illness"	
2022	Little Demon	No	Executive	No	TV series	
2022	Emily the Criminal	No	Yes	No		
2026	Kevin	No	Executive	Yes	TV series	
2026	The Accompanist	No	Yes	No		
