= List of Legion characters =

Legion is an American surrealist superhero thriller television series created for FX by Noah Hawley, based on the Marvel Comics character David Haller / Legion. The first season, consisting of eight episodes, aired from February to March 2017. The second season began airing in April 2018.

Dan Stevens stars as Haller, a mutant diagnosed with schizophrenia at a young age. Also starring in the first season are Rachel Keller as Syd Barrett, Aubrey Plaza as Lenny Busker, Bill Irwin as Cary Loudermilk, Jeremie Harris as Ptonomy Wallace, Amber Midthunder as Kerry Loudermilk, Katie Aselton as Amy Haller, and Jean Smart as Melanie Bird. Aselton returned as Amy briefly in the second season, when Jemaine Clement and Hamish Linklater were promoted from guest roles to series regulars and Navid Negahban joined the cast. Lauren Tsai joined the cast in the third and final season.

== Overview ==
Character	Portrayed by	Appearances			
Character	Portrayed by	First	Season 1	Season 2	Season 3
Main characters
David Haller Legion	Dan Stevens	"Chapter 1"	Main	Main	Main
Syd Barrett	Rachel Keller	"Chapter 1"	Main	Main	Main
Lenny Busker The Breakfast Queen	Aubrey Plaza	"Chapter 1"	Main	Main	Main
Amahl Farouk The Shadow King (Note: Quinton Boisclair portrays Farouk in the form of "The Devil with the Yellow Eyes" (recurring seasons 1 & 3; guest season 2) and Devyn Dalton plays him in the form of "The Angry Boy" (recurring season 1; guest seasons 2–3).)	Aubrey Plaza	"Chapter 1"	Main (Note: Although part of the main cast, Plaza only appears as Farouk in two episodes of season two.)	Main	
Amahl Farouk The Shadow King	Navid Negahban	"Chapter 9"		Main	Main
Ptonomy Wallace	Jeremie Harris	"Chapter 1"	Main	Main	Main
Kerry Loudermilk	Amber Midthunder	"Chapter 1"	Main	Main	Main
Melanie Bird	Jean Smart	"Chapter 1"	Main	Main	Guest
Amy Haller	Katie Aselton	"Chapter 1"	Main	Recurring	
Cary Loudermilk	Bill Irwin	"Chapter 2"	Main	Main	Main
Clark Debussy	Hamish Linklater	"Chapter 1"	Recurring	Main	Main
Oliver Bird	Jemaine Clement	"Chapter 4"	Recurring	Main	Guest
Jia-Yi Switch	Lauren Tsai	"Chapter 20"			Main
Recurring characters
Brubaker	David Selby	"Chapter 1"	Recurring	Guest	
Philly	Ellie Araiza	"Chapter 1"	Recurring		
Rudy	Brad Mann	"Chapter 1"	Recurring		
Walter The Eye	Mackenzie Gray	"Chapter 1"	Recurring		
Henry Poole	Scott Lawrence	"Chapter 2"	Recurring		
Daniel Bohr-Debussy	Keir O'Donnell	"Chapter 8"	Guest		Recurring
The Vermillion	Caitlin Leahy	"Chapter 9"		Recurring	Recurring
The Narrator	Jon Hamm	"Chapter 9"		Recurring	
Admiral Fukyama	Marc Oka	"Chapter 9"		Recurring	
The Monk	Nathan Hurd	"Chapter 9"		Recurring	
Salmon	Vanessa Dubasso	"Chapter 17"		Guest	Recurring
Charles Xavier	Harry Lloyd	"Chapter 22"			Recurring
Gabrielle Xavier	Stephanie Corneliussen	"Chapter 22"			Recurring

== Main characters ==
=== David Haller / Legion ===
David Haller (portrayed by Dan Stevens) is the mutant son of Charles and Gabrielle Xavier. Haller was diagnosed with schizophrenia at a young age and following a suicide attempt was placed into Clockworks Psychiatric Hospital, where he meets and falls in love with Syd Barrett. After joining the Summerland group led by Melanie Bird, David is told that his schizophrenia was a lie, and he is in fact a powerful psychic mutant with advanced telepathic and telekinetic capabilities. In their labor to harness his powers, David and people at Summerland discover that something else exists inside his mind. It is eventually revealed to David by his sister that he was adopted; he comes to the conclusion that his real father gave him away in an attempt to protect him from the Shadow King, a psychic parasite that infested David's mind at a young age. After being trapped in a high-tech orb for a year, he finds that Summerland has joined forces with Division 3 to stop the Shadow King. In the second season, after revealing his own true villainous nature and raping Syd, David goes on the run from Division 3 with Lenny as they set up a cult. In the third season, gaining Switch as an ally and seeking to change history, David calls himself Legion.

Stevens was cast in February 2016, and joined the series because of showrunner Noah Hawley's involvement, and after exploring the source material. Casting Stevens alleviated Hawley's concerns about focusing the series on David's internal issues, as "he's very vulnerable and also very strong" and can be endearing to the audience. Hawley created a 160-track playlist to help Stevens understand David's mindset, which included "everything from experimental French sound design, people screaming into bins and such, to Pink Floyd and everything in between." Stevens also did extensive research on mental health to prepare for the role, talking to both sufferers and doctors. He felt this allowed him to "really [take] on board" the "vividness of the reality", and said that there are "different ways of perceiving crazy people ... it's such a misunderstood condition." Hawley and the cast kept secrets from Stevens about the character and plot so that the actor could identify with David's confusion about reality.

David's earlier life is shown in several flashbacks and dream sequences, with the character portrayed by Tobias Austen and Noah Hegglin Houben as an infant, Sebastian Billinsley-Rodriguez as a toddler, Christian Convery as a four-year-old, Luke Roessler as a six-to-eight-year-old, Jacob Hoppenbrouwer as a ten-to-twelve-year-old, and Alex Mulgrew as a sixteen-year-old.

=== Syd Barrett ===
Sydney "Syd" Barrett (portrayed by Rachel Keller) is a mutant with the power to involuntarily body-swap with anyone she makes skin contact with. Though she is aware of the nature of her powers from young age, she is treated in Clockworks Psychiatric Hospital for her manic refusal to make tactile contact with anyone. She meets David and becomes his girlfriend; the two reunite shortly after leaving the hospital and join the Summerland crew. As David learns to control his powers, he creates a room for himself and Syd on the astral plane, where they are able to touch and have sex with each other. After Syd leaves David in the second season, he wipes her memories of their breakup and rapes her; on being uncovered, Legion goes on the run, forming a cult around him, while pursued by Syd, the Shadow King, and Division 3.

Keller was cast as the female lead in January 2016, after her breakout role in the second season of Hawley's Fargo. She was revealed to be playing Barrett a month later. Because of her abilities, the character is portrayed as "withdrawn", the opposite of Keller's Fargo role. The character is named after Roger "Syd" Barrett of the rock band Pink Floyd, whose music was an important influence on the series for Hawley. Audrey Lynn portrays a 6-year-old Syd, Violet Hicks portrays a young Syd, and Pearl Amanda Dickson portrays a teenage Syd.

=== Lenny Busker ===
Lenore "Lenny" Busker (portrayed by Aubrey Plaza) is David's friend with a history of drug and alcohol abuse. She is treated in Clockworks Psychiatric Hospital alongside him, and killed in the first episode when Syd Barrett switches bodies with David and accidentally loses control of his powers. Lenny later reappears as a figure in David's mind, until it is revealed that this is one of the many forms used by the Shadow King to manipulate him. In Season 2, Lenny is still longing for a new body. Using a device stolen from Division 3 and a tissue sample of Lenny, Amahl Farouk and Oliver Bird use Amy Haller's body for Lenny's rebirth. In Season 3, Lenny is a part of David's cult as "The Breakfast Queen" and has developed a relationship with a cult member named Salmon, with whom she has a child. The amount of distress caused by the Time Eaters, experiencing living a life and raising their child up until their natural death in a matter of minutes, leads Lenny to committing suicide by stabbing herself in the neck.

Plaza was cast in February 2016. Busker was originally written for a middle aged man, until Hawley met Plaza and rethought the character. Plaza insisted that the character's dialogue not be changed for her, instead choosing to play the character as both male and female. This led to Busker "making crass remarks about women and muttering vintage phrases". Plaza's performance, which she described as kind of "unisex, androgynous", was inspired by David Bowie. While preparing for the role, Plaza decided that Busker's hands would be covered with small henna tattoos, which had to be applied every day before filming.

=== Cary Loudermilk ===
Cary Loudermilk (portrayed by Bill Irwin) is a "geeky scientist", one of Bird's specialists and was among the founders of Summerland. From the young age, he shares the body with Kerry Loudermilk, who can leave and act as a separate person whenever she wishes, but only ages while she's outside, leading to an eventual age gap between them by the time of the series. In Season Two, Amahl Farouk does something so that Cary is temporarily the one that retracts into Kerry's body. In Season Three, David uses Cary to find a way to enhance Switch's abilities, making it possible to escape with Switch during an attack by the Time Eaters.

The character is introduced in the second episode, but Hawley sought to cast Irwin, for his "playful approach to characters", during filming on the pilot, before the character's role had been written. Hawley "had to pitch him the weird, crazy character dynamic and that the show is about memory and identity", and Irwin agreed to join the project. His addition to the cast was revealed with the show's full series order in May 2016. Nicky Evans portrays Cary as an eight-year-old.

=== Ptonomy Wallace ===
Ptonomy Wallace (portrayed by Jeremie Harris), is a mutant and one of Bird's specialists in Summerland. He possesses the perfect memory, remembering everything from before his birth, and has the power to take himself and others into other people's memories to explore them. After being badly injured by the parasite that was placed in him by Shadow King, Ptonomy's life is saved by the Vermillion who place him in the Mainframe. During Division 3's hunt for David, Ptonomy is downloaded in a robot look-alike by the Vermillion where this form sports a moustache.

Harris was cast in late February 2016. Gabriel Jacob-Cross portrays Ptonomy as a five-year-old.

=== Kerry Loudermilk ===
Kerry Loudermilk (portrayed by Amber Midthunder) is a savant with a "childlike sense of wonder", who lives inside Cary's body. Cary was not aware of her presence for the first few years of his life, as Kerry only manifests as a separate person whenever she wishes to. Cary is the son of Native American parents, so his father left his mother after they had a white son, thinking she had been adulterous. Kerry later appeared as the native daughter her parents had expected. Cary first thought she was his imaginary friend, but later realized that she actually lived inside him. Presumably, both Kerry and Cary are mutants. Kerry never experienced things such as sleeping or eating, which she finds boring and leaves to Cary. Instead, she lives for action of all sorts, including hand-to-hand fighting. Born at the same time as Cary, Kerry only ages while she's outside of his body, which is why she's in her mid-twenties, while Cary is in his late fifties. In Season 2, Amahl Farouk makes it that Kerry is the one who retracts Cary into her body. The side effect being that Kerry now ages. In Season 3, Kerry joins Division 3's hunt for David. When David's cult invades the airship, Kerry kills most of them even when Syd briefly appears in his body. David regains control of his body and knocks out Kerry.

Midthunder was cast in late February 2016. Tylayla Baker portrays Kerry as an eight-year-old.

=== Amy Haller ===
Amy Haller (portrayed by Katie Aselton) is David's older sister, who tries to remain positive despite his history of mental illness. In Season 2, Amy was living in a house under Division 3 protection until Amahl Farouk and Oliver Bird use a device stolen from Division 3 and Lenny Busker's tissue sample to make Lenny be reborn in Amy's body. This discovery causes David to telepathically vow to Farouk that he will be coming for him. Amy appeared in Lenny's vision advising her to help David against Shadow King.

Aselton was cast in the role in March 2016. Hawley said that she defined herself as normal "against her brother. She finds herself being looked at as if she might be crazy, as well." Kyja Sutton portrays Amy as an eight-to-ten-year-old.

=== Melanie Bird ===
Melanie Bird (portrayed by Jean Smart) is a demanding psychiatric therapist who uses "unconventional" methods to assist mutants, while also offering them protection by hiding them from the Government Division 3 in Summerland. Her husband Oliver has been lost on the astral plane for the past 20 years, while his body was cryogenically frozen. Melanie and the Summerland crew rescue David from Division 3 and teach him to control his powers, because she believes him and his powers to be the key to winning the then-ongoing war. In the third season, Melanie and Oliver are shown in the Astral Plane where they get Syd's lost mind back to its current age while contending with Wolf.

Smart was cast in February 2016, joining the series immediately when asked by Hawley, despite knowing nothing of the show and its source material, due to her previous Emmy-nominated work with Hawley on Fargo.

=== Amahl Farouk / Shadow King ===
Amahl Farouk (portrayed by Navid Negahban; Aubrey Plaza in the form of Lenny Busker) is a psychic mutant known as the Shadow King, whose consciousness has inhabited David's body as a parasite, feeding off his mutant abilities, since childhood. He manifests himself to David in multiple forms, including David's childhood dog "King", "The Angry Boy" (portrayed by Devyn Dalton), "The Devil with the Yellow Eyes" (portrayed by Quinton Boisclair), and "Lenny Busker" following her death. By the end of the first season, Farouk has possessed Oliver Bird. Through Oliver Bird in Season 2, he continues to search for his original body and does things use a combination of a stolen Division 3 device and Lenny's tissue for Lenny's rebirth in Amy Haller's body. He later finds out about the threat that David would cause, leading to Division 3 planning to dispose of David. In season 3, Shadow King assists in the hunt for David where he has a brief encounter with Switch on the astral plane. He even had a knowledge about the Time Eaters when they appear. When David invades the airship upon him baiting him, Amahl attacks David until Switch is freed, and she sends him to the Time Between Time.

The malevolent presence in David's mind was teased throughout the first season, before being confirmed as the Shadow King in the season's penultimate episode. The character takes on several different forms throughout the season. In July 2017, Hawley announced that Saïd Taghmaoui had joined the cast for the second season, and would portray the Shadow King's true form, Amahl Farouk. In November, during production on the season, Taghmaoui announced that he was no longer involved with the series, and FX confirmed that "a decision was made to recast" the role of Farouk. Navid Negahban was revealed to have taken over the role in January 2018. Hawley explained that Taghmaoui had not been "a great fit", leading to the recast. Negahban is a series regular for the second season.

Negahban had just completed work on Aladdin (2019) when Hawley contacted him about taking on the role, and he watched the first season of the series during a weekend before joining the production. Production on the eighth episode was underway when Negahban arrived, and he had to reshoot the character's scenes for the first seven episodes. Negahban worked with the other actors, including Stevens and Plaza, to track the development of the Shadow King through the series, and was given a map by the writers that helped explain his character's backstory. For a scene where the character speaks fluent French, Stevens helped Negahban with his pronunciation.

==== The Devil with the Yellow Eyes ====
The Devil with the Yellow Eyes (portrayed by Quinton Boisclair) is a grotesque creature that haunts Haller, one of the forms of the Shadow King.

Boisclair was cast as the Devil with the Yellow Eyes for his physique, with Hawley describing him as "just someone they found at a comic book store who happened to be 6'8" and very skinny. The production created a prosthetic suit for Boisclair to wear in the show, for which production designer Michael Wylie was inspired by the reality series My 600-lb Life. Hawley explained that "whatever was inside David had to be feeding on him all the time, and as a result it was something engorged or tick-like about it, so it was reaching this very corpulent state." He also compared the character to Bob in Twin Peaks, saying that the Devil appears "detached from information in the first couple of hours. It's compelling because it's such a horrifying image, and we know that it means something, but we don't know what it means."

==== Angry Boy ====
The Angry Boy (portrayed by Devyn Dalton) is a form of the Shadow King, based on the titled character of the children's book The World's Angriest Boy in the World.

=== Oliver Bird ===
Oliver Bird (portrayed by Jemaine Clement) is Melanie's mutant husband and one of the founders of Summerland. Like David, he appears to possess vast psychic/reality warping powers, making him able to manipulate the Astral Plane at will, and manifest himself, and move objects, in the physical world, miles from his actual body. He has spent the last 20 years on the astral plane. Oliver's body was later taken over by Amahl Farouk who used him to do things like use Amy Haller's body to revive Lenny and then used him to locate where his human body is. Oliver is defeated by David. In the third season, Oliver and Melanie are shown in the Astral Plane where they get Syd's lost mind back to its current age while contending with Wolf.

Hawley announced in October 2016 that Jemaine Clement would be joining the series in what was described as "a multi-episode arc", later revealed to be portraying Melanie's husband Oliver. With the end of the first season establishing the importance of Oliver Bird, now the host of the villainous Shadow King, Hawley said that he had talked to Clement about the next season, and that he was "excited to come back". Clement was promoted to a series regular for the second season.

=== Clark Debussy ===
Clark Debussy (portrayed by Hamish Linklater) is an interrogator for Division 3. During an attempt to interrogate David Haller, he is badly injured in an accident caused by him which scarred his face and gave him a limp where he has to walk with a walking stick. In light of the Shadow King's threat, Melanie persuades Clark to contact his superiors to call a truce between Summerland and Division 3. In Season 3, Clark participates in the hunt for David. When David and his cult raid the airship to rescue Switch, Clark and the security personnel are teleported into space where his body freezes.

After appearing as a guest in the first season, Linklater was promoted to a series regular for the second season.

=== Jia-Yi / Switch ===
Jia-Yi "Switch" (portrayed by Lauren Tsai) is a young mutant with time-traveling abilities. The side effect of using this power causes a tooth of hers to fall out. Switch is drawn to David Haller's cult where he uses her for a time-traveling mission to keep Shadow King from ruining his life. Throughout the season, David uses her to continuously travel back and communicate with his mother, only to directly cause her reason for leaving him. She progressively becomes weaker and accepts her death, only for her father (also a time traveler) to come help her embrace the position of a time deity. Switch proceeds to set everything right before leaving with her father to another plane of existence.

== Recurring characters ==
=== Introduced in season one ===
==== Brubaker ====
Brubaker (portrayed by David Selby) is a member of Division 3 who answers to Admiral Fukyama. He is killed when David traps him in the floor.

==== Philly ====
Philly (portrayed by Ellie Araiza) was David's "perky and aloof" ex-girlfriend, until she left him after he lost control of his abilities.

==== Rudy ====
Rudy (portrayed by Brad Mann) is a telekinetic mutant who is a member of Melanie Bird's Summerland crew. In Episode 7, he is the drooling man in Clockworks Psychiatric Hospital. Rudy was later discovered to have been killed by Eye.

==== The Eye ====
Walter (portrayed by Mackenzie Gray) is a mutant and one of the founders of Summerland, who now works as an agent of Government Division 3 under the name "The Eye". He has the power to manifest himself as other people in voice and appearance. Walter is later killed by the Shadow King.

==== Henry Poole ====
Henry Poole (portrayed by Scott Lawrence) was David's psychiatrist before he was admitted to Clockworks.

=== Introduced in season two ===
==== The Narrator ====
The Narrator (voiced by Jon Hamm) narrates several "educational segments" throughout the second season in between each episode's plot.

Hawley created the segments as a way to help explore thematic ideas such as "our shared reality being a choice that we make. Sometimes societies go a little bit crazy. How does that happen?" The segments "take these concepts of mental illness, and [visualize] them in a way where you can tell a story." Hawley did not want the narration to feel "tainted" by having one of the series' characters give their own point of view, and wanted an actor who could give "a sense of identity and a feeling of control [as if] the show itself has a point of view and it's all going somewhere". He compared the voice that he wanted for the narration to Alec Baldwin's from the film The Royal Tenenbaums, and considered Hamm—who he thought had "a great voice"—after working with him on the film Pale Blue Dot. Hamm agreed to take on the role, and Hawley thought he gave the segments "such character", comparing the final performance to Rod Serling. Hawley added that he was "pretty confident" the actor would only be providing his voice to the series rather than ever appearing onscreen.

== Guest characters ==
=== Introduced in season one ===
- Dennis Kissinger (portrayed by David Ferry): David's psychiatrist at Clockworks Psychiatric Hospital.
- Ben (portrayed by Matt Hamilton in season one, Ryan Caldwell in season two): Amy's partner. He is later killed by Oliver Bird at the time when he was possessed by Shadow King.
- David's adoptive mother (portrayed by Tatyana Forrest).
- David's adoptive father (portrayed by Dario Giordani): An astronomer.
- Benny (portrayed by Kirby Morrow): David's friend before he was admitted to Clockworks. He is replaced by Lenny in many of David's memories.
- The Greek (portrayed by Eddie Jemison): A criminal David and Lenny previously sold contraband to.
- Ptonomy's mother (portrayed by Sharlene Royer): The unnamed mother of Ptonomy.
- Daniel Bohr-Debussy (portrayed by Keir O'Donnell): Clark's husband who also works for Division 3. In Season 3, David manipulates Daniel's memory to get the answer on where Switch is being held. When the Division 3 transport arrives at headquarters, an amnesiac Daniel asks the guards who he is.

=== Introduced in season two ===
- Admiral Fukyama (portrayed by Marc Oka): The leader of Division 3 who wears a straw bascinet over his head similar to the Komusō. He speaks through the robot-like Vermillion.
- Zhuang Zhou (portrayed by Michael Yama): An ancient Chinese philosopher.
- Joan Barrett (portrayed by Lily Rabe): Syd's mother.
- Lenore / Gran-Gran (portrayed by Jo Farkas): Lenny's alcoholic grandmother.
- Laura Mercer (portrayed by Molly Hagan): A businesswoman in one of David's realities.
- Don Eichman (portrayed by Seamus Dever):

The robot-like Vermillion who appear as women with mustaches are portrayed by Jenna Borrenpohl, Jelly Howie, Ashli Dowling, Caitlin Leahy, Brittney Parker Rose, and Lexa Gluck. Rachele Schank, Marikah Cunningham, and Tiffany Feese portray the Vermillion that appear in Season Three.

=== Introduced in season three ===
- Salmon (portrayed by Vanessa Dubasso): A woman who directs Switch to David Haller. She is the lover of Lenny. When it came to the Time Eaters' attack, Lenny was made to experience the labour and unseen death of Salmon.
- Professor X / Charles Xavier (portrayed by Harry Lloyd): The father of David Haller. In October 2016, Hawley said that David's comic book father Charles Xavier, who is portrayed in the X-Men films by Patrick Stewart and James McAvoy at different ages, would "probably" be appearing in the series. In January 2017, producer Lauren Shuler Donner said that the series would definitely "touch on" David's connection to Xavier, but that neither Stewart nor McAvoy would be portraying the character in the series. Hawley clarified that there were no plans for the character to appear in the first season, and that the reason a film actor was unlikely to reprise the role in the series at some point was, "You'd have to pay those guys so much money ... movie money in a different medium." In March, Stewart expressed interest in reprising the role for the series, despite feeling that his role in the X-Men film Logan was "a perfect farewell" to the character. For the onscreen confirmation that Xavier is David's father in "Chapter 7", with Xavier's signature wheelchair shown in a brief flashback, the series' production was able to choose from any of the variant wheelchairs used throughout the film series. They settled on the version from X-Men: Apocalypse, with the prop used in that film being brought out of storage for the show. Discussing a potential appearance by the character in the series' second season, Hawley said, "any person who learns they were adopted is going to have his questions and want to speak out to those parents, to his birth parents, I think that's a very natural story ... that's definitely something that we're going to approach." He added that this would be both a creative and corporate decision, in terms of the "movie studio and their relationship to the X-Men, and characters they want in the movies and want to protect. And were we to want to have Professor X on the show as Patrick Stewart or James McAvoy ... that's a conversation with the actor and the studio." Hawley indicated in July 2017 that he was interested in seeing a meeting where Haller is older than Xavier, which Stevens compared to Back to the Future. With the premiere of the second season, Hawley said that there were issues with "corporate synergy" and "a lot of people with opinions and strategies for franchise development" that were preventing the character from appearing in the series, but "I think we'll be victorious in the end because our hearts are pure." He added that another question surrounding the potential appearance was where in the timeline the series is in relation to the version portrayed by Stewart and McAvoy, since the series does not acknowledge being set in a specific timeframe. On February 5, 2019, Harry Lloyd was revealed to be portraying the character in a guest role in the third season.
- Gabrielle Xavier (portrayed by Stephanie Corneliussen): A Romani Holocaust survivor, the wife of Charles Xavier and mother of David Haller. She was originally in a catatonic state at a mental hospital following World War II until Charles used his telepathy to bring her out of it.
- Wolf / Jerome (portrayed by Jason Mantzoukas): An entity of the Astral Plane who corrupts those that he finds in the Astral Plane.
- Cynthia (portrayed by Samantha Cormeier): A girl that is found by Wolf.
- Xiu (portrayed by Ben Wang): The father of Switch
