= Ellie Kemper =

American actress and comedian (born 1980)

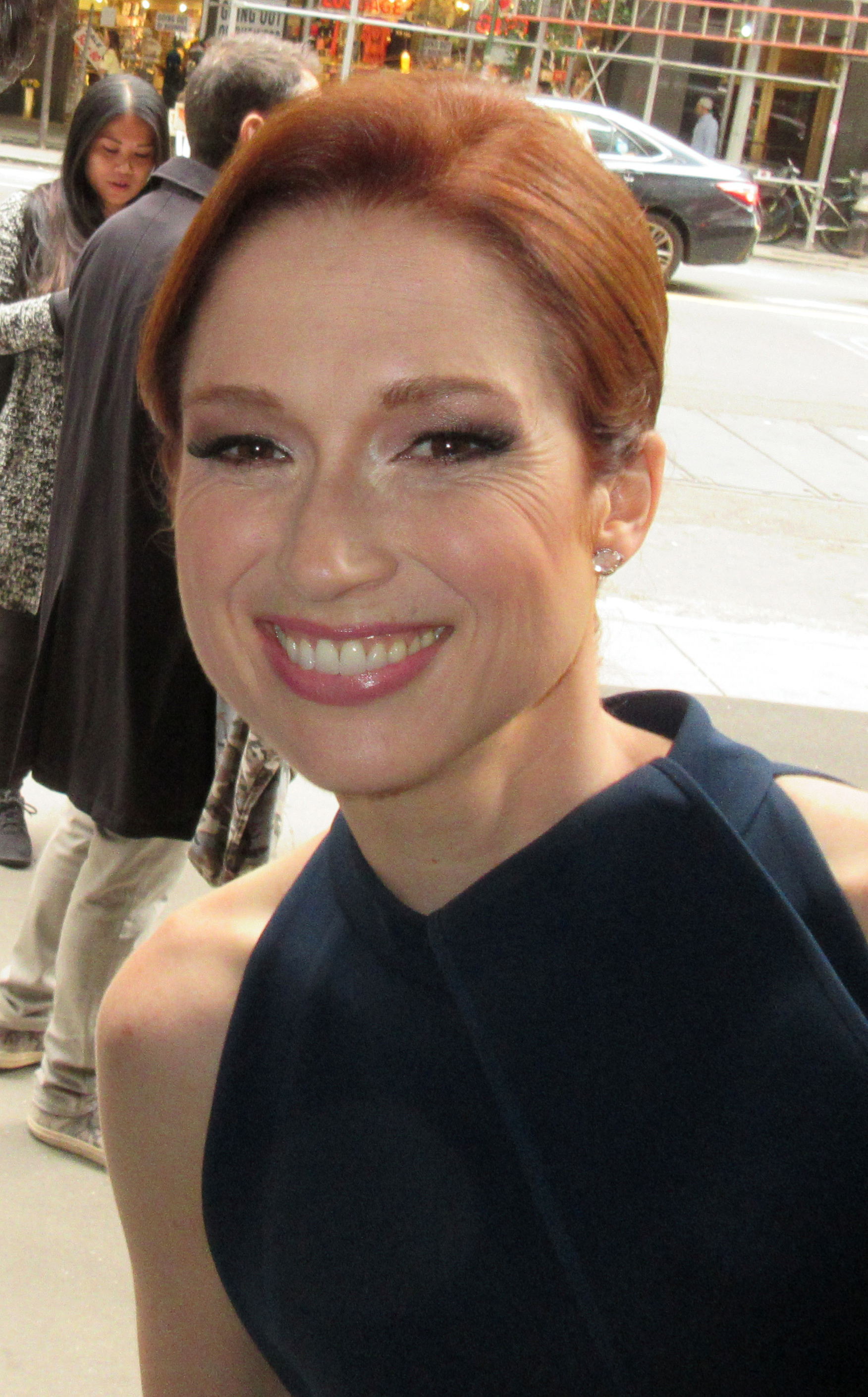
- Kemper in 2018
- Born: Elizabeth Claire Kemper; May 2, 1980 (age 46); Kansas City, Missouri, U.S.
- Education: Princeton University (BA)
- Occupations: Actress; comedian; writer
- Years active: 1999–present
- Spouse: Michael Koman (m. 2012)
- Children: 2
- Relatives: Carrie Kemper (sister)

Elizabeth Claire Kemper (born May 2, 1980) is an American actress and comedian, best known for her roles of Erin Hannon in the sitcom The Office (2009–2013) and Kimmy Schmidt in the sitcom Unbreakable Kimmy Schmidt (2015–2019). She has also appeared in films, notably Bridesmaids (2011), 21 Jump Street (2012), Sex Tape (2014), and Home Sweet Home Alone (2021). In 2018, she released her debut book, My Squirrel Days.

She earned two consecutive nominations for the Primetime Emmy Award for Outstanding Lead Actress in a Comedy Series, and has also been nominated for a Critics' Choice Movie Award, two Critics' Choice Television Awards, three Satellite Awards, and seven Screen Actors Guild Awards.

== Early life ==
Kemper was born on May 2, 1980, in Kansas City, Missouri. Her parents are Dorothy Ann "Dotty" (née Jannarone) and David Woods Kemper, a son of one of the wealthiest families in Missouri. She is the second of their four children.

She is the elder sister of television writer Carrie Kemper. Kemper's ancestry is Italian (from her maternal grandfather), English, French, and German. She was raised and remains a practicing Roman Catholic.

In 1999, at age 19, she was presented as a debutante at the Veiled Prophet Ball, and was named the Veiled Prophet's Queen of Love and Beauty. Her participation sparked controversy in 2021 due to the Ball's background, which was described as "racist and elitist". The backlash prompted Kemper to release a statement denouncing white supremacy and apologizing for participating in the event.

=== Education ===
Kemper's family moved to St. Louis when she was five. She attended Conway Elementary School in the affluent suburb of Ladue and high school at John Burroughs School, where she developed an interest in theater and improvisational comedy. One of her teachers was actor Jon Hamm, with whom she appeared in a school play.

Kemper graduated from Princeton University in 2002 with a Bachelor of Arts in English. At Princeton, she was a member of the improv comedy troupe Quipfire, which was known for its elaborate pranks. She was also a member of the Ivy Club.

As a freshman, she played on Princeton's 1998 national championship field hockey team, maintaining she sat on the bench "roughly 97 percent" of the time, before moving on the following year to focus on theater. She attended Worcester College, Oxford, for a year, where she studied towards a master's degree in English literature.

== Career ==
=== Early comedic career ===
I'm the most comfortable when I'm playing a naturalistic character. I auditioned for Saturday Night Live, and when I was doing the biggest characters, I felt the least comfortable. I'm just more comfortable when it's some version of myself.

— Ellie Kemper

Kemper continued her interest in improvisational comedy at Princeton. She participated in Quipfire!, Princeton's oldest improv comedy group, and the Princeton Triangle Club, a touring musical comedy theater troupe. She also appeared in a radio spot for Dunkin' Donuts.

Kemper earned her Screen Actors Guild card doing commercial advertising for a one-week sale of tents at Kmart. It featured her camping with an onscreen husband, and a shot where a tarantula crawled across her face. She regularly appeared in comedy sketches on Late Night with Conan O'Brien in the late 2000s, and made guest appearances on Important Things with Demetri Martin, and E! Television's The Gastineau Girls, which has been described as her "breakout role". Though the series was reality TV, her role was scripted. She has appeared on Fuse TV's The P.A. In October 2008, she appeared on The Colbert Report in a PSA for Teen Voter Abstinence. She has written several sketch comedy shows, many with her comedy partner Scott Eckert, a fellow Princeton grad. She is a contributing writer for the national satirical newspaper The Onion, and for McSweeney's. She is also a contributor to HuffPost.

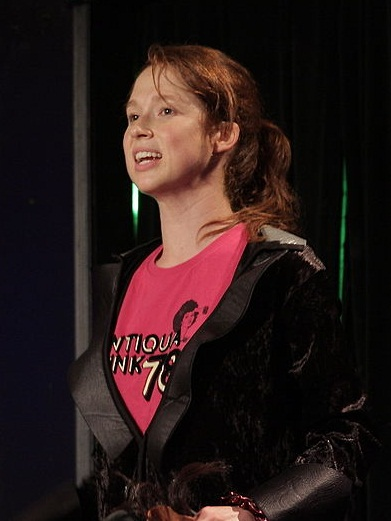
Kemper performing "Feeling Sad/Mad with Ellie Kemper" at the Upright Citizens Brigade Theater in 2008

Upon moving to New York City, Kemper participated in the People's Improv Theater and the city troupe of Upright Citizens Brigade, an improvisational comedy and sketch comedy theater. She has appeared in several shows for the Brigade, including Death and/or Despair, Listen Kid, Gang Bang and The Improvised Mystery. At the UCB, she performed with the house improv teams Mailer Daemon and fwand. At the People's Improv Theater she performs with the house improv team Big Black Car. In August 2008, she auditioned for a spot on the NBC sketch comedy show Saturday Night Live, but was not cast. In July 2009, Kemper was named one of Variety magazine's "10 Comics To Watch".

Being on set with them is like being in a dream, except the dream is real and I can reach out and touch them. Except I am trying not to touch them too much, because I was raised right.

— Ellie Kemper on The Office

In 2007, she appeared in How to Kick People, a performance combining comedy and literary performances. In March 2008, she wrote and performed in the one-woman show "Dumb Girls" through the Upright Citizens Brigade Theatre. She also performed in the one-woman show "Feeling Sad/Mad with Ellie Kemper" and has appeared in comedy sketches on Funny or Die, the comedy website started by Will Ferrell and Adam McKay's production company, Gary Sanchez Productions.

Kemper gained Internet interest in August 2007 for her part in "Blowjob Girl," a humor video on the sketch comedy site Derrick Comedy, in which she shows her enthusiasm for her hobby with rough hands and a lot of gnashing teeth. Kemper said of the video in an April 2010 interview with The A.V. Club: "I really don't like that video, and I wish that I hadn't done it, even though I know that it's a joke. I hate that it got sort of big, because I don't think that it's that funny and I don't want that to be the epitome of my work. It's just one video in a sea of many, but it has made me conscious of not wanting to do a video like that again." Kemper has also contributed an article to CollegeHumor entitled "Regarding Our Decision Never to See Me Again". She also had a minor role in the 2009 film Mystery Team. Kemper starred in a fake iPhone commercial on Late Night with Conan O'Brien in January 2007, six months before the first iPhone was released. Kemper appeared in the Sofia Coppola comedy-drama Somewhere in 2010. She appeared in Bridesmaids in 2011. On April 3, 2013, it was announced that Kemper would be voicing a character in an episode of the animated sitcom American Dad!

Kemper auditioned for a role in Parks and Recreation, an NBC comedy series started in 2009 by Michael Schur and Greg Daniels, creator of the series The Office. She was not cast in the role, but received a call back to audition for a supporting role in The Office as Erin Hannon, a secretary filling in for the regular secretary Pam Beesly when she briefly left the job at the end of the fifth season. Kemper was cast in the role, and started appearing in the show in April 2009. The character was originally written to be more sarcastic and dry, but the writers changed her to be more perky and optimistic to more closely resemble Kemper herself. Kemper described the character as "an exaggerated version of myself". Kemper described herself as a "huge fan" of the show and was thrilled to be on it. Although the character was originally intended for four episodes, the producers were impressed with Kemper and signed her as a regular in the sixth season. Jennifer Celotta, a screenwriter with the series, described Kemper as a "fun addition" to the show.

=== Television work ===
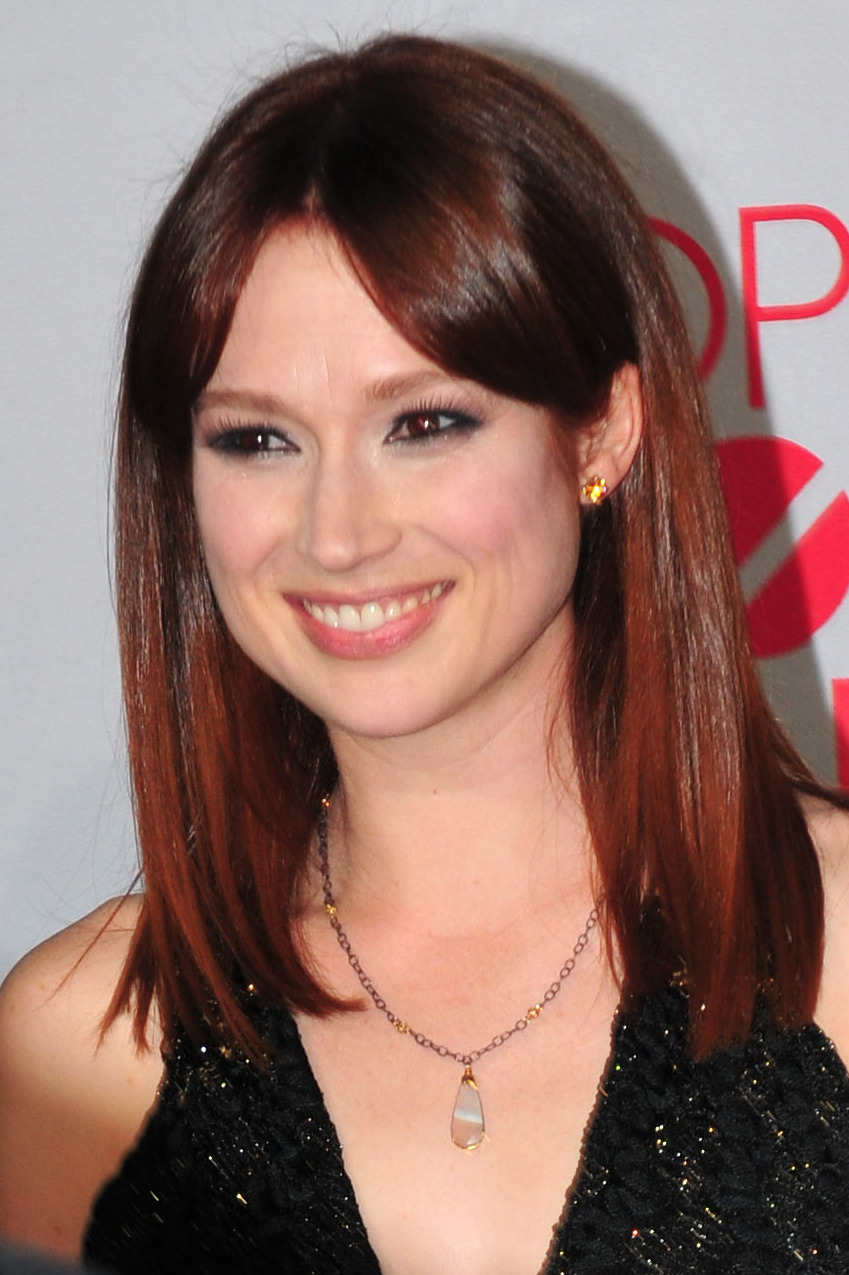
Kemper at the 38th People's Choice Awards in January 2012

Kemper received positive reviews for her role in The Office. Alan Sepinwall, television columnist with The Star-Ledger, praised the "infectious joy and sweetness" she brought to the show. Joshua Ostroff of Eye Weekly described Erin as one of the best new television characters of the 2008–2009 season and said, "Erin's high-grade adorability, up-for-anything attitude and sheer niceness is unlike anyone else in the office, adding a welcome new wrinkle for next season." Andy Shaw of TV Fodder said she "adds some freshness to the cast" and Josh McAuliffe of The Times-Tribune in Scranton, Pennsylvania, said he liked Erin's "cheerful, appealingly goofy personality". Many critics have singled her out as a highlight of the show's eighth season following Steve Carell's departure.

In October 2009, Kemper appeared in Subtle Sexuality, a set of three The Office webisodes about efforts by Erin and Kelly Kapoor (Mindy Kaling) to start a girl group.

Following The Office, she starred in the Netflix original comedy series Unbreakable Kimmy Schmidt as the fish-out-of-water title character. She plays a former abductee and forced cult member who wants to shed the victim pity of her small hometown and moves to New York. Her performance on the show has been widely acclaimed, and she received multiple nominations for the Screen Actors Guild Award and Primetime Emmy Award for Outstanding Lead Actress in a Comedy Series.

In summer 2015, Kemper served as a temporary co-host of Today alongside Al Roker, Natalie Morales, Tamron Hall, and Willie Geist.

In 2019, Kemper appeared as a guest judge on season 14 of America's Got Talent where she pushed the Golden Buzzer for light-up dance group Light Balance Kids.

=== Other work ===
In 2018, Kemper recorded for the audiobook A Day in the Life of Marlon Bundo. She also recorded the audiobook for 2019's The Legends of Greemulax, a novel attributed to her character Kimmy Schmidt.

That same year she published her first book, My Squirrel Days.

In 2023, she joined the cast of the Broadway play Peter Pan Goes Wrong making her Broadway debut as Francis for a limited engagement.

In 2025, she became a spokesperson for Kohl's Department Stores playing the role of "Kohl's Mom".

== Personal life ==
In 2012, Kemper became engaged to comedy writer Michael Koman. They married on July 7, 2012. They have two sons, born in August 2016 and September 2019. On The Late Show with Stephen Colbert, Kemper said that she remained a practicing Catholic and that her Jewish husband had told her priest that he agreed to raise their children Roman Catholic.

In 2022, Kemper ran the NYC Marathon, finishing in 5:17:39.

== Filmography ==
=== Film ===
Year	Title	Role	Notes
2009	Mystery Team	Jamie	
2009	Cayman Went	Girl in Bar	
2010	Get Him to the Greek	Pinnacle Executive	
2010	Somewhere	Claire	
2011	Bridesmaids	Becca	
2012	21 Jump Street	Ms. Griggs	
2012	Rich Girl Problems	Lucretia	Short film
2013	Identity Thief	Flo	Uncredited
2014	Laggies	Allison	
2014	Sex Tape	Tess	
2014	They Came Together	Karen	
2014	The Nobodies	Julie	Short film
2016	The Secret Life of Pets	Katie	Voice
2017	The Lego Batman Movie	Phyllis	Voice
2017	Smurfs: The Lost Village	Smurf Blossom	Voice
2019	The Secret Life of Pets 2	Katie	Voice
2020	We Bare Bears: The Movie	Produce Lucy	Voice
2020	The Stand In	Jenna Jones	
2021	Home Sweet Home Alone	Pam McKenzie	
2023	Happiness for Beginners	Helen	

=== Television ===
Year	Title	Role	Notes
1999	Neutrino	Various	
2006	Sexual Intercourse: American Style	Cindy	
2007	Redeeming Rainbow	Shelly	Television film
2007–2008	Mister Glasses	Kitty	5 episodes
2009–2010	Important Things with Demetri Martin	Allison / Felicia	2 episodes
2009–2013	The Office	Erin Hannon	Recurring: Season 5 Main role: Seasons 6–9 (107 episodes)
2010	The Office: The 3rd Floor	Erin Hannon	3 episodes
2012	NTSF:SD:SUV::	Fitzpatrick	Episode: "Whack-a-Mole"
2012	Robot Chicken	Bella Swan / Tracy / Female Passenger	Voice, episode: "Crushed by a Steamroller on My 53rd Birthday"
2012–2013	The Mindy Project	Heather	3 episodes
2013	Brenda Forever	Brenda Miller	Unaired TV pilot
2013–2014	Hollywood Game Night	Herself	2 episodes
2013–2018	Sofia the First	Crackle	Voice; 10 episodes
2014	The Ellen DeGeneres Show	Herself (fill-in host)	Episode: "11.96"
2014	American Dad!	Jenna	Voice, episode: "Introducing the Naughty Stewardesses"
2014	Comedy Bang! Bang!	Herself	Episode: "Ellie Kemper Wears a Purple Ruffled Sleeveless Top & Lavender Flats"
2014	TripTank	Homeless Lady, Hula Girl	Voice, 2 episodes
2015	The Today Show	Herself (co-anchor, Today's Take)	Morning news program (June 29, 2015 – July 17, 2015)
2015	WordGirl	Rose Franklin	Voice, episode: "News Girl"
2015	Drunk History	Nellie Bly	Episode: "Journalism"
2015–2018	We Bare Bears	Produce Lucy	Voice, 4 episodes
2015–2020	Unbreakable Kimmy Schmidt	Kimmy Schmidt	Main role (52 episodes)
2016	Animals.	Princess	Voice, episode: "Dogs."
2016	All Hail King Julien	Karen	Voice, episode: "Revenge of the Prom"
2017	Julie's Greenroom	Herself	2 episodes
2018	The Who Was? Show	Herself (narrator for Amelia)	Episode: "Isaac Newton & Amelia Earhart"
2019	At Home with Amy Sedaris	Herself	Episode: "Anniversary"
2019	Live in Front of a Studio Audience	Gloria Stivic	Episode: "Norman Lear's All in the Family and The Jeffersons"
2019	America's Got Talent	Herself (Guest Judge)	Season 14
2019	You're Not a Monster	Elsa Brenner	Voice, 3 episodes
2020	The Simpsons	Mary	Voice, episode: "A Springfield Summer Christmas for Christmas"
2022	Central Park	Ingrid Witherstrop	Voice, episode: "Where There's Smoke"
2022	Inside Amy Schumer	Noelle Christensen	Episode: "Gratitude"
2022–2023	Eureka!	Chee	Voice, 4 episodes
2022–2023	The Great American Baking Show	Herself (host)	7 episodes
2026	The Elephant & Piggie Show!	Piggie	Voice

== Bibliography ==
- Kemper, Ellie (2018). My Squirrel Days. Scribner. ISBN 978-1-5011-6334-0.

== Awards and nominations ==
Year	Association	Category	Nominated work	Result
2010	Golden Nymph Awards	Outstanding Actress – Comedy Series	The Office	Won
2010	Screen Actors Guild Award	Outstanding Performance by an Ensemble in a Comedy Series	The Office	Nominated
2011	Screen Actors Guild Award	Outstanding Performance by an Ensemble in a Comedy Series	The Office	Nominated
2012	Screen Actors Guild Award	Outstanding Performance by an Ensemble in a Comedy Series	The Office	Nominated
2012	Alliance of Women Film Journalists	Best Ensemble Cast	Bridesmaids	Won
2012	Critics' Choice Movie Awards	Best Acting Ensemble	Bridesmaids	Nominated
2012	MTV Movie Awards	Best Jaw Dropping Moment	Bridesmaids	Won
2012	MTV Movie Awards	Best Cast	Bridesmaids	Nominated
2012	New York Film Critics Online	Best Ensemble	Bridesmaids	Won
2012	Screen Actors Guild Award	Outstanding Performance by a Cast in a Motion Picture	Bridesmaids	Nominated
2012	Washington D.C. Area Film Critics Association	Best Ensemble	Bridesmaids	Won
2013	Screen Actors Guild Award	Outstanding Performance by an Ensemble in a Comedy Series	The Office	Nominated
2015	Webby Awards	Best Actress	Unbreakable Kimmy Schmidt	Won
2015	Screen Actors Guild Award	Outstanding Performance by a Female Actor in a Comedy Series	Unbreakable Kimmy Schmidt	Nominated
2016	Primetime Emmy Awards	Outstanding Lead Actress in a Comedy Series	Unbreakable Kimmy Schmidt	Nominated
2016	Screen Actors Guild Award	Outstanding Performance by a Female Actor in a Comedy Series	Unbreakable Kimmy Schmidt	Nominated
2017	Primetime Emmy Awards	Outstanding Lead Actress in a Comedy Series	Unbreakable Kimmy Schmidt	Nominated
