= Aubrey Plaza =

American actress and producer (born 1984)

- Plaza in 2026
- Born: Aubrey Christina Plaza; June 26, 1984 (age 42); Wilmington, Delaware, U.S.
- Education: New York University (BFA)
- Occupations: Actress; comedian; producer
- Years active: 2004–present
- Works: Full list
- Spouse: Jeff Baena (m. 2021; sep. 2024)
- Partner: Christopher Abbott (2025–present)
- Children: 1

Aubrey Christina Plaza (born June 26, 1984) is an American actress, comedian, and producer. She began her career performing improv and sketch comedy at the Upright Citizens Brigade Theatre. After graduating from New York University Tisch School of the Arts, she gained recognition for her role as April Ludgate on the NBC sitcom Parks and Recreation (2009–2015). She then starred in the FX series Legion (2017–2019) and earned nominations for a Primetime Emmy Award and a Golden Globe Award for her starring role in the second season of the HBO series The White Lotus (2022).

Plaza made her film debut in Mystery Team (2009) and had her first leading film role in Safety Not Guaranteed (2012). She starred in the dark comedy films The Little Hours (2017) and Ingrid Goes West (2017), and the drama films Black Bear (2020) and Emily the Criminal (2022), all of which she also produced.

== Early life and education ==
Aubrey Christina Plaza was born on June 26, 1984, in Wilmington, Delaware. She has two younger sisters. Her parents, Bernadette and David Plaza, were aged 19 and 20 respectively at the time of her birth. Plaza said she was inspired by their work ethic, as they worked various jobs and attended night school while she was growing up; her mother eventually became an attorney and her father became a financial advisor. (Note: Attributed to multiple references:) Plaza's paternal family is Puerto Rican. Her paternal grandfather was born in Arecibo and moved to the mainland United States when he was 17 years old. She also has Taíno and Basque heritage. Her mother, who was adopted, is of Irish descent. (Note: Attributed to multiple references:)

Plaza described herself as a shy child until middle school, when she began performing in community theater. (Note: Attributed to multiple references:) Plaza said her upbringing was "very Catholic", (Note: Attributed to multiple references:) and she attended Ursuline Academy, an all-girls Catholic school. As a teenager, she was student-council president of her school, performed in theatrical productions with the Wilmington Drama League and the Delaware Theatre Company, and made short films as a hobby. Inspired by her "hero" Amy Poehler, Plaza took improv classes in both New York and Philadelphia; she also attended a New York Film Academy summer camp for filmmaking. (Note: Attributed to multiple references:)

During her time working at a local video store, Plaza became enamored with independent films, and discovered filmmakers that inspired her, such as John Waters and Christopher Guest. Waters' satirical film Serial Mom (1994) made a significant impact on her, and she connected with Waters' comedic sensibility. At age 16, she represented Ursuline at a Delaware youth leadership conference convened by Joe Biden. After graduating from Ursuline, Plaza studied film and television production at the New York University Tisch School of the Arts.

== Career ==
=== 2004–2009: Career beginnings ===
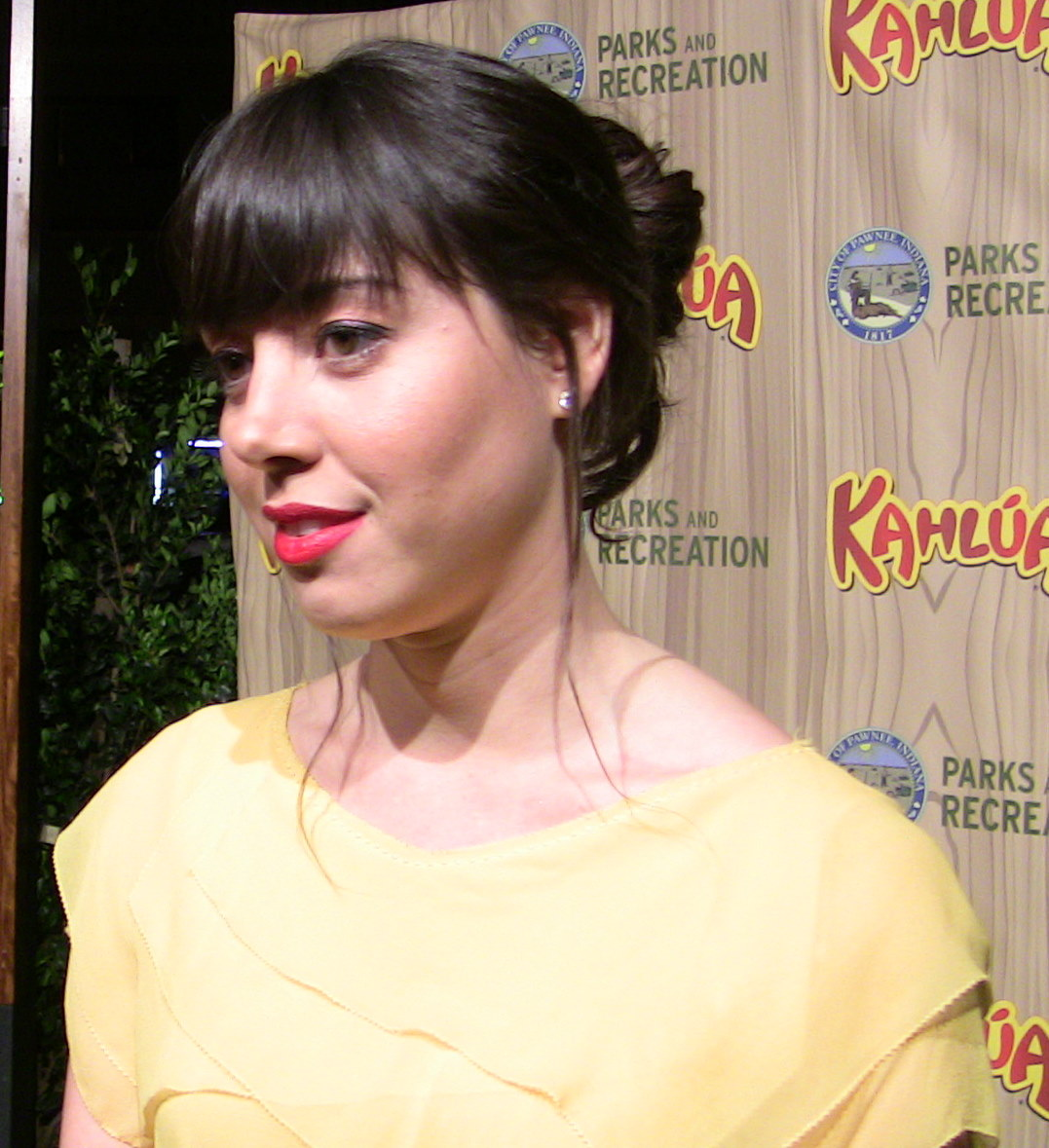
Plaza at the Parks and Recreation premiere party in 2009

Plaza trained and performed improv and sketch comedy at the Upright Citizens Brigade Theatre starting in 2004. She described her work there as "an art form that is so fucking hard, and just so fun when you get it right." She also performed at the Laugh Factory and The Improv. She had an internship at Saturday Night Live for its 2004–2005 season, and then became an NBC page. During this apprenticeship, she appeared in a 2006 episode of the sitcom 30 Rock. Though being a page at 30 Rockefeller Plaza was a lower position than her SNL internship, it is a "legendary" and highly selective program. She was also in two short films in 2006, Killswitch and In Love. In 2008, she was part of an Improv Everywhere sketch where she and others took an entire desktop computer and monitor to a Starbucks in New York City. Plaza had a recurring role in Maggie Carey's web series The Jeannie Tate Show, played the role of Robin Gibney in ESPN's Mayne Street (2008), and appeared in the first episode of "Terrible Decisions with Ben Schwartz" on Funny or Die.

In 2009, she made her feature film debut in Derrick Comedy's Mystery Team. She then played a standup comic and Seth Rogen's love interest in the black comedy-drama film Funny People, directed by Judd Apatow. As she did not have experience performing standup, she signed up for open mic nights at comedy clubs and bars in New York City to prepare for the role. For her audition tape, she performed and recorded five minutes of standup comedy at her friend Donald Glover's standup show. When Plaza flew to Los Angeles for Funny People, the film's casting director Allison Jones asked her if she wanted to attend other meetings while she was in the city. Jones set up a meeting with Greg Daniels and Michael Schur, who were developing Parks and Recreation. At the meeting, they told her the idea for the show's pilot and that they were considering giving Amy Poehler's character an assistant who was a doltish blonde. Plaza pitched them instead the character of a smart intern who is at the department only for college credit and does not care about the job, which Plaza thought would be an interesting, comedic contrast with Poehler's character. They liked the concept for the character and created April Ludgate. Plaza, who said that in real life she was like Poehler's earnestly hard-working character, took inspiration from her younger sister for April's apathetic disposition. Plaza played the role from 2009 to 2015. She received praise for her performance, and April was considered one of the show's breakout characters.

=== 2010–2016: Rise in film and television ===
While Plaza was in Los Angeles for Funny People and Parks and Recreation, Allison Jones also recommended that she audition for Edgar Wright's romantic action comedy film Scott Pilgrim vs. the World (2010). Plaza was cast in the film, playing the supporting character Julie Powers. On March 12, 2010, Plaza performed at A Night of 140 Tweets: A Celebrity Tweetathon for Haiti, produced by Rob Huebel, Paul Scheer, Ben Stiller, and Mike Rosenstein, at the Upright Citizens Brigade Theatre in Los Angeles. In the breaks between filming Parks and Recreation seasons, Plaza appeared in other projects, films and television series. She appeared in a CollegeHumor short alongside Jason Bateman and Will Arnett. In 2011, she had a recurring role in the sketch comedy series Portlandia, and guest starred as "The Princess" in the comedic sci-fi web series Troopers on CollegeHumor. She also appeared in the comedy-drama film Damsels in Distress (2011) and the romantic comedy 10 Years (2011).

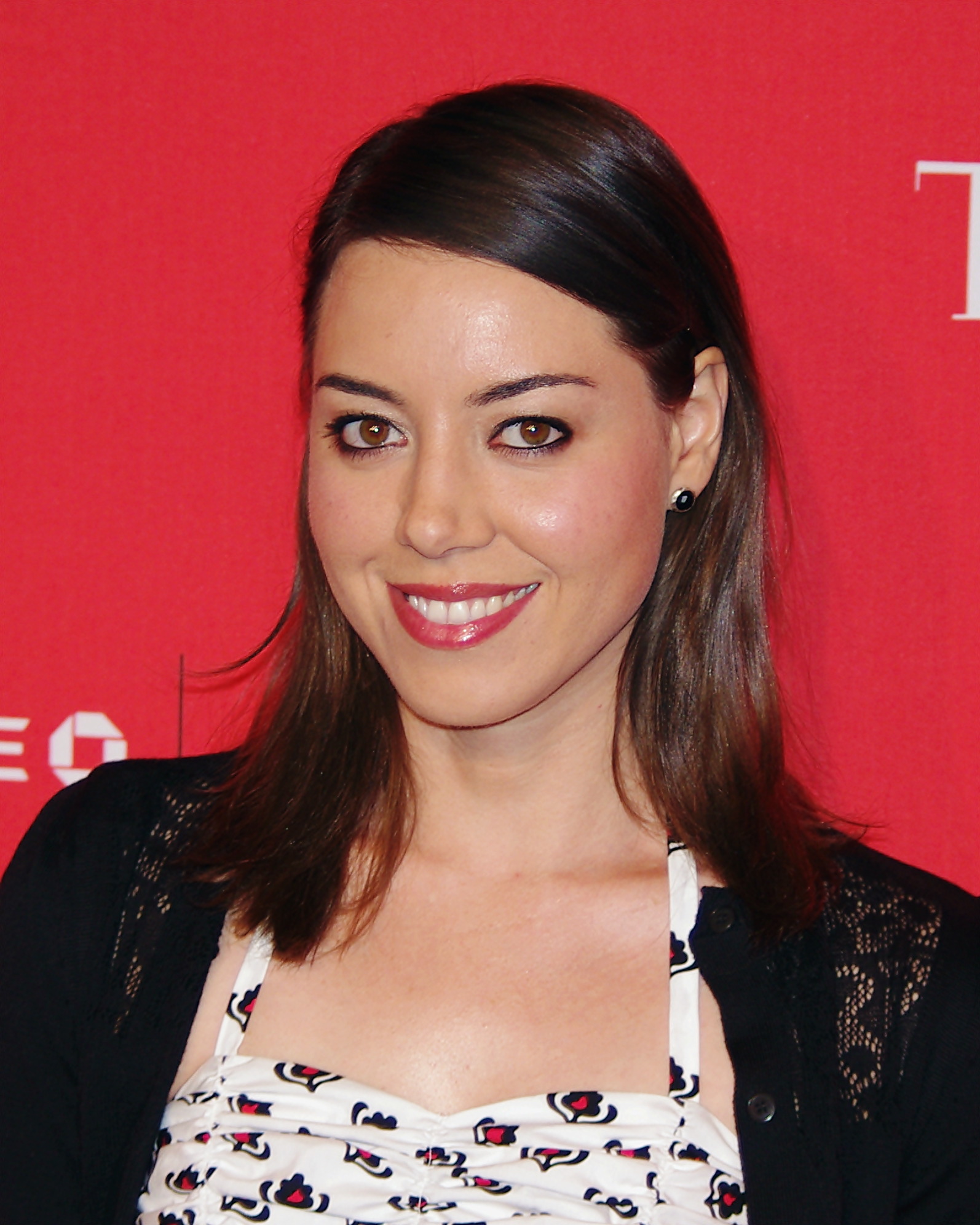
Plaza at the Time 100 gala in 2012

In 2012, Plaza had her first starring role in a major film in the comedy Safety Not Guaranteed, playing a magazine intern who answers a curious want ad. Her performance received positive reviews, and she won the award for Breakthrough Performance (Female) at the 2012 Young Hollywood Awards. In 2013, she portrayed the character Sacagawea in the Drunk History episode "Nashville" during a segment on Lewis and Clark's expedition. In 2013, she also had the starring role in the CBS Film The To Do List. In an impromptu attempt to promote the film, Plaza ran onto the stage at the 2013 MTV Movie Awards and grabbed Will Ferrell's award for Comedic Genius, inspired by Kanye West's interruption of Taylor Swift at the 2009 MTV Video Music Awards, with a drink in hand while the film's name was written across her chest. She was ejected from the studio lot where the ceremony was held.

Plaza voiced Eska in the animated fantasy action television series The Legend of Korra (2013–2014). She also voiced Grumpy Cat in the Lifetime Network's television film Grumpy Cat's Worst Christmas Ever (2014). Plaza starred in the 2014 horror comedy film Life After Beth about a young woman who returns from the dead, written and directed by Jeff Baena, and in Hal Hartley's drama film Ned Rifle (2014).

In 2016, Plaza starred in Mike and Dave Need Wedding Dates alongside Zac Efron, Anna Kendrick, and Adam DeVine. Her role as the rebellious Tatiana earned her critical praise. Then, she was a guest star on HarmonQuest, as a gnome named "Hawaiian Coffee" and portrayed Aaron Burr in the "Hamilton" episode of Drunk History. She also provided a guest voice for the SpongeBob SquarePants episode "Mall Girl Pearl" with Betty White. That same year, she portrayed Cat Adams, a contract killer, first in Season 11 of the CBS television series Criminal Minds, and then again in Season 12 and 15. Also in 2016 she played Lenore in Dirty Grandpa beside Zoey Deutch, Zac Efron and Robert De Niro.

=== 2017–2021: Career expansion ===
In 2017, Plaza starred in and produced the films The Little Hours and Ingrid Goes West. The former is a black comedy about medieval nuns loosely based on stories from The Decameron. Both films premiered at the Sundance Film Festival. In Ingrid Goes West, Plaza portrayed the social media obsessed fan of an influencer played by Elizabeth Olsen. Variety film critic Peter Debruge praised Plaza's performance writing: "Plaza's tortured performance captures all of this, which is saying something for an actress whose blasé persona hinges on the fact that she can't be bothered: Nobody plays ambivalence better, and yet, Plaza allows herself to seem vulnerable here." The film won the Independent Spirit Award for Best First Feature. The following year, she starred in the indie comedy An Evening with Beverly Luff Linn.

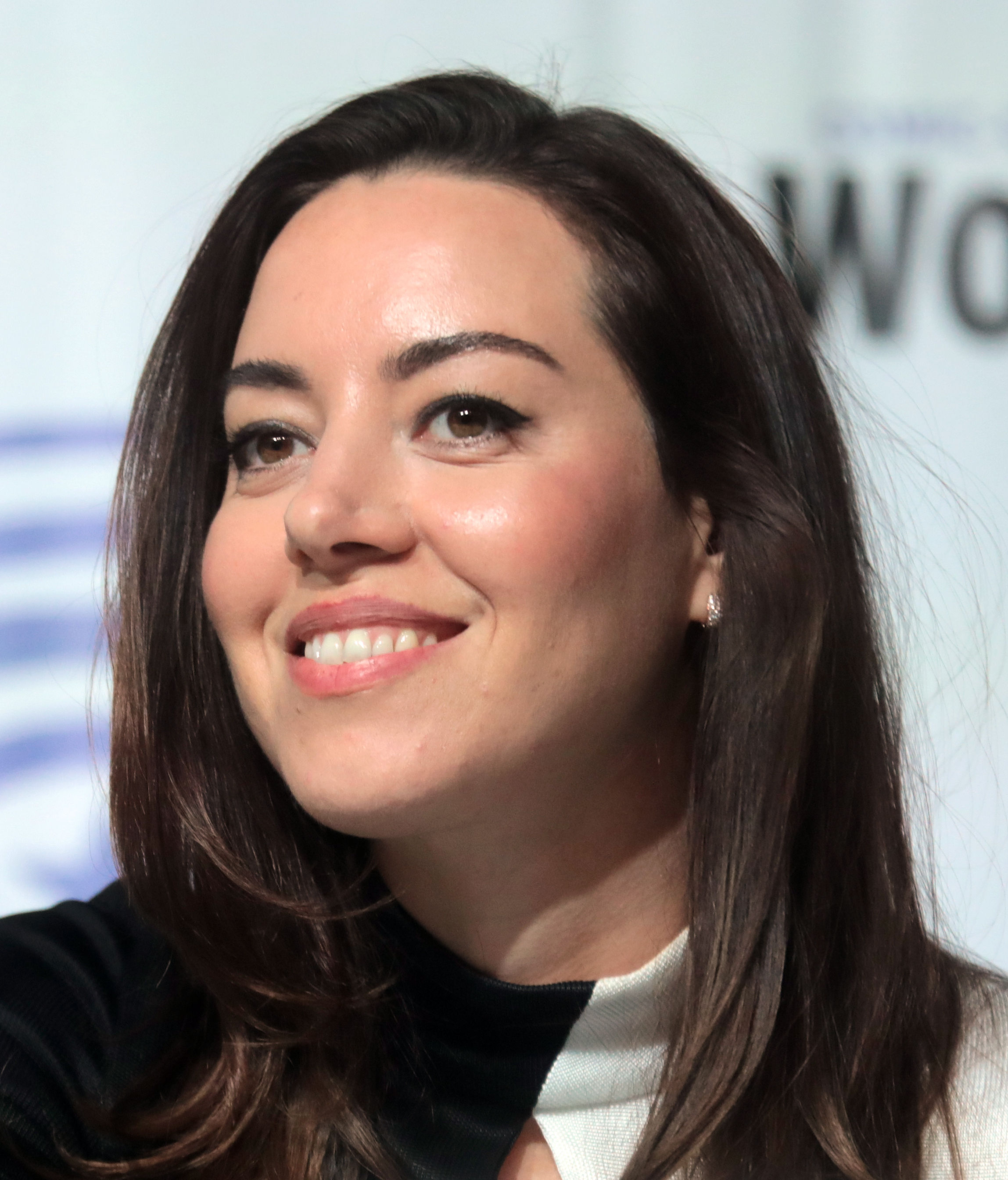
Plaza at WonderCon in 2019

From 2017 to 2019, Plaza portrayed both Amahl Farouk / Shadow King and Lenny Busker in the FX series Legion, which was critically praised along with Plaza's performance. The role of Lenny was originally written for a middle aged man. When Plaza was offered it, she requested that the character's dialogue and actions remain, as she did not want it "being tied down to anything gender-wise". David Bowie was an inspiration for her approach to the role. She was given creative freedom with the character and collaborated with directors and choreographers on sequences that were ambiguously described on the page. In 2019 and 2020, Plaza hosted the Independent Spirit Awards. In 2019, she starred in Child's Play, a reboot of the 1988 film, as Andy's mother who brings home a killer doll, Chucky.

In 2020, Plaza played Riley Johnson in the romantic comedy Happiest Season, and produced and starred in the independent experimental thriller Black Bear, garnering critical acclaim for her performance. Black Bear follows a filmmaker who retreats to a cabin in the mountains to find inspiration for her next film. NME wrote that the film "examin[es] the power dynamics in filmmaking", and Collider considered it an exploration of "human relationships, gender dynamics, and celebrity".

In 2021, Plaza wrote and made her directorial debut with the episode "Quiet Illness" of the Showtime anthology series Cinema Toast. Created by Jeff Baena, the series reinvents imagery from public domain films to tell different stories. In crafting "Quiet Illness", Plaza was inspired by actress Loretta Young's experiences and footage of her appearances. She edited various film and television clips starring Young into a psychological thriller about a woman's self-esteem, and cast Christina Ricci as a voice narrator. She described the project as "trippy" with a "pandemic-filming style". Plaza said that she has always had an interest in directing, and she had been writing a project during the COVID-19 pandemic.

=== 2022–present: Critical acclaim ===
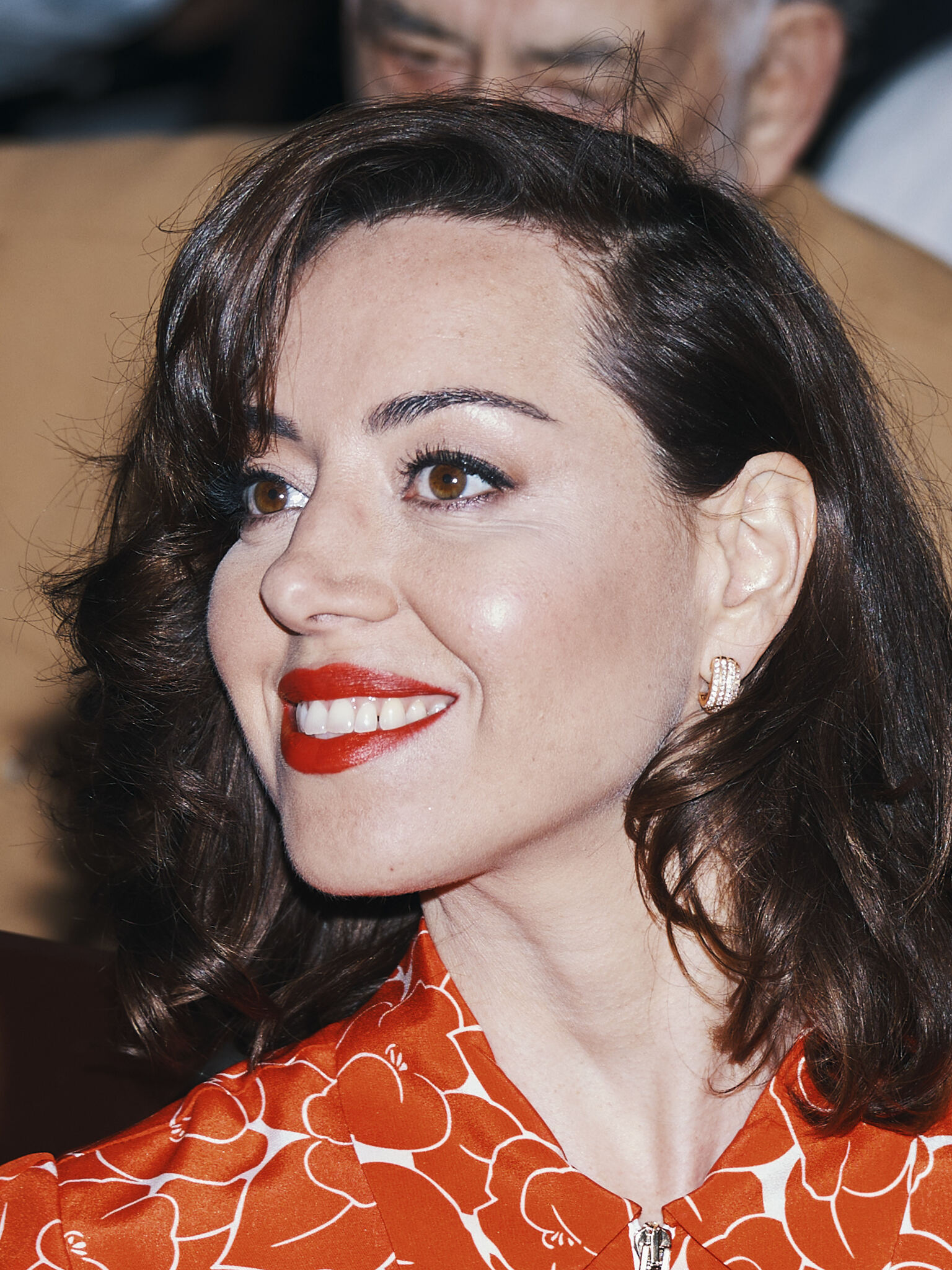
Plaza in 2024

Plaza produced and starred as the titular character in the independent film Emily the Criminal (2022), portraying a woman saddled with student debt and compelled into criminal activity. Her performance and the film received critical acclaim, with The New York Times calling it "wonderfully nuanced", Little White Lies writing that it is "perhaps Plaza’s best performance to date", and the Chicago Sun-Times deeming it "richly layered work" and "one of the best performances of the year in one of the best movies of the year". She also appeared in the film Spin Me Round, which premiered at the South by Southwest film festival in 2022. In the second season of the HBO anthology series The White Lotus, Plaza portrayed Harper, a lawyer vacationing in Sicily with her husband. For her performance in the series, she received an Emmy Award nomination for Outstanding Supporting Actress in a Drama Series and a Golden Globe Award nomination for Best Supporting Actress – Series, Miniseries or Television Film. In February 2022, Plaza contributed original poetry to Eating Salad Drunk, a comedian poetry anthology (edited by author Gabe Henry) that benefited Comedy Gives Back, a nonprofit supporting comedians facing financial hardship from the Covid-19 pandemic. On August 25, 2022, the adult animated sitcom Little Demon premiered on FXX, which features the voices of Plaza (who is also an executive producer), Danny DeVito, and Lucy DeVito. In October 2022, Plaza was given the Artist of Distinction Award at the Newport Beach Film Festival.

At the 2023 Independent Spirit Awards, Plaza received a nomination for Best Lead Performance for Emily the Criminal, as well as a nomination for Best First Feature as producer. In January 2023, she hosted Saturday Night Live for the first time and appeared in multiple sketches. In July, it was announced that she would be making her stage debut in an off-Broadway revival of John Patrick Shanley's Danny and the Deep Blue Sea, a two-hander about strangers who become lovers after meeting at a dive bar, opposite her Black Bear costar Christopher Abbott. She was nominated for the Drama League Distinguished Performance Award. Time magazine named Plaza one of the 100 most influential people in the world in 2023.

In 2024, Plaza and her Parks and Recreation costar Nick Offerman reunited in a Mountain Dew ad that aired during the Super Bowl LVIII broadcast. She was confirmed to be starring in John Waters's first film in over 20 years, Liarmouth, based on his novel of the same name. Plaza portrays the future self of Elliott Labrant in the comedy film My Old Ass (2024), and TV presenter Wow Platinum in Francis Ford Coppola's epic science fiction drama Megalopolis (2024). She portrayed Rio Vidal / Death in the Disney+ miniseries Agatha All Along, set in the Marvel Cinematic Universe (MCU), which premiered on September 18, 2024.

In August 2025, it was announced that Plaza would produce and star in the upcoming biopic The Heidi Fleiss Story, in which she will portray former Hollywood madam Heidi Fleiss. In April 2026, the adult animated series Kevin was released on Amazon Prime Video, which Plaza co-created, executive produced, and starred in, but in June 2026, Plaza announced Amazon Prime Video's decision to cancel Kevin after its first season. In May 2026, it was announced that she will star in the upcoming film Tomorrow Is a Drag, written and directed by Kenneth Lonergan.

== Personal life ==
At the age of 20, Plaza had a stroke which caused brief paralysis and temporary expressive aphasia, followed by a minor transient ischemic attack several years later. (Note: Attributed to multiple references:)

In high school, Plaza's first boyfriend was actor and musician John Gallagher Jr., whom she grew up doing community theater with. From 2009 to 2010, Plaza dated actor Michael Cera, after they met while filming Scott Pilgrim vs. the World.

In 2011, she began a relationship with writer and director Jeff Baena after meeting at a game night. They became collaborators, with Plaza starring in four of Baena's films. They married on their tenth anniversary in 2021. They separated in September 2024, and Plaza moved to New York but remained in frequent contact with Baena. On January 3, 2025, Baena died by suicide at his home in Los Angeles.

As of 2026, Plaza lives in New York with her partner, actor Christopher Abbott. They met on the set of the film Black Bear, then reunited in the off-Broadway play Danny and the Deep Blue Sea. Plaza gave birth to her and Abbott's daughter in July 2026.

== Acting credits ==
According to the review aggregator site Rotten Tomatoes, Plaza's most critically acclaimed films include Scott Pilgrim vs. the World (2010), Safety Not Guaranteed (2012), Ned Rifle (2014), Ingrid Goes West (2017), The Little Hours (2017), Black Bear (2020), Happiest Season (2020), Emily the Criminal (2022), and My Old Ass (2024).

Her most critically acclaimed television projects include Parks and Recreation (2009–2015), Legion (2017–2019), Calls (2021), Little Demon (2022), The White Lotus (2022), Scott Pilgrim Takes Off (2023) and Agatha All Along (2024).

== Awards and nominations ==
Award	Year	Work	Category	Result	Ref.
Actor Awards	2023	The White Lotus	Outstanding Performance by an Ensemble in a Drama Series (Note: Shared with the cast.)	Won	
ALMA Awards	2011	Parks and Recreation	Favorite TV Actress – Supporting Role	Nominated	
ALMA Awards	2012	Safety Not Guaranteed	Favorite Movie Actress – Comedy/Musical	Won	
ALMA Awards	2012	Parks and Recreation	Favorite TV Actress – Leading Role in Comedy	Nominated	
American Comedy Awards	2014	Parks and Recreation	Best Comedy Supporting Actress – TV	Nominated	
Astra Film Awards	2021	—	Acting Achievement	Won	
Astra TV Awards	2023	The White Lotus	Best Supporting Actress in a Broadcast Network or Cable Drama Series	Nominated	
Astra TV Awards	2023	Saturday Night Live	Best Guest Actress in a Comedy Series	Nominated	
Chlotrudis Awards	2013	Safety Not Guaranteed	Best Actress	Nominated	
Chlotrudis Awards	2018	Ingrid Goes West	Best Actress	Nominated	
Chlotrudis Awards	2021	Black Bear	Best Actress	Nominated	
Chlotrudis Awards	2018	The Little Hours	Best Performance by an Ensemble Cast	Nominated	
Dorian Awards	2023	The White Lotus	Best Supporting TV Performance – Drama	Nominated	
Drama League Awards	2024	Danny and the Deep Blue Sea	Distinguished Performance	Nominated	
Film Independent Spirit Awards	2018	Ingrid Goes West	Best First Feature (Note: As a producer.)	Won	
Film Independent Spirit Awards	2023	Emily the Criminal	Best Lead Performance	Nominated	
Film Independent Spirit Awards	2023	Emily the Criminal	Best First Feature	Nominated	
Golden Globes	2023	The White Lotus	Best Supporting Actress in a Limited Series, Anthology Series, or Motion Picture Made for Television	Nominated	
Golden Raspberry Awards	2017	Dirty Grandpa	Worst Supporting Actress	Nominated	
Golden Raspberry Awards	2025	Megalopolis	Worst Screen Combo (Note: Shared with "the entire cast of Megalopolis".)	Nominated	
Gotham Awards	2012	Safety Not Guaranteed	Best Ensemble Cast	Nominated	
Gotham Awards	2022	Emily the Criminal	Outstanding Lead Performance	Nominated	
Imagen Awards	2010	Parks and Recreation	Best Supporting Actress – Television	Nominated	
Imagen Awards	2012	Parks and Recreation	Best Supporting Actress – Television	Nominated	
Imagen Awards	2013	Parks and Recreation	Best Supporting Actress – Television	Nominated	
Imagen Awards	2014	Parks and Recreation	Best Supporting Actress – Television	Nominated	
Imagen Awards	2018	Legion	Best Actress – Television	Nominated	
Imagen Awards	2021	Black Bear	Best Actress – Feature Film	Won	
Imagen Awards	2023	The White Lotus	Best Supporting Actress – Television (Drama)	Won	
Imagen Awards	2025	My Old Ass	Best Supporting Actress – Feature Film	Nominated	
International Cinephile Society Awards	2025	Megalopolis	Best Supporting Actress	Nominated	
MTV Movie & TV Awards	2018	Legion	Best Villain	Nominated	
MTV Movie & TV Awards	2023	The White Lotus	Best Performance in a Show	Nominated	
Philadelphia Film Critics Circle Awards	2024	Megalopolis	Best Supporting Actress	Runner-up	
Primetime Emmy Awards	2024	The White Lotus	Outstanding Supporting Actress in a Drama Series	Nominated	
Queerties	2025	Agatha All Along	TV Performance	Won	
Riviera International Film Festival	2021	—	Icon Award	Won	
San Diego Film Critics Society Awards	2021	Black Bear	Best Actress	Nominated	
San Diego Film Critics Society Awards	2024	My Old Ass	Best Comedic Performance	Nominated	
San Francisco Bay Area Film Critics Circle Awards	2023	Emily the Criminal	Best Actress	Nominated	
Saturn Awards	2025	Agatha All Along	Best Guest Starring Role on Television	Nominated	
St. Louis Film Critics Association Awards	2012	Safety Not Guaranteed	Best Actress	Nominated	
Vancouver Film Critics Circle Awards	2025	My Old Ass	Best Supporting Actress in a Canadian Film	Nominated	
Young Hollywood Awards	2012	Safety Not Guaranteed	Breakthrough Performance – Female	Won	
Young Hollywood Awards	2014	—	Cuz You're Funny	Nominated	

== Discography ==
Year	Title	Album
2014	"Plot Song 1 (feat. Martha Plimpton)"	2276: A Levinson Bros & Rob Kutner Presentation
2014	"Plot Song 2"	2276: A Levinson Bros & Rob Kutner Presentation
2024	"The Ballad of The Witches' Road (Cover Version)"	Agatha All Along: Vol. 1 (Episodes 1-5) (Original Soundtrack)
2025	"Honey Don't (Cast Recording)"	Honey Don't (Original Motion Picture Soundtrack)

== Bibliography ==
With Dan Murphy:

- The Legend of the Christmas Witch (2021)
- The Return of the Christmas Witch (2022)
- Luna and the Witch Throw a Halloween Party (2025)
