= DC Pierson =

American comedian, actor, and author

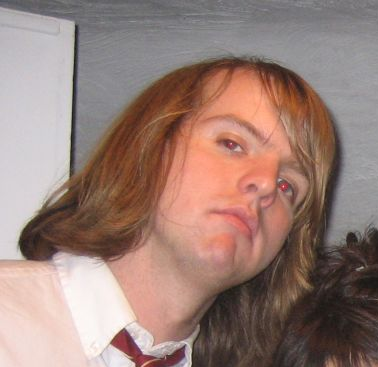
- Pierson in 2006
- Born: Phoenix, Arizona, U.S.
- Education: New York University (BA)
- Occupation(s): Actor, writer, comedian, rapper
- Years active: 2005–present

DC Pierson is an American comedian, author, and actor. He is best known for his involvement in the sketch and improvisational comedy group Derrick Comedy.

== Early life and education ==
Pierson was born in Phoenix, Arizona. He attended New York University, joining a sketch comedy group, Hammerkatz NYU, in the fall of 2003. He worked as both assistant director and director during his three-year tenure with the group. Pierson graduated from NYU's Dramatic Writing Department in 2007 with a degree in writing for television. He also made three brief appearances on NBC's Community, on which his Derrick Comedy co-star Donald Glover plays a main character, as a Greendale Gazette member.

== Career ==
=== Derrick Comedy ===
Pierson, along with other Hammerkatz alumni Donald Glover, Dominic Dierkes and Dan Eckman, formed the group Derrick Comedy after meeting at NYU. Pierson is both one of the principal actors and writers for Derrick Comedy.

Derrick Comedy has performed as an improvisational comedy group at the UCB Theatre in New York, but are best known for their sketches that appear on YouTube and CollegeHumor. Pierson has played roles including an emo teenager and a man making a plea to the Godfather. Pierson co-wrote Derrick Comedy's first feature-length film, Mystery Team, in which he also plays a self-described boy genius named Duncan.

=== Other works ===
On January 21, 2010, Pierson's first novel, The Boy Who Couldn't Sleep and Never Had To, was released on Random House. The story follows two high school students who are social outcasts. When one of the students, Eric, reveals that he never sleeps, the two boys end up on the run. His book came to a broad audience when he personally answered a high school student's questions regarding the work on Yahoo! Answers on August 13, 2012. On the page, the student asked for help in reviewing the book, a task that had been assigned to her by her teacher. She stated that lack of time, among other things, caused her to be unable to read the book. The author's reply to the student was first recognized by Techcrunch, and this coverage helped encourage more users to buy and read his book. One of Pierson's primary influences for his novel was the late J.D. Salinger. He is currently working on turning the book into a film, which will be directed by Dan Eckman. Pierson's second novel, Crap Kingdom, was released in 2013.

Childish Gambino is the rap moniker of his fellow Derrick Comedy member, Donald Glover. Pierson was featured on both of Childish Gambino's "I Am Just a Rapper" mixtapes, contributing verses to three different songs, "49ers (Orange Shirt)", "The Truth (Goth Star)", and "Different (Feel It All Around)". Pierson along with Nick Packard was also featured on Childish Gambino's "Assassins" from the 2008 mixtape Sick Boi. He was also featured along with Amber Petty on Donald Glover's "Starlight" from the 2009 mixtape Poindexter. He is also credited with the story told during "That Power" on Childish Gambino's Camp.

In 2014, Pierson had a brief cameo in Captain America: The Winter Soldier as Apple tech support Aaron Wilson. He reprised the character in 2021 in an advertisement series that doubled as a promotion for the Xbox Series X and The Falcon and the Winter Soldier, in which he is revealed to be the same character as "NoobMaster69" from Avengers: Endgame.

== Filmography ==
=== Film ===
Year	Title	Role	Notes
2009	Mystery Team	Duncan	
2010	Cherry	Wild Bill	
2010	Furry Vengeance	Student	Uncredited
2012	Grassroots	Wayne	
2013	Awful Nice	Sven	
2013	The To Do List	Hillcrest Lifeguard #1	
2014	Captain America: The Winter Soldier	Apple Employee	
2014	Balls Out	Bill	
2015	Wrestling Isn't Wrestling	Theater Audience Member	Short
2018	Dude	Biff (Drug Dealer)	

=== Television ===
Year	Title	Role	Notes
2007	CollegeHumor Originals	Various roles	6 episodes
2007–2010	UCB Comedy Originals	Various roles	16 episodes
2010–2011	Community	Mark Millot	5 episodes
2011	The Boys & Girls Guide to Getting Down	Chad	Television film
2012	Weeds	Deepak	Episode: "See Blue and Smell Cheese and Die"
2012	NerdTerns	Dylan Rousseau	Episode: "Jenny's Ex"
2012	Up All Night	Photographer	Episode: "Snow Day"
2013	1600 Penn	Casanova	Episode: "Bursting the Bubble"
2013	NTSF:SD:SUV::	Lance	Episode: "Trading Faces"
2013	5-Second Films	D.C.	Episode: "Settlers of Catan"
2013	Key & Peele	Funk Band Member	Episode: "Tackle & Grapple"
2013	Comedy Bang! Bang!	Rich Neckstein	Episode: "Andy Dick Wears a Black Suit Jacket & Skinny Tie"
2014	Growing Up Fisher	Guy	Episode: "Desk/Job"
2014–2017	Kirby Buckets	Mr. Krause	3 episodes
2015	Battle Creek	Bobby D	Episode: "Gingerbread Man"
2015	2 Broke Girls	Leo	Episode: "And the Minor Problem"
2016	Adam Ruins Everything	Mitchell	Episode: "Adam Ruins the Internet"
2016	Untitled Sarah Silverman Project	Bryan	Television film
2018	Here and Now	Brandon	Episode: "Eleven Eleven"
2018	Standup and Away! with Brian Regan	—	Episode: "Episode 2"
2019	Artista Obscura	TH Scooby	Television film
2020	Vibrant Visionaries	Guest	Episode: "DC Pierson on the Benefits of Developing a Growth Mindset"
2020	Brews Brothers	Indigo	Episode: "Krachtbal"
