= Samson (2018 film) =

- Theatrical release poster
- Directed by: Bruce Macdonald
- Written by: Jason Baumgardner; Zach Smith; Timothy Ratajczak; Galen Gilbert
- Produced by: Bruce Macdonald; David A. R. White; Vlokkie Gordon; Elizabeth Hatcher-Travis; Craig Jones; Michael Scott; Brittany Yost; Alysoun Wolfe
- Starring: Taylor James; Jackson Rathbone; Billy Zane; Caitlin Leahy; Rutger Hauer; Lindsay Wagner
- Cinematography: Trevor Michael Brown; Brian Shanley
- Edited by: Vance Null; Tim Goodwin; Gabriel Sabloff
- Music by: Will Musser
- Production companies: Pure Flix; Boomtown Films
- Distributed by: Pure Flix Entertainment
- Release date: February 16, 2018
- Running time: 109 minutes
- Countries: United States; South Africa
- Language: English
- Box office: $4.9 million

Samson is a 2018 South African-American Biblical drama film directed by Bruce Macdonald and inspired by the story of Samson in the Book of Judges. The film stars Taylor James as Samson, along with Jackson Rathbone, Billy Zane, Caitlin Leahy, Rutger Hauer, and Lindsay Wagner. The film was released in the United States on February 16, 2018. It was negatively reviewed by film critics and was a box office bomb.

== Plot ==
Samson is under a Nazirite covenant with God to deliver the Israelites from oppression. The Philistine king, Balek, commands his son Rallah to investigate. Rallah bribes a Philistine lord to hold a fight in hopes of drawing Samson out. Samson arrives and beats the strongman, while noticing the lord's daughter, Taren. Samson and Taren fall in love and desire marriage. Rallah's concubine Delilah convinces Rallah to allow the marriage to better control Samson.

At the wedding feast, Rallah tricks Samson into drinking wine, which is against his Nazirite vows. In response, Samson offers a riddle to Rallah and his guests. Unable to solve it, Rallah threatens Taren to find out the answer. Taren gets Samson to reveal it, but Delilah overhears, telling Rallah the answer. When Rallah declares the answer, Samson assumes Taren told him and storms off.

Samson arrives at a Philistine garrison, killing them all in self-defense. In order to take their tunics, he is forced to touch their dead bodies, breaking his second Nazirite vow. Upon returning, he finds that Rallah has married Taren in his place. Enraged, Samson destroys the Philistine grain fields. Rallah throws Taren and her father into the burning fields, killing them. Defeated, Samson flees to a cave.

The Philistines arrive at Samson's village and capture his father Manoah, demanding that Samson be surrendered to them. Despite Samson's surrender, Rallah promises to burn the village anyway and has Manoah executed. As he gives the order to kill Samson, Samson prays to God for strength. Samson slays 1,000 Philistines with the jawbone of a donkey, while Rallah barely survives.

Samson is anointed Judge. Samson goes to the Philistine capital to offer terms of peace with Balek. When Balek rejects the offer, Rallah decides to use Delilah to discover Samson's weakness. Delilah helps Samson escape and the two fall in love. Delilah asks what could bind Samson to her. Samson reveals that by cutting his hair, he would break his last Nazirite vow and lose his strength. Delilah drugs Samson to be able to cut his hair. As Delilah cuts Samson's hair, Rallah and his forces arrive to capture the now-powerless Samson and his brother Caleb. King Balek urges Rallah to kill Samson, but Rallah wants to use him as an object lesson to their enemies. In their shouting match, Rallah kills Balek and seizes the crown. Delilah comes to the dungeon with bail money to free Samson as penance, but he tells her to use it to free Caleb. Samson declares he is done following his own desires instead of God's and tells Caleb to prepare the Hebrews to capture the city.

Samson is taken to the temple of Dagon and abused by the Philistines. He prays once more for God's strength and pushes the two main pillars of the temple. As the building and Dagon's statue collapses, Samson, Rallah and Delilah are killed, but Caleb escapes and rallies the Hebrews.

== Cast ==
- Taylor James as Samson, a Nazarite with super-human strength
- Jackson Rathbone as Rallah, the prince of the Philistines
- Billy Zane as King Balek, the king of the Philistines and Rallah's father
- Lindsay Wagner as Zealphonis, Samson's mother
- Caitlin Leahy as Delilah, the partner of Rallah who seduces Samson
- Rutger Hauer as Manoah, Samson's father
- Brandon Auret as Ashdod
- Frances Sholto-Douglas as Taren, a Philistine woman who Samson falls in love with
- Greg Kriek as Caleb, Samson's brother
- James Ryan as Tobias, a Hebrew who is killed by Prince Rallah

== Release ==
Prior to its release, Pure Flix Entertainment sold Samson to various distributors around the globe such as California Films in Latin America, Pioneer in the Philippines, Scene Poong in South Korea, Sahamongkolfilm in Thailand, Özen in Turkey and others throughout Indonesia and Malaysia.

It was released in the United States on February 16, 2018, and made $1.9 million from 1,249 theaters in its opening weekend (an average of $1,556 per venue).

=== Critical response ===
On review aggregator website Rotten Tomatoes, the film has an approval rating of 27% based on 15 reviews, and an average rating of 5.1/10. On Metacritic, the film has a weighted average score of 17 out of 100, based on 6 critics, indicating "overwhelming dislike."

Inkoo Kang of TheWrap criticized the acting and direction, writing "the film is just plain bad, with an amateur cast (led by Taylor James), cut-rate special effects, who-cares storylines, and confusing details shoehorned in from the Bible." Writing for RogerEbert.com, Peter Sobczynski gave the film 1.5/4 stars, stating, "The problem with Samson is that while it cannot be faulted for its sincerity, it can be faulted for its sluggish pacing, inconsistent performances and lack of cinematic style".

Forbes contributor Luke Y. Thompson, while knocking the cheap-looking special effects and props, noted that Samson was "rarely boring" and that he did applaud Pure Flix "for actually trying to go big and stretch into biblical epics".
