= My Squirrel Days =

Book by Ellie Kemper

- Author: Ellie Kemper
- Language: English
- Genre: Memoir
- Publisher: Scribner
- Publication date: October 9, 2018
- Publication place: United States
- Pages: 256
- ISBN: 978-1-5011-6334-0

My Squirrel Days is an autobiographical comedy book by American actress Ellie Kemper. The book was published on October 9, 2018 and received mostly positive reviews.

== Synopsis ==
The book is a series of essays about Ellie Kemper's life. It includes tales of her childhood in St. Louis, Missouri and stories of her acting career. All the chapter headings are the names of roles Kemper has played during her acting career ("Redhead", "Receptionist", "Slob", "Starlet"). The title of the book comes from a story from Kemper's childhood about trying to befriend squirrels in her backyard after watching the film Dances with Wolves.

== Reception ==
The book received mostly positive reviews. Publishers Weekly called it "a fun, breezy, and enjoyable volume." Noor Brara noted that though the book contains many humorous stories, at its heart it is a book about hard work.
