= Dan Eckman =

American director, writer, and producer (born 1984)

- Born: January 27, 1984 (age 42); Manchester, New Hampshire, U.S.
- Occupations: Director, writer, producer
- Years active: 2002–present
- Spouse: Meggie McFadden
- Website: http://www.daneckman.com

Dan Eckman (born January 27, 1984) is an American director, writer, and producer. Eckman first came to attention for his work in the sketch group Derrick Comedy.

== Early life ==
Eckman was born on January 27, 1984, in Manchester, New Hampshire. He has been writing, producing, directing, and editing short films since the age of 15, and his work has been screened at numerous film festivals across the country. He graduated from New York University with a B.F.A. in Film and TV Production in 2005.

== Career ==
Eckman's career began when he started making sketch videos for the Derrick Comedy group along with fellow members Donald Glover, Dominic Dierkes, DC Pierson, and Meggie McFadden. His NYU undergraduate thesis film, CHECKOUT, won several awards, including Best College Short at the 2006 HBO US Comedy Arts Festival in Aspen.

In 2009, Derrick Comedy released the film Mystery Team, Derrick's first endeavor into the feature film world. The film premiered at the 2009 Sundance Film Festival.

Before making Mystery Team, Eckman was the video production director for Blue Man Group, where his work was seen on the 57th Primetime Emmy Awards, the 2005 Billboard Music Awards, on PBS, at Universal Orlando and in the Boston Children's Museum, among others.

Eckman, along with his other Derrick partners with the exception of Glover, made a guest appearance on Community as Pierce's joke writers.

In 2011, Eckman directed the MTV film Worst. Prom. Ever. which starred Daryl Sabara and was produced by Pierson and McFadden.

In 2011, Eckman directed the very first Childish Gambino music video, "Freaks and Geeks", and the video for his single "Bonfire".

In 2011, Eckman directed the thirteenth episode of the third season of Community.

== Personal life ==
Eckman married Meggie McFadden on July 10, 2010, in Paris.

== Filmography ==
Filmography
Year	Title	Role	Notes
2005	57th Annual Primetime Emmy Awards	segment director	
2006	Channel 101	Various	TV movie
2006	Keyboard Kid	director/editor	video short
2006	Bro Rape: A Newsline Investigative Report	director/editor	video short
2006	National Spelling Bee	director/editor	video short
2006	Celebrity	director/editor	video short
2006	Self Defense	director/editor	video short
2006	Girls Are Not to Be Trusted	director/editor	video short
2007	Jerry	director/editor	video short
2007	Emo Song	director/editor	video short
2007	Blowjob Girl	director/editor	video short
2007	Memory Loss	director/editor	video short
2009	Mystery Team	director/editor/producer/writer	Feature Film
2011	Worst. Prom. Ever.	director/editor	TV movie
2012	The Boy Who Couldn't Sleep and Never Had To	director/writer	

== Television ==
Year	Title	Role	Notes
2005	Billboard Music Awards	segment director	
2012	Community	director	Episode: "Digital Exploration of Interior Design"
