= Caitlin Leahy =

American actress and model (born 1988)

- Born: May 28, 1988 (age 37); Chicago, Illinois
- Occupation: Film actress
- Years active: 2013–present

Caitlin Leahy (born 1988) is an American actress and model. She is known for her roles in the 2018 film Samson, and the television series Black-ish and Queen of the South.

== Early life ==
Leahy was born and raised in Chicago, Illinois, to Matt and Ellen Leahy. The middle of five children, she has three sisters, Shannon, Cara, Brenna, and a brother, Ryan. She began training and performing at a young age, eventually studying theatre at the University of Illinois at Chicago before receiving her Bachelor of Arts from Columbia College Chicago.

== Career ==
In 2016 Leahy guest starred on an episode of ABC's Black-ish titled "Being Bow-Racial" which was the highest rated episode of season 3. Other notable roles include USA Network's Queen of the South, Showtime's Roadies, ABC's Secrets & Lies, and truTV's Those Who Can't.

In 2017 Leahy appeared in several TV series including BET's Rebel, the Lifetime film Michael Jackson: Searching for Neverland, and FX's Legion.

In March 2017, Leahy was cast as the female lead in the epic action film Samson playing the role of Delilah. The movie which filmed in South Africa was released in theatres in February 2018.

Leahy has modeled for numerous brands, such as Bentley Motors, Adidas, Chase Bank, Ritz Carlton, Honda, Schlitz Brewing Co. and HBO's Eastbound & Down.

== Filmography ==
=== Films ===
Year	Title	Role	Notes
2014	Like a Cowboy	Wife	
2014	Senior Slasher	Victim	Short
2014	Cadenza	Eloise	Short
2015	Discernment	Helena	Short
2015	The Flesh of My Lovers	Business Woman	Short
2015	We Went	Sage	
2015	Walk of No Shame	Amber Rose's Friend	Short
2017	Afterburn-Aftershock	Gianna Rossi	
2018	Samson	Delilah	
2018	God's Not Dead: A Light in Darkness	Television Host	

=== Television ===
Year	Title	Role	Notes
2013	The Bold and the Beautiful	Reporter	Episode #1.6
2016	Queen of the South	Aveline	Episode: "Cuarenta Minutos"
2016	Roadies	Doctor	Recurring role, 2 episodes
2016	Secrets & Lies	Call Girl	Episode: "The Statement"
2016	Those Who Can't	Katarina	Episode: "A New Dog in the Yard"
2016	Black-ish	Kelly	Episode: "Being Bow-Racial"
2016	Rebel	Detective Maxine Fox	Episode: "Chasing Ghosts"
2017	Michael Jackson: Searching for Neverland	Pretty Woman	TV movie
2018	Legion	Vermillion	Episode #2.1
