= Black Bear (film) =

2020 film by Lawrence Michael Levine

- Release poster
- Directed by: Lawrence Michael Levine
- Written by: Lawrence Michael Levine
- Produced by: Julie Christeas; Jonathan Blitstein; Richard J Bosner; Aubrey Plaza; Lawrence Michael Levine; Sophia Takal; Marina Grasic; Jai Khanna
- Starring: Aubrey Plaza; Christopher Abbott; Sarah Gadon; Paola Lázaro; Grantham Coleman
- Cinematography: Robert Leitzell
- Edited by: Matthew L. Weiss
- Music by: Giulio Carmassi; Bryan Scary
- Production companies: Oakhurst Entertainment; Productivity Media; Tandem Pictures; Blue Creek Pictures
- Distributed by: Momentum Pictures
- Release dates: January 24, 2020 (Sundance); December 4, 2020 (United States)
- Running time: 104 minutes
- Country: United States
- Language: English

Black Bear is a 2020 American psychological drama film written and directed by Lawrence Michael Levine. It stars Aubrey Plaza, Christopher Abbott, Sarah Gadon, Paola Lázaro, and Grantham Coleman.

The film premiered at the Sundance Film Festival on January 24, 2020, and was released in the United States on December 4, 2020, by Momentum Pictures. Filmed at a house powered by solar, batteries, and diesel generator, the film received the Gold "green-seal" from the Environmental Media Association for being produced sustainably.

== Plot ==
A young woman, Allison, sits on a dock at the edge of a foggy lake. She then retreats to a cabin and sits in a room where she looks at a notepad.

Part One: The Bear in the Road

At a remote lake house in the Adirondack Mountains, Gabe and Blair entertain film director Allison, an out-of-town guest and former actress looking for inspiration. Gabe's interest in her quickly becomes obvious, as does his unhappy relationship with his pregnant partner Blair. Blair and Gabe constantly bicker in front of an uncomfortable Allison, with Blair targeting Gabe's lackluster musical career and Gabe criticizing Blair's drinking habits. Allison becomes a part of these arguments, shifting between siding with Blair and Gabe and causing them to become even more aggressive to each other. When Gabe rants against the failings of modern society, Blair becomes upset and threatens to leave after Allison jokingly sides with Gabe's criticism of feminism. Allison awkwardly leaves as Blair and Gabe retreat to their bedroom; Blair accuses Gabe of being sexually attracted to Allison, but then they make up. After Blair falls asleep, Gabe meets Allison for a swim at the lake. Afterwards the two talk, and Gabe admits that the pregnancy with Blair had been an accident. In turn, Allison admits that she had lied about many things she had told him and Blair for no reason. They kiss and it appears they are about to have sex, but Blair interrupts them, attacks Gabe, and orders Allison to leave. She and Gabe argue violently until Gabe shoves her against a couch. Realizing that Blair is bleeding, Gabe orders Allison to get their car and drive them to the hospital. As she is driving, Allison is startled by a black bear in the road and swerves, crashing into a tree.

Part Two: The Bear by the Boat House

The lake house is now the setting of a film shoot in which Gabe is the director and Allison and Blair are actresses, though their roles in the production are switched, with Allison the scorned wife and Blair the interloper. Gabe and Allison have been married for years, but he is obviously rude and abrasive to her on set and favors Blair, which makes the crew uncomfortable. Gabe continually makes Allison upset by making her believe that he and Blair are having an affair, which they actually are doing in order to make Allison's acting feel more real and intense. However, they go too far and Allison begins drinking heavily, disappearing from the production and requiring the crew to bring her back. When Allison returns drunk to the set, Gabe notices and quietly chastises her in front of the crew, blaming her for demanding to be the lead actress. After repeated failed takes and arguments during the film's climactic argument scene, Allison eventually nails her part but begins fighting and hitting Blair for real. Gabe is delighted by the results, but Allison, still upset, retreats to a room and refuses to come out despite Gabe's annoyance and her friends' support. She orders a cameraman, Baako, to see her; when he arrives, she begins kissing him and pleads to him to lie to her that he loves her. After returning to set to reshoot the final moments of scene, Gabe asks Allison to not hit Blair. The scene plays out as intended, but Allison has a genuine, uncontrollable breakdown as she yells at "her husband" that he was supposed to love her, not "Blair." She continues sobbing even after the cameras are off. Gabe consoles her as the uncomfortable crew looks on.

Afterwards, Gabe takes her away to comfort her as the rest of the crew celebrates with a wrap party. Allison tells him that he should love Blair because she is better than her, and that she wishes that they could go back to the way things were before they were famous; she also calls him "Bear." Gabe assures her that there had been no affair with Blair, and that things will be different in the future. After she falls asleep, he leaves to sit with Blair. Allison wakes up alone and tries to find Gabe in a panic, eventually returning to the lake house and having a frightening encounter with a black bear on the way there. Witnessing Gabe and Blair having sex through a window, she becomes distraught as the bear appears behind her. She turns and appears to walk calmly toward it.

The film cuts back to the opening scene, with Allison alone looking at the foggy lake. She returns to the cabin to write, but this time she is seen writing "Black Bear" on the notepad before looking at the viewer.

== Cast ==
- Aubrey Plaza as Allison
- Sarah Gadon as Blair
- Christopher Abbott as Gabe
- Lindsay Burdge as Maude
- Alexander Koch as Mike
- Jennifer Kim as Nora
- Shannon O'Neill as Simone
- Grantham Coleman as Baako
- Paola Lázaro as Cahya
- Lou Gonzalez as Chris

== Production ==
In July 2019, it was announced that Christopher Abbott, Sarah Gadon and Aubrey Plaza had joined the cast of the film, with Lawrence Michael Levine directing from his screenplay.

=== Filming ===
Principal photography took place from July to August 2019 in the Adirondack Mountains in Long Lake, New York.

== Release ==
Black Bear had its world premiere at the Sundance Film Festival on January 24, 2020. Shortly thereafter, Momentum Pictures acquired US distribution rights to the film. It was released in theaters in the United States and on VOD platforms on December 4, 2020.

== Reception ==
On the review aggregator website Rotten Tomatoes, the film holds an approval rating of 89% based on 151 reviews, with an average rating of 7.5/10. The website's critics consensus reads, "A fascinating look at the creative intricacies of show business, Black Bear is a provocative, mind-bending experience – and finds Aubrey Plaza at the top of her game." On Metacritic, the film has a weighted average score of 79 out of 100, based on 23 critics, indicating "generally favorable" reviews. Reviewers have remarked on Plaza's performance in this film. Peter Bradshaw wrote "This is Plaza’s best role yet, her cool feline sensuality achieving something more mysterious than anything in her previous work."
