= Mystery Team =

2009 American comedy film

- Film release poster
- Directed by: Dan Eckman
- Screenplay by: Donald Glover; DC Pierson; Dominic Dierkes; Dan Eckman
- Story by: Donald Glover; DC Pierson; Dominic Dierkes; Dan Eckman; Meggie McFadden
- Produced by: Meggie McFadden
- Starring: Donald Glover; DC Pierson; Dominic Dierkes; Aubrey Plaza
- Cinematography: Austin F. Schmidt
- Edited by: Dan Eckman
- Music by: Donald Glover
- Production company: Derrick Comedy Productions
- Distributed by: Roadside Attractions
- Release dates: January 17, 2009 (Sundance); August 28, 2009 (United States)
- Running time: 97 minutes
- Country: United States
- Language: English
- Budget: < $1 million
- Box office: $89,442

Mystery Team is a 2009 American comedy film by the comedy group Derrick Comedy. The story was written by Donald Glover, DC Pierson, Dominic Dierkes, Dan Eckman and Meggie McFadden. It stars Glover, Pierson and Dierkes, was directed by Eckman and produced by McFadden. It also marked the feature film debuts for Aubrey Plaza, Ellie Kemper, Neil Casey, Ben Schwartz, and Bobby Moynihan. It premiered at the 2009 Sundance Film Festival, and was released in the United States on August 28, 2009.

== Plot ==
The Mystery Team consisting of "Master of Disguise" Jason Rogers, "Boy Genius" Duncan Wheeler, and the "Strongest Kid in town" Charlie Day began with three children who styled themselves as detectives, solving mostly kid-related mysteries such as missing cats or a lost baseball, but also gaining some local fame. The trio have remained as naïve as ever, although they are about to graduate from high school. They have continued the same mindset and antics even though they are teenagers, focusing on children's infractions, although adults (such as their parents) wonder when the teens will grow out of this attitude.

To prove to themselves and the town at large that they can be "real detectives", the Mystery Team take it upon themselves to solve a double homicide when they are hired by a young girl named Brianna to discover why her parents were killed. Although Duncan and Charlie are reluctant to help her, Jason convinces them to help her, stating that it is their chance to prove they can be real detectives and earn everyone's respect. Then they meet Brianna's older sister Kelly, whom Jason becomes attracted to, who tells them to let the cops handle it. They ignore her, and go to the local grocery store, where they are told by their friend Jordy that a hobo named Sam may know something. They are given stuff from Kelly's house from Sam and find a card from a local bowling alley with a symbol engraved in it. They go to the bowling alley where they meet a clerk, who has a grudge against them and refuses to scan the card. However, they spot a guy named Dougie, who the card belongs to, and see that he's wearing Kelly's ring. They follow Dougie to a local gentlemen's club where the bouncer attempts to throw them out for spying on Dougie and a stripper with him. However, they escape from the bouncer and Duncan and Charlie overhear Dougie saying that someone named Leroy gave him Kelly's ring and the ring is now in the stripper's vagina. Jason, Duncan and Charlie then retrieve the ring from the toilet the stripper urinated it into and escape from the gentlemen's club before the bouncer catches them.

After returning the ring to Kelly, they go back to Jordy, who tells them about Dougie and who Leroy is. Leroy Maddox is a dangerous drug dealer who used to work at the local lumber yard. After learning his address at the lumber yard, they go to his house claiming to want to buy drugs from him. Jason sneaks away and hears Leroy arguing with someone on the phone about finding some papers. After going to Kelly's house to find the papers, he finds Kelly and they both find a paper that states something called Iphedolene is extremely toxic. However, Leroy, who becomes suspicious of Duncan and Charlie, shows up at Kelly's house and takes them hostage but they manage to escape. After Kelly thanks Jason, who promises to tell everything to the police, he, Duncan and Charlie return to the lumber yard, where they find Leroy and his girlfriend's dead bodies. A horrified Duncan then decides to give up, despite Jason's objections. He and Charlie then reveal to Jason that they are going to college and leaving him, as he didn't apply. After a fed up Duncan and Jason get into a fight, he and Charlie abandon Jason. After going to talk to Kelly and Brianna, their dad's friend Robert Finney, who they have been staying with since their parents' death, helps fix his damaged bike. However, Jason realizes that Robert was the one he heard arguing with Leroy on the phone and quickly leaves.

After going to a police officer, who tells Jason he needs proof to believe him, he goes to the Holden and Charles Corporation, where Robert works and Kelly's father worked, but not before attempting to warn Kelly about Robert on a walkie-talkie he gave her, not knowing that Robert has it. At Holden and Charles, Jason bonds with two employees Jim and Frank, who get him drunk and give advice on asking Kelly out. After sneaking into Robert's office, Jason learns that Robert is trying to treat wood with the toxic substance Iphedolene. Kelly's father, who was a lawyer, learned this and was going to ruin the company and Robert, which is the reason Robert hired Leroy to scare him, not kill him. When Leroy kept asking for money, he killed him too. Duncan and Charlie, who heard Jason talking about Robert on a walkie-talkie, also show up to help him. The three are then confronted by Robert, but they manage to escape. After Jason makes up with Duncan and Charlie, Robert, who has taken Kelly hostage, uses the walkie-talkie to contact them into bringing the papers to the lumber yard. After they give him the papers, Robert holds them at gunpoint to kill them. When Jason tries to reason with Robert, he shoots him, but Charlie attacks him allowing the others escape. When Jason, who admits his feelings for Kelly and kisses her, finds a firecracker Jordy gave to him earlier, he gives it to Duncan, who lights it and shoots it at Robert with his slingshot, severely damaging his face. When the police show up, Robert is presumably arrested for his crimes and Jason has his wound tended to.

Months later, Jason is recovering from his gunshot wound, and has a job in medical technologies. His parents have adopted Brianna while Kelly is at Dartmouth College, but is still together with Jason. After Jason says goodbye to a departing Duncan and Charlie, a man comes out of the woods needing help. The film ends with the guys excitedly getting ready for another mystery in while the man shouts in anguish.

== Cast ==
- Donald Glover as Jason Rogers
- DC Pierson as Duncan Wheeler
- Dominic Dierkes as Charlie Day
- Aubrey Plaza as Kelly Peters
- Glenn Kalison as Robert Finney
- Peter Saati as Leroy Maddox
- Ellie Kemper as Jamie
- Matt Walsh as Jim
- Bobby Moynihan as Jordy
- Daphne Ciccarelle as Brianna Peters
- John Lutz as Frank
- Jon Daly as Greg Coleman
- Neil Casey as Broken Man
- Nick Packard as Dougie
- Ben Schwartz as Dougie's Buddy
- Will Hines as Mr. Stevens

== Production ==
In January 2008, Derrick Comedy took a hiatus from filming short online sketch videos to produce Mystery Team, which is the group's first feature-length production. The film was independently produced and shot over seven weeks in early 2008. It was shot on the Red camera, primarily in Manchester, New Hampshire, Eckman and McFadden's hometown.

The film's low budget came from their YouTube video sketches and producing online commercials for Clearasil.

== Release ==
Mystery Team premiered at the 2009 Sundance Film Festival as part of the Park City at Midnight series and was then released by Roadside Attractions in select cinemas on September 11 and 18, 2009. After a high frequency of demands on eventful.com, additional theater engagements included one starting in New York City on December 4. A private screening was also arranged for employees at Pixar. The film grossed $89,442 in the United States.

The film had its UK premiere in February 2012 at the Teenage Wasteland festival organized by Ultra Culture.

To promote the film, the group released a new online digital short starring the central characters, titled Mystery Team Adventures: The Case of the Haunted Hotel.

=== Home media ===
The film was released on DVD on May 25, 2010.

== Reception ==
On Rotten Tomatoes, the film holds an approval rating of 60% based on 20 reviews, and an average rating of 5.4/10. On Metacritic, the film has a weighted average score of 42 out of 100, based on six critics, indicating "mixed or average reviews".

Peter Debruge of Variety called the film "A genuinely funny but amateurishly constructed laffer from Derrick Comedy, a troupe of YouTube-savvy NYU grads with promising writing careers ahead of them." Kimberley Jones of the Austin Chronicle wrote: "The twentysomething talents behind Mystery Team are still in the comedy minors, but this nerdy, nutty, perfectly pitched first swing suggests there are major things to come."
