= Danny and the Deep Blue Sea =

Play written by John Patrick Shanley

- Original language: English
- Written by: John Patrick Shanley
- Genre: Drama
- Setting: Bronx bar, New York City

Premiere
- Date: June 1983
- Place: Circle in the Square Theatre, New York City

Danny and the Deep Blue Sea is a play by John Patrick Shanley.

The production, a one act play, revolves around two troubled characters, Danny and Roberta, who meet and strike up a conversation in a bar. John Turturro and June Stein originated the roles in 1983. Since its original production premiered Off-Broadway at the Circle in the Square Theatre it was revived in 2004 and was staged again in 2023, directed by Jeff Ward.

== Summary ==
Set in the Bronx, the story revolves around Danny and Roberta who strike up a conversation in a bar. "He is a brooding, self-loathing young man who resorts more to violence than reason; she is a divorced, guilt-ridden young woman whose troubled teenage son is now being cared for by her parents. Danny, whose fellow truck drivers call him “the animal,” seems incapable of tender emotion, while Roberta, who is still haunted by the memory of an ugly sexual incident involving her father, is distrustful of men in general."

== Characters ==
=== Cast ===
| Role | Circle in the Square Theatre, New York 1983 | Second Stage Theatre, New York 2004 | Lucille Lortel Theatre, New York 2023 |
|---|---|---|---|
| Danny | John Turturro | Adam Rothenberg | Christopher Abbott |
| Roberta | June Stein | Rosemarie DeWitt | Aubrey Plaza |

== Productions ==
The play is a two-person play which originated off-Broadway in 1983 at the Circle in the Square Theatre. It was directed by Barnet Kellman with the performances of Danny and Roberta being originated by John Turturro and June Stein respectively. The play was revived in 2004 starring Rosemarie DeWitt and Adam Rothenberg at the Second Stage Theatre off-Broadway.

In 2023 it was announced that the play would be revived again off-Broadway starring Aubrey Plaza and Christopher Abbott at the Lucille Lortel Theatre in a production directed by Jeff Ward and produced by Sam Rockwell.

== Reception ==
=== Reviews ===
Mel Gussow of The New York Times declared, "Performed without intermission, it is too long (85 minutes) to be approached as a vignette, and it is too dramatically underdeveloped to be regarded as a full-length double portrait...the play is the equivalent of sitting at ringside watching a prize fight that concludes in a loving embrace".

For the 2004 revival, David Rooney of Variety wrote, "A dark and dirty riposte to meet-cute Hollywood romances about lovable losers finding each other . . . the play traces the to-and-fro swing of the pendulum between the characters as hope and the possibility of love materialize before them, first as drunken make-believe and later as something frightening but real. Subtitled “An Apache Dance,” it unfolds like a pained pas de deux, its deliberate rhythms precisely choreographed".

== Awards and nominations ==
=== Original Off-Broadway production ===
| Year | Award | Category | Nominated work | Result | Ref. |
|---|---|---|---|---|---|
| 1983 | Obie Award | Outstanding Performance | John Turturro | Won | |
| 1983 | Theatre World Awards | | John Turturro | Won | |

=== 2024 Off-Broadway revival ===
| Year | Award | Category | Nominated work | Result | Ref. |
|---|---|---|---|---|---|
| 2024 | Drama League Awards | Outstanding Revival of a Play | Danny and the Deep Blue Sea | Nominated | |
| 2024 | Drama League Awards | Distinguished Performance | Aubrey Plaza | Nominated | |
| 2024 | Lucille Lortel Awards | Outstanding Revival | Danny and the Deep Blue Sea | Nominated | |
| 2024 | Lucille Lortel Awards | Outstanding Lead Performer in a Play | Christopher Abbott | Nominated | |
| 2024 | Lucille Lortel Awards | Outstanding Lighting Design | John Torres | Nominated | |
