= Derrick Comedy =

Internet sketch comedy group

Derrick Comedy was an Internet sketch comedy group from New York University. Their YouTube channel, where the group posted videos from 2006 to 2010, has over 240,000 subscribers and amassed over 115 million total video views as of 2024. Some notable YouTube videos include Bro Rape: A Newsline Investigative Report with over 11 million views, Girls Are Not To Be Trusted with over 10 million views, and National Spelling Bee with over 9 million views. They have released videos online, performed shows at venues such as New York's Upright Citizens Brigade Theatre, produced the 2009 film Mystery Team, and have appeared on national television.

== Members ==
Derrick Comedy consisted of Dominic Dierkes, DC Pierson, and Donald Glover. Derrick's director was Dan Eckman, and their producer was Meggie McFadden.

== History ==
The members of Derrick Comedy met at New York University while performing for the sketch comedy group Hammerkatz NYU and directing Wicked Wicked Hammerkatz.

They chose the name "Derrick" for Derrick Comedy because it was another name that started with the letter "D" other than their first names Donald, Dominic, or Dan.

=== Video sketches ===
Even though they are all experienced improvisers trained at the Upright Citizens Brigade Theatre, all of Derrick's videos are tightly scripted.

Some of their videos include: "New Bike", in which a boy hires an assassin to kill his parents because they failed to buy him a new bicycle; "Opposite Day", in which an office changes Fridays from "Casual Friday" to "Opposite Day", likely in response to the boss's wife's infidelity; "Girls Are Not To Be Trusted", in which a film student makes a series of movies chewing out his girlfriend; "National Spelling Bee", in which every contestant in a spelling bee was told to spell the word "niggerfaggot"; "Bro Rape: A Newsline Investigative Report", in which a news report showcases an imagined dilemma called "Bro Rape" in which partying young men known as "bros" utilize Family Guy, Jack Johnson, and Ultimate Frisbee to sexually assault other bros. Part of the video is a parody of To Catch a Predator as the reporter posed as a "bro" to lure unsuspecting "bro" rapists.

The group's last video sketch posted on their YouTube channel was titled "Thomas Jefferson" in which a news report presents the fact that Founding Father, Thomas Jefferson is still alive and proceeds to have an exclusive interview with him. The video has over 850,000 views and was posted on May 26, 2010. It was released to promote their movie, Mystery Team, being released on DVD.

=== Mystery Team ===
In January 2008, the group announced that they were taking a break from making internet videos while they worked on their first full-length feature film entitled Mystery Team, a comedy involving a childish trio of senior high school students solving a serious crime.

Mystery Team premiered at the 2009 Sundance Film Festival and was released in the United States on August 28, 2009 by Roadside Attractions. Mystery Team was later released on DVD on May 25, 2010. They also released a Mystery Team EP performed by Glover as Childish Gambino, featuring six tracks such as "The Stand" and "Get Like Me". The film grossed $89,442 in the United States. The budget for the film came from their YouTube video sketches and producing online commercials for Clearasil.

On review aggregator website Rotten Tomatoes, the film holds an approval rating of 58% based on 19 reviews, and an average rating of 5.4/10. On Metacritic, the film has a weighted average score of 42 out of 100, based on six critics, indicating "mixed or average reviews".

=== Community ===
Derrick Comedy (Eckman, MacFadden, Pierson, and Dierkes) appeared in the two first seasons of the 2009 U.S. television series Community as the Greendale sketch comedy troupe "The Greendale Gooffaws". Donald Glover was a regular on the series for the first five seasons playing Troy Barnes.
