= List of awards and nominations received by Donald Glover =

Donald Glover awards and nominations
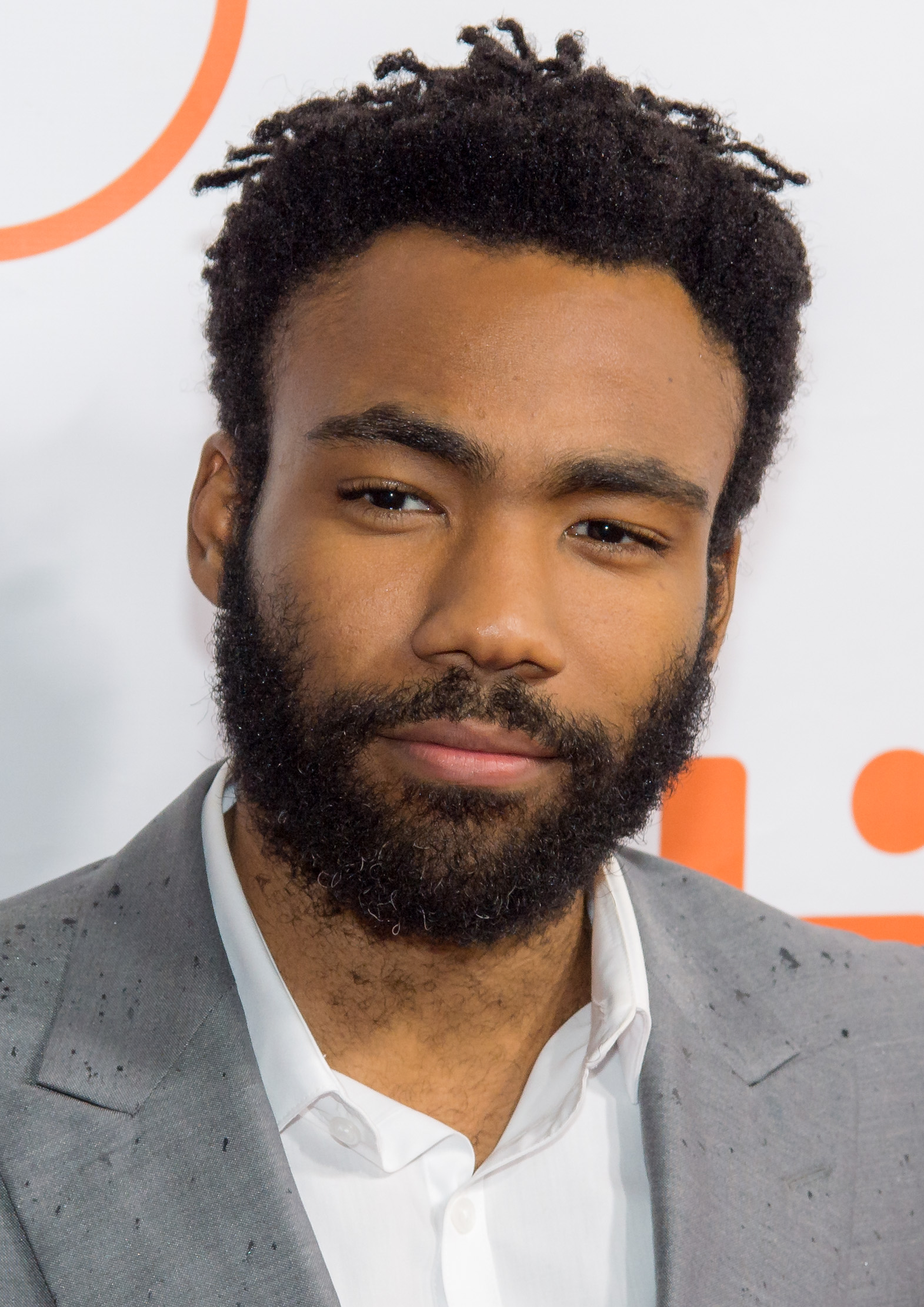
- Glover in 2015
Awards and nominations
Award	Wins	Nominations
Actor Awards	0	1
Critics' Choice Awards	1	5
Emmy Awards	2	14
Golden Globes	2	6
Grammy Awards	5	14

Totals (Note: Certain award groups do not simply award one winner. They acknowledge several different recipients, have runners-up, and have third place. Since this is a specific recognition and is different from losing an award, runner-up mentions are considered wins in this award tally. For simplification and to avoid errors, each award in this list has been presumed to have had a prior nomination.)
- Wins: 52
- Nominations: 201

Donald Glover is an American actor, comedian, director, rapper and screenwriter, also known under the stage name Childish Gambino. He has received numerous accolades throughout his career, including a two Primetime Emmy Awards, two Golden Globes, five Grammy Awards, two Peabody Awards, and five Writers Guild of America Awards, as well as a nomination for an Actor Award.

Glover started his career as a writer for the NBC sitcom 30 Rock in 2006. It earned him three Writers Guild of America Awards for Best Comedy Series. He then took on the role of Troy Barnes in another NBC sitcom, Community (2009–2014), thanks to which he received The Comedy Award for Breakout Performer of the Year as well as nominations at the NAACP Image Awards and Satellite Awards.

Glover was able to transition to more mature work as an actor, creator, and showrunner for the FX comedy drama series Atlanta (2016–2022), winning a Primetime Emmy Award and a Golden Globe Award for Best Actor in a Comedy Series, while also becoming the first African American to win the Primetime Emmy Award for Outstanding Directing for a Comedy Series. Atlanta earned him nine Emmy nominations in total.

Glover continued to create other series for Amazon Prime Video, such as the satirical black comedy series Swarm (2023) and the spy series Mr. & Mrs. Smith (2024–present), receiving a nomination for the Primetime Emmy Award for Outstanding Lead Actor in a Drama Series for the latter.

For his music, Glover's second studio album Because the Internet (2013) was nominated for the Grammy Award for Best Rap Album, while its lead single "3005" was nominated for the Grammy Award for Best Rap Performance. At the 60th Annual Grammy Awards, he received nominations for Album of the Year and Best Urban Contemporary Album for his third studio album "Awaken, My Love!" (2016) and earned his first win thanks to "Redbone", which won the Grammy Award for Best Traditional R&B Performance. In 2018, he released the single "This is America", that received critical acclaim and was his first chart-topper. It won four Grammy Awards, including Record of the Year, Song of the Year, Best Rap/Sung Performance, and Best Music Video.

== Major awards ==
=== Actor Awards ===
Year	Category	Nominated work	Result	Ref.
2019	Outstanding Ensemble in a Comedy Series	Atlanta	Nominated	

=== Critics' Choice Awards ===
Year	Category	Nominated work	Result	Ref.
Television
2016	Best Comedy Series	Atlanta	Nominated	
2016	Best Actor in a Comedy Series	Atlanta	Won	
2019	Best Comedy Series	Atlanta	Nominated	
2019	Best Actor in a Comedy Series	Atlanta	Nominated	
2020	Best Movie Made for Television	Guava Island	Nominated	

=== Emmy Awards ===
Year	Category	Nominated work	Result	Ref.
Primetime Emmy Awards
2017	Outstanding Comedy Series	Atlanta (season one)	Nominated	
2017	Outstanding Lead Actor in a Comedy Series	Atlanta (episode: "The Big Bang")	Won	
2017	Outstanding Directing for a Comedy Series	Atlanta (episode: "B.A.N.")	Won	
2017	Outstanding Writing for a Comedy Series	Atlanta (episode: "B.A.N.")	Nominated	
2018	Outstanding Comedy Series	Atlanta (season two)	Nominated	
2018	Outstanding Lead Actor in a Comedy Series	Atlanta (episode: "Teddy Perkins")	Nominated	
2018	Outstanding Directing for a Comedy Series	Atlanta (episode: "FUBU")	Nominated	
2018	Outstanding Writing for a Comedy Series	Atlanta (episode: "Alligator Man")	Nominated	
2018	Outstanding Guest Actor in a Comedy Series	Saturday Night Live (episode: "Host: Donald Glover")	Nominated	
2022	Outstanding Lead Actor in a Comedy Series	Atlanta (episode: "Sinterklaas Is Coming to Town")	Nominated	
2024	Outstanding Writing for a Limited Series or Movie	Swarm (episode: "Stung")	Nominated	
2024	Outstanding Drama Series	Mr. & Mrs. Smith	Nominated	
2024	Outstanding Lead Actor in a Drama Series	Mr. & Mrs. Smith (episode: "Couples Therapy")	Nominated	
2024	Outstanding Writing for a Drama Series	Mr. & Mrs. Smith (episode: "First Date")	Nominated	

=== Golden Globes ===
Year	Category	Nominated work	Result	Ref.
2017	Best Television Series – Musical or Comedy	Atlanta	Won	
2017	Best Actor in a Television Series – Musical or Comedy	Atlanta	Won	
2019	Best Actor in a Television Series – Musical or Comedy	Atlanta	Nominated	
2023	Best Actor in a Television Series – Musical or Comedy	Atlanta	Nominated	
2025	Best Television Series – Drama	Mr. & Mrs. Smith	Nominated	
2025	Best Actor in a Television Series – Drama	Mr. & Mrs. Smith	Nominated	

=== Grammy Awards ===
Year	Category	Nominated work	Result	Ref.
2015	Best Rap Album	Because the Internet	Nominated	
2015	Best Rap Performance	"3005"	Nominated	
2018	Album of the Year	"Awaken, My Love!"	Nominated	
2018	Best Urban Contemporary Album	"Awaken, My Love!"	Nominated	
2018	Record of the Year	"Redbone"	Nominated	
2018	Best Traditional R&B Performance	"Redbone"	Won	
2018	Best R&B Song	"Redbone"	Nominated	
2019	Record of the Year	"This Is America"	Won	
2019	Song of the Year	"This Is America"	Won	
2019	Best Rap/Sung Performance	"This Is America"	Won	
2019	Best Music Video	"This Is America"	Won	
2019	Best R&B Song	"Feels Like Summer"	Nominated	
2025	Best Dance/Electronic Recording	"Witchy"	Nominated	
2025	Best Progressive R&B Album	Bando Stone & the New World	Nominated	

== Other awards and nominations ==
Organizations	Year	Category	Work	Result	Ref.
AIM Independent Music Awards	2017	Independent Album of the Year	"Awaken, My Love!"	Nominated	
American Film Institute Awards	2016	Top 10 Television Programs	Atlanta	Won	
American Film Institute Awards	2018	Top 10 Television Programs	Atlanta	Won	
American Film Institute Awards	2024	Top 10 Television Programs	Mr. & Mrs. Smith	Won	
American Music Awards	2017	Favorite Soul/R&B Male Artist	Childish Gambino	Nominated	
American Music Awards	2017	Favorite Soul/R&B Album	"Awaken, My Love!"	Nominated	
Astra TV Awards	2022	Best Cable Comedy Series	Atlanta	Nominated	
Astra TV Awards	2022	Best Actor in a Broadcast Network or Cable Comedy Series	Atlanta	Nominated	
Astra TV Awards	2022	Best Writing in a Broadcast Network or Cable Comedy Series	Atlanta (for "Rich Wigga, Poor Wigga")	Nominated	
Astra TV Awards	2024	Best Streaming Drama Series	Mr. & Mrs. Smith	Nominated	
Astra TV Awards	2024	Best Actor in a Streaming Drama Series	Mr. & Mrs. Smith	Nominated	
Astra TV Awards	2024	Best Writing in a Streaming Drama Series	Mr. & Mrs. Smith (for "First Date")	Won	
BET Awards	2017	Best Actor	Atlanta	Nominated	
BET Awards	2018	Best Actor	Atlanta and Spider-Man: Homecoming	Nominated	
BET Awards	2019	Video of the Year	"This Is America"	Won	
BET Awards	2019	Viewer's Choice	"This Is America"	Nominated	
BET Awards	2019	Best Male R&B/Pop Artist	Childish Gambino	Nominated	
BET Awards	2023	Best Actor	Donald Glover	Nominated	
BET Awards	2024	Best Actor	Donald Glover	Nominated	
BET Hip Hop Awards	2018	Best Hip Hop Video	"This Is America"	Won	
BET Hip Hop Awards	2018	Single of the Year	"This Is America"	Nominated	
BET Hip Hop Awards	2018	Impact Track	"This Is America"	Won	
BET Hip Hop Awards	2018	Hot Ticket Performer	Childish Gambino	Nominated	
BET Hip Hop Awards	2018	Lyricist of the Year	Childish Gambino	Nominated	
BET Hip Hop Awards	2018	MVP of the Year	Childish Gambino	Nominated	
Billboard Music Awards	2018	Top R&B Song	"Redbone"	Nominated	
Billboard Music Awards	2019	Top R&B Tour	This Is America Tour	Nominated	
Black Reel Awards	2016	Best Original or Adapted Song	"Waiting Waiting for My Moment" (from Creed)	Nominated	
Black Reel Awards	2017	Outstanding Comedy Series	Atlanta	Won	
Black Reel Awards	2017	Outstanding Actor, Comedy Series	Atlanta	Won	
Black Reel Awards	2017	Outstanding Directing, Comedy Series	Atlanta	Nominated	
Black Reel Awards	2017	Outstanding Writing, Comedy Series	Atlanta	Won	
Black Reel Awards	2017	Outstanding Music (Comedy, Drama, Limited Series)	Atlanta	Nominated	
Black Reel Awards	2018	Outstanding Comedy Series	Atlanta	Won	
Black Reel Awards	2018	Outstanding Actor, Comedy Series	Atlanta	Won	
Black Reel Awards	2018	Outstanding Directing, Comedy Series	Atlanta (for "FUBU")	Nominated	
Black Reel Awards	2018	Outstanding Directing, Comedy Series	Atlanta (for "Barbershop")	Nominated	
Black Reel Awards	2018	Outstanding Writing, Comedy Series	Atlanta (for "Teddy Perkins")	Won	
Black Reel Awards	2018	Outstanding Writing, Comedy Series	Atlanta (for "FUBU")	Nominated	
Black Reel Awards	2018	Outstanding Guest Actor, Comedy Series	Saturday Night Live	Nominated	
Black Reel Awards	2019	Best Breakthrough Performance, Male	Solo: A Star Wars Story	Nominated	
Black Reel Awards	2020	Outstanding Independent Film	Guava Island	Nominated	
Black Reel Awards	2020	Outstanding Voice Performance	The Lion King	Nominated	
Black Reel Awards	2022	Outstanding Comedy Series	Atlanta	Nominated	
Black Reel Awards	2022	Outstanding Actor, Comedy Series	Atlanta	Won	
Black Reel Awards	2022	Outstanding Directing, Comedy Series	Atlanta (for "Rich Wigga, Poor Wigga")	Nominated	
Black Reel Awards	2022	Outstanding Directing, Comedy Series	Atlanta (for "Three Slaps")	Nominated	
Black Reel Awards	2022	Outstanding Writing, Comedy Series	Atlanta (for "Rich Wigga, Poor Wigga")	Nominated	
Black Reel Awards	2023	Outstanding Comedy Series	Atlanta	Nominated	
Black Reel Awards	2023	Outstanding Lead Performance in a Comedy Series	Atlanta	Nominated	
Black Reel Awards	2023	Outstanding Directing, Comedy Series	Atlanta (for "The Goof Who Sat By the Door")	Won	
Black Reel Awards	2023	Outstanding Writing, Comedy Series	Atlanta (for "It Was All a Dream")	Won	
Black Reel Awards	2024	Outstanding Lead Performance, Drama Series	Mr. & Mrs. Smith	Nominated	
Black Reel Awards	2024	Outstanding Directing, Drama Series	Mr. & Mrs. Smith (for "A Breakup")	Nominated	
Black Reel Awards	2024	Outstanding Writing, Drama Series	Mr. & Mrs. Smith (for "A Breakup")	Nominated	
Black Reel Awards	2024	Outstanding Writing, Drama Series	Mr. & Mrs. Smith (for "First Date")	Nominated	
Brit Awards	2018	International Male Solo Artist	Childish Gambino	Nominated	
Brit Awards	2021	International Male Solo Artist	Childish Gambino	Nominated	
Comedy Awards	2012	Breakout Performer of the Year	Community	Won	
Directors Guild of America Awards	2017	Outstanding Achievement in Directing – Comedy Series	Atlanta (for "B.A.N.")	Nominated	
Directors Guild of America Awards	2019	Outstanding Achievement in Directing – Comedy Series	Atlanta (for "FUBU")	Nominated	
EWwy Awards	2012	Best Supporting Actor in a Comedy Series	Community	Nominated	
GAFFA Awards (Denmark)	2019	Best Foreign Song	"This Is America"	Nominated	
Gotham Independent Film Awards	2017	Breakthrough Series – Long Form	Atlanta	Won	
Gotham Independent Film Awards	2023	Breakthrough Series – Short Form	Swarm	Nominated	
Gotham TV Awards	2024	Breakthrough Drama Series	Mr. & Mrs. Smith	Won	
iHeartRadio MMVAs	2018	Video of the Year	"This Is America"	Nominated	
iHeartRadio MMVAs	2018	Best Director	"This Is America"	Nominated	
iHeartRadio MMVAs	2018	Fan Fave Video	"This Is America"	Nominated	
iHeartRadio MMVAs	2018	Best Hip Hop Artist or Group	Childish Gambino	Nominated	
iHeartRadio Music Awards	2018	R&B Artist of the Year	Childish Gambino	Nominated	
iHeartRadio Music Awards	2018	R&B Song of the Year	"Redbone"	Nominated	
iHeartRadio Music Awards	2019	Best Music Video	"This Is America"	Nominated	
iHeartRadio Music Awards	2019	Song That Left Us Shook	"This Is America"	Nominated	
MTV Europe Music Awards	2018	Best Video	"This Is America"	Nominated	
MTV Movie & TV Awards	2017	Best Actor in a Show	Atlanta	Nominated	
MTV Video Music Awards	2012	Best Hip-Hop Video	"Heartbeat"	Nominated	
MTV Video Music Awards	2014	Best Hip-Hop Video	"3005"	Nominated	
MTV Video Music Awards	2015	Best Direction	"Sober"	Nominated	
MTV Video Music Awards	2015	Best Visual Effects	"III. Telegraph Ave."	Nominated	
MTV Video Music Awards	2018	Video of the Year	"This Is America"	Nominated	
MTV Video Music Awards	2018	Video with a Message	"This Is America"	Won	
MTV Video Music Awards	2018	Best Art Direction	"This Is America"	Nominated	
MTV Video Music Awards	2018	Best Choreography	"This Is America"	Won	
MTV Video Music Awards	2018	Best Cinematography	"This Is America"	Nominated	
MTV Video Music Awards	2018	Best Direction	"This Is America"	Won	
MTV Video Music Awards	2018	Best Editing	"This Is America"	Nominated	
MTV Video Music Awards	2019	Best R&B Video	"Feels Like Summer"	Nominated	
NAACP Image Awards	2013	Outstanding Supporting Actor in a Comedy Series	Community	Nominated	
NAACP Image Awards	2017	Outstanding Comedy Series	Atlanta	Nominated	
NAACP Image Awards	2017	Outstanding Actor in a Comedy Series	Atlanta	Nominated	
NAACP Image Awards	2017	Outstanding Directing in a Comedy Series	Atlanta	Won	
NAACP Image Awards	2017	Outstanding Writing in a Comedy Series	Atlanta	Nominated	
NAACP Image Awards	2019	Outstanding Comedy Series	Atlanta	Nominated	
NAACP Image Awards	2019	Outstanding Actor in a Comedy Series	Atlanta	Nominated	
NAACP Image Awards	2019	Outstanding Directing in a Comedy Series	Atlanta	Won	
NAACP Image Awards	2019	Outstanding Male Artist	Childish Gambino	Nominated	
NAACP Image Awards	2019	Outstanding Song – Contemporary	"This Is America"	Nominated	
NAACP Image Awards	2019	Outstanding Music Video	"This Is America"	Won	
NAACP Image Awards	2020	Outstanding Character Voice-Over Performance	The Lion King	Nominated	
NAACP Image Awards	2023	Outstanding Comedy Series	Atlanta	Nominated	
NAACP Image Awards	2023	Outstanding Actor in a Comedy Series	Atlanta	Nominated	
NAACP Image Awards	2024	Outstanding Television Movie, Mini-Series or Dramatic Special	Swarm	Won	
NAACP Image Awards	2024	Outstanding Directing in a Comedy Series	Swarm	Nominated	
NAACP Image Awards	2024	Outstanding Writing in a Comedy Series	Swarm	Nominated	
NAACP Image Awards	2025	Outstanding Actor in a Drama Series	Mr. & Mrs. Smith	Nominated	
NAACP Image Awards	2025	Outstanding Writing in a Dramatic Series	Mr. & Mrs. Smith	Nominated	
NewNowNext Awards	2012	Brink-of-Fame: Music Artist	Childish Gambino	Nominated	
PAAFTJ Television Awards	2012	Best Cast in a Comedy Series	Community	Won	
Peabody Awards	2017	Entertainment honoree	Atlanta	Won	
Peabody Awards	2023	Entertainment honoree	Atlanta	Won	
People's Choice Awards	2017	Favorite Cable TV Comedy	Atlanta	Nominated	
People's Choice Awards	2018	The Comedy TV Star of 2018	Atlanta	Nominated	
People's Choice Awards	2018	The Music Video of 2018	"This Is America"	Nominated	
Producers Guild of America Awards	2017	Outstanding Production – Episodic Comedy	Atlanta	Won	
Producers Guild of America Awards	2019	Outstanding Production – Episodic Comedy	Atlanta	Nominated	
Satellite Awards	2011	Best Supporting Actor – Series, Miniseries or Television Film	Community	Nominated	
Satellite Awards	2019	Best Television Series – Musical or Comedy	Atlanta	Nominated	
Satellite Awards	2019	Best Actor in a Television Series – Musical or Comedy	Atlanta	Nominated	
Satellite Awards	2023	Best Television Series – Musical or Comedy	Atlanta	Nominated	
Satellite Awards	2023	Best Actor in a Television Series – Musical or Comedy	Atlanta	Nominated	
Satellite Awards	2025	Best Television Series – Genre	Mr. & Mrs. Smith	Nominated	
Satellite Awards	2025	Best Actor in a Television Series – Drama or Genre	Mr. & Mrs. Smith	Nominated	
Soul Train Music Awards	2017	Song of the Year	"Redbone"	Nominated	
Soul Train Music Awards	2017	The Ashford & Simpson Songwriter's Award	"Redbone"	Nominated	
Soul Train Music Awards	2018	Best R&B/Soul Male Artist	Childish Gambino	Nominated	
Soul Train Music Awards	2018	Rhythm & Bars Award	"This Is America"	Nominated	
Soul Train Music Awards	2018	The Ashford & Simpson Songwriter's Award	"Summertime Magic"	Nominated	
Soul Train Music Awards	2019	Video of the Year	"Feels Like Summer"	Nominated	
TCA Awards	2017	Individual Achievement in Comedy	Atlanta	Won	
TCA Awards	2018	Individual Achievement in Comedy	Atlanta	Nominated	
Teen Choice Awards	2018	Choice Summer Movie Actor	Solo: A Star Wars Story	Nominated	
Teen Choice Awards	2018	Choice R&B/Hip-Hop Artist	Himself	Nominated	
Teen Choice Awards	2018	Choice Song: Male Artist	"This is America"	Nominated	
Teen Choice Awards	2018	Choice R&B/Hip-Hop Song	"This is America"	Nominated	
TV Guide Awards	2012	Favorite Ensemble	Community	Won	
Writers Guild of America Awards	2007	Outstanding Writing for a New Series	30 Rock	Nominated	
Writers Guild of America Awards	2007	Outstanding Writing for a Comedy Series	30 Rock	Nominated	
Writers Guild of America Awards	2008	Outstanding Writing for a Comedy Series	30 Rock	Won	
Writers Guild of America Awards	2009	Outstanding Writing for a Comedy Series	30 Rock	Won	
Writers Guild of America Awards	2010	Outstanding Writing for a Comedy Series	30 Rock	Won	
Writers Guild of America Awards	2017	Outstanding Writing for a New Series	Atlanta	Won	
Writers Guild of America Awards	2017	Outstanding Writing for a Comedy Series	Atlanta	Won	
Writers Guild of America Awards	2019	Outstanding Writing for a Comedy Series	Atlanta	Nominated	
Writers Guild of America Awards	2025	Outstanding Writing for a Dramatic Series	Mr. & Mrs. Smith	Nominated	
Writers Guild of America Awards	2025	Outstanding Writing for a New Series	Mr. & Mrs. Smith	Nominated	
Writers Guild of America Awards	2025	Outstanding Writing for a Dramatic Episode	Mr. & Mrs. Smith (for "First Date")	Nominated	
