= Crabs in a Barrel =

- Atlanta episode
- Episode no.: Season 2 Episode 11
- Directed by: Hiro Murai
- Written by: Stephen Glover
- Cinematography by: Christian Sprenger
- Editing by: Isaac Hagy
- Production code: XAA02011
- Original air date: May 10, 2018
- Running time: 30 minutes

Guest appearances
- Khris Davis as Tracy; RJ Walker as Clark County

Episode chronology
← Previous "FUBU"	Next → "Three Slaps"
- Atlanta season 2

"Crabs in a Barrel" is the eleventh episode and season finale of the second season of the American comedy-drama television series Atlanta. It is the 21st overall episode of the series and was written by executive producer Stephen Glover, and directed by executive producer Hiro Murai. It was first broadcast on FX in the United States on May 10, 2018.

The series is set in Atlanta and follows Earnest "Earn" Marks, as he tries to redeem himself in the eyes of his ex-girlfriend Van, who is also the mother of his daughter Lottie; as well as his parents and his cousin Alfred, who raps under the stage name "Paper Boi"; and Darius, Alfred's eccentric right-hand man. In the episode, Earn, Alfred and Darius prepare to leave for a European tour with Clark County as headliner. Before this, Earn and Van are informed about an important progress on Lottie.

According to Nielsen Media Research, the episode was seen by an estimated 0.553 million household viewers and gained a 0.3 ratings share among adults aged 18–49. The episode received critical acclaim, with critics praising the performances, character development, writing and set-up for the next season.

== Plot ==
Earn (Donald Glover) takes Lottie to a meeting with Alfred (Brian Tyree Henry) and an entertainment lawyer. Despite the lawyer claiming to represent multiple singers, Alfred later confides to Earn that he wants a Jewish lawyer, as he feels that he is being robbed by the lawyer. Alfred also has to prepare for a European tour, which will be headlined by Clark County (RJ Walker).

Earn also helps Alfred and Darius (Lakeith Stanfield) with packing their things for both a move and getting ready for the tour. During this, Alfred informs Earn that he found his golden gun and tells him to get rid of it, and Earn decides to put it in his backpack. He then goes with Van (Zazie Beetz) for a parents-teacher meeting at Lottie's school. Her teacher informs them that Lottie is a gifted student and that they should place her in a private school to accommodate her interests. Outside, they discuss the options, with Van telling Earn to be more present for their daughter.

While checking on the men helping with moving Alfred's stuff, Earn decides to accompany Darius to a passport agency as Darius' passport is expired. At the office (which is in a Jewish part of the city), Earn talks with the man attending them, who claims to have a cousin who is a good (presumably Jewish) lawyer. When Earn asks if he knows a "black lawyer" as good as his lawyer, the man claims that there is but that the black community does not have as many connections like his uncle did for his cousin. Earn then gets a message from Van, who tells him that she is considering moving with her mother and Lottie. Earn then asks Darius if Alfred will truly fire him as manager. Darius states that he improved as manager and even if Alfred fires him, he will always care for Earn as family. He says he wants to give Earn a "chance to see the world" by taking him to Europe.

Earn, Alfred and Darius spend a moment at the couch before leaving for the airport. At the airport, they rendezvous with Clark and Lucas (Matthew Barnes) as they prepare for the flight. As they pass their bags through security, Earn discovers that he is still carrying the golden gun. He smoothly slips it into Clark's bag. Moments later, Earn passes safely through security, and he joins Alfred and Darius as the security machines beep and a TSA agent calls out, demanding to know "whose bag is this?". Before the flight takes off, Alfred tells Earn that he saw him place the gun in Clark's bag. Alfred is not angry, he actually praises him for his actions, saying that they care for each other while other people just care for themselves. Suddenly, Clark appears on the plane without his manager Luke, claiming that TSA found a gun in Luke's bag. Earn tells Alfred that he placed the gun in Clark's bag (not Luke's) and Alfred sighs. Meanwhile, Tracy (Khris Davis) arrives at Alfred's house and starts knocking repeatedly, unaware that Alfred and the others have already left.

== Production ==
=== Development ===
"Sometimes you gotta go where the money goes. But it be feeling like something is holding me back. Like I can't leave."

— Official description in the press release for the episode.

In April 2018, FX announced that the eleventh episode of the season would be titled "Crabs in a Barrel" and that it would be written by executive producer Stephen Glover, and directed by executive producer Hiro Murai. This was Stephen Glover's eighth writing credit, and Murai's fourteenth directing credit.

== Reception ==
=== Viewers ===
The episode was watched by 0.553 million viewers, earning a 0.3 in the 18-49 rating demographics on the Nielson ratings scale. This means that 0.3 percent of all households with televisions watched the episode. This was a 21% decrease from the previous episode, which was watched by 0.694 million viewers with a 0.4 in the 18-49 demographics.

=== Critical reviews ===
"Crabs in a Barrel" received critical acclaim. The review aggregator website Rotten Tomatoes reported a 100% approval rating for the episode, based on 24 reviews, with an average rating of 9.3/10. The site's consensus states: "'Crabs in a Barrel' ends Atlanta's sophomore outing on a bittersweet high note that blends the surreal humor and thoughtful social commentary the series has become known for -- and concludes the Robbin' Season arc with big changes, questions resolved, and brilliantly subverted expectations."

Joshua Alston of The A.V. Club gave the episode an "A−" and wrote, "'Crabs' follows an even more direct path than season one's 'The Jacket', which mostly focused on its jarring episodic story before concluding with a thematically climactic montage. The biggest difference between the two Atlanta finales lies in their disparate tones. 'The Jacket', despite its police-involved shooting and the specter of death looming over Alfred, ended on a celebratory, triumph note. Meanwhile, 'Crabs' is most of a victory lap, but it feels like a funeral." Hanh Nguyen of IndieWire gave the episode an "A" and wrote, "Atlanta closed its finale with a bang, but not the literal one that many viewers and been braced for since the season began with a barrage of gunfire, a vibe that then continued with ongoing depictions of danger and violence."

Alan Sepinwall of Uproxx wrote, "This finale doesn't feel like a story that anyone's finished telling yet. I hope more comes soon, and I can't wait to see whatever crazy, sad, funny thing it might be." Matt Miller of Esquire wrote, "So goes the cycle of Atlanta: Robbin' Season: You're only getting ahead at someone else's expense, because that's the way things work in America." Bryan Washington of Vulture gave the episode a perfect 5 star rating out of 5 and wrote, "Robbin Season's low points were higher highs than those of its counterparts. Its singular exchanges surpassed other series' entire plotlines, with casual gestures stronger than their whole narrative arcs. It was aggressively better. And it would be premature to say when it will happen again, but Atlanta's existing has ensured that it will happen again."

Emily St. James of Vox wrote, "The second season of Atlanta might be the best TV I see all year. It’s hard to imagine what would top it." Dan Jackson of Thrillist wrote, "It's the work of a team of writers, actors, and directors who have successfully tuned out the decoders of the world. Hopefully as Glover's star continues to rise, Atlanta will retain that closed-off quality. Lando is free to explore a galaxy far, far away, but Atlanta has created a rich universe right here on Earth." Sonia Saraiya of Vanity Fair wrote, "The seductive, off-kilter, brutally honest brainchild of Donald Glover delivers a finale that is purposefully hard to live with."

Leigh-Anne Jackson of The New York Times wrote, "The writer, Stephen Glover, eschewed the surrealism and shock tactics that have shaped this season and replaced them with thoughtful tête-à-têtes and straight talk." Jacob Oller of Paste gave the episode an 8 out of 10 rating and wrote, "with 'Crabs in a Barrel', Glover finds a throughline in his disparate interests and reckons with the systems he faced to succeed in each." Alison Herman of The Ringer wrote, "We haven't been trained to expect answers from Atlanta, yet this finale delivers them regardless. With 'Crabs in a Barrel', the most surprising show on television gave us one more burst of novelty: closure."
