= Money Bag Shawty =

- Atlanta episode
- Episode no.: Season 2 Episode 3
- Directed by: Hiro Murai
- Written by: Stephen Glover
- Cinematography by: Christian Sprenger
- Editing by: Isaac Hagy; Kyle Reiter
- Production code: XAA02003
- Original air date: March 15, 2018
- Running time: 25 minutes

Guest appearances
- Blair Busbee as Lily's Mom; RJ Walker as Clark County; Khris Davis as Tracy; Michael Vick as himself

Episode chronology
← Previous "Sportin' Waves"	Next → "Helen"
- Atlanta season 2

"Money Bag Shawty" is the third episode of the second season of the American comedy-drama television series Atlanta. It is the 13th overall episode of the series and was written by executive producer Stephen Glover, and directed by co-executive producer Hiro Murai. It was first broadcast on FX in the United States on March 15, 2018.

The series is set in Atlanta and follows Earnest "Earn" Marks, as he tries to redeem himself in the eyes of his ex-girlfriend Van, who is also the mother of his daughter Lottie; as well as his parents and his cousin Alfred, who raps under the stage name "Paper Boi"; and Darius, Alfred's eccentric right-hand man. In the episode, Alfred's newest single goes gold after a video where a woman complains about the lyrics goes viral. With his profits, Earn decides to take Van on a date but the date escalates into complicating scenarios when they experience racial incidents. Meanwhile, Alfred and Darius meet with Clark County for a collaboration, where they see the nature of his true behavior.

According to Nielsen Media Research, the episode was seen by an estimated 0.561 million household viewers and gained a 0.3 ratings share among adults aged 18–49. The episode received extremely positive reviews from critics, who praised Donald Glover's performance and humor. However, one critic found Michael Vick's appearance in the episode "distracting".

== Plot ==
The episode begins with a Caucasian woman (Blair Busbee) posting Instagram stories, where she tells her audience her frustration with a new song by "Paper Boi" after listening to her young daughter singing it. She recites the song's explicit and controversial lyrics but gets truly angry and frustrated when the song ends with a statement supporting Colin Kaepernick.

At a bar, Earn (Donald Glover), Alfred (Brian Tyree Henry) and Darius (Lakeith Stanfield) are celebrating that Alfred's newest single has gone gold, crediting the woman's video for boosting its popularity. With their new money, Earn decides to take Van (Zazie Beetz) on a date. Meanwhile, Alfred and Darius meet with Clark County (RJ Walker) to join a recording session, with Alfred set to provide guest verses. During the session, Alfred notes that Clark raps about enjoying drinking and smoking, despite being apparently abstinent. When the record program crashes while he freestyles, Clark threatens the audio engineer.

Earn and Van go to the movie theater. However, when Earn tries to pay in cash, the cashier refuses the $100 bill. When Earn tries to use his debit card, the cashier informs him that she'll have to make a copy of his card and ID every time she swipes the card, which frustrates him. They leave, but Earn notices a white man buying his tickets off a $100 bill without any complications. Earn intends to question him before the man reveals his holstered gun, prompting them to leave. Back at the record session, the program once again crashes, and Clark decides to go out for a walk. His crew then tell Alfred and Darius that they should leave, indicating that the engineer will be violently punished.

Earn and Van then head to a hookah bar after paying for their entrance. However, Earn is questioned by the staff, who claim that the $100 bill that he gave to the guard is a counterfeit bill. The owner claims it's fake and Earn decides to leave, although he is forced to pay for his entry again as he was already in the club. As they head outside, a security guard confirms the bill is real but that the owner intentionally dismissed them, and tells Earn he can't legally return the currency to him. He decides to call Alfred, inviting him to a strip club. He, in turn, takes Darius and Tracy (Khris Davis) to meet with Earn and Van, who have rented a limo.

At the strip club, Earn changes his $100 bill into $1 bills, although he's forced to give a minimum $200 as well as losing 20% of the money. He is then pressured by the club's announcer to tip a dancer, which he reluctantly does. Despite paying for the table, Earn has to pay $200 just to get drinks and even has to pay a stripper just for dancing a few seconds in front of Van. He also gives bills to Van so she can pay a dancer out of pity as she has garnered little traction. Alfred then discusses the bill situation with Earn, telling him he needs to "act better" than others if he wants good treatment. Earn and Van decide to leave the strip club, where they see a crowd seeing Michael Vick racing other people for cash bets. Earn decides to compete with Vick to prove himself, with Earn clearly seen as ahead of Vick when the race starts. The scene then cuts to the limo with a dejected Earn and Van, Earn having lost the race and Van consoling him by saying "It's Michael Vick!".

== Production ==
=== Development ===
"Earn is out here making that money. Too bad he still look broke as hell. This whole city runs on stunting, you feel me?"

— Official description in the press release for the episode.

In February 2018, FX announced that the third episode of the season would be titled "Money Bag Shawty" and that it would be written by executive producer Stephen Glover, and directed by co-executive producer Hiro Murai. This was Stephen Glover's sixth writing credit, and Murai's tenth directing credit.

=== Casting ===
The episode features a cameo appearance by former quarterback Michael Vick, who appears at the end of the episode where he races people. Vick's wife, Kijafa, put him in contact with Glover, and he agreed to appear in the episode. After the episode aired, Vick said that he received offers for racing people outside clubs.

== Reception ==
=== Viewers ===
The episode was watched by 0.561 million viewers, earning a 0.3 in the 18-49 rating demographics on the Nielson ratings scale. This means that 0.3 percent of all households with televisions watched the episode. This was a 22% decrease from the previous episode, which was watched by 0.714 million viewers with a 0.4 in the 18-49 demographics.

With DVR factored, the episode was watched by 1.41 million viewers with a 0.8 in the 18-49 demographics.

=== Critical reviews ===
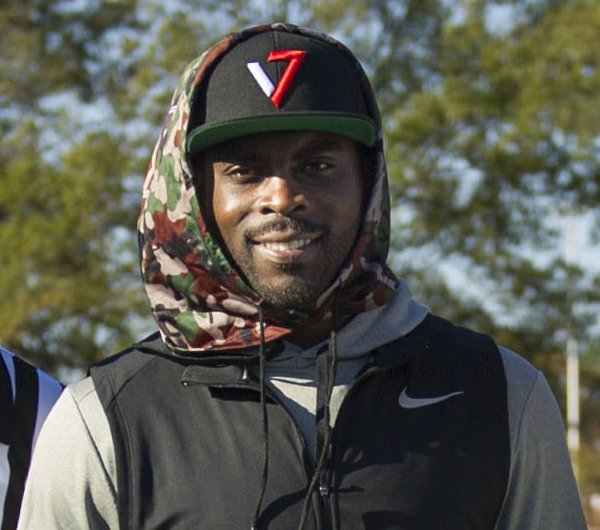
Michael Vick's appearance in the episode was criticized by IndieWire.

"Money Bag Shawty" received extremely positive reviews from critics. The review aggregator website Rotten Tomatoes reported a 91% approval rating for the episode, based on 11 reviews, with an average rating of 8.3/10.

Joshua Alston of The A.V. Club gave the episode an "A−" and wrote, "The more things change, the more they stay the same. That's especially true in Atlanta, a show that's most comfortable when its characters are in an awkward state of arrested development." Ben Travers of IndieWire praised the episode but criticized Vick's appearance, "once Vick shows up, the conversation shifts. Why is Michael Vick in this episode? Why is he on this show? More specifically, why are the producers of Atlanta paying and, arguably, celebrating a man who spent 21 months in federal prison for running a dogfighting ring?"

Alan Sepinwall of Uproxx wrote, "There's a sense of futility baked into Atlanta, where no matter how successful Paper Boi becomes, and no matter how much money Earn makes as his manager, things will never quite work out the way they want. It's basic comic/dramatic tension. But the many ways in which things don't work out are as surprising and fun as the understated character Donald Glover created for himself to play." Matt Miller of Esquire wrote, "The spectrum of these perspectives points to the shades with which Atlanta colors these issues. Truly, there are 'problems between black and white relations in this country based on misunderstandings', and Atlanta is right to point out the nuances of this issue, as Donald Glover has always attempted to do with the show." Bryan Washington of Vulture gave the episode a 4 star rating out of 5 and wrote, "Van is Atlanta's most elusive character, which is to say that she's the least autonomous. That's my issue with this episode, as with this series so far: We rarely get to see her on her own. Except for that one episode last season."

Leigh-Anne Jackson of The New York Times wrote, "They both empathize with Earn's plight and ultimately hit him with some frank advice: In order to get treated like he's better than other people, he needs to start acting like he's better than them. If their skewed version of respect is truly what Earn's after, maybe it's time for him to tap into a little Princeton panache. Or, at the very least, an age-appropriate wardrobe." Jacob Oller of Paste gave the episode an 8.5 out of 10 rating and wrote, "Last week, Atlanta showed us what happens when you give a taste of cash to someone who isn't ready for it and deny that taste to someone too thirsty for it. With 'Money Bag Shawty', the series suggests that money magnifies the essence of the person who has it: Earn has money, so of course the underdog is going to push his ego onto it." Alison Herman of The Ringer wrote, "'Money Bag Shawty' is, in essence, an episode-long version of the line from last season in which Earn, explaining why he can't get Al the money he's due from a club appearance, whines: 'N----s know I drink juice and shit, man!' Given that locking down payment is the sum total of a manager's job, Earn has to put down the juice box before it's too late. Knowing Earn, though, he'll be too busy licking his Michael Vick–inflicted wounds. Remember what Uncle Willy said!"
