= Atlanta season 2 =

Season of television series

Atlanta: Robbin' Season
- Season 2
- Promotional poster
- Showrunner: Donald Glover
- Starring: Donald Glover; Brian Tyree Henry; Lakeith Stanfield; Zazie Beetz
- No. of episodes: 11

Release
- Original network: FX
- Original release: March 1 – May 10, 2018

Season chronology
- ← Previous; Season 1 Next → Season 3

The second season of the American television series Atlanta, titled Robbin' Season, premiered on March 1, 2018. The season is produced by RBA, 343 Incorporated, MGMT. Entertainment, and FXP, with Donald Glover, Paul Simms, Dianne McGunigle, Stephen Glover, and Hiro Murai serving as executive producers. Donald Glover serves as creator and showrunner, and wrote two episodes for the season.

The season was ordered in September 2016. It stars Donald Glover, Brian Tyree Henry, LaKeith Stanfield, and Zazie Beetz. The series follows Earn during his daily life in Atlanta, Georgia, as he tries to redeem himself in the eyes of his ex-girlfriend Van, who is also the mother of his daughter Lottie; as well as his parents and his cousin Alfred, who raps under the stage name "Paper Boi"; and Darius, Alfred's eccentric right-hand man.

The season premiered on March 1, 2018, on FX. The season premiere received 0.851 million viewers with a 0.4 ratings share in the 18–49 demographics. The season ended on May 10, 2018, with an average of 0.64 million viewers, which was a 28% decrease from the previous season. The season received critical acclaim, with critics praising its cast, writing, creativity, and suspenseful atmosphere, with many deeming it an improvement over the previous season. At the 70th Primetime Emmy Awards, the season was nominated for 8 awards, including Outstanding Comedy Series. In June 2018, FX renewed the series for a third season.

== Cast and characters ==
=== Main ===
- Donald Glover (Note: Glover is only credited for the episodes he appears in, with addition to "Teddy Perkins" where he was credited as the eponymous character.) as Earnest "Earn" Marks and Teddy Perkins
- Brian Tyree Henry (Note: Henry is only credited for the episodes he appears in.) as Alfred "Paper Boi" Miles
- LaKeith Stanfield (Note: Stanfield is only credited for the episodes he appears in.) as Darius
- Zazie Beetz (Note: Beetz is only credited for the episodes she appears in.) as Vanessa "Van" Keefer

=== Recurring ===
- Khris Davis as Tracy
- RJ Walker as Clark County

=== Guest ===
- Katt Williams as Willie
- Michael Vick as himself
- Robert Powell III as Bibby
- Adriyan Rae as Candice
- Danielle Deadwyler as Tami
- Alkoya Brunson as Young Earn
- Myles Truitt as Devin Meyers

== Episodes ==
No. overall	No. in season	Title	Directed by	Written by	Original release date	Prod. code	U.S. viewers (millions)
11	1	"Alligator Man"	Hiro Murai	Donald Glover	March 1, 2018	XAA02001	0.851
Two teenagers rob a Mrs. Winner's that doubles as a drug selling operation, getting into a gunfight with an armed employee. Earn is evicted from his storage locker. While Darius drives Earn to see his probation officer, Earn mentions that his parents are visiting Florida. Earn is then tasked by Al to go visit their uncle Willy, who is having a domestic dispute with his girlfriend. Both she and Willy antagonize the police when Earn tries to defuse the situation, and Earn talks to his uncle about his fear that Al will abandon him. Willy gives him a gold-plated gun that he will "need in the music business" and releases his pet alligator to distract the police while he runs. Earn asks Al if he can move in with him, but finds that Al's recently released ex-convict friend Tracy has already done so. This episode references the Florida Man meme, which is mentioned throughout the episode by Darius and Willie. Title card: The city of Atlanta Opening song: "Did It Again" by Jay Critch & Rich the Kid Closing song: "When Seasons Change" by Curtis Mayfield
12	2	"Sportin' Waves"	Hiro Murai	Stephen Glover	March 8, 2018	XAA02002	0.714
Al's long-time drug dealer robs him, forcing him and Darius to try and find a new one, but he finds that his newfound fame makes this difficult as he goes through several irritating dealers. Tracy shows Earn how to scam thousands of dollars out of a gift card before it shuts down and takes him to the mall, but abandons him to go to a job interview, leaving Earn inundated with merchandise. In a post-credits scene, Tracy is told that there are no positions available, and he furiously accuses the interviewer of racism. Title card: Guardrail Opening song: "All There" by Jeezy Closing song: "Paper Boi (Acoustic Cover)" by Amber (Bryce Hitchcock)
13	3	"Money Bag Shawty"	Hiro Murai	Stephen Glover	March 15, 2018	XAA02003	0.561
Earn gets a substantial payout after Al's newest single goes gold, so he decides to take Van out for a night. Both the movie theater and club they go to rip him off. Al is invited to a studio session with popular rapper Clark County, where he learns that County fakes his rapper lifestyle. County's sound engineer continually makes mistakes, and the session ends so the man can be punished. Al takes Earn and Van to a strip club with Darius and Tracy, where Earn is ripped off for more of his money. Al tells him that his problem is that he does not act tough enough, and so he tries to salvage his pride by racing Michael Vick in the parking lot for money, but loses. The episode's cold open is an homage to the viral video of a mother reciting and criticizing the lyrics to Vince Staples' "Norf Norf". Title card: Side of a passing bus Opening song: "MF'N Right" by 2 Chainz Closing song: "Marsupial Superstars" by SahBabii
14	4	"Helen"	Amy Seimetz	Taofik Kolade	March 22, 2018	XAA02005	0.499
Earn accompanies Afro-German Van to a Fastnacht celebration in Helen, although he spends most of it complaining about the bizarre rituals involved. Van and her fellow Afro-German friend argue over their identities, and she and Earn argue over his behavior and control over what they get to do together. After getting her phone stolen by a man dressed up as the traditional Schnappviecher monster, she finds a text from Earn asking her to talk. Van states that Earn is not interested in a real relationship and only is with her for sex, and challenges him to a game of table tennis to decide the fate of their relationship. The outcome is not shown, but the next day, they drive back in silence and she says an emotionless goodbye to him, implying that she won the game. Parts of the episode bear similarities to the film Get Out. Title card: Wall of Van's bedroom Opening song: "At Sea Again" by Slime Closing song: "My Angel" by Harry Belafonte & Miriam Makeba
15	5	"Barbershop"	Donald Glover	Stefani Robinson	March 29, 2018	XAA02004	0.607
Al goes to his regular barber Bibby to get his hair cut, but is waylaid by Bibby's constant efforts to make money and his personal dramas. They deal with him not paying his girlfriend's bills and cutting her son's hair, stealing lumber from a work site, chasing down and grabbing Bibby's delinquent son, and getting into a hit and run before finally get back to the barbershop and getting Al's hair cut. Some time later, he comes in for another cut and makes a point of choosing a different barber, but realizes that neither he nor the new barber understand how he likes his hair. Musical score by: Flying Lotus and Thundercat Title card: Poster in the barbershop
16	6	"Teddy Perkins"	Hiro Murai	Donald Glover	April 5, 2018	XAA02006	0.776
Darius answers a Craigslist ad offering up a free, rainbow-keyed piano, and goes to a mansion owned by a strange, pale man named Theodore "Teddy" Perkins. Teddy claims his brother, Benny Hope, was a famous musician that he was forced to take care of once he developed a photosensitive condition, and that their father beat them both while trying to turn them into great musicians. While trying to move the piano down to his truck, the mansion's elevator accidentally takes Darius to the basement, where he meets Benny, who is unable to walk or speak. Benny communicates that Teddy is planning to kill them both and that Darius needs to get a shotgun from the attic. Darius tries to leave, but finds that Teddy has blocked his truck in. Teddy corners him with the gun and explains that he plans to kill Darius and Benny, staging the former as a home intruder who murdered the latter. Darius tries to convince Teddy to let him go by telling him about his own abusive father until Benny comes up through the elevator and kills Teddy and himself with the gun. The police take both the corpses and the piano as Darius, visibly troubled, drives away. This episode references the psychological pressures and traumas child stars sometimes face, especially ones with abusive and controlling stage parents such as Michael Jackson, Marvin Gaye, Tiger Woods, and Serena Williams. Title card: Darius driving down the road Opening song: "Sweet Little Girl" by Stevie Wonder Closing song: "Evil" by Stevie Wonder
17	7	"Champagne Papi"	Amy Seimetz	Ibra Ake	April 12, 2018	XAA02007	0.694
Van and her friends Candice, Tammi and Nadine go to a New Year's Eve party at Drake's mansion. The women take edibles upon arrival and Van seeks out Drake for a photo for Instagram, only to get waylaid by Nadine reacting badly to her drug. Nadine finds Darius sitting by a pool, who converses with her about the nature of reality. While looking for Drake, Van finds a Mexican man who claims to be Drake's grandfather and finds that Drake is actually on tour in Europe. When she finds "Drake", she learns he is actually a cardboard cutout that people are paying to take pictures with. Tammi notices that a black actor she is attracted to is married to a white woman, and she argues with her about the realness of their marriage. After Candice leaves to go to a separate party hosted by T-Pain, Van and Tammi find Nadine and Darius and the four walk home, where Van has an epiphany that "Drake's Mexican." The episode briefly touches upon the feminine beauty ideal and some negative effects of social media. The Bostrom simulation argument is also mentioned. Part of this episode is later interpolated in the song "In My Feelings" by Drake from the album Scorpion. Title card: Tablecloth Opening song: "Never Created, Never Destroyed" by Jlin Closing song: "Cuando suena el bling" (Hotline Bling Spanish Remix) by Fuego
18	8	"Woods"	Hiro Murai	Stefani Robinson	April 19, 2018	XAA02008	0.595
Al wakes up from a dream about his mother and goes to a salon with a girlfriend, but leaves when he realizes she is just using him for social media clout. He encounters a trio of fans on the way home who rob him, forcing him to flee into the nearby woods. He gets lost and encounters an old man named Wiley, who holds a knife to his throat after arguing with him about the way he treats people. He gives Al thirty seconds to escape the woods, and he barely does, breaking down in tears before laughing with relief. He goes to a nearby gas station to get something cold to put on his battered face, and takes a selfie with a fan when asked, breaking his usual tradition. Title card: Coaster Opening song: "Meditate" by EarthGang In lieu of a closing song, a dedication to Henry's mother, Willow Kearse-Rice, aired instead; she died on May 12, 2016.
19	9	"North of the Border"	Hiro Murai	Jamal Olori	April 26, 2018	XAA02009	0.487
Tracy and the guys go to a college in Statesboro, where Al and County are scheduled to perform. Earn has failed to book proper lodgings, so they are forced to stay with a student who has an obsessive crush on Al. When she sees him talking to other women after the show, she throws her drink on him, and Tracy pushes her down the stairs and punches one of her friends in the face, forcing them to flee to a nearby all-white frat house. They are sat in front of a large Confederate flag and watch a hazing ritual, while Al informs Earn that he is considering dropping him due to his failures in favor of County's competent white manager Lucas. The next morning, the guys find their stuff torn apart and Earn realizes his laptop is locked inside the girl's room, pulling the fire alarm in desperation to try and get her out. On the way back, Earn snaps when Tracy mocks and pulls an antique gun he stole from the frat house on him, demanding Al pull over, only to immediately lose when he fights Tracy. The silk pajamas Earn, Alfred and Darius wear throughout much of the episode bear a strong resemblance to those worn by TLC in the music video for "Creep". Title card: Cylinder of Al's gun Opening song: "Patty Cake" by Kodak Black Closing song: "Am I a Good Man" by Them Two
20	10	"FUBU"	Donald Glover	Stephen Glover	May 3, 2018	XAA02010	0.694
In the late 1990s, a middle-school aged Earn gets his mom to buy him a yellow FUBU shirt, but learns that his classmate Devin is wearing a nearly identical shirt, leading their classmates to conclude that one of the shirts is fake. Earn asks Al for help, who interrupts when Earn is confronted by his classmates and convinces them that Devin's shirt is the fake, and he is relentlessly bullied by upperclassmen. The next day, Earn learns that Devin committed suicide, which is blamed on his parents' divorce. At Earn's house, his and Al's mothers remind the boys to watch out for each other because of their familial bond. Title card: Wall of a Marshalls Opening song: "Give Me One Reason" by Tracy Chapman Closing song: "If I Ruled the World (Imagine That)" by Nas
21	11	"Crabs in a Barrel"	Hiro Murai	Stephen Glover	May 10, 2018	XAA02011	0.553
Earn and Van learn that Lottie is too smart for her school and is recommended to be sent to an expensive private school. While packing up for a European tour headlined by County, Darius informs Earn that his passport is expired. They go to a Jewish neighborhood to get it renewed, where Earn has a discussion with a man about why black people cannot have the same success others do in the management industry, which the man says is because of "systemic reasons." At the airport, Earn realizes he left Willy's gun in his bag, and subtly drops it in County's before security can catch it. On the plane, Al tells Earn that he saw what he did and tells him that he is the only one who truly understands him, and that they have to stick together because they are family. County gets on the plane, claiming that Lucas got caught with a gun in his bag. Tracy, unaware that Al has left for Europe, hammers on his door late at night to the annoyance of the woman he is with and Al's neighbors. The episode addresses the Jewish lawyer stereotype and institutional racism against black lawyers. Opening song: "Walk in the Way" by Ray Barnette & Larry Hall Closing song: "I Shall Be Released" by Nina Simone

== Production ==
=== Development ===
The series was renewed for a second season in September 2016. For the season, it carried the title "Robbin' Season". Executive producer Stephen Glover explained that the name comes from "a time in Atlanta right before Christmastime and New Year's. Basically, a bunch of crime happens in the city right during that time."

=== Writing ===
Donald Glover said that the season's structure was inspired by Tiny Toon Adventures: How I Spent My Vacation, which was "broken up into eight or nine episodes but when watched together, they played like a movie. You enjoy them more when they're together."

Stephen Glover said that the season would explore more about the city, "We get to see daily slices of people's lives and what makes living in a city like Atlanta a weird kind of experience. Atlanta is very weird, because it's a super-black town, but at the same time, there's other cultures there, there's history there. There's all these things that make it unique. I think you'll get to hopefully get immersed in what it is to live in that place on a daily basis, or to meet some of the people that you would meet."

=== Casting ===
Chris Rock contacted Stephen Glover and gave him a piece of advice saying, "Everybody is going to want to be on this show. Don't let anyone be on it. When people like me start asking you to be on it, that's when you don't let them be on it."

== Release ==
=== Broadcast ===
Due to Glover's acting commitment to Solo: A Star Wars Story, the season was delayed until 2018. In January 2018, FX confirmed that the season would premiere on March 1, 2018.

The sixth episode, "Teddy Perkins", aired commercial-free. Collider said that the decision to run the episode commercial-free aided the episode's message of "being trapped", a theme also explored in other episodes of Atlanta's second season.

=== Marketing ===
On February 13, 2018, the official trailer for the season was released.

=== Home media release ===
The season was released on DVD on December 17, 2019.

== Reception ==
=== Ratings ===
Viewership and ratings per episode of Atlanta season 2
No.	Title	Air date	Rating (18–49)	Viewers (millions)	DVR (18–49)	DVR viewers (millions)	Total (18–49)	Total viewers (millions)
1	"Alligator Man"	March 1, 2018	0.4	0.851	0.7	1.11	1.1	1.97
2	"Sportin' Waves"	March 8, 2018	0.4	0.714	0.5	0.90	0.9	1.61
3	"Money Bag Shawty"	March 15, 2018	0.3	0.561	0.5	0.85	0.8	1.41
4	"Helen"	March 22, 2018	0.3	0.499	0.4	0.75	0.7	1.25
5	"Barbershop"	March 29, 2018	0.3	0.607	0.5	0.78	0.8	1.39
6	"Teddy Perkins"	April 5, 2018	0.4	0.776	0.6	0.99	1.0	1.77
7	"Champagne Papi"	April 12, 2018	0.4	0.694	0.4	0.76	0.8	1.45
8	"Woods"	April 19, 2018	0.3	0.595	—N/a	—N/a	—N/a	—N/a
9	"North of the Border"	April 26, 2018	0.2	0.487	0.5	0.71	0.7	1.20
10	"FUBU"	May 3, 2018	0.4	0.694	—N/a	—N/a	—N/a	—N/a
11	"Crabs in a Barrel"	May 10, 2018	0.3	0.553	—N/a	—N/a	—N/a	—N/a

=== Critical reception ===
Atlanta season 2: Critical reception by episode
Atlanta season 2 (2018): Percentage of positive critics' reviews tracked by the website Rotten Tomatoes

The second season received critical acclaim. On Rotten Tomatoes, it has an approval rating of 98%, based on 212 reviews, with an average rating of 9.1/10. The site's critical consensus reads, "Donald Glover continues to subvert expectations with a sophomore season of Atlanta that proves as excellent as it is eccentric." On Metacritic, the second season has a score of 97 out of 100, based on 28 critics, indicating "universal acclaim".

After the season ended, Alan Sepinwall of Uproxx deemed the season as an improvement over the previous season, writing "on the whole, the Glovers, Hiro Murai, and everyone else involved in this remarkable program did exactly what they seemed to be doing at the start: following a basic narrative about Earn and Al's partnership from beginning to end." Emily St. James of Vox named it the best series of the year, writing "It's exactly the sort of thing TV is great at but that the medium does too rarely. It feels bigger than itself, with every episode spinning off into new tangents and chasing down additional rabbit trails."

==== Critics' top ten lists ====
The season topped many "Best of 2018" lists and was the second most mentioned series of the year.

2018
- No. 1 Complex
- No. 1 Entertainment Weekly
- No. 1 Esquire
- No. 1 Film School Rejects
- No. 1 Paste
- No. 1 RogerEbert.com
- No. 1 Rolling Stone
- No. 1 Slant Magazine
- No. 1 TV Guide
- No. 1 Uproxx
- No. 1 Vox
- No. 2 Adweek
- No. 2 Consequence
- No. 2 The Hollywood Reporter
- No. 2 IndieWire
- No. 3 Collider
- No. 3 The Ringer
- No. 3 Time
- No. 3 TVLine
- No. 3 Vanity Fair
- No. 4 Newsday
- No. 4 San Francisco Chronicle
- No. 5 The Daily Beast
- No. 6 Variety
- No. 9 The Guardian
- – IGN
- – The New York Times

=== Awards and nominations ===
Award	Category	Nominees	Result	Ref.
American Cinema Editors Awards	Best Edited Comedy Series for Commercial Television	Isaac Hagy (for "Alligator Man")	Nominated	
American Cinema Editors Awards	Best Edited Comedy Series for Commercial Television	Kyle Reiter (for "Teddy Perkins")	Won	
American Film Institute Awards	Top 10 TV Programs of the Year	Atlanta	Won	
Critics' Choice Television Awards	Best Comedy Series	Atlanta	Nominated	
Critics' Choice Television Awards	Best Actor in a Comedy Series	Donald Glover	Nominated	
Golden Globe Awards	Best Actor in a Television Series - Musical or Comedy	Donald Glover	Nominated	
People's Choice Awards	The Comedy TV Star of 2018	Donald Glover	Nominated	
Primetime Emmy Awards	Outstanding Comedy Series	Atlanta	Nominated	
Primetime Emmy Awards	Outstanding Lead Actor in a Comedy Series	Donald Glover	Nominated	
Primetime Emmy Awards	Outstanding Supporting Actor in a Comedy Series	Brian Tyree Henry	Nominated	
Primetime Emmy Awards	Outstanding Supporting Actress in a Comedy Series	Zazie Beetz	Nominated	
Primetime Emmy Awards	Outstanding Guest Actor in a Comedy Series	Katt Williams	Won	
Primetime Emmy Awards	Outstanding Directing for a Comedy Series	Donald Glover (for "FUBU")	Nominated	
Primetime Emmy Awards	Outstanding Directing for a Comedy Series	Hiro Murai (for "Teddy Perkins")	Nominated	
Primetime Emmy Awards	Outstanding Writing for a Comedy Series	Donald Glover (for "Alligator Man")	Nominated	
Primetime Emmy Awards	Outstanding Writing for a Comedy Series	Stefani Robinson (for "Barbershop")	Nominated	
Primetime Emmy Awards	Outstanding Casting for a Comedy Series	Alexa L. Fogel, Tara Feldstein Bennett, Chase Paris	Nominated	
Primetime Emmy Awards	Outstanding Cinematography for a Single-Camera Series (Half-Hour)	Christian Sprenger (for "Teddy Perkins")	Won	
Primetime Emmy Awards	Outstanding Music Supervision	Jen Malone and Fam Udeorji (for "Alligator Man")	Nominated	
Primetime Emmy Awards	Outstanding Production Design for a Narrative Program (Half-Hour or Less)	Timothy O'Brien, Taylor Mosbey, Aimee Athnos (for "Teddy Perkins")	Nominated	
Primetime Emmy Awards	Outstanding Single-Camera Picture Editing for a Comedy Series	Isaac Hagy (for "Alligator Man")	Nominated	
Primetime Emmy Awards	Outstanding Single-Camera Picture Editing for a Comedy Series	Kyle Reiter (for "Teddy Perkins")	Nominated	
Primetime Emmy Awards	Outstanding Sound Editing for a Comedy or Drama Series (Half-Hour) and Animation	Trevor Gates, Jason Dotts, David Barbee, Jordan McClain, Tara Blume, Matt Salib (for "Teddy Perkins")	Won	
Satellite Awards	Best Comedy Series	Atlanta	Nominated	
Satellite Awards	Best Actor in a Comedy Series	Donald Glover	Nominated	
Screen Actors Guild Awards	Outstanding Performance by an Ensemble in a Comedy Series	Khris Davis, Donald Glover, Brian Tyree Henry, and Lakeith Stanfield	Nominated	
TCA Awards	Program of the Year	Atlanta	Nominated	
TCA Awards	Outstanding Achievement in Comedy	Atlanta	Nominated	
TCA Awards	Individual Achievement in Comedy	Donald Glover	Nominated	
Writers Guild of America Awards	Comedy Series	Ibra Ake, Donald Glover, Stephen Glover, Taofik Kolade, Jamal Olori, Stefani Robinson, Paul Simms	Nominated	
