= North of the Border =

North of the Border may refer to:

- North of the Border (film), a 1946 film by B. Reeves Eason
- "North of the Borer" (Atlanta), 2018 TV episode

== See also ==
- South of the Border (disambiguation)
