= Woods (Atlanta) =

- Atlanta episode
- Episode no.: Season 2 Episode 8
- Directed by: Hiro Murai
- Written by: Stefani Robinson
- Cinematography by: Christian Sprenger
- Editing by: Isaac Hagy
- Production code: XAA02008
- Original air date: April 19, 2018
- Running time: 27 minutes

Guest appearances
- Angela Wildflower as Sierra; Reggie Green as Wiley

Episode chronology
← Previous "Champagne Papi"	Next → "North of the Border"
- Atlanta season 2

"Woods" is the eighth episode of the second season of the American comedy-drama television series Atlanta. It is the 18th overall episode of the series and was written by producer Stefani Robinson, and directed by co-executive producer Hiro Murai. It was first broadcast on FX in the United States on April 19, 2018.

The series is set in Atlanta and follows Earnest "Earn" Marks, as he tries to redeem himself in the eyes of his ex-girlfriend Van, who is also the mother of his daughter Lottie; as well as his parents and his cousin Alfred, who raps under the stage name "Paper Boi"; and Darius, Alfred's eccentric right-hand man. In the episode, Alfred goes out with a female friend but he decides to abandon her when she questions his "real" persona. While going home on his own, he is mugged by three fans, forcing him to flee into the woods.

According to Nielsen Media Research, the episode was seen by an estimated 0.595 million household viewers and gained a 0.3 ratings share among adults aged 18–49. The episode was praised by critics for Brian Tyree Henry's performance, Murai's directing, and its cinematography, character development and emotional weight. For his performance in the episode, Henry received an Outstanding Supporting Actor in a Comedy Series nomination at the 70th Primetime Emmy Awards.

== Plot ==
Alfred (Brian Tyree Henry) is half-asleep at his couch, where he imagines hearing his mother berating him for his room before she disappears. He later wakes up when Earn (Donald Glover) calls him to get him to sign a few forms. Then, Darius (Lakeith Stanfield) arrives to prepare pasta. Alfred then decides to leave with his friend, Sierra (Angela Wildflower), who picks him up in her car.

While shopping, Alfred tells Sierra that while Earn is his manager, he hasn't given him much benefits or "free" stuff. They then go to a nail salon, where Sierra expresses her concerns about her Instagram content, something Alfred is not fond of as he considers it "fake". She suggests they could have a fake relationship to boost their popularity, something that Alfred refuses. When Sierra takes a photo of both of them, Alfred tells her to delete it, and Sierra calls him out for saying his popularity does not make him "real". An angry Alfred leaves the salon and decides to walk home.

As he walks, he runs into three young men, all who claim to be fans of his work. Suddenly, they decide to mug him when they find that he is alone. Alfred fights back but is hurt in the process, losing his watch and necklace and two of them flee. The one remaining starts shooting with a gun, prompting Alfred to escape through the woods. The man's foot steps stop but Alfred feels lost in the woods. As he tries to wander through the woods, he finds himself taunted by an apparently mentally unstable man named Wiley (Reggie Green), who does not seem to help him in anything.

As the night falls, Alfred remains lost and is now nicknamed "deer guts" by Wiley after he stumbles on a dead deer. Tired, Alfred decides to sit near a log, where Wiley compares him to Alfred's mother, calling him out on insulting people and telling him to start thinking how to escape. Wiley then pulls out a knife, telling Alfred to stand up and find a way out of the woods or he will rob him. He then gives him to the count of 30 to run away or he will kill him, prompting him to flee. Suddenly, Alfred finds himself out of the woods and in front of a BP gas station, where he breaks down. He then enters the convenience store to tend his wounds. There, he is approached by a timid fan and Alfred offers him to take selfies, despite his distaste of them. He willingly takes pictures, telling the fan "be safe out here" before leaving.

== Production ==
=== Development ===
"Why Paper Boi always got an attitude? He rich, right? That's why I can't feel bad for these celebrities."

— Official description in the press release for the episode.

In March 2018, FX announced that the eighth episode of the season would be titled "Woods" and that it would be written by producer Stefani Robinson, and directed by co-executive producer Hiro Murai. This was Robinson's fourth writing credit, and Murai's twelfth directing credit.

The episode's credits start with the words "In loving memory of Willow Dean Kearse", actor Brian Tyree Henry's mother, who died in 2016.

=== Writing ===
Stefani Robinson stated that Alfred's actions in the episode are a continuation of his role in the episode "Sportin' Waves, saying "The universe is trying to tell him something, God is trying to tell him something. So we see it again but more violent and scarier. He ignored the first warning and the second came harder and faster and spoke to him in a way where he was more able to look at the situation and make a decision about his life." She viewed his story in the episode (particularly during the woods) as a metaphor for the Hero's journey. According to Robinson, the ending of the episode is meant to indicate that Alfred is not "regular" anymore.

Henry's mother's death was a huge influence on the episode, with Robinson saying "I think that was sort of one of the bigger thematic things that jumped out to Brian and I think he connected with the script obviously not a technical level but on a very emotional and personal level." Henry commented on filming the episode, "It stuck with me, and it's really hard to watch, but I'm glad that I committed to it. I'm glad that Hiro guided that and moved that the way he did, and it came out in a way that I still can't believe. But it wasn't that easy to do." For the episode, Henry asked that he couldn't see the woman who played Alfred's mother in the episode.

== Reception ==
=== Viewers ===
The episode was watched by 0.595 million viewers, earning a 0.3 in the 18-49 rating demographics on the Nielson ratings scale. This means that 0.3 percent of all households with televisions watched the episode. This was a 15% decrease from the previous episode, which was watched by 0.694 million viewers with a 0.4 in the 18-49 demographics.

=== Critical reviews ===
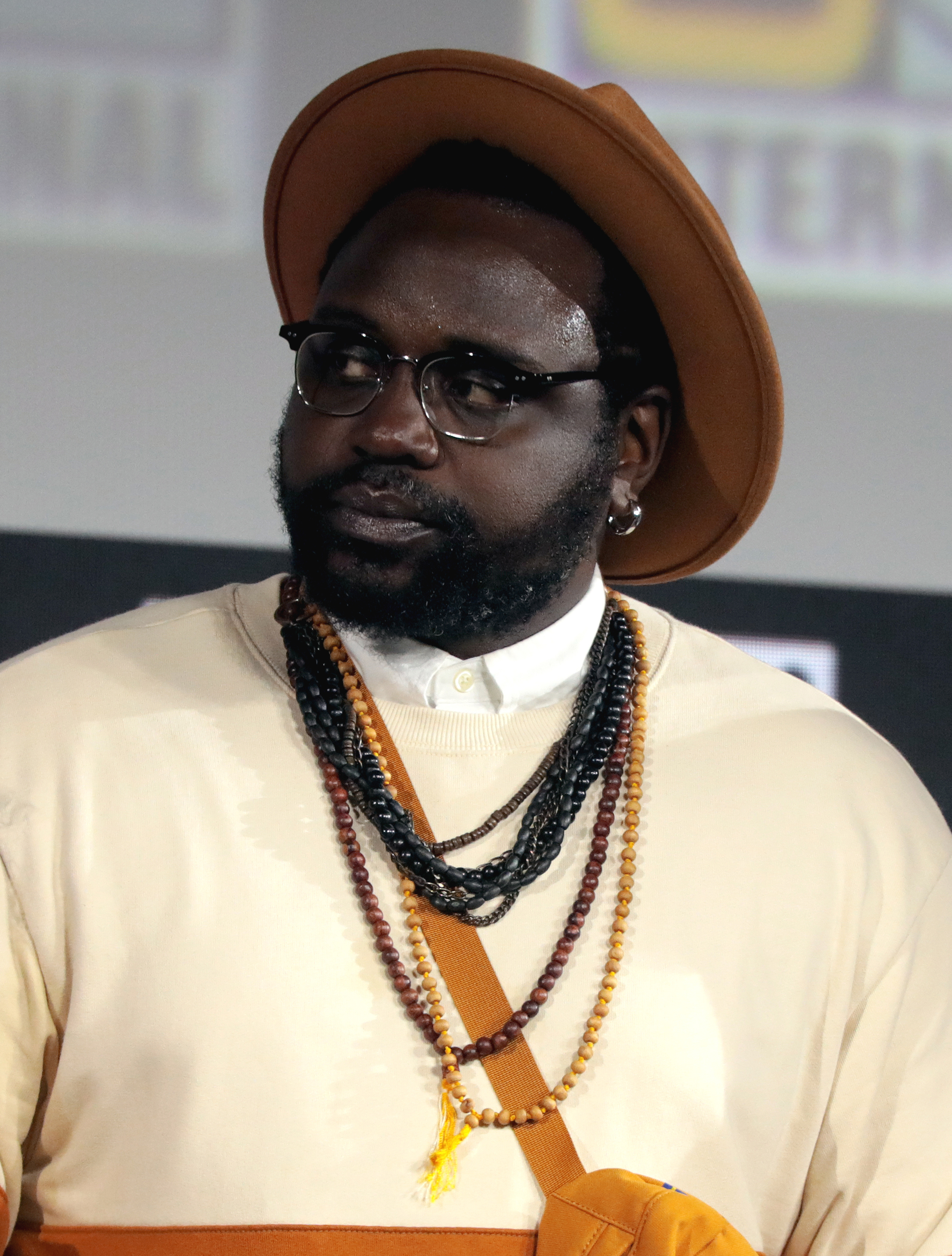
Brian Tyree Henry's performance in the episode received universal acclaim from critics. He later would submit the episode for his Outstanding Supporting Actor in a Comedy Series nomination at the 70th Primetime Emmy Awards.

The review aggregator website Rotten Tomatoes reported a 100% approval rating for the episode, based on 10 reviews, with an average rating of 9.7/10.

Joshua Alston of The A.V. Club gave the episode an "A" and wrote, "What makes this show challenging is how it forces you to consider and reconsider the truth and consequence of everything that takes place. That said, it's tough to imagine that Atlanta's latest hard left into full-on horror won't have lasting consequences for the characters. At the very least, there's a potent message for Alfred in 'Woods', a rare example of an Atlanta episode that puts a clear, fine point on its off-kilter plot."

Alan Sepinwall of Uproxx wrote, "I've given up trying to outguess this show, other than assuming each week will give me something to love. 'Woods' didn't disappoint in that area." Matt Miller of Esquire wrote, "In two solo episodes, Henry has officially defined himself as one of the next breakout stars of Atlanta. With Glover gracefully handing the lead role to his co-stars, he's given them a chance to prove that they're much more than supporting actors. And maybe during the next awards season we'll see Henry's (or Lakeith Stanfield's, or Zazie Beetz's) name among the nominations." Bryan Washington of Vulture gave the episode a perfect five out of five and wrote, "As a character investigation of a guy caught up in the nether region between fame and life as a pedestrian, the episode is masterful, even despite its more problematic bits. It's the final precipice of a man before he falls into the rest of his life. By the time the credits roll, we've seen Al lean over the edge, his mounting existential terror, and the eventual descent."

Leigh-Anne Jackson of The New York Times wrote, "Whatever the true nature of this unsettling sylvan scene, it was enough to make Al see the light. All this time, he's been on the fence about whether or not he wants this fame of his." Jacob Oller of Paste gave the episode an 8.6 out of 10 rating and wrote, "It's a delicate tightrope between utter cynicism and utter earnestness, as the philosophy of how one should manage one's public persona and fanbase is a topic of interest for the series' creator and its stars." Justin Charity of The Ringer wrote, "The slow, luxurious pacing of Atlanta saps conventional urgency from Paper Boi's arc, but now comes the reckoning. Here, he must survive a trial in solitude."
