= Sportin' Waves =

- Atlanta episode
- Episode no.: Season 2 Episode 2
- Directed by: Hiro Murai
- Written by: Stephen Glover
- Cinematography by: Christian Sprenger
- Editing by: Kyle Reiter
- Production code: XAA02002
- Original air date: March 8, 2018
- Running time: 23 minutes

Guest appearances
- RJ Walker as Clark County; Khris Davis as Tracy

Episode chronology
← Previous "Alligator Man"	Next → "Money Bag Shawty"
- Atlanta season 2

"Sportin' Waves" is the second episode of the second season of the American comedy-drama television series Atlanta. It is the 12th overall episode of the series and was written by executive producer Stephen Glover, and directed by co-executive producer Hiro Murai. It was first broadcast on FX in the United States on March 8, 2018.

The series is set in Atlanta and follows Earnest "Earn" Marks, as he tries to redeem himself in the eyes of his ex-girlfriend Van, who is also the mother of his daughter Lottie; as well as his parents and his cousin Alfred, who raps under the stage name "Paper Boi"; and Darius, Alfred's eccentric right-hand man. In the episode, Earn and Alfred fail at making a deal with a music service when the staff's methods conflict with their interests. Earn goes with Tracy to double some of his profits, while Alfred tries to find a new drug dealer when he is robbed.

According to Nielsen Media Research, the episode was seen by an estimated 0.714 million household viewers and gained a 0.4 ratings share among adults aged 18–49. The episode received critical acclaim, with critics praising the writing, comedic elements, performances, music and themes.

== Plot ==
At night, Alfred (Brian Tyree Henry) meets with his drug dealer in the dealer's car, having recently ended his house arrest. However, the dealer suddenly pulls out a weapon and robs Alfred, also taking away his car keys so he doesn't follow him. As Alfred leaves walking, the dealer tries to apologize but Alfred brushes him off.

The next day, Alfred and Earn (Donald Glover) meet with the executives of a music start-up company. The company functions differently than they expected, as they prefer to use digital media instead of disk drives. Alfred feels unsatisfied with the company and lazily performs his duties. Earn notes that nearly all of the all-white staff of the company is staring at them. He and Earn then meet one of the company's clients, a rapper named Clark County (RJ Walker). During a live performance at the company's offices, Alfred gives up when the crowd feels indifferent to his performance and he and Earn leave the offices.

Back at Alfred's house, Darius (Lakeith Stanfield) gives Earn his share of the dog breeding operation, earning $4,000. Tracy (Khris Davis) overhears this and offers to double the money on a gift card. Earn accompanies Tracy to the mall for the gift card, but they first stop at a shoe store as Tracy has a job interview. At the store, Tracy admires some shoes and then confides in Earn that the store has a "no chase" policy, intending to run away with the shoes without paying. As a clerk sees him, Tracy takes the shoes and calmly walks away from the store without anyone following him.

Needing a new dealer, Alfred meets with Darius's dealer, although the fact that he posts pictures of him on Instagram prompts him to brush him off. They meet another dealer, who sells him marijuana for a reasonable price and quality. However, the dealer sends Alfred a video of his girlfriend performing an acoustic cover of "Paper Boi", which annoys him. When the dealer puts Alfred on a group chat with his girlfriend, Alfred drops his phone in the street.

Back in the mall, Earn uses the gift card to pay for some shoes. However, Tracy texts him, warning that he has a limited time to buy stuff with the card as it was fraudulently used. After buying a few things, Earn is dismayed to see that Tracy abandoned him in the mall for his job interview, forcing him to take the bus back to Alfred's house. At the house, they watch a commercial by Clark County, with Alfred hating it but Earn actually liking it. At his job interview, Tracy is told that while they are impressed with him, they have no position for him at the company. Tracy then furiously leaves, accusing the interviewer and the company of racism.

== Production ==
=== Development ===
"Trappin ain't easy, ya dig? Shout out to all my credit card scammers in the club tonight."

— Official description in the press release for the episode.

In February 2018, FX announced that the second episode of the season would be titled "Sportin' Waves" and that it would be written by executive producer Stephen Glover, and directed by co-executive producer Hiro Murai. This was Stephen Glover's fifth writing credit, and Murai's ninth directing credit.

=== Music ===
The acoustic cover of "Paper Boi" that appears in one scene and plays during the credits is performed by Bryce Hitchcock, a YouTube cover artist. She auditioned for the part, aware of the episode's mockery of the Acoustic cover, explaining "part of the process was finding a way to make Paper Boi's song my own thing. I found more acoustic-y chords to go under it and found a different flow, almost jazzy in some places." One of the series' writers, Jamal Olori, said "We've had a running joke for years about popular songs that were initially trap and extremely gutta, and they get really mainstream", comparing it to Niykee Heaton covering Chief Keef's "Love Sosa".

== Reception ==
=== Viewers ===
The episode was watched by 0.714 million viewers, earning a 0.4 in the 18-49 rating demographics on the Nielson ratings scale. This means that 0.4 percent of all households with televisions watched the episode. This was a 17% decrease from the previous episode, which was watched by 0.851 million viewers with a 0.4 in the 18-49 demographics.

With DVR factored, the episode was watched by 1.61 million viewers with a 0.9 in the 18-49 demographics.

=== Critical reviews ===
"Sportin' Waves" received critical acclaim. The review aggregator website Rotten Tomatoes reported a 100% approval rating for the episode, based on 11 reviews, with an average rating of 9/10.

Joshua Alston of The A.V. Club gave the episode an "A−" and wrote, "To a certain extent, Atlanta is just a show about a guy who could probably be a lot more successful if he was just a bit choosier about the company he keeps. I've never winced harder watching this show than I did when Earn gladly hand $4,000 to a recently released prisoner who promised him a 100 percent return on a mall gift card. That's literally the shadiest thing I've ever heard of, and it's a pretty potent illustration of why Earn is still referred to as 'the cousin' more often than 'the manager'. He has some drive, some smarts, some people skills, some judgment, but he doesn't have a surplus of anything."

Alan Sepinwall of Uproxx wrote, "In not much time, Tracy's proven to be a fine addition to the group, even if he's cutting into the amount of Darius a bit. 'Sportin’ Waves' didn't have anything quite as surprising as the premiere's fast food robbery or alligator saunter, but it's one of the series’ most consistent — and consistently funny — installments yet." Matt Miller of Esquire wrote, "Donald Glover has often said that the purpose of Atlanta is to 'show people what it's like to be black'. And this week, he's offered his white audience a mirror to view their own reflection — albeit one that they might see through a different lens than they're used to." Bryan Washington of Vulture gave the episode a 4 star rating out of 5 and wrote, "Paper Boi isn't the only one having a hard time performing: Earn is starting to realize that a manager's shoes might be too big for his feet, while Tracy spends the episode prepping for a job interview. Everyone's on stage, but no one's really enjoying it, and 'Sportin’ Waves' is a master class on the forces underlying those performances: code-switching and authenticity — or the lack thereof."

Leigh-Anne Jackson of The New York Times wrote, "Tracy's wave cap expertise is where the episode gets its name, 'Sportin’ Waves'. Watching these guys sit around sharing laughs and potshots about a hair care phenomenon that's pretty unique to black men — without expounding on its nuances for the benefit of a wider audience — felt like witnessing a secret handshake." Jacob Oller of Paste gave the episode a 9.0 out of 10 rating and wrote, "Atlanta's been riding the wave of bleak comedy for a season and change now, which has allowed its cast and crew to perfect their balance of incredulity and deadpan into an episode like 'Sportin’ Waves'. This is an episode where Earn functions as an outsider sucked into various bubbles while his cousin Alfred, a.k.a Paper Boi, has his familiar bubbles burst. That's because 'Robbin’ Season' is in full swing and everyone gotta eat." Justin Charity of The Ringer wrote, "Apart from the streaming hustle, the rest of the episode, titled 'Sportin’ Waves', invokes Paper Boi's music career only obliquely, as fans badger him with recognition, praise, and photography. 'Sportin’ Waves' is one of the few Atlanta episodes to belabor a single theme — humiliation—with each scene, though the corporate comedy interlude is bookended by much humbler story lines."
