= Teddy Perkins =

- Atlanta episode
- Teddy Perkins, played by series creator Donald Glover, threatens Darius with a gun.
- Episode no.: Season 2 Episode 6
- Directed by: Hiro Murai
- Written by: Donald Glover
- Production code: XAA02006
- Original air date: April 5, 2018
- Running time: 34 minutes

Guest appearances
- Khris Davis as Tracy; Chris Jarell as Young Benny

Episode chronology
← Previous "Barbershop"	Next → "Champagne Papi"
- Atlanta season 2

"Teddy Perkins" is the sixth episode of the second season of the American comedy-drama television series Atlanta, and the sixteenth episode of the series overall. It was originally broadcast on FX in the United States on April 5, 2018. The episode features series regular Darius Epps visiting a mansion to pick up a free piano, where he encounters a strange man named Teddy Perkins. Against the phone advice of Alfred, Darius continues his attempt to leave with the piano, and discovers that Perkins intends to turn the mansion into a museum.

In a deviation from the typical comedic structure of Atlanta, series creator Donald Glover wrote the episode and played the titular Teddy Perkins character with more of a dramatic/horror bent. Hiro Murai directed the episode, his eleventh directorial credit for Atlanta. The episode is longer than a typical Atlanta episode, running 34 minutes. In its initial airing, the episode was shown by FX with no commercial breaks.

The episode was praised, with some critics lauding it as one of the show's most innovative episodes. It received 776,000 viewers in its initial airing, and 1.77 million viewers in total with DVR viewership.

== Plot ==
"Darius is trippin in this one. Y'all know I woulda been left."

— Official description in the press release for the episode.

Darius (LaKeith Stanfield) answers a message board advertisement for a valuable piano owned by a famous musician named Benny Hope. This leads him to a mansion owned by a pale, idiosyncratic man with a mask-like face named Theodore "Teddy" Perkins (Donald Glover). Teddy exhibits strange and unsettling behavior during their conversations. He claims that Benny is his brother, whom he watches over. Teddy will not let Darius meet Benny, as he uses a wheelchair and has a skin condition that makes him extremely photosensitive.

After exploring some of the mansion, Darius calls Alfred (Brian Tyree Henry) who urges him to be direct and leave as soon as possible. Darius hypothesizes that the man he has been dealing with is actually Benny, and uses the persona of Teddy to cope with his dwindling career and physical condition. Teddy then shows Darius the mansion's gift shop and informs him that he is turning the mansion into a museum and historical site. Teddy also claims that he and Benny were physically abused by their father in his desire to make the two of them musical prodigies.

Darius is eventually granted the piano and attempts to leave via the elevator. A malfunction takes him to the mansion's basement where he encounters a man in a wheelchair, dark sunglasses and heavy bandages, presumed to be Benny (Derrick Haywood). Benny, unable to speak due to the bandages covering his face, warns Darius by writing on a small chalkboard that "Teddy [will] kill us both" and that he should retrieve a gun located in the attic. Darius, believing that Benny is actually Teddy in a disguise, ignores this and attempts to leave with the piano immediately. Reaching the porch, he discovers that Teddy is blocking the loading bay of Darius's rental truck with his car. Darius returns to the house to ask Teddy to move the vehicle.

For protection, Darius picks up a wrought-iron fireplace poker and locates Teddy upstairs by following the vague sound of light piano. He enters a large study and discovers Teddy, alone, watching a home movie of his father giving Benny a piano lesson. Darius, unnerved, asks for the restroom. Teddy mentions that the restroom is up the stairs further, near the attic, before revealing a large double-barreled shotgun, claiming to have found it in the attic.

Teddy holds Darius at gunpoint, and states that Darius will be his "sacrifice." He marches Darius down to the foyer and forces him to handcuff himself, and reveals his plan to kill Darius and stage the scene like a home invasion by an "obsessed" fan in order to increase interest in his planned museum. As Teddy sets down his shotgun, Darius unsuccessfully attempts to dissuade Teddy from following through with his plan by sympathizing with his past, revealing that he too had an abusive father.

Despite Darius's effort, Teddy prepares to go ahead with his plan. The elevator door opens. To both men's surprise, the injured Benny exits the elevator and enters the room, revealing that Teddy was telling the truth about Benny: he exists. Benny picks up Teddy's discarded shotgun as Teddy exclaims "Benny, you're alive." As Benny lifts the gun, a bloody wound can be seen on his abdomen, implying that Teddy may have attempted to kill his brother, and that his ultimate plan was to frame Darius for his murder.

Benny shoots Teddy dead before using the fireplace poker he takes from Darius to pull the trigger, shooting himself in the head. The police arrive and haul off the corpses, along with the piano as crime scene evidence as a visibly disturbed Darius drives away empty-handed in his U-Haul truck.

== Production ==
Teddy Perkins
- Atlanta character
- First appearance: "Teddy Perkins"; Atlanta; April 5, 2018
- Last appearance: 70th Primetime Emmy Awards; September 18, 2018
- Created by: Donald Glover; Hiro Murai
- Portrayed by: Donald Glover (uncredited); Jay Pharoah (Emmy Awards)

In-universe information
- Full name: Theodore Perkins
- Nickname: Teddy
- Occupation: Caregiver
- Family: Benny Hope (brother); Unnamed father
- Nationality: African-American (bleached)

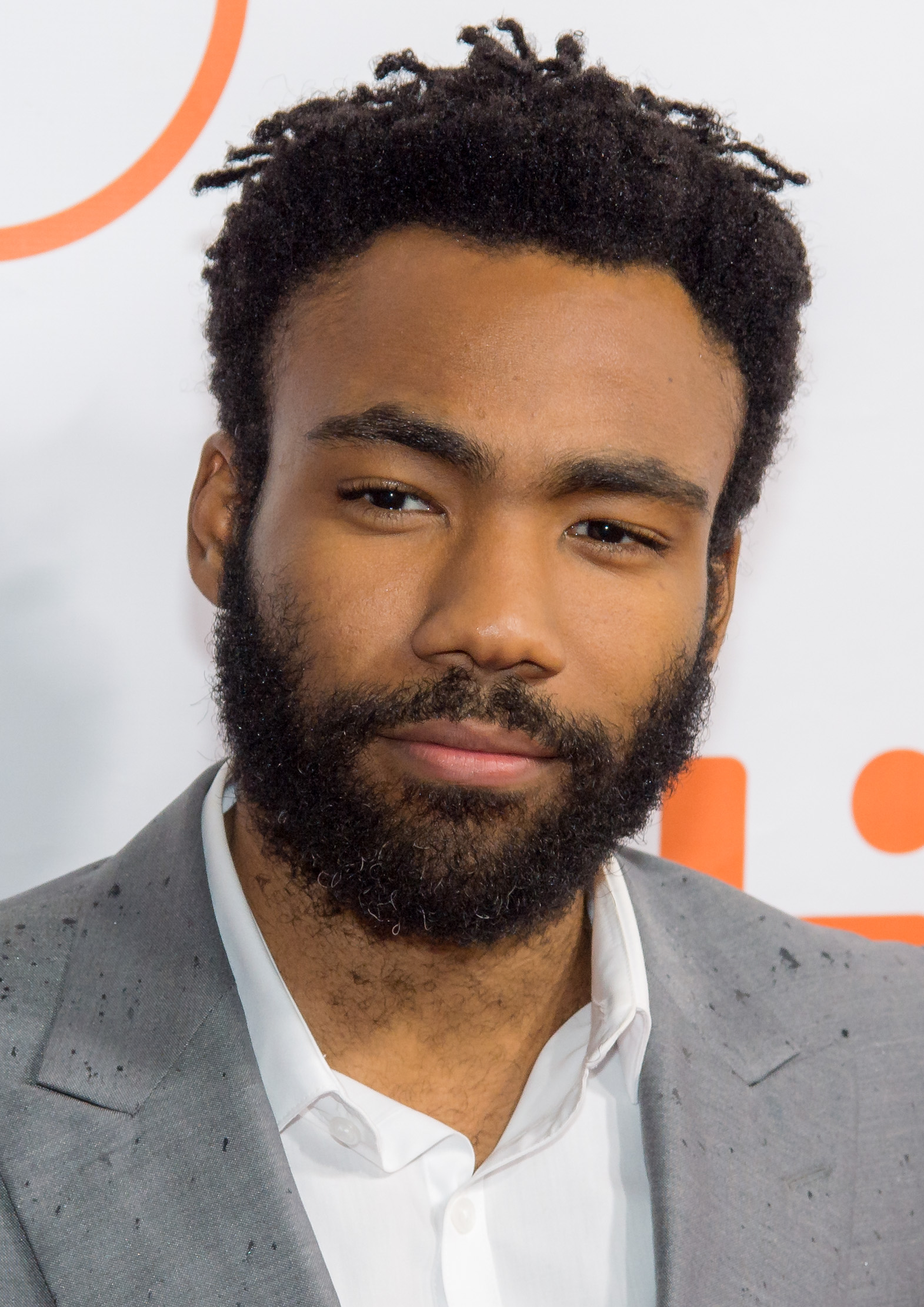
Atlanta creator and star Donald Glover played Teddy Perkins in prosthetics.

The titular Teddy Perkins was portrayed by series star Donald Glover, who performed the role in whiteface. In addition to Glover's starring credit, the end credits list "Teddy Perkins as himself". Teddy's brother, Benny Hope, was played by Derrick Haywood, who had previously played a small role as a bartender in the first season of Atlanta. Haywood called playing the character "an amazing experience". Haywood received a similar makeup and prosthetic treatment as Glover for the character, as the two were supposed to be brothers with the same skin condition.

In an episode which deviated from the typical comedic structure of Atlanta, Glover stayed in whiteface throughout the entire filming. The crew referred to Glover as "Teddy" on-set, and Haywood did not know of Glover's true identity, saying that there was "no Donald on set whatsoever". Some outlets compared the titular Teddy Perkins character to Michael Jackson. Atlanta writer Stefani Robinson commented that while it was "undeniable that there are references to Michael Jackson and the idea of someone changing themselves within the industry", she saw the parallels as "more of a symbolic reference to the industry maybe and what you do for greatness, or what one will do to be perceived as great".

Director Hiro Murai said that looking into Glover's face when he played the role was "like looking into a doll's face", and called it "uncanny and unsettling". He recalled a "general sense of unease on set because the cast and crew didn't know how to behave around him". Murai and cinematographer Christian Sprenger were influenced by the work of Stanley Kubrick, particularly The Shining, when creating the episode.

In its initial airing on FX, "Teddy Perkins" aired commercial-free. It ran as an "extended" episode, at around 41 minutes. Collider said that the decision to run the episode commercial-free aided the episode's message of "being trapped", a theme also explored in other episodes of Atlanta's second season. The pre-release description for the episode read, "Darius is trippin in this one. Y'all know I woulda been left." The episode was shot at a real mansion in a suburb of Atlanta. "Evil" by Stevie Wonder plays over the episode's end credits, and Wonder's music is also used to open the episode, in addition to being referenced by characters in the episode. Glover had to personally request clearance from Wonder as he did not want his music accompanying violence.

== Reception ==
"Teddy Perkins" was lauded by critics, and is considered one of the most innovative episodes in Atlanta's short history. Dee Lockett of Vulture said that "Teddy Perkins" will "likely go down as one of the wildest episodes of Atlanta – and television, in general – to ever air". Jim Poe of Junkee called it "the best piece of television that's aired this year". Complex's Khris Davenport compared the episode's dark and unnerving tone to the social thriller film Get Out, as did Vulture and IndieWire. Brian Richards of Pajiba said that his "stomach tied itself into every imaginable knot" while watching the episode. Uproxx called the episode a "horrific acid trip" that "brings the idea of destroyed heroes to a grisly conclusion", also calling it an "incredible episode of television". Gold Derby offered high praise for Lakeith Stanfield's performance, particularly praising the "freedom" the episode allowing Stanfield to show his range.

The character of Teddy Perkins, and Glover's portrayal of him, was praised by critics. Junkee wrote that "Glover's frighteningly inhuman make-up is an eerie metaphor for the destructive effects of American racism". The Huffington Post called him a "tormented, broken man". Director Steven Soderbergh called the episode the "most beautifully photographed half hour of TV" he had ever seen, adding that it was "COMPLETELY BANANAS". The A.V. Club said that Atlanta has "never felt more dangerous" than in "Teddy Perkins". The New York Times praised the episode's deconstruction of classic horror movie tropes, while Junkee lauded it as a "self-contained psychological horror flick", noting themes of child abuse and toxic masculinity. IndieWire said that the episode "might have been the most horrific Atlanta episode to date", and said that the "sense of complacency and safety" from the previous week's more humorous "Barbershop" was "torn away". It also called the soft-boiled ostrich egg scene "perhaps one of the most disturbing sequences in the entire series".

"Teddy Perkins" was ranked #1 on Time's list of the "Top 10 Best TV Episodes of 2018". "Teddy Perkins" was also on The Washington Post's list of "The 10 Best TV Episodes of 2018". In 2024, Rolling Stone listed it as the 10th best TV episode of all time.

The episode received 0.776 million viewers in its initial airing, with a 0.4 rating in the 18–49 demographic. With DVR viewership, the ratings increased to 1.77 million viewers.

== Accolades ==
Award	Category	Nominee(s)	Result	Ref.
70th Primetime Emmy Awards	Outstanding Lead Actor in a Comedy Series	Donald Glover	Nominated	
70th Primetime Emmy Awards	Outstanding Directing for a Comedy Series	Hiro Murai	Nominated	
70th Primetime Creative Arts Emmy Awards	Outstanding Cinematography for a Single-Camera Series (Half-Hour)	Christian Sprenger	Won	
70th Primetime Creative Arts Emmy Awards	Outstanding Single-Camera Picture Editing for a Comedy Series	Kyle Reiter	Nominated	
70th Primetime Creative Arts Emmy Awards	Outstanding Production Design for a Narrative Program (Half-Hour or Less)	Timothy O'Brien, Taylor Mosbey, Aimee Athnos	Nominated	
70th Primetime Creative Arts Emmy Awards	Outstanding Sound Editing for a Comedy or Drama Series (Half-Hour) and Animation	Trevor Gates, Jason Dotts, David Barbee, Jordan McClain, Geordy Sincavage, Michael S. Head, Tara Blume and Matt Salib	Won	

== See also ==
- List of television episodes listed among the best
