= North of the Border (Atlanta) =

- Atlanta episode
- Episode no.: Season 2 Episode 9
- Directed by: Hiro Murai
- Written by: Jamal Olori
- Cinematography by: Christian Sprenger
- Editing by: Kyle Reiter
- Production code: XAA02009
- Original air date: April 26, 2018
- Running time: 31 minutes

Guest appearances
- Khris Davis as Tracy; RJ Walker as Clark County

Episode chronology
← Previous "Woods"	Next → "FUBU"
- Atlanta season 2

"North of the Border" is the ninth episode of the second season of the American comedy-drama television series Atlanta. It is the 19th overall episode of the series and was written by Jamal Olori, and directed by executive producer Hiro Murai. It was first broadcast on FX in the United States on April 26, 2018.

The series is set in Atlanta and follows Earnest "Earn" Marks, as he tries to redeem himself in the eyes of his ex-girlfriend Van, who is also the mother of his daughter Lottie; as well as his parents and his cousin Alfred, who raps under the stage name "Paper Boi"; and Darius, Alfred's eccentric right-hand man. In the episode, Earn, Alfred, Darius and Tracy head to a college for a concert where Alfred is set to perform. Earn's attempts to avoid paying money soon gets them into trouble with the students, and Alfred questions if Earn is right for his job position.

According to Nielsen Media Research, the episode was seen by an estimated 0.487 million household viewers and gained a 0.2 ratings share among adults aged 18–49. The episode received critical acclaim, with critics praising Donald Glover's performance, writing, character development and directing.

== Plot ==
Earn (Donald Glover), Alfred (Brian Tyree Henry) and Darius (Lakeith Stanfield) are preparing to leave for Statesboro, where Alfred is set to perform at a college campus. Tracy (Khris Davis) suddenly shows up at the apartment and convinces them to let him accompany them, despite his probation. While preparing, Earn reveals they are not staying at a hotel, but with a fan of Alfred named Violet (Jerusha Cavazos), which seems to frustrate Alfred.

Once they arrive at Statesboro, they reach Violet's dorm, who is surprised by Tracy's unexpected presence but accommodates him. Violet invites Alfred to her bedroom where he will sleep with her, stating in detail that she has a crush on him. At the concert event, they run into Clark County (RJ Walker) and his manager Lucas (Matthew Barnes). Suddenly, Violet dumps beer on Alfred for talking with another girl, prompting an angry Tracy to confront her and push her down the stairs. Earn manages to catch her in time. Violet then slaps Earn and tells a group of students that they tried to touch her. The students corner Earn, Alfred and Darius. Tracy suddenly punches one of the students and the four flee, eventually managing to evade them.

They reach a frat house (mostly consisting of white boys) where the fraternity members give them marijuana and invite them to enter. The frat house is in the middle of a hazing ceremony, with pledges being stripped of their clothes and bags placed over their heads. The house also has many antique guns, donated by their alumnus in the NRA, and is proudly displaying a Confederate flag. The pledges are forced to dance to “Laffy Taffy”, with Tracy finding the entire situation humorous. Darius and Tracy leave to explore the house while Earn and Alfred stay in the main room. Alfred then tells Earn that he is responsible for all the bad decisions throughout the trip and that he has been talking with Lucas about possibly managing him, admitting to Earn that while he respects him as family, he is not a good manager.

The next morning, they leave the frat house to get their stuff from Violet's dorm. They find their car damaged and their belongings left around the grass or stolen. Earn finds that his laptop is missing and tries to enter Violet's dorm room, even going as far as to activate a fire alarm. As more students are watching them, they are forced to retreat and escape. While driving back, Tracy mocks Earn's actions and reveals that he stole a flintlock from the frat house, pretending to shoot Earn. Frustrated, Earn tells Alfred to pull the car over to fight with Tracy. Alfred does so, and despite Earn's determination, Tracy quickly beats him into submission while Alfred and Darius watch on. Alfred, Darius and Tracy get inside the car, while Earn takes a few moments to compose himself before entering. They continue driving, in silence.

== Production ==
=== Development ===
"We might have to make that move tonight. I heard there's a pajama party and Paper Boi is gonna be there."

— Official description in the press release for the episode.

In March 2018, FX announced that the ninth episode of the season would be titled "North of the Border" and that it would be written by Jamal Olori, and directed by executive producer Hiro Murai. This was Olori's second writing credit, and Murai's thirteenth directing credit. Starting with this episode, Murai is now credited as executive producer.

The silk pajamas Earn, Alfred and Darius wear throughout much of the episode bear a strong resemblance to those worn by TLC in the music video for "Creep".

=== Unedited version ===
Before the episode premiered, FX sent a warning to journalists.

Tonight's episode is rated TV-MA and contains nudity, violence and strong language. The frontal nudity will not appear in the version airing on the FX network linear telecast. The unedited version will air ONLY on FX+.

== Reception ==
=== Viewers ===
The episode was watched by 0.487 million viewers, earning a 0.2 in the 18-49 rating demographics on the Nielson ratings scale. This means that 0.2 percent of all households with televisions watched the episode. This was a 19% decrease from the previous episode, which was watched by 0.595 million viewers with a 0.3 in the 18-49 demographics.

With DVR factored, the episode was watched by 1.20 million viewers with a 0.7 in the 18-49 demographics.

=== Critical reviews ===
"North of the Border" received critical acclaim. The review aggregator website Rotten Tomatoes reported a 91% approval rating for the episode, based on 11 reviews, with an average rating of 8.8/10.

Joshua Alston of The A.V. Club gave the episode an "A−" and wrote, "Atlanta thrives on the ephemeral, but not everything we see exists in a vacuum. It's been long enough since 'Woods' that the only evidence of Al's trial is the bandage across the bridge of his nose. The next time we see Earn, his wounds will have begun to heal too. The question is how long it will take to mend his relationship with Al." Hanh Nguyen of IndieWire wrote, "With two more episodes left in the season, it remains to be seen if this experience will push him to finally see the world through a more realistic lens. Like Alfred, who had an epiphany in the woods last week, perhaps this will help put the 'Earn' in 'learn' for our hero. Then again, this is the same guy who said in the pilot that he can't win for losing. He very well could follow the trajectory of another tragic hero, Oedipus, who after fulfilling his grim prophecy, stabs himself in the eyes, bringing his blindness full circle."

Alan Sepinwall of Uproxx wrote, "And there it is: the serialized story that had been hiding in plain sight all along among the seemingly random short stories Atlanta has been telling throughout this superb second season." Matt Miller of Esquire wrote, "'North of the Border' is a powerful and painful episode of television." Bryan Washington of Vulture gave the episode a 4 star rating out of 5 and wrote, "At their current trajectory, the split was bound to happen. But, of course, Earn has to fuck it up a little bit more, in what ultimately becomes a master-class performance in six parts."

Leigh-Anne Jackson of The New York Times wrote, "After last week's brutal onslaught of life lessons, Al is ready for a change." Jacob Oller of Paste gave the episode an 8.2 out of 10 rating and wrote, "After a string of existential one-offs for the characters of Atlanta, 'North of the Border' sees the show's central posse reconvene for a somewhat normal episode." Miles Surrey of The Ringer wrote, "If we're handing out an LVP award for the season thus far, it has to go to Earn: He broke things off with Van in a way that was disconcertingly apathetic, and aside from a jarring meeting at a virtually all-white Spotify-esque company, he hasn't been leveraging Paper Boi's nascent rap stardom nearly as well as he could have. 'North of the Border' is the last straw."
