= Champagne Papi =

Champagne Papi may refer to:

- Drake (musician), a Canadian rapper with the nickname "Champagne Papi"
- "Champagne Papi" (Atlanta), an episode of American TV series Atlanta
