= FUBU (Atlanta) =

- Atlanta episode
- Episode no.: Season 2 Episode 10
- Directed by: Donald Glover
- Written by: Stephen Glover
- Cinematography by: Christian Sprenger
- Editing by: Isaac Hagy
- Production code: XAA02010
- Original air date: May 3, 2018
- Running time: 26 minutes

Guest appearances
- Myra Lucretia Taylor as Earn's Mother; Alkoya Brunson as Young Earn; Abraham Clinkscales as Young Alfred; Myles Truitt as Devin Meyers

Episode chronology
← Previous "North of the Border"	Next → "Crabs in a Barrel"
- Atlanta season 2

"FUBU" is the tenth episode of the second season of the American comedy-drama television series Atlanta. It is the 20th overall episode of the series and was written by executive producer Stephen Glover and directed by series creator and main actor Donald Glover. It was first broadcast on FX in the United States on May 3, 2018.

The series is set in Atlanta and follows Earnest "Earn" Marks, as he tries to redeem himself in the eyes of his ex-girlfriend Van, who is also the mother of his daughter Lottie; as well as his parents and his cousin Alfred, who raps under the stage name "Paper Boi"; and Darius, Alfred's eccentric right-hand man. The episode deviates from the previous episodes in the series by focusing on younger iterations of Earn and Alfred during middle school. Therefore, this is the first episode of the series where none of the main cast (Donald Glover, Brian Tyree Henry, Lakeith Stanfield and Zazie Beetz) appear.

According to Nielsen Media Research, the episode was seen by an estimated 0.694 million household viewers and gained a 0.4 ratings share among adults aged 18–49. The episode received critical acclaim, with critics praising Glover's directing, the performances, themes and character development. For his work in the episode, Donald Glover received an Outstanding Directing for a Comedy Series nomination at the 70th Primetime Emmy Awards.

== Plot ==
In the late 1990s, a young Earn (Alkoya Brunson) is accompanying his mother (Myra Lucretia Taylor) to shop at Marshalls. While wandering, he takes an interest on a yellow FUBU shirt and asks his mother to buy it for him, which she accepts to do. He then happily wears the shirt to school the next day.

While going on the bus, Earn and his friend witness a boy punching another boy when he inadvertently is thrown a yogurt at his face. At school, Earn is complimented for his shirt until a classmate named Devin Meyers (Myles Truitt) shows up with a similar FUBU shirt. The classmates then start deducing that one of them is wearing a counterfeit shirt. A substitute teacher appears, and one of the students openly mocks his weight and refuses to follow his orders.

Alfred (Abraham Clinkscales) sells a student his own stolen calculator and is taken to the principal's office, where he tries to play it off as racism and is just warned to not do it again. While working on a science project next to his crush, Earn rips a hole under his arm while removing a thread hanging from his shirt, and Devin notices. Earn is later mocked by two students who claim his shirt is fake, dubbing it "FEBE". He later learns that a student that was absent earlier that day, Johnny, will soon arrive to confirm who has the fake shirt. He then sees as the two students mock Devin too for his shirt, while also being told that whoever has the fake shirt will be roasted by the entire school.

Desperate, Earn asks Alfred for help, telling him about the thread on his shirt. Alfred tells him that he will take care of it. When the school day ends, Earn tries to hurriedly leave but is intercepted by the classmates and Johnny, who comes to the conclusion that Earn's shirt is fake as it says "made in Bangladesh" instead of "made in China". As they start mocking him, Alfred arrives and tells them that Earn's shirt is the correct one, as Johnny is biased because he is Chinese (when he is actually Filipino) and the classmates start mocking Devin, who leaves humiliated. As he leaves, Earn gets the phone number from his crush but also sees more students harassing Devin.

The next day, Earn and his class are informed that Devin committed suicide, and that Devin has been struggling since his parents were divorcing, with the school staff apparently unaware of the recent harassment against him. When Earn arrives home, he is questioned by his mother and aunt about Devin, but none are actually accusing him of being involved. His mother also mentions that she bought him another FUBU shirt. Earn sits with Alfred on the couch, guilt-ridden about the events although Alfred does not seem to be affected.

== Production ==
=== Development ===
"Y'all youngins don't know nothing about this. This one takes me back to middle school. Shout out Miller Grove!"

— Official description in the press release for the episode.

In April 2018, FX announced that the tenth episode of the season would be titled "FUBU" and that it would be written by executive producer Stephen Glover, and directed by series creator and main star Donald Glover. This was Stephen Glover's seventh writing credit, and Donald Glover's fourth directing credit.

== Reception ==
=== Viewers ===
The episode was watched by 0.694 million viewers, earning a 0.4 in the 18-49 rating demographics on the Nielson ratings scale. This means that 0.4 percent of all households with televisions watched the episode. This was a 42% increase from the previous episode, which was watched by 0.487 million viewers with a 0.2 in the 18-49 demographics.

=== Critical reviews ===
"FUBU" received critical acclaim. The review aggregator website Rotten Tomatoes reported a 100% approval rating for the episode, based on 9 reviews, with an average rating of 8.5/10.

Joshua Alston of The A.V. Club gave the episode a "B+" and wrote, "'FUBU' has a vestigial quality, which probably sounds like an insult, but it's not intended to. Perhaps it's because Atlanta has acclimated its audience to ten-episode seasons, and Robbin’ Season features 11, including 'FUBU', the first episode of the show in which none of the regular cast members appear. But it feels less like a standard installment of Atlanta and more like a canonical, full-length webisode, one that, like many episodes of this show, could be inconspicuously plucked out of the episode sequence. That said, it's a mostly pleasant surprise that shades in characters we've seen a lot but still don't really know that well." Ben Travers of IndieWire gave the episode an "A−" and wrote, "Earn may struggle to see the big picture, but Atlanta always does. There's a lot to unpack in 'FUBU', but there's value in the specific story and the larger one. Clothes are important, but so is family."

Alan Sepinwall of Uproxx wrote, "It really does feel like the season has been building to something important between Earn and Al, and this origin story was part of that, in addition to being a bittersweet nostalgia trip in its own right." Matt Miller of Esquire wrote, "this show has consistently provided completely unexpected episodes. Maybe Glover's next episode will take place in the future. Maybe it'll be from the perspective of his mom. But whatever it is, Glover has proved he can pull it off." Bryan Washington of Vulture gave the episode a perfect 5 star rating out of 5 and wrote, "It's taken me a few months to condense the feeling into words, but I think Donald Glover, Hiro Murai, and company create illusions so all-encompassing that they've created a world with its own mechanisms, functioning independently, in tandem with, and in spite of its viewers. That's what the show does better than anything else on television. All of that preamble is to say that 'FUBU' is a masterpiece. It simply can't be overstated what an achievement this episode is."

Leigh-Anne Jackson of The New York Times wrote, "In the present day, Al and Earn have come to a crossroads. Al's ready to level up in his career and Earn is little more than dead weight. 'FUBU' offers the first substantial glimpse into their past, revealing that Al has a decades-old history of carrying his cousin." Jacob Oller of Paste gave the episode an 8.4 out of 10 rating and wrote, "Atlanta's second season has been ambitious in the extreme, teaching its lessons in one-offs that separate its characters and genres that don't bend so much as become multi-hyphenates. Its first all-flashback episode is just as dark and just as revealing." Miles Surrey of The Ringer wrote, "Last week's 'North of the Border' might've been the breaking point for Earn and Paper Boi’s professional (and personal) relationship, when the rapper finally put his foot down and dismissed his ill-equipped manager. How will this split affect their respective journeys, and what does Atlanta look like when its two lead protagonists are at an impasse? That answer is on hold until next week's finale; Thursday's penultimate episode, 'FUBU', is about how the dynamics of their relationship were first planted. That means we have to go back in time."
