= Big George Foreman =

2023 film by George Tillman Jr.

- Theatrical release poster
- Directed by: George Tillman Jr.
- Screenplay by: Frank Baldwin; George Tillman Jr.
- Story by: Dan Gordon; Frank Baldwin; George Tillman Jr.
- Produced by: David Zelon
- Starring: Khris Davis; Jasmine Mathews; John Magaro; Sullivan Jones; Lawrence Gilliard Jr.; Sonja Sohn; Forest Whitaker
- Cinematography: David Tattersall; John Matysiak
- Edited by: Alex Blatt; Craig Hayes
- Music by: Marcelo Zarvos
- Production companies: Affirm Films; Mandalay Pictures
- Distributed by: Sony Pictures Releasing
- Release date: April 28, 2023
- Running time: 129 minutes
- Country: United States
- Language: English
- Budget: $32 million
- Box office: $6 million

Big George Foreman: The Miraculous Story of the Once and Future Heavyweight Champion of the World (or simply Big George Foreman) (Note: The title as given onscreen is Big George Foreman with "Based on a true story" underneath.) is a 2023 American biographical sports drama film on the life of world heavyweight boxing champion George Foreman, played by Khris Davis. It was directed by George Tillman Jr. and also stars Jasmine Mathews, John Magaro, Sullivan Jones, Lawrence Gilliard Jr., Sonja Sohn and Forest Whitaker.

Development on Big George Foreman began in 2021 and after several production delays, filming took place on a budget of $32 million from February to March 2022 in New Orleans. The film was released theatrically by Sony Pictures Releasing on April 28, 2023, and grossed $6 million.

== Plot ==
A young George Foreman lives in poverty in Houston, Texas with his siblings and his religious mother Nancy. Foreman, however, is riddled with anger issues and violent outbursts. As a young adult, Foreman barely evades arrest for mugging and decides to join the Job Corps as a last-ditch effort to turn his life around. There, he befriends his roommate Desmond Baker, though his violent outbursts nearly get him expelled. However, the Job Corps' chairman Doc Broadus, a boxing trainer, encourages Foreman to take up boxing and channel his rage into the sport instead of fighting.

Foreman proves to be gifted in the sport and after one year of boxing, he wins the gold medal for the United States against Jonas Čepulis at the 1968 Summer Olympics. He moves to Oakland, California to train, where Dick Sadler and former world Light-Heavyweight champion Archie Moore join his team as trainers, and he meets journalist Paula, whom he starts a relationship with and eventually marries. Doc, Paula and Desmond are by his side as Foreman's career flourishes, ultimately winning a fight against Joe Frazier in 1973 and becoming the heavyweight champion. Following his win, Foreman hires Desmond to handle his finances. Foreman's career enables him to live lavishly, however he regularly cheats on Paula with other women and he is dismissive over his mother's attribution of his successes as blessings from God.

Foreman is heavily taunted by Muhammad Ali, whom he fights at The Rumble in the Jungle in 1974, where he loses due to Ali's rope-a-dope strategy. Foreman fires Sadler and Moore, and Paula divorces Foreman due to his infidelity. Following an embarrassing Foreman vs. Five match where he is further mocked by Ali, he is called to the hospital where his sister Mary's newborn baby is in poor health. Witnessing his family praying for the baby, Foreman goes outside and angrily prays to God for a sign, offering himself instead of the baby's life. The baby is miraculously saved, and Mary names her son after her brother.

After losing to Jimmy Young in 1977, Foreman suffers from heatstroke and collapses from exhaustion, having a near-death experience where he finds himself in a place of nothingness and says that he finally believes before waking up. He becomes a devout Christian and disavows boxing to become a full-time preacher, much to the delight of Nancy and the disappointment of Doc. He makes amends with Ali and Paula for his past behavior towards them. At church, he meets and pursues a relationship with fellow believer Mary Joan Martelly.

Years later, Foreman has married Mary Joan and started a family with her. He is a preacher at the Church of the Lord Jesus Christ, and opened a youth community center to help troubled youth. However, in 1985, he realizes the center is in danger of being closed down after finding out he is in debt due to Desmond mishandling his funds. Nancy tells him that despite losing everything, all he needs is already inside him, and he decides to forgive Desmond after confronting him.

Foreman's attempts to capitalize on his earlier fame is not enough to save the center. He reluctantly decides to return to boxing to earn money, and with Mary Joan and Doc's encouragement, he trains to get back in shape and decides to start his career again from the bottom. Rejecting his prior rage for a more positive outlook, Foreman manages to win several fights and enters a match against Evander Holyfield. Although he loses to Holyfield, the payments from the fight - as well as a profitable deal involving grills - are enough to pay his debts and reopen the center. He works his way up to a match against reigning champion Michael Moorer, which he wins and regains his title as heavyweight champion of the world. Foreman reflects that he had to be knocked down to the bottom to realize everything he was searching for was already there.

An epilogue shares that Foreman had become close friends with Ali; Doc was inducted in the World Boxing Hall of Fame in 1998; and Foreman continues to preach at his church and run his youth center in Houston.

== Cast ==
- Khris Davis as George Foreman
- Jasmine Mathews as Mary Joan Martelly, later Foreman
- Sullivan Jones as Muhammad Ali
- Lawrence Gilliard Jr. as Archie Moore
- John Magaro as Desmond
- Sam Trammell as Rev. Virdell Stokes
- Sonja Sohn as Nancy Foreman
- Forest Whitaker as Doc Broadus
- Shein Mompremier as Paula Foreman
- Robert Cicchini as Angelo Dundee
- Matthew Glave as Howard Cosell
- Erica Tazel as Mary Foreman
- Al Sapienza as Gil Clancy
- Dwayne Barnes as Dick Sadler
- Deion Smith as Roy Foreman
- K Steele as Gloria Foreman
- Nile Memmezzwattay as Bully
- Carlos Takam as Joe Frazier
- Cedric Boswell as Sonny Liston
- Tom Virtue as Johnny Carson
- Phillip Craddock-Haney as Jonas Cepulis

== Production ==
A biographical film based on George Foreman's career was reported in 2021. George Tillman Jr. was hired to direct from a screenplay he co-wrote with Frank Baldwin, which is adapted from a screen story written by Tillman, Baldwin, and Dan Gordon. Khris Davis was cast as Foreman, Forest Whitaker as Doc Broadus, and Sullivan Jones as Muhammad Ali. Michael K. Williams was originally cast as Doc Broadus (Foreman's trainer and mentor), but died before production began.

=== Filming ===
Under the working title Heart of a Lion, principal photography was set to begin in late 2021 in New Orleans, Louisiana, but was halted by the landfall of Hurricane Ida. Production was set to resume filming in Shreveport by that November but was shut down until early 2022 for an unreported reason. Filming took place from February to March 2022 in New Orleans.

== Release ==
The film was originally scheduled to be released on September 16, 2022, but was pushed to March 24, 2023. It was pushed back again and was released on April 28, 2023, by Sony Pictures Releasing. The film was released digitally on May 16, with a Blu-ray and DVD release to follow on June 27.

== Reception ==
=== Box office ===
In the United States and Canada, Big George Foreman was released alongside Sisu and Are You There God? It's Me, Margaret., and was projected to gross around $5 million from 3,054 theaters in its opening weekend. It made $1 million on its first day, including $250,000 from Thursday night previews. The film went on to debut to $2.9 million, finishing 11th at the box office.

The film has grossed $5.4 million in the United States and Canada, and $604,430 in other territories, for a worldwide total of $6 million.

=== Critical response ===
On the review aggregator website Rotten Tomatoes, 42% of 52 critics' reviews are positive, with an average rating of 4.8/10. The website's consensus reads: "Big George Foreman had a classic sports story to work with; unfortunately, the sluggishly ordinary way it's told here is more Tomato Can than Heavyweight Champion." Metacritic, which uses a weighted average, assigned the film a score of 45 out of 100, based on 11 critics, indicating "mixed or average" reviews. Audiences surveyed by CinemaScore gave the film an average grade of "A–" on an A+ to F scale, while those polled by PostTrak gave it an 86% positive score.

== See also ==
- List of boxing films
