= South of the Border =

South of the Border may refer to:

== Music ==
- "South of the Border" (1939 song), popular song, notably recorded by Gene Autry, as well as Frank Sinatra
- South of the Border (Charlie Parker album), 1952
- South of the Border (Caterina Valente album), 1963
- South of the Border (Herb Alpert's Tijuana Brass album), 1964
- South of the Border (David Murray album), 1993
- "South of the Border" (Robbie Williams song), 1997
- "South of the Border" (Ed Sheeran song), 2019

== Film and television ==
- South of the Border (1939 film), Gene Autry film featuring June Storey
- South of the Border with Disney, 1942 short documentary film
- South of the Border (2009 film), a documentary by Oliver Stone
- South of the Border, alternative title for the 2006 South Korean film Over the Border
- South of the Border, situation comedy produced by Yorkshire Television in 1985
- South of the Border, two-part episode of My Name Is Earl
- South of the Border (TV series), a British detective drama series

== Other uses ==
- South of the Border (attraction), rest stop and roadside attraction in South Carolina, U.S.

== See also ==
- North of the Border (disambiguation)
