= Alligator Man =

- Atlanta episode
- Episode no.: Season 2 Episode 1
- Directed by: Hiro Murai
- Written by: Donald Glover
- Production code: XAA02001
- Original air date: March 1, 2018
- Running time: 30 minutes

Guest appearances
- Katt Williams as Willy; Khris Davis as Tracy

Episode chronology
← Previous "The Jacket"	Next → "Sportin' Waves"
- Atlanta season 2

"Alligator Man" is the first episode of the second season of the American comedy-drama television series Atlanta, and the eleventh episode of the series overall. It was originally broadcast on FX in the United States on March 1, 2018. The episode follows series protagonist Earn as he tries to break up a domestic disturbance involving his uncle, played by guest star Katt Williams.

The episode was praised by critics and received 0.851 million viewers in its initial airing.

== Plot ==
The episode opens with a robbery of a Mrs. Winner's committed by two teenagers.

Later, sometime before Christmas, Earn is "evicted" from his storage facility space. He visits Alfred (who is under house arrest) and Darius (who is mutually at odds with Alfred). After Earn reviews the terms of his probation, Earn and Darius then visit Earn's uncle Willy to defuse a domestic disturbance. Willy is antagonistic even when the police arrive but eventually simmers down and flees the house after talking to Earn about not repeating his history of professional and personal mistakes, but not before giving Earn a gold-plated handgun.

Earn and Darius then return to Alfred's house, but Earn chooses not to ask to stay with them after Tracy, one of Alfred's friends and an ex-con, beats him to it, making him officially homeless.

== Production ==
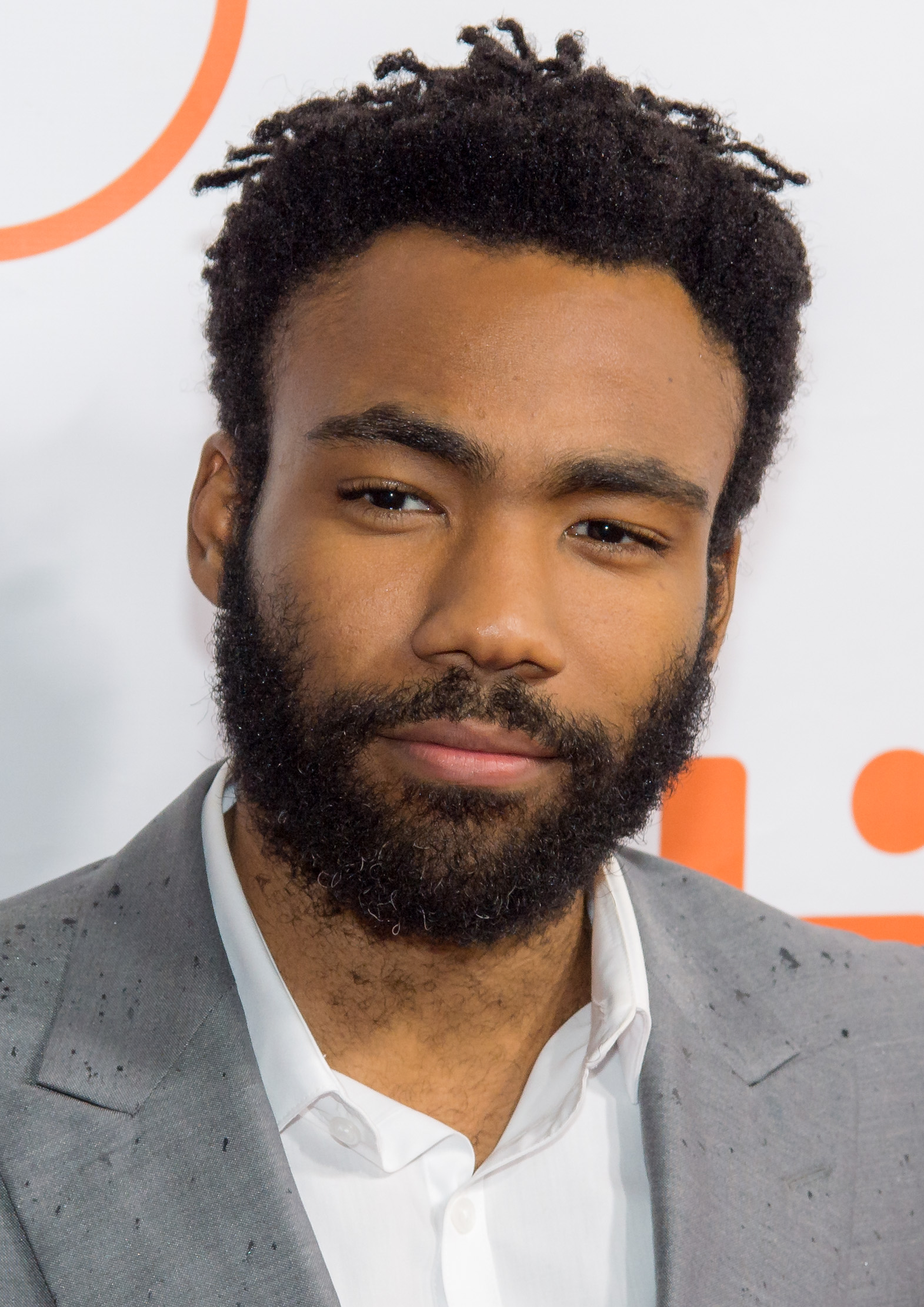
Atlanta creator and star Donald Glover wrote the episode.

The episode prominently references the Florida Man meme.

== Reception ==
"Alligator Man" received positive reviews from critics. Vulture praised the opening gunfight sequence of the episode and "when the blood and screams flip the vibe from slapstick to horror". The publication did, however, criticize the role of women in the show as people that "things simply happen to", rather than agents of change.

The episode received 0.851 million viewers in its initial airing, described as "steady" with the ratings from the first season's finale, "The Jacket". "Alligator Man" scored a 0.4 rating in the 18–49 demographic.

Donald Glover received a Primetime Emmy Award nomination for Outstanding Writing for a Comedy Series for this episode. Katt Williams won the Primetime Emmy Award for Outstanding Guest Actor in a Comedy Series for his performance in this episode. It additionally received a nomination for the Primetime Emmy Award for Outstanding Single-Camera Picture Editing for a Comedy Series.
