= Champagne Papi (Atlanta) =

- Atlanta episode
- Episode no.: Season 2 Episode 7
- Directed by: Amy Seimetz
- Written by: Ibra Ake
- Cinematography by: Christian Sprenger
- Editing by: Kyle Reiter
- Production code: XAA02007
- Original air date: April 12, 2018
- Running time: 26 minutes

Guest appearances
- Adriyan Rae as Candice; Danielle Deadwyler as Tami; Gail Bean as Nadine

Episode chronology
← Previous "Teddy Perkins"	Next → "Woods"
- Atlanta season 2

"Champagne Papi" is the seventh episode of the second season of the American comedy-drama television series Atlanta. It is the 17th overall episode of the series and was written by Ibra Ake, and directed by Amy Seimetz. It was first broadcast on FX in the United States on April 12, 2018.

The series is set in Atlanta and follows Earnest "Earn" Marks, as he tries to redeem himself in the eyes of his ex-girlfriend Van, who is also the mother of his daughter Lottie; as well as his parents and his cousin Alfred, who raps under the stage name "Paper Boi"; and Darius, Alfred's eccentric right-hand man. In the episode, Van and her friends attend a New Year's Eve party hosted by Drake, hoping that meeting him will improve her image. At the mansion, she discovers one of Drake's secrets.

According to Nielsen Media Research, the episode was seen by an estimated 0.694 million household viewers and gained a 0.4 ratings share among adults aged 18–49. The episode received extremely positive reviews from critics, who praised the episode's absurdist themes and performances. Its exploration of feminine beauty ideal and negative effects of social media drew attention.

== Plot ==
On New Year's Eve, Van (Zazie Beetz) meets with her friends Candice (Adriyan Rae), Tami (Danielle Deadwyler) and Nadine (Gail Bean), with all four planning to go to a party at a mansion hosted by Drake, who will be present. Van wants to improve her Instagram page by meeting Drake, as she feels that it only involves Lottie and Earn (Donald Glover).

They are picked up in a party bus, which leaves them in front of Drake's mansion. One of the attendees is revealed to have a fake invitation and is restrained by the security guards while the rest of the girls are allowed inside. Van and her friends meet Candice's boyfriend, DJ, who claims that Drake is moving around the house. DJ gives Van, Tami and Nadine marijuana-infused gummies to consume, although Nadine reacts badly as it is her first drug use. Van leaves Nadine in a room to recover and meets a man named Brandon, who claims that his cousin is Drake's nutritionist and takes her to Drake's studio to charge her phone. After Brandon leaves, Van sneaks into one of Drake's rooms (which contains a Mexican flag), where she puts on one of his jackets.

Nadine has left the room and is now conversing next to a pool with Darius (Lakeith Stanfield), who is explaining a version of the Bostrom simulation argument, that everything is a simulation and nothing is real. As Van continues wandering through Drake's rooms, Candice messages her that she is leaving with DJ to go to another party hosted by T-Pain.

Meanwhile, Tami starts an argument with a white woman who is dating a Black celebrity actor whom Tami likes, over racial issues around privileged white women dating successful Black men. The actor appears and his girlfriend leaves with him, saying "sorry" to Tami.

Looking for her friends, Van wanders to a room where a Spanish-speaking man (Carlos Guerrero) is watching TV. Van only recognizes a few words of Spanish, and eventually works out that he is Drake's grandfather, and that Drake is not at the party at all, but, as indicated on a wall calendar, away on a European tour. She returns upstairs to the party and is dismayed to discover guests paying $20 to take pictures with cardboard cutouts of Drake to pretend that he was with them. Van finds Nadine with Darius, who says he got into the party because he knows Drake's chef. Nadine says that everyone is in a simulation, and Van agrees, in a sense, saying Drake doesn't exist. Tami arrives and says the party is over. Van, Darius, Nadine and Tami walk home along the roadside in the dawn light, and Van suddenly exclaims, "Drake is Mexican!”

== Production ==
=== Development ===
"Yeah girl, we gonna party tonight! But if you don't post about it, did it really happen?"

— Official description in the press release for the episode.

In March 2018, FX announced that the seventh episode of the season would be titled "Champagne Papi" and that it would be written by Ibra Ake, and directed by Amy Seimetz. This was Ake's first writing credit, and Seimetz' second directing credit.

=== Casting ===
Gail Bean, who played Nadine in the episode, auditioned for the role by performing two scenes that could take on a party, explaining "It was just me in line at the bathroom and somebody was cutting in and bumping into us, and I said something, but Zazie's character Van is the one who got a little hostile. I believe the second scene I did for the audition was... It was a whole weird thing where I was talking to Young Thug, and he was having a situation with one of his females and I was supposed to be giving him advice on how to handle it. And then Darius shows up, of course, like he always does and I'm like, how does he know Young Thug, and he's like, 'Oh, he was my ride for the party.'"

== Reception ==
=== Viewers ===
The episode was watched by 0.694 million viewers, earning a 0.4 in the 18-49 rating demographics on the Nielson ratings scale. This means that 0.4 percent of all households with televisions watched the episode. This was a 11% decrease from the previous episode, which was watched by 0.776 million viewers with a 0.4 in the 18-49 demographics.

With DVR factored, the episode was watched by 1.45 million viewers with a 0.8 in the 18-49 demographics.

=== Critical reviews ===
"Champagne Papi" received critical acclaim. The review aggregator website Rotten Tomatoes reported a 100% approval rating for the episode, based on 10 reviews, with an average rating of 8.1/10. The site's consensus states: "While not quite as surreal as its preceding episode, 'Champagne Papi' delivers an effective and entertaining critique of social media obsession and vanity."

Joshua Alston of The A.V. Club gave the episode a "B" and wrote, "'Champagne Papi' is a weird comedown after the tense mindfuck that is 'Teddy Perkins', neither wildly inventive as that episode or as intimate as 'Value'. It's a grab bag of frequently fun moments (including that killer final line), but it doesn't do enough to illuminate a character I always want more of."

Alan Sepinwall of Uproxx wrote, "So, no, it wasn't 'Teddy Perkins 2: The Secret of the Ooze', but there was no way it could be, and 'Champagne Papi' was quite fine in its own right." Hanh Nguyen of IndieWire wrote, "Although seemingly more straightforward than the horrifying 'Teddy Perkins', Thursday's episode 'Champagne Papi' goes deep and questions the very nature of reality."

Matt Miller of Esquire wrote, "It's a visual re-creation of 'Hotline Bling' told from the woman's perspective. Van and all her friends just want to get a picture with Drake for the 'Gram, but nothing goes exactly how they planned." Bryan Washington of Vulture gave the episode a 4 star rating out of 5 and wrote, "We don't end up learning much about Van in this episode, but she learns a little more about herself. There's the hype before the show, there's the posturing throughout, and then there's the walking back to your car afterward: a journey we all make alone, at the end of the day, stuck inside of our own heads. It isn't the most that we could ask for, but considering what we've already been given, I think that it's enough for now."

Leigh-Anne Jackson of The New York Times wrote, "It's both a big-picture observation and a critique of the posturing - social media-fueled and otherwise - of the partygoers around the characters." Jacob Oller of Paste gave the episode an 8.5 out of 10 rating and praised Powell's performance, "At the end of the night you're gonna be walking home with the rest of the losers on your own social rung, so you might as well take the revelations where you can. And in that, there may be meaning. Even a terrible party can be worth something." Miles Surrey of The Ringer wrote, "On most shows, that would be perceived as a metaphor. But on Atlanta, where NBA players drive invisible cars, Michael Vick is ready to race you for cash outside a nightclub, and Justin Bieber is black, perhaps it's literal. Maybe Van's right: Maybe there is no Drake."

=== Drake's response ===
A few days after the episode aired, Drake reacted to the episode, posting on Instagram, "this shit is surreal, I'm too high for this."
