= Khris Davis (actor) =

American actor

- Occupation: Actor
- Years active: 2013–present

Khris Davis is an American film, stage and television actor. He is known for his roles as Steel in the drama film Judas and the Black Messiah and Malik in Space Jam: A New Legacy, and for starring as the title character in the film Big George Foreman.

== Career ==
Davis was raised in Camden, New Jersey, and began acting as a student at Creative Arts Academy.

A 2009 cum laude graduate of Cheyney University who earned a degree in theatre arts, Davis had his breakthrough role when he appeared in the 2017 film Detroit.

On December 12, 2018, Davis was cast as Luke in the Joseph Cross-directed film Summer Night. On May 27, 2021, Davis was cast as George Foreman in George Tillman Jr.'s 2023 biopic Big George Foreman. In May 2022, Davis was cast as Biff Loman in Miranda Cromwell and Marianne Elliott's Broadway revival of Death of a Salesman along with Wendell Pierce, Sharon D. Clarke, and André De Shields. In 2025, he starred in a Shakespeare In The Park production of Twelfth Night; or What You Will as Orsino.

== Filmography ==
Film
Year	Title	Role	Notes	Ref.
2017	Detroit	Blind Pig Patron		
2019	Summer Night	Luke		
2019	Goldie	Jay		
2021	Judas and the Black Messiah	Steel		
2021	Space Jam: A New Legacy	Malik		
2023	Big George Foreman	George Foreman		

Television
Year	Title	Role	Notes	Ref.
2015	Unforgettable	Security Guard	Episode: "All In"	
2018–22	Atlanta	Tracy	7 episodes	
2019	The Blacklist	Agent Randolph	2 episodes	

Theater
Year	Title	Role	Notes	Ref.
2016	The Royale	Jay		
2017	Sweat	Chris		
2018	Fireflies	Charles		
2022	Death of a Salesman	Biff Loman		
2025	Twelfth Night	Orsino		

== Awards and nominations ==
Nominations

- 2016 Drama League Awards - Distinguished Performance Award – The Royale
