= Brian Tyree Henry =

American actor (born 1982)

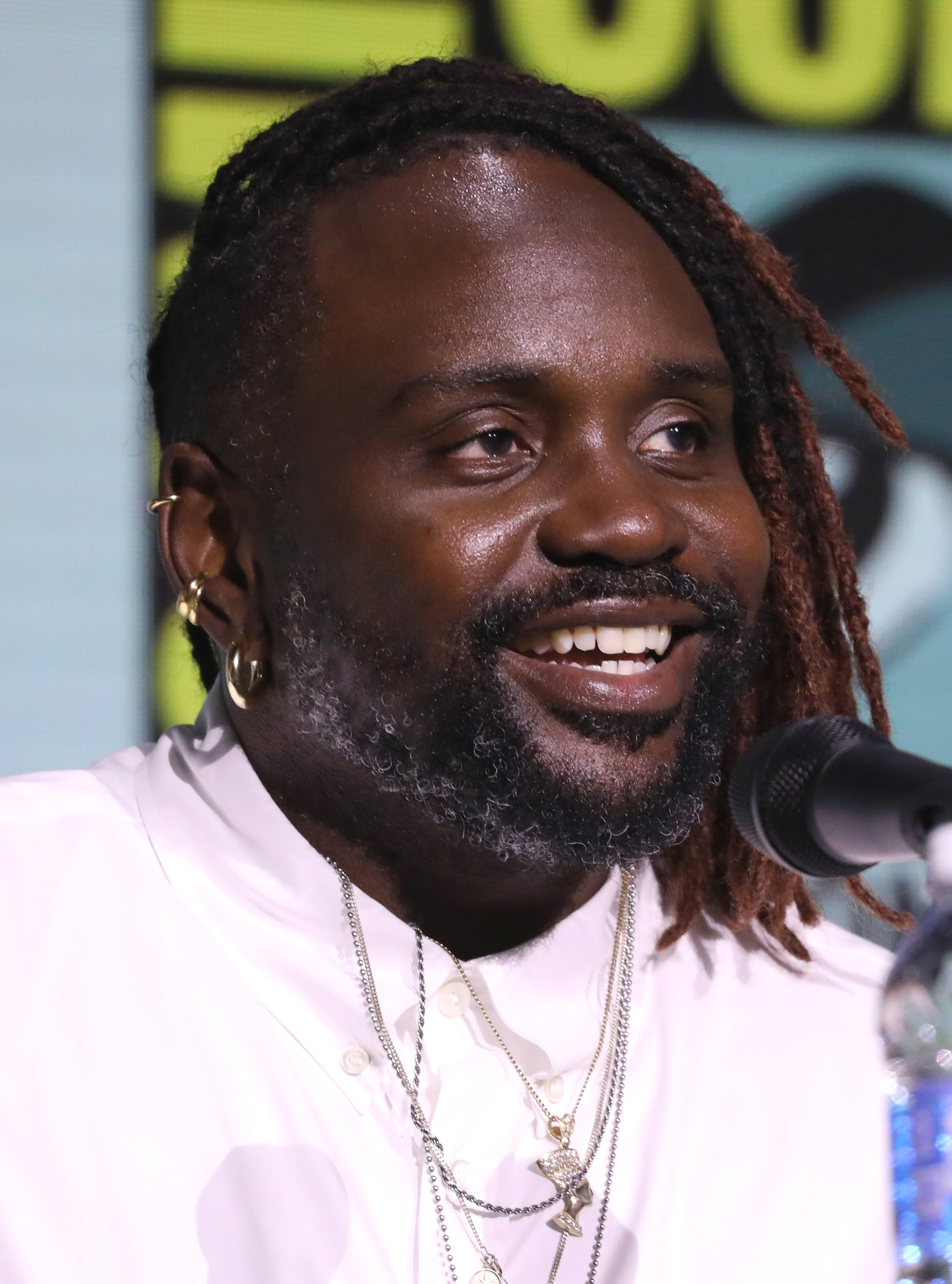
- Henry at the 2024 San Diego Comic-Con
- Born: March 31, 1982 (age 44); Fayetteville, North Carolina, U.S.
- Education: Morehouse College (BA); Yale University (MFA)
- Occupation: Actor
- Years active: 2007–present

Brian Tyree Henry (born March 31, 1982) is an American actor. Known for his roles on stage and screen, he has received nominations for an Academy Award, a Tony Award, an Actor Award, two Critics' Choice Awards, and three Primetime Emmy Awards.

Henry rose to prominence for his role as rapper Alfred "Paper Boi" Miles in the FX comedy-drama series Atlanta (2016–2022), for which he received a nomination for the Primetime Emmy Award for Outstanding Supporting Actor in a Comedy Series. He also was Emmy-nominated for his guest role on the NBC drama series This Is Us (2017) and for his leading role in the Apple TV+ limited series Dope Thief (2025).

His film breakthrough came in 2018 with roles in Steve McQueen's heist film Widows and Barry Jenkins' romantic drama If Beale Street Could Talk. He has since appeared in Child's Play (2019), Joker (2019), Godzilla vs. Kong (2021), Bullet Train (2022), and Godzilla x Kong: The New Empire (2024). He portrayed Phastos in the Marvel Cinematic Universe film Eternals (2021), and was nominated for the Academy Award for Best Supporting Actor for playing a grieving man in the drama film Causeway (2022). He also voiced Jefferson Davis in Spider-Man: Into the Spider-Verse (2018) and its sequel Spider-Man: Across the Spider-Verse (2023) and Megatron in Transformers One (2024).

On stage, he made his debut performance in the Shakespeare in the Park production of Romeo and Juliet (2007), before making his Broadway debut in the original cast of The Book of Mormon (2011). He was nominated for the Tony Award for Best Featured Actor in a Play for his role as a stern yet caring security guard in the revival of the Kenneth Lonergan play Lobby Hero (2018).

== Early life and education ==
Henry was born on March 31, 1982, in Fayetteville, North Carolina and raised partly in Washington, D.C. His father was in the military, and his mother, Willow Dean Kearse, was an educator. Henry graduated from E. E. Smith High School in Fayetteville and attended Morehouse College in Atlanta, Georgia as a business major-turned-actor in the early 2000s. He received his master's degree from the Yale School of Drama.

== Career ==
=== 2007–2015: Early career ===
Henry began his career on stage, with roles in numerous plays and musicals. In 2007, he starred as Tybalt in Shakespeare in the Park's production of Romeo and Juliet. Henry also appeared in Tarell Alvin McCraney's trilogy of plays, titled The Brother/Sister Plays. In 2011, he received further success in his Broadway debut as a part of the original cast of the musical The Book of Mormon opposite Josh Gad and Andrew Rannells.

Henry made guest appearances in television series such as NBC's Law & Order, and CBS's The Good Wife. In 2013, he had a brief but recurring role as Winston Scrapper in HBO's Boardwalk Empire appearing in the episodes "Havre de Grace" and "Farewell Daddy Blues". The following year he appeared in Steven Soderbergh's Cinemax series The Knick as Larkin in the episode "The Busy Flea". He made his feature film debut in the 2015 comedy film Puerto Ricans in Paris.

=== 2016–2018: Breakthrough and acclaim ===
In 2016, Henry received critical acclaim and recognition for his starring role as Alfred "Paper Boi" Miles in the FX comedy-drama series Atlanta. For his performance in the series, he received a nomination for the Primetime Emmy Award for Outstanding Supporting Actor in a Comedy Series for his performance in the episode "Woods". Chase Hutchinson of Collider declared Henry the "show's best character" writing, "Uniting [Atlanta] is the irreplaceable Henry's sense of presence and vulnerability he conveys as an actor, an element of the show that would not be the same without him. It makes him one of the best parts of the series and one of the best actors working today for all he manages to do in even the simplest of moments."

From 2016 to 2017, he acted as Dascious Brown in the HBO comedy series Vice Principals. In 2017, Henry appeared as Ricky in the NBC drama series This Is Us, for which he received a nomination for the Primetime Emmy Award for Outstanding Guest Actor in a Drama Series. That same year he starred in Dustin Guy Defa's drama film Person to Person and Matt Ruskin's Crown Heights.

In 2018, he returned to Broadway in the revival of Kenneth Lonergan's Lobby Hero opposite Chris Evans, Bel Powley, and Michael Cera. David Rooney of The Hollywood Reporter hailed Henry as "terrific" and cited him as "the production's standout performance". For his performance he was nominated for the Tony Award for Best Featured Actor in a Play. Also in 2018, Henry made his film breakthrough appearing in seven films. He appeared in Steve McQueen's acclaimed heist film Widows portraying Jamal Manning, a crime boss and politician in the Chicago. Alissa Wilkinson of Vox declared "Brian Tyree Henry continues his run as the actor to watch, thanks to his appearance here as a charismatic and menacing political candidate." He also appeared in Barry Jenkins' romantic drama film If Beale Street Could Talk based on the 1974 James Baldwin novel of the same name. For his performances in both films he received a nomination from the National Society of Film Critics Award for Best Supporting Actor. That same year he portrayed Jefferson Davis in the animated superhero film Spider-Man: Into the Spider-Verse which received the Academy Award for Best Animated Feature. That same year he also starred in the dystopian thriller film Hotel Artemis, and the crime drama White Boy Rick.

=== 2019–present ===
In 2019, he appeared in Todd Phillips's psychological drama Joker, the science fiction horror film Don't Let Go and the horror film Child's Play, the latter being a remake of the 1988 film. The following year he appeared in The Outside Story and Superintelligence. During this time he also appeared in the Netflix animated series BoJack Horseman, the HBO anthology series Room 104, and portrayed Berry Gordy an episode of the Comedy Central sketch series Drunk History. He also has recurring roles as Armando in the Fox animated series HouseBroken (2021), and as Elijah in the Netflix animated series Big Mouth (2022–2023).

In 2021, he starred as Bernie Hayes in Godzilla vs. Kong alongside Millie Bobby Brown and as Phastos in the Marvel Studios film Eternals directed by Chloe Zhao. In 2022, he starred in David Leitch's action comedy Bullet Train opposite Brad Pitt. In his final role of the year, Henry starred in Lila Neugebauer's A24 drama Causeway opposite Jennifer Lawrence as mechanic James Aucoin. Henry received critical acclaim for his performance, garnering Academy Award, Critics' Choice, Gotham Award, and Independent Spirit Award nominations. In a review for The Independent, Adam White wrote: "Henry lends each hushed gap in James's tale the feel of a sledgehammer." Mary Siroky for Consequence praised Henry's performance and said that he "is so grounded here that there are moments we feel like we are intruding into his life."

Henry voiced a younger Megatron in the animated film Transformers One, making him the first Black actor to voice the character. In 2024, he became the new voice of Smokey Bear.

In May 2026, Henry was cast in an undisclosed role in The Batman: Part II, scheduled for release in 2028.

In November 2026, Bass X Machina, an animated series for which Henry voices Bass Reeves and is executive producer, was released. Henry previously told Polygon that the series doesn't take away from what it means for "a Black man to go across the country being a bounty hunter," what it means for "indigenous peoples to deal with losing their land and being killed," with the series is episodic as viewers are "going on a journey" as he loves "quest anime." He had an active role in the series development, when it came to "voice casting, sound design, and details of Bass’ uniform," serving as the one who brought Janelle Monáe into the project, and stated his belief that noting that music, particularly in anime, "elevates everything." Henry later stated he took on the project after being approached by Jermaine Turner, director of adult animated series for Netflix.

== Personal life ==
Henry's mother, Willow Deane Kearse, died in early 2016. The Atlanta episode "Woods" was dedicated to her. His father died during the filming of Dope Thief.

== Acting credits ==
=== Film ===
Key
†	Denotes films that have not yet been released

Year	Title	Role	Notes
2015	Puerto Ricans in Paris	Spencer	
2017	Person to Person	Mike	
2017	Crown Heights	Clayton "Massup" Benton	
2018	Irreplaceable You	Benji	
2018	Family	Pete	
2018	Hotel Artemis	Honolulu/Lev	
2018	White Boy Rick	Det. Mel "Roach" Jackson	
2018	Widows	Jamal Manning	
2018	If Beale Street Could Talk	Daniel Carty	
2018	Spider-Man: Into the Spider-Verse	Jefferson Davis (voice)	
2019	Don't Let Go	Garret Radcliff	
2019	Child's Play	Detective Mike Norris	
2019	Joker	Carl	
2020	The Outside Story	Charles Young	
2020	Superintelligence	Dennis Caruso	
2021	Godzilla vs. Kong	Bernie Hayes	
2021	The Woman in the Window	Detective Little	
2021	Vivo	Dancarino (voice)	
2021	Eternals	Phastos	
2022	Bullet Train	Lemon	
2022	Causeway	James Aucoin	
2023	The Magician's Elephant	Leo Matienne (voice)	
2023	Spider-Man: Across the Spider-Verse	Jeff Morales (voice)	
2023	The Spider Within: A Spider-Verse Story	Jefferson Davis (voice)	Short film
2024	Godzilla x Kong: The New Empire	Bernie Hayes	
2024	The Fire Inside	Jason Crutchfield	
2024	Transformers One	D-16 / Megatron (voice)	
2024	Golden	—N/a	Unreleased
2027	Panic Carefully †	TBA	Post-production
2027	Spider-Man: Beyond the Spider-Verse †	Jeff Morales (voice)	In production
2028	The Batman: Part II †	TBA	Filming
TBA	Running †	TBA	Filming

=== Television ===
Year	Title	Role	Notes
2009	Law & Order	Ben	Episode: "Dignity"
2009	Last of the Ninth	Uniform	Television film
2010	The Good Wife	Randall Simmons	Episode: "Double Jeopardy"
2013	Boardwalk Empire	Winston 'Scrapper'	Episodes: "Havre de Grace" and "Farewell Daddy Blues"
2014	The Knick	Larkin	Episode: "The Busy Flea"
2016–2017	Vice Principals	Dascious Brown	Episodes: "The Good Book", "Gin" and "Tiger Town"
2016–2022	Atlanta	Alfred "Paper Boi" Miles	Main role
2017	How to Get Away with Murder	Public Defender	Episode: "Go Cry Somewhere Else"
2017	This Is Us	Ricky	Episode: "Memphis"
2017	Drop the Mic	Himself	Episode: "David Arquette vs. Brian Tyree Henry and Jesse Tyler Ferguson vs. Chrissy Metz"
2018	BoJack Horseman	Cooper Wallace Jr. / Strib	Voice, episode: "The Amelia Earhart Story"
2018	Room 104	Arnold	Episode: "Arnold"
2018	Drunk History	Berry Gordy	Episode: "Game Changers"
2021–2023	HouseBroken	Armando	Voice, recurring role
2022–2023	Big Mouth	Elijah / Chief	Voice, recurring role (seasons 6–7)
2023	Class of '09	Tayo Miller	Miniseries; main role
2025	Dope Thief	Ray Driscoll	Miniseries; main role
2026	Bass X Machina	Bass Reeves	Voice; main role

=== Theatre ===
Year	Title	Role	Notes
2007	Romeo and Juliet	Tybalt	Shakespeare in the Park
2007	The Brothers Size	Oshoosi	The Public Theater
2009	In The Red and Brown Water	The Egungun	The Public Theater
2009	Marcus; Or the Secret of Sweet	Oshoosi Size / Terrell	The Public Theater
2011	The Book of Mormon	General	Eugene O'Neill Theatre
2014	The Fortress of Solitude	Robert Woolfolk	The Public Theater
2018	Lobby Hero	William	Helen Hayes Theatre

== Awards and nominations ==
Organizations	Year	Category	Work	Result	Ref.
Academy Awards	2022	Best Supporting Actor	Causeway	Nominated	
Annie Awards	2025	Outstanding Voice Acting in an Animated Feature	Transformers One	Nominated	
Critics' Choice Movie Award	2022	Best Supporting Actor	Causeway	Nominated	
Critics' Choice Television Award	2019	Best Supporting Actor in a Comedy Series	Atlanta	Nominated	
Drama Desk Award	2018	Outstanding Featured Actor in a Play	Lobby Hero	Nominated	
Drama League Award	2018	Distinguished Performance	Lobby Hero	Nominated	
Independent Spirit Award	2022	Best Supporting Performance	Causeway	Nominated	
MTV Movie & TV Award	2017	Best Duo (shared with Lakeith Stanfield)	Atlanta	Nominated	
NAACP Image Award	2018	Outstanding Supporting Actor in a Motion Picture	If Beale Street Could Talk	Nominated	
Primetime Emmy Awards	2017	Outstanding Guest Actor in a Drama Series	This Is Us (episode: "Memphis")	Nominated	
Primetime Emmy Awards	2018	Outstanding Supporting Actor in a Comedy Series	Atlanta (episode: "Woods")	Nominated	
Primetime Emmy Awards	2025	Outstanding Lead Actor in a Limited Series or Movie	Dope Thief	Nominated	
Screen Actors Guild Awards	2018	Outstanding Performance by an Ensemble in a Comedy Series	Atlanta	Nominated	
Tony Awards	2018	Best Featured Actor in a Play	Lobby Hero	Nominated	
