= Helen (Atlanta) =

- Atlanta episode
- Episode no.: Season 2 Episode 4
- Directed by: Amy Seimetz
- Written by: Taofik Kolade
- Cinematography by: Christian Sprenger
- Editing by: Isaac Hagy
- Production code: XAA02005
- Original air date: March 22, 2018
- Running time: 25 minutes

Guest appearances
- Griffin Freeman as Dave; Jessica Tillman as Christina

Episode chronology
← Previous "Money Bag Shawty"	Next → "Barbershop"
- Atlanta season 2

"Helen" is the fourth episode of the second season of the American comedy-drama television series Atlanta. It is the 14th overall episode of the series and was written by Taofik Kolade, and directed by Amy Seimetz. It was first broadcast on FX in the United States on March 22, 2018.

The series is set in Atlanta and follows Earnest "Earn" Marks, as he tries to redeem himself in the eyes of his ex-girlfriend Van, who is also the mother of his daughter Lottie; as well as his parents and his cousin Alfred, who raps under the stage name "Paper Boi"; and Darius, Alfred's eccentric right-hand man. In the episode, Earn and Van go to Helen for a Fastnacht celebration. While there, Earn feels uncomfortable with the celebration and a simple ping-pong game causes both Earn and Van to address their concerns regarding their "relationship".

According to Nielsen Media Research, the episode was seen by an estimated 0.499 million household viewers and gained a 0.3 ratings share among adults aged 18–49. The episode received critical acclaim, with critics praising Seimetz's directing, Kolade's writing, Glover's and Beetz's performances and the emotional weight of the episode.

== Plot ==
Earn (Donald Glover) performs cunnilingus on Van (Zazie Beetz) before leaving Lottie with a sitter. They leave for Helen for a Fastnacht celebration due to Van's connection to Germany. While talking in the car, they halt when a pig appears on the road.

At Helen, Earn feels uncomfortable that he is the only black person at the festivity and is even mistaken for a white man in blackface, so he asks to wear a white mask. Earn is even more confused when he plays a game named "Hootz Kutz" and he inadvertently makes a move that impresses the crowd. Earn also finds himself jealous when Van talks with a bartender in fluent German. After expressing concern to Van, they decide to play ping-pong for the best of three games: if Van wins, Earn will stay and will not complain for the rest of the night; if Earn wins, they will leave the festivity. Van wins the game but Earn calls her out for rubbing the victory on him and they get into a discussion.

Van talks with her Afro-German friend, Christina (Jessica Tillman), about her discussion with Earn. At one point, she expresses frustration when Christina refers to her as "Lottie's mom" and when she claims that Van "chose black". When Van loses her phone, the whole party sets out to find it. She talks in German with the bartender, explaining her situation with Earn and how it seems to be worsening. While going to the bathroom, she is surprised by the Schnappviecher, punching him and knocking him down. She eventually finds her phone in a dumpster, just as Earn sent a message so they could talk.

Van meets with Earn at the empty room. She says she wants more commitment in their "relationship" while Earn feels fine with their current status. Van feels tired of waiting and Earn does not want her to keep wasting her time. Van then decides to use a best-of-5 game of ping-pong to settle things: if Van wins, Earn will only see her for Lottie or money; if Earn wins, she can be proven wrong and agree to his terms. When Earn asks what will this prove, she explains "it's gonna prove that I'm tired." They start playing, with both winning one round. The next morning, they drive back to her house. Earn states he will pick up Lottie later and she shuts the door, implying that she won the game.

== Production ==
=== Development ===
"When you go outside the city white people be acting different. That's why I can't even go to Marietta. Too weird."

— Official description in the press release for the episode.

In February 2018, FX announced that the fourth episode of the season would be titled "Helen" and that it would be written by Taofik Kolade, and directed by Amy Seimetz. This was Kolade's first writing credit, and Seimetz' first directing credit.

=== Filming ===
In November 2017, it was announced that Amy Seimetz would direct two episodes for the season. For the episode, she used 100mm and 200mm lenses, explaining "it makes it feel like they're being spied on the whole time. Very creepy like somebody's watching them the whole time and we get that vibe of alienation like, 'Oh wow, there are these two black people here', people just staring at them the whole time, so Earn can never quite feel it in his skin."

== Reception ==
=== Viewers ===
The episode was watched by 0.499 million viewers, earning a 0.3 in the 18-49 rating demographics on the Nielson ratings scale. This means that 0.3 percent of all households with televisions watched the episode. This was a 12% decrease from the previous episode, which was watched by 0.561 million viewers with a 0.3 in the 18-49 demographics.

With DVR factored, the episode was watched by 1.25 million viewers with a 0.7 in the 18-49 demographics.

=== Critical reviews ===
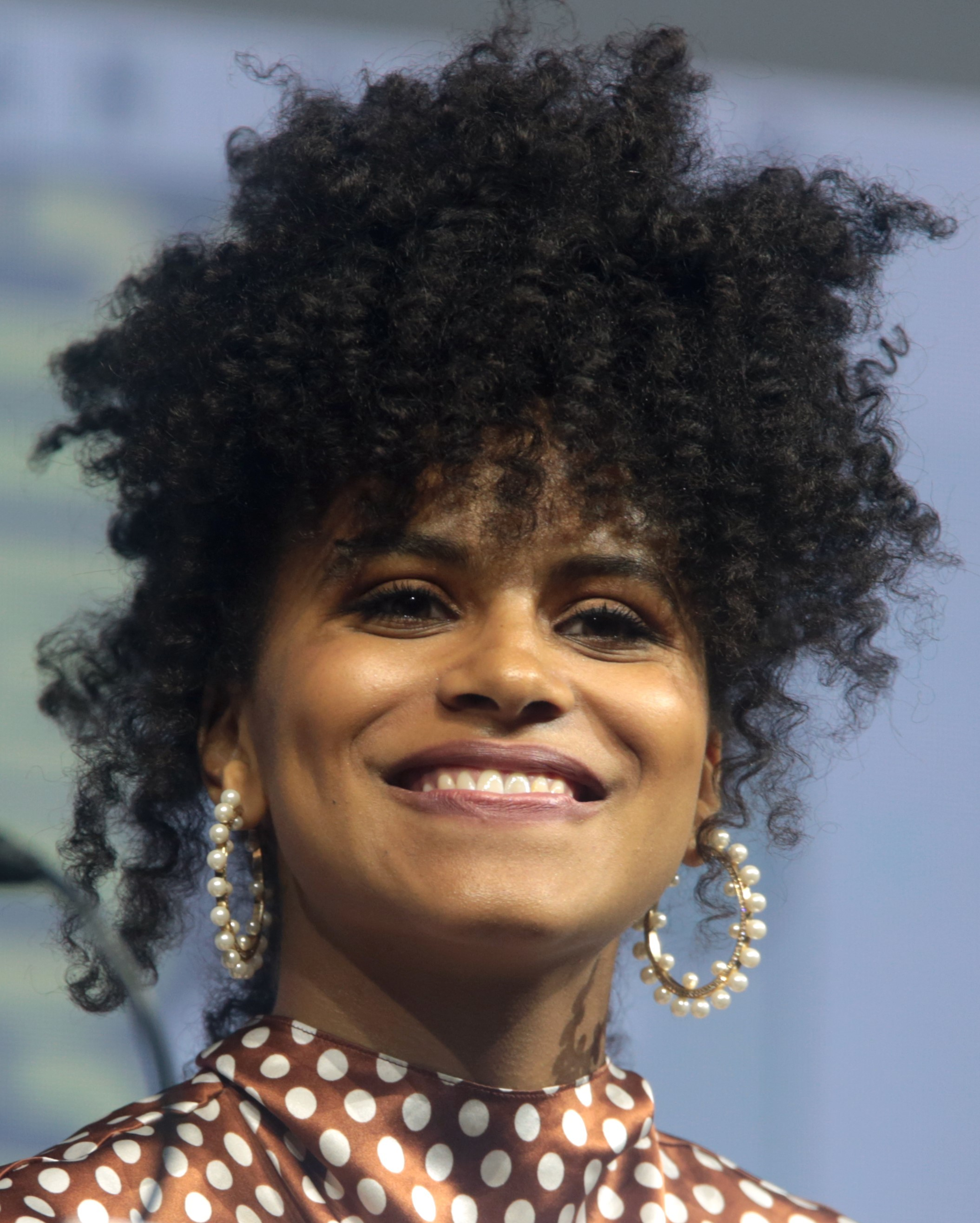
Zazie Beetz's performance received critical acclaim and garnered an Emmy nomination for Supporting Actress in a Comedy Series.

"Helen" received critical acclaim. The review aggregator website Rotten Tomatoes reported a 91% approval rating for the episode, based on 11 reviews, with an average rating of 9/10.

Joshua Alston of The A.V. Club gave the episode a "B+" and wrote, "Honestly, this show is far better at exploring its characters as individuals than it is at shading the relationships between them. So it's probably for the best that Earn and Van start to focus on themselves."

Alan Sepinwall of Uproxx wrote, "The series is plenty fantastic when Van's not around, but 'Helen' is a reminder of how much value she brings to things, even if Earn can't quite see it." Matt Miller of Esquire wrote, "The episode doesn't give an answer, and it doesn't need to, because regardless of whether they're together or not, the situation itself is heartbreaking enough. Would they have had a 'happily ever after' if the financial and societal factors have been different? On any other given sitcom there would have been a resolve, there would have been a happy ending. But sometimes an ending isn't an ending — and that's a whole different kind of heartbreaking." Bryan Washington of Vulture gave the episode a perfect 5 star rating out of 5 and wrote, "It means something, I think, that as Van watches Earn pull away from the window, there's loss but not sadness. She doesn't linger. She's on to her next move. And I deeply, deeply hope we get to see what that next move is. Because if Robbin’ Season has shown us a collection of people who lose things, or have things taken from them, Van is the first character this season to come out clean on the other side."

Leigh-Anne Jackson of The New York Times wrote, "The game seemed so simple, yet they seemed unbelievably impressed by his performance. Had he actually won? Or were they just making a fool of him? This was yet another scene paying homage to Get Out." Jacob Oller of Paste gave the episode an 8.8 out of 10 rating and wrote, "Equally scary is the finality of it all. The arbitrary, exhausted finality of the penultimate scene is the unavoidable depression of a breakup that's been seen coming, plastered over, and rotted hollow. They've been tangled in this game too long for its participants to ignore. Now that the game is ended, it's clear both players were experts, but the only way either could win was to stop playing." Miles Surrey of The Ringer wrote, "'Helen' culminates with Earn staidly escorting Van to her apartment door, the dynamic moving forward a series of business transactions about shared bills and their daughter. At least for now. Nothing in Atlanta is ever really set in stone — even before 'Robbin’ Season' started — and for every step a character seemingly takes, there's something that takes them two steps back. There's nothing surreal about that; it's just human."

=== Accolades ===
TVLine named Zazie Beetz as an honorable mention as the "Performer of the Week" for the week of March 24, 2018, for her performance in the episode. The site wrote, "In their breakup scene, Beetz didn't have to scream and cry to get her point across; instead, she was quietly resolute as Van firmly told Earn, 'I want to be in a relationship where I'm valued as a human being, and not as an accessory you can f—k.' Let's just hope Van and Earn's split doesn't mean this is the last we'll see of Beetz's deep, delicate performance." Beetz additionally earned a nomination for Supporting Actress in a Comedy Series at the 70th Primetime Emmy Awards.
