= A Farewell =

- What We Do in the Shadows episode
- Episode no.: Season 3 Episode 9
- Directed by: Tig Fong
- Written by: Sam Johnson; Stefani Robinson; Marika Sawyer; Paul Simms
- Cinematography by: David A. Makin
- Editing by: Dane McMaster; Wendy Nomiyama
- Production code: XWS03009
- Original air date: October 21, 2021
- Running time: 26 minutes

Guest appearances
- Donal Logue as Himself; Khandi Alexander as Contessa Carmilla De Mornay; David Cross as Dominykas the Dreadful; Kristen Schaal as The Guide

Episode chronology
← Previous "The Wellness Center"	Next → "The Portrait"

"A Farewell" is the ninth episode of the third season of the American mockumentary comedy horror television series What We Do in the Shadows, set in the franchise of the same name. It is the 29th overall episode of the series and was written by co-executive producer Sam Johnson, executive producer Stefani Robinson, co-executive producer Marika Sawyer, and executive producer Paul Simms, and directed by Tig Fong. It was released on FX on October 21, 2021.

The series is set in Staten Island, New York City. Like the 2014 film, the series follows the lives of vampires in the city. These consist of three vampires, Nandor, Laszlo, and Nadja. They live alongside Colin Robinson, an energy vampire; and Guillermo, Nandor's familiar. The series explores the absurdity and misfortunes experienced by the vampires. In the episode, Nandor decides to take a "Super Slumber", a vampire hibernation, while the vampires are visited by a delegation of old vampires.

According to Nielsen Media Research, the episode was seen by an estimated 0.272 million household viewers and gained a 0.09 ratings share among adults aged 18–49. The episode received critical acclaim, with critics praising the episode's themes, tone and surprise ending.

== Plot ==
The vampires have progressed in curing Nandor (Kayvan Novak) of his brainwash. Nevertheless, Nandor announces that he has chosen to do a "Super Slumber", a process in which a vampire will sleep for up to 300 years. The vampires are devastated at the news, especially Colin Robinson (Mark Proksch), who feels that Nandor is doing it to avoid attending his 100th birthday party.

After putting Nandor to sleep, the vampires are informed by the Guide (Kristen Schaal) that a delegation of old vampires are visiting them to see their progress as part of the Vampiric Council. As they need both co-leaders, Guillermo (Harvey Guillén) wakes up a reluctant Nandor to appear. Nandor renounces his position, making Nadja (Natasia Demetriou) the sole leader and returning to sleep, telling her to inform them she killed him for a misdemeanor. The old vampires arrive, which includes Contessa Carmilla De Mornay (Khandi Alexander), Dominykas the Dreadful (David Cross), Dominykas' human friend Coco (Samantha Helt), and actor Donal Logue, who turned into a vampire after filming Blade. During dinner, Nadja states she killed Nandor for questioning her leadership. This impresses the old vampires, but they still demand to see the body. Guillermo warns Nandor, but he simply stays in his coffin to be seen by the old vampires.

The old vampires are convinced of his death, and start making disparaging comments about Nandor. They then make Guillermo reveal Nandor's penis, as it is said to be revered for its size. They are unimpressed with its average size, with Dominykas even touching it just to confirm it. After they leave, Nandor demands Guillermo to seal his casket again. Laszlo (Matt Berry) interrupts the dinner to make a speech on Colin Robinson's birthday, which annoys Nadja. When the guests leave, Nadja confronts Laszlo about it, to which he reveals that Colin Robinson will die by sunrise. He reveals that he discovered a page in the Vampiric Council Library that reveals that energy vampires only live to 100 years. Laszlo didn't inform Colin Robinson, instead he decided to spend more time with him in his last months of life. Colin Robinson retreats to his bedroom, where his condition is worsening. The vampires accompany him, so Guillermo wakes Nandor up so he can say farewell. When they reach the bedroom, Colin Robinson has already passed away. Nandor is not convinced, as Colin Robinson faked his death many times. He tries to prove his point, but he accidentally crushes Colin Robinson's head with his hand.

== Production ==
=== Development ===
In September 2021, FX confirmed that the ninth episode of the season would be titled "A Farewell", and that it would be written by co-executive producer Sam Johnson, executive producer Stefani Robinson, co-executive producer Marika Sawyer, and executive producer Paul Simms, and directed by Tig Fong. This was Johnson's fourth writing credit, Robinson's sixth writing credit, Sawyer's fourth writing credit, Simms' sixth writing credit, and Fong's first directing credit.

== Reception ==
=== Viewers ===
In its original American broadcast, "A Farewell" was seen by an estimated 0.272 million household viewers with a 0.09 in the 18-49 demographics. This means that 0.09 percent of all households with televisions watched the episode. This was a slight decrease in viewership from the previous episode, which was watched by 0.287 million household viewers with a 0.09 in the 18-49 demographics.

=== Critical reviews ===
"A Farewell" received critical acclaim. Katie Rife of The A.V. Club gave the episode a "B+" grade and wrote, "As What We Do In The Shadows approaches the end of its fourth season, the show is putting aside standalone adventures like the excellent 'The Casino' and 'The Escape' for a multi-part storyline bringing together the season's core themes. And, following a pattern established back in season one, it's pulled in multiple writers to do so."

Tony Sokol of Den of Geek gave the episode a 4 star rating out of 5 and wrote, "This is What We Do in the Shadows season 3's penultimate episode, and the ending is a shock. Is this any way to celebrate Colin's centennial? Punching a hole in his face which looks like you ripped the center out of a birthday cake? [...] It ends on the most casual cliffhanger which could be a gamechanger for the entire series. The episode takes delicious twists and turns, and knocks the air out of you at the end."

Melody McCune of Telltale TV gave the episode a 4.5 star rating out of 5 and wrote, "'A Farewell' leaves plenty of unanswered questions as we go into next week’s season finale while presenting an episode laden with plenty of hysterical moments and top-tier guest appearances from David Cross and Donal Logue. Secondly, brilliant performances from the main cast, and even a smattering of heart thrown in for good measure." Alejandra Bodden of Bleeding Cool gave the episode a 9 out of 10 rating and wrote, "This week's episode of FX's What We Do in the Shadows, "A Farewell", was just... WOW! Unexpected and incredibly surprising and heartbreaking. Just... wow."
