= Walk This Way (disambiguation) =

"Walk This Way" is a song by Aerosmith.

Walk This Way may also refer to:

== Music ==
- Walk This Way (album), a 2008 album by The White Tie Affair
- "Walk This Way" (MØ song), 2014
- "Walk This Way" (Daniel Ash song), 1991

== Other uses ==
- "Walk this way" (humor), a recurrent pun in some movies and television shows
- Walk This Way: The Autobiography of Aerosmith, a 1997 book by Stephen Davis
- "Walk This Way" (Ray Donovan), a 2014 television episode
- "Walk This Way", an episode of the TV series Pocoyo
- "Walk This Way", the 16th episode of the animated series W.I.T.C.H.
