= Young Frankenstein =

1974 film by Mel Brooks

- Theatrical release poster by John Alvin
- Directed by: Mel Brooks
- Written by: Gene Wilder; Mel Brooks
- Based on: Frankenstein (1818 novel) by Mary Shelley
- Produced by: Michael Gruskoff
- Starring: Gene Wilder; Peter Boyle; Marty Feldman; Cloris Leachman; Teri Garr; Kenneth Mars; Madeline Kahn
- Cinematography: Gerald Hirschfeld
- Edited by: John C. Howard
- Music by: John Morris
- Production companies: Gruskoff/Venture Films; Crossbow Productions, Inc.; Jouer Limited
- Distributed by: 20th Century Fox
- Release date: December 15, 1974
- Running time: 105 minutes
- Country: United States
- Language: English
- Budget: $2.78 million
- Box office: $86.4 million

Young Frankenstein is a 1974 American comedy horror film directed by Mel Brooks. The screenplay was co-written by Brooks and Gene Wilder. Wilder also starred in the lead role as the title character, a descendant of the infamous Victor Frankenstein. Peter Boyle portrayed the monster. The film co-stars Teri Garr, Cloris Leachman, Marty Feldman, Madeline Kahn, Kenneth Mars, Richard Haydn, and Gene Hackman.

The film is a parody of the classic horror film genre, in particular the various film adaptations of Mary Shelley's 1818 novel Frankenstein; or, The Modern Prometheus produced by Universal Pictures in the 1930s. Much of the lab equipment used as props was created by Kenneth Strickfaden for the 1931 film Frankenstein. To help evoke the atmosphere of the earlier films, Brooks shot the picture entirely in black and white, a rarity in the 1970s, and employed 1930s-style opening credits and scene transitions such as iris outs, wipes, and fades to black. The film also features a period score by Brooks' longtime composer John Morris.

Young Frankenstein was released by 20th Century Fox on December 15, 1974. A critical and commercial success, Young Frankenstein ranks number 28 on Total Film magazine's readers' "List of the 50 Greatest Comedy Films of All Time", No. 56 on Bravo's list of the "100 Funniest Movies", and No. 13 on the American Film Institute's list of the 100 funniest American movies. In 2003, it was deemed "culturally, historically or aesthetically significant" by the United States National Film Preservation Board, and selected for preservation in the Library of Congress National Film Registry. It was later adapted by Brooks and Thomas Meehan as a stage musical. The film was nominated for two Academy Awards: Best Adapted Screenplay (for Wilder and Brooks) and Best Sound.

In 2014, the year of its 40th anniversary, Brooks considered it by far his finest (although not his funniest) film as a writer-director. As of 2026, a prequel television series is in the works at FX.

== Plot ==
Early in the 20th century, Frederick Frankenstein, a lecturing physician at an American medical school, is actively distancing himself from his grandfather Victor Frankenstein, the infamous mad scientist, pronouncing his surname as "Fronkensteen". When Frederick inherits the family castle in Transylvania, he travels to Europe to inspect the property. At the Transylvania train station, Frederick is met by a hunchbacked, bug-eyed servant named Igor, whose own grandfather worked for Victor and who states his name is pronounced "Eye-gore". A woman named Inga also greets him. Arriving at the estate, Frederick meets Frau Blücher, the dour, intimidating housekeeper. After discovering the secret entrance to Victor's laboratory and reading his private journals, Frederick resumes his grandfather's experiments in reanimating the dead.

Frederick and Igor steal a recently executed criminal's corpse. He sends Igor to steal the brain of a deceased "scientist and saint" named Hans Delbrück. Igor accidentally destroys Delbrück's brain and takes one labeled "Abnormal" instead. Frederick unknowingly transplants it into the corpse and brings the Monster to life. Frightened by Igor lighting a match, the Monster attacks Frederick and nearly strangles him before being sedated.

Unaware the Monster exists, the townspeople gather to discuss their unease at Frederick continuing his grandfather's work. Inspector Kemp, a one-eyed police inspector with a prosthetic arm and a heavy German accent, visits the doctor's and demands assurance that Frederick would not create another monster. Returning to the lab, Frederick discovers Blücher releasing the creature. She reveals the Monster's love of violin music, her own romantic relationship with Frederick's grandfather, and her planning out the events that inspired Frederick to create a monster as Victor did. The Monster becomes enraged by electrical sparks from a thrown switch and escapes the castle. While roaming the countryside, the Monster interacts with a young girl and a blind, hermetic monk. Frederick recaptures the Monster and locks himself in a room with him. He calms the Monster's homicidal tendencies with flattery and a promise to guide him to success, embracing his heritage as a Frankenstein.

At a theater filled with prominent guests, Frederick shows "The Creature" following simple commands, then performs "Puttin' On the Ritz" with him. During the performance, a stage light explodes and frightens the Monster, who becomes enraged at the booing crowd, and charges at them when they throw rotten vegetables. He is captured and chained by police. Back in the laboratory, Inga attempts to comfort Frederick; they have sex on the suspended reanimation table.

The Monster escapes from prison the same night Elizabeth, Frederick's socialite fiancée, arrives unexpectedly. The Monster takes her captive, but she falls in love with him as he has sex with her. While the townspeople hunt the Monster, Frederick plays the violin and Igor plays the horn to lure his creation back to the castle and recaptures him. Just as the Kemp-led mob storms the laboratory, Frederick transfers some of his stabilizing intellect to the Monster, who reasons with and placates the mob. Kemp gives the Monster a warm reception.

Sometime later, Frederick and Inga are wed and Elizabeth marries the now-sophisticated Monster. While in bed with Frederick, Inga asks what he got in return during the transfer procedure. Frederick growls wordlessly like the monster and embraces Inga while Igor plays the horn on the roof.

== Cast ==
- Gene Wilder as Dr. Frederick Frankenstein, the grandson of Victor Frankenstein.
- Peter Boyle as the Monster, a creature made from the corpse of an executed criminal.
- Marty Feldman as Igor, a hunchbacked servant of Frederick Frankenstein, and grandson of the original Igor who worked with Victor.
- Cloris Leachman as Frau Blücher, the housekeeper of the Frankenstein estate.
- Teri Garr as Inga, a young woman who becomes Frederick's assistant.
- Kenneth Mars as Inspector Kemp, a one-eyed police inspector with a prosthetic arm. He is a parody of Krogh, a similarly one-armed inspector in Son of Frankenstein.
- Madeline Kahn as Elizabeth, Frederick's fiancée.
- Richard Haydn as Herr Gerhardt Falkstein, a lawyer.
- Richard A. Roth as Inspector Kemp's aide.
- Monte Landis and Rusty Blitz as the Gravediggers.
- Gene Hackman as Harold, the blind man.
- Liam Dunn as Mr. Hilltop.
- Danny Goldman as Medical student
- Oscar Beregi as Sadistic jailer
- Arthur Malet as Village elder
- Anne Beesley as Helga
- Michael Fox as Helga's father
- Rolfe Sedan as Train conductor
- Norbert Schiller as Theatre emcee

Uncredited

- Mel Brooks as:
  - Werewolf
  - Cat Hit by Dart
  - Victor Frankenstein (voice)
- Lou Cutell as Frightened Villager
- Ian Abercrombie as Second Villager
- Clement von Franckenstein as Screaming Villager
- Berry Kroeger as Village Elder

== Background ==
In a 2010 interview with the Los Angeles Times, Mel Brooks discussed how the film came about:

I was in the middle of shooting the last few weeks of Blazing Saddles somewhere in the Antelope Valley, and Gene Wilder and I were having a cup of coffee, and he said, 'I have this idea that there could be another Frankenstein.' I said, 'Not another! We've had the son of, the cousin of, the brother-in-law. We don't need another Frankenstein.' His idea was very simple: What if the grandson of Dr. Frankenstein wanted nothing to do with the family whatsoever. He was ashamed of those wackos. I said, 'That's funny.'

Brooks and Gene Wilder designed the film as both a parody and homage to the Universal Monsters films of the 1930s and 1940s. To recreate the visual style of the original Universal horror films, Brooks shot in black and white, employed vintage-style opening credits, used wipes and irises for scene transitions, and even used the original Kenneth Strickfaden lab equipment from the 1931 Frankenstein.

In one of the scenes of a village assembly, one of the authority figures says that he already knows what Frankenstein is up to, based on five previous experiences. This is a reference to the first five Universal films. In a Gene Wilder DVD interview, he says the film is based on Frankenstein (1931), Bride of Frankenstein (1935), Son of Frankenstein (1939), and The Ghost of Frankenstein (1942).

== Production ==
=== Writing and development ===
In a 2016 interview with Creative Screenwriting, Brooks elaborated on the writing process. He recalled,

Little by little, every night, Gene and I met at his bungalow at the Bel Air Hotel. We ordered a pot of Earl Grey tea coupled with a container of cream and a small kettle of brown sugar cubes. To go with it, we had a pack of British digestive biscuits. And step-by-step, ever so cautiously, we proceeded on a dark, narrow, twisting path to the eventual screenplay in which good sense and caution are thrown out the window and madness ensues.

Brooks and Wilder disagreed over the sequence where Frankenstein and his creation perform "Puttin' on the Ritz". Brooks felt it was too silly to have the monster sing and dance, but eventually yielded to Wilder's arguments.

Brooks and producer Michael Gruskoff originally agreed to a deal with Columbia Pictures, but Columbia would not agree to a budget of more than $1.75 million, whereas Brooks wanted at least $2.3 million. Columbia also was not happy making it in black and white, so Brooks and Gruskoff instead went to 20th Century-Fox for distribution when they agreed to a higher budget.

=== Casting ===
Unlike in many of his other films, Brooks does not appear onscreen in a significant role in Young Frankenstein, though he recorded several voice parts and portrays a Transylvanian villager in one short scene. In 2012, Brooks explained why:

I wasn't allowed to be in it. That was the deal Gene Wilder had. He [said], 'If you're not in it, I'll do it.' [Laughs.] He [said], "You have a way of breaking the fourth wall, whether you want to or not. I just want to keep it. I don't want too much to be, you know, a wink at the audience. I love the script.' He wrote the script with me. That was the deal. So I wasn't in it, and he did it.

Marty Feldman, who made his American film debut as Igor, added a comic twist to his character by swapping which side the hump on his back was located; when Doctor Frankenstein asks him about it, Igor replies simply: "What hump?" Wilder wrote the role specially for Feldman.

Teri Garr originally auditioned for the role of Elizabeth. Brooks was committed to casting his oft-collaborator Madeline Kahn, but was impressed by Garr's audition and offered her the part of Inga.

John Carradine and Leon Askin both had roles that were cut from the final film. Carradine was the (off-screen) voice of the late Dr. Frankenstein, and Askin was Herr Waldman, an executor of the Baron's will.

Clement von Franckenstein, a member of the real-life House of Franckenstein from which Mary Shelley derived the title of her novel, appeared in the film as an extra. At the time, Franckenstein had adopted the stage name "Clement St. George", fearing his real surname would hurt his acting career.

=== Filming ===
Principal photography began on February 19, 1974, and wrapped on May 3, 1974. The majority of the film was shot on sets at the 20th Century Fox and MGM studio backlots. The only scenes to be shot on-location were Frederick Frankenstein's introduction (filmed at the University of Southern California) and the "Puttin' on the Ritz" sequence (at the Mayfair Music Hall in Santa Monica).

According to cinematographer Gerald Hirschfeld, Fox executives were reluctant to shoot the entire film in black-and-white, and Hirschfeld even proposed a compromise where the film would begin in black-and-white before transitioning into color. Brooks remained firm.

Kenneth Strickfaden's original lab equipment created for the Frankenstein (1931) was used. When Mel Brooks approached him, Strickfaden was semi-retired, and storing all the equipment in his home garage. Strickfaden agreed to lend his equipment to the production on the condition that he be specially credited, as he had never been credited for his contributions to the original film. Though he was originally only hired as a distant consultant, Strickfaden wound up working regularly on the set, even devising new pieces for use in the film.

== Release ==
=== Home media ===
Young Frankenstein became available on DVD on November 3, 1998. The film was then released on DVD for the second time on September 5, 2006. The film was then released on DVD for the third time on September 9, 2014, as a 40th-anniversary edition along with a Blu-ray release.

== Reception ==
=== Box office ===
Young Frankenstein was a box-office success upon release. The film grossed $86.4 million on a $2.78 million budget.

=== Critical response ===
Young Frankenstein received acclaim from critics and currently holds a 95% fresh rating on Rotten Tomatoes based on 73 reviews, with an average rating of 8.60/10. The consensus reads, "Made with obvious affection for the original, Young Frankenstein is a riotously silly spoof featuring a fantastic performance by Gene Wilder."

Vincent Canby of The New York Times called the film "Mel Brooks' funniest, most cohesive comedy to date," adding, "It would be misleading to describe 'Young Frankenstein,' written by Mr. Wilder and Mr. Brooks, as astoundingly witty, but it's a great deal of low fun of the sort that Mr. Brooks specializes in." Roger Ebert gave the film a full four stars, calling it Brooks' "most disciplined and visually inventive film (it also happens to be very funny)." Gene Siskel gave the film three stars out of four and wrote, "Part homage and part send-up, 'Young Frankenstein' is very funny in its best moments, but they're all too infrequent." Variety declared, "The screen needs one outrageously funny Mel Brooks film each year, and Young Frankenstein is an excellent followup for the enormous audiences that howled for much of 1974 at Blazing Saddles."

Charles Champlin of the Los Angeles Times praised the film as "a likable, unpredictable blending of slapstick and sentiment." Gary Arnold of The Washington Post, who disliked Blazing Saddles, reported being "equally untickled" with Young Frankenstein and wrote that "Wilder and Brooks haven't dreamed up a funny plot. They simply rely on the old movie plots to get them through a rambling collection of scene parodies and a more or less constant stream of puns, double entendres and other verbal rib-pokers and thigh-slappers." Tom Milne of the UK's The Monthly Film Bulletin wrote in a mixed review that "all too often Brooks resorts to the most clichéd sort of Carry On smut" and criticized Marty Feldman's "grotesquely unfunny mugging," but praised a couple of sequences (the flower-throwing scene and the Monster's encounter with the blind man) as "very close to brilliance" and called Peter Boyle as the Monster "one of the undiluted pleasures of the film (and the only actor ever to suggest that he might play the part as well as Karloff)." Leonard Maltin gave it three and a half of four stars: "One of the funniest (and most quotable) movies of all time, a finely tuned parody of old FRANKENSTEIN pictures ... " Leslie Halliwell gave it two of four stars: "The most successful of Mel Brooks' parodies, Mad Magazine style; the gleamingly reminiscent photography is the best of it, the script being far from consistently funny, but there are splendid moments."

In his book Comedy-Horror Films: A Chronological History, 1914–2008, Bruce G. Hallenbeck lauded many of Young Frankenstein's scenes as classic comedy moments, and also praised the attention to detail the film shows in paying heartfelt homage to the classic horror films it references. He summed up that "Young Frankenstein is a movie for film buffs, but written, directed, and performed in such a way that average Joes and Josephines can enjoy it just as much for its outrageous and wacky humor."

=== Awards and nominations ===
Institution	Year	Category	Nominees	Result
Academy Awards	1975	Best Adapted Screenplay	Mel Brooks, Gene Wilder	Nominated
Academy Awards	1975	Best Sound	Richard Portman, Gene Cantamessa	Nominated
Golden Globes	1975	Best Actress in a Motion Picture – Musical or Comedy	Cloris Leachman	Nominated
Golden Globes	1975	Best Supporting Actress – Motion Picture	Madeline Kahn	Nominated
Hugo Awards	1975	Best Dramatic Presentation	Mel Brooks, Gene Wilder, Mary Shelley	Won
Nebula Awards	1976	Best Script	Mel Brooks, Gene Wilder	Won
New York Film Critics Circle	1974	Best Supporting Actress	Madeline Kahn	Nominated
Saturn Awards	1976	Best Horror Film	Young Frankenstein	Won
Saturn Awards	1976	Best Director	Mel Brooks	Won
Saturn Awards	1976	Best Supporting Actor	Marty Feldman	Won
Saturn Awards	1976	Best Make-up	William Tuttle	Won
Saturn Awards	1976	Best Production Design	Robert De Vestel, Dale Hennesy	Won
Writers Guild of America Awards	1975	Best Adapted Screenplay	Mel Brooks, Gene Wilder	Nominated

==== Other honors ====
The film is recognized by American Film Institute in these lists:

- 2000: AFI's 100 Years...100 Laughs – #13
- 2004: AFI's 100 Years...100 Songs:
  - "Puttin' on the Ritz" – #89
- 2005: AFI's 100 Years...100 Movie Quotes:
  - Igor: "What hump?" – Nominated
- 2005: AFI's 100 Years of Film Scores – Nominated
- 2007: AFI's 100 Years...100 Movies (10th Anniversary Edition) – Nominated

In 2003, Young Frankenstein was deemed "culturally, historically or aesthetically significant" by the United States National Film Preservation Board, and selected for preservation in the Library of Congress National Film Registry.

== Subsequent media ==
=== Stage musical adaptation ===
Brooks adapted the film into a musical of the same name, which premiered in Seattle at the Paramount Theatre and ran from August 7 to September 1, 2007. The musical opened on Broadway at the Lyric Theatre (then the Hilton Theatre) on November 8, 2007, and closed on January 4, 2009. It was nominated for three Tony Awards, and starred Roger Bart, Sutton Foster, Shuler Hensley, Megan Mullally, Christopher Fitzgerald, and Andrea Martin.

The musical version was to be used as the basis of a live-broadcast event on the ABC network in the last quarter of 2020, with Brooks producing, but it was cancelled due to the COVID-19 pandemic.

=== Television series spin-off ===
In June 2025, it was announced that a continuation spin-off television series titled Very Young Frankenstein was in the works at FX. Stefani Robinson will serve as the writer and will also be an executive producer along with Taika Waititi and Garrett Basch with Waititi directing the pilot episode. All three were alumni from the FX series What We Do in the Shadows. Mel Brooks will also serve as an executive producer along with his producing partner Kevin Salter and Michael Gruskoff who produced the original film.

In September 2025, it was confirmed that Zach Galifianakis will play Dr. Frankenstein while Cary Elwes has signed on to play the President of the United States. Kumail Nanjiani, Dolly Wells, Nikki Crawford and Spencer House have also been confirmed to appear in the pilot episode in unknown roles. It is intended that upon a series order, it would air on Hulu.

In May 2026, FX and Hulu ordered the pilot to series.

== Legacy ==
=== Influence on music ===
Igor's line "Walk this way" in the film inspired the song of the same name by Aerosmith. According to Gene Wilder, the joke was added while shooting the scene by Mel Brooks, inspired by the old "talcum powder" joke. A partially contradictory account appears in eyE Marty, Feldman's posthumously published autobiography: Feldman recalls spontaneously doing the "walk this way" shtick to make his colleagues laugh, with Brooks then insisting, despite Wilder and Feldman's reservations, that it stay in the film. On the 2006 DVD, in the extras feature "Making FrankenSense of Young Frankenstein" (section 9, "Fine Tuning"), assistant editors Bill Gordean and Stan Allen offer additional information about its final inclusion, saying that just before the preview Brooks himself wanted to remove it (calling it a "cheap joke," as Feldman in his book says he and Wilder did), but Allen convinced him to keep it in for the preview. Because the preview audience gave it a big laugh it stayed.

One of the most popular Finnish rock bands Eppu Normaali took their name from the movie. It is a translation of the name "Abby Normal" Igor uses to describe the abnormal brain he stole for the monster.

== See also ==
- List of American films of 1974
- List of films featuring Frankenstein's monster
