= Very Young Frankenstein =

Upcoming American comedy horror series

- Genre: Comedy horror
- Created by: Stefani Robinson
- Based on: Young Frankenstein by: Gene Wilder; Mel Brooks; Frankenstein; Mary Shelley
- Showrunner: Stefani Robinson
- Starring: Zach Galifianakis; Dolly Wells; Spencer House; Nikki Crawford; Kumail Nanjiani; Cary Elwes
- Country of origin: United States
- Original language: English

Production
- Executive producers: Stefani Robinson; Taika Waititi; Garrett Basch; Mel Brooks; Kevin Salter; Michael Gruskoff
- Production companies: Waititi; Dive; Brooksfilms Limited; 20th Television

Original release
- Network: FX; FX on Hulu

Very Young Frankenstein is an upcoming television series created by Stefani Robinson for FX. It is based on the 1974 film Young Frankenstein directed by Mel Brooks.

== Cast ==
- Zach Galifianakis
- Dolly Wells
- Spencer House
- Nikki Crawford
- Kumail Nanjiani
- Cary Elwes as the President of the United States

== Production ==
=== Development ===
On June 25, 2025, Deadline Hollywood reported that a comedy series based on the 1974 film Young Frankenstein was nearing a pilot order with Stefani Robinson set to write, showrun, and executive produce alongside Taika Waititi, who is set to direct the pilot, Garrett Basch, Mel Brooks, who directed the original film, Kevin Salter, and Michael Gruskoff, who produced the original film. On May 18, 2026, it was announced that the pilot was picked up to series.

=== Casting ===
On September 2, 2025, Deadline Hollywood reported that Cary Elwes was nearing a deal to star in the series, where he will play the President of the United States. On September 30, 2025, Zach Galifianakis, Dolly Wells, Spencer House, Nikki Crawford, Kumail Nanjiani joined the cast.

=== Filming ===
The production started on November 2, 2026 and will wrap on December 17. Filming is taking place in Vancouver.
