= Robert S. Powell III =

American comedian

Robert Powell III
- Born: 20th century Monroe, Louisiana, U.S.
- Other name: RP3
- Education: University of Louisiana at Monroe; Texas Christian University
- Occupation: Comedian

Robert Powell III (born 20th century) is an American stand-up comedian and political satirist.

He is known for his work as part of Shaquille O'Neal's All-Star Comedy Jam, on HBO's All Def Comedy, and for his appearance in an episode of Atlanta on FX.

== Biography ==
Powell attended the University of Louisiana at Monroe, and has a master's degree in political science from Texas Christian University. He was Deputy Chief of Staff to the mayor of his hometown, Monroe, Louisiana; Special Assistant to Louisiana Governor Bobby Jindal, and Chief of Staff to Secretary of Labor Johnny Myles Riley. Powell serves as president and executive director of his grandfather's foundation.

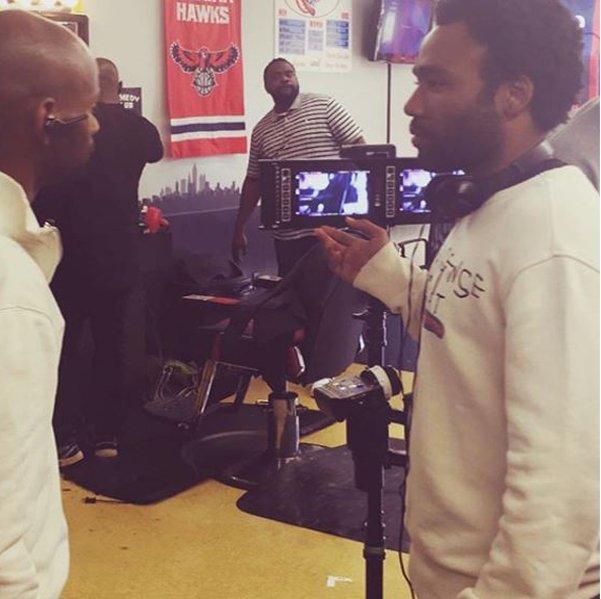
Robert Powell III on the set of Atlanta with director Donald Glover

Powell portrayed the barber Bibby in season 2, episode 5 of Atlanta, which received a nomination for a Primetime Emmy Award for Outstanding Writing for a Comedy Series at the 70th Primetime Emmy Awards. In March 2019, Uber Eats selected Powell to serve as advertising spokesperson "Randy Watkins" for UberEats March Madness Campaign. He has also appeared in Adidas' James Harden's "Free to Be Campaign" and Starbucks' 2020 Christmas Cup Campaign.
