= Is My Palm Read =

1933 film

- Directed by: Dave Fleischer
- Produced by: Max Fleischer
- Starring: Mae Questel; Billy Murray
- Animation by: David Tendlar; William Henning
- Color process: Black-and-white
- Production company: Fleischer Studios
- Distributed by: Paramount Publix Corporation
- Release date: February 17, 1933
- Running time: 7 minutes
- Country: United States
- Language: English

Is My Palm Read is a 1933 Pre-Code Fleischer Studios animated short film starring Betty Boop, and featuring Koko the Clown and Bimbo.

== Plot ==
Act One. A modestly dressed Betty visits the shop of an elderly, swami-like fortune teller named Professor Bimbo for some advice, but Bimbo is only interested in making time with Betty. Koko the Clown is the swami's assistant.

Act Two. Bimbo shows Betty images of herself in a crystal ball. After reliving her infancy, this vision of Betty is shipwrecked on a jungle island, where she loses her clothing and fashions a scanty "hula girl" bikini to cover herself. She sings the first few lines of the Irving Berlin song "All by Myself", before being abducted by evil ghosts (perhaps Poltergeists) who imprison her in a jungle cabin. Fortunately, she is rescued by a young, strong sailor, who just happened to be exploring the island on horseback.

Act Three. Back in the fortune teller's shop, Betty is horrified by the vision, but the "elderly" swami removes his fake beard and reveals himself to be the heroic sailor. A happy Betty embraces him lovingly, but their reunion is disrupted by the ghosts from the vision, who burst out of the crystal ball and chase the two through a time portal, back to the desert isle. The head ghost rips off Betty's dress to reveal the hula bikini. Betty and Bimbo escape from the ghosts by tricking them into running off a cliff into the sea. The short ends on an unresolved, but optimistic, cliffhanger.

== Alternate versions ==
This short was hand-colorized for a 1972 re-release. Colorized prints (mainly television prints) by Fred Ladd's Color Systems are missing several scenes, including three risqué "pre-Code" clips.

- Professor Bimbo's shop has a neon sign which malfunctions to show a mildly obscene hand gesture.
- A strategically placed light reveals the nude outline of Betty's healthy chorus-girl legs under her modest floor-length dress, and she starts dancing like Little Egypt. The cut to this scene also loses the "walk this way" gag.
- Bimbo's crystal ball shows a nude baby Betty taking a bath.
- The hand-shaped waves that wash Betty to shore on an island grab her backside, and she says "Keep your hands to you!" Then she walks ashore and takes off her wet outer clothes out of sight behind what appears to be a boulder, but it turns out to be a turtle that sticks out its head and legs and walks off, exposing Betty in her girdle and bra, while Irving Berlin's song begins to play on the soundtrack. She blushes and runs behind some shrubs, where she puts on a skirt made of palm fronds to make a hula girl costume. She emerges from the bush and sings the first few lines of Berlin's song, before being abducted by ghosts. The cut version jumps straight from her landing on the beach to the first line of her song, leaving her costume change inexplicable. She remains in the hula girl costume for the remainder of the short, except for a brief interlude in Bimbo's shop wearing her modest dress before a ghost rips it from her body to reveal the bikini - a moment which is not censored.
- When the island ghosts are introduced, the final one shown is a "Jewish moneylender" stock character, who becomes invisible in the cut version.

In the 1980s and 1990s, VHS editions usually restored the short to its original black and white appearance, but retained most or all of the above cuts.
