= Barbershop (Atlanta) =

- Atlanta episode
- Episode no.: Season 2 Episode 5
- Directed by: Donald Glover
- Written by: Stefani Robinson
- Cinematography by: Christian Sprenger
- Editing by: Kyle Reiter
- Production code: XAA02004
- Original air date: March 29, 2018
- Running time: 25 minutes

Guest appearance
- Robert Powell III as Bibby

Episode chronology
← Previous "Helen"	Next → "Teddy Perkins"
- Atlanta season 2

"Barbershop" is the fifth episode of the second season of the American comedy-drama television series Atlanta. It is the 15th overall episode of the series and was written by producer Stefani Robinson, and directed by series creator and main star Donald Glover. It was first broadcast on FX in the United States on March 29, 2018.

The series is set in Atlanta and follows Earnest "Earn" Marks, as he tries to redeem himself in the eyes of his ex-girlfriend Van, who is also the mother of his daughter Lottie; as well as his parents and his cousin Alfred, who raps under the stage name "Paper Boi"; and Darius, Alfred's eccentric right-hand man. In the episode, Alfred meets with his regular barber for a haircut. However, the barber convinces Alfred to help him with some errands, which escalates into some bizarre events that infuriate Alfred as he needs the haircut.

According to Nielsen Media Research, the episode was seen by an estimated 0.607 million household viewers and gained a 0.3 ratings share among adults aged 18–49. The episode received extremely positive reviews from critics, with praise going to Brian Tyree Henry's performance, humor and final scene, although some viewed the episode as a "filler" episode compared to the theme of the season. For the episode, Robinson received an Outstanding Writing for a Comedy Series nomination at the 70th Primetime Emmy Awards.

== Plot ==
Alfred (Brian Tyree Henry) is waiting at a barbershop seat, needing a haircut for an upcoming magazine photoshoot session. His regular barber, Bibby (Robert Powell III), arrives. Bibby constantly talks on his earpiece, making Alfred believe he talks to him. Bibby also procrastinates with cutting his hair, like going to the bathroom and showing Alfred a video of an "invisible car" hitting people on a club's parking lot.

Bibby is then called by his girlfriend and sets out to go to her house, suggesting that Alfred accompany him and promising to cut his hair there. As he has no other barber, Alfred reluctantly goes with him. At his girlfriend's house, Bibby excuses his late arrival on Alfred, claiming that he needed a ride when his car broke down. His girlfriend falls for it, but Alfred is dismayed when Bibby cuts his son's hair first as he claims his schedule was ahead of Alfred's. They leave, just as the house's electricity is cut off, as Bibby didn't pay the bill and then takes money from his girlfriend as payment for the haircut.

Driving back, Bibby offers to take Alfred for some food at Zaxby's for lunch and he agrees. Instead, he takes Alfred to a house under construction, where he gives Alfred the leftovers of a Zaxby's meal he left there. An angry Alfred demands that he takes him to the barbershop, and he promises, but not before asking Alfred to help carry lumber to his truck. As they are finishing, a car pulls up and a woman screams at Bibby, accusing him of stealing the lumber from her property. Bibby claims that he loaned the lumber through her husband and as he didn't pay, he is taking it back, also stating that her husband didn't give them contracts for the job, frustrating her as she calls her husband and the police.

As they return to the barbershop, Bibby notices his son Lamar hanging out with his friends. When they notice him, they flee and Bibby gives chase on his truck. He catches up with them, reprimanding Lamar for skipping school and not putting up the posters he assigned him to do. He calls Alfred to come lecture his kid but Alfred is not in the mood. When Lamar notices Alfred and insults his hair, Alfred angrily steps out and confronts Lamar, telling him about his father's reckless behavior. Lamar is not taken aback; he actually wants Alfred to listen to one of his mixtapes, frustrating him. Bibby then takes Lamar to go with him and Alfred. Bibby talks with Lamar in the truck, and is repeatedly told by Alfred to focus on the road. He then accidentally rear-ends a car. Bibby asks Alfred to claim that he was driving due to his (Bibby's) criminal record, but Alfred refuses as he is still on probation and is carrying marijuana in his pockets. When the driver, an Asian woman, steps out of her car in pain, Bibby decides to drive away in a hit and run.

They finally arrive at the barbershop, where Bibby is called for another meeting. Alfred silently threatens him and he proceeds to cut his hair. Alfred refuses to pay and only does so when Bibby starts claiming that they had "a good day", leaving angrily. After some time passes, Alfred returns to the barbershop, with Bibby waiting for him. Instead, Alfred goes with his new barber, who is just a few feet away from Bibby. As he prepares, Alfred is speechless when he is asked as to what haircut he wants, as he only said "the usual" to Bibby. He then stares at Bibby tending to another person across him.

== Production ==
=== Development ===
"You know how you need a fresh cut but your barber is always on some wack stuff? He's lucky I only trust him."

— Official description in the press release for the episode.

In February 2018, FX announced that the fifth episode of the season would be titled "Barbershop" and that it would be written by producer Stefani Robinson, and directed by series creator and main star Donald Glover. This was Robinson's third writing credit, and Donald Glover's third directing credit.

=== Casting ===
Stand-up comedian Robert Powell III guest stars as Bibby, making the episode his acting debut. Powell was unaware of his character's extended focus on the episode, only receiving the script just two hours before filming started. Thinking he was just an extra, Powell fired his agent and cut ties with his talent agency for the "unprofessional" treatment, saying that instead of the script "what they had been sending me was this travel PDF."

=== Music ===
The episode's score was composed by Flying Lotus and Thundercat. Thundercat was a close collaborator of Donald Glover and was asked to compose the episode. During this, he brought Flying Lotus to help him.

== Reception ==
=== Viewers ===
The episode was watched by 0.607 million viewers, earning a 0.3 in the 18-49 rating demographics on the Nielson ratings scale. This means that 0.3 percent of all households with televisions watched the episode. This was a 21% increase from the previous episode, which was watched by 0.499 million viewers with a 0.3 in the 18-49 demographics.

With DVR factored, the episode was watched by 1.39 million viewers with a 0.8 in the 18-49 demographics.

=== Critical reviews ===
"Barbershop" received extremely positive reviews from critics. The review aggregator website Rotten Tomatoes reported a 90% approval rating for the episode, based on 10 reviews, with an average rating of 8/10.

Matt Miller of Esquire wrote, "As has been a theme for Donald Glover's Atlanta, he's trying to show white audiences the black experience. Some might watch the first 20 minutes of this episode and wonder why Paper Boi is going through all this, but a brilliant final scene doesn't need any words to communicate that, as Parham wrote, 'the relationship the barber has to his artwork, the client, is defined by these moments of tenderness and a genuine, knowing trust.'" Bryan Washington of Vulture gave the episode a 4 star rating out of 5 and wrote, "If 'Helen' excelled in character development, tension, and emotional resonance, 'Barbershop' proves to be a whole other thing. The episode is an extended bit, which would be a pretty big gamble if the jokes were unfunny or dumb, but the paradox of the relationship between black guys and their barbers is a world unto itself, a premise the entire series could've been built on."

Leigh-Anne Jackson of The New York Times wrote, "The 'black barbershop as sacred space' trope isn't new; it's made the rounds in Hollywood, the art world, academia and beyond. Unfortunately for Al, this week's visit to a no-frills strip mall spot is steeped in none of the barbershop's fabled camaraderie, current events catch-ups or stress release. When he stops in to get 'the usual,' what he gets instead is all the worst barbershop experiences rolled into one, then exaggerated to Curb Your Enthusiasm proportions and spun through the signature Atlanta absurdist filter." Jacob Oller of Paste gave the episode an 8.1 out of 10 rating and praised Powell's performance, "Powell has the talented tempo of Chris Tucker on his best days, the hustling charisma of Bernie Mac at his scoundreliest, and the wild desperation of Charlie Day's It's Always Sunny character." Miles Surrey of The Ringer wrote, "Though Atlanta's first season was showered with praise and awarded two Emmys, Henry was notably excluded; he wasn't even nominated. If there's any justice in this world, 'Barbershop' is the showcase that will force the Emmys to recognize Henry this year. And then we'll get something new: Paper Boi, smiling infectiously."

Joshua Alston of The A.V. Club was less positive, giving the episode a "B−" and wrote, "For as much content as 'Barbershop' has, it's ultimately an episode solely about a weird consumer experience that doesn't lend much to the larger story or the Robbin’ Season theme."

=== Accolades ===
TVLine named Brian Tyree Henry as an honorable mention as the "Performer of the Week" for the week of March 31, 2018, for his performance in the episode. The site wrote, "Henry's Alfred just wanted to get his damn hair cut, but his regular barber Bibby instead dragged him all over creation, lying, cheating and stealing his way through an all-day odyssey, with Alfred reluctantly in tow. The two are complete opposites: Bibby is a skinny, high-energy chatterbox, always working on his next hustle, while Alfred is a stoic mountain of a man, suffering in silence. Together, their comedy chemistry was off the charts. Let's just hope Alfred changes his mind and doesn't go find a new barber, so we can see these two in action again soon."
