= Kenneth Strickfaden =

American special effects creator (1896–1984)

Kenneth Strickfaden (May 23, 1896 – February 29, 1984) was an electrician, film set designer, and electrical special effects creator. Beginning with his effects on Frankenstein (1931) he became Hollywood's preeminent electrical special effects expert. He created the science fiction apparatus in more than 100 motion picture films and television programs, from the Frankenstein films to The Wizard of Oz and The Mask of Fu Manchu to television's The Munsters, and his final work, Young Frankenstein (1974).

Ben Burtt utilized Strickfaden's sounds from his equipment (complete with taking the time to record it) for select moments in The Empire Strikes Back and Return of the Jedi.
