= Stefani Robinson =

American screenwriter

- Robinson at the 2022 Toronto International Film Festival
- Education: Emerson College
- Occupations: Screenwriter, producer
- Years active: 2017–present
- Notable work: Chevalier

Stefani Robinson is an American screenwriter and producer. She is best known for her work on FX's Atlanta, for which she won two Writers Guild of America Awards, and was nominated for a Primetime Emmy Award for Outstanding Writing for a Comedy Series. Robinson was a writer and executive producer for the FX television series What We Do in The Shadows, for which she received Emmy nominations for writing, and for Outstanding Comedy Series in 2020 and 2022. She wrote the screenplay for the 2023 biopic Chevalier. (Note: Attributed to multiple sources.)

== Early life and education ==
Robinson moved to the Atlanta suburb of Marietta, Georgia from Hong Kong when she was 8 years old. She watched the series The Mighty Boosh on YouTube as a high school student and described it as helping her develop her own writing style. She names Willy Wonka & the Chocolate Factory, Austin Powers, and Baz Luhrmann’s Romeo + Juliet as other major influences. At some point, at age 15 or 16, she began taking classes and performed sketch comedy for audiences as part of an ensemble at The Second City Training Center in Hollywood. Robinson studied screenwriting as an undergraduate at Emerson College.

== Career ==
Robinson started her career as an assistant at a talent agency. After submitting a script to the television network FX, she was hired to write for Atlanta, where she was the only woman and the youngest person in the writer's room. She has received praise for her writing and has criticized the idea that she should simply offer a “female” perspective to her work as opposed to one of an individual that’s not directly tied to gender or race. Robinson was nominated for a Primetime Emmy Award for the episode "Barbershop".

Robinson signed a production deal with FX in 2017. She has written for several of the network's programs, including Man Seeking Woman and Fargo. Robinson was a co-executive producer and writer for What We Do in the Shadows until she left the show in 2020. During her tenure she received Primetime Emmy Award nominations for the episodes "On the Run" and "The Wellness Center".

Her debut feature film Chevalier, a biopic about the musician of the same name, was released in 2022. It was directed by Stephen Williams and starred Kelvin Harrison Jr.

As of 2023 her pilot for a remake of the British comedy series Peep Show was ordered by FX, starring Minnie Driver and Amandla Jahava, with Yana Gorskaya had been tapped to direct. However John Landgraf, the chairman of the FX Networks, revealed in 2024 that they did not picked up to series.

In June 2025, her pilot Very Young Frankenstein, based on the 1974 film Young Frankenstein, was nearing a pilot order by FX, with Taika Waititi had been tapped to direct. Mel Brooks who wrote the original film, joined the pilot as an executive producer. In September 2025, Cary Elwes, Zach Galifianakis, Dolly Wells, Spencer House, Nikki Crawford, Kumail Nanjiani was cast for the pilot. In May 2026, it was announced that the pilot was picked up to series.

== Filmography ==
Year	Title	Credited as			Notes
Year	Title	Writer	Producer	Director	Notes
2016–2022	Atlanta	Yes	Executive	No	Wrote 6 episodes
2017	Man Seeking Woman	Yes	No	No	Wrote "Bagel" and "Dolphin"; also story editor
2019–2022	What We Do in the Shadows	Yes	Executive	No	Wrote 8 episodes
2020	Fargo	Yes	Yes	No	Co-wrote "The Pretend War"
2022	Chevalier	Yes	Yes	No	
2024	The Union	Uncredited	No	No	
2025	Adults	Yes	Executive	Yes	Co-wrote and directed "Annabelle"

== Awards and nominations ==
Year	Award	Category	Nominated work	Result	Ref.
2017	Writers Guild of America Award	Comedy Series	Atlanta	Won	
2017	Writers Guild of America Award	New Series	Atlanta	Won	
2018	Primetime Emmy Awards	Outstanding Writing for a Comedy Series (for "Barbershop")	Atlanta	Nominated	
2019	Writers Guild of America Award	Comedy Series	Atlanta	Nominated	
2020	Primetime Emmy Awards	Outstanding Writing for a Comedy Series (for "On the Run")	What We Do in the Shadows	Nominated	
2020	Primetime Emmy Awards	Outstanding Comedy Series	What We Do in the Shadows	Nominated	
2020	Writers Guild of America Award	New Series	What We Do in the Shadows	Nominated	
2021	Writers Guild of America Award	Comedy Series	What We Do in the Shadows	Nominated	
2022	Primetime Emmy Awards	Outstanding Writing for a Comedy Series (for "The Wellness Center")	What We Do in the Shadows	Nominated	
2022	Primetime Emmy Awards	Outstanding Comedy Series	What We Do in the Shadows	Nominated	
