= The Wellness Center =

- What We Do in the Shadows episode
- Episode no.: Season 3 Episode 8
- Directed by: Yana Gorskaya
- Written by: Stefani Robinson
- Cinematography by: DJ Stipsen
- Editing by: Antonia de Barros; Yana Gorskaya
- Production code: XWS03008
- Original air date: October 14, 2021
- Running time: 25 minutes

Guest appearances
- Cree Summer as Jan; Kristen Schaal as The Guide

Episode chronology
← Previous "The Siren"	Next → "A Farewell"

"The Wellness Center" is the eighth episode of the third season of the American mockumentary comedy horror television series What We Do in the Shadows, set in the franchise of the same name. It is the 28th overall episode of the series and was written by executive producer Stefani Robinson, and directed by co-executive producer Yana Gorskaya. It was released on FX on October 14, 2021.

The series is set in Staten Island, New York City. Like the 2014 film, the series follows the lives of vampires in the city. These consist of three vampires, Nandor, Laszlo, and Nadja. They live alongside Colin Robinson, an energy vampire; and Guillermo, Nandor's familiar. The series explores the absurdity and misfortunes experienced by the vampires. In the episode, Nandor decides to join a wellness center to cure his vampiric depression.

According to Nielsen Media Research, the episode was seen by an estimated 0.287 million household viewers and gained a 0.09 ratings share among adults aged 18–49. The episode received critical acclaim, with critics praising the humor, character development and themes. The episode received a nomination for Outstanding Writing for a Comedy Series at the 74th Primetime Emmy Awards.

== Plot ==
The vampires prepare to celebrate Nandor (Kayvan Novak) for his annual Accession Day, which recognizes him as Al-Quolanudar's Supreme Viceroy. However, Nandor has fallen into depression, symptom of his immortality affecting his decisions and purpose in life.

To motivate him, Nadja (Natasia Demetriou) asks him to collect overdue bills from Jan (Cree Summer), a vampire. A reluctant Nandor visits Jan at her work, the Post-Chiropteran Wellness Center. Jan claims that she is no longer serving the Council as she, and her clients, are no longer vampires, having removed their own fangs. This surprises Nandor, who is offered the chance to become a human again. He surprises the vampires by announcing that he will join Jan's community, the Formerly Fanged, and leaves the house. As he leaves, Guillermo (Harvey Guillén) asks him to turn into a vampire, but Nandor refuses and releases him from his duties, claiming that he views vampirism as a curse and does not want Guillermo to experience the same problems as him.

One month later, Colin Robinson (Mark Proksch) has taken over Nandor's room, while the rest of the vampires try to deal with his absence. Nandor has enjoyed being part of the community, where they are asked to not use their powers so they can start feeling human. Worried, Guillermo visits the wellness center, where they discover stakes at his bag. As Jan orders the followers to kill Guillermo, he escapes with a reluctant Nandor and fights many vampires until they escape. Guillermo shows the vampires that he has kept Nandor locked in the cage; seeing that he got his fangs removed, the vampires leave to find help in deprogramming him. Back at the wellness center, Jan brings her followers to the rooftop for the final step in becoming humans. However, the followers all die when exposed to sunlight. Jan looks at the camera, stating she will go back to the drawing board, revealing she is still a vampire.

== Production ==
=== Development ===
In September 2021, FX confirmed that the eighth episode of the season would be titled "The Wellness Center", and that it would be written by executive producer Stefani Robinson, and directed by co-executive producer Yana Gorskaya. This was Robinson's fifth writing credit, and Gorskaya's seventh directing credit.

== Reception ==
=== Viewers ===
In its original American broadcast, "The Wellness Center" was seen by an estimated 0.287 million household viewers with a 0.09 in the 18-49 demographics. This means that 0.09 percent of all households with televisions watched the episode. This was a 12% decrease in viewership from the previous episode, which was watched by 0.326 million household viewers with a 0.15 in the 18-49 demographics.

=== Critical reviews ===
"The Wellness Center" received critical acclaim. Katie Rife of The A.V. Club gave the episode an "A–" grade and wrote, "The writing on this week's episode was relatively straightforward, without the florid touches this show sometimes adds to its dialogue. Instead, it relied on performance, from the contortionists in Jan's fitness class to line readings from the core cast."

Tony Sokol of Den of Geek gave the episode a 4 star rating out of 5 and wrote, "Vampire wannabes beware, What We Do in the Shadows proves the concept of 'faking it til you make it' can take a hideous toll. There is no ascension for the bloodless. Written by Stefani Robinson, and directed by Yana Gorskaya, 'The Wellness Center' is a cautionary tale for all, and ends on a delightfully suspenseful cliffhanger."

Melody McCune of Telltale TV gave the episode a 4.5 star rating out of 5 and wrote, "'The Wellness Center' is another fun, innovative addition to What We Do in the Shadows' already illustrious catalog. The episode features standout performances from Kayvan Novak and Harvey Guillén, and it gives us more character growth, more clever one-liners, and all the Farrah Fawcett hair." Alejandra Bodden of Bleeding Cool gave the episode a 9.5 out of 10 rating and wrote, "Yet another excellent episode of FX's What We Do in the Shadows hits the shelves with 'The Wellness Center'. Another look into a thread we have been seeing this season: loneliness. This time though, it explores the subject of vampirism as a curse. Well, this episode showcases mental health in a different way: it shows what happens when a vampire deals with a depressive crisis and wishes to turn back into a human."

=== Accolades ===
For the episode, Stefani Robinson was nominated for Outstanding Writing for a Comedy Series at the 74th Primetime Emmy Awards. She lost the award to Abbott Elementary for the episode "Pilot".
