= Walk this way (humor) =

Recurrent pun in a number of comedy films and television shows

"Walk this way" is a recurrent pun in a number of comedy films and television shows. It may be derived from an old vaudeville joke that refers to the double usage of the word "way" in English as both a direction and a manner.

One version of this old joke goes like this: A heavy-set woman goes into a drug store and asks for talcum powder. The bowlegged clerk says, "Walk this way," and the woman answers, "If I could walk that way, I wouldn't need talcum powder!" In the 1970's Monty Python's Flying Circus episode "The Buzz Aldrin Show" [S02E04] a man enters a pharmacy asking for aftershave. When the chemist replies: "Certainly, sir, walk this way please," the man replies "If I could walk that way I wouldn't need aftershave."

As a popular visual gag, the joke perhaps first appeared on film in "Is My Palm Read" (1933), a Fleischer cartoon short in which Betty Boop complies with the instruction of Bimbo playing the palm reader. It is used in After the Thin Man (1936), with William Powell imitating the butler. Multiple generations were introduced to the gag by The Three Stooges, who used "Walk This Way" at least once but memorably in their 1951 film Don't Throw the Knife. Playing census takers, Moe, Larry and Shemp follow a woman into her apartment and imitate her sexy walk. Mel Brooks included the routine in four major films, The Producers, Young Frankenstein, History of the World, Part I, and Robin Hood: Men in Tights. According to Gene Wilder, who co-wrote the script of Young Frankenstein and played the title character, Brooks added the joke while shooting the scene, inspired by the old "talcum powder" routine. Marty Feldman, who played the hunchback Igor in Young Frankenstein, later said:

It's a terribly old music hall joke. I did that to make the crew laugh and Mel Brooks said, "Let's shoot it" ... [Gene Wilder and I] both said, "Mel, please take that out", and he left it in. He said, "I think it's funny". Audiences laugh at it. Gene and I were both wrong. Mel was right.

The Aerosmith song "Walk This Way" was inspired by the gag, although there are at least two stories of exactly which version inspired the band. In a 1984 interview, Steven Tyler credits the Three Stooges skit as being the impetus of the song. (Joe Perry has written that Aerosmith band members were devoted to watching The Three Stooges in the band's early days.) Another version cites the band's viewing of the film Young Frankenstein as inspiration.
