= 70th Primetime Emmy Awards =

2018 American television programming awards

- Promotional poster
- Date: September 17, 2018 (Ceremony); September 8–9, 2018 (Creative Arts Awards)
- Location: Microsoft Theater, Los Angeles, California
- Presented by: Academy of Television Arts & Sciences
- Hosted by: Michael Che; Colin Jost

Highlights
- Most awards: Major: The Marvelous Mrs. Maisel (5); All: Game of Thrones (9)
- Most nominations: The Assassination of Gianni Versace: American Crime Story (9)
- Outstanding Comedy Series: The Marvelous Mrs. Maisel
- Outstanding Drama Series: Game of Thrones
- Outstanding Limited Series: The Assassination of Gianni Versace: American Crime Story
- Website: http://www.emmys.com/

Television/radio coverage
- Network: NBC
- Viewership: 10.2 million
- Produced by: Done and Dusted; Universal Television; Broadway Video
- Directed by: Hamish Hamilton

The 70th Primetime Emmy Awards honored the best in American prime time television programming from June 1, 2017, until May 31, 2018, as chosen by the Academy of Television Arts & Sciences. The ceremony was held live on September 17, 2018, at the Microsoft Theater in Downtown Los Angeles, California, where 26 awards were presented, and was broadcast in the U.S. by NBC. The ceremony was hosted by Michael Che and Colin Jost.

The nominations were announced by Ryan Eggold and Samira Wiley on July 12, 2018. The biggest winner of the night was Amazon Prime Video's comedy-drama The Marvelous Mrs. Maisel, which won five trophies, including the honor for Outstanding Comedy Series, making history by becoming the first streaming television series to claim the prize. Game of Thrones also won its third trophy for Outstanding Drama Series, and Peter Dinklage tied for the most wins for Outstanding Supporting Actor in a Drama Series, with his third victory for Game of Thrones. He would get the sole record by winning for the eighth and final season the following year.

With a U.S. viewership of 10.2 million that reflects an 11% drop from the previous year, it was the then-least watched show in Emmy history. It was also the first time in the show's history that Modern Family was not nominated for Outstanding Comedy Series after eight successive nominations and a record five wins from 2010 to 2014.

The three wins of John Legend, Andrew Lloyd Webber, and Tim Rice made them the thirteenth, fourteenth, and fifteenth persons to become an EGOT (at the creative arts ceremony).

== Winners and nominees ==
Winners are listed first, highlighted in boldface, and indicated with a double dagger (‡). (Note: The outlets listed for each program are the U.S. broadcasters or streaming services identified in the nominations, which for some international productions are different from the broadcaster(s) that originally commissioned the program.) For simplicity, producers who received nominations for program awards have been omitted.

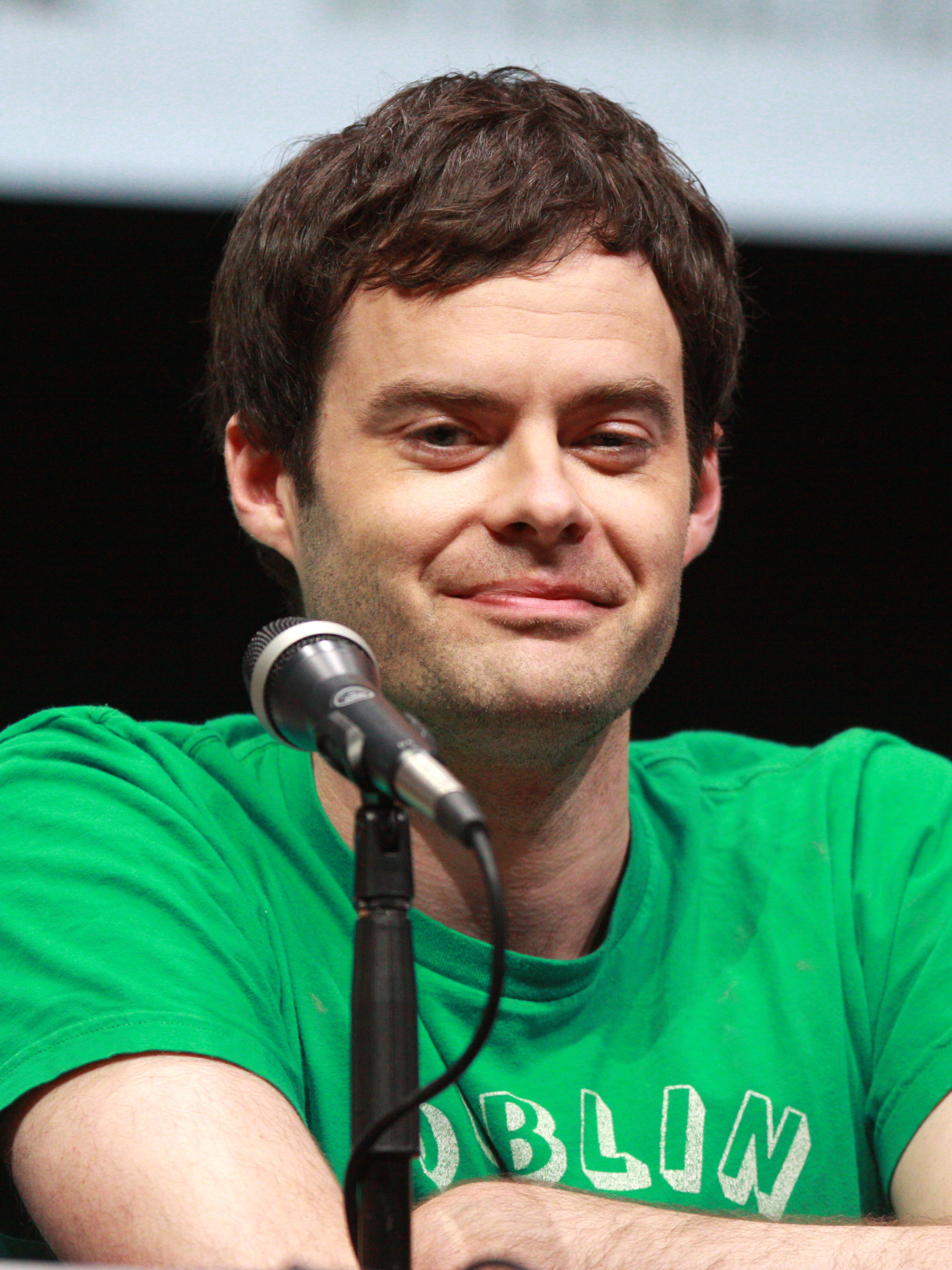
Bill Hader, Outstanding Lead Actor in a Comedy Series winner

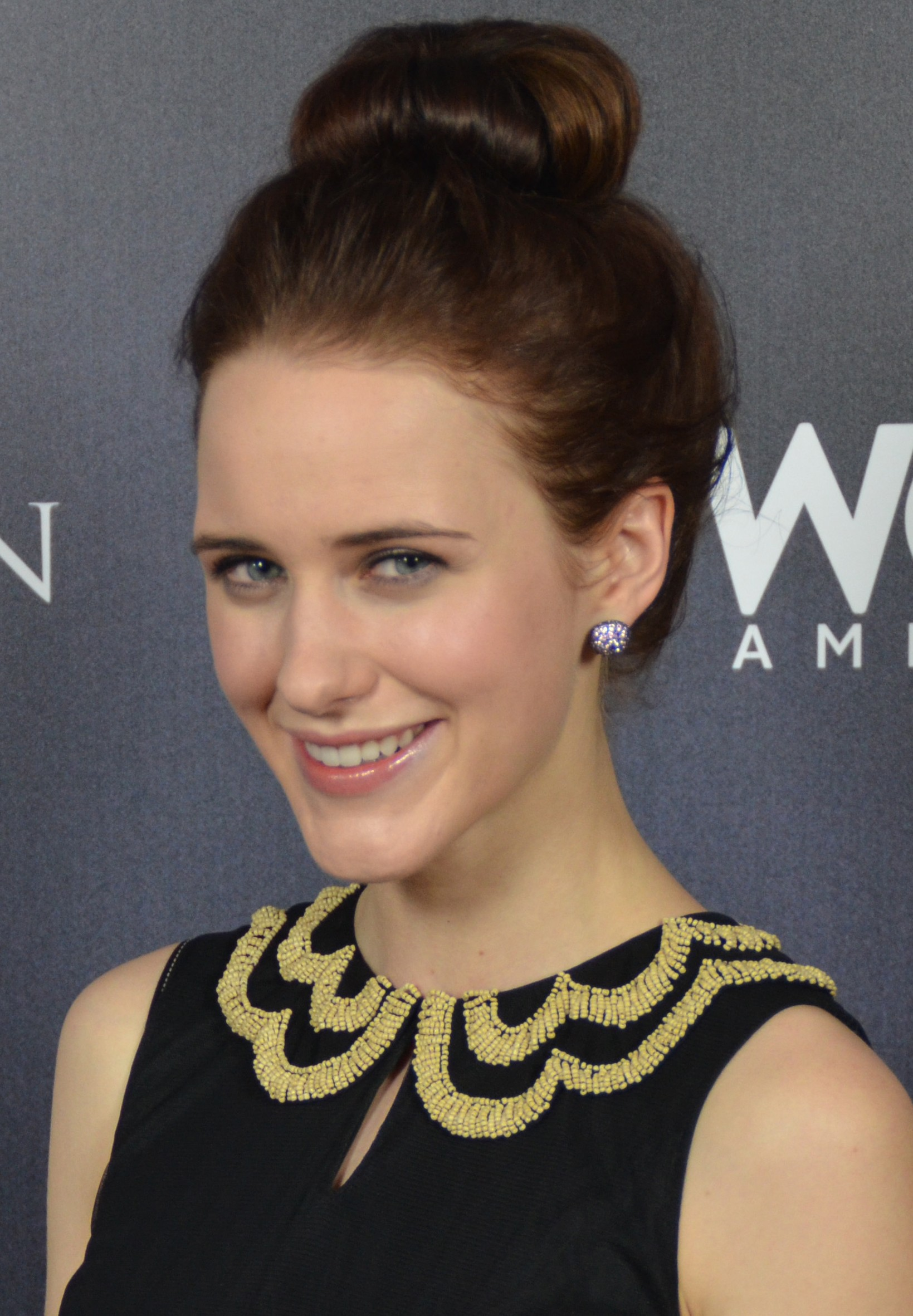
Rachel Brosnahan, Outstanding Lead Actress in a Comedy Series winner

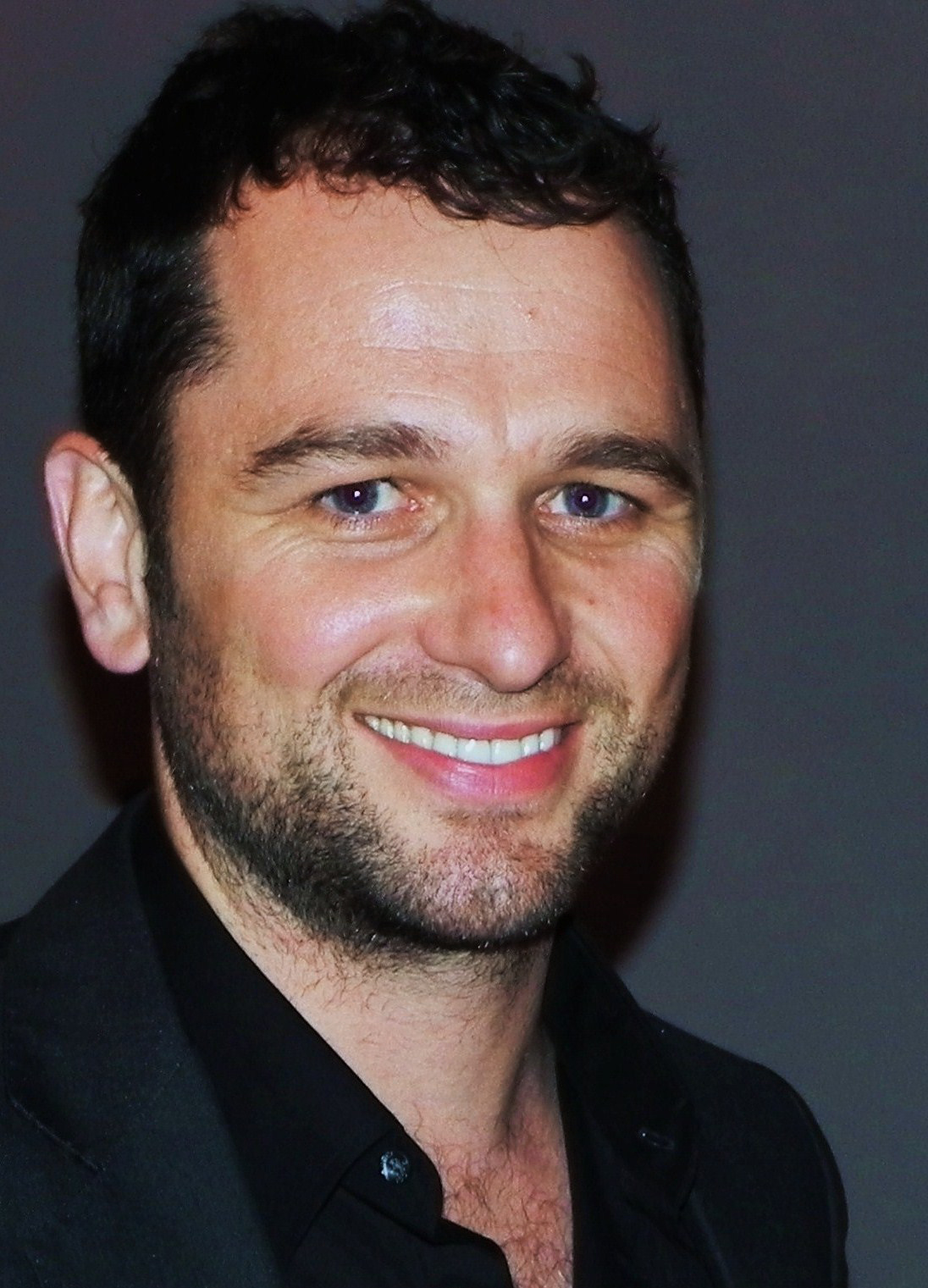
Matthew Rhys, Outstanding Lead Actor in a Drama Series winner

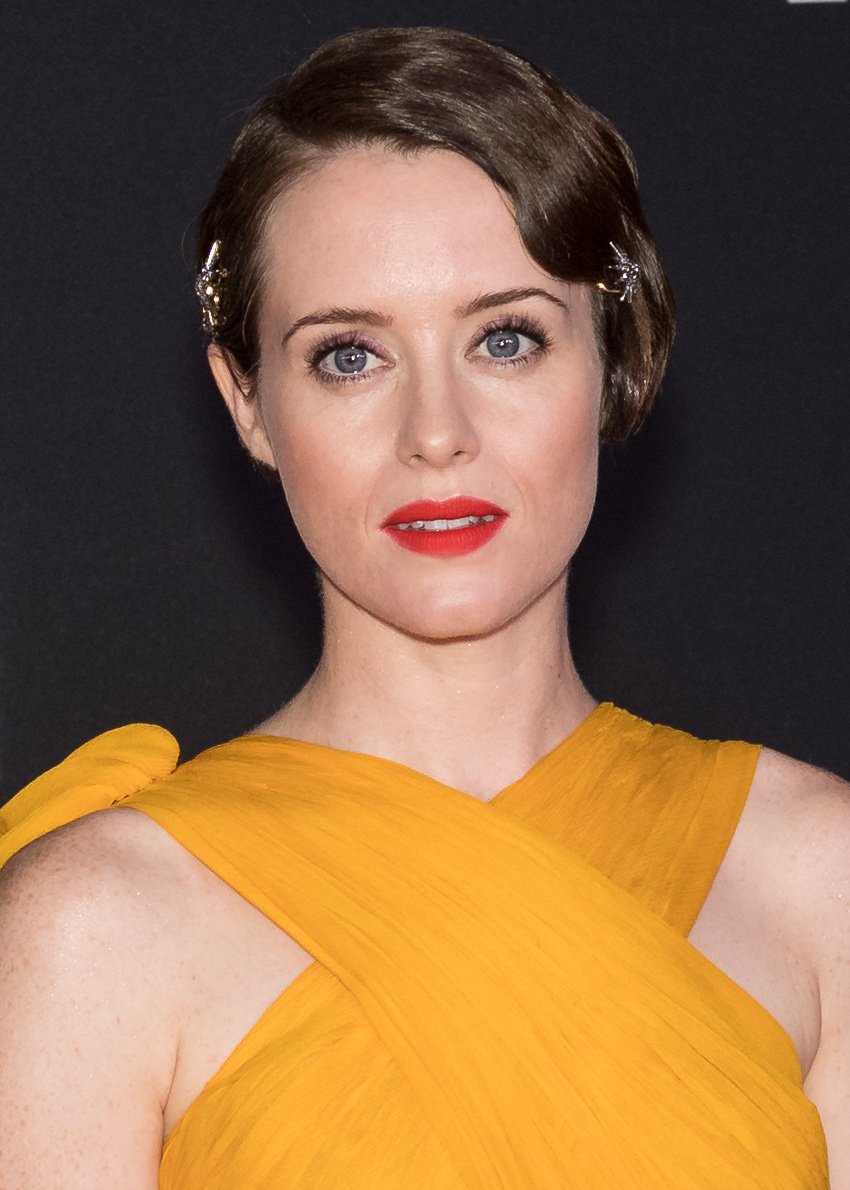
Claire Foy, Outstanding Lead Actress in a Drama Series winner

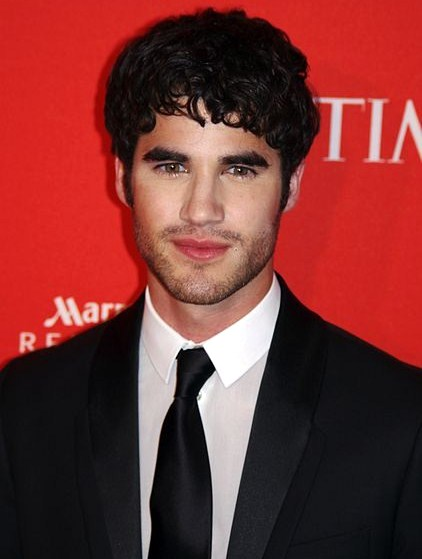
Darren Criss, Outstanding Lead Actor in a Limited Series or Movie winner

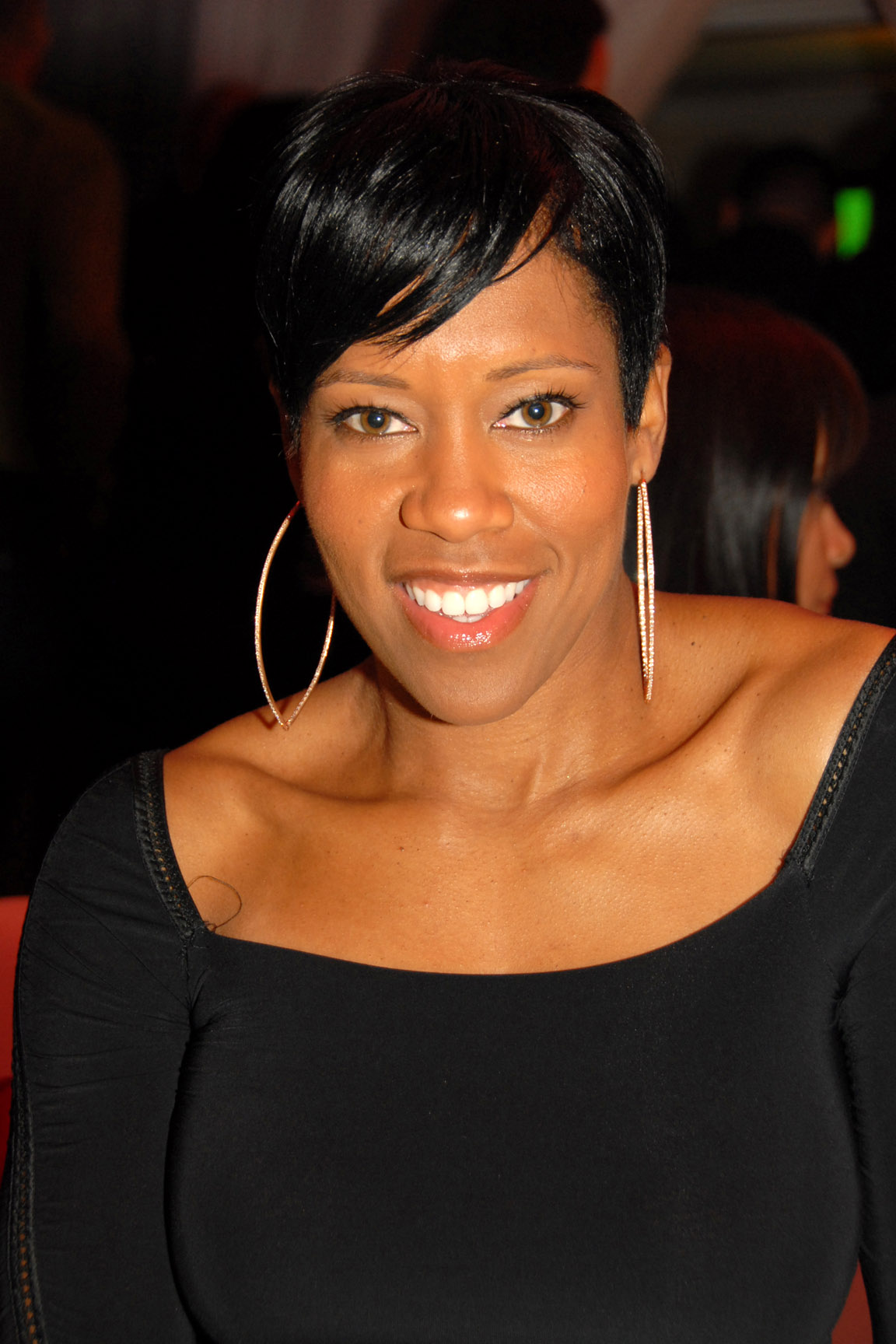
Regina King, Outstanding Lead Actress in a Limited Series or Movie winner

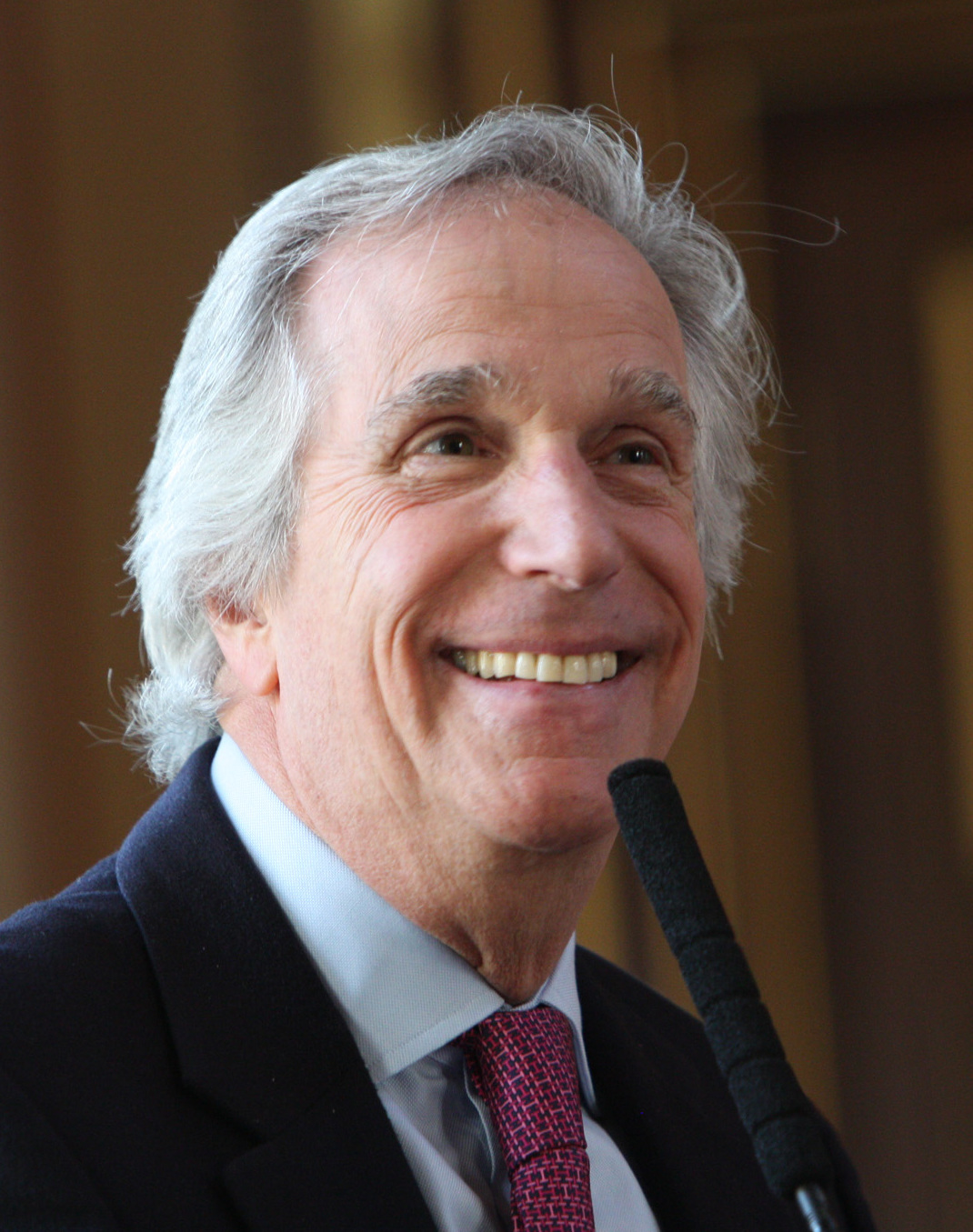
Henry Winkler, Outstanding Supporting Actor in a Comedy Series winner

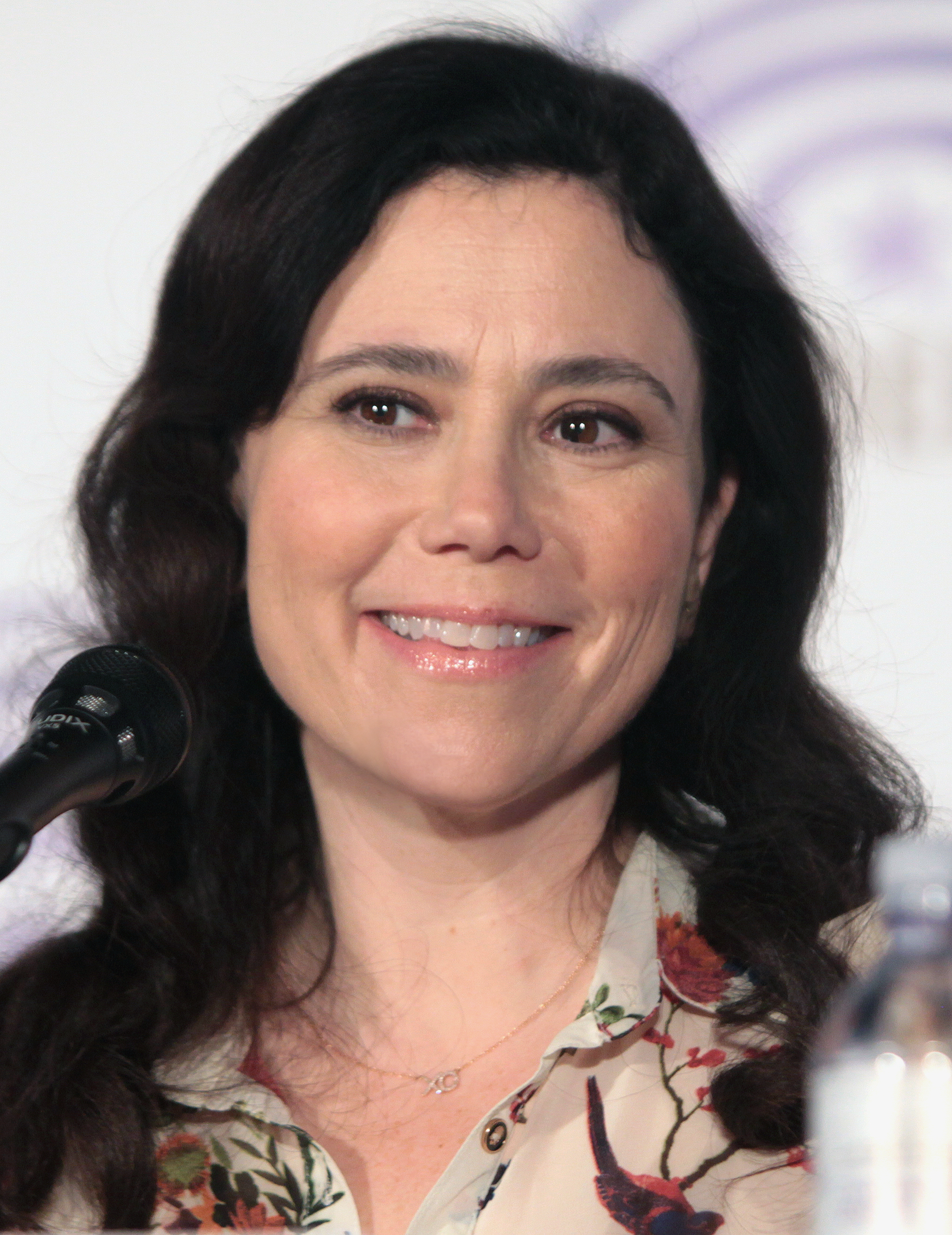
Alex Borstein, Outstanding Supporting Actress in a Comedy Series winner

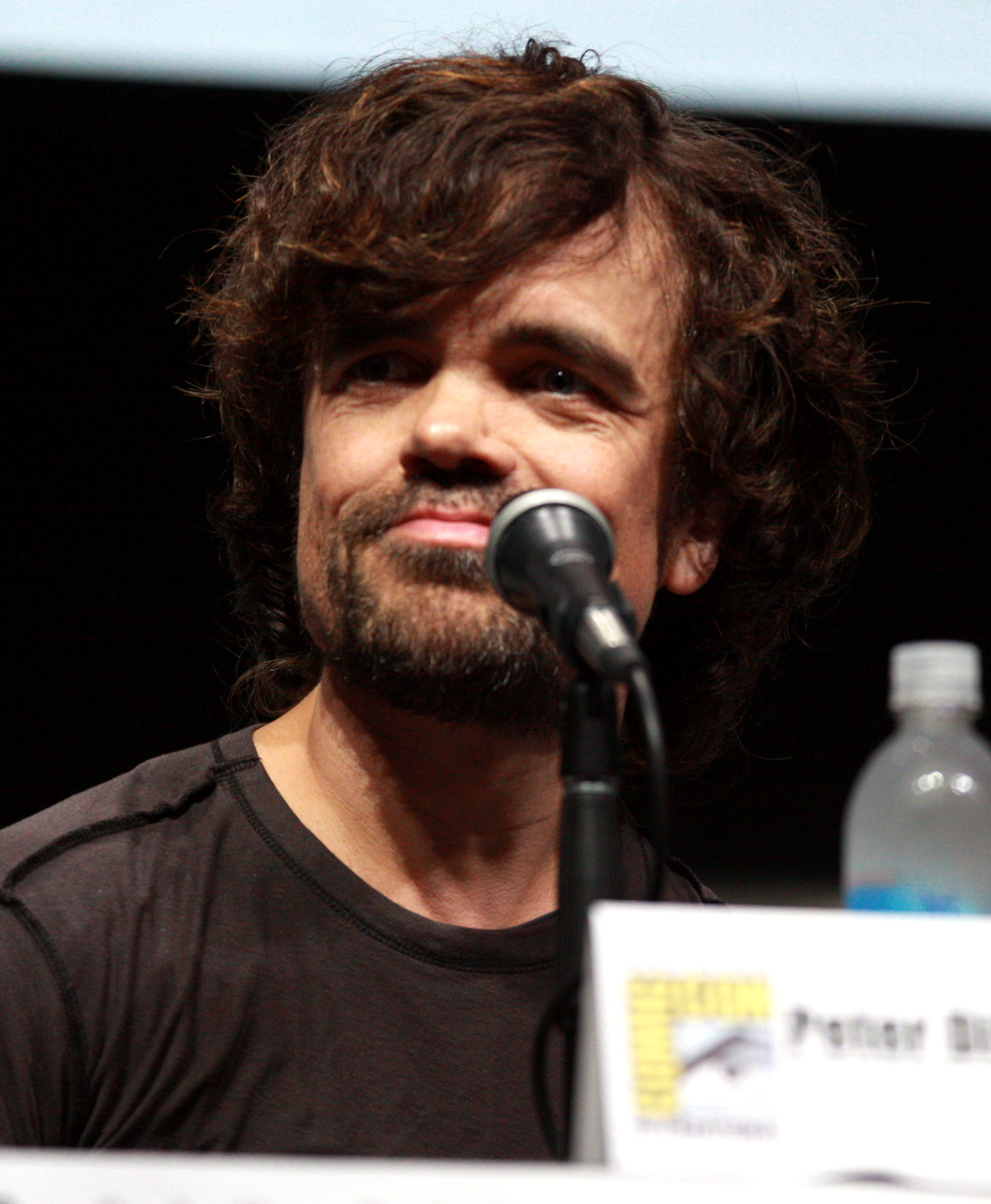
Peter Dinklage, Outstanding Supporting Actor in a Drama Series winner

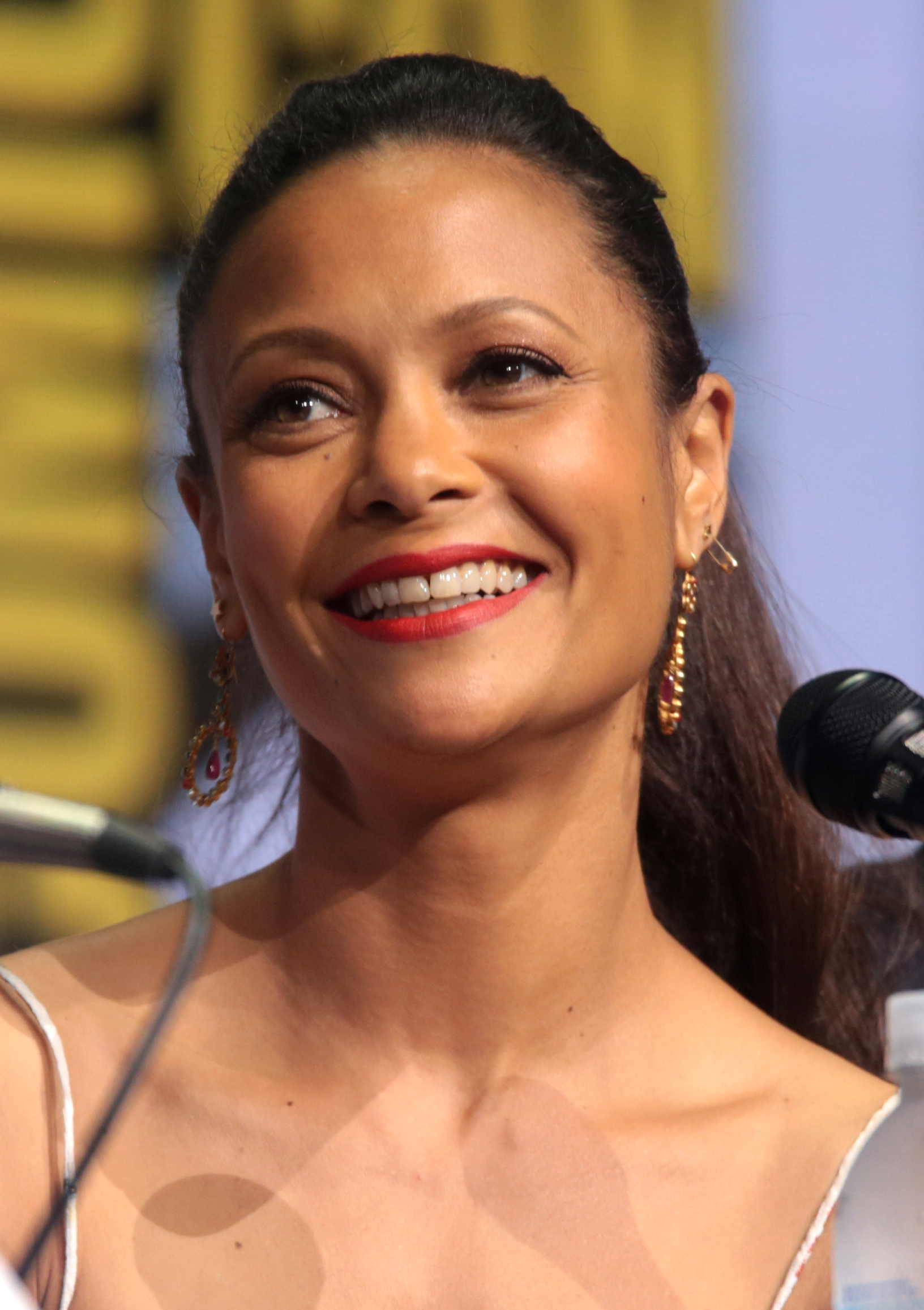
Thandie Newton, Outstanding Supporting Actress in a Drama Series winner

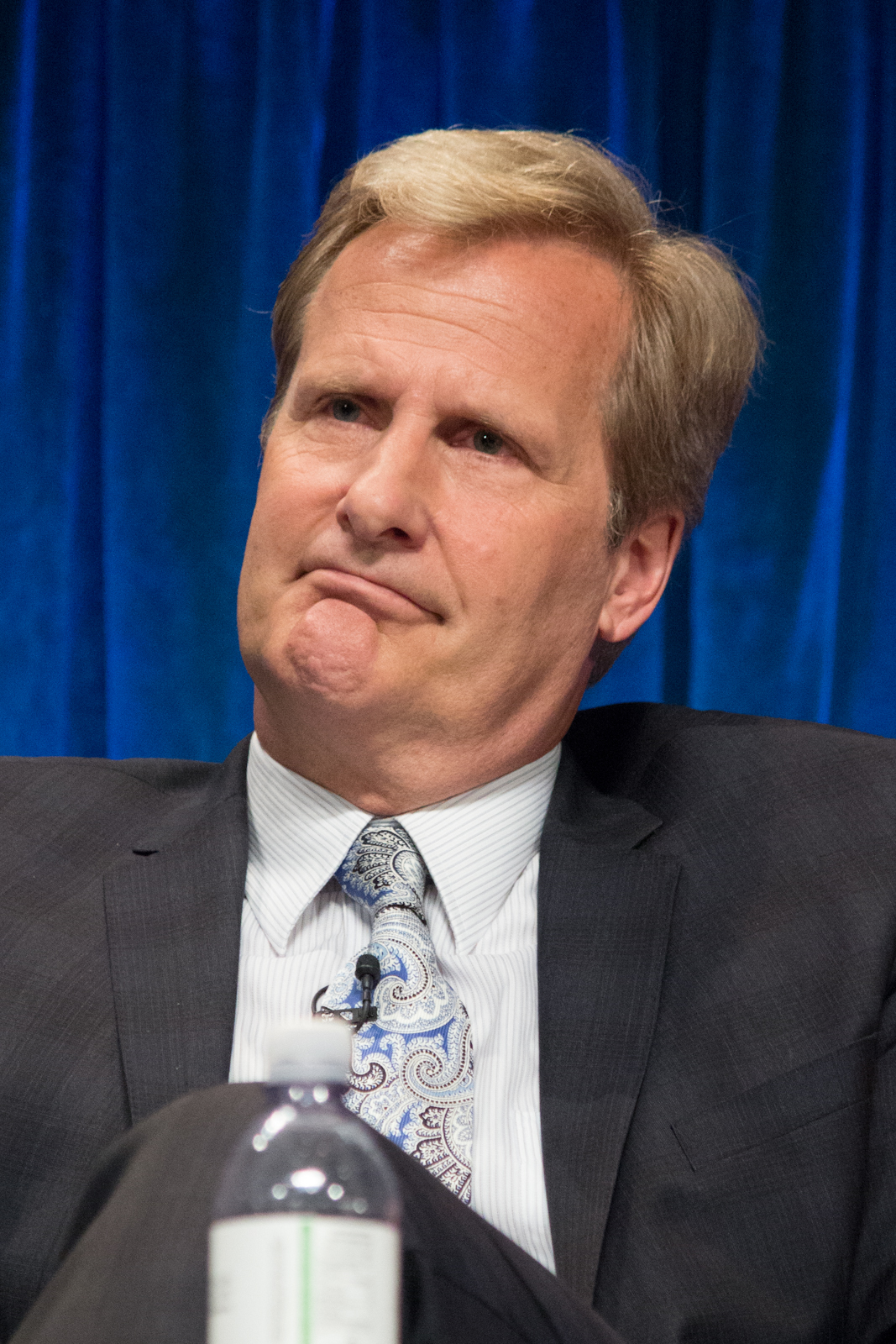
Jeff Daniels, Outstanding Supporting Actor in a Limited Series or Movie winner

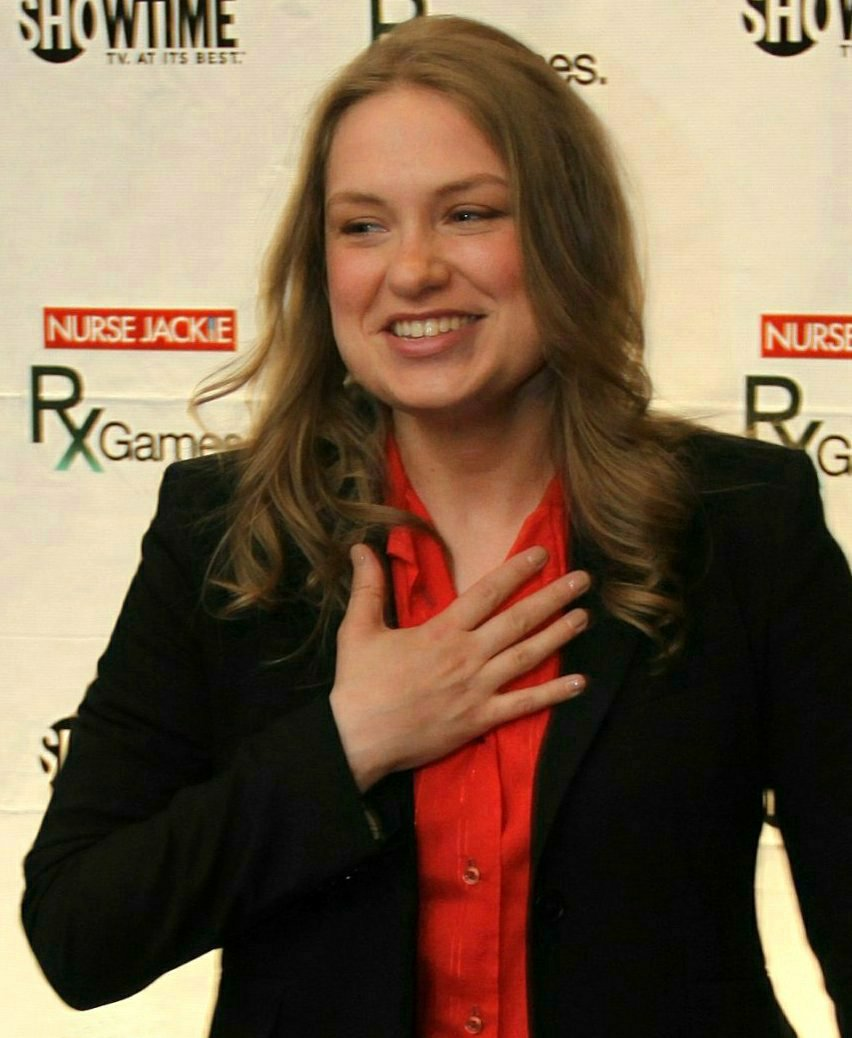
Merritt Wever, Outstanding Supporting Actress in a Limited Series or Movie winner

=== Programs ===
Programs
**Outstanding Comedy Series**: **The Marvelous Mrs. Maisel (Prime Video)**‡; Atlanta (FX); Barry (HBO); Black-ish (ABC); Curb Your Enthusiasm (HBO); GLOW (Netflix); Silicon Valley (HBO); Unbreakable Kimmy Schmidt (Netflix)	**Outstanding Drama Series**: **Game of Thrones (HBO)**‡; The Americans (FX); The Crown (Netflix); The Handmaid's Tale (Hulu); Stranger Things (Netflix); This Is Us (NBC); Westworld (HBO)
**Outstanding Variety Talk Series**: **Last Week Tonight with John Oliver (HBO)**‡; The Daily Show with Trevor Noah (Comedy Central); Full Frontal with Samantha Bee (TBS); Jimmy Kimmel Live! (ABC); The Late Late Show with James Corden (CBS); The Late Show with Stephen Colbert (CBS)	**Outstanding Variety Sketch Series**: **Saturday Night Live (NBC)**‡; At Home with Amy Sedaris (truTV); Drunk History (Comedy Central); I Love You, America with Sarah Silverman (Hulu); Portlandia (IFC); Tracey Ullman's Show (HBO)
**Outstanding Limited Series**: **The Assassination of Gianni Versace: American Crime Story (FX)**‡; The Alienist (TNT); Genius: Picasso (Nat Geo); Godless (Netflix); Patrick Melrose (Showtime)	**Outstanding Reality-Competition Program**: **RuPaul's Drag Race (VH1)**‡; The Amazing Race (CBS); American Ninja Warrior (NBC); Project Runway (Lifetime); Top Chef (Bravo); The Voice (NBC)

=== Acting ===
==== Lead performances ====
Lead performances
**Outstanding Lead Actor in a Comedy Series**: **Bill Hader – Barry as Barry Berkman / Barry Block (HBO) (Episode: "Chapter Seven: Loud, Fast, and Keep Going")** ‡; Anthony Anderson – Black-ish as Andre "Dre" Johnson Sr. (Episode: "Advance to Go (Collect $200)" (ABC); Ted Danson – The Good Place as Michael (Episode: "Dance Dance Resolution") (NBC); Larry David – Curb Your Enthusiasm as Larry David (Episode: "Fatwa!") (HBO); Donald Glover – Atlanta as Earnest "Earn" Marks / Teddy Perkins (Episode: "Teddy Perkins") (FX); William H. Macy – Shameless as Frank Gallagher (Episode: "Sleepwalking") (Showtime)	**Outstanding Lead Actress in a Comedy Series**: **Rachel Brosnahan – The Marvelous Mrs. Maisel as Miriam "Midge" Maisel (Episode: "Thank You and Good Night") (Prime Video)**‡; Pamela Adlon – Better Things as Sam Fox (Episode: "Eulogy") (FX); Allison Janney – Mom as Bonnie Plunkett (Episode: "Phone Confetti and a Wee Dingle") (CBS); Issa Rae – Insecure as Issa Dee (Episode: "Hella Great") (HBO); Tracee Ellis Ross – Black-ish as Dr. Rainbow "Bow" Johnson (Episode: "Elder. Scam.") (ABC); Lily Tomlin – Grace and Frankie as Frankie Bergstein (Episode: "The Home") (Netflix)
**Outstanding Lead Actor in a Drama Series**: **Matthew Rhys – The Americans as Philip Jennings (Episode: "START") (FX)**‡; Jason Bateman – Ozark as Martin "Marty" Byrde (Episode: "The Toll") (Netflix); Sterling K. Brown – This Is Us as Randall Pearson (Episode: "Number Three") (NBC); Ed Harris – Westworld as the Man in Black / William (Episode: "Vanishing Point") (HBO); Milo Ventimiglia – This Is Us as Jack Pearson (Episode: "The Car") (NBC); Jeffrey Wright – Westworld as Bernard Lowe (Episode: "The Passenger") (HBO)	**Outstanding Lead Actress in a Drama Series**: **Claire Foy – The Crown as Queen Elizabeth II (Episode: "Dear Mrs. Kennedy") (Netflix)**‡; Tatiana Maslany – Orphan Black as various characters (Episode: "To Right the Wrongs of Many") (BBC America); Elisabeth Moss – The Handmaid's Tale as June Osborne / Offred (Episode: "The Last Ceremony") (Hulu); Sandra Oh – Killing Eve as Eve Polastri (Episode: "I Have a Thing About Bathrooms") (BBC America); Keri Russell – The Americans as Elizabeth Jennings (Episode: "The Summit") (FX); Evan Rachel Wood – Westworld as Dolores Abernathy (Episode: "Reunion") (HBO)
**Outstanding Lead Actor in a Limited Series or Movie**: **Darren Criss – The Assassination of Gianni Versace: American Crime Story as Andrew Cunanan (FX)**‡; Antonio Banderas – Genius: Picasso as Pablo Picasso (Nat Geo); Benedict Cumberbatch – Patrick Melrose as Patrick Melrose (Showtime); Jeff Daniels – on The Looming Tower as John P. O'Neill (Hulu); John Legend – Jesus Christ Superstar Live in Concert as Jesus Christ (NBC); Jesse Plemons – USS Callister (Black Mirror) as Captain Robert Daly (Netflix)	**Outstanding Lead Actress in a Limited Series or Movie**: **Regina King – Seven Seconds as Latrice Butler (Netflix)**‡; Jessica Biel – The Sinner as Cora Tannetti (USA); Laura Dern – The Tale as Jennifer Fox (HBO); Michelle Dockery – Godless as Alice Fletcher (Netflix); Edie Falco – Law & Order True Crime: The Menendez Murders as Leslie Abramson (NBC); Sarah Paulson – American Horror Story: Cult as Ally Mayfair-Richards (FX)

==== Supporting performances ====
Supporting performances
**Outstanding Supporting Actor in a Comedy Series**: **Henry Winkler – Barry as Gene Cousineau (Episode: "Chapter Four: Commit... to YOU") (HBO)**‡; Louie Anderson – Baskets as Christine Baskets (Episode: "Thanksgiving") (FX); Alec Baldwin – Saturday Night Live as Donald Trump (Episode: "Host: Donald Glover") (NBC); Tituss Burgess – Unbreakable Kimmy Schmidt as Titus Andromedon (Episode: "Kimmy and the Beest!") (Netflix); Brian Tyree Henry – Atlanta as Alfred "Paper Boi" Miles (Episode: "Woods") (FX); Tony Shalhoub – The Marvelous Mrs. Maisel as Abraham "Abe" Weissman (Episode: "Thank You and Good Night") (Prime Video); Kenan Thompson – Saturday Night Live as various characters (Episode: "Host: John Mulaney") (NBC)	**Outstanding Supporting Actress in a Comedy Series**: **Alex Borstein – The Marvelous Mrs. Maisel as Susie Myerson (Episode: "Doink") (Prime Video)**‡; Zazie Beetz – Atlanta as Vanessa "Van" Keefer (Episode: "Helen") (FX); Aidy Bryant – Saturday Night Live as various characters (Episode: "Host: Chadwick Boseman") (NBC); Betty Gilpin – GLOW as Debbie "Liberty Belle" Eagan (Episode: "Debbie Does Something") (Netflix); Leslie Jones – Saturday Night Live as various characters (Episode: "Host: Donald Glover") (NBC); Kate McKinnon – Saturday Night Live as various characters (Episode: "Host: Bill Hader") (NBC); Laurie Metcalf – Roseanne as Jackie Harris (Episode: "No Country for Old Women") (ABC); Megan Mullally – Will & Grace as Karen Walker (Episode: "Rosario's Quinceanera") (NBC)
**Outstanding Supporting Actor in a Drama Series**: **Peter Dinklage – Game of Thrones as Tyrion Lannister (Episode: "The Dragon and the Wolf") (HBO)**‡; Nikolaj Coster-Waldau – Game of Thrones as Jaime Lannister (Episode: (HBO); Joseph Fiennes – The Handmaid's Tale as Commander Fred Waterford (Episode:"First Blood") (Hulu); David Harbour – Stranger Things as Jim Hopper (Episode: "Chapter Four: Will the Wise") (Netflix); Mandy Patinkin – Homeland as Saul Berenson (Episode: "Species Jump") (Showtime); Matt Smith – The Crown as Prince Philip, Duke of Edinburgh (Episode: "Mystery Man") (Netflix)	**Outstanding Supporting Actress in a Drama Series**: **Thandiwe Newton – Westworld as Maeve Millay (Episode: "Akane no Mai") (HBO)**‡; Alexis Bledel – The Handmaid's Tale as Emily / Ofsteven (Episode: "Unwomen") (Hulu); Millie Bobby Brown – Stranger Things as Jane "Eleven" Ives (Episode: "Chapter Three: The Pollywog") (Netflix); Ann Dowd – The Handmaid's Tale as Aunt Lydia (Episode: "June") (Hulu); Lena Headey – Game of Thrones as Cersei Lannister (Episode: "The Dragon and the Wolf") (HBO); Vanessa Kirby – The Crown as Princess Margaret (Episode: "Beryl") (Netflix); Yvonne Strahovski – The Handmaid's Tale as Serena Joy Waterford (Episode: "Women's Work") (Hulu)
**Outstanding Supporting Actor in a Limited Series or Movie**: **Jeff Daniels – Godless as Frank Griffin (Netflix)**‡; Brandon Victor Dixon – Jesus Christ Superstar Live in Concert as Judas Iscariot (NBC); John Leguizamo – Waco as Jacob Vazquez (Paramount Network); Ricky Martin – The Assassination of Gianni Versace: American Crime Story as Antonio D'Amico (FX); Édgar Ramírez – The Assassination of Gianni Versace: American Crime Story as Gianni Versace (FX); Michael Stuhlbarg – The Looming Tower as Richard Clarke (Hulu); Finn Wittrock – The Assassination of Gianni Versace: American Crime Story as Jeffrey Trail (FX)	**Outstanding Supporting Actress in a Limited Series or Movie**: **Merritt Wever – Godless as Mary Agnes McNue (Netflix)**‡; Sara Bareilles – Jesus Christ Superstar Live in Concert as Mary Magdalene (NBC); Penélope Cruz – The Assassination of Gianni Versace: American Crime Story as Donatella Versace (FX); Judith Light – The Assassination of Gianni Versace: American Crime Story as Marilyn Miglin (FX); Adina Porter – American Horror Story: Cult as Beverly Hope (FX); Letitia Wright – Black Museum (Black Mirror) as Nish (Netflix)

=== Directing ===
Directing
**Outstanding Directing for a Comedy Series**: **The Marvelous Mrs. Maisel: "Pilot" – Amy Sherman-Palladino (Prime Video)**‡; Atlanta: "FUBU" – Donald Glover (FX); Atlanta: "Teddy Perkins" – Hiro Murai (FX); Barry: "Chapter One: Make Your Mark" – Bill Hader (HBO); The Big Bang Theory: "The Bow Tie Asymmetry" – Mark Cendrowski (CBS); GLOW: "Pilot" – Jesse Peretz (Netflix); Silicon Valley: "Initial Coin Offering" – Mike Judge (HBO)	**Outstanding Directing for a Drama Series**: **The Crown: "Paterfamilias" – Stephen Daldry (Netflix)**‡; Game of Thrones: "Beyond the Wall" – Alan Taylor (HBO); Game of Thrones: "The Dragon and the Wolf" – Jeremy Podeswa (HBO); The Handmaid's Tale: "After" – Kari Skogland (Hulu); Ozark: "The Toll" – Jason Bateman (Netflix); Ozark: "Tonight We Improvise" – Daniel Sackheim (Netflix); Stranger Things: "Chapter Nine: The Gate" – The Duffer Brothers (Netflix)
**Outstanding Directing for a Variety Special**: **The Oscars – Glenn Weiss (ABC)**‡; Dave Chappelle: Equanimity – Stan Lathan (Netflix); Jerry Seinfeld: Jerry Before Seinfeld – Michael Bonfiglio (Netflix); Steve Martin and Martin Short: An Evening You Will Forget for the Rest of Your Life – Marcus Raboy (Netflix); Super Bowl LII Halftime Show Starring Justin Timberlake – Hamish Hamilton (NBC)	**Outstanding Directing for a Limited Series, Movie or Dramatic Special**: **The Assassination of Gianni Versace: American Crime Story: "The Man Who Would Be Vogue" – Ryan Murphy (FX)**‡; Godless – Scott Frank (Netflix); Jesus Christ Superstar Live in Concert – David Leveaux and Alex Rudzinski (NBC); The Looming Tower: "9/11" – Craig Zisk (Hulu); Paterno – Barry Levinson (HBO); Patrick Melrose – Edward Berger (Showtime); Twin Peaks – David Lynch (Showtime)

=== Writing ===
Writing
**Outstanding Writing for a Comedy Series**: **The Marvelous Mrs. Maisel: "Pilot" – Amy Sherman-Palladino (Prime Video)**‡; Atlanta: "Alligator Man" – Donald Glover (FX); Atlanta: "Barbershop" – Stefani Robinson (FX); Barry: "Chapter One: Make Your Mark" – Alec Berg and Bill Hader (HBO); Barry: "Chapter Seven: Loud, Fast, and Keep Going" – Liz Sarnoff (HBO); Silicon Valley: "Fifty-One Percent" – Alec Berg (HBO)	**Outstanding Writing for a Drama Series**: **The Americans: "START" – Joel Fields and Joe Weisberg (FX)**‡; The Crown: "Mystery Man" – Peter Morgan (Netflix); Game of Thrones: "The Dragon and the Wolf" – David Benioff and D. B. Weiss (HBO); The Handmaid's Tale: "June" – Bruce Miller (Hulu); Killing Eve: "Nice Face" – Phoebe Waller-Bridge (BBC America); Stranger Things: "Chapter Nine: The Gate" – The Duffer Brothers (Netflix)
**Outstanding Writing for a Variety Special**: **John Mulaney: Kid Gorgeous at Radio City – John Mulaney (Netflix)**‡; Full Frontal with Samantha Bee Presents: The Great American* Puerto Rico (*it's complicated) – Samantha Bee, Pat Cassels, Mike Drucker, Eric Drysdale, Mathan Erhardt, Miles Kahn and Nicole Silverberg (TBS); Michelle Wolf: Nice Lady – Michelle Wolf (HBO); Patton Oswalt: Annihilation – Patton Oswalt (Netflix); Steve Martin and Martin Short: An Evening You Will Forget for the Rest of Your Life – Steve Martin and Martin Short (Netflix)	**Outstanding Writing for a Limited Series, Movie or Dramatic Special**: **USS Callister (Black Mirror) – William Bridges and Charlie Brooker (Netflix)**‡; American Vandal: "Clean Up" – Kevin McManus and Matthew McManus (Netflix); The Assassination of Gianni Versace: American Crime Story: "House by the Lake" – Tom Rob Smith (FX); Godless – Scott Frank (Netflix); Patrick Melrose – David Nicholls (Showtime); Twin Peaks – Mark Frost and David Lynch (Showtime)

== Presenters and performers ==
The awards were presented by the following:

=== Presenters ===
Name(s)	Role
Claire Foy; Matt Smith	Presenters of the award for Outstanding Supporting Actor in a Comedy Series
Jimmy Kimmel; Tracy Morgan	Presenters of the award for Outstanding Supporting Actress in a Comedy Series
Millie Bobby Brown; Emilia Clarke	Presenters of the award for Outstanding Writing for a Comedy Series
Sandra Oh; Andy Samberg	Presenters of the award for Outstanding Directing for a Comedy Series
Angela Bassett; Tiffany Haddish	Presenters of the award for Outstanding Lead Actress in a Comedy Series
Michael Douglas	Presenter of the award for Outstanding Lead Actor in a Comedy Series
John Legend; Chrissy Teigen	Presenters of the award for Outstanding Supporting Actress in a Limited Series or Movie
Kit Harington; Constance Wu	Presenters of the award for Outstanding Supporting Actor in a Limited Series or Movie
Aidy Bryant; Bob Odenkirk	Presenters of the award for Outstanding Writing for a Limited Series, Movie or Dramatic Special
Alec Baldwin; Kate McKinnon	Introducers of a special statement from Betty White
James Corden	Presenter of the award for Outstanding Directing for a Limited Series, Movie or Dramatic Special
Leslie Jones; RuPaul	Presenters of the award for Outstanding Lead Actress in a Limited Series or Movie
Rachel Brosnahan; Larry David	Presenters of the award for Outstanding Lead Actor in a Limited Series or Movie
Ilana Glazer; Abbi Jacobson	Presenters of the award for Outstanding Writing for a Variety Special
Sterling K. Brown; Ron Cephas Jones	Presenters of the award for Outstanding Directing for a Variety Special
Tina Fey	Presenter of the In Memoriam tribute
Samantha Bee; Taraji P. Henson	Presenters of the award for Outstanding Supporting Actor in a Drama Series
Elisabeth Moss; Samira Wiley	Presenters of the award for Outstanding Supporting Actress in a Drama Series
Lil Rel Howery; Gina Rodriguez	Presenters of the award for Outstanding Writing for a Drama Series
Hannah Gadsby	Presenter of the award for Outstanding Directing for a Drama Series
Bobby Berk; Karamo Brown; Tan France; Antoni Porowski; Jonathan Van Ness	Presenters of the award for Outstanding Lead Actor in a Drama Series
Sarah Paulson	Presenter of the award for Outstanding Lead Actress in a Drama Series
Hayma Washington	Presenter of a special presentation highlighting Emmy history
Rick and Morty (Voiced by Justin Roiland)	Presenters of the award for Outstanding Reality-Competition Program
Neal Brennan; Dave Chappelle	Presenters of the award for Outstanding Variety Sketch Series
Eric Bana; Connie Britton	Presenters of the award for Outstanding Variety Talk Series
Patricia Arquette; Benicio del Toro; Ben Stiller	Presenters of the award for Outstanding Limited Series
Will Ferrell	Presenter of the award for Outstanding Comedy Series
Kenan Thompson	Presenter of the award for Outstanding Drama Series

=== Performers ===
Name(s)	Performed
Kate McKinnon; Kenan Thompson; Tituss Burgess; Kristen Bell; Sterling K. Brown; Ricky Martin; Andy Samberg; RuPaul; John Legend	"We Solved It!"
Aretha Franklin	"Amazing Grace"

== Most major nominations ==
Programs that received multiple major (Note: "Major" constitutes the categories listed above: Program, Acting, Directing, and Writing. This grouping does not include the technical categories.) nominations are listed below, by number of nominations per work and per network:

Shows that received multiple nominations
Nominations	Show	Category	Network
9	The Assassination of Gianni Versace: American Crime Story	Limited	FX
8	Atlanta	Comedy	FX
8	The Handmaid's Tale	Drama	Hulu
7	Game of Thrones	Drama	HBO
6	Barry	Comedy	HBO
6	The Crown	Drama	Netflix
6	Godless	Limited	Netflix
6	The Marvelous Mrs. Maisel	Comedy	Prime Video
6	Saturday Night Live	Comedy/Variety	NBC
5	Stranger Things	Drama	Netflix
5	Westworld	Drama	HBO
4	The Americans	Drama	FX
4	Jesus Christ Superstar Live in Concert	Movie	NBC
4	Patrick Melrose	Limited	Showtime
3	Black-ish	Comedy	ABC
3	GLOW	Comedy	Netflix
3	The Looming Tower	Limited	Hulu
3	Ozark	Drama	Netflix
3	Silicon Valley	Comedy	HBO
3	This Is Us	Drama	NBC
2	American Horror Story: Cult	Limited	FX
2	Curb Your Enthusiasm	Comedy	HBO
2	Genius: Picasso	Limited	Nat Geo
2	Killing Eve	Drama	BBC America
2	Steve Martin and Martin Short: An Evening You Will Forget for the Rest of Your Life	Variety	Netflix
2	Twin Peaks	Drama	Showtime
2	USS Callister (Black Mirror)	Movie	Netflix
2	Unbreakable Kimmy Schmidt	Comedy	Netflix

Nominations by network
Nominations	Network
37	Netflix
29	HBO
25	FX
19	NBC
12	Hulu
8	Showtime
6	ABC
6	Prime Video
5	CBS
3	BBC America
2	Comedy Central
2	Nat Geo
2	TBS

== Most major wins ==
Shows that received multiple awards
Wins	Show	Category	Network
5	The Marvelous Mrs. Maisel	Comedy	Prime Video
3	The Assassination of Gianni Versace: American Crime Story	Limited	FX
2	The Americans	Drama	FX
2	Barry	Comedy	HBO
2	The Crown	Drama	Netflix
2	Game of Thrones	Drama	HBO
2	Godless	Limited	Netflix

Wins by network
Wins	Network
7	Netflix
6	HBO
5	FX
5	Prime Video

== In Memoriam ==
- Anthony Bourdain
- Harry Anderson
- Bernie Casey
- Della Reese
- Jerry Van Dyke
- Craig Zadan
- Reg E. Cathey
- Steven Bochco
- Dick Enberg
- Lee Miller
- Suzanne Patmore Gibbs
- Bruce Margolis
- Jim Nabors
- Bill Daily
- Bob Schiller
- Paul Junger Witt
- David Ogden Stiers
- John Mahoney
- Thad Mumford
- Hugh Wilson
- Charlotte Rae
- Henri Bollinger
- David Cassidy
- Robert Guillaume
- Hugh Hefner
- Marian Rees
- Jimmy Nickerson
- Mitzi Shore
- Neil Simon
- Monty Hall
- Burt Reynolds
- Rose Marie
- John McCain
- Aretha Franklin
