= Nikki Crawford =

American stage actress

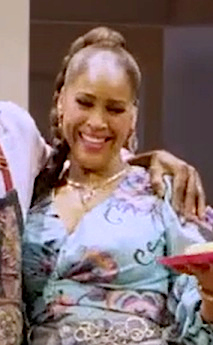
- Crawford as Tedra in Fat Ham 2023
- Born: Washington, D.C., U.S.
- Education: Carnegie Mellon University (BFA)
- Occupation: Actress

Nikki Crawford is an American stage, film, and television actress. Crawford is best known for her Tony-nominated portrayal of Tedra in James Ijames' 2022 Pulitzer Prize-winning play Fat Ham, first at the Public and then at the American Airlines Theatre.

== Career ==
Crawford was born and raised in Washington, D.C. After graduating from Carnegie Mellon University's drama program with her BFA in 1993, Crawford was offered a leading role in the European Tour of Bubbling Brown Sugar, which launched her career.

In the theater world, Crawford starred opposite Leslie Uggams in Stormy Weather at the Pasadena Playhouse, playing the young Lena Horne and winning the NAACP Theatre Award. She also received a Helen Hayes Award Best Supporting Actress nomination for Play On!.

Between the Public and Broadway iterations of Fat Ham, Crawford starred in James Ijames' The Most Spectacularly Lamentable Trial of Miz Martha Washington at Chicago's Steppenwolf Theatre.

In late 2025, Crawford recently wrapped on the pilot Very Young Frankenstein starring Zack Galifianakis and directed by Taika Waititi for FX/Hulu.

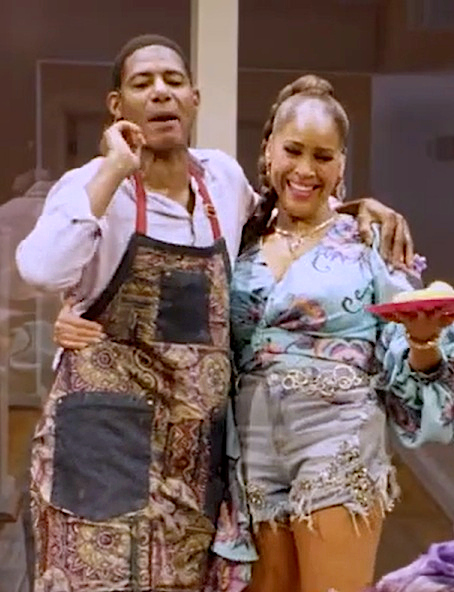
Nikki Crawford as Tedra in Fat Ham 2023

== Theatre credits ==
Year(s)	Production	Role	Location	Category	Ref
1999	Play On!	Lady Liv	Pasadena Playhouse	Regional	
2002	A Class Act	Felicia	Pasadena Playhouse	Regional	
2004	The Ten Commandments	Ensemble			
2007	Spamalot	Lady of the Lake	Wynn Las Vegas		
2008	Respect: The Girl Em-Powered Musical		El Portal Forum Theatre		
2009	Stormy Weather	Young Lena	Pasadena Playhouse	Regional	
2013	Show Boat	Julie	Wells Fargo Pavilion		
2017	Man of La Mancha	Aldonza/Dulcinea	La Mirada Theatre for the Performing Arts		
2019	Fairview	Beverly	Woolly Mammoth Theatre Company		
2020	The Most Spectacularly Lamentable Trial of Miz Martha Washington	Ann Dandrige	Steppenwolf Theatre Company		
2022	Fat Ham	Tedra	The Public Theater	Off-Broadway	
2023	Fat Ham	Tedra	American Airlines Theatre	Broadway	
2024	Fat Ham	Tedra	Geffen Playhouse	Regional	

== Awards and nominations ==
Year	Award	Category	Role	Show	Result	Ref
2001	Helen Hayes Awards	Outstanding Supporting Performer, Resident Musical	Lady Liv	Play On!	Nominated	
2010	NAACP Theatre Awards	Best Lead Actress-Equity	Young Lena	Stormy Weather	Won	
2023	Tony Awards	Best Featured Actress in a Play	Tedra	Fat Ham	Nominated	
2024	Los Angeles Drama Critics Circle Awards	Featured Performance	Tedra	Fat Ham		

== Filmography ==
=== Film ===
Year	Title	Role	Notes	Ref
1997	Wag the Dog	Mom	Feature film	
2000	Retiring Tatiana	Tatiana	Feature film	
2005	Duck	Bus Driver	Feature film	
2009	Applause for Miss E	Sista Burns	Feature film	
2012	Contradictions of the Heart	Patrice	DTV	
2016	96 Souls	Nina Orleans	Feature film	
2016	Dance Night Obsession	Detective Brecht	Feature film	
2019	Desperate Waters	District Attorney Grace	Feature film	
2020	How to Deter a Robber	Officer Martin	Feature film	
2022	A Country Christmas Harmony	Carole Dukes	TV film	

=== Television ===
Year	Title	Role	Notes	Ref
1991	A Different World	Girl	Guest appearance	
1994	Living Single	Renatta	Guest appearance	
1995	Dream On	Colette Perry	Guest appearance	
1996	Martin	Woman #3	Guest appearance	
1996	Homeboys in Outer Space	Heather	Guest appearance	
2001	The District	Reporter #2	Guest appearance	
2004	Malcolm in the Middle	Nell	Guest appearance	
2006	Numb3rs	ER Doctor	Guest appearance	
2013	Happily Divorced	Monica	Guest appearance	
2014	Legit	Dr. Pollitt	Guest appearance	
2015	Switched at Birth	Kendall Booth	Guest appearance	
2016	Pretty Little Liars	Agent Leigh	Guest appearance	
2017	Criminal Minds	Marla Grace	Guest appearance	
2019	9-1-1	Leticia Barry	Guest appearance	
2019	Crown Lake	Valerie St. Martin	Recurring role	
2020	Two Degrees	Nikki	Guest appearance	
2021	Selena: The Series	Tina Knowles	Recurring role	
2022	United States of Al	Barbara	Guest appearance	
2024	Cruel Intentions	Mrs. Grover	Guest appearance	
2024	Elsbeth	Solani Mani	Guest appearance	
2024	Tracker	Miggy	Guest appearance	
2026	Days of Our Lives	Lexie Carver	Recurring role	
TBA	Very Young Frankenstein	TBA	TBA	

=== Web ===
Year(s)	Title	Role	Notes	Ref
2012–2013	H+	Julie Martin	10 episodes (web series)	
