= List of The Loud House episodes =

The Loud House is an American animated sitcom created by Chris Savino that premiered on Nickelodeon on May 2, 2016. The series focuses on Lincoln Loud, the middle and only male child in a house full of girls, who often breaks the fourth wall to explain to viewers the chaotic conditions and sibling relationships of the household.

== Series overview ==
Season	Segments	Episodes	Originally released	
Season	Segments	Episodes	First released	Last released
1	52	26	May 2, 2016	November 8, 2016
2	49	26	November 9, 2016	December 1, 2017
3	48	26	January 19, 2018	March 7, 2019
4	50	26	May 27, 2019	July 23, 2020
5	47	26	September 11, 2020	March 4, 2022
6	49	26	March 11, 2022	May 16, 2023
7	38	20	May 17, 2023	June 6, 2024
8	22	13	June 10, 2024	July 25, 2025
9	35	20	August 1, 2025	April 24, 2026
10	17	9	May 1, 2026	TBA
11	TBA	TBA	TBA	TBA

== Episodes ==
Most of the episodes have premiered in pairs of two eleven-minute stories, while others were released on their own, totaling 315 blocks of episodes. The episodes are listed under the broadcast order, and not according to the original production or Nickelodeon's packaging order (the order mainly used for streaming services).

=== Season 1 (2016) ===
Every episode and segment of this season was directed by Chris Savino, with him co-directing with Kyle Marshall in the episode "The Price of Admission"/"One Flu Over the Loud House" (#125).

No. overall	No. in season	Title	Written by	Storyboarded by	Original release date	Prod. code	U.S. viewers (millions)
1	1	"Left in the Dark"	Story by : Chris Savino & Karla Sakas Shropshire; Teleplay by : Chris Savino	Chris Savino	May 2, 2016 (Note: This episode was shown before its official television premiere at San Diego Comic-Con on July 11, 2015. The episode was also screened at a television festival on February 5, 2016.)	101	2.07
1	1	"Get the Message"	Alec Schwimmer	Kyle Marshall	May 2, 2016	101	2.07
2	2	"Heavy Meddle"	Ava Tramer	Miguel Puga	May 3, 2016	102	1.79
2	2	"Making the Case"	Karla Sakas Shropshire	Darin McGowan	May 3, 2016	102	1.79
3	3	"Along Came a Sister"	Karla Sakas Shropshire	Jordan Rosato	May 4, 2016	112	1.80
3	3	"Chore and Peace"	Alec Schwimmer	Ed Baker	May 4, 2016	112	1.80
4	4	"Project Loud House"	Chris Savino & Michael Rubiner	Chris Savino	May 5, 2016	105	1.79
4	4	"In Tents Debate"	Bob Mittenthal	Ed Baker	May 5, 2016	105	1.79
5	5	"The Sweet Spot"	Kevin Sullivan	Kyle Marshall	May 6, 2016	104	1.74
5	5	"A Tale of Two Tables"	Michael Rubiner	Darin McGowan	May 6, 2016	104	1.74
6	6	"Driving Miss Hazy"	Karla Sakas Shropshire	Jordan Rosato	May 9, 2016	103A	1.74
7	7	"No Guts, No Glori"	Haley Mancini	Miguel Puga	May 10, 2016	103B	1.85
8	8	"Picture Perfect"	Scott Kreamer	Ed Baker	May 11, 2016	107A	1.87
9	9	"Undie Pressure"	Alec Schwimmer	Violaine Briat	May 12, 2016	107B	1.77
10	10	"Linc or Swim"	Karla Sakas Shropshire	Jordan Rosato	May 13, 2016	108A	1.84
11	11	"Hand-Me-Downer"	Michael Rubiner	Ed Baker	May 16, 2016	110A	1.86
12	12	"Sleuth or Consequences"	Whitney Wetta & Sammie Crowley	Kyle Marshall	May 17, 2016	110B	1.65
13	13	"Changing the Baby"	Alec Schwimmer	Violaine Briat	May 18, 2016	108B	1.65
14	14	"Sound of Silence"	Michael Rubiner	Jordan Rosato	May 19, 2016	106A	1.79
15	15	"Space Invader"	Story by : Chris Savino & Karla Sakas Shropshire; Teleplay by : Chris Savino	Chris Savino	May 20, 2016	106B	1.75
16	16	"For Bros About to Rock"	Alec Schwimmer	Darin McGowan	June 6, 2016	113A	1.82
17	17	"Ties That Bind"	Karla Sakas Shropshire	Miguel Puga	June 7, 2016	109B	1.85
18	18	"The Green House"	Bob Mittenthal	Miguel Puga	June 8, 2016	111B	1.88
19	19	"Butterfly Effect"	Kevin Sullivan	Violaine Briat	June 9, 2016	111A	1.94
20	20	"It's a Loud, Loud, Loud, Loud House"	Chris Savino	Kyle Marshall	June 10, 2016	113B	1.70
21	21	"House Music"	Kevin Sullivan	Violaine Briat	July 18, 2016	117A	1.94
22	22	"Two Boys and a Baby"	Karla Sakas Shropshire	Jordan Koch	July 19, 2016	114B	2.28
23	23	"Overnight Success"	Kevin Sullivan	Darin McGowan	July 20, 2016	109A	2.15
24	24	"Toads and Tiaras"	Whitney Wetta & Sammie Crowley	Violaine Briat	July 21, 2016	114A	1.95
25	25	"A Novel Idea"	Alec Schwimmer	Jordan Koch	July 22, 2016	117B	1.80
26	26	"Cover Girls"	Sheela Shrinivas	Miguel Puga	August 1, 2016	115A	2.16
27	27	"Out on a Limo"	Alec Schwimmer	Kyle Marshall	August 2, 2016	116B	2.21
28	28	"Attention Deficit"	Kevin Sullivan	Darin McGowan	August 3, 2016	116A	2.00
29	29	"Save the Date"	Karla Sakas Shropshire	Jordan Rosato	August 4, 2016	115B	1.99
30	30	"Come Sale Away"	Story by : Greg Grabianski; Teleplay by : Sheela Shrinivas	Kyle Marshall	September 12, 2016	119B	1.66
31	31	"Lincoln Loud: Girl Guru"	Whitney Wetta & Sammie Crowley	Darin McGowan	September 13, 2016	119A	1.64
32	32	"Roughin' It"	Karla Sakas Shropshire	Jordan Koch	September 14, 2016	120A	1.52
33	33	"The Waiting Game"	Kevin Sullivan	Violaine Briat	September 15, 2016	120B	1.70
34	34	"The Loudest Yard"	Bob Mittenthal	Miguel Puga	September 16, 2016	121A	1.76
35	35	"Dance, Dance Resolution"	Story by : Amaris Cavin; Teleplay by : Alec Schwimmer	Violaine Briat	September 19, 2016	122A	1.67
36	36	"A Fair to Remember"	Kevin Sullivan	Darin McGowan	September 20, 2016	122B	1.73
37	37	"A Tattler's Tale"	Sammie Crowley & Whitney Wetta	Jordan Koch	September 21, 2016	123B	1.82
38	38	"Homespun"	Karla Sakas Shropshire	Jordan Koch	September 22, 2016	126B	1.92
39	39	"April Fools' Rules"	Sammie Crowley & Whitney Wetta	Miguel Puga	September 23, 2016	118A	1.95
40	40	"The Price of Admission"	Sheela Shrinivas	Kyle Marshall	October 15, 2016	125	1.82
40	40	"One Flu Over the Loud House"	Alec Schwimmer	Kyle Marshall	October 15, 2016	125	1.82
41	41	"One of the Boys"	Kevin Sullivan	Jordan Rosato	October 17, 2016	123A	1.72
42	42	"Cereal Offender"	Karla Sakas Shropshire	Jordan Rosato	October 18, 2016	118B	1.72
43	43	"Raw Deal"	Karla Sakas Shropshire	Jordan Rosato	October 19, 2016	121B	1.72
44	44	"Study Muffin"	Michael Rubiner	Violaine Briat	October 20, 2016	126A	1.84
45	45	"Funny Business"	Karla Sakas Shropshire	Miguel Puga	November 7, 2016	124A	2.00
46	46	"Snow Bored"	Whitney Wetta & Sammie Crowley	Darin McGowan	November 8, 2016	124B	1.73

=== Season 2 (2016–17) ===
All episodes and segments of this season were produced by Karen Malach, and most were directed by Chris Savino, with him co-directing with Kyle Marshall on the episodes "The Old and the Restless" (#202B), "Vantastic Voyage" (#205B), and "Patching Things Up" (#206A). The only episodes in this season Savino did not direct were "Frog Wild" (#208B), "Pulp Friction" (#211A), "Room with a Feud" (#214B), "Garage Banned" (#217B), "Change of Heart" (#218A), "Friend or Faux?" (#220B), "Mall of Duty" (#222B), "The Crying Dame" (#225A), and "Snow Way Out" (#226A), all were directed by Kyle Marshall.

No. overall	No. in season	Title	Written by	Storyboard by	Original release date	Prod. code	U.S. viewers (millions)
47	1	"Intern for the Worse"	Story by : Darin McGowan; Teleplay by : Bob Mittenthal	Darin McGowan	November 9, 2016	202A	1.77
At Royal Woods Elementary's intern fair, Lincoln and Clyde gain internship to work for Flip at "Flip's Food & Fuel." As they work there, they soon end up in a fight over a special cup which Flip takes advantage of for his own personal gain.
48	2	"The Old and the Restless"	Alec Schwimmer	Kyle Marshall	November 10, 2016	202B	1.82
Lincoln arrives at Sunset Canyon Retirement Home to visit Pop-Pop for the day, but every activity they try to do is stopped by the strict nurse Sue (Veronica Cartwright). When Lincoln plans to take Pop-Pop out for the day, he must get him back to Sunset Canyon Retirement Home before 6:00 or else Sue will evict Pop-Pop.
49	3	"11 Louds a Leapin'"	Sammie Crowley, Whitney Wetta & Kevin Sullivan	Jordan Rosato & Miguel Puga	November 25, 2016	201	2.24
On Christmas Eve, the Loud family does various things to prepare for Christmas. Lincoln's sled Big Red accidentally goes into his neighbor Mr. Grouse's yard, and he and Clyde work to get it back. Upon discovering a few secrets about Mr. Grouse, Lincoln rallies his family and the McBrides in order to lift Mr. Grouse's spirits. Note: Lynn Loud Sr. and Rita Loud's faces are finally revealed in this episode.
50	4	"Suite and Sour"	Sammie Crowley & Whitney Wetta	Miguel Puga	January 9, 2017	204A	1.90
Lynn Sr. and Rita have saved enough money to spend a relaxing weekend at the Royal Woods Spa & Hotel. Not wanting to be left at Aunt Ruth's house, Lincoln and his sisters put on two different plays about each location that persuades their parents to take them to the Royal Woods Spa & Hotel. As Lynn Sr. and Rita try to relax, Lincoln and his sisters unknowingly cause chaos in the hotel.
51	5	"Baby Steps"	Karla Sakas Shropshire	Violaine Briat	January 10, 2017	203A	1.91
After overhearing his parents, Clyde thinks that he is getting a sibling. Upon informing Lincoln of this, Clyde is trained in the three Cs: Confidence, Caring, and Cookies. Lincoln then takes Clyde to show him how he handles the situations involving Lucy, Lana, Lola, Lisa, and Lily.
52	6	"Brawl in the Family"	Kevin Sullivan	Jordan Koch	January 11, 2017	203B	2.06
Lincoln finds out that Lori and Leni had a fight over the same dress. His first attempt to get Lori and Leni to make up results in making the Sister Fight Protocol that everyone observes become intense. Lynn Sr. and Rita abide by the protocol and do not want to take sides. After Lincoln's second attempt, the Sister Fight Protocol gets worse when the rest of his sisters get into fights with each other.
53	7	"Back in Black"	Gloria Shen	Jordan Rosato	January 12, 2017	204B	1.99
As Lincoln and his friend Rusty Spokes work on a science project, Lucy develops a crush on Rusty's brother Rocky who Lincoln thinks is a "regular and normal boy." In order to impress Rocky, Lucy enlists the help of her fellow sisters, who give her a makeover.
54	8	"The Whole Picture"	Story by : Darin McGowan; Teleplay by : Gloria Shen	Jordan Rosato	February 21, 2017	207B	1.71
Lincoln tries to make space on the Loud family's computer for a picture of his first moustache hair only to accidentally delete all of his childhood photos. In order to replace them, Lincoln has Clyde help him reenact each picture by taking the place of his sisters when none of them are available to help due to a sale at the Royal Woods Mall.
55	9	"Lock 'n' Loud"	Bob Mittenthal	Miguel Puga	February 22, 2017	207A	1.71
Lynn Sr. gets irritated when his children constantly disobeying his order to lock the door. To make themselves prepared for burglars, Lincoln and his sisters do various things, such as storing their possessions in the bathroom, defending themselves, and enlisting the help of Bobby in Mall Cop attire and Lynn Jr.'s roller derby team in order to protect their house.
56	10	"Vantastic Voyage"	Kevin Sullivan	Kyle Marshall	February 23, 2017	205B	1.58
As Vanzilla keeps breaking down and Lynn Sr. refuses to get rid of it (as it had been previously owned by his father and his grandfather), his children and Rita trick him into getting another car. He soon gets hooked on his new van to the point where he does not want his children and wife to even go near it. This causes Lori and Leni to work to obtain their own vehicle and the others to try to get Vanzilla back. But it gets a little tricky when Lynn Sr. gets matching accessories.
57	11	"Making the Grade"	Alec Schwimmer	Darin McGowan	February 24, 2017	205A	1.92
Lisa gets promoted to Lincoln's class. In order to be average like the rest of her class, she gets her eyes fixed and joins Lincoln's circle of friends. Lisa frames Lincoln for the change, causing all her fellow sisters to blame him.
58	12	"No Such Luck"	Karla Sakas Shropshire	Darin McGowan	March 13, 2017	208A	2.11
When Lynn Jr.'s softball team loses when Lincoln shows up to watch her softball game with the family for the first time, she assumes that Lincoln is unlucky, prompting him to tell the rest of his sisters not to bring him to any of their events after Lynn tells Leni not to bring Lincoln to her event. Lincoln takes advantage of this at first, until the entire family begins taking their suspicion too seriously to point of excluding him from family outings and eventually throwing him out of the house, forcing Lincoln to have to work to prove that he is not bad luck.
59	13	"Frog Wild"	Story by : Darin McGowan; Teleplay by : Kevin Sullivan	Ari Castleton & Kyle Marshall	March 14, 2017	208B	1.68
Mrs. Johnson is planning to have her class dissect frogs. At first, Lincoln is interested in it until Lana convinces him that it is wrong. The two of them and Lana's pet frog Hops work to smuggle the frogs out of school before dissection, while avoiding being caught by Principal Wilbur T. Huggins.
60	14	"Patching Things Up"	Karla Sakas Shropshire	Ed Baker	March 15, 2017	206A	1.76
When the Bluebell Scouts are holding a membership event, Lana and Lola both try out for the group, where they are both talented at different initiation parts. Meanwhile, Lincoln and Clyde work to get the Bluebell Scout Cookies that the Bluebell Scouts sell.
61	15	"Cheater by the Dozen"	Whitney Wetta & Sammie Crowley	Jordan Koch	March 16, 2017	206B	2.06
Lincoln and Clyde notice that Bobby has been behaving shiftily. Thinking that Bobby is cheating on Lori upon seeing him interact with various different women, Lincoln and Clyde investigate, which soon leads to the rest of Lincoln's sisters getting involved.
62	16	"Kick the Bucket List"	Story by : Gloria Shen; Teleplay by : Whitney Wetta & Sammie Crowley	Violaine Briat	April 10, 2017	209A	1.74
Lincoln and Clyde have made plans for spring break. When Clyde's dads take him to Hawaii for 8 days of vacation, Lincoln and Clyde must complete everything on their list before the last vacation day ends.
63	17	"Party Down"	Eric Acosta	Jordan Koch	April 11, 2017	209B	1.93
While her parents go out, Lori throws a sophisticated party and does things by a magazine with the help of Leni and Bobby. But the sophisticated party games do not seem to interest any of Lori and Leni's friends. Displeased that they were not invited, Lincoln persuades his other sisters into throwing a non-sophisticated party.
64	18	"Fed Up"	Jacob Fleisher	Miguel Puga	April 12, 2017	210A	1.91
When they are bored with the same meals that Lynn Sr. makes them every day of the week, Lincoln and his sisters plan to sabotage Lynn Sr.'s dinner plans in various ways so that he would order pizza. Once this happens and Lynn Sr. discovers the goulash ingredients in his clothes, he is enraged. The children plan to show them that mixing up the menu is easy by making a potluck dinner for their parents with disastrous and comical results.
65	19	"Shell Shock"	Karla Sakas Shropshire	Jordan Rosato	April 13, 2017	210B	1.75
For a parenting project that involves watching an egg, Mrs. Johnson has the students pair up and Lincoln is paired up with Ronnie Anne. Lincoln worries about Ronnie Anne watching the egg due to her supposedly destructive ways. Meanwhile, Clyde is paired up with Penelope as his partner.
66	20	"Pulp Friction"	Karla Sakas Shropshire	Ari Castleton & Kyle Marshall	April 14, 2017	211A	1.65
There is a contest where whoever submits a good Ace Savvy comic, the winner will meet Ace Savvy's creator Bill Buck. Lincoln and Clyde plan to submit one that features superhero ally versions of Lincoln's sisters called the Full House Gang who help fight the evil Wild Card Willy. They are foiled by Principal Huggins, who confiscates their comic and gives them detention. Lincoln's sisters must help him and Clyde reclaim the comic so that it can be mailed before it is too late.
67	21	"Pets Peeved"	Story by : Darin McGowan; Teleplay by : Kevin Sullivan	Darin McGowan	May 15, 2017	211B	1.91
Lana has brought home a dog named Watterson who followed her home from the park. Jealous of the attention that Watterson is taking from them, the Loud pets Charles, Cliff, Geo, and Walt work to get rid of Watterson, which leads to them sending him to the Green Mile Pet Sanctuary. When they regret this decision, the pets must rescue Watterson while avoiding the animal control officers Corinne and Schmitty.
68	22	"Out of the Picture"	Matt Brailey	Darin McGowan	May 16, 2017	214A	1.83
In a plan not to be forgotten students at Royal Woods Elementary, Lincoln and Clyde decide to do whatever it takes to get into the yearbook with Coach Pacowski overseeing its production. Meanwhile, Lola works to get her own good photo in the yearbook. But little do the boys realize is getting into a yearbook is not the easiest task.
69	23	"Room with a Feud"	Sammie Crowley & Whitney Wetta	Ari Castleton	May 17, 2017	214B	1.75
Displeased with the roommate rumbles over various reasons, Lincoln gives his sisters a compatibility test to see who they are best suited for. When the test later proves disastrous due to it being taken from an Ace Savvy comic, Lisa uses a machine she originally built to help Pop-Pop find a new love interest to find better matches with one result pairing Lincoln with Lily.
70	24	"Spell It Out"	Karla Sakas Shropshire	Jordan Koch	May 18, 2017	215B	1.74
Lucy becomes tired of her siblings walking all over her. Using a spellbook that was previously owned by her Great-Grandma Harriet, Lucy uses the spells to teach her siblings a lesson. When her siblings are unable to speak after they watched a shuffleboard event that Pop-Pop was partaking in, Lucy must find a way to reverse this spell.
71	25	"The Loudest Mission: Relative Chaos"	Sammie Crowley, Daniel Dominguez & Whitney Wetta	Miguel Puga & Jordan Rosato	May 29, 2017	213	2.01
Mrs. Santiago takes her children Bobby and Ronnie Anne to Great Lakes City in the next state over to see their relatives the Casagrande family whom Ronnie Anne cannot stand due to their smothering nature and the threat of a scary black cats that recently moved in to their neighborhood. Soon, Ronnie Anne finds out that Mrs. Santiago wants to move her family in with the Casagrande family because of a new job. Not wanting this to happen to Bobby and Ronnie Anne upon being informed of it, Lori and Lincoln head out to persuade Bobby not to let this happen.
72	26	"Back Out There"	Eric Acosta	Violaine Briat	June 12, 2017	215A	1.75
Clyde is worried that Lincoln is hung up on Ronnie Anne ever since she, Bobby, and her mother moved in with the Casagrande family when he keeps visiting their old house. In order to help Lincoln out, Clyde enlists the rest of his and Lincoln's closest friends Liam, Rusty, and Zach to help Lincoln get over it.
73	27	"Fool's Paradise"	Whitney Wetta & Sammie Crowley	Miguel Puga	June 13, 2017	216A	1.73
April Fools' Day is approaching as the Loud Family discover a brochure for a clown camp, which they drop Luan off at. When they stop at a motel, strange pranks start happening to them such as the van breaking down unexpectedly. Thinking that Luan is somehow behind this upon his fellow family members getting pranked one by one, Lincoln figures out that Luan has someone on the inside of the Loud family secretly helping her.
74	28	"Potty Mouth"	Michael Rubiner	Violaine Briat	June 14, 2017	212A	1.81
When Lincoln and his sisters hear Lily say the "D Word" (since they tend to unwittingly say it), they work to make Lily forget the "D Word" before an interview with Dr. Shuttleworth to see if Lily is ready for daycare. When this attempt fails, the Loud siblings must find a way to keep Lily from saying the "D Word."
75	29	"L Is for Love"	Story by : Darin McGowan; Teleplay by : Kevin Sullivan	Jordan Koch	June 15, 2017	212B	1.89
A secret admirer letter addressed to L. Loud shows up at the Loud House and Lincoln and his sisters think that it is for one of them. Thinking it is their ideal crushes, the siblings do various things to their ideal crushes to figure out who sent the letter. The next letter narrows it down to Luna, Luan, Lynn, and Lisa due to them having brown hair.
76	30	"ARGGH! You for Real?"	Eric Acosta	Darin McGowan	July 24, 2017	217	1.68
76	30	"Garage Banned"	Bob Mittenthal	Ari Castleton	July 24, 2017	217	1.68
Clyde & Lincoln's favorite show ARRGH! comes to Royal Woods for a tour. They get to go inside the haunted house to see all the action, but realize that the ghost hunting show's host Hunter Spector fakes his ghost-hunting. This leaves Clyde in a state of mind where he considers everything fake much to the dismay of Howard who is advised by Harold not to call Dr. Lopez while she is on vacation. This leaves it up to Lincoln to recruit Hunter Spector to convince Clyde to start believing again. After being continuously annoyed by her siblings when trying to talk to Bobby, Lori decides to move into the garage to assert her independence. However, she soon misses her family and wants to move back into the house. Lori does not want to inform her family of this, believing her siblings would never let her live it down. She then does various things to cause problems to the garage in order to move back into the house.
77	31	"Job Insecurity"	Kevin Sullivan	Jordan Rosato	July 25, 2017	216B	1.76
When the Loud siblings head to the office building where Lynn Sr. works as an IT worker, they learn from an employee that Lynn Sr. no longer works there and they think that the events of the last time the children were at his office resulted in him getting fired. When they find Lynn Sr. working as a dishwasher at a Hawaiian/Russian fusion restaurant called the Aloha Comrade, the Loud siblings plan to find their father a better IT job with the help of Mr. Grouse. However, they do not know the real reason why Lynn Sr. no longer works at his old job.
78	32	"Change of Heart"	Karla Sakas Shropshire	Kyle Marshall & Paul Watling	July 26, 2017	218A	1.71
After Clyde has another fainting experience when Lori answers the door, Lori wishes for Clyde to act normal around her. In order to help Clyde, Lincoln decides to bring Leni in to help with the situation, unknowingly stirring up jealousy in Lori when it appears that Clyde has shifted his feelings for her towards Leni. She desperately tries to win Clyde back after a while.
79	33	"Health Kicked"	Kevin Sullivan	Jordan Koch	July 27, 2017	218B	1.79
The children decide to get Rita and Lynn Sr. to start working out to get them in shape. However, they take exercising too far and push it onto the children. When the children tamper with the scale to fool their parents and get them to cease their rigorous exercise routine, it backfires when Rita and Lynn Sr. enter the Royal Woods Ultra Extreme Ninja Competition.
80	34	"Lynner Takes All"	Sammie Crowley & Whitney Wetta	Miguel Puga	July 28, 2017	219B	1.54
Lynn Jr. is a sore winner when playing board games with her siblings. As they are tired with Lynn always showboating and gloating after every win, Lincoln and his other sisters team up in an attempt to take Lynn down by playing a game that would put her against all of them. When this plan works, Lynn suddenly turns everything into a competition with her siblings to make up for her defeat. This leads to them challenging Lynn to have a rematch with a plan to throw the game.
81	35	"Future Tense"	Eric Acosta	Jordan Rosato	September 18, 2017	219A	1.76
Lynn Sr. and Rita meet the Yates Family, consisting of Jancey (Maureen McCormick) and Bumper Yates Sr. (Barry Williams) and their children Beatrix Yates, Belle Yates, Bumper Yates Jr., and Beau Yates. As they see that the Yates Family have an impressive life, Lynn Sr. and Rita think that their children are not doing enough to ensure their successful futures, and they have them do various things to make them more well-rounded like the Yates Family.
82	36	"Yes Man"	Alan Van Dyke	Darin McGowan	September 19, 2017	220A	1.66
Overhearing Lincoln claiming to be the "Master of Convincing" as he prepares to get money for the ticket for a SMOOCH concert, Luna asks Lincoln to give her advice to convince their parents to give her the money to purchase a sweat-covered T-shirt previously worn by Mick Swagger at an auction. After his other sisters take Lincoln's advice for their own items, Lincoln tries to convince his parents to give him money in order to get the SMOOCH concert ticket, unaware that his parents used up all the money for his sisters.
83	37	"Friend or Faux?"	Karla Sakas Shropshire	Ari Castleton	September 20, 2017	220B	1.59
Lisa gets an F on her first report card because she failed "Social Skills" by not making a single human friend in class. In order for Ms. Shrinivas to raise her grade, Lisa must make a human friend and does field research by observing her fellow family members in their respective friendships. After meeting Darcy Helmandollar and befriending her to raise her grade, Lisa finds that Darcy has become too friendly enough to disrupt some of Lisa's activities.
84	38	"No Laughing Matter"	Kevin Sullivan	Violaine Briat	September 21, 2017	221A	1.60
Luan prepares for the Junior Comedians Contest at the Chortle Portal on Saturday. Upon overhearing her siblings claiming that her jokes are not funny, Luan gives up comedy and starts acting normal. After failing to do joke start-ups to get Luan back into doing comedy, Lincoln and the rest of his sisters must take drastic measures to get Luan back into her comedic roots.
85	39	"Tricked!"	Kevin Sullivan, Whitney Wetta & Sammie Crowley	Ari Castleton & Violaine Briat	October 13, 2017	224	2.17
On Halloween, Lincoln and Clyde plan to go to the fancy gated community of Huntington Manor at Huntington Oaks in order to get full-sized candy bars. Meanwhile, Lucy assembles a haunted corn maze and operates it with the help of Lori, Leni, Luna, Luan, Lynn Jr., and Rita. Also, Lana, Lola, Lisa, and Lily compete to see who will get more candy than the others as a Halloween-disliking Lynn Sr. escorts them. When Hank and Hawk arrives to destroy Franklin Avenue's Halloween and steal everybody's candy, Lincoln and Clyde decides to save Halloween from Hank and Hawk by getting the candy back.
86	40	"No Spoilers"	Eric Acosta	Jordan Koch	October 16, 2017	221B	1.76
Leni has been known to ruin birthday surprises for her siblings. To keep Leni from ruining the family's surprise birthday party for Rita, Lincoln must work to keep Leni away from the party preparations as the rest of Lincoln's sisters work to get the party ready and have the invitations sent out.
87	41	"Read Aloud"	Karla Sakas Shropshire	Darin McGowan	October 17, 2017	223A	1.83
The library is holding a contest that is overseen by the librarian Molly Wetta in which whoever reads the most books will win a private party at the Spunk E. Pigeon Pizza Palooza Paradise. However, Lola thinks that reading is boring and refuses to participate, causing Lincoln and the rest of his family to try to convince her that reading can be fun. But little does the family know, there is a shocking reason why Lola hates reading.
88	42	"Not a Loud"	Eric Acosta	Jordan Koch	October 18, 2017	223B	1.67
While going through the attic with Clyde to find his birth story, Lincoln finds the birth story section in his baby book empty. When his parents give him inconsistent information about it, Lincoln becomes suspicious, and he and Clyde try to get to the bottom of the missing info by asking Lincoln's five older sisters' their sides of the story.
89	43	"Legends"	Whitney Wetta & Sammie Crowley	Miguel Puga	November 11, 2017	222	1.39
89	43	"Mall of Duty"	Jacob Fleisher	Jordan Rosato	November 11, 2017	222	1.39
Lincoln and Lynn Sr. find a way to bond by partaking in a father-son episode of Legends of the Hidden Temple hosted by Kirk Fogg. As the Orange Iguanas, Lincoln and Lynn Sr. end up in a fierce competition against the bullying father-son duo Stan Stankco (Cooper Barnes) and Steak Stankco (Jace Norman) in an Atlantis-themed episode in the quest to obtain the Map to Atlantis. While babysitting Lucy, Lana, Lola, Lisa, and Lily since Lynn Sr. and Rita are away with his older sisters, Lincoln ends up taking his younger sisters to the Royal Woods Mall to attend a book-signing of survivalist Rip Hardcore (Bert Kreischer). When Lincoln loses his younger sisters after getting the book signed, he must round them up and get them home before his parents and older sisters return.
90	44	"The Crying Dame"	Alan J. Van Dyke	Miguel Puga	November 24, 2017	225	1.68
90	44	"Anti-Social"	Karla Sakas Shropshire	Jordan Rosato	November 24, 2017	225	1.68
Lily has been crying a lot for no reason. When her siblings give her a singing toy from the attic called Fenton the Feel Better Fox that Lily takes a liking to, it soon starts to annoy Lily's siblings as Lynn Sr. and Rita had previously warned them. When Lynn Sr. declares war on the modern technologies of his children, they must show him the wonders of it. Once that is done, Lynn Sr. starts to get hooked on each of the modern technologies enough for him to neglect his duties. Regretting this, the family shows him that moderation is key in technology.
91	45	"Snow Way Out"	Karla Sakas Shropshire	Ari Castleton	December 1, 2017	226	1.73
91	45	"Snow Way Down"	Kevin Sullivan	Darin McGowan	December 1, 2017	226	1.73
While Lynn Sr. and Rita are away, racing champion Bobbie Fletcher (Karsyn Elledge) is holding a contest at the Burpin' Burger where the person who finds the burger wrapper that has a tire mark on it becomes an honorary member of her pit crew. Lana takes advantage of the contest and competes with Flip. The Loud siblings soon end up trapped inside during a snowstorm and it is up to Lana to get them out before they will be stuck in cold forever. Lincoln joins Clyde and his dads on their winter vacation to their winter lodge. Lincoln sees how Howard and Harold can be overprotective of him. Even though Clyde wants them to let go, they still want to make sure. In order to prove himself to his dads, Clyde plans to go down the condemned Ramp of Insanity. Note: On the original airing, the order of the segments for this episode is reversed. The order was corrected on reruns and streaming services, as well as on DVD sets where episodes are listed in the packaged order.

=== Season 3 (2018–19) ===
No. overall	No. in season	Title	Directed by	Written by	Storyboard by	Original release date	Prod. code	U.S. viewers (millions)
92	1	"Roadie to Nowhere"	Kyle Marshall	Bob Mittenthal	Jordan Koch	January 19, 2018	303	1.77
92	1	"A Fridge Too Far"	Kyle Marshall	Jeff Sayers	Ari Castleton	January 19, 2018	303	1.77
After winning her high school's Royal Rumble audition, Luna learns that her roadie, Chunk, was a musician who headlined a rumble when he was younger. Luna worries that she will fail to make it as a musician like Chunk supposedly did, and she tries to find other ventures to be associated with music, like music stores and karaoke bars. When that fails, Luna takes Lisa's advice to follow the most common non-music ventures, until she finds out some other facts about Chunk. Lincoln finds out that his three Mac and Cheese Bites have been reduced to two, and he goes to war with his sisters to protect his leftovers by booby-trapping the fridge, which results in an all-out war in the refrigerator, until he creates separate color-coded sections with Lisa's help. Meanwhile, Lynn Sr. plans to make food for traveling investor Timothy McCole (Bill Mumy) as part of his plans to obtain his own restaurant, where he unknowingly puts his food in the color-coded areas.
93	2	"Selfie Improvement"	Amanda Rynda	Karla Sakas Shropshire	Violaine Briat	January 26, 2018	304	1.53
93	2	"No Place Like Homeschool"	Chris Savino	Alan J. Van Dyke	Jordan Koch	January 26, 2018	304	1.53
Lori discovers that her longtime rival Carol Pingrey has gotten more likes than her on her first photo on a social media site. She takes drastic measures to get more likes than Carol, putting up with interference from her siblings and neglecting her regular chat with Bobby (who has an upcoming dentist appointment) in the process. Lola is being homeschooled by Lynn Sr. and Rita during pageant season so that she can get ready for her pageants. In order to get more time for their own projects and interests, Lincoln and his other sisters decide to be homeschooled as well, but they discover that it is not as easy as it appears to be and ask Lola to walk them through it.
94	3	"White Hare"	Chris Savino	Chris Savino	Violaine Briat	February 2, 2018	302	1.61
94	3	"Insta-gran"	Chris Savino	Sammie Crowley & Whitney Wetta	Darin McGowan	February 2, 2018	302	1.61
When a new girl in Royal Woods enrolls at Royal Woods Elementary, Lincoln tries to find a way to properly introduce himself to her on the bus without getting his sisters involved after what happened in "Heavy Meddle". After hitting his head on a tree near a rabbit hole, Lincoln dreams that he is a rabbit named Warren who goes through a similar phase with his 25 rabbit sisters Betty, Beverly, Blair, Brenda, Barbara, Bodhi, Bebe, Bippa, Bailey, Bella, Bernadette, Beulah, Beatrice, Blanch, Bethany, Brie, Bernice, Bertha, Bianca, Brooke, Belinda, Birdie, Beth, Brandy, and Bridget. Pop-Pop comes to have dinner with the Loud family and reveals that he has a new girlfriend named Myrtle, who was told everything about the children by Pop-Pop. The next day, Myrtle comes over and starts trying to impress the children and smothering them with affection, much to their annoyance, especially when she announces her plans to come over every day. They must work to put up with it without making Pop-Pop sad. Note: "White Hare" is based on Chris Savino's earlier idea for the show to have the Loud family be a big family of rabbits.
95	4	"City Slickers"	Kyle Marshall & Chris Savino	Kevin Sullivan	Jordan Rosato	February 9, 2018	305	1.51
95	4	"Fool Me Twice"	Kyle Marshall	Story by : Miguel Puga; Teleplay by : Sammie Crowley & Whitney Wetta	Miguel Puga	February 9, 2018	305	1.51
Lincoln and Lori head to Great Lakes City to visit Bobby, Ronnie Anne, and the Casagrande family. Lincoln discovers that Ronnie Anne has changed since the last time they interacted. She tries to cover up the fact that she has made friends with new kids and does not want them to know she originally came from Royal Woods. Meanwhile, Lori tries to prove that she is a city girl, which goes comically awry. April Fools' Day is tomorrow, and the Loud family works to find a way to keep Luan from pranking them. Inspired by a nearby filming of an action movie, the Loud family hires stunt doubles in order to fool Luan. The Loud family starts training their stunt doubles to act like them. Unfortunately, Luan takes advantage of their plot and uses the stunt doubles to humiliate them as part of her prank.
96	5	"Net Gains"	Kyle Marshall & Chris Savino	Joshua Hoskison	Darin McGowan	March 9, 2018	306A	1.38
Lynn Jr. is interested into winning a basketball championship. During the tryouts, she gets drafted to the worst basketball team called the Turkey Jerkies that is sponsored by Flip's Food & Fuel and consists of Paula Price (who has a broken leg), Diane (who has sweaty palms), Maya (who falls asleep at the wrong time), and Amy (whose Mom keeps calling to check up on her). Lynn works to help make the Turkey Jerkies be winners so that they can win a basketball championship.
97	6	"Pipe Dreams"	Kyle Marshall	Bob Mittenthal	Ari Castleton	March 16, 2018	306B	1.48
Having gotten tired of waiting in line to use the bathroom and not wanting to use Lana's bucket called Old Sloshie as an alternative offered to them by Lana, Lynn Sr. and Rita build their own secret bathroom in their closet. Due to the pets somehow getting in and doing different things, Lynn Sr. and Rita place different security measures on it which soon starts to go horribly wrong for them.
98	7	"Fandom Pains"	Kyle Marshall & Chris Savino	Karla Sakas Shropshire	Violaine Briat	March 30, 2018	307A	1.20
Lucy gets annoyed when Lori and Leni start watching the latest season of her favorite show "The Vampires of Melancholia" when a handsome actor the two girls like named Blake Bradley (Jack Griffo) joins the cast as Edwin's human great-great-great-great-grandnephew Tristan. With help from the Young Mortician's Club because of their dislike of Blake's character, Lucy plans to find a way to get Tristan removed from the show with help from the Morticians Club.
99	8	"Rita Her Rights"	Kyle Marshall & Chris Savino	Sammie Crowley & Whitney Wetta	Jordan Koch	April 6, 2018	307B	1.33
Rita has racked up a bunch of parking tickets from Officer Schoffner, who states that she can pay $2,000.00 or perform community service. As she finds it to be relaxing from the stressful life, she does various ways to get community service from Officer Schoffner, which causes chaos at home. Unfortunately, this causes Rita to get busted by Officer Schoffner for committing a crime spree and having to spend time in prison.
100	9	"Teachers' Union"	Kyle Marshall	Kevin Sullivan	Miguel Puga	April 13, 2018	308A	1.24
Lincoln and Clyde struggle to survive Coach Pacowski's gym class, like running a dangerous obstacle course. While seeing that Coach Pacowski still loves Mrs. Johnson, Lincoln and Clyde plan to hook them up, using advice from Lori on finding Coach Pacowski's strong points. But the strong points that they find out about Coach Pacowski do not all appear to be true.
101	10	"Head Poet's Anxiety"	Kyle Marshall & Chris Savino	Abi Wurdeman & Phil Wurdeman	Jordan Rosato	June 4, 2018	308B	1.38
After entertaining Pop-Pop and the elderly citizens of the Sunset Canyon Retirement Home, Luan finds that Lucy's latest poem has been rejected. So with that, Luan helps Lucy to be a better poet. When both of the girls land a gig at the Royal Woods Theater, Lucy worries that she might steal Luan's chance to be the youngest person to ever perform there.
102	11	"The Mad Scientist"	Kyle Marshall & Chris Savino	Jeff Sayers	Darin McGowan	June 5, 2018	309A	1.49
Due to her siblings disrupting her online talk on Albert Einstein's theory of time travel, Lisa is offered by a scientist named Dr. J, who offers her to work at the science institute so Lisa can get work done without interruptions. Lisa quickly accepts this, and it goes well at first, until she makes some discoveries on how things go at the science institute, and the fact that there are some basic things that she cannot do without her siblings.
103	12	"Deal Me Out"	Kyle Marshall	Sammie Crowley & Whitney Wetta	Riccardo Durante (Note: Misspelled as "Ricardo Durante" in the title card.)	June 6, 2018	310A	1.40
In light of the "Ace Savvy Convention", Lincoln and Clyde think that they are too old to pretend that they are Ace Savvy and One-Eyed Jack when their fellow students Trent and Lance had grown out of that phase. They work to find other hobbies to do, with comical results, because they also have a hard time giving up their past hobby.
104	13	"Friendzy"	Kyle Marshall & Chris Savino	Kevin Sullivan	Jordan Koch	June 7, 2018	310B	1.43
When the police arrive at the Loud house to deal with a noise complaint, Lincoln recaps the events to the viewers starting from a few days earlier. He learns from Rita that he can have extra privileges if he has a friend over by "playing the friend card" after seeing Lynn Jr. watching a baseball game with Margo. Lincoln takes advantage of that by having Clyde over. But his sisters soon find out about this and take advantage of that with their respective friends as well, causing Lynn Sr. and Rita to hide at the mall with Lily for a while.
105	14	"Tripped!"	Kyle Marshall & Chris Savino	Sammie Crowley, Whitney Wetta & Kevin Sullivan	Miguel Puga & Jordan Rosato	June 25, 2018	301	1.74
During a road trip to Weeping Willow Resort & Lodge on Lake Michigan after building up enough money in their money jug, the Loud family ends up in various predicaments along the way like Vanzilla breaking down and later accidentally ending up on a car carrier, an encounter with a prisoner (Matt Willig) when they accidentally get on a prison bus, and an open mic night event to raise money.
106	15	"Pasture Bedtime"	Kyle Marshall	John McKinnon & Kyle Marshall	Miguel Puga	June 26, 2018	311	1.34
106	15	"Shop Girl"	Kyle Marshall & Chris Savino	Sheela Shrinivas	Jordan Rosato	June 26, 2018	311	1.34
Liam is having a farmhouse slumber party at Hunnicut farm while Girl Jordan is having an awesome pool party on the same night. Lincoln, Clyde, Rusty, and Zach must find a way to balance both appearances without hurting Liam's feelings. Leni's siblings think that she is too weak when the shoppers at Reininger's big sale are too aggressive and beat her at every sale. To prepare Leni for the sale tomorrow, Lincoln and the rest of his sisters work to make Leni aggressive.
107	16	"What Wood Lincoln Do?"	Kyle Marshall & Chris Savino	Bob Mittenthal	Jordan Koch	June 27, 2018	313B	1.30
Lincoln has to do a woodworking project for Mrs. Johnson, but he has a bad habit of going through the side-effects of having to build something. After he receives help from Rita for building a step stool, Lincoln has a hard time putting together other wood works including building a dresser for Mrs. Johnson when her mother comes to visit.
108	17	"Ruthless People"	Kyle Marshall & Chris Savino	Sammie Crowley & Whitney Wetta	Sarah Johnson	June 28, 2018	313A	1.22
A termite infestation has forced the Loud family out of their house. While the house is being fumigated, one half of the family bunks with Pop-Pop at Sunset Canyon Retirement Home while the other half bunks with Rita's Aunt Ruth at her house. Lincoln is part of the group that is chosen to stay with Ruth as those with him want to trade places with the other.
109	18	"Scales of Justice"	Kyle Marshall	Jeff Sayers	Miguel Puga	July 20, 2018	314	1.20
109	18	"Crimes of Fashion"	Kyle Marshall	Karla Sakas Shropshire	Jordan Rosato	July 20, 2018	314	1.20
When the construction of a new Mustard Warehouse threatens Fishman's Pond at Tall Timbers Park when the Fishmans' new eggs have been laid, Lana works to defend the habitat from the construction crew without having to get 10,000 signatures for a petition. Unfortunately, Lana takes a shortcut and does a swamp monster plot with Hops and the local animals that soon gets covered in the news by local news reporter Katherine Mulligan. Ms. Carmichael fires Leni from her job at Reininger's when several scarves have gone missing. Taking on the identities of Ace Savvy and One-Eyed Jack, Lincoln and Clyde plan to find the real culprit behind the theft, where their antics begin to annoy Ms. Carmichael and store employee Fiona. But surprisingly, Lincoln and Clyde discover that the culprit behind the thefts is someone that they and Ms. Carmichael least suspect.
110	19	"Breaking Dad"	Kyle Marshall	Kevin Sullivan	Ari Castleton	July 30, 2018	312B	1.47
Lynn Sr. enlists Mr. Grouse to watch over Lily while he and Kotaro go to Cowbella (a music festival dedicated to cowbell music) when the daycare center is closed and Rita is busy at the dentist's office. Although Lily keeps doing something that causes Mr. Grouse to call Lynn Sr. for advice, Lily suddenly starts to see Mr. Grouse as a better father than Lynn Sr. for some reason, prompting the latter to try to prove that he is her real father.
111	20	"Absent Minded"	Kyle Marshall	Kevin Sullivan	Darin McGowan	July 31, 2018	315A	1.82
When Clyde finds out that he missed a day of school, he quickly and nervously jumps to conclusions and fears that he's a fraud after winning a perfect attendance plaque. When Clyde tries to inform Principal Huggins about this mistake, he is offered the position of junior administrator. When he is tasked on digitizing the school records, Clyde enlists Lincoln into reclaiming Clyde's attendance records without the janitor Norm, Coach Pacowski, and Nurse Patti overhearing them.
112	21	"Gown and Out"	Kyle Marshall & Chris Savino	Karla Sakas Shropshire	Darin McGowan	August 1, 2018	312A	1.64
Lola advances to the regional Little Miss Southeastern Michigan pageant at the Caribou Inn after winning the Little Miss Royal Woods Pageant that was hosted by Cheryl. As Lori covers for Lynn Sr. and Rita into being Lola's chaperone due to both of them being unavailable, Lola worries about losing when she meets other contestants like Chinah, Claudette, and Jackie who are better at everything than her.
113	22	"Be Stella My Heart"	Amanda Rynda	Sammie Crowley & Whitney Wetta	Ari Castleton	August 2, 2018	315B	1.53
In a follow-up to "White Hare", the new girl Stella wants to hang out with Lincoln, Clyde, Liam, Rusty, and Zach. They soon suspect that she likes one of them. After Lincoln spends time with Stella at the Burpin' Burger, Stella starts to hang out with each one of the boys as they compete for her attention to see which of them she likes.
114	23	"House of Lies"	Darin McGowan	Sammie Crowley & Whitney Wetta	Darin McGowan	September 17, 2018	318	1.21
114	23	"Game Boys"	Kyle Marshall	Jeff Sayers	Ari Castleton	September 17, 2018	318	1.21
Lisa has noticed a bunch of lies told by her fellow family members. She invents a pair of Lie-Detecting Glasses to correct their compulsive lying. However, after the Lie-Detecting Glasses are destroyed by her family members after they got annoyed with it, Lisa creates Lie-Detecting Cameras with force fields that work too well. Clyde has a new gaming system called a Super-Snap 95. When Lincoln wants to borrow it, Clyde has a hard time trusting Lincoln with it as he fears that it would be destroyed by Lincoln's sisters. In order to keep the Super-Snap 95 safe, Clyde lingers at the Loud House to make sure nothing bad happens to it during the McBride family's Screen-Free Sunday.
115	24	"Sitting Bull"	Kyle Marshall	Michael Rubiner	Sarah Johnson	September 18, 2018	316A	1.29
Lynn Jr. gets involved with Lori, Leni, Luna, and Luan's babysitting club, but they do not think Lynn is the nurturing type. Lynn's first gig is with the McCauley family, where she watches Caleb and Camille, but in a non-nurturing way as expected. After Lynn's antics cause Lori, Leni, Luna, and Luan to lose their clients, they decide to trick Lynn into babysitting the Fox Quintuplets who are their worst clients so that Lynn would quit. They soon jump to conclusions and worry that they may have made a mistake.
116	25	"The Spies Who Loved Me"	Kyle Marshall	Sheela Shrinivas	Jordan Koch	September 19, 2018	316B	1.18
Ronnie Anne is planning to go downtown to check out the street murals. This causes Rosa and Hector to worry about her as they think downtown is too dangerous. Carlota and Carl spy on behalf of the rest of the Casagrandes. When the tracker that is in Ronnie Anne's backpack falls onto a rat, most of the Casagrandes head out to find Ronnie Anne, thinking that she is heading to a dangerous area, while CJ watches Carlitos and Bobby. Back in Royal Woods, Lincoln is in line awaiting the brand new flippee flavor. Though Flip has trouble fixing the Flippee Machine.
117	26	"Missed Connection"	Kyle Marshall & Chris Savino	Karla Sakas Shropshire	Ari Castleton	September 20, 2018	309B	1.23
When Lori and Bobby attempt to have their daily conversation, a few misunderstandings lead to them having a rather awkward conversation. Because of this, the two fear that dating long distance is not working out for them. With encouragement from their respective parents, Lori and Bobby attempt to show each other that they care for each other through various means like signs of affection, a home video, and virtual dating. When that ends up not working, the two decide to spend their day together, which is, somehow, just as troublesome as when they were separate.
118	27	"Everybody Loves Leni"	Kyle Marshall	Sheela Shrinivas	Sarah Johnson	October 9, 2018	319A	1.15
While hanging out at the mall with her work friends Fiona and Miguel, Leni sees her school friends Jackie and Mandee shopping and plans to spend time with them. However, it also happens to be the day of Fiona's date tonight with a food court employee and Leni will not be able to be her wing man. Leni tries to balance between the two groups to make them happy, but when she is caught, her friends decide to call it a night. With advice from Lori and Lincoln, Leni tries to make both halves get along with a party, but the results are not what she's expecting.
119	28	"Middle Men"	Kyle Marshall	Karla Sakas Shropshire	Jordan Koch	October 10, 2018	319B	1.08
Lynn Jr. learns that Lincoln and Clyde are going to be attending an orientation at Royal Woods Middle School. After calling up Principal Ramirez to see who is overseeing the chaperone program, Lynn takes the opportunity to give them a tour around Royal Woods Middle School to help them get an understanding on what middle school life is like. However, some of Lynn's advice to the boys lead to antics that cause some students to want to see them on the blacktop at 3:00.
120	29	"Jeers for Fears"	Kyle Marshall	Kevin Sullivan	Miguel Puga & Diem Doan	October 11, 2018	320A	1.15
When the Royal Woods House of Terror opens, Lincoln and Clyde have to toughen up in order to face their fears and prove that they are not cowards to Chandler, Trent, and Richie. To pull this off, Lincoln enlists his sisters to do various things to scare him and Clyde and Lucy comes up with various scares to toughen them up.
121	30	"Tea Tale Heart"	Kyle Marshall	Sammie Crowley	Jordan Rosato	October 12, 2018	320B	1.14
Lola discovers that Lucy has a fragile doll that was found in one of Great-Grandma Harriet's trunks in the attic and Lola wants to have tea with it. However, Lucy does not want Lola to have the doll, fearing it might break in her and Lana's room. Lola secretly borrows it while Lucy is away at a poetry convention. When she accidentally gets tea on the doll and breaks it, Lola finds a replacement doll at the antique store, but when she tries to get rid of the previous antique doll, it mysteriously keeps coming back to her.
122	31	"The Loudest Thanksgiving"	Kyle Marshall	Jeff Sayers & Sheela Shrinivas	Ari Castleton & Darin McGowan	November 12, 2018	321	1.47
On Thanksgiving, Flip tells the viewers the story of how Lori and Bobby did not want to be apart during Thanksgiving. After overhearing Lori and Bobby, Lincoln and Hector lead their families into keeping Lori and Bobby in their home. After Lori and Bobby figure it out and talk with their families, they come up with a plan to have the Loud family and the Casagrande family dine together in Royal Woods. This causes both the Loud and Casagrande families to compete to see who will pull off the better Thanksgiving for their firstborn children.
123	32	"Really Loud Music"	Kyle Marshall	Karla Sakas Shropshire & Kevin Sullivan	Miguel Puga & Jordan Rosato	November 23, 2018	317	1.25
In this musical episode, a show called America's Next Hitmaker is holding a song contest for anyone who can come up with a song that the whole world will love. Luna plans to make an original song for the contest while hearing songs that did not actually come from her family members and Clyde. When a song she did in the bubblegum pop category manages to make the top 5, the judges Michelle (Rachel Butera) and Doug (Doug Rockwell) want to make some changes to Luna. These changes cause Luna to make an important decision when the time comes for her to perform.
124	33	"Predict Ability"	Kyle Marshall	Karla Sakas Shropshire	Sarah Johnson	February 4, 2019	322A	1.03
Lincoln discovers that he does the same routine every day, like going to the bathroom at the same time, how he likes his breakfast burrito, wearing the same outfit, partnering up with Clyde, and persuading Coach Pacowski into not letting him climb the rope. Thinking makes him boring, Lincoln becomes a fear of being predictable and decides to change his routine every day, much to the concern of Clyde and the surprise of everyone else.
125	34	"Driving Ambition"	Kyle Marshall	Bob Mittenthal	Jordan Koch	February 5, 2019	322B	1.18
When Coach Hutch (Jane Lynch), Royal Woods High School's golf coach, tells Lori that she invited Coach Niblick of Fairway University to see Lori play, Lori is surprised at this announcement, since Fairway University is her dream college. Wanting to prove her worth, Lori tries to hone her skills before the big tournament, but she ends up catching the yips, a movement disorder known to interfere with putting. Now Lori fears that her future is in jeopardy because of this setback, so her siblings attempt to help her in any way they can before the tournament.
126	35	"Home of the Fave"	Kyle Marshall & Miguel Puga	Whitney Wetta	Miguel Puga & Diem Doan	February 6, 2019	323A	1.26
When heading to Super Mart, Lynn Sr. takes Luan (who needs to restock on eggs and bananas for a prank) and Lola (who needs more macaroni for her necklace after Lily ate it all). After the trip, Lynn Sr. thinks that Lola suspects him of playing favorites after he did various puns with Luan, while also recapping how his own dad had played favorites when he was young. This causes Lynn Sr. to try not to play favorites with any of his kids with comical results.
127	36	"Hero Today, Gone Tomorrow"	Kyle Marshall	Sheela Shrinivas	Jordan Rosato	February 7, 2019	323B	1.22
During the Royal Woods Kangaroos' soccer game against the Beaverton Bees, Margo takes the winning shot when Lynn Jr. is quadruple-teamed. This results in Margo's winning kick being favored by Lynn's teammates, her classmates, her teachers Coach Keck and Mr. Bolhofner, Librarian Wetta, the Burpin' Burger patrons and even Lincoln. Now Lynn starts feeling jealous of Margo, much to Paula's concern, and soon, everything that happens next may affect Lynn's game and her friendship with Margo.
128	37	"Cooked!"	Kyle Marshall	Sammie Crowley & Whitney Wetta	Diem Doan & Jordan Rosato	February 18, 2019	326	1.16
Lynn Sr. has finally opened his very own restaurant called "Lynn's Table" and his children work to promote it. After the children are unable to agree on a promotion for the restaurant, Lincoln gets his commercial idea on the air, with help from Clyde and his dads' connection with Patchy Drizzle. When customers start coming in, most of Lincoln's sisters start doing their own promotions which start to overwhelm Lynn Sr. Now Lincoln and his sisters must work together to have the restaurant's grand opening go off without a hitch, even when Lucy books Lynn Sr. an interview with Katherine Mulligan.
129	38	"The Write Stuff"	Kyle Marshall	Karla Sakas Shropshire	Darin McGowan	March 4, 2019	324A	1.20
Rita learns that the Royal Woods Elementary School's writing club that Lucy attends is overseen by Principal Huggins, who prefers to run it by the book. Meanwhile, Superintendent Chen has marked Huggins' performance as Royal Woods Elementary School's principal as "mediocre". After some persuasion, Rita is given the opportunity to run the writing club and proceeds to go against the book by taking Lucy and the other members, Haiku, Sasha and Amir, to different places to expand their craft. However, she gets into a conflict with Huggins when he refuses to let the club perform at a poetry café called the Burnt Bean.
130	39	"Racing Hearts"	Kyle Marshall	Kevin Sullivan	Ari Castleton	March 5, 2019	324B	1.29
Luna and her girlfriend Sam spend their first date as partners during the Royal Woods Astonishing Quest hosted by Mayor Theresa Davis. The contestants must go to various locations to complete different challenges, where the first one to complete all the quests will win a tiny trophy. As they play, Luna discovers that she and Sam do not have much in common as they are not good at certain things.
131	40	"Stage Plight"	Amanda Rynda	Kevin Sullivan	Sarah Johnson	March 6, 2019	325A	1.15
In order to get to know her crush Benny, Luan joins the drama production of Romeo & Juliet hosted by drama teacher Mrs. Bernardo. To get to be with Benny, Luan does some switches in roles with some of her classmates. Luan gets nervous when she has to kiss Benny because she has never been kissed before.
132	41	"Antiqued Off"	Kyle Marshall	Jeff Sayers	Jordan Koch	March 7, 2019	325B	1.22
Clyde gets tickets to the Fern Valley Flea Market with Lincoln, who is reluctant to go along, though Clyde gets Zach to come along with him and they take an interest in antiques. This causes Lincoln to get jealous of their new antique hobby and friendship. On the Amazing Brailster's magic show, Lincoln finds that Liam, Rusty, and Stella have been lying to get out of going to the Amazing Brailster and the truth about what happened with Clyde at the last Amazing Brailster show.

=== Season 4 (2019–20) ===
No. overall	No. in season	Title	Directed by	Written by	Storyboard by	Original release date	Prod. code	U.S. viewers (millions)
133	1	"Friended! with the Casagrandes"	Kyle Marshall	Karla Sakas Shropshire & Kevin Sullivan	Ari Castleton & Darin McGowan	May 27, 2019	401	0.92
Ronnie Anne befriends a new girl named Sid Chang who is into the things that Ronnie Anne does. When her family checks out an apartment in the Casagrandes' building that is available, Ronnie Anne plans to reserve that apartment for the Chang family. To throw off the suspicion of Rosa (who works as the building manager) and the building's landlord Mr. Scully, Ronnie Anne enlists the help of Bobby, their cousins, Lalo, and Sergio to keep away the other candidates for the apartment.
134	2	"Power Play with the Casagrandes"	Kyle Marshall	Rosemary Contreras	Sarah Johnson	June 10, 2019	402A	0.72
Hector and Rosa are looking forward to their anniversary trip, but unfortunately, the electric bill and water bill are so high, that they will not be able to afford it. Ronnie Anne leads Bobby and Maria to cut back on energy usage, but despite all that, the energy use is still going up as the rest of the family is led into cutting back as well. Eventually, Ronnie Anne discovers an unlikely source as to who has been using up so much energy.
135	3	"Room for Improvement with the Casagrandes"	Kyle Marshall	Sammie Crowley	Jordan Koch	June 11, 2019	402B	0.68
While trying to do a dance from a song done by the K-pop group Twelve is Midnight, Ronnie Anne and Sid keep getting interrupted by members of their family. As the other spots of the apartment are occupied by the other tenants like Alexis, Miranda, Mrs. Kernicky, Mr. Nakamura and his dog Nelson, Cory, and Georgia, Ronnie Anne and Sid head to the laundry room, where they find an abandoned room. After secretly getting some stuff down their, the two of them plan to use it as their secret hangout to keep the other tenants from knowing. Though Ronnie Anne and Sid come to regret their decision when the other tenants plan to give up their spots to them.
136	4	"Roll Model with the Casagrandes"	Kyle Marshall	Lance Whinery	Diem Doan	June 12, 2019	403A	0.73
When Ronnie Anne and Carl are hanging out the park, Carl witnesses Ronnie Anne save Nelson from a squirrel attack. As a result, Carl begins to copy every little bit of Ronnie Anne's actions, calling her a hero like his favorite superhero El Falcón de Fuego, much to her annoyance. While trying to figure out a way to get Carl off her back, Ronnie Anne soon makes a discovery from Bobby and her father Dr. Santiago (who is operating in Peru as part of his Physicians on Missions assignment) that might make everything she's been through come full circle.
137	5	"No Show with the Casagrandes"	Miguel Puga	Linda Yvette Chavez	Jordan Rosato	June 13, 2019	403B	0.74
The Casagrande family is eager to watch their favorite telenovela Adios, Ana, Adios, but Ronnie Anne refuses to watch with them, calling telenovelas campy. However, when Ronnie Anne sees a clip of the main character (who bears a strong resemblance to Ronnie Anne herself) kicking bandit butt from the TV across the street, she becomes obsessed with the show. Out of fear to admitting to her family of liking the show after making such a big deal about not liking it, Ronnie Anne, Sergio, and Lalo go around town in attempt to keep up with the show with Ronnie Anne trying to keep it a secret from her family.
138	6	"Face the Music with the Casagrandes"	Miguel Puga	Lalo Alcaraz	Ari Castleton	June 17, 2019	404A	0.71
Ronnie Anne learns from her family that it is tradition for all the family members to do a performance for Hector when his birthday comes. However, Ronnie Anne has intense stage fright after falling over during a first-grade play where she portrayed a tree. Sid attempts to help in any way she could, but no matter how hard she tries, Ronnie Anne still cannot get over her stage fright. When the time for the party comes, Ronnie Anne soon learns something about Hector that might help her out.
139	7	"Pranks for the Memories with the Casagrandes"	Kyle Marshall	Whitney Wetta	Darin McGowan	June 18, 2019	404B	0.76
The adult members are going to an adult-only Japanese restaurant and Carlota is left to watch over her siblings while Bobby runs the bodega. To better relate to Carlota, Ronnie Anne takes Sid's advice to bond with her. The two of them bond over pranks when CJ, Carl, and Carlitos start a prank war. Bobby gets involved with the boys when they start countering the girls' pranks. When Ronnie Anne and Carlota find out, they work to stay one step ahead of them.
140	8	"Store Wars with the Casagrandes"	Kyle Marshall	Sheela Shrinivas	Sarah Johnson	June 19, 2019	405A	0.75
A brand new supermarket named Hi 'N' Buy opens across the street and Bobby fears that this new store will overthrow the competition and will result in the mercado shutting down like what happened with the other places that he worked at. In an attempt to keep business running, Bobby rallies his family into making several improvements in the mercado which turns out well. However, things quickly fall apart during the 24-hour promotion when the family starts to lose traction due to a lack of sleep.
141	9	"Lucha Fever with the Casagrandes"	Miguel Puga	Katie Mattila	Jordan Koch	June 20, 2019	405B	0.78
Ronnie Anne is excited to watch a wrestling championship featuring her favorite wrestler La Tormenta. However, it also happens to be on the same day Carlos is attending an awards ceremony and needs everyone's support, except for Maria, due to having to work the late shift at the hospital. Not wanting to miss the championship, Ronnie Anne pretends to be sick so she can stay home. However, due to Rosa's ever growing anxieties, she has the other tenants and family friends check up on her. When Ronnie Anne manages to drive them away with Sid's help, Rosa comes back to cure her herself, much to Ronnie Anne's annoyance.
142	10	"Washed Up"	Kyle Marshall	Karla Sakas Shropshire	Diem Doan	July 15, 2019	406A	0.84
On a rare Saturday where everyone is free for the day, the Loud family decides to spend their day by taking a boat trip around Lake Eddy during fishing season. After renting their boat from Flip, the family soon encounters several problems from the engine dying to the lack of oars since they are painted on. To make matters worse, the family gets caught in a whirlpool which destroys their boat and strands them on a deserted island with its own microclimate. With their mode of transportation destroyed, the Louds must make the most of what they can salvage while they wait for the coast guard to come and rescue them.
143	11	"Recipe for Disaster"	Kyle Marshall	Kevin Sullivan	Jordan Rosato	July 16, 2019	406B	0.82
Clyde shows up at the Loud House and shows Lincoln the frozen foods his dads bought which taste similar to Lynn Sr.'s dishes. After getting confirmation about it from Lisa and her chemical analyzing invention that compares the two dishes, Lincoln and Clyde visit Lynn Sr. at Lynn's Table as Ace Savvy and One-Eyed Jack, where he states that he keeps his recipes in a cookbook that he made. When it turns out missing, Lincoln and Clyde begin to look for suspects. After Kotaro and Grant's alibis are confirmed, Lincoln and Clyde go to the Frosty Farms Frozen Foods headquarters to find the culprit.
144	12	"Present Tense"	Darin McGowan	Sammie Crowley	Darin McGowan	July 17, 2019	407A	0.90
Today is Lynn Sr.'s birthday and the kids are hard at work on creating a scrapbook filled with all of their precious memories. However, Lori learns that Carol Pingrey gave her father a statue of his head made out of Belgian chocolate for his birthday causing the kids to question if the scrapbook is a good enough present. This prompts them to go to the Royal Woods Mall to find a gift. As they look, they end up disagreeing with most of the choices they make, leading to a frantic search around the Royal Woods Mall and Flip's Food & Fuel for the perfect present.
145	13	"Any Given Sundae"	Kyle Marshall	Sheela Shrinivas	Ari Castleton	July 18, 2019	407B	0.93
Lily overhears Lynn Sr. and Rita talk about taking the kids out for ice cream at Auntie Pam's Ice Cream Parlor if they are good. Seeing this as an opportunity to try her first ice cream, Lily tries to let the kids know about it only for them not to understand her and to misinterpret her. Now Lily must work to keep the kids from causing trouble before Rita gets home and get the family to Auntie Pam's Ice Cream Parlor before it closes early at 5:00 to give their scoopers time to rest.
146	14	"A Grave Mistake"	Darin McGowan	Whitney Wetta	Darin McGowan	September 2, 2019	410	0.93
146	14	"Leader of the Rack"	Jessica Borutski	Byron Dockins	Ari Castleton	September 2, 2019	410	0.93
The Morticians Club loses its leader Bertrand when his father gets a job as a lifeguard at the S.S. Funtime Party Cruise. With Haiku chosen as his successor, Lucy persuades Bertrand to let her be the president at Lincoln's suggestion. As Bertrand is left with deciding vote, Lucy persuades Lincoln to join the club in order to break the tie. Things start to go awry for Lucy when the Morticians Club members quit and the funeral for the school mascot Ricky the Rooster spirals out of control. Ms. Carmichael goes to represent the district in a sock-folding competition and she makes Leni the temporary manager of Reininger's. With advice from Lori, Leni plans to make the employment fun for Fiona and Miguel since they secretly consider Ms. Carmichael a zero-fun "drillster" (Miguel's invented word for drill sergeant). When Leni allows Fiona and Miguel to go on a long lunch at the new Chinese restaurant Dim Yum, she must hold down the store when a Senior Shop-aganza that Pop-Pop and Myrtle are taking part in.
147	15	"Kings of the Con"	Kyle Marshall	Sammie Crowley & Whitney Wetta	Ari Castleton, Darin McGowan & Jules Bridgers	October 14, 2019	413	0.68
Clyde informs Lincoln about the news where the Ace Savvy convention arrives at Royal Woods with a "Kings of the Con" contest, where whoever has the best authentic costume will appear in the upcoming Ace Savvy movie. At Clyde's suggestion, Lincoln persuades his sisters to come to the convention as the Full Deck. On the day of the convention, the Full Deck starts gaining more attention, where they impressed the two judges who are annoyed with Lincoln and Clyde's antics. This causes Lincoln and Clyde to compete against the Full Deck for the spot in the movie which goes awry when the Kitty gets loose.
148	16	"Tails of Woe"	Jessica Borutski	Karla Sakas Shropshire	Sarah Johnson	October 19, 2019	411	1.03
148	16	"Last Loud on Earth"	Kyle Marshall	Kevin Sullivan	Jordan Koch	October 19, 2019	411	1.03
On Friday Share, Stella has a music box that she and her grandmother had found. When it goes missing, Lincoln, Clyde, Liam, Rusty, and Zach work to find it while investigating the school legend of the Rat Beast which takes items. After run-ins with Coach Pacowski, Norm, and Cheryl, their investigation leads them to the school basement. Lincoln and Clyde have been watching "Swarm of the Zombies" marathon. To continue watching the movie, they watch the marathon in Lisa's bunker. After the marathon is over, Lincoln and Clyde sneak back into the house and find the house empty with no service or no power. With abandoned streets and empty houses all over the neighborhood, Lincoln and Clyde work to defend themselves from a presumed zombie apocalypse until a broadcast from Mayor Davis mentions that the people are at the Royal Woods Mall due to the storm warning.
149	17	"Can't Hardly Wait"	Kyle Marshall & Jessica Borutski	Whitney Wetta	Sarah Johnson	October 26, 2019	408	1.03
149	17	"A Mutt Above"	Kyle Marshall	Karla Sakas Shropshire	Jordan Koch	October 26, 2019	408	1.03
Fairway University has sent Lori a catalogue in the mail. In order to have the most hang time when Lori's time there occurs, Lynn Sr. brings Lori to work as a waitress as she shadows Kotaro. Lori tries to do every job at Lynn's Table which goes comically awry. Charles is insulted by Lana's classmate Lacey St. Clair by stating that her dog Victoire is from a line of champions. In order to beat Victoire at the Royal Woods Annual Dog Show, Lana starts to train Charles which goes wrong at every turn. Lola gets involved in helping Lana prepare Charles for the Royal Woods Annual Dog Show.
150	18	"Love Birds"	Kyle Marshall	Kevin Sullivan	Diem Doan	November 2, 2019	409	1.14
150	18	"Rocket Men"	Jessica Borutski	Sammie Crowley	Jordan Rosato	November 2, 2019	409	1.14
Walt has fallen in love with a plastic flamingo on Mr. Grouse's lawn which goes wrong after he accidentally cracks it. After seeing a recap of "The Dream Boat," Charles, Cliff, and Geo plan to find the right bird love interest for Walt. Lincoln and Clyde persuade their parents to let them attend the Space Cadets Experience where Tarreyn Van Skyle is a camp counselor. They soon find that it is not as fun as they think. When their parents tell them to give it a chance, Lincoln and Clyde work to get out before they face the flight simulator. Note: When it first aired, the positions of "Love Birds" and "Rocket Men" were switched.
151	19	"Stall Monitor"	Jessica Borutski	Andrew Brooks	Jared Morgan	November 9, 2019	412	1.01
151	19	"A Pimple Plan"	Jessica Borutski	Katie Mattila	Jordan Rosato	November 9, 2019	412	1.01
Parent-teacher conferences are tonight and Mrs. Johnson is looking forward to speaking to Lincoln's parents. Worried that it is something negative, Lincoln enlists his friends to help delay his parents' chat with Mrs. Johnson. Rusty, Zach, Clyde, Liam, and Stella manipulate their parents into stalling Mrs. Johnson so she would not have to talk to Lynn Sr. and Rita. Luan is preparing for her first date with Benny when she finds a pimple on her face. In order to get rid of it, Luan enlists her siblings to get rid of it. Lori, Lisa, Lynn, Lucy, and Lincoln to try their attempts, but they all fail. Leni's enlists Miguel's to cover it up, but that plan also does not last well.
152	20	"Good Sports"	Jessica Borutski	Kevin Sullivan	Sarah Johnson	November 16, 2019	414	0.90
152	20	"Geriantics"	Jessica Borutski	Sammie Crowley	Jared Morgan	November 16, 2019	414	0.90
Lynn watches a football championship match where the Lions are facing off against the Rhinos. She discovers that Mr. Grouse is also a fan of the Lions. Despite their respective bad habits, they bond over the Lions' victories. However, their bondage is on the line during baseball season when the two discover that they root for opposing baseball teams. Lisa hears from Pop-Pop that he will not be around in 73 years and attempts to extend Pop-Pop's lifespan. She starts with a brisk walk around the Royal Woods Mall, having Sunset Canyon's chef make him fish, and having Pop-Pop take a frozen swim. In order to keep an eye on him, Lisa disguises herself as an elderly and creates a special suit to help him out.
153	21	"Exchange of Heart"	Kyle Marshall	Whitney Wetta	Jordan Koch	January 25, 2020	415	1.01
153	21	"Community Disservice"	Jessica Borutski & Jordan Rosato	Karla Sakas Shropshire	Jordan Rosato	January 25, 2020	415	1.01
With Howard and Harold still forbidding Clyde to do things like watch "Crow-Mageddon" or a video game all-nighter with Lincoln, he takes Lincoln's advice to have his dads host a Brazilian exchange student named Tiago. Clyde has his dads give Tiago some time outside of the house so that he, Cleopawtra, and Nepurrtiti can have the house to themselves. In order to gain an entry in the Little Miss Sunbeam pageant, Lola must do community service. She takes an offer by Cheryl to be a student buddy to a shy new student named Meli Ramos. Lola teaches Meli on how to get everyone in her class to like her. On the day of the Little Miss Sunshine pageant, Lola worries about Meli at Dairyland causing her to have Lana check on her.
154	22	"Deep Cuts"	Darin McGowan	Katie Mattila	Darin McGowan	February 1, 2020	416	0.67
154	22	"Game Off"	Kyle Marshall	Sammie Crowley	Jules Bridgers	February 1, 2020	416	0.67
At Royal Woods High School, Luna learns from a note from Principal Rivers that music club has been cancelled due to budget cuts. With the assistance of Sam, Mazzy, and Sully, Luna starts a protest. While Rivers supports them, she starts to cut the other clubs much to the dismay of Lori and Luan as her assistant Oliver wants one of the clubs cut by Monday. Now they must work together to keep all the clubs from getting shut down. Lincoln has gotten a garbage-themed video game called "Total Trash Takedown" where the player must defeat the Trash King. When Lana wants to play, Lincoln does not want to lend it to her until he finishes his level. Not wanting to wait following a nightmare, Lana plans to play the game and accidentally loses Lincoln's last life. Lana enlists the rest of her sisters to help him get through the video game and keep Lincoln distracted until Lana can get back to the Trash Castle and defeat the Trash King.
155	23	"Singled Out"	Kyle Marshall	Karla Sakas Shropshire	Jared Morgan	February 15, 2020	418	0.53
155	23	"Brave the Last Dance"	Jessica Borutski	Katie Mattila	Jordan Rosato	February 15, 2020	418	0.53
Lynn learns that her roller derby teammates Margo, Lainey, Maddie, and Nadia have their own dates. Not wanting to be the only one without a boyfriend, Lynn plans to obtain a boyfriend of her own. The only one who passed her challenges is a boy named Dexter as she tries to be a good girlfriend to him. Clyde has developed a crush on a student named Emma while working on the planning committee for the Valentine's Day shindig at Royal Woods Elementary School. Worried that Emma does not like him, Clyde enlists Lincoln, Liam, Rusty, Zach, and Stella to find out if she likes Clyde. After each result is positive, Clyde learns that Emma wants to be friends causing him not to attend.
156	24	"Write and Wrong"	Jessica Borutski	Kevin Sullivan	Sarah Johnson	April 27, 2020	417A	0.53
After finally finishing her book, Rita reveals to Lynn Sr. that the Royal Woods Gazette is looking for someone to handle the parenting advice column. The editor-in-chief Jesse Hiller responds to her resume and will give her the position if her 11 kids are perfect. This causes Rita to have her kids not be a nuisance in certain areas so that she can maintain the position.
157	25	"Purrfect Gig"	Jessica Borutski	Byron Dockins	Jordan Koch	April 29, 2020	417B	0.53
In order to get $50.00 for a VIP ticket at Mick Swagger's latest concert, Luna takes Clyde's offer to watch over Cleopawtra and Nepurrtiti while he and his dads are at a McBride family reunion as well as the fact that their usual pet-sitter cancelled at the last minute. Luna struggles to follow the manual on how to handle Cleopawtra and Nepurrtiti. After some difficulty, she enlists Sam for help as she brings her younger brother Simon along.
158	26	"Sister Act"	Darin McGowan & Kyle Marshall	Kevin Sullivan	Darin McGowan & Ari Castleton	May 11, 2020	419A	0.50
In preparing for an upcoming pageant and the recycling challenge of Auntie Pam's Ice Cream Parlor respectively, Lola and Lana get the idea to pose as each other to get out of doing the things that they do not want to do. Though this charade lasts up to the point where Lola has a doctor's appointment with Dr. Peterson and Lana has a dentist's appointment with Dr. Feinstein which affects their participation in their respective events.
159	27	"House Flip"	Kyle Marshall	Kyle Marshall & John McKinnon	Jules Bridgers	May 12, 2020	419B	0.49
When Lori accidentally backs Vanzilla up into some trash cans due to the antics of her siblings, Lynn Sr. and Rita scold Lori for losing focus and warn the kids that their driving privileges of Vanzilla will be suspended indefinitely if another dent appears in it. A car radio antic from her siblings in Vanzilla causes Lori to back Vanzilla into Flip's Food & Fuel enough for the roof to fall and injure Flip. To make it up to him, the kids allow Flip to recuperate at their house while trying to keep their parents from finding out about the incident.
160	28	"Don't You Fore-get About Me"	Jessica Borutski	Sammie Crowley	Sarah Johnson	May 13, 2020	420A	0.50
The Loud family gets a tour of Fairway University where Lori will be moving away to attend. Not wanting Lori be distant from her and misinterpreting Lily's advice, Leni works to prevent her from getting a scholarship by doing things like looking bad in front of Coach Niblick. Meanwhile, Lincoln runs into Ronnie Anne at the time when Carlos is giving a lecture in one of the buildings as he films some of Ronnie Anne's skateboarding movies.
161	29	"Tough Cookies"	Jessica Borutski	Karla Sakas Shropshire	Jordan Koch	May 14, 2020	420B	0.54
Impressed by the plate of oatmeal and butterscotch cookies that Clyde brought Lincoln while trying one, Principal Huggins asks them if they can make another plate of cookies for the school board meeting as Superintendent Chen has a sweet tooth. After Superintendent Chen likes the cookies, Lincoln and Clyde start a cookie-making project and deliver them to different places. As Lisa noted that it would take them five hours to bake cookies, they rope in Liam, Rusty, Zach, and Stella into helping them at the time when the kids have a history project to do.
162	30	"A Dark and Story Night"	Jessica Borutski & Kyle Marshall	Sammie Crowley	Jared Morgan	May 16, 2020	424A	0.68
One winter night, a tree knocks down a powerline on Oak Street. To find another way to keep themselves entertained while their parents away, the Loud children start a story where one person starts off and the others must add on. The story stars a cowboy named Triton (portrayed by Lincoln) who lands on a planet to recharge his ship, where he meets Princess DeLola (portrayed by Lola) and Ribbon the Frog (portrayed by Lana). This leads to a quest to find the power crystals while running into different characters like a Rock Goddess (portrayed by Luna), a robot (portrayed by Lisa), an alien basketball player (portrayed by Lynn), the ghost of a basketball player (portrayed by Lucy), and a mermaid (portrayed by Lori) along the way.
163	31	"Feast or Family"	Kyle Marshall & Jordan Koch	Jeff Sayers	Jordan Koch	May 16, 2020	423B	0.68
Lynn Sr. discovers that Luan has taken Intro to Cooking as an elective due to her first two choices being taken. To prepare Luan for Intro to Cooking, Lynn Sr. shows his passion of cooking with her. Once that elective is over, Lynn Sr. plans to have Luan carry on the legacy by having her take over Lynn's Table. It soon reaches the point where Lynn Sr. is taking the fun out of cooking and annoying Luan with it.
164	32	"On Thin Ice"	Kyle Marshall	Jeff Sayers	Jared Morgan	June 8, 2020	421A	0.55
Lynn's hockey tickets have come in and three of the family members will have to accompany her to make sure the Royal Woods Jellyfish led by Rowdy McQuads (Kyle Clifford) win against the New Jersey Gaba-Ghouls. Lynn Sr. brings Luan and Lincoln to the game in exchange for getting them funnel cake and foam fingers. Lynn's game superstitions start to annoy Lynn Sr., Luan, and Lincoln and the even the skating rink's usher Stern Fern (Megan Cavanagh).
165	33	"Room and Hoard"	Kyle Marshall & Ari Castleton	Katie Mattila	Kacie Hermanson & Ari Castleton	June 9, 2020	421B	0.59
Lynn Sr. and Rita go through the attic looking for the VHS tape for Kotaro about their trip to Cowbella as part of their friendaversary when they find a lot of their children's old stuff. When Lynn Sr. and Rita wants them to give up their stuff, the kids want to prove that they still make use of their old stuff. It soon starts to annoy Lynn Sr. and Rita, who want their kids to get rid of them.
166	34	"A Star is Scorned"	Jessica Borutski	Byron Dockins	Jules Bridgers	June 10, 2020	422A	0.53
During a photo shoot for Dr. Feinstein's dental practice, Lola finds that she can break out in big-time projects when the photographer sees her with Lily. After a gig at Gus's Games n' Grub, the photographer starts to like Lily and cut Lola's parts. With some advice from Leni, Lola plans to audition for the Reininger's Cutest Kid Competition held by Ms. Carmichael until she finds that Lily is the other finalist and starts to get jealous.
167	35	"Senior Moment"	Darin McGowan & Kyle Marshall	Sammie Crowley	Darin McGowan	June 11, 2020	422B	0.54
Lori goes to see the movie "Senior Year in Gear" with Carol Pingrey and Roger. Afterwards, Lori states that they have not done the stuff in the movie as a rite of passage as graduation is coming up. The three of them go to do the same stuff from the movie. In order to get the latest rite of passage, Lori, Carol, and Roger attend a party at Tad's house.
168	36	"Sand Hassles"	Jessica Borutski	Katie Mattila	Kacie Hermanson	June 15, 2020	424B	0.58
Principal Huggins and Cheryl are planning a third grade school trip to the beach at Lake St. Byron. Lucy and the Morticians Club are reluctantly to go to the event due to it being sunshine, sand, and sports as they work to change Huggins' mind. When it fails, they work to hide in their tent until a series of events involving Fangs sneaking off to play volleyball with a white pelican gets her roped in to the activities.
169	37	"Wheel and Deal"	Ari Castleton	Charlie Neuner	Sarah Johnson	June 17, 2020	423A	0.45
Bobbie Fletcher is back in town hosting a racing contest, where the winner will get to have a ride-along with her. Lana takes advantage of that and begins to build her own car called Loud Lightning like how Bobbie made her first car from scratch and brings Lincoln along as her co-driver. Due to the cars that were purchased by Chandler and the other racers, Lincoln worries that Loud Lightning would not match up with them.
170	38	"How Double Dare You!"	Darin McGowan	Joshua Hoskison	Darin McGowan	July 20, 2020	425A	0.58
The Loud siblings are watching Double Dare, where Marc Summers announces that it is coming to Royal Woods. With her siblings wanting to be slimed, Lisa helps them to get on Double Dare so that she can get a Galactic Labs space capsule. The tests rage on until only Lisa's robot aid in the tests called DareBot qualifies despite the fact that Lincoln and Leni are the only ones remaining. At the airing of Double Dare, Lisa and DareBot find that Lincoln and Leni are their opponents.
171	39	"Snoop's On"	Ari Castleton	Karla Sakas Shropshire	Jules Bridgers	July 21, 2020	425B	0.58
Looking for a novel to read for her school assignment as Lily is using all the books to make a fort out of them, Leni unknowingly reads Luna's diary which Lincoln gets involved in. After Luna's latest avictity, Luan and Mr. Coconuts get roped in. They find things in the diary that involves things like sneaking out of precalculus class with someone named Roxy to see a slasher movie at the Royal Woods Mall, getting a tattoo, and going to an underground music club. Lincoln, Leni, Luan, and Mr. Coconuts work to stop them.
172	40	"Friends in Dry Places"	Jessica Borutski	Jeff Sayers	Sarah Johnson	July 22, 2020	426A	0.69
There is a 5th grade field trip to Big Bear Dunes National Park as Lincoln learns that Lynn was close to somebody before entering middle school. Upon arrival at Big Bear Dunes National Park, Lincoln has a bad day that he finds that Clyde, Liam, Rusty, Zach, and Stella have been assigned to other students while he got assigned with Principal Huggins. Due to his friends doing well with the other students, Lincoln worries that their friendships are falling apart like Lynn mentioned as he works to save their friendships.
173	41	"Coupe Dreams"	Jessica Borutski	Katie Mattila	Jordan Koch	July 23, 2020	426B	0.62
Lori is planning to buy her own dream car for the day she goes to Fairway University. When she finds the car of her dreams, Lori finds that it costs a lot of money when Lynn Sr. and Rita bring it up. In order to afford it, Lori gets a second job at Royal Rides becoming a shuttle rider. Lori transports a lot of people to their locations. When she does not get the money she needs due to her place of occupation taking half of the proceeds, Lori starts to get other jobs like mobile babysitting and food delivery which starts to get out of control.

=== Season 5 (2020–22) ===
No. overall	No. in season	Title	Directed by	Written by	Storyboard by	Original release date	Prod. code	U.S. viewers (millions)
174	1	"Schooled!"	Kyle Marshall & Jessica Borutski	Whitney Wetta, Byron Dockins, Katie Mattila & Jeff Sayers	Jared Morgan, Kacie Hermanson, Stu Livingston & Jules Bridgers	September 11, 2020	501	0.79
174	1	"Schooled!"	Kyle Marshall & Jessica Borutski	Whitney Wetta, Byron Dockins, Katie Mattila & Jeff Sayers	Jared Morgan, Kacie Hermanson, Stu Livingston & Jules Bridgers	September 11, 2020	502	0.79
In this show's first one-hour episode, Lincoln, Clyde, Liam, Rusty, Zach, and Stella are starting middle school at Royal Woods Middle School, where Lynn is working as a hall monitor with plans not to let Principal Ramirez down. Due to a flippee stain being on the reminder to fill out a request form, Lincoln is unable to get a spot in Mrs. Salter's class because there's no room to fit in with his friends and ends up assigned to Mr. Bolhofner's class trailer instead, where Chandler constantly causes him problems. On Lori's part, she starts her new life at Fairway University where she has a hard time fitting in on a floor where silence is required as she tries to find the right floor. Also, Lynn Sr. and Rita work to get Lily potty-trained when she enrolls at Baby Bunker Preschool run by Dr. Shuttleworth. Due to the confusion because of Lori's absence, Leni accidentally attends Baby Bunker Preschool. Displeased with his learning conditions and to avoid his friends being thrown off, Lincoln plans to meet with Ramirez to have him switch classes. When this cannot be done, Ramirez instead has him transferred to another school in Mapleton, Ontario where Mapleton Middle School's Principal Marshall owed Ramirez a favor. Once he arrives there, Lincoln works to make the best of it as his friends work to carry on without him.
175	2	"The Boss Maybe"	Ari Castleton	Danny Warren	Sarah Johnson	September 18, 2020	503	0.49
175	2	"Family Bonding"	Jessica Borutski	Byron Dockins	Jordan Koch	September 18, 2020	503	0.49
Ms. Carmichael makes Leni the employee of the month. With Lori is already moving out at Fairway University, Leni is left in charge of her siblings while Lynn Sr. and Rita are away catering at the Renaissance fair. Leni works to keep her younger siblings in line while constantly calling Lori for advice when she ends up over her head. While Lincoln and Clyde are playing secret agents after reading a David Steele comic, Lynn reports that new neighbors have moved in next door. They meet their new neighbors Carly, Jeff, and Ryan Miller. Suspicious of the Millers being spies, Lincoln and Clyde work to obtain evidence to prove their claims to the rest of the Loud family.
176	3	"Strife of the Party"	Ari Castleton	Andrew Brooks	Jared Morgan	September 25, 2020	504	0.55
176	3	"Kernel of Truth"	Kyle Marshall	Katie Mattila	Colton Davis	September 25, 2020	504	0.55
Lana and Lola's birthday is coming up. Lola discovers that Lana is wanting to plan the birthday party this year with the help of her opossum Duncan as Lola has planned every birthday party. Worried that Lana will ruin the birthday party, Lola works to talk Lana out of doing things that involve poop-colored items, garbage, mud, and bugs. At Royal Woods Middle School, Lincoln, Clyde, Liam, Rusty, Zach, and Stella find an empty news studio while looking for the game room that Rusty's cousin Derek said there is. They get approval from Principal Ramirez to restart the news show which nobody has watched when Mrs. Gurdle was a part of. To improve the news program with some action, Lincoln and his friends investigate the missing popcorn and work to find the truth about it in a week or else Ramirez will cancel the show.
177	4	"Ghosted!"	Jessica Borutski	Jeff Sayers & Danny Warren	Stu Livingston & Jules Bridgers	October 9, 2020	505	0.61
At Fairway University, Lori is being haunted by a ghost at different points while preparing for the upcoming Petosky Open against Hillcrest University. In order to combat the ghosts, Lori arranges for Lynn Sr. to have Lincoln and Clyde brought to Fairway University. When they manage to drive the ghost away, Lori finds that everyone's game is a bit off, to the dismay of Coach Niblick. She learns that the ghost is the late caddy Shanks Bogey, who helped the players from the afterlife. Feeling regret, Lori works to find a way to bring Bogey's ghost back as Lincoln dispatches Lucy and the Morticians Club to help her out.
178	5	"Blinded by Science"	Jessica Borutski	Jeff Sayers	Jordan Koch	October 16, 2020	506	0.58
178	5	"Band Together"	Ari Castleton	Byron Dockins	Sarah Johnson	October 16, 2020	506	0.58
Lisa is preparing to give a presentation at Genius Con. While getting a Flippee with Lincoln, Lisa finds that Flip has some odd features and persuades him to be her subject at Genius Con so that it would be a big business for Flip's Food & Fuel. After presenting Flip at Genius Con, Lisa is approached by Dr. Carol Linnaeus (Janet Varney) of Incognito Laboratories who wants to do tests on Flip. Lisa soon that Incognito Labs is doing experiments on Flip to see if he will survive in outer space and enlists Lincoln and Clyde to rescue him. Following a gig at The Burnt Bean, Luna and the Moon Goats encounter Katie Krest at Lynn's Table who is in town launching a summer tour. Luna pitches to Sam, Mazzy, and Sully that they should promote themselves to Katie as they work to get her to hear them out. When the Moon Goats finally get her to listen to their music, Katie is more impressed with Luna as she can be put in a band where its lead singer has dropped out. When Luna meets the band members Reg, Bonnie, and Jolly Jim, Luna is left to decide if she should join the band or stay with the Moon Goats.
179	6	"Season's Cheatings"	Ari Castleton	Danny Warren	Stu Livingston	December 5, 2020	508	0.51
179	6	"A Flipmas Carol"	Kyle Marshall	Byron Dockins	Jules Bridgers	December 5, 2020	508	0.51
During the holiday season, the Loud Family is preparing for the upcoming family gift swap where they must buy a present for whoever's name is drawn. Wanting a Rip Hardcore backpack that doubles as a raft, Lincoln tapes the card with his name on it at the bottom of the hat that the names will be picked out of. As Lori will be home on Christmas Eve and Lily is now old enough, the name she draws will involve a gift that has finger-paint on it. With a setback in his plans, Lincoln tries to swap the names around with another sister with different results until he forgets to find a gift for Lola and gives in to a deal offered to him by Chandler. In this spoof of A Christmas Carol, Flip takes advantage of all the last minute of Holiday shoppers like Mr. Grouse, Cheryl and Meryl, the McBrides, and the Louds at Flip's Food & Fuel while having Lynn do all his deliveries to work off the property damage she accidentally caused. Later that night, Flip is visited by different Ghosts of Christmas. The Ghost of Christmas Past (portrayed by Lisa) takes Flip to his past where the misplacement of his ticket cost him a dance with Tammy Gobblesworth and then he was cheated by a younger Scoots. The Ghosts of Christmas Present (portrayed by Lincoln and Clyde) take Flip to show the bad sales he did. The Ghost of Christmas Yet to Come (portrayed by Lucy) shows Flip his future, where Flip's Food & Fuel shut down to lack of customers and nobody came to his funeral following his untimely death.
180	7	"Cow Pie Kid"	Kyle Marshall & Jared Morgan	Katie Mattila	Jared Morgan	January 22, 2021	507	0.55
180	7	"Saved by the Spell"	Jessica Borutski	Joshua Hoskison	Colton Davis	January 22, 2021	507	0.55
The Royal Woods Kangaroos have not won a baseball game due to constant pitcher changes and Lynn has been banned from pitching after throwing a ball at the goat mascot for the Bruinstown Billygoats. When Lynn Sr. pays a visit to the Hunnicut Farm and she witnesses his pitching ability, Lynn recruits him to join the Royal Woods Kangaroos in order to get a victory for them and is trained by her. Once the training is done, Liam starts to help turn the tide against their opponents. Though the constant pitching is causing his arm to hurt causing Lynn to seek help from Lisa and Lucy. Royal Woods Middle School is holding a talent show as Lincoln works to perfect his magic acts. Clyde, Liam, Rusty, Zach, and Stella are planning a dance act, where they are reluctant to have Lincoln perform magic act. They work to try to get Lincoln to not perform magic which goes comically awry for them. Their latest attempt involves Stella posing as a Swiss goat herder named Yodel Boy to mention about how his reputation was affected.
181	8	"No Bus No Fuss"	Ari Castleton	Andrew Brooks	Anna Hill & Ari Castleton	January 29, 2021	509	0.45
181	8	"Resident Upheaval"	Jessica Borutski	Katie Mattila	Jordan Koch	January 29, 2021	509	0.45
On the bus ride to Royal Woods Middle School, Lincoln runs afoul of three 8th graders named Anderson, Taylor, and Pablo. When Lincoln, Clyde, Liam, Rusty, Zach, and Stella try to get on their good side, they end up exiting the bus with wedgies. It is even the same on the ride home. To avoid the attacks on the bus, Lincoln and his friends try to find other ways to get to school like available parents trying to drive them, taking the city bus, and an airplane ride from Flip's Trips. Lincoln enjoys a day with Albert and Myrtle at Sunset Canyon Retirement Home where it is discovered that Myrtle does not officially live here. When Myrtle plans to move in, Seymour states that the Sunset Canyon board will have to decide on the other applicant. The other applicant turns out to be Clyde's grandmother Gayle (Loretta Devine). Lincoln and Clyde soon end up at odds as they plan to get their grandparents to win the spot by winning over the Sunset Canyon board members Seymour and Bernie causing them to take the deciding vote from the third board member Scoots who wants them to battle it out.
182	9	"School of Shock"	Kyle Marshall	Danny Warren	Darin McGowan	February 5, 2021	511	0.53
182	9	"Electshunned"	Kyle Marshall	Byron Dockins	Jules Bridgers	February 5, 2021	511	0.53
At Royal Woods Elementary School, Lisa constantly corrects Miss Allegra on some facts. This makes Miss Allegra frustrated enough to have her teach her class while she walks out. When she starts to do her teaching, Lisa starts teaching scientific facts which Darcy and the rest of Lisa's fellow students have a hard time learning and enlists DareBot 2.0 (an upgraded version of DareBot) to help her out. This even leads to a plot to bring learning to life with disastrous results. Leni is interning for Mayor Davis where she learns about her re-election. When Mayor Davis' campaign manager Vic McGillicutty rejects Leni's ideas to Mayor Davis, Leni brings it up with her family as they persuade her to run for mayor. Leni starts to promote her idea as Vic works to keep Leni from being elected. After Vic has Mayor Davis slander the Louds, Leni goes with Lola's hitting back idea. The campaign starts to get intense as Leni starts to regret hitting back.
183	10	"Zach Attack"	Jessica Borutski	Katie Mattila	Anna Hill	February 8, 2021	512	0.53
183	10	"Flying Solo"	Kyle Marshall	Whitney Wetta	Kevin Cannarile	February 8, 2021	512	0.53
Zach retrieves data stating that an alien spaceship is coming to Earth to watch an alien flyby which causes his friends, Chandler, Trent, Richie, Girl Jordan, and Emma to attend while getting the cookes that Mrs. Gurdle makes. When the aliens do not show up and everyone starts to leave, Zach enlists Rusty to convince everyone that they arrive which results in everyone and Zach's parents that the aliens crashed into Tall Timbers Park with Mr. Gurdle claiming that they are blending in with humans to prepare for an attack. Now Zach must find a way to fix it before things get worse. At Royal Woods Middle School, Lincoln, Clyde, Liam, Byron, and Paula are part of the glee club run by Mr. Budden while Rusty, Zach, and Stella are in the Home-Ec Club with Mr. Bolhofner. During the audition for the solo, Mr. Budden hears Lincoln sing and gives him the part for the competition as Clyde mentions that his great-aunts Hap and Hota are flying in from the Bahamas. This makes Clyde sad and jealous enough to do things that causes Lincoln to get laryngitis. When it happens, Clyde becomes the new solo singer and has a hard time struggling with the solo.
184	11	"Silence of the Luans"	Jessica Borutski	Whitney Wetta	Jared Morgan	March 26, 2021	510	0.53
184	11	"Undercover Mom"	Jessica Borutski	Jeff Sayers	Colton Davis	March 26, 2021	510	0.53
On April Fools' Day, Luan has been locked up in a cell in the basement even though she claims that she is done with pranking. Soon, different pranks go off one by one, with even Lisa's bunker being unsafe. Luan claims that she is not responsible and claiming that someone else is responsible. Wanting to help find the culprit while the other family members are away at the Burpin' Burger, Luan persuades Lincoln to help identify the culprit who happens to be the most unlikely suspect....Lily. At the Royal Woods Gazette, Rita gets inspired by Gary's undercover work when Leni, Luna, and Luan have not been open to her. Upon getting the approval from Jesse Hiller, Rita poses as a teenager named Britta to get close to her daughters. She begins to bond with them by, where she learns about their issues at school. Seeing that the girls open up to her, Rita continues to pose as Britta until she gets invited to the Loud House for dinner with Lynn Sr. trying to cover up her ruse.
185	12	"Hurl, Interrupted"	Jessica Borutski	Danny Warren	Stu Livingston	May 7, 2021	513	0.53
185	12	"Diamonds Are for Never"	Jessica Borutski	Jeff Sayers	Colton Davis	May 7, 2021	513	0.53
Following their latest roller derby victory and their celebration at the Burpin' Burger, Lynn, Margo, and Maddie learn from Paula that she won free tickets to Dairyland as a prize with Margo expressing interest to ride the latest roller coaster called Whipped Scream that makes everyone vulnerable to vomiting. Due to Lynn's fear of throwing up and Clyde telling her to live with it, Lynn works to stall her friends from riding the Whipped Scream. At the time when Lincoln was showing off his magic tricks, Lola notices that Mr. Grouse has found a fancy ring and will be participating in a fancy stones and metal show in order to make money from the stuff that he finds. As Mr. Grouse does not want to collaborate with her, Lola enlists Lisa to modify her jeep to contain treasure-tracking equipment. The search for the fancy stones and metals causes a competition between Lola and Mr. Grouse to see who can collect more of them first.
186	13	"Rumor Has It"	Kyle Marshall & Patrick Pakula	Byron Dockins	Michelle Hiraishi	May 14, 2021	514	0.36
186	13	"Training Day"	Jessica Borutski	Whitney Wetta	Butch Datuin	May 14, 2021	514	0.36
For the upcoming field trip to a quarry that is being chaperoned by Mrs. Salter, Mr. Bolhofner comes along as there are mentioned rumors from Cici, Girl Jordan, Chandler, Chandler's mom, and Chef Pat about him being either an escaped prisoner, a mobster, or a cannibal named "Skullhofner". Due to the wrong bus being procured, Bolhofner drives Lincoln, Clyde, Liam, Rusty, Zach, and Stella and takes a shortcut until a Flippee Syrup accident cancels the school trip as they bunk at his hunting cabin following a flat tire. Now they must see if the rumors about him are right or wrong. Stella gets a new rabbit named Jazzy who is one bad rabbit. As Stella's parents gave her a weekend to train Jazzy or else it would be sent to the house of her professional wrestling aunt and uncle, Stella enlists Lana to train Jazzy for the weekend. As Lana begins his training, she has some difficulty at first even when aided by Cliff, Geo, El Diablo, Bitey, and Izzy. After it causes damages to the Loud House, Lana takes Jazzy to the park to train her until it gets loose and goes on a rampage throughout Royal Woods.
187	14	"Director's Rut"	Kyle Marshall	Katie Mattila	Anna Hill	May 21, 2021	515	0.45
187	14	"Friday Night Fights"	Kyle Marshall	Jeff Sayers	Kevin Cannarile	May 21, 2021	515	0.45
Luan works on a play for the play-writing contest run by Mrs. Bernado, where the winner will direct it. She wins the contest and be "Don't Sassafras Me" about Chuckle Condo owner Joanie Sassafras who Shannon portrays. Luan starts to develops some issues with the improvised performances by Amy, Lyberti, Rex, Shannon, and Spencer as Mrs. Bernardo secretly watches the performances. Mr. Coconuts becomes involved in the directing, where he starts to make things difficult for everyone. The Royal Woods Roosters have lost a game against the Hazeltucky Hockers which depresses Lynn. Lisa offers her services to Lynn as an analytics coach since she does not want to see Lynn struggle. To assist her, Lisa creates the Touchdown Bot who helps to analyze the plays. Lisa's plays help the Royal Woods Roosters against the Slapneck Salamanders. Though Lynn gets annoyed when Lisa trades Maddie, Margo, and Paula with a bunch of random people and a tiger mascot which causes Lynn problems in her games.
188	15	"Grub Snub"	Jessica Borutski	Danny Warren	Stu Livingston	May 28, 2021	516	0.41
188	15	"She's All Bat"	Jessica Borutski	Byron Dockins	Colton Davis	May 28, 2021	516	0.41
With Dim Yum having gone out of business, Leni, Jackie, Mandee, Fiona, and Miguel opt to hang out at Gus' Games and Grub much to the dismay of Lincoln as it is the only place that works for Leni's friends. He states to Clyde, Liam, Rusty, Zach, and Stella that they have to take their restaurant back. This leads to Lincoln's group and Leni's group ending up in a competition called Gus' Game-A-Thon, where the loser group will be banned from returning. The shenanigans of this competition starts to annoy Gus Gamesngrub (Paul Scheer). During the Morticians Club's laterst gathering, Principal Huggins informs them that they must get another member to make it an official club or else they will be disbanded due to the School Clubs Act of 1875. After attempting to get some members their way, they have no choice but to ask Lola to join them. When she joins, Lola starts to do things that annoy Lucy, she plans to tamper with the School Club Act by finding an amendment. When that happens, the other Morticians Club start to miss Lola who does not want to leave the Morticians Club.
189	16	"Camped!"	Kyle Marshall & Patrick Pakula	Jeff Sayers & Danny Warren	Anna Hill, Mark Galez & Kevin Cannarile	May 31, 2021	518	0.41
Lynn Loud Sr. is saddened over the fact that Camp Mastodon, which is on the shores of Lake Michigan, is closing. This camp is where Lynn Sr. went with his father Leonard (Rick Zieff). Lincoln suggests to his sisters that they should visit Camp Mastodon with their father before it closes. Flip is also present for its closing due to him having also attended this camp and the family meets with its owner Mr. Rinsler who states that he cannot keep paying to keep it opened. While cleaning out Mr. Rinsler's cabin, Lincoln finds a map for the treasure of Captain Kit that he buried after the Great Lakes Storm of 1913. This causes Lincoln and Lynn Sr. to lead the family into going on a treasure hunt as they are secretly followed by Flip and contend with various obstacles along the way.
190	17	"Dad Reputation"	Jessica Borutski	Byron Dockins	Stu Livingston	July 16, 2021	519A	0.33
Lynn Loud Sr. has gotten together a new band called the Doo-Dads consisting of Kotaro, Harold McBride, and Rodney Spokes. Luna works to improve their performance for their upcoming gig where they recruit her to help get them off the ground. Luna worries that anyone that sees her with them will not be able to take her seriously as a rocker. So Luna works to keep Sam, Mazzy, and Sully from seeing her even when Mayor Davis books the Doo-Dads to perform in the festival at Tall Timbers Park.
191	18	"In the Mick of Time"	Patrick Pakula	Alec Schwimmer	Kevin Cannarile	July 16, 2021	521B	0.33
Mick Swagger is performing in Royal Woods and Luna gets tickets there with the help of Chunk. When Leni states that the band that is to perform at the school dance had to drop out while Mazzy and Sully sprained their ankles, Luna is persuaded to ask Mick Swagger to perform. Upon being unable to get through to Mick Swagger and she is unable to tell her friends, Leni, and Principal Rivers the truth, Luna is left to do a Mick Swagger impersonation at the suggestion of Chunk.
192	19	"Much Ado About Noshing"	Patrick Pakula	Andrew Brooks	Michelle Hiraishi	August 27, 2021	517	0.42
192	19	"Broadcast Blues"	Jessica Borutski	Katie Mattila	Butch Datuin	August 27, 2021	517	0.42
Lynn Sr. finds out that Lynn's Table has gotten a bad review on the review website Nosh from NewNosher123 and the kids find out about. To find the culprit that is in Royal Woods, Lincoln has his sisters look for suspects and interview the other restaurants that got a thumbs down. With their suspects being Principal Huggins, Mr. Grouse, Scoots, Mrs. Bernardo, and Flip, Lincoln, his sisters, and Todd plan to lure their suspects to Lynn's Table to find out who is NewNosher123. At Royal Woods Middle School, Lincoln, Clyde, Liam, Rusty, Zach, and Stella are in need of new broadcasting equipment for the Action News. They are approached by Chandler who offers them new broadcasting equipment. In exchange, he wants them to join the Action News Team. When that happens, Chandler makes things difficult for them by wanting a bigger part in exchange for more broadcasting equipment. Now they must find a way to get Chandler off the Action News.
193	20	"Lori Days"	Jessica Borutski	Danny Warren	Anna Hill	August 27, 2021	521A	0.42
Ever since she started Fairway University, Lori has missed a lot of stuff. At the advice of her classmate Marisa, Lori visits home for the weekend to see her family. As her siblings have plans, Lori tags along to the different activities in order to get caught up with them. When the first day goes wrong, Lori gathers her siblings for different activities the next day like the minigolf course, Dairyland, and Tall Timbers Pond which goes comically awry.
194	21	"Dream a Lily Dream"	Patrick Pakula	Andrew Brooks	Colton Davis & Mark Galez	August 27, 2021	519B	0.42
Lily has been having recurring nightmares and neither of the family members understand her descriptions. Upon getting a description of Trashy and Tentacle, Lisa invents a dream machine in order to enter Lily's dream where she brings Lincoln, Lynn, Lola, and Leni along for the ride. After Lisa's Lull-a-Bot helps them into Lily's dream, Lisa, Lincoln, Lynn, Lola, and Leni search for the nightmares plaguing Lily. Meanwhile, the rest of the family work to keep Lily from waking up while everyone is in Lily's dream.
195	22	"Fright Bite"	Patrick Pakula	Leah Longoria	Kevin Cannarile	October 15, 2021	524A	0.38
Lucy and the Morticians Club watch the season finale of "Vampires of Melancholia" revolving around vampire extinction when they find an activity occurring in a nearby spooky house. When they go inside, they find that it is inhabited by a man that they suspect is a vampire even when they see him in the day and suspect him to be a daywalker. They conspire to get converted into vampires and try to get his attention.
196	23	"Animal House"	Patrick Pakula	Jeff Sayers	Butch Datuin	October 29, 2021	520B	0.44
Lana works at the Royal Woods Pet Adoption Center with Sam. She is told by Sam that it is getting overcrowded and that they need to find new homes for the exotic pets. Not wanting them to be sent to the Exotic Pet Playground in Ohio, Lana plans to have them given to other people in Royal Woods. She works to give a penguin named Willy to Mr. Grouse, a llama named Larry to Liam, and a flying squirrel named Squirt to Howard and Harold McBride with comical and exhausting results.
197	24	"Fam Scam"	Jessica Bortuski	Byron Dockins	Stu Livingston	November 5, 2021	522	0.34
197	24	"Farm to Unstable"	Patrick Pakula	Katie Mattila	Colton Davis	November 5, 2021	522	0.34
During one of her pageants, Lola meets a sophisticated pageant legend named Cricket Van Doran. While working to impress her, Lola learns that she wants to meet her family. As her family would be too wacky for her, Lola plans to have the McBride family pretend to be her family. While Howard and Harold are away, Clyde cooks for them as Lola works to keep him from dropping character. This works until a trip to the Royal Woods Mall when Lola's siblings, Howard, and Harold show up. At Royal Woods Middle School, Liam informs Lincoln, Clyde, Rusty, Zach, and Stella about the Hunnicut Farm Stand while Mee Maw sprained his ankle wrestling Virginia the Pig and his father and brother are at an egg convention. This causes Liam's friends to help out. While Rusty takes care of Mee Maw and Liam does his assignments, the others struggle to get the farm assignments done. In order to finish the farm work in time for the farm stand, Lincoln has no choice but to lead Clyde, Zach, and Stella in purchasing farm products from Flip since the Super Mart is closed to have its floors cleaned.
198	25	"Diss the Cook"	Jessica Borutski	Jeff Sayers	Michelle Hiraishi	November 12, 2021	523	0.36
198	25	"For Sale by Loner"	Patrick Pakula	Byron Dockins	Butch Datuin	November 12, 2021	523	0.36
At Royal Woods Middle School, Turkey Leg Tuesday is occurring. Unfortunately, Chef Pat gives Lincoln a tiny turkey leg as things like that have been happening since he started middle school. When Lincoln is told by Chef Pat that he has no beef with him, he learns that the same thing has happened to Lynn who agrees to find out if Lori, Leni, Luna, Luan had wronged Chef Pat. Even after Lori apologized for spilled soup, Lincoln and Lynn find that Chef Pat has a beef with Rita. Mr. Grouse has started to get annoyed with the antics of the Loud family inside and outside his house. Having reached his wits' ends, Mr. Grouse decides to move away to get away from their noise and nonsense. He rents a place to live until his house his sold. First he rents a condo room from Cheryl and Meryl at Chateau Royal Condos until music from their hoedown competition rehearsal keeps him up. Then he tries Sunset Canyon Retirement Home until Scoots starts a pudding balloon fight and then a room on Coach Pacowski's houseboat. With help from Flip in his Rick's Rents & Rocks business, he moves into Flip's cabin until he gets lonely and tries to befriend another person whose lives in nature....Mr. Bolhofner.
199	26	"The Loudly Bones"	Patrick Pakula	Jeff Sayers	Colton Davis	November 26, 2021	524B	0.67
Lisa has found what appears to be a dinosaur bone in the family's front yard. Using her machine, she finds it from an unknown era and posts it on the Fossil Friends website. After Charles breaks it during a fight with Todd, Lisa finds that they are bone fragments from her father's turgoosen. Lisa plans to tell the truth only for Katherine Mulligan and the press outside alongside paleontologist Dr. Alvarez from the Royal Woods Museum. Alvarez offers Lisa her own TV show and is swayed into getting other children into science. During a live show at the Royal Woods Museum, Alvarez wants to have the tests on the "dinosaur bone" she found in the carbon-dating machine causing her to replace it with a Tyrannosaurus bone.
200	27	"How the Best Was Won"	Jessica Borutski	Katie Mattila	Michelle Hiraishi	December 11, 2021	520A	0.24
At Royal Woods Middle School, Lincoln and Clyde learn during an announcement from Principal Ramirez about the "Middle School's Best" contest which will determine who is the best in everything. Lincoln and Clyde plan to win the "Best Bud" category. When they see Zach and Rusty are trying out, the four of them get into a fight and they try to 1-up each other in every way, such as billboards. When Lincoln discovers a game show called "How Much Do You Know Your Chinchilla" which has a similar contest, he and Clyde stage their own version to compete against Zach and Rusty with Liam and Stella caught in the middle on hosting duty.
201	28	"Appetite for Destruction"	Jessica Borutski	Danny Warren	Michelle Hiraishi	January 16, 2022	526	0.50
201	28	"Frame on You"	Patrick Pakula	Byron Dockins	Butch Datuin	January 16, 2022	526	0.50
At Lynn's Table, the Loud children have just had some pasta with parmesan in light of receiving a lot of it from Lynn Sr.'s Italian pen pal Furio as it keeps coming. Lily starts acting vicious, rude, and deceptive. Suspecting that someone at Royal Woods Preschool is behind the misbehavior, Lynn Sr. and Rita send Leni to spy on Lily. She finds that the students at Royal Woods Preschool also behaved badly in front of Dr. Shuttleworth as Lynn Sr. and Rita look for a friendly toddler for Lily to befriend. At Royal Woods Middle School, Stella covers the news of Rusty getting suspended for a week by Principal Ramirez for setting off a stink bomb at the school dance. As the Action News Team work to investigate, Rusty poses as a substitute teacher to sneak back into school. Meeting with Meryl in her "Midnight Goose" alias, the Action News Team interrogating the witnesses like Coach Keck, Paige, Chandler, Dirk, and Boy Jordan as well as speaking with Flip. The Action News Team soon find out that the person who framed Rusty is someone they'd least suspect.
202	29	"Runaway McBride"	Jessica Bortuski	Katie Mattila	Stu Livingston	March 4, 2022	525	0.33
202	29	"High Crimes"	Jessica Bortuski	Whitney Wetta	Anna Hill	March 4, 2022	525	0.33
On Waltz Night at the McBride House, Clyde tells his dads that he will be attending the football game with his friends as Howard and Harold claim that Clyde is spending less time with them. Howard and Harold plan to get Clyde and his friends to hang out at their house as they research the areas where they hang out. After researching each one, Howard and Harold set up their house to match up to their activities. They do each one as each activity goes comically awry. At Sunset Canyon Retirement Home, Lincoln and Clyde are playing badminton with Myrtle and Gayle as Mayor Davis' former campaign manager Vic McGillicutty is now working as a birthday clown as part of his parents' balloon business. When certain items are broken, Lincoln and Clyde get inspired by a David Steele comic where they suspect that someone is sabotaging Sunset Canyon Retirement Home. With help from Lisa, DareBot 2.0, and Todd, Lincoln and Clyde receive upgraded equipment to help solve the mysteries disguised as old men while getting unlikely help from Gayle.

=== Season 6 (2022–23) ===
No. overall	No. in season	Title	Directed by	Written by	Storyboard by	Original release date	Prod. code	U.S. viewers (millions)
203	1	"Don't Escar-go"	Jessica Borutski	Whitney Wetta	Stu Livingston	March 11, 2022	602	0.31
203	1	"Double Trouble"	Patrick Pakula	Jeff Sayers	Colton Davis	March 11, 2022	602	0.31
Clyde treats Lincoln, Liam, Rusty, Zach, and Stella to his French food as mentions about Gayle stated that her old friend Fleur Dupont of a French cooking academy as he must provide a dinner for her as a final exam with Howard, Harold, Gayle, and Seymour present. Unfortunately, the academy is in Paris. To keep Clyde from moving to Paris by making the French food in Royal Woods, Lincoln enlists his father and Chef Pat for help. When it all fails, Lincoln, Liam, Rusty, Zach, and Stella have no choice but to sabotage the dinner for Fleur with comical results. At Auntie Pam's Ice Cream Parlor, Lola and Lana get served ice cream as they learn about the upcoming Double Trouble flavor where the contest will have them going against all of Royal Woods' twins to earn the spot of Double Trouble Twins. While they have competitors like Mr. Grouse and Flip, Liam's two goats, and Scoops and Mopes, they find that they got real competition in Cheryl and Meryl. The competition is fierce until Cheryl and Meryl were declared the winners. Lola and Lana plan to get Cheryl and Meryl into bickering so that they can become the new Double Trouble Twins.
204	2	"Flip This Flip"	Jessica Borutski	Kevin Sullivan	Michelle Hiraishi	March 18, 2022	603	0.31
204	2	"Haunted House Call"	Patrick Pakula	Erica Eastrich	Butch Datuin	March 18, 2022	603	0.31
In a connection with "A Flipmas Carol", Flip has been hesitating in calling his middle school crush Tammy Gobblesworth (Jodi Benson) as Lincoln and Lana learn about it from his raccoon friend Nacho. Wanting to help Flip out, Lincoln, Lana, Leni, Lola, and Lisa make Flip presentable for a dinner with Tammy at Lynn's Table when he learns that Tammy is a tycoon. Lincoln and his sisters work to make sure Flip's dinner with Tammy at Lynn's Table and a trip to the opera go off without a hitch. Lucy and the Morticians Club sell homemade Eyeball Pops in order to raise money for tickets to Casket Con when they help Mr. Grouse with a ghost problem with the ghost of his house' old owner Lady Emmeline. Afterwards, Lucy gets inspired to lead the Morticians Club to handle the ghost problems of Rodney, Liam, and Cheryl and Meryl. When all the ghosts have been dealt with, Lucy and the Morticians Club raise the spirit of a prankster named Buzz to help them out as he haunts Scoots. Once that was done, Lucy and the Mortician's Club must work to coral Buzz before he haunts all of Royal Woods.
205	3	"The Taunting Hour"	Patrick Pakula	Andrew Brooks	Stu Livingston	March 25, 2022	605	0.39
205	3	"Musical Chairs"	Patrick Pakula	Jeff Sayers	Colton Davis	March 25, 2022	605	0.39
Lynn gets heckled by Scoots during her soccer game who calls her an emu. Finding out about what Scoots did to Lynn, Lincoln remedies this situation by showing Lynn footage of other known hecklers like a pageant judge talking bad about Lola, The Burnt Bean manager criticizing Luna's music, Mr. Grouse talking bad about Lynn Sr.'s cooking, Rita getting a bad letter from someone who claimed that she ruined her life, a negative comment on Luan's comedy blog, and a scientist criticizing Todd during Lisa's presentation. When the rest of the family are informed, it causes them to freeze up during their activities the next day. Mr. Bolhofner teaches his class about whale survival when Chandler keeps getting Lincoln in trouble with Bolhofner who denies his seat-reassigning proposition when he later speaks to him about it. With advice from Rusty, Lincoln works to butter up Bolhofner by doing things for him until he finds him playing the bass drum. This gives Lincoln the idea to have Bolhofner show off his bass drum playing to the Doo-Dads. He starts to do some changes to the band much to the dismay of Lynn Sr., Harold, Kotaro, and Rodney. Note: When this episode aired, "Musical Chairs" was shown first before "The Taunting Hour". Later airings corrected this error.
206	4	"A Bug's Strife" "All the Rage"	Jessica Borutski Patrick Pakula	Kevin Sullivan Kellie Griffin	Michelle Hiraishi Butch Datuin	April 1, 2022	606	0.25
A sick Lynn Loud Sr. has the house to himself while Rita takes the children to Aunt Ruth's house where she'll show them her 700 picture slideshow of her Malls of the Midwest tour. Once they are gone, Lynn Sr. drops his routine and enjoys a day with himself much to the dismay of Charles, Cliff, Geo, and Walt. After putting the pets outside, his peace and quiet is disrupted by a cricket as he works to find it, catch it, and get rid of it with comical results as the pets get a good laugh out of it. At Royal Woods Middle School, Bolhofner oversees dodgeball week while Coach Keck is at a gym teacher's conference. Clyde arrives where he shows off and develops the rage when his favorite contestant Zahmir on "Operation: Dessert Storm" gets disqualified. Inspired by Clyde's event, Lincoln, Liam, Rusty, Zach, and Stella plan to bring out Clyde's rage for the remainder of dodgeball week. Mr. Bolfhofner extends dodgeball week since Coach Keck is stuck at the gym teacher convention. Also, Clyde finds that Zahmir was re-admitted on "Operation: Dessert Storm". Now Lincoln must lead his friends in bringing out Clyde's rage against the 8th grades.
207	5	"Scoop Snoop" "Eye Can't"	Jessica Borutski Patrick Pakula	Byron Dockins Whitney Wetta	Anna Hill Kevin Cannarile	April 8, 2022	607	0.38
At Royal Woods Middle School, the Action News Team is covering stories only to be beaten to the scoop by Katherine Mulligan. Suspicious that someone is leaking the stories to her, the Action News Team suspect that someone at Royal Woods Middle School is responsible. After suspecting that Chef Pat and art teacher Mr. Mu where they have an alibi, they follow Katherine Mulligan around Royal Woods, where they find her interacting with Principal Ramirez. Lynn Sr. and Rita have noticed that Lisa has been having incidents where she is in need of new glasses. They advise that Lisa goes to the eye doctor. Lisa mentions to Todd that she has a fear of optometrists. At the advice of Todd, Lisa makes her own glasses which starts to affect her eyesight. Lynn Sr. and Rita work to get Lisa to the optometrist as she pulls out every stop to reach the optometrist Dr. Tran. After each one fails and Dr. Tran claims that the procedure is painless, Lisa enlists Todd to help get her away from Dr. Tran's Optometry and tries to go on the lam with comical results.
208	6	"Dine and Bash" "Sofa, So Good"	Jessica Borutski Patrick Pakula	Andrew Brooks Jeff Sayers	Stu Livingston Colton Davis	April 15, 2022	608	0.30
Lincoln and his sisters arrive at Lynn's Table to help with the afternoon rush while Rita is helping Lori in the mother/daughter golf game at Fairway University. As Lynn Sr. partakes in a gig at Sunset Canyon Retirement Home, the kids run the Lynn's Table when it is visited by celebrity chef Guy Grazer for his TV show "Kitchen Ambush". After failing to impress Guy Grazer due to Leni ruining the cookbook and not wanting to interrupt their father, the kids and Todd work to obtain the footage and delete it before the latest episode ruins the reputation of Lynn's Table. Lynn Sr. and Rita give the kids a surprise at 4:00 where they do not want any disasters to happen before they return. The kids work to chill out until they accidentally broke the sofa and get the other furniture dirty when a fight breaks out. As the furniture in question is put outside, they clean up the stuff and find the furniture accidentally picked up by the garbage truck and then picked up by Flip in his Dom's Driving and Dumpster Diving, where he claims that he sold the furnitue to every. Lynn and Lincoln get the coffee table from Mr. Bolhofner, Lucy and Lana get the TV from Cheryl and Meryl, and Leni and Lola get the floor lamp from the Royal Woods Auction House. Then they find that Flip and Nacho using the couch to give Scoots and Tyler a love tour and they must retrieve it before Lynn Sr. and Rita come home.
209	7	"Present Danger" "Stressed for the Part"	Jessica Borutski Patrick Pakula	Andrew Brooks Byron Dockins	Anna Hill Kevin Cannarile	May 30, 2022	601	0.36
At Gus' Games 'n Grub, Lincoln is celebrating his David Steele-themed 12th birthday with his parents, friends (who are dressed as different David Steele characters), and Leonard. The gift from his dad and Leonard suddenly goes missing. Lincoln acts like David Steele in order to find out who stole his birthday present. Reviewing the footage with Gus, Lincoln suspects that Scoots, Flip, and/or Chandler were responsible. After a game of "Go Fish" with them, Lincoln finds that none of them stole them meaning that someone else was responsible. Luan successfully auditions for the role of Heidi Heifer, a character in a Dairyland Amusement Park stage production. However, she has to hide the news from her acting coach Mrs. Bernardo, whom she beat out for the role. When Luan misplaces her script, she and her boyfriend Benny have to find it before Mrs. Bernardo learns about her role.
210	8	"Time Trap!"	Jessica Borutski & Patrick Pakula	Andrew Brooks & Jeff Sayers	Michelle Hiraishi & Butch Datuin	June 3, 2022	612	0.31
Lynn Sr. and Rita have a vase that was a wedding gift and has a history of it being broken that involved the kids getting grounded. The latest incident is caused by Lori's indoor golf course. Inspired by Lola's claim that Lynn Sr. and Rita should have never received the gift, Lisa recalls how she perfected time travel (as seen in "The Mad Scientist") and plans to go alone due to her siblings being reckless and creates a time machine from Vanzilla in order to swap the vase with a toaster. Unfortunately, the rest of the siblings stowaway and Lisa has them come along. Due to the hilarious outcome that affected the reception and Mr. and Mrs. Gurdle mistaking them for aliens, the kids discover that they caused a timeline where Lynn Sr. and Rita never had kids, Mr. Grouse looks nice, Chunk works in the garbage dump, Chandler has taken Lincoln's place in the friend group, and Flip runs a health food store. After learning about what happened at the reception, they must fix history before they disappear forever.
211	9	"Bummer Camp" "Sleepstakes"	Jessica Borutski Patrick Pakula	Byron Dockins Whitney Wetta	Anna Hill Kevin Cannarile	June 10, 2022	610	0.41
The Loud House gets a call from Leonard stating that a new bunch of campers are coming and that all the counselors have quit during camping. In order to help Leonard and keep him from returning to the sea, Lincoln leads his sisters into helping their grandfather as counselors. While having them sleep on his boat, Leonard puts them through training in the style of working on his boat. The kids have a hard time trying to tell Leonard that he needs to run this camp like a camper as they guide him through it. Lisa's new mail system delivers the mail received from the mail carrier as Lana has been invited to her friend Kayla's slumber party attended by Kristen and Ashley. Lincoln leads his sisters into training Lana for the slumber party like camping in the backyard, camping in Mr. Grouse's house, and camping in Sunset Canyon Retirement Home. On the day of the sleepover, Lana's time there goes awry as her siblings come to help her out with comical results.
212	10	"The Last Laugh" "Driver's Dread"	Jessica Borutski Patrick Pakula	Kevin Sullivan Matthew Malach	Michelle Hiraishi Butch Datuin	June 17, 2022	609	0.33
As Lola is driving around upstairs following the completion of pageant season, Mr. Coconuts suffers a crossing accident as Luan persuades Lola to be her acting ventriloquist dummy until further notice. Though Luan gets a call from Dr. Ted stating that Mr. Coconuts is ready to be discharged. Though Luan hesitates to pick up Mr. Coconuts until Lynn Sr. brings him home as Luan suspects that Mr. Coconuts. Though Luan and Lola find a series of misfortunes as Mr. Coconuts is the main suspect. Taking place before "Bummer Camp", Leni hears from Lori that they will be a 50% sale at the outlet mall. Lori advises Leni to try to get her driver's license. She tries to find other ways to get to Lori like trying to get her parents to driver her only for them to be unavailable. Lincoln also persuades Leni to get her driver's license after mentioning how long it took for Rusty to get a cartwheel. She takes her driver's exam from different characters like Mr. Bolhofner, Mr. Grouse, and Todd until she gets inspired by Lisa's self-driving stroller for her next exam when Lori will not be home during Spring break.
213	11	"Cat-astrophe" "Prize Fighter"	Jessica Borutski Patrick Pakula	Roxy Simons Kevin Sullivan	Stu Livingston Colton Davis	June 24, 2022	611	0.38
As the McBride family hold a party for Cleopawtra and Nepurtiti's graduation from Madame Furball's Academy for Refined Females, Gayle calls them up to ask when they are coming over for her birthday. Having forgotten, they work to get the plans for Gayle's birthday party to work as Cleopawtra and Nepurrtiti are left to watch over the house. They get inspired to use the stuff from the graduation party for Gayle's party with help from Mrs. Bernardo in her Catarina the Cat alias which goes comically awry. Lola finds out from Meryl is covering for Cheryl who is helping to decide who will win Miss McFiggle Lifetime Achievement Award. The other two judges are Dana Dufresne and Howard McBride. Lola plans to do nice things like helping Mr. Grouse across the street, cleaning up Tall Timbers Park in front of Dana, and working as a candy striper at Sunset Canyon Retirement Home at the time when Howard dropped off Clyde at Gayle. After overhearing two girls claiming that the award being cursed where those who won the award never competed in the pageants again, Lola works to avoid the award until Cricket Van Doran tells her the truth about it.
214	12	"Save Royal Woods!"	Jessica Borutski	Byron Dockins & Whitney Wetta	Anna Hill & Kevin Cannarile	July 1, 2022	604	0.38
In this second musical episode, Mayor Davis holds a town meeting where State Undersecretary of Water Leisure Joyce Crandall (Christine Baranski) has a plan for Michigan's sixth Great Lake called Lake Gladys which she named after her mother. To pull it off, she will create it from Royal Woods due to it not being popular like Hazeltucky, Beaverton, Fern Valley, Sandy Flats, and Petoskey Falls which will be enough to get her promotion to State Oversecretary of Water Leisure from the governor. As Joyce will be back in a few days with a demolition team, Lincoln pitches an idea to the citizens of Royal Woods to find something that would make Royal Woods memorable as Mayor Davis makes him an honorary Mayor Jr. They do various things that would be memorable in order to get Crandall to call off the demolition.
215	13	"Puns and Buns"	Jared Morgan	Whitney Wetta	Kevin Cannarile	July 8, 2022	613B	0.31
At the Burpin' Burger, Benny has been promoted to assistant manager by his boss Andre. Luan missed spending time with Benny since Dairyland closed for the season and plans to work with him. He convinces Andre to hire Luan due to Otis being injured from the sign as Andre covers for Otis. Benny trains Luan in different jobs as she does comedy in each one which is annoying Andre. As Andre wants Benny to fire Luan, he is reluctant to do the job without losing his position and causing Luan to break up with him.
216	14	"Food Courting"	Jared Morgan	Kevin Sullivan	Colton Davis & Max Alley	July 8, 2022	614B	0.31
At the Royal Woods Mall, Leni finds out that Miguel is in love with Spaghetti on a Stick worker Gavin which he avoided having Leni find out. Leni offers to help Miguel win over Gavin which goes comically awry. At Dairyland, Leni ends up in the same boat as Gavin where Leni tries to get him to be into Miguel only for Gavin to start being into Leni. Now Leni must find a way to cover it up to Miguel without making him feel sad.
217	15	"Lights, Camera, Nuclear Reaction"	Jessica Borutski	Andrew Brooks	Stu Livingston	July 15, 2022	614A	0.29
Lincoln and Clyde work on their homemade David Steele home movie involving M.A.L.I.C.E. agent Chip Micro (portrayed by Todd) with funding from Flip. The next plan is interrupted by Lisa who stated that the nuclear reactor she created for the film has gone missing. Lincoln, Clyde, Lisa, and Todd find that Flip had been near it. When they caught up to Flip and Nacho, they had no knowledge of the theft. Lisa discovered that she forgot to turn off the villain switch on Todd as they find him at an abandoned warehouse with help from DareBot, FriendBot 1000, and Mr. Reinforced Titanium Alloy Arms.
218	16	"Save the Last Pants"	Jessica Borutski	Caitlin Fein	Michelle Hiraishi	July 15, 2022	615A	0.29
As Gus is debuting a new pizza flavor at Gus's Games & Grubs, Rodney shows up wanting Rusty to watch over Duds for Dudes while he goes to Hazeltucky to get the wrong swatches exchanged with his fabric guy. After being trained in running the story, Rusty becomes too busy. To remedy this, Rusty brings the joy of Gus' to Duds for Dudes. When Rodney states that Mick Swagger is coming in to Duds for Dudes for the pants that were purchased by Tyler, Rusty must enlist his friends to get the pants back from Tyler.
219	17	"A Major Hiccup" "Hiccups and Downs"	Jessica Borutski	Byron Dockins	Anna Hill	July 29, 2022	616A	0.18
Luna is excited that Moon Goats have made it to the finals of the Rock Rumble. Unfortunately, Luna has come down with a case of the hiccups. Her siblings come up with different remedies like Lana's garbage remedy, Lucy and Luan's scare tactics, and Lynn and Lincoln's hiccup eradicator that would send it out the other end until Lisa invents Hiccup-B-Gone which provides temporary relief. At rehearsal, Luna finds that she left her bag in the Hiccup-B-Gone in Chunk's van. Luna enlists his sibling to find Chunk so that she can get the Hiccup-B-Gone from her bag before the Rumble Rock.
220	18	"The Loathe Boat"	Patrick Pakula	Whitney Wetta	Kevin Cannarile	August 5, 2022	616B	0.21
Lucy and the Morticians Club hold an emergency meeting where they get a pelican containing a message from Bertrand. The S.S. Funtime that his parents Brad and Quinn are working on is docked at Lake Eddy and he needs them to rescue him. Once onboard, they find Bertrand with a suntan and he states that he cannot handle the activities on the S.S. Funtime. The Morticians Club come up with plans to get Bertrand off while avoiding Brad and Kim like having a pelican carry him off, sneaking him off in a coffin, greasing sunscreen on him to get him down the slide, and getting the cruise cancelled by haunting it with various results.
221	19	"Crashed Course"	Jessica Borutski	Byron Dockins	Anna Hill	September 5, 2022	613A	0.19
Lincoln and Lisa examine a package that might've been sent by Ronnie Anne only to find Lori's progress report in there with failing grades. Lincoln holds an emergency meeting where Leni suspects that she is not doing her studies. As Lori has denied their help, Lincoln leads his sisters to go to Fairway University and spy on her David Steele style. They work to dispose of every one of Lori's distractions. Once that is done, they return after seeing another progress report which leads them to come up with another plan.
222	20	"A Stella Performance"	Pat Pakula	Erica Eastrich	Butch Datuin & Yaron Farkash	September 5, 2022	615B	0.19
At the Royal Woods Middle School science fair, Stella shows off her invention to its judges and gives her 1st place as Principal Ramirez plans to enter her in the State Science Fair. In addition, Stella finds out that she must give a speech to the middle school board which makes her weary. This was because of her botching a teacher appreciation award at her last school. Lincoln, Clyde, Liam, Rusty, and Zach work to get Stella out of her fear of public speaking with comical results.
223	21	"Cheer Pressure" "Stroke of Luck"	Jessica Borutski Patrick Pakula & Jared Morgan	Roxy Simons Andrew Brooks	Colton Davis Max Alley	September 9, 2022	617	0.27
Coach Keck introduces her students to a real kangaroo named Crikey instead of a kangaroo mascot. Due to Coach Keck needing room for her massage therapist Dennis (who Coach Keck keeps calling Hans), Lynn, Margo, and Paula are selected to ride in the cattle trailer with Crikey. Due to Lynn claiming that basketball players being better than cheerleaders, Lynn, Margo, and Paula end up in a cheer off with the loser riding with Crikey for the whole season. When their training goes wrong, Lynn, Margo, and Paula receive help from Cheryl and Meryl who are experts at cheerleading. At Fairyway University, Lori pulls off a hole in one during Coach Niblick's exams. After pulling off a perfect 18, Lori finds that the golf ball in question was made by Lisa Loud. When called up by Lori, Lisa reveals that it was a flag-seeking ball. As Lori plans to break the news, Lori finds that the word of her perfect 18 having spread throughout Fairway University and meets a man named Davey Divots who caters to her. As Lori plans to come clean about the truth, Davey keeps doing stuff for her which causes her to delay telling the truth as she envisions what happens if she tells them the truth.
224	22	"Space Jammed" "Crown and Dirty"	Jessica Borutski Patrick Pakula	Kevin Sullivan Byron Dockins	Michelle Hiraishi Butch Datuin & Yaron Farkash	September 16, 2022	618	0.20
Lisa is doing her usual science work that involves creating a rocket for the Norwegian government that can be controlled from Earth. Leni keeps interfering while babysitting the rest of the siblings. After persistent interference from Leni in Lisa's room and the garage, Lisa and Todd decide to test the rocket by blasting off into space. When the thrusters are offline, Lisa works to repair them. Afterwards, she loses control of the ship and has no choice but to enlist Leni for help. As Lincoln and Luna are watching TV, they come across Dana Dufresne announcing the Little Miss Mothers and Daughters Pageant which her mother Didi Dufresne. Hearing about the news, Lola wants to get involved as she hears about Rita getting involved in the pageant. Thanks to Leni giving it away, Rita enters her and Lola in the Little Miss Mothers and Daughters Pageant as Lola trains Rita in the art of pageantry. After each training method fails, Lola finds herself unable to work with Rita and covers it up with a cancellation as she ends up getting a mom replacement in Mrs. Bernardo who Lola convinces to portray Rita.
225	23	"The Orchid Grief" "Forks and Knives Out"	Jessica Borutski Patrick Pakula	Abi Wurdeman & Phil Wurdeman Alejandro Bien-Willner	Anna Hill Kevin Cannarile	September 23, 2022	619	0.27
Lincoln visits Clyde to inform that the limited edition David Steele comic made of steel is on sale as he helps him get his chores done. When Lincoln unknowingly waters the eternal love orchid that can be only watered every 12 hours, it dies as Clyde states that Harold gave it to Howard. With help from Lisa, Lincoln and Clyde are directed to a swamp in Michigan that has harsh and unforgivable terrain. Lincoln and Clyde go through it while dealing with giant mosquitoes, alligators, the quicksand, Venus mantraps, and a mysterious person who is also after the eternal love orchid while running into an elderly cruise operated by Mr. Bolhofner. Lincoln beats Lynn Sr. in the Muscle Fish video game when Lynn Sr. gets a Guy Grazer bobblehead stating that he has been invited to partake in Kitchen Nightmare where chefs make dishes while trying to sabotage each other. With Luan busy, Lincoln becomes Lynn Sr.'s sous chef. On Kitchen Nightmare, Lynn Sr. and Lincoln find that their opponents are Rosa Casagrande and Ronnie Anne Santiago. The prize is a voice-activated refrigerator called the Thriller Chiller 3000. Now Lynn Sr. and Rosa are pressured by Guy Grazer to finishing each challenge while uping the prizes.
226	24	"The Loud Cloud" "You Auto Know Better"	Jessica Borutski Patrick Pakula	Andrew Brooks Jeff Sayers	Colton Davis Max Alley	September 30, 2022	620	0.25
Rita has been using sticky note system for her family which is covering up the refrigerator. In order to get a modern solution, Lincoln enlisted Lisa for help. They created the Loud Cloud App so that Rita can be more organized. Everything turns out good for Rita so far until Lynn Sr. has trouble reading his recipe cards. This causes Lincoln and Lisa to upgrade the Loud Cloud App for Lynn Sr.'s use. Soon, everyone wants upgrades to the Loud Cloud App which starts to cause low memory problems and a big overload. While on a bike ride with Hops, Lana finds that her bicycle Old Red is getting old and plans to obtain a replacement until she finds that it costs $300. After solving a bicycle accident for her friend Flynn, Lana gets money from him and gets an idea to start a mechanic shop. Due to issues with sharing the garage with her family, Lana takes Hops' suggestion to get a garage which leads to Lana getting a garage from Flip who wants for half of the profits. She soon starts taking lessons from Flip. Soon, Flip and Nacho start doing rip off scams much to the dismay of Lana and Hops.
227	25	"Great Lakes Freakout!"	Jessica Borutski & Patrick Pakula	Kevin Sullivan & Alec Schwimmer	Michelle Hiraishi & Yaron Farkash	October 21, 2022	621	0.14
Lori brings Lincoln to Great Lakes City to go trick or treating with Ronnie Anne. Upon arrival, Lincoln learns that the Casagrandes are setting up for Halloween while Frida and Carlitos are visiting Grandpa Danny. In addition, Ernesto Estrella (George Lopez) is going to judge a contest between all the stores on the block against Margarita's Beauty and Hong's Korean Market. After Sergio messes up the decorations, Lincoln has Lori enlist Lucy, Boris, Leni, Lisa, and Lana for help. When Lucy summons the ghost of Buzz only for him to defect to Hong's Korean Market, Carl, Hector, and Bobby use Lucy's spellbook to summon a ghost only for Carl to accidentally summon a hoard of zombies. Now the Loud family and the Casagrande must work to round up the zombies and get rid of them.
228	26	"Snow Escape" "Snow News Day"	Jessica Borutski Patrick Pakula	Andrew Brooks Jeff Sayers	Colton Davis Max Alley	December 20, 2022	623	0.19
On the last day of school before winter break, each of the schools are celebrating holiday parties as Lincoln states that this is the one day nobody wants to miss. Just then, Patchy Drizzle announces that today is packing day due to last night snowstorm's and today's mild temperatures. Because of this, Lynn starts going around pelting her family with snowballs while in beast mode while using the stolen lunches and other food from the refrigerator to refuel. To get to their parties, the Loud kids must work to get to their parties and avoid Lynn's snowball attacks. A strange figure has been seen in the snow at Royal Woods. Zach tells the rest of the Action News about the sighting in which Clyde and Lincoln have seen the same sightings and suspect that it is the Abominable Snowman, causing them to do a Winter Edition of their news. They follow the footprints into Royal Woods Forest and work to draw them out. After Liam gets incapacitated from a giant snowball, the others encounter the Abominable Snowman with Lincoln getting the picture on his phone. When news of the supposed Abominable Snowman reaches Katherine Mulligan, Liam figures out that the Abominable Snowman is actually his missing sheep Roxanne (who was taught to walk on its hind legs and has overgrown wool) as the Action News Team work to find Roxanne before Mr. Bolhofner finds it on Mayor Davis' behalf with Katherine Mulligan filming the hunt for it.
229	27	"Pop Pop the Question" "Lynn and Order"	Jessica Borutski Patrick Pakula	Byron Dockins Whitney Wetta	Anna Hill Kevin Cannarile	December 25, 2022	622	0.28
Pop Pop is planning on proposing to Myrtle. The whole Loud Family is excited by this news at first. But when the Loud kids discover Myrtle having a long line of ex-husbands that have gone missing when they do not know her last name, they think she is a gold digger out to take Pop Pop down once he proposes like the Red Widow character from The Vampires of Melancholia. The kids will have to work together to save Pop Pop and figure out the truth about who Myrtle really is. Principal Ramirez assigns Liam as Lynn's new hall monitor partner, but the two of them have opposing views on how to monitor the halls of Royal Woods Middle School. Lynn is the one who takes action and prosecutes at first chance while Liam wants to know the student's side of the story before jumping to conclusions. Will they be able to work together and keep the halls safe even when Chef Pat's tuna-covered apron is targeted by Mr. Bolhofner's bobcat Rocket?
230	28	"Day of the Dad"	Jessica Borutski	Han-Yee Ling	Michelle Hiraishi	May 8, 2023	624A	0.15
Lori is meeting Arturo Santiago during her meeting with Bobby. She did not meet him the last time the family was at the Casagrades due to her having to use the bathroom and him having to run out to get some masa. When she unknowingly pushes Arturo into a mud puddle while trying to get a cab, Lori recognizes him and disguises herself to avoid his retaliation. After enlisting Margarita for a makeover to disguise herself, Lori later tells Lincoln about her experience. When Arturo wants to spend time with Lori and Bobby again, Lori is given Lisa her memory-erasing device to help out when an accident gives Arturo amnesia.
231	29	"Small Blunder"	Patrick Pakula	Byron Dockins	Yaron Farkash & Trey Chavez	May 9, 2023	624B	0.22
Lily brings her Burp-Me Blarney doll to show and tell at Royal Woods Preschool held by Dr. Shuttleworth. Due to being upstaged by her classmates, Lily plans to be a show and tell star. After failing to get help from Luan and Lincoln, Lily gets inspired by Lisa's shrink ray as Lisa does not want Lily to use it as she is not coordinated enough. After baiting Todd with candy, Lily makes off with the shrink ray and brings it to show and tell. However, the ray is broken and shrinks her classmates. Lily must work to get to the shrink ray and get it working again while dodging the guinea pig Tater Tot.
232	30	"Fashion No Show"	Jessica Borutski	Adeline Colangelo	Anna Grace Hill	May 10, 2023	625A	0.15
Carlota is working for Mariella Moss as an intern, where she makes Carlota the designer for her fashion show. To help her out, Carlota is instructed to hire another intern. She persuades Leni to come to Great Lakes City and intern for Mariella as Carl claims that Leni will outdo her. Once Leni goes to work for Mariella, Carlota states that she will have to work to be fast on her feet. After Leni's first incident, Carlota finds herself being outstaged by Leni as Mariella becomes impressed with Leni's wacky ideals. After Leni is put in charge of the fashion show, Carl persuades Carlota to send Leni on a long errand to the fictional 657th Street so that Carl and Sergio can help out with comical results.
233	31	"Doom Service"	Patrick Pakula	Whitney Wetta	Jared Morgan	May 11, 2023	625B	0.15
At the Royal Woods Mall, the Loud family are looking for a new coffee table after Lana's dogsled team accidentally broke it. They encounter Vic McGillicutty dressed as a palm tree as he offers them a vacation at an all-inclusive resort that has cheap prices. Convinced by his children that they need a vacation, Lynn Sr. signs a piece of paper Vic gives him despite Lisa cautioning him about it. Once there, the Loud family find that Vic is the resort manager as he puts them in Room 237 on the yellow level which is in bad shape. They find that the TV, drawers, lights, and the toilet are coin-operated, doing things yellow level-related, and the paper that Lynn Sr. signed has their visit non-refundable. After Vic thwarts the Loud family's plan to expose his service by giving good treatment to Katherine Mulligan under the alias of "Katie Mulley", the Loud family must find another way to outwit Vic.
234	32	"The Hurt Lockers"	Jessica Borutski	Andrew Brooks	Colton Davis & Yaron Farkash	May 15, 2023	626A	0.21
Following a water safety assembly at Royal Woods Middle School, Principal Ramirez states that a sinkhole had manifested at the school. As a result, some of the students who have their lockers in that area are going to have to share lockers for a while. Lincoln and his friends persuade Ramirez into letting them share lockers. Lincoln shares a locker with Clyde, Rusty shares a locker with Zach, and Liam shares a locker with Stella. Of course tensions start to occur between the friends causing them to try to get new lockers with Lincoln being paired up with Chandler, Zach getting paired up with Lynn, Stella getting paired up with Chef Pat, Rusty getting paired up with Crikey the Kangaroo, Liam getting paired with Jenna, and Clyde getting paired with Andrew.
235	33	"Love Stinks"	Patrick Pakula	Jeff Sayers	Max Alley & Yaron Farkash	May 16, 2023	626B	0.21
One night, Lola finds that Lana had brought home a skunk named Ann from Tall Timbers Park to recuperate from a cold. The next day, Lana is called away to help Liam with his pig's birth and persuades Lola to watch over Ann. She soon warms up to Ann when she turns out to be elegant like her. The next day, Lana wants Lola to release Ann back into the wild. Lola is reluctant to part with Ann and hides her in her locker at Royal Woods Elementary School, where she gets loose. Lola must get to Ann first before Lana and Principal Huggins do.

=== Season 7 (2023–24) ===
No. overall	No. in season	Title	Directed by	Written by	Storyboard by	Original release date	Prod. code	U.S. viewers (millions)
236	1	"Waking History"	Jessica Borutski	Andrew Brooks	Michelle Hiraishi	May 17, 2023	701A	0.14
Lisa sees a news report from Katherine Mulligan where Dr. Alvarez announces that construction workers have found an ancient ice cave and a fully-preserved Neanderthal cavewoman from the Paleolithic era at the sight of the upcoming fusion restaurant Guten Morgen Vietnam. After congratulating Alvarez, Lisa offers to use the reanimator machine only for Alvarez to decline. Going behind Alvarez' back, Lisa returns early the next day where she and Todd reanimate the cavewoman named Frances as Todd translates her language to find out how prehistoric people lived. Frances soon gets free from the museum and goes on a rampage. Now Lisa and Todd must enlist Alvarez for help when Frances mistakes Flip for her prehistoric neighbor who stole her woolly mammoth.
237	2	"Pranks Fore Nothing"	Patrick Pakula	Caitlin Fein	Yaron Farkash	May 18, 2023	701B	0.20
Fairway University is about to engage in a week-long prank war against Brook and Chet from a rival college called Sand Trap University. Whoever wins the prank war must clean the other university's toilets for a month. In order for Fairway University to score victory against Sand Trap University, Lori enlists Luan and Mr. Coconuts to help Lori and her classmates Marisa, Ewan, and Raj with the three types of pranks. After surviving Luan's prank boot camp, Lori, Marisa, Ewan, and Raj are given the final advice that anything can be a prank. After each prank failed, Lori decides to take Luan's advice in order to turn the tide against Brook and Chet
238	3	"Child's Play"	Jessica Borutski	Byron Dockins	Anna Grace Hill	May 22, 2023	702A	0.23
Luna counts the money that is needed for the new speaker system as the Moon Goats have $93.00. Luan collects her kid party payments as Luna states that the Moon Goats should perform for some of Luan's clients. With their first client, they find that they need to make some children songs which turns out to be difficult. The Moon Goats hear Lily singing as they take some inspiration from her for the songs. When Katherine Mulligan approaches them to appear on her TV show "Kat Chat", they accept and want her to perform a new song. With Lily is with her parents at Aunt Ruth's cabin, Luna and the Moon Goats must work to come up with a children song of their own.
239	4	"Force of Habits"	Patrick Pakula	Kevin Sullivan	Lake Fama	May 23, 2023	702B	0.17
Lori has come home for the weekend as she has a dinner date with Bobby. She talks with Leni and Luna, where Leni brings up the annoying habit of Gavin snorting while laughing. While out with Bobby, Lori sees an annoying habit with Bobby breaking into song for no reason and Luna sees an annoying habit with Sam being indecisive in the line for the movie's snack bar. 16 1/2 Magazine gives the advice for Lori, Leni, and Luna to work on getting their dates over their annoying habits. Afterwards, they work on a triple date to Dairyland, where Bobby states that Lori says "literally" all the time, Gavin states that Leni is taking selfies on SwiftyPic, and Sam states that Luna doing a drum solo in line. This causes the triple-date at Dairyland to be affected.
240	5	"Candy Crushed"	Jessica Borutski	Adeline Colangelo	Colton Davis	May 24, 2023	703A	0.20
Following dinner, Lynn Loud Sr. notices that the frosted cinnamon bun cake he made is gone. Lisa calls in Todd to help find it and they discover that Lola has it alongside a bunch of sweets in her room. Rita states to Lola that she has a major sweet tooth problem and will buy her a new pageant dress she's been wanting for a long time if she can go one week without sweets. This means that she will not be able to have French toast with syrup, pancakes a la mode, or cereal. Lola struggles to avoid sweets which include her turning down ice cream from the ice cream man Dalton. On the final day of going without sweets, her biggest challenge comes when Lola's class goes on a field trip to Jack Sweet's Candy Factory.
241	6	"Master of Delusion"	Patrick Pakula	Michelle Hantman	Max Alley	May 25, 2023	703B	0.15
While watching a zombie movie with his friends, Lincoln receives a dove-carried letter from The Amazing Brailster who has chosen him to be his junior illusionist at the club Illusion Chateau. When Lincoln arrives, he meets The Amazing Brailster who shows him around and introduces him to his mongoose Trixie. Before Lincoln can learn magic, The Amazing Brailster puts him through training that involves doing magic chores with comical results. He claims that there is a reason behind these chores as he must "master the basics". Rusty and Zach advise Lincoln to show off a trick to The Amazing Brailster which goes wrong when Trixie escapes while The Amazing Brailster is getting his moustache groomed and his friends disappear looking for her.
242	7	"Road Trip: Bizarritorium"	Jessica Borutski & Patrick Pakula	Byron Dockins & Adeline Colangelo	Anna Grace Hill & Lake Fama	July 14, 2023	705	0.12
Summer has arrived. Just then, Rita arrives in an RV, where she talks about Jesse Hiller tasking her to write their travel column as a travel writer after firing the last person for failing her. After Lana and Lisa upgrade the RV into Camperzilla, the Loud family prepares to head out for a summer-long travel across the United States to follow up on Jesse's schedule. As Niagara Falls is stop number one for the upcoming Barrel Day Competition, Lincoln notices that Dr. Weirdly's Bizarritorium is along the route. Rita will only stop if they have extra time causing Lincoln to pull the stops so that they have plenty of time to stop there. Despite some set-backs, they find that Dr. Weirdly's Bizarritorium is out of business, where Lincoln finds the misplaced Royal Ring of Royalty associated with the Mystic Mummy of Mystery. As the Loud family continues their trip to Niagara Falls, he is unaware of a curse that follows it. When Lucy learns of the curse associated with the Royal Ring of Royalty, she states that they will have to make offerings to the Mystic Mummy of Mystery in order to lift the curse.
243	8	"Road Trip: Bringing Down the House"	Jessica Borutski	Kevin Sullivan	Colton Davis	July 14, 2023	706	0.12
243	8	"Road Trip: Mountain Hard Pass"	Patrick Pakula	Michelle Hantman	Max Alley	July 14, 2023	706	0.12
With Jesse Hiller having advised Rita to forget the scheduled itinerary and head wherever she wants to get interesting stories after having been impressed with Lincoln's mummy curse story, the Loud family arrive in Washington, D.C., where they have been procured VIP passes to the White House. Upon their arrival, they meet the White House tour guide Bosley Bullsworth (Mark DeCarlo) who does not want them to wreck anything during the birthday of the President of the United States or else they'll end up in the White House Dungeon. The Loud children secretly divert from the tour to see the different places. Once the tour is over, Rita learns that Lynn Sr. and the kids accidentally break and they must fix everything before Bullsworth finds out. The Loud family arrive in Colorado to enjoy the beauty of the Rocky Mountains. Rita and Lynn Sr. plan to take a 10 mile hike as they want to go on a hike like they used to. Things become worse when they deal with temperature changes as the Loud children try to get the hike cancelled. Lynn Sr. and Rita are not deterred as Lynn Sr. states that they can live off the land by harvesting huckleberries, making a natural cure for poison oak. They soon have to contend with mountain goats, a rickety bridge, and losing the map. After getting lost, they must find their way back to Camperzilla using whatever nature provides.
244	9	"Road Trip: From Brad to Worse"	Jessica Borutski	Andrew Brooks	Michelle Hiraishi	July 14, 2023	707	0.12
244	9	"Road Trip: Doll Day Afternoon"	Patrick Pakula	Caitlin Fein	Yaron Farkash, Jacqueleen Munoz & Mishelle Kim	July 14, 2023	707	0.12
The Loud family arrives at the South West State Fair somewhere in the Southwestern United States. They run into Rita's old boyfriend Brad Plaid (Eric Morgan Stuart) from Camp Can-Do who is a country singer. As Lynn Sr. gets jealous, he finds Brad has invited them to his concert following the rodeo. After finding that all of Brad's songs is about Rita, Lynn Sr. works to outdo Brad at everything with comical results. After Lincoln finds out that Brad is supposedly trying to steal Rita, he helps Lynn Sr. pass the rodeo by replacing his horse with Stomper the Bull. After finishing her article on the Raddest Diners on U.S. Route 66, it is soon discovered that Luan does not have Mr. Coconuts with her. She convinces the rest of the family to look for Mr. Coconuts. Their first stop is the Greasy Spoon, where Lisa and Luan persuade the waitress to access the security cameras, where they find him being taken by a man in a car with a bumper sticker stating "Dust is the Must" which is the motto of Dusty Town. They follow the culprit all along Route 66 to rescue Mr. Coconuts as they follow the culprit to different areas. Nothing can prepare the Loud family for what happens when they catch up to the culprit and learn his identity.
245	10	"Road Trip: Screen Queen"	Jessica Borutski	Byron Dockins	Anna Grace Hill	July 14, 2023	708	0.12
245	10	"Road Trip: Hide and Sneak"	Patrick Pakula	Adeline Colangelo	Lake Fama	July 14, 2023	708	0.12
In Hollywood, Los Angeles, the Loud family have completed a studio tour at Tip Top Studios. Lola finds that Tip Top Studio is filming a Dakota Rhoda film directed by Nora Nussebaum (Karen Maruyama). Because the last person who portrayed Dakota Rhoda has turned 42, Lola plans to audition for the movie. Lola plans to get the buzz about her in Hollywood as Lynn Sr. and Rita claim that being a movie star is not all that it is cracked up to be. The family helps Lola out in her plan in front of Nora Nussebaum. Once that is done, Lola learns that Nora had the previous Dakota Rhoda do her own stunts and that Nora will release Lola from the contract when she is 42. Arriving in Great Lakes City, Rita considers this their last trip as she does not want the family to interact with the Casagrande family as her last travel article is due tonight. Their first stop is the Goddess Green restaurant as Leni mentions that Carlota comes here on occasion causing them to sneak out when Carlota comes in. The next stop at Great Lake City Tower, where they see a great view until Carl, Sergio, and the pigeons arrive causing them to escape down the window washer platform. The third stop is the Great Lakes City Jazz Festival in the park as the entire family is present. Now they must work to avoid the Casagrande family so that Rita can make her deadline.
246	11	"Out of Step"	Jessica Borutski	Kevin Sullivan	Colton Davis	September 5, 2023	709	0.15
246	11	"Too Cool for School"	Patrick Pakula	Erik Steinman	Max Alley & Mishelle Kim	September 5, 2023	709	0.15
At Sunset Canyon Retirement Home, Clyde and Nana Gayle partake in the Grandma & Grandson Dance Contest against Lincoln and Myrtle and Scoots and a sack of potatoes. Clyde and Nana Gayle win the semi-finals and will represent Sunset Canyon at the City Finals against Twilight Towers Retirement Home for the prize of the massage chairs. The Twilight Towers Retirement Home's representatives are Chandler and Gran McCann with Chandler claiming that he is always on his best behavior with his grandmother. On the dance finals hosted by Mrs. Bernardo, Clyde and Nana Gayle struggle to get through Chandler's secret sabotage. As Lincoln is familiar with the obstacles of Royal Woods Middle School, he and his friends are unprepared when Principal Ramirez implements some changes after she had met known leading education expert Astrid Bjorklundson from Sweden. These changes involve students arriving earlier for a yoga session, the school being made cold, and fish being served while eating it during gym. With Meryl displeased that she cannot leave her desk for a bathroom break during administrative work, Lincoln and his friends work to get their school back to normal that involves Stella posing as Astrid Bjorklenson.
247	12	"Music to My Fears"	Jessica Borutski	Michelle Hantman	Michelle Hiraishi	September 6, 2023	710	0.11
247	12	"Fluff and Foiled"	Patrick Pakula	Andrew Brooks	Yaron Farkash	September 6, 2023	710	0.11
The Moon Goats arrive at the Loud House where Luna has been put on shred rest and voice rest after last night's gig for the rest of the gig. At the Cherry Pit Spit, they need to find someone to cover for Luna. Luna meets a guitarist named Nina who asks her to audition for the part. Luan hears about it and claims that she was replaced in Mrs. Bernardo's production of "Little Shop of Snorers". With Mr. Coconuts having made Luna worry, Luan plans to sabotage Nina's audition. Lincoln is psyched for Dairyland's Udder Day Madness which has a legendary prize. Unfortunately, Lynn Sr. and Rita tell him that it is his turn to do the laundry and Lisa mentions to Lincoln that his sisters have already covered for him five times. In order to get to Udder Day Madness, Lincoln gets all the laundry in the washing machine and accidentally breaks it. He enlists Clyde's help as they attempt to use the laundromat during senior day. When that fails, Lincoln tries to improvise the laundry work at Dairyland with comical results.
248	13	"Tough Guise"	Jessica Borutski	Andrew Brooks	Michelle Hiraishi	September 7, 2023	704B	0.15
As the Action News Team reads the complaints about Rusty's ab feature, Zach's alien detector goes off where it causes him to suspect that Mr. Bolhofner is an alien....until it was discovered that his alien detector was low on batteries. This causes Bolhofner to give Zach two days detention. After Rusty helps Zach prepare for middle school detention, he goes to detention at Bolhofner's class trailer where Anderson, Taylor, and Pablo are in attendance and Rocket guards them while Bolhofner goes for a swim. After making through the first day, the second day leaves Zach deciding his next course of action when Anderson, Taylor, and Pablo drag him into sneaking out and booby-trapping the teacher's lounge in order to get revenge on the teacher that gave them detention.
249	14	"Leave No Van Behind"	Jessica Borutski	Byron Dockins	Anna Grace Hill	September 11, 2023	711A	0.13
Vanzilla has broken down during the car wash as Lana and Lynn Sr. are badly affected by this. Rita suggests that they get rid of Vanzilla as Lana and Lynn Sr. persuade her to give them a weekend to revive Vanzilla. Leonard is called in to help fix Vanzilla and get to the source of how it broken down. They think it is the pistons as it goes up and down a hill to no avail. Then they try to recharge electricity which does not work. Lynn Sr., Lana, and Leonard find a left crank cylinder gasket for the Fungo van that Vanzilla is. Thanks to a tip from Flip, they head to the abandoned Fungo factory, where they must convince its creator Freddy Fungo (Frank Collison) to help them out.
250	15	"Sponsor Tripped"	Patrick Pakula	Adeline Colangelo	Lake Fama	September 12, 2023	711B	0.13
Following a soccer victory by Lynn's team coached by Coach Keck, Lynn is approached by Andre who congratulates her and offers her a sponsorship where she will get VIP treatment from the Burpin' Burger. He also advises Lynn that they should have different sponsors throughout Royal Woods for her teammates. Margo gets sponsorship from Flip's Food & Fuel, Maddie gets sponsorship from Gus's Games & Grubs, Paula gets sponsorship from Duds for Dudes, and Carla gets sponsorship from Dairyland. Everything goes well until the championship against the Hazeltucky, where the sponsors have their sponsorship perks upgraded.
251	16	"Party Fowl"	Jessica Borutski	Kevin Sullivan	Colton Davis	September 13, 2023	712A	0.20
Rosa and Carl leave Sergio at the Loud House for the Loud family to babysit him so that he will not ruin another one of Carlos' lectures. If he misbehaves, Rosa will send Sergio to bird boot camp. To keep up his party plans, Sergio lies to Charles, Cliff, Geo, and Walt about the party location while he parties with Sergio and the pigeons at Tall Timbers Park. When the after-party promised by Sancho occurs at the Loud House against Sergio's orders, Sergio must beg for forgiveness from Charles, Cliff, Geo, and Walt in order to get Sancho and his fellow pigeons out of the Loud House before the rest of the Loud family wakes up.
252	17	"Sleepless in Royal Woods"	Patrick Pakula	Whitney Wetta	Max Alley	September 14, 2023	712B	0.13
As most of the Loud family is asleep at 3:00 AM, Rita tries to get Lily to sleep after Lynn Sr. accidentally gave her an espresso bean before bed. While driving around in order to get Lily to fall asleep, Rita and Lily see a break-in at Jean-Juan's French-Mex Buffet. As a 911 call about a break-in has Officer Shirley dismissing the information due to having dealt with tired moms at 4:00 AM before, Rita and Lily follow the trail of the thief. They follow different clues as they trail the thief from a farm to Dairyland, where they end up being chased by the thief.
253	18	"Bye Bye Birthday"	Patrick Pakula	Caitlin Fein	Yaron Farkash	September 28, 2023 (Note: This episode aired early on Nicktoons on September 18, 2023.)	704A	0.09
253	18	"Bye Bye Birthday"	Patrick Pakula	Caitlin Fein	Yaron Farkash	September 28, 2023	704A	0.15
At the Royal Woods Cemetery, the Morticians Club try a trip to the Underworld as Bertrand's spells have been rusty since he got back from the S.S. Funtime cruise. Lucy tells the Morticians Club that her 9th birthday is tomorrow and is subjected to the same traditions. Bertrand finds a birthday be-gone spell that involves getting the family involved in a sunset dinner/poetry slam. Despite some setbacks, the spell appears to work the next day. Lucy starts to remember the positive points of her birthday and enlists the Morticians Club to find a way to cast the birthday be-back spell by sunset.
254	19	"Twas the Fight Before Christmas"	Jessica Borutski & Patrick Pakula	Andrew Brooks & Byron Dockins	Anna Grace Hill & Tom Kanter	December 1, 2023	717	0.13
It is the Christmas season as Lynn Sr. fakes a back injury. Lincoln explains about how some Christmases ago when Lynn Sr. had a falling out with Uncle Lance (Rob Riggle) during a game of White Elephant that involved the accidental destruction of Uncle Lance's Ab Blaster exercise ball when he claimed the spatula that Lynn Sr. obtained. Lincoln tells his sisters his plans to get his father and uncle back together since Leonard is back in their lives. In Petoskey Falls, Michigan, Uncle Lance fakes a foot injury to avoid visiting Lynn Sr. in front of his wife Sharon (Ozioma Akagha) as their children Shane, Shelby, and Shiloh are contacted by Lincoln. This leads to a Christmas gathering at Camp Mastodon with Leonard's help as Lincoln, his sisters, and his cousins work to get Lynn Sr. and Uncle Lance in the holiday spirit. Things go well after the Christmas tree picking until Uncle Lance uses Lynn Sr.'s spatula to take out a spider and Lynn Sr. destroys Uncle Lance's Ab Blaster in retaliation. When Lincoln, Lori, and Shelby end up in danger trying to get replacements when en route to the Masto-Mart, Lynn Sr. and Uncle Lance must put aside their differences to rescue them.
255	20	"Hunn-cutt Gems"	Jessica Borutski	Michelle Hantman	Michelle Hiraishi	January 16, 2024	713A	0.12
At Royal Woods Middle School, Rusty shows the news about Chef Pat presenting a birthday cake for Crikey the Kangaroo until he interrupts Crikey by having one bite of the cake. Liam is instructed by Lincoln to stall as he shows footage of him and Meemaw doing stuff around the farm. The next day, the Action News Team get mail from the students about how they liked Liam's work on the farm. As Rusty needs time to recover, Liam starts a segment revolved around his family's farm. Soon, everyone wants to see more of the Hunnicutt farm until it is overshadowed by videos involving Chef Pat helping Crikey with his beef-boxing training causing Liam to come up with ways to outdo them.
256	21	"Can't Lynn 'Em All" "Can't Lynn Them All"	Patrick Pakula	Jeff Sayers	Yaron Farkash	January 17, 2024	713B	0.11
At the Royal Woods Sports Arena, Lynn and Lincoln watch the Meat Mountain fight the Hungry Hungry Herbivore in a wrestling match. After Meat Mountain calls the audience a chicken, Lynn enters the ring and beats up Meat Mountain. Afterwards, she is approached by wrestling promoter Bella "Big" Bucks (June Diane Raphael) of Motor City Wrestling who wants her to be her next star wrestler. With help from Leni and Lincoln, Lynn becomes the Brawl Monitor as she fights opponents like Creeps the Clown, Cat Burglar, and Tippy the Cow (who Lynn could not throw the match against). With Lynn being considered a villain, Bella "Big" Bucks has her fight the good wrestlers like Widdle Baby, Ice Cream Man, and Sweet Old Granny. To get out of wrestling upon being disliked, Lynn plans to get out of wrestling by throwing the match against Santa Claus.
257	22	"Bye, Tanya"	Jessica Borutski	Andrew Brooks	Anna Grace Hill	January 18, 2024	714A	0.12
At Reininger's, Leni brings fuffins (short for "fun muffins") to Fiona and Miguel. Ms. Carmichael does a pre-opening announcement, where she is going to give Reininger's an update starting with retiring the mannequins. Though Tanya is among the mannequins that will be removed as Leni is too attached to it. Leni ropes Fiona and Miguel into saving Tanya before she is taken away by the movers Pauly and Tony. Due to Ms. Carmichael locking the front of Reininger's, Leni, Fiona, and Miguel work to hide Tanya from the movers. When Leni unknowingly puts Tanya in the driver's seat of the movers' car, Leni, Fiona, and Miguel must get Tanya out of storage before she is recycled and back to Reininger's before Ms. Carmichael returns.
258	23	"What Lies Beneath"	Patrick Pakula	Byron Dockins	Lake Fama	January 22, 2024	714B	0.14
At the Royal Woods Cemetery, Dante buries something under a tombstone marked "unknown". After the Morticians' Club help the cemetery groundskeeper Hank, Boris finds the "unknown" tombstone by accident. The rest of the Morticians Club holds a seance to find out who is buried under the tombstone as Dante tries to talk them out of it to no avail. Dante and his cat Virgil pull off tricks to throw them off like pretending to be a ghost named "Ernie Shovelgate", breaking items at The Cheaper Reaper, and trying to drive away Hank from the tombstone during his lunch break.
259	24	"An Inspector Falls"	Jessica Borutski	Adeline Colangelo	Colton Davis	January 23, 2024	715A	0.19
At Royal Woods High School, Mrs. Bernardo reveals the cast of the upcoming play "The Case of the Missing Corgi" where Luan has been cast as Agatha Mystery, Benny has been cast as the corgi, Amy has been cast as Agatha Mystery's sidekick Gretchen, and Shannon has been cast as the mulberry bush. During the first rehearsal, a sandbag drops and it is suspected that somebody sabotages it. Luan, Benny, and Amy work to solve the mystery on who is sabotaging the set of "The Case of the Missing Corgi". The suspects are Ed the Janitor, Shannon, and Lyberti. Even when Rex comes clean about the rope, Luan suspects that there is more to the sabotage than anyone suspects.
260	25	"One in a Million"	Patrick Pakula	Kevin Sullivan	Max Alley	January 24, 2024	715B	0.10
Lincoln and Clyde have packed up the Loud House's groceries as part of Flip's contest to obtain his 1,000,000th customer, where the winner will take as many items as they can in 30 seconds. With their tracker at 999,920, they work to wait for 80 more customers to go in which is hard due to it being slow. Lincoln and Clyde take matters into their own hands by doing things like sign-spinning and bringing elderly people to Flip's to draw in customers. When Lincoln and Clyde get the tracker up to 999,999, they soon end up competing with Chandler to be the 1,000,000th customer.
261	26	"Dread of the Class"	Jessica Borutski	Whitney Wetta	Michelle Hiraishi	January 25, 2024	716A	0.13
At the Loud House, Luan's Pranking Academy is undergoing a pranking graduation for Ronnie Anne with Lincoln and Benny in attendance. Upon receiving a diploma, Ronnie Anne finds that it was made with disappearing ink as she must take on one final test. She must work to prank Luan before sundown and to work with what she's got. Ronnie Anne ropes Lincoln into helping her pull off the prank. She tries things that do not go well like a chili bean shower, putting an airbag underneath the funniest booth at Lynn's Table, setting up clear wrap on the road, and sabotaging the stilts at a birthday party in Tall Timbers Park. As sunset is approaching, Ronnie Anne must find Luan in the Hunnicutt family's Maze of Corn-Fusion and prank her before the sun is finished setting.
262	27	"Welcome to the Doll Heist"	Patrick Pakula	Michelle Hantman	Yaron Farkash	June 3, 2024	716B	0.12
At the Loud House, Lily is having a playdate with Ingrid who has brought over a plush narwhal named Nugget who can do backflips. Impressed by it, Lily wants to have a trade with Ingrid as Ingrid lays her eyes on Lola's plush unicorn Eunice. When Ingrid is taken home by her mother Candace, Lily finds that Ingrid has taken Eunice. When encountering Eunice at the Super Mart, Lily wants to trade Nugget back to Ingrid who does not want to part with Eunice (who Ingrid renamed "Princess Cotton Candy"). Not wanting to feel the wrath of Lola when she finds Eunice gone, Lily enlists Lincoln, Lisa, Luan, Lynn, and Lana to reclaim Eunice before Lola gets home.
263	28	"Let's Break a Deal"	Jessica Borutski & Colton Davis	Adeline Colangelo	Colton Davis	June 3, 2024	718A	0.12
At Gus' Games & Grub, Rusty watches Morpheus perform a spell to get pizza. He makes a deal with Morpheus to help him win Dance Battle in exchange for a price off from Duds for Dudes. Once that is done, Rusty becomes impressed with Morpheus' spells as Morpheus will grant Rusty some spells in exchange for a favor at night. He starts with asking Morpheus to give him a moustache. Then Morpheus casts a spell that attracts everyone to Duds for Dude. Rusty then asks Morpheus to get him a date with Amber from Hazeltucky who will want Rusty to meet with Gus' Games and Grub at night. Rusty must give up some of his hair for one of Morpheus' spell, which Rusty is unable to do, causing Morpheus to conduct some magical retaliation until Rusty agrees to give him his hair.
264	29	"A Dish Come True"	Patrick Pakula	Kevin Sullivan	Max Alley	June 4, 2024	718B	0.09
At Lynn's Table, Lincoln and Clyde arrive to have some snacks there. Lincoln holds the first ever Lynn's Table Employee of the Month contest, where the winner will get a dish named after them. Wanting a dish named after him, Lincoln persuades his dad to let him work at Lynn's Table. Kotaro and Grant start to get jealous at Lincoln's progress at Lynn's Table. Later that night, Lana overhears his call with Clyde about a dish named after him causing Luna, Luan, Lynn, and Lana to compete with Lincoln to get a dish named after them which makes Kotaro and Grant even more jealous and causing the competition to become fierce.
265	30	"Beg, Borrow and Steele"	Jessica Borutski	Caitlin Fein	Michelle Hiraishi	June 4, 2024	719A	0.09
On Allowance Day, Lincoln visits the Royal Woods Comic Book Nook to get a David Steele Mystery Box as its cashier Kara (Scarlett Estevez) states that nobody has found the one that has the Stainless Steele box. When Lincoln gets a David Steele Mystery Box and does not find it, he does not have enough money to get another one as Kara suggests borrowing money from a kingpin. The only kingpin he knows is Lola as she lends him some money. When he finally gets the Stainless Steele figure, he ends up in debt with Lola and has to work it off by doing different things for him which keeps going comically awry and raising the debt. This causes Lincoln to beg for help in getting out of his debt from Leni, Lynn, Lucy, Lisa, and Lily which only makes things worse for him.
266	31	"There Will Be Mud"	Patrick Pakula	Jeff Sayers	Yaron Farkash	June 5, 2024	719B	0.05
At the Hunnicut Farm, Liam is visited by Lincoln and Clyde as he and his Mee-Maw Mimi set up their farm stand. Mimi ends up striking oil during a fight with the gophers. As a result, Liam and Mimi sell the Hunnicut Farm as they and their farm animals move into their manor at Huntington Oaks. Their antics annoy Reginald Robertson Riley III and the other neighbors. Mimi plans to find a way to get along with their neighbors so that they act fancy. Liam and Mimi get fancy lessons from Clyde, Howard, and Harold. Because they have a lot to cover, Howard and Harold continue teaching them when Mimi invites the neighbors over for a party as Liam and Mimi struggle to act fancy.
267	32	"Riddle School"	Jessica Borutski	Andrew Brooks	Anna Grace Hill	June 5, 2024	720A	0.05
At Royal Woods Middle School, Lincoln tells the viewers about Spaghetti Day as everyone is in line for it. He, Clyde, Liam, Rusty, Zach, and Stella have signed up for a class called EAT. When Lincoln and his friends finally get their spaghetti, they end up finding out that the spaghetti that everyone was given was spiked with hot sauce. Lincoln's group finds a letter for the Action News Team from the Swindler, where they must solve the Swindler's puzzles. Once they get through more clues, they must put the letters together and find the Swindler before the "big one" is unleashed.
268	33	"Love Me Tenor"	Patrick Pakula	Byron Dockins	Lake Fama	June 6, 2024	720B	0.08
As Lincoln, Clyde, Liam, Rusty, Zach, and Stella are walking home from Gus' Games & Grub, they double back when Liam misplaces his retrainer. Upon arrival, they discover that Gus is good at singing opera. While he dreamed of singing on stage, Gus is too shy to sing on other people and only cuts loose when he's alone. This gives Lincoln an idea to help get over his shyness. They start by having Gus sing in front of an audience of plush toys. Then Gus tries his performance at Jean Juan's French Mex Buffet's open mic night hosted by Tyler which he gets help from Lincoln and Stella. With Liam's retainer still missing, Lincoln and his friend find that Gus has turned Gus' Games & Grub into Augusto's Opera & Antipasto which they have a hard time getting used to.

=== Season 8 (2024–25) ===
No. overall	No. in season	Title	Directed by	Written by	Storyboard by	Original release date	Prod. code	U.S. viewers (millions)
269	1	"Homeward Bound"	Jessica Borutski	Adeline Colangelo	Colton Davis	June 10, 2024	801A	N/A
Lori is coming home during a gap year so that she can decide if golf is her future. When Lori arrives home, she informs her family that she'll be staying home temporary and is going to find a realtor to find her the right apartment. Lincoln ropes the rest of his sisters to find a way to get Lori to stay. He gets Luan to pose as a realtor named Sunny Homes to show her the worst apartments like Chunk's van, Scoots' room at Sunset Canyon Retirement Home, a crypt in Royal Woods Cemetery, and the garbage dump. Lori finds living at home difficult as Leni ends up making Lori late for her job interview at the Burnt Bean by turning off her alarm clock.
270	2	"Pressure Cooker"	Patrick Pakula	Kevin Sullivan	Max Alley	June 11, 2024	801B	0.07
During the monthly potluck at Sunset Canyon Retirement, Lincoln finds that Pop-Pop, Scoots, Albert, and Seymour have been waiting for the desserts that Clyde and Nana Gayle have made. Inspired by Pop-Pop and his friends, Clyde and Nana Gayle plan to share their food as Tyler suggests that they start a food truck. Bernie procures the old Sunset Canyon bus called the Wrinkly Rider. With help from the Loud family and Clyde's dads, the Wrinkly Rider bus is refurbished as Lynn Sr. gives advice on running a food truck. When preparing for it, Clyde and Nana Gayle are not in sync when they each want to make different desserts much to the dismay of Clyde's dads.
271	3	"Steeling Thunder"	Jessica Borutski	Whitney Wetta	Michelle Hiraishi	June 12, 2024	802A	0.10
Lincoln and Clyde work on a David Steele film where he fights Octoflippee (portrayed by Flip). When a filming part puts Lincoln in danger, he is saved by Lynn. Getting an idea, Lincoln enlists Lynn to be his stunt double in exchange for doing her homework. At the Royal Woods Middle School's film festival hosted by Girl Jordan, "Steeling Thunder" is aired and becomes a winner much to the dismay of Chandler. He is unable to tell the truth that Lynn did all the stunts as he persuades Clyde to let it drag out for a while with even Mr. Bolhofner and Coach Keck being impressed with it. Though Chandler figures out the truth and plans to prove to the school that Lincoln was lying.
272	4	"Be Careful What You Fish For"	Patrick Pakula	Jeff Sayers	Yaron Farkash	June 13, 2024	802B	0.09
Lincoln and Lynn Sr. meet up with Gramps, Uncle Lance, and Shiloh for a family fishing trip on a lake. During the family fishing trip, Gramps feels pain in his right foot when it senses the arrival of the great white sturgeon Moby Rick who wrecked the ship that Gramps was on 30 years ago and lost the big toe on his right foot. This leads to them assisting Gramps in hunting Moby Rick, where they discover that Moby Rick loves the Lynn-sagna that Lynn Sr. made. This leads them to chasing Moby Rick to Dead Man's Cove, where Gramps goes after Moby Rick alone as Lincoln, Lynn Sr., Lance, and Shiloh try to go after him.
273	5	"Only Mime Will Tell"	Jessica Borutski & Anna Grace Hill	Andrew Brooks	Anna Grace Hill	June 17, 2024	803A	N/A
At Royal Woods High School, Mrs. Bernardo is teaching a mime class and training the students for the varsity mime tryouts. Whoever wins will win a beret to show that they are the best of the best. Her students complete in a mime obstacle course. The next challenge is for the students to remain silent for a day. Luan struggles to speak in mime when she is unable to warn Lynn Sr. about an escaped lobster, has her ponytail tampered by Lola, having to spot Lynn, and becoming Lisa's test subject. When Luan hears from Lynn Sr.'s phone message from his fishing contact Deb that the lobsters she caught has gone bad, Luan has to make her way over to Lynn's Table while staying silent throughout to prevent the bad lobsters from being sold and eaten.
274	6	"The Winning Spirit"	Patrick Pakula	Byron Dockins	Lake Fama	June 18, 2024	803B	N/A
At Royal Woods Elementary School, Lucy has been struggling at different sporting activities that Coach Pacowski has been putting her through. After failing the obstacle course, Lucy is told by Coach Pacowski that she will have one more chance to pass or else she will not pass the fourth grade. In order to pass the obstacle course, Lucy enlists the Morticians Club for help. They come up with different spells like enchanting some running shoes, aging her, and spiking Coach Pacowski's coffee with Memory-Be-Gone. The latest attempt is to head to the cemetery and summon the Ghost of Speedy Edie to possess Lucy.
275	7	"InTODDnito"	Jessica Borutski	Adeline Colangelo	Colton Davis	June 19, 2024	804A	N/A
At Royal Woods Elementary School, Lisa has finished an experimental safety salve with Petey Whimple. Darcy Helmandollar approaches Lisa, where she invites her to her birthday party as they are besties. Later that night, Lisa learns from Todd that Dr. Julius Brown is being honored at the Royal Woods Medical Center. She gets the idea to have Todd pose as her by transplanting his head to a smaller body with a cloned voice while advising him not to lose his disguise. To be safe, Lisa will monitor with her tablet. Though things get worse when Flip in his Ulysses' Unicorns and Unitards business complicates Lisa's plans.
276	8	"Weather or Not"	Patrick Pakula	Kevin Sullivan	Max Alley	June 20, 2024	804B	N/A
At Flip's Food & Fuel, Flip asks Nacho on where they should go on vacation. When Lincoln and Clyde enter Flip's Food & Fuel, Nacho suddenly senses a change in the weather, revealing that Nacho has the secret talent of telling what the weather is. When Lincoln and Clyde ask Nacho a second opinion on the trip to the Royal Woods Tar Pits, Flip begins his next business venture called Flip's Food & Forkast. After overhearing Lori's comment about Patchy Drizzle making an inaccurate forecast, Flip has Nacho take Patchy Drizzle's place and then hires Patchy to work at Flip's Food & Fuel upon feeling sorry for him. Soon, Flip donates Nacho to Newark as he starts to miss him.
277	9	"Close Encounters of the Nerd Kind"	Jessica Borutski & Patrick Pakula	Whitney Wetta & Jeff Sayers	Michelle Hiraishi & Tom Kanter	October 23, 2024	TBA	N/A
277	9	"Close Encounters of the Nerd Kind"	Jessica Borutski & Patrick Pakula	Andrew Brooks & Byron Dockins	Anna Grace Hill & Jules Bridgers	October 23, 2024	TBA	N/A
In this show's second one-hour episode that takes place on Halloween, Lincoln, Clyde, Liam, Rusty, Zach, and Stella have become fans of the film Planet Protection Patrol. Lincoln is going as Commander Rick Fox, Clyde is going as Dr. Thelonius Mucus, Liam is going as Trunk, Rusty is going as Deputy Dream Dude, Zach is going as Lieutenant Blorb, and Stella is going as Tech Sergeant Cronk as they go trick-or-treating with Lynn claiming that they will be targets for bullies. At the same time, the Loud family set up their haunted house for visitors of their house as they try to make it scary as Lincoln claims that they've been doing the same thing every year. While trick-or-treating, they are briefly ambushed by Chandler and Trent who mess with the space communicator made from a hand mixer. When they arrive at Cheryl and Meryl's house, they find that they are not home and slime is nearby. Then they head to Flip's Food & Fuel, where they find Flip missing. On their way back to the Loud House, Lincoln and his friends learn from Trent that Chandler has gone missing as Mrs. Bernardo promotes her one-woman show at the Royal Woods Cemetery. With Trent and the Loud family go missing, Lincoln and his friends discover that actual aliens have arrived in Royal Woods. As Officer Schoffner (who is dressed as Corporal Kweeb as she is also a fan of Planet Protection Patrol) and an unnamed police officer do not believe them, they must rescue the missing people from the UFO of the yellow slimy aliens before they leave the Solar System.
278	10	"Kara-less Whisper"	Jessica Borutski	Whitney Wetta	Michelle Hiraishi	November 12, 2024	808	N/A
278	10	"Dollars and Scents"	Patrick Pakula	Jeff Sayers	Yaron Farkash	November 12, 2024	808	N/A
At Royal Woods Middle School, Lincoln, Clyde, Liam, Rusty, Zach, and Stella are having lunch while talking about issue #13 of the David Steele comics which is somewhere in Royal Woods and that somewhere is Comic Book Nook. Since Kara works at Comic Book Nook and she is a student at Royal Woods Middle School, Rusty and Zach suggest that they kiss up to her so that they can see the comic. That attempt failed and caused a nearby Mr. Bolhofner to thank them for cover story in the school newspaper. This causes them to use their Action News Team privileges to do a story on the Comic Book Nook in order to get close to David Steele #13. At Reininger's, Miguel compliments Fiona's bottle display as he talks about selling his own perfume ever since Ms. Carmichael had him work in the perfume section. After a failed promotion of his perfume Swell with Lola, Mr. Grouse, Cheryl, and Meryl, Miguel tells Leni about his perfume sale. He ropes Leni into making perfume that has the same cosmetic smell she had yesterday. When they make the perfume from Leni's memory, the final ingredient is Leni's sweat. Their perfume Lenergy becomes a big hit which impresses Ms. Carmichael who wants 10,000 bottles by the end of the week. Leni's workout day produces sweat for 5,000 bottles as he works to make Leni secretly sweat out enough to complete the order for Ms. Carmichael.
279	11	"Bulking and Sulking"	Jessica Borutski	Andrew Brooks	Anna Grace Hill	November 13, 2024	809A	N/A
At Lynn's Table, Lynn Sr, Lincoln, Luan, and Lynn are covering for Kotaro and Grant who are away at Camp Crease. Lance pays a visit, where he is looking for a location for his Endure-Lance Gym franchise. Lynn Sr. gets the idea to have Lance use the storage room in the attic. On opening day, Lance's workout causes trouble for Lynn Sr. in the kitchen. During the busiest time of the day, Lance's activity blocks the parking lot. It soon becomes too hard for Lynn Sr. to handle, causing Lincoln to think of a way to get Lance to move out.
280	12	"Wild Goss Chase"	Patrick Pakula	Byron Dockins	Lake Fama	November 14, 2024	809B	N/A
At Royal Woods Elementary School, Jesse Hiller's niece Jamie tells Petey Wimple and Ashley that the school newspaper is in trouble because of low readership. What it needs is gritty news stories to attract new readers. Hearing Lola talking different gossip, Jamie recruits Lola to the school newspaper when told that she would get her picture in the paper. Lola starts to write a gossip column while not letting anyone get suspicious of her. She gets her first story by exposing Mrs. Johnson as the one whose been airhorn pranking Principal Huggins. Then she does other gossips like Kayla eating a booger, Coach Pacowski struggling with his paddle swinging, and Winston ripping his pants on the slide exposing his Blarney underpants as Lola will soon see the negative aspects of her gossip column.
281	13	"The Weakest Ink"	Jessica Borutski	Adeline Colangelo	Colton Davis	November 18, 2024	810A	N/A
As the Moon Goats prepare for the Beats n' the Heat Festival hosted by Mayor Davis, Sam gets a notification that their video for their song "Play For My Band" has gotten 100,000 viewers. To celebrate this, they go with their pinky promise to each get matching small wrist tattoos at the Tat Shack. As Luna books an appointment at 4:00 for the Moon Goats, she runs into Chunk who got his latest tattoo as he tells her about the experience of when he got his tattoos which is painful at first. With her fellow Moon Goats having gotten approval, Luna is weary of it causing Lincoln, Lynn, Lucy, Lana, and Leni to help her find a way to endure the pain that comes with receiving her tattoo.
282	14	"Sales Forced"	Patrick Pakula	Michelle Hantman	Max Alley	November 19, 2024	810B	N/A
At Royal Woods Elementary School, Miss Allegra reveals to the school's science club that they will be selling scented candles in order to raise money to obtain a high-powered telescope called the Galacta-Tron 3000. Lisa does a terrible job selling her candles. Lincoln learns of her plight and enlists Leni and Lola to help Lisa learn how to be a better salesperson. Lincoln enlists Leni and Lola to help give Lisa their advice on how she can be a better salesperson complete with Leni doing some adjustments to one of Lincoln's convincing suits. After an attempt with Cheryl fails, Lisa uses the Brain Lobe Enhancement Helmet to expand the salesmanship section of the brain and enlarge it, where she sells her candles to everyone and soon gets hooked on salesmanship much to the dismay of Todd.
283	15	"Trouble Brewing"	Jessica Borutski	Adeline Colangelo	Colton Davis	November 20, 2024	813A	N/A
Late one night, Lynn Sr. and Rita are awoken by a sound coming from the kitchen. Even the kids are awoken as Lincoln reveals that he set up a trap. They discover that Lori is responsible and did not want to worry anyone while mentioning that she is broke after paying Mr. Grouse her rent and has not been having any luck getting a job. Luan mentions that she's been working part time at The Burnt Bean and heard that they are looking for a new "bean-rista". With Luan's help, Lori is hired by The Burnt Bean's manager Beany Brewinski a few days later. During her first day, Lori, Luan, and Paraag learn from Beany that she will be at a conference in Beantown and placed her top "bean-rista" Luan in charge. Lori struggles to handle the ways of The Burnt Bean employee which starts to put her at odds with Luan with disastrous and comical results.
284	16	"The Cling and I"	Patrick Pakula	Michelle Hantman	Max Alley	November 21, 2024	813B	N/A
While having breakfast, Lily sees Lana store food in her hat for Charles. She begins to gather some local breakfast foods and feed Charles too. She then joins Lana in giving Vanzilla a paint job, adding a roof to Lana's mud masterpiece, and joining Lana in going potty as Rita notes that Lana has become Lily's favorite. Lana tells Hops that being with Lily is too much. She takes Hops' suggestion to find someone else for Lily to play with. Lana attempts to have Lily play with Leni and Lynn with comical results. When Lily starts bonding with Lola, Lana begins to regret letting Lily hand with Lola as they work on fixing it to no avail.
285	17	"Europe Road Trip: A Knight to Remember"	Jessica Borutski & Patrick Pakula	Whitney Wetta & Jeff Sayers	Michelle Hiraishi & Yaron Farkash	July 11, 2025	TBA	N/A
In a follow-up to No Time to Spy, the Loud family is in London, England. Lincoln tells the viewers that Mick Swagger has contacted Luna who has invited her family to attend his knighting ceremony at Buckingham Palace. Once there, Lincoln runs into Myrtle's old spy boss X (Sarah Niles) who is on a secret mission for Interspy that involves something that will be stolen during the knighting ceremony. He ropes his family into helping out X. When the lights briefly go off at the event after the Louds mistake some code words revolving around "musician", it is discovered that Mick has been kidnapped. Lincoln and Luna find a clue to Mick's abduction and are unable to convince X of it causing the Louds to follow his trail that leads them to the Earl of Nuttingham (Bruce Mackinnon) who plans to have Mick do a never-ending concert to make up for Mick not attending his birthday after Mick's 100th concert.
286	18	"Europe Road Trip: Nonna Your Business"	Jessica Borutski	Andrew Brooks	Anna Hill	July 18, 2025	TBA	N/A
286	18	"Europe Road Trip: Alpining Away"	Patrick Pakula	Byron Dockins	Lake Fama	July 18, 2025	TBA	N/A
As a reward from Mick Swagger, the Loud family has gained a road trip across Europe. Their first stop is Naples, Italy. The Loud family has been backpacking for pizza as they use the directions from Gus to the world's best pizza. They arrive at the house of Nonna Viola (Isabella Rossellini) who is a pen-pal of Gus. She makes them the pizza in question where the family-guarded recipe was in her family for centuries dating back to the time of Julius Caesar. After trying it, the Loud family want to know the secrets of making it as she has them gather ingredients where they harvest wheat while contending with her wheat guard Old Man Giacarlone, gathering tomatoes from a cliffside, milk for the cheese from her aggressive cow Burrata, and a flat stone from Mount Vesuvius. As the Loud family arrives in the Swiss Alps, Lynn is going to partake in the snow fury. However, she develops a crush on a young clock store worker named Henrik after she stops a runaway dog. Lori and Leni learn about Lynn's crush as they help her out. They start by having Lynn browse clocks and wander into Henrik's direction. It does not go well when she accidentally kicks a cuckoo clock his way. Then she tries to join Henrik in the town polka and causes a crash. Lynn then gets to know Henrik while getting warm limburger. When Lynn finally gets to hang out with Henrik, she learns that Henrik is competing in the Snow Fury against Hans who beat him at the Snow Fury last year. To avoid getting on Henrik's bad side at the Snow Fury, Lynn mishears Lori and Leni's advice to be someone else as she poses as a girl named Helga at the Snow Fury.
287	19	"Europe Road Trip: A Bite in Transylvania"	Jessica Borutski	Adeline Colangelo	Colton Davis	July 25, 2025	TBA	N/A
287	19	"Europe Road Trip: Greece Is the Word"	Patrick Pakula	Kevin Sullivan	Max Alley	July 25, 2025	TBA	N/A
Upon entering Transylvania, the Loud family is reluctant to stop until their bus breaks down. Without Lana's tools, the Loud family find a nearby castle and knock on the door of Nos F. Ratu (Mark Gagliardi) and Ula Ratu (Lucie Pohl) who state that their landline is not working. As there are blood-sucking gnats roaming the skies at night, Lucy convinces the rest of the Loud family to stay the night in the Ratu family's castle. Due to various signs in the castle, the rest of the Loud family assumes that the Ratu family are vampires as Lucy claims that all the vampires were driven out years ago. Though the Loud family must take action when Nos and Ula take Lucy downstairs. In Athens, Greece, the Loud family get a tour of the Parthenon as the tour guide states that it used to be a market place and the vases depicting Greek mythology. Clyde is in contact via video call as a disinterested Lincoln stumbles upon a helmet that the Greek gods forged on Mount Olympus. Upon trying it on, Lincoln is transported back in time to 450 BC and he meets Clydius McBridius who suggests that they return it to the Parthenon. As they travel to Athens, Lincoln and Clydius run into different obstacles like the song of the Sirens, the hedge maze of the Minotaur, and solving the riddle of the Cyclops.

=== Season 9 (2025–26) ===
No. overall	No. in season	Title	Directed by	Written by	Storyboard by	Original release date	Prod. code	U.S. viewers (millions)
288	1	"Summer Camp: Ticked Off"	Jessica Borutski & Patrick Pakula	Whitney Wetta & Jeff Sayers	Michelle Hiraishi & Tom Kanter	August 1, 2025	TBA	N/A
Summer has begun and the Loud family and Clyde have arrived at Camp Mastodon for the summer. While Lori, Leni, Luna, Luan and Lynn Jr. become the counselors, Lynn Sr. becomes the chef, Rita revives the Mastodon Minute newspaper, and Lincoln, Clyde, Lucy, Lana, Lola, Lisa, and Lily are campers. Lincoln and Clyde are assigned to the Tick bunk as they meet their bunkmates Marshall and Iggy who are fans of Rip Hardcore. They also meet the Sabretooth Tiger bunk led by Jack Lumber who claim things as theirs. With the "Kings of the Camp" thing unaware to the adults, Lincoln cannot turn to Leonard for help or else Tick bunk would be branded "squealers". This causes Lincoln to invoke the Mastodon Marathon overseen by Patrick of Giant Sloth cabin. Lincoln fails at each challenge as he plans to lead Tick cabin using tips from Rip Hardcore in the survival challenge against Sabretooth Tiger bunk where Sabretooth Tiger bunk will claim their bunk if they win. Meanwhile, Lola plans to make Camp Mastodon less campy. Lynn Sr. plans to impress a camper named Emily who gave his food a one-tusk rating in the Mastodon Minute.
289	2	"Summer Camp: The Grate Outdoors"	Jessica Borutski	Andrew Brooks	Anna Hill	August 8, 2025 (Note: This episode aired early on TeenNick on August 3, 2025.)	TBA	N/A
289	2	"Summer Camp: Don't Lose Your Cool"	Colton Davis	Byron Dockins	Lake Fama	August 8, 2025	TBA	N/A
Lisa and Darcy in the Puffin bunk when they receive a message from Counselor Lydia who just got her wisdom teeth out and will not be back for the rest of the summer. Lynn becomes the new leader for Puffin bunk and has an epic day planned. As Lisa mentions the cautions of everything outside, she gives Lynn a day to show her that her claims are not bogus as Lynn leads Puffin bunk into proving that swimming, volleyball, rowing, tug of war, water balloons are not hazardous until a mishap with the zipline, a cicada tornado, a fish dragging her into the lake, and getting snatched by Artemis the Bald Eagle. Lori welcomes the campers Sasha, Jen, and Courtney to the Porcupine bunk. While at the mess hall, she overhears her campers talking about Lori being obsessed with the camp rules and considers her uncool. Lori tries to prove that she can be cool to Sasha, Jen, and Courtney. First is a Porcupine bunk photo by a tree that is off the trail where they get attacked by ants and falling into poison oak, an indoor golf course, and a hardened mud mask. After those mishaps and doing a Burpin' Burger run, Lori is tempted by Sasha, Jen, and Courtney into sneaking into the mess hall for dessert as Lori fears that they will get busted.
290	3	"Summer Camp: Treasure Haunt"	Jessica Borutsuki	Adeline Colangelo	Michelle Kim	August 15, 2025	TBA	N/A
290	3	"Summer Camp: Brawl of the Wild"	Colton Davis	Kevin Sullivan	Max Alley	August 15, 2025	TBA	N/A
As Lincoln and Clyde are doing some archery, Lincoln comes across a 4,000 pirate flag and decorates Tick cabin. Lucy advises them what would happen when an ancient artifact is unearthed. Later that night, Tick cabin is invaded by the zombie of Captain Kit and his octopus sidekick Octavius who accuses them of stealing his flag and wants his booty. Unfortunately, the booty is in Leonard's possession. When Leonard and Lucy are informed of it, Lincoln learns that most of the doubloons were used to run the camp leaving one doubloon left. Now they must work to find a way to get rid of Captain Kit and Octavius before Camp Mastodon is destroyed. Leni tells Lori that her ex-boyfriend Gavin is changing the part in his hair and that they are still friends. She ends up getting into a competition with another counselor named River who wears a safari jacket and toe shoes over a bowl of creamed corn. Leonard later pairs Leni and River up for running today's nature hike. During the hike, Leni and River compete to see who is a better counselor while constantly dishing out insults. At the waterfall, Leni and River soon start to briefly know each other. Because Leni thought that River was littering with the makers, Leni and River must work together to find their way back to Camp Mastodon.
291	4	"Merry Diss-mas"	Jessica Borutski	Byron Dockins	Anna Hill	December 5, 2025	TBA	N/A
291	4	"Just Snow With It"	Patrick Pakula	Andrew Brooks	Lake Fama	December 5, 2025	TBA	N/A
During the Christmas season, Lynn hears that her Swiss friend Henrik is coming to Royal Woods since his family is touring the United States. Upon his arrival, Lynn takes him to different locations while his parents rest before visiting Hazeltucky. However, Lynn gets nervous when Margo, Paula, Cheryl, and Meryl assume that she and Henrik are dating as Lynn works to prove them wrong which does not go well for Henrik. Meanwhile, Rita enters Mayor Davis' Holiday Decoration Contest that involves the most Christmas decorated house in Royal Woods. Determined not to be defeated by Mrs. Fox, Rita ropes Lucy, Lola, and Lisa into helping her out. Lincoln, Clyde, Liam, Rusty, Zach, Stella, and Kara see a commercial of a David Steele on Ice show that has David Steele facing off against the Yeti-like Dr. Snow. As the tour wraps up in Ontario, Canada, Lincoln and his friends need to raise money for it. They get the idea upon seeing Mr. Grouse struggling to shovel the snow in his yard. They help him out by shoveling the show for a small price. Then they do the same thing with Mayor Davis, Mrs. Bernardo, and Scoots. Afterwards, they find that they still do not have enough. Needing more snow to shovel, Lincoln borrows Lisa's cloud-seeding machine and work to hide it. Though they get the tickets, the cloud-seeding machine is accidentally grabbed by Lynn Sr. who mistakes it for a high-tech toaster causing a blizzard in Royal Woods.
292	5	"Crystal Ballin'"	Jessica Borutski	Whitney Wetta	Michelle Hiraishi	January 2, 2026 (Note: This episode aired early on Nicktoons on November 8, 2025.)	TBA	N/A
292	5	"The Most Dangerous Gamer"	Patrick Pakula	Jeff Sayers	Tom Kanter	January 2, 2026	TBA	N/A
When Lucy uses her crystal ball and tells Fangs that he only had one date with Batty Davis, Lynn ends up relenting to have her future told. She sees a glimpse of her future where she becomes the buff towel boy of Crikey. Lynn plans to improve her future. After looking into the crystal ball again to see if there are any changes, she sees that she has become the most decorated athlete in history at the cost of losing contact with her friends and family. Lynn then bonds with everyone which results in her future being changed where she is a buff sports star, but she has buff kids with Rusty. This leads Lynn to become obsessed with maintaining her future causing Lucy to come up with a plan to get Lynn out of this phase. Known gamer ThumbZ (Khleo Thomas) is inviting his viewers to a special contest where the first person to finish his speed run of his classic video game "Space Snowmen" will win a trip with two friends to the ThumbZ Pad where they will beta test his first top secret game. Lincoln, Clyde, and Kara hear about it as Lincoln and Clyde invite Kara to join their Button Mashing Buds group. They partake in their pre-gaming ritual and play "Space Snowmen". Kara wins the game as she brings Lincoln and Clyde with her. Upon arrival, they meet ThumbZ whose game was stolen by competitors as Kara becomes one step ahead of Lincoln and Clyde as they contend with obstacles. Lincoln and Clyde must talk Kara into working as a team when confronting the thieves and reclaiming the game.
293	6	"Meet the Purrents"	Jessica Borutski	Adeline Colangelo	Colton Davis	January 9, 2026	TBA	N/A
293	6	"Apartment Complex"	Patrick Pakula	Kevin Sullivan	Max Alley	January 9, 2026	TBA	N/A
During their Pizzaversary, Lori and Bobby find a stray kitten in the alley of Big Joey's Uptown Pizza and it likes the taste of pepperoni. When the kitten starts following them, Lori and Bobby decide to adopt it as they become co-parents as they will trade off each week. Bobby starts as he starts to have it play video games and hang out with the local street cats. One week later, Lori watches over Pepperoni and has it eat special cat food and wear pajamas. On Bobby's turn, Lori hires Carl to make sure Pepperoni does the stuff she wants it to do. On Lori's turn, Bobby hires Lola to do the stuff that he wants it to do. After Pepperoni runs off during the confrontation, Bobby and Lori must work to find it. Lori's life in Mr. Grouse's garage has improved since she first moved in there as Rita wants everyone to respect Lori's privacy. However, Lynn wants to use Lori's apartment to watch some sports tournaments since her house does not have the channels they are on and Paula's parents do not want Lynn over after she spiked one of their antiques. When she goes over there, she finds that Leni wanted to use the improved lighting to work on her tutorials, Lana wanted to use the deep sink to wash the pets, and Lola wanted to use the shower to prepare for a pageant. To compromise, they each pick a day to do their respective activities. When Lori is at home due to The Burnt Bean undergoing some "beanovation", Leni, Lynn, Lana, and Lola each take turns to get her out of the apartment which lasts until Mr. Grouse asks Lori about the bills he received.
294	7	"Pet Project"	Jessica Borutski	Whitney Wetta	Michelle Hiraishi	January 16, 2026	TBA	N/A
294	7	"Cuff Break"	Patrick Pakula	Andrew Brooks	Tom Kanter	January 16, 2026	TBA	N/A
At the Super Mart, Lana and Lola are grocery shopping with Rita where they get stuff that enables them to get lottery tickets for a weekend at Grand Coyote Canyon. While Rita claims that those contests are rigged, she and the twins win the lottery. Unfortunately, Rita tells Lana that Grand Coyote Canyon is not pet friendly. After attempts to see if Luna, Lincoln, Luan, Lisa, and Leni would watch them, Lana sneaks Geo, Hops, El Diablo, Bitey, and her new scorpion King Tut into Grand Canyon Lodge. She must also keep the pets from being discovered by the pet-sensing manager Mr. Finkle who gets annoyed with Lola's different complaints. When the pets get out, Lana must round them up before she, Lola, and Rita get thrown out. While waiting for the bus, Lincoln shows off his magic trick to his sisters. As nobody wants to volunteer for his latest trick, Lincoln ends up roping Mr. Grouse in a handcuff trick that he tries to unlock magically. Unfortunately, it backfires and the associated keys had fallen into the toilet. Lincoln leaves a message on The Amazing Brailster's phone. As a result, Lincoln drags Mr. Grouse to Royal Woods Middle School. As the latest of Lincoln's magical snafu, Mr. Bolhofner offers to have Nurse Noelle on standby. Eventually, Mr. Grouse's skills turn his Lincoln's plight around with his middle school knowledge as Mr. Grouse resists The Amazing Brailster from contacting Lincoln until The Amazing Brailster's letter states that he will be leaving for his month-long trip to his timeshare in Tampa, Florida soon.
295	8	"Prom-Com"	Jessica Borutski	Jeff Sayers	Anna Hill	January 23, 2026	TBA	N/A
295	8	"Scene Steeler"	Patrick Pakula	Byron Dockins	Lake Fama	January 23, 2026	TBA	N/A
At Royal Woods High School, Leni meets with committee members Jackee, Mandee, Ellie, and Parker as they prepare for prom season. With Leni as Prom Captain, she gets some comments from some students, Principal Rivers, and Mrs. Bernardo who mention their prom experiences. Leni soon starts to get worried about how good prom is and wants to make prom special. She plans to make it better and bigger. Once that is done, Leni learns about Lori and Rita's prom experiences causing Leni to make prom even better. On prom night, Jackee, Mandee, Ellie, and Parker find that Leni had improved it where it all started to go awry. Lincoln and Clyde are trying to come up a script for their next David Steele fan film and that their latest videos have not done well. They get the idea of a former ally of David Steel and Alloy who sided with M.A.L.I.C.E. named Bee-Trayal who is a bee-themed villain. They offer the part to Luan due to her being a professional actor much to the dismay of Lola. Once they begin their film, Luan starts to use her deep dive tech to stay in her Bee-Trayal character. They end up having to deal with Luan off-set when she continues to act like Bee-Trayal. After Luan was fired for going too far, Lincoln and Clyde try to find another actor to portray Bee-Trayal like Lucy, Leni, Mr. Grouse, and Tanya to no avail.
296	9	"Rough Patch"	Jessica Borutski	Adeline Colangelo	Colton Davis	January 30, 2026	TBA	N/A
296	9	"The GLOAT"	Patrick Pakula	Kevin Sullivan	Max Alley	January 30, 2026	TBA	N/A
At Sunset Canyon Retirement Home, the Snickerdoodle Scouts that Lana and Lola are a part of the honor to win the Good Companion Badge and win the Golden Snickerdoodle Sash. The scout leader Ms. Trent must spend the afternoon with an elderly person and do things with them at the Royal Woods Mall. Trent pairs Lana with Seymour and Lola with Bernie. He proves to be talkative as Lola works to put up with him. When at the Royal Woods Mall, she tries to get Bernie to cooperate with her as he tries to pick a sock, paying for his purchased items, takes Lola to Sloppy Jake's, and preferring a massage. Against her consciousness, Lola takes advantage of Bernie falling asleep until she starts to regret it. Lincoln is playing a board game with his little sisters as Shiloh hangs out with the Loud family for a day as he does not want to join in his mother's hot yoga. Shiloh sees Lynn about to do her latest super-stunt as Shiloh calls her a GLOAT (short for Greatest Loud of All Time). Shiloh does the super-stunt with some additions, outdoing Lynn. Then Lynn does a jetpack stunt as Shiloh ends up detouring to Burpin' Burger. Getting jealous after the cannonball stunt, Lynn plans to be the only G.L.O.A.T. in Royal Woods as she later states that there are different tests of endurance and grit. She and Shiloh participate in different challenges like belch power, grit, and strength.
297	10	"Cupid's Harrow"	Colton Davis	Jeff Sayers	Tom Kanter	February 6, 2026	TBA	N/A
297	10	"Spy Dames"	Jessica Borutski	Whitney Wetta	Michelle Hiraishi	February 6, 2026	TBA	N/A
At Reininger's, Leni and Miguel have started a relationship and dating podcast called Cupid Cuties in the break room as they give advice and have Flip's businesses as sponsors. They end up getting a call from Bobby, who states that he has a job offer to run a mercado down in Mexico. This may help him learn more about what he is and he asks how he can take time off from his relationship. As Miguel recognizes Bobby's voice, Leni unknowingly gives Bobby the advice to take the job. Leni works to keep Lori from meeting with Bobby in Great Lakes City and keep Bobby from breaking up with her. When Lori wants to take time off from Bobby to do self-discovery, she works to keep Lori from breaking up with Bobby. Today is Grandparents' Day at Royal Woods Middle School. Lincoln brought Myrtle, Clyde brought Nana Gayle, and Zach brought Bernie as a substitute because his real grandfather is hiding out in the New Zealand bush due to government business. In addition, Chef Pat is trying recipes from Grandma Chef Pat's cookbook. Myrtle then recognizes Boy Jordan's grandmother Gertie as an old tunneling enemy of her past called Gopher who has eluded her in the past. Lincoln helps Myrtle find proof that Gertie is the Gopher by locating the signature gopher tattoo on her back. Each attempt fails until a discovery in the bathroom leads to a confrontation between Myrtle and Gertie as Lincoln and Jordan get involved in the struggle.
298	11	"Man of My Schemes"	Colton Davis	Adeline Colangelo	Max Alley	February 13, 2026	TBA	N/A
298	11	"My Phony Valentine"	Jessica Borutski	Byron Dockins	Mishelle Kim	February 13, 2026	TBA	N/A
After separating from Bobby, Lori shows Leni her latest pictures on her SwiftyPic account until Leni notices something on Lori's account. Leni works to keep Lori from seeing it until Lynn gets ahold of Leni's phone and reveals that Bobby has gotten a new girlfriend. Displeased that Bobby got a new relationship before her, Lori plans to find a new boyfriend of her own. The next day, Leni establishes an online dating profile for Lori on I'm With Cupid who sees that Leni had posted terrible pictures of her. As Leni leaves Lori at The Burnt Bean to go join River in doing something with dung beetles, Lori holds auditions for a new boyfriend while reviewing the applicants like a Cheaper Reaper worker, a young magician, and a clown until she decides to get her co-worker Paraag involved after seeing Scoots telling him to get out of her filter to avoid Tyler getting jealous. She gets the idea to have Paraag pose as her latest boyfriend with a surprise outcome. Amber of Hazeltucky has given Rusty a second chance at dating her as they hang out at Gus' Games & Grub. With help from Gus, Rusty has a "Be My Valentine" pizza made for her and an offer to join her for Kisses, Crepes and Karaoke at Jean Juan's French-Mex restaurant hosted by Trevor Budden on Valentine's Day. Unfortunately, Rodney's Duds for Dude's business is a rival of Garb 4 Guys led by Amber's mother Annette as Rodney and Annette don't want their kids dating each other. Wanting to still do the event at Jean Juan's with Amber, Rusty enlists Lincoln, Liam, Zach, and Kara to help him out where Zach poses as Amber's fake date and Kara poses as Rusty's fake date so that Rusty and Amber can find a way to sneak off to Jean Juan's French Mex restaurant.
299	12	"Bean Dreams"	Colton Davis	Kevin Sullivan	Tom Kanter	February 20, 2026	TBA	N/A
299	12	"Student of the Jeer"	Jessica Borutski	Adeline Colangelo	Michelle Hiraishi	February 20, 2026	TBA	N/A
At The Burnt Bean, Beany tells Lori that she has a strong future in The Burnt Bean organization and asks if she considered getting her frappster's degree from the Brewniversity of Beansylvania where she would have her pick of Burnt Bean franchises to manage like the ones in New York, Paris, and Worcester, Massachusetts. While envisioning herself in Paris, Lori is then told that the university's dean Joe Brewer is coming to evaluate her and will recommend her to the admissions' team if she impresses him. After delivering some mocha to Cheryl, Lori ends up filling in as playground monitor after the students spill mocha on Cheryl who had to go home and change. Because of the delay, Beany had to persuade the Joe to try again Friday. she meets Joe and ends up preoccupied about Petey Whimple's recurring stomachaches which might affect her chances. At Royal Woods Middle School, Stella visits Meryl, helps Trevor Budden with a coffee stain while having finished the Treblemakers' costumes, and is praised on her bonus math homework by Mr. Bolhofner who is still hunting a poison dart frog. Upon overhearing some student that she is a teacher's pet, Stella is told by Lincoln that she has been called a goody two-shoes. Displeased with this reputation, Stella plans to change her image by doing bad stuff while secretly undoing them. Stella learns that the Student of the Year Award votes are happening from Meryl who states that she is a shoo-in for the award. She tries to find someone else to be voted at the SOTYs which becomes difficult as she ends up trying to affect it which leads to her getting confronted by Principal Ramirez.
300	13	"Living the Dream Boat"	Jessica Borutski & Colton Davis	Jeff Sayers & Andrew Brooks	Mishelle Kim & Max Alley	February 27, 2026	TBA	N/A
Since breaking up with Bobby in "Cupid's Harrow", Lori sees an advertisement from Bryan Seavest of "The Dream Boat" holding a contest for a bachelorette to star in the next season of "The Dream Boat". A few days later, Bryan and his camera operator show up to tell Lori that she has won the position as she brings her family to make the show ratings gold. Meanwhile, in Michoacán, Mexico, Bobby is running Hector's new mercado when he sees Lori on a commercial promoting the upcoming season of "The Dream Boat". With Bobby saddened by this, Ronnie Anne enlists Lincoln (who has been getting criticism about his choice of cruise hats) to help get him on "The Dream Boat". Lincoln has a Portland, Oregon taxidermist named Jeremy bribed with a lifetime supply of Chicharrón from the mercado and dresses Bobby as him. As "The Dream Boat" is watched by people that the Loud family knows, Lori meets the suitors like fromager Jacques from Cannes, SwiftyPic social media influencer Jayden, doctor/philanthropist/former Rhodes scholar/Heisman Trophy winner Jett from Aspen, Colorado, and a disguised Bobby. Bobby struggles to win back Lori through each of the challenges without giving himself away, even when he and Jett are the only ones left.
301	14	"Hologram Jam"	Jessica Borutski	Andrew Brooks	Anna Hill	March 6, 2026	TBA	N/A
Lincoln is looking forward to playing the video game "Space Snowman" with Clyde during this weekend. Unfortunately, Rita wants him to clean his room first. Hearing an explosion, Lincoln finds that Lisa set up a back-up lab in her closet following an hydrogen dioxide incident that singed off Lily's tuft and has invented a hologram device. With Lincoln wanting to make use of the device, Lisa runs him through its operation and has him sign a waiver where she will not be held accountable. Once he programs his Holo-Maker app to make it look like he's cleaning his room, Lincoln soon creates two more when Lynn Sr. wants him to do some studying for a big test on Monday and to attend Luan's comedy show. When a bath accident occurs while Lynn Sr. and Rita are at work, holograms start popping up around town as Lincoln works to get rid of them.
302	15	"Ship Wreckers"	Patrick Pakula	Byron Dockins	Lake Fama	March 6, 2026	TBA	N/A
While retrieving Todd's head after he boxed with Mr. Reinforced Titanium Arms, Lisa comes across Leni and Luna setting up the living room for a viewing party of "The Dream Boat" season finale with Gavin and Sam. At Lisa's suggestion, Leni and Luan contact Leonard to let them use his boat for the viewing party. He allows them to have the viewing party in exchange for keeping their shindig to the four of them as he doesn't want anything bad to happen to the boat. Once the viewing party happens, Gavin receives pizza from Spencer who also received extra garlic knots from Gus. Spencer's SwiftyPic about the viewing party also attracts Parker and other students. After Scoots crashes her jetski into the side of Leonard's boat, Leni, Luna, Gavin, and Sam work to fix the hole in the boat before Leonard gets back.
303	16	"Kanga-Ruse"	Jessica Borutski	Whitney Wetta	Michelle Hiraishi	March 13, 2026	TBA	N/A
303	16	"The Walking Bed"	Patrick Pakula	Jeff Sayers	Tom Kanter	March 13, 2026	TBA	N/A
At Royal Woods Middle School, Lincoln and Clyde report on the Action News that Crikey the Kangaroo will be expanding his famous halftime show as Stella reports on Liam's training of Crikey and Mr. Budden leading the school's pep band. Just then, Lincoln gets an urgent news about Chef Pat's deep freezer being vandalized. The Action News Team arrives as Chef Pat states that someone ate all the school's Michigan Cherry flavor ice cream. Then Mr. Budden states that the music room has been hit as it is found vandalized and so is the teacher's lounge complete with kangaroo poop. Due to some evidence, Crikey is to blame as the poop test run by Lisa states that it was from a kangaroo. With Principal Ramirez planning to have Crikey transferred to a zoo, Liam learns that Crikey was framed as the Action News Team works to find the real culprit and bring them to justice. Lincoln informs the viewers that Lori has ordered a new mattress and plans to get her old one which is still in good shape unlike his current mattress. When he wants to help Lori move her new mattress in, Lincoln learns that Lori gave her old mattress to Leni because she's next in line due to the family rule called the Loud Line of Succession. Brushing up on it, Lincoln states that if the next oldest sibling passes on it, it will go down to the next oldest sibling. He starts by taking Tanya to Gus' Games & Grub for her birthday while Leni is at work as Chandler criticizes it. Then he does the same offers to the other big sisters like being a roadie to the Moon Goats' latest gig due to Chunk being indisposed and repeat the Gus' Games & Grub trip for Mr. Coconuts. Though Lynn doesn't want to give it up causing Lincoln to make use of an amendment.
304	17	"Hamalot"	Jessica Borutski	Andrew Brooks	Anna Hill	April 3, 2026	TBA	N/A
304	17	"Garbage Dumped"	Patrick Pakula	Byron Dockins	Lake Fama	April 3, 2026	TBA	N/A
As Lance and Sharon have breakfast, they learn that Shelby is preparing for the deli meat-themed LARP called "Orcs, Horks, Wizards, and Porks" in Royal Woods. With Sharon having to attend to a yoga-mergency, Lance drives Shelby to Royal Woods in order to get some father-daughter reps in as they haven't connected a lot since Shelby was younger. Upon arrival in Tall Timbers Park, they meet up with Lincoln (who is portraying Spare Rib), Lynn Sr. (who is portraying Hamdalf the Wise), Grant (who is the referee Lord of the Links), Flip (who is portraying Sir Loin), Kotaro, Howard, and Harold. Shelby's character is a half-orc ranger called Pork Ranger as Lance becomes Dumbleboar. Dumbleboar struggles to master the LARP when playing with Hamdalf the Wise, Spare Rib, and Pork Ranger against Sir Loin's team while trying to connect with Pork Ranger. Today is Trash Day as Lana and Hops meet with the waste collector Dink and his garbage truck Greta Gar-Báge as she helps to load her family's garbage and compacting the entire garbage. Lana soon learns that Mayor Davis has informed Dink that this will be his last trash and is Greta with an automated garbage truck. Lana and Hops go to Royal Woods City Hall in an attempt to get Mayor Davis to change her mind as she shows Lana the Rubbish Rampager Version 7. Lana proposes to Mayor Davis that Dink competes with the RR7 as she allows Dink to have a fighting chance in the Debris Grand Prix with each one covering half the town. Despite Dink's efforts, the RR7 wins due to Dink and Lana being fooled by the RR7's camouflage mode. Displeased with that, Lana works on making it fail with comical results until Lana learns what makes Dink different from the RR7.
305	18	"Gags to Riches"	Jessica Borutski	Whitney Wetta	Michelle Hiraishi	April 10, 2026	TBA	N/A
305	18	"Sole Searching"	Patrick Pakula	Jeff Sayers	Tom Kanter	April 10, 2026	TBA	N/A
At Fanny's Prank Emporium, Luan asks Fanny on if she has anything good due to her getting the prank itch. As Luan already did everything in Fanny's Prank Emporium like the exploding ink pen on her family and blue dye chewing gum on Katherine Mulligan, she receives a fake lottery ticket from Fanny which Luan ends up using on Mr. Grouse who always buys a lottery ticket on Friday. When Mr. Grouse actually falls for the prank and thinks he won, Luan finds that he actually cashed it in and bought some stuff after Luan got delayed telling him the truth. Because Mr. Grouse can't give back calf implants, a pro-hockey team, and a second house in Italy, Luan takes Mr. Grouse on the run as they hide out in a Camp Mastodon cabin while Leonard is fishing as Mayor Davis and Katherine Mulligan put out a reward for Grouse's capture that Mr. Bolhofner and Flip take part in with Mr. Grouse facing a lifetime in the Cherry Pit Mines. After seeing a commercial of the Crossover 2s basketball shoes promoted by Kai Kelly (Andia Winslow) of the Great Lakes Holy Mackerels who has considered them her signature basketball shoes, Lynn plans to get a pair of Crossover 2s as she tells Leni that Kai is the basketball GOAT and has the biggest tournament of the year coming up and her shoes are getting worn out. Leni accompanies Lynn to camp outside the Royal Woods Mall so that she can learn more about basketball fashion. The first attempt at the Royal Woods Mall doesn't go the way Lynn hopes when she has to defecate and the Sneakers Sneakers store opens earlier than normal. This leads Lynn and Leni to go to different shoe stores in order to get the Crossover 2s with comical results. Upon learning that Kai uses up different Crossover 2s every game, Lynn and Leni plan to get into Great Lakes Arena to find the discarded Crossover 2s while also having to avoid getting caught by Stern Fern.
306	19	"Swimming Fools"	Jessica Borutski	Adeline Colangelo	Colton Davis	April 17, 2026	TBA	N/A
306	19	"Stage Combat"	Patrick Pakula	Michelle Hantman	Max Alley	April 17, 2026	TBA	N/A
On a hot day, Lincoln, Clyde, Liam, Rusty, Zach, Stella, and Kara try to stay cool. Stella reveals that her neighbor is Principal Ramirez and how she is house-sitting while Principal Ramirez is away at a teacher's conference for the weekend. While Stella will be watering her plants and feeding her three pet parrots, Principal Ramirez' house is revealed to have a swimming pool which Stella never asked about. Stella texts Principal Ramirez as they wait at her house for a response. When her friends get tired of waiting, they jump into the swimming pool. Stella finally gets a response from Principal Ramirez where her emoji response has negative emojis on it. Now Stella and her friends must clean up the swimming pool and deal with the parrots that repeated everything they said before Principal Ramirez comes home. At The Burnt Bean, Luan tells Paraag about Reginald Robinson Riley III of Huntington Oaks is awarding an artist grant to a gifted high school student that dazzles him and a live audience in a performance piece of their choice. Luna has also heard about the competition as she and Luan plan not to end up in a competition with each other. Luna and Luan help each other with their respective acts as Lola detects that the brewing drama that will happen when they are in the competition where there is money involved. After each helping, Luna and Luan start doing things behind each other's back and start to spy on each other. This leads to a breaking point where it's every sister for themselves as they improve their respective acts with various results.
307	20	"Sick as a Dad"	Patrick Pakula	Kevin Sullivan	Max Alley	April 24, 2026	TBA	N/A
Lynn Sr. wakes up with a cold causing Lincoln and his sisters to flee to Lori's apartment because he acts dramatic when under the weather. As Rita has to work, she asks her children to take care of him until she gets back. They end up having to do things for Lynn Sr. like making tea and crustless toast, massaging his aching feet and eyes, serenading him in major keys, read the latest David Steele comic while skipping the suspenseful parts, and give him a comedy routine that won't make him LOL. Upon getting annoyed, the children enlist Todd in his Nurse Dot alias to take care of him. This doesn't go well when Todd goes out of commission and Lynn Sr. makes his way to the office of Dr. Peterson as Lincoln and his sisters go after him before things get worse.

=== Season 10 (2026) ===
"Summer Camp: The Grate Outdoors"/"Summer Camp: Don't Lose Your Cool", "Summer Camp: Treasure Haunt"/"Summer Camp: Brawl of the Wild", "Spy Dames/Cupid's Harrow", "My Phony Valentine/Man of My Schemes", and "Student of the Jeer/Bean Dreams" were produced and packaged as part of season 10, but are listed under season nine in accordance to their air dates.

No. overall	No. in season	Title	Directed by	Written by	Storyboard by	Original release date	Prod. code	U.S. viewers (millions)
308	1	"Clyde Can't Decide"	Jessica Borutski	Andrew Brooks	Anna Hill	May 1, 2026	TBA	N/A
308	1	"Shred of Evidence"	Colton Davis	Byron Dockins	Lake Fama	May 1, 2026	TBA	N/A
At Royal Woods Middle School, Clyde is torn from having to sign up for Italian 101 or Spanish 101. He can't ask Dr. Lopez for help as she is on a retreat to the desert oasis Xanadunes where the answering machine from her receptionist Jared states that she can't make an exception for Clyde. He starts having decision problems like deciding between cake or pudding, picking a desk on Endless Variables Tuesday in Mrs. Salter's math class, choosing between Girl Jordan's mechanical pencil or wooden pencil, exiting Mrs. Salter's classroom, and which of Clyde's dads should Meryl call. Clyde enlists Lincoln to get to Xanadunes and Flip for help as he hooks him up with his "associate" Pete who owns Pete's Planes & Personal Pan Pizzas. After an airplane crash, Lincoln, Clyde, and Pete make it to Xanadunes where they must get past the guard. At the Little Miss Big Belch pageant hosted by Dana Dufesne and sponsored by the Burpin' Burger, Lola is competing against Lindsay Sweetwater. As Lindsey goes to perform, Lola finds her Little Miss Big Belch gown shredded. At Andre's advice, Lola plans to find evidence on if Lindsay was responsible. Soon, Lindsay's dress is ruined and she is blaming Lola. This leads to Dana banning them from the Little Miss Big Belch pageant for blaming each other. Knowing that someone else was responsible, Lola and Lindsay end up working together to find the real culprit so that Dana can let them back into the Little Miss Big Belch pageant. They start seeing if it was anyone who has a grudge against them like Jackie, Chinah, and Claudette while avoiding Dana and her dog Tiara. This soon leads to the discovery of the most unlikeliest of suspects.
309	2	"The Big Move" "One False Move"	Jessica Borutski	Adeline Colangelo	Mishelle Kim	September 11, 2026	TBA	N/A
309	2	"Personal Train Wreck"	Colton Davis	Kevin Sullivan	Max Alley	September 11, 2026	TBA	N/A
On Saturday, Shelby is going to be hanging out with Lincoln while Uncle Lance and Aunt Sharon check on their new gym in Royal Woods. While doing their activity of squirrel-watching, they find that the house next to Mr. Grouse's house is up for sale. This causes Lincoln and Shelby to pitch "Operation: Relocation" to Leni, Luna, Luan, Lynn, Shane, and Shiloh that would have Lance's family moving from Pleasant Hills to Royal Woods. Lincoln and Shelby plan to delay Lance and Aunt Sharon's departure that involves showing them different places in Royal Woods under the cover of losing her souvenir Mackinac Bridge floatie pen. This lasts until Lance loses his wallet which leads to different comical outcomes. Now that Uncle Lance is in Royal Woods, Lynn has become one of the Endur-Lance Gym's known patrons. As a gym-tern, she has made some changes to accommodate anyone who gets injured, pulls a muscle, or gets dehydrated. When one of the trainers can't make due to a stomachache from sushi from Flip's Food & Fuel, Lynn persuades Lance to let her teach a fitness class. On the day of the fitness class, Lynn ends up teaching Seymour, Cheryl, and Benny with the basics by having Seymour lift small weights, having Cheryl use a stair walker, and having Benny do some core exercises. By the end of the week, Seymour, Cheryl, and Benny have not made any improvements, causing Lynn to work on their lifestyles.
310	3	"Nobody Puts Baby in a Corral"	Jessica Borutski	Michelle Hantman	Michelle Hiraishi	September 18, 2026	TBA	N/A
310	3	"Birthday Stiffed"	Colton Davis	Whitney Wetta	Tom Kanter	September 18, 2026	TBA	N/A
At Dairyland, Lily is placed in the Kiddie Corral by Lori and Luna as the rides are too intense for her. However, Lily ropes her friends Michelle and Jeffrey into sneaking out of the Kiddie Corral. Once they are outside the Kiddie Corral, Lily, Michelle, and Jeffrey get the idea to borrow the costume for Tippy the Cow to get on "Lactose Intolerant". Before Lily, Michelle, and Jeffrey can get back to Kiddie Corral, they are delayed by Amir and Sasha wanting an autograph and taking them on faster rides. Today is Clyde's birthday as Lincoln is planning on getting him a super thoughtful gift by winning enough tickets to get him a volcano lamp. Unfortunately, he learns from Leni that the same lava lamps were in Reininger's where they leaked everywhere and was instructed by Ms. Carmichael to take them to the city dump. Leni agrees to help Lincoln find a new gift for Clyde. She shows Lincoln her re-gifting closet and her VIP shelf, but none of the items are good enough. After hearing about Miguel's celeb gift from fashion designer Georgina Alessandra, Lincoln gets the idea to have Clyde receive a Celeb Gift from Rip Hardcore by tracking him down in the swamp.
311	4	"All Pets Are Off"	Jessica Borutski	Jeff Sayers	Anna Hill	September 25, 2026	TBA	N/A
311	4	"Brain Man"	Colton Davis	Andrew Brooks	Lake Fama	September 25, 2026	TBA	N/A
At Sunset Canyon Retirement Home, Lana and Hops are helping Albert with Senior Bingo Night because Bernie keeps falling asleep mid-game. Albert tells Lana about Flo (Jackie Hoffman), who moved in a few months ago after her husband Francis died and is not a people person. Lana brings up her work at the Royal Woods Animal Shelter as Flo caves in to each of Lana's pet offers. She has Flo take the LCAT (short for Lana's Compatibility w' Animals Test) which will help her find a compatible pet and auditions each one until it comes to Spike the Hedgehog, who is a good match. When Spike appears to have eaten Francis' clown nose, Lana works to get it out of Spike before Flo finds out. At Royal Woods Middle School, Zach talks about his studying of the Bibblebork aliens when Rusty and Stella remind him that they have to prepare for the M.U.S.T.Y. (Michigan Universal Standard Tests for Youths). The next day, Zach is told that he received a 345, making him a genius; much to the surprise of Mrs. Salter and the other students. Lincoln leads his friends in studying for Mr. Bolhofner's math mid-term Counting on Survival: Math Equations in the Wild. Zach soon develops an ego which goes awry when he finds that he handed in the wrong test and works to keep Mr. Bolhofner from giving the exam through whatever way possible.
312	5	"Hobblin' the Goblin"	Jessica Borutski	Kevin Sullivan	Michelle Hiraishi	October 2, 2026	TBA	N/A
312	5	"Fruit Dispute"	Colton Davis	Michelle Hantman	Tom Kanter	October 2, 2026	TBA	N/A
At Royal Woods Elementary School, Principal Huggins has called the Morticians Club into his office and informs them that Superintendent Chen is paying a visit to do an inspection to see if Principal Huggins is a shoo-in for Principal of the Year. He warns them of they do anything to affect Superintendent Chen's inspection, he will see to it that their club is disbanded. Lucy and the others learn that Boris had brought his spooky cookbook to school for his book report and has lost it. They discover that Mrs. Johnson has made goblin cupcakes from the cookbook she found that is said to turn anyone into a goblin. The Morticians Club must work to keep the goblin cupcakes from being eaten by the teachers even when the final one ends up in Superintendent Chen's clutches. Leni is interning under Mariella Moss again. She is shown Mariella's latest creation called the dragon fruit Leather Belts and is opening a pop-up shop at the Royal Woods Mall that will promote the dragon fruit Leather Belts. After helping River with a protest at Flip's Food & Fuel, Leni is shocked when River is part of a protest over the dragon fruit Leather Belts that River claims is unsustainable due to each belt requiring 20 dragon fruits and 374 gallons of ground water to make. Leni has Lincoln put Tanya on the phone to "ask her for advice", and she "takes the advice from Tanya" to support both Mariella and River without the other knowing. While testing the belt for Mariella, Leni struggles to balance satisfying the needs of Mariella and River with comical results.
313	6	"Grouse of Horrors"	Jessica Borutski	Whitney Wetta	Anna Hill	October 9, 2026	TBA	N/A
313	6	"The Lynning Ticket"	Colton Davis	Jeff Sayers	Lake Fama	October 9, 2026	TBA	N/A
In a follow-up to "One False Move", Mr. Grouse puts up with Lance's family moving in next door to him. Things get off to a bad start when Shelby fires the confetti cannon in the moving truck causing it to crash into Mr. Grouse's blue ribbon begonias and splattered mud on him. Then the kids mess up his privacy hedge playing football with Lincoln, Lynn, and Lana. After more mishaps from both Loud families, Mr. Grouse plans to get Lance's family to move out of the neighrborhood. After two attempts fail with comical results, Mr. Grouse gets inspired by Lucy working with the Morticians Club in conjuring the ghost of Ruby Sue and Lance's strength not working well on ghosts to get rid of them by posing as a ghost. Though Mr. Grouse ends up experiencing the aftermath he never saw comics. Lynn ropes Charles and Todd in looking for baseball tickets for the Royal Woods Volcanoes who had re-signed the clean-up hitter Slugger Fields. Inspired by Lincoln mentioning that the Action News Team has been getting free tickets, Lynn and Charles start an internet show called "Hockin' Loogies" for all types of sports fans and improves it after seeing Lynn Sr. watch some internet videos revolving around Guy Grazer's aspiring chef roastings by having her "Roast Beef of the Day" segment roasting bad sports performances. When Lynn and Charles get press passes from the Royal Woods Volcanoes that doesn't get them into the VIP press box, they see Slugger performing badly as Lynn roasts each slumping performance. Even when Lynn and Charles get gold VIP passes, they learn the fallout of someone being roasted when they encounter Slugger at a sporting goods store.
314	7	"Shane or Shine"	Jessica Borutski	Andrew Brooks	Mishelle Kim	October 16, 2026	TBA	N/A
314	7	"My Science Fair Lady"	Colton Davis	Byron Dockins	Max Alley	October 16, 2026	TBA	N/A
Shane is beginning his first day at Royal Woods High School as Leni, Luna, and Luan will be on standby to help him since starting a new school in the middle of the year can be tough. Upon entering, Shane does an a capella introduction to the nearby students and the one-on-one approach which goes horribly and comically awry as he repeatedly avoids a tough-looking student named George. Shane starts by asking Luna for help as she and the Moon Goats give him a brand refresh to help him be edgy. Though Luan and Leni end up having their own version of brand refresh as Shelby infiltrates the school as a janitor and tells him to combine them. Though this combination ends up having disastrous results. At Royal Woods Elementary School, Principal Huggins and Cheryl are preparing for the upcoming science fair. Lisa learns that this year's science fair theme is going green. When Lisa considers herself the winner, Principal Huggins reveals to Lisa that there is a new genius in Royal Woods Elementary School as she meets Jonas (Kate Micucci) who created an enzyme to solve the world's plastic crisis and is now developing a self-cooling metal for the playground slides. This causes Lisa to end up jealous and works to create something more impressive. When she finds out that Jonas is going to use a potato to power up the school, Lisa provides a few genetic modifications to a howler pepper she obtained from the Hunnicutt Farm in order to power all of Royal Woods. On the day of the science fair, Lisa finds that the howler pepper has turned into a Pepper Monster as she works to save Cheryl from it.
315	8	"Con Girl"	Jessica Borutski	Michelle Hantman	Anna Hill	October 23, 2026	TBA	TBD
315	8	"No Fun Run"	Colton Davis	Whitney Wetta	Lake Fama	October 23, 2026	TBA	TBD
At Jean Juan's French Mex Buffet, Lola and Lana are being served salsa verde quiches. Lola finds a hair on her quiche and brings it up with the waiter causing him to comp all her meals and throw in a chilaquiles à la mode. Lola wonders if she can "make things safer" at other places as Lana questions her about it. The does the same thing slipping in a water puddle at the Royal Woods Hotel and Spa, falling off of the Full Throttle motorcycle game at Gus's Games & Grub, and getting her dress caught on Scoot's mobility scooter at Reininger's. Her biggest challenge comes from "Jack Sweet's Candy Factory" where she tries to "find an impefection" during a candy-bar mitzvah for a boy named Noah with comical/dramatic results. At Royal Woods Middle School, the students are faking injuries because today is 2 Mile Run Day where Coach Keck makes everyone run 2 miles. Coach Keck swiftly arrives and exposes the fake injuries stating that nobody gets out of 2 Mile Run Day. Shelby states that she and her classmates at her old school had ran 1 mile a day with bubble wands. After failing to convince Coach Keck of the flaws of 2 Mile Run Day, Lincoln then states that some of Coach Keck's fellow staff members can't do what the students can do. As a result of this, it's students vs. teachers as Lincoln, Clyde, Liam, and Stella go up against Coach Keck, Meryl, Mr. Bolhofner, and Chef Pat in different gym games.
316	9	"Writer's Retreat"	Jessica Borutski	Adeline Colangelo	Colton Davis	Unaired (Note: This episode was first released on Paramount+ on October 28, 2026.)	TBA	N/A

=== Season 11 ===
"Living the Dream Boat" was produced and packaged as part of season 11, but is listed under season nine in accordance to its air date.

No. overall	No. in season	Title	Directed by	Written by	Storyboard by	Original release date	Prod. code	U.S. viewers (millions)
TBA	TBA	"Graveyard Rift"	TBA	TBA	TBA	TBA	TBA	TBD
TBA	TBA	"The Big Leap"	TBA	TBA	TBA	TBA	TBA	TBD
TBA	TBA	"Table for None"	TBA	TBA	TBA	TBA	TBA	TBD
TBA	TBA	"Kindergarten Flop"	TBA	TBA	TBA	TBA	TBA	TBD
TBA	TBA	"Going Coconuts"	TBA	TBA	TBA	TBA	TBA	TBD
TBA	TBA	"Smotherhood"	TBA	TBA	TBA	TBA	TBA	TBD
TBA	TBA	"Trend Fretter"	TBA	TBA	TBA	TBA	TBA	TBD
TBA	TBA	"This Is My Fight Song"	TBA	TBA	TBA	TBA	TBA	TBD
TBA	TBA	"Hunger Games"	TBA	TBA	TBA	TBA	TBA	TBD
TBA	TBA	"To Glee or Not to Glee"	TBA	TBA	TBA	TBA	TBA	TBD
TBA	TBA	"Tough Act to Follow"	TBA	TBA	TBA	TBA	TBA	TBD
TBA	TBA	"Throw Me a Funny Bone"	TBA	TBA	TBA	TBA	TBA	TBD
TBA	TBA	"No Gus, No Fuss"	TBA	TBA	TBA	TBA	TBA	TBD
TBA	TBA	"Point of No Returns"	TBA	TBA	TBA	TBA	TBA	TBD
TBA	TBA	"Emotional Rollercoaster"	Jessica Borutski & Colton Davis	Adeline Colangelo & Kevin Sullivan	Mishelle Kim & Max Alley	Unaired (Note: This episode aired early on TeenNick on September 19, 2026.)	TBA	N/A

== Films (2021–25) ==
Title	Directed by	Written by	Original release date	U.S. viewers (millions)
The Loud House Movie	Dave Needham	Kevin Sullivan & Chris Viscardi	August 20, 2021	N/A
The Loud Family heads to Scotland for vacation. Upon arriving in the town of Loud Loch, the family find out from the castle's groundskeeper Angus (David Tennant) that they are descendants of the Scottish royalty. The Louds adjust to their discovery while experiencing the ghost of a descendant named Lucille Loud, a baby dragon, and an evil plot by the castle's disgruntled property caretaker Morag (Michelle Gomez).
A Loud House Christmas	Jonathan Judge	Liz Maccie	November 26, 2021	0.88
In this live-action film, it is the holiday season in Royal Woods. Lincoln (Wolfgang Schaeffer) wants to preserve the family traditions, but he learns that everyone has plans such as Lori (Lexi DiBenedetto) wanting to stay at Fairway University, Luna (Sophia Woodward) wanting to skiing with the Sharp family, Luan (Catherine Ashmore Bradley) having a gig at Sunset Canyon Retirement Home, and the other family members wanting to go to Miami. Upset with all this, Lincoln recruits Clyde (Jahzir Bruno) to "save Christmas". Upon successfully cancelling their plans, everyone is depressed and does not want to do Christmas. To make matters worse, the Christmas lights ceremony that Lily (Charlotte Ann Tucker and Lainey Jane Knowles) was supposed to light up is cancelled, so they have to fix everything before it is too late.
No Time to Spy: A Loud House Movie	Kyle Marshall	Whitney Wetta & Jeff Sayers	June 21, 2024	0.18
At an unidentified tropical island, Albert and Myrtle are getting married. As preparations are made at the Thunderball Resort run by Flip's cousin Flop and the Loud family keeps running into a seemingly friendly tourist named Fifi (Amy Sedaris), Lincoln ends up discovering that some minions working for Myrtle's old spy business enemy Dr. Rufus Dufus (Dan Fogler) are present. Discovering that Lincoln has taken action when she finds that Lincoln had replied to a text from her old boss X, Myrtle ends up going to keep Lincoln safe. When Myrtle is captured by Dr. Dufus' henchman Ham Hand (Paul Wight), Lincoln rounds up his family to rescue her, where they discover that the last person they least suspect is leading Dr. Dufus' minions.
A Loud House Christmas Movie: Naughty or Nice	Darin McGowan	Tony Gama-Lobo & Rebecca May	November 21, 2025	N/A
While wanting a Rip Hardcore multi-tool for Christmas, Lincoln unknowingly catches a resourceful Christmas elf named Duncan (Harvey Guillén) who arranges for Lincoln to be put on the Naughty List. Desperate to get off of the list, Lincoln gets into the North Pole's computer with help from Todd in order to get his name off the Naughty List. Something goes wrong when a technological error flips the entire world's Naughty and Nice Lists, causing everything in the North Pole to become naughty. Lincoln and his family travel to the North Pole, where they must work with Duncan to take on everything naughty there, including contending with a naughty version of Santa Claus called Naughty Santa Claus, on a mission to save Christmas.

== Specials (2020–23) ==
Title	Directed by	Written by	Original release date	Prod. code	U.S. viewers (millions)
"The Loud House & Casagrandes Hangin' at Home Special"	Theresa Young	Theresa Young, John Clancy and Andrew Ronald	May 23, 2020	999	0.64
Lincoln and Ronnie Anne have a web chat to catch up about what they've been doing during the COVID-19 pandemic. They also go through fashion fails, the different web chats with their respective friends, Lynn Sr.'s cooking moments, Rosa's cooking moments, different occasions at Gus's Games and Grubs, family vacations, and favorite TV shows. This concludes with a surprise that Ronnie Anne has for Lincoln.
"The Loud House Mega Music Countdown"	Theresa Young	Theresa Young & Andrew Ronald	February 15, 2021	997	0.55
Carlos PenaVega counts down the viewers' 12 favorite songs from The Loud House as well as showing some jam sessions. At #12 is "Stand Together" from "Deep Cuts". At #11 is "Our Amazing Mother" from "Write and Wrong". At #10 is "We Got This" from "Schooled!". At #9 is "Road Trippin' Blues" from "Tripped!". At #8 is "You Got Tricked" from "Tricked!". At #7 is "Best Buds" from "Really Loud Music". At #6 is "Glam Song" from "Really Loud Music". At #5 is "Get Pumped!" from "Really Loud Music". At #4 is "Best Thing Ever" from "Really Loud Music". At #3 is "The Best Dang Brother Anywhere Around" from "Yes Man". At #2 is "That's What Christmas Is All About" from "11 Louds a Leapin'". At #1 is "Play It Loud" from "Really Loud Music".
"Lucy Loud's Halloween Spook-tacular"	Unknown	Unknown	October 22, 2021	796	0.35
Lucy Loud counts down her top 10 spookiest Halloween moments with the Loud Family while reading excerpts about them from her poetry book.
"Lincoln Loud's Holly Jolly Gift Guide"	Unknown	Unknown	December 11, 2021	795	0.27
During the Christmas season, Lincoln attempts to find new gifts for the family while he guides the viewers with gift-giving moments from Christmas specials.
"The Loud House Super Sports Special"	Unknown	Andrew Brooks	January 14, 2022	794	0.38
Lincoln and Clyde host a super sports special on Action News which highlights each of Lynn Loud's athletic moments with footage provided by Lisa.
"The Loud House Thanksgiving Special"	Unknown	Andrew Brooks	November 22, 2022	791	0.24
Clyde hosts his web show "Clyde's Kitchen" with Lincoln as a guest star where they plan the recipe for the perfect Thanksgiving Day dinner with footage of every Thanksgiving and other culinary footage up to now.
"Back to School with Big Nate and The Loud House"	Unknown	Alex Van Der Hoek	September 4, 2023	N/A	0.08
A crossover featuring clips from The Loud House and Big Nate.

== Shorts (2014–23) ==
No.	Title	Directed by	Written by	Storyboard by	Online release date
1	"Bathroom Break!!"	Chris Savino	Chris Savino & Scott Kreamer	Chris Savino	June 5, 2014
Lincoln goes through various obstacles in order to get to the bathroom, including Lori beating him to it.
2	"Slice of Life"	Kyle Marshall	Chris Savino	Jordan Rosato & Kyle Marshall	April 18, 2016
The Loud family has pizza for dinner. As there is one slice left, Lincoln competes with his sisters to determine who should get the final slice.
3	"Deuces Wild"	Kyle Marshall	Chris Savino	Kyle Marshall	July 21, 2017
Lincoln and Clyde get the latest Ace Savvy comic. While enjoying the new comic smell, a gassy scent erupts, which leads to Lincoln and Clyde becoming Ace Savvy and One-Eyed Jack. With the help of the Full House Gang, they uncover the smell and fight a gas monster.
4	"12 Days of Christmas"	Kyle Marshall & Chris Savino	Kevin Sullivan	David Teas	December 16, 2017
Sung in the style of "Twelve Days of Christmas", each of the Loud family members lists off what they want for Christmas.
5	"No End in Bite"	Kyle Marshall	Karla Sakas Shropshire	David Teas	September 28, 2019
When the last page of Lucy's Vampires of Melancholia book is ripped out due to Lynn using it as a makeshift diaper for Lily since the house is out of diapers, Lucy decides to come up with her own ending at Lynn's suggestion where she saves Edwin when his ship is raided by pirates led by Long Beard.
6	"Speaking Sibling"	Jordan Rosato	Chris Savino	David Teas	May 22, 2020
Rita asks Lynn to remind Lincoln to take out the trash. She goes around carrying a message that passes around to each sibling who mishear it because of them being distracted and it coming out in different orders.
7	"So Long Sucker"	Kyle Marshall & Chris Savino	Darin McGowan	David Teas	May 22, 2020
Lynn Sr. gets a robotic vacuum cleaner and its operation keeps disturbing Charles, Cliff, Geo, and Walt. The pets work to get rid of the robotic vacuum cleaner through different ways so that they can relax in peace.
8	"Robot Sitcom"	Jordan Koch	Sammie Crowley & Whitney Wetta	David Teas	May 29, 2020
In this sitcom spoof, Lisa's robot creations Todd from "Making the Grade", Mr. Reinforced Titanium Alloy Arms from "Snow Bored", and FriendBot 1000 from "Friend or Faux" reside in Lisa's bunker, where they get annoyed when the toaster they have as a roommate starts to hog the plug socket and they kick him out. When they get a robotic teddy bear as a new roommate, it becomes a nuisance and even lets Lisa's pet tentacle out of the bunker.
9	"The Maltese Bear"	Sarah Johnson & Jessica Borutski	Sarah Johnson	Nic Parris	June 15, 2020
In this prominently black and white film noir short, Lola discovers that her teddy bear Mr. Sprinkles is missing and appoints Detective Leni to find him since it is where she stashed all of her money. Going around the house, Leni interrogates Luna, Lana, and Charles into finding some clues on who stole Mr. Sprinkles.
10	"Put a Sock in It"	Ari Castleton	Ari Castleton	Nic Parris	June 16, 2020
When Lily starts to cry a lot because Lana ate her booger, she gets entertained upon seeing Lincoln with his hand in a sock. This gives the rest of the siblings an idea to put on a puppet show to entertain Lily.
11	"10 Headed Beast"	Jared Morgan	Jared Morgan	Nic Parris	June 17, 2020
Lincoln and Clyde imagine themselves as barbarians Linc the White-Haired and Calyde of the McBride clan. To satisfy their boredom, they work to obtain an artifact that would enable them to see a lot of things in a black mirror. To get to them, they will have to fight their way past a beast with 10 heads, which is making use of both objects.
12	"King of the Chair"	Ari Castleton & Colton Davis	Colton Davis	George Holguin	June 18, 2020
Lynn Sr. has won a new armchair from Sofa King and does not want any of the kids on it due to them having a history of breaking his past items like a spatula, an exercise bike, and a remote control. When each of the kids ends up on it, they cause more harm and damage to it through different antics and work to hide the different stains and rips from their father.
13	"Clyde's Two Dads"	Miguel Puga	Kevin Sullivan	David Teas	June 19, 2020
Clyde, Howard, and Harold work to coral their cats Cleopawtra and Nepurrtiti so that they can be taken to the vet. They must come up with different tricks to get them into their cat carrier while not getting hurt in the process.
14	"Wet, Lather, & Scrub"	Sarah Johnson & Jessica Borutski	Sarah Johnson	Nic Parris	April 8, 2021
Noticing her classmates disregarding their hygiene during lunch, Lisa explains the danger of germs to them by singing a song about how to prevent them.
15	"Muscle Fish"	Jared Morgan & David King	Jared Morgan & David King	Jared Morgan	August 20, 2021
While watching the "Muscle Fish" marathon, Lincoln and Clyde fall asleep and dream that they encounter Muscle Fish (Diedrich Bader) at Flip's Food & Fuel. When he proves to be too extreme, Flip revokes his VIP access. Lincoln and Clyde work to make Muscle Fish act less extreme. Though this proves to be tough when Muscle Fish's enemy Cephaloplex shows up. Note: This episode aired on YouTube one day before its debut on television.
16	"Robot Reboot"	Jared Morgan	Kiernan Sjursen-Lien	Michelle Hiraishi	June 3, 2022
Wanting to win an important science award called the S.C.R.A.G. (short for Scientific Community Robotic Award and Grant), Lisa goes into her bunker to meet with Todd, Mr. Reinforced Titanium Arms, and FriendBot 1000 to review how they operate with her fellow family members. Lisa finds that the footage showed different results from each outcome as Lisa works to fix their programming with different results.
17	"Super Switcheroo-niverse"	Jared Morgan & David King	David King	David King	June 17, 2022
Lincoln tells the story on how Muscle Fish traversed the different realities in order to go after a ball that was owned by two kids who lost it during one of Cephaloplex's criminal activities. Now he must work to get the ball back to the two kids before he can begin his ceramics class with them.
18	"Right Where We Belong"	Jessica Borutski and Jared Morgan	Doug Rockwell & Michelle Lewis (music and lyrics)	Max Alley & Kevin Cannarile	July 9, 2022
An extended version of the song "Right Where We Belong" from the episode "Save Royal Woods" is shown in music video form. Note: This short aired on the Nicktoons channel.
19	"Flippee Jingle"	Jared Morgan	Jeff Sayers	Michelle Hiraishi	July 9, 2022
An extended version of the "Flippee Jingle" from the episode "Save Royal Woods" is shown in commercial form. When three girls sit down outside of Flip's Food & Fuel needing a drink when their juice is warm, Flip breaks out into a jingle about Flippees with help from Lincoln, his sisters, Clyde, and Nacho. Note: This short aired on the Nicktoons channel.
20	"Trash Grab"	Jared Morgan	Ashley Kliment-Baker	Frank Gildlewski	May 30, 2023
Whenever Lynn Loud Sr. discards what's left for dinner, Charles, Cliff, Geo, and Walt want to have it. This gets complicated when Nacho takes the food and outwits them at every turn. To best Nacho, Charles, Cliff, Geo, and Walt work to trap him. When it works, their victory is complicated when a saddened Flip comes looking for Nacho.
21	"A Crime to Dye For"	Jared Morgan	Megan LeMasurier	Max Alley	July 13, 2023
In this second prominently black and white film noir short (except for some minor colors in it), everyone's clothes have been dyed orange. As Lincoln's trademark color is orange and he was on laundry duty at the time, he is to blame. Detective Leni works to prove Lincoln's innocence by trying to find out who framed him and bring the real culprit or culprits to justice.
