= Negro Labor Committee =

The Negro Labor Committee (NLC) was an organization founded by Frank Crosswaith and others in 1935 to advance African American interests within the American labor movement. It lasted until 1969.

== Founding ==
The Negro Labor Committee was founded in 1935 and was a major step in the advancement of the rights of black workers. It was the successor to a number of organizations founded by Crosswaith, a longtime Socialist Party and labor activist. The first was the American Federation of Labor Trade Union Committee for Organizing Negro Workers, founded in December 1924. Despite being supported by the Central Trades and Labor Council of New York, the group was hampered by the unwillingness of local unions to accept black members and it was apparently defunct by 1926.

In 1934 Crosswaith founded the Harlem Labor Committee, an organization of both black and white workers who sought higher wages, better working conditions and improved benefits. The HLC called the First Negro Labor Conference on July 20, 1935. The meeting of 110 black and white workers voted to create a permanent Negro Labor Committee, which aimed to help African-American find better paying jobs. and to prevent them from being used as labor scabs. The committee also wished to open union membership to African-Americans in localities that had excluded them from membership through clauses in their constitutions, by-laws and rituals or had "covertly discriminate against the Negro worker by practices more eloquent and effective than pronouncements, resolutions, or Constitutions can ever be". Crosswaith was elected chairmen. Other officers included A. Philip Randolph of the Brotherhood of Sleeping Car Porters as Vice Chairman, Thomas Young of the Building Service Employees Union, Julius Hochman of the International Ladies' Garment Workers' Union, Abraham Miller of the Amalgamated Clothing Workers of America, and Morris Feinstone of the United Hebrew Trades, Treasurer, Philip Kapp Joint Board, Dressmakers Union, Financial Secretary, Winifred Gittens also ILGWU, and Organizer Noah A. Walter Jr. of the Laundry Workers Union.

== Activities and goals ==
The committee established the Harlem Labor Center at 312 West 125th Street. This served as a home for the legitimate workers in Harlem for both black and white workers. The committee also created the Negro Labor News Service, which disseminated news throughout the country. In 1941 the NLC was involved in the March on Washington Movement which pressured Franklin D. Roosevelt to create the Fair Employment Practice Committee. In 1946 Crosswaith declared that Harlem had changed from a community of scabs into a community of labor conscious workers.

== Publications ==
- Know your "onions": a message on the Negro in trade unions New York : Negro Labor Committee, 1930s
- The Negro Labor Committee: what it is, and why New York, NY : Arlain Press : Harlem Labor Center, 1935
- First anniversary, the Negro Labor Committee, a year of the most constructive work among negroes since emancipation, 1937. [New York] [publisher not identified], 1937
- Second anniversary, Negro Labor Committee: "two years of the most constructive work among Negroes since emancipation." [New York?] : [Committee?], 1938
- Third anniversary, Negro Labor Committee. New York : Astoria Press, 1939
- Fifth anniversary, the Negro Labor Committee: December 6, 1941. [New York : The committee, 1941?
- 1936–1946: Negro Labor Committee; 10 years of struggle, 10 years of progress. [New York], 1946
- The Negro Labor Committee: its aims-- its gains. New York, N.Y. : Harlem Labor Center, 1953
- Alfred Baker Lewis Progress – at very deliberate speed New York, Negro Labor Committee 1960s

== See also ==
- Jewish Labor Committee
- American Negro Labor Congress
- National Negro Labor Council
- Coalition of Black Trade Unionists
