= Frank Crosswaith =

American socialist and labor leader (1892–1965

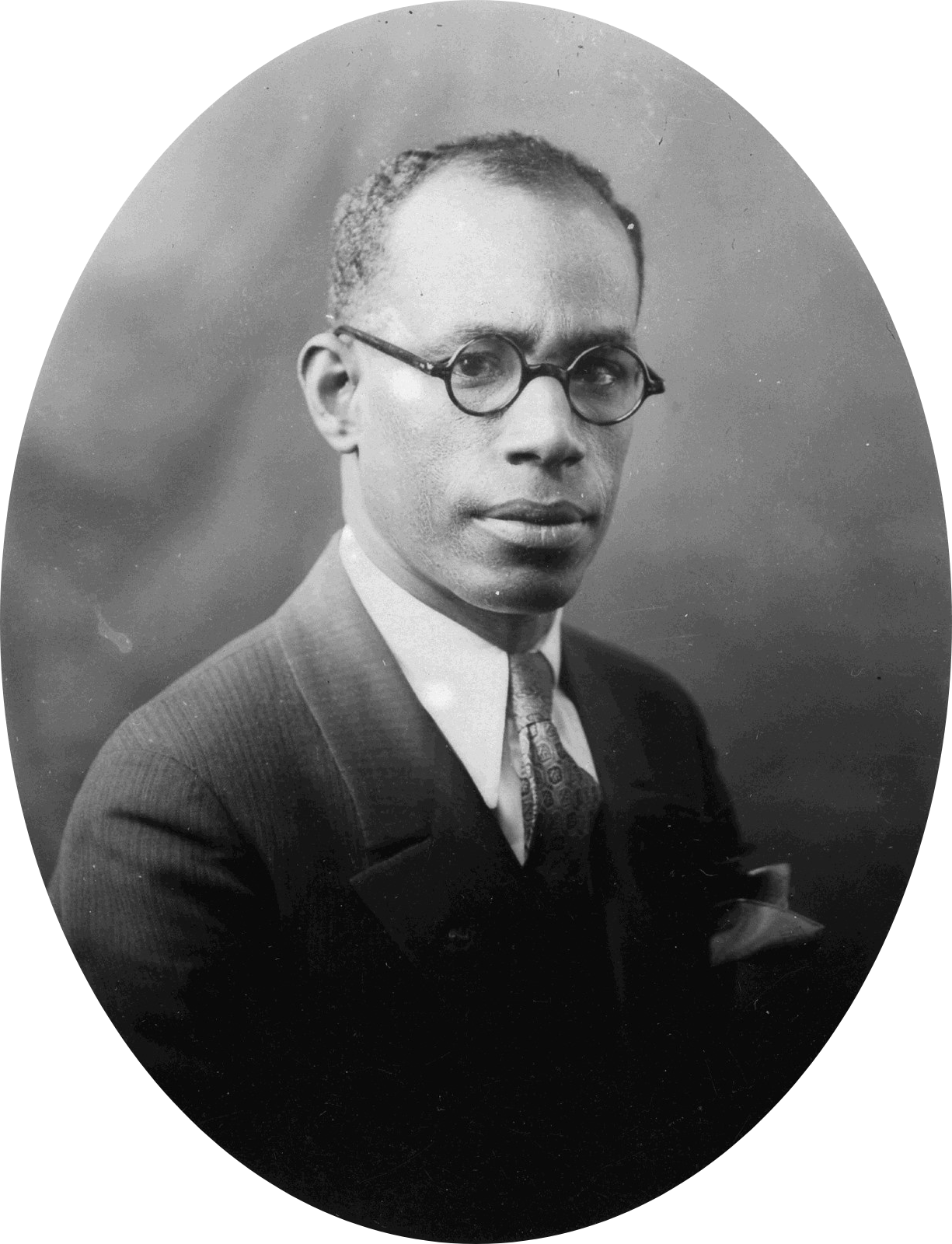
- Crosswaith c. 1933

Chairman of the Negro Labor Committee
- In office July 20, 1935 – June 17, 1965
- Preceded by: Office established
- Succeeded by: L. Joseph Overton

Personal details
- Born: July 16, 1892 Frederiksted, St. Croix, Danish West Indies
- Died: June 17, 1965 (aged 72) New York City, New York, U.S.
- Party: Socialist (before 1939); American Labor (after 1939)
- Spouse: Alma Besard (m. 1915)
- Children: Frank Jr.; Paul; Norris; Olethea
- Occupation: Politician, labor leader

Military service
- Allegiance: United States
- Branch/service: United States Navy
- Years of service: 1907

Frank Rudolph Crosswaith (July 16, 1892 – June 17, 1965) was a West Indian-born American Socialist politician, activist and trade union organizer in New York City who founded and chaired the Negro Labor Committee from 1935 until his death in 1965. He was also appointed the first Black member of the New York City Housing Authority, serving from 1942 to 1958.

== Early life ==
Frank R. Crosswaith was born on July 16, 1892, in Frederiksted, St. Croix, Danish West Indies (the island was sold to the United States in 1917 and became part of the U.S. Virgin Islands). His parents were William I. Crosswaith and Anne Eliza Crosswaith. He emigrated to the United States in his teens. While finishing high school, he worked as an elevator operator, porter and garment worker. He joined the elevator operators' union and when he finished high school, he won a scholarship from the socialist The Jewish Daily Forward to attend the Rand School of Social Science, an educational institute in New York City associated with the Socialist Party of America.

== Career ==
=== Labor career ===
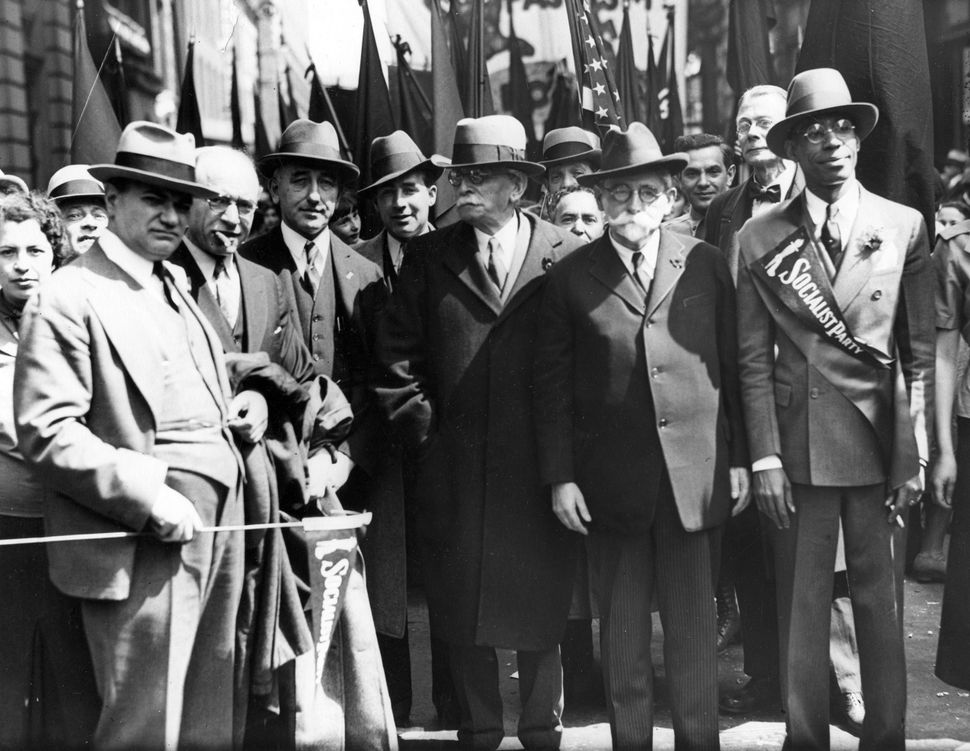
Crosswaith (far right) alongside other prominent socialists, including Max Winter, Abraham Cahan, and William Karlin c. 1920s

Crosswaith founded an organization called the Trade Union Committee for Organizing Negro Workers in 1925, but this work went by the wayside when Crosswaith accepted a position as an organizer for the fledgling Brotherhood of Sleeping Car Porters. Crosswaith maintained a long association with union head A. Philip Randolph, serving with him as officers of the Negro Labor Committee in the 1930s and 1940s.

In the early 1930s Crosswaith worked as an organizer for the International Ladies Garment Workers Union, which became one of the major supporters of the Negro Labor Committee.

In 1934, Crosswaith co-founded and chaired the Harlem Labor Committee (HLC), which he tried to align with the American Federation of Labor (AFL), then seeking African-American members.

On July 20, 1935, the Negro Labor Conference established the Negro Labor Committee, with Crosswaith elected as chairman.

Crosswaith was an anti-communist and believed that the best hope for Black workers in the United States was to join bona fide labor unions just as the best hope for the American labor movement was to welcome Black workers into unions in order to promote solidarity and eliminate the use of Black workers as strikebreakers. He believed strongly that "separation of workers by race would only work to undermine the strength of the entire labor movement." Crosswaith spent much of his energy in the late 1930s and early 1940s battling a rival labor organization called the Harlem Labor Union, Inc., which was run by Ira Kemp and had a Black nationalist philosophy. He accused Kemp of undermining the interests of Black workers by signing agreements with employers that offered them labor at wages below union rates.

Crosswaith also worked with A. Philip Randolph during World War II in organizing the March on Washington Movement, which was called off when President Franklin D. Roosevelt agreed to sign Executive Order 8802, which prohibited racial discrimination in defense industries.

=== Political career ===
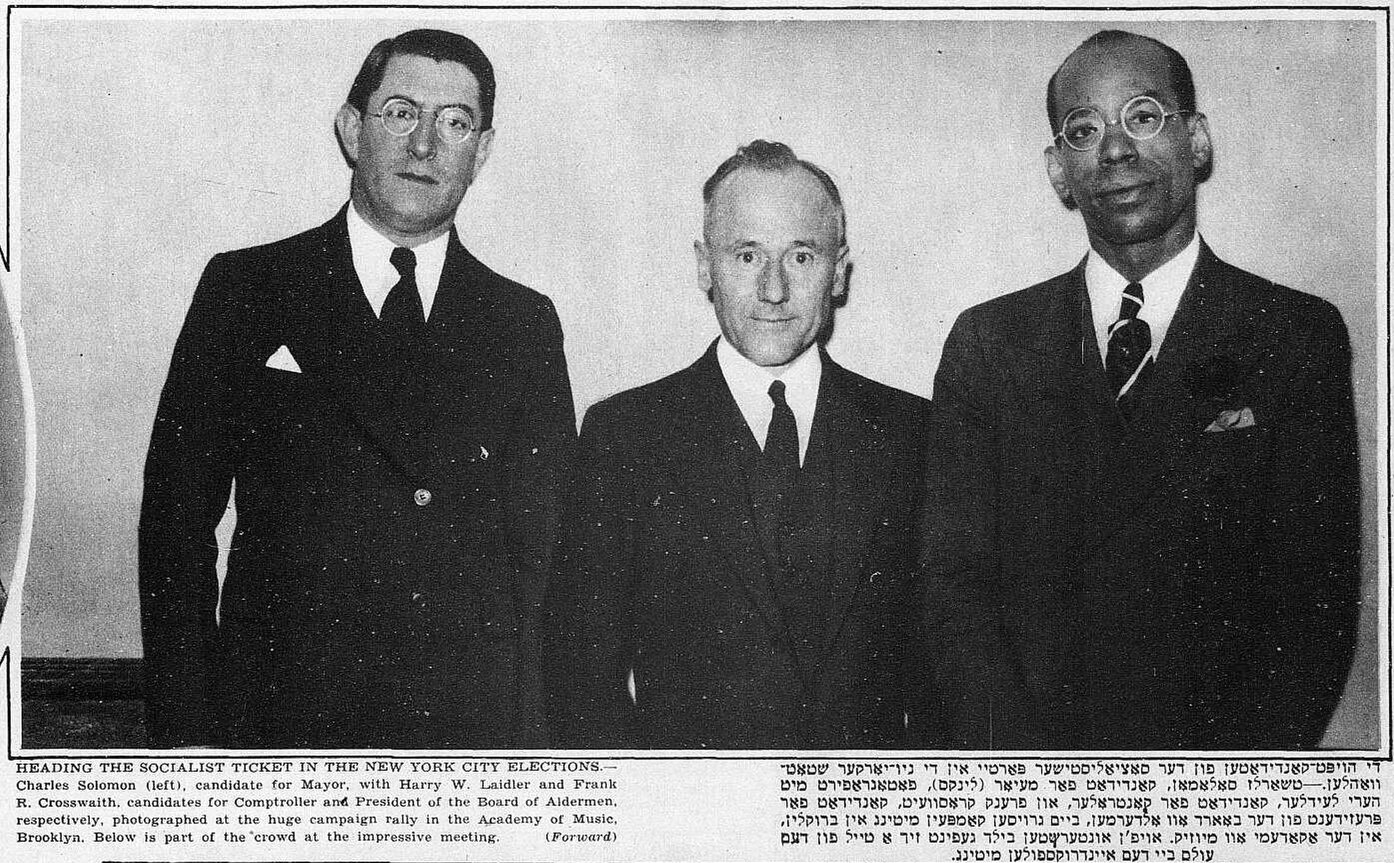
Charles Solomon, Harry W. Laidler, and Crosswaith as Socialist Party candidates for Mayor of New York City, New York City Comptroller, and President of the Board of Aldermen, respectively, 1933

Crosswaith ran for Congress nine times between 1922 and 1940, as well as for Secretary of State of New York in 1924, State Assembly in 1931, President of the Board of Aldermen in 1933, New York City Comptroller in 1937, and New York City Council in 1939. The majority of these were under the Socialist Party ticket, but his run for City Council and his last Congressional run were under the American Labor Party ticket.

In 1942, Crosswaith was appointed by New York City mayor Fiorello La Guardia to the New York City Housing Authority, the first Black man to join the body. He served until 1958.

== Death and legacy ==
Crosswaith died at his home in New York City on June 17, 1965.

Crosswaith was known as the "Negro Debs" (after Eugene V. Debs).

On Crosswaith, Robert Fay wrote: "Crosswaith, a Socialist, sought to ally African American workers with white workers under the banner of class. Thus, he opposed African American leaders who believed in racial alliance alone."

Additional information on Crosswaith may be found in the Negro Labor Committee Records held by the Schomburg Center for Research in Black Culture in New York City.

== Works ==
- When Will It End? New York: Negro Labor News Service, 1929.
- The Negro and Socialism. Chicago: Socialist Party of America, n.d. [c. 1932].
- Know Your 'Onions': A Message on the Negro in Trade Unions. New York: Negro Labor News Service, n.d. [1930s].
- True Freedom for Negro and White Labor. With Alfred Baker Lewis and Norman Thomas. New York: Negro Labor News Service, 1936.
- Discrimination.With Alfred Baker Lewis. New York: Negro Labor News Service, 1942.
- Colored People Have a Stake in the War. (contributor) New York: Committee to Defend America by Aiding the Allies, New York Chapter, n.d. [c. 1942].
- Communists and the Negro. n.c. [New York?]: n.p. [Interracial Review?], n.d. [c. 1943].
