= NAACP Image Award for Outstanding Actor in a Television Movie, Mini-Series or Dramatic Special =

List of awards winners and nominees

This article lists the winners and nominees for the NAACP Image Award for Outstanding Actor in a Television Movie, Mini-Series or Dramatic Special. Currently Blair Underwood holds the record for most wins in this category with four.

== Winners and nominees ==
Winners are listed first and highlighted in bold.

=== 1980s ===
Year	Actor	Movie / Series	Ref
1982
1982	**Paul Winfield**	**The Sophisticated Gents**	
1983
1983	**Howard Rollins**	**For Us the Living: The Medgar Evers Story**	
1984 – 89	—N/a		

=== 1990s ===
Year	Actor	Movie / Series	Ref
1990
1990	**Danny Glover**	**Mandela**	
1991	—N/a		
1992
1992	**Blair Underwood**	**Murder in Mississippi**	
1993
1993	**James Earl Jones**	**Gabriel's Fire**	
1993	Lawrence Hilton-Jacobs	The Jacksons: An American Dream	
1994
1994	**Dorian Harewood**	**I'll Fly Away**	
1995
1995	**Danny Glover**	**Alex Haley's Queen**	
1996
1996	**Laurence Fishburne**	**The Tuskegee Airmen**	
1996	Andre Braugher	The Tuskegee Airmen	
1996	Charles S. Dutton	The Piano Lesson	
1996	Cuba Gooding Jr.	The Tuskegee Airmen	
1996	Sidney Poitier	Children of the Dust	
1997
1997	**Wesley Snipes**	**America's Dream**	
1997	Don Cheadle	Rebound: The Legend of Earl 'The Goat' Manigault	
1997	Louis Gossett Jr.	Captive Heart: The James Mink Story	
1997	Delroy Lindo	Soul of the Game	
1997	Blair Underwood	Soul of the Game	
1998
1998	**Laurence Fishburne**	**Miss Evers' Boys**	
1998	Danny Glover	Buffalo Soldiers	
1998	Carl Lumbly	Buffalo Soldiers	
1998	Sidney Poitier	Mandela and de Klerk	
1998	Ving Rhames	Don King: Only in America	
1999
1999	**Blair Underwood**	**Mama Flora's Family**	
1999	Don Cheadle	The Rat Pack	
1999	Laurence Fishburne	Always Outnumbered	
1999	Leon	The Temptations	
1999	Charles Malik Whitfield	The Temptations	

=== 2000s ===
Year	Actor	Movie / Series	Ref
2000
2000	**Sidney Poitier**	**The Simple Life of Noah Dearborn**	
2000	Obba Babatundé	Introducing Dorothy Dandridge	
2000	Andre Braugher	Passing Glory	
2000	Don Cheadle	A Lesson Before Dying	
2000	Mekhi Phifer	A Lesson Before Dying	
2001
2001	**Danny Glover**	**Freedom Song**	
2001	T. K. Carter	The Corner	
2001	Charles S. Dutton	Deadlocked	
2001	Leon	Littler Richard	
2001	Sean Nelson	The Corner	
2002
2002	**Gregory Hines**	**Bojangles**	
2002	Terrence Howard	Boycott	
2002	Roger Guenveur Smith	A Huey P. Newton Story	
2002	Isaiah Washington	Dancing in September	
2002	Jeffrey Wright	Boycott	
2003
2003	**Charles S. Dutton**	**10,000 Black Men Named George**	
2003	Andre Braugher	10,000 Black Men Named George	
2003	Omar Epps	Conviction	
2003	Harry Lennix	Keep the Faith, Baby	
2003	Ving Rhames	Sins of the Father	
2004
2004	**Charles S. Dutton**	**D.C. Sniper: 23 Days of Fear**	
2004	Ossie Davis	Deacons for Defense	
2004	Danny Glover	Good Fences	
2004	Louis Gossett Jr.	Jasper, Texas	
2004	Forest Whitaker	Deacons for Defense	
2005
2005	**Jamie Foxx**	**Redemption: The Stan Tookie Williams Story**	
2005	Flex Alexander	Man in the Mirror: The Michael Jackson Story	
2005	Yasiin Bey	Something the Lord Made	
2005	Wayne Brady	Going to the Mat	
2005	Dulé Hill	10.5	
2006
2006	**Terrence Howard**	**Lackawanna Blues**	
2006	Michael Ealy	Their Eyes Were Watching God	
2006	Idris Elba	Sometimes in April	
2006	Ruben Santiago-Hudson	Their Eyes Were Watching God	
2006	Jeffrey Wright	Lackawanna Blues	
2007
2007	**Kadeem Hardison**	**Life Is Not a Fairy Tale**	
2007	Andre Braugher	Thief	
2007	Michael Ealy	Sleeper Cell	
2007	Chiwetel Ejiofor	Tsunami: The Aftermath	
2007	Clarence Williams III	Mystery Woman: Wild West Mystery	
2008
2008	**Wendell Pierce**	**Life Support**	
2008	Adam Beach	Bury My Heart at Wounded Knee	
2008	Wayne Brady	The List	
2008	Evan Ross	Life Support	
2008	Daniel Sunjata	The Bronx Is Burning	
2009
2009	**Sean Combs**	**A Raisin in the Sun**	
2009	Andre Braugher	The Andromeda Strain	
2009	Charles S. Dutton	Racing for Time	
2009	Sean Patrick Thomas	A Raisin in the Sun	
2009	Ben Vereen	Accidental Friendship	

=== 2010s ===
Year	Actor	Movie / Series	Ref
2010
2010	**Cuba Gooding Jr.**	**Gifted Hands: The Ben Carson Story**	
2010	Jaishon Fisher	Gifted Hands: The Ben Carson Story	
2010	Gus Hoffman	Gifted Hands: The Ben Carson Story	
2010	Philip Johnson	America	
2010	Eriq La Salle	Relative Stranger	
2011
2011	**Idris Elba**	**Luther**	
2011	Mahershala Ali	The Wronged Man	
2011	Benito Martinez	Lies in Plain Sight	
2011	Jon Seda	The Pacific	
2011	Michael Jai White	One Angry Juror	
2012
2012	**Laurence Fishburne**	**Thurgood**	
2012	Idris Elba	Luther	
2012	Louis Gossett Jr.	The Least Among You	
2012	Samuel L. Jackson	The Sunset Limited	
2012	Esai Morales	We Have Your Husband	
2013
2013	**Cuba Gooding Jr.**	**Firelight**	
2013	Rockmond Dunbar	Raising Izzie	
2013	Tory Kittles	Steel Magnolias	
2013	Afemo Omilami	Steel Magnolias	
2013	Michael Jai White	Somebody's Child	
2014
2014	**Idris Elba**	**Luther**	
2014	Chiwetel Ejiofor	Dancing on the Edge	
2014	Danny Glover	Muhammad Ali's Greatest	
2014	Malik Yoba	Betty & Coretta	
2014	Omari Hardwick	Being Mary Jane	
2015
2015	**Blair Underwood**	**The Trip to Bountiful**	
2015	Charles S. Dutton	Comeback Dad	
2015	Mekhi Phifer	A Day Late and a Dollar Short	
2015	Ving Rhames	A Day Late and a Dollar Short	
2015	Larenz Tate	Gun Hill	
2016
2016	**David Alan Grier**	**The Wiz Live!**	
2016	Idris Elba	Luther	
2016	Cuba Gooding Jr.	The Book of Negroes	
2016	David Oyelowo	Nightingale	
2016	Michael Kenneth Williams	Bessie	
2017
2017	**Courtney B. Vance**	**The People v. O. J. Simpson: American Crime Story**	
2017	Sterling K. Brown	The People v. O. J. Simpson: American Crime Story	
2017	Cuba Gooding Jr.	The People v. O. J. Simpson: American Crime Story	
2017	Malachi Kirby	Roots	
2017	Jeffrey Wright	Confirmation	
2018
2018	**Idris Elba**	**Guerrilla**	
2018	Laurence Fishburne	Madiba	
2018	Bryshere Gray	The New Edition Story	
2018	Woody McClain	The New Edition Story	
2018	Mack Wilds	Shots Fired	
2019
2019	**Michael B. Jordan**	**Fahrenheit 451**	
2019	Brandon Victor Dixon	Jesus Christ Superstar Live in Concert	
2019	John Legend	Jesus Christ Superstar Live in Concert	
2019	Russell Hornsby	Seven Seconds	
2019	Woody McClain	The Bobby Brown Story	

=== 2020s ===
Year	Actor	Movie / Series	Ref
2020
2020	**Jharrel Jerome**	**When They See Us**	
2020	Mahershala Ali	True Detective	
2020	Idris Elba	Luther	
2020	Caleel Harris	When They See Us	
2020	Ethan Henry Herisse	When They See Us	
2021
2021	**Blair Underwood**	**Self Made**	
2021	Chris Rock	Fargo	
2021	Daveed Diggs	Hamilton	
2021	Leslie Odom Jr.	Hamilton	
2021	Nnamdi Asomugha	Sylvie's Love	
2022
2022	**Kevin Hart**	**True Story**	
2022	William Jackson Harper	Love Life	
2022	Anthony Mackie	Solos	
2022	Jaden Michael	Colin in Black & White	
2022	Wesley Snipes	True Story	
2023
2023	**Morris Chestnut**	**The Best Man: The Final Chapters**	
2023	Samuel L. Jackson	The Last Days of Ptolemy Grey	
2023	Terrence Howard	The Best Man: The Final Chapters	
2023	Trevante Rhodes	Mike	
2023	Wendell Pierce	Don't Hang Up	
2024	Brian Tyree Henry	Class of '09	
2024	Courtney B. Vance	Heist 88	
2024	**Keith Powers**	**The Perfect Find**	
2024	Lance Reddick	The Caine Mutiny Court–Martial	
2024	Samuel L. Jackson	Secret Invasion	

== Multiple wins and nominations ==
=== Wins ===
4 wins

- Blair Underwood

3 wins

- Idris Elba
- Laurence Fishburne
- Danny Glover

2 wins

- Charles S. Dutton
- Cuba Gooding Jr.

=== Nominations ===
7 nominations

- Idris Elba

6 nominations

- Charles S. Dutton
- Danny Glover

5 nominations

- Andre Braugher
- Laurence Fishburne
- Cuba Gooding Jr.
- Blair Underwood

3 nominations

- Don Cheadle
- Louis Gossett Jr.
- Terrence Howard
- Samuel L. Jackson
- Sidney Poitier
- Ving Rhames
- Jeffrey Wright

2 nominations

- Mahershala Ali
- Wayne Brady
- Michael Ealy
- Chiwetel Ejiofor
- Leon
- Woody McClain
- Mekhi Phifer
- Wendell Pierce
- Wesley Snipes
- Courtney B. Vance
- Michael Jai White
