= 10,000 Black Men Named George =

2002 American television film

- Written by: Cyrus Nowrasteh
- Directed by: Robert Townsend
- Starring: Andre Braugher; Charles S. Dutton; Mario Van Peebles
- Theme music composer: Stephen James Taylor
- Original language: English

Production
- Producer: Michelle Mundy
- Cinematography: Edward J. Pei
- Editors: Katina Zinner; Peter Zinner
- Running time: 95 minutes
- Production companies: Dufferin Gate Productions; Paramount Television

Original release
- Network: Showtime
- Release: February 24, 2002

10,000 Black Men Named George is a 2002 Showtime TV movie about A. Philip Randolph and his coworkers Milton P. Webster and Ashley Totten. The title refers to the custom of the time when Pullman porters, all of whom were black, were addressed as "George"; a sobriquet for George Pullman, who owned the company that built the sleeping cars (and other railroad cars) and the industry.

== Plot ==
The film follows union activist A. Philip Randolph's efforts to organize the black porters of the Pullman Company in 1920s America, known as the Brotherhood of Sleeping Car Porters. The effort was intertwined with the election of Franklin D. Roosevelt as President of the United States. The American Federation of Labor chartered The Brotherhood of Sleeping Car Porters, which made it the first African-American led union to be so recognized.

Cyrus Nowrasteh won the Pen USA West Literary Award for Best Teleplay for its screen writing.

The film is available for free via YouTube.

== Cast ==
- Andre Braugher as A. Philip Randolph
- Charles S. Dutton as Milton P. Webster
- Mario Van Peebles as Ashley Totten
- Brock Peters as Leon Frey
- Carla Brothers as Lucille Randolph
- Kenneth McGregor as Barton Davis
- Ellen Holly as Selena Frey
- Ernestine Jackson as Mrs. Randolph
- Ardon Bess as Morris "Daddy" Moore

== Production ==
The movie was filmed in Toronto, Ontario, Canada.

== Awards and nominations ==
The film was nominated for multiple awards, including the NAACP Image Award for Outstanding Television Movie, Mini-Series or Dramatic Special. Charles S. Dutton won the NAACP Image Award for Outstanding Actor in a Television Movie, Mini-Series or Dramatic Special. Andre Braugher was also nominated in the same category.
At the Black Reel Awards of 2003, Robert Townsend won the Black Reel Award for Outstanding Director, TV Movie or Limited Series and the Black Reel Award for Best Director: Television Movie/Cable, Charles S. Dutton won Best Supporting Actor in a TV Movie or Limited Series, and Andre Braugher was nominated Best Actor in a TV Movie or Limited Series and won Best Actor: T.V. Movie/Cable.

== See also ==
- Brotherhood of Sleeping Car Porters
- Pullman Porter Blues
