= Frank L. Boyd =

African American labor organizer for the Brotherhood of Sleeping Car Porters

Frank Boyd
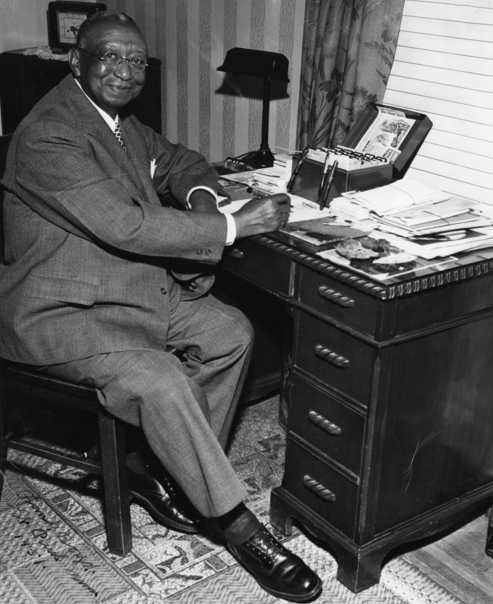
- Boyd in his home on Mackubin Avenue, St. Paul, 1951
- Born: November 17, 1881; Atchison, Kansas
- Died: May 2, 1962 (aged 80); Los Angeles, California
- Monuments: Frank Boyd Park
- Occupation: Labor organizer
- Organization: Brotherhood of Sleeping Car Porters

Frank L. Boyd (November 17, 1881 – May 2, 1962) was an American labor organizer and local leader of the Brotherhood of Sleeping Car Porters from 1926 to 1951 in Minnesota. He was the first African American person in Minnesota to be an elector for the Minnesota Democratic-Farmer-Labor party and also one of the first two African American electors in the history of the Democratic Party.

== Early life ==
Frank L. Boyd was born on November 17, 1881, in Atchison, Kansas, the oldest in a family of four children. His father, Asa, had formerly been enslaved in Kentucky.

Boyd attended school in Kansas for seven years, and moved to St. Paul, Minnesota, with his wife, Hattie, in 1904. Boyd married Hattie Boyd (née Mengler) in Pottawattamie, Iowa, in 1901.

== Career ==
In St. Paul, Boyd initially worked as a porter in a barbershop. After three years, he was hired as a porter by the Northern Pacific Railroad.

Beginning in March 1907, Boyd worked as a Pullman porter. This involved attending to customers on the Pullman cars, and the all-Black workforce were all required to respond to the name "George" in reference to George Pullman. Shifts often extended up to 24 hours, and porters were granted no overtime pay unless they worked at least 400 hours in a month. Porters also had to supply their own food and uniforms. When Boyd began working, he earned $25 a month minus those deductions.

Though some unions in the early 1900s allowed Black members, the railroad industry, which employed the most people nationwide, did not. In the early 20th century, attempts were made to unionize within the railroads, but failed due to factors such as discrimination within the AFL, corporate union busting, and a lack of resources for organizers.

== Union organizer ==
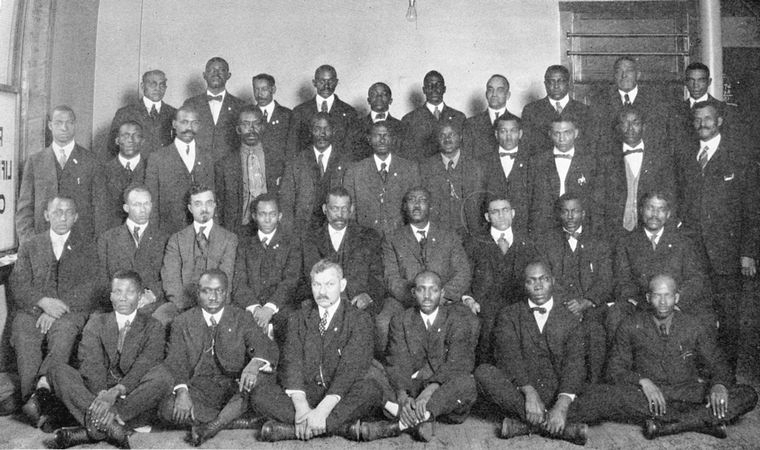
Officers of the Railway Men's International Benevolent Industrial Association (1922)

Boyd first participated in a labor organizing effort in 1909, followed by another attempt in 1910. In 1912, he signed a wage-increase petition circulated among Pullman porters that called to double their monthly wages from $25 to $50, and to raise them to $60 after two years on the job. As a result of this petition, however, the Pullman Company only raised wages by $2.50. One of the first major organizing efforts came in 1918, when the Railway Men's International Benevolent Industrial Association was organized by porters from the Chicago, Milwaukee, and Saint Paul Railroad. This group aimed to represent workers from the entire railroad industry. Boyd was an active member of this group, and helped to organize the local chapter, which elected George Shannon as its president. However, the union ultimately proved unsuccessful, as were efforts to obtain AFL recognition.

== Brotherhood of Sleeping Car Porters ==
In October 1919, Boyd served as a delegate for the Brotherhood of Sleeping Car Porters Protective Union conference in Chicago, Illinois. This group, which had been formed in New York in 1919, laid the foundations for the later union. In 1921, lacking other representation, Boyd joined the Pullman company's union, the Pullman Porters Benefit Association, and was a local officer for five years, chairing the local committee and sitting on the Central Zone General Committee.

Meanwhile, the Brotherhood of Sleeping Car Porters was founded in Harlem, New York, by A. Philip Randolph and Milton Webster in 1925. Concurrently, in August 1925 Boyd began organizing a group of local porters and in September 1925, he formally left the Benefit Association, posting his resignation letter in the porter's room at the St. Paul depot. This served to increase awareness of his newly formed local. Despite warnings from management, by January 1926, Boyd established what would become the local branch of the Brotherhood of Sleeping Car Porters in St. Paul, and A.W. Jordan was elected its first president. Local #3 had its first meetings on 13 and 14 January 1926 at the Welcome Hall on Farrington and St. Anthony Streets in the Rondo neighborhood of St. Paul; more than 50 men attended. After this point, Boyd no longer received work as a Pullman porter and for the next decades served as an unpaid organizer for the BSCP, primarily in the role of secretary-treasurer. He also briefly worked as a meatpacker at the Armour Meat Packing Plant.

In February 1926, A. Philip Randolph and Ashley Totten spoke at the St. James A.M.E. Church in St. Paul about the unions, and spoke to employees of the Soo Line Railroad in Minneapolis, which endorsed the Brotherhood. At this point, the Local #3 was holding weekly meetings at the Hallie Q. Brown House and the Ober Boys Club.

Also around 1926, a Colored Women's Economic Council was established in St. Paul to support the BSCP, and its first meeting was held at the Young Women's Christian Association branch at 508 West Central Avenue with Della Roberts as its leader. Frank Boyd's wife, Minnie Boyd, was also among the leaders of this group, serving as secretary-treasurer. The St. Paul chapter helped to draft the constitution of what would become the Women's Economic Council/Ladies Auxiliary of the BSCP as a whole.

The BSCP did not gain congressional recognition until 1935, and in 1937 the union signed a collective bargaining contract that included wage increases and overtime pay. By 1950 Local #3 had more than 700 members. Over the course of his work with the BSCP, Boyd also helped create a petition calling for living wage pay for Pullman porters that was sent to the Interstate Commerce Commission, and served on the organization's International Executive Board.

== Later political activities ==
During his organizing career, Boyd was also a member of the St. Paul NAACP chapter and the National Urban League. In 1941, Boyd served as the Minnesota chairman for the St. Paul NAACP chapter's "On to Washington" advisory committee" in support of A. Philip Randolph's "100,000 Negroes" March on Washington.

In 1944, he was also named one of 11 presidential electors for the Minnesota DFL party. This accomplishment meant Boyd was the first African American elector in Minnesota and one of the first two African American electors for the Democratic Party nationwide. In January 1945, Boyd attended Franklin Delano Roosevelt's inauguration ceremony as a member of the electoral college.

Boyd retired as secretary-treasurer of Local #3 after 26 years of service in 1951. His retirement gala was held on December 4, 1951, at the St. Paul Hotel, and A. Philip Randolph spoke at the event.

Boyd died on May 2, 1962, in Los Angeles, California.

== Legacy ==
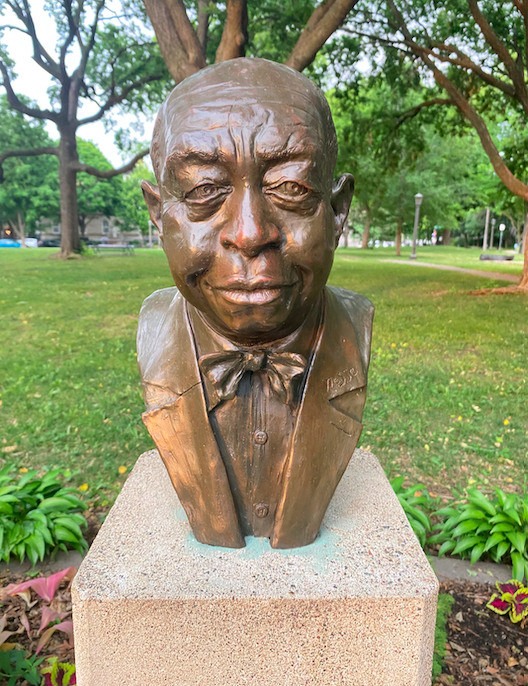
Statue of Frank Boyd in Frank Boyd Park

Frank Boyd Park is located on the north side of Selby Avenue between Virginia and Farrington Streets, in St. Paul, Minnesota. On May 1, 1976, the Ramsey Hill Association formally dedicated Frank Boyd Park. The Association had previously proposed to name the park after entrepreneur Norman Kittson, but the Selby-Dale Freedom Brigade proposed Boyd as an alternative namesake.

A bust of Boyd by the artist J. Paul Nesse stands in the park with a plaque that reads "A Fighter For / His Union / His People / His Class."
