= Milton P. Webster =

American trade unionist (1887–1965)

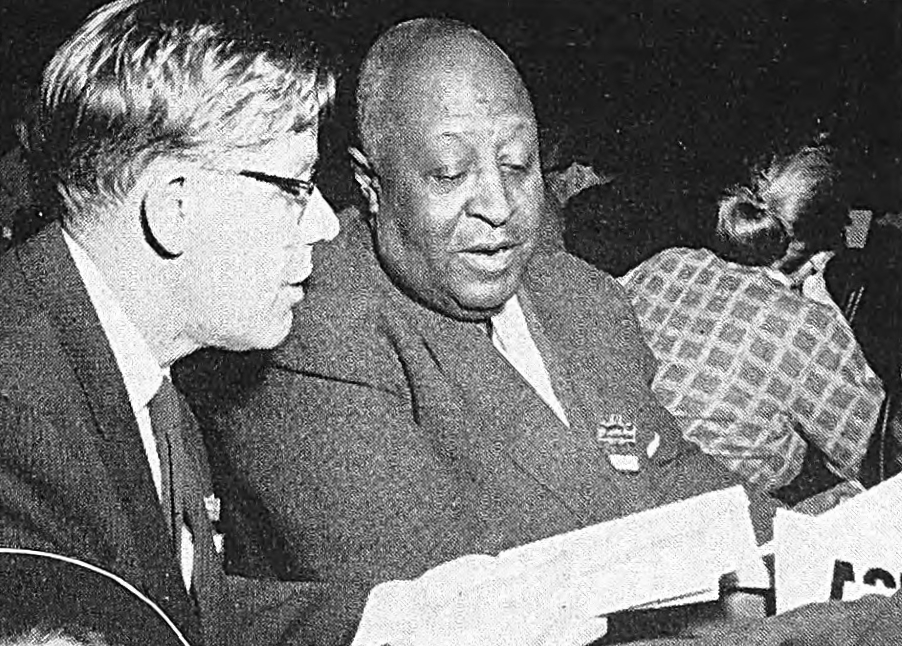
- Webster (right) and H. L. Mitchell at the AFL-CIO's second annual convention, December 1957
- Born: April 23, 1887; Clarksville, Tennessee, U.S.
- Died: February 24, 1965 (aged 77)
- Known for: Brotherhood of Sleeping Car Porters

Milton Price Webster (April 23, 1887 – February 24, 1965) was an American trade unionist, best remembered as the first vice president of the Brotherhood of Sleeping Car Porters and leader of its Chicago division. As the union's lead negotiator, Webster was influential in securing a collective bargaining agreement with the Pullman Company – the first national contract won by any black-led American trade union.

During the years of World War II, Webster was appointed by President Franklin D. Roosevelt as a member of the Fair Employment Practice Committee and its successor commission, working to end racial discrimination in the defense industry. Their work helped open access to jobs for black workers, desegregating the work forces in industries with federal contracts that supplied the war effort.

Webster also later served as a member of the International Board of the American Federation of Labor.

== Early years ==
Milton Price Webster was born on April 23, 1887, in Clarksville, Tennessee. His father, Willis, was a barber who owned land in Clarksville with a small farm. His mother, Mary, was the daughter of freed black Tennesseans (Julia (Donaldson) and Robert Fogg). Both of Mary's parents attended a fledgling Fisk University at its inception, and her father fought for the Union Army in the Civil War.

The Websters moved to the booming metropolis of Chicago when Milton was a young child. The move was forced by Southern nationalist backlash against freedmen and women after Reconstruction, with threats and actions that induced financial hardship, beatings, and lynchings for many Black residents across the South. The Webster family was not immune to these threats and attacks. The family was of humble beginnings, but very close. His mother Mary and father Willis, along with his maternal grandmother Julia Donaldson Fogg and his siblings, moved to a segregated South Side of Chicago. It was a large close family of which Milton was the third youngest of 11 children. One of Milton's earliest memories was of his witnessing of the Pullman Strike in 1894 first hand from his parents tenement apartment window, as white railroad strikers where beaten and shot by US Marshals and US Army Troops. This affected Milton immensely. In later years he would lament that if US troops would treat white union organizers so heinously, he could only imagine what they would do to black union men.

Although Milton was an excellent student and a voracious reader, with a desire to pursue the study of law, the family did not have the resources to send him to the university. He had may odd jobs, eventually obtaining work as a Pullman porter, a job which he held for nearly 18 years. He left the job in April 1924 following a dispute with an official of the Chicago & Northwestern Railroad, for which he worked. This passion for law would serve him well in his vocation as a labor organizer.

As a porter Webster appreciated first hand the injustices levied upon the worker, the excessive work days on the rail, poor pay, burdensome tolls and fees, undue and uneven disciplinary actions against porters and maids, the weeks and months of being on the rail with no time off, the unsafe work conditions, the lack of any workers rights or advocacy, and the overt racism faced day in and day out by fellow porters and maids. While still employed as a porter, Webster decided that a Labor Union was what was needed for black workers and he, with a few others, began organizing. The Pullman company got wind of his actions and began citing him for disciplinary actions, while trying to force him to disband his efforts, quit, or be fired. Milton quit, but continued organizing porters to form a union to advocate for workers rights for Pullman porters and maids.

After leaving the railroad, Webster took a job as an assistant bailiff at the Chicago Municipal Court, later working for the Republican Party as a political functionary in that same city.

He married Louie Elizabeth Harris of Cassopolis, Michigan, and they had three children, Milton Price II (JD), Rebecca Estelle (Kingslow), and Jean.

== Brotherhood of Sleeping Car Porters official ==
The Brotherhood of Sleeping Car Porters (BSCP) was founded in 1925. At its inception, Webster recruited A. Philip Randolph to serve as the President and chief spokesman of the newly formed union. Webster served as the first Vice President and head of the unions largest division, in his home town of Chicago. As the location of Pullman's headquarters and the largest population of maids and porters, Chicago was an important city to the fledgling union, and Webster's experience as an influential member of the city's Republican Party made him well-situated for the role.

In the months after the union's formation, Webster worked to recruit more members. He was opposed by the Pullman Company, which had invested heavily in Chicago's Black community, engaged in anti-union practices, and recruited informants ("stool pigeons") to report any labor organization activity.

As First Vice President of the BSCP and Chair of the International Executive Board, Webster handled most of the routine work of the union, while Randolph served as the public face.

== Civil rights work ==
Fair Employment Practice Committee Pinback

On June 25, 1941, President Franklin D. Roosevelt signed Executive Order 8802, prohibiting racial discrimination in the defense industry and establishing the Fair Employment Practice Committee (FEPC). Roosevelt was pushed into action by head of the BSCP, A. Philip Randolph, who had been instrumental in organizing the March on Washington Movement (MOWM), which had planned to demonstrate in the nation's capital later in 1941 unless action to end racial discrimination was taken.

Webster, a key organizer of the march, lead its powerful Chicago headquarters and helped it emerge as a national mass movement for jobs and justice for black Americans during World War II. The National Committee of the MOWN, expecting that the FEPC would be largely involved with trade union affairs and thus needed an effective and experienced negotiator, selected Milton Webster as their nominee and he was appointed by Roosevelt to the FEPC.

In the context of relatively weak traditional political power, MOWM was in the vanguard of a wartime trend in which the number of African Americans in defense industries rose from 8.4 percent to 12.5 percent. Randolph and Webster recognized that E.O. 8802 and FEPC were far from adequate implements to annihilate racial inequality, but it was understood that this was the most Roosevelt was prepared to offer.

The FEPC would hold a series of public hearings on racial discrimination in Los Angeles, Chicago, New York City, and Birmingham, Alabama but suffered from a lack of support from the White House for perceived overreach in attempting to end racial discrimination across all government agencies. In an effort to dodge potential racial conflict and its political ramifications, in July Roosevelt moved the FEPC from independent status under Presidential supervision to the direction of the War Manpower Commission, headed by Paul V. McNutt.

Only through the concerted pressure of black leaders would Roosevelt be forced to return the committee to the Executive office from the War Department. Roosevelt's signing of Executive Order 9346 in May 1943 restructured the FEPC as the President's Committee on Fair Employment (remembered to historians as the "Second President's Committee"). Webster's talent and worth in the position was recognized as he was the only person from the original FEPC retained on the 7-member committee following its 1943 reorganization.

== Death and legacy ==
Milton Webster died unexpectedly on February 24, 1965, at the Americana Hotel in Bar Harbour, Florida while attending an AFL-CIO convention with A. Philip Randolph. He was survived by his wife of over 40 years Louie Elizabeth (Harris) Webster formerly of Cassopolis, Michigan, and three children Milton II (Jean Young), Rebecca (Harry Kingslow, MD), and Jean; and 7 grandchildren Milton Webster(III), Steven Webster, Margot Webster Jones(JD), Marcia Kingslow, Janet Webster, Harry Kingslow(II), and Leslie Kingslow(MD).
