= Mozart Mimms =

Mozart Mimms (April 30, 1918-March 18, 2023) was a Canadian-American trade unionist.

Born in 1918 in Allensville, Kentucky, he was the youngest of 8 children. His parents were tobacco farmers and his grandparents had been held in slavery. He grew up in segregated Kentucky and spent four years in the U.S. Army during World War II. After the war, he earned a degree from Tennessee State University.

Mimms emigrated to British Columbia and began working in Vancouver in 1952 as a sleeping car porter with the Canadian Pacific Railway. Mimms spent decades as a leader in the Brotherhood of Sleeping Car Porters, including the union's president. As of 2020, he was living at Royal City Manor Long Term Care in New Westminster. In 2022, at the age of 104, Unifor honoured Mimms at their annual convention with the Neil Reimer Award. He died in March 2023.
