= Andre Braugher =

American actor (1962–2023)

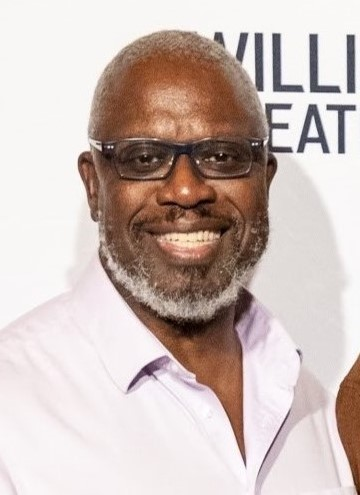
- Braugher in 2019
- Born: Andre Keith Braugher; July 1, 1962; Chicago, Illinois, U.S.
- Died: December 11, 2023 (aged 61); South Orange, New Jersey, U.S.
- Education: Stanford University (BA); Juilliard School (GrDip)
- Occupation: Actor
- Years active: 1988–2023
- Spouse: Ami Brabson (m. 1991)
- Children: 3

Andre Keith Braugher (/ˈbraʊər/ BROW-ər; July 1, 1962 – December 11, 2023) was an American actor known for his roles as Detective Frank Pembleton in the NBC police drama series Homicide: Life on the Street (1993–1999) and Captain Raymond Holt in the Fox/NBC police comedy series Brooklyn Nine-Nine (2013–2021). He won two Primetime Emmy Awards and was nominated for two Golden Globe Awards.

Braugher started his acting career as part of The Public Theater's Shakespeare in the Park, appearing in Much Ado About Nothing, Coriolanus, Twelfth Night, Hamlet, and As You Like It. He transitioned his career into television, gaining roles in Kojak (1989–1990), The Court-Martial of Jackie Robinson (1990), and The Tuskegee Airmen (1995), followed by leading roles in the ABC medical series Gideon's Crossing (2000–2001), the CBS crime series Hack (2002–2004), the FX crime miniseries Thief (2006) and the TNT comedy series Men of a Certain Age (2009–2011). He also had supporting roles in series such as The Good Fight (2022), New Girl (2011–2018), and BoJack Horseman (2014–2020).

Braugher's film roles include Glory (1989), Primal Fear (1996), City of Angels (1998), Frequency (2000), Duets (2000), Poseidon (2006), The Mist (2007), Fantastic Four: Rise of the Silver Surfer (2007), Salt (2010), The Gambler (2014), and She Said (2022).

== Early life ==
Andre Braugher was born in Chicago on July 1, 1962, the son of Sally and Floyd Braugher, a postal worker and heavy-equipment operator. Braugher had three older siblings and was raised in the Austin neighborhood of Chicago. He attended St. Ignatius College Prep for high school and earned a scholarship to attend Stanford University. Initially majoring in engineering, Braugher found that he enjoyed acting and graduated with a BA in theatre in 1984. He then attended the Juilliard School's Drama Division, graduating in 1988.

== Career ==
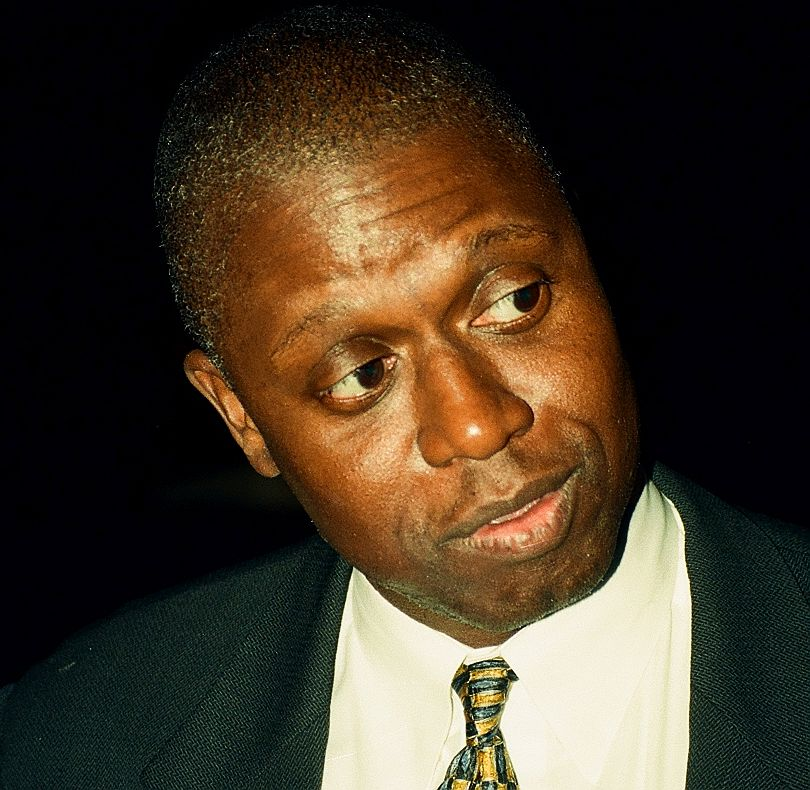
Braugher in 1996

Braugher's first film role was in the 1989 film Glory as Thomas Searles, a free, educated black man from the North who joins the first black regiment in the Union Army. He played Kojak's sidekick in the late 1980s ABC television film revival of Kojak. He subsequently moved on to a role on the television series Homicide: Life on the Street as Detective Frank Pembleton, a self-righteous, fiery, unyielding, Jesuit-educated police detective. Braugher won Television Critics Association awards for individual achievement in drama in 1997 and 1998. He was nominated for a Primetime Emmy Award for Outstanding Lead Actor in a Drama Series in 1996 and 1998, winning in the latter year. He left Homicide after its sixth season but returned for the reunion television film. He also co-starred in the films City of Angels, Frequency, and Poseidon.

In 1997, he was selected by People as one of the "50 Most Beautiful People in the World".

As part of the Shakespeare in the Park series at the Delacorte Theater in New York City's Central Park, Braugher played the title role in the 1996 production of Henry V, for which he received an Obie Award. In 2000, he played the title role as Ben Gideon in the series Gideon's Crossing, which lasted one season. In 2002, Braugher narrated the award-winning, PBS-broadcast documentary Muhammad: Legacy of a Prophet, produced by Unity Productions Foundation. He narrated The Murder of Emmett Till for PBS. He played Detective Marcellus Washington in the TV series Hack from 2002 to 2004.

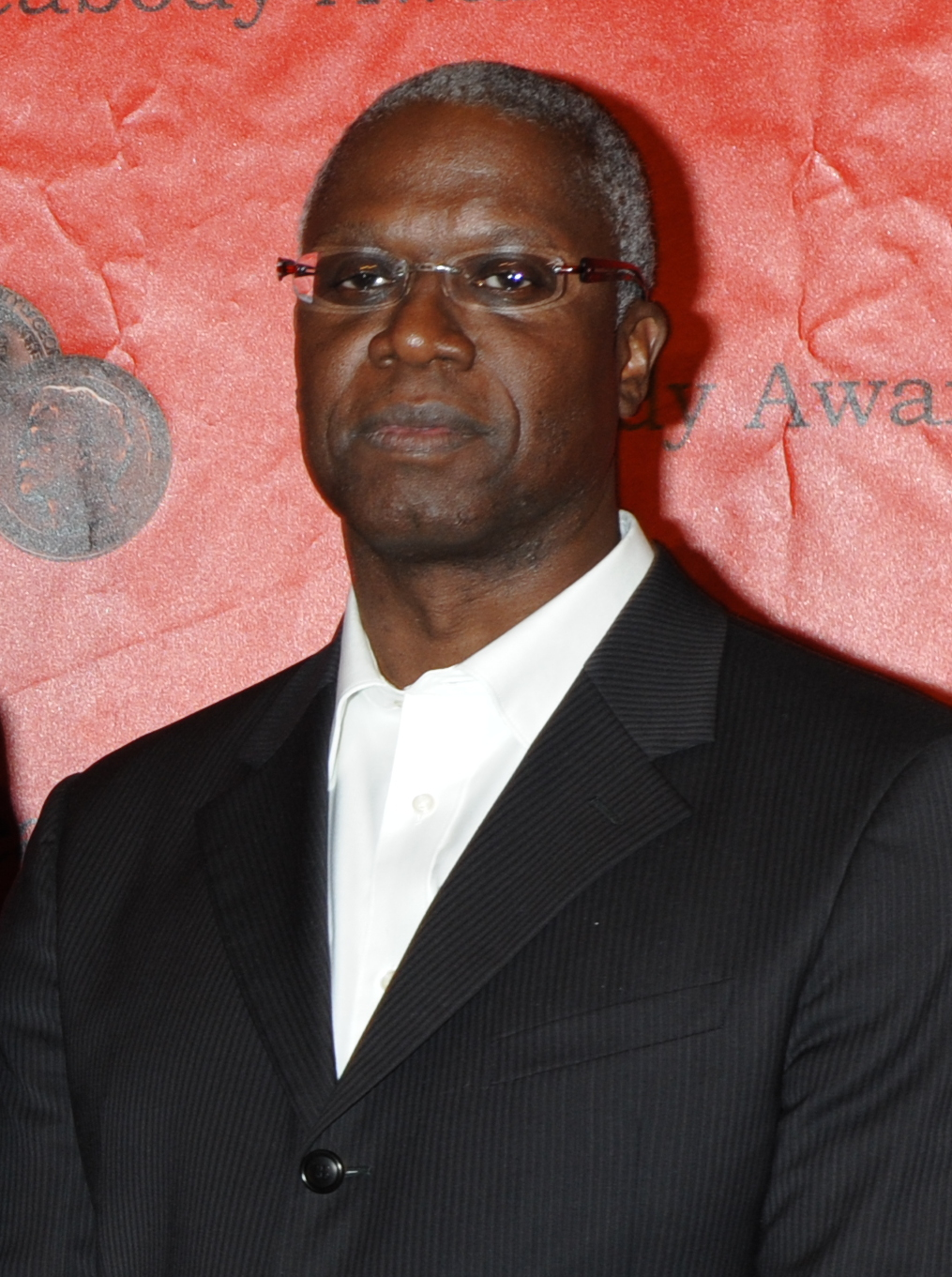
Braugher in May 2011

In 2006, Braugher starred as Nick Atwater in the miniseries Thief for FX Networks, winning a second Emmy for his performance. He portrayed General Hager in the 2007 film Fantastic Four: Rise of the Silver Surfer. Braugher appeared on the TV series House, M.D. as Dr. Darryl Nolan, a psychiatrist who helps House recover from his addiction to Vicodin. He also appeared in the TNT series Men of a Certain Age, for which he was nominated twice as Primetime Emmy Award for Outstanding Supporting Actor in a Drama Series. He also voiced the villain Darkseid in the animated film, Superman/Batman: Apocalypse. He took supporting roles in the science fiction film The Mist (2007), the mystery film Passengers (2008), and the action thriller Salt (2010).

Braugher acted in the Manhattan Theatre Club's production of the Matthew Lopez play The Whipping Man, off-Broadway, for a limited run from January–March 2011. Braugher co-starred alongside Andre Holland. Marilyn Stasio of Variety described the play as "genuinely moving and Braugher captures the moment with his thrilling evocation of Simon's pride and joy and hope". He narrated the introduction to the Olympic Games on NBC from 2006 to 2010. Braugher narrated James Patterson's Alex Cross book Cross Fire (2010).

Braugher had a recurring role as defense attorney Bayard Ellis on Law & Order: Special Victims Unit from 2011 to 2015, and starred as the lead character, Capt. Marcus Chaplin, in ABC's 2012 military drama TV series Last Resort. In 2017, Braugher had a recurring role in season four of the Netflix animated series BoJack Horseman as California Governor Woodchuck Coodchuck-Berkowitz. From 2013 to 2021, he starred in the Golden Globe-winning TV series Brooklyn Nine-Nine as the precinct captain, Raymond Holt. For his performance in Brooklyn Nine-Nine, he was nominated for four Primetime Emmy Awards for Outstanding Supporting Actor in a Comedy Series. Braugher was cast as Chief Usher A. B. Wynter in Netflix's The Residence, but he died after more than half his scenes had been filmed resulting in the role having to be recast and refilmed.

== Personal life and death ==
In 1991, Braugher married actress Ami Brabson, who later appeared as Frank Pembleton's wife Mary in Homicide: Life on the Street. They had three sons, Michael, Isaiah, and John Wesley, and lived in New Jersey.

Braugher died on December 11, 2023, at the age of 61. His death was attributed to lung cancer, with which he had been diagnosed a few months prior. Braugher had previously been a smoker, but quit in 2010. Following his death, many of his co-stars expressed gratitude for his warmth, kindness, and talent as an actor. The Classical Theatre of Harlem dedicated its 2024 season to Braugher's memory; Braugher had served as vice chairman of the company and had been a longtime trustee.

The Netflix show The Residence was dedicated to Braugher as he had been cast in the role of A. B. Wynter before his death.

== Filmography ==
=== Film ===
Year	Title	Role	Notes	Ref.
1989	Glory	Cpl. Thomas Searles		
1993	Striking Distance	District Attorney		
1996	Primal Fear	Tommy Goodman		
1996	Get on the Bus	Flip		
1998	Thick as Thieves	Dink		
1998	City of Angels	Cassiel		
1999	It's the Rage	Tim		
2000	A Better Way to Die	Cleveland		
2000	Frequency	Satch DeLeon		
2000	Duets	Reggie Kane		
2006	Poseidon	Captain Bradford		
2007	Fantastic Four: Rise of the Silver Surfer	General Hager		
2007	Live!	Don		
2007	The Mist	Brent Norton		
2008	Passengers	Perry		
2010	Superman/Batman: Apocalypse	Darkseid	Voice	
2010	Salt	Secretary of Defense		
2012	The Baytown Outlaws	Millard		
2014	The Gambler	Dean Fuller		
2015	Emily & Tim	Tim	Segment: “Acceptance”	
2021	Spirit Untamed	Al Granger	Voice	
2022	She Said	Dean Baquet		

=== Television ===
Year	Title	Role	Notes	Ref.
1989	Kojak: Ariana	Detective Winston Blake	Television film	
1989	Kojak: Fatal Flaw	Detective Winston Blake	Television film	
1990	Kojak: Flowers for Matty	Detective Winston Blake	Television film	
1990	Kojak: It's Always Something	Detective Winston Blake	Television film	
1990	Murder in Mississippi	Dennis	Television film	
1990	Kojak: None so Blind	Detective Winston Blake	Television film	
1990	Somebody Has to Shoot the Picture	Dan Weston	Television film	
1990	The Court-Martial of Jackie Robinson	Jackie Robinson	Television film	
1993	Class of '61	Lucius	Television film	
1993	Without Warning: Terror in the Towers	Tag	Television film	
1993–1998	Homicide: Life on the Street	Detective Frank Pembleton	98 episodes	
1995	The Tuskegee Airmen	Benjamin O. Davis Jr.	Television film	
1996	Law & Order	Detective Frank Pembleton	Episode: "Charm City"	
1999	Passing Glory	Father Joseph Verrett	Television film	
1999	Love Songs	Ellis	Television film	
2000	Homicide: The Movie	Detective Frank Pembleton	Television film	
2000–2001	Gideon's Crossing	Dr. Ben Gideon	20 episodes	
2000–2001	Jackie Chan Adventures	Derge	Voice, 3 episodes	
2001	Enduring Faith	Narrator	Television film	
2001	The Practice	Dr. Ben Gideon	Episode: "Gideon's Crossover"	
2002	10,000 Black Men Named George	A. Philip Randolph	Television film	(Note: The American Federation of Labor chartered The Brotherhood of Sleeping Car Porters, which made it the first African-American led union to be so recognized. Cyrus Nowrasteh won the Pen USA West Literary Award for Best Teleplay for its screen writing.)
2002–2004	Hack	Marcellus Washington	39 episodes	
2003	American Experience	Narrator	Episode: "The Murder of Emmett Till"	
2003	Soldier's Girl	Sergeant Carlos Diaz	Television film	
2004	Salem's Lot	Matt Burke	2 episodes	
2006	Thief	Nick Atwater	6 episodes	
2008	The Andromeda Strain	General George W. Mancheck	4 episodes	
2009–2011	Men of a Certain Age	Owen Thoreau Jr.	22 episodes	
2009–2012	House	Dr. Darryl Nolan	4 episodes	
2010	Miami Medical	Dr. William Rayner	Episode: "Pilot"	
2011–2015	Law & Order: Special Victims Unit	Bayard Ellis	6 episodes	
2012–2013	Last Resort	Captain Marcus Chaplin	13 episodes	
2012–2023	American Experience	Narrator	4 episodes	
2013–2021	Brooklyn Nine-Nine	Captain Raymond Holt	Main role; 153 episodes	
2015	Axe Cop	Lobster Man	Voice, episode: "The Center of the Ocean"	
2016	New Girl	Captain Raymond Holt	Episode: "Homecoming"	
2017	BoJack Horseman	Woodchuck Coodchuck-Berkowitz	Voice, 4 episodes	
2019	Live in Front of a Studio Audience	James Evans	Episode: "'All in the Family' and 'Good Times'"	
2022	The Good Fight	Ri'Chard Lane	Main role (season 6)	
2025	Sausage Party: Foodtopia	General Owens	Voice, episode: "Sixteenth Course"; posthumously	

== Theatre ==
Year	Title	Role	Venue	Ref.
1988	Much Ado About Nothing	Benedick / Ensemble	Delacorte Theater, Shakespeare in the Park	
1988	King John	English Herald / Messenger	Delacorte Theater, Shakespeare in the Park	
1989	Coriolanus	Junius Brutus	Anspacher Theatre, The Public Theater	
1989	Twelfth Night	Antonio	Delacorte Theater, Shakespeare in the Park	
1993	Measure for Measure	Angelo	Delacorte Theater, Shakespeare in the Park	
1994	The Tragedy of Richard II	Henry Bolingbroke	Anspacher Theatre, The Public Theater	
1996	Henry V	King Henry V	Delacorte Theater, The Public Theater	
2008	Hamlet	Claudius	Delacorte Theater, The Public Theater	
2011	The Whipping Man	Simon	Manhattan Theatre Club	
2012	As You Like It	Duke Senior / Duke Frederick	Delacorte Theater, The Public Theater	
2019	A Human Being, of a Sort	Smokey	Williamstown Theater Festival	

== Awards and nominations ==
Year	Association	Category	Nominated work	Result	Ref.
1995	Viewers for Quality Television	Best Actor in a Quality Drama Series	Homicide: Life on the Street	Won	
1996	CableACE Awards	Actor in a Movie or Miniseries	The Tuskegee Airmen	Nominated	
1996	NAACP Image Awards	Outstanding Lead Actor in a Drama Series	Homicide: Life on the Street	Nominated	
1996	NAACP Image Awards	Outstanding Lead Actor in a Miniseries or a Movie	The Tuskegee Airmen	Nominated	
1996	Primetime Emmy Awards	Outstanding Lead Actor in a Drama Series	Homicide: Life on the Street	Nominated	
1996	Primetime Emmy Awards	Outstanding Supporting Actor in a Miniseries or a Movie	The Tuskegee Airmen	Nominated	
1997	NAACP Image Awards	Outstanding Lead Actor in a Drama Series	Homicide: Life on the Street	Won	
1997	Satellite Awards	Best Actor – Television Series Drama	Homicide: Life on the Street	Won	
1997	Television Critics Association Awards	Individual Achievement in Drama	Homicide: Life on the Street	Won	
1998	NAACP Image Awards	Outstanding Lead Actor in a Drama Series	Homicide: Life on the Street	Nominated	
1998	Primetime Emmy Awards	Outstanding Lead Actor in a Drama Series	Homicide: Life on the Street	Won	
1998	Television Critics Association Awards	Individual Achievement in Drama	Homicide: Life on the Street	Won	
1998	Viewers for Quality Television	Best Actor in a Quality Drama Series	Homicide: Life on the Street	Nominated	
1999	NAACP Image Awards	Outstanding Lead Actor in a Drama Series	Homicide: Life on the Street	Nominated	
1999	NAACP Image Awards	Outstanding Supporting Actor in a Motion Picture	City of Angels	Nominated	
2000	NAACP Image Awards	Outstanding Lead Actor in a Miniseries or a Movie	Passing Glory	Nominated	
2001	Blockbuster Entertainment Awards	Favorite Supporting Actor – Suspense	Frequency	Won	
2001	Golden Globe Awards	Best Actor – Television Series Drama	Gideon's Crossing	Nominated	
2001	NAACP Image Awards	Outstanding Lead Actor in a Drama Series	Gideon's Crossing	Nominated	
2001	Primetime Emmy Awards	Outstanding Lead Actor in a Drama Series	Gideon's Crossing	Nominated	
2002	NAACP Image Awards	Outstanding Lead Actor in a Drama Series	Gideon's Crossing	Nominated	
2003	NAACP Image Awards	Outstanding Lead Actor in a Drama Series	Hack	Nominated	
2003	NAACP Image Awards	Outstanding Lead Actor in a Miniseries or a Movie	10,000 Black Men Named George	Nominated	
2006	Primetime Emmy Awards	Outstanding Lead Actor in a Miniseries or a Movie	Thief	Won	
2006	Satellite Awards	Best Actor – Miniseries or Television Film	Thief	Nominated	
2007	Golden Globe Awards	Best Actor – Miniseries or Television Film	Thief	Nominated	
2007	NAACP Image Awards	Outstanding Lead Actor in a Miniseries or a Movie	Thief	Nominated	
2009	NAACP Image Awards	Outstanding Lead Actor in a Miniseries or a Movie	The Andromeda Strain	Nominated	
2010	Primetime Emmy Awards	Outstanding Supporting Actor in a Drama Series	Men of a Certain Age	Nominated	
2011	NAACP Image Awards	Outstanding Supporting Actor in a Drama Series	Men of a Certain Age	Nominated	
2011	Primetime Emmy Awards	Outstanding Supporting Actor in a Drama Series	Men of a Certain Age	Nominated	
2012	NAACP Image Awards	Outstanding Supporting Actor in a Drama Series	Men of a Certain Age	Nominated	
2014	Critics' Choice Television Awards	Best Supporting Actor in a Comedy Series	Brooklyn Nine-Nine	Won	
2014	NAACP Image Awards	Outstanding Actor in a Comedy Series	Brooklyn Nine-Nine	Nominated	
2014	Primetime Emmy Awards	Outstanding Supporting Actor in a Comedy Series	Brooklyn Nine-Nine	Nominated	
2014	Satellite Awards	Best Actor – Television Series Musical or Comedy	Brooklyn Nine-Nine	Nominated	
2014	Screen Actors Guild Awards	Outstanding Performance by an Ensemble in a Comedy Series	Brooklyn Nine-Nine	Nominated	
2015	NAACP Image Awards	Outstanding Actor in a Comedy Series	Brooklyn Nine-Nine	Nominated	
2015	Primetime Emmy Awards	Outstanding Supporting Actor in a Comedy Series	Brooklyn Nine-Nine	Nominated	
2016	Critics' Choice Television Awards	Best Supporting Actor in a Comedy Series	Brooklyn Nine-Nine	Won	
2016	Critics' Choice Television Awards	Best Supporting Actor in a Comedy Series	Brooklyn Nine-Nine	Nominated	
2016	NAACP Image Awards	Outstanding Actor in a Comedy Series	Brooklyn Nine-Nine	Nominated	
2016	Primetime Emmy Awards	Outstanding Supporting Actor in a Comedy Series	Brooklyn Nine-Nine	Nominated	
2016	Satellite Awards	Best Supporting Actor – Series, Miniseries or Television Film	Brooklyn Nine-Nine	Nominated	
2020	Critics' Choice Television Awards	Best Supporting Actor in a Comedy Series	Brooklyn Nine-Nine	Nominated	
2020	NAACP Image Awards	Outstanding Supporting Actor in a Comedy Series	Brooklyn Nine-Nine	Nominated	
2020	Primetime Emmy Awards	Outstanding Supporting Actor in a Comedy Series	Brooklyn Nine-Nine	Nominated	
2021	NAACP Image Awards	Outstanding Supporting Actor in a Comedy Series	Brooklyn Nine-Nine	Nominated	
2022	NAACP Image Awards	Outstanding Supporting Actor in a Comedy Series	Brooklyn Nine-Nine	Nominated	
2022	NAACP Image Awards	Outstanding Character Voice Performance – Motion Picture	Spirit Untamed	Nominated	
2023	Critics' Choice Television Awards	Best Supporting Actor in a Drama Series	The Good Fight	Nominated	
