= Passing Glory =

1999 American film directed by Steve James

- TNT Film Poster
- Directed by: Steve James
- Screenplay by: Harold Sylvester
- Produced by: Quincy Jones; Magic Johnson; Harold Sylvester
- Starring: Andre Braugher; Rip Torn; Sean Squire
- Music by: Stephen James Taylor
- Release date: February 21, 1999
- Running time: 100 minutes
- Country: United States
- Language: English

Passing Glory is a 1999 basketball-drama film produced for TNT, written by Harold Sylvester, and directed by Steve James. It is based on a true story.

This movie stars Andre Braugher, Rip Torn, and Sean Squire, and features a speaking role by Arthur Agee, subject of the documentary Hoop Dreams, also directed by Steve James. The music was composed by Stephen James Taylor.

== Plot ==
An angry black Josephite priest (Andre Braugher) in 1960s New Orleans goes against the wishes of his parish leader (Rip Torn) as he pushes a basketball game between his unbeaten all-black team and an undefeated all-white prep school team. This is based on the true story of the first integrated basketball game in the history of New Orleans. The plot follows the events leading up to the game between the Josephites' all-black St. Augustine High School and all-white Jesuit High. It focuses on the struggles that Father Joseph Verrett had in trying to pull the game off and trying to earn respect for his team.

Hired as a history teacher, Father Verrett will not let the athletes in his classes be given the special treatment that they've been used to. "I teach history," he informs the headmaster when asked to take over the suddenly vacant position of basketball coach. "I believe sports are overemphasized." Moreover, coming from the North, he can't understand why star black athletes don't go to the best white colleges, as they should. "Down here, 'should' and 'is' is a long ways apart," the dad of the team's star informs him. The film includes many tangible examples of the racism then present. The blacks have to go to a separate "coloreds only" line at fast food outlets, and ordering a meal in the wrong place can and does get you thrown in jail.

== Cast ==
- Andre Braugher as Father Joseph Verrett
- Rip Torn as Father Robert Grant
- Sean Squire as Travis Porter
- Ruby Dee as Mommit Porter
- Bill Nunn as Howard Porter
- Daniel Hugh Kelly as Mike Malone Sr.
- Tony Colitti as Chick Viola
- Shawn Wright as Jerry Singer

== See also ==
- List of basketball films
