= Thief (TV series) =

- Andre Braugher as Nick Atwater
- Created by: Norman Morrill
- Starring: Andre Braugher; Mae Whitman; Malik Yoba; Yancey Arias; Clifton Collins Jr.
- Country of origin: United States
- Original language: English
- No. of seasons: 1
- No. of episodes: 6

Production
- Running time: 43-46 minutes
- Production companies: Pariah Television; Sarabande Productions; Regency Television; Fox Television Studios

Original release
- Network: FX
- Release: March 28 – May 2, 2006

Thief is a 2006 American thriller crime drama miniseries starring Andre Braugher as Nick Atwater, a master thief and leader of a heist crew, balancing his personal life with the planning of a major heist. It aired on FX from March 28 to May 2.

The pilot was originally ordered by Fox back in 2002, but did not move forward until Braugher signed on. Despite critical acclaim, the show failed to garner significant ratings and FX declined to extend the series.

Each episode features a different song performed by multiple Grammy Award nominee Anthony Hamilton.

== Cast and characters ==
- Andre Braugher as Nick Atwater
- Mae Whitman as Tammi Deveraux
- Malik Yoba as Elmo "Mo" Jones
- Yancey Arias as Gabriel "Gabo" Williams
- Clifton Collins Jr. as Jack Hill

== Episodes ==
No.	Title	Directed by	Written by	Original release date
1	"Pilot"	Paul McGuigan	Norman Morrill	March 28, 2006
The team breaks into a bank vault in San Francisco's Chinatown. Changing the plan at the last moment, Nick permits them to take a large stack of cash in addition to the bearer bonds they were there to find. While they are in the vault, Nick gets a phone call from his wife, telling him that her daughter, Tammi, is at the police station. Nick says they will discuss the situation later. Outside the bank, Izzy, who is in charge of bypassing security, loses focus and allows the bank's alarm to sound. Hearing the alarm, Vincent, a Chinese mobster, spots Nick leaving the bank. After the getaway, Nick tells Izzy he is out of the crew until he can quit the drug habit that caused his mistake. Arriving at Roselyn's house with the take from the robbery, Nick is told that the money belongs to the Chinese mob and will have to be returned. Unbeknownst to them, the Chinese mob is not content with the return of the money, and Vincent is sent to find and kill the members of the team. The crew is extremely disappointed at having had to give up the money, and they urge Nick to find another heist to make up for the low earnings from the bank job. As they are discussing their plans, Nick gets a call that his wife has been in a car accident. She eventually dies at the hospital, leaving Nick to care for his stepdaughter. Meanwhile, Detective Hayes of the New Orleans Police Department is under investigation by Internal Affairs. His wife is about to leave him, but he assures her he will come up with a way to make things right. Later that night, Izzy shows up in Nick's back yard, high on drugs and brandishing a gun, demanding to be let in on the next job. Nick refuses, and when Izzy raises his pistol, Nick shoots him. Eavesdropping from inside the house, Tammi witnesses the shooting. Elmo, Gabo, and Jack take Izzy out to the bayou, where they kill him and set fire to his car.
2	"I Ain't Goin' to Jail for Anyone"	John David Coles	Norman Morrill	April 4, 2006
Nick presents his plan for the crew's next heist. The team will infiltrate an airplane to rob a U.S. Treasury shipment of $30 million. The plan is complicated and the timeframe is very short—they have only nineteen days to prepare. After his wife's funeral, Nick and Tammi get into an argument about her living arrangements and her irresponsible father. During the argument, she lets Nick know that she saw him shoot Izzy. Nick lies and says Izzy went to the hospital and was fine, and is now back in Texas. Meanwhile, Vincent goes to Roselyn's house, kills her bodyguard, and tortures her to find the names of the crew. She does not crack, and he finally executes her and takes her cell phone. Later, when Nick arrives at the house, he discovers her body and realizes what has happened.
3	"Everything That Rises Must Converge"	Dean White	David Manson	April 11, 2006
Realizing that Roselyn had information he needed written down in her notebook, Nick devises a plan to break into her house (which is now a crime scene). He finds her safe, cracks it, and retrieves her notebook. Using the information from Roselyn's notes, Nick contacts an airline employee who will help them sneak onto the plane, and a metal worker to build them a replica of the airplane's cargo bay. He also meets with Riley, an old associate, to ask him to help fund the plan. Since Ros is dead, Nick needs a new backer and someone to help launder the money after the heist. Although he is retired, Riley agrees. Plans are set in place for Gabo to acquire the cargo manifest, and for Elmo to gain access to the food service trucks. Watching the news, Tammi sees a story about a body discovered in the bayou. She recognizes the victim as Izzy, and realizes that Nick has lied to her again. Because of his slow progress, as well as concerns about his Parkinson's disease, Vincent is forced to pair up with the boss's nephew, Billy Kwan, who calls himself Shrimp Boy. Shrimp Boy is young and seemingly irresponsible, but murderously loyal to his uncle's crime syndicate. He is determined to find Nick and his crew. The title of the episode may be a reference to a collection of short stories by Flannery O'Connor, including a story called "Everything That Rises Must Converge."
4	"No Direction Home"	Dean White	Rafael Alvarez	April 18, 2006
Tammi's father, who lives in Hawaii, is unwilling to let her live with him. Nick has to sell the house in preparation for leaving town, and he feels Tammi's only other option is boarding school. Detective Hayes tries to track down Jack, the only lead the police have on the San Francisco job, to try to squeeze him for a share of the money. Following Jack, Hayes discovers the rest of the crew. Vincent and Shrimp Boy find Nick at his car dealership and let him know that they are after him. Afraid that Tammi will be hurt, Nick sends her to stay with Riley while he finishes preparations for the plane heist.
5	"Flight"	John David Coles	David Manson	April 25, 2006
The night before the plane heist, Detective Hayes confronts Nick and blackmails him for $1 million, half of the take from the Chinatown bank robbery. He is unaware of the plans for the new job, and tells Nick to have the money by the next day. The following day, the team's airline contact smuggles Nick and Jack onto the plane inside food carts. Once in the air, they emerge from the carts, disable the service lift, and break into the cargo hold where the money is. A flight attendant finds that he is unable to access the lower hold, which raises the suspicions of a treasury agent on board. Nick and Jack cut through the treasury lock, move the money, and replace everything to avoid detection. They then go back inside the food carts to await landing. Meanwhile, Gabo has been searching for Tammi, who has run away with her boyfriend. At Nick's house, he runs into Vincent and Shrimp Boy. After a shootout inside the house, Gabo is wounded but manages to escape. When the plane lands, Nick, Jack, and the money are safely transported out of the plane. Elmo helps hijack the food truck, and the team is reunited to divide the money. Back on the plane, the treasury agent demands to check on the shipment of cash, and when his key does not fit the lock, his suspicions grow. He grounds the plane and contacts his superiors. Hayes, furious that Nick did not pay him, goes to the car dealership to look for him. Vincent and Shrimp Boy have been watching the building and they go in after him, thinking he may have information. There is a standoff, which comes to a sudden end when Vincent kills both Shrimp Boy and Hayes. He sets the scene up to look like the two killed each other, and leaves the bodies in the warehouse.
6	"In the Wind"	John David Coles	Norman Morrill	May 2, 2006
FBI Special Agent Paterson has been called in to investigate the plane heist. Tammi's father calls Nick to tell him that she bought a ticket to Hawaii but that he refuses to take her in if she makes the trip. Nick is forced to go to the airport to find her. Gabo is at Riley's house, trying to have the bullet removed from his stomach, but Riley is unable to do it. When Nick arrives to pick him up, he drops Tammi off for protection once again. Meanwhile, the FBI finds a witness—the driver of the hijacked food truck—who identifies Elmo from a book of mug shots, and the man who made the cargo bay replica is also arrested. Nick and the crew plan to hide the money in some classic cars and have them shipped out of town in a container. Elmo is worried about his family and wants to call his wife, but Nick tells him to get rid of his cellphone, and the crew decide they will sneak Elmo out with the cars. The investigation leads the police to Riley, who is able to turn them away but decides he wants more money for his trouble; he is now holding Tammi hostage. The crew splits the money to make their separate escapes, and Nick trades his entire share to save Tammi. Uncle Lao has arrived in New Orleans to claim Billy's body and, secretly, to kill Vincent for his failure. However, when the time comes, Vincent is faster on the draw and kills his boss first. By the time Paterson and the other FBI agents reach the warehouse, the crew has gone. Elmo uses his cellphone to call his wife a short distance from the warehouse, but is arrested during the call. Gabo, on his way out of town, is forced to pull off the road; the bleeding from his wound is too severe, and his fate is not certain at the end of the episode. Jack, unable to convince his girlfriend to come with him, escapes alone. Nick makes arrangements to send Tammi to boarding school in California while he decides what his next step will be.

== Awards and nominations ==
On August 27, 2006, at the 58th Primetime Emmy Awards, Andre Braugher won the Primetime Emmy Award for Outstanding Lead Actor in a Miniseries or Movie for his portrayal of Nick Atwater, the second career Emmy for Braugher. Clifton Collins, Jr. was also nominated for his portrayal of Jack Hill for Outstanding Supporting Actor in a Miniseries or Movie.

Braugher also received a nomination for the Golden Globe Award for Best Actor – Miniseries or Television Film.
