= Pullman Porter Blues =

Pullman Porter Blues is a 2012 play written by Cheryl West. Set in 1937, during the Great Depression, the play shows the story of the Pullman porters on a train ride aboard the Panama Limited from Chicago to New Orleans.

== Locations performed ==
- Arena Stage Kreeger Theater in Washington, D.C.
- Goodman Theatre in Chicago

== Cast ==
- Grandfather Monroe - Larry Marshall
- Cephas - Warner Miller or Tosin Morohunfola
- Sylvester - Cleavant Derricks
- Train conductor Tex
- Lutie the stowaway

== Music ==
- Hezekiah’s Song
- This Train
- Sweet Home Chicago
- Wild Women Don't Have the Blues
- Panama Limited Chant
- Panama Limited Blues
- 900 Miles
- Joe Louis Blues
- Hop Scop Blues
- That Lonesome Train Took My Baby Away
- Trouble in Mind
- Grievin’ Hearted Blues
- Hezekiah’s Song (Reprise)

== Reception ==
Variety reviewer Paul Harris wrote: "Despite its flaws, "Pullman Porter Blues" offers delightful moments and earns kudos for attitude." The Chicago Reader's Justin Hayford was critical of the play's "repetitive scenes," while the Chicago Tribune's Chris Jones found the production to be "a good 15 minutes too long" but was nonetheless entertained.

== See also ==
- 10,000 Black Men Named George, 2002 film.
