= Executive Order 8802 =

1941 United States executive order by President Franklin Roosevelt

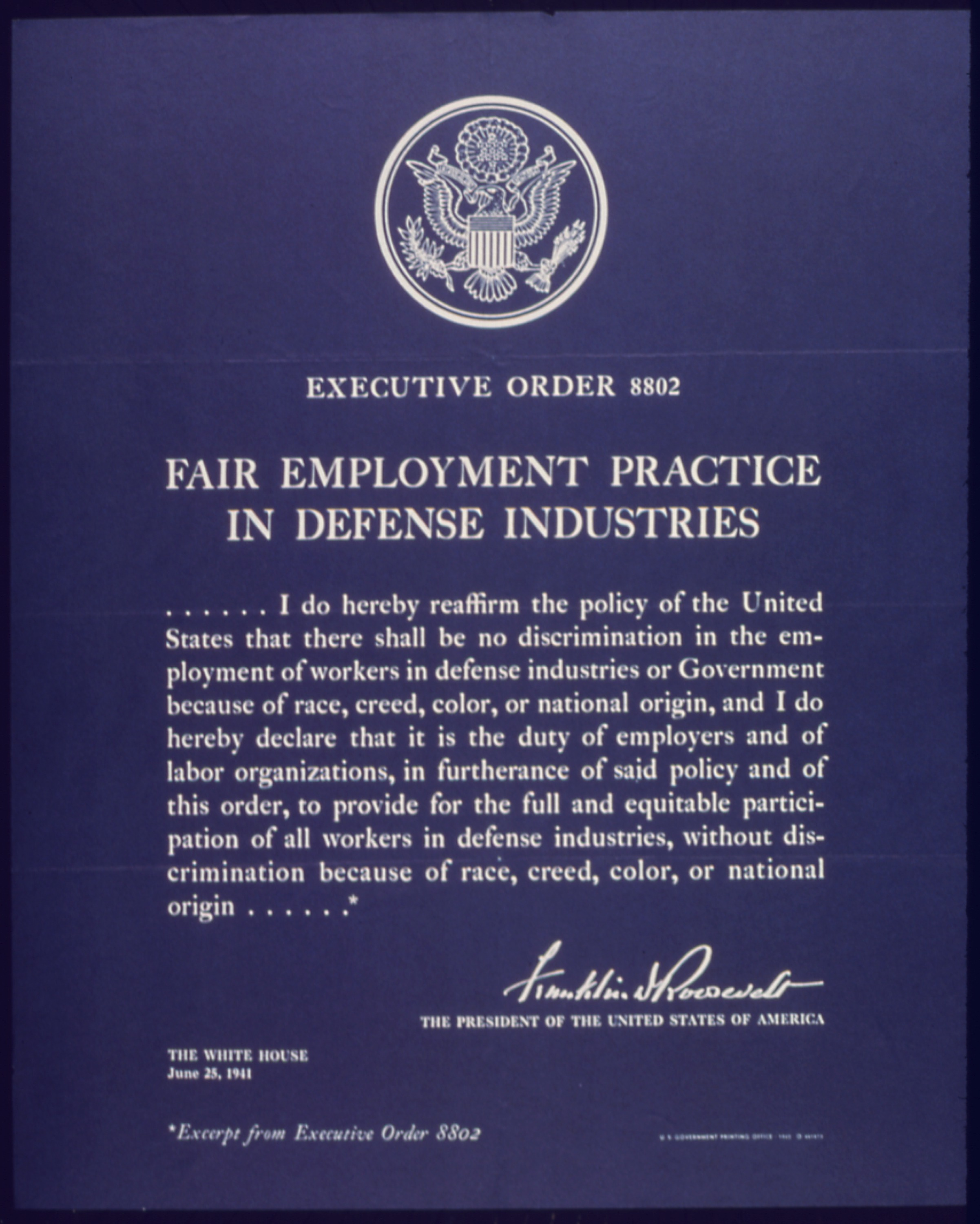
Executive Order No. 8802, Fair Employment Practice in Defense Industries

Executive Order 8802 was an executive order signed by President Franklin D. Roosevelt on June 25, 1941. It prohibited ethnic or racial discrimination in the nation's defense industry, including in companies, unions, and federal agencies. It also set up the Fair Employment Practice Committee. Executive Order 8802 was the first federal action, though not a law, to promote equal opportunity and prohibit employment discrimination in the United States. It represented the first executive civil rights directive since Reconstruction.

The President's statement that accompanied the order cited the war effort, saying that "the democratic way of life within the nation can be defended successfully only with the help and support of all groups," and cited reports of discrimination:

There is evidence available that needed workers have been barred from industries engaged in defense production solely because of considerations of race, creed, color or national origin, to the detriment of workers' morale and of national unity.

The order was issued in response to pressure from civil rights and labor activists A. Philip Randolph, Walter White and others involved in the March on Washington Movement, who had planned a march on Washington, D.C., on July 1, 1941, to protest racial discrimination in industry and the military.

== Content of the order ==
The preamble to the order read:

Whereas it is the policy of the United States to encourage full participation in the national defense program by all citizens of the United States, regardless of race, creed, color, or national origin, in the firm belief that the democratic way of life within the Nation can be defended successfully only with the help and support of all groups within its borders; and

Whereas there is evidence that available and needed workers have been barred from employment in industries engaged in defense production solely because of consideration of race, creed, color, or national origin, to the detriment of workers' morale and of national unity:

Now, Therefore, by virtue of the authority vested in me by the Constitution and the statutes, and as a prerequisite to the successful conduct of our national defense production effort, I do hereby reaffirm the policy of the United States that there shall be no discrimination in the employment of workers in defense industries or government because of race, creed, color, or national origin, and I do hereby declare that it is the duty of employers and of labor organizations, in furtherance of said policy and of this Order, to provide for the full and equitable participation of all workers in defense industries, without discrimination because of race, creed, color, or national origin;

== Discrimination in defense industries leading to the order ==
At the time that the order was issued, the US had yet to officially enter World War II, and it would not until after the Attack on Pearl Harbor in December 1941. However, the US had already involved itself in the war effort through other means, such as by supplying the Allied Powers through the Lend-Lease Act. The US's role as a supplier, as well as the US's mounting preparations to officially enter the War, helped drive the US's economy out of the Great Depression.

The economic benefits of the war, however, were disproportionately experienced by White Americans. Indeed, while the unemployment rate among White Americans plummeted from 18% to 13% in between April and October 1940, the unemployment rate for Black Americans remained stagnant at 22%. In an era where segregation was still legal (the landmark Supreme Court case Brown v. Board of Education deeming segregation unconstitutional would not be issued until 1954), Black workers were prohibited from working despite acute labor shortages. According to a 1941 survey by the US employment service (USES), 51% of defense jobs were not open to Black workers.

Employment disparities could not be fully explained by differences in job competencies between Black and White individuals. The president of North American Aviation stated that “it is against company policy to employ them as aircraft workers or mechanics... regardless of their training.” Lester Granger of the National Urban League described how Black electricians, carpenters, and cement workers were prohibited from filling vacant positions.

== Civil rights activists' advocacy and negotiations with the Roosevelt administration ==
A. Philip Randolph, leader of a large Black railroad worker union, was concerned by the discrimination against Black workers in defense industry hiring. In a 1940 issue of The Pittsburgh Courier – a newspaper that would later be intimately involved in the Double V campaign – Randolph demanded the right for Black Americans “to work and fight for [their] country”.

In January 1941, Randolph formed the March on Washington Movement (MOWM). The first objective of the movement was to bring 10,000 Black Americans to gather at the Lincoln Memorial to protest racial discrimination in the military and defense industries. Later, the target size of the march was increased ten-fold to a march of 100,000 Black Americans. Other Black leaders of the MOWM included secretary of the NAACP Walter White, leader of the National Urban League T. Arnold Hill, the leader of the National Council of Negro Women Mary McLeod Bethune, and more.

With the stated date for the MOWM impending, the Roosevelt administration rushed to negotiate with the MOWM's leaders. First-lady Eleanor Roosevelt sent Randolph a letter stating that the planned march was a “grave mistake”, but to no reply from Randolph. Other members of the Roosevelt administration urged defense industry factories to stop discrimination against Black workers, but Randolph stated that he would only call off the march if an executive order was issued.

Anxious to stop the march, Roosevelt enlisted the help of New Dealer Aubrey Williams and labor expert Anna M. Rosenberg. They helped organize a meeting of the leaders of the MOWM with Roosevelt at the White House. The meeting held on June 18 (just two weeks prior to the planned march) quickly came to an impasse. In response to Randolph's demand for an executive order, Roosevelt replied:

“Well Phil, you know I can’t do that. If I issue an executive order for you, then there'll be no end to other groups coming in here and asking me to issue executive orders for them too.”

On the other hand, the MOWM leaders refused to settle for any action short of an executive order. Eventually, the Roosevelt administration acquiesced. A series of meetings in both New York and Washington resulted in the draft order. These meetings involved Randolph and White discussing with Williams, Rosenberg, and New York Mayor Fiorello La Guardia. The order was drafted by Joseph Rauh.

The March on Washington was suspended after Executive Order 8802 was issued on June 25, 1941.

== Enforcement and history ==
War Manpower Commission poster quoting FDR's Executive Order 8802

=== Fair Employment Practice Committee (FEPC) ===
The order established the President's Fair Employment Practice Committee (FEPC) within the Office of Production Management, which was to centralize government contracting in the defense buildup before the United States entered World War II. The FEPC was to educate industry as to anti-discrimination requirements, investigate alleged violations, and "take appropriate steps to redress grievances which it finds to be valid." The committee was also supposed to make recommendations to federal agencies and to the President on how Executive Order 8802 could be made most effective.

However, the FEPC was limited by its small size and limited funding, as its initial staff consisted of 11 with a budget of $80,000. More details on challenges faced by the FEPC are explored in its dedicated Wikipedia article (refer to section "See Also"). The FEPC has weak authority that helped limit how effective the enforcement could be. However, the FEPC established a precedent and exposed the possibility for new committees that could evoke big change. It became a blueprint for future ways to approach change.

=== Succeeding federal actions addressing discrimination in defense and defense industries ===
Executive Order 8802 was amended several times during the war years. After the US entered the war, the FEPC was placed under the War Production Board, established under Executive Order 9040.

In May 1943, Executive Order 9346 was issued, expanding the coverage of the FEPC to federal agencies carrying out regular government programs and returning it to independent status. Following the end of World War II, the committee was terminated by statute on July 17, 1945.

While Executive Order 8802 addressed discrimination in defense industry hiring, the government did not end segregation in the armed forces until 1948, when President Harry S. Truman issued Executive Order 9981. Years later congressional passage of Title VII of the 1964 Civil Rights Act and Executive Order 11246 in 1965 prohibited discrimination in employment and public facilities.

== Impact on other races ==
=== Italian and German Americans ===
Many citizens of Italian or German ethnicity were negatively affected by World War II, which the Roosevelt administration feared could impede the war effort by lowering morale. Indeed, some government officials considered this ethnic discrimination as more pressing than that against Black Americans.

=== Mexican Americans ===
Mexican Americans faced discrimination in the workplace and public transportation, often being seen as no better than dogs. Executive Order 8802 outlawed discrimination in the defense industry based on “race, creed, color, or national origin”. Executive Order 8802, established the Fair Employment Practices Committee (FEPC). While it ensured African Americans could receive fair employment, it often failed to provide the same protections to Mexican Americans because of America's foreign policy in regard to Latin American nations. For example, the FEPC was supposed to hold public hearings to discuss accusations of discrimination, however it often canceled the hearings at the last minute when a case involving accusations by Mexican Americans was on the docket, fearing public knowledge of mass discrimination would compromise the Good Neighbor Policy. Moreover, though workplace discrimination took place in the Bracero Program as well, concerns were ignored for similar reasons. Second generation Mexican Americans had a reputation for being more vocal in addressing workplace grievances and were more receptive to unionization as a solution for widespread discrimination.

== See also ==
- Committee on Fair Employment Practice
- March on Washington Movement
- Executive Order 9981
- Executive order (United States)
