= March on Washington Movement =

African American protest action (1941–1946)

The March on Washington Movement (MOWM), organized by activists A. Philip Randolph and Bayard Rustin and lasting from 1941 to 1946, was a tool designed to pressure the U.S. government into providing fair working opportunities for African Americans and desegregating the armed forces by threat of mass marches on Washington, D.C. during World War II. When President Roosevelt issued Executive Order 8802 in 1941, prohibiting discrimination in the defense industry under contract to federal agencies, and creating the first federal agency concerned with discrimination, the Fair Employment Practices Committee, Randolph and collaborators called off the initial march.

Randolph continued to promote nonviolent actions to advance goals for African Americans. Future civil rights leader Martin Luther King Jr. and other younger men were strongly influenced by Randolph and his ideals and methods.

== Background ==
=== State of the nation ===
In the lead-up to the United States' entry into World War II, African Americans resented calls to "defend democracy" against Nazi racism while having to deal with discrimination in all sectors of life and business in the United States, especially the South, where they had been disenfranchised since the turn of the century and oppressed by Jim Crow laws.

By the fall of 1940, the American economy was emerging from the Depression. The defense boom benefited whites, but black workers were denied opportunities because of widespread racial discrimination in employment. Some government training programs excluded blacks based on their being refused entry to defense industries, and many skilled black workers with proper training were unable to gain employment. In 1940 the president of the North American Aviation Co. was quoted as saying, "While we are in complete sympathy with the Negro, it is against company policy to employ them as aircraft workers or mechanics ... regardless of their training.... There will be some jobs as janitors for Negroes." It was in this climate that activists began to develop the March on Washington Movement.

=== Purpose of the march ===
The March on Washington Movement was an attempt to pressure the United States government and President Franklin D. Roosevelt into establishing policy and protections against employment discrimination as the nation prepared for war. A. Philip Randolph was the driving force behind the movement, with allies from the NAACP and other civil rights organizations. He had formed and led the Brotherhood of Sleeping Car Porters beginning in 1925. His leadership in the March on Washington Movement, in which organizing middle and lower class members would be so important, was based on his strong experience in grassroots and union organizing. Randolph's independence from white sources of power was shown when he said of the movement, "If it costs money to finance a march on Washington, let Negroes pay for it. If any sacrifices are made for Negro rights in national defense, let Negroes make them...."

== Leadership ==
Randolph's leadership and strategy defined the nature of the March on Washington Movement. His reliance on grassroots activism and African-American media and organizations was influenced by his childhood. His father was an African Methodist Episcopal (AME) preacher, and Randolph heard numerous parishioners complain about the state of race relations and discrimination. He and his brother were privately tutored, and raised to believe that they were "as intellectually competent as any white". On September 26, 1942, after the MOWM had succeeded in gaining an Executive Order against discrimination in industry, Randolph reiterated that the fight would continue despite these gains. He said, "Unless this war sound the death knell to the old Anglo-American empire systems, the hapless story of which is one of exploitation for the profit and power of a monopoly-capitalist economy, it will have been fought in vain."

=== Women in the movement ===
The Women's Auxiliary was a group of mostly wives and relatives of the Brotherhood of Sleeping Car Porters. They were active within the MOWM primarily in fundraising and community efforts, as well as working broadly to promote ideas of "concepts of black manhood, female respectability, and class consciousness."

== Chronology ==
Early lobbying efforts to desegregate the military previous to 1941 did not persuade President Roosevelt to take action. On September 27, 1940, the first delegation composed of A. Philip Randolph, Walter White (NAACP), and T. Arnold Hill (National Urban League), met with President Roosevelt and his top officials. The delegation presented a memorandum demanding immediate integration of all blacks in the armed services. The White House issued a statement saying, "The policy of the War Department is not to intermingle colored and white enlisted personnel in the same regimental organizations." The armed forces were not integrated until 1948, under President Harry S. Truman.

Concerned that traditional meetings were not effective, on January 25, 1941, A. Philip Randolph officially proposed a March on Washington to "highlight the issue." In the following months, chapters of the MOWM began to organize for a mass march scheduled for July first of that year. During the spring, organizers estimated they could attract 100,000 marchers for the event.

A week before the march was to take place, Mayor Fiorello La Guardia of New York City met with MOWM leadership to inform them of the president's intentions to issue an executive order establishing the first Fair Employment Practices Committee (FEPC) that would prohibit discrimination in federal vocational and training programs. Before the order was signed, the MOWM demanded also that it included a provision for desegregation of war industries. Roosevelt agreed and issued Executive Order 8802, which prohibited discrimination in federal vocational and training programs, and in employment in defense industries contracting with the government. Given this major victory, Randolph agreed to cancel the march. He continued the March on Washington Movement as a way to maintain an organization that could track and lobby for progress, and hold the FEPC to its mission.

The MOWM continued rallies throughout the summer on these issues, but the high water mark had passed. The movement's continued call for nonviolent civil disobedience alienated some black organizations, such as the NAACP, whose leaders withdrew some support. Although organized to bring about the 1941 march on Washington, the MOWM operated until 1947; its representatives collaborated with other groups to continue pressure on the federal government. In 1943 Roosevelt issued Executive Order 9346, which expanded coverage of the FEPC to federal agencies beyond those in defense.

Randolph continued to promote non-violent actions to advance goals for African Americans. Future civil rights leader Martin Luther King Jr. and other younger men were strongly influenced by his methods.

== Media effect ==
While mainstream media had a role in reporting on the movement, African-American media outlets covered it most thoroughly. Early in the spring of 1941, black newspapers expressed skepticism of the movement's ambitious goals to attract tens of thousands of marchers. The Chicago Defender worried whether even "2,000 Negroes would march".

Their tone changed, however, as the date of the march approached. By May, black newspapers reported on growing support for the march; The Amsterdam News of New York City ran the front-page headline: "100,000 in March to Capitol." The Chicago Defender reported "50,000 preparing for a March for jobs and justice".

== Communist appeal ==
The MOWM had an uneasy relationship with communist organizations in the United States. Communists supported the idea of a proletariat uprising but "constantly drew a line between the 'job-march' and its 'war-mongering leadership.'" Randolph used various tactics to avoid having communists be part of the March on Washington Movement, as he knew it caused difficulties in gaining support for the larger goals of African Americans. He restricted membership to African Americans; although black Communists might participate, only a small percentage of the disciplined Communist party members were black.

== See also ==
- Social movements
- BlackPast.org
