= Fair Employment Practice Committee =

U.S. federal program to ban discriminatory employment during World War II

The Fair Employment Practice Committee (FEPC) was created in 1941 in the United States to implement Executive Order 8802 by President Franklin D. Roosevelt "banning discriminatory employment practices by Federal agencies and all unions and companies engaged in war-related work." This was shortly before the United States entered World War II. The committee was created in response to labor and civil rights pressure (such as a march on Washington suggested by A. Philip Randolph) in the country. The executive order also required federal vocational and training programs to be administered without discrimination. Established in the Office of Production Management, the FEPC was intended to help African Americans and other minorities obtain jobs in home front industries during World War II. In practice, especially in its later years, the committee also tried to open up more skilled jobs in industry to minorities, who had often been restricted to lowest-level work. The FEPC appeared to have contributed to substantial economic improvements among black men during the 1940s by helping them gain entry to more skilled and higher-paying positions in defense-related industries.

In January 1942 after the US entry into World War II, Roosevelt issued Executive Order 9040 to establish the War Production Board, which replaced the Office of Production Management and put the FEPC under it answering to the War Manpower Commission. The new board, concentrating on converting the domestic economy to a wartime footing, slashed the committee's limited budget.

In response to strong support for the FEPC and a threatened march on the capital, Roosevelt issued Executive Order 9346 in May 1943, which gave the FEPC independent status within the Office of the President, established 16 regional offices, and widened its jurisdiction to all federal agencies, in addition to those directly involved in defense. It was put within the president's Office of Emergency Management. Analysis of the incomes of blacks who gained entry into the defense industries compared to men outside them showed that they benefited from the higher wages and generally retained their jobs in the early postwar years until 1950.

== History ==
On June 25, 1941, President Roosevelt created the Committee on Fair Employment Practice, generally known as the Fair Employment Practice Committee (FEPC) by signing Executive Order 8802, which stated that "there shall be no discrimination in the employment of workers in defense industries or government because of race, creed, color, or national origin." A. Philip Randolph, the founding president of the Brotherhood of Sleeping Car Porters, had lobbied with other activists for such provisions because of the wide discrimination against African Americans in employment across the country. With the buildup of defense industries for World War II, many African Americans moved to the industrial and urban centers in the North and West during the second phase of the Great Migration in search of jobs and to avoid rampant racial segregation, bigotry, and violence in the rural South. Upon arriving there, they were constantly excluded from applying in the defense industries because of racism and the fear of competition by Northern and Western whites.

With all groups of Americans being asked to support the war effort, Randolph demanded changes in the employment practice of the defense industries. Together with other activists, Rudolph planned to muster tens of thousands of persons for a 1941 March on Washington to protest the continued segregation in the military and discrimination in defense industries. A week before the planned march, New York Mayor Fiorello La Guardia met with him and other officials to discuss the president's intent to issue an executive order announcing a policy of non-discrimination in federal vocational and training programs. Randolph and his allies convinced him that more was needed, especially directed at the booming defense industries.

President Roosevelt issued Executive Order 8802 to prohibit discrimination among defense firms that had contracts with the government. He established the Fair Employment Practice Committee to implement the policy through education, acceptance of complaints of job discrimination, and work with industry on changing employment practices. The activists called off their march.

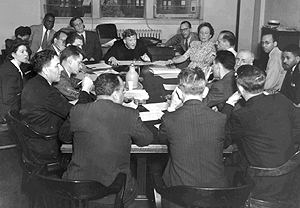
An FEPC press conference, c. 1942

== Beginning ==
After the executive order was signed, Roosevelt appointed Mark Etheridge, a liberal editor of the Louisville Courier-Journal, to head the new agency. Etheridge brought "important political connections and public relations expertise to the job" but "emphasized interracial cooperation over equality and refused to challenge the southern system of segregation." Knowing that industry was likely to be hostile, Randolph and other activists believed that the FEPC would depend on workers keeping their own records as to practices at workplaces and taking cases of discrimination to the committee.

The committee had a limited budget of $80,000 in its first year, which was paid from the emergency funds of the Office of the President, which continued to fund it, as for some other agencies created by executive order. Etheridge needed to focus on a few activities in certain areas of the country. He held the first of the FEPC hearings in Los Angeles in October 1941. Some companies admitted they were discriminating based on race when hiring for new job positions, but Etheridge did little to change their practices. That lack of enforcement caused many union leaders, civil rights leaders, government officials, and employers to doubt whether the FEPC and the executive order could produce desired change.

== Second hearing ==
During the second round of hearings on the executive order, held in Chicago and New York in January and February 1942 after US entry into World War II, supporters of the policy spoke. Support was high in these cities for several reasons: some positions with the FEPC were held by influential black attorneys who also worked closely with activists from the Brotherhood of Sleeping Car Porters, the NAACP, and other prominent groups. Also, in both cities "activists [had] formed Metropolitan Fair Employment Practice Councils to help workers document discrimination and bring complaints before the FEPC and push local officials to implement Roosevelt's order." These cities also had histories of strong union organizing, and some union leaders were willing to cooperate to change workplaces.

Etheridge stated his opposition to discrimination in the employment practices of companies that failed to implement the EO. In this second round of hearings, Etheridge took action related to companies that had complaints filed against them. For companies in Chicago and Milwaukee, he demanded that all the companies on trial update their employment policies to conform to the EO. The companies were required to document the changes made and send updated information to employment agencies (to alert them to the hiring of minorities), in addition to providing reports about their employment status to the FEPC, for updates on minority hires.

The FEPC alone did not end employment discrimination in New York or Chicago but contributed to improvements. Progress was also dependent on other parties, for instance, the government officials and local activists who worked together to enforce President Roosevelt's executive order.

== Employment ==
Within a year of the executive order being issued, the number of African Americans and other minorities being employed by the defense industries had increased, especially in shipbuilding and aircraft plants. Automobile plants, which were rapidly converted to wartime production, showed the most significant improvement in the hiring of minorities. They already had established unions that began to encourage compliance and force cooperation of members. After a wildcat strike in Detroit in 1943 at the Packard plant, when three blacks were promoted to work next to whites, activists and officials of the Congress of Industrial Organizations (CIO) became more effective in pressuring the companies and threatening white union members with the risk of being fired for refusing to work alongside African Americans.

== Challenges ==
The Fair Employment Practice Committee encountered great resistance in the South, where states had disfranchised blacks since the turn of the century and maintained legal segregation in public facilities under their Jim Crow laws. The executive order was strongly opposed by local employers and elected officials, as well as most white workers, and the civil rights organizations were not as influential because blacks were generally closed out of the political system, despite their significant portion of the population in many areas of the region. Black activists were effective in some areas in getting local officials to address discrimination in employment. As historian Thomas Maloney noted in a review of Andrew E. Kersten's book on the FEPC, "Success in promoting greater labor market equality was dependent on support from local government, federal government offices in the city, and local activist organizations."

The FEPC had little power and no authority to regulate employment practices. The FEPC was given a very low budget, small staff, and little means for reinforcement. Historians such as Ronald Takaki believe it was a "show" kind of agency, set up for failure. It was opposed for ideological reasons by Southern Democrats and other congressmen, and by some labor officials. Some Federal officials in Washington actively frustrated the FEPC's efforts; for example, Undersecretary of State Sumner Welles advised President Roosevelt that the State Department was "strongly opposed" to the public hearings that the FEPC was planning to hold in June 1942, worrying that they might damage the US reputation abroad by publicizing social inequities or give its enemies material to undermine United States morale at home and among its fighting troops.

During the first year, the FEPC had a budget of $80,000. Over time, the committee added staff, but its eventual budget of $431,609 provided average spending on positions that was below that for other agencies. Those who opposed the FEPC did so in many ways. Many efforts were taken to discredit the committee by questioning the constitutionality of its mission and accusing the FEPC of communism.

Congressional attacks, including from powerful Southern Democrats, took place when the FEPC was required to testify before the House of Representatives Committee that oversaw its program. The House Rules Committee, headed by a Southern Congressman, also exerted control. In 1943 other opponents worked through the Senate to restrict agencies created by executive order; they required that after a year, the agency could have funds only if that money was appropriated to them by Congress, as was the policy for standing executive agencies set up by law. If the proposal had passed, the FEPC would likely have had even less money to carry out its program of holding hearings and taking testimony, as well as collecting and analyzing data from companies.

Critics of the FEPC argue that the agency was created to appease Randolph and other activists to prevent a march on the capital. The committee had a limited range of power and had to work largely by influence. The FEPC was limited to overseeing the defense industries and had no power in other industries where "numerous Negroes were employed or seeking employment."

Within the private sector of the Northern region of the United States, the FEPC began to make gains in enforcing non-discrimination. In the border region, its intervention led to some hate strikes by angry white workers. In the South, hate crimes and corruption among Southern government officials contributed to the FEPC's policies being relatively ineffective. In New Iberia, Louisiana, for example, the FEPC worked with the local NAACP branch to address admissions discrimination at a new local welding school, yet local law enforcement terrorized the agents and plaintiffs and violently expelled them from the town. Overall, the FEPC was relatively ineffective in its efforts to address the issue of racial discrimination throughout World War II.

== Changes ==
In August 1942, President Roosevelt and others noticed that the progress of the FEPC was slowing. The agency had earlier that year been put under control of the War Production Board via Executive Order 9040, which was established to replace the Office of Production Management after US entry into the war, when it needed to convert industry to a wartime footing. Opponents of this action believed that Roosevelt was yielding to pressure from powerful southern Democrats in Congress. FEPC chairman MacLean objected to the transfer, saying that Roosevelt's administration was reducing the FEPC to "a small Federal bureau without power." A. Philip Randolph said the White House's policy was completely "emasculating" the usefulness of the committee.

Roosevelt said the change was intended to support the anti-discrimination agency, but some observers believed the change hampered it. As a start, the chairman of the War Manpower Commission "slashed its budget, denied requests for office space, and refused to aid in conflicts with discriminatory contractors." Key personnel resigned in protest.

Randolph and other activists protested as well, threatening a march on Washington to put pressure on the administration. In May 1943, Roosevelt strengthened the FEPC by Executive Order 9346, giving it independence by placing it within the Office for Emergency Management in the Executive Office of the President. The new executive order required that all government contracts have a mandatory non-discrimination clause, authorized twelve regional offices and appropriate staff and broadened the jurisdiction of the agency to federal government agencies. During World War II the federal government was operating airfields, shipyards, supply centers, ammunition plants, and other facilities that employed millions. The FEPC operated until the end of the war overseeing defense industries and federal agencies.

The FEPC expanded its jurisdiction to federal government departments and agencies as employers; they were "now were explicitly covered along with war industries, unions, and war-training programs." Agency records show that New York, Chicago, Philadelphia, and San Francisco, all major sites of defense industries, were the cities with the largest number of cases filed with the FEPC, about 200 in each place.

With the help of the FEPC, black men outside the South made substantial economic progress in the 1940s. As suggested by William J. Collins, the FEPC helped make opportunities by the following:

- providing advice on how to integrate the workplace;
- giving managers a ready excuse for hiring blacks if whites objected;
- threatening to bring more powerful federal agencies into the fray on the side of the FEPC; and/or
- publicly embarrassing firms or unions that refused to hire blacks.

To promote the establishment of a permanent FEPC in the government, A. Philip Randolph recruited young feminists Anna Arnold Hedgeman in 1944 to work with a National Council to lobby for this goal. Because of limited funds, Hedgeman hired a staff of women and college students to help with the publicity and fundraising for the FEPC.

She wanted the FEPC Councils to promote fair employment policies in both state and local governments. Her staff introduced laws to this effect in almost every state, but not many state legislatures then supported such bills. A bill for a nationwide FEPC and anti-discrimination in employment made its way to Harry S. Truman after the death of President Roosevelt in 1945, who wanted to lobby the bill. By the time the Second World War ended in August, Congress "provided some additional funding but ordered the FEPC to cease all operations by June 30, 1946."

Continuing tensions in cities that were booming with increased populations for the defense industries erupted in race riots in 1943 in Detroit, Los Angeles, Mobile, Alabama; and Beaumont, Texas. In each city, new populations were competing for jobs and housing, and expectations were rising among African Americans to share in the wartime boom. In many places, white workers were resisting this change. In the Detroit Packard plant, 25,000 white workers walked off the job in 1943 when three blacks were promoted to work next to whites in the assembly line. The FEPC worked to avoid such "hate" strikes and help employers manage integration, and to negotiate settlements in cases when strikes did take place.

== Legacy ==
The Fair Employment Practice Committee did not end racial discrimination in employment practices during World War II, but it did have a lasting effect in that era. It opened some doors, as far more of its cases were based on "refusal to hire" than "refusal to upgrade" or "discriminatory working conditions". It apparently helped blacks enter "industries, firms, and occupations that otherwise might have remained closed to them."

The operation of the FEPC supported the idea that "economic rights can be obtained principally by activity in the economic sphere: through education, protest, self-help, and, at times, intimidation." It gained the support of states and government to eliminate racial discrimination in employment practices. During its relatively short period of operations from 1941 to 1946, the FEPC encouraged the formation of other groups with similar goals, such as the Leadership Conference on Civil Rights supporting the National Council for a Permanent FEPC.

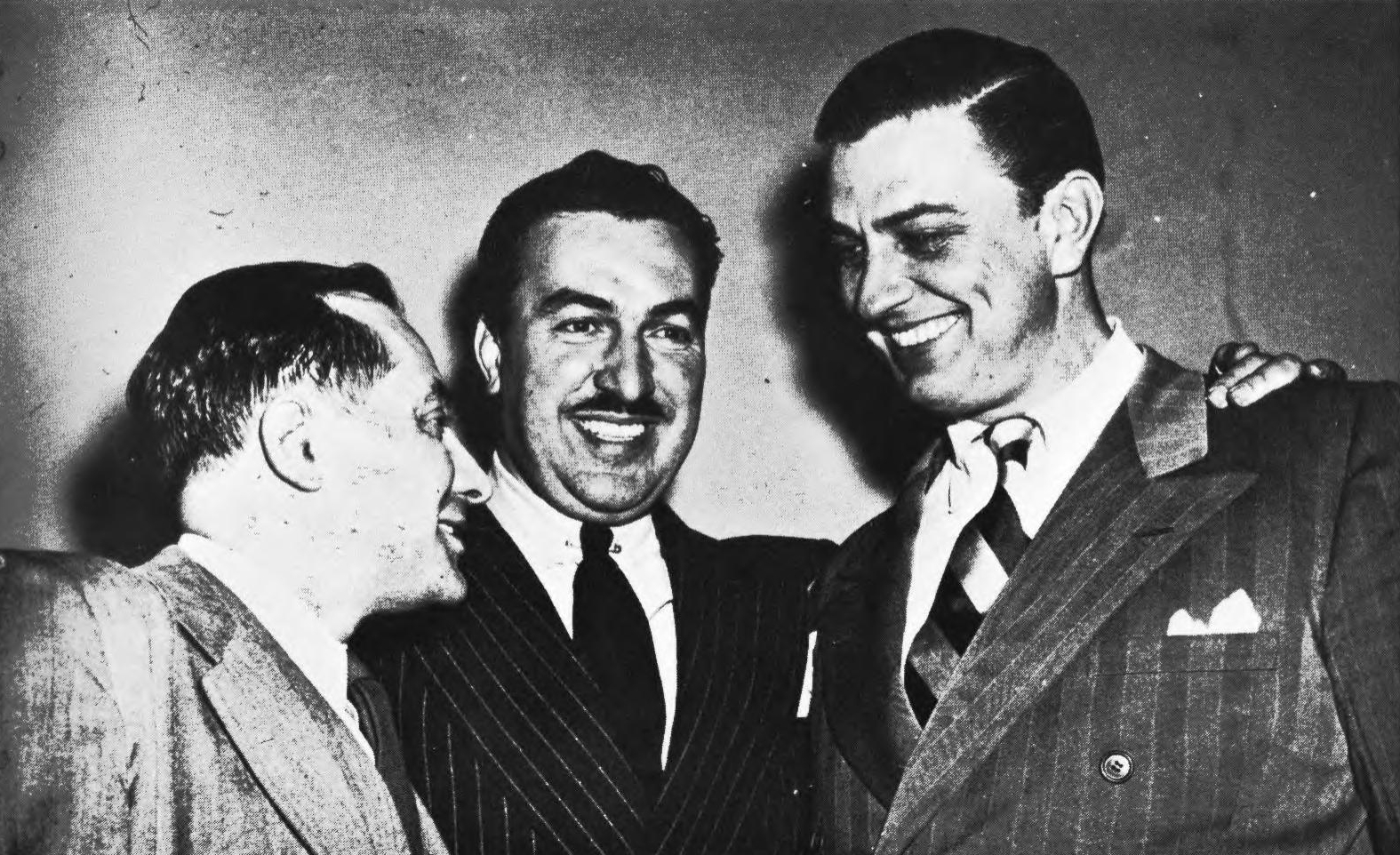
From left to right: Vito Marcantonio, Adam Clayton Powell Jr., and Franklin D. Roosevelt Jr., three congressmen unsuccessful in their attempt to save the FEPC

By opening some good-paying jobs in the defense industry, the FEPC created an opportunity for African Americans. By 1950, compared to other men in comparable positions, those blacks who gained jobs in defense were making 14% more than their counterparts outside. The proportion of blacks in the defense industry did not decline after the war, suggesting that many men had gained an entry into important new work. In 1948, President Truman asked Congress to approve a permanent FEPC, anti-lynching legislation and the abolition of the poll tax in federal elections. A Democratic coalition prevented the legislation's passage. Still operating effectively with one-party systems in their states due to disenfranchisement of blacks at the turn of the century, Southern Democrats had powerful positions in Congress, controlling chairmanships of important committees, and opposed these measures. In 1950, the House approved a permanent FEPC bill, but Southern senators filibustered and the bill failed. Congress has never enacted the FEPC into law. But Connecticut, Massachusetts, New Jersey, New York, Ohio, and Washington successfully enacted and enforced their own FEPC laws at the state level.

== See also ==
- Civil Rights Movement
- Civil and political rights
- President's Committee on Civil Rights
- Equal Employment Opportunity Commission
