= Sleeping Car Porters =

Sleeping Car Porters may refer to:

- Pullman porters
- Brotherhood of Sleeping Car Porters
- The Sleeping Car Porter
- Society for the Prevention of Calling Sleeping Car Porters "George"
