= D.C. Women's Hall of Fame =

Coordinates: 38.906°N 77.038°W

The D.C. Women's Hall of Fame (also District of Columbia Women's Hall of Fame) was a project supported by the D.C. Commission for Women and meant to honor the achievements of women from the District of Columbia. Eight women were inducted into the hall of fame in its first year, 1988. Women were chosen for making "significant contributions in the fields of community and public service, education, health or labor." The hall of fame can be seen in the Dr. Mildred E. Gibbs lecture hall at the Charles Sumner School.

== List of inductees ==
D.C. Women's Hall of Fame Inductees
Name	Image	Birth–Death	Year
Lillian Evanti		(1890–1967)	1990
Bernice Fonteneau		(1915–2006)	1993
Mary Ann Gaskins		(1940–2015)	1993
A. Janelle Goetcheus			1989
Lillian Greene			1988
Patricia Roberts Harris		(1924–1985)	1988
Ethel G. Harvey		(c. 1910–2004)	1989
Leonade Jones			
Ruth Hankins-Nesbitt		(1919–2007)	1990
Marjorie H. Parker		(1916–2006)	1994
Ethel Payne		(1911–1991)	1988
Flaxie Madison Pinkett		(1917–1995)	
Sharon Pratt		(1944–)	1988
Carol Schwartz		(1944–)	1998
Polly Shackleton		(1910–1997)	1988
Betty Shapiro		(1907–1989)	1988
Joy Simonson		(1919–2007)	1992
Brenda V. Smith			1998
Mary Church Terrell		(1863–1954)	1988
Mary Ann Gooden Terrell			1998
Rosina Tucker		(1881–1987)	1993
Ethel Weisser			1993
Princess Whitfield		(1937–2018)	1993
