= Lee Williams =

Lee Williams may refer to:

== Sports ==
- Lee Williams (American football) (born 1962), American football player
- Lee Williams (basketball) (1918–1997), American basketball coach and executive
- Lee Williams (footballer, born 1973), English footballer
- Lee Williams (golfer) (born 1981), American golfer
- Lee Williams (rugby league) (born 1988), Welsh rugby league player
- Lee Williams (rugby union) (born 1986), Welsh rugby union player
- Lee Williams (footballer, born 2007), English-Vietnamese footballer

== Others ==
- Lee Williams (actor) (born 1974), British actor and model
- Lee Williams (conductor), Canadian rail worker
- Lee "Shot" Williams (1938–2011), American soul, soul blues, and R&B singer
- Lee Williams and the Spiritual QC's, an American gospel quartet

== See also ==
- Lee Williams High School, a high school in Kingman, Arizona
