= Emma V. Brown =

American educator and activist (1843–1902)

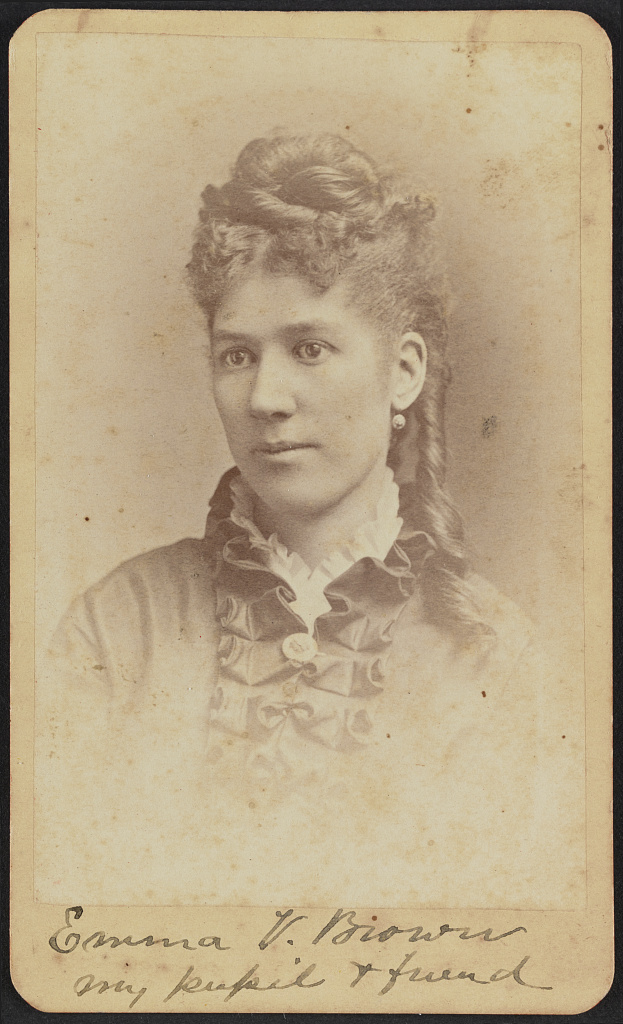
- Born: c. 1843
- Died: 1902
- Alma mater: Oberlin College
- Occupation: Teacher

Emma V. Brown (c. 1843 – 1902) was an American educator and activist for racial equality. In 1864, she became the head teacher at Lincoln School, the first public school established in Washington, D.C. for the education of black students.

== Life and career ==
Brown was the daughter of Emmeline V. Brown, a widow who supported her children as a dressmaker in Georgetown. The young Brown was a star student of Myrtilla Miner, an abolitionist who ran a school for black girls in the virulently proslavery Washington region. Brown was often frustrated with Miner's open condescension toward her black charges. But she supported Miner's overall mission: In the late 1850s, Brown briefly taught at the school alongside Emily Howland. She and Howland became longtime friends and correspondents.

The 16-year-old Brown, at Miner's urging, entered Oberlin College in February 1860. While there, she was active in the campus' antislavery community. She clashed with the president of the college, Charles Grandison Finney, over his opinion that the abolition of slavery was best accomplished incrementally.

Brown left Oberlin in June 1861. The city's slaves had been emancipated while she was away. Upon her return, she operated the School for Colored Girls for roughly a dozens students in her mother's home in Georgetown. The house, at 3044 P Street NW, still stands today.

In 1864, Washington became the first city in the South to use tax money to open a free school for black students. It opened in the Little Ebenezer United Methodist Church on Capitol Hill on March 1 with Brown as its teacher. The student body was racially segregated, but Brown, who was black or mixed-race, was assisted by a white woman, Frances W. Perkins. Perkins' salary was paid by the New England Freedman's Aid Society. Brown was paid a salary of $400 a year by the city. Brown later served as the principal of the John F. Cook School and the Sumner School.

Brown was motivated to teach by her belief that education was key to elevating the status of former slaves. She often endeavored to recruit free black women in Washington's working class to attend her school. "With education we can no longer be oppressed," she wrote in an 1858 letter to the abolitionist William Lloyd Garrison. Her residence is now part of the African American Heritage Trail in Washington, D.C.
