= Lee Williams (conductor) =

Canadian railway conductor

- Born: c. 1907; Waco, Texas, US
- Died: 2002 (aged 94–95)

Lee Williams was a Canadian railway porter, as well as civil and labour rights activist.

Williams is best known for fighting for fair treatment of Black employees at the Canadian National Railway (now Via Rail).

== Biography ==
Born around 1907 in Waco, Texas, Williams immigrated to Canada as a child in 1910, settling in Hillside, Saskatchewan with his family.

In 1930, Williams moved to Winnipeg, Manitoba, to work for the Canadian National Railway (CNR)—one of the major employers of Black men in Canada between the late 1800s and mid-20th century—as a sleeping car porter. The vast majority of Black men in Winnipeg at the time were porters, establishing the beginnings of Winnipeg's Black community in the shadow of the CPR railway station in what is now North Point Douglas.

At the time opportunities for advancement was limited among Black workers, who were not eligible to be union members or get promoted in addition to receiving very low wages.

Seeking to advocate for racial equality, Williams became chair of the local chapter of the Order of Sleeping Car Porters' Union. In 1955, he challenged the Canadian Brotherhood of Railway Employees, the predominant porter union at the time, with a request to remove job discrimination from the union’s collective agreement, but was ultimately shut down.

Williams was able to leverage his relationship with Member of Parliament John Diefenbaker, a regular train passenger who would become Canada’s 13th prime minister. Once Diefenbaker became prime minister, Williams to him asking for help securing better rights for the porters. Diefenbaker sent him a copy of Canada's Fair Employment Practices Act. Williams submitted a complaint to the federal government under the Fair Employment Practices Act, charging the rail companies with discrimination, but to no avail.

A decade later, Williams tried again, demanding the act be enforced on the federal railways. In April 1964, the government under Prime Minister Lester Pearson ruled in favour of the African-Canadian workers, ordering that CNR end its discriminatory practices. As result, many of the provisions that prevented porters from advancing in the CNR ranks had been eliminated.

As a result of the legal action, Williams became one of the first African-Canadian sleeping-car conductors and was later promoted to a supervisory position. He also served as president of the National Black Coalition of Canada.

He retired in 1972, having worked on the rails for 42 years.

Williams's actions would lead to the dismantling of segregated employment on the railways in 1978 when the federal government merged CNR and the Canadian Pacific Railway into Via Rail, allowing people of colour, as well as women, to be eligible for all jobs on the rails.

== Later life ==
Williams was married to Alice, and had three children, Sharon, Len, and Valerie.

Williams was awarded an honorary Doctor of Laws from York University in 2002. He was featured in the 1996 documentary The Road Taken.

== See also ==
- The Road Taken
