= Rosina Tucker =

American labor organizer and activist (1881–1987)

- Born: Rosina Budd Harvey; 4 November 1881; Northwest, Washington, D.C.
- Died: 3 March 1987 (aged 105)
- Other names: Rosina Corrothers
- Occupations: labor organizer, civil rights activist, educator
- Spouse(s): James D. Corrothers; Berthea J. Tucker

Rosina Corrothers-Tucker (4 November 1881 - 3 March 1987) was an American labor organizer, civil rights activist, and educator. She is best known for helping to organize the Brotherhood of Sleeping Car Porters, the first African-American trade union. At the age of one hundred, Tucker narrated a documentary about the union, Miles of Smiles, Years of Struggle.

== Early life ==
Rosina Budd Harvey was born in Northwest Washington, D.C., on November 4, 1881. She was one of nine children of Lee Roy and Henrietta Harvey, both former slaves from Virginia. Her father, who worked as a shoemaker, taught himself to read and write and fostered a love of books in his children. In 1897, Rosina Harvey was visiting an aunt in Yonkers, New York, when she met the poet James D. Corrothers, who was a guest minister there. She married "Poet" Corrothers on December 2, 1899. The couple had a son, Henry Harvey Corrothers, and raised Corrothers' other son from a previous marriage. Following the death of her husband in 1917, she moved back to Washington, D.C., where she worked for the federal government as a file clerk. She married her second husband Berthea "B.J." Tucker, a Pullman porter, on November 27, 1918.

== Brotherhood of Sleeping Car Porters ==
The porters' union, the Brotherhood of Sleeping Car Porters, launched in 1925 with A. Philip Randolph as president. B.J. Tucker joined immediately, and he and Rosina began organizing in Washington. The porters worked long hours, and had little time for union activities. Many also feared that they would lose their jobs if their employers learned of their union involvement. For this reason, the porters' wives did much of the organizing, often holding meetings in secret. Rosina Tucker attended several secret meetings with A. Philip Randolph and other union leaders. On behalf of the union she visited some 300 porters at their homes in the Washington area, distributing literature, recruiting members, and collecting dues. She also organized the local Ladies' Auxiliary, which raised funds for the union by hosting dances, dinners, and the like. When the Pullman Company learned of Rosina Tucker's union activities, they fired her husband in retaliation. After Tucker confronted her husband's supervisor at his office, her husband was rehired. Tucker described the scene later:

I looked him right in the eye and banged on his desk and told him I was not employed by the Pullman company and that my husband had nothing to do with any activity I was engaged in ... I said, 'I want you to take care of this situation or I will be back.' He must have been afraid ... because a black woman didn't speak to a white man in this manner. My husband was put back on his run.

In 1938 she attended the national union conference in Chicago, where she chaired the Constitution and Rules committee. That year she was elected secretary-treasurer of the union's auxiliary, a position she held for over 30 years. In 1941 she helped organize the union's first March on Washington, which was called off when President Franklin D. Roosevelt issued Executive Order 8802. She later helped organize the March on Washington of 1963.

== Women’s Economic Councils ==
In 1925 Rosina Tucker became the president of The Ladies’ Auxiliary which is also known as the Women’s Economic Councils. It was an official way for her to continue unionist activity but also to develop her personal stance on what racial and gender equality should mean in America in the 1930s. Within her usual duties of organizing trade union women, Tucker also promoted that their role was not only to enjoy a housewife status, relying on husband’s wages but to actively participate by enrolling other women unionists and expanding ideals of women’s vital role in the fight for civil rights. Tucker’s leadership and devotion allowed the Women’s Economic Councils to tie close connections with other unions – both feminine or masculine, black or white. For instance, when the Washington Women’s Trade Union League along with the National Negro Alliance called for a mobilization against racial discrimination in the grocers’ trade, Tucker stepped in by helping the boycott. Her further participation resulted in supporting the WTUL that was fighting for civil rights and equality in such industries as laundry, domestic, hotel and restaurant sectors mainly occupied by African American women. By 1936 Rosina Tucker received a beautiful briefcase as a “token of appreciation for her service.” Working for the Women’s Economic Councils, Tucker always believed that job was never a hobby but “a tool of collective political struggle.” Thus, that briefcase seemed to be a remarkable and symbolic reward for her dedication and professionalism to the cause.

== Tucker’s perception of women’s role in the Women’s Economic Councils ==
When Tucker was nominated by Randolph to lead the first WEC in Washington, she said: “… God has something for all of us to do and ultimately places us where He wants us to be to carry out his [sic] purposes.” Her strong feeling of belonging to the cause allowed Tucker to forge her sensitive reject against the white southerners’ ideas that a Black woman was “devoid of morality,” thus incompetent. If there were obvious differences between the White and the Black cultural and social ideologies, however the common view of a woman’s role in the masculine society was her subordinate position to a man. Arguably, Tucker and other women saw their status differently; by their active participation in supporting men’s civil rights movement, the auxiliary often helped BSCP locals with rent and additional funding that consisted the utter source of women’s pride. Moreover, Tucker, besides her charity work prior to her active involvement in the WEC activity, claimed that any work including the Auxiliary Ladies’ should be paid: “…since this is a labor organization, which all of us have fought together to establish for better working conditions, … certainly those who are actually doing the work should receive a living wage.” Although none of the activists was considered as feminist, the voice of the Women’s Economic Councils members was becoming louder as to attract men’s attention to their role, professionalism, and organizational experience. But the ultimate WEC’s contribution in the long run was an educational process that many activist women brought to new generations of the Black community empowering the youth with ideas of mass action for equality of civil rights.

== Later years ==
Rosina Tucker continued her union and civil rights activities for many years. She helped organize laundry workers, teachers, and red caps in the Washington area. She lobbied Congress for labor and education legislation and testified before House and Senate committees on day care, education, labor, and D.C. voting rights. At the age of 102, she testified before a Senate subcommittee on aging; at 104, she was still traveling the country giving lectures. She also wrote an autobiography, My Life as I Have Lived It, which was published posthumously in 2012.

Tucker narrated a 1982 documentary film about the union, Miles of Smiles, Years of Struggle. Produced by Jack Santino and Paul Wagner, the film has won numerous awards, including four regional Emmys and a CINE Golden Eagle.

She was 105 years old when she died on March 3, 1987.

== Tucker’s last homage ==
On that day of her funeral (on the 3rd of March 1987) she was remembered as “Mother Tucker.” The ceremony took place at the 15th Street Presbyterian Church in Washington where she came in for 65 years until her death. Many friends and coworkers were present to pay the last tribute to one of the greatest African American activists for human rights. Thus, Norma McDaniel, one of Tucker’s closest friends, said: “She was a woman of firm conviction, yet, she was as gentle as she was strong.” Expressing the utter sadness and admiration, one of the mourners said: “She had a caring intellect, a full heart and a ready smile.” Quoting Tucker’s own words from her unpublished autobiography, she would have said that day: “Thus, while I live, let not my life be in vain, and when I depart, may there be remembrances of me and my life as I have lived it.” And there were a pride and a strong feeling of Tucker’s devotion that determined almost 70 years of political and social struggles of African American citizens for their rights to be finally accepted and equal.

== Publications ==
- Ruffin, C. Bernard, ed. (2012). My Life as I Have Lived It: The Autobiography of Rosina Corrothers-Tucker, 1881-1987. Heritage Books. ISBN 978-0788453649.
- Chateauvert, Melinda (1997). Marching Together: Women of the Brotherhood of Sleeping Car Porters. University of Illinois Press. ISBN 978-0252066368.
- Pfeffer, Paula (1995). "The Women Behind the Union: Halena Wilson, Rosina Tucker, and the Ladies' Auxiliary to the Brotherhood of Sleeping Car Porters". Labor History. 36 (4). Labor History: 557–578. doi:10.1080/00236569512331385578.
- Pitts, Dave (12 Mar 1987). "Celebrating a life, a cause: Rosina tucker, 105, and her civil rights battles recalled". The Washington Post. ProQuest 139217558.
- Day, Meagan (18 June 2018). "The First Black-Led Union Wouldn't Have Existed Without This Woman". Medium.

== Honors and awards ==
- Candace Award from the National Coalition of 100 Black Women, 1983.
- Honored by the Leadership Conference on Civil Rights
- Inducted into the D.C. Women's Hall of Fame, 1993
- The A. Philip Randolph Institute's annual Rosina Tucker Award is named for her.
- In 2025, the National A. Philip Randolph Pullman Porter Museum broke ground for a Brotherhood of Sleeping Car Porters Ladies Auxiliary Women’s History Museum, which will honor her work.
