= Ebenezer United Methodist Church =

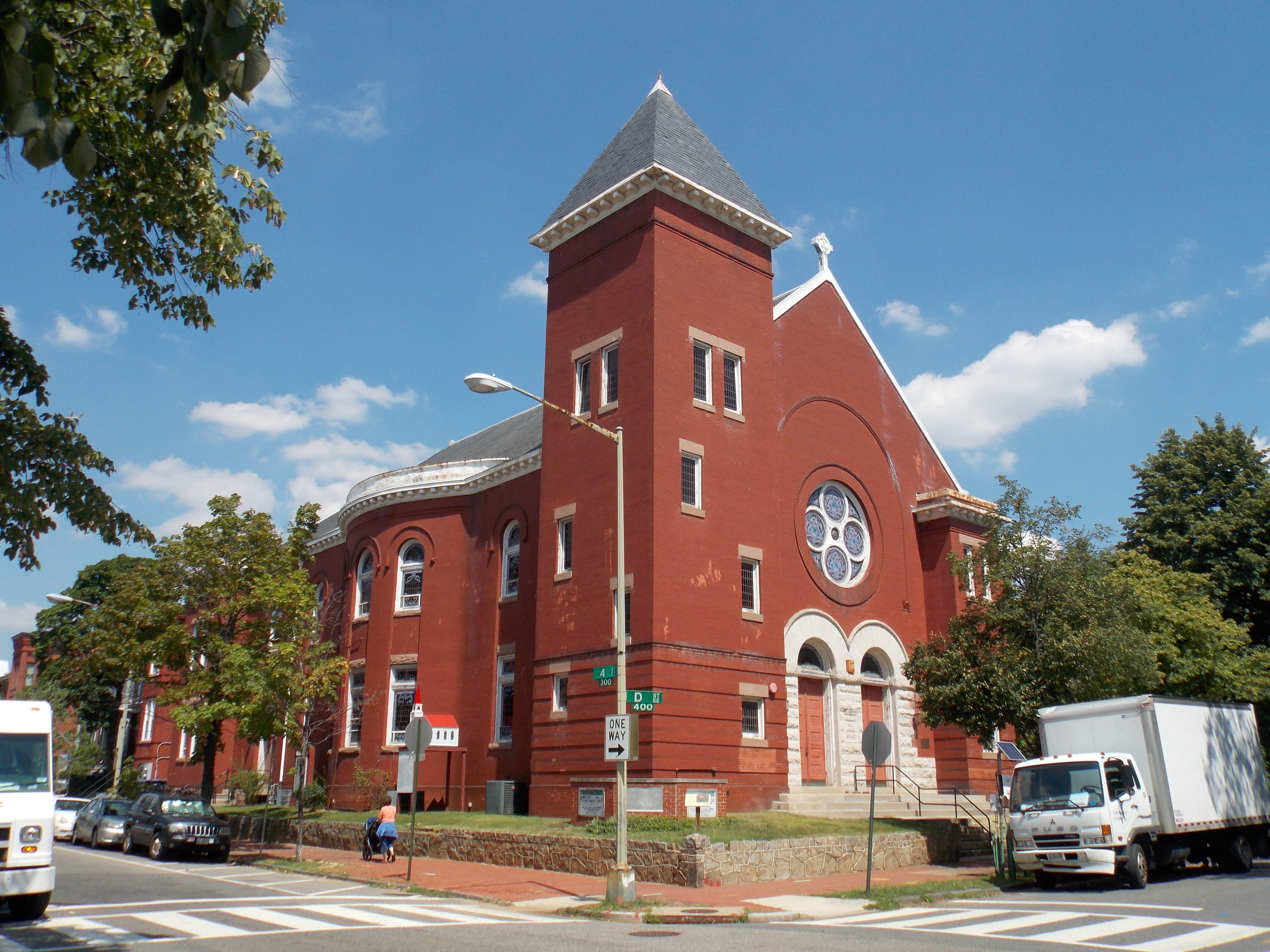
- Ebenezer United Methodist Church
- 38.8845°N 77.0003°W
- Denomination: Methodist

History
- Former name: Little Ebenezer United Methodist Church
- Founded: 1838

Clergy
- Pastor: Rev. Bresean A. Jenkins

Ebenezer United Methodist Church, founded in 1838, is a historic African American church located in the Capitol Hill neighborhood of Washington, D.C. The church was the site of the first government-sponsored school for African Americans in Washington, D.C.

== Founding ==
Ebenezer United Methodist Church, formerly Little Ebenezer United Methodist Church or Little Ebenezer, was founded in 1838 as an outgrowth of its original Mother church, the Methodist Episcopal Church.

Methodist Episcopal Church had segregated seating for Black and white congregants. The African American congregants outgrew their allotted space, and, with the support of the Mother church, founded Little Ebenezer United Methodist Church at Fourth and D Street, S.E. in Capitol Hill. The original church was a small-framed building.

Little Ebenezer became independent of its Mother church in the 1860s and installed in own board made up of African American trustees.

== Government-sponsored school ==
In March 1864, the DC government opened a school for African American students of all ages within the church. The school was the first government-sponsored school for African Americans in Washington, D.C.

Emma V. Brown and Frances W. Perkins were the school's first teachers. Perkins had been sent to Washington by the New England Freedmen's Aid Society of Boston.

The student body quickly outgrew its church space. Perkins, a white woman from New England, returned North and raised the funds needed for the construction of a new school. A lot was purchased in C Street between 2nd and 3rd Streets, SE, and the new school building was completed in the winter of 1864. The school, ultimately named Lincoln School, operated until 1947.

== Name change and new building ==
Little Ebenezer United Methodist Church became Ebenezer United Methodist Church in 1870. That same year, work began on the construction of a new brick structure to replace the church's earlier one. The new building was completed by 1873. The architect for the project was William J. Palmer.

== Present day ==
As of 2021, the church is open and active.
