= Mildred E. Gibbs =

American educator

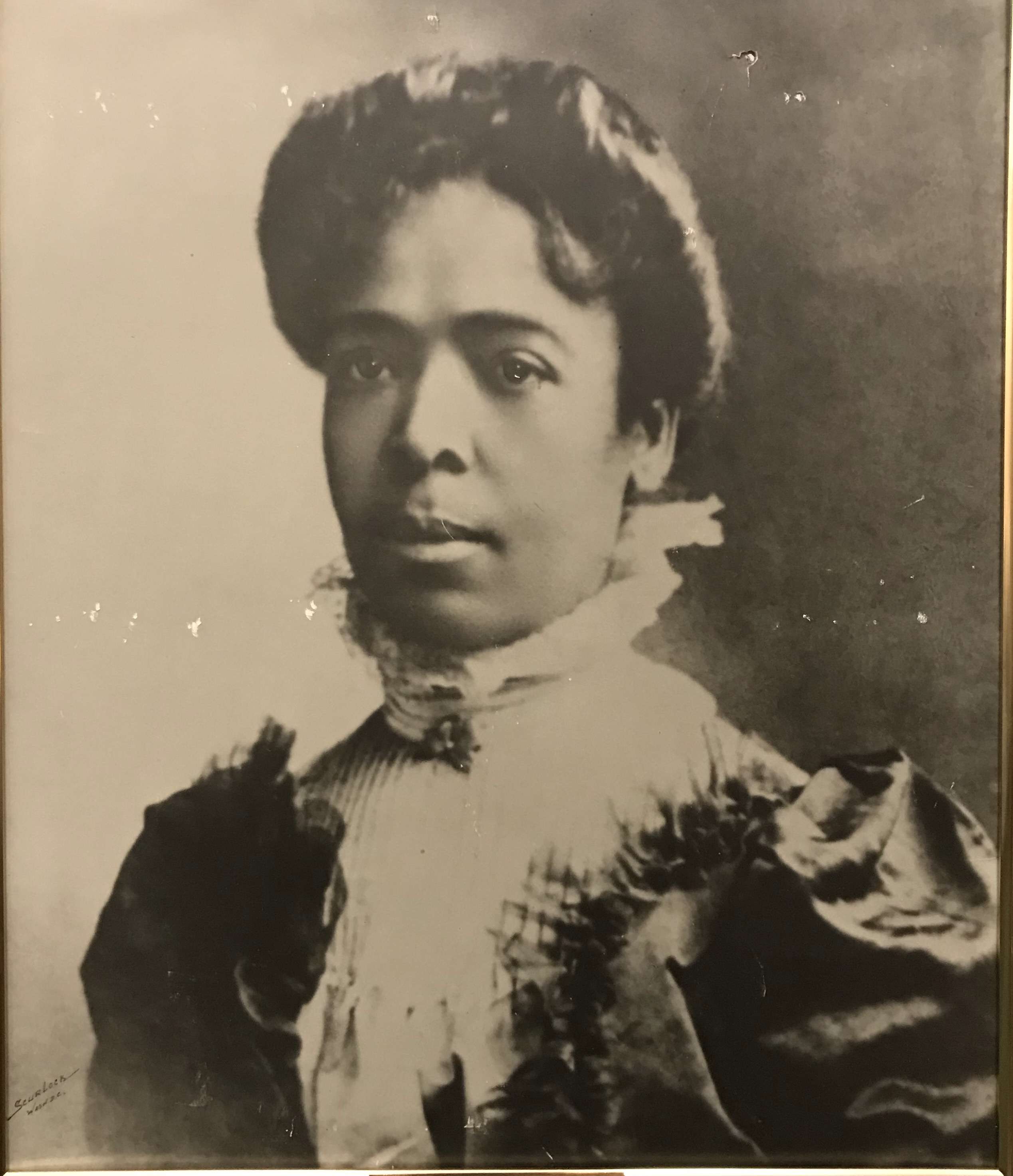
- Born: Mildred E. Gibbs; December 25, 1850; District of Columbia
- Died: October 25, 1935 (aged 84); District of Columbia
- Education: Howard University
- Occupation: Teacher

Mildred Eulalia Gibbs (December 25, 1850 – October 25, 1935) was an American educator, one of the earliest African-American women to earn a physician's degree from an American medical school, and also one of the first to obtain a doctorate from an American school.

== Education ==
Gibbs attended high school at Washington High School and was educated as a teacher at the Normal School. In 1896, the same year she was promoted to principal at the Sumner School, she enrolled in Howard University's School of Medicine Phd program, earning a degree in 1901. She was one of the first black American women to earn a medical degree in the United States.

== School Principal ==
Gibbs started her teaching career at the Anthony Bowen school and then moved to Garnet, Minor, Sumner and Briggs, before settling at the Stevens School. She was teacher/principal at Sumner, Briggs and Stevens, but she is mostly associated with the latter of those. She was principal of the Thaddeus Stevens School from 1904 to 1920 and the administrative principal from 1920 until her death in 1935. Gibbs introduced several innovative methods such as the project method, socialized recitation, visual aids, upgraded classes, school lunches and more.

== Mildred E. Gibbs School ==
The Mildred E. Gibbs Elementary School at 500 19th Street, NE in Washington, DC was named after her on May 25, 1967. It was closed in 2009.

== See also ==
- Charles Sumner School
- District of Columbia Public Schools
- Thaddeus Stevens School
