= Jack Santino =

- Born: John Francis Santino; August 1, 1947 (age 79); Boston, Massachusetts, U.S.
- Education: Boston College; University of Pennsylvania
- Occupation: Professor
- Children: 3

John Francis (Jack) Santino is an academic folklorist.

== Early life and education ==
He was born in Boston, Massachusetts, on August 1, 1947. He received a bachelor's degree in English at Boston College.

He then studied folklore at the University of Pennsylvania, where he earned his Ph.D. in 1978. His thesis was entitled The outlaw emotions: workers' narratives from three contemporary occupations.

== Work ==
He was a professor of popular culture studies at Bowling Green State University and was director of the Bowling Green Center for Culture Studies. His work has primarily focused on rituals, celebrations, and holidays as well as occupational culture and popular music. He was a featured expert on a television special produced by the History Channel about Halloween.

Along with Paul Wagoner, Santino produced the film Miles of Smiles, Years of Struggle, about African American Pullman porter unionization.

From 1996 to 2000 Santino was the editor of the Journal of American Folklore. During 2002-3 Santino was the president of the American Folklore Society.

== Books ==
- 1993: Halloween and Other Festivals of Death and Life (editor). University of Tennessee Press.
- 1994: All Around the Year: Holidays and Celebrations in American Life. University of Illinois Press.
- 1996: New Old-Fashioned Ways: Holidays and Popular Culture. University of Tennessee Press.
- 1998: Miles of Smiles, Years of Struggle: Stories of Black Pullman Porters. University of Illinois Press.
- 1998: The Hallowed Eve: Dimensions of Culture in a Calendar Festival in Northern Ireland. University Press of Kentucky.
- 2001: Signs of War and Peace: Social Conflict and the Use of Public Symbols in Northern Ireland. New York: Palgrave.

- 2003: Holidays, Ritual, Festival, Celebration, and Public Display (with Cristina Sánchez-Carretero). Biblioteca de Estudios Norteamericanos, vol. 7. University of Alcalá.
- 2005: Spontaneous Shrines and Public Memorializations of Death (editor). New York: Palgrave Macmillan.

== See also ==
- Bowling Green State University Department of Popular Culture
