= Jewish Women International =

American nonprofit organization

- Abbreviation: JWI
- Formation: 1897; 129 years ago
- Founder: American Jewish women associated with B'nai B'rith
- Founded at: United States
- Type: Social service organization
- Legal status: Active
- Purpose: Empower women and girls, ensure their safety, health, rights, and security; prevent domestic violence.
- Location: Washington, D.C., United States
- Region served: International
- Services: Social services, advocacy, education
- Fields: Women's rights, domestic violence prevention, social services
- Official language: English
- Affiliations: B'nai B'rith (historically)
- Website: jwi.org

Jewish Women International (JWI) is a Jewish-American social service organization founded in 1897 by American Jewish women associated with B'nai B'rith, an international Jewish social service organization.

The organization's mission is described as working to empower women and girls of all backgrounds, ensuring their safety, health, rights, and security. The group maintains it is inspired by a legacy of women's leadership and Jewish values. The group cites the Jewish value of Tikkun Olam ("repairing the world") as a guiding Jewish principle for the organization.

A priority for the group is the prevention of domestic violence. JWI was the first Jewish organization to establish an international conference on domestic violence in the Jewish community held in 2003. In the late 1990s, the organization estimated that family members in a sizable percentage of all Jewish households in the United States (estimated between 15% and 25%) experienced domestic violence. And that the rates were similar across the Jewish denominations.

In 2001, the group proposed a long-term strategy to respond to and prevent domestic violence in the Jewish community. Among the issues addressed by the group is the reluctance of Jewish women facing abuse to seek assistance, or delays in seeking assistance. Factors identified with this issue include shame, fear of unfavorable child custody outcomes, and the lack of financial means to seek legal recourse. The term used to describe this shame is "shonda" (a Yiddish term). The group points to the issue of the lack of awareness in the Jewish community and the lack of a vigorous condemnation from rabbinic authorities which may perpetuate the perception of domestic violence as not occurring in the Jewish community.

In 2011, CNN journalist Dana Bash resigned as a trustee of JWI under pressure over its abortion-rights advocacy. A number of conservative blogs had highlighted the group's position on abortion after Bash accepted the trustee position.

== See also ==
- National Council of Jewish Women
- Betty Kronman Shapiro
