= Pullman porter affair =

LGBT sex scandal in September 1940

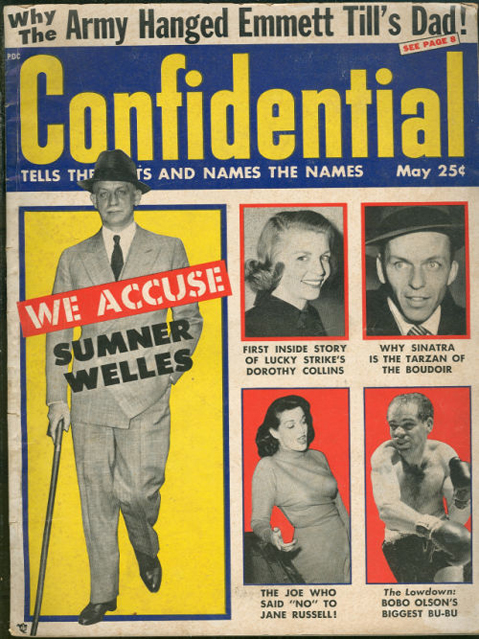
- 1956 cover of Confidential magazine expose
- Date: September 1940
- Type: Sex scandal
- Cause: Lavender scare
- Participants: Sumner Welles
- Outcome: forced resignation

The Pullman porter affair was a sex scandal involving the United States Under-Secretary of State Sumner Welles in September 1940. Welles — who was a closeted bisexual — was traveling with President Franklin Delano Roosevelt from Huntsville, Alabama to Washington, D.C., when he solicited sex from two male African-American Pullman porters. The resulting scandal resulted in Welles' resignation from the Department of State.

== Background ==
Welles was a closeted bisexual. In September 1940, Welles accompanied Roosevelt to the funeral of former Speaker of the House William B. Bankhead in Huntsville, Alabama.

== Incident ==
While returning to Washington by train, Welles - who was drunk and under the influence of barbiturates - solicited sex from two male African-American Pullman car porters. Cordell Hull dispatched his confidant, former Ambassador William Bullitt, to provide details of the incident to Republican Senator Owen Brewster of Maine. Brewster, in turn, gave the information to journalist Arthur Krock, a Roosevelt critic; and to Senators Styles Bridges and Burton K. Wheeler. When FBI Director J. Edgar Hoover would not release the file on Welles, Brewster threatened to initiate a senatorial investigation into the incident. (In 1995, Deke DeLoach told C-SPAN's Brian Lamb on Booknotes that file cabinets behind J. Edgar Hoover's secretary Helen Gandy contained two-and-a-half drawers of files, including information about "an undersecretary of state who had committed a homosexual act.")

== Resignation ==
President Roosevelt was embittered by the attack on his friend, believing they were ruining a good man, but he was obliged to accept Welles's resignation in 1943. Roosevelt particularly blamed Bullitt. His son Elliott Roosevelt wrote that President Roosevelt believed that Bullitt had bribed the porters to entrap Welles.

In August 1943, reports that Welles had resigned as Under-Secretary of State circulated for over a week. The press reported it as fact on August 24, despite an official announcement. Writing in The New York Times, Arthur Krock said that opinion in Washington saw Welles's departure as an attempt to end factionalism in the State Department: "The long-existing struggle disorganized the department, bred Hull and Welles factions among its officials, confused those having business with the department and finally produced pressure on the President to eliminate the causes." Despite the "personal fondness" of the President and his wife for Welles, he continued, the President sided with Hull because supporting a subordinate would promote revolts in other government agencies, Hull was politically connected and popular with Congress, and the Senate, he was told, would not support Welles for Secretary of State or any other office. Krock added a cryptic explanation: "Other incidents arising made the disagreements between the two men even more personal. It was those which aroused the Senate to oppose Mr. Welles that was reported to the President."

The U.S. still awaits a clarification of its foreign policy, and the forced resignation of Sumner Welles made an already murky issue even more obscure.

— TIME, September 6, 1943

While Welles vacationed in Bar Harbor, Maine, "where he held to diplomatically correct silence", speculation continued for another month without official word from the White House or the State Department. Observers continued to focus on the Hull-Welles relationship and believed that Hull forced the President to choose between them to end "departmental cleavage". Others read the situation politically and blamed FDR's "appeasement of Southern Democrats". Without confirming his resignation or speaking on the record, Welles indicated he would accept any new assignment the President proposed. Finally, on September 26, 1943, the President announced the resignation of Welles and the appointment of Edward R. Stettinius as the new Under-Secretary of State. He accepted Welles' resignation regretfully and explained that Welles was prompted to leave government service because of "his wife's poor health". Welles' letter of resignation was not made public as was customary, and one report concluded, "The facts of this situation remained obscure tonight." Time summarized the reaction of the press: "Its endorsement of Sumner Welles was surprisingly widespread, its condemnation of Franklin Roosevelt and Cordell Hull surprisingly severe." It also described the resignation's impact: "In dropping Sumner Welles [Hull] had dropped the chief architect of the US's Good Neighbor Policy in South America, an opponent of those who would do business with fascists based on expediency, a known and respected advocate of U.S. cooperation in international affairs. The U.S. still awaits a clarification of its foreign policy and the forced resignation of Sumner Welles made an already murky issue even more obscure."

== Confidential expose ==
In 1956, Confidential, a scandal magazine, published a report of the 1940 Pullman incident and linked it to his resignation from the State Department, along with additional instances of inappropriate sexual behavior or drunkenness. Welles had explained the 1940 incident to his family as nothing more than a drunken conversation with the train staff. His son Benjamin Welles wrote of the incident in his father's biography as drunken advances to several porters at about 4 a.m. that was rejected and then reported to government and railway officials.
