= Carlton Benjamin Goodlett =

American physician and publisher (1914–1997)

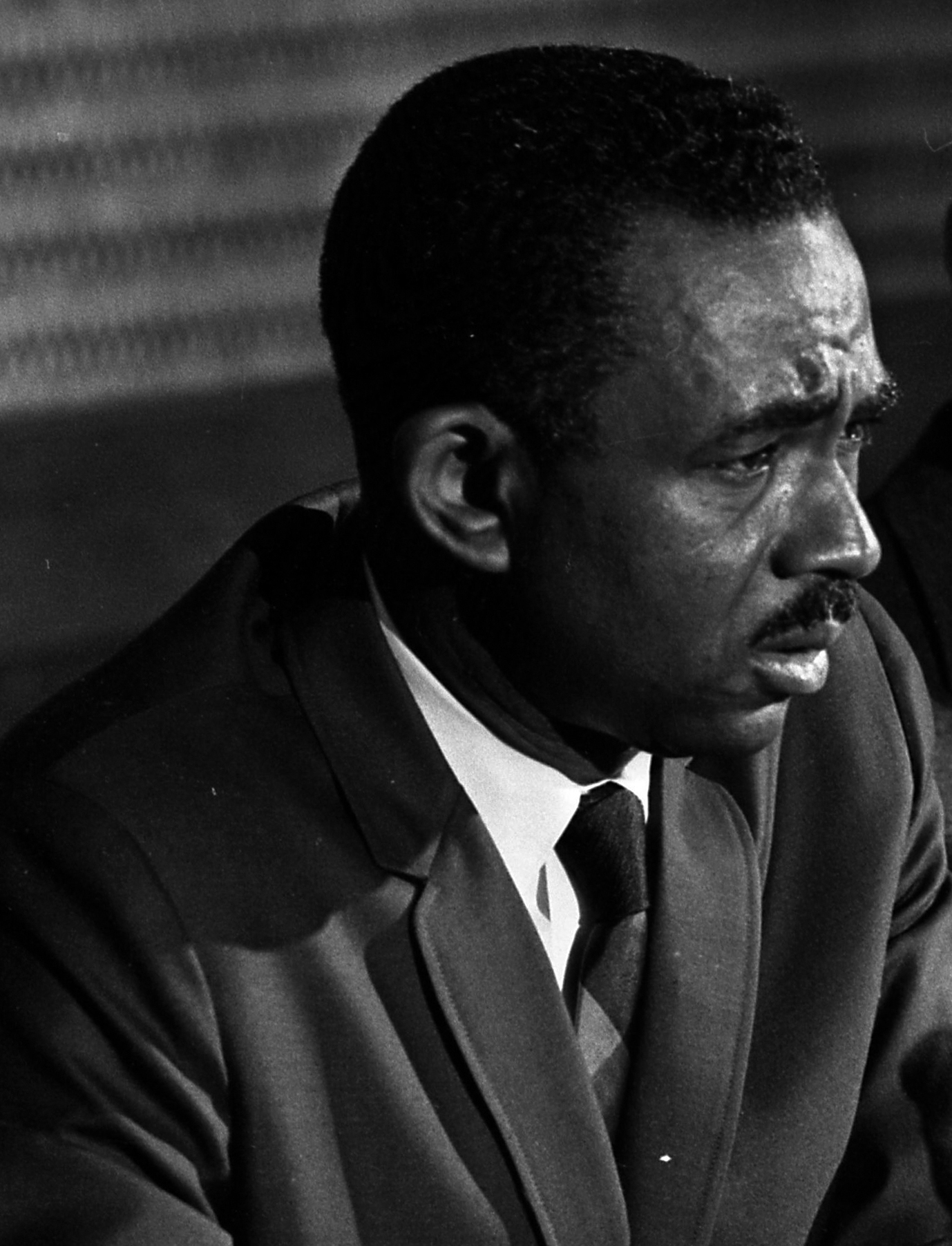
- Carlton Goodlett in 1966
- Born: July 23, 1914; Chipley, Florida
- Died: January 25, 1997 (aged 82); Cumming, Iowa
- Occupations: Physician, newspaper publisher, civil rights activist

Carlton Benjamin Goodlett (July 23, 1914 – January 25, 1997) was an American physician, newspaper publisher, political power broker, and civil rights leader in San Francisco, California. From 1951 until his death, he was the owner of Reporter Publishing Company, which published the Sun-Reporter, the California Voice, and seven other regional African-American weeklies in Northern California. Goodlett maintained a busy medical practice in his newspaper office until his retirement from medicine in 1983.

== Early life ==
He was born in Chipley, Florida, to Fannie T. Russ and Arthur Goodlett, and later migrated to Omaha, Nebraska. He was the youngest of two children. His sister's name is unknown, but when she was 5 and Carlton was 3 years old, her dress caught fire from the embers from the home's fireplace, and the house subsequently caught on fire too. She managed to get Carlton out but did not herself survive.

Goodlett was a very precocious child, often following his sister to school, being too young to attend. The teacher turned him away repeatedly, until she decided to take him seriously, and let him stay.

== Education ==
He received a bachelor's degree in 1935 from Howard University in Washington, D.C., and in 1938 he became one of the first African Americans to earn a doctorate in psychology from the University of California at Berkeley, at the age of 23. In 1944, he completed his Doctor of Medicine degree at Meharry Medical College in Nashville.

== Career ==
Returning to the San Francisco Bay Area in 1945, he opened a medical practice to serve the burgeoning new black community drawn by the war industries. At the same time, he emerged as a civil rights advocate. As president of the local branch of the National Association for the Advancement of Colored People (NAACP) from 1947–49, he protested The City's discrimination against hiring blacks for its public transportation system, demanded improvements in public housing, and exposed the exclusion of blacks and Jews from draft boards in San Francisco.

=== The Reporter ===
In 1948 he became co-owner of The Reporter, a community weekly edited by his old friend Thomas C. Fleming, which then absorbed its competitor, The Sun, to become The Sun-Reporter. In 1951 Goodlett became sole owner. He wrote most of the editorials and established it as the leading black newspaper in Northern California. In 1971 he added Oakland's California Voice and seven Metro-Reporters to his chain. He served three terms as president of the National Newspaper Publishers Association (Black Press of America).

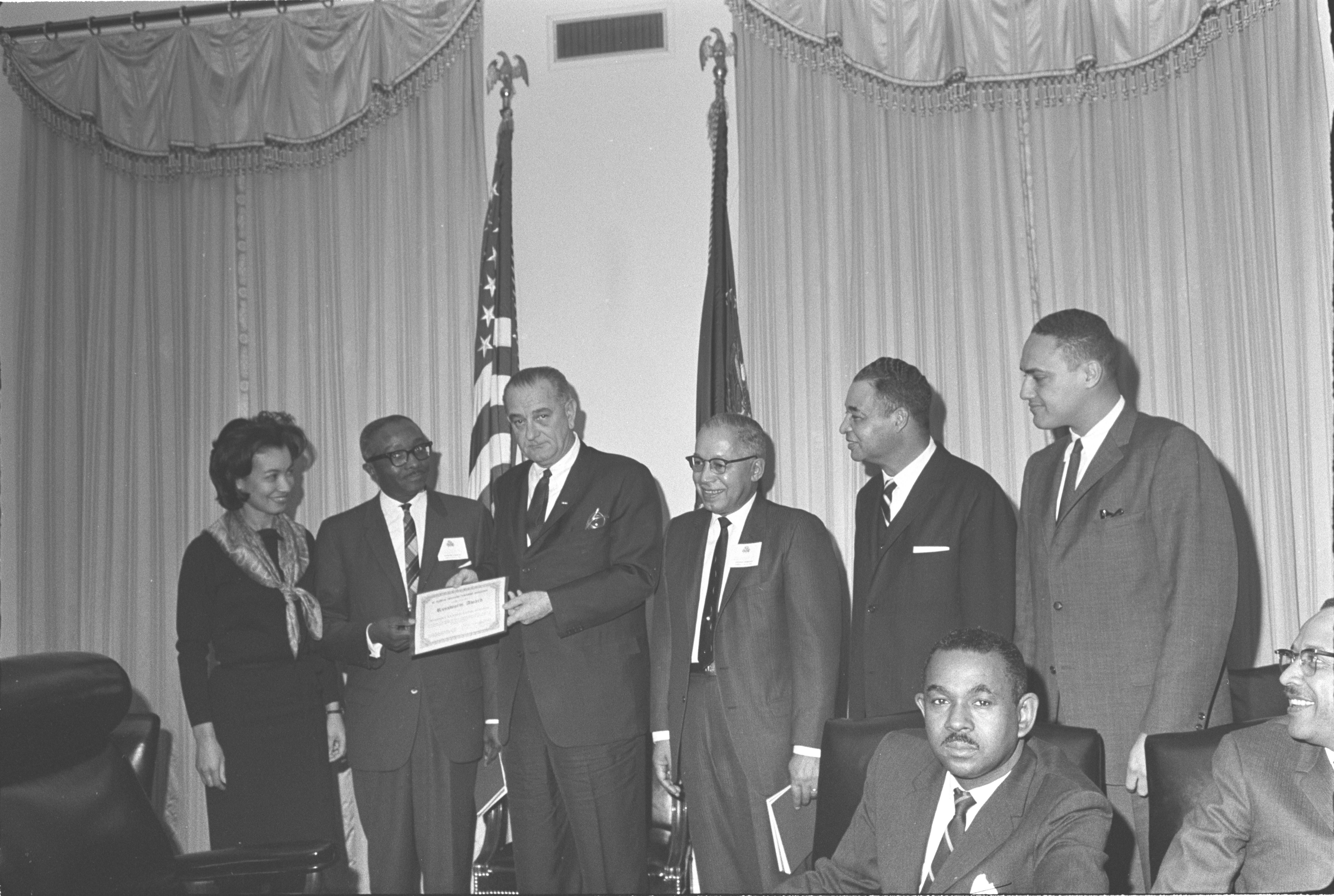
Goodlett and other National Newspaper Publishers Association members meet with Lyndon Johnson in 1965

By the late 1950s, through a constant barrage of speeches before community groups and the growing influence of his newspaper, Goodlett had become one of the city's most prominent black leaders. Using his combined newspapers to become a political force in San Francisco, Goodlett cultivated friendships with leading black entertainers, artists and politicians, including W.E.B. Du Bois, Paul Robeson, and Dick Gregory.

=== Medicine ===
One problem that black physicians encountered in San Francisco was their inability to practice in any of the local hospitals. They could send their patients to the hospital but lost them at the hospital door, where black doctors were barred from following through with their patients' treatment. Under Goodlett's leadership, all nonwhite physicians won the right to see patients at all public hospitals in the City. Goodlett was also a businessman who developed town houses, open to all San Franciscans, on Steiner Street and Geary Boulevard.

Goodlett retired from medical practice in 1983.

=== Political activism ===
In 1947, Goodlett, along with Phillip Burton and others, founded the San Francisco Young Democrats. Until Phil Burton's death in 1983, Goodlett was one of his closest allies. Phil Burton became a member of the California State Assembly and later a powerful member of Congress. Burton's brother, California Democratic Party Chairman John Burton, credited Goodlett as being "singularly responsible" for initially electing Phil Burton to office.

Both Goodlett and Phil Burton strongly supported Willie L. Brown Jr. for a California Assembly seat in 1962. Goodlett named him the Sun-Reporter Man of the Year and financed his $7,500 campaign. Brown narrowly lost that time, but won in 1964, and went on to become Speaker of the Assembly for more than 14 years, a state record. Later Brown served eight years as Mayor of San Francisco.

He was frequently and sharply critical of his Democratic friends, such as President John F. Kennedy and Governor Edmund G. "Pat" Brown, for not moving fast enough on civil rights and other causes. In 1966 Goodlett ran for governor himself as a protest against Pat Brown. He finished third out of six candidates in the Democratic primary, with 95,000 votes. Until the emergence of the Black Panther Party in the late 1960s, Goodlett was the dominant figure in San Francisco's civil rights movement in securing jobs for African Americans and appointments to important city commissions that blacks had never held.

Goodlett was arrested in 1968 while supporting a strike by San Francisco State University students who demanded a Black studies department. The students won, and the University became the first in the nation to have a Black studies program.

=== Positions and memberships ===
In the early 1960s he joined the World Peace Council, a coalition of over 120 countries, then headquartered in Helsinki, Finland. He was a member of the presidium, and traveled the globe to encourage progressive and communist causes, sometimes meeting with heads of state. He was chairman of the board of the communist William L. Patterson Foundation, and was once turned away from England because of his leftist politics.

Along with Martin Luther King Jr., Goodlett was one of the first prominent African Americans to publicly oppose the war in Vietnam. He was just as critical of his communist friends, refusing to sign a condemnation of the United States for the Vietnam War at the Communist World Peace Conference at Helsinki because it didn't go far enough. In 1970, he was awarded the Lenin Peace Medal by the Soviet Union.

Like many well-known San Franciscans, Goodlett's reputation was tarnished somewhat by his close association with the Reverend Jim Jones of the Peoples Temple. He was Jones' personal physician and published his church's newspaper. In November 1978, Jones committed suicide in Guyana with more than 900 followers. Goodlett later said, "You don't need glasses for hindsight. Everybody is running like hell away from Jim Jones now, but none of us knew at the time."

== Late life and legacy ==
When he became incapacitated from Parkinson's disease, he continued dictating or writing many of the paper's editorials, holding political meetings in the office, and guiding the direction of his newspapers. "The black tail is never going to wag the white dog," he once said, "But if we live in the belly of the beast, we can cause quite a bellyache."

In June 1994 Goodlett left San Francisco to spend his last years under the care of his son Dr. Garry M. Goodlett, in Cumming, Iowa, where he died in 1997.

On January 29, 1997, San Francisco's then-Mayor Willie L. Brown Jr. issued a statement: "It may be the single biggest loss that the black community and the progressive community has ever suffered in San Francisco. Dr. Goodlett was the pioneer on equal rights, equal opportunity, political action, entrepreneurship, and economic independence. He was truly a renaissance person."

On January 18, 1999, following a unanimous vote by the 11-member San Francisco Board of Supervisors, the official address of San Francisco City Hall was changed to 1 Carlton B. Goodlett Place. The name appears on the street sign for two blocks of Polk Street and on all stationery, business cards, and mail to and from the building.
