= Pullman porter =

Passenger railroad car worker

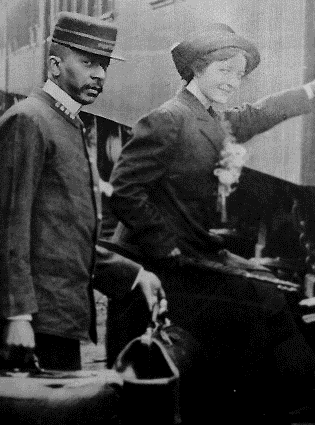
A Pullman porter assisting a passenger with her luggage

Pullman porters were men hired to work for the railroads as porters on sleeping cars. Starting shortly after the American Civil War, George Pullman sought out former slaves to work on his sleeper cars. Their job was to carry passengers' baggage, shine shoes, set up and maintain the sleeping berths, and serve passengers. Pullman porters served American railroads from the late 1860s until the Pullman Company ceased its United States operations on December 31, 1968, though some sleeping-car porters continued working on cars operated by the railroads themselves and, beginning in 1971, Amtrak. The Pullman Company also operated sleeping cars in Mexico from the 1880s until November 13, 1970. The term "porter" has been superseded in modern American usage by "sleeping car attendant", with the former term being considered "somewhat derogatory".

Until the 1960s, Pullman porters in the United States were almost exclusively black, and have been widely credited with contributing to the development of the black middle class in the United States. Under the leadership of A. Philip Randolph, Pullman porters formed the first all-black union, the Brotherhood of Sleeping Car Porters, in 1925. The union was instrumental in the advancement of the Civil Rights Movement. Porters worked under the supervision of a Pullman conductor (distinct from the railroad's own conductor in overall charge of the train), who was invariably white. The Pullman Company employed Mexican men as porters in Mexico.

In addition to sleeping cars, Pullman also provided parlor cars and dining cars used by some railroads which did not operate their own; the dining cars were typically staffed with African-American cooks and waiters, under the supervision of a white steward: "With the advent of the dining car, it was no longer possible to have the conductor and porters do double duty: a dining car required a trained staff" and "depending on the train and the sophistication of the meals, a staff could consist of a dozen men." A small number of Asian Americans worked in Pullman dining cars following the 1950s.

Pullman also employed African-American maids on deluxe trains to care for women's needs, especially women with children; in 1926, Pullman employed about 200 maids and over 10,000 porters. Maids assisted ladies with bathing, gave manicures and dressed hair, sewed and pressed clothing, shined shoes, and helped care for children by playing games with them and making sure their diapers were changed. The Central of Georgia Railway continued using this service as a selling point in their advertisements for the Nancy Hanks well into the 1950s.

== History ==
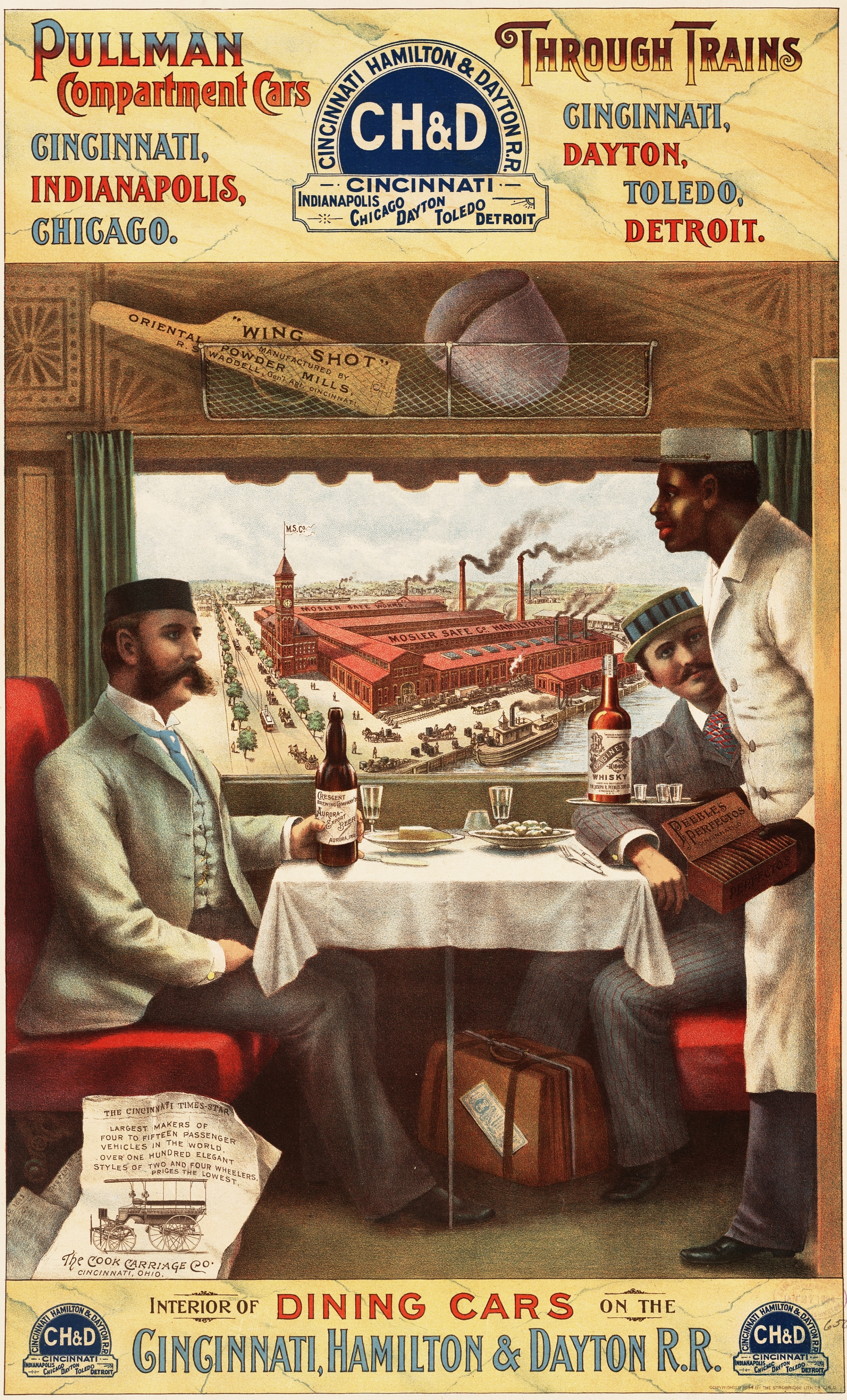
Pullman advertising poster, 1894, depicting a Pullman waiter

Prior to the 1860s, the concept of sleeping cars on railroads had not been widely developed. George Pullman pioneered sleeping accommodations on trains, and by the late 1860s, he was hiring only African-Americans to serve as porters. After the Civil War ended in 1865 Pullman knew that there was a large pool of former slaves who would be looking for work; he also had a very clear racial conception. He was aware that most Americans, unlike the wealthy, did not have personal servants in their homes. Pullman also knew the wealthy were accustomed to being served by a liveried waiter or butler, but to staff the Pullman cars with "properly humble" workers in uniform was something the American middle class had never experienced. Hence, part of the appeal of traveling on sleeping cars was, in a sense, to have an upper class experience.

From the start, Pullman's ads promoting his new sleeper service featured these porters. Initially, they were one of the features that most clearly distinguished his carriages from those of competitors, but eventually nearly all would follow his lead, hiring African-Americans as porters, cooks, waiters and Red Caps (railway station porters). According to the Museum of the American Railroad:

The Pullman Company was a separate business from the railroad lines. It owned and operated sleeping cars that were attached to most long-distance passenger trains. Pullman was essentially a chain of hotels on wheels ... Pullman provided a Porter (attendant) that prepared the beds in the evening and made them in the morning. Porters attended to additional needs such as room service from the dining car, sending and receiving telegrams, shining shoes, and valet service.

While the pay was very low by the standards of the day, in an era of significant racial prejudice, being a Pullman porter was one of the best jobs available for African-American men. Thus, for black men, this could be seen as both an opportunity and a degrading experience, as porters were stereotyped as the servant class and took abuse from customers.

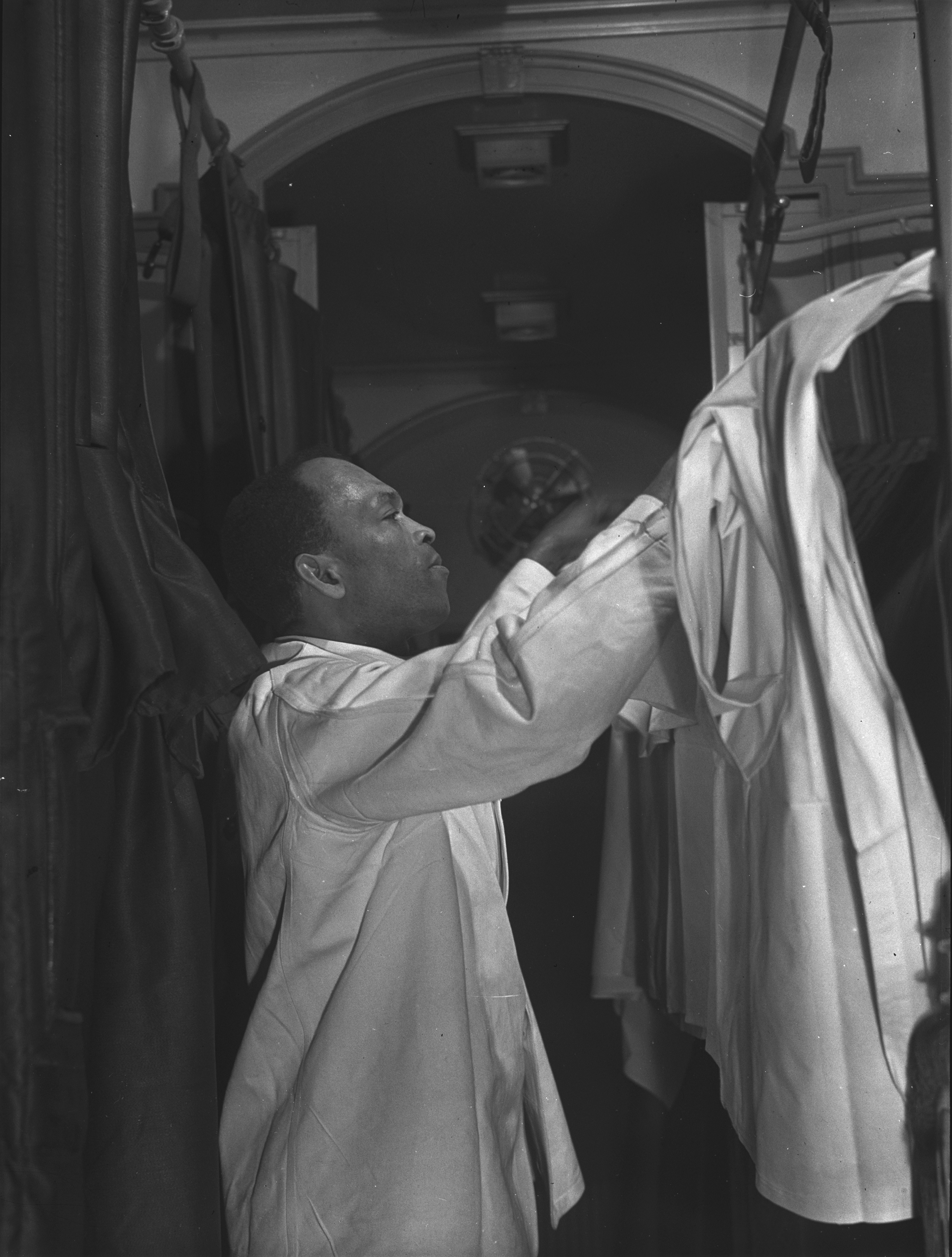
Pullman porter making an upper berth aboard the B&O Capitol Limited bound for Chicago

Many passengers called every porter "George", as if he were George Pullman's "boy" (servant), a practice that was born in the South where slaves were named after their slavemasters/owners. The only ones who protested were other men named George, who founded the Society for the Prevention of Calling Sleeping Car Porters "George", or SPCSCPG, which eventually claimed 31,000 members.

Although the SPCSCPG was more interested in defending the dignity of its white members than in achieving any measure of racial justice, it nevertheless had some effects for all porters. In 1926, the SPCSCPG persuaded the Pullman Company to install small racks in each car, displaying a card with the given name of the porter on duty. Of the 12,000 porters and waiters then working for Pullman, only 362 turned out to be named George. Stanley G. Grizzle, a former Canadian porter, titled his autobiography, My Name's Not George: The Story of the Brotherhood of Sleeping Car Porters.

Porters were not paid a livable wage and needed to rely on tips to earn enough to make a living. Walter Biggs, son of a Pullman porter, spoke of memories of being a Pullman porter as told to him by his father:

One of the most remarkable stories I liked hearing about was how when Jackie Gleason would ride ... all the porters wanted to be on that run. The reason why? Not only because he gave every porter $100.00, but it was just the fun, the excitement, the respect that he gave the porters. Instead of their names being George, he called everybody by their first name. He always had like a piano in the car and they sang and danced and had a great time. He was just a fun person to be around.

The number of porters employed by railroads declined as sleeping car service dwindled in the 1960s as passenger numbers dwindled due to competition from auto and air travel, and sleeping car services were discontinued on many trains. By 1969, the ranks of the Pullman sleeping car porters had declined to 325 men with an average age of 63.

== Duties and wages ==
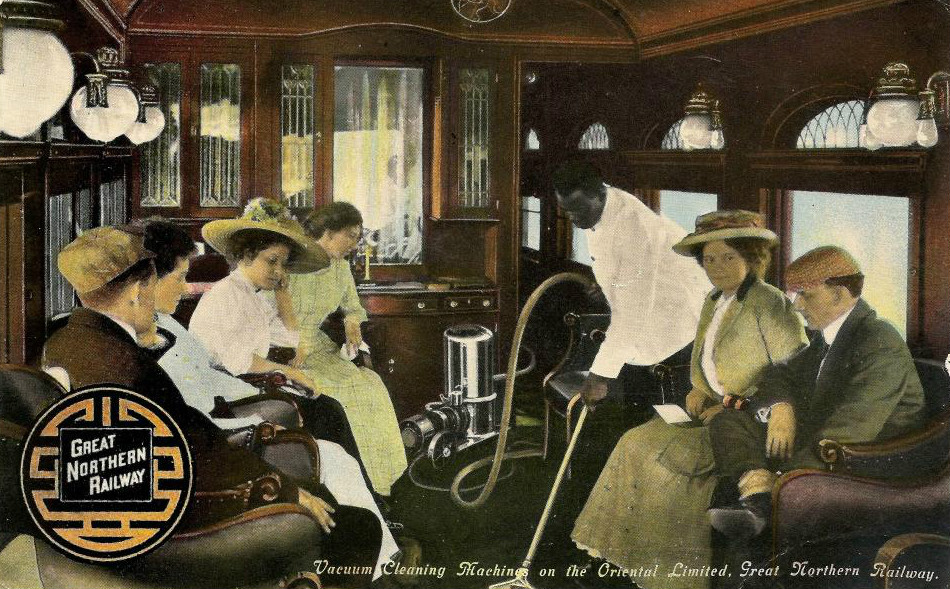
A porter is shown vacuuming the carpet in a Great Northern Railway parlor car, circa 1910.

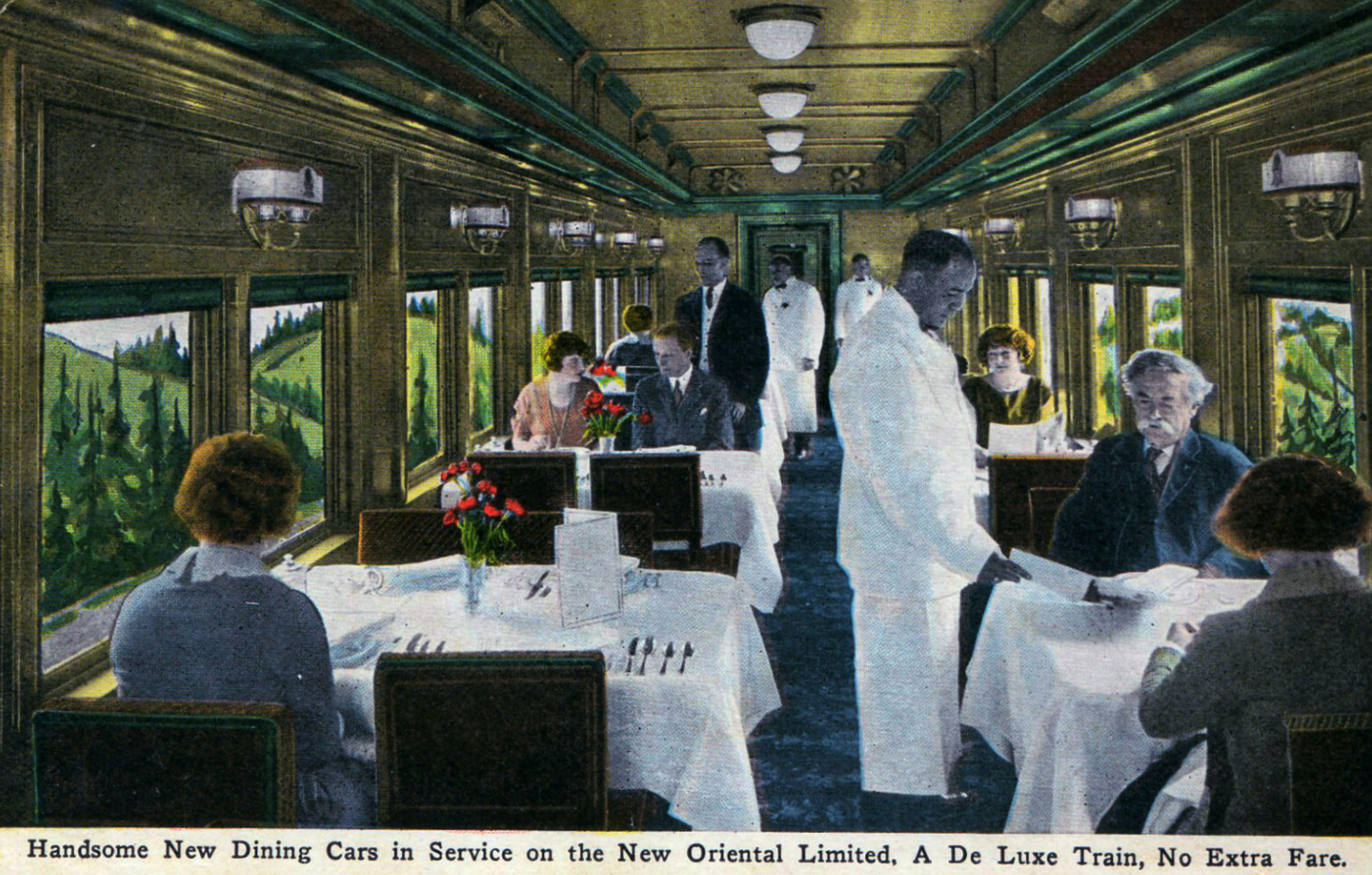
Porters serving in a dining car, circa 1927

A porter was expected to greet passengers, carry baggage, make up the sleeping berths, serve food and drinks brought from the dining car, shine shoes, and keep the cars tidy. He needed to be available night and day to wait on the passengers. He was expected to always smile; thus the porters often called the job, ironically, "miles of smiles".

According to historian Greg LeRoy, "A Pullman Porter was really kind of a glorified hotel maid and bellhop in what Pullman called a hotel on wheels. The Pullman Company thought of the porters as a piece of equipment, just like another button on a panel – the same as a light switch or a fan switch." Porters worked 400 hours a month or 11,000 miles, sometimes as much as 20 hours at a stretch. They were expected to arrive at work several hours early to prepare their car, on their own time; they were charged whenever their passengers stole a towel or a water pitcher. On overnight trips, they were allocated only three to four hours of sleep – and that was deducted from their pay.

A 1926 report by the Brotherhood of Sleeping Car Porters (which finally achieved recognition by the Pullman Company in 1937), using the results of a survey by the Labor Bureau, Inc., stated that the minimum monthly wage for a regular porter was $72.50 (equivalent to $1,318 in 2025), with the average being $78.11, and tips on average amounting to $58.15; however, porters had to pay for their own meals, lodging, uniforms, and shoe-shine supplies, amounting to an average of $33.82 a month.

Overtime pay of 60 cents per 100 miles was paid only for monthly service in excess of 11,000 miles, or about 400 hours of road service in a month. Maids received a minimum of $70 a month, with the same overtime provision, but they received fewer tips. By contrast, Pullman conductors, who already had a recognized union to bargain for them, earned a minimum $150 a month for 240 hours' work. The company offered a health, disability, and life insurance plan for $28 a year, and paid a pension of $18 a month to porters who reached age 70 and had at least 20 years of service. The BSCP booklet also reports that in 1925 the Pullman Company paid out over $10 million in dividends to stockholders from an aggregate net company income of more than $19 million.

"It didn't pay a livable wage, but they made a living with the tips that they got, because the salary was nothing," says Lyn Hughes, founder of the A. Philip Randolph Pullman Porter Museum. The porters were expected to pay for their own meals and uniforms and the company required them to pay for the shoe polish used to shine passengers' shoes daily. There was little job security, and the Pullman Company inspectors were known for suspending porters for trivial reasons.

== Characterization ==
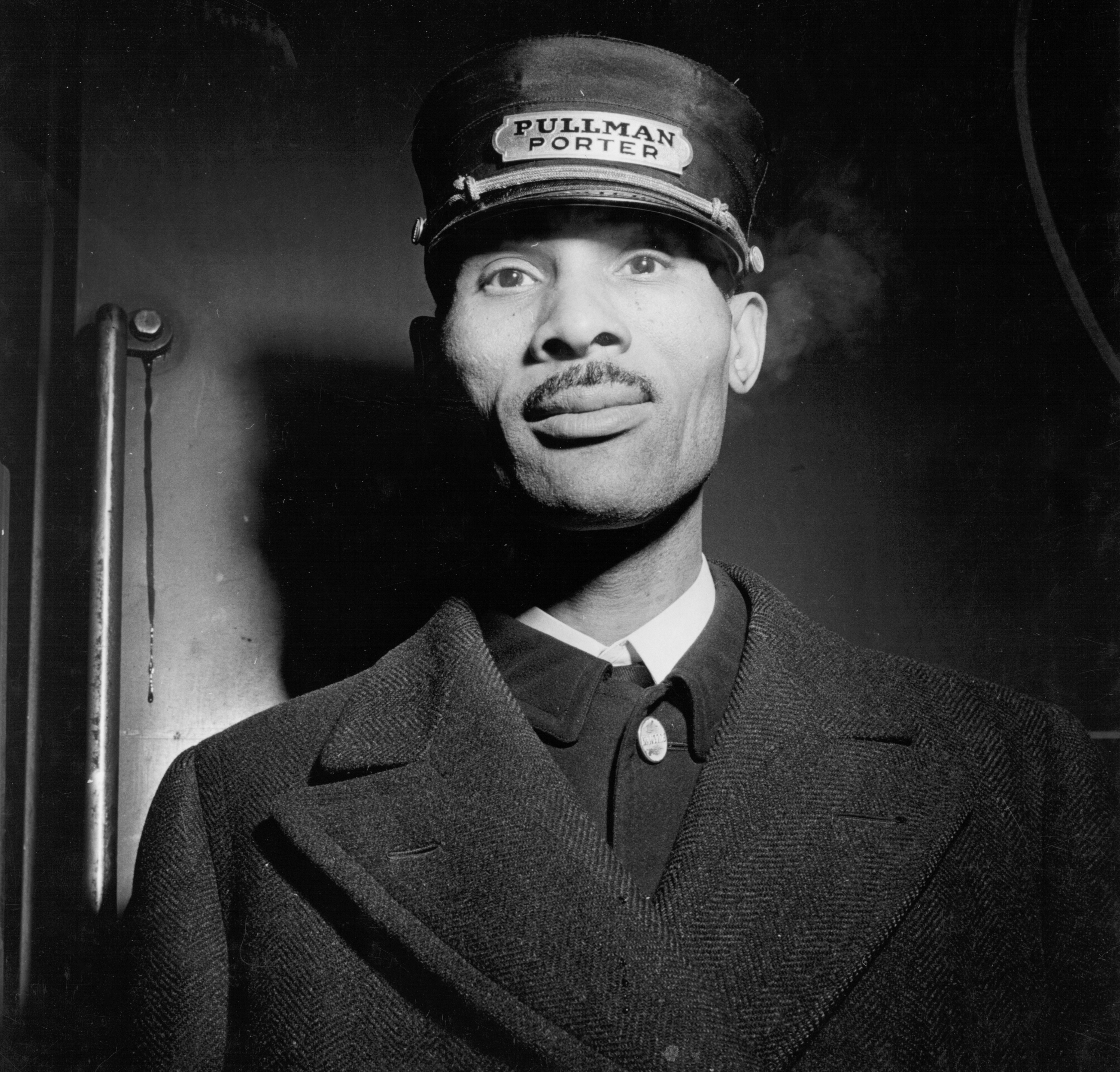
Pullman porter photographed at Chicago Union Station, 1943

According to Larry Tye, who authored Rising from the Rails: The Pullman Porters and the Making of the Black Middle Class, George Pullman was aware that, as former chattel slaves, the men that he hired had already received the perfect training and "knew just how to take care of any whim that a customer had". Tye further explained that Pullman was aware that there was never a question that a traveler would be embarrassed by running into one of the porters and having them remember something that they had done during their trip that they did not want their wife or husband, perhaps, to know about.

Black historian and journalist Thomas Fleming began his career as a bellhop and then spent five years as a cook for the Southern Pacific Railroad. Fleming was the co-founder and executive editor of Northern California's largest weekly African-American newspaper, the Sun-Reporter. In a weekly series of articles entitled "Reflections on Black History", he wrote of the contradictions in the life of a Pullman porter:

Pullman went on to become the largest single employer of blacks in America, and the job of Pullman porter was, for most of the 101-year history of the Pullman Company, one of the very best a black man could aspire to, in status and eventually in pay. The porter reigned supreme on George's sleeper cars. But the very definition of their jobs, of their kingdom, roiled in contradictions. The porter was servant as well as host. He had the best job in his community and the worst on the train. He could be trusted with his white passengers' children and their safety, but only for the five days of a cross-country trip. He shared his riders' most private moments but, to most, remained an enigma if not an enemy.

In 2008, Amtrak became aware of The Pullman Porters National Historic Registry of African American Railroad Employees, a five-year research project conducted by Dr. Lyn Hughes, for the A. Philip Randolph Pullman Porter Museum, and published in 2007. Amtrak enlisted the APR Pullman Porter Museum, and partnered with them using the registry to locate and honor surviving porters through a series of regional ceremonies. Amtrak also attempted to locate additional survivors in order to interview them for a promotional project. A few remaining living former Pullman porters were found, all of whom were in their 90s or over 100 years old at that time. The project coordinator remarked, "Even today, observers are struck by how elegant the elderly men are. When we find them, they are dapper. They are men, even at this age, who wear suits and ties."

== Unionization ==
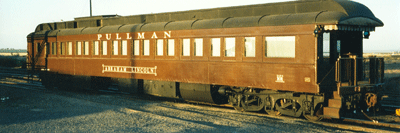
Abraham Lincoln Pullman sleeper car – each car received a name.

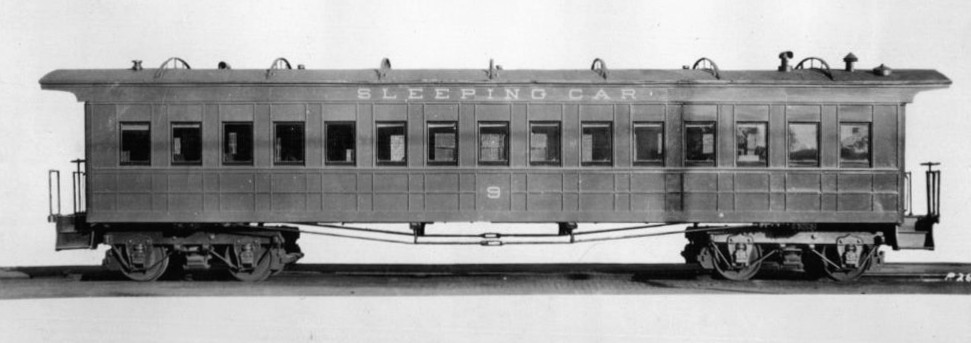
William Crooks locomotive sleeping car, on display in Duluth, Minnesota

As early as 1900, Porters started to rally and organize for better wages and treatment. Porters who worked an average of 300-400 hours per month, were paid a fixed monthly wage regardless of hours or length of trips. They were also subjected to easy dismissal or termination based on minor or false accusations by mainly white passengers. Initial efforts were largely unsuccessful and also increased risk of retributory termination for attempting to unionize.

The Order of Sleeping Car Conductors was organized on February 20, 1918, in Kansas City, Missouri. Members had to be white males; because the order did not admit Black people, A. Philip Randolph began organizing the Brotherhood of Sleeping Car Porters. Using the motto "Fight or Be Slaves", on August 25, 1925, 500 porters met in Harlem and decided to make an effort to organize. Under Randolph's leadership the first black union, the Brotherhood of Sleeping Car Porters, was formed and slowly working conditions and salaries improved.

By forming the first black labor union, the Brotherhood of Sleeping Car Porters, Pullman porters also laid the groundwork for the Civil Rights Movement, which began in the 1950s. Union organizer and former Pullman porter E. D. Nixon played a crucial role in organizing the landmark Montgomery bus boycott in Alabama in 1955. It was he who bailed Rosa Parks out of jail after she refused to move on the bus, and who selected her as the figure to build the boycott around.

By the 1960s, between the decline of the passenger rail system and the cultural shifts in American society, the Pullman porters' contribution became obscured, becoming for some in the African-American community a symbol of subservience to white cultural and economic domination.

In 1978, the Brotherhood of Sleeping Car Porters merged with the larger Brotherhood of Railway and Airline Clerks.

== Contribution to a black middle class ==
The black community looked up to Pullman porters and many people credit them as significant contributors to the development of America's black middle class. Black historian and civil-rights activist Timuel Black observed in a 2013 interview:

[The Pullman porters] were good looking, clean and immaculate in their dress. Their style was quite manly, their language was carefully crafted, so that they had a sense of intelligence about them. They were good role models for young men ... [B]eing a Pullman porter was a prestigious position because it offered a steady income and an opportunity to travel across the country, which was rare for [black people] at that time.

In the late 19th century, Pullman porters were among the only people in their communities to travel extensively. Consequently, they became a conduit of new information and ideas from the wider world to their communities. Many Pullman porters supported community projects, including schools, and saved rigorously to ensure that their children were able to obtain an education and thus better employment. Supreme Court Justice Thurgood Marshall and former San Francisco Mayor Willie Brown were descendants of Pullman porters. Marshall was also a porter himself, as were Malcolm X and the photojournalist Gordon Parks. Berkeley, California Councilman, U.S. Congressman, and Oakland, California Mayor Ron Dellums was also a descendant of Pullman porters. His father was Verney Dellums, a Pullman porter and a longshoreman. His uncle, C.L. Dellums, was a leader in the Brotherhood of Pullman Car Porters union. Ron Dellums served fourteen terms as a Member of the U.S. House of Representatives.

== A. Philip Randolph Pullman Porter Museum ==
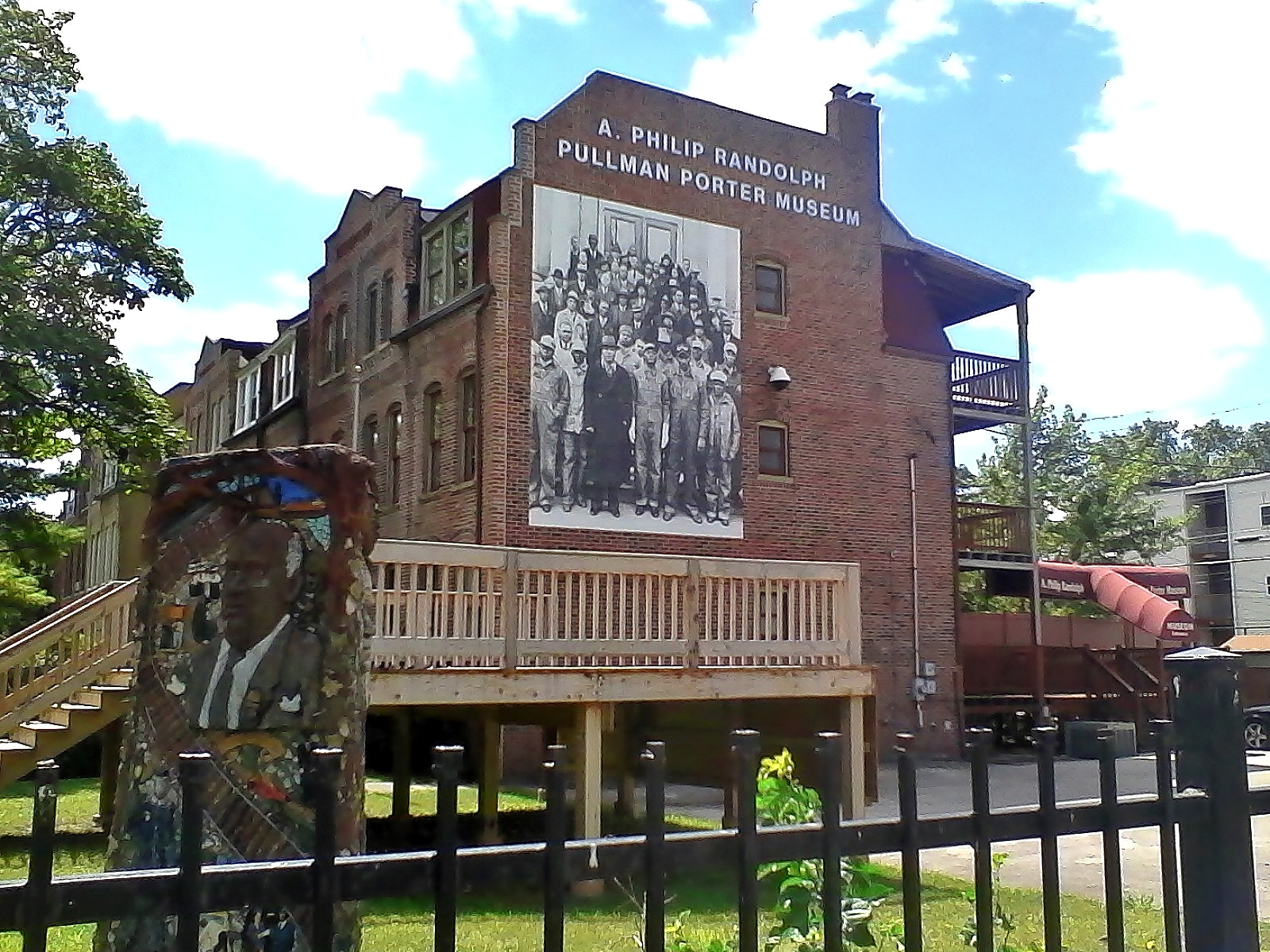
A. Philip Randolph Pullman Porter Museum, Chicago

In 1995, Lyn Hughes founded the A. Philip Randolph Pullman Porter Museum to celebrate both the life of A. Philip Randolph and the role of the Brotherhood of Sleeping Car Porters and other African-Americans in the U.S. labor movement. Located in South Side, Chicago and housed in one of the original rowhouses built by George Pullman to house workers, it is part of the U.S. Department of the Interior's Pullman National Historic Landmark District. The museum houses a collection of artifacts and documents related to the Brotherhood of Sleeping Car Porters. Additionally, in 2001, the museum began compiling a national registry of black railroad employees who worked for the railroad from the late 1800s to 1969.

On March 29, 2025, the museum broke ground at an adjacent rowhouse for the Brotherhood of Sleeping Car Porters Ladies Auxiliary Women's History Museum. It recognizes the efforts of women such as Rosina Corrothers Tucker, the wife of a porter, who was able to organize for the union more freely than the porters themselves. She founded and became president of the Brotherhood's International Ladies' Auxiliary Order, also known as the Women's Economic Councils.

== Recognition ==
In 2008, Amtrak, in partnership with the A. Philip Randolph Museum, honored Pullman porters in Chicago. Museum founder Lyn Hughes spoke at the event saying, "It's significant when an organization like Amtrak takes the time to honor those who contributed directly to its own history. It's also very appropriate as it's the culmination of the effort to create the Pullman Porter Registry. We started the Registry with Amtrak and now we're coming full circle with its completion and the honoring of these great African American men." Hughes is also author of An Anthology of Respect: The Pullman Porter National Historic Registry.

In 2009, as part of Black History Month, Amtrak honored Pullman porters in Oakland, California. An AARP journalist writes, "They were dignified men who did undignified labor. They made beds and cleaned toilets. They shined shoes, dusted jackets, cooked meals and washed dishes in cramped and rolling quarters." Amtrak invited five retired members of The Brotherhood of Sleeping Car Porters to speak at the event. The eldest of the five, Lee Gibson, age 98, spoke of his journey to the event (by rail) saying, "It was nice. I got the service I used to give." He spoke of his years as porter with fondness saying, It was a wonderful life."

In 2009 Philadelphia honored about 20 of the 200 former Pullman employees who were still alive at that time as part of National Train Day. Speaking to Michele Norris of NPR, former cook and porter Frank Rollins, 93, said "the railway wanted Southern boys to run the dining cars because 'they thought they had a certain personality and a certain demeanor that satisfied the Southern passengers better than the boys who came from Chicago.'" Rollins also spoke of the racist comments that black men experienced but commented on positive experiences as well. He recalled, "I used to have a little speech that I'd make. I would walk into the car, and I would say, 'May I have your attention please. My name is Frank Rollins. If you can't remember that, that's OK. You can call me porter – it's right here on the cap, you can be able to remember that. Just don't call me 'boy' and don't call me George.'"

In August 2013, the A. Philip Randolph Pullman Porter Museum celebrated the 50 year anniversary of the historic March on Washington for Jobs and Freedom (also known as "The Great March on Washington"), one of the largest political rallies for human rights in United States history. Interviewed in a neighborhood newspaper, founder Lyn Hughes suggested that some people in the Chicago area may prefer to celebrate the anniversary of the march in their own community rather than travel to Washington. She added that many people are unaware that Asa Philip Randolph was the initial activist who inspired the March on Washington Movement. Scheduled activities included speakers and screenings of films related to black labor history. Two organizers said that two former Pullman porters, Milton Jones (age 98) and Benjamin Gaines (age 90), were expected to attend.

== Notable Pullman porters ==
- Joel Augustus Rogers (1880-1966)
- Big Bill Broonzy
- George W. Griffin, whose award following a successful lawsuit was reduced by a racist ruling in Griffin v. Brady
- Nat Love
- Oscar Micheaux
- E. D. Nixon
- Mancel Warrick, father of Dionne Warwick

== See also ==
- Asukile, Thabiti, "Joel Augustus Rogers' race vindication: a Chicago Pullman Porter & the making of the From Superman to Man (1917)" The Western Journal of Black Studies (Vol. 35, Issue 4), Winter 2011.
- 10,000 Black Men Named George (2002) Movie
- Brotherhood of Sleeping Car Porters – The first African-American trade union
- Gandy dancer
- Miles of Smiles, Years of Struggle (1982) – A documentary about the organization of the Brotherhood of Sleeping Car Porters
- Pullman Company
- Pullman loaf – A type of long, square bread developed to be baked in the small kitchens of rail cars
- Pullman Strike
- Pullman porter affair
- Pullman train (UK)
- Sleeping car
- The Road Taken (1996) – A documentary about Black railway porters in Canada
- The Porter (2022) – A CBC television series which depicts the history of Black Canadian and African-American men who worked as Pullman porters, as well as the creation of the Brotherhood of Sleeping Car Porters
