= Lincoln School (Washington D.C.) =

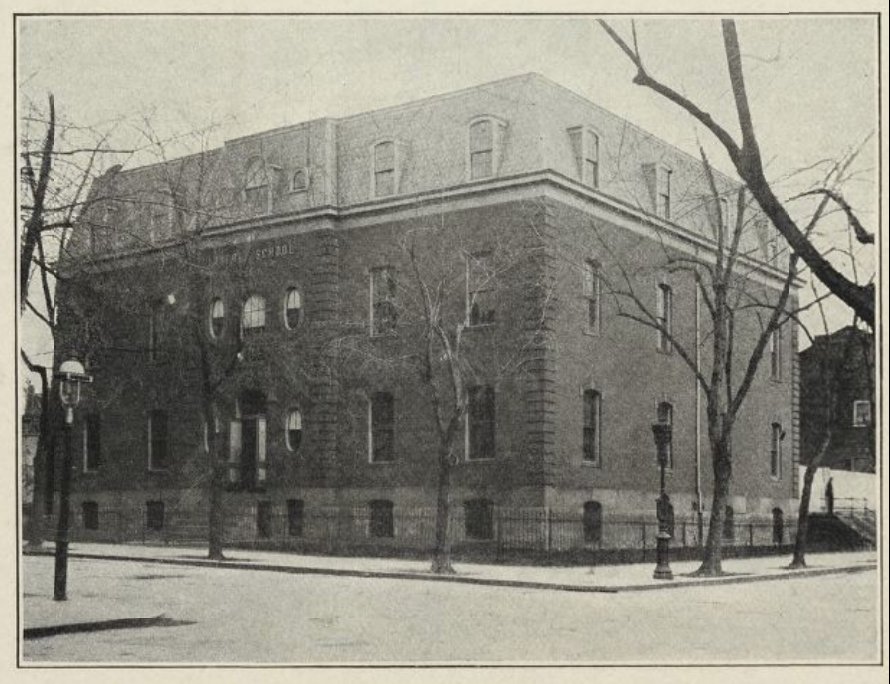

Location
- Capitol Hill; Washington, D.C. 38°53′10″N 77°00′13″W

Information
- Established: 1864

Lincoln School, established in 1864, was a school for African American students in Washington, DC. The school was built after students outgrew classroom space in nearby Little Ebenezer United Methodist Church.

== History ==
In March 1864, the government of the District of Columbia opened a school for African American students of all ages within the Little Ebenezer United Methodist Church. The school, located in the Capitol Hill neighborhood, was the first government-sponsored school for African Americans in Washington, D.C.

Emma V. Brown and Frances W. Perkins were the school's first teachers. Perkins had been sent to Washington by the New England Freedmen's Aid Society of Boston.

The student body quickly outgrew its church space. Perkins, a white woman from New England, returned North and raised the funds needed for the construction of a new school. A lot was purchased in C Street between 2nd and 3rd Streets, SE, and construction on a new school building began.

The new school building opened in winter of 1864 and was named Lincoln School. The building was a two-story structure with two classrooms on each floor. A larger brick building replaced the smaller building in 1871.

The office of the superintendent of 'Colored' schools was located within the school.

Lincoln School operated until 1947 and was later demolished. The Capitol Hill Hotel now stands on the school's former lot.
