= Thaddeus Stevens School (Washington, D.C.) =

- U.S. National Register of Historic Places
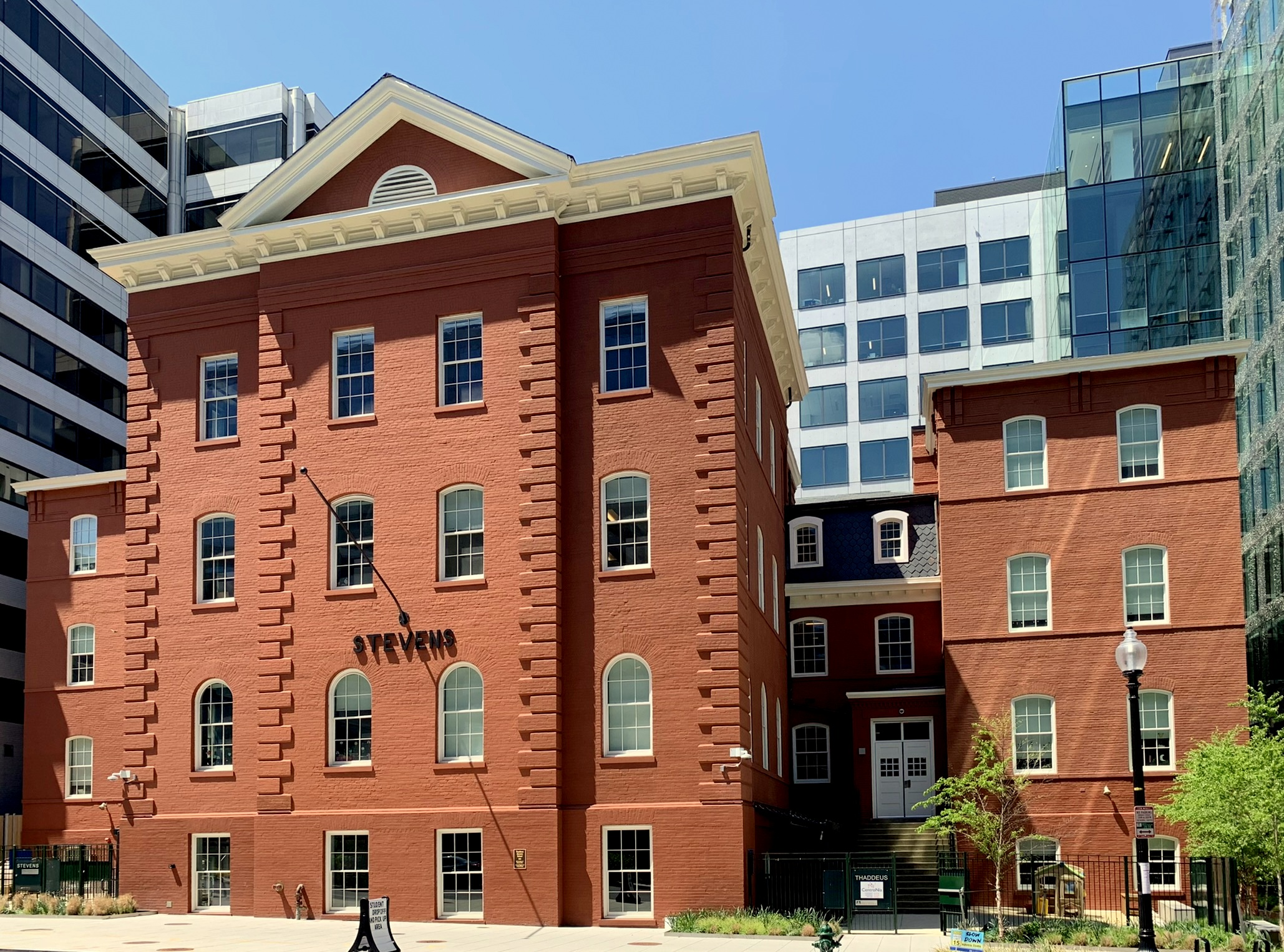
- Thaddeus Stevens School in 2022

- Location within Washington, D.C.
- Location: 1050 21st Street, N.W. Washington, D.C.
- Coordinates: 38°54′11″N 77°2′49″W
- Area: 0.7 acres (0.28 ha)
- Built: 1868
- Architect: Office of the Building Inspector; Alexander Pannell
- Architectural style: Colonial Revival; Romanesque Revival
- NRHP reference No.: 01000706
- Added to NRHP: July 12, 2001

The Thaddeus Stevens School is a historic African American school building located at 1050 21st Street, N.W., in the West End neighborhood of Washington, D.C. It houses classrooms for the nearby and also as an early childhood center.

== History ==
With a 92% increase of freed slaves between 1840 and 1860, a large population of this demographic migrated to wards 1 and 2 of Washington, DC. This is proved by the census data of the wards of Washington, DC from 1860. This influx of freed slaves to the Foggy Bottom neighborhood caused apparent demand for a public school. The Stevens School was erected in 1868 because the city needed a public colored school and the most feasible place to put it was on square 73 which was accessible by both wards 1 and 2. It seemed apt to build a school for freed black in this area, as it was derelict and unsanitary. Within square 73 the school was built on lots 22, 23, and 24. The property that provided the grounds for the Stevens School was initially privately owned by Alfred Jones and his wife in 1868. These lots were bought in 1868 for a combined value of $7,413.14. Once the physical building was built, the final cost was $89,099.17. For the time, this was considered to be inexpensive, both for the land and the development of a public school. In 1932 the American Banking and trust company purchased lot 20. The Stevens School was comparatively smaller than other public, namely white, contemporary institutions such as the Grimke School and Slater School. The Stevens School was under the jurisdiction of the Board of Colored Schools and many of the board members were African American. The D.C Board of Colored Schools was consolidated in 1880 into one Board of Public Schools that had control over both white and black public schools. It was the first government-funded school for African-Americans. Jack Moore of the Associated Press described it as "the cornerstone of D.C.‘s historically African-American West End community".

An addition was built in 1885 and it was partially rebuilt and enlarged again in 1895–96. A pioneering school for African-Americans, it was named for Thaddeus Stevens, the Radical Republican abolitionist congressman from Pennsylvania. The Preparatory High School for Negro Youth was housed in the building after it was founded in 1871 and later moved becoming the M Street High School and ultimately Dunbar High School.

The school's enrollment declined due to gentrification in the 1960s as residential areas became offices. An oral history document at Charles Sumner School Museum and Archives stated that Stevens was located in "virtually an asphalt neighborhood" by 1976. In January 1977 President of the United States Jimmy Carter enrolled his daughter Amy Carter at Stevens. Moore stated that this made the school "one of the most famous schools in America seemingly overnight." At the time it had an extended day program which was uncommon for American schools of the era. According to school counselor Jane Jackson Harley the program was a way to attract enrollment so the school could remain open. Moore stated that this program meant that Stevens began to function as "a sort of magnet school for the children of downtown office workers, and it boosted enrollment back into safe territory."

The building was listed in the District of Columbia Inventory of Historic Sites in 1972 and then on the National Register of Historic Places in 2001.

As of 2001 it was the oldest extant elementary school still being used as a school in the District of Columbia, but soon after was involved in controversy as the district government planned to convert it to residential use.

In 2008, students were moved to the Francis Junior High School campus, becoming the Francis-Stevens Education Campus, due to low enrollment. In 2017, the District of Columbia government announced that the Stevens building would re-open as a child development center for infants and toddlers, as well as extra classroom space for Francis-Stevens.

== Enrollment ==
Enrollment for the Stevens School progressed throughout the years, gaining popularity as the population in wards 1 and 2 increased. The enrollment in 1877, according to The First Report of the Board of Trustees of Public Schools of the District of Columbia, was 980 students. There were also 13 teachers, 715 desks, and 14 classrooms. Additionally, this report reveals the fact that the teachers taught at both the grammar and primary levels, which is equivalent to a K–12 educational structure. Enrollment at the Stevens School grew to as large as 949, just 5 years after its initial opening. The School's value also depreciated to $29,000. The increased enrollment corresponds to the population trends in 1873 as large numbers of freed slaves migrated to wards 1 and 2 of DC. As mentioned above in Section 2, the school had 980 students by 1877 – but only 715 desks. Four years before, in 1873, the building had a mere 14 classrooms. Simply put there were approximately 70 students per classroom and a desk shortage of 265.

== Stevens School fire ==
On January 11, 1876, a fire occurred at the Stevens School that started in an upstairs classroom used by the 4th primary school. As news of the fire quickly spread, children began to panic and storm down the stairs to get out. There were no casualties but there were a few children that sustained minor injuries from being trampled by other students during the commotion. Two small boys jumped from a third floor window but they were caught by spectators in the crowd. Teachers were praised as heroes for the calm and safe manner in which they got the children out of the building. An investigation was later conducted after the incident and the fire was said to be caused by a buildup of waste that was swept into the radiating surface. The rails of the staircase were also damaged due to the pressure that the children exerted on it during the commotion. Total damages weren't expected to exceed $150 or $200 and the damages were covered by insurance.

== Early physical condition (1870s) ==
The school property contained 16,481 square feet; the building was built out of brick and was four stories in height. The buildings held a large assembly hall and 12 school rooms, each room was thirty-eight feet long, twenty-three feet wide, and twelve feet high. The rooms were used for about 750 sittings for the students. Two additions were made to the building in 1873. After the first addition, the school was able to house 14 class rooms and after the second addition five more rooms were added. The physical condition of the building was in shambles, as Superintendent Cook's Report from 1874 to 1875 points out the Stevens School sanitary condition was, “unsatisfactory and in violation of the laws of health, and if not remedied is likely to result in such diseases of diphtheria, typhoid fever, scarlet fever, and such other fevers as result from want of proper ventilation and sewerage”. Referring to Figure 13, it can be seen that the value of the building dropped to $29,000, which is much less than it cost to produce it at $89,099.17. As all of these documents would suggest, the Stevens School was a poor school in a poor neighborhood riddled with danger and disease.

== Importance ==
As one of DC's landmarks as deemed by the National Park Service, the Stevens School is still in its original location on Square 73. As the NPS Statement of Significance says, the Stevens School "is associated with events that have made a significant contribution to the broad patterns of our history," there is no doubt that this building played an important role in developing Foggy Bottom. Its role of bringing public colored education to an unskilled and overpopulated community provided the inhabitants with opportunity and hope for the American Dream.

== Notable alumni ==
- Amy Carter, daughter of President Jimmy Carter, attended fourth and fifth grade at Stevens while her father was in office. She transferred to Rose Hardy Middle School.
- Charles R. Drew, a pioneer in the preservation of blood and plasma who led the American Cross Blood Bank during World War II.
- Roberta Flack, Grammy-winning soul singer.
- Ralph "Petey" Green, television and radio talk-show host.
- Fred Gregory, an Air Force colonel and astronaut, the first African-American to command a space flight.
- Robert Hooks, actor.
- Colbert I. King, columnist and editor for The Washington Post.
- Roman Oben, former NFL player.
- Tony Perkins, news anchor.
- Rayford Whittingham Logan, African-American historian and Pan-African activist.
