= Thomas C. Fleming =

American journalist

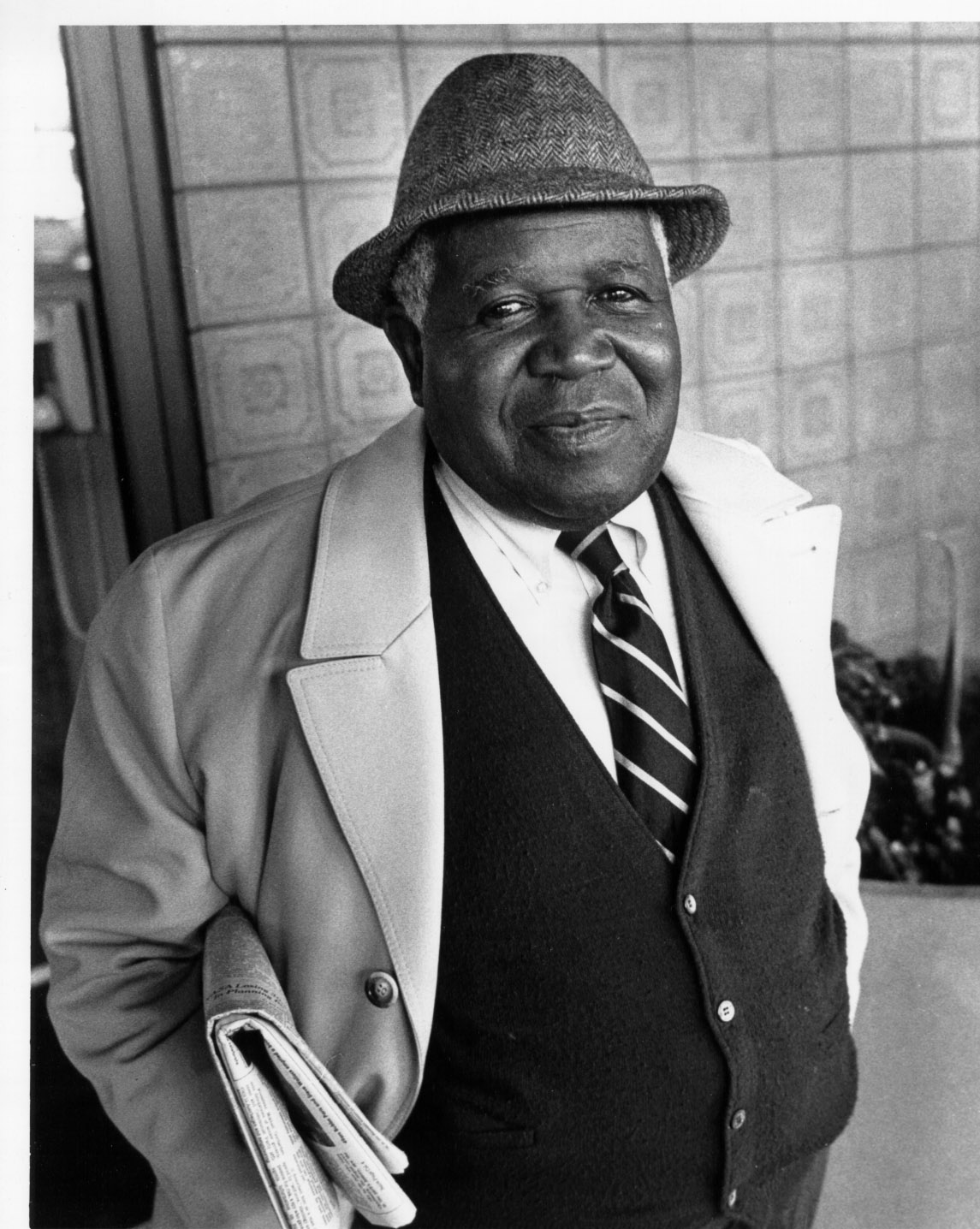
Thomas C. Fleming in 1997

Thomas Courtney Fleming (November 29, 1907 – November 21, 2006), was one of the most influential African American journalists on the West Coast in the 20th century. Starting in 1944, he spent 61 years as an editor, reporter and columnist for the black press in San Francisco. He began his career that year as founding editor of the Reporter – then the city's only black newspaper. In 1948 it merged with the rival Sun to become the Sun-Reporter. Published by Fleming's best friend, civil rights activist and physician Dr. Carlton Goodlett, it remained San Francisco's leading black newspaper throughout Fleming's working life, and is still published weekly.

Fleming retired as executive editor of the Sun-Reporter in 1997, but continued as a columnist until 2005. At the age of 90 he gained a national reputation when his 86-part series, "Reflections on Black History," was syndicated to more than 200 black newspapers through the National Newspaper Publishers Association (Black Press of America). After his death, his memoirs were compiled into a book, In the Black World.

Fleming covered nine national political conventions and met many of the leading black intellectuals and celebrities of his day, including Langston Hughes, A. Philip Randolph, Jackie Robinson, Duke Ellington, Paul Robeson, Malcolm X, Thurgood Marshall, and Dr. Martin Luther King, Jr. He received numerous public honors for his work, including the Career Achievement Award for Print from the Northern California Chapter of the Society of Professional Journalists, an annual scholarship in his name at his alma mater, and accolades in the Congressional Record. On his 90th birthday, the California State Assembly saluted him as the San Francisco Bay Area's "oldest, longest-running continuously active journalist." His memorial service was held at San Francisco City Hall.

== Early life ==
Born in Jacksonville, Florida, in 1907, Fleming was initially raised by his paternal grandmother, who he believed was a former slave. When she died, he spent several years with his father in Harlem, New York City before heading for Chico, a town in north central California, to join his mother and sister. Following graduation from Chico High School, he moved to the Bay Area. From 1926 to 1932 he worked as a waiter on board coastal ships and as a railroad cook, primarily for the Southern Pacific.

When the Great Depression swallowed up his employment, he enrolled at Chico State College (today the California State University, Chico), but left without earning a degree. In 1934, he worked briefly as a columnist for the Oakland Tribune, which made him the only black journalist for a daily newspaper on the West Coast; no other would follow for almost 30 years. That same year, he began working as an unpaid writer for the Spokesman, a progressive black newspaper in San Francisco.

== Early newspaper career ==
In 1935 he was hired by the Federal Writers' Project at the University of California, Berkeley. With the advent of World War II, he began working as a machinist for the U.S. Navy. His big break came in June 1944, when a "chance meeting with a guy on the street" in San Francisco led him to an interview with Frank Logan, a local black businessman who was planning to launch a black newspaper, the Reporter, and needed an editor. Fleming volunteered to do the job without pay. For the next year, he worked at the Naval shipyard at night and reported for the newspaper in the daytime.

Fleming was indignant that the Key System, which operated the transit system in Oakland, would not hire any black bus drivers or streetcar operators. He recalled: "I started writing editorials saying that if blacks could drive those big army rigs, they could drive those buses on the street too. They were demonstrating in front of the Key System's office, carrying placards denouncing Jim Crow practices in hiring."

In February 1945, although he was the sole supporter of his invalid mother and two years over the age limit of 35, Fleming was drafted into the U.S. Army. A woman at the draft board told him in confidence, "They don't like those editorials you're writing." He spent seven months in uniform, then returned to his desk at the newspaper. In 1947 he was chosen as one of the 12 members of the first class of the Fellows Program in Public Affairs for the Coro organization, which granted scholarships to veterans. Through the program, he became an intern in the office of future California Governor Edmund G. "Pat" Brown while continuing his newspaper work.

== Sun-Reporter career ==
Fleming's closest friend since 1935 was Carlton Goodlett, an African American scholar from Omaha, who earned a Ph.D. at UC Berkeley in 1938 at age 23, then left to attend medical school in Nashville. During the war, San Francisco's black population grew by more than 665 percent, and Fleming urged Goodlett to return to the Bay Area and establish a medical practice there. Goodlett took the advice, and soon became so prosperous that he was able to invest heavily in the Reporter. Fleming's career reached new heights after Goodlett won the Sun newspaper in a poker game and combined the papers. Later Goodlett added a black newspaper from Oakland, the California Voice, and formed the Reporter Publishing Company.

The Goodlett-Fleming partnership gave voice to all the major civil rights struggles in San Francisco, such as the hiring practices of the police and fire departments, public transportation companies, hotels and automobile dealerships; discrimination by hospitals, landlords, city government and the media; police brutality; and the dismantling of the city's major black neighborhood by the urban renewal program, which local blacks cynically dubbed "Negro removal."

Fleming got the inside story on everything from the city's race riot of 1966 and the student strike at San Francisco State University – which gave birth to the nation's first ethnic studies department in 1969 – to the Jonestown tragedy of November 1978, which claimed more than 900 lives.

The Sun-Reporter's political power first became evident in 1949, when Cecil F. Poole was named San Francisco's first black district attorney after receiving the newspaper's endorsement. Eventually Poole was appointed to the U.S. District Court of Appeals, a first for an African American in Northern California.

In the 1960s, the newspaper helped Terry Francois become the first African American elected to the San Francisco Board of Supervisors. Over the years, hundreds of candidates – both black and white – entered the Sun-Reporter's offices to seek endorsements.

In 1962, on Fleming's recommendation, Sun-Reporter alumnus Ben Williams was hired by the San Francisco Examiner, becoming the first African-American reporter for any daily paper in the Bay Area. Belva Davis, the first African-American female television reporter on the West Coast, also cut her journalistic teeth at the Sun-Reporter.

== Later years ==
Carlton Goodlett died in 1997. That year the address of San Francisco City Hall was renamed 1 Dr. Carlton B. Goodlett Place by then-Mayor Willie L. Brown Jr., whose political career had been kick-started by the Sun-Reporter.

From 1963 to 1997, Fleming held court at the Sun-Reporter building in San Francisco's Fillmore district, writing articles, receiving phone calls, and greeting visitors as they entered. But in April 1997, when the newspaper moved across town to the Bayview district – which had replaced the Fillmore as the city's largest African American neighborhood – Fleming retired from his day-to-day duties. He continued writing at home on a manual Royal typewriter. Over the years he produced an estimated 2500 words per week, for a total of about eight million words in print.

His black history writings and his status as the nation's oldest working black journalist brought him a new celebrity, which led to speaking engagements at colleges, bookstores, libraries, and civic organizations. He was interviewed for several documentaries and profiled by mainstream newspapers throughout California.

Fleming came of age when black journalists had few opportunities to work for the white-owned mainstream press. But upon his retirement, he expressed no regret for spending his entire career with the black press. "I was a good soldier," he said. "I was more interested in accomplishing one of my goals – to see that we had a black newspaper here in San Francisco. I never did think about the income as much as other people might have thought. Because my needs were very simple ... and as long as I could take care of my personal needs, and purchase all these books through the years, and the records and things like that, that's about all I wanted out of life."

Fleming continued writing columns for the Sun-Reporter until December 2005, when he was 98. A lifelong bachelor, he lived alone at his San Francisco apartment, cooking for himself, until the last year of his life, when he moved to the Marymount Villa Retirement Center in San Leandro, California. He died there of congestive heart failure on November 21, 2006.

The Thomas C. Fleming papers, including photographs, certificates, programs, manuscripts, and newspaper clippings documenting his life and career as a journalist, are housed at the African American Museum and Library at Oakland, California. The collection is open to the public.
