= Belva Davis =

American journalist (1932–2025)

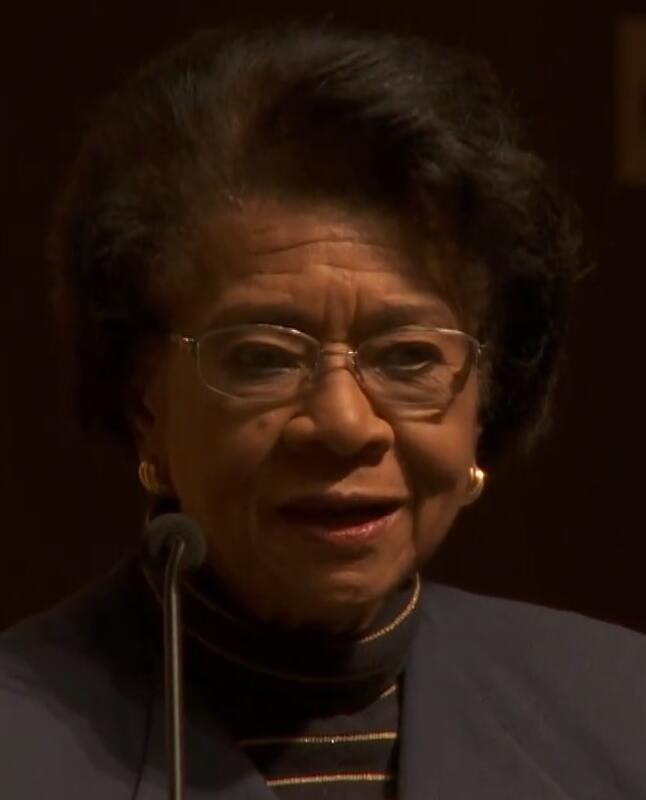
- Davis in 2015
- Born: Belvagene Melton; October 13, 1932; Monroe, Louisiana, U.S.
- Died: September 24, 2025 (aged 92); Oakland, California, U.S.
- Occupations: Television and radio broadcaster; news anchor
- Years active: 1957–2012
- Spouses: Frank Davis (divorced); Bill Moore (m. 1967)

Belvagene Davis (née Melton; October 13, 1932 – September 24, 2025) was an American television and radio journalist. She was the first African-American woman to become a television reporter on the U.S. West Coast. She won eight Emmy Awards and was recognized by the American Women in Radio and Television and National Association of Black Journalists.

After growing up in Oakland, California, Davis began writing freelance articles for magazines in 1957. Within a few years, she began reporting on radio and television. As a reporter, Davis covered many important events of the day, including issues of race, gender, and politics. She became an anchorwoman and hosted her own talk show, before retiring in 2012.

== Early life ==
Belvagene Melton was born in Monroe, Louisiana, on October 13, 1932, to John and Florence Melton. She was the oldest of four children. Her mother was 14 years old at Belva's birth, and Belva spent her early years living with various relatives. When she was eight years old, Belva and her family, including aunts and cousins, moved to a two-bedroom apartment in the West Oakland neighborhood of Oakland, California. Eleven people lived in the apartment. Davis later said about her youth, "I learned to survive. And, as I moved from place to place, I learned to adapt. When I got older, I just figured I could become whatever it was that I needed to become."

By the late 1940s, her parents were able to afford a house in Berkeley, California. Davis graduated from Berkeley High School in 1951, becoming the first member of her family to graduate from high school. She applied and got accepted into San Francisco State University but couldn't afford to attend college. She went to work as a typist at the Oakland Naval Supply Depot, earning $2,000 a year.

== Journalism career ==
Davis accepted a freelance assignment in 1957 for Jet, a magazine focusing on African-American issues, and became a stringer for the publication. She received $5 per piece with no byline. Over the next few years, she began writing for other African-American publications, including the Sun Reporter and Bay Area Independent. Davis edited the Sun Reporter from 1961 through 1968.

In 1961, Davis became an on-air interviewer for KSAN, a San Francisco AM radio station broadcasting a rhythm and blues music format, targeting black listeners in the Bay Area. She made her television debut in 1963 for KTVU, an Oakland-based television station, covering an African-American beauty pageant. She worked as a disc jockey for KDIA, a soul-gospel radio station (also based in Oakland) when the 1964 Republican National Convention, located at the Cow Palace in nearby Daly City, California, inspired her to become a reporter. According to Davis's account, while she was covering the convention with Louis Freeman, the two were chased out of the Cow Palace by convention attendees throwing food at them and yelling racial slurs. It would not be the last time she encountered racism on the job: In 1967 she covered a march during the Civil Rights Movement in Forsyth County, Georgia, and attempted to interview a white woman who spat in her face.

Davis worked for KNEW, an AM radio station located in Oakland, as an announcer in 1966. She became the first female African-American television journalist on the West Coast when she was hired by KPIX-TV, the CBS affiliate based in San Francisco, in 1966. She spent the next three decades working in Bay Area television, first for KPIX (becoming an anchorwoman in 1970), and a few years later moved to what was then the local NBC affiliate, KRON-TV. Stories she covered include the Berkeley riots of the Free Speech Movement, the Black Panthers, the mass suicide-murder at Jonestown, the Moscone–Milk assassinations, the AIDS and crack epidemics, and the 1998 United States embassy bombing in Tanzania.

For 18 years beginning in 1981, she and Rollin Post co-hosted the KRON's Sunday-morning show "California This Week."

Davis hosted "This Week in Northern California" on PBS member station KQED, starting in the 1990s. She retired in November 2012. Her final broadcast included a taped interview with Maya Angelou, a personal friend, as she wanted the theme of her final show to be friendship.

Davis was highly regarded for her coverage of politics and issues of race and gender, as well as her calm demeanor. Rita Williams, a reporter for KTVU, said "Belva knew instinctively how to keep everyone in check. Amid all these prima donnas, she had so much class, so much presence, so much intuition. Belva has always been the grande dame."

Her autobiography, entitled Never in My Wildest Dreams: A Black Woman's Life in Journalism, was published in 2010. In the foreword, Bill Cosby wrote that she had symbolic value to the African-American television audience, as "someone who sustained us, who made us proud." He wrote that "We looked forward to seeing her prove the stereotypical ugliness of those days to be wrong."

== Personal life and death ==
Belva married Frank Davis on January 1, 1952. The couple had two children, and a granddaughter. Davis met her second husband, Bill Moore, in 1967 while working at KPIX-TV. Davis and Moore lived in the San Francisco neighborhood of Presidio Heights, and later lived in Petaluma, California. Belva Davis, a private person, separated her personal life from her professional life for most of her journalistic life. In 1975, Davis allowed an African-American woman and American Women in Radio and TV member, Kathleen H. Arnold (today anthropologist Kathleen Rand Reed), to produce Belva Davis – This is Your Life. Davis mentored Reed for decades.

Davis served on the boards of Museum of the African Diaspora, the Institute on Aging, and the Fine Arts Museums of San Francisco. Davis raised $5 million for the Museum of the African Diaspora in one year.

Davis died in Oakland, California, from a long illness on September 24, 2025, at the age of 92.

=== Tribute ===
Davis' successor, Thuy Vu paid tribute and attended Davis' funeral, held at Grace Cathedral in San Francisco on November 10, 2025. Vu wrote on LinkedIn, "She not only kicked down doors but made sure the doors remained open for those who followed, including me. I became anchor of KQED TV Channel 9's current affairs program - KQED Newsroom - after she retired."

Then, Vu's successor, Priya David Clemens also paid tribute to Davis as well. Clemens wrote on LinkedIn, "When I anchored KQED Newsroom, I was grounded in a remarkable history. Belva Davis led the path as the very first anchor of the show, which was started during a SF Chronicle strike."

Former KRON-TV anchor Pam Moore pays tribute to Davis saying, "She is a legend and she was a mentor, a friend, a mom… You don’t work in California and journalism as a person of color and not know about Belva Davis."

== Honors ==
Davis won eight Emmy Awards from the San Francisco / Northern California chapter. She was an honorary member of Alpha Kappa Alpha. She received lifetime achievement awards from the American Women in Radio and Television and National Association of Black Journalists.

== Bibliography ==
- Davis, Belva; Haddock, Vicki (2011). Never in My Wildest Dreams: A Black Woman's Life in Journalism. Polipoint Press. ISBN 978-1-936227-06-8.
