= Miles of Smiles, Years of Struggle =

- Produced by: Jack Santino; Paul Wagner
- Release date: 1982
- Country: United States

Miles of Smiles, Years of Struggle is a 1982 documentary film about a group of Pullman car porters who organized the Brotherhood of Sleeping Car Porters - claimed to be the first African American trade union. The film examines issues of work, race and dignity. The film uses a variety of sources including historical records and photos, old films, and interviews with and reminiscences of retired porters. The film is narrated by a porter's widow and former union organizer: Rosina Tucker.

The film was produced by Jack Santino and Paul Wagner and won four regional Emmy Awards. It has been described as "One hundred years of history is spanned in an enlightening portrait of admirable dignity." – New York Times and as "A moving account of the Pullman porters' remarkable (and largely untold) history." – Washington Post.

In addition to its four regional Emmy Awards, the film has also been honoured at the Telluride Film Festival, and received the American Film Festival Blue Ribbon, and a CINE Golden Eagle. The film was funded by the D.C. Community Humanities Council.

== See also ==
- The Road Taken, a 1996 documentary film about Black Canadian railway porters
