= Sun-Reporter =

Newspaper in San Francisco, US

- A news journal dedicated to the cause of the people
- Type: Weekly newspaper
- Founded: 1943
- Headquarters: 1286 Fillmore Street, San Francisco, California 94115
- Website: thesunreporter.com

The Sun-Reporter is an American weekly newspaper serving the African-American community of San Francisco.

== History ==
The newspaper was founded in 1943. When Carlton Benjamin Goodlett, the paper's longtime owner, died in 1997, Amelia Ashley-Ward became the paper's proprietor. The Sun-Reporter owns the regions two other black weeklies, the California Voice and the Metro Reporter.

Notable journalists associated with the paper include Thomas C. Fleming and Belva Davis.
