= Betty Kronman Shapiro =

American Jewish activist

- Born: Rebecca Kronman; September 26, 1907; Washington, D.C.
- Died: March 18, 1989 (aged 81)
- Organization: B'nai B'rith Women
- Title: President
- Awards: District of Columbia Commission on Women's Hall of Fame

Rebecca "Betty" Kronman Shapiro (September 26, 1907 – March 18, 1989) was an American women's rights and Jewish activist from Washington, D.C. A long-time member of B'nai B'rith Women, Shapiro became its international president in 1968. She was also a three-time delegate to the United Nations conference on women, as well as chairing a host of civic organizations serving Washington, D.C. In 1998, she was inducted into District of Columbia Commission on Women's Hall of Fame.

== Early life ==
Rebecca Kronman, called Betty, was born in Washington, D.C., on September 26, 1907 to Nathan Kronman, a grocer, and Monya "Mollie" (Bogorod) Kronman, who was active in a number of different Jewish community organizations. Rebecca attended Business High School, where she played on several championship basketball teams, even receiving an offer of a contract to play professionally (she declined).

== Career ==
From 1924 to 1929, Kronman worked as school secretary at Langley Junior High School and then, from 1920 until 1943, as office manager of the Washington, D.C., branch of the Hebrew Immigrant Aid Society, resettling hundreds of fleeing Jewish immigrants in the D.C. area during the Holocaust.

Kronman married Michael Shapiro on July 5, 1936, and was thereafter known as Betty Kronman Shapiro or variations thereon (Betty Shapiro, Betty Kay Shapiro, Betty K. Shapiro). The same year, at 29, she served as president of the Washington, D.C. section of the National Council of Jewish Juniors. She founded and served as an officer in the Service Council of the Washington Jewish Community Center during World War II.

For over 40 years, she was active with B'nai B'rith Women, a Jewish women's service and advocacy group. She was founder and a member of the Abram Simon Chapter, Washington, DC (1952 to 1989); president of the D.C. Argo Chapter (1952 to 1953), regional president for the Eastern Seaboard District 5 (1955 to 1956), and international president (1968 to 1971), heading the then-140,000-member organization. Particularly influential was her establishment of the Public Affairs Program, forming a relationship between the group and government officials and contributing to the group's transformation from service organization to one focused on advocacy. As president, Shapiro used this influence to promote civil rights, abortion rights and the Equal Rights Amendment.

A women's rights activist, Shapiro was a three-time delegate to the United Nations conferences on women: in Houston in 1977, Copenhagen in 1980 and Nairobi in 1985. She chaired the Jewish Women's Caucus at the 1980 and 1985 conference.

Vigorously engaged in civic life especially focused on the Washington, D.C., area, Shapiro also served on the boards or executive committees of the Anti-Defamation League, National Woman's Party, the Jewish Community Council of Greater Washington, the Washington Conference of Christians and Jews, the International Development Conference and the Capital Area Division of United Nations Association-USA. She was also Washington area chair of the Community Chest, the Red Cross, the March of Dimes and Cancer Crusade, and was president of the Van Ness North Tenants Association. In 1998, she was inducted into District of Columbia Commission on Women's Hall of Fame.

== Personal life ==
Shapiro and her husband had no children. Michael Shapiro died on November 23, 1976. Betty died of cancer at the National Institutes of Health Medical Center on March 18, 1989. She was survived by two sisters.
