= Society for the Prevention of Calling Sleeping Car Porters "George" =

Joke organization

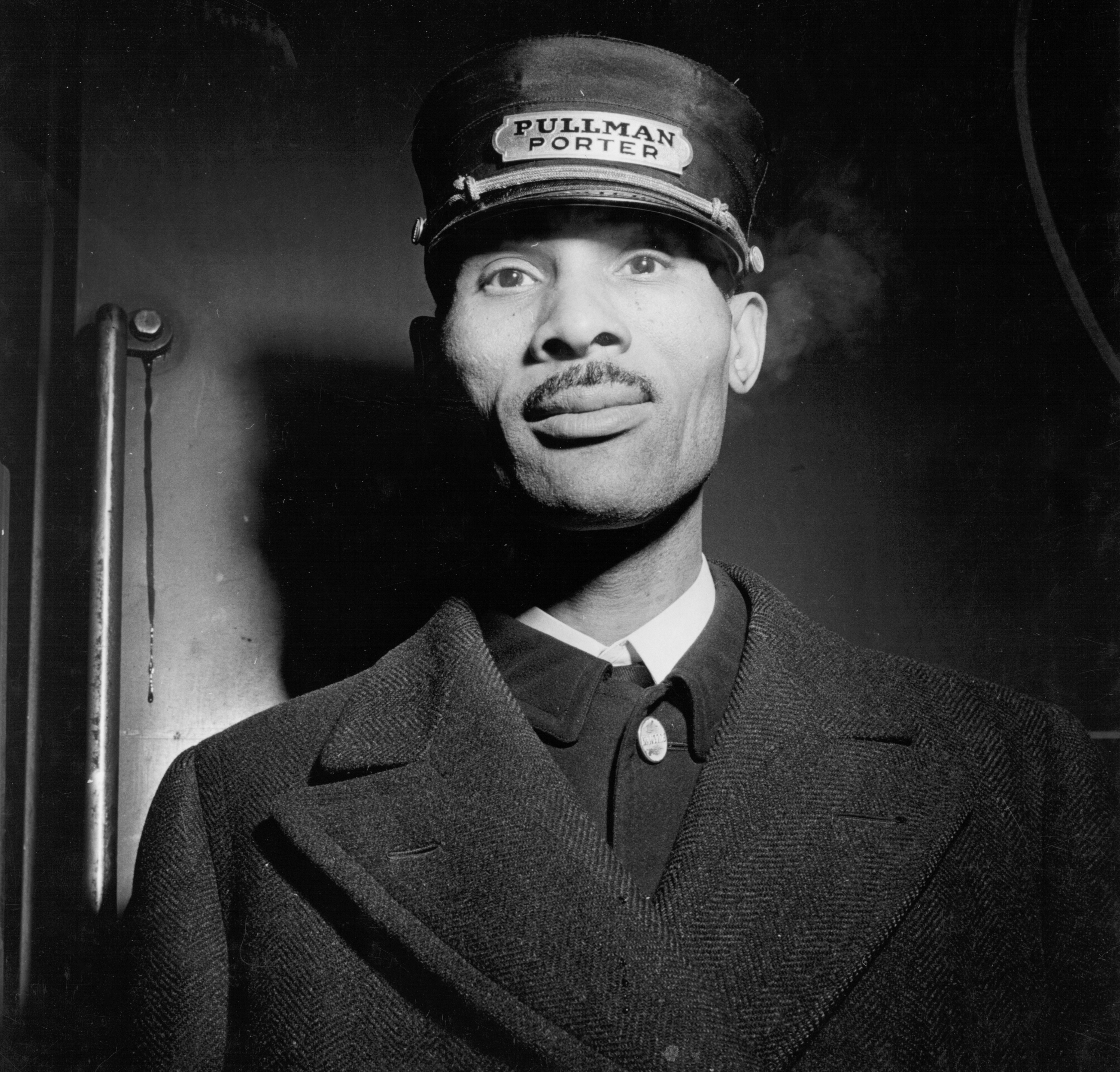
A Pullman porter in 1943

The Society for the Prevention of Calling Sleeping Car Porters "George" (SPCSCPG) was founded as a joke by lumber baron George W. Dulany in 1914. Membership was open to all those whose first or last name was George. Its early members included Admiral George Dewey, who served as the group's first president, and writer George Ade. Dulany's secretary filled out and mailed more than 45,000 membership cards to people named "George" throughout the world, before Dulany retired from public life.

== Rationale ==
At the time, railway sleeping car porters in the United States were commonly referred to by the name "George" regardless of their actual name. The appellation may have stemmed from the name of George Pullman of the Pullman Company, which at one time manufactured and operated a large proportion of all the sleeping cars in North America. Porters were almost exclusively Black, and the practice presumably derived from the old custom of naming slaves after their masters, in this case porters being regarded as servants of George Pullman.

Although founded as a joke, it nevertheless had some effects for all porters. In 1926, the SPCSCPG persuaded the Pullman Company to install small racks in each car, displaying a card with the given name of the porter on duty. Of the 12,000 porters and waiters then working for Pullman, only 362 turned out to be named George.

At its peak, the society claimed to have 31,000 members, including King George V of the United Kingdom, American baseball player George Herman "Babe" Ruth, Georgia Senator Walter F. George and French politician Georges Clemenceau.

== See also ==
- Brotherhood of Sleeping Car Porters

== Sources ==
- Larry Tye (July 6, 2004). Rising from the Rails: Pullman Porters and the Making of the Black Middle Class. Henry Holt. ISBN 0-8050-7075-3.
- Tye, Larry. "Choosing Servility To Staff America's Trains", AFP Reporter (volume 21, number 1), 2003. Retrieved December 4, 2012.
- "Names make news." December 7, 1936, Time Magazine. Retrieved June 21, 2007.
