= The Road Taken =

1996 film by Selwyn Jacob

The Road Taken is a 1996 documentary about the experiences of Black Canadian sleeping car porters who worked on Canada's railways from the early 1900s through the 1960s.

Directed by Selwyn Jacob and written and narrated by Frederick Ward, the film explores how racism prevented Blacks from being promoted, until porter Lee Williams took his fight to the union in 1955 and successfully claimed discrimination under Canada's Fair Employment Practices Act.

The film features the music of jazz musician Joe Sealy, whose father was a porter. Coproduced by Jacobs with the National Film Board of Canada, the film received the Canada Award in 1998 from the Academy of Canadian Cinema and Television.

== See also ==
- Miles of Smiles, Years of Struggle, a 1982 documentary film about African American railway porters
