= Charles Sumner School =

- U.S. National Register of Historic Places
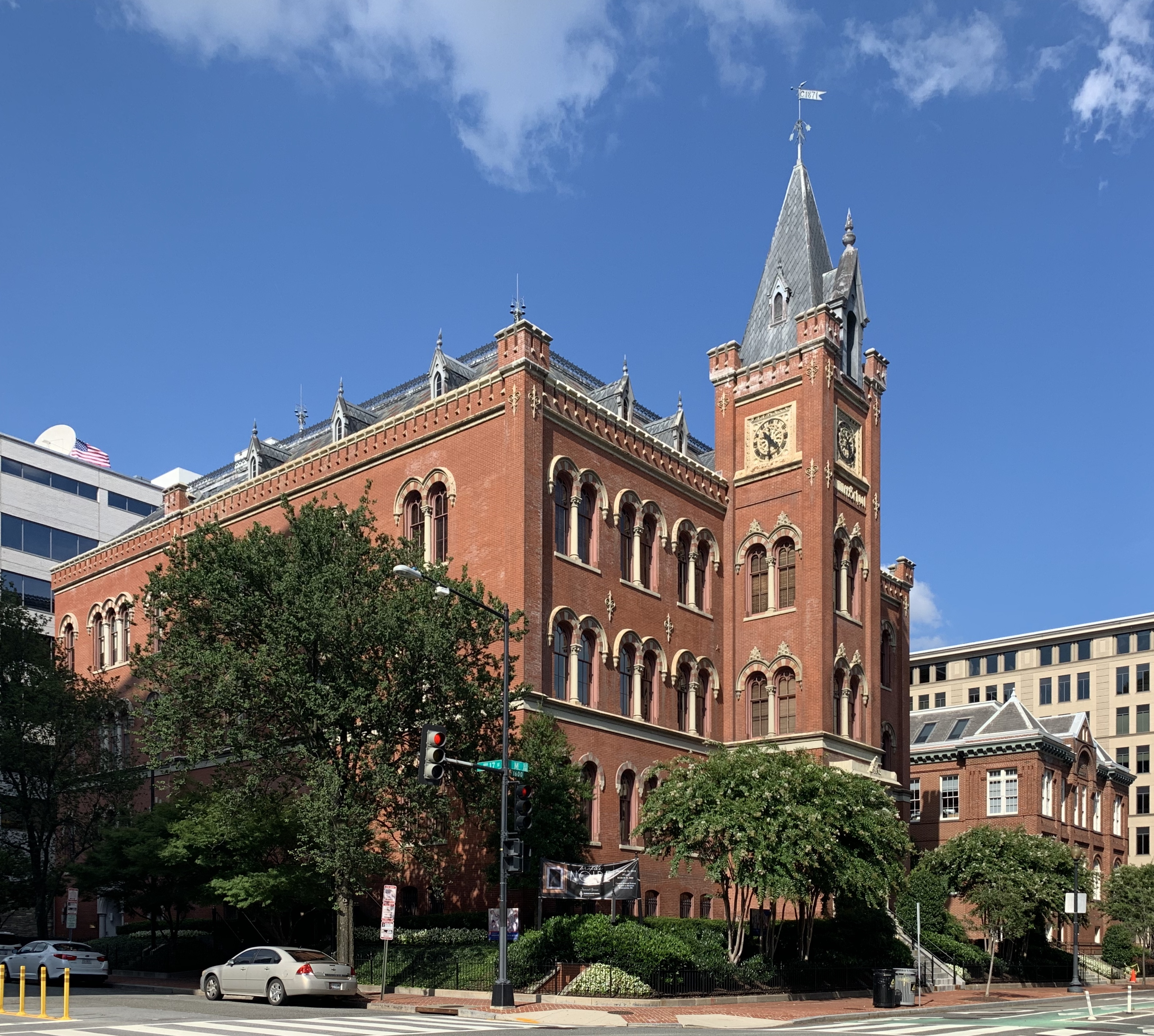
- Charles Sumner School in 2020

- Location within Central Washington, D.C. Location within the District of Columbia Location within the United States
- Location: 1201 17th Street, NW; Washington, D.C.
- Coordinates: 38°54′21″N 77°2′18″W
- Area: 0.3 acres (0.12 ha)
- Built: 1872
- Architect: Adolf Cluss; Robert I. Fleming
- Architectural style: Romanesque Revival
- NRHP reference No.: 79003150
- Added to NRHP: December 20, 1979

The Charles Sumner School, established in 1872, was one of the earliest schools for African Americans in Washington, D.C. Named for the prominent abolitionist and United States Senator Charles Sumner, the school became the first teachers' college for black citizens in the city and the headquarters of its segregated school system for African American students. It currently houses a small museum, a research room, art exhibits, and the archives of the District of Columbia Public Schools.

== Construction and naming ==
The Charles Sumner School was built on land that had previously been used as a school site by the Freedmen's Bureau, created after the Civil War to provide support for freed slaves. The school was named for Charles Sumner, a prominent abolitionist and United States Senator from Massachusetts who fought, among other things, for the abolition of slavery in the District of Columbia and for the right of black citizens to use streetcars in that city. The building was designed by prominent Washington architect Adolf Cluss, a task for which he would receive a design award at the 1873 Vienna Exposition. The school opened in 1872.

== Use as a school ==
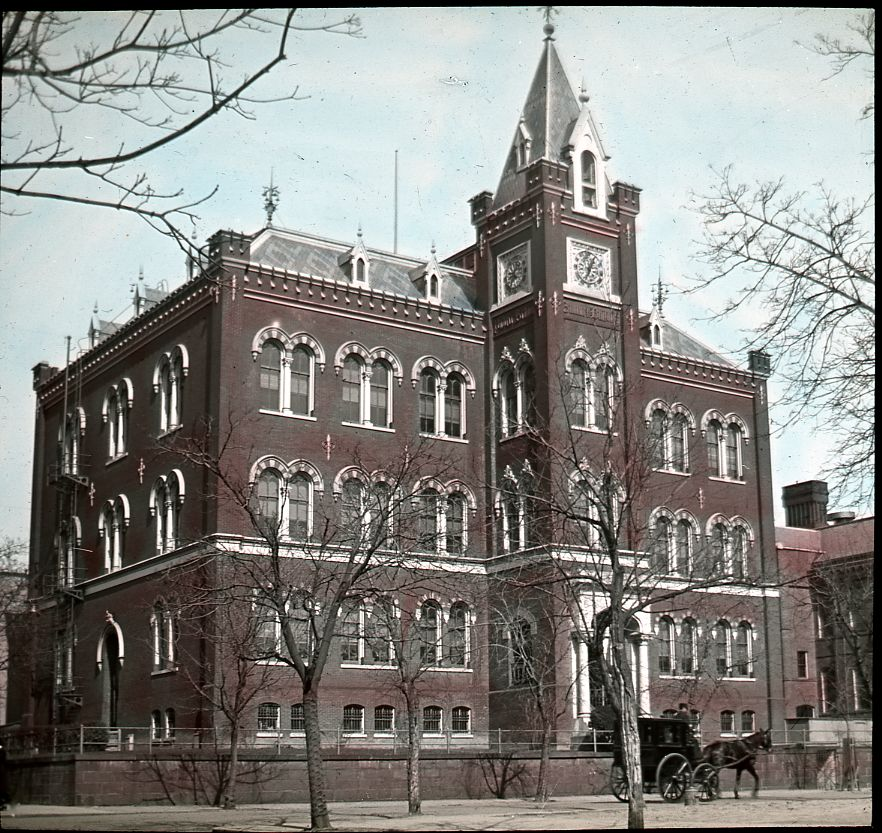
Charles Sumner School, c. 1890

An Act of Congress in 1862 had required the creation of schools for black children in Washington, D.C. However, it was not until 1873 that the responsibility for administration of the schools was removed from federal agencies and placed in local hands. At that point, separate superintendents were appointed to administer the education of white and black children in the city. Charles Sumner School was one of the first schools in this new school system, housing elementary school classes as well as the high school that eventually became Dunbar High School, graduating its first high school students in 1877. That same year, the school was renamed the Myrtilla Miner Normal School and became the District's first teacher's college for African Americans. In addition to its role as a school, the building served as headquarters of the Superintendent and Board of Trustees of the separate school system for black students.

== Use as a museum ==
By the 1980s the building had fallen into disrepair. Led by Richard Hurlbut, citizens of the district raised the $5 million necessary to renovate the building, a project that lasted two years, from 1984 to 1986. The newly renovated building, renamed the Charles Sumner School Museum and Archives, was used to house a museum, of which Hurlbut himself was curator, as well as the District of Columbia Public School Archives and associated reading rooms and meeting space. The D.C. Women's Hall of Fame is also located at the Charles Sumner School. It is also used for exhibit space by local artists and organizations. The building was added to the District of Columbia Inventory of Historic Sites in 1978, and to the National Register of Historic Places in 1979.

== See also ==
- Mildred E. Gibbs, a principal
- List of museums in Washington, D.C.
- National Register of Historic Places listings in the District of Columbia
- Normal School for Colored Girls
