= Richard Mansell (disambiguation) =

Richard Mansell (1813–1904) was an English railway engineer, on the South Eastern Railway.

Richard Mansell may also refer to:

- Richard Maunsell (1868–1944), railway engineer (particularly on the South Eastern and Chatham Railway and later the Southern Railway)
- Richard Mansell (golfer) (born 1995), English golfer
- Richard Mansell, High Sheriff of Carmarthenshire
- Richard Mansel, various baronets of Muddlescombe, in the County of Carmarthen
