= Mansell wheel =

Railway wheel

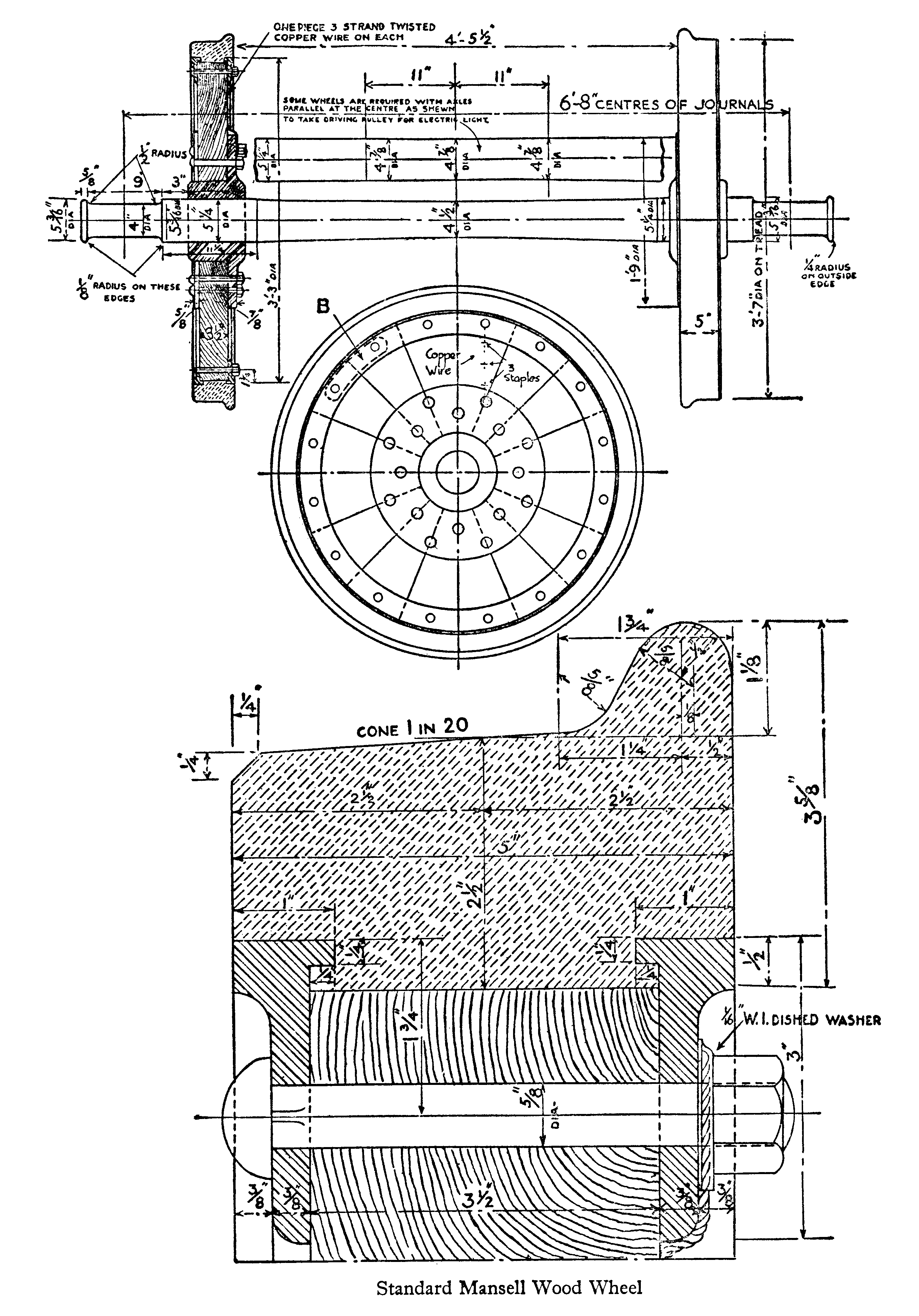

The Mansell wheel is a railway wheel patented by Richard Mansell, the Carriage and Wagon superintendent of the South Eastern Railway in the UK. The design was created in the 1840s and was eventually used widely on passenger railway stock in the UK. It is an interesting example of a composite wooden wheel, using the same principle as an artillery wheel but with a solid wooden centre instead of spokes. The drawing (right) is from a railway design book of the early 20th century.

== Overview ==
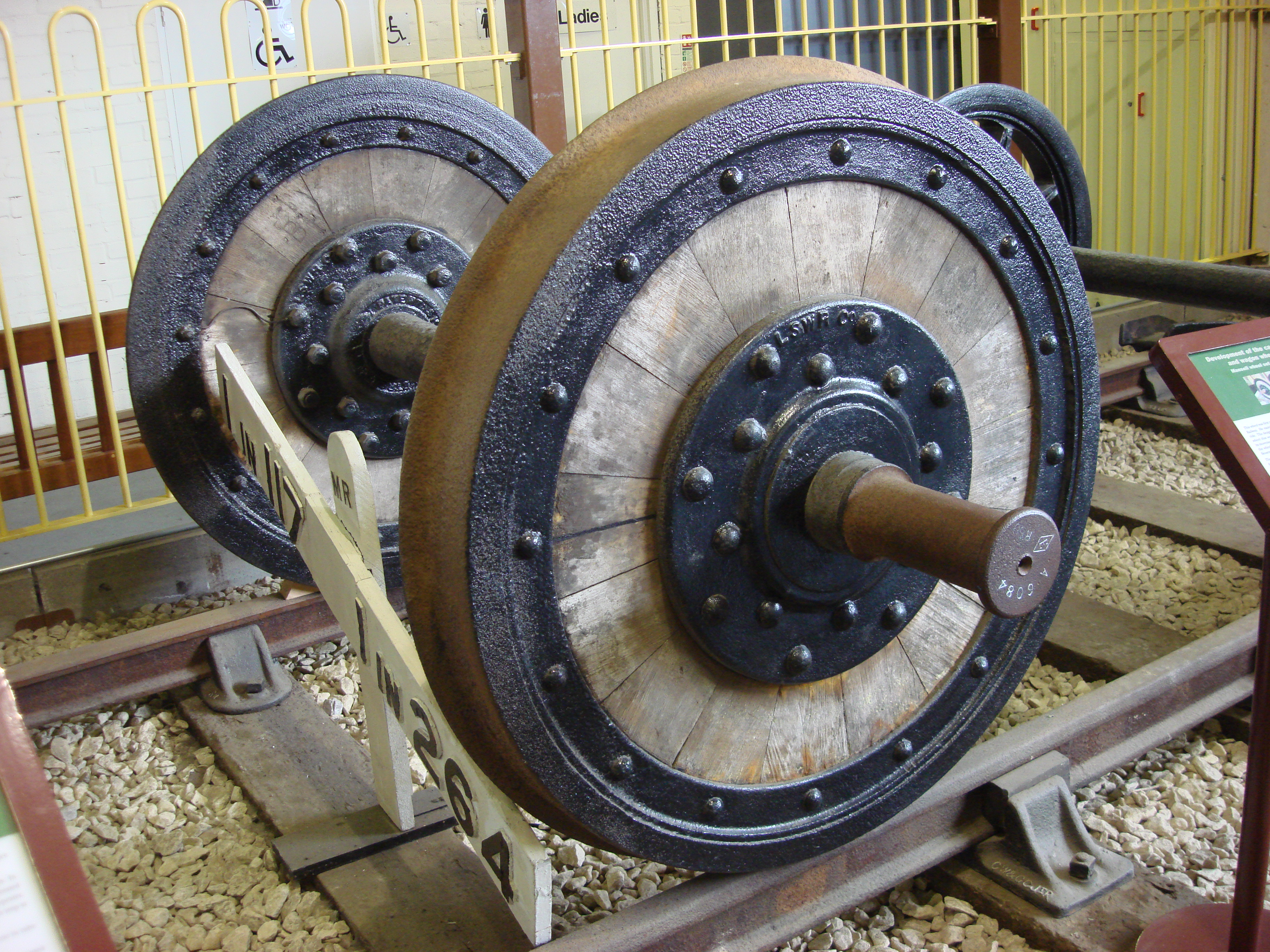
A preserved Mansell wheel set at the Buckinghamshire Railway Centre

The reason for using wood was to reduce the noise. Having a wooden centre eliminated the ringing noise that emanated from early railway wheels. Made from teak, this type of wheel endured for a long time. Besides the reduction in noise, there was an increased safety factor. While some of that might be attributed to the extra attention paid to what were specifically passenger carriage wheels, the potential for casting faults was also reduced.

The wooden centres acted as electrical insulators, so Mansell wheels would not operate the track circuits used in railway signalling. That problem was solved by fitting copper bonding to the wheels.

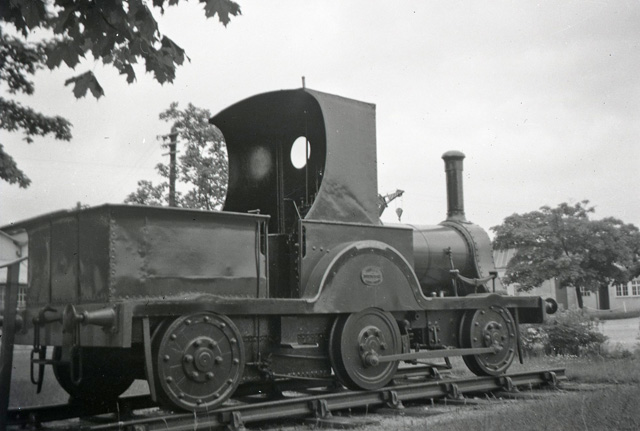
Gazelle

Mansell wheels were used almost exclusively on passenger coaches, but there are some examples of their use on a locomotive. The Shropshire and Montgomeryshire Railway's 0-4-2WT locomotive "Gazelle" has trailing wheels of the Mansell type. "Gazelle" is preserved at the Colonel Stephens Railway Museum.

The first examples of the GWR 4-4-0 Duke class of 1895 also used Mansell wheels for their bogie and tender. Another tank locomotive 0-4-4T class bogie used Mansel (sic) wheels.

== Re-use of wooden segments ==
The wooden segments of the wheel had a shorter life than other parts, and were replaced at intervals, usually because they had become loose in the wheel rim, not because the timber was otherwise damaged. The valuable teak was often re-used. As the segments were too short for most woodworking uses, they were typically re-used as wooden flooring blocks.

The blocks were common for outdoor use at railway stations, particularly around milk loading docks and on platforms that handled postal traffic. Those platforms were regularly in use overnight and the wooden blocks provided a quieter surface, which made for less disturbance for the station's neighbours than cobblestones, even with iron-tyred carts running over them. An example of a wood block pavement made from wheel segments survives at Liverpool's Edge Hill.

== See also ==
- Paper car wheel, a US design using a compressed paper inner
