= Pullman Company =

American railroad-car manufacturer

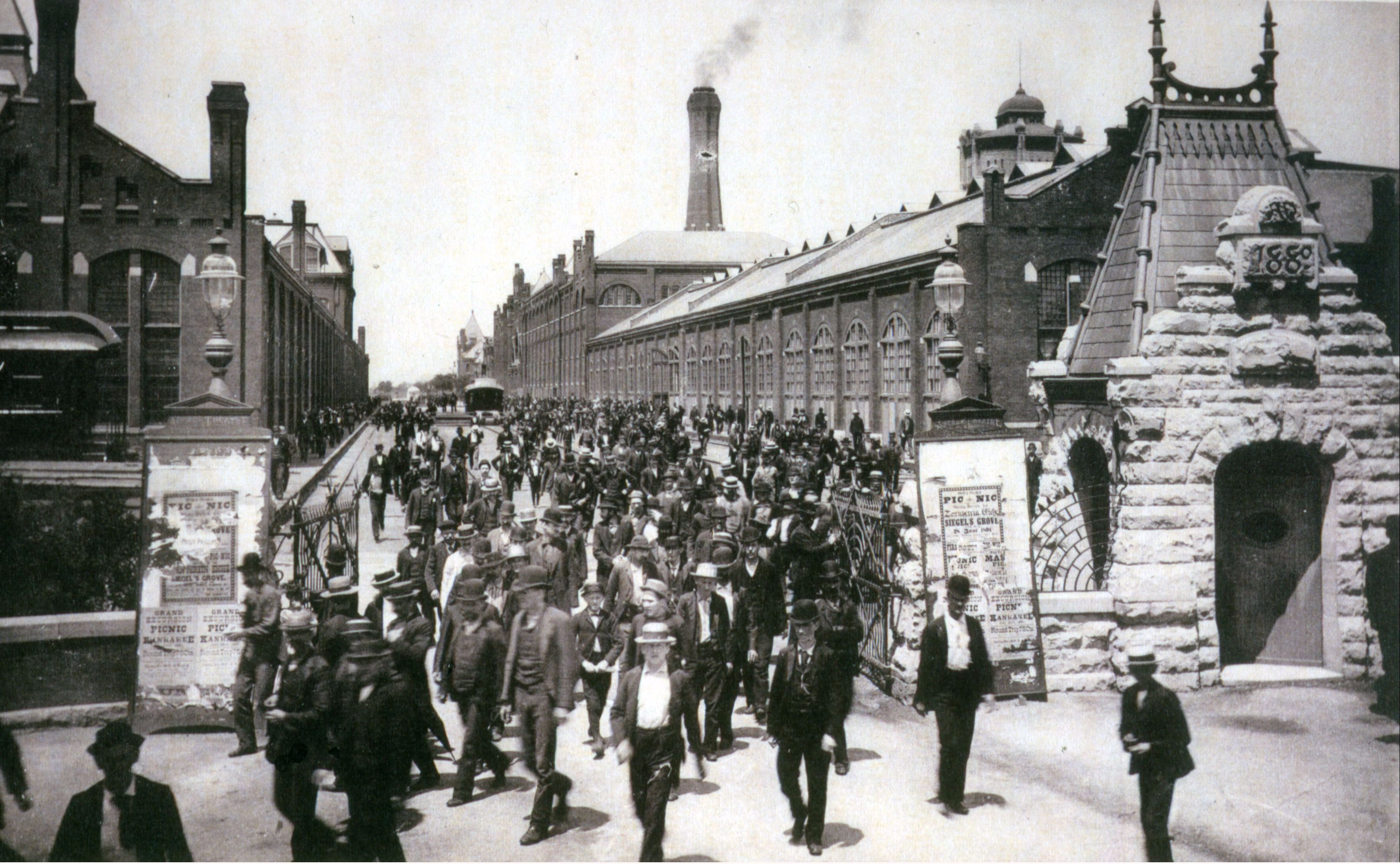
- Workers leave the Pullman Palace Car Works, 1893
- Formerly: Pullman Palace Car Co. (1867–1900); The Pullman Co. (1900–1927)
- Industry: Rail transport
- Founded: 1862; 164 years ago Chicago, Illinois
- Founder: George Pullman
- Defunct: December 31, 1968
- Fate: Dissolved; successor Pullman Technology sold to Bombardier Transportation (1987)
- Successor: Pullman, Inc.; Pullman Technology, Inc.
- Headquarters: Chicago, Illinois, U.S.
- Area served: United States
- Key people: Robert Todd Lincoln (president)
- Products: Railroad cars Sleeping cars Streetcars; Trolleybuses; Rapid transit cars Commuter rail cars

The Pullman Company, founded by George Pullman, was a manufacturer of railroad cars in the mid-to-late 19th century through the first half of the 20th century, during the boom of railroads in the United States. Through rapid late-19th century development of mass production and takeover of rivals, the company developed a virtual monopoly on production and ownership of sleeping cars.

At the company's peak in the early 20th century, its cars accommodated 26 million people a year, and it in effect operated "the largest hotel in the world". Its production workers initially lived in a planned worker community, known as a company town, named Pullman, Chicago.

In response to a downturn in business as a result of the Panic of 1893, the Pullman Company cut wages by 25% without reducing rents on company-mandated housing. This resulted in the Pullman Strike, one of the most consequential strikes in United States labor history.

Pullman developed the sleeping car, which carried his name into the 1980s. Pullman did not just manufacture the cars, it also operated them on most of the railroads in the United States, paying railroad companies to couple the cars to trains. In return, by the mid-20th century, these railroads would own Pullman outright. A labor union associated with the company, the Brotherhood of Sleeping Car Porters, founded and organized by A. Philip Randolph, was one of the most powerful African-American political entities of the 20th century. The company also built thousands of streetcars and trolley buses for use in cities. Post-WWII changes in automobile and airplane transport led to a steep decline in the company's fortunes. It collapsed in 1968, with a successor company continuing operations until 1981.

== History ==
After spending the night sleeping in his seat on a train trip from Buffalo to Westfield, New York, George Pullman was inspired to design an improved passenger railcar which contained sleeper berths for all its passengers. During the day, the upper berth was folded up overhead similar to a present-day airliner's overhead luggage compartment. At night, the upper berth folded down and the two facing seats below it folded over to provide a relatively comfortable lower berth. Although this was a somewhat spartan accommodation by today's standards, it was a great improvement on the previous layout. Curtains provided privacy, and there were washrooms at each end of the car for men and women. The first Pullman coach was built at the Chicago & Alton shops in Bloomington, Illinois in the spring of 1859 with the permission of Chicago & Alton President Joel A. Matteson.

Pullman established his company in 1862 and built luxury sleeping cars which featured carpeting, draperies, upholstered chairs, libraries, card tables and an unparalleled level of customer service. Patented paper car wheels provided a quieter and smoother ride than conventional cast iron wheels from 1867 to 1915.

In 1889, Pullman partnered with William H. Patton who had developed a locomotive powered by a gasoline engine. The partnership developed the first gasoline-electric locomotive in the world and sold them under the Patton Motors name until the start of World War One.

Once a household name due to their large market share, the Pullman Company is also known for the bitter Pullman Strike staged by their workers and union leaders in 1894. During an economic downturn, Pullman reduced hours and wages but not rents, precipitating the strike. Workers joined the American Railway Union, led by Eugene V. Debs.

After George Pullman's death in 1897, Robert Todd Lincoln, son of Abraham Lincoln, became the company's president.

In 1922, Haskell & Barker Car Manufacturing was acquired and in 1924 was merged with the other car manufacturing units of Pullman, and a new company was formed, Pullman Car & Manufacturing Company. In 1927, Pullman Company was created as a separate company and Pullman Incorporated was established as a holding company. In 1930, Pullman purchased the Standard Steel Car Company conglomerate which included Osgood Bradley, Standard Motor Truck, and Siems-Stembel. In 1934, it was merged with Pullman Car & Manufacturing Company to be known as Pullman-Standard Car Manufacturing Company.

The company closed its factory in the Pullman neighborhood of Chicago in 1955. The company ceased production after the Amtrak Superliner cars in 1982 and its remaining designs were purchased in 1987 when it was absorbed by Bombardier.

== Gallery of Pullman railroad cars ==
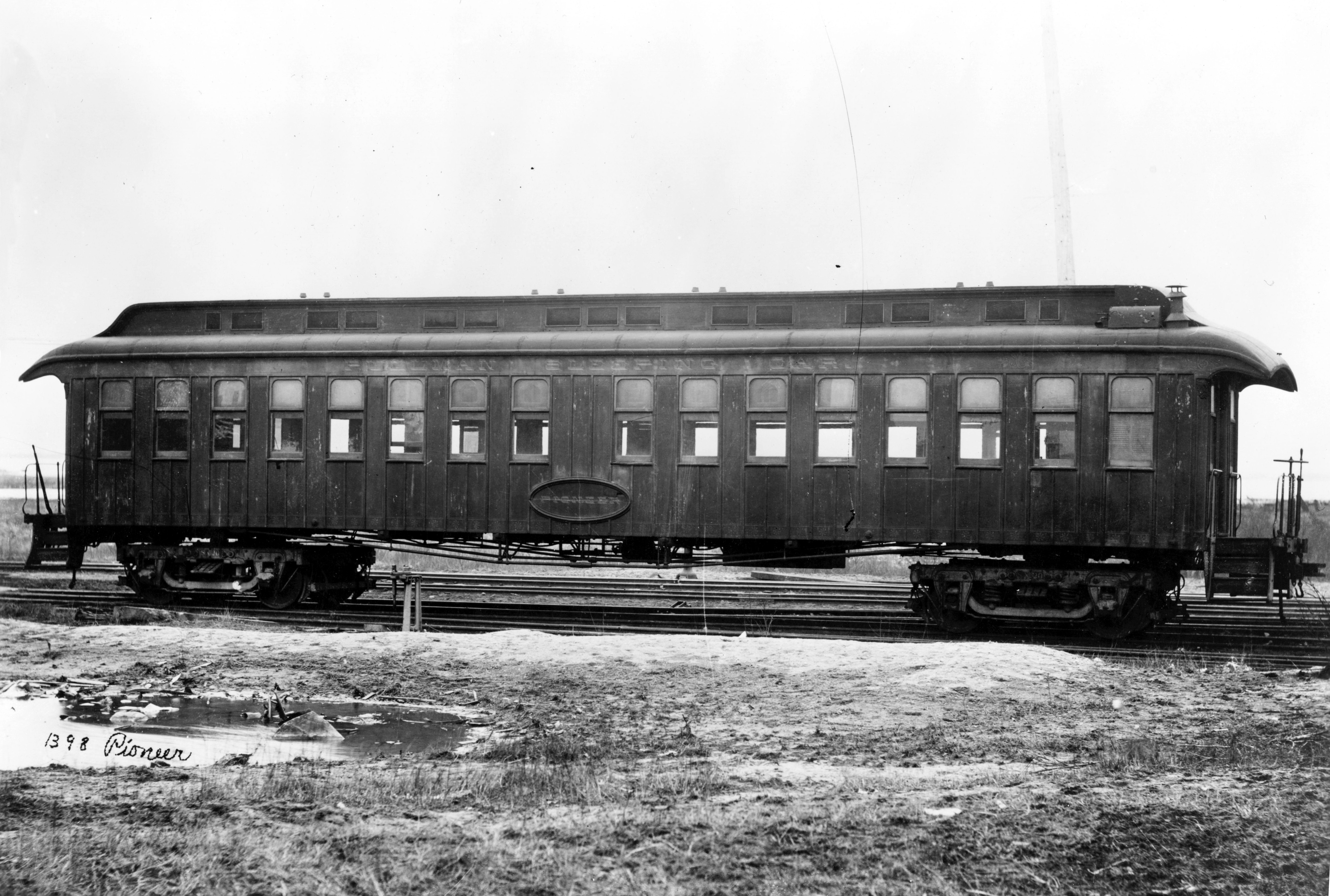
Exterior view of a Pullman car

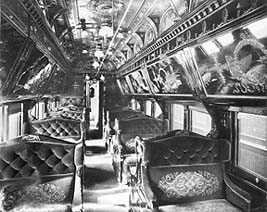
Interior view of a Pullman car

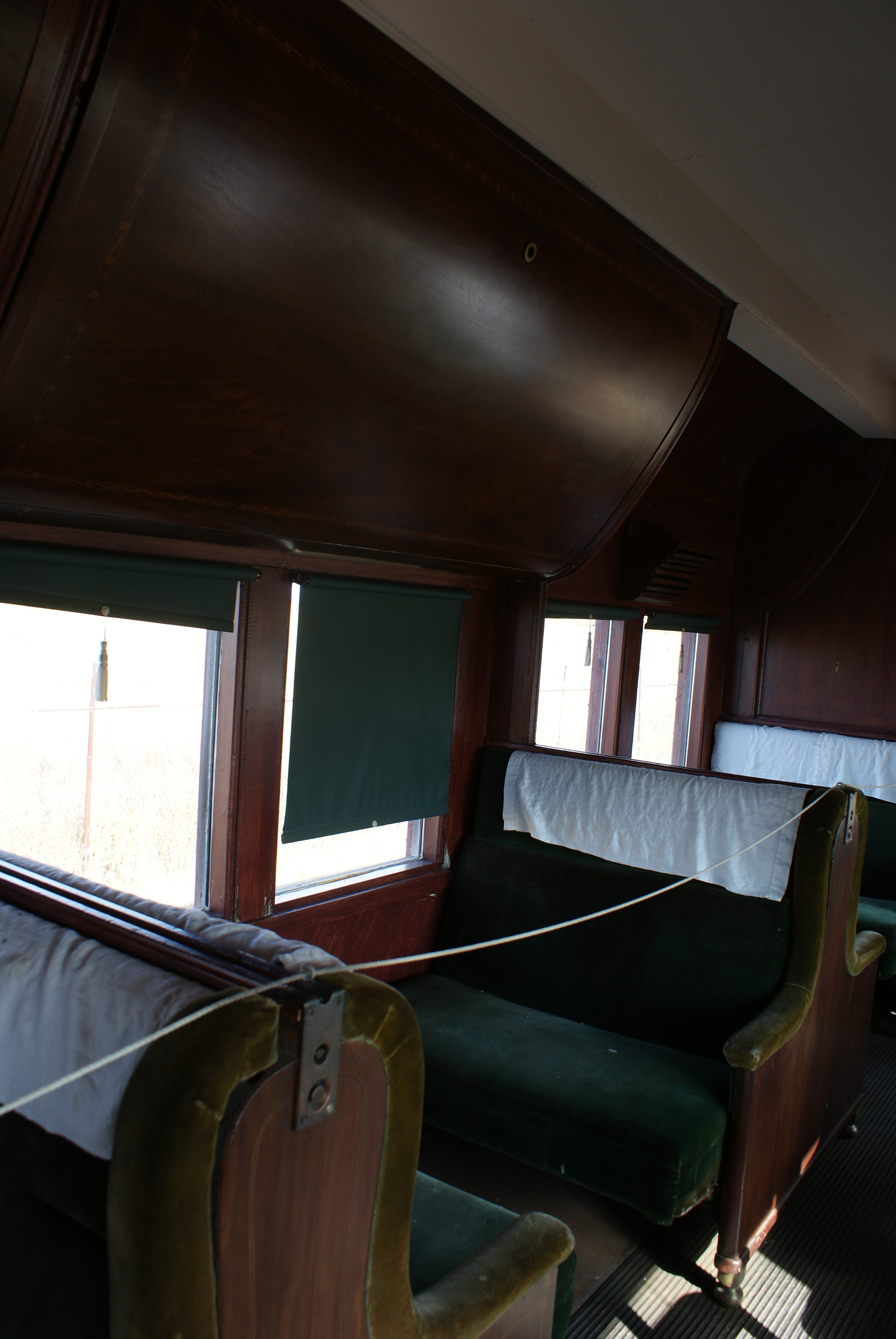
Upper and lower berth

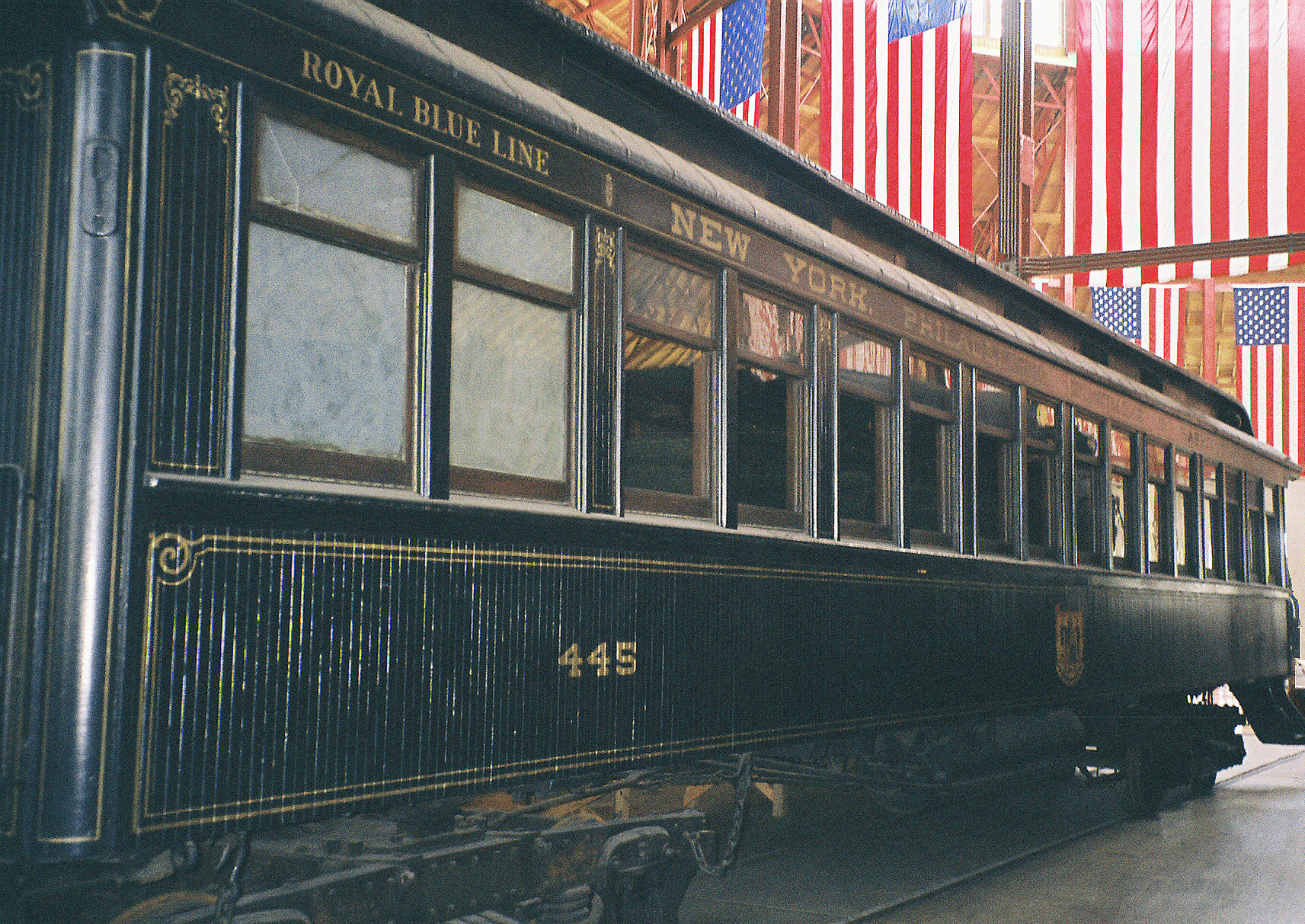
Coach built in 1890 by Pullman for the B&O Royal Blue, now at the National Museum of Railroad History & Innovation in Baltimore, Maryland

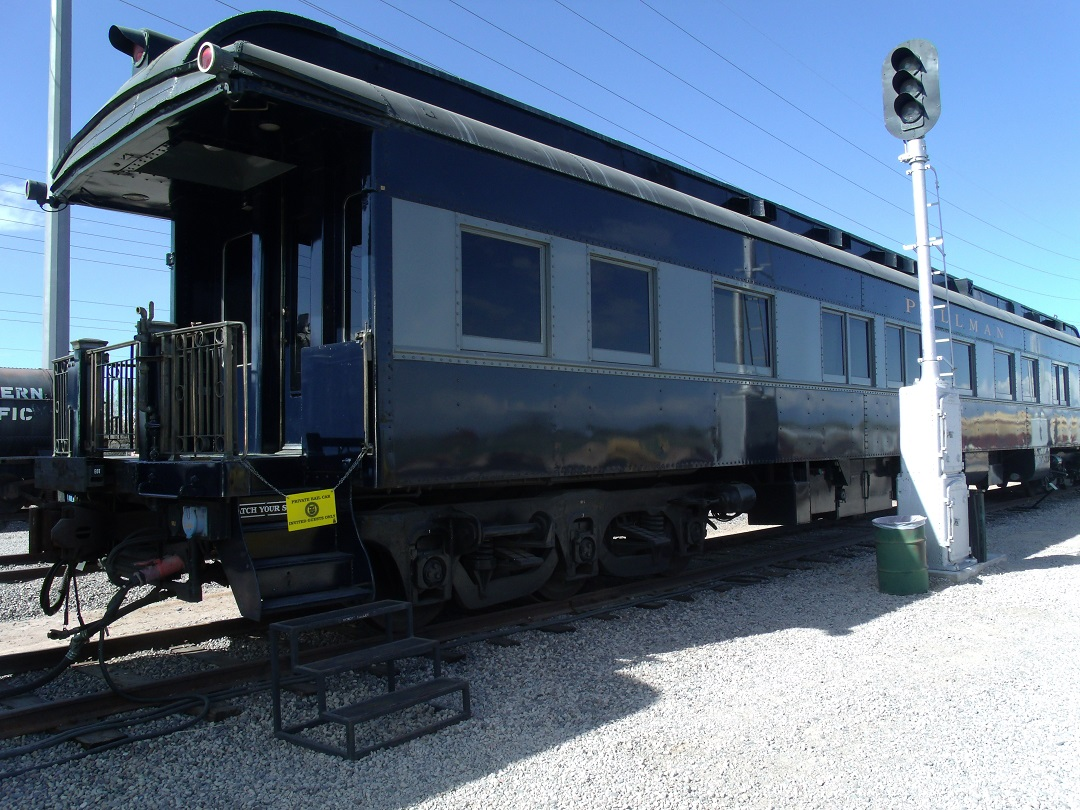
The Federal #98 Pullman Private Car. This Pullman Private Car, which was available for lease, was built by the Pullman Company in 1911

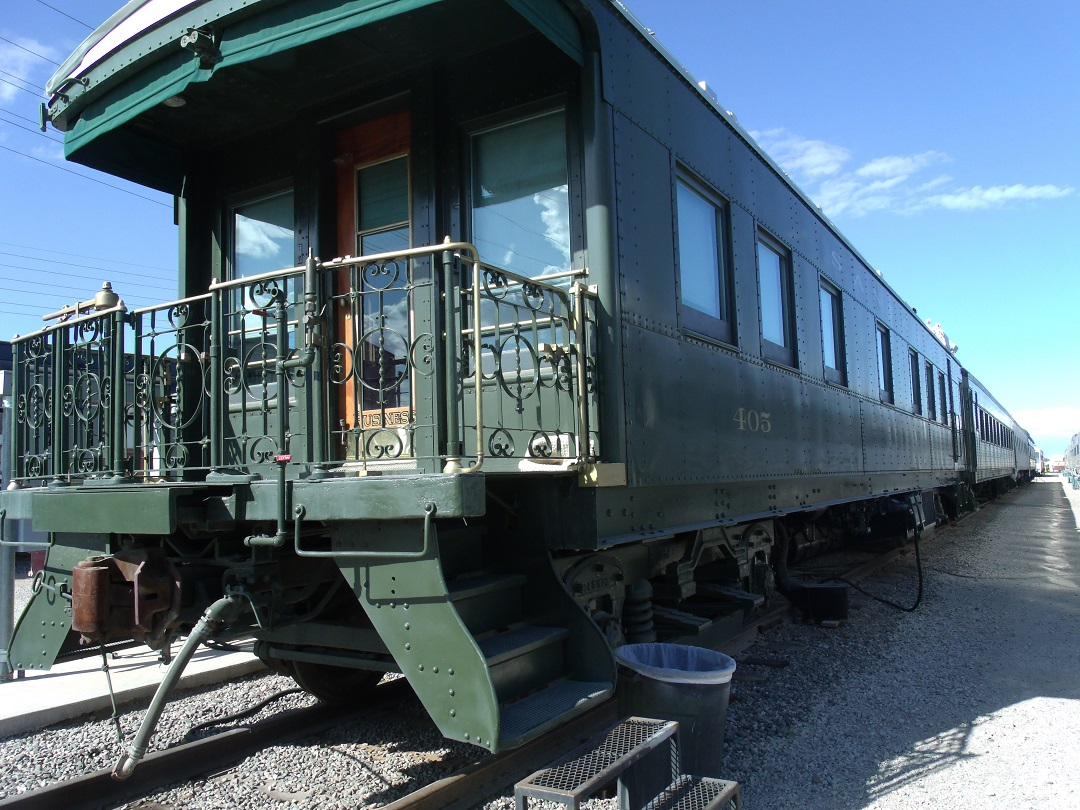
The Santa Fe Business Car #405, also known as the Superintendent's Car, was one of eighteen cars built in 1927 by the Pullman Company as part of the fourth order of business cars for division superintendents

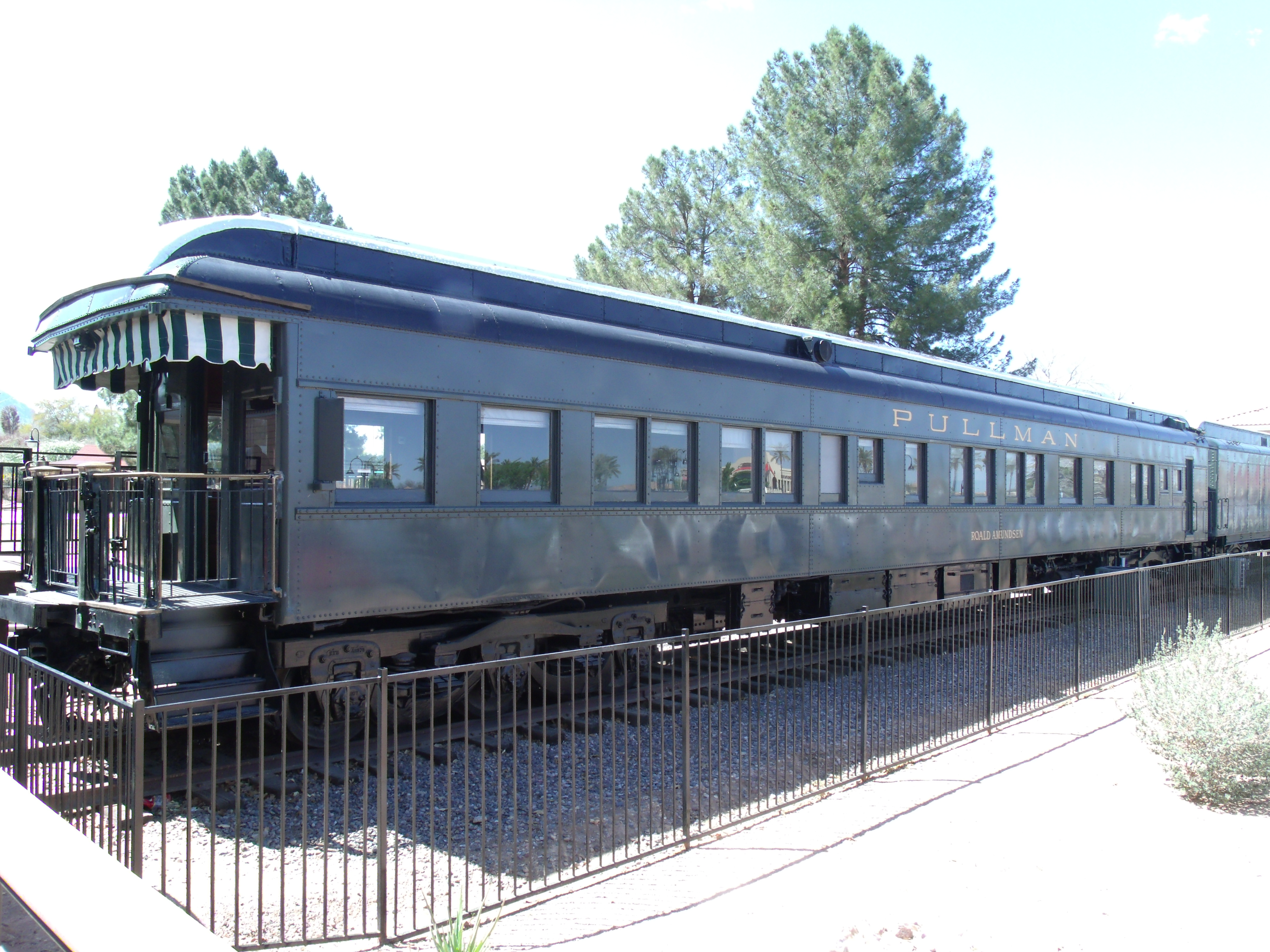
Built in 1928, the 'Amundsen', on different occasions reportedly carried Presidents Herbert Hoover, Franklin D. Roosevelt, Harry S. Truman and Dwight D. Eisenhower

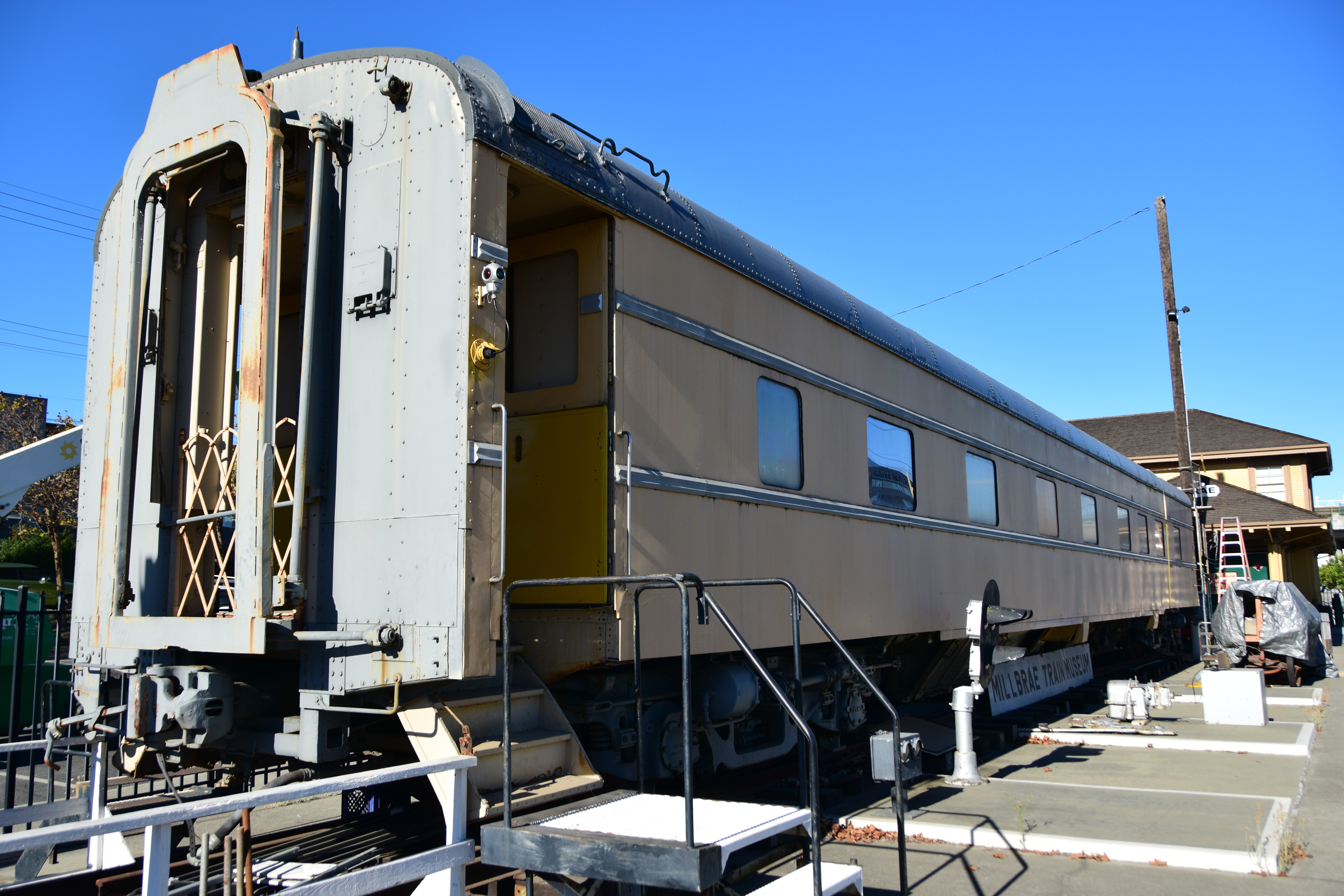
The 'Civic Center' was built in the 1940s and ran in the City of San Francisco and now resides at the Millbrae Train Museum

== Corporate history ==
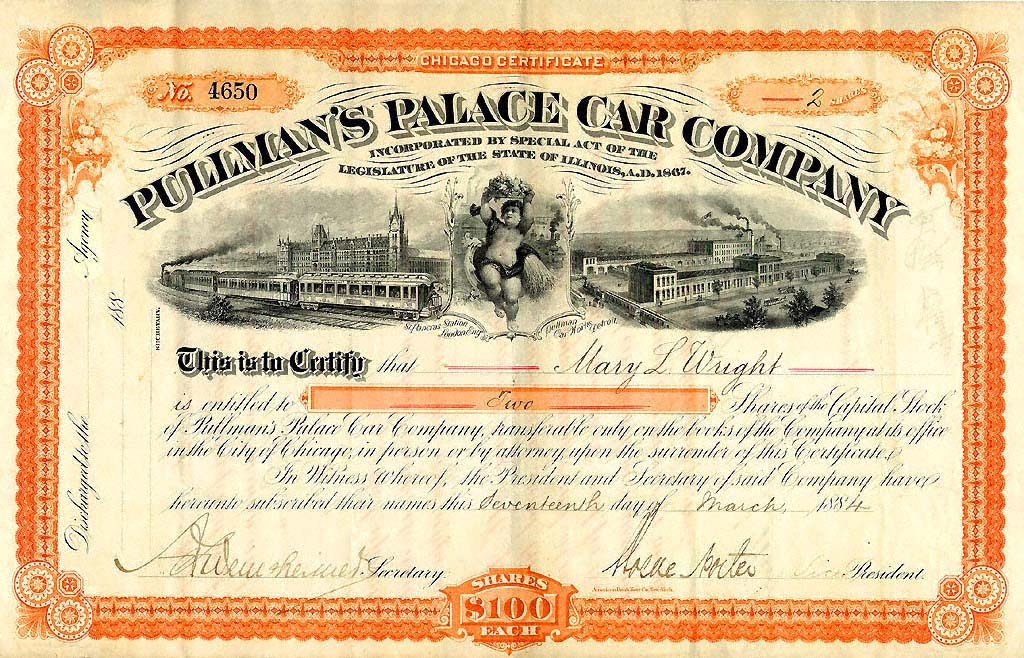
Pullman's Palace Car Co. capital stock certificate (1884)

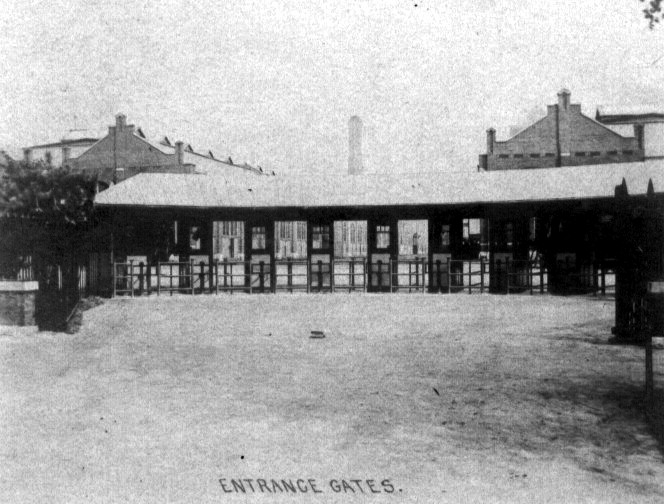
Entrance gates to the company's Calumet Works, circa 1900

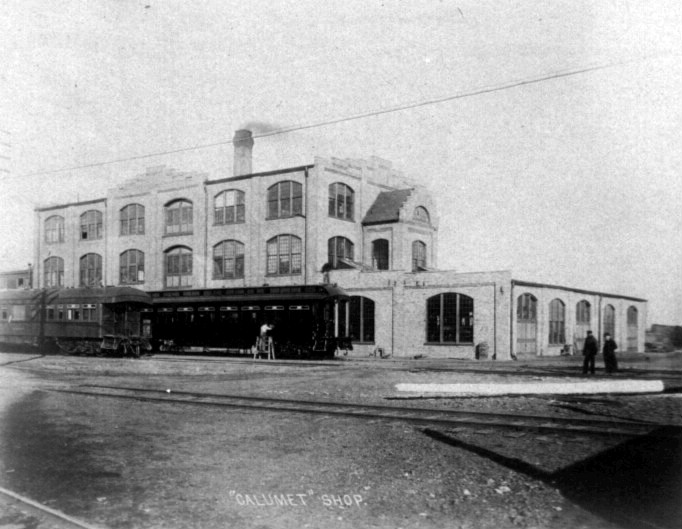
The Calumet Works, circa 1900

Robert Todd Lincoln, who served as company president

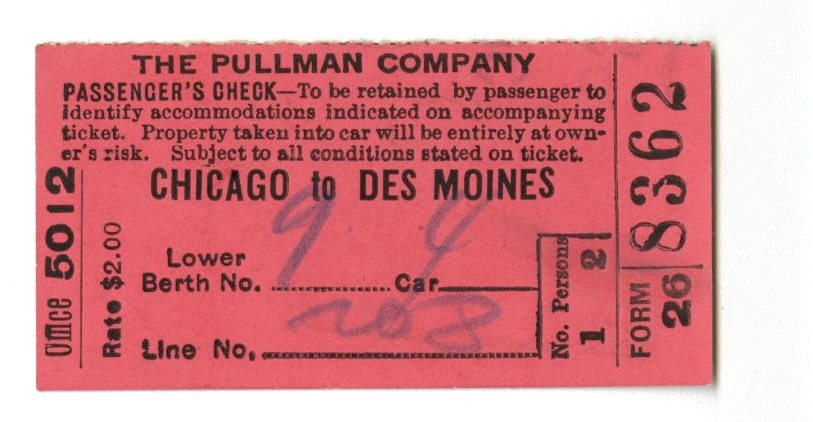
The Pullman Company ticket from Chicago to Des Moines

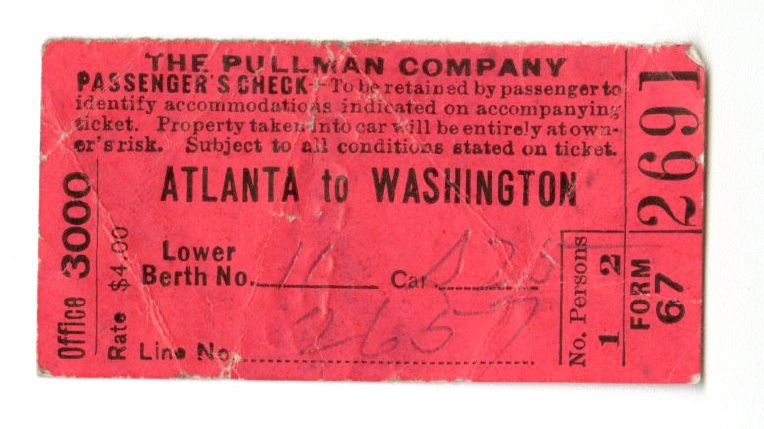
The Pullman Company ticket from Atlanta to Washington

The original Pullman Palace Car Co. had been organized on February 22, 1867.

On January 1, 1900, after buying numerous associated and competing companies, it was reorganized as The Pullman Co., characterized by its trademark phrase, "Travel and Sleep in Safety and Comfort."

In 1924, the Pullman Car & Manufacturing Corporation was organized from the previous Pullman manufacturing department and recently acquired Haskell & Barker Car Company, to consolidate the car building interests of The Pullman Co. The parent company, The Pullman Co. was established as its own company and Pullman, Inc., was formed on June 21, 1927.

The best years for Pullman were the mid-1920s. In 1925, the fleet grew to 9800 cars. Twenty-eight thousand conductors and twelve thousand porters were employed by the Pullman Co. Pullman built its last standard heavyweight sleeping car in February 1931.

Pullman purchased controlling interest in Standard Steel Car Company in 1929, and on December 26, 1934, Pullman Car & Manufacturing, along with several other Pullman, Inc. subsidiaries, merged with Standard Steel Car Co. and its subsidiaries to form the Pullman-Standard Car Manufacturing Company. Pullman-Standard remained in the rail car manufacturing business until 1982. Standard Steel Car Co., had been organized on January 2, 1902, to operate a railroad car manufacturing facility at Butler, Pennsylvania, and, after 1906, a facility at Hammond, Indiana, was reorganized as a subsidiary of Pullman, Inc., on March 1, 1930.

In 1940, just as orders for lightweight cars were increasing and sleeping car traffic was growing, the United States Department of Justice filed an anti-trust complaint against Pullman Incorporated in the U.S. District Court at Philadelphia (Civil Action No. 994). The federal government sought to separate the company's sleeping car operations from its manufacturing activities. In 1944, the court concurred, ordering Pullman Incorporated to divest itself of either the Pullman Company (operating) or the Pullman-Standard Car Manufacturing Company (manufacturing). After three years of negotiations, the Pullman Company was sold to a consortium of 57 railroads for approximately US$40 million, equal to $634,426,230 today.

In 1943, Pullman Standard established a shipbuilding division and entered wartime small ship design and construction. The yard was located near Lake Calumet in Chicago, on the north side of 130th Street. Pullman built the boats in 40-ton blocks which were assembled in a fabrication shop on 111th Street and moved to the yard on gondola cars. In two years, the company built 34 Corvette Patrol Craft, Escorts (PCEs), which were 180 feet long and weighed 640 tons, and 44 Landing Ship, Medium (LSMs), which were 203 feet long and weighed 520 tons. Pullman ranked 56th among United States corporations in the value of World War II military production contracts.

Pullman-Standard built its last sleeping car in 1956 and its last lightweight passenger cars in 1965, an order of ten coaches for Kansas City Southern. The company continued to market and build cars for commuter rail and subway service and Superliners for Amtrak as late as the late 1970s and early 1980s.

Beginning in 1975, Pullman started delivery of the massive 754 75 ft (23 m) stainless steel subway cars to the New York City Transit Authority. Designated R46 by their procurement contract, these cars, along with the R44 subway car built by St. Louis Car Company, were designed for 70 mph (110 km/h) speeds in the Second Avenue Subway. After it was deferred in 1975, the Transit Authority assigned the cars to other subway services. Pullman also built subway cars for the Massachusetts Bay Transportation Authority, which assigned them to the Red Line. Pullman-Standard was spun off from Pullman, Inc., as Pullman Technology, Inc., in 1981, and was sold to Bombardier in 1987.

=== Pullman antitrust case ===
In United States v. Pullman Co., 50 F. Supp. 123, 126, 137 (E.D. Pa. 1943), the company was ordered to divest itself of one of its two lines of sleeping car businesses after having acquired all of its competitors.

=== The end of Pullman ===
After the 1944 breakup, Pullman, Inc., remained in place as the parent company, with the following subsidiaries: The Pullman Company for passenger car operations (but not passenger car ownership, which was passed to member railroads), and Pullman-Standard Car Manufacturing Co., for passenger car and freight car manufacturing; along with a large freight car leasing operation under the parent company's control. Pullman, Inc., remained separate until a merger with Wheelabrator, then headed by CEO Michael D. Dingman, in late 1980, which led to the separation of Pullman interests in early and mid-1981.

Operations of the Pullman Company sleeper cars ceased and all leases were terminated on December 31, 1968. On January 1, 1969, the Pullman Company was dissolved and all assets were liquidated. (The most visible result on many railroads, including Union Pacific, was that the Pullman name was removed from the letterboard of all Pullman-owned cars.) An auction of all Pullman remaining assets was held at the Pullman plant in Chicago in early 1970. The Pullman, Inc., company remained in place until 1981 or 1982 to close out all remaining liabilities and claims, operating from an office in Denver.

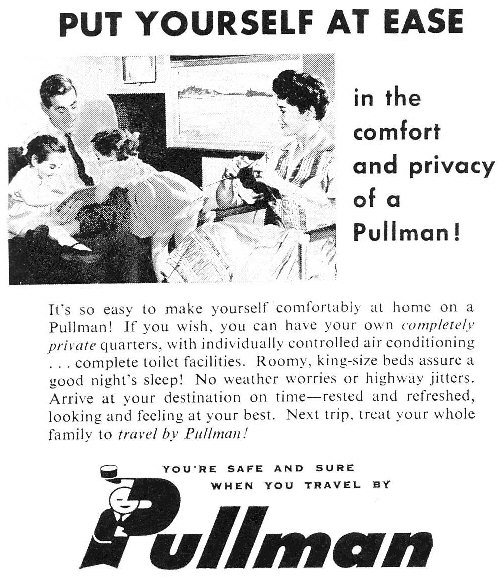
Pullman advertisement in 1962 Seaboard Air Line Railroad time table

The passenger car designs of Pullman-Standard were spun off into a separate company called Pullman Technology, Inc., in 1982. Using the Transit America trade name, Pullman Technology continued to market its Comet car design (first built for New Jersey Department of Transportation in 1970) for commuter operations until 1987, when Bombardier purchased Pullman Technology to gain control of its designs and patents. As of late 2004, Pullman Technology, Inc., remained a subsidiary of Bombardier.

Pullman, Inc., spun off its large fleet of leased freight rail cars in April 1981 as Pullman Leasing Company, which later became part of ITEL Leasing, retaining the original PLCX reporting mark. ITEL Rail Leasing (including the PLCX reporting mark) was later divested to GE Rail Services.

In mid-1981, Pullman, Inc., spun off its freight car manufacturing interests as Pullman Transportation Company. Several plants were closed and in 1984, the remaining railcar manufacturing plants and the Pullman-Standard freight car designs and patents were sold to Trinity Industries.

After separating itself from its rail car manufacturing interests, Pullman, Inc., continued as a diversified corporation, with later mergers and acquisitions, including a merger in late 1980 with Wheelabrator-Frye, Inc., in which Pullman became a subsidiary of Wheelabrator-Frye, Inc. In January 1982, Wheelabrator-Frye merged with M. W. Kellogg Company, a builder of large, cast-in-place smokestacks, silos and chimneys. Wheelabrator-Frye retained both Pullman and Kellogg as direct subsidiaries. Later in 1982 Signal acquired Wheelabrator-Frye. In 1990, the entire Wheelabrator-Frye group was sold to Waste Management, Inc. The Pullman-Kellogg interests were spun off by Waste Management as Pullman Power Products Corporation, and by late 2004 that company was doing business as Pullman Power LLC, a subsidiary of Structural Group, a specialty contractor.

As a side note, other construction engineering portions of Pullman-Kellogg were spun off as a new M. W. Kellogg Corporation, and in December 1998, became part of the merger that formed Kellogg, Brown & Root, a specialty contractor which itself was later sold to Halliburton, an oil well servicing company. In an eventual competitive move, other Kellogg engineering interests were merged with Rust Engineering becoming Kellogg Rust, which itself became The Henley Group, and later Rust International before it became the Rust Division of what later became Washington Group International, a specialty contracting firm that competes directly with Halliburton worldwide. Washington Group International (which was later acquired by URS Corporation, and is now part of AECOM) was the successor to the Morrison–Knudsen civil engineering and contracting corporation, and was also the owner of Montana Rail Link until the latter was acquired by the BNSF Railway.

After the last of the Kellogg interests of Pullman-Kellogg were spun off, and after the railcar manufacturing plants were sold, and with the formal dissolution of the old Pullman Company (the operating company from the 1944 split), the remaining portions of the Pullman interests were spun off in May 1985 by Signal into a new Pullman Company. In November 1985, Pullman bought Peabody International and the new company took the new name of Pullman Peabody. In April 1987 (after Pullman Technology was sold to Bombardier), the name was changed back to Pullman Company. In July 1987 the company acquired Clevite Industries. By 1996, Pullman Co., with its Clevite subsidiary, was almost solely a supplier of automotive elastomer (rubber) parts, and in July 1996 the company was sold to Tenneco. As of late 2004, Pullman Co. (now the brand name Clevite), as a manufacturer of automotive elastomer products, was still under the control of Tenneco Automotive.

== Company town ==
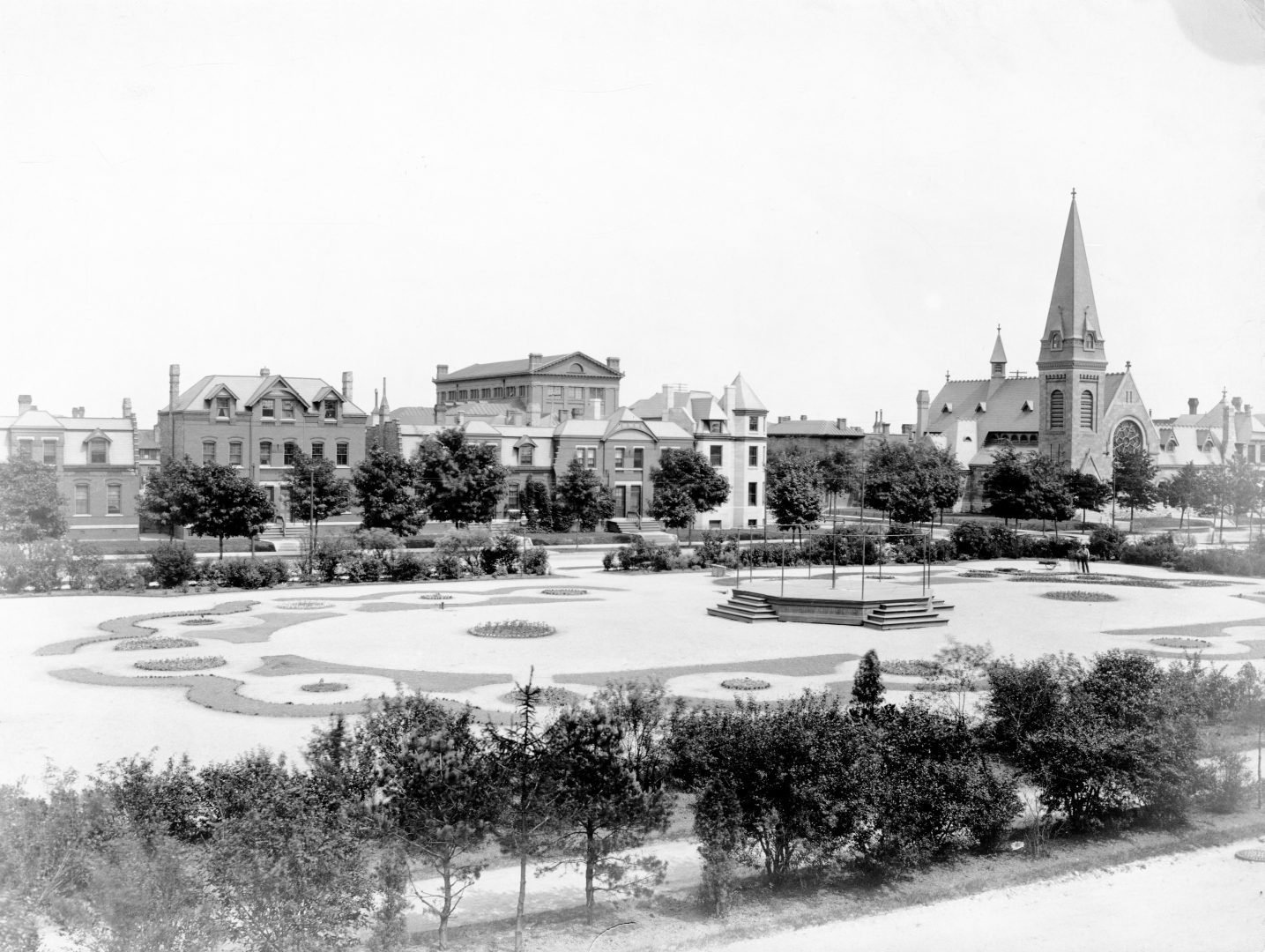
Pullman, Illinois

In 1877, the United States experienced the Great Railroad Strike. Part of its legacy included more powerful unions and a tendency for employers to consider the broader well-being of their employees. Pullman's objective in building a company town was to attract a superior type of employee and further elevate these individuals by excluding baneful influences. In late April 1880, George Pullman announced his plans to build a company town and factory. Pullman's plan included an expectation that rent collected on the houses in the town would produce a 6% return on investment (ROI), but the ROI never exceeded 4–4 1/2%.

The company built Pullman, Illinois on 4,000 acres (1,600 ha), 14 mi (23 km) south of Chicago, contracting Solon Spencer Beman for design and Nathan F. Barrett for landscaping. Both were considered experts in their respective fields. Beman interned under architect Richard Upjohn. Barrett landscaped areas in Staten Island and Tuxedo, New York, as well as Long Branch, New Jersey. George Pullman's governing concept placed the town not within the city limits of Chicago but in the adjoining town of Hyde Park. On April 24, 1880, groundwork began. Throughout construction, Pullman sought to minimize costs and maximize efficiency adopting techniques of mass production whenever possible. Some of the earliest departments and shops created included painting, iron, and woodworking. These could then be employed to contribute to continuing construction. By January 1, 1881, the town was ready for its first resident. A foreman from the Pullman Company's Detroit shop, Lee Benson, moved his wife, child, and sister into the town.

Building exteriors were red brick with limestone trim. Interiors featured high ceilings and large windows. Interior walls were purposefully painted in light colors to provide a cheerful environment. When completed, the town included a library, theater, hotel, church, market, sewage farm, park, and many residential buildings. The bar in the Florence Hotel was the only place within the town limits where alcohol could be served and consumed. In the residential section, 150 acres (61 ha) were dedicated to tenements, flats and single-family homes with rents from $0.50 to $0.75 per month. (Note: $17 to $25 in 2025 adjusted for inflation) The residences featured modern conveniences such as gas, running water, indoor sewage plumbing and regular garbage removal. By 1884, there were more than 1,400 tenements and flats. By July of the following year, the population exceeded 8,600.

In charge of the company town was the town agent who was responsible for all services and businesses including street and building maintenance, gas and water works, fire protection, the hotel, sewage farm, and the nursery and greenhouse. Reporting to the town agent were nine department heads and approximately 300 men. There were no elections except for the school board, as all officials were selected by Pullman.

After its completion, the Pullman company town attracted national attention. Many critics praised Pullman's concept and planning. One newspaper article titled "The Arcadian City: Pullman, the Ideal City of the World" praised the town as "the youngest and most perfect city in the world, Pullman; beautiful in every belonging." In February 1885, Harper's Monthly published and article by Richard T. Ely entitled "Pullman: A Social Study". Though the article offered praise for creating an elevated environment for its workers, it criticized the all-encompassing influence of the company ultimately concluding that "Pullman is un-American" and "benevolent, well-wishing feudalism."

During the Panic of 1893, Pullman closed his manufacturing plant in Detroit to move all manufacturing to Pullman. Due to the soft economic conditions of this period, the Pullman Co. reduced wages and laid off employees. Though wages were reduced, residential utility rates and rents remained unchanged. On May 11, 1894, the employees of the Pullman Co. walked off the job initiating the Pullman Strike. Thirty people were killed as a result of the strikes and sabotage. The loss of pride after the strike stayed with the town long afterward.

In February 1904, the Pullman Company was given a court order to sell the company town but delayed compliance until 1907. Today, Pullman is a Chicago neighborhood, and a historical landmark district on the state, National Historic Landmark and National Register of Historic Places lists.

In 2014, the National Park Service initially considered the concept of turning Pullman into a new, urban National Park. On February 19, 2015, Pullman's company town was established as a National Monument by President Barack Obama.

== Other Pullman sites ==
The Pullman Company operated several facilities in other areas of the US. One of these was the Pullman Shops in Richmond, California, which was linked to the mainline tracks of both the Southern Pacific and the Santa Fe, servicing their passenger equipment from throughout the Western US. The main building of the Richmond Pullman Shops still exists, as does the thoroughfare it is located on: Pullman Avenue. Another site was Pullman Car & Manufacturing Corp. of Bessemer, Alabama, incorporated on January 15, 1929.

== Porters ==
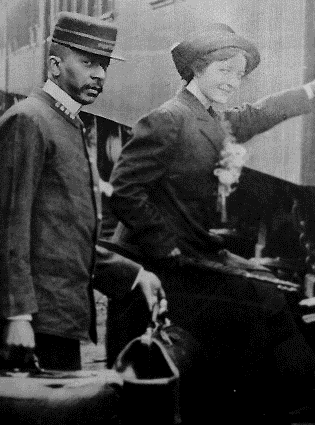
A Pullman porter assisting a passenger with her luggage

The Pullman Company was also noted for its porters. The porters served first-class passengers traveling in the luxurious Pullman sleeping cars.

When George Pullman began hiring porters in 1868, he sought people who had been trained to be the perfect servants. This led the company to hire black men (many, if not all, of whom were newly freed chattel slaves) almost exclusively for the porter positions. This decision by Pullman wasn't one of altruism but one primarily driven by economics: Pullman paid the black porters a pittance, forcing them to rely on tips from their white clientele for most of their earnings. This allowed the company to increase profits by minimizing the wages paid to one of its most important, and numerous, positions.

Being a Pullman Porter was seen as safe, steady work and allowed tens of thousands of African-Americans access to middle-class life. This had little to do with the wages being paid to them by Pullman, and more to do with the reliable income stream.

Former slaves working in a servile position were treated harshly, and were frequently subject to verbal and physical abuse. In 1925, after decades of discrimination and mistreatment by the passengers and the Pullman company itself, the porters organized and became the first African-American labor union. Founded by A. Philip Randolph the porters formed the Brotherhood of Sleeping Car Porters (BSCP), which after years of effort, fought for and won a collective bargaining agreement in 1937. At its height the Brotherhood of Sleeping Car Porters had a membership of over 18,000 passenger railway workers across Canada, Mexico, and the United States.

The legacy of Pullman porters goes beyond the railway. A. Philip Randolph took the lessons learned and experience gained in organizing the Brotherhood of Sleeping Car Porters to help organize the nascent black civil rights movement. Likewise, E.D. Nixon, a Pullman porter and leader of a local chapter of the Brotherhood of Sleeping Car Porters, worked with one of his employees to help start the 1955 Montgomery bus boycott in Alabama, using Rosa Parks' arrest as a catalyst and rallying cry to help organize it. Nixon, whose duties as a porter often saw him out of town for various lengths of time, had to enlist the help of a young, energetic black minister new to Montgomery to run the boycott in his absence: the Reverend Martin Luther King Jr.

== Products ==
=== Rail vehicles ===
| Model | Operator | Introduced | Withdrawn |
|---|---|---|---|
| Streetcars, including the Presidents' Conference Committee streetcar, "A" series | see note below | 1891 | 1951 |
| steel interurban cars | South Shore and South Bend Railroad | 1926–29 | |
| articulated rapid transit cars | Chicago Transit Authority 5001–5004 | 1947 | retired 1985 |
| Skytop Lounge sleeping cars | Milwaukee Road | 1948–49 | |
| 4400 "Washboard" EMUs | New York, New Haven and Hartford Railroad | 1954 | Inherited by Penn Central, then Metro-North, which retired them in 1983 |
| MP72/P72/T72/PT72 passenger stock | Long Island Rail Road | 1955 | retired 1999 |
| Gallery cab and coach cars (based on St. Louis Car 7600 series for C&NW in 1955) | Chicago and North Western Transportation Company | 1956, 1958–70 | |
| lightweight, all aluminum Train-X | New York Central (Xplorer) & New Haven (Dan'l Webster) | 1957 | 1970 |
| ACMU Cars | New York Central/Metro-North | 1962–65 | |
| Pullman-Standard 01400/01491 Bluebird cars | MBTA Red Line | 1963 | 1994 |
| MP75 | Long Island Rail Road | 1963 | converted to trailer coaches in the 1970s |
| rapid transit cars | Chicago Transit Authority 2001–2180 | 1964 | retired 1993 |
| "Airporter" cars | Cleveland GCRTA Red Line | 1967 | |
| 01500/01600 Silverbird cars | MBTA Red Line | 1969–70 | |
| Comet I commuter coach | NJ Transit | 1970 | |
| R6; R7 Subway car R7A | New York City Subway | 1936; 1937; 1938 | 1977 |
| R46 | New York City Subway | 1975–78 | In progress as of 2025 |
| CTC/BTC-1 coaches (based on NJDOT/NJT Comet I coaches) | MBTA Commuter Rail | 1978 | |
| Superliner | Amtrak | 1978–81 | |
| Gallery I-III series bi-level passenger cars | | | |

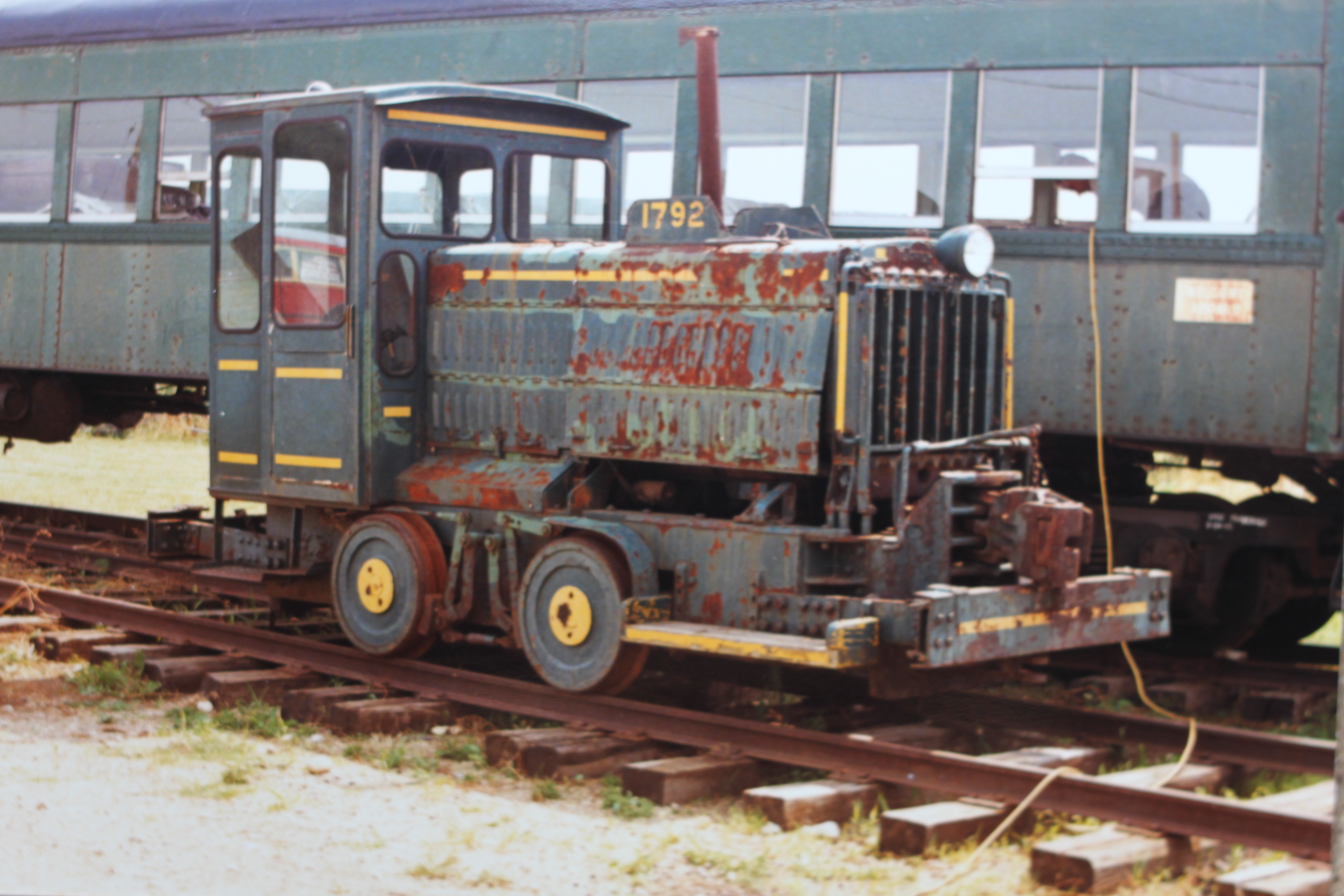
A 1792 (Davenport GE10) at Pullman Company in 1928

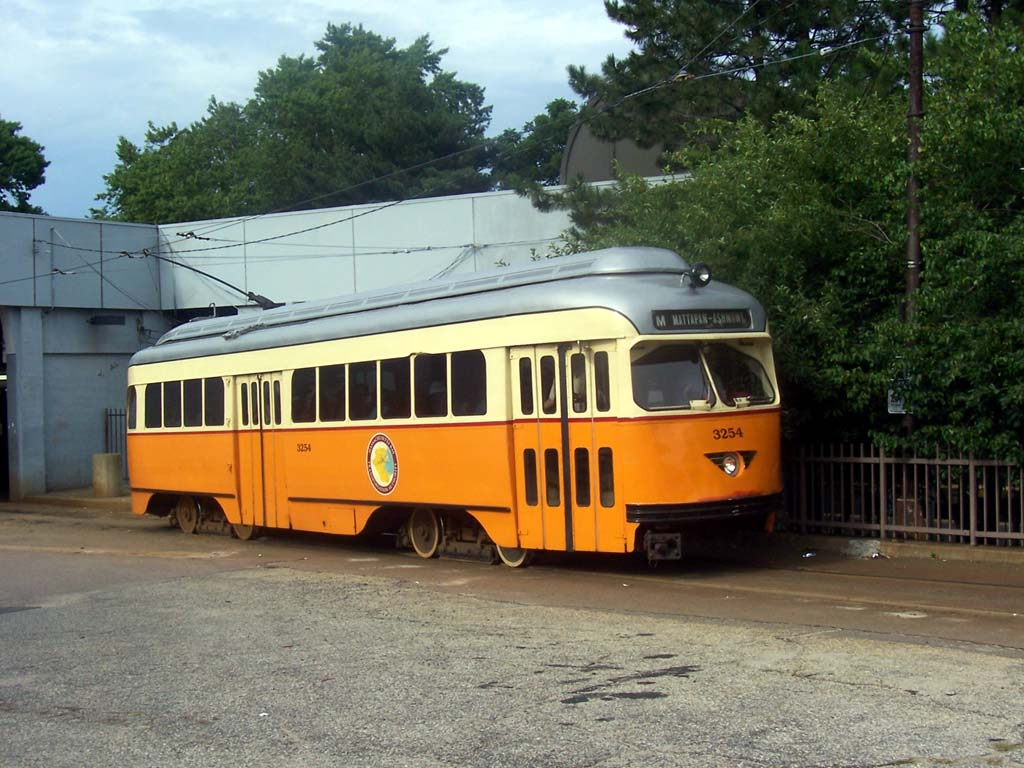
A 1946 PCC streetcar in Boston

Gallery cars

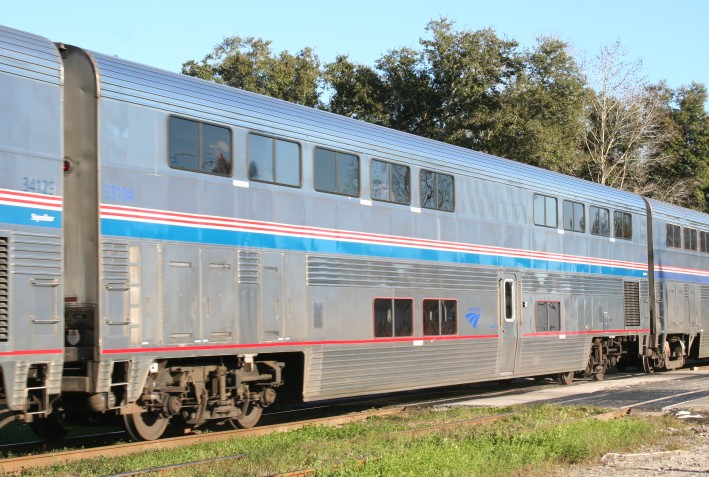
Superliner dining car

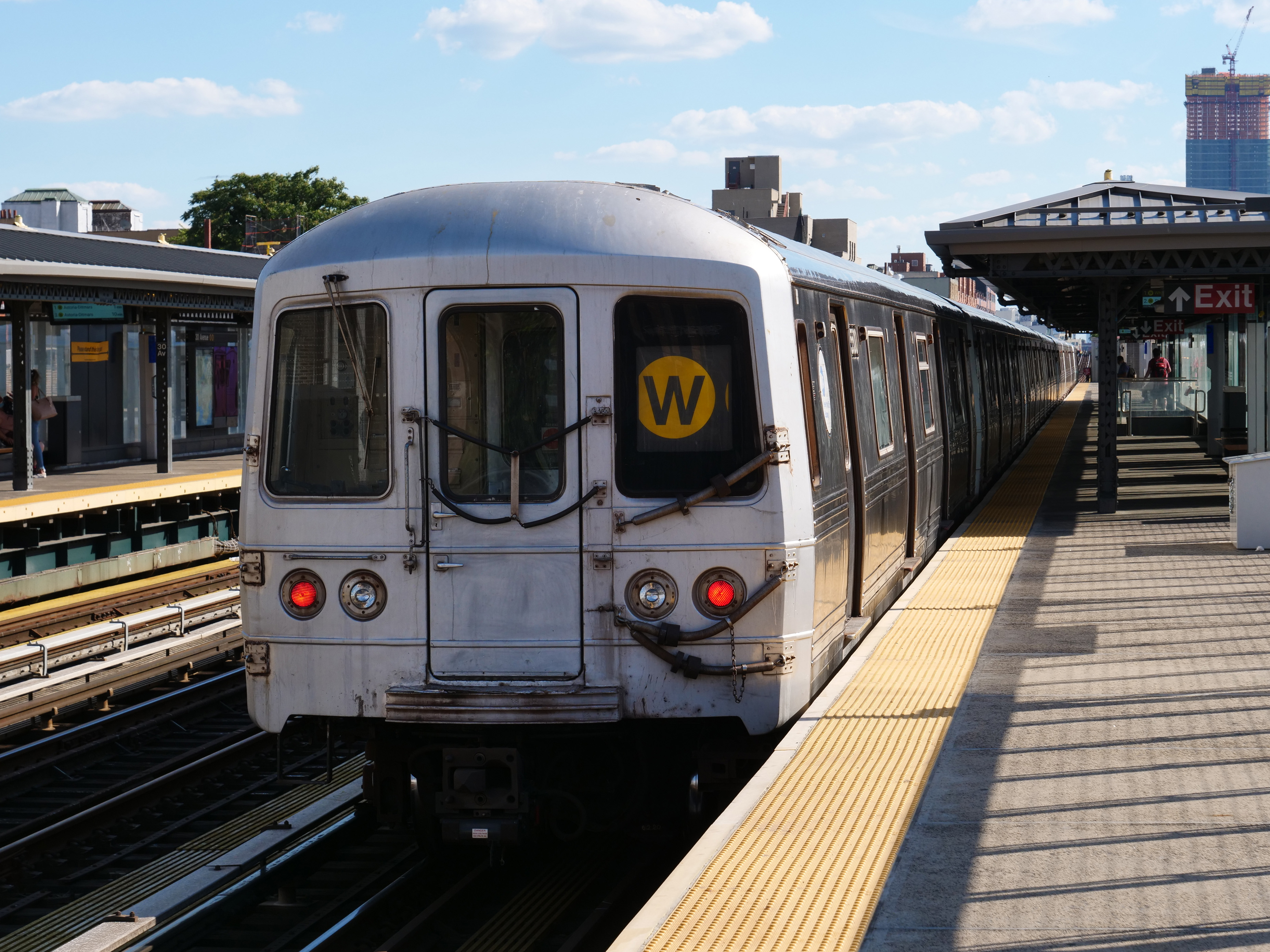
A late 1970s R46 New York City subway car

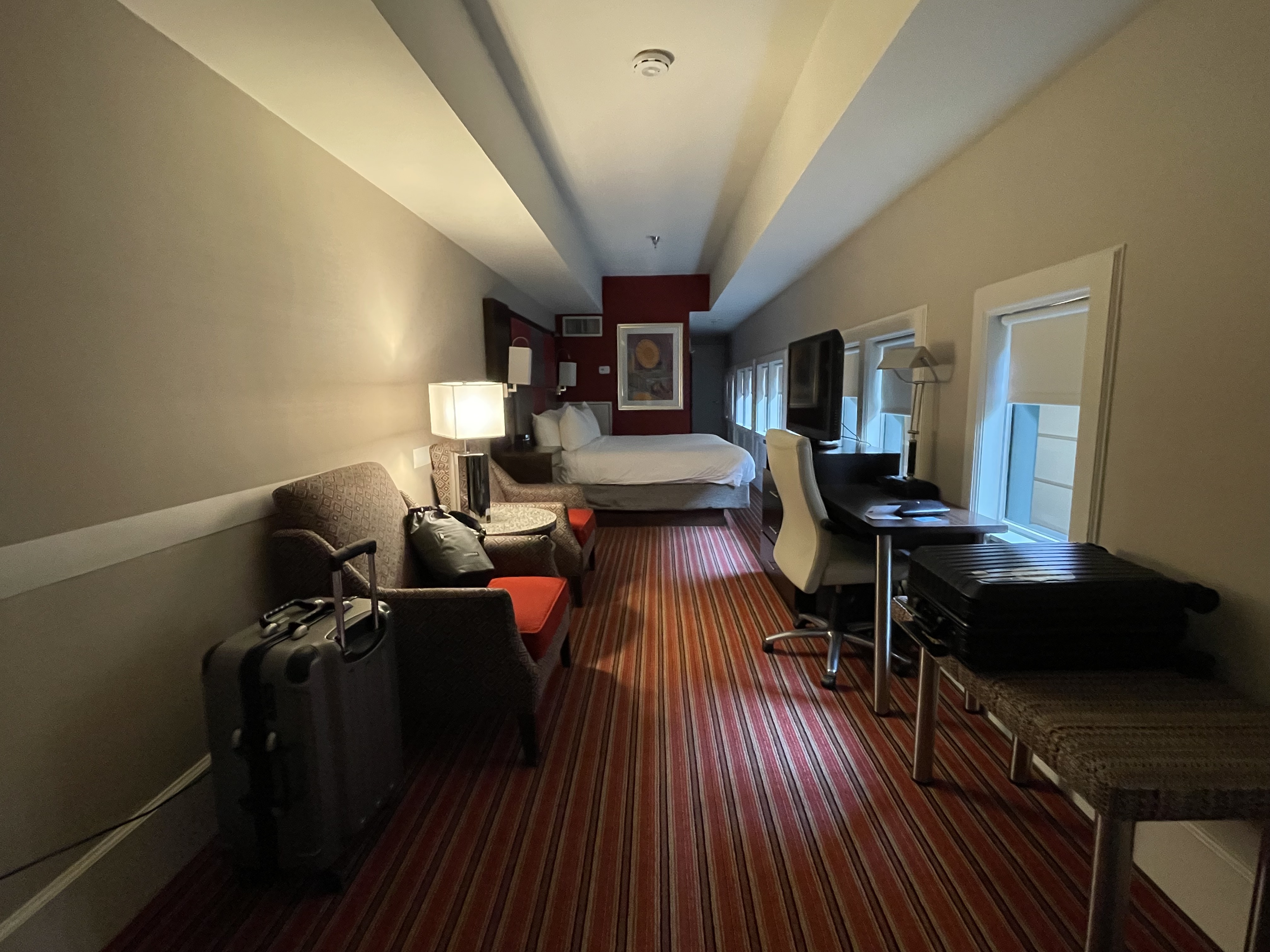

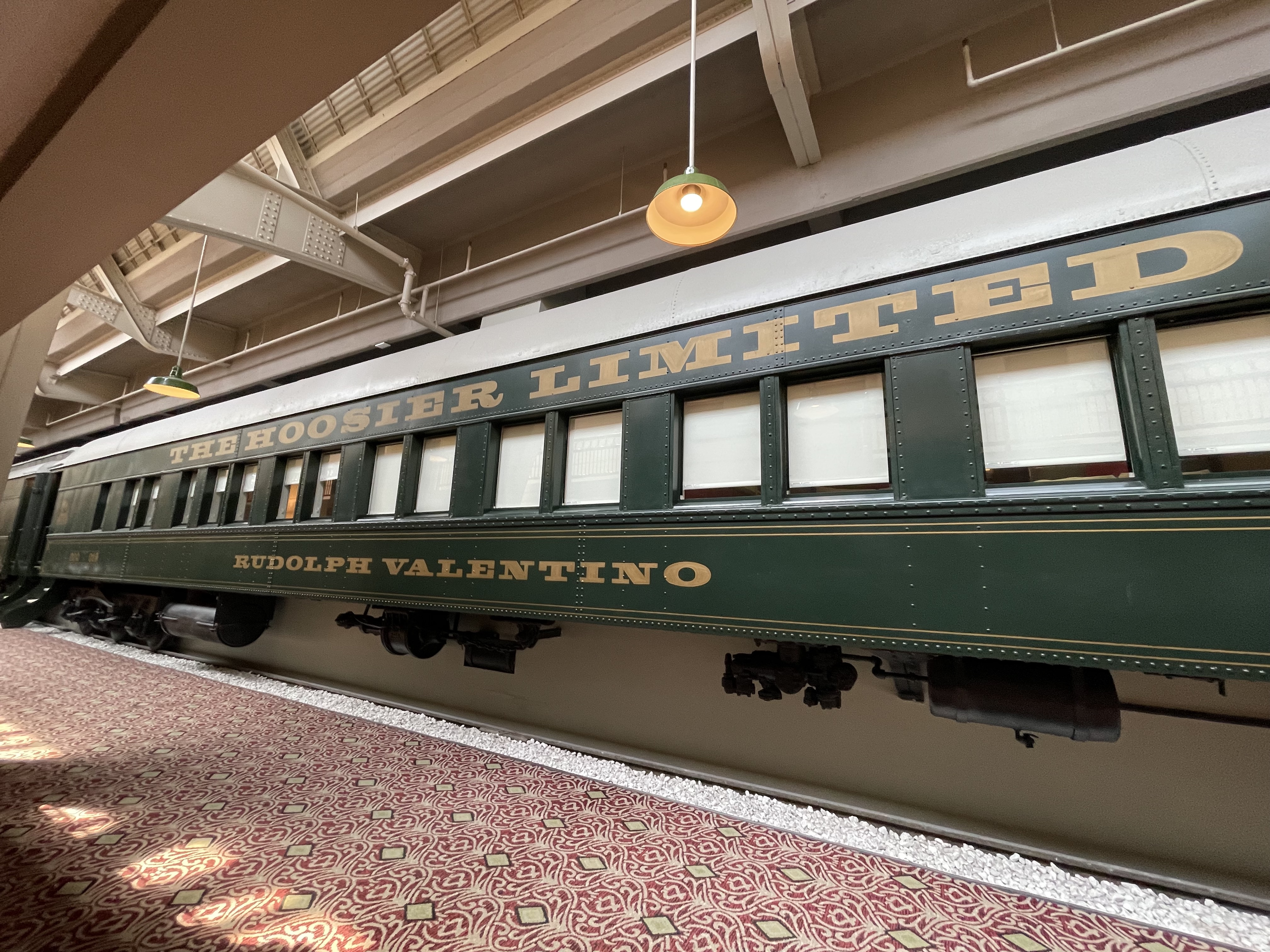

Pullman's streetcar building period lasted from 1891 until 1951. The company one was one of just three builders (and one of only two in the U.S.) of the PCC streetcar, a standardized type of streetcar purchased by numerous North American transit systems between 1936 and 1952 and nearly 5,000 of which were constructed. Pullman built the body of the very first all-new PCC car, a prototype called "model B", in 1934, but the first production-series Pullman PCC cars were not built until 1938 (and delivered in early 1939). The St. Louis Car Company captured about 75% of the U.S. market for PCC cars, with the balance of around 25% being supplied by Pullman.

=== Trolley buses ===
In addition to rail vehicles, Pullman-Standard also manufactured trolley buses – or trolley coaches, as they were more commonly known at the time – starting in 1931 and concluding in late 1952. A total of 2,007 trolley buses were built by the company. Production took place at a former Osgood Bradley Car Company plant in Worcester, Massachusetts, which had come under Pullman control as part of its 1929/30 acquisition of a controlling interest in the Standard Steel Car Company. The vast majority were built for U.S. cities, with only 24 being supplied to Canadian cities and a total of 136 built for cities in South America. The last trolleybuses built were an order of 30 for Valparaíso, Chile, in late 1952. That city's Pullman trolley buses far outlasted any others, and in 2015 about a dozen were still in regular service there, four from the 1952 batch and the others from a larger group built in 1946–48 but partially rebuilt in 1987–88. In 2003, the remaining 15 were declared a National Historic Monument by the Chilean government. In March 2023, the last Pullman trolley buses in Valparaíso were finally retired from service.

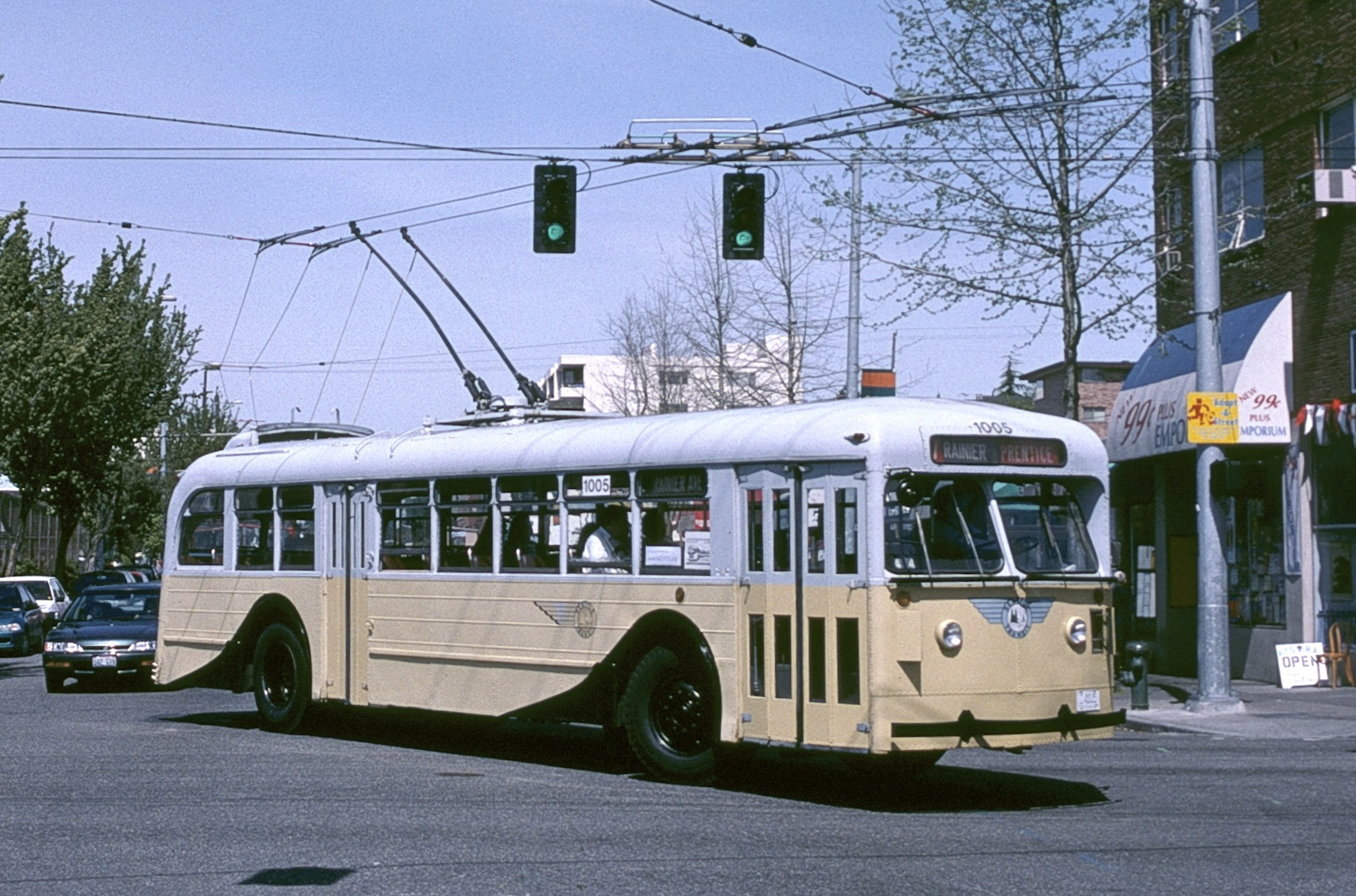
A 1944 Pullman trolley bus that has been preserved in Seattle, for occasional public excursions

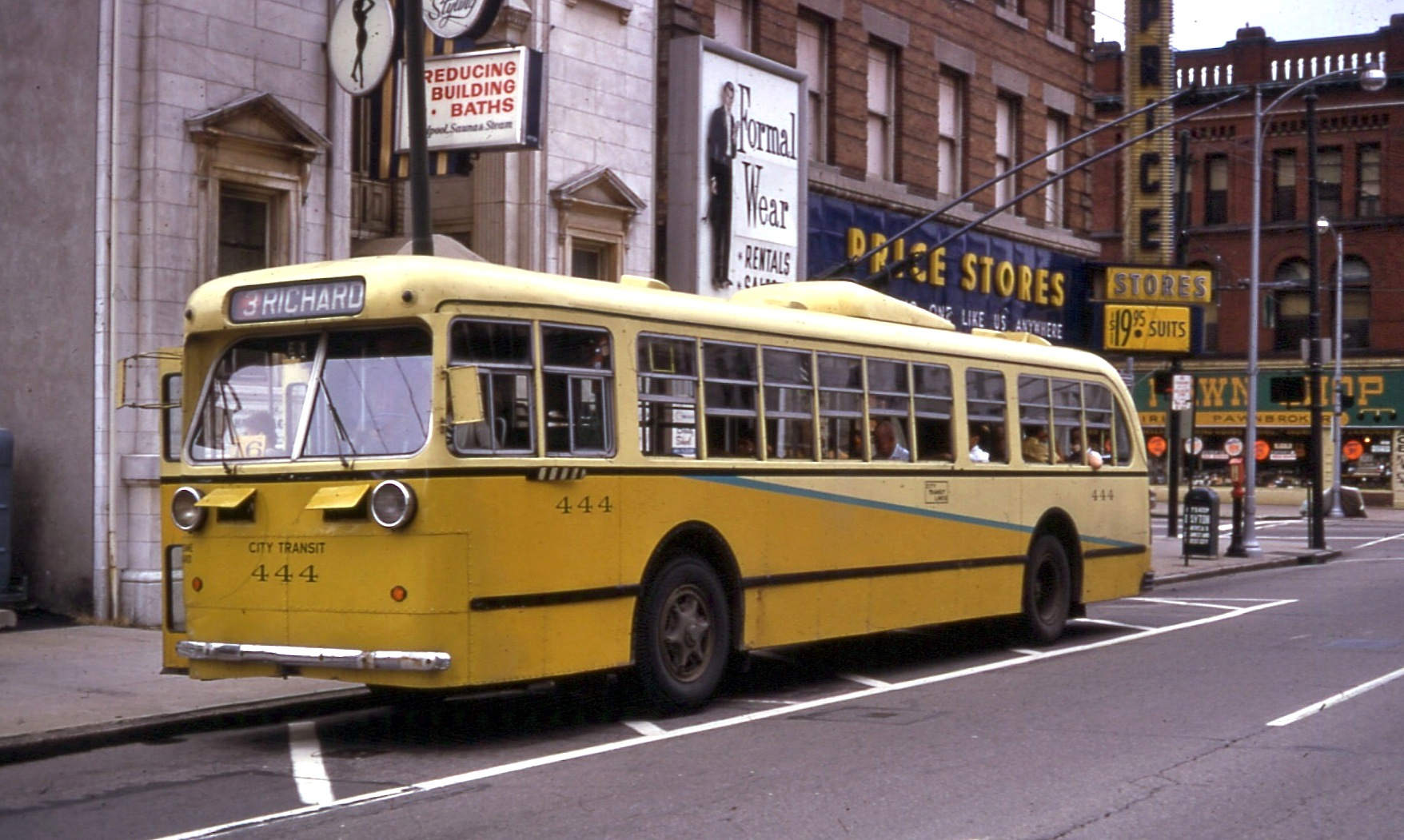
A 1947 Pullman trolley bus in downtown Dayton, Ohio, in 1968

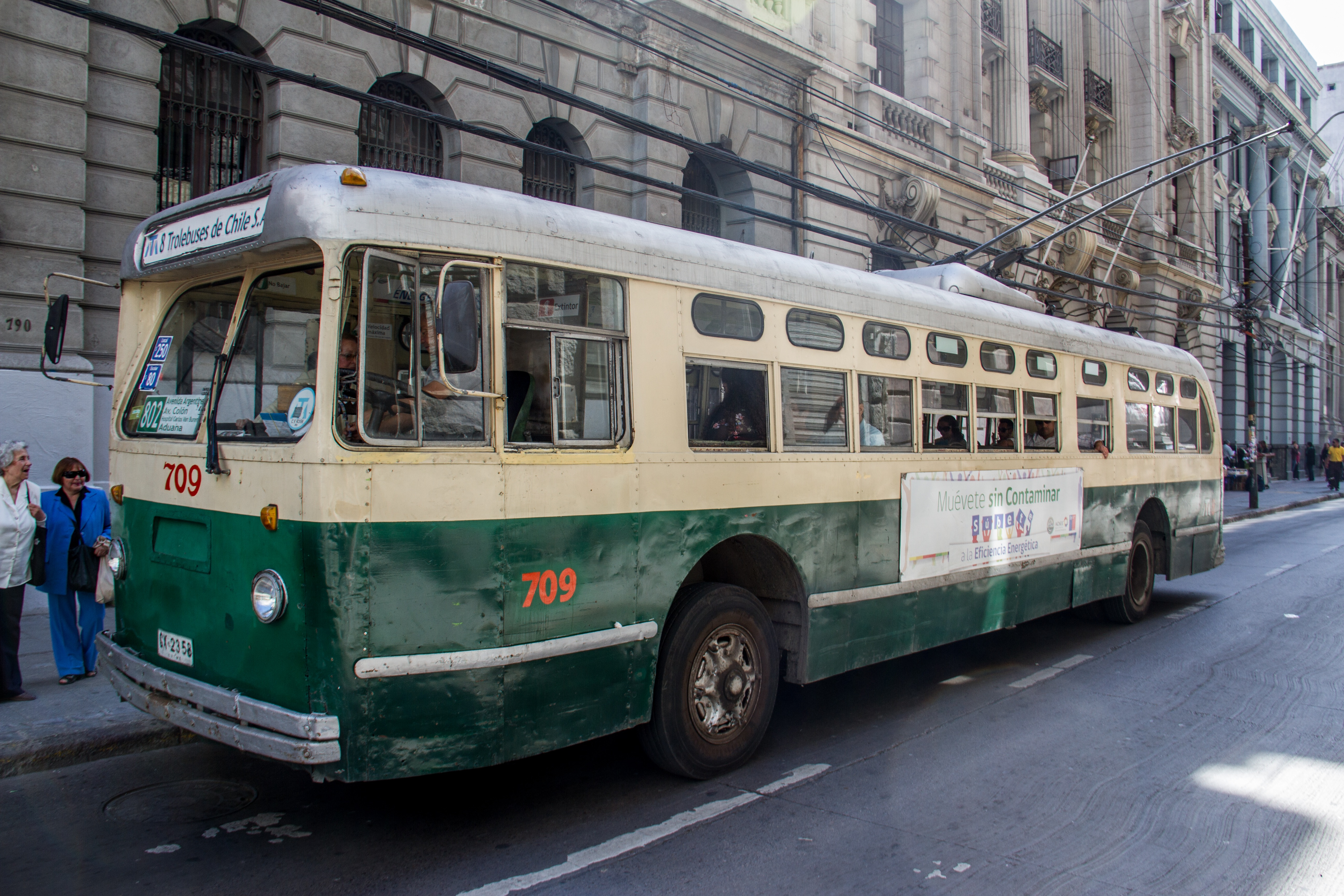
One of the 1952-built Pullman trolley buses in Valparaíso, Chile, in 2014; the last active Pullmans were in service until the early 2020s.

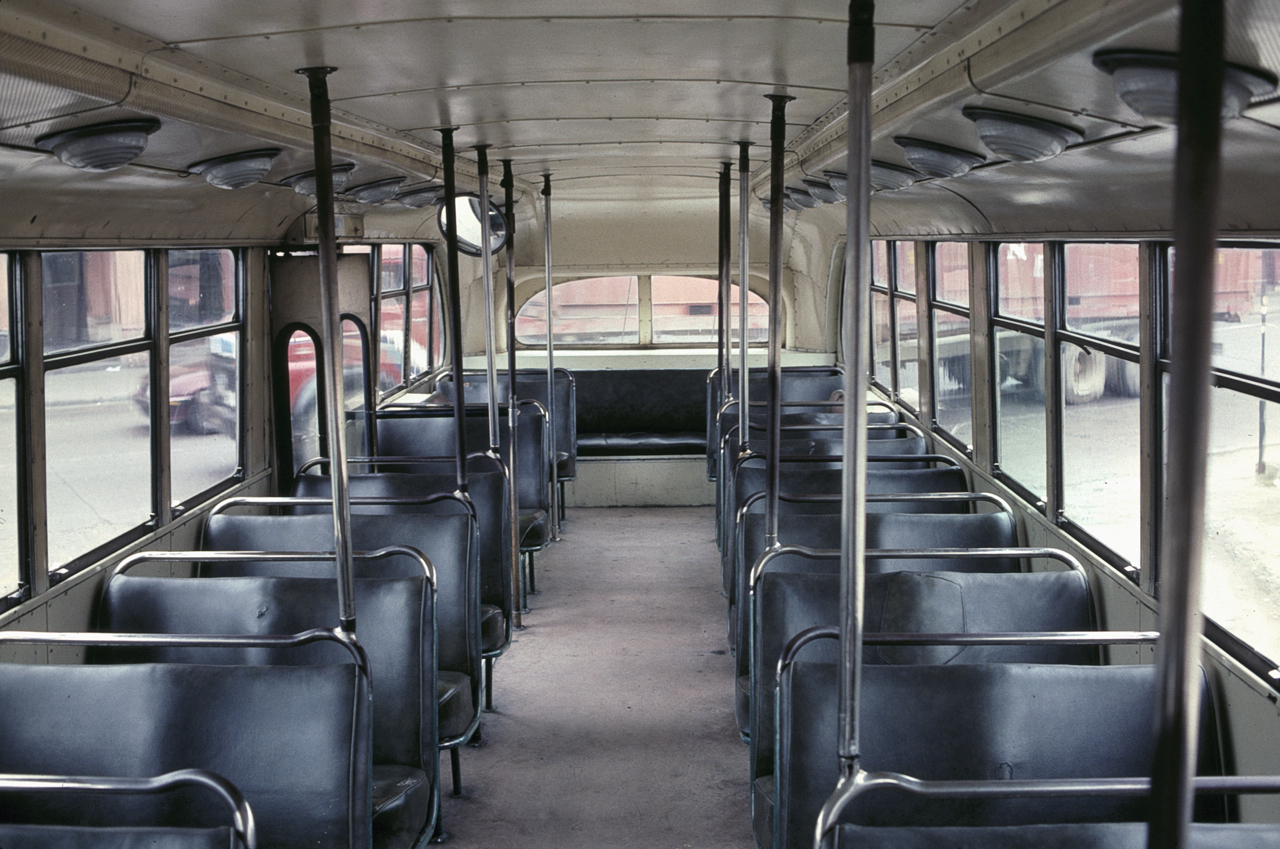
Interior of a Pullman-Standard trolley bus

== See also ==
- Samuel B. Casey Jr.
- List of tram builders
- List of trolleybus manufacturers
- Pullman (car or coach)
- Pullman F.C.
- Pullman train (UK)
- Society for the Prevention of Calling Sleeping Car Porters "George"

== Bibliography ==
- Buder, Stanley (1967). Pullman: An Experiment in Industrial Order and Community Planning 1880–1930. New York: Oxford University Press. ISBN 978-0195008388.
- Kashin, Seymour; Demoro, Harre (1986). An American Original: The PCC Car. Glendale, CA (US): Interurban Press. ISBN 0-916374-73-4.
- Knoll, Charles (1995). Go Pullman: Life and Times. Rochester, NY (US): Rochester Chapter National Railway Historical Society. ISBN 0-9605296-3-2.
- Smith, Carl (2007). Urban Disorder and the Shape of Belief. Chicago and London: The University of Chicago Press. ISBN 978-0226764245.
- Tye, Larry (2004). Rising from the Rails: Pullman Porters and the Making of the Black Middle Class. Henry Holt and Company. ISBN 0-8050-7850-9.
- Welsh, Joe; Bill Howes (2004). Travel by Pullman: a century of service. Saint Paul, MN: MBI. ISBN 0760318573. OCLC 56634363.
