= Paper car wheel =

Passenger railway carriage wheel

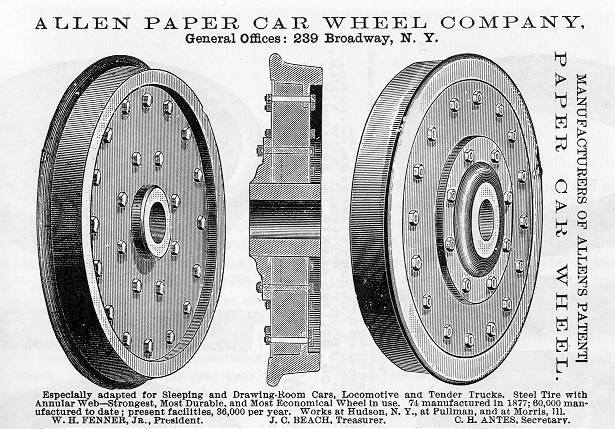
Allen Paper Car Wheel Company advertisement

Paper car wheels were composite wheels of railway carriages, made from a wrought iron or steel rim bolted to an iron hub with an interlayer of laminated paper. The center was made of compressed paper held between two plate-iron disks. Their ability to dampen rail/wheel noise resulted in a quiet and smooth ride for the passengers of North American Pullman dining and sleeping cars.

== Concept ==
Paper car wheels were invented by the locomotive engineer Richard N. Allen (1827–1890), who set up a company with his brother-in-law in 1867, producing paper from straw. They dampened vibrations much better than conventional cast-iron railway wheels, which transmitted all imperfections of the track into the car above it, making train rides noisy and uncomfortable. Paper wheels were especially used in Pullman dining and sleeping cars, which were built, and operated by Pullman, to give passengers in these cars a quieter, vibration-free ride. Due to the composite construction, the wheels would fail faster than the all-metal wheels, which caused derailments. In 1915, the Interstate Commerce Commission, which regulated U.S. railroads, declared paper car wheels to be unsafe, and they went out of use on railroad passenger cars in the United States.

== Manufacture ==
The construction process involved the bonding of 200 circular sheets of paper, as follows. Sets of three circular sheets were bonded into a "sandwich" using a flour-based glue. Additional "sandwiches" were then constructed and placed atop one another to make a 4-foot (1.2 m) high stack. This stack was placed in a 650-ton hydraulic press for three hours. The circular compound disks were then dried and cured for six to eight weeks, leaving no moisture in them. After curing, the compound disks were turned in a lathe to the appropriate size, and 24 or more bolt holes were drilled in them. These compound disks formed the center of each wheel, to which was added a cast-iron hub and steel rim bolted to 1/4-inch (6.4 mm) thick protective metal plates on either side of the paper center. With the bolts tightened, the paper center became a "solid, dense, compressed, composite structure" which could support the weight of the carriages.

=== United States ===
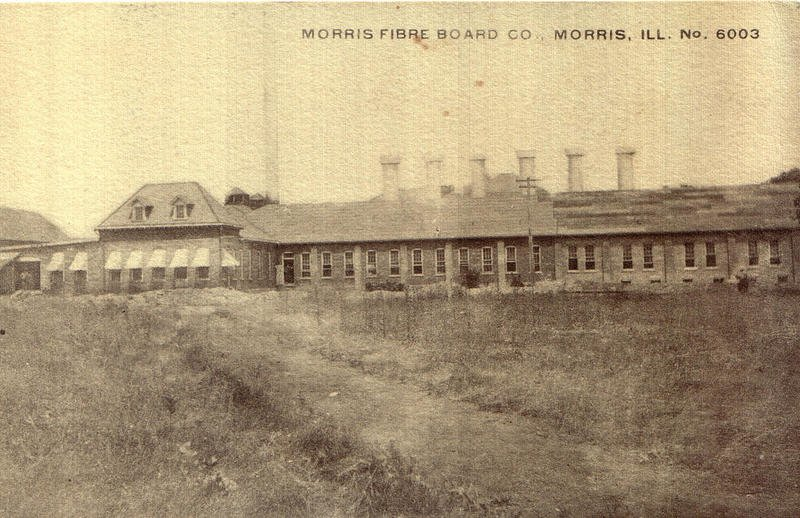
Morris Fibre Board Co, Morris, Illinois

The Allen Paper Car Wheel Works was initially based on East North Street in Morris, Illinois, while its general office was on 239 Broadway, New York. The company's principal customer was the Pullman Palace Car Company in Chicago which, after testing and optimising the wheel, had placed their first order for 100 wheels in 1871. Subsequently, the main plant was established at South Bay in Hudson, New York, in 1873, and eventually relocated onto the site of Pullman's Chicago works.

By 1881, the Allen Paper Car Wheel Co. operated workshops in New York and Chicago, but maintained its processing plant in Morris. Each workshop employed approximately 80 men and produced more than 24 wheels a day. Thus, the company produced and sold thousands of wheels each year. In 1886, the company announced it had 60,000 wheels in service, and by 1893 it had sold 115,000. The Allen Paper Car Wheel Works operated until 1890, when they were transferred to John N. Bunnell and changed their name to the American Straw Board Co. Subsequently, the business and plant were leased, sold and restructured, and operated for the next two decades under different names, including the Morris Box Board Co. In October 1915, the company was restructured and incorporated as the Morris Paper Mills. By the 1920s, the paper mill was one of the largest employers in Morris, producing cardboard boxes of various shapes, sizes, and colors that were shipped throughout the US.

=== United Kingdom ===
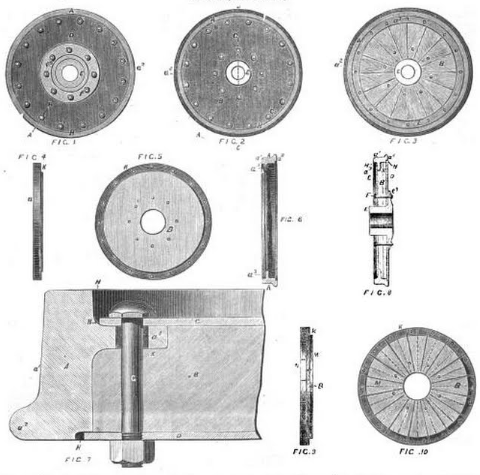
Allen's elastic rail wagon wheels, designed and manufactured by John Brown & Co in Sheffield

The company John Brown & Co in Sheffield, England, came to an agreement with the inventor on the manufacture of paper wheels in Europe. It installed the necessary machines by October 1875, so that production was expected to start in due course.

=== Germany ===
As proposed by the Master Machine Builder Finckbein in Saarbrücken-St. Johann and the Master Craftsman Caesar of the Reichseisenbahn, the oilboard and lacquerware factory of Gebrüder Adt in Forbach produced a paper pulp suitable for railway car wheels after various tests. With the permission of the Royal Railway Administration in Frankfurt a. M., wheelsets with paper discs were manufactured in the main railway workshop in Saarbrücken and in the railway car wheels factory of the van der Zypen brothers in Deutz and then put into use. Such wheelsets with paper pulp discs were in regular service on wagons for a long time. They held perfectly and showed very smooth running while driving without making any annoying noises.

The wheels used in Saarbrücken were constructed in the manner of wooden Mansell wheels, with the wheel tire being placed on the paper disc and the hub in it by means of strong hydraulic pressure, while the tires of the American paper wheels were provided with an inner attachment against which the paper disc was pressed and to which it was connected by bolts. Practice has shown that tires with such an inner approach, apparently due to the uneven mass distribution, cracked from the inside to the outside, so that the advantage of reinforcing the tires was lost and an opposite result was achieved. The tire in conventional Mansell wheels with wooden discs could slip on the wooden disc when the tire was warmed up during braking. In the wheels designed in Saarbrücken, four iron dowels were therefore inserted on each side between the tire and the Mansell ring, which prevented the wheel tires from turning during braking.

== Patents ==
- US Patent No 89,908, 11 May 1869, R.N. Allen & L.W. Kimball: Basic patent
- US Patent No 128,939, 16 July 1872, Richard N. Allen: Improved construction of wheel
- US Patent No RE 7,142, 30 May 1876, Richard N. Allen: Reissue of 89,908
- US Patent No 182,789, 3 October 1876. Richard N. Allen & Albert B. Pullman: Car wheels connecting tire and hub with a variety of “elastic” materials other than paper.
