= Richard Mansell =

Railway engineer

Richard Christopher Mansell (October 1813 in Liverpool – 25 May 1904 in Long Marton, Westmorland) was an English railway engineer.

Mansell was carriage superintendent for the South Eastern Railway at Ashford by 1851, and later works manager for the SER. In 1877 he succeeded Alfred Mellor Watkin as locomotive superintendent of the SER. When James Stirling was appointed in 1878, Mansell resumed the post of works manager until his retirement from the SER in January 1882. On leaving, he was given an annual consultancy fee/pension of fifty guineas.

== Carriages ==
R. C. Mansell was the inventor of the Mansell wheel, a composite wood and metal carriage wheel, for which he obtained patents in 1848, 1862 and 1866.

Use of this design in preference to other methods of affixing tyres to wheels was often indicated following tyre and/or wheel incidents resulting in accidents by investigating officers of the Board of Trade, most notably following the accidents at Hatfield on the Great Northern Railway on Boxing Day (26 Dec) 1870 and Skipton-on-Cherwell on the Great Western Railway on Christmas Eve 1874.

By 1874 there were over 20,000 sets of Mansell wheels in use.

== Locomotives ==
As locomotive superintendent, Mansell designed twelve locomotives: 9 0-4-4T in 1878 and 3 0-6-0 in 1879 (7 others were cancelled). Three 0-6-0Ts that had been designed by Cudworth were also completed under Mansell's supervision in 1877. None of his engines had a distinguished service life. The tank engines lasted about 12 years, and the 0-6-0s about twice as long.

== Family ==
Richard Christopher Mansell was the second of five children born to John Mansell, a Customs House Officer in Liverpool, and his wife Margaret Rothwell. Richard married twice.

He married his first wife, Elizabeth Birchall Norris, 1816 Liverpool - March 1873 Ashford, Kent (died aged 56) at Edge Hill, Liverpool St Mary in 1836. They had three children: Margaret, James Thomas and James Rothwell.

He married his second wife, Emmeline Aldgate Clark, 29 August 1833, St. Pancras, London - 29 August 1912, Long Marton, Westmorland at Camden Haverstock Hill Holy Trinity on 14 April 1874. They had two children: Albert and Emmeline.

== See also ==
- Locomotives of the Southern Railway (UK)

Business positions
Preceded by A. M. Watkin	Chief Mechanical Engineer of South Eastern Railway; 1877–1878	Succeeded by James Stirling
