= Center for the Study of Popular Culture =

Center for the Study of Popular Culture may refer to:

- The David Horowitz Freedom Center, founded in the 1980s by political activist David Horowitz; known as the Center for the Study of Popular Culture until July 2006
- Bowling Green State University Department of Popular Culture, founded in 1968 by Ray Browne as the Center for the Study of Popular Culture

== See also ==
- Popular culture studies
- The Journal of Popular Culture, formerly published at Bowling Green State University; now headquartered at Michigan State University
