= Guild of Scholars of the Episcopal Church =

Learned society for lay academics

The Guild of Scholars of the Episcopal Church is a society of lay Episcopal academics, teachers, artists and professional practitioners which for many years met annually at General Theological Seminary in New York in November of each year. Since 2011, it has met in locations around the US such as Cincinnati, Albuquerque, Holy Cross Monastery in the Hudson Valley, Hope College in Holland, Michigan, and the Virginia Theological Seminary.

As of 2026, Myra Marx Ferree is president of the Guild. The organization publishes an occasional periodical, Vox Scholarium.

== History ==
The guild was founded in 1938 by American philologist and medieval historian Urban T. Holmes Jr. and has included notable members such as W. H. Auden, Cleanth Brooks, Brooks Otis, Henry Babcock Veatch, Frederick Pottle, Stringfellow Barr, George Parshall, Marshall Fishwick, Margaret Morgan Lawrence, Ursula Niebuhr, Dell Hymes, Hyatt Waggoner, Howard D. Roelofs, Hoxie Fairchild, Walter Lowrie (author), Charles Forker, and Richard W. Bailey.

== Current Members and Officers ==
Current members include the literary academics John V. Fleming, Debora Shuger, Marsha Dutton, Jameela Lares, and Nicholas Birns, the musician Royce Boyer, religious historian Philip Jenkins, and the classicist Warren Smith. David Hurd offered a regular organ recital for many years when the Guild was meeting in New York.

- President – Myra Ferree
- Vice-president – John Singleton
- Recording Secretary – John Gatta
- Corresponding Secretary – Michael Krasulski
- Treasurer – Alec Valentine
- Member-at-Large: Edward Hansen

== Chaplains ==
- Norman Pittenger
- J. Robert Wright

== Periodical: Vox Scholarium ==
- 2025: Volume seven
- 2022: Volume four
- 2021: Volume three
