= Shuger =

Shuger is a surname. Notable people with the surname include:

- Debora Shuger (born 1953), American literary historian and scholar
- Scott Shuger (1952-2002), American journalist
