= Mark Shepard (farmer) =

American farmer and author

Mark Shepard is an American farmer and author. Shepard is the founder of Restoration Agriculture Development (RAD) and CEO of Forest Agriculture Enterprises. Shepard coined the term "restoration agriculture", a form of agroforestry that includes raising tree crops and livestock on his New Forest Farm in Viola, Wisconsin. New Forest Farm is a conversion of a typical row crop grain farm into a perennial agricultural ecosystem at the commercial scale. Shepard has advocated for the replacement of staple annual crops with nut crops like chestnuts and hazelnuts.

== Publications ==
- Restoration Agriculture: Real-World Permaculture for Farmers (2014)
- Water for Any Farm: Applying Restoration Agriculture Water Management Methods on Your Farm (2020)
