= Russel B. Nye =

American professor of English and pioneer of pop culture studies

Russel Blaine Nye
- Born: February 17, 1913; Viola, Wisconsin, US
- Died: September 2, 1993 (aged 80); Lansing, Michigan, US
- Education: Oberlin College; University of Wisconsin
- Awards: Pulitzer Prize for Biography or Autobiography (1945)
- Scientific career
- Fields: English and American Culture
- Workplaces: Michigan State University

Russel Blaine Nye (February 17, 1913 – September 2, 1993) was an American professor of English who in the 1960s pioneered popular culture studies. He was the author of a dozen books, including George Bancroft: Brahmin Rebel which won the 1945 Pulitzer Prize for Biography or Autobiography.

Born in Viola, Wisconsin, Nye received his bachelor's degree from Oberlin College in 1934 and his master's degree from the University of Wisconsin in English the following year. In 1938 he married Kathryn Chaney, and in 1940 he completed his doctorate on George Bancroft again at the University of Wisconsin. Nye taught in the English department at Michigan State University from 1941 to 1979.

In 1957 after Ralph Ulveling, the director of the Detroit Public Library, claimed that L. Frank Baum's novel The Wonderful Wizard of Oz had no value and should not be stocked by libraries, Nye and Martin Gardner published a new critical edition of the novel highlighting its value, causing a firestorm of controversy, followed by eventual acceptance.

In 1970 he co-founded the Popular Culture Association with Ray B. Browne and Marshall Fishwick, working to shape a new academic discipline called Popular Culture Theory that blurred the traditional distinctions between high and low culture, focusing on mass culture mediums like television and the Internet, and cultural archetypes like comic book heroes.

He died in Lansing, Michigan in 1993.

== Works ==
- Russel B. Nye, The Mind and Art of George Bancroft (1939)
- Russel B. Nye, George Bancroft: Brahmin Rebel (1944)
- Russel B. Nye, Fettered Freedom: Civil Liberties and the Slavery Controversy 1830-1860 (1948) Michigan State University Press
- Russel B. Nye and Jack Eric Morpurgo, A History of the United States. Volume One: The Birth of the U.S.A. (1955; Third Edition 1970)
- Russel B. Nye and Jack Eric Morpurgo, A History of the United States. Volume Two: The Growth of the U.S.A. (1955; Third Edition 1970) Penguin Books
- Russel B. Nye and Martin Gardner, The Wizard of Oz and Who He Was (1957)
- Russel B. Nye, The cultural life of the new Nation, 1776-1830 (1960) New York: Harper
- Russel B. Nye, This almost chosen people; essays in the history of American ideas (1966) Michigan State University Press
- Russel B. Nye and Ray B. Browne, Crises on Campus (1971)
- Russel B. Nye and Arra M. Garab, Modern Essays (1971)
- Russel B. Nye, Society and culture in America, 1830-1860 (1974) New York: Harper
- Russel B. Nye, History, Meaning and Method (1975)
- Joseph G. Waldmeir, Essays in Honor of Russel B. Nye (1978)
- Harold E. Hinds et al. (eds.), Popular Culture Theory and Methodology: A Basic Introduction (2006)

== Sources ==
- "Russel Nye, Historian, Dies at 80; A Student of Comics, Jazz and TV" New York Times, September 5, 1993
- Herder, Dale (1994) "A Tribute to Russel B. Nye 1913 -- 1993"] MSU Alumni Magazine, Winter 1994
- Brief Biography on the Wisconsin Library Association's web site
