= Marshall Fishwick =

American journalist

Marshall William Fishwick
- Born: July 5, 1923; Roanoke, Virginia
- Died: May 22, 2006 (aged 82); Blacksburg, Virginia
- Occupations: Professor, journalist, author

Marshall William Fishwick (July 5, 1923 – May 22, 2006) was an American multidisciplinary scholar, professor, writer, and editor who started the academic movement known as popular culture studies and established the journal International Popular Culture. In 1970 he cofounded the Popular Culture Association with Ray B. Browne and Russel B. Nye, and the three worked to shape a new academic discipline that blurred the traditional distinctions between high and low culture, focusing on mass culture mediums like television and the Internet and cultural archetypes like comic book heroes. In an academic career of more than fifty years, Fishwick wrote or edited more than forty books, including works on popular culture, Virginia history, and American studies.

== Biography ==
Born in Roanoke, Virginia, he was a graduate of Jefferson High School. Fishwick was one of four children in his family, having two sisters and one brother, railroad executive, John Fishwick. Marshall Fishwick held degrees from the University of Virginia, the University of Wisconsin, and Yale University, and he later received honorary degrees from Bombay University, and Dhaka University. During his career, he received eight Fulbright Awards and numerous additional grants which enabled him to introduce the popular culture discipline at home and abroad in Denmark, Germany, Italy, Poland, Russia, Bangladesh, India, and Korea.

Fishwick began his teaching career at Washington and Lee University in 1949. Fishwick, professor emeritus in the College of Liberal Arts and Human Sciences at Virginia Tech retired in 2003.

Fishwick co-founded the Popular Culture Association in the late 1960s. In 1997 he was presented the Life Achievement Award in Popular Culture by the Popular Culture Association. In 1998 Fishwick was honored with a lifetime achievement award by the American Culture Association.

As a Fulbright Distinguished Professor, he has worked with scholars and students in many countries and helped establish the American Studies Research Center in Hyderabad, India, the largest Asian collection of American books. Fishwick founded the journal International Popular Culture, and was co-founder of the Popular Culture Association. He served as the association's president and was advisory editor of both the Journal of Popular Culture and the Journal of American Culture. Fishwick served as Advisory Editor to the Journal of American Culture and was a Senior Editor at Haworth Press.

Throughout his career he contributed articles on American studies and popular culture to papers and journals all over the world; he also published numerous articles and commentaries in American magazines and newspapers. He went on to write more than twenty books and edited an additional dozen in the fields of history, literature, education, theology, and communication. Fishwick also authored many books including American Heroes: Myth and Reality, American Studies in Transition, Icons in Popular Culture, An American Mosaic: Rethinking American Culture History, Popular Culture: Cavespace to Cyberspace, and Go and Catch a Falling Star.

Fishwick's literary career began while he was at sea with the Atlantic Fleet during World War II. His collected poems, The Face of Jang, were published in 1945. After the war, he earned a doctorate in American Studies at Yale University. His dissertation was published as A New Look at the Old Dominion. A lifelong interest in heroes resulted in such titles as Virginians on Olympus, The Hero: Myth and Reality, The Hero: American Style, Heroes of Popular Culture, and The Hero in Transition. Other titles included Lee after the War, General Lee's Photographer, Springlore in Virginia, and Faust Revisited.

His books on popular culture included Seven Pillars of Popular Culture, Common Culture and the Great Tradition, Great Awakenings: Popular Religion in America, and most recently, two textbooks, Go and Catch a Falling Star and An American Mosaic. An inveterate traveler, Fishwick reminisced about his journeys in Around the World in Forty Years. His most recent book, Cicero and Popular Culture, is in press and was published posthumously.

He died on May 22, 2006. He was 82.
