= Bowling Green State University Department of Popular Culture =

Department of Popular Culture
- Founder: Ray Browne
- Type: Education
- Location: Bowling Green, Ohio
- Region served: Bowling Green, Ohio
- Department Chair: Kristen Rudisill
- Parent organization: Bowling Green State University
- Staff: 12
- Website: Popular Culture Website

Bowling Green State University Department of Popular Culture is the first Popular Culture department in the United States. The department was founded by Professor Ray Browne in 1973. The Popular Culture department is unique as it is the only one in the US to offer both Bachelor's degrees and Master's degrees in Popular Culture.

== History ==
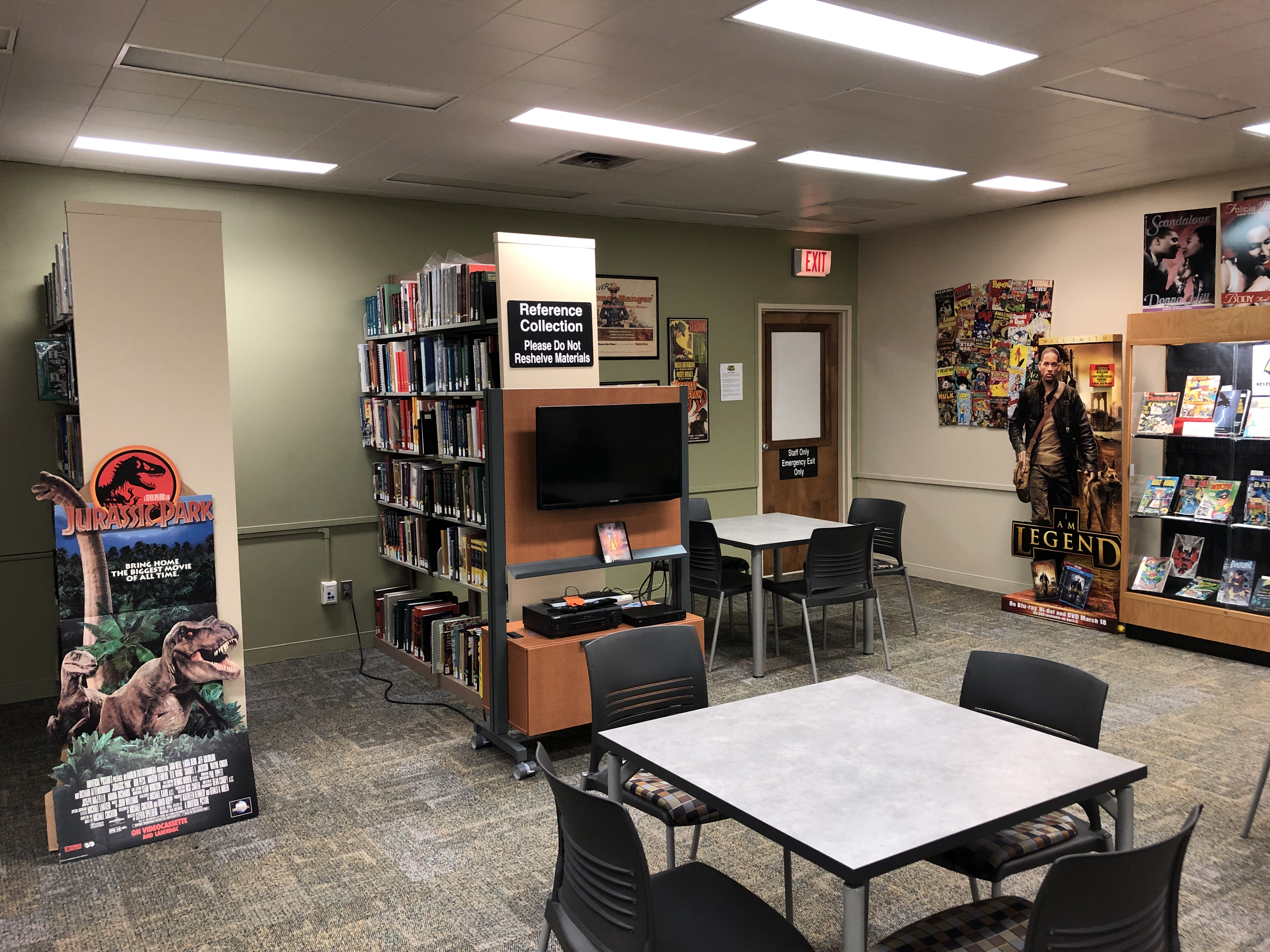
The pop-culture library on campus

=== Popular Culture House ===
On July 21, 2012, Bowling Green State University announced their plans to demolish the Popular Culture building that housed the department. The Popular Culture building was home to four former presidents of the university before the Popular Culture department moved in. The building was purchased by the university in 1932, and was formerly called Virgil House. Over 2000 supporters protested the demolition plans of the Popular Culture building. However the protests were unsuccessful and the university continued with plans to demolish the building. The building was demolished on August 10, 2012, one week ahead of time. The demolished Popular Culture house was replaced by a student health center. The Popular Culture department moved into Shatzel Hall, alongside the Asian Studies department.

== Faculty and staff ==
For the 2018/19 school year, the faculty and staff are

- Jeffrey Brown, Professor
- Charles Coletta, Lecturer
- Becca Cragin, Associate professor
- Matthew Donahue, Lecturer
- Montana Miller, Associate professor
- Angela Nelson, Associate professor
- Kristen Rudisill, Associate professor
- Jack Santino, Professor
- Jeremy Wallach, Professor

Retired or emeritus faculty include:

- Ray B. Browne (1922–2009)
- Christopher D. Geist
- Michael T. Marsden
- Marilyn Motz
- John G. Nachbar

Other Former Faculty

- Carl B. Holmberg
- Jon Michael Spencer
