= Howard D. Roelofs =

American philosopher

- Born: 7 April 1893; Grand Rapids, Michigan
- Died: 12 August 1974; East Aurora, New York
- Occupation: Philosopher

Howard Dykema Roelofs (7 April 1893 – 12 August 1974) was an American philosopher.

== Career ==
Roelofs was born in Grand Rapids, Michigan. He was educated at Amherst College from 1911 to 1913 and at the University of Michigan where he obtained his BA in 1915 and MA in 1916. He earned his PhD in philosophy from Harvard University in 1925; his dissertation was on "The Nature and Function of Authority".

From 1927 to 1931 he was associate professor of philosophy at Stanford University. In 1932, he was appointed Obed J. Wilson Professor of Ethics and Head of the Department of Philosophy at the University of Cincinnati. He held these positions until his retirement in 1960.

He was Dean of the McMicken College of Liberal Arts from 1933 to 1936. In 1949, he received an honorary LHD degree from Ripon College. Roelefs was an Aristotelian realist which he combined with Cartesian dualism. He was an opponent of materialism and pragmatism. He is best known for his papers Theology in Theory and Practice (1951) and A Case for Dualism and Interaction (1955). He argued that an explanation of the unity of mind and body was still required but dualistic interaction was the best option to account for the evidence of experience.

== Personal life ==
Roelofs married Miriam Hubbard in 1917. They had four daughters and two sons. His son Howard Mark Roelofs was professor emeritus of New York University.

Roelofs was a Christian was a member of the Guild of Scholars of the Episcopal Church. He died at his home Arden Farm, in East Aurora, New York.

== Selected publications ==
- Theology in Theory and Practice (1951)
- A Case for Dualism and Interactionism (1955)
