= Ray B. Browne =

American educator and author; founder of academic pop culture studies in the US

Ray Broadus Browne
- Born: January 15, 1922
- Died: October 22, 2009 (aged 87)
- Citizenship: American
- Occupation(s): educator, author
- Known for: Founder of the academic study of popular culture in the United States.

Ray Broadus Browne (/braʊn/ "brown"; January 15, 1922 – October 22, 2009) was an American educator, author, and founder of the academic study of popular culture in the United States. He was Distinguished Professor Emeritus at Bowling Green State University (BGSU) in Bowling Green, Ohio. He founded the first (and only) academic Department of Popular Culture at BGSU in 1972, and is the founding editor of the Journal of Popular Culture, the Journal of American Culture, and the Popular Press (a university-based press that published hundreds of books on popular culture). He also founded the Library for Popular Culture Studies (BPCL) at BGSU (which today bears his name), the Popular Culture Association, and the American Culture Association. His particular area of specialization was American popular literature, and he was an authority on Herman Melville, Mark Twain, the popular culture surrounding Abraham Lincoln and the American Civil War, and the influence of Shakespeare on American popular music.

== Early life ==
Ray Browne was born in Millport, Alabama, on January 15, 1922, the youngest of four children. His father, Garfield Browne, was a bank manager and later bank president of various small-town banks in the south. Browne's mother was Anne Nola Browne (née Trull). The family moved on numerous occasions during Browne's early life as his father sought new opportunities in banking. Browne lived for short periods of time in Arkansas and Florida, and for longer periods in Epes, Alabama, and, off and on, in Millport, Alabama. The family finally settled in Millport, where Browne graduated from high school. Browne's father lost his bank, his job, and his life savings in the stock market crash of 1929, and he grew up in poverty during the Great Depression.

== College and World War II ==
Browne attended the University of Alabama due to the encouragement of a high school teacher, Elbert Coleman, and the financial support of his sister Joan. Following graduation, he immediately entered the U.S. Army and served in an artillery corps in the European theater in World War II. His unit entered Europe at Marseille and was part of the allied thrust that drove the Germans back into Germany. His corps was in Germany at the war's end.

Following the war, Browne was one of thousands of GIs who stayed in Europe for a year. He studied Shakespeare and early Greek philosophy at the University of Birmingham and literature at the University of Nottingham in England.

== Early academic life ==
Browne returned to the United States and entered the master's program at Columbia University, graduating with a degree in Victorian literature. From there he took a faculty position in English at the University of Nebraska, where he was influenced by recently retired folklorist Louise Pound. Following two years of teaching, he entered the Ph.D. program in English at the University of California, Los Angeles in 1950. His two mentors at UCLA were the famed Americanist Leon Howard and well-known folklorist Wayland Hand. Browne's dissertation was on the topic of Alabama folksongs. His dissertation was later turned into a book entitled The Alabama Folk Lyric: A Study in the Origins and Media of Dissemination (1979). He received his Ph.D. in 1956.

Upon graduation from UCLA, Browne took a job as an assistant professor at the University of Maryland. He served on the faculty for four years before moving to Purdue University in Lafayette, Indiana in 1960. His years at Purdue were distinguished by significant professional advancement. He published numerous books in the area of American culture and literature that would lay the foundation for his later works, including Critical Approaches to American Literature: Roger Williams to Herman Melville (1965, with Martin Light), New Voices in American Studies (1966, with Donald Winkleman and Allen Hayman), and Frontiers of American Culture (1967, with Richard Crowder, Virgil Lokke, and William Stafford). His years at Purdue were also marked by a growing conviction that English departments were not teaching a wide enough spectrum of literature. In particular, Browne believed that popular literature was unduly ignored (and denigrated) by traditional academics. In 1967, Browne moved to the Department of English at Bowling Green State University in Bowling Green, Ohio, where he saw an opportunity to begin teaching courses in popular culture and American culture on a wide scale.

== Primary academic life ==
In his early years at B.G.S.U., Browne founded the Journal of Popular Culture (JPC) in 1967 and the Center for the Study of Popular Culture in 1968. JPC was the first peer-reviewed journal for scholarly work in the area of popular culture. His early efforts in the Department of English led in 1973 to the establishment of a separate Department of Popular Culture which began by offering an M.A. program, followed by the establishment of the undergraduate major a year later. This department was the first formal attempt to promote serious scholarly inquiry into what most people do with most of their free time. The Department of Popular Culture quickly grew and continues to flourish at B.G.S.U. today.

Browne was named a Distinguished University Professor at BGSU in 1977 and taught there until his retirement in 1992.

In 1970, Browne founded the Popular Press to publish books on popular culture and the popular arts. His wife Pat soon became the manager of the press and was the driving force through its growth as the premier publishing outlet for academic books on popular culture until her retirement in 2002. At that point the Popular Press was acquired by the University of Wisconsin Press.

In 1969, Browne founded and began to develop the Popular Culture Library at B.G.S.U. This library now holds 190,000 catalogued books and many hundreds of thousands of additional materials (e.g., comic books, fanzines, photos, games, postcards, posters). It is one of the most important collections of popular culture artifacts in the world. The library is now named the Ray and Pat Browne Popular Culture Library.

In 1970, Browne founded the Popular Culture Association as an organization to promote the study of popular culture. In 1979, he founded the American Culture Association to promote specifically the study of American culture, and the same year was founding editor of the Journal of American Culture.

In 1971, Browne organized the first national conference of the Popular Culture Association. This conference showcased the broad conceptual thinking and foundational ideas that would lead to the widespread teaching of popular culture at American and international universities. The conference grew quickly in size and participation, and for many years has featured the presentation of more than 2000 academic papers at each conference. The 2009 conference in New Orleans marked the 39th annual conference.

In 1979, Browne helped organize the first national conference of the American Culture Association. This conference is held in conjunction with the Popular Culture Association Conference and marked its 30th anniversary with the 2009 conference.

Browne had numerous colleagues with whom he worked in developing the academic study of popular culture, including Russel B. Nye of Michigan State University, Marshall Fishwick of Virginia Tech, Carl Bode of the University of Maryland, John Cawelti of the University of Chicago, Michael Marsden of Bowling Green State University (now Academic Vice President at St. Norbert College), Daniel Walden of Penn State University, and Peter Rollins of Oklahoma State University.

== Bibliography ==
Ray Browne's works through the years laid the conceptual foundations for the study of popular culture. 4

=== Essays ===
- "Popular Culture: Notes Toward a Definition", which first appeared in the book Popular Culture and Curricula (1972, edited by Ray Browne and Ronald Ambrosetti),

=== Books ===
- Popular Beliefs and Practices from Alabama (1958)
- Challenges in American Culture (1970, with Larry Landrum and W.K. Bottorff)
- Icons of Popular Culture (1970, with Marshall Fishwick)
- Melville's Drive to Humanism (1971)
- Popular Culture and the Expanding Consciousness (1973),
- The Popular Culture Explosion (1972, with David Madden)
- Heroes of Popular Culture (1972, with Marshall Fishwick and Michael Marsden)
- Dimensions of Detective Fiction (1976, with Larry Landrum and Pat Browne)
- A Night With the Hants & Other Alabama Folk Experiences (1976)
- Icons of America (1978, with Marshall Fishwick)
- Rituals and Ceremonies in Popular Culture (1980)
- Objects of Special Devotion: Fetishism in Popular Culture (1982)
- Against Academia (Popular Press, 1989; a semi-autobiographical book)
- Dominant Symbols in Popular Culture (1990, with Marshall Fishwick and Kevin O. Browne)
- The Many Tongues of Literacy (1992)
- Continuities in Popular Culture: The Present in the Past & the Past in the Present and Future (1993, with Ronald Ambrosetti)
- The Detective as Historian: History and Art in Historical Crime Fiction (2000, with Lawrence Kreiser)
- Ordinary Reactions to Extraordinary Events (2001, with Arthur Neal)
- The Guide to United States Popular Culture (2001, with Pat Browne)
- Mission Underway: The History of the Popular Culture Association/American Culture Association and the Popular Culture Movement 1967–2001 (2002)
- Popular Culture Studies Across the Curriculum (2005)
- Profiles of Popular Culture: A Reader (2005)

Browne also published hundreds of essays and articles in academic journals and published hundreds of book reviews, most notably in the Journal of American Culture.

== International conferences and travel ==
As a means of promoting the academic study of popular culture internationally, Ray and Pat Browne organized numerous conferences in the United Kingdom from 1978 until 2001. These included a 1978 conference at Chichester, a 1980 conference at Winchester, 1993 at York, 1995 at Oxford, 1997 at York, 1999 at Cambridge, and 2001 at Cambridge.

In addition to their international conferences, Ray and Pat made two round-the-world trips on behalf of the U.S. State Department to promote the study of American popular culture. Their travels led them to the Soviet Union, India, Korea, Japan, Indonesia, Australia, and New Zealand.

== The term "popular culture" ==
Ray Browne was credited with coining the term "popular culture" in 1967; however, he did not originate this term. In 1973, Browne created the first academic program dedicated to studying popular culture at Bowling Green University. Browne created this program because he wanted to know the effects of society on culture and the effects of culture on society. Browne stressed to scholars that it was important to learn about the irrelevant changes in peoples' lives. However, many scholars criticized Browne for trying to belittle their teachings when he created the "popular culture department". Browne's work inspired other universities to offer classes that explore popular culture.

== Publicity ==
Browne's work in popular culture was recognized not only in academia, but also by news organizations. Through the years he appeared twice on the CBS Evening News, twice on the Phil Donahue Show, twice on the Geraldo Rivera Show, and on BBC News, and was quoted in hundreds of magazines and newspapers including Newsweek, The New York Times, The Wall Street Journal, The Chicago Tribune, People, and many others.

== Personal life and death ==
Browne married Olwyn Carmen Orde in 1952. They had three children: Glenn (born 1956), Kevin (born 1958), and Rowan (born 1961). Olwyn and Rowan were killed in an automobile accident in 1964.

Browne was remarried in 1965 to Alice Maxine (Pat) Matthews (born 1932). They had a daughter, Alicia (born 1967). Pat helped Browne develop the popular culture movement through her management of the Popular Press and her role as a principal organizer of the Popular Culture Association and American Culture Association conferences and the international popular culture conferences from the 1970s until her retirement in 2002. She also edited the scholarly journal Clues: A Journal of Detection for many years. Ray and Pat together edited the compendium volume The Guide to United States Popular Culture (Popular Press, 2001).

Ray and Pat Browne lived in retirement in Bowling Green, Ohio where Browne continued to write and serve as book review editor for the Journal of American Culture until his death.

Browne died in his home in Bowling Green, Ohio on October 22, 2009.
