= Monoculture (popular culture) =

Concept of popular culture being experienced globally

The monoculture (also called global monoculture) is a concept in popular culture studies in which facets of popular culture are experienced by everyone at once, either globally or nationally. Critics such as Robert Christgau and Chuck Klosterman have posited that the monoculture existed from the 1950s to the 1990s and early 2000s but had ended by the 21st century, mainly toward the early 2020s, due to the rise of streaming media and the fracturing of popular culture. Other critics, like Linda Holmes and Steven Hyden, have suggested that the concept of the monoculture is a myth.

== Definition ==
The monoculture has been defined as the sociological concept of a unifying and shared cultural experience among the global or national masses, such as through listening to the same songs on the radio, watching the same films or television series on the same channels, or purchasing mass market goods. It is typically economically motivated; based around blockbuster films, albums, or television series; and largely based on Western popular culture. Music critic Robert Christgau described it as being hegemonic and "show[ing] a certain amount of instinctive, intuitive, reflective influence of its creation". For Vox, Kyle Chayka described it as representing both a "monolithic culture" and a "monotonous culture" and wrote that it is "a subjective, shifting frame of reference, not a default reality".

== History ==
=== 1960s to 2000s ===
According to Chayka, the time during which the monoculture existed is "ill-defined" and spans from The Tonight Show Starring Johnny Carson to Seinfeld, Friends, and The Office, but that broadcast TV allowed for viewers to have a "monocultural feeling" of knowing that others were watching the same channel as them. In his 2022 book The Nineties, Chuck Klosterman outlines the monoculture as existing from the 1960s to the 1990s. Singer "Weird Al" Yankovic described the mainstream in the 1980s as "almost a monoculture", while the immense popularity of MTV in the 1990s has been described as an element of the monoculture. By 2001, Maude Barlow argued that, due to free market ideology and "the massive US entertainment-industrial complex", the global monoculture had "infiltrated every corner of the Earth" and was leading to the endangerment of local artisanship and Indigenous cultures. In the 2000s, YouTube and file sharing allowed popular culture from the past to be preserved and shared, which Simon Reynolds of The Guardian stated created "an effect of atemporality" that preceded the disappearance of the monoculture. The Golden Age of Television also began in the 2000s, and the phenomenon of "appointment TV" series such as Breaking Bad and The Sopranos, according to Reynolds, reinforced the existence of the monoculture. Darren Mooney of The Escapist wrote that the TV series Lost (2004–2010) "occupied the popular imagination" and described it as part of the monoculture during its runtime.

By 2006 Robert Christgau stated that the Balkanization of music had led to the end of monoculture. The 2009 death of Michael Jackson also led to an uptick in opinion pieces about the death of the monoculture. Noel Murray of The A.V. Club noted the disparity between media that was being consumed en masse and that which critics paid attention to and stated that those proclaiming that the monoculture had died were "describing their own relationship to that culture, more than anything".

=== 2010s to present ===
In an article for Salon, cultural critic Touré wrote in 2011, "We no longer live in a monoculture ... pop culture's ability to unify has been crippled," adding that "massive music moments" ended after the releases of the albums The Chronic (1992) by Dr. Dre and Nevermind (1991) by Nirvana and had become "less intense" and "shorter" in the years to follow. Later that year, The Economist, in response to Touré's article, argued that there were still "widely shared cultural experiences", including Katy Perry's album Teenage Dream yielding five number-one singles on the Billboard Hot 100, Barack Obama doing the dance from the music video for Beyoncé's song "Single Ladies (Put a Ring on It)", and the virality of Rebecca Black's song "Friday". NPR's Chris Molanphy wrote in 2012 that the monoculture had been "reinvigorated" due to the top three songs on the Billboard Year-End Hot 100 singles list of that year—"Somebody That I Used to Know" by Gotye, "Call Me Maybe" by Carly Rae Jepsen, and "We Are Young" by Fun—"each seem[ing] to own U.S. culture ... at their respective peaks". Also for Salon in the summer of 2016, Scott Timberg opined that "the monoculture is as strong as ever", citing the ubiquity of superhero films and celebrities, particularly Taylor Swift, and the homogeneity of music nominated at the 2016 MTV Video Music Awards as examples of its existence. He argued that the "near-infinite offerings" of the Internet led people to "get overwhelmed and just fall back on what we know already".

In the 2010s, streaming media platforms such as Netflix, Amazon Prime Video, and Spotify encouraged users to be individualistic in their media consumption, which Reynolds stated was "slowly but surely ... killing the idea of a mainstream" that was being replaced by the proliferation of "micro-scenes" and subcultures. Multiple critics identified the finale of Game of Thrones, released in 2019, as the end of the monoculture and predicted that media would become fragmented in its viewership going forward. Alison Herman of The Ringer called Game of Thrones "the last vestige of the monoculture". She went on to describe it as "the glaring, currently only, and possibly final exception" to "the fractured, micro-targeted landscape" of media that would take its place, made up of "shows that satisfy every niche" and "perfectly personalized microclimates". Reynolds wrote that the monoculture had not completely disappeared by 2019 but that it "shrunk" and its power was "much weaker", also noting that there were more cult figures than household names.

For The Escapist, Darren Mooney wrote that there had been "a sense of increased fracturing of the monoculture" between 2020 and 2022 due to the differences in the media being widely discussed online, which seemed to have little impact on popular culture, and the media being watched the most, which was not being discussed online. However, Mooney stated that the monoculture had not died and was instead "just resting". In 2023, Elizabeth de Luna of Mashable wrote that the monoculture had become "nearly mythological in the U.S." due to culture being fractured but called the 2023 film Barbie "a veritable monoculture" for its "stunning omnipresence across politics, fashion, social media, news, and music". Also in 2023, Nora Princiotti of The Ringer denoted Taylor Swift and football as "the two largest bastions of monoculture in America".

"Weird Al" Yankovic has commented that the fragmentation of the popular music monoculture has made it more difficult for him to identify songs that are suitable targets for parody. Unlike in the 1980s, when most people were familiar with the same "top hits", it is unlikely that a broad audience would recognize the source material in a parody song today.

== Criticism of the concept ==
For Vox, Kyle Chayka argued that the monoculture was "a Pleasantville image of a lost togetherness that was maybe just an illusion in the first place, or a byproduct of socioeconomic hegemony" wherein pieces of media "became universal by default", and questions whether it has truly disappeared or simply changed. Chayka argues that, in the age of social media, "rather than the monoculture dictated by singular auteurs or industry gatekeepers, we are moving toward a monoculture of the algorithm". In 2011, Steven Hyden, in response to Touré's Salon article, wrote for Salon that the monoculture was a myth, "a fantasy created by myopic critics who willfully misremember the past and project their personal experiences onto a diverse population", and "an illusion created by a flawed, closed-circuit system" that was based on "a utopian concept of cultural 'togetherness' that only ever appeared to exist". The Economist agreed with Hyden, writing that the monoculture "never really existed" and was "a bit of a myth ... [whose] content largely depended on other characteristics of your little corner of the world". Linda Holmes of NPR also called the monoculture a myth that "was always bogus anyway" due to how many people did not consume supposed monocultural touchstones such as Friends or Seinfeld.

== See also ==
- Cultural globalization
- Cultural imperialism
- Cocacolonization
