= Richard W. Bailey =

American linguist (1939–2011)

Richard Weld Bailey (October 26, 1939 – April 2, 2011) was an American linguist, scholar of the English language, and the Fred Newton Scott Collegiate Professor of English at the University of Michigan in Ann Arbor.

Bailey was born in Pontiac, Michigan to Karl and Elisabeth (Weld) Bailey. He graduated from Dartmouth College in 1961, having also studied for a year at the University of Edinburgh. He received his MA and Ph.D in English from the University of Connecticut in 1965. He died in 2011 at his home in Ann Arbor, Michigan.

Bailey was the author or editor of over 20 books, most treating aspects of English language history (in the U.S. and elsewhere) and linguistics. He also authored over one hundred articles, both scholarly and popular and nearly that many reviews of scholarly works. From 2003 to his death, he wrote a regular column titled "Talking About Words" for the University of Michigan publication Michigan Today. With Colette Moore and Marilyn Miller, Bailey published A London Provisioner's Chronicle 1550-1563 by Henry Machyn, an on-line edition of a recounting of daily life in sixteenth century London. Through his teaching and mentorship, he played an important part in advancing scholarship in the realm of language and linguistics, including chairing or serving on dozens of dissertation committees.

In addition to his research and teaching at the University of Michigan, Bailey was involved for over 30 years in the governance and significant growth of the Washtenaw Community College:

- Elected Trustee (1974–present)
- Treasurer (1977–79), Secretary (1979–81)
- Vice-Chair (1981–85), and Board Chair (1985–94, 1999–2000)

He was named an honorary faculty member in 2002 and in 2005, and his service to WCC was honored when the Richard W. Bailey Library was named for him.

In 2008, Bailey co-authored an amicus brief with colleagues Dennis Baron and Jeffrey Kaplan, for the District of Columbia v. Heller Supreme Court case, providing an interpretation of the Second Amendment to the U.S. Constitution based on the grammars, dictionaries, and general usage common in the founders' day, and showing that those meanings are still common today.

== Selected professional affiliations ==
- Modern Language Association - Numerous positions, 1970–2011
- Dictionary Society of North America - President (2001–2003), Fellow (2005–2011)
- American Dialect Society - Vice-President (1985–87), President (1987–89)
- American Council of Learned Societies - Delegate (1996–99; 1999–2003)
- Guild of Scholars of The Episcopal Church - Member 1996–present, President 2003-2007)

== Awards and honors ==
- University of Michigan Distinguished Faculty Achievement Award, 1989
- University of Michigan Regents' Award for Distinguished Public Service, 1992
- University of Michigan Press Book Award, 1993, 1998
- University of Michigan John H. D'Arms Faculty Award for Distinguished Graduate Mentoring in the Humanities, 2001

== Selected publications ==
- Speaking American: A History of English in the United States (Oxford University Press, 2012)
- Rogue Scholar: The Sinister Life and Celebrated Death of Edward H. Rulloff (University of Michigan Press, 2004)
- Images of English: A Cultural History of the English Language (University of Michigan Press, 1991)
- Nineteenth Century English (University of Michigan Press, 1998)
- Associate editor, The Oxford Companion to the English Language (Oxford University Press, 1992) Editor, Dictionaries: The Journal of the Dictionary Society of North America, 1978–1990
