= Kristen Rudisill =

American academic

Kristen D Rudisill
- Born: September 17, 1975 (age 51)
- Education: Bryn Mawr College, University of Chicago Divinity School, University of Texas at Austin
- Occupation: Associate Professor of Popular Culture at Bowling Green State University

Kristen Rudisill (born September 17, 1975) is a tenured Associate Professor of Popular Culture at Bowling Green State University, Research Associate in the South Asia Institute at the School of Oriental and African Studies. and a Fulbright Fellow. Her main research areas are dance, competitions, popular culture, India and Disney. She is working on books about Chennai's contemporary theatre and Indian dance competitions.

== Education ==
Kristen Rudisill completed her B.A. in religion at Bryn Mawr College in 1997. She got her A.M. in the History of Religion at the University of Chicago Divinity School. She completed her Ph.D. in Asian Cultures and Languages at the University of Texas at Austin in 2007–2008. Kristen Rudisill studied Tamil with Dr S Bharathi in Madurai, India and with Martha Selby at the University of Texas at Austin.

== Career ==
=== 2000s ===
In 2002, Kristen Rudisill helped in writing a guide to learning Tamil. She was editor of South Asia Graduate Research Journal for 2002 to 2003. In 2003, she was carrying out research in Chennai, India on Tamil contemporary comedy theatrical dramas. In 2005, Kristen Rudisill was a faculty assistant at The South Asia Summer Language Institute, University of Wisconsin, Madison for the Intermediate Tamil Class. In 2006, Kristen Rudisill presented "Performance of Culture, Performance of Self: the Perfect Tamil Brahmin Marriage" at the 22nd Annual South Asia Conference at the University of California at Berkeley and "Comedic Exclusions: Tamil Political Satire and Serious Indian Drama" presented at the 35th Conference on South Asia at the University of Wisconsin, Madison. On 22–25 March 2007, Kristen Rudisill was the organiser and chair of "Sabhas: Changing the Landscape of Chennai's Music, Dance, and Drama" and presented "Sabha Comedy: Content, Aesthetics, and Patronage" at South Asia Session 10 part of the AAS Annual Meeting at the Boston Marriott Copley Place. In 2007, she received the Graduate Student Professional Development Award from University of Texas in Austin Liberal Arts department. She also began research in modern Tamil theatre and twentieth century dance history.

=== 2010s ===
In September 2010, Kristen Rudisill along with Professor Daniel Shoemaker made keynote presentations at a workshop and conference at Hyderabad, India. In 2012, Kristen Rudisill was undertaking research in India as part of her Fulbright Fellowship at L. V. Prasad Film Institute in Chennai, She gave lectures as part of her Fulbright at the Department of English of Adikavi Nannaya University, Andhra Pradesh. She was also a guest dancer on season 7 of Maanada Mayilada. Kristen Rudisill was involved in protests to stop the demolition of Popular Culture building at Bowling Green State University. In 2013, Kristen Rudisill presented a paper on "Reality Television and the Business of Dance in Chennai, India" at the Labour, Livelihood and Culture: Crafts and Music in the Middle East, South and Central Asia conference at Senate House, London. She helped in the formation of the book Posthumanism. In 2014, Kristen was promoted to associate professor and received tenure.

== Honors and awards ==
Kristen Rudisill won a prize for her thesis "From Darkness into Light: Illuminating the Relationship of Agni and Sita in the Ramakatha" in 1997. She won the Emerging Scholar award from the Association for Asian Performance in 2011. She also received the University Continuing Bruton Fellowship from the University of Texas at Austin in 2006.
