= Frank J. Cosgrove =

American farmer, businessman, and politician

Frank J. Cosgrove (October 22, 1914 – October 19, 1980) was an American farmer, businessman, and politician.

Born in Viola, Wisconsin, Cosgrove was a farmer and then in 1950 was an insurance agent. He was president of the Richland Center Chamber of Commerce. Cosgrove served as town supervisor between 1940 and 1942 and then was supervisor of the Viola Soil Conservation District. In 1959, Cosgrove served in the Wisconsin State Assembly and was a Democrat. In 1961, President John F. Kennedy appointed Cosgrove postmaster of Richland Center, Wisconsin serving until his retirement in 1977. At the time of his death, Cosgrove served on the Richland Center Water Utility Commission.
