= J. Robert Wright =

American historian (1936–2022)

John Robert Wright (October 20, 1936 – January 12, 2022) was an American Episcopal priest and St. Mark's Church in-the-Bowery professor at General Theological Seminary and a church historian. Wright was Professor Emeritus of Ecclesiastical History at the General Theological Seminary in New York City. He was a specialist in patristic studies and an authority on the Anglican Book of Common Prayer and on Russian Orthodox and other icons. He was the longest-tenured faculty member at the General Theological Seminary.

Wright was known for his engagement in ecumenical dialogues between the US Episcopal Church and other churches, particularly the Roman Catholic, Armenian Apostolic, and Russian Orthodox, as well as the Evangelical Lutheran Church in America, the Old Catholics, and the Philippine Independent Church. He was the principal Episcopal author of the Called to Common Mission accord with the Evangelical Lutheran Church in America.

== Early life and education ==
Wright was born on October 20, 1936. He did his undergraduate work at the University of the South in Sewanee and also studied at Oxford University and the Pontifical Institute of Medieval Studies in Toronto.

== Career ==
Wright wrote a history of St. Thomas Church in New York City as well as a history of the church and the English crown in the 14th century, based on his research into the records of Archbishop Walter Reynolds. In 2008, he published a commentary on the Ecclesiastical History by the Venerable Bede.

Wright was the president of the former US Anglican Society and the chaplain, in perpetuity, of the Guild of Scholars of The Episcopal Church. He was the immediate past Historiographer of the Episcopal Church in the US and a member of the advisory board of Project Canterbury. In 2007, he was awarded the Archbishop of Canterbury's Cross of St Augustine for his scholarly contribution to ecumenical dialogue. In 2010, a group of his students presented a prayer book owned by William Reed Huntington to the General Theological Seminary in Wright's honor.

In 2010, as the result of a letter he published in the New York Times, Wright made a lecture tour in Kosovo as the guest of the American University there. As of July 2012, he was completing a study of the (Anglican) Thirty-Nine Articles of Religion with the assistance of his student Daniel Fowler, and his major essay on The Book of Common Prayer was published in the 2013 Wiley-Blackwell Companion to the Anglican Communion.

== Death ==
Wright was hospitalized with pneumonia derived from COVID-19 in late 2021, but was released. He died in his New York City home on January 12, 2022, at the age of 85.

== Honors ==
A festschrift in his honor, One Lord, One Faith, One Baptism: Studies in Christian Ecclesiality and Ecumenism in honor of J. Robert Wright, edited by Marsha L. Dutton and Patrick Terrell Gray, copyedited by Richard Mammana, was published in 2006 by Eerdmans on the occasion of Wright's 70th birthday.
