= Dennis Baron =

American linguist

- Born: May 9, 1944 (age 82)
- Occupation: Professor

Academic background
- Education: Brandeis University (B.A.); Columbia University (M.A.); University of Michigan (PhD)

Academic work
- Discipline: English and linguistics
- Institutions: University of Illinois at Urbana–Champaign
- Website: english.illinois.edu/directory/profile/debaron

Dennis Baron (born May 9, 1944) is a professor of English and linguistics at the University of Illinois at Urbana-Champaign. His research focuses on the technologies of communication; language legislation and linguistic rights; language reform; gender issues in language; language standards and minority languages and dialects; English usage; and the history and present state of the English language.

== Education and professional history ==
Baron received a B.A. from Brandeis University in 1965; an M.A. from Columbia University in 1968; and a Ph.D. in English language and literature from the University of Michigan in 1971. He taught high school English in New York City and in Wayland, Massachusetts. Before joining the faculty at the University of Illinois in 1975, he taught at Eastern Illinois University and at the City College of CUNY. Baron is of both South Asian and Romanian-Jewish descent.

Baron has held a Fulbright Fellowship and a National Endowment for the Humanities Fellowship. He twice chaired the National Council of Teachers of English Committee on Public Language, which gives out the annual Doublespeak and George Orwell Awards; he edited the monograph series Publications of the American Dialect Society, and he has served on professional committees of the Modern Language Association and the Linguistic Society of America.

== Research ==
Baron's most recent work, A Better Pencil: Readers, Writers, and the Digital Revolution, describes people's relationship with computers and the internet describing how the digital revolution influences reading and writing practices, and how the latest technologies differ from what came before. Baron explores the use of computers as writing tools. Both pencils and computers were created for tasks that had nothing to do with writing. Pencils, crafted by woodworkers for marking up their boards, were quickly repurposed by writers and artists. The computer crunched numbers, not words, until writers saw it as the next writing machine. Baron also explores the new genres that the computer has launched: email, the instant message, the web page, the blog, social-networking pages like MySpace and Facebook, and communally generated texts like Urban Dictionary, and YouTube.

In The English-Only Question: An Official Language for Americans?, Baron writes about the philosophical, legal, political, educational, and sociological implications of the English-only movement, tracing the history of American attitudes toward English and minority languages during the past two centuries, and how battles to save English or minority languages have been fought in the press, the schools, the courts, and the legislatures of the country.

In his Guide to Home Language Repair Baron answers the questions that he is most frequently asked about English grammar.

Declining Grammar and Other Essays on the English Vocabulary contains essays about English words, and how they are defined, valued, and discussed. "Language Lore," examines some of the myths and misconceptions that affect attitudes toward language—and towards English in particular. "Language Usage," examines some specific questions of meaning and usage. "Language Trends," examines some controversial trends in English vocabulary, and some developments too new to have received comment before. "Language Politics," treats several aspects of linguistic politics, from special attempts to deal with the ethnic, religious, or sex-specific elements of vocabulary to the broader issues of language both as a reflection of the public consciousness and the U.S. Constitution and as a refuge for the most private forms of expression.

Grammar and Gender traces the history of the sexual biases that exist in the English language and describes past and present efforts to correct these biases by reforming usage and vocabulary.

In Grammar and Good Taste: Reforming the American Language, Baron writes about the history of American language, the development of the concept of Federal English in post-Revolutionary America, the movements for spelling reform, for the creation of a language academy on the model of the French Academy, and the role of the common schools in directing the course of English through grammar instruction.

== Contributions to public discussions of language and technology ==
Baron blogs regularly about communication technology and about language issues on the Web of Language and has written articles on language issues for The New York Times; The Washington Post; the Los Angeles Times; the Chicago Tribune; and other newspapers, on topics such as official English, American resistance to studying foreign languages, and grammar. He has been a columnist for The Chronicle of Higher Education and has written for Inside Higher Ed. Baron has also been quoted as an expert in many articles about language.

Baron has been interviewed on CNN, NPR, the CBC, the BBC, the Voice of America, and other radio and television stations discussing topics ranging from the impact of computers on language, to gender-neutral language, to official English, to slang and profanity.

Baron has been a legal expert witness, interpreting the language of contracts and advertising materials and offering opinions on the readability of documents. Baron was lead author, together with colleagues Richard W. Bailey and Jeffrey Kaplan, of "the Linguists' Brief," an amicus brief in District of Columbia v. Heller before the U.S. Supreme Court, providing an interpretation of the Second Amendment to the U.S. Constitution (the "right to bear arms" amendment) based on the grammars, dictionaries, and general usage common in the founders' day, and showing that those meanings are still common today. The brief was mentioned positively in the dissenting opinion of Justice Stevens, and negatively in Justice Scalia's majority opinion deciding the case.

== Bibliography ==
- Baron, Dennis. 1982. "The Epicene Pronoun: The Word that Failed." American Speech 56 (1981), pp. 83–97.
- Baron, Dennis. 1982. Grammar and Good Taste: Reforming the American Language. New Haven: Yale Univ. Press, pp. x + 263. ISBN 0-300-02799-0.
- Baron, Dennis. 1982. Going Native: The Regeneration of Saxon English. Tuscaloosa: Univ. of Alabama Press, pp. iii + 63. Publication of the American Dialect Society no. 69.
- Baron, Dennis. 1986. Grammar and Gender. New Haven: Yale Univ. Press, pp. ix + 249. ISBN 0-300-03526-8
- Baron, Dennis. 1990. The English-Only Question: An Official Language for Americans? New Haven: Yale Univ. Press, pp. xxi + 226. ISBN 0-300-04852-1.
- Baron, Dennis. 1990. Declining Grammar and Other Essays on the English Vocabulary. Urbana, IL: National Council of Teachers of English, pp. ix + 240. ISBN 0-8141-1073-8.
- Baron, Dennis. 1994. Guide to Home Language Repair. Urbana, IL: National Council of Teachers of English, pp. vii + 165. ISBN 0-8141-1942-5
- Baron, Dennis. 2004. "The President's Reading Lesson." Education Week, Sept. 8, p. 43.
- Baron, Dennis. 2009. A Better Pencil: Readers, Writers, and the Digital Revolution. Oxford and New York: Oxford Univ. Press, pp. xviii + 259. ISBN 978-0-19-538844-2
- Baron, Dennis. 2020. "What's Your Pronoun?: Beyond he & she." Liferight, pp. 304. ISBN 1631496042
