= Fishwick (surname) =

Fishwick is a surname. It is from multiple locations in England, but predominantly from a place now in Preston, Lancashire; other origins are Fishwick in Kingsteignton, Devon, and possibly Fisherwick in Staffordshire. It may also derive from Fishwick in the Scottish Borders.

== People with the surname ==
- Bert Fishwick (1899–1961), English footballer
- Clifford Fishwick (1923–1997), English painter
- David Fishwick (born 1971), English businessman
- Karen Fishwick (born 1990), Scottish actor and musician
- Marshall Fishwick (1923–2006), American scholar and writer
- Tom Fishwick (1876–1950), English cricketer

== See also ==
- Fishwick, Preston, Lancashire, England, see Districts of Preston
- Fishwick, Scottish Borders, Scotland
- John Fishwick & Sons, a bus company
- Fyshwick, a suburb of Canberra, Australia
