= Debora Shuger =

Debora Kuller Shuger (born December 15, 1953) is a literary historian and scholar. She studies early modern, Renaissance, late 16th- and 17th century England. She writes about Tudor-Stuart literature; religious, political, and legal thought; Neo-Latin; and censorship of that period.

== Early life and education ==
Shuger was born in Stuyvesant Town in Manhattan. Before her first birthday, her family moved to Rye, New York, where she lived until 3rd grade, when the family moved again, this time to Armonk, New York. She entered Carleton College as a freshman, married, and moved with her husband to Vanderbilt University, where she earned her B.A. (summa cum laude, 1975), M.A. (1978), and M.A.T. (1978). She earned her PhD from Stanford University (1983). Shuger taught at the University of Michigan and the University of Arkansas before moving to UCLA, where she has been since 1989.

While in college, Shuger married Scott Shuger, who created the Today's Papers column for Slate.com. Scott died in 2002. They had one daughter.

Shuger is the oldest of three sisters. Her parents are Alan Kuller, retired Vice President for real estate of Caldor, and Nancy Schoenbrod Kuller (deceased, 1993), a sculptor and painter.

== Works and interests ==
Although Shuger has written most extensively on religion in early modern England her interests range across a number of fields: Tudor-Stuart devotional poetry and prose, theology and biblical exegesis, legal history, political thought, rhetoric, and life writing (biography, memoirs, diaries, etc.).

She has also studied and written about gender, sexuality, colonialism, Classics, and Shakespeare and has published articles on Spenser, Shakespeare, Sidney, Milton, Donne, Jonson, Middleton, rhetoric, hagiography, and mirrors.

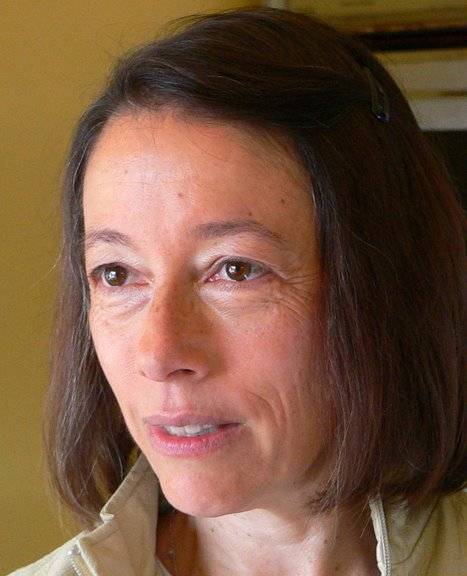
September 2006

She contributed the essay on early Stuart religious literature to the Cambridge History of Early Modern English Literature (2002).

Her recent graduate seminars have focused on political theory from antiquity through the late Middle Ages, 17th century life-writing, Elizabethan religious prose, the sacred literature of the Jacobean era, early modern English law, Saint Augustine, and Renaissance commentaries on Paul's Epistle to the Romans.

Her latest book challenges the assumption that early modern censorship was an instrument used by governmental power to punish dissent. Shuger tries to prove that this is an anachronistic error, and that censorship usually had demonstrably more to do with the prevention of slander than it did with the suppression of popular rights—more to do with civility than with mass mind-control.

Shuger's previous book confronted the longstanding assumption that the English church had been fully complicit with the repressive hegemonic powers of government in this period. Instead, the church was often a key haven for humane resistance to such repression, a place where ideas of social justice could sustain themselves, and as a resource for individual and collective action—to put it as what recent scholarship would deem an oxymoron, it was a benign patriarchy. Political Theologies uses Shakespeare’s Measure for Measure to show that the laws of the church and of the state interacted in ways that modern researchers have overlooked (resulting in a distorted understanding of the play as well as history) by anachronistically imposing our own categories to differentiate moral from administrative questions.

== Honors ==
Shuger has been a resident fellow at the Liguria Study Center for the Arts and Humanities, the National Humanities Center, and the Wissenschaftskolleg zu Berlin, as well as a recipient of Guggenheim, NEH, Huntington Library Mellon Foundation Fellowship, and UC President's fellowships. She is a Fellow of the American Academy of Arts and Sciences.

== Books ==
- Sacred Rhetoric: the Christian grand style in the English Renaissance. Princeton University Press. 1988. ISBN 978-0-691-06736-0.
- Habits of Thought in the English Renaissance: Religion, Politics, and the Dominant Culture. University of Toronto Press. 1990. ISBN 978-0-8020-8047-9.
- The Renaissance Bible: Scholarship, Sacrifice, and Subjectivity. University of California Press. 1994. ISBN 978-0-520-21387-6. Revised edition, Baylor University Press, 2020.
- Religion and Culture in Renaissance England. Cambridge University Press. 1997. ISBN 978-0-521-58425-8. (editor with Claire McEachern)
- Political Theologies in Shakespeare's England: the Sacred and the State in Measure for Measure. Palgrave Macmillan. 2001. ISBN 978-0-333-96501-6.
- Censorship and Cultural Sensibility: the Regulation of Language in Tudor-Stuart England. University of Pennsylvania Press. 2006. ISBN 978-0-8122-0334-9.
- Religion in Early Stuart England, 1603-1638: An Anthology of Primary Source. Baylor University Press. 2012. ISBN 978-1-60258-298-9. (editor)
