= Viola, Wisconsin =

- Village
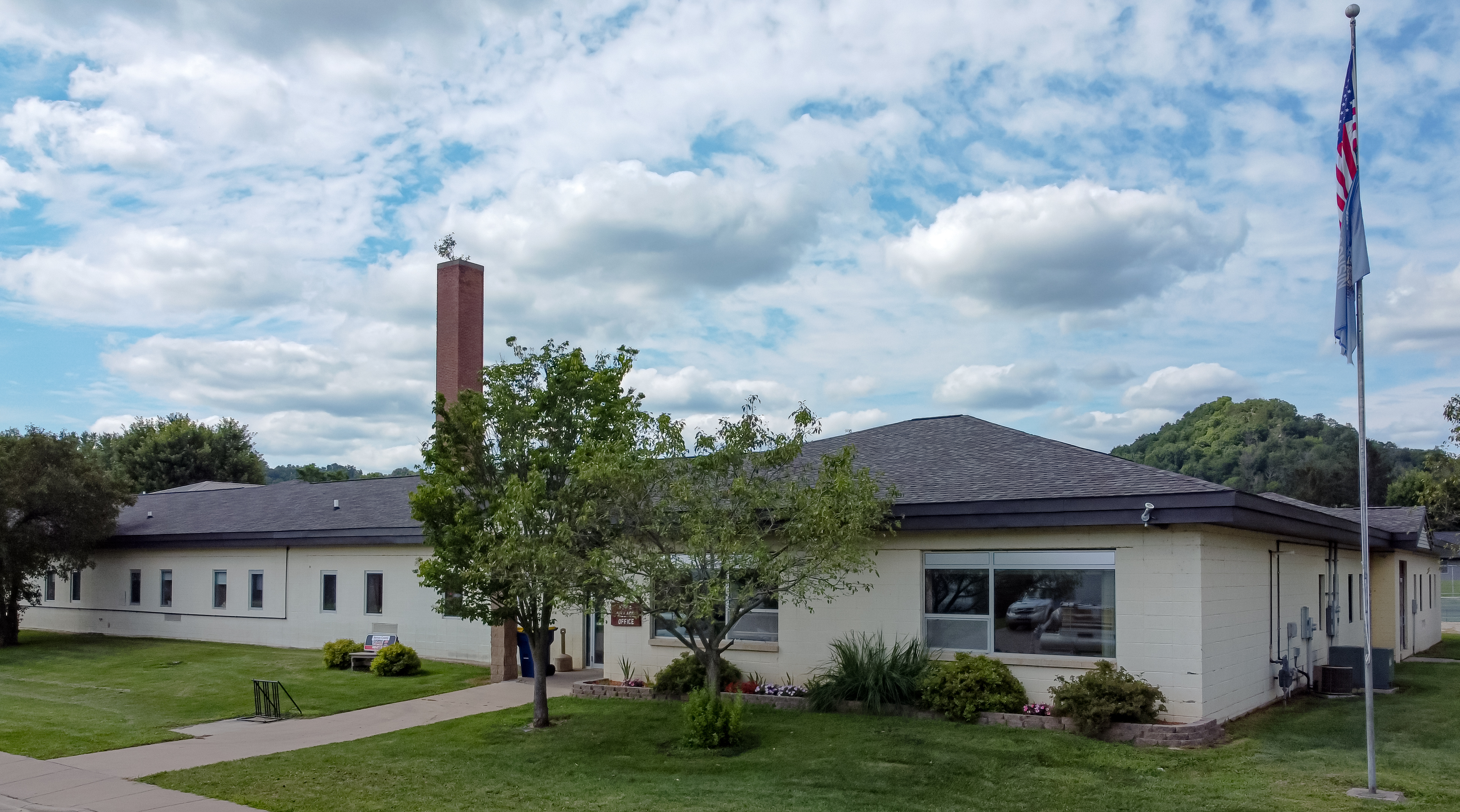
- Village hall

- Location of Viola in Richland (lower right) and Vernon (upper left) counties, Wisconsin.
- Coordinates: 43°30′25″N 90°40′24″W
- Country: United States
- State: Wisconsin
- Counties: Richland, Vernon

Area
  - Total: 1.01 sq mi (2.62 km^{2})
  - Land: 1.00 sq mi (2.58 km^{2})
  - Water: 0.015 sq mi (0.04 km^{2})
- Elevation: 764 ft (233 m)

Population (2020)
  - Total: 676
  - Density: 679/sq mi (262/km^{2})
- Time zone: UTC-6 (Central (CST))
  - Summer (DST): UTC-5 (CDT)
- Area code: 608
- FIPS code: 55-82900
- GNIS feature ID: 1584334
- Website: http://www.vi.viola.wi.gov/

Viola is a village in Richland (mostly) and Vernon counties in the U.S. state of Wisconsin. The population was 676 at the 2020 census. Of this, 436 were in Richland County, and 240 were in Vernon County.

== Geography ==
Viola is located at 43°30′27″N 90°40′13″W (43.507552, -90.670178).

According to the United States Census Bureau, the village has a total area of 1.02 square miles (2.64 km^{2}), of which 1.00 square mile (2.59 km^{2}) is land and 0.02 square miles (0.05 km^{2}) is water. The zip code is 54664.

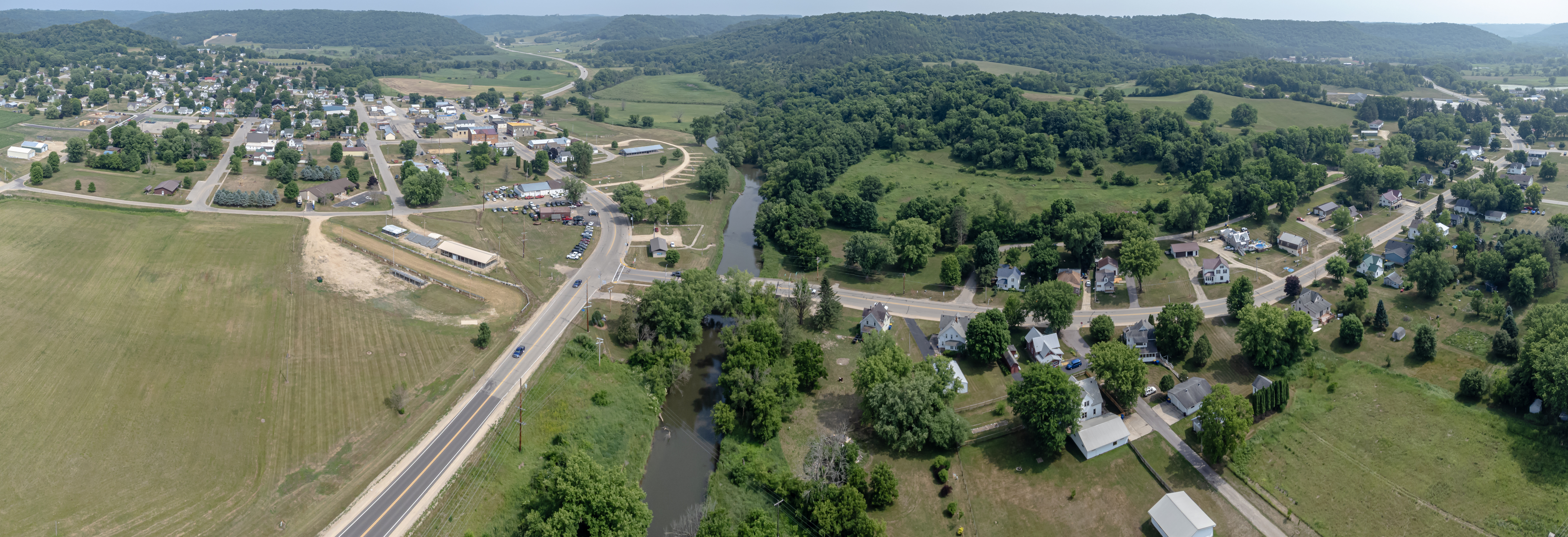
Viola, Wisconsin

== Demographics ==
Historical population
Census	Pop.	Note	%±
1900	432		—
1910	671		55.3%
1920	858		27.9%
1930	699		−18.5%
1940	825		18.0%
1950	785		−4.8%
1960	721		−8.2%
1970	659		−8.6%
1980	696		5.6%
1990	644		−7.5%
2000	667		3.6%
2010	699		4.8%
2020	676		−3.3%
U.S. Decennial Census

=== 2010 census ===
As of the census of 2010, there were 699 people, 279 households, and 184 families living in the village. The population density was 699.0 inhabitants per square mile (269.9/km^{2}). There were 331 housing units at an average density of 331.0 per square mile (127.8/km^{2}). The racial makeup of the village was 98.6% White, 0.6% African American, 0.3% from other races, and 0.6% from two or more races. Hispanic or Latino of any race were 0.6% of the population.

There were 279 households, of which 30.8% had children under the age of 18 living with them, 50.2% were married couples living together, 11.5% had a female householder with no husband present, 4.3% had a male householder with no wife present, and 34.1% were non-families. 27.2% of all households were made up of individuals, and 13.3% had someone living alone who was 65 years of age or older. The average household size was 2.51 and the average family size was 3.06.

The median age in the village was 37.8 years. 27.2% of residents were under the age of 18; 7.7% were between the ages of 18 and 24; 23% were from 25 to 44; 25.1% were from 45 to 64; and 16.9% were 65 years of age or older. The gender makeup of the village was 47.9% male and 52.1% female.

=== 2000 census ===
As of the census of 2000, there were 667 people, 290 households, and 185 families living in the village. The population density was 632.9 people per square mile (245.3/km^{2}). There were 319 housing units at an average density of 302.7 per square mile (117.3/km^{2}). The racial makeup of the village was 98.95% White, 0.15% Native American, 0.30% Asian, 0.15% from other races, and 0.45% from two or more races. Hispanic or Latino of any race were 1.20% of the population.

There were 290 households, out of which 24.8% had children under the age of 18 living with them, 49.7% were married couples living together, 9.7% had a female householder with no husband present, and 35.9% were non-families. 31.0% of all households were made up of individuals, and 16.9% had someone living alone who was 65 years of age or older. The average household size was 2.30 and the average family size was 2.88.

In the village, the population was spread out, with 22.0% under the age of 18, 8.4% from 18 to 24, 23.7% from 25 to 44, 24.0% from 45 to 64, and 21.9% who were 65 years of age or older. The median age was 43 years. For every 100 females, there were 92.8 males. For every 100 females age 18 and over, there were 85.7 males.

The median income for a household in the village was $28,068, and the median income for a family was $34,286. Males had a median income of $28,583 versus $17,188 for females. The per capita income for the village was $17,265. About 12.9% of families and 16.9% of the population were below the poverty line, including 27.5% of those under age 18 and 9.4% of those age 65 or over.

== Education ==
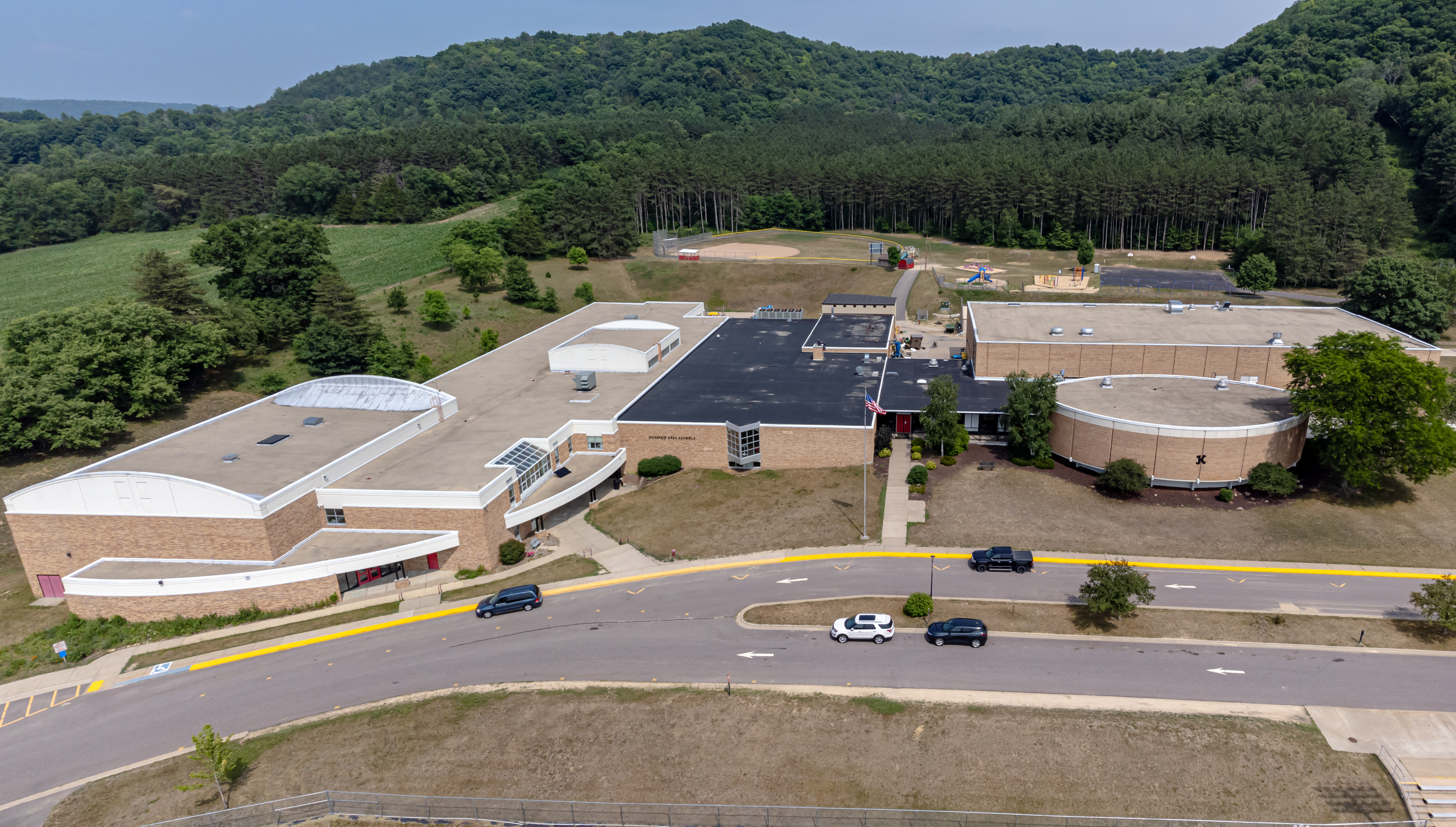
Kickapoo Area Schools

- The Kickapoo High School is the local public high school.

== Notable people ==
- Frank J. Cosgrove, Wisconsin politician, farmer, and businessman, was born in Viola.
- Robert H. DeLap, Wisconsin politician, soldier, and physician, lived in Viola.
- Russel B. Nye, educator, historian and 1945 Pulitzer Prize-winning author, was born in Viola.

== Gallery ==
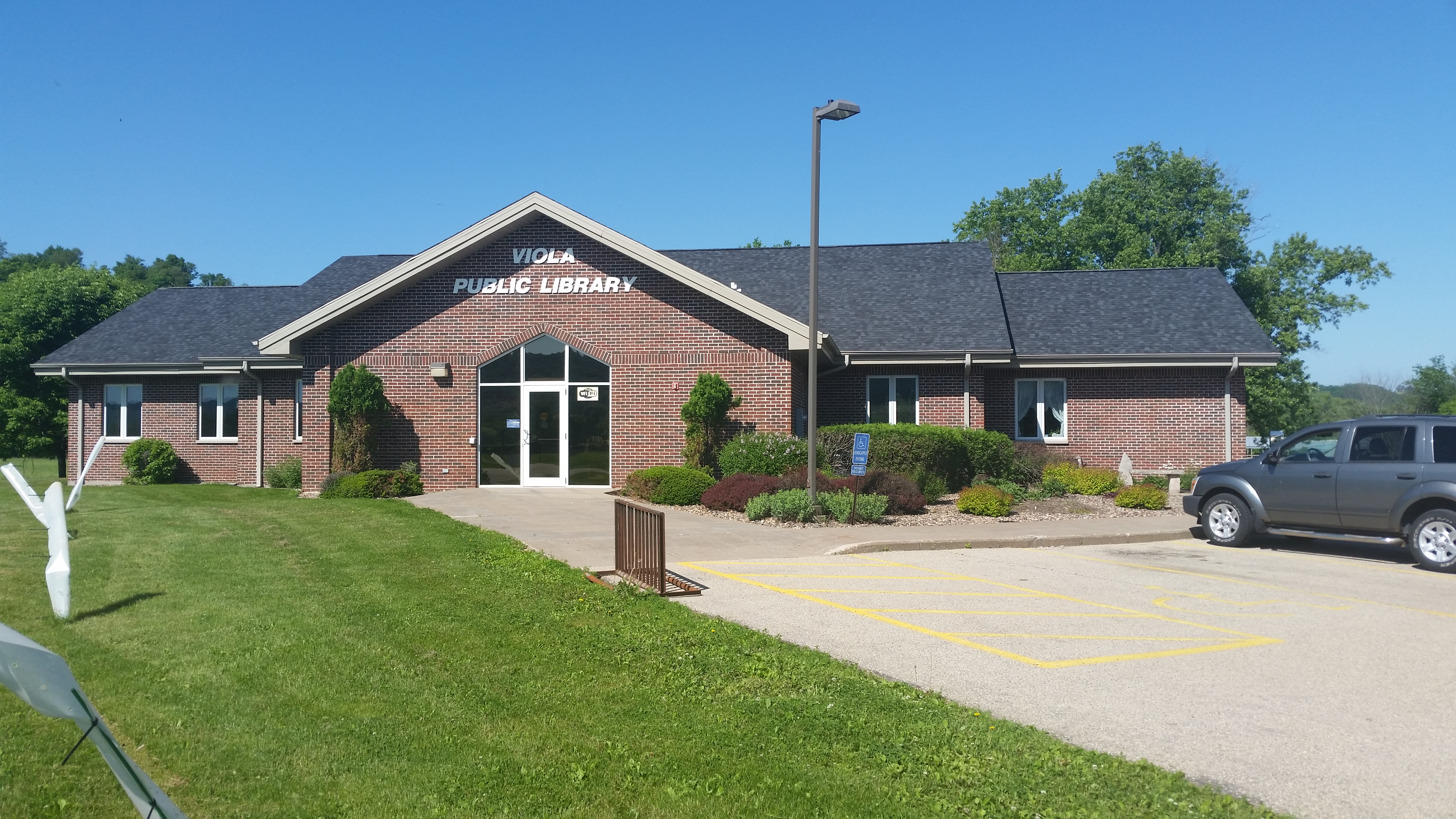
Viola Public Library

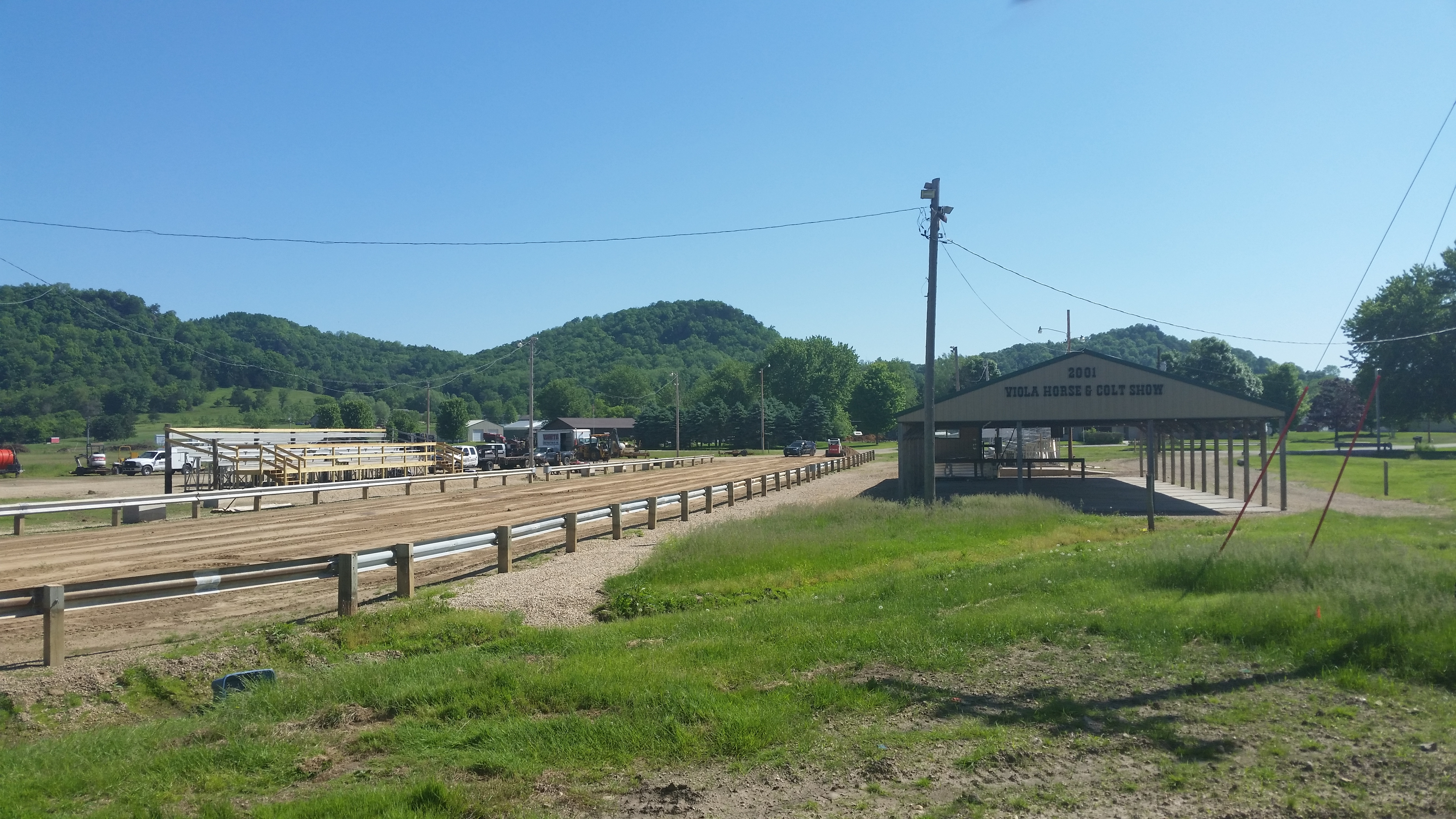
truck & tractor pulling facility

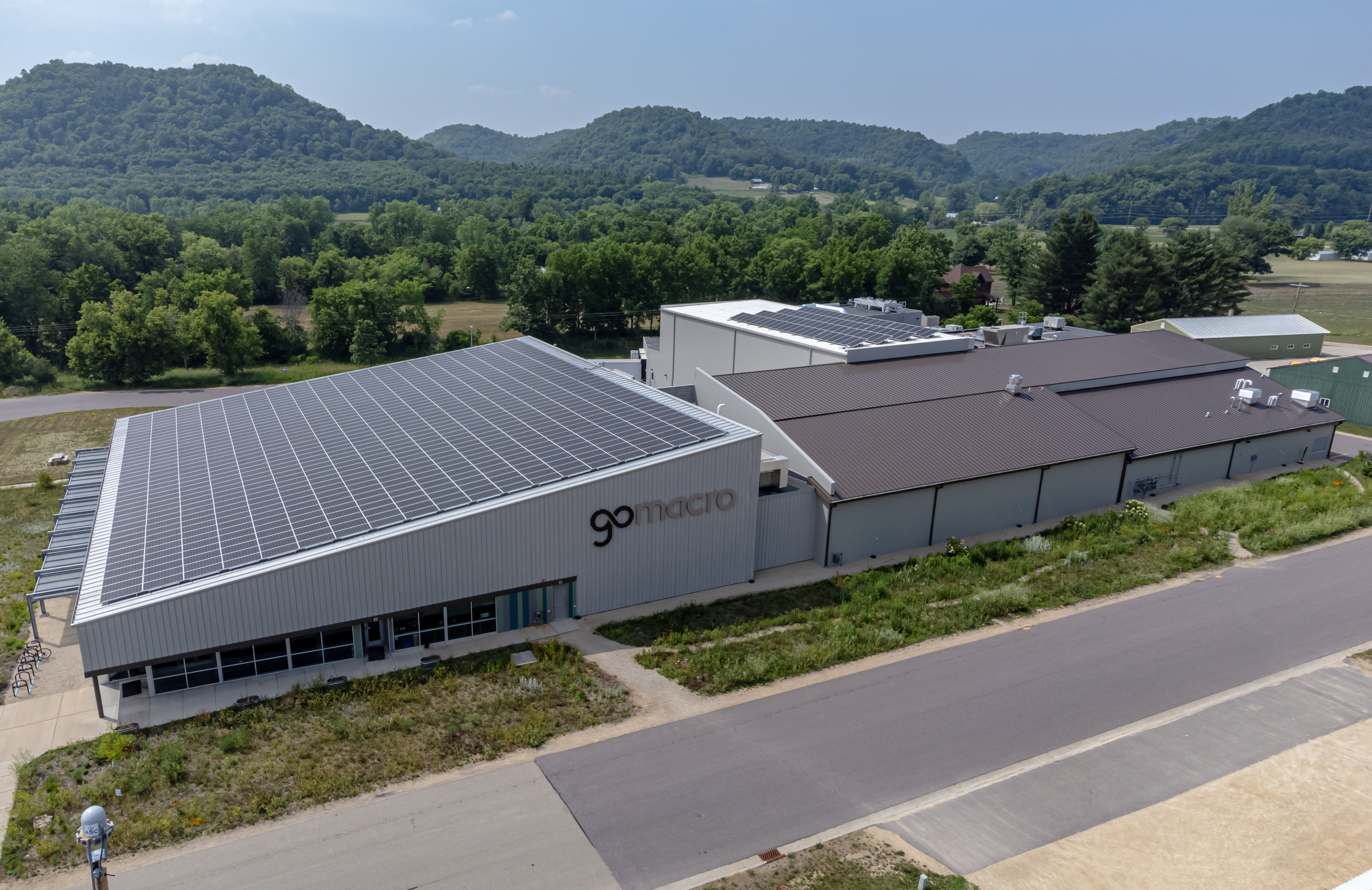
GoMacro in Viola

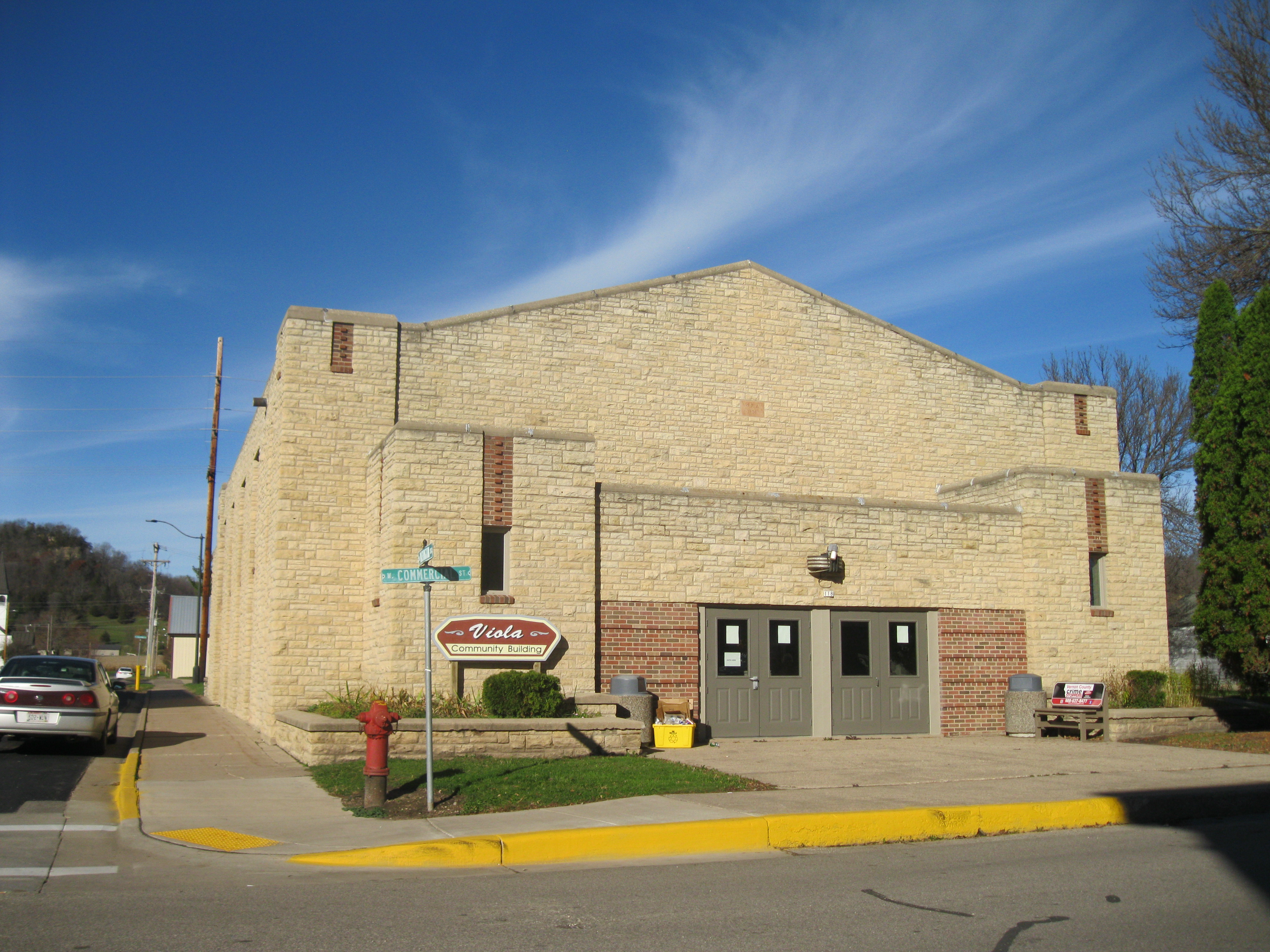
Viola Community Center
