= The Journal of Popular Culture =

- Discipline: Culture
- Language: English
- Edited by: Ann E. Larabee

Publication details
- History: 1968–present
- Publisher: Wiley-Blackwell (USA)
- Frequency: Bimonthly
- Impact factor: 0.199 (2019)

Standard abbreviations
- ISO 4: J. Pop. Cult.

Indexing
- ISSN: 0022-3840 (print); 1540-5931 (web)
- LCCN: sf80000702
- OCLC no.: 1754751

Links
- Journal homepage; Online archive

The Journal of Popular Culture (JPC) is a peer-reviewed academic journal that publishes academic essays on all aspects of popular or mass culture. It is published six times a year, printed by Wiley-Blackwell. As of Summer 2022, the editor is Novotny Lawrence. One of the cofounders was Jack Fritscher.

The JPC is the official publication of the Popular Culture Association. The organization holds a national conference annually, usually within the continental United States, with the American Culture Association. There are also several regional conferences held annually.

The Journal of Popular Culture began publication in 1967. At the time, it was located at Bowling Green State University and edited by Ray B. Browne. It later became headquartered at Michigan State University in East Lansing, Michigan.

== Abstracting and indexing ==
The journal is abstracted and indexed in:

- Academic Search Premier
- Arts and Humanities Citation Index
- MLA International Bibliography
- ProQuest Central
- SocIndex
- Web of Science

According to the Journal Citation Reports, the journal has a 2019 impact factor of 0.199.
