= Scott Shuger =

American journalist

Scott Thaman Shuger (1952, Baltimore - 15 June 2002) was a pioneering Internet journalist who wrote the popular column Today's Papers, which summarized the top headlines in U.S. newspapers, for the online magazine Slate. He wrote the daily feature from 1997 until September 2001, at which point he became Slate's chief writer on terrorism.

In June 2002, Shuger died of a heart attack while diving off the coast of California. He was 50 years old.
