= Popular culture =

Widespread norms in a society

Popular culture (also called pop culture or mass culture) is generally recognized by members of a society as a set of practices, beliefs, artistic output (also known as popular art [cf. pop art] or mass art, sometimes contrasted with fine art) and objects that are dominant or prevalent in a society at a given point in time. Popular culture also encompasses the activities and feelings produced as a result of interaction with these dominant objects. Mass media, marketing, and the imperatives of mass appeal within capitalism constitute the primary engines of Western popular culture—a system philosopher Theodor Adorno critically termed the 'culture industry'.

Heavily influenced in modern times (after World War Two) by mass media, this collection of ideas permeates the everyday lives of people in a given society. Therefore, popular culture exerts a significant influence on an individual's attitudes towards certain topics. However, there are various ways to define pop culture. Because of this, popular culture is something that can be defined in a variety of conflicting ways by different people across different contexts. It is generally viewed in contrast to other forms of culture, such as folk culture, working-class culture, or high culture, and also from different academic perspectives, including psychoanalysis, structuralism, postmodernism, and more.

== History ==
In the past, folk culture functioned analogously to the popular culture of the masses and of the nations.

The phrase popular culture was coined in the 19th century or earlier. Traditionally, popular culture was associated with poor education and with the lower classes, as opposed to the "official culture" and higher education of the upper classes. With the rise of the Industrial Revolution in the eighteenth and nineteenth centuries, Britain experienced social changes that resulted in increased literacy rates, and with the rise of capitalism and industrialization, people began to spend more money on entertainment, such as (commercialised) public houses and sports. Reading also gained traction. Labeling penny dreadfuls the Victorian equivalent of video games, The Guardian in 2016 described penny fiction as "Britain's first taste of mass-produced popular culture for the young". A growing consumer culture and an increased capacity for travel via the newly invented railway (the first public railway, Stockton and Darlington Railway, opened in north-east England in 1825) created both a market for cheap popular literature and the ability for its distribution on a large scale. The first penny serials were published in the 1830s to meet the growing demand.

The stress on the distinction from "official culture" became more pronounced towards the end of the 19th century, a usage that became established by the interbellum period.

From the end of World War II, following major cultural and social changes brought by mass media innovations, the meaning of popular culture began to overlap with the connotations of mass culture, media culture, image culture, consumer culture, and culture for mass consumption.

The abbreviated form pop, as in pop music, dates from the late 1950s. Although the terms pop and popular are in some cases used interchangeably, and their meaning partially overlap, the term pop is narrower. Pop is specific to something containing qualities of mass appeal, while popular refers to what has gained popularity, regardless of its style.

=== Global pop culture influences ===
==== Japanese pop culture influence ====
In the 1970s, Japan's post-World War II "liberated" nationalism yielded a cultural shift that started a movement towards technological and financial innovation. Over time, this techno-nationalism produced global phenomena such as Sony and Matsushita (now Panasonic)'s software in Hollywood Studios, the Walkman, large-scale advertisements, and more.

This movement also created the kawaii culture. Kawaii was first introduced into popular vernacular in 1914 by Tamaki Kishi in an advertisement for her feminine, chic boutique. Since then, it has slowly taken on a life of its own as the word used to describe all things cute, adorable, or lovable and is widely intertwined with aspects of Japanese culture, especially characters such as manga icons, Pokémon, and, most notably, Hello Kitty. This "cult of cute", fronted by companies such as Sanrio and Nintendo, appealed to large audiences that spread to East Asia and the West. Today, kawaii culture has a major impact on popular culture worldwide.

== Definition ==
According to author John Storey, there are various definitions of popular culture. The quantitative definition of culture has the problem that too much "high culture" (e.g., television dramatizations of Jane Austen) is also "popular". "Pop culture" is also defined as the culture that is "leftover" when we have decided what high culture is. However, many works straddle the boundaries, e.g., William Shakespeare and Charles Dickens, Leo Tolstoy, and George Orwell.

A third definition equates pop culture with "mass culture" and ideas. This is seen as a commercial culture, mass-produced for mass consumption by mass media. From a Western European perspective, this may be compared to American culture. Alternatively, "pop culture" can be defined as an "authentic" culture of the people, but this can be problematic as there are many ways of defining the "people". Storey argued that there is a political dimension to popular culture; neo-Gramscian hegemony theory "sees popular culture as a site of struggle between the 'resistance' of subordinate groups in society and the forces of 'incorporation' operating in the interests of dominant groups in society". A postmodernist approach to popular culture would "no longer recognize the distinction between high and popular culture".

Storey claims that popular culture emerged from the urbanization of the Industrial Revolution. Studies of Shakespeare (by Weimann, Barber, or Bristol, for example) locate much of the characteristic vitality of his drama in its participation in Renaissance popular culture, while contemporary practitioners like Dario Fo and John McGrath use popular culture in its Gramscian sense that includes ancient folk traditions (the commedia dell'arte for example).

Popular culture is constantly evolving and occurs uniquely in place and time. It forms currents and eddies, and represents a complex of mutually interdependent perspectives and values that influence society and its institutions in various ways. For example, certain currents of pop culture may originate from, (or diverge into) a subculture, representing perspectives with which the mainstream popular culture has only limited familiarity. Items of popular culture most typically appeal to a broad spectrum of the public. Important contemporary contributions to understanding what popular culture means have been given by the German researcher Ronald Daus, who studies the impact of extra-European cultures in North America, Asia, and especially in Latin America.

=== Levels ===
Within the realm of popular culture, there exists an organizational culture. From its beginning, popular culture has revolved around classes in society and the push-back between them. Within popular culture, there are two levels that have emerged, high and low. High culture can be described as art and works considered of superior value, historically, aesthetically and socially. Low culture is regarded by some as that of the lower classes, historically.

=== Folklore ===
Adaptations based on traditional folklore provide a source of popular culture. This early layer of cultural mainstream still persists today, in a form separate from mass-produced popular culture, propagating by word of mouth rather than via mass media, e.g. in the form of jokes or urban legends. With the widespread use of the Internet from the 1990s, the distinction between mass media and word-of-mouth has become blurred.

Although the folkloric element of popular culture engages heavily with the commercial element, communities amongst the public have their own tastes and they may not always embrace every cultural or subcultural item sold. Moreover, certain beliefs and opinions about the products of commercial culture may spread by word-of-mouth, and become modified in the process and in the same manner that folklore evolves.

== Criticism ==
Western popular culture stands persistently accused of functioning as a vast engine of commercialism. This system, critics argue, is designed to privilege products selected and mass-marketed by capitalists. Such criticisms find articulation in the works of Marxist theorists—including luminaries like Herbert Marcuse, Theodor Adorno, Max Horkheimer, bell hooks, Antonio Gramsci, Guy Debord, Fredric Jameson, Terry Eagleton—as well as postmodern philosophers such as Jean-François Lyotard (who dissected the commercialization of information under capitalism).

=== Frankfurt School ===
The Frankfurt School, particularly Theodor Adorno and Max Horkheimer, delivered critiques through their concept of the "culture industry," explored in their seminal Dialectic of Enlightenment. Drawing from Kant, Marx, Nietzsche, and others, they argued that capitalist popular culture is far from an authentic expression of the people. Instead, it constitutes a system churning out homogenous, standardized products, manufactured to serve the interests of elite domination. Consumer desire for Hollywood films, pop melodies, and disposable bestsellers is not organic, but shaped by the capitalist behemoths—Hollywood studios, record labels, publishing giants—and the elite gatekeepers who dictate which commodities saturate our media, from television screens to print journalism. As Adorno noted, "The industry bows to the vote it has itself rigged". This elite dictates commodification based on narrow ideological values, habituating audiences to formulaic conventions that, Adorno contended, stifle genuine intellectual engagement. His work influenced cultural studies, philosophy, and the New Left.

=== Contemporary critique ===
The digital age, as music critic Alex Ross observed in New Yorker (2014), has only magnified Adorno's relevance. The success of phenomena like the Harry Potter franchise, as critiqued by Jack Zipes, exemplifies this mass commercialization and corporate hegemony. Zipes contends that culture industry commodities achieve "popularity" precisely through their homogeneity and adherence to formula. The media, he argues, actively molds children's tastes. Postmodern sociologist Jean Baudrillard presented a stark view of the consumer's role. He argued that individuals are relentlessly conditioned to pursue the maximization of pleasure as a social duty – a failure to participate risks rendering one asocial. His core critique held that products of capitalist culture, especially those marketed as rebellious, can only offer an illusion of defiance. True rebellion is impossible because the system producing these commodities remains firmly controlled by the powerful.

Scholarship demonstrates how Western entertainment industries fortify transnational capitalism and cement Western cultural dominance. Consequently, commercial entertainment is less an authentic local expression and more a culture amplified by transnational media conglomerates, leading to an homogenization of cultural identities, eroding diverse traditions in favor of marketable forms. These conglomerates—vast media empires controlling music labels, film studios, streaming platforms, and news outlets—are often answerable primarily to shareholders demanding ever-increasing returns. This shareholder primacy incentivizes cost-cutting and profit maximization at the expense of ethical considerations, including fair artist compensation beyond the top tier, safe working conditions, and sustainable sourcing. The advertising revenue that underpins "free" platforms like YouTube, Instagram, and Spotify, crucial for promoting stars, is generated through sophisticated surveillance and data extraction, commodifying user attention and privacy on an unprecedented scale.

=== Corporate exploitation ===
The culture industry not only standardizes taste but also obscures a foundation of global exploitation, resource plunder, and the relentless pursuit of shareholder value above human dignity and ecological sustainability. The system is structured so that the vast majority of revenue flows upwards: to platform owners, shareholders, and executives. The success of celebrities becomes a powerful marketing tool for the conglomerate itself, boosting its stock price and attracting investment. The devices essential for consuming this culture often rely on minerals mined under terrible conditions. Cobalt and tantalum, critical for electronics, are frequently sourced from mines in the Democratic Republic of Congo using child labour and artisanal miners facing hazards and exploitation, generating profits for multinational conglomerates further up the supply chain.

=== Feminist critique ===
The influential feminist scholar bell hooks delivers a searing intersectional critique. She argues that commercial celebrities and their branded commodities cannot authentically symbolize liberation while being structurally dependent on – and actively reinforcing – imperialist capitalism and oppressive beauty standards. Hooks dissects figures like Beyoncé not merely as artists, but as nodes within a vast profit machinery: her global stardom increases the wealth of corporate giants (Pepsi, Adidas), luxury brands (her Ivy Park brand), and the extractive ad-revenue engines of platforms like Spotify and Apple Music. Beyoncé's ascent to billionaire status, hooks contends, exemplifies how such success is built upon and fuels the very systems of patriarchal capitalism it might superficially appear to challenge. Her power derives from, and legitimizes, the industries profiting from exploitation.

=== Media critique ===
The very structure of mass media facilitates control, as Edward S. Herman and Noam Chomsky argued in their pivotal 1988 work, Manufacturing Consent: The Political Economy of the Mass Media. They posit that a powerful elite, driven by its own interests, controls and manipulates mainstream information flow. Mass media, therefore, operates as a sophisticated system of propaganda:

In sum, a propaganda approach to media coverage suggests a systematic and highly political dichotomization in news coverage based on serviceability to important domestic power interests. This should be observable in dichotomized choices of story and in the volume and quality of coverage... such dichotomization in the mass media is massive and systematic: not only are choices for publicity and suppression comprehensible in terms of system advantage, but the modes of handling favored and inconvenient materials (placement, tone, context, fullness of treatment) differ in ways that serve political ends.

Popular culture has frequently served as a vehicle for imperialist ideologies. John M. MacKenzie highlights how many such products were crafted to glorify the British upper classes and promote imperialist worldviews, rather than reflecting a democratic perspective.

== Sources ==
=== Print culture ===
With the invention of the printing press in the sixteenth century, mass-produced, cheap books, pamphlets and periodicals became widely available to the public. With this, the transmission of common knowledge and ideas was possible.

=== Radio culture ===
In the 1890s, Nikola Tesla and Guglielmo Marconi created the radiotelegraph, allowing for the modern radio to be born. This led to the radio being able to influence a more "listened-to" culture, with individuals being able to feel like they have a more direct impact. This radio culture is vital, because it was imperative to advertising, and it introduced the commercial.

=== Films ===
Films and cinema are highly influential to popular culture, as films as an art form are what people seem to respond to the most. With moving pictures being first captured by Eadweard Muybridge in 1877, films have evolved into elements that can be cast into different digital formats, spreading to different cultures.

The impact of films and cinema are most evident when analyzing in the search of what the films aim to portray. Films are used to seek acceptance and understanding of many subjects because of the influence the films carry—an example of an early representation of this can be seen in Casablanca (1942): the film introduced war subjects to the public after the United States entered World War II, and it meant to increase pro-war sentiment for the allies. Films are a known massive influencer to popular culture yet not all films create a movement that contributes enough to be part of the popular culture that starts movements. The content must resonate to most of the public so the knowledge in the material connects with the majority. Popular culture is a set of beliefs in trends and entail to change a person's set of ideologies and create social transformation. The beliefs are still a trend that change more rapidly in the modern age that carries a continuation of outpouring media and more specifically films. The trend does not last but it also carries a different effect based on individuals that can be grouped to generalized groups based on age and education. The creation of culture by films is seen in fandoms, religions, ideologies, and movements. The culture of film is more evident through social media. Social media is an instant source of feedback and creates discussion on films. A repeating event that has been set in modern culture within the trend setting phase is the creation of movements in social media platforms to defend a featured subject on a film.

Popular culture, or mass culture, is reached easily with films which are easily shared and reached worldwide.

=== Television programs ===
A television program is a segment of audiovisual content intended for broadcast (other than a commercial, trailer, or other content not serving as attraction for viewership).

Television programs may be fictional (as in comedies and dramas), or non-fictional (as in documentary, light entertainment, news and reality television). They may be topical (as in the case of a local newscast and some made-for-television movies), or historical (as in the case of many documentaries and fictional series). They can be primarily instructional or educational, or entertaining as is the case in situation comedy and game shows.

=== Music ===
Popular music is music with wide appeal that is typically distributed to large audiences through the music industry. These forms and styles can be enjoyed and performed by people with little or no musical training. It stands in contrast to both art music and traditional or "folk" music. Art music was historically disseminated through the performances of written music, although since the beginning of the recording industry, it is also disseminated through recordings. Traditional music forms such as early blues songs or hymns were passed along orally, or to smaller, local audiences.

=== Sports ===
Sports include all forms of competitive physical activity or games which, through casual or organized participation, aim to use, maintain or improve physical ability and skills while providing enjoyment to participants, and in some cases, entertainment for spectators. The connection between sports and popular culture is significant in recent times because there is an influx of sport history to keep track of, as sports journalists produce quality pieces, more sports museums are developed, and there are various radio, film, and television documentaries. Sport history has embraced popular culture as it has expanded its horizons on elite athletes and governing bodies, to the study of every day activities. It has broadened its perspective by connecting sports and athletes with class, gender, ethnicity, and disability. Sports are becoming more popular in the eyes of society, and impacting human culture as they get more invested in the game, and perhaps even play the sports themselves in their neighborhoods. Museums also show sports as popular culture, such as Stuart Clarke's "The Homes of Football" photographic collection in the National Football Museum.

=== Corporate branding ===
Corporate branding refers to the practice of promoting the brand name of a corporate entity, as opposed to specific products or services.

=== Personal branding ===
Personal branding includes the use of social media to promotion to brands and topics to further good repute among professionals in a given field, produce an iconic relationship between a professional, a brand and its audience that extends networks past the conventional lines established by the mainstream and to enhance personal visibility. Popular culture: is generally recognized by members of a society as a set of the practices, beliefs, and objects that are dominant or prevalent in a society at a given point in time. As celebrities online identities are extremely important in order to create a brand to line-up sponsorships, jobs, and opportunities. As influencers, micro-celebrities, and users constantly need to find new ways to be unique or stay updated with trends, in order to maintain followers, views, and likes. For example, Ellen DeGeneres has created her own personal branding through her talk show The Ellen DeGeneres Show. As she developed her brand we can see the branches she created to extend her fan base such as Ellen clothing, socks, pet beds, and more.

=== Social media ===
Social media is interactive computer-mediated technologies that facilitate the creation or sharing of information, ideas, career interests and other forms of expression via virtual communities and networks. Social media platforms such as Instagram, Facebook, Twitter, YouTube, Pinterest, TikTok and Snapchat are the most popular applications used on a daily basis by younger generations. Social media tends to be implemented into the daily routine of individuals in our current society. Social media is a vital part of our culture as it continues to impact the forms of communication used to connect with those in our communities, families, or friend groups. We often see that terms or slang are used online that is not used in face-to-face conversations, thus, adding to a persona users create through the screens of technology. For example, some individuals respond to situations with a hashtag or emojis.

Social media influencers have become trendsetters through their direct engagement with large audiences, upending conventional marketing and advertising techniques. Consumer purchase choices have been impacted by fashion partnerships, sponsored material and outfit ideas offered by influencers. Social media has also made fashion more accessible by fostering uniqueness, expanding the depiction of trends, and facilitating the rise of niche influencers. The influencer-driven fashion industry, nevertheless, has also come under fire for encouraging excessive consumerism, inflated beauty ideals, and labour exploitation.

== Influences ==
Pop culture has had a lasting influence to the products being released in their time. Many examples of art, books, films and others, have been inspired by pop culture. These include:

=== Pop art ===
Pop art is an art movement that first emerged in the 1950s as a reaction and a counter to traditional and high-class art by including common and well-known images and references. Artists known during this movement include Eduardo Paolozzi, Richard Hamilton, Larry Rivers, Robert Rauschenberg and Andy Warhol.

=== Pop music ===
Pop music is a wide-ranging genre of music whose characteristics include styles and tones that have a wider and more massive appeal to all kinds of consumers. Oftentimes, many examples of these music contain influences from other pre-existing works. The origins of popular music began in the late 1800s with the inventions of Edison's phonograph and Berliner's gramophone, both of which allowed for music to be available for purchase to the public rather than access to just the elites. Due to the almost nonexistent copyright laws, the early 1900s flourished with composers and publishers aiming to make and sell as much music as they could. The hub for this activity was a small area of New York known as Tin Pan Alley, which quickly became one of the major spots for popular music as the demand grew intensely. Technological advances in the 1940s only furthered the success and popularity of the genre. The reel-to-tape recorder was groundbreaking in terms of innovation and served as the baseline for many more transformations this genre and the music industry as a whole will endure. Along with the continued innovation of popular music, multiple subset genres emerged as the new faces of popular music, all with the foundation of jazz and blues. Some of those genres include Rock and Roll, Punk, and Hip Hop. Due to the increasing mainstream success of popular music, artists of the genre grew in fame and popularity. A few of the major singers and musicians of this genre include Michael Jackson, Madonna, Britney Spears, Christina Aguilera, Jennifer Lopez, Justin Bieber, Elvis Presley, Beatles, Beyoncé, Katy Perry, and Taylor Swift. Popular music will continue to be shaped by, and evolve to fit the tastes and preferences of the public.

=== Pop culture fiction ===
Pop culture fiction is a genre in books, comics, films, shows, and many other story-telling media that depicts stories that are purposely filled with easter eggs and references to pop culture. The genre often overlaps with satire and parody, but the most-well known are considered to be more serious works of literature. Writers of this genre include Ernest Cline, Bret Easton Ellis, and Bryan Lee O'Malley.

=== Pop culture studies ===
Pop culture studies are researches thesis, and other academic works that analyzes various trends of pop and mass culture, pop icons, or the effects and influences of pop culture in society and history. Ray B. Browne is one of the first academicians to conduct courses on the studies about pop culture.

== See also ==
- Monoculture (popular culture) – Concept of popular culture being experienced globally
- Culture industry – Commercial mass marketing of culture
- Fads – Collective behavior that achieves short-lived popularity
- Fine art – Art developed primarily for aesthetics
- Korean Wave – Global rise in popularity of Korean culture
- The Journal of Popular Culture
- Underground culture – Alternative cultures that differ from the mainstream
  - Lowbrow – Underground visual art movement
- MTV Generation – Adolescents during the 1980s through 1990s
- Pop icon – Iconic person or object in popular culture
- Celebrity influence in politics
