= Popular culture studies =

Academic discipline

Popular culture studies is the study of popular culture from a critical theory perspective combining communication studies and cultural studies. The first institution to offer bachelor's and master's degrees in Popular Culture is the Bowling Green State University Department of Popular Culture founded by Ray B. Browne.

== See also ==
- Buffy studies
- Madonna studies
- Tolkien research
