= Murrell Dobbins Career and Technical Education High School =

- Murrell Dobbins Career & Technical Education High School
- U.S. National Register of Historic Places
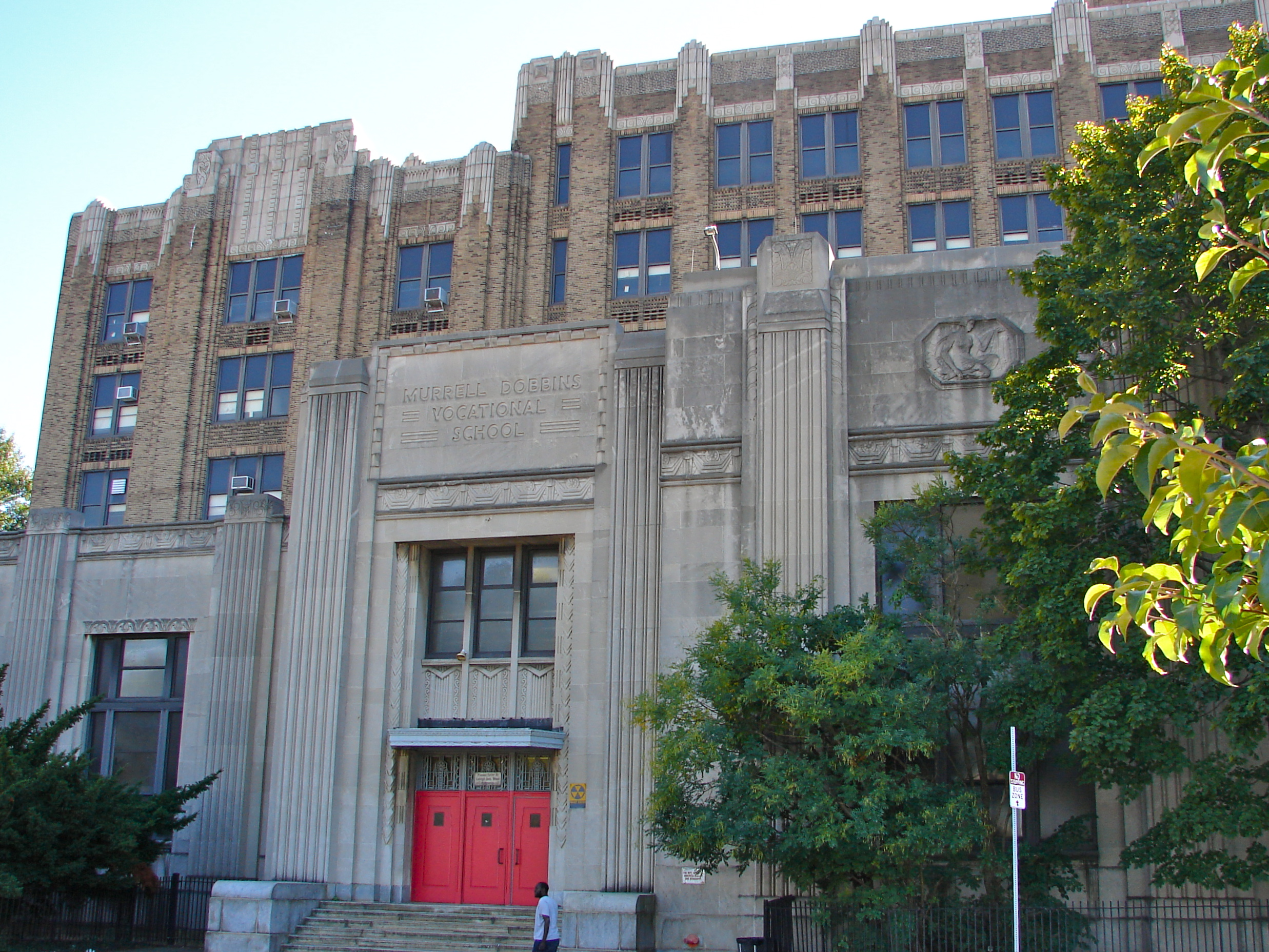
- Murrell Dobbins Career & Technical Education High School, September 2010

- Location within Philadelphia Location within Pennsylvania Location within the United States
- Location: 2150 West Lehigh Ave., Philadelphia, Pennsylvania, U.S.
- Coordinates: 39°59′42″N 75°10′01″W
- Area: 2 acres (0.81 ha)
- Built: 1936–1937
- Architect: Irwin T. Catharine
- Architectural style: Moderne, Art Deco
- MPS: Philadelphia Public Schools TR
- NRHP reference No.: 88002263
- Added to NRHP: November 18, 1988

Murrell Dobbins Career & Technical Education High School, also known as Murrell Dobbins Vocational High School, is a historic vocational school building located in the West Lehigh neighborhood of North Philadelphia, Pennsylvania, United States. It is part of the School District of Philadelphia. The building was designed by Irwin T. Catharine and built between 1936–1937. It is a six- to seven-story, 14-bay, brick building in the Moderne-style. It has a one-story, stone front building. It features brick piers with terracotta tops and the building has terra cotta trim.

The school is the home of the Mustangs and the school colors are Flame and Steel. Murrell Dobbins offers 12 CTE programs: Barbering, Biotechnology, Building & Property Maintenance, Business Administration, Commercial & Advertising Arts, Computer Networking, Cosmetology, Culinary Arts, Digital Media, Fashion Design, Graphic Design, Music Production. Dobbins athletics consist of Football, Cross-Country, Volleyball, Soccer, Basketball, Indoor Track, Bowling, Cheerleading, Badminton, Baseball, Softball and Outdoor Track.

== History ==
The Dobbins building was added to the National Register of Historic Places in 1988.

The namesake, Murrell H. Dobbins (1843-1917), was a New Jersey-born man who became a member of the Philadelphia school board.

At one point the school had two campuses and was known as the Dobbins/Randolph Area Vocational Technical School. It had absorbed the Randolph Skills Center (Randolph Technical High School), named after Asa Philip Randolph.

== Notable alumni ==
- Thom Bell, Philly Soul songwriter, producer and arranger
- Benjamin Britt, surrealist painter
- Bobby Eli, Philly Soul guitarist, songwriter, producer, arranger; founding member of MFSB
- Hank Gathers, college basketball player
- Gregory "Bo" Kimble, NBA player
- Doug Overton, retired professional basketball player and current head coach of the Springfield Armor of the NBA Development League
- Dawn Staley, head coach of women's basketball at University of South Carolina; 3-time Olympian
- Jami M. Valentine, Ph.D., physicist, first African American woman to earn a Ph.D. in physics from Johns Hopkins University; Dobbins class of 1992
