= Randolph Academy =

Randolph Academy may refer to:

- Randolph Academy for the Performing Arts, a private career college specializing in singing, dancing and acting founded in Toronto, Ontario in 1992
- Randolph Academy Union Free School District, a special needs public school district in New York State
- Randolph-Macon Academy, a coeducational college preparatory school for students in grades 6–12 and postgraduates founded in Front Royal, Virginia in 1892
- Institutions named in honor of Asa Phillip Randolph
  - A. Philip Randolph Academies of Technology, also known as Randolph Skill Center High School, in Jacksonville, Florida
  - Randolph Technical High School, a Philadelphia public high school
