= National Brotherhood of Workers of America =

The National Brotherhood of Workers of America (NBWA) was the largest body of organised African American workers in the United States of America in 1919.

== First congress ==
The organisation was formed by T.J. Pree and R.T. Sims. A. Philip Randolph was also on the board. The NBWA held its congress in Washington, D.C., from 8–14 September 1919. There were 115 delegates primarily from the South. Three delegates were from the Industrial Workers of the World and fifteen from the Society for the Advancement of Trade Unionism among Negroes. No delegates were accepted from the American Federation of Labor.

== Resolutions ==
They passed resolutions to the effect that:

". . . The combination of black and white workers will be a powerful lesson to the capitalists of the solidarity of labor. It will show that labor, black and white, is conscious of its interests and power. This will serve to convert a class of worker, which has been used by the capitalist class to defeat organised labor, into an ardent, class-conscious, intelligent, militant group."

"and be it further resolved, that we recommend to all the working people of our race, that they immediately make themselves acquainted more in detail with the aims, objects and methods of said organization, the National Association for the Protection of Labor Unionism Among Negroes, in order that we may, as speedily as possible, align ourselves with and join the industrial unions that have already organized, and help to organize new industrial unions in such industries where they do not yet exist.

"and be it further resolved, that we shall henceforth devote all our energies to building up the new order of society along lines above indicated, to the exclusion of efforts hitherto expended in other directions."

The NBWA functioned as an independent Union, drawing most of its support from shipyard and dock workers in the Tidewater region of Virginia area. The union dissolved in 1921, under pressure from the American Federation of Labor.
