= A Freedom Budget for All Americans =

1960s U.S. economic equality element of civil rights movement

In the fall of 1965, A. Philip Randolph, Bayard Rustin and Dr. Martin Luther King Jr., prominent economists, allies from the labor movement, and others who had participated in the 1963 March on Washington began working on what they called "A Freedom Budget For All Americans". Writing 50 years later in The Nation, John Nichols listed as its goals "the abolition of poverty, guaranteed full employment, fair prices for farmers, fair wages for workers, housing and healthcare for all, the establishment of progressive tax, and fiscal policies that respected the needs of working families." Randolph worked with Bayard Rustin and King on the Freedom Budget document. He was determined to win the "full and final triumph of the civil rights movement, to be achieved by going beyond civil rights, linking the goal of racial justice with the goal of economic justice for all people in the United States" and doing so "by rallying massive segments of the 99% of the American people in a powerfully democratic and moral crusade."

Rustin, the architect of the Freedom Budget, was equally convinced that racial equality would not be achieved unless it was united with the pursuit of economic equality. He spoke of the need for a “program of racial equality” that was “so intertwined with progressive economic and social policies as to make it impossible to choose one without the other." This conviction motivated Rustin to develop the Freedom Budget. Rustin found it encouraging that President Lyndon Johnson seemed willing to connect racial equality to a broader progressive agenda of social and economic policies. In a commencement address at Howard University in June 1965, Johnson denounced the economic disparities between white and Black Americans and promised to fight against this “inherited gateless poverty.”

Randolph and Rustin's first public mention of the concept of a Freedom Budget was in November 1965 at a planning meeting for the White House Conference on Civil Rights. They envisioned that the Freedom Budget would be much larger than Johnson's Great Society agenda, to the point that members of Johnson's administration were concerned that the Freedom Budget would upstage Johnson's own initiatives. The idea of a Freedom Budget gained traction from the press, and over the next several months, Rustin worked to curry support from over 150 leaders, including those from civil rights leadership, labor organizations, liberal groups, and church organizations. He also sought input from economists and social scientists. This broad support reflected a shared belief across various communities that tackling poverty and promoting economic justice required a united effort from all corners of American society.

In 1966, civil rights leaders A. Philip Randolph, Bayard Rustin, and Martin Luther King Jr. unveiled the Freedom Budget for All Americans, a bold economic plan aimed at eradicating poverty and achieving full employment within ten years. The budget called for large-scale public investment in jobs, housing, healthcare, and education, and emphasized that the fight against poverty would benefit Americans of all races—highlighting that most of the country's poor at the time were white.

The Freedom Budget outlined particular annual targets seeking to reduce unemployment in America. The plan aimed to reduce unemployment to a low rate of 3% or lesser, by 1970, and reaching full employment by 1975. It sought to increase employment in the public sector of the economy. It laid responsibility on the government to ensure decent wages for every individual willing to work. This was a drastic change from the previous liberal economic policies enforced in the United States of America.

Price stability was another key aspect, pertaining to The Budget, as a measure to curb assumptions relating to inflation. Critical analysis claimed that intensive spending would lead to an inflationary spiral in the economy. The Freedom Budget presented the opposite. It argued that public investment could lead to an expansion in society, without directly affecting the cost of living. It argued that when spending is aimed to increase production; particularly in employment and housing, the growth in economy would dilute costs rather than inflate it.

The Budget was imposed to be a moral document that served as economics rights to democratic citizenship. It was intended to be a moral framework. It argued that access to livable conditions, affordable education, employment and healthcare should be a guaranteed right to all citizens. A. Philip Randolph and Bayard Rustin believed that economic justice was aligned with humanity and that the success of democracy would be dependent on the security of the well-being of its citizens, with an emphasis on African Americans and the underprivileged sections of society.

It critiqued the New Deal and urged reforms for more inclusivity. The Freedom Budget drew inspiration from the New Deal policies such as public investment and employment reforms but it critiqued it's racial prowess. Many policies, such as Social security and Labor Protection did not provide the same rights and liberties to Black individuals and laborers of other ethnicities. It sought to introduce the same guarantees to these minorities and eliminate rampant poverty. Economic equity became a core objective for the Freedom Budget, aligning it with the Civil Rights Movement.

Rustin unveiled the Freedom Budget in October 1966 to favorable press coverage and a positive public reception. He disseminated pamphlets written in an approachable style to gain the support of the American middle and working classes. In doing so, he sought to alleviate their concerns that a fight against poverty would negatively impact their own financial wellbeing. In addition, he lobbied extensively for the Freedom Budget, traveling the country on a speaking tour and organizing a two-pronged crusade to gain support from influential figures while mobilizing grassroots activism.

Upon its introduction in 1966, A Freedom Budget for All Americans received support from civil rights leaders, labor unions, and progressive organizations. However, it also faced significant challenges and criticisms that hindered its implementation. One major concern the public had was the budget's ambitious financial scope. Critics questioned the feasibility of funding such an extensive program, especially during a period of escalating expenditures for the Vietnam War. The war's financial demands diverted attention and resources away from domestic initiatives, making it difficult to garner the necessary political and public support for the Freedom Budget. Additionally, some economists and policymakers expressed skepticism about the budget's economic assumptions. They argued that the proposed levels of public investment could lead to inflationary pressures and doubted the government's capacity to effectively manage and implement the wide-ranging programs outlined in the plan.

Despite Rustin's efforts, the Freedom Budget failed. Multiple factors contributed to this failure. The significant Republican gains in the 1966 midterm elections challenged Rustin's hopes for the formation of a progressive coalition. Additionally, by this point, white activists’ focus was shifting to the Vietnam War as antiwar sentiment took hold. Rustin had crafted the Freedom Budget so that it would not require a decrease in defense spending. He did this to demonstrate that fighting in Vietnam and fighting against poverty were not mutually exclusive. However, economist Seymour Melman denounced the Freedom Budget as “a war budget,” and other critics rejected it on the grounds that it seemed to give tacit approval to the war in Vietnam.

Though the Freedom Budget failed, its policy proposals influenced King's later economic justice efforts. Other efforts, such as Martin Luther King Jr.'s Poor People's Campaign was deeply influenced by the Freedom Budget's focus on economic rights as a fundamental part of civil rights. This carried forward the Freedom Budget's push for guaranteed jobs, income support, and access to essential services, showing how its ideas continued to shape the fight for social justice. The Freedom Budget had proposed a job guarantee for everyone ready and willing to work, a guaranteed income for those unable to work or those who should not be working, and a living wage to lift the working poor out of poverty. These policies provided the cornerstones for King's Poor People's Campaign.
