= Lucille Campbell Green Randolph =

American entrepreneur and activist

- Born: Lucille Campbell; April 15, 1883; Christiansburg, Virginia, U.S.
- Died: April 12, 1963 (aged 79)
- Education: Howard University; Lelia Beauty College
- Occupations: Entrepreneur, activist
- Spouses: Joseph Green; A. Philip Randolph

Lucille Campbell Green Randolph (April 15, 1883 – April 12, 1963) was an early graduate of Madam C. J. Walker's Lelia Beauty College, opening and running a successful salon in New York City. She was married to the civil rights activist A. Philip Randolph and was able to finance his newspaper The Messenger.

== Biography ==
Randolph née Campbell was born on April 15, 1883, in Christiansburg, Virginia. She studied at Howard University with the plan to become a teacher. At Howard she met her first husband, Joseph Green. The couple moved to New York City where she taught school and he worked at a customs house.

Joseph Green died shortly after the couple settled in New York and Randolph subsequently enrolled in one of the first classes of Lelia Beauty College, the beauty school founded by Madam C. J. Walker. Randolph opened a successful salon on 135th Street that catered to African-American elite women.

Randolph became involved with political activism, becoming a member of the American Labor Party. In 1914 Randolph married fellow Socialist A. Philip Randolph. She supported him both financially and politically. She was able to publish his Socialist newspaper, The Messenger, which she then distributed from her salon. With her support he was also able to organize for labor, and human rights of African Americans, becoming an important voice in the civil rights movement.

She died on April 12, 1963.
