= Jami Valentine =

American patent examiner

Jami Valentine Miller
- Born: December 3, 1974 (age 51); Philadelphia, Pennsylvania
- Other name: Jami Valentine
- Education: Johns Hopkins University; Brown University; Florida A&M University
- Known for: Johns Hopkins University's first African-American woman to earn a PhD in Physics and Astronomy; Founder of African American Women in Physics Inc
- Scientific career
- Workplaces: U.S. Patent and Trademark Office
- Thesis: "Spin Polarization Measurements of Rare Earth Thin Films" (2006)
- Doctoral advisor: Chia-Ling Chien
- Website: www.DrJami.com

Jami Valentine Miller (born December 3, 1974) is a patent examiner at the United States Patent and Trademark Office. She was the first African American woman to graduate with a PhD in physics from Johns Hopkins University. She created the website AAWIP.com, which celebrates African American Women in Physics.

== Early life and education ==
Valentine was born in Philadelphia. During junior high she joined the Philadelphia Regional Introduction for Minorities to Engineering (PRIME) program, which prepared her for a career in physics or mathematics. She attended high school at Murrell Dobbins Vocational School, graduating in 1992. She completed a bachelor's degree in physics at Florida A&M University, which she graduated cum laude in 1996. Whilst at FAMU she was a "Life-Gets-Better" scholar, which allowed her to work as a summer research assistant at Lawrence Livermore National Laboratory. She also worked in the Center for Nonlinear and Nonequilibrium Aeroscience. Upon graduating from Fame, she moved on to Brown University for her postgraduate studies, earning a master's degree in 1998. Valentine studied under Chia-Ling Chien at Johns Hopkins University, where she worked on spintronics. Her research focused on novel rare earth metals for memory applications. She successfully defended her dissertation, "Spin Polarization Measurements of Rare Earth Thin Films", in 2006.

== Career ==
As a PhD student, Valentine realized that there were not many professors who looked like her. From 1973 to 2012, only 66 black American women earned PhDs in physics, compared to 22,172 white men. She became involved with national efforts to improve diversity in physics. She developed the nonprofit African American Women in Physics (AAWIP), which honors the contributions of African American women to physics. She has made efforts to meet and document as many of them as she can. She has worked with the National Society of Black Physicists to increase awareness of underrepresented groups to physics.

Valentine joined the United States Patent and Trademark Office as an electrical engineer, working on semiconductor and spintronic memory devices. In 2012 she was appointed primary examiner.

== Honors and awards ==
Valentine has been an invited speaker at several physics conferences as well as appearing on podcasts. In February 2017 she was honored by the National Society of Black Physicists for distinguished service to the organization. In 2016, she was honored with the Florida A & M University Distinguished Alumni Award. She was an invited plenary speaker for the 2019 Physics Congress where she was to address more than 1,500 physics and astronomy students. In 2022 she was honored with the Johns Hopkins University Distinguished Alumna Award.

She was named a Fellow of the American Physical Society in 2023, "for extraordinary contributions to diversity and inclusion in physics, both in the United States and internationally, and for essential contributions to the history and promotion of Black women in American physics, through the founding of African-American Women in Physics, Inc".

In 2023 she was appointed to the Johns Hopkins University Krieger School of Arts and Sciences Advisory Board. She also sits on the Physics and Astronomy Advisory Council for Hopkins.
