= Randolph Technical High School =

Coordinates: 40.009°N 75.179°W

Location
- 3101 Henry Ave. Philadelphia, Pennsylvania; United States

Information
- School district: School District of Philadelphia
- Principal: Michelle Burns
- Grades: 9-12
- Enrollment: 437
- Campus: Urban
- Website: randolph.philasd.org

Randolph Technical High School is a Philadelphia public high school that offers career and technical education (CTE) programs. It is named in honor of A. Philip Randolph, a union and civil rights leader, and is run by the Philadelphia School District.

== About ==
In 1975, the school opened as the A. Philip Randolph Skills Center and in 1993, it was annexed by the Murrell Dobbins Career and Technical Education High School to form the Dobbins/Randolph Area Vocational Technical School. As of 2004, the site formerly called Randolph Skills Center has been known as the A. Philip Randolph Career and Technical High School, though it is commonly referred to as the Randolph Technical High School. The NCES registered name is Randolph A. Philip Area Vocational-technical High School. During the 2024-2025 school year, enrollment was 437.

In 2025, Governor Josh Shapiro visited the school to highlight the results of historic investments in education. In previous year, math Keystone scores and English Language Arts (ELA) rose nearly 8% and 15.5%, respectively, while the graduation rate rose 14%, making one of the largest increases in the state.

== Shops ==
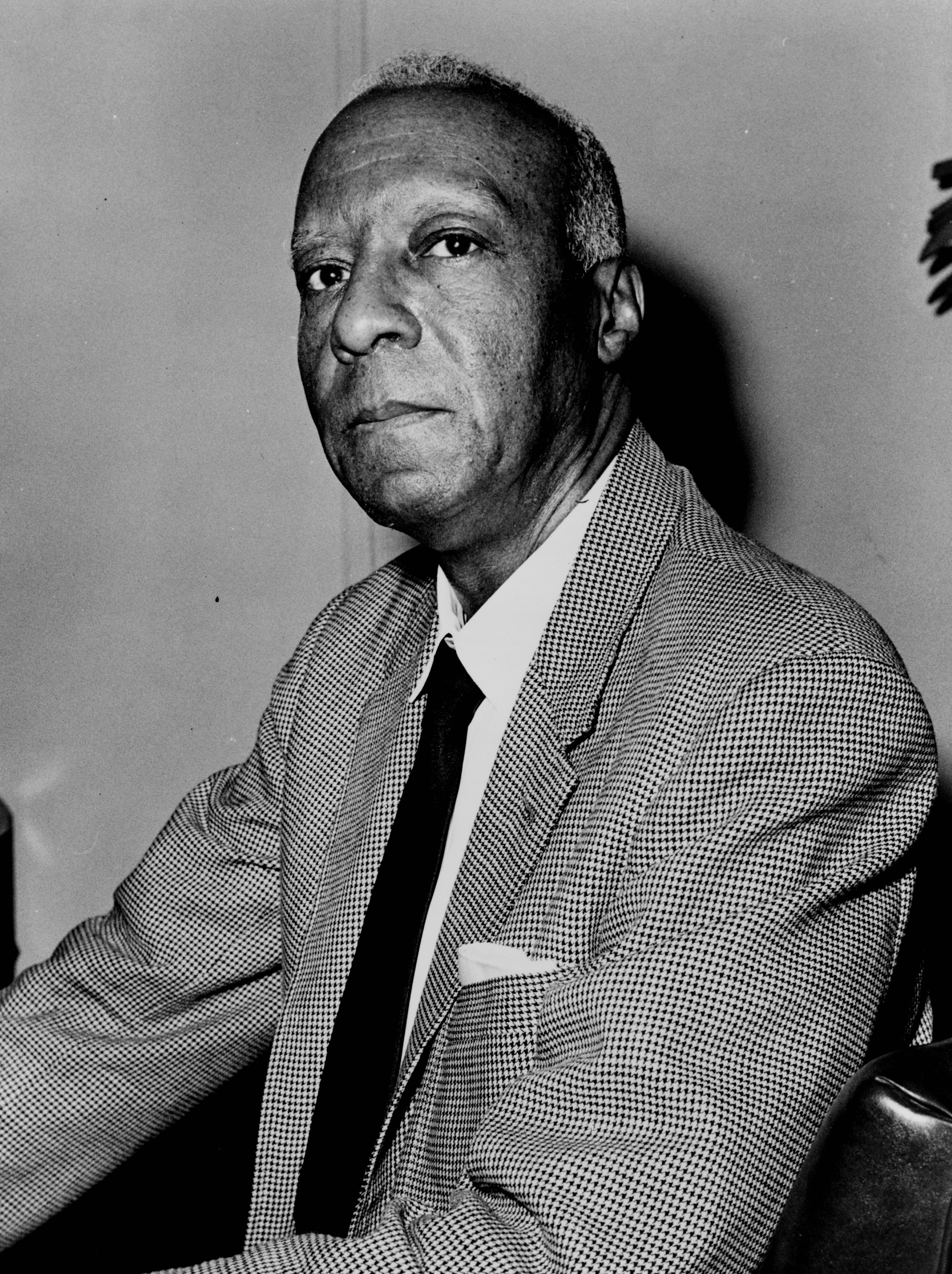
A. Philip Randolph for whom the school is named

=== Welding ===
Students entering the welding technology program are prepared to perfect both small and large scale welding techniques that are used in various forms of construction. Beginning in 2012, Airgas has donated equipment in support of the program.

=== Carpentry ===
The student learns the construction and repair of buildings and is educated to enter the construction industry. The student will be able to read specifications and architectural drawings, follow building codes, and use hand and power tools in construction projects. Graduates often work with small independent contractors.

=== Electrical shop ===
The student learns the theory and laws of electricity; get hands-on experience in construction and maintenance; learns industrial, commercial, and residential wiring in accordance with national and local codes; installs, tests, and repairs appliances. Graduates are qualified for entry-level jobs in electrical construction.

=== Auto body shop ===
The student repairs body parts with sanding and body tools; welds and cuts; and paints vehicles. Training often leads to employment in garages and shops in the city.

=== Auto mechanics ===
The student repairs and overhauls automobiles; works on suspension systems, drive and power train systems, engine, exhaust systems and cooling systems, and plans work procedures using automobile parts and manuals.

=== Health and related technology ===
The Health and Related Technology program prepares the student for a future in the medical health professions. The program has academic college bound subjects. In addition, medically related courses are given to prepare the students for careers in the health care field such as: physician, nurse, medical laboratory technologist, radiographer, physical therapist, etc. To promote professionalism and career opportunities, senior students spend three months at area hospitals assisting the medical staff in the program. Computer skills are also introduced.

=== EMT/Fire Academy ===
Randolph Technical High School is the only high school in Philadelphia that prepares students to become certified EMTs or firefighters. The EMT program prepares students, under the remote supervision of physicians, for a career as an emergency medical technician. The courses include instruction in basic, intermediate, and advanced EMT procedures like emergency surgical procedures, medical triage, rescue operations and crisis scene management. Classroom coursework teaches the basics of emergency medical care through anatomy, physiology, pathology, and toxicology.

== Student activities ==
=== Sports ===
The sports that are active at Randolph are baseball, football (which is shared with Dobbins), and basketball.

=== Student government ===
Randolph Student Government Association is an organization that provides social and community activities for the student body during the school year. The officers and student representatives from each homeroom spend time learning about governmental practices and responsibilities. The members of the Student Government meet with the principal once a month to discuss school matters and student concerns.

Students are encouraged to participate in school activities by awarding honor points for all grades, attendance, activities, club memberships, and sport teams. Honor points are accumulated over the four year high school period. During an awards assembly held in June, students are given certificates, pins, trophies, and medals based on the number of honor points they have. Seniors look forward to wearing these medals at graduation.

== Legacy ==
The Legacy Program is a non-profit organization sponsored by Delaware Valley College through a United States federal grant: TRJO. Legacy provides workshops, tutorials, field trips and individual counseling to students designed to address the following: academic enrichment; college/career preparation; ethnic identity and cultural diversity; and leadership development.

Legacy has provided workshops, lectures and trips to over 500 students since its inception at Dobbins/Randolph Area Vocational Technical School in 1994. Trips have included visits to local colleges and universities and New York television shows.
