= A. Philip Randolph =

American civil rights activist (1889–1979)

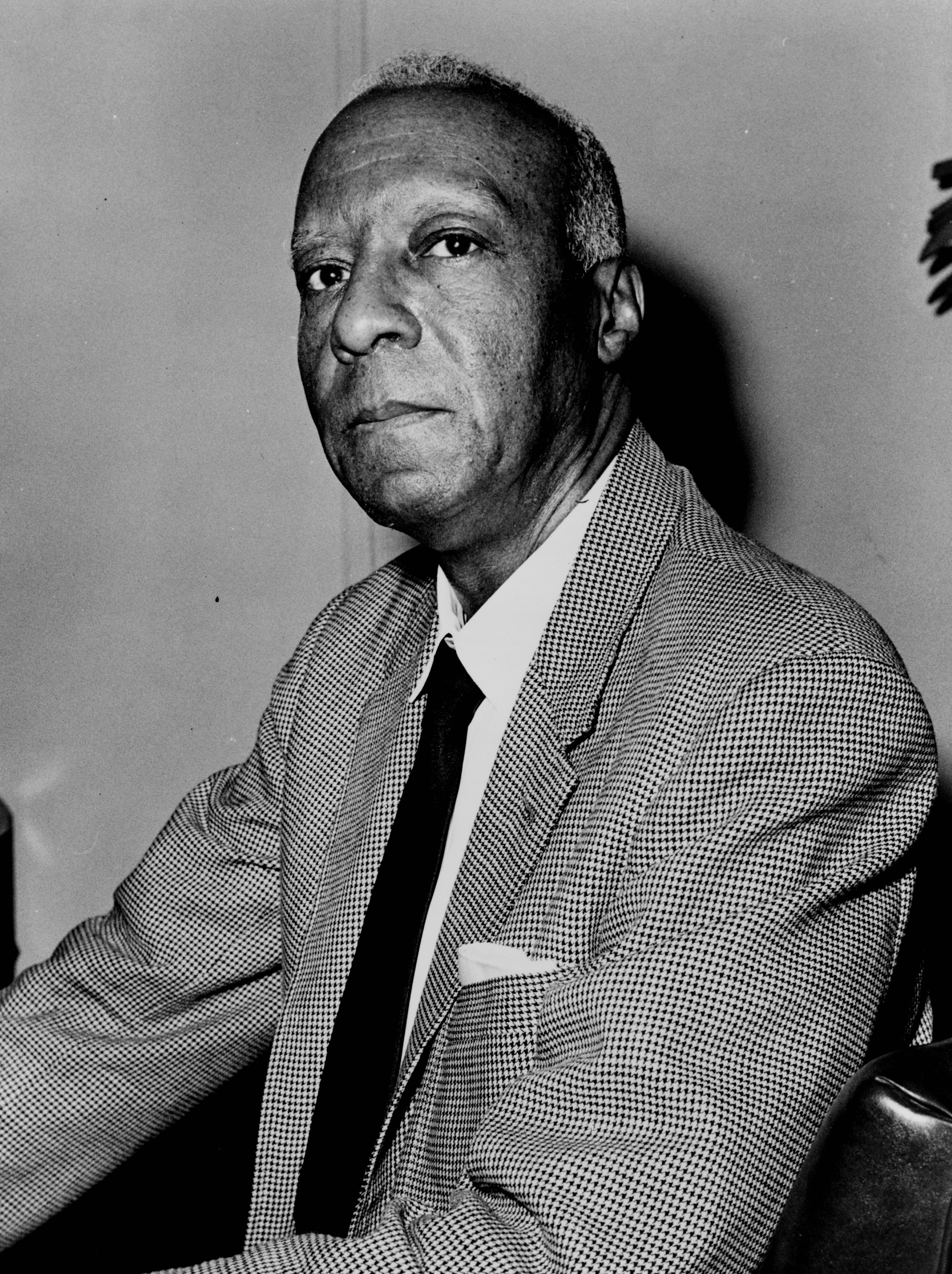
- Randolph in 1963

President of the Brotherhood of Sleeping Car Porters
- In office August 25, 1925 – September 4, 1968
- Preceded by: Position established
- Succeeded by: C. L. Dellums

President of the National Brotherhood of Workers of America
- In office c. March 1919 – c. July 1921
- Preceded by: Position established
- Succeeded by: Position abolished

Personal details
- Born: Asa Philip Randolph; April 15, 1889 Crescent City, Florida, U.S.
- Died: May 16, 1979 (aged 90) New York City, U.S.
- Party: Socialist
- Spouse: Lucille Campbell Green (m. 1914; died 1963)
- Education: Cookman Institute

Asa Philip Randolph (April 15, 1889 – May 16, 1979) was an American railwayman, trade unionist and civil rights activist. In 1925, he organized and led the Brotherhood of Sleeping Car Porters, the first successful African-American-led labor union. In the early Civil Rights Movement and the Labor Movement, Randolph was a prominent voice. His continuous agitation with the support of fellow labor rights activists against racist labor practices helped lead President Franklin D. Roosevelt to issue Executive Order 8802 in 1941, banning discrimination in the defense industries during World War II. The group then successfully maintained pressure, so that President Harry S. Truman proposed a new Civil Rights Act and issued Executive Orders 9980 and 9981 in 1948, promoting fair employment and anti-discrimination policies in federal government hiring, and ending racial segregation in the armed services.

Randolph was born and raised in Florida. He was educated at Cookman Institute, then moved to New York City as part of the early Great Migration, leaving behind the discriminatory Jim Crow–era south. There he became convinced that overcoming racism required collective action and he was drawn to socialism and workers' rights. He unsuccessfully ran for state office on the socialist ticket in the early 1920s, but found more success in organizing for African American workers' rights.

In 1963, Randolph was the head of the March on Washington, organized by Bayard Rustin, at which Reverend Martin Luther King Jr. delivered his "I Have a Dream" speech. Randolph inspired the "Freedom Budget", sometimes called the "Randolph Freedom budget", which aimed to deal with the economic problems facing the Black community. It was published by the Randolph Institute in January 1967 as "A Freedom Budget for All Americans".

== Biography ==
=== Early life and education ===
Asa Philip Randolph was born April 15, 1889, in Crescent City, Florida, the second son of James William Randolph, a tailor and minister in an African Methodist Episcopal Church, and Elizabeth Robinson Randolph, a seamstress. In 1891, the family moved to Jacksonville, Florida, which had a thriving, well-established African-American community.

Randolph's father taught him that color was less important than a person's character and conduct. His mother taught him the importance of education and of defending oneself physically against those who tried to hurt one or one's family, if necessary. Randolph remembered vividly the night his mother sat in the front room of their house with a loaded shotgun across her lap, while his father tucked a pistol under his coat and went off to prevent a mob from lynching a man at the local county jail.

Asa and his brother, James, were superior students. They attended the Cookman Institute in East Jacksonville, the only academic high school in Florida for African Americans. Asa excelled in literature, drama, and public speaking; he also starred on the school's baseball team, sang solos with the school choir, and was valedictorian of the 1907 graduating class.

After graduation, Randolph worked odd jobs and devoted his time to singing, acting, and reading. Reading W. E. B. Du Bois's The Souls of Black Folk convinced him that the fight for social equality was most important. Barred by discrimination from all but manual jobs in the South, Randolph moved to New York City in 1911, where he worked odd jobs and took social sciences courses at City College.

=== Marriage and family ===
In 1913, Randolph courted and married Lucille Campbell Green, a widow, Howard University graduate, and entrepreneur who shared his socialist politics. She earned enough money to support them both. The couple had no children.

=== Early career ===
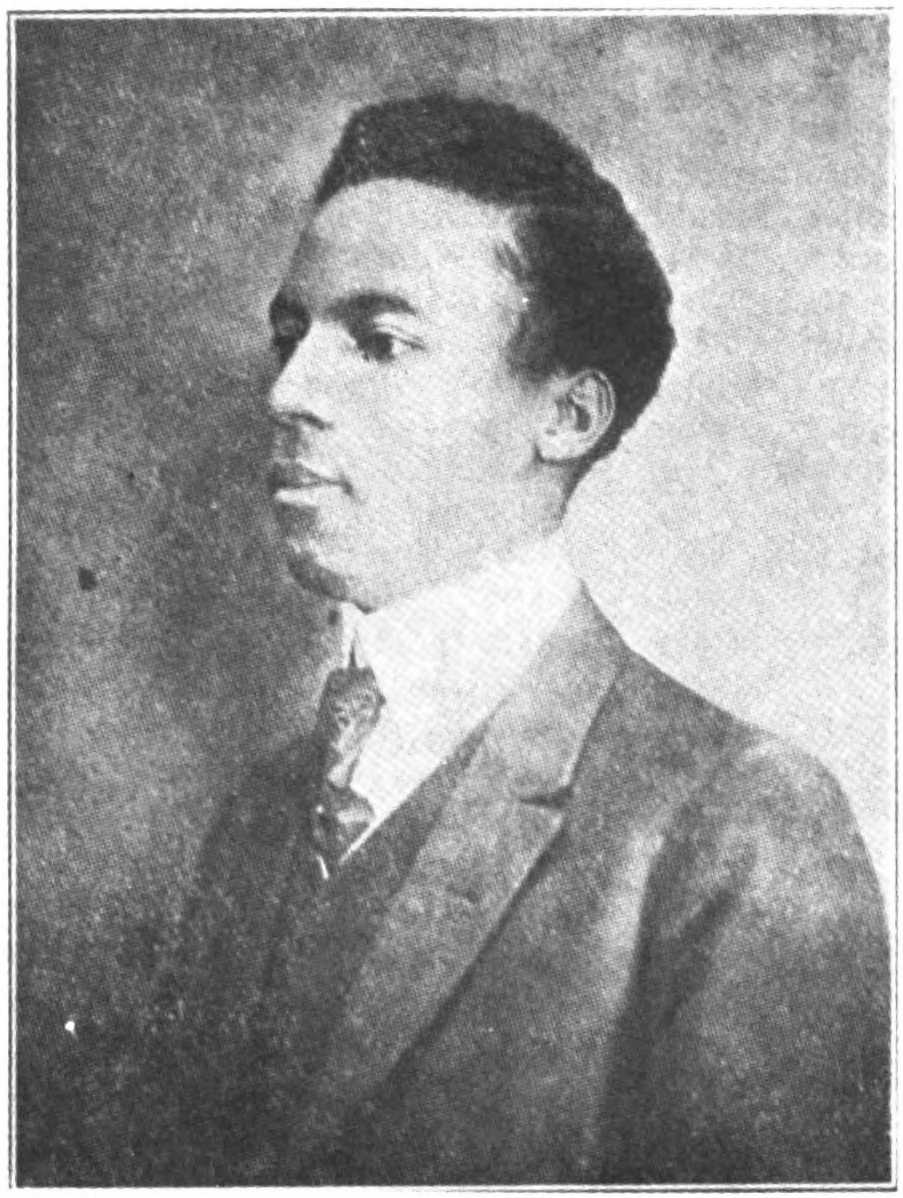
Randolph c. 1917

Shortly after Randolph's marriage, he helped organize the Shakespearean Society in Harlem. With them he played the roles of Hamlet, Othello, and Romeo, among others. Randolph aimed to become an actor but gave up after failing to win his parents' approval. Randolph's background as a Shakespearean actor gave him a "deep, resonant voice" that he used to considerable effect in his speeches while his dignified, "courtly" bearing assisted with negotiations.

In New York, Randolph became familiar with socialism and the ideologies espoused by the Industrial Workers of the World. He met Columbia University law student Chandler Owen, and the two developed a synthesis of Marxist economics and the sociological ideas of Lester Frank Ward, arguing that people could be free only if not subject to economic deprivation. At this point, Randolph developed what became his distinctive form of civil rights activism, which emphasized the importance of collective action as a way for Black people to gain legal and economic equality. To this end, he and Owen opened an employment office in Harlem to provide job training for southern migrants and encourage them to join trade unions.

Like others in the labor movement, Randolph favored immigration restriction. He opposed African Americans' having to compete with people willing to work for low wages. But unlike other immigration restrictionists, he rejected the notions of racial hierarchy that became popular in the 1920s.

In 1917, Randolph and Owen founded The Messenger with the help of the Socialist Party of America. It was a radical monthly magazine that campaigned against lynching, opposed U.S. participation in World War I, and urged African Americans to resist being drafted, fight for an integrated society, and join radical unions. The Department of Justice called The Messenger "the most able and the most dangerous of all the Negro publications." When it began publishing the work of Black poets and authors, a critic called it "one of the most brilliantly edited magazines in the history of Negro journalism."

Soon thereafter, the editorial staff of The Messenger became divided by three issues: the growing rift between West Indian and African Americans, support for the Bolshevik revolution, and support for Marcus Garvey's Back-to-Africa movement. In 1919, most West Indian radicals joined the new Communist Party, while African-American leftists—Randolph included—mostly supported the Socialist Party. The infighting left The Messenger short of financial support, and it went into decline.

Randolph unsuccessfully ran on the Socialist Party ticket for New York State Comptroller in 1920 and for Secretary of State of New York in 1922.

=== Union organizer ===
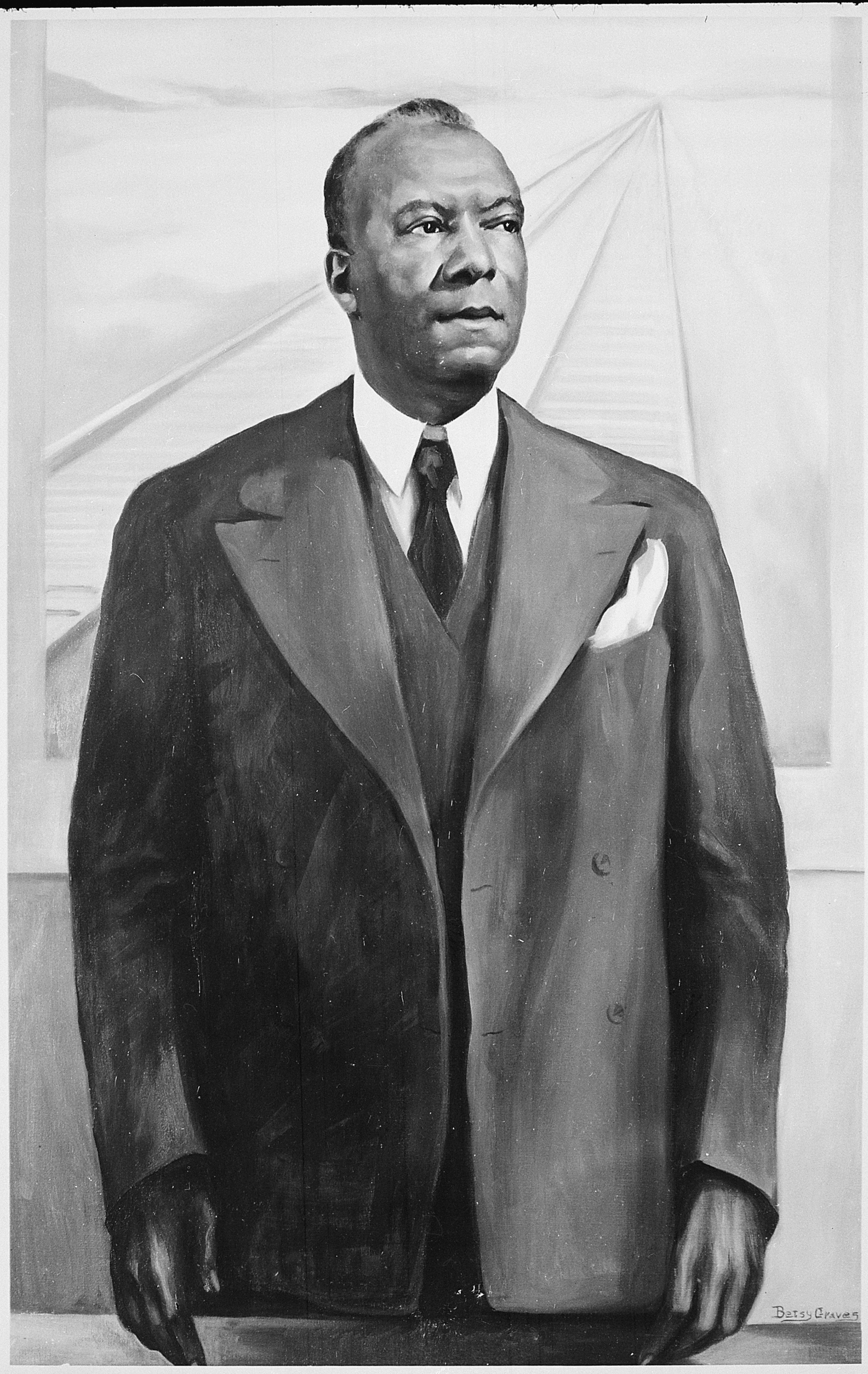
Painting by Betsy Graves Reyneau

Randolph's first experience with labor organization came in 1917, when he organized a union of elevator operators in New York City. In 1919 he became president of the National Brotherhood of Workers of America, a union that organized among African-American shipyard and dock workers in the Tidewater region of Virginia. The union dissolved in 1921 under pressure from the American Federation of Labor.

Randolph's greatest success came with the Brotherhood of Sleeping Car Porters (BSCP), which elected him president in 1925. This was the first serious effort to form a labor institution for employees of the Pullman Company, a major employer of African Americans. The railroads had dramatically expanded in the early 20th century, and the jobs offered relatively good employment at a time of widespread racial discrimination. But because porters were not unionized, most had poor working conditions and were underpaid.

Under Randolph's direction, the BSCP enrolled 51 percent of porters within a year, to which Pullman responded with violence and firings. In 1928, after failing to win mediation under the Watson-Parker Railway Labor Act, Randolph planned a strike. This was postponed after rumors circulated that Pullman had 5,000 replacement workers ready to take the place of BSCP members. As a result of its perceived ineffectiveness, membership in the union declined; by 1933 it had only 658 members and electricity and telephone service at headquarters had been disconnected because of nonpayment of bills.

The American historian William Harris wrote: "Randolph functioned mainly as a symbolic figure and spokesman. He was in the tradition of those Black leaders—they can be seen in the church and Black advancement organizations, as well as in politics—whose influence has derived largely from rhetoric and personal presence. But despite his superb rhetorical abilities and presence, Randolph was indecisive and prone to compromise". Harris described Randolph as the most charismatic Afro-American leader of his generation, writing: "Handsome, almost exquisite in bearing, and a master of the arts of oratory and rhetoric, his speech had a hypnotic effect upon his audience. He carried himself with an air that exuded such confidence that opponents found it almost impossible to deny the wisdom of his arguments and supporters were loyal almost to his every word." In 1926, Roy Lancaster, the treasurer of the BSCP, asked that before Randolph spoke at a meeting that his followers collect donations from the audience, because once Randolph spoke the audience would go into the streets full of enthusiasm and excitement.

The BSCP's fortunes changed with the 1932 election of President Franklin D. Roosevelt. With amendments to the Railway Labor Act in 1934, porters were granted rights under federal law. Membership in the Brotherhood jumped to more than 7,000. After years of bitter struggle, the Pullman Company began to negotiate with the Brotherhood in 1935, and agreed to a contract with it in 1937. Employees gained $2,000,000 in pay increases, a shorter workweek, and overtime pay. Randolph maintained the Brotherhood's affiliation with the American Federation of Labor through the 1955 AFL-CIO merger.

=== Civil rights leader ===
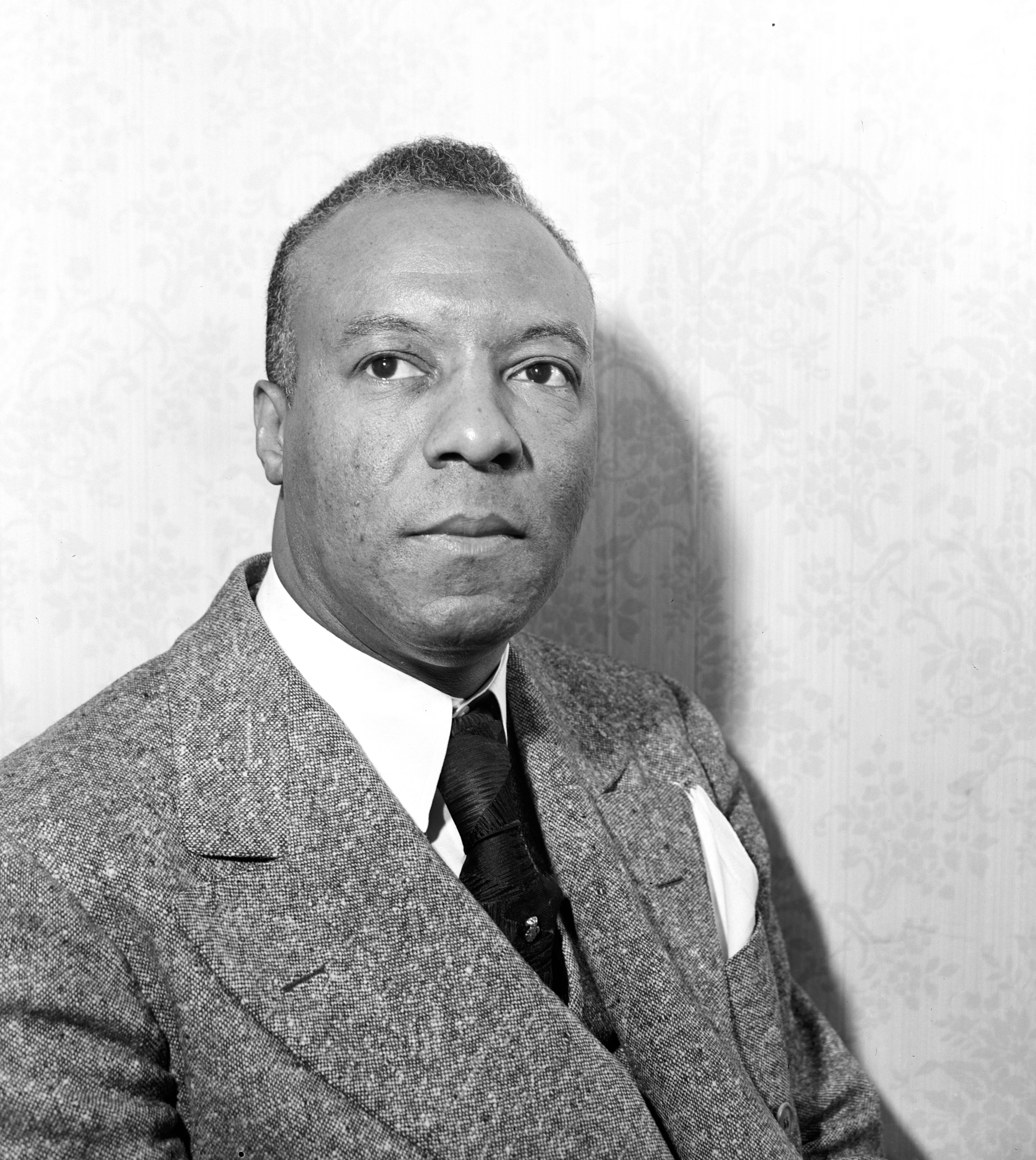
Randolph in 1942.

Through his success with the BSCP, Randolph emerged as one of the most visible spokespeople for African-American civil rights. He called shaping public opinion "the most powerful weapon in America" and by 1940 had become the face of the U.S. civil rights movement. A powerful bloc of conservative Southern Democratic whites in both houses of Congress implacably opposed any sort of civil rights legislation, so, like many other Black leaders, Randolph tended to focus more on having Roosevelt issue executive orders favorable to civil rights than on lobbying Congress to pass civil rights legislation. In September 1940, at the annual BSCP convention in Harlem, Randolph urged the Roosevelt administration to have no discrimination in the Selective Training and Service Act, which was being debated in Congress at the time. First Lady Eleanor Roosevelt was a speaker at the convention, and through her, Randolph obtained a meeting at the White House with President Franklin D. Roosevelt on September 27, 1940. At the meeting, Roosevelt promised Randolph there would be no segregation in the military, saying he was sympathetic to the civil rights movement. Two weeks later, the War Department issued a statement saying "the policy of the War Department is not to intermingle colored and white enlisted personnel". Feeling betrayed, Randolph launched nationwide protests demanding the end of segregation in not only the military but also the industries that made weapons for it. At the time, the Roosevelt administration was gearing up to make the U.S. "the arsenal of democracy" by supplying a massive number of weapons to the United Kingdom and its allies that were fighting in World War II, and banning segregation in the defense-related industry would be a huge gain for the civil rights movement. Randolph told an aide: "I think we ought to have 10,000 Negros march down Pennsylvania Avenue...We shall not call upon our white friends to march with us. There are some things that Negros must do on their own".

In 1941, Randolph, Bayard Rustin, and A. J. Muste proposed a march on Washington to protest racial discrimination in war industries, an end to segregation, access to defense employment, the proposal of an anti-lynching law, and the desegregation of the U.S. armed forces. Randolph's belief in the power of peaceful direct action was inspired partly by Mahatma Gandhi's success using such tactics during the Indian independence movement. Randolph threatened to have 50,000 Black people march on Washington. In early May 1941, Randolph made the call for a march on Washington, which generated immense enthusiasm among Afro-Americans. On 18 June 1941, Randolph again met with Roosevelt at the White House with the mayor of New York, Fiorello La Guardia, serving as a mediator. Roosevelt asked Randolph to call off the march, saying "questions like this cannot be settled with a sledgehammer", and vaguely promised to have discussions if the march was canceled. Randolph said the march would not be canceled unless Roosevelt gave way. La Guardia broke the impasse by saying: "Gentlemen, it is clear that Mr. Randolph is not going to call off the march, and I suggest we all begin to seek a formula". The march was canceled after Roosevelt issued Executive Order 8802, or the Fair Employment Act.

Some activists, including Rustin, felt betrayed because Roosevelt's order banned discrimination only in war industries, not the armed forces. Zora Neale Hurston later complained, "Poor Randolph was tricked and trapped by that committee that FDR sent into a backroom of the White House to come back with some device that would save the face of the Administration and that was all that happened."

Nonetheless, the Fair Employment Act is generally considered an important early civil rights victory. Executive Order 8802 read: "There shall be no discrimination in the employment of workers in defense industries or the government because of race, creed, color or national origin". Randolph dropped his demand for an integrated military, which he seems to have privately regarded as unrealistic and only made as a bargaining chip in his talks with Roosevelt. The draft involved young men from all 48 states, and the bloc of conservative Southern whites in Congress would have fiercely fought an executive order for an integrated military. By contrast, most of the defense-related industry was in the Northeast, the Midwest, and California, so executive Order 8802 had only limited impact in the South. The proposed march on Washington was a turning point in the civil rights movement. One Black newspaper wrote at the time, "it demonstrated to the Doubting Thomases among us that only mass action can pry open the doors that have been erected against America's Black minority". Before 1941, Black leaders had generally sought to lobby white politicians to change the laws. After 1941, there was a tendency to bypass politicians and instead engage in protests. Executive Order 8802 led to an exodus of Black people out of the South comparable to the Great Migration of the early 20th century. For example, in every month of 1942, about 10,000 Afro-Americans from the South, mostly from Texas and Louisiana, settled in the Los Angeles area, to take jobs in the well-paying aviation industry.

The movement continued to gain momentum. Unlike World War I, Randolph supported the war effort in World War II under the slogan "Double Victory", meaning victory over fascism abroad and racism at home. In 1942, an estimated 18,000 Black people gathered at Madison Square Garden to hear Randolph kick off a campaign against discrimination in the military, war industries, government agencies, and labor unions.

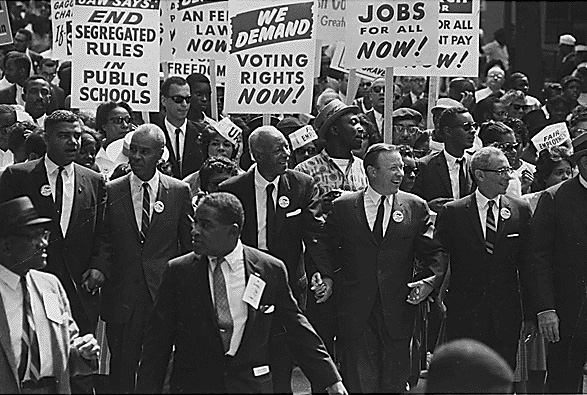
Leaders of the March on Washington for Jobs and Freedom marching from the Washington Monument to the Lincoln Memorial, August 28, 1963.

In 1943, Randolph visited Memphis to launch a personal campaign for free speech after E. H. Crump, a Democratic ally of Roosevelt, successfully used strong-arm and political pressure tactics to drive two prominent local Black Republicans, J. B. Martin and Robert Church Jr., out of the city. After he came to Memphis, Crump denied Randolph venues and intimidated local Black leaders into declining speaking invitations by threatening them with jail. When Randolph urged Eleanor Roosevelt, who had friendly political ties with Crump, to do something to counter Crump's "fascist" denial of free speech, she refused. Her reply to Randolph on December 18 read in full: "I referred your letter to a friend of mine when I received it and I am sorry it has not been answered before. I was advised not to do anything, as it might do more harm than good."

Randolph and other activists continued to press for African Americans' rights. In 1947, Randolph and Grant Reynolds renewed efforts to end discrimination in the armed services, forming the Committee Against Jim Crow in Military Service, later renamed the League for Non-Violent Civil disobedience. When President Harry S. Truman asked Congress for a peacetime draft law, Randolph urged young Black men to refuse to register. Truman was vulnerable to defeat in 1948 and needed the support of the growing Black population in northern states, and he capitulated. On July 26, 1948, Truman began ending racial segregation in the armed forces with Executive Order 9981.

In 1950, along with NAACP Executive Secretary Roy Wilkins and National Jewish Community Relations Advisory Council leader Arnold Aronson, Randolph founded the Leadership Conference on Civil Rights (LCCR), which became a major civil rights coalition. It coordinated a national legislative campaign on behalf of every major civil rights law since 1957.

External audio
- National Press Club Luncheon Speakers, A. Philip Randolph, August 26, 1963, 55:17, Randolph speaks starting at 4:56 about the forthcoming March on Washington, Library of Congress

Randolph and Rustin also formed an important alliance with Martin Luther King Jr. in 1957, when schools in the south resisted school integration after Brown v. Board of Education. Randolph and King organized the Prayer Pilgrimage for Freedom. In 1958 and 1959, Randolph organized Youth Marches for Integrated Schools in Washington, D.C. At the same time, he arranged for Rustin to teach King to organize peaceful demonstrations in Alabama and form alliances with progressive whites. The protests, directed by James Bevel in cities such as Birmingham and Montgomery, provoked violent backlash by police and the local Ku Klux Klan in 1963, which was captured on television and broadcast worldwide. Rustin later said that Birmingham "was one of television's finest hours. Evening after evening, television brought into the living-rooms of America the violence, brutality, stupidity, and ugliness of [police commissioner] Eugene "Bull" Connor's effort to maintain racial segregation." Partly as a result of the violent spectacle in Birmingham, which was becoming an international embarrassment, the Kennedy administration drafted civil rights legislation aimed at ending Jim Crow.

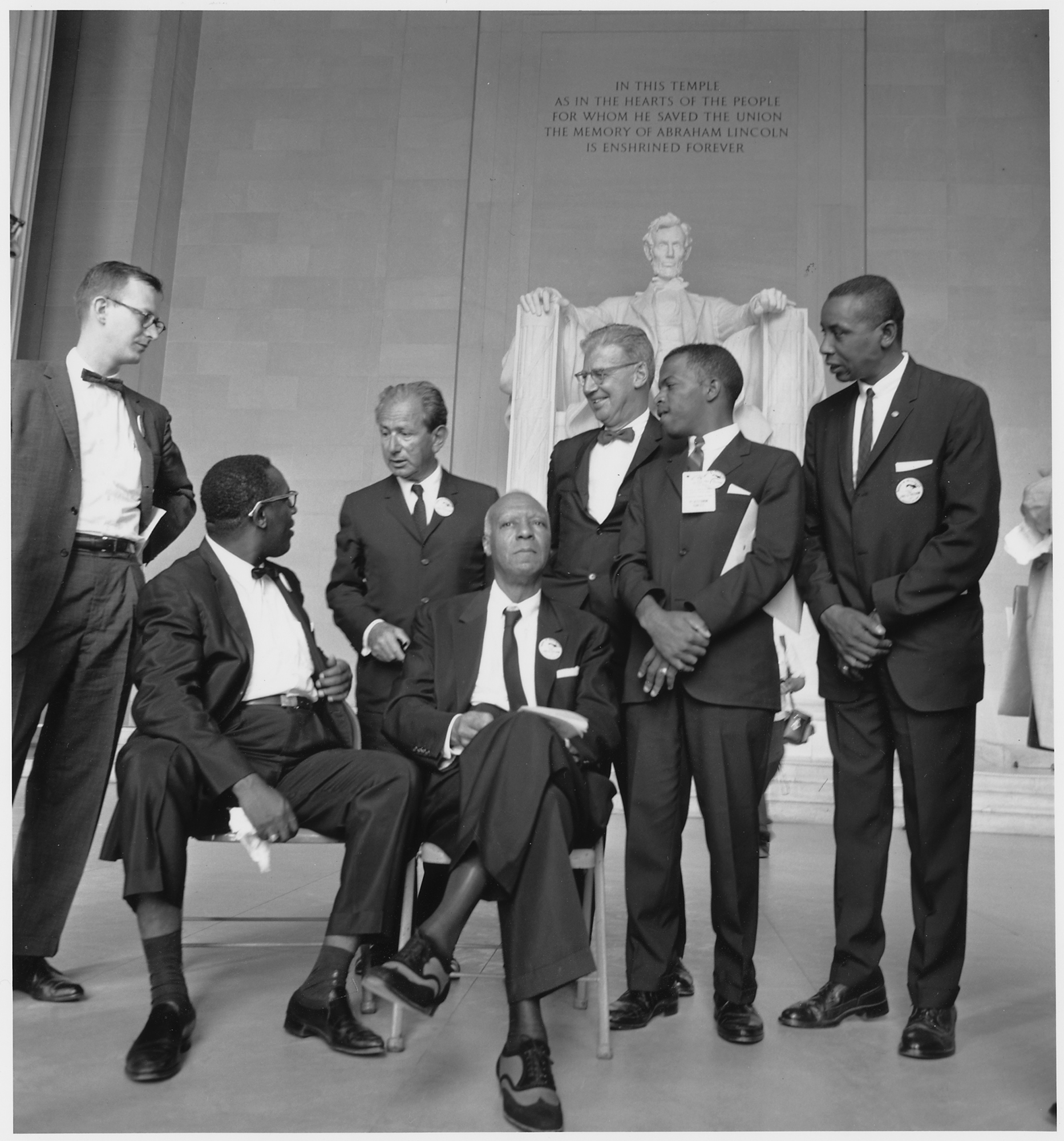
Leaders of the March on Washington for Jobs and Freedom in Washington, D.C. Randolph is seated center.

Randolph finally realized his vision for a March on Washington for Jobs and Freedom on August 28, 1963. It attracted between 200,000 and 300,000 to the nation's capital. The rally is often remembered as the high point of the Civil Rights Movement, and it did help keep the issue in the public consciousness. But when President Kennedy was assassinated three months later, civil rights legislation stalled in the Senate. In 1964, under President Lyndon B. Johnson, the Civil Rights Act finally passed. In 1965, the Voting Rights Act passed. King and Bevel deserve great credit for these legislative victories, but the importance of Randolph's contributions to the Civil Rights Movement is large.

=== Religion ===
Randolph avoided speaking publicly about his religious beliefs to avoid alienating his diverse constituencies. Though he is sometimes identified as an atheist, particularly by his detractors, Randolph identified with the African Methodist Episcopal Church he was raised in. He pioneered the use of prayer protests, which became a key tactic of the civil rights movement. In 1973, he signed the Humanist Manifesto II.

=== Death ===
Randolph died in his Manhattan apartment on May 16, 1979. For several years before his death, he had a heart condition and high blood pressure. He had no known living relatives, as his wife Lucille had died in 1963, before the March on Washington.

== Awards and accolades ==
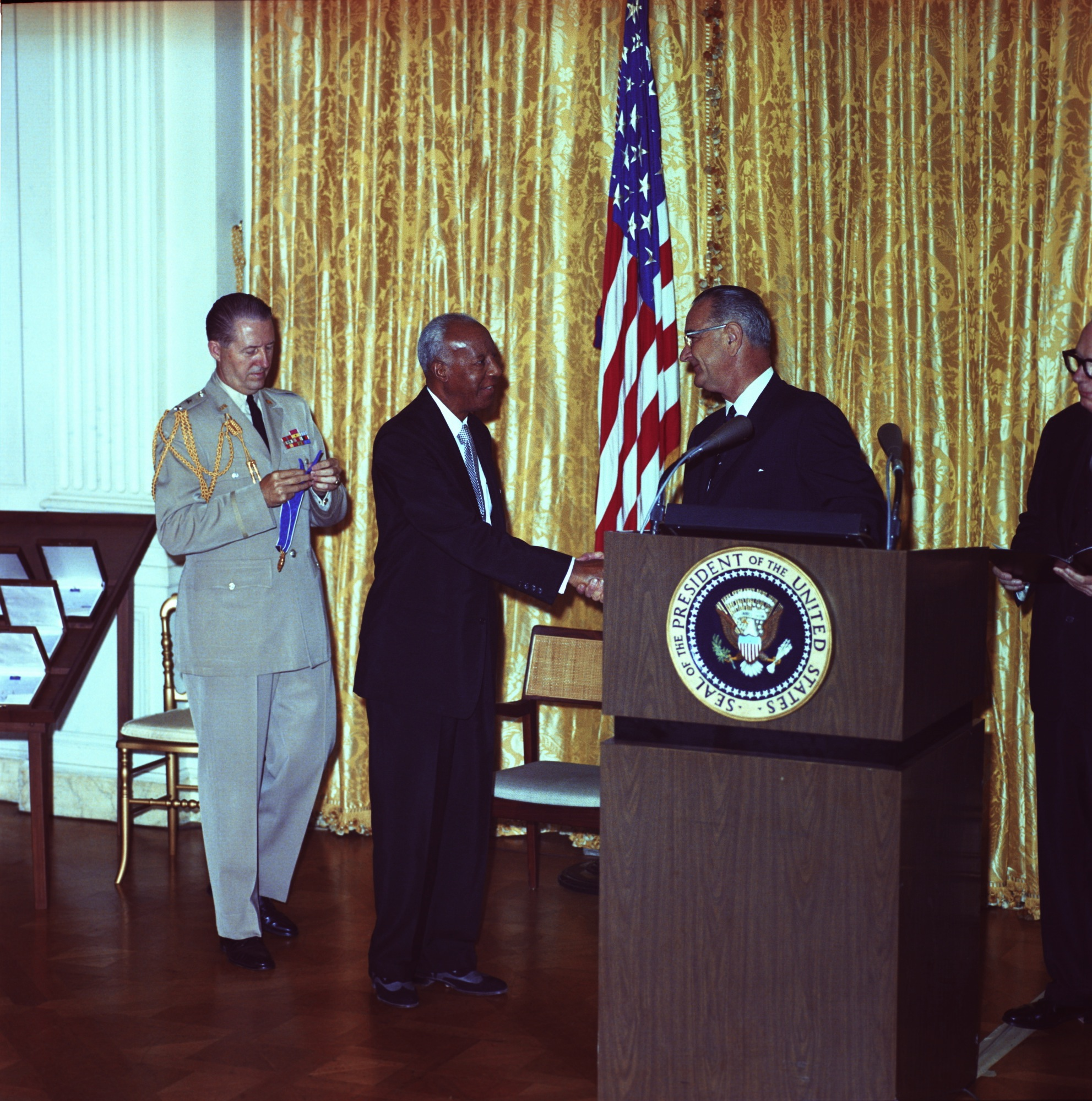
Randolph receiving the Presidential Medal of Freedom in 1964 from President Lyndon B. Johnson.

- In 1942, the NAACP awarded Randolph the Spingarn Medal.
- In 1953, the IBPOEW (Black Elks) awarded him their Elijah P. Lovejoy Medal, given "to that American who shall have worked most successfully to advance the cause of human rights, and for the freedom of Negro people."
- On September 14, 1964, President Lyndon B. Johnson presented Randolph with the Presidential Medal of Freedom.
- In 1967 awarded the Eugene V. Debs Award
- In 1967 awarded the Pacem in Terris Peace and Freedom Award. It was named after a 1963 encyclical letter by Pope John XXIII that calls upon all people of good will to secure peace among all nations.
- Named Humanist of the Year in 1970 by the American Humanist Association.
- Inaugural recipient of the Congressional Black Caucus Foundation's Adam Clayton Powell Award in 1972.
- Named to the Florida Civil Rights Hall of Fame in January 2014.

== Legacy ==
Randolph had a significant impact on the Civil Rights Movement from the 1930s onward. The Montgomery bus boycott in Alabama was directed by E. D. Nixon, who had been a member of the BSCP and was influenced by Randolph's methods of nonviolent confrontation. Nationwide, the Civil Rights Movement in the 1950s and 1960s used tactics pioneered by Randolph, such as encouraging African Americans to vote as a bloc, mass voter registration, and training activists for nonviolent direct action.

=== In buildings, streets, and trains ===
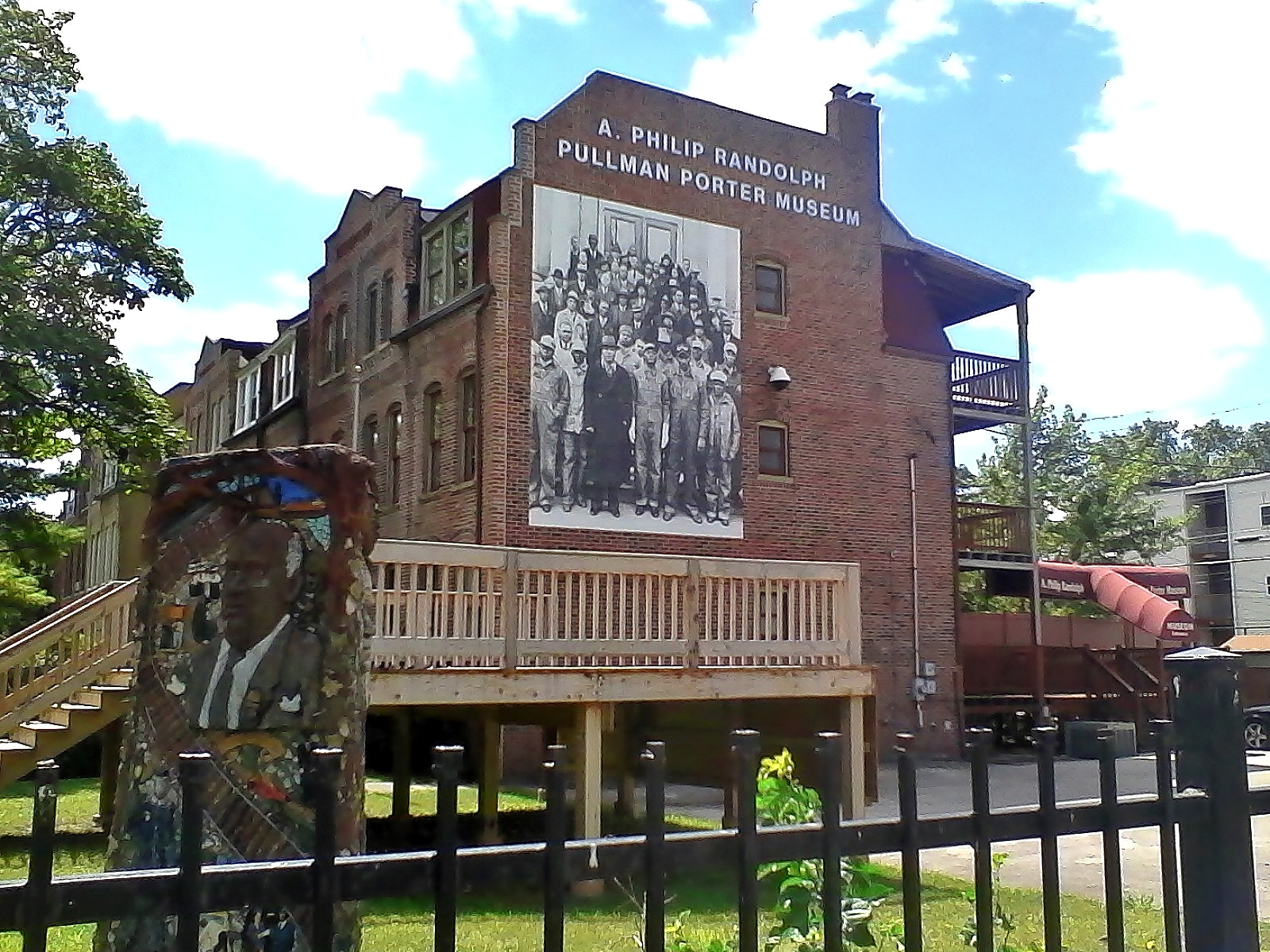
A. Philip Randolph Pullman Porter Museum, Chicago

- Amtrak named one of its best sleeping cars, Superliner II Deluxe Sleeper 32503, the "A. Philip Randolph" in his honor.
- A. Philip Randolph Academies of Technology, in Jacksonville, Florida, is named in his honor.
- A. Philip Randolph Boulevard in Jacksonville, Florida, formerly Florida Avenue, was renamed in 1995 in Randolph's honor. It is on Jacksonville's east side, near EverBank Stadium.
- A. Philip Randolph Heritage Park in Jacksonville, Florida.
- A. Philip Randolph Campus High School (New York City High School 540), on the City College of New York campus, is named in honor of Randolph. The school serves students predominantly from Harlem and surrounding neighborhoods.
- Randolph Technical High School in Philadelphia was named in his honor.
- The A. Philip Randolph Career and Technical Center in Detroit is named in his honor.
- The A. Philip Randolph Institute is named in his honor.
- Public School 76 A. Philip Randolph in New York City is named in his honor
- A. Philip Randolph Pullman Porter Museum is in Chicago's Pullman Historic District.
- Edward Waters University in Jacksonville, Florida houses a permanent exhibit on the life and accomplishments of A. Philip Randolph.
- Randolph Street, in Crescent City, Florida, was dedicated to him.
- A. Philip Randolph Library, at Borough of Manhattan Community College
- A. Philip Randolph Square park in Central Harlem was renamed from Dewey Square to honor Randolph in 1964 by the City Council.

=== Arts, entertainment, and media ===
- In the 2015 book The Road to Character, David Brooks includes him among the biographical sketches of individuals of good character
- In 1994 a PBS documentary, A. Philip Randolph: For Jobs and Freedom
- In 2002, scholar Molefi Kete Asante included Randolph on his list of 100 Greatest African Americans.
- The story of the Brotherhood of Sleeping Car Porters was made into the 2002 Robert Townsend film 10,000 Black Men Named George, starring Andre Braugher as Randolph. The title refers to the demeaning custom of the time when Pullman porters, all of whom were Black, were just addressed as "George" (short for "George's boys", a reference to Pullman Company founder George Pullman).
- A statue of Randolph was erected in his honor in the concourse of Washington Union Station in Washington, D.C.
- A statue of Randolph designed by sculptor Tina Allen was erected in Boston's Back Bay station and dedicated in 1988
- Glynn Turman played Randolph in the 2023 biopic Rustin produced by Barack and Michelle Obama.

=== Other ===
- James Farmer, co-founder of the Congress of Racial Equality (CORE), cited Randolph as one of his primary influences as a civil rights leader.
- Randolph was inducted into the Labor Hall of Honor in 1989.
- In May 2025, Randolph was inducted into the National Railroad Hall of Fame at Pullman National Historical Park.

== See also ==
- List of civil rights leaders
- List of people from Harlem
- Milton P. Webster
