= 25th Annual Black Reel Awards =

Film-industry awards in 2025

25th Black Reel Awards
- Date: February 17, 2025 (Film); August 18, 2025 (Television)

Highlights
- Most wins: Nickel Boys (6)
- Most nominations: Nickel Boys (13)
- Outstanding Film: Nickel Boys

The 25th Annual Black Reel Awards ceremony, presented by the Foundation for the Augmentation of African-Americans in Film (FAAAF) and honoring the best films of 2024, took place on February 17, 2025. The film nominations were announced on December 19, 2024, with the ceremony streamed live on their website.

The historical drama film Nickel Boys led with the most nominations at thirteen, followed closely by The Piano Lesson with twelve. Aunjanue Ellis-Taylor notably received two nominations for Outstanding Supporting Performance for her performances in Exhibiting Forgiveness and Nickel Boys. Zendaya also received dual recognition, both as an actor and producer of Challengers.

The nominations for the 9th Annual Black Reel Awards for Television were announced on June 18, 2025. The Netflix romantic teen drama series Forever led nominations with a total of 12, followed closely by the ABC sitcom Abbott Elementary with 11. The winners were announced online on August 18, 2025.

== Film nominees ==
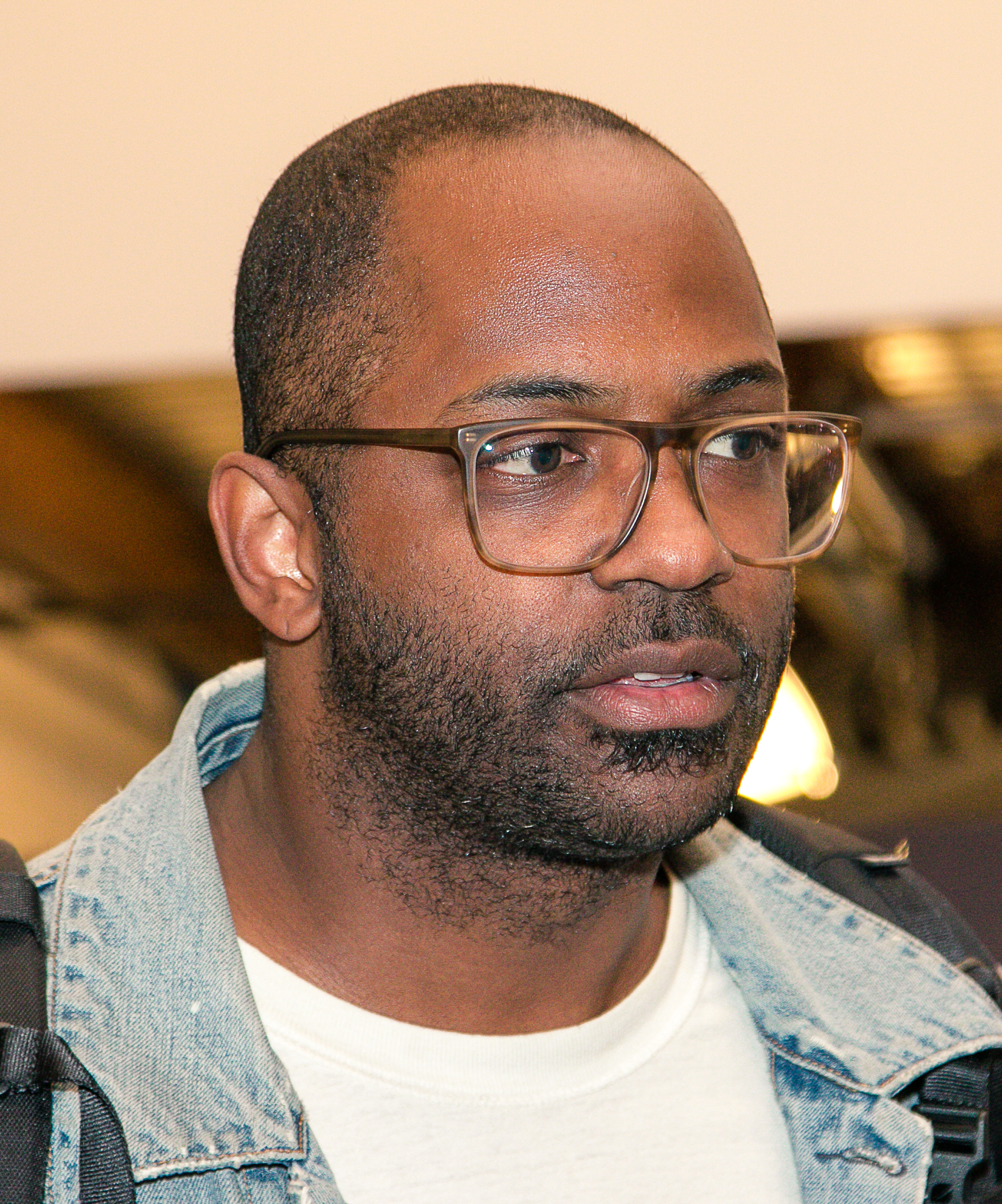
RaMell Ross, Outstanding Director winner and Outstanding Screenplay co-winner

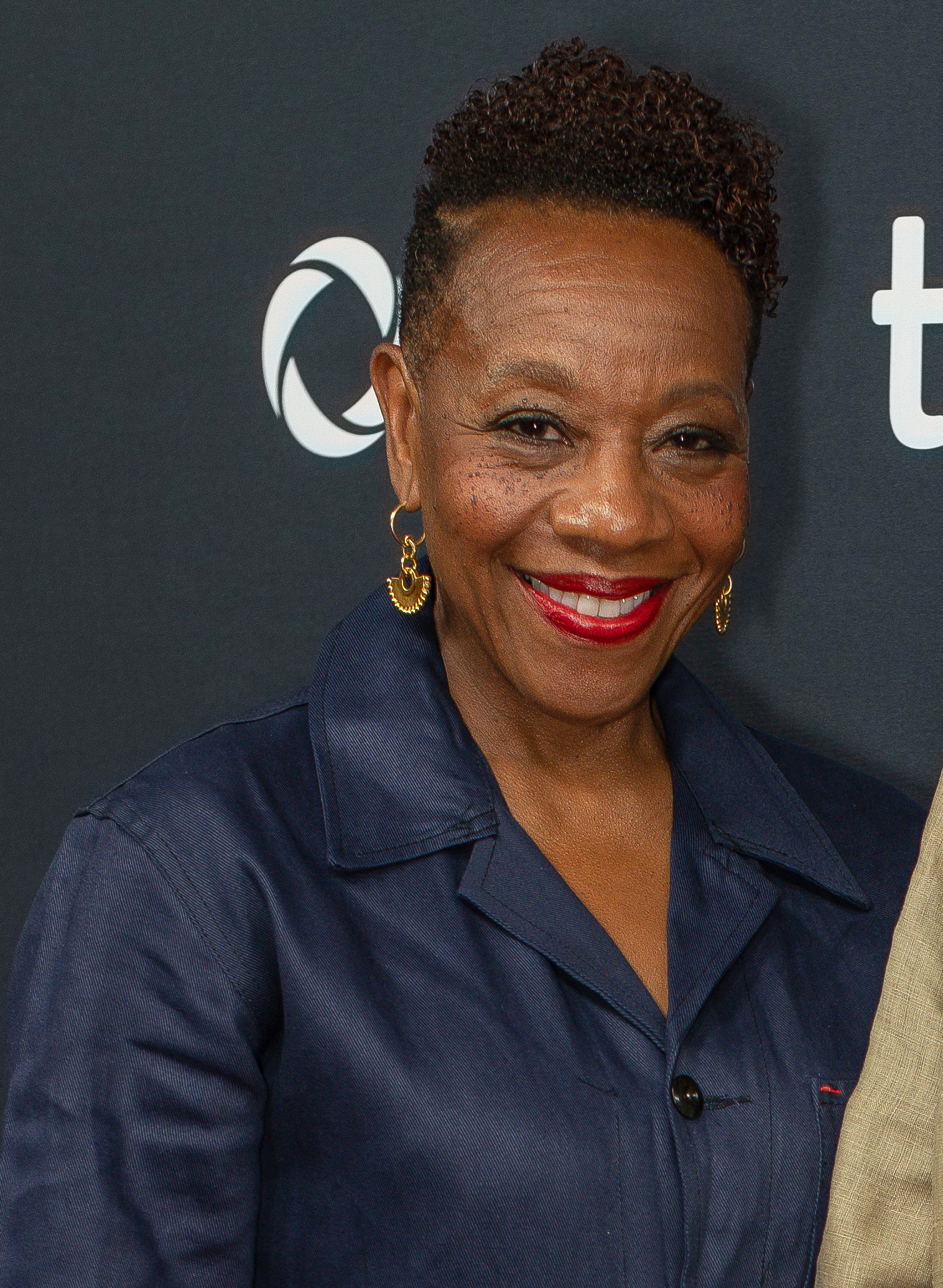
Marianne Jean-Baptiste, Outstanding Lead Performance winner

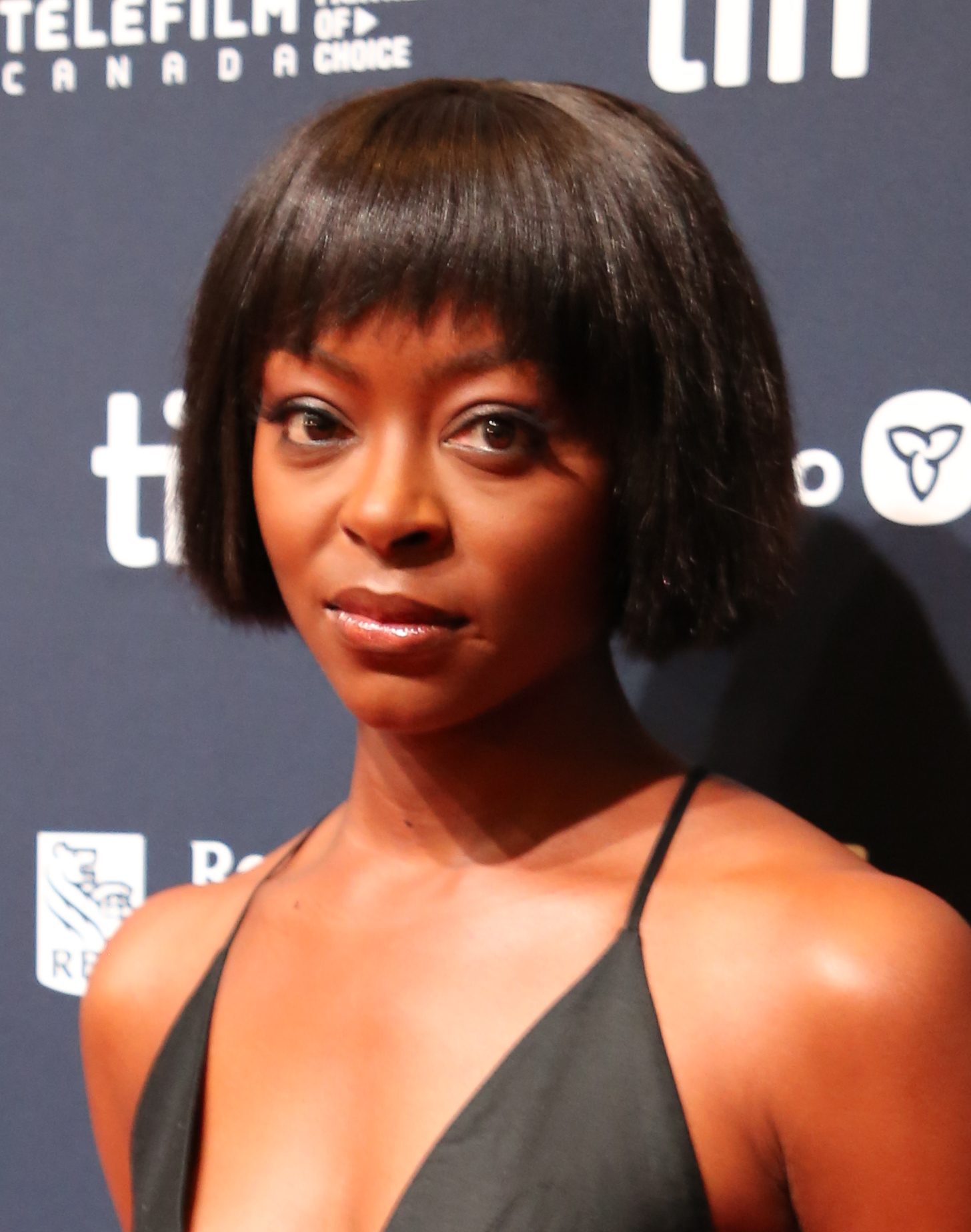
Danielle Deadwyler, Outstanding Supporting Performance winner

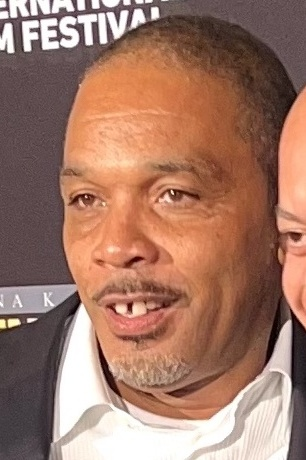
Clarence Maclin, Outstanding Breakthrough Performance winner

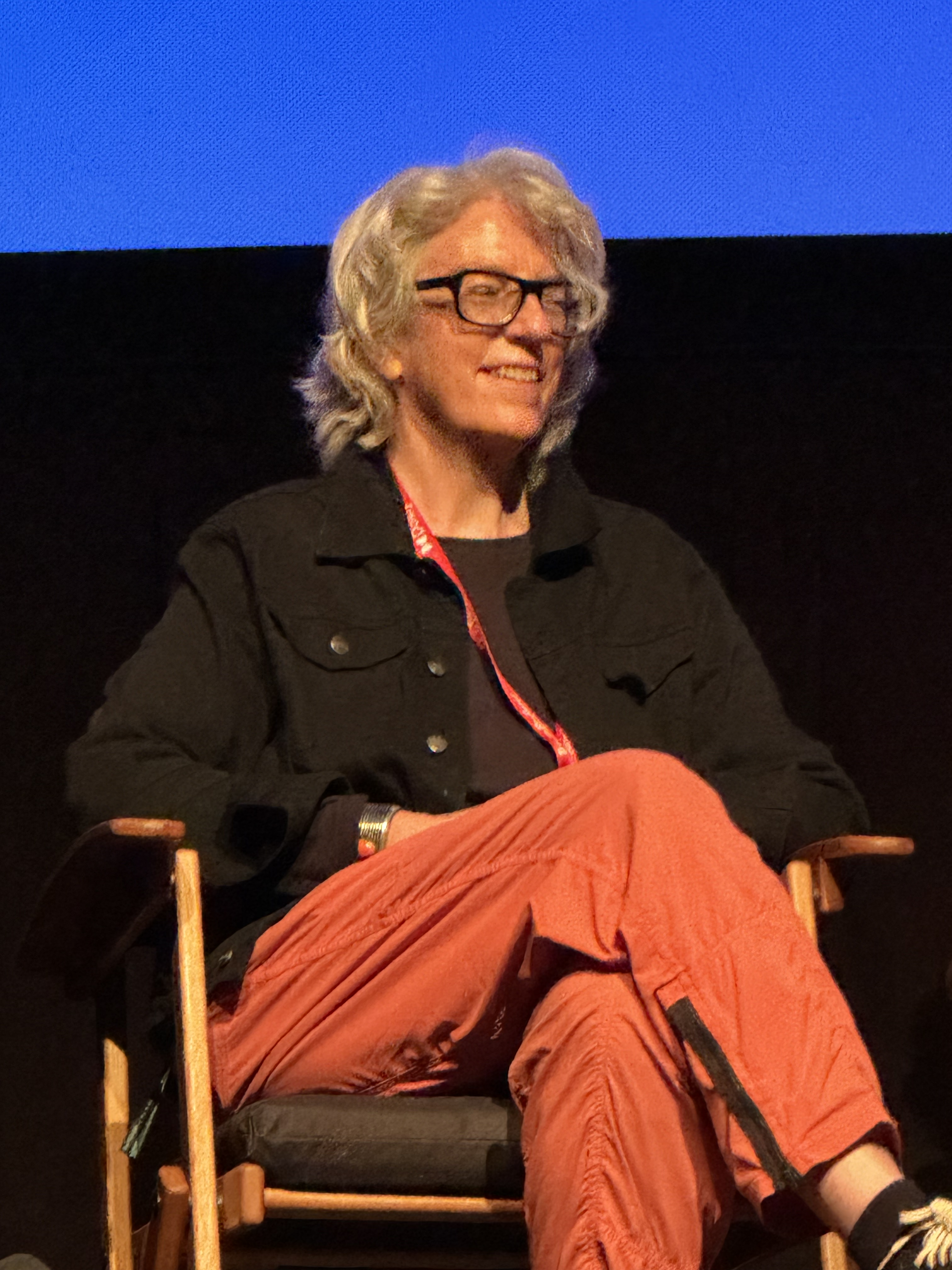
Joslyn Barnes, Outstanding Screenplay co-winner

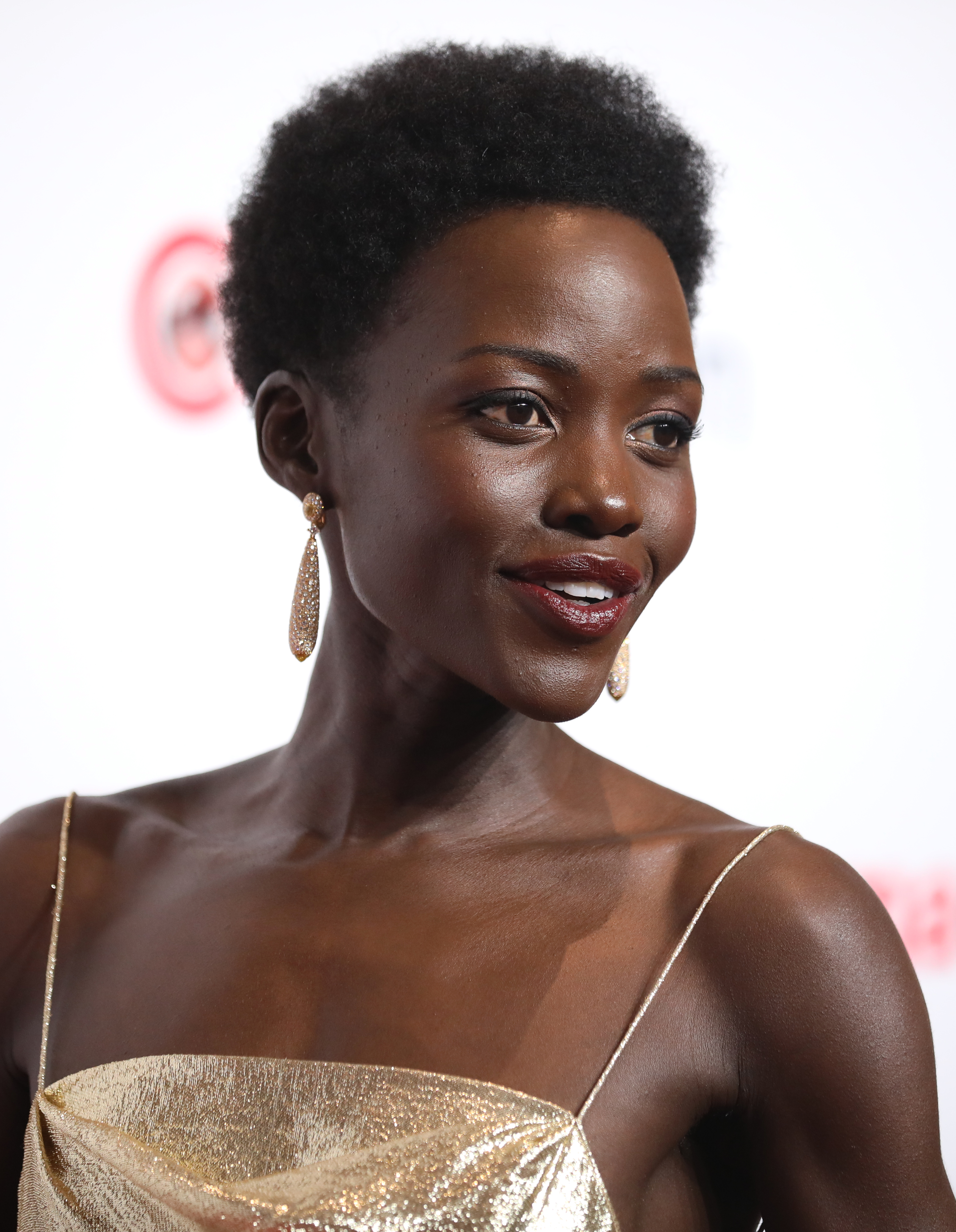
Lupita Nyong'o, Outstanding Voice Performance winner

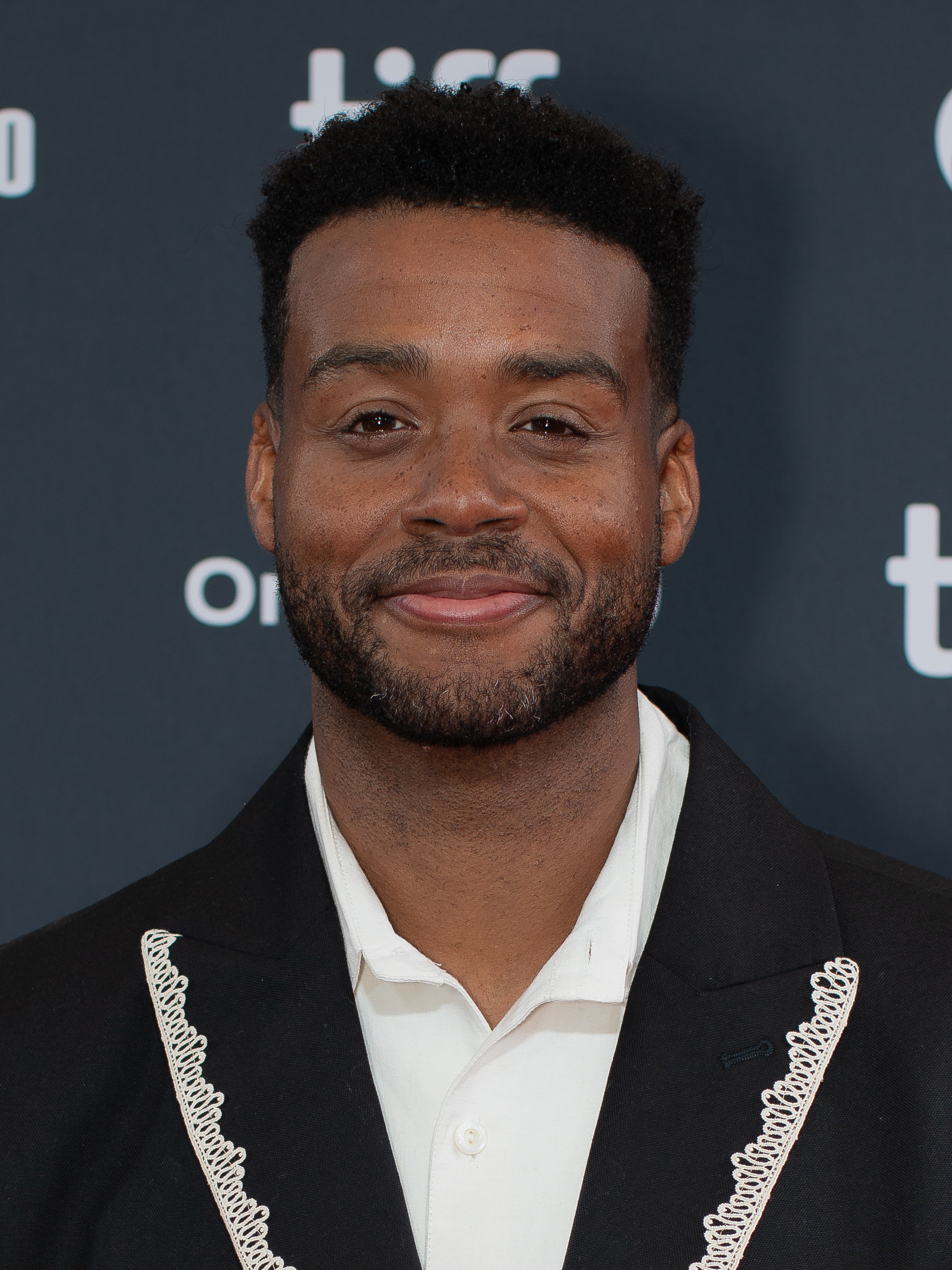
Kris Bowers, Outstanding Score winner

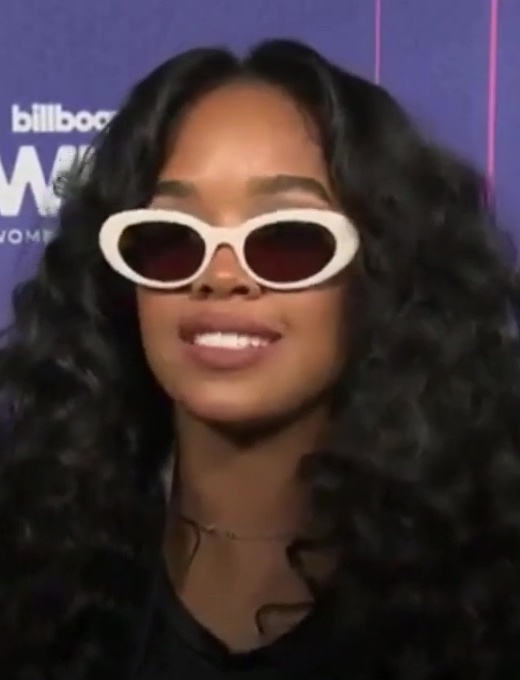
H.E.R., Outstanding Original Song co-winner

Outstanding Film	Outstanding Director
Nickel Boys – Joslyn Barnes, Dede Gardner, Jeremy Kleiner and David Levin, producers; Challengers – Luca Guadagnino, Rachel O'Connor, Amy Pascal and Zendaya, producers; Exhibiting Forgiveness – Stephanie Allain, Derek Cianfrance, Sean Cotton, Titus Kaphar and Jamie Patricof, producers; The Piano Lesson – Todd Black and Denzel Washington, producers; Sing Sing – Clint Bentley, Greg Kwedar and Monique Walton, producers	RaMell Ross – Nickel Boys; Titus Kaphar – Exhibiting Forgiveness; Zoë Kravitz – Blink Twice; Steve McQueen – Blitz; Malcolm Washington – The Piano Lesson
Outstanding Lead Performance	Outstanding Supporting Performance
Marianne Jean-Baptiste – Hard Truths as Pansy Deacon; Naomi Ackie – Blink Twice as Frida; Ryan Destiny – The Fire Inside as Claressa Shields; Colman Domingo – Sing Sing as John "Divine G" Whitfield; Cynthia Erivo – Wicked as Elphaba Thropp; André Holland – Exhibiting Forgiveness as Tarrell; Regina King – Shirley as Shirley Chisholm; John David Washington – The Piano Lesson as Boy Willie; Kerry Washington – The Six Triple Eight as Charity Adams; Zendaya – Challengers as Tashi Duncan	Danielle Deadwyler – The Piano Lesson as Berniece; Aunjanue Ellis-Taylor – Exhibiting Forgiveness as Joyce; Aunjanue Ellis-Taylor – Nickel Boys as Hattie; Brian Tyree Henry – The Fire Inside as Jason Crutchfield; Clarence Maclin – Sing Sing as himself; Lashana Lynch – Bob Marley: One Love as Rita Marley; Zoe Saldaña – Emilia Pérez as Rita Mora Castro; Jurnee Smollett – We Grown Now as Dolores; Denzel Washington – Gladiator II as Macrinus; Brandon Wilson – Nickel Boys as Turner
Outstanding Breakthrough Performance	Outstanding Ensemble
Clarence Maclin – Sing Sing as himself; Naomi Ackie – Blink Twice as Frida; Ryan Destiny – The Fire Inside as Claressa Shields; Ray Fisher – The Piano Lesson as Lymon; Elliott Heffernan – Blitz as George Hanway; Ethan Herisse – Nickel Boys as Elwood; Blake Cameron James – We Grown Now as Malik; Jharrel Jerome – Unstoppable as Anthony Robles; Lamorne Morris – Saturday Night as Garrett Morris; Brandon Wilson – Nickel Boys as Turner	The Piano Lesson – Lindsay Graham and Mary Vernieu, casting directors; Exhibiting Forgiveness – Kim Coleman, casting director; Hard Truths – Nina Gold, casting director; Nickel Boys – Victoria Thomas, casting director; Sing Sing – Greg Kwedar, casting director
Outstanding Short Film	Outstanding Documentary Feature
Chocolate with Sprinkles – Huriyyah Muhammad, director; Mosiah – Jirard, director; On a Sunday at Eleven – Alicia K. Harris, director; Self – Searit Kahsay Huluf, director; Will I See You Again? – Michael Perez-Lindsey, director	Luther: Never Too Much – Dawn Porter, director; Dahomey – Mati Diop, director; Daughters – Angela Patton and Natalie Rae, directors; Piece by Piece – Morgan Neville, director; Seeking Mavis Beacon – Jazmin Renée Jones, director
Outstanding International Film	Outstanding Independent Film
Hard Truths (United Kingdom) – Mike Leigh, director; Bird (United Kingdom) – Andrea Arnold, director; Emilia Pérez (France) – Jacques Audiard, director; Old Righteous Blues (South Africa) – Muneera Sallies, director; Nine (South Africa) – Erica Joy, director	We Grown Now – Minhal Baig, director; Albany Road – Christine Swanson, director; Blink Twice – Zoë Kravitz, director; Hard Truths – Mike Leigh, director; I Saw the TV Glow – Jane Schoenbrun, director
Outstanding Screenplay	Outstanding First Screenplay
Nickel Boys – RaMell Ross and Joslyn Barnes; Blitz – Steve McQueen; Exhibiting Forgiveness – Titus Kaphar; The Fire Inside – Barry Jenkins; The Piano Lesson – Malcolm Washington and Virgil Williams	Nickel Boys – RaMell Ross; Blink Twice – Zoë Kravitz; Exhibiting Forgiveness – Titus Kaphar; Parallel – Aldis Hodge and Edwin Hodge; The Piano Lesson – Malcolm Washington
Outstanding Emerging Director	Outstanding Voice Performance
RaMell Ross – Nickel Boys; Titus Kaphar – Exhibiting Forgiveness; Zoë Kravitz – Blink Twice; Angela Patton – Daughters; Malcolm Washington – The Piano Lesson	Lupita Nyong'o – The Wild Robot as Roz; Ayo Edebiri – Inside Out 2 as Envy; Brian Tyree Henry – Transformers One as D-16 / Megatron; Dwayne Johnson – Moana 2 as Maui; Aaron Pierre – Mufasa: The Lion King as Mufasa
Outstanding Score	Outstanding Soundtrack
The Wild Robot – Kris Bowers; Blink Twice – Chanda Dancy; Bob Marley: One Love – Kris Bowers; The Fire Inside – Tamar-kali; Saturday Night – Jon Batiste	Wicked; Bob Marley: One Love; Mufasa: The Lion King; Piece by Piece; The Wild Robot
Outstanding Original Song	Outstanding Cinematography
"The Journey" from The Six Triple Eight – H.E.R., performer; Diane Warren, writer; "Bricks" from Exhibiting Forgiveness – Andra Day, performer; Andra Day and Jherek Bischoff, writers; "El Mal" from Emilia Pérez – Zoe Saldaña, Karla Sofía Gascón and Camille, performers; Clément Ducol, Camille and Jacques Audiard, writers; "Like a Bird" from Sing Sing – Adrian Quesada and Abraham Alexander, performers; Adrian Quesada, Abraham Alexander and Brandon Marcel, writers; "Piece by Piece" from Piece by Piece – Pharrell Williams and Princess Anne High School Fabulous Marching Cavaliers, performers; Pharrell Williams, writer	Nickel Boys – Jomo Fray; Ernest Cole: Lost and Found – Wolfgang Held and Moses Tau; Luther: Never Too Much – Bryan Gentry; Rez Ball – Kira Kelly; Suncoast – Bruce Francis Cole
Outstanding Editing	Outstanding Costume Design
We Grown Now – Stephanie Filo; Daughters – Adelina Bichis and Troy Josiah Lewis; Hard Truths – Tania Reddin; Seeking Mavis Beacon – Yeelen Nelson Cohen, Jon Fine and Jazmin Renée Jones; Twisters – Terilyn A. Shropshire	Wicked – Paul Tazewell; The Book of Clarence – Antoinette Messam; The Piano Lesson – Francine Jamison-Tanchuck; Shirley – Megan Coates; We Grown Now – Courtney Wheeler
Outstanding Production Design	Outstanding Hairstyling & Makeup
The Piano Lesson – David J. Bomba, Chardae Adams and Patrick Cassidy; Nickel Boys – Nora Mendis, Elizabeth Herberg and Monique Champagne; Nine – Gilbert Ekow Ampah and Edmund Johnson	The Piano Lesson – Andrea 'Mona' Bowman and Para Shardé Malden; Bob Marley: One Love – Nadia Stacey and Carla Farmer; The Book of Clarence – Matiki Anoff, Nakoya Yancey and Wayne Jolla Jr.; Nickel Boys – Iganica Soto-Aguilar and Shandrea Williams; Shirley – Nakoya Yancey and Debi Young

== Films with multiple nominations and awards ==
The following films received multiple nominations:

Nominations	Film
13	Nickel Boys
12	The Piano Lesson
9	Exhibiting Forgiveness
7	Blink Twice
6	Sing Sing
5	The Fire Inside
5	Hard Truths
5	We Grown Now
4	Bob Marley: One Love
3	Blitz
3	Daughters
3	Emilia Pérez
3	Piece by Piece
3	Shirley
3	Wicked
3	The Wild Robot
2	The Book of Clarence
2	Challengers
2	Luther: Never Too Much
2	Mufasa: The Lion King
2	Nine
2	Saturday Night
2	Seeking Mavis Beacon
2	The Six Triple Eight

The following films received multiple awards:

Nominations	Film
6	Nickel Boys
4	The Piano Lesson
2	Hard Truths
2	We Grown Now
2	Wicked
2	The Wild Robot

== Television winners and nominees ==
=== Comedy ===
Outstanding Comedy Series
Abbott Elementary – Quinta Brunson, showrunner (ABC); The Bear – Christopher Storer, showrunner (FX); Harlem – Tracy Oliver, showrunner (Prime Video); The Residence – Paul William Davies, showrunner (Netflix); Survival of the Thickest – Danielle Sanchez-Witzel, showrunner (Netflix)
Outstanding Lead Performance in a Comedy Series	Outstanding Supporting Performance in a Comedy Series
Quinta Brunson – Abbott Elementary as Janine Teagues (ABC); Uzo Aduba – The Residence as Cordelia Cupp (Netflix); Michelle Buteau – Survival of the Thickest as Mavis Beaumont (Netflix); Ayo Edebiri – The Bear as Sydney Adamu (FX); Meagan Good – Harlem as Camille Parks (Prime Video); Delroy Lindo – UnPrisoned as Edwin Alexander (Hulu); Simone Missick – Government Cheese as Astoria Chambers (Apple TV+); David Oyelowo – Government Cheese as Hampton Chambers (Apple TV+); Natasha Rothwell – How to Die Alone as Melissa (Hulu); Kerry Washington – UnPrisoned as Paige Alexander (Hulu)	Janelle James – Abbott Elementary as Ava Coleman (ABC); Tone Bell – Survival of the Thickest as Khalil Holland (Netflix); Lionel Boyce – The Bear as Marcus Brooks (FX); William Stanford Davis – Abbott Elementary as Mr. Johnson (ABC); Colman Domingo – The Four Seasons as Danny (Netflix); Danielle Pinnock – Ghosts as Alberta Haynes (CBS); Sheryl Lee Ralph – Abbott Elementary as Barbara Howard (ABC); Susan Kelechi Watson – The Residence as Jasmine Haney (Netflix); Jessica Williams – Shrinking as Gaby (Apple TV+); Tyler James Williams – Abbott Elementary as Gregory Eddie (ABC)
Outstanding Guest Performance in a Comedy Series
Cynthia Erivo – Poker Face as the Kazinsky sisters (Peacock); Garcelle Beauvais – Survival of the Thickest as Natasha Karina (Netflix); Giancarlo Esposito – Poker Face as Fred Finch (Peacock); Orlando Jones – Abbott Elementary as Martin Eddie (ABC); Zoë Kravitz – The Studio as herself (Apple TV+); Da'Vine Joy Randolph – Only Murders in the Building as Donna Williams (Hulu); Maya Rudolph – Saturday Night Live as Kamala Harris (NBC); Cree Summer – Abbott Elementary as Rosalyn Inez (ABC); Robert Townsend – The Bear as Emmanuel Adamu (FX); Damon Wayans Jr. – Shrinking as Derrick #2 (Apple TV+)
Outstanding Directing in a Comedy Series	Outstanding Writing in a Comedy Series
The Bear ("Napkins") – directed by Ayo Edebiri (FX); Abbott Elementary ("The Science Fair") – directed by Tyler James Williams (ABC); The Four Seasons ("Ultimate Frisbee") – directed by Colman Domingo (Netflix); Shrinking ("In a Lonely Place") – directed by Randall Winston (Apple TV+); Survival of the Thickest ("Mind Ya Business, Bitch!") – directed by Tasha Smith (Netflix)	Abbott Elementary ("Audit") – written by Ava Coleman (ABC); Abbott Elementary ("Karaoke") – written by Brittani Nichols (ABC); Hacks ("Cover Girls") – written by Samantha Riley (HBO Max); Shrinking ("Changing Patterns") – written by Ashley Nicole Black (Apple TV+); Survival of the Thickest ("It's Not A Mo'Ment, It's A Movement, Bitch!") – written by Michelle Buteau (Netflix)

=== Drama ===
Outstanding Drama Series
Paradise – Dan Fogelman, showrunner (Hulu); Cross – Ben Watkins, showrunner (Prime Video); Forever – Mara Brock Akil, showrunner (Netflix); Godfather of Harlem – Chris Brancato, showrunner (MGM+); Reasonable Doubt – Raamla Mohamed, showrunner (Hulu)
Outstanding Lead Performance in a Drama Series	Outstanding Supporting Performance in a Drama Series
Sterling K. Brown – Paradise as Xavier Collins (Hulu); Jacob Anderson – Interview with the Vampire as Louis de Pointe du Lac (AMC); Michael Cooper Jr. – Forever as Justin Edwards (Netflix); Emayatzy Corinealdi – Reasonable Doubt as Jax Stewart (Hulu); Aldis Hodge – Cross as Alex Cross (Prime Video); Lashana Lynch – The Day of the Jackal as Bianca Pullman (Peacock); Patina Miller – Power Book III: Raising Kanan as Raq Thomas (Starz); Harold Perrineau – From as Boyd Stevens (MGM+); Zoe Saldaña – Lioness as Joe McNamara (Paramount+); Lovie Simone – Forever as Keisha Clark (Netflix)	Wood Harris – Forever as Eric Edwards (Netflix); Laz Alonso – The Boys as Mother's Milk (Prime Video); Rome Flynn – Godfather of Harlem as Frank Lucas (Hulu); Tracy Ifeachor – The Pitt as Dr. Heather Collins (HBO Max); Skye P. Marshall – Matlock as Olympia Lawrence (CBS); Isaiah Mustafa – Cross as John Sampson (Prime Video); Karen Pittman – Forever as Dawn Edwards (Netflix); Natasha Rothwell – The White Lotus as Belinda Lindsey (HBO); Daniel Sunjata – High Potential as Adam Karadec (ABC); Tramell Tillman – Severance as Seth Milchick (Apple TV+)
Outstanding Guest Performance in a Drama Series
Glynn Turman – Paradise as Fred Collins (Hulu); Will Catlett – Forever as Quincy Clark (Netflix); Tati Gabrielle – The Last of Us as Nora (HBO); David Alan Grier – Elsbeth as Arthur Greene Jr. (CBS); Aldis Hodge – Leverage: Redemption as Alec Hardison (Prime Video); April Parker Jones – Bel-Air as Vy Smith (Peacock); Karen Robinson – Cross as Miss Nancy (Prime Video); Marlon Wayans – Bel-Air as Lou (Peacock); Vanessa Williams – Elsbeth as Roslyn Bridwell (CBS); Jeffrey Wright – The Last of Us as Isaac (HBO)
Outstanding Directing in a Drama Series	Outstanding Writing in a Drama Series
Forever ("Forever...") – directed by Regina King (Netflix); Cross ("Happy Birthday") – directed by Director X (Prime Video); Cross ("Hero Complex") – directed by Nzingha Stewart (Prime Video); Paradise ("In the Palaces of Crowned Kings") – directed by Hanelle Culpepper (Hulu); The Pitt ("7:00 P.M.") – directed by Damian Marcano (HBO Max)	Paradise ("The Architect of Social Well-Being") – written by Jason Wilborn (Hulu); Forever ("Forever...") – written by Mara Brock Akil and Danya Hu (Netflix); Forever ("The Vineyard") – written by Norman Vance Jr. (Netflix); Interview with the Vampire ("I Want You More Than Anything in the World") – written by Coline Abert and A. Zell Williams (AMC); The Pitt ("12:00 P.M.") – written by Cynthia Adarkwa (HBO Max)

=== Television Movie or Limited Series ===
Outstanding Television Movie or Limited Series
Rebel Ridge – Jeremy Saulnier, Vincent Savino, and Anish Savjani, producers (Netflix); Dope Thief – Peter Craig, showrunner (Apple TV+); The Emperor of Ocean Park – Sherman Payne, showrunner (MGM+); Fight Night: The Million Dollar Heist – Shaye Ogbonna, showrunner (Peacock); The Supremes at Earl's All-You-Can-Eat – Marty Bowen, Wyck Godfrey, and Isaac Klausner, producers (Hulu)
Outstanding Lead Performance in a TV Movie/Limited Series	Outstanding Supporting Performance in a TV Movie/Limited Series
Aaron Pierre – Rebel Ridge as Terry Richmond (Netflix); Uzo Aduba – The Supremes at Earl's All-You-Can-Eat as Clarice (Hulu); Viola Davis – G20 as Danielle Sutton (Prime Video); Colman Domingo – The Madness as Muncie Daniels (Netflix); Aunjanue Ellis-Taylor – The Supremes at Earl's All-You-Can-Eat as Odette (Hulu); Laurence Fishburne – Clipped as Doc Rivers (FX); Brian Tyree Henry – Dope Thief as Ray Driscoll (Apple TV+); André Holland – The Big Cigar as Huey P. Newton (Apple TV+); Rashida Jones – Black Mirror as Amanda (Netflix); Ruth Negga – Presumed Innocent as Barbara Sabich (Apple TV+)	Rhenzy Feliz – The Penguin as Victor Aguilar (HBO); Don Cheadle – Fight Night: The Million Dollar Heist as J.D. Hudson (Peacock); O-T Fagbenle – Presumed Innocent as Nico Della Guardia (Apple TV+); Taraji P. Henson – Fight Night: The Million Dollar Heist as Vivian Thomas (Peacock); Samuel L. Jackson – Fight Night: The Million Dollar Heist as Frank Moten (Peacock); Tiffany Mack – The Emperor of Ocean Park as Mariah Garland-Denton (MGM+); Issa Rae – Black Mirror as Brandy (Netflix); Tracee Ellis Ross – Black Mirror as Gaynor (Netflix); Ashley Walters – Adolescence as Luke Bascombe (Netflix); Forest Whitaker – The Emperor of Ocean Park as Oliver Garland (MGM+)
Outstanding Directing in a TV Movie or Limited Series	Outstanding Writing in a TV Movie or Limited Series
The Penguin ("Top Hat") – directed by Kevin Bray (HBO); Aaron Hernandez: American Sports Story ("Birthday Money") – directed by Paris Barclay (FX); Dope Thief ("Run, Die, or Relapse") – directed by Tanya Hamilton (Apple TV+); The Emperor of Ocean Park ("Chapter One") – directed by Damian Marcano (MGM+); Get Millie Black ("Janet") – directed by Annetta Laufer (HBO)	The Penguin ("Inside Man") – written by Erika L. Johnson (HBO); Fight Night: The Million Dollar Heist ("Round Two: Fight Night") – written by Shaye Ogbonna (Peacock); Lady in the Lake ("Innocence leaves when you discover cruelty. First in others, then in yourself.") – written by Nambi E. Kelley (Apple TV+); Get Millie Black ("Janet") – written by Lydia Adetunji (HBO); The Supremes at Earl's All-You-Can-Eat – written by Cee Marcellus and Tina Mabry (Hulu)

=== Other programs ===
Outstanding Documentary	Outstanding Variety, Sketch, or Talk – Series or Special
Number One on the Call Sheet – directed by Reginald Hudlin and Shola Lynch (Apple TV+); Black Barbie: A Documentary – directed by Lagueria Davis (Netflix); Hollywood Black – directed by Justin Simien (MGM+); Simone Biles Rising – directed by Katie Walsh (Netflix); Sly Lives! (aka The Burden of Black Genius) – directed by Ahmir "Questlove" Thompson (Hulu)	The Apple Music Super Bowl LIX Halftime Show starring Kendrick Lamar (FOX); NFL 2024 Christmas Day Halftime Show starring Beyoncé (Netflix); Jamie Foxx: What Had Happened Was... (Netflix); Michelle Buteau: A Buteau-ful Mind at Radio City Music Hall (Netflix); Roy Wood Jr.: Lonely Flowers (Hulu)

=== Music categories ===
Outstanding Musical Score	Outstanding Music Supervision
Forever – Gary Gunn (Netflix); Bridgerton – Kris Bowers (Netflix); Cross – Ali Shaheed Muhammad and Adrian Younge (Prime Video); Supacell – Sillkey (Netflix); The Supremes at Earl's All-You-Can-Eat – Kathryn Bostic (Hulu)	Harlem – Megan Francoeur (Prime Video); All American: Homecoming – Aamina Gant (The CW); The Family Business: New Orleans – Rico Love (BET+); Found – Madonna Wade-Reed (NBC); Power Book II: Ghost – Derryck "Big Tank" Thornton (Starz)
Outstanding Original Song
"Power of Two" from Star Wars: The Acolyte – written by Victoria Monét, Michael Abels, and D'Mile; performed by Victoria Monét (Disney+); "Crown Don't Make You King" from Godfather of Harlem – written by Conway the Machine, Teddy Sinclair, Avery Chambliss, Swizz Beatz, and William Sinclair; performed by Conway the Machine and Teddy Sinclair (MGM+); "Get Down (Main Theme Song)" from Government Cheese – written and performed by Pharrell Williams (Apple TV+); "Patient" from Forever – written by Larry "Price" Jacks, Larrance "Rance 1500" Dopson, and Marcus "Seige Monstracity" White; performed by Larry "Price" Jacks (Netflix); "Tomorrow's Interlude" from Forever – written by Halle Burnett, Ben Finkelstein, Max Mendelsohn, Paul Luke Bonenfant, Riley Daggs, and Yasin Akil; performed by Until Tomorrow and Halle Burnett (Netflix)

=== Technical categories ===
Outstanding Cinematography	Outstanding Costume Design
Fight Night: The Million Dollar Heist ("Round Eight: Testify") – Michael Watson (Peacock); All American: Homecoming ("Ready or Not") – Hans Charles (The CW); The Equalizer ("Slay Ride") – Terrence Laron Burke (CBS); The Lion King at the Hollywood Bowl – Cameron Barnett (Disney+); Supacell ("Michael") – Aaron Reid (Netflix)	Harlem – Anitra Michelle (Prime Video); Descendants: The Rise of Red – Emilio Sosa and Julia Caston (Disney+); NFL 2024 Christmas Day Halftime Show starring Beyoncé – Shiona Turini (Netflix); The Supremes at Earl's All-You-Can-Eat – Whitney Anne Adams (Hulu); Survival of the Thickest – Keia Bounds (Netflix)
Outstanding Editing	Outstanding Makeup & Hairstyling
Daredevil: Born Again ("Isle of Joy") – Stephanie Filo; Fight Night: The Million Dollar Heist ("Round Three: Black Vegas") – Felicia Mignon Livingston; Get Millie Black ("Millie") – Tania Reddin; Grotesquerie ("In Dreams") – Shannon Baker Davis; How to Die Alone ("Stop Living") – Daysha Broadway	The Penguin – Brian Badie; NFL 2024 Christmas Day Halftime Show starring Beyoncé – Jarad Reed and Natasha Marcelina; Fight Night: The Million Dollar Heist – Nominees TBD; Harlem – Yancey Edwards and Bethany Townes; The Supremes at Earl's All-You-Can-Eat – Andrea Jackson and Dionne Wynn
Outstanding Production Design
Government Cheese – Warren Alan Young; Beyond Black Beauty – Nicole Simmons; The Big Cigar – Warren Alan Young

== Programs with multiple nominations and awards ==
The following programs received multiple nominations:

Nominations	Program
12	Forever
11	Abbott Elementary
8	Fight Night: The Million Dollar Heist
7	Cross
7	The Supremes at Earl's All-You-Can-Eat
7	Survival of the Thickest
5	The Bear
5	Harlem
5	Paradise
4	The Emperor of Ocean Park
4	Government Cheese
4	The Penguin
4	Shrinking
3	Beyoncé 2024 NFL Halftime Show
3	Black Mirror
3	Dope Thief
3	Get Millie Black
3	Godfather of Harlem
3	The Pitt
3	The Residence
2	All American: Homecoming
2	Bel-Air
2	The Big Cigar
2	Elsbeth
2	The Four Seasons
2	How to Die Alone
2	Interview with the Vampire
2	The Last of Us
2	Poker Face
2	Presumed Innocent
2	Reasonable Doubt
2	Rebel Ridge
2	Supacell
2	UnPrisoned

The following programs received multiple awards:

Wins	Program
4	Abbott Elementary
4	Paradise
4	The Penguin
3	Forever
2	Harlem
2	Rebel Ridge
