= Black Reel Award for Outstanding Supporting Performance =

Film award for supporting actor at the Black Reel Awards

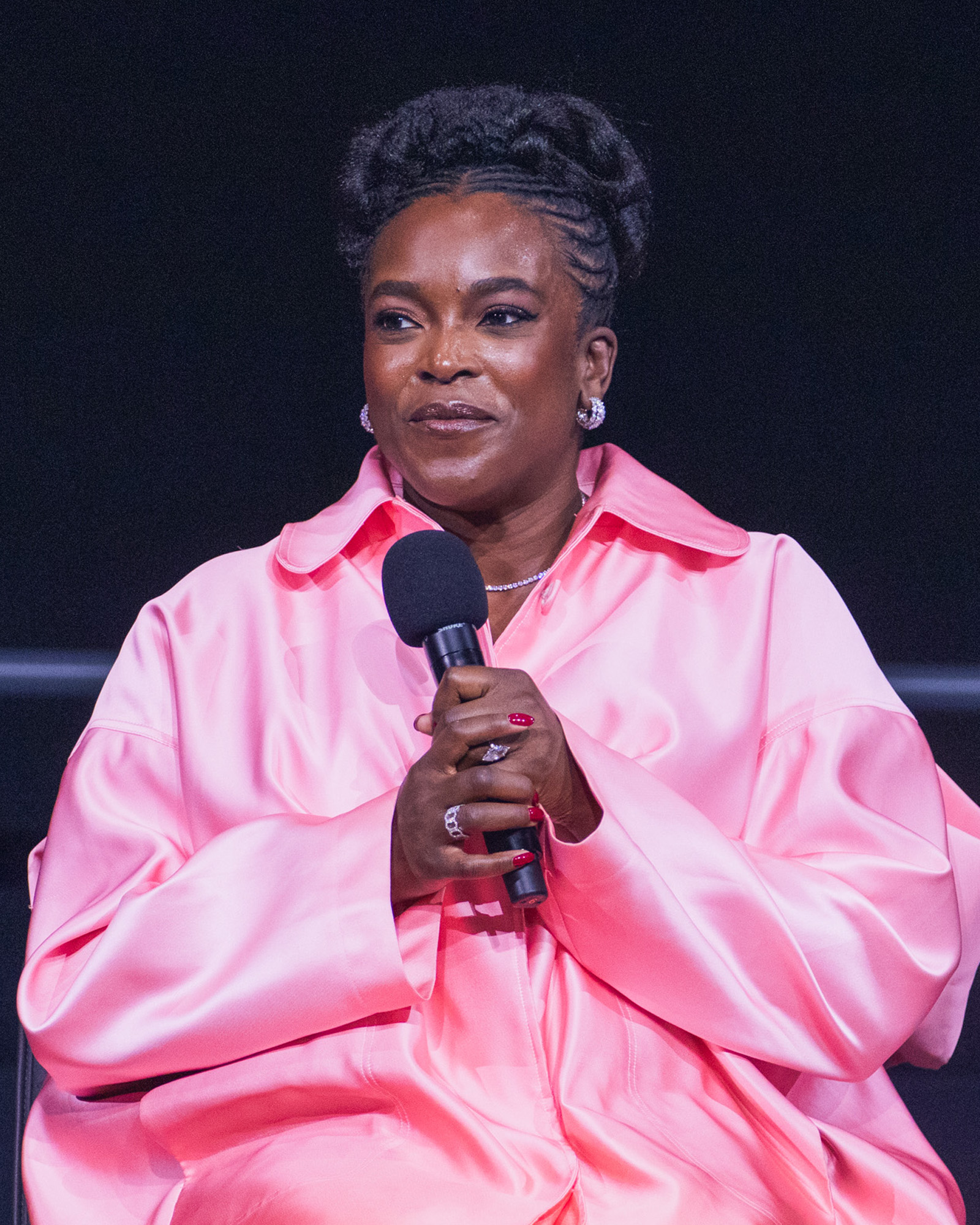
- The 2026 recipient: Wunmi Mosaku
- Awarded for: Outstanding Performance
- Country: United States
- Presented by: Black Reel Awards (BRAs)
- First award: 2024
- Most recent winner: Wunmi Mosaku; Sinners
- Website: blackreelawards.com

This article lists the winners and nominees for the Black Reel Award for Outstanding Supporting Performance. The award recognizes an actor or actress who delivers an outstanding performance in a supporting role within the given eligible period.

The award was first presented at the 24th Annual Black Reel Awards as a result of a merger between the Outstanding Supporting Actor and Outstanding Supporting Actress awards into a single gender-neutral award, with a total of ten nominees being selected. Danielle Brooks is the inaugural winner for her performance in The Color Purple, for which she was also nominated at the Academy Awards.

== Winners and nominees ==
=== 2020s ===
Year	Actor	Role(s)	Film
2024
2024	Danielle Brooks	Sofia	The Color Purple
2024	Erika Alexander	Coraline	American Fiction
2024	Sterling K. Brown	Clifford "Cliff" Ellison	American Fiction
2024	Viola Davis	Deloris Jordan	Air
2024	Colman Domingo	Albert "Mister" Johnson	The Color Purple
2024	Taraji P. Henson	Shug Avery	The Color Purple
2024	Jamie Foxx	Slick Charles	They Cloned Tyrone
2024	Jonathan Majors	Damian Anderson	Creed III
2024	Da'Vine Joy Randolph	Mary Lamb	The Holdovers
2024	Jurnee Smollett	Mame Downes	The Burial
2025
2025	Danielle Deadwyler	Berniece	The Piano Lesson
2025	Aunjanue Ellis-Taylor	Joyce	Exhibiting Forgiveness
2025	Aunjanue Ellis-Taylor	Hattie	Nickel Boys
2025	Brian Tyree Henry	Jason Crutchfield	The Fire Inside
2025	Clarence Maclin	Himself	Sing Sing
2025	Lashana Lynch	Rita Marley	Bob Marley: One Love
2025	Zoe Saldaña	Rita Mora Castro	Emilia Pérez
2025	Jurnee Smollett	Dolores	We Grown Now
2025	Denzel Washington	Macrinus	Gladiator II
2025	Brandon Wilson	Turner	Nickel Boys
2026
2026	Wunmi Mosaku	Annie	Sinners
2026	Miles Caton	Samuel "Sammie" Moore	Sinners
2026	Regina Hall	Deandra	One Battle After Another
2026	Damson Idris	Joshua Pearce	F1
2026	David Jonsson	Peter "Pete" McVries	The Long Walk
2026	Delroy Lindo	Delta Slim	Sinners
2026	Da'Vine Joy Randolph	Anna	Eternity
2026	ASAP Rocky	Archie/Yung Felon	Highest 2 Lowest
2026	Teyana Taylor	Perfidia Beverly Hills	One Battle After Another
2026	Jeffrey Wright	Paul Christopher	Highest 2 Lowest

== Multiple nominations ==
2 nominations

- Aunjanue Ellis-Taylor
- Da'Vine Joy Randolph
- Jurnee Smollett

== Multiple nominations from the same film ==
- Erika Alexander and Sterling K. Brown in American Fiction (2024)
- Danielle Brooks (winner), Colman Domingo, and Taraji P. Henson in The Color Purple (2024)
- Aunjanue Ellis-Taylor and Brandon Wilson in Nickel Boys (2025)
- ASAP Rocky and Jeffrey Wright in Highest 2 Lowest (2026)
- Regina Hall and Teyana Taylor in One Battle After Another (2026)
- Miles Caton, Delroy Lindo, and Wunmi Mosaku (winner) in Sinners (2026)

== Age superlatives ==
Record	Actor	Film	Age (in years)
Oldest winner	Danielle Deadwyler	The Piano Lesson	42
Oldest nominee	Delroy Lindo	Sinners	73
Youngest winner	Danielle Brooks	The Color Purple	34
Youngest nominee	Miles Caton	Sinners	20
