= Black Reel Award for Outstanding Breakthrough Performance =

Film award for breakthrough performance

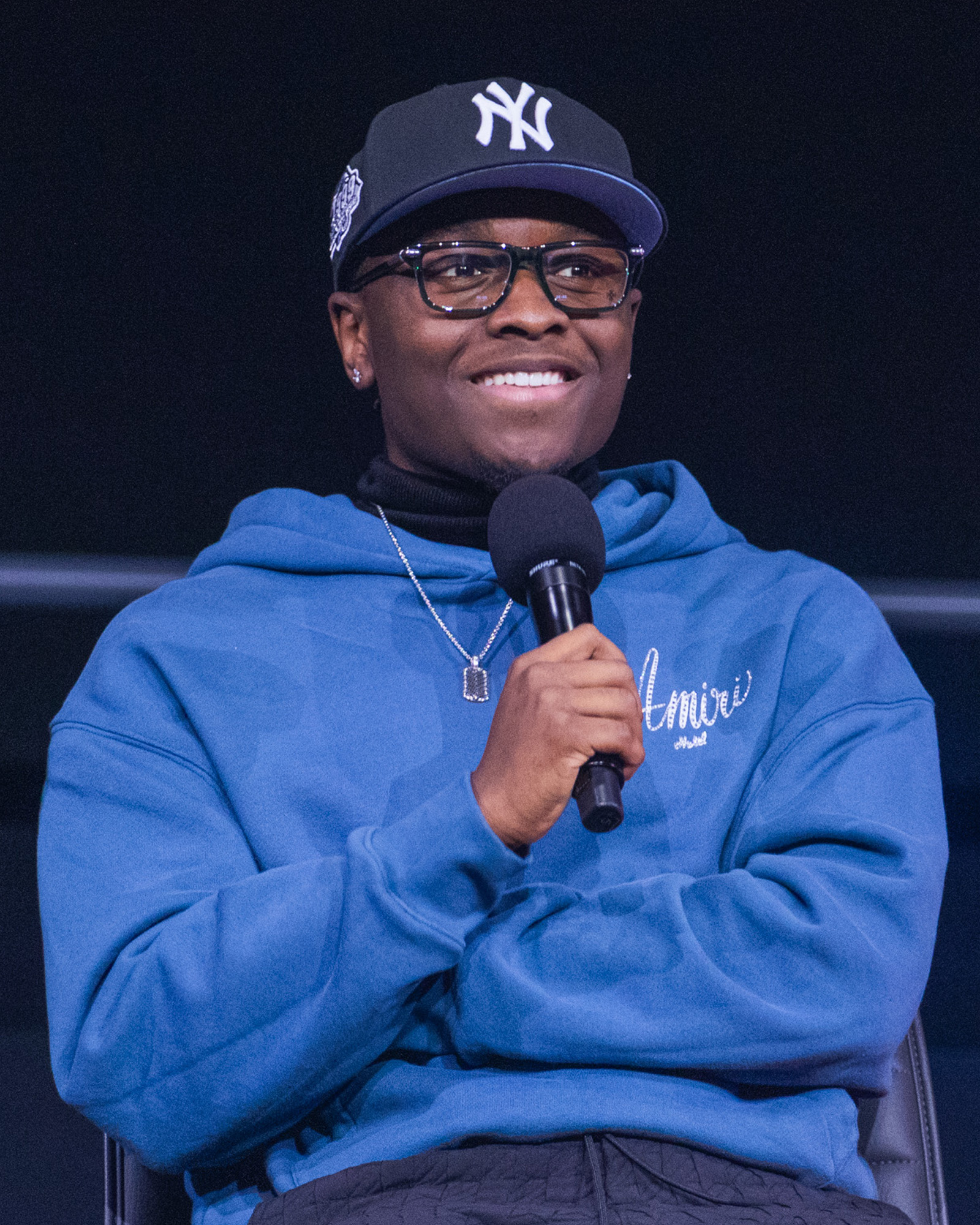
- The 2025 recipient: Miles Caton
- Country: United States
- Presented by: The Black Reel Awards (BRAs)
- First award: 2024
- Most recent winner: Miles Caton; Sinners (2026)
- Website: blackreelawards.com

This article lists the winners and nominees for the Black Reel Award for Outstanding Breakthrough Performance. Academy Award-nominated or winning performances also honored with nominations or wins at the Black Reel Awards include Jennifer Hudson (Dreamgirls), Octavia Spencer (The Help), Quvenzhané Wallis (Beasts of the Southern Wild) and Gabourey Sidibe (Precious).

During the 2014 ceremony, the category was divided into gender-specific categories (Outstanding Breakthrough Performance, Male and Outstanding Breakthrough Performance, Female). At the 2024 ceremony, the category was reintegrated into a single award and expanded to include ten nominees.

== Winners and nominees ==
Winners are listed first and highlighted in bold.

=== 2000s ===
Year	Actor / Actress	Film	Ref
2003
2003	**Derek Luke**	**Antwone Fisher**	
2003	Beyoncé	Austin Powers in Goldmember	
2003	Nick Cannon	Drumline	
2003	Raven Goodwin	Lovely & Amazing	
2003	Lil' Bow Wow	Like Mike	
2004
2004	**Naomie Harris**	**28 Days Later**	
2004	Romeo Miller	Honey	
2004	Wentworth Miller	The Human Stain	
2005
2005	**Sharon Warren**	**Ray**	
2005	Anthony Mackie	She Hate Me	
2005	C.J. Sanders	Ray	
2006
2006	**Brandon T. Jackson**	**Roll Bounce**	
2006	Ashanti	Coach Carter	
2006	Tyler Perry	Diary of a Mad Black Woman	
2007
2007	**Jennifer Hudson**	**Dreamgirls**	
2007	Shareeka Epps	Half Nelson	
2007	Keke Palmer	Akeelah and the Bee	
2007	Paula Patton	Déjà Vu	
2007	Jaden Smith	The Pursuit of Happyness	
2008
2008	**Dev Patel**	**Slumdog Millionaire**	
2008	Omar Benson Miller	Miracle at St. Anna	
2008	Columbus Short	Cadillac Records	
2008	Saïd Taghmaoui	Traitor	
2008	Tristan Wilds	The Secret Life of Bees	

=== 2010s ===
Year	Actor / Actress	Film	Ref
2010
2010	**Gabourey Sidibe**	**Precious**	
2010	Quinton Aaron	The Blind Side	
2010	Nicole Beharie	American Violet	
2010	Souléymane Sy Savané	Goodbye Solo	
2010	Jamal Woolard	Notorious	
2011
2011	**Tessa Thompson**	**For Colored Girls**	
2011	Amari Cheatom	Night Catches Us	
2011	Yaya DaCosta	The Kids Are All Right	
2011	Omari Hardwick	For Colored Girls	
2011	Zoë Kravitz	It's Kind of a Funny Story	
2012
2012	**Adepero Oduye**	**Pariah**	
2012	John Boyega	Attack the Block	
2012	Gugu Mbatha-Raw	Larry Crowne	
2012	Octavia Spencer	The Help	
2012	Kim Wayans	Pariah	
2013
2013	**Quvenzhané Wallis**	**Beasts of the Southern Wild**	
2013	Emayatzy Corinealdi	Middle of Nowhere	
2013	Dwight Henry	Beasts of the Southern Wild	
2013	Amandla Stenberg	The Hunger Games	
2013	Omar Sy	The Intouchables	

=== 2020s ===
Year	Actor / Actress	Film	Ref
2024
2024	**Fantasia Barrino**	**The Color Purple**	
2024	Halle Bailey	The Little Mermaid	
2024	Danielle Brooks	The Color Purple	
2024	Jerrod Carmichael	Poor Things	
2024	Archie Madekwe	Gran Turismo	
2024	Phylicia Pearl Mpasi	The Color Purple	
2024	Tia Nomore	Earth Mama	
2024	Vivian Oparah	Rye Lane	
2024	Dewayne Perkins	The Blackening	
2024	Teyana Taylor	A Thousand and One	
2025
2025	**Clarence Maclin**	**Sing Sing**	
2025	Naomi Ackie	Blink Twice	
2025	Ryan Destiny	The Fire Inside	
2025	Ray Fisher	The Piano Lesson	
2025	Elliott Heffernan	Blitz	
2025	Ethan Herisse	Nickel Boys	
2025	Blake Cameron James	We Grown Now	
2025	Jharrel Jerome	Unstoppable	
2025	Lamorne Morris	Saturday Night	
2025	Brandon Wilson	Nickel Boys	
2026
2026	**Miles Caton**	**Sinners**	
2026	Susan Chardy	On Becoming a Guinea Fowl	
2026	Naya Desir-Johnson	Sarah's Oil	
2026	Damson Idris	F1	
2026	Chase Infiniti	One Battle After Another	
2026	Jayme Lawson	Sinners	
2026	Abou Sangaré	Souleymane's Story	
2026	SZA	One of Them Days	
2026	ASAP Rocky	Highest 2 Lowest	
2026	Tyriq Withers	Him	
