= Louverture Films =

American film production company

- Industry: Film industry
- Founder: Danny Glover; Joslyn Barnes
- Headquarters: New York, New York, U.S.
- Area served: United States
- Website: louverturefilms.com

Louverture Films is an American independent film and television production company founded in 2005 by Danny Glover and Joslyn Barnes. The company is known for producing Bamako (2006), Salt of this Sea (2008), Uncle Boonmee Who Can Recall His Past Lives (2010), The House I Live In (2012), Strong Island (2017), Capernaum (2018), Hale County This Morning, This Evening (2018), Prayers for the Stolen (2021), and Nickel Boys (2024).

== History ==
In 2005, Danny Glover and Joslyn Barnes co-founded the company, named after Haitian revolutionary Toussaint Louverture, with a focus on producing films worldwide. Susan Rockefeller, Tony Tabatznik, Sawsan Asfari and Jeffrey Lewis Clark serve as principal partners. Maya E. Rudolph serves as vice president of non-fiction.

In January 2022, it was announced Louverture would additionally produce animation, games, and television projects.

In June 2024, it was announced Glover would step down as CEO, with Melony Lewis and Adam Lewis joining as principal partners.

== Filmography ==
- Bamako (2006)
- Africa Unite (2007)
- Trouble the Water (2008)
- Salt of this Sea (2008)
- Soundtrack for a Revolution (2009)
- The Time That Remains (2009)
- Uncle Boonmee Who Can Recall His Past Lives (2010)
- The Disappearance of McKinley Nolan (2010)
- The Black Power Mixtape 1967–1975 (2011)
- Dum Maaro Dum (2011)
- Highway (2012)
- The House I Live In (2012)
- The Welcome Table Project (2013)
- Concerning Violence - Nine Scenes From the Anti-imperialistic Self-Defense (2014)
- The Narrow Frame of Midnight (2014)
- This Changes Everything (2015)
- Cemetery of Splendour (2015)
- Shadow World (2016)
- White Sun (2016)
- Strong Island (2017)
- Sollers Point (2017)
- Zama (2017)
- That Summer (2017)
- Hale County This Morning, This Evening (2018)
- Capernaum (2018)
- Angels Are Made of Light (2018)
- Aquarela (2018)
- Easter Snap (2019)
- Gunda (2020)
- Crane Lantern (2021)
- President (2021)
- Prayers for the Stolen (2021)
- Memoria (2021)
- Eami (2022)
- The Tuba Thieves (2023)
- The Teacher (2023)
- Bitteroot (2024)
- Harvest (2024)
- Nickel Boys (2024)
- Edward Said: Between Worlds (2026)
