= Yance Ford =

American producer and director

- Yance Ford at the 2017 Montclair Film Festival
- Education: Hamilton College
- Occupations: Director, film producer

Yance Ford (/ˈjænsi/) is an American producer and director.

== Life and career ==
Ford graduated from Hamilton College in 1994.

He worked as a series producer at PBS for ten years, starting in 2002.

In 2011, he was named one of Filmmaker magazine's 25 New Faces of Independent Film. He also received the 2011–2012 Fledgling Fund Fellowship at MacDowell.

In 2017, he was #97 on The Root 100, an "annual list of the most influential African Americans, ages 25 to 45."

In August 2025, he was named as the Visiting Artistic Director for the 2026 edition of True/False, the preeminent international non-fiction documentary festival in Columbia, Missouri.

== Strong Island and other works ==
In 2018, Ford and Joslyn Barnes were nominated for the Academy Award for Best Documentary Feature for producing and directing Strong Island, a film about the 1992 murder of Ford's brother. As such, he became the first openly transgender man to be nominated for any Academy Award, and the first openly transgender director to be nominated for any Academy Award. Also in 2018, he and Barnes were awarded an Emmy for Exceptional Merit in Documentary Filmmaking for producing Strong Island, which made him the first openly transgender man and the first Black openly transgender person to win an Emmy award. He was also the first openly transgender filmmaker to win a Creative Arts Emmy.

He has also received a Creative Capital Award, and a Sundance Documentary Film Program Fellowship.

In 2019, Ford was awarded a Guggenheim Fellowship.

Ford directed an episode of the 2020 documentary series, Trial By Media, titled "Blago!", about the media furor over the court case against Governor of Illinois Rod Blagojevich.

In 2024, Ford released the documentary film Power, a Netflix original film, at the 2024 Sundance Film Festival.

== See also ==
- List of LGBT firsts by year
- List of LGBT Academy Award winners and nominees
- List of transgender film and television directors
