= The Way Back (2020 film) =

2020 American sports-drama film directed by Gavin O'Connor

- Theatrical release poster
- Directed by: Gavin O'Connor
- Written by: Brad Ingelsby
- Produced by: Gordon Gray; Jennifer Todd; Gavin O'Connor; Ravi Mehta
- Starring: Ben Affleck; Al Madrigal; Michaela Watkins; Janina Gavankar
- Cinematography: Eduard Grau
- Edited by: David Rosenbloom
- Music by: Rob Simonsen
- Production companies: Warner Bros. Pictures; Bron Creative; Mayhem Pictures; Film Tribe
- Distributed by: Warner Bros. Pictures
- Release date: March 6, 2020
- Running time: 108 minutes
- Country: United States
- Language: English
- Budget: $21–25 million
- Box office: $15.5 million

The Way Back (titled Finding the Way Back in the United Kingdom and Ireland) is a 2020 American sports drama film directed by Gavin O'Connor and written by Brad Ingelsby. It stars Ben Affleck in the main role, Al Madrigal, Michaela Watkins, and Janina Gavankar, and follows an alcoholic construction worker who is recruited to become head coach of the basketball team at the high school where he was a star.

The film was theatrically released in the United States on March 6, 2020, by Warner Bros. Pictures. In response to the COVID-19 pandemic causing cinemas across the globe to close, Warner Bros. made the film available to own digitally on March 24, 2020. The film received generally positive reviews from critics, with Affleck's performance receiving praise. However, the film suffered at the box office due to COVID-19 because it was only in theaters for two weeks.

== Plot ==
Jack Cunningham is an alcoholic ironworker who is separated from his wife, Angela. While at Thanksgiving dinner with his family, they express concern about his habits.

The next day, Jack receives a call from Father Devine at his former Catholic high school, Bishop Hayes. He asks him to coach the basketball team, as the previous coach has had a heart attack. Introduced to assistant coach and algebra teacher Dan and the team members, Jack learns that the school hasn't been in the playoffs since he was a student. Interest has waned, and there are only six varsity players.

Initially annoyed by Jack's stricter practices and attitude, the players soon grow to respect him. Jack and Angela attend a birthday party for David, the son of their friend Miguel. It is revealed that their son Michael had died from cancer. David and Michael met in the hospital, and David is now in remission.

Affected by the birthday party and memories of his son, Jack protests a call at a game, which results in him being ejected. Afterwards, he reveals to a player that his father only paid attention to him due to his basketball talent. As a result, Jack turned down a full athletic scholarship to the basketball program at the University of Kansas and hasn't played since.

The team's final game of the season is a rematch with Memorial, the top-ranked team. Bishop Hayes wins to clinch a playoff berth. Later, Angela calls Jack to tell him that David has been hospitalized. When they learn that David's cancer has returned, Jack begins drinking again.

The following morning, he arrives late and drunk to practice. Dan informs Father Devine, who fires Jack. One night, while driving drunk with a woman he met at a bar, Jack rear-ends a boat hitched to a parked car. The woman flees, telling him to enter her house through the back, but he enters the wrong house and is confronted by its occupant. Jack attempts to leave before the police arrive, but in the scuffle he falls and is knocked unconscious.

Awakening in the hospital, Jack is met by his sister, who demands that he get help for his alcoholism. He starts psychotherapy and begins opening up about his son's death. He meets with Angela and apologizes for his mistakes. The team dedicates their first playoff game to Jack. Meanwhile, at an outdoor court, he picks up a basketball and practices shooting.

== Cast ==
- Ben Affleck as Jack Cunningham
- Al Madrigal as Dan
- Michaela Watkins as Beth
- Janina Gavankar as Angela
- Glynn Turman as Doc
- Melvin Gregg as Marcus Parrish
- Brandon Wilson as Brandon Durrett
- Will Ropp as Kenny Dawes
- Fernando Luis Vega as Sam Garcia
- Charles Lott Jr. as Chubbs Hendricks
- Ben Irving as Bobby Freeze
- Da'Vinchi as Devon Childress
- John Aylward as Father Edward Devine
- T.K. Carter as Russ Durrett
- Rachael Carpani as Diane
- Todd Stashwick as Kurt
- Nancy Linehan Charles as Anne
- Dan Lauria as Gerry Norris
- Chris Bruno as Sal DeSanto
- Matthew Glave as Coach Lombardo
- Jeremy Ratchford as Matty
- Jayne Taini as Susan Norris
- Hayes MacArthur as Eric
- Marlene Forte as Gale

== Production ==
On June 11, 2018, it was announced that director Gavin O'Connor and actor Ben Affleck were going to re-team on a Warner Bros. drama film, titled The Has-Been, scripted by Brad Ingelsby about a former basketball star who has lost his wife and family foundation because of an addiction, and he attempts to regain his soul by becoming the coach of a high school basketball team at his alma mater. On September 26, 2018, it was reported that comedian Al Madrigal had joined the cast of the film, now known as Torrance, to play Dan, a well mannered high school mathematics teacher and the school's assistant coach who believes in Affleck's character after the head coach quits. Producers would be Jennifer Todd, Gordon Gray, Ravi Mehta, and O'Connor. In October 2018, Janina Gavankar joined the cast of the film. In November 2018, Brandon Wilson and Rachael Carpani joined the cast of the film. In July 2019, it was announced the title of the film was The Way Back. In August 2019, it was announced Rob Simonsen would score the film. Affleck spoke on how the film acted as a form of therapy for him following his own stints with alcoholism and rehab.

=== Filming ===
Principal photography began in October 2018 around the San Pedro and Long Beach neighborhood of Los Angeles. About one-third of the film was shot in the gym of Chaffey High School in Ontario, California.

== Release ==
The film was originally scheduled to be released on October 18, 2019. However, in March 2019, it was pushed back several months to March 6, 2020.

On March 19, Warner Bros. Pictures announced that the film would be available digitally in the United States and Canada through Premium VOD on March 24 due to movie theaters closures because of the COVID-19 pandemic restrictions. This was just two weeks after the film's theatrical debut and before the end of the usual 90-day theatrical run. Another film distributed by the studio, Birds of Prey and the Fantabulous Emancipation of One Harley Quinn, was also released earlier than expected for the same reason. The film was released on Blu-ray, and DVD on May 19, 2020.

== Reception ==
=== Box office ===
The Way Back grossed $13.6 million in the United States and Canada, and $1.9 million in other territories, for a worldwide total of $15.5 million, against a production budget of $21–25 million.

In the United States and Canada, the film was released alongside Onward and the wide expansion of Emma, and was projected to gross $7–10 million from 2,718 theaters in its opening weekend. It made $2.6 million on its first day. The film went on to debut to $8.5 million, finishing third at the box office. The film fell 70% in its second weekend to $2.4 million, finishing seventh, largely caused by the COVID-19 pandemic in the United States.

=== Critical response ===
On review aggregator Rotten Tomatoes, The Way Back holds an approval rating of 84% based on 215 reviews, with an average rating of 6.8/10. The website's critics consensus reads: "The Way Back's occasionally frustrating treatment of a formulaic story is often outweighed by Ben Affleck's outstanding work in the central role." On Metacritic, the film has a weighted average score of 66 out of 100, based on 40 critics, indicating "generally favorable reviews". Audiences polled by CinemaScore gave the film an average grade of "B+" on an A+ to F scale, and PostTrak reported it received an average 3.5 out of 5 stars from viewers they polled, with 54% saying they would definitely recommend it.

Todd McCarthy of The Hollywood Reporter wrote: "Affleck gives the impression of intimate familiarity with the anguish and self-disgust that dominate Jack's life; this character and project clearly meant something important to him, as the title bluntly suggests, and he gives it his all without overdoing the melodrama." Owen Gleiberman of Variety said that "Ben Affleck is compelling in a drama of addiction and redemption that plays off his own tabloid odyssey. But the tabloid version was better."

== See also ==
- List of basketball films
