= Strong Island (film) =

2017 film directed by Yance Ford

- Film poster
- Directed by: Yance Ford
- Produced by: Joslyn Barnes; Yance Ford
- Cinematography: Alan Jacobsen
- Edited by: Janus Billeskov Jansen
- Music by: Hildur Guðnadóttir
- Production companies: Yanceville Films; Louverture Films
- Distributed by: Netflix
- Release dates: January 23, 2017 (Sundance Film Festival); September 15, 2017
- Running time: 107 minutes

Strong Island is an American 2017 true-crime documentary film directed by Yance Ford.

== Synopsis ==
The film centers on the April 1992 murder of Ford's brother William, a 24-year-old African-American teacher in New York, who was shot and killed by Mark P. Reilly, a 19-year-old white chop shop mechanic. An all-white grand jury in Suffolk County declined to indict his killer, who claimed self-defense.

== Release and reception ==
The film premiered at the 2017 Sundance Film Festival. Worldwide rights were acquired by Netflix. It received a Gotham Independent Film Award for Best Documentary in 2017 and was nominated for the 2018 Academy Award for Best Documentary Feature. It was also nominated for an Emmy in Exceptional Merit in Documentary Filmmaking that year.

It received generally positive reviews from critics. Inkoo Kang of TheWrap said the film "is a demanding, wrenching watch; an important work." Bilge Ebiri of The Village Voice said the film is "truly special, especially as it moves towards its final act... the film is unflinching in its portrayal of their devastation after the loss of their eldest son."
