= Nickel Boys =

2024 film by RaMell Ross

- Theatrical release poster
- Directed by: RaMell Ross
- Screenplay by: RaMell Ross; Joslyn Barnes
- Based on: The Nickel Boys by Colson Whitehead
- Produced by: Dede Gardner; Jeremy Kleiner; David Levine; Joslyn Barnes
- Starring: Ethan Herisse; Brandon Wilson; Hamish Linklater; Fred Hechinger; Daveed Diggs; Jimmie Fails; Aunjanue Ellis-Taylor
- Cinematography: Jomo Fray
- Edited by: Nicholas Monsour
- Music by: Alex Somers; Scott Alario
- Production companies: Orion Pictures; Plan B Entertainment; Anonymous Content; Louverture Films
- Distributed by: Amazon MGM Studios
- Release dates: August 30, 2024 (Telluride); December 13, 2024 (United States)
- Running time: 140 minutes
- Country: United States
- Language: English
- Budget: $23.2 million
- Box office: $3 million

Nickel Boys is a 2024 American historical drama film based on the 2019 novel The Nickel Boys by Colson Whitehead. It was directed by RaMell Ross, who wrote the screenplay with Joslyn Barnes. Starring Ethan Herisse, Brandon Wilson, Hamish Linklater, Fred Hechinger, Daveed Diggs, Jimmie Fails, and Aunjanue Ellis-Taylor, the story follows two African-American boys, Elwood (Herisse) and Turner (Wilson), who are sent to an abusive reform school in 1960s Florida. The film is inspired by the Dozier School for Boys, a now-closed Florida reform school notorious for its abusive treatment of students.

The film was shot from a first-person point-of-view, with filming taking place in Louisiana in late 2022. It premiered at the 51st Telluride Film Festival on August 30, 2024, and had a limited theatrical release by Amazon MGM Studios on December 13, 2024. It was named one of the top 10 films of 2024 by the American Film Institute and received numerous accolades, including the award for Best Cinematography at the 40th Independent Spirit Awards, a Best Motion Picture – Drama nomination at the 82nd Golden Globe Awards and two nominations at the 97th Academy Awards for Best Picture and Best Adapted Screenplay. IndieWire named it the best film of the 2020s, as of 2025, and it has been cited by others as among the best of the 21st century.

== Plot ==
In 1962 Jim Crow-era Tallahassee, Florida, young African-American Elwood Curtis appears destined for great things in the classroom. His Black teacher encourages him to think for himself, rejecting Southern textbooks' slanted view of history. Elwood is raised by Hattie, his doting grandmother whose father died in a prison cell under suspicious circumstances. Elwood worries that White society will retaliate against him if he participates in the growing Civil Rights Movement, which he does.

One day, Elwood is accepted into a tuition-free accelerated study program at a HBCU. While hitchhiking to campus, he is picked up by a man driving a stolen car. The police catch the man and convict Elwood of being his accomplice. Because Elwood is underage, he is sent to the Nickel Academy, a reform school.

Nickel is internally segregated; White students enjoy comfortable accommodations and personal attention from staff, while Black students are housed in shabby facilities, and the school makes little attempt to educate them. Though Spencer, the White superintendent, tells the Black students that they can be released for good behavior, in practice they cannot leave until they turn eighteen, as the school makes money hiring them out as convict labor. It is implied that some students are sexually abused.

Elwood bonds with Turner, another quiet student. While Elwood is inspired by the non-violent and democratic ideals of the Civil Rights Movement, Turner is cynical, expects only mistreatment from society, and urges Elwood to keep his head down. Elwood is bullied and beaten by another student, but the administrators do not help him: instead, they savagely beat both students. Hattie tries to visit him at Nickel but, on arrival, is prohibited from seeing him. She also scrimps and saves to hire a lawyer to appeal his conviction, but the lawyer runs away with her money, devastating Elwood. Spencer bets on Nickel's annual Black-White boxing match, but quietly executes a Black student who either refused or forgot to take a dive that Spencer told him to take.

In flashforwards to 1988, the adult Elwood lives in New York City, where he runs his own moving business, and a former classmate, Chickie Pete, comes to him to remember old times and to ask him for work. Elwood does not appear to be in contact with Turner. In 2018, he is badly shaken after learning that many unmarked graves have been discovered at the old Nickel campus, and does research. Forensic evidence reveals that most of the dead students were Black.

Back in the 1960s, Elwood, fed up with his mistreatment, takes his carefully kept diary of Nickel abuses and convinces a reluctant Turner to deliver it to a government inspector as an exposé. However, nothing happens, and the administrators retaliate by torturing Elwood in the school sweatbox. Turner learns that the school plans to kill Elwood and comes to rescue him. They attempt an escape, running away together on bicycles. However, pursued by a car from Nickel, they are quickly caught. Turner escapes into the woods, but Elwood is shot and killed.

A montage shows that Turner safely reached Tallahassee, where he delivered the news of Elwood's death to Hattie. He then moved North and took on Elwood's name. He marries Millie, builds a stable life, and tries to honor Elwood's legacy by embracing some of his ideals. When the government begins investigating the school, Turner decides to testify about his experiences.

== Cast ==
- Ethan Herisse as Elwood, a boy who is sent to reform school after being unjustly convicted for helping steal a car
  - Ethan Cole Sharp as young Elwood
- Brandon Wilson as Turner, Elwood's friend at Nickel Academy
  - Daveed Diggs as adult Turner, a businessman in New York City
- Aunjanue Ellis-Taylor as Hattie, Elwood's grandmother
- Hamish Linklater as Spencer, Nickel Academy's corrupt superintendent
- Fred Hechinger as Harper, a school employee who helps oversee Nickel's convict labor program
- Jimmie Fails as Mr. Hill, Elwood's encouraging high school teacher
- Luke Tennie as Griff

== Production ==
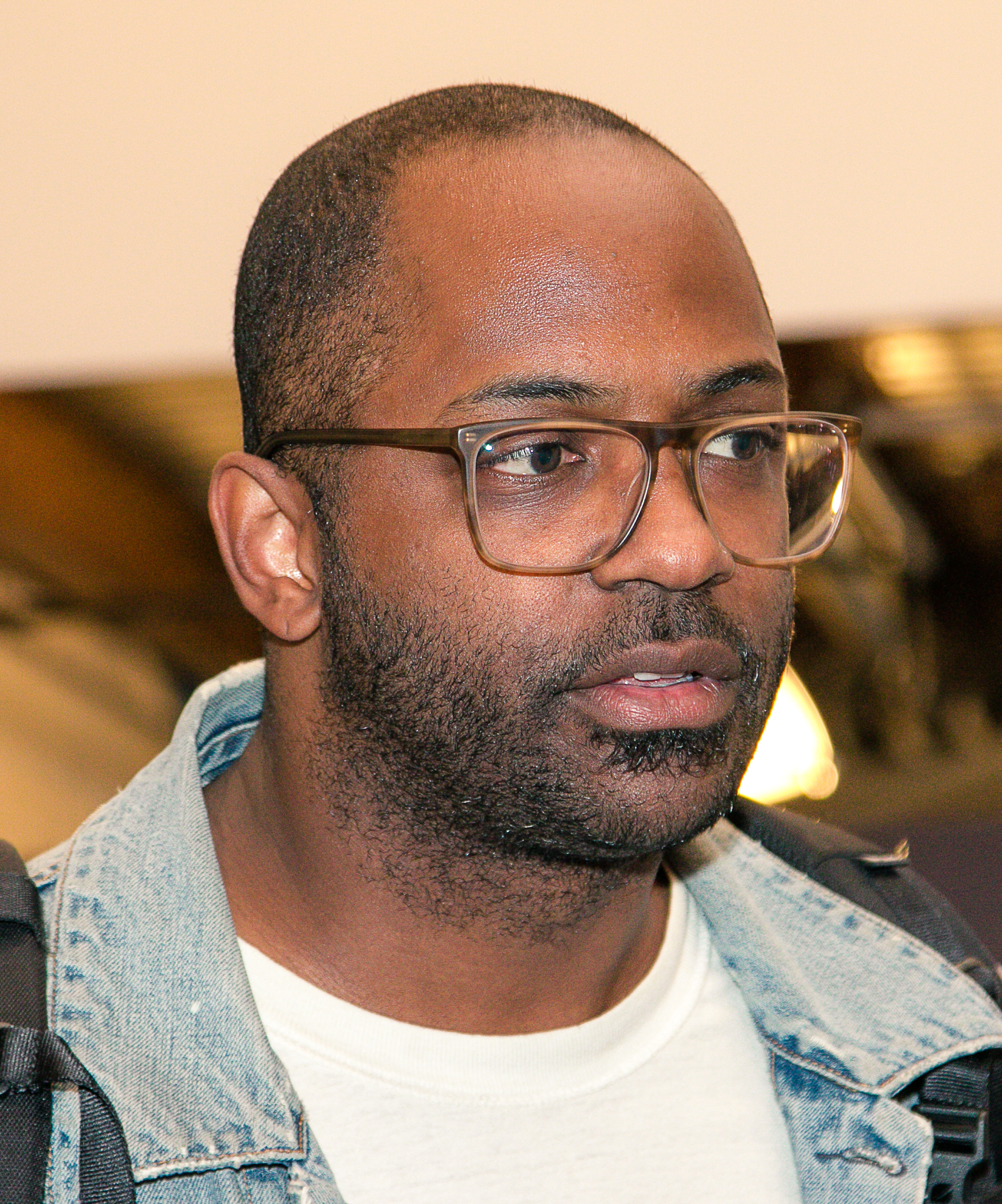
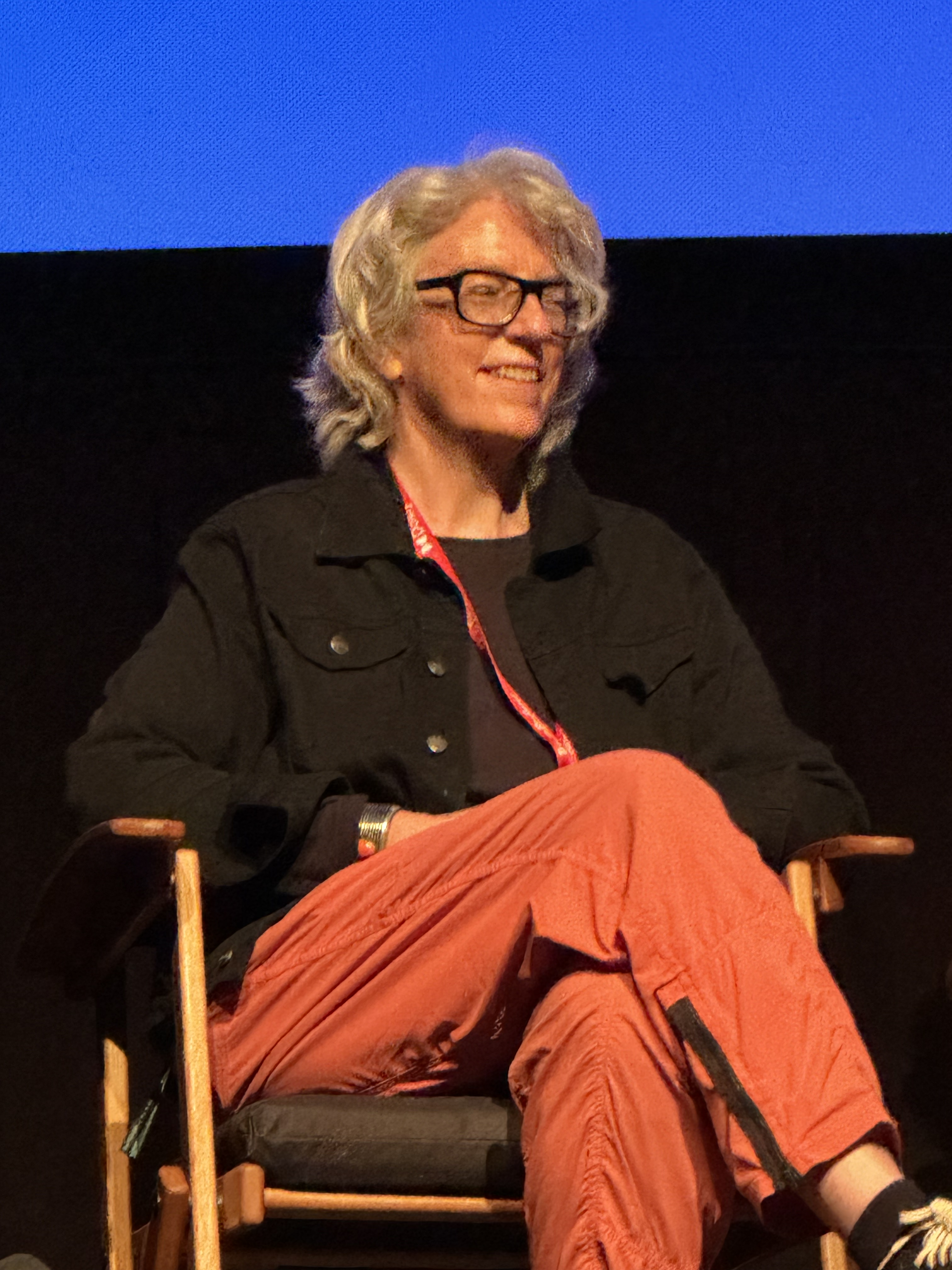
Director and co-writer RaMell Ross (left) and co-writer/co-producer Joslyn Barnes (right).

The adaptation of Colson Whitehead's 2019 novel, The Nickel Boys, into a feature film was reported in October 2022. RaMell Ross signed on to direct, making it his narrative feature directorial debut. Joslyn Barnes co-wrote and produced and Whitehead served as executive producer. Aunjanue Ellis-Taylor, Ethan Herisse, Fred Hechinger, Hamish Linklater, and Brandon Wilson were cast in the lead roles.

On a production budget of $23.2 million, principal photography took place in Louisiana from October to December 2022. Shooting locations were in LaPlace, New Orleans, Hammond and Ponchatoula. The office building of the Lafourche Parish District Attorney was used as a filming location in Thibodaux in early December.

In a unique filmmaking approach for viewers to see the plot unfold directly through the eyes of the two protagonists, the film was shot in from the first-person point-of-view with a 1.33:1 aspect ratio. This creative choice was compared heavily to a similar approach employed by Robert Montgomery for his 1947 film noir Lady in the Lake. Ross explained this process in an interview:

"The film is conceived as all one-ers. In one scene, we shot everything from Elwood's perspective, and then everything from Turner's—one from the first hour, and then the other for the second. Very rarely did we shoot both perspectives on a scene, though, because of the way it was written and scripted. We don’t always go back and forth. So it's shot like a traditional film, except the other character is not there. They're just asked to look at a specific point in the camera. Typically, the other actor is behind the camera, reading the lines and being the support to make the other person feel like they're actually engaged with something relatively real. Because they're all one-ers, though, the choreography is quite difficult."

In a scene where Hattie (Aunjanue Ellis-Taylor) hugs Turner, Hattie does not physically hug a scene partner. Rather, the camera operator, Sam Ellison, moves the camera in such a way that it suggests a hug. According to the director, Ellis-Taylor said the arrangement made her feel isolated, but also helped her play a character who feels lonely and craves intimacy.

== Release ==
Nickel Boys had its world premiere at the 51st Telluride Film Festival on August 30, 2024. It was the opening film at the 62nd New York Film Festival at Alice Tully Hall on September 27, 2024.

The film was originally set to have a limited theatrical release in New York City on October 25, 2024 and Los Angeles on November 1, before streaming on Prime Video on an unspecified date. However, the film's release was pushed further, with the film ultimately premiering in New York City on December 13 and in Los Angeles on December 20; Amazon MGM Studios additionally prepared 35mm film prints for the updated release. It was released by Curzon Film in the United Kingdom on January 3, 2025.

The film became available on to stream on Amazon Prime Video and MGM+ on February 24, 2025.

== Reception ==
=== Box office ===
As of March 12, 2025, the film has grossed $2.9 million in the United States and $356,592 in other territories for a worldwide total of $3.2 million.

The film began a limited release in the United States in December 2024, with a gradual rollout during awards season. In its first weekend, it earned $54,794 from two theaters in New York City (the Angelika Film Center and AMC Lincoln Square), for a per-screen average of $27,397. It opened in Los Angeles the following week, expanding to five theaters and earning $62,865 in its sophomore weekend and $34,145 in its third. It made $144,948 in its fourth weekend after adding 13 screens nationwide and grossed $119,911 playing in 26 theaters in its fifth. During the four-day MLK weekend, the film expanded to 240 theaters and made $386,191 to cross the $1 million mark stateside. Its three-day per-screen average of $1,246 was on the lower end of fellow awards-season films. After obtaining two Oscar nominations, it moved to 540 screens in its seventh weekend, earning $348,060 and pushing its nationwide cume past $1.5 million. Internationally, the film earned $356,592 from the United Kingdom, where it played for three weeks in January 2025.

=== Critical response ===
On the review aggregator website Rotten Tomatoes, 92% of 215 critics' reviews are positive, with an average rating of 8.4/10. The website's consensus reads: "Director RaMell Ross' stylistically radical approach to adapting Colson Whitehead's searing novel will be jarring for some, but Nickel Boys' sense of immersion achieves the jaw-dropping effect of walking in another's shoes." Metacritic, which uses a weighted average, assigned the film a score of 91 out of 100, based on 49 critics, indicating "universal acclaim".

Lovia Gyarkye of The Hollywood Reporter praised the film and cast performances. She highlighted the unique visual style, cinematography, and Ross's artistic portrayal of the novel's story. Pete Hammond writing for Deadline Hollywood criticized the "overlong" runtime and Ross's use of first person POV-style shooting of one character talking to another that is not seen on camera and only heard. He wrote, "It is a dangling conversation approach that goes quickly from being intriguing to being annoying, pointing to artifice rather than serving the story", and added, "I hope it doesn't prevent some audiences from getting the larger point that we should be talking about". Maureen Lee Lenker of Entertainment Weekly felt a disconnection with Elwood and Turner by the POV approach, explaining, "Both Wilson and Herisse give subtle, affecting performances but the first-person approach means they are often not on camera. Their performances are largely experiential, which makes it difficult to connect with their work on an emotional level".

Carla Renata writing for TheWrap applauded Alex Somers and Scott Alario's music score, casting and performances. She expressed: "This may sound like another Black trauma porn motion picture sanctioned by Hollywood to exploit Black history for financial gain. Thankfully, through the lens of Ross, this narrative doesn't fall into that trap we have seen for decades. Ross [...] brings his unique cinematic sensibility, allowing audiences to experience this type of story from a sensory perspective". IndieWire's David Ehrlich gave the film an "A" grade, emphasizing the film's visual style and storytelling technique. David Canfield of Vanity Fair wrote the film's "avant-garde approach is cannily balanced by its moral urgency and aesthetic rigor. Like last year's The Zone of Interest, it all but reinvents the language for movies about a particular, dark historical chapter, and seems primed to spark conversations about both its content and its form".

Filmmaker Barry Jenkins named it one of his favorite films of 2024, saying "This is medium-defining work — aesthetically, spiritually — a rich and overwhelming cinema where the camera is always curious and what it finds is always arresting. In a time where there are more ways to make a film than ever (and yet less variation in the look, the feel, the shape of those films than in any other point in the medium’s history) RaMell has given us a new way of seeing. It is a thing to make one both humbled… and filled with gratitude."

In May 2025, ScreenCrush ranked the film at number 11 on its list of "The 20 Best Movies of the Last 20 Years," with Matt Singer calling it "something original, something bold, something with a point of view — or, in this case, two points of view ... If used improperly, that technique could become a distracting gimmick. In Ross’ hands, you truly feel like you’ve seen the world in a new way. And maybe seen the future of movies too." In June 2025, filmmaker Julie Dash named it one of her favorite films of the 21st century.

In July 2025, it was one of the films voted for the "Readers' Choice" edition of The New York Times' list of "The 100 Best Movies of the 21st Century," finishing at number 210. That same month, it ranked number 48 on Rolling Stone's list of "The 100 Best Movies of the 21st Century." Sight & Sound ranked the film tenth in their list of the "Best 50 Movies of 2024".

== Accolades ==
Award	Date of ceremony	Category	Recipient(s)	Result	Ref.
AARP Movies for Grownups Awards	February 8, 2025	Best Supporting Actress	Aunjanue Ellis-Taylor	Nominated	
Academy Awards	March 2, 2025	Best Picture	Dede Gardner, Jeremy Kleiner and Joslyn Barnes	Nominated	
Academy Awards	March 2, 2025	Best Adapted Screenplay	RaMell Ross and Joslyn Barnes	Nominated	
Alliance of Women Film Journalists	January 7, 2025	Best Film	Nickel Boys	Nominated	
Alliance of Women Film Journalists	January 7, 2025	Best Actress in a Supporting Role	Aunjanue Ellis-Taylor	Nominated	
Alliance of Women Film Journalists	January 7, 2025	Best Adapted Screenplay	RaMell Ross, Joslyn Barnes and Colson Whitehead	Nominated	
Alliance of Women Film Journalists	January 7, 2025	Best Cinematography	Jomo Fray	Nominated	
African-American Film Critics Association	February 2, 2025	Gen Next Award	Brandon Wilson and Ethan Herisse	Honored	
African-American Film Critics Association	February 2, 2025	Karen & Stanley Kramer Social Justice Award	Nickel Boys	Honored	
African-American Film Critics Association	February 19, 2025	Spotlight Award	RaMell Ross	Honored	
Artios Awards	February 12, 2025	Outstanding Achievement in Casting – Feature Studio or Independent Film (Drama)	Victoria Thomas; Jennifer Yoo, Meagan Lewis	Nominated	
Astra Film Awards	December 8, 2024	Best Adapted Screenplay	RaMell Ross and Joslyn Barnes	Nominated	
Astra Film Awards	December 8, 2024	Best Supporting Actress	Aunjanue Ellis-Taylor	Nominated	
Astra Creative Arts Awards	December 8, 2024	Best Cinematography	Jomo Fray	Nominated	
Austin Film Critics Association	January 6, 2025	Best Film	Nickel Boys	Nominated	
Austin Film Critics Association	January 6, 2025	Best Adapted Screenplay	RaMell Ross and Joslyn Barnes	Nominated	
Austin Film Critics Association	January 6, 2025	Best Cinematography	Jomo Fray	Nominated	
Black Reel Awards	February 17, 2025	Outstanding Film	Nickel Boys	Won	
Black Reel Awards	February 17, 2025	Outstanding Director	RaMell Ross	Won	
Black Reel Awards	February 17, 2025	Outstanding Supporting Performance	Aunjanue Ellis-Taylor	Nominated	
Black Reel Awards	February 17, 2025	Outstanding Supporting Performance	Brandon Wilson	Nominated	
Black Reel Awards	February 17, 2025	Outstanding Breakthrough Performance	Brandon Wilson	Nominated	
Black Reel Awards	February 17, 2025	Outstanding Breakthrough Performance	Ethan Herisse	Nominated	
Black Reel Awards	February 17, 2025	Outstanding Ensemble	Victoria Thomas	Nominated	
Black Reel Awards	February 17, 2025	Outstanding Screenplay	RaMell Ross and Joslyn Barnes	Won	
Black Reel Awards	February 17, 2025	Outstanding Breakthrough Screenwriter	RaMell Ross	Won	
Black Reel Awards	February 17, 2025	Outstanding Emerging Director	RaMell Ross	Won	
Black Reel Awards	February 17, 2025	Outstanding Cinematography	Jomo Fray	Won	
Black Reel Awards	February 17, 2025	Outstanding Production Design	Nora Mendis, Elizabeth Herberg and Monique Champagne	Nominated	
Black Reel Awards	February 17, 2025	Outstanding Hairstyling & Makeup	Iganica Soto-Aguilar and Shandrea Williams	Nominated	
Boston Society of Film Critics	December 8, 2024	Best Adapted Screenplay	RaMell Ross and Joslyn Barnes	Won	
British Academy Film Awards	February 16, 2025	Best Adapted Screenplay	RaMell Ross & Joslyn Barnes	Nominated	
Camerimage	November 23, 2024	Director's Debut Competitions	Jomo Fray	Nominated	
Chicago Film Critics Association	December 12, 2024	Best Film	Nickel Boys	Nominated	
Chicago Film Critics Association	December 12, 2024	Best Director	RaMell Ross	Won	
Chicago Film Critics Association	December 12, 2024	Best Adapted Screenplay	RaMell Ross and Joslyn Barnes	Won	
Chicago Film Critics Association	December 12, 2024	Best Cinematography	Jomo Fray	Won	
Chicago Film Critics Association	December 12, 2024	Best Editing	Nicolas Monsour	Nominated	
Chicago Film Critics Association	December 12, 2024	Milos Stehlik Award for Breakthrough Filmmaker	RaMell Ross	Won	
Chicago International Film Festival	October 23, 2024	Vanguard Award	RaMell Ross	Honored	
Critics' Choice Movie Awards	February 7, 2025	Best Picture	Nickel Boys	Nominated	
Critics' Choice Movie Awards	February 7, 2025	Best Director	RaMell Ross	Nominated	
Critics' Choice Movie Awards	February 7, 2025	Best Supporting Actress	Aunjanue Ellis-Taylor	Nominated	
Critics' Choice Movie Awards	February 7, 2025	Best Adapted Screenplay	RaMell Ross and Joslyn Barnes	Nominated	
Critics' Choice Movie Awards	February 7, 2025	Best Cinematography	Jomo Fray	Nominated	
Dallas–Fort Worth Film Critics Association	December 18, 2024	Best Picture	Nickel Boys	8th place	
Dallas–Fort Worth Film Critics Association	December 18, 2024	Best Director	RaMell Ross	5th place	
Denver International Film Festival	November 10, 2024	Excellence in Directing Award	RaMell Ross	Honored	
Florida Film Critics Circle	December 20, 2024	Best Director	RaMell Ross	Nominated	
Florida Film Critics Circle	December 20, 2024	Best Supporting Actress	Aunjanue Ellis-Taylor	Nominated	
Florida Film Critics Circle	December 20, 2024	Best Adapted Screenplay	RaMell Ross and Joslyn Barnes	Nominated	
Florida Film Critics Circle	December 20, 2024	Best Cinematography	Jomo Fray	Nominated	
Georgia Film Critics Association	January 7, 2025	Best Picture	Nickel Boys	Nominated	
Georgia Film Critics Association	January 7, 2025	Best Director	RaMell Ross	Nominated	
Georgia Film Critics Association	January 7, 2025	Best Supporting Actress	Aunjanue Ellis-Taylor	Nominated	
Georgia Film Critics Association	January 7, 2025	Best Adapted Screenplay	RaMell Ross and Joslyn Barnes	Won	
Georgia Film Critics Association	January 7, 2025	Best Cinematography	Jomo Fray	Nominated	
Golden Globe Awards	January 5, 2025	Best Motion Picture – Drama	Nickel Boys	Nominated	
Gotham Awards	December 2, 2024	Best Feature	RaMell Ross, Joslyn Barnes, Dede Gardner, Jeremy Kleiner and David Levine	Nominated	
Gotham Awards	December 2, 2024	Best Director	RaMell Ross	Won	
Gotham Awards	December 2, 2024	Breakthrough Performer	Brandon Wilson	Won	
Independent Spirit Awards	February 22, 2025	Best Feature	Joslyn Barnes, Dede Gardner, Jeremy Kleiner, and David Levine	Nominated	
Independent Spirit Awards	February 22, 2025	Best Cinematography	Jomo Fray	Won	
Los Angeles Film Critics Association	December 8, 2024	Cinematography	Jomo Fray	Won	
Los Angeles Film Critics Association	December 8, 2024	Editing	Nicholas Monsour	Won (Note: Tied with Hansjörg Weißbrich for September 5)	
Middleburg Film Festival	October 20, 2024	Special Achievement in Filmmaking Award	RaMell Ross	Honored	
NAACP Image Awards	February 22, 2025	Outstanding Directing in a Motion Picture	RaMell Ross	Won	
NAACP Image Awards	February 22, 2025	Outstanding Breakthrough Creative (Motion Picture)	RaMell Ross	Nominated	
NAACP Image Awards	February 22, 2025	Outstanding Supporting Actress in a Motion Picture	Aunjanue Ellis-Taylor	Nominated	
NAACP Image Awards	February 22, 2025	Outstanding Breakthrough Performance in a Motion Picture	Brandon Wilson	Nominated	
NAACP Image Awards	February 22, 2025	Outstanding Writing in a Motion Picture	RaMell Ross and Joslyn Barnes	Won	
NAACP Image Awards	February 22, 2025	Outstanding Cinematography in a Feature Film	Jomo Fray	Won	
National Society of Film Critics	January 4, 2025	Best Picture	Nickel Boys	Won	
National Society of Film Critics	January 4, 2025	Best Director	RaMell Ross	Runner-up	
National Society of Film Critics	January 4, 2025	Best Cinematography	Jomo Fray	Won	
New York Film Critics Circle Awards	December 3, 2024	Best Director	RaMell Ross	Won	
New York Film Critics Circle Awards	December 3, 2024	Best Cinematography	Jomo Fray	Won	
New York Film Critics Online	December 16, 2024	Best Director	RaMell Ross	Nominated	
New York Film Critics Online	December 16, 2024	Best Cinematography	Jomo Fray	Nominated	
San Francisco Bay Area Film Critics Circle	December 15, 2024	Best Film	Nickel Boys	Nominated	
San Francisco Bay Area Film Critics Circle	December 15, 2024	Best Director	RaMell Ross	Nominated	
San Francisco Bay Area Film Critics Circle	December 15, 2024	Best Adapted Screenplay	RaMell Ross & Joslyn Barnes	Nominated	
San Francisco Bay Area Film Critics Circle	December 15, 2024	Best Cinematography	Jomo Fray	Nominated	
Satellite Awards	January 26, 2025	Best Motion Picture – Drama	Nickel Boys	Nominated	
Satellite Awards	January 26, 2025	Best Director	RaMell Ross	Nominated	
Satellite Awards	January 26, 2025	Best Adapted Screenplay	RaMell Ross and Joslyn Barnes	Won	
Satellite Awards	January 26, 2025	Best Cinematography	Jomo Fray	Nominated	
Seattle Film Critics Society	December 16, 2024	Best Cinematography	Jomo Fray	Won	
St. Louis Film Critics Association	December 15, 2024	Best Film	Nickel Boys	Nominated	
St. Louis Film Critics Association	December 15, 2024	Best Director	RaMell Ross	Nominated	
St. Louis Film Critics Association	December 15, 2024	Best Supporting Actress	Aunjanue Ellis-Taylor	Won	
St. Louis Film Critics Association	December 15, 2024	Best Adapted Screenplay	RaMell Ross and Joslyn Barnes	Nominated	
St. Louis Film Critics Association	December 15, 2024	Best Cinematography	Jomo Fray	Nominated	
St. Louis Film Critics Association	December 15, 2024	Best Editing	Nicholas Monsour	Won	
St. Louis Film Critics Association	December 15, 2024	Best First Feature	RaMell Ross	Won	
Stockholm International Film Festival	November 15, 2024	Bronze Horse	Nickel Boys	Won	
Toronto Film Critics Association	December 15, 2024	Best Film	Nickel Boys	Won	
Toronto Film Critics Association	December 15, 2024	Best Director	RaMell Ross	Won	
Toronto Film Critics Association	December 15, 2024	Best Adapted Screenplay	RaMell Ross and Joslyn Barnes	Won	
Washington D.C. Area Film Critics Association	December 8, 2024	Best Supporting Actress	Aunjanue Ellis-Taylor	Nominated	
Washington D.C. Area Film Critics Association	December 8, 2024	Best Adapted Screenplay	RaMell Ross and Joslyn Barnes	Nominated	
Washington D.C. Area Film Critics Association	December 8, 2024	Best Cinematography	Jomo Fray	Nominated	
Winter IndieWire Honors	December 5, 2024	Auteur Award	RaMell Ross	Won	
