= Exhibiting Forgiveness =

2024 film by Titus Kaphar

- Theatrical release poster
- Directed by: Titus Kaphar
- Written by: Titus Kaphar
- Produced by: Stephanie Allain; Derek Cianfrance; Jamie Patricof; Sean Cotton; Titus Kaphar
- Starring: André Holland; Andra Day; John Earl Jelks; Aunjanue Ellis-Taylor
- Cinematography: Lachlan Milne
- Edited by: Ron Patane
- Music by: Jherek Bischoff
- Production companies: Homegrown Pictures; Hunting Lane; Shade Pictures
- Distributed by: Roadside Attractions
- Release dates: January 20, 2024 (Sundance); October 18, 2024 (United States)
- Running time: 117 minutes
- Country: United States
- Language: English
- Box office: $506,520

Exhibiting Forgiveness is a 2024 American independent drama film written and directed by Titus Kaphar. The film stars André Holland, Andra Day, John Earl Jelks and Aunjanue Ellis-Taylor.

The film premiered at the Sundance Film Festival on January 20, 2024 and was released in the United States on October 18, 2024.

== Plot ==
Tarrell, a painter, has a loving relationship with his wife Aisha, young son Jermaine, and mother Joyce. When Tarrell's father La'Ron re-enters his life, Tarrell is upset and bitter about their strained relationship. Flashbacks reveal La'Ron's stern and abusive behavior towards Tarrell and Joyce. La'Ron has a newfound identity as a Christian, and Joyce (who's already a devout Christian) urges Tarrell to forgive his father, citing a portion from the New Testament. Shortly after, Joyce dies. Later, La'Ron shows up at a gallery showing of Tarrell's art. Tarrell and La'Ron argue, and La'Ron urges forgiveness. Tarrell yields and forgives his father, but insists that they will have no future together. Later, Tarrell tells his son that he loves him.

== Cast ==
- André Holland as Tarrell
- Andra Day as Aisha
- Aunjanue Ellis-Taylor as Joyce
- John Earl Jelks as La'Ron
- Ian Foreman as Young Tarrell
- Daniel Michael Barriere as Jermaine
- Matthew Elam as Quentin
- Jaime Ray Newman as Janine

== Release ==
The film premiered in the U.S. Dramatic Competition at the Sundance Film Festival on January 20, 2024. In April 2024, Roadside Attractions acquired distribution rights to the film, planning to release it theatrically sometime in fall the same year. The film began a limited theatrical run in the United States on October 18, 2024.

== Reception ==
On the review aggregator website Rotten Tomatoes, 95% of 74 critics' reviews are positive, with an average rating of 8.2/10. The website's consensus reads: "André Holland lays himself bare in a characteristically wonderful performance in this vivid portrait of a family coming to terms with the past." Metacritic, which uses a weighted average, assigned the film a score of 82 out of 100, based on 17 critics, indicating "universal acclaim".

The Guardian critic Benjamin Lee described the film as an "emotionally wrenching drama set to resonate with those who have also had to confront the complicated equation of radical forgiveness". Owen Gleiberman of Variety wrote, "Exhibiting Forgiveness sends you out on a note of hope, but it’s not exactly a feel-good movie. It’s a feel-the-reality movie, a drama willing to scald. That’s its quiet power".

== Accolades ==
Award	Date of ceremony	Category	Recipient(s)	Result	Ref.
African-American Film Critics Association Awards	19 February 2025	Top 10 Films of the Year	Exhibiting Forgiveness	9th Place	
African-American Film Critics Association Awards	19 February 2025	Best Original Song	"Bricks" Andra Day and Jherek Bischoff	Won	
Black Reel Awards	10 February 2025	Outstanding Film	Exhibiting Forgiveness	Nominated	
Black Reel Awards	10 February 2025	Outstanding Director	Titus Kaphar	Nominated	
Black Reel Awards	10 February 2025	Outstanding Screenplay	Titus Kaphar	Nominated	
Black Reel Awards	10 February 2025	Outstanding First Screenplay	Titus Kaphar	Nominated	
Black Reel Awards	10 February 2025	Outstanding Emerging Director	Titus Kaphar	Nominated	
Black Reel Awards	10 February 2025	Outstanding Lead Performance	André Holland	Nominated	
Black Reel Awards	10 February 2025	Outstanding Supporting Performance	Aunjanue Ellis-Taylor	Nominated	
Black Reel Awards	10 February 2025	Outstanding Ensemble	Kim Coleman	Nominated	
Black Reel Awards	10 February 2025	Outstanding Original Song	"Bricks" Andra Day and Jherek Bischoff	Nominated	
NAACP Image Awards	22 February 2025	Outstanding Independent Motion Picture	Exhibiting Forgiveness	Nominated	
NAACP Image Awards	22 February 2025	Outstanding Breakthrough Creative (Motion Picture)	Titus Kaphar	Nominated	
NAACP Image Awards	22 February 2025	Outstanding Writing in a Motion Picture	Titus Kaphar	Nominated	
NAACP Image Awards	22 February 2025	Outstanding Cinematography in a Feature Film	Lachlan Milne	Nominated	
NAACP Image Awards	22 February 2025	Outstanding Supporting Actress in a Motion Picture	Aunjanue Ellis-Taylor	Nominated	
NAACP Image Awards	22 February 2025	Outstanding Actor in a Motion Picture	André Holland	Nominated	
Sundance Film Festival	18 January 2024	Grand Jury Prize - U.S. Dramatic Competition	Exhibiting Forgiveness	Nominated	
Washington D.C. Area Film Critics Association	8 December 2024	Best Youth Performance	Ian Foreman	Nominated	
