= Brandon Wilson (actor) =

American actor

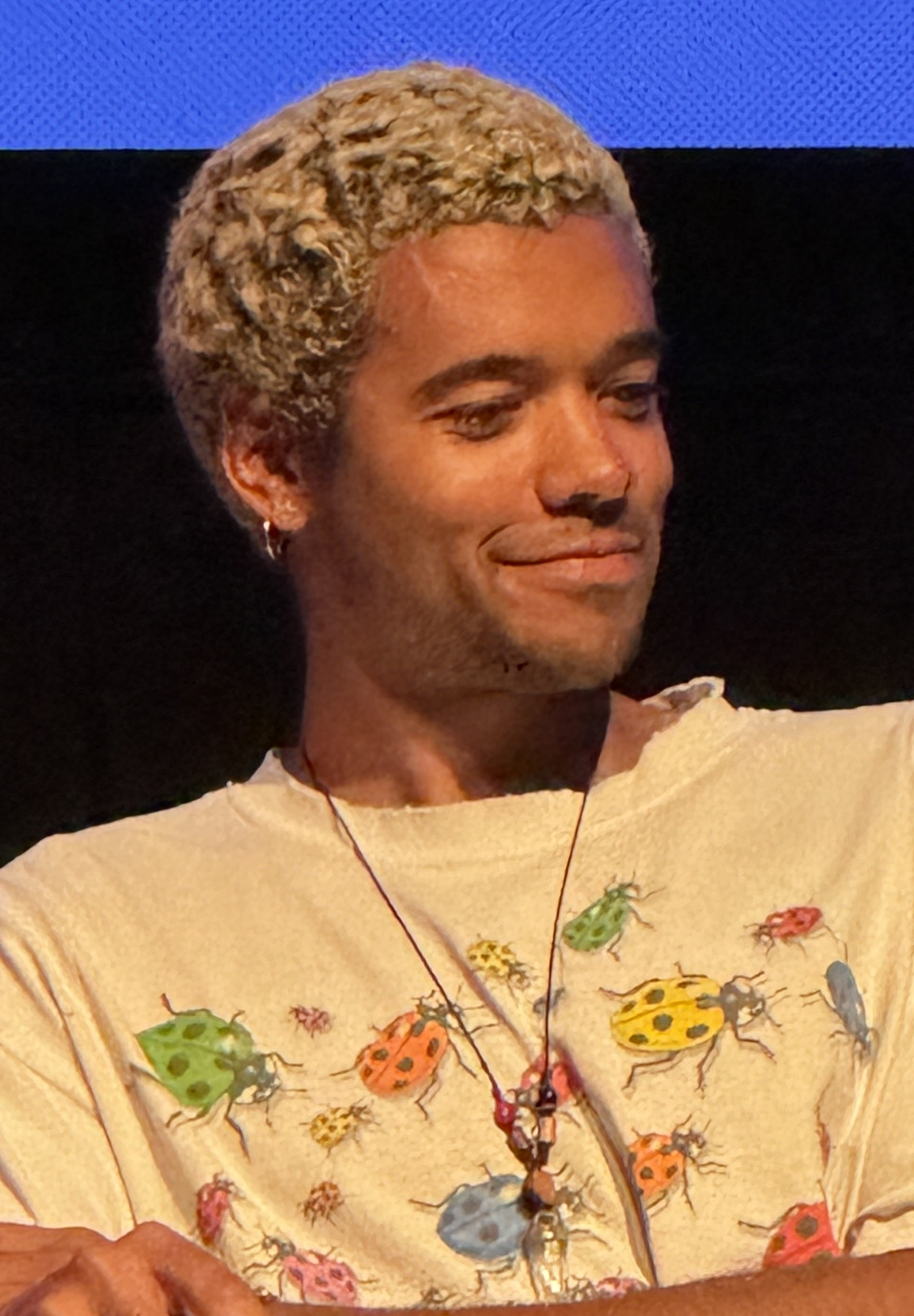
- Wilson at the 2024 Telluride Film Festival
- Occupation: Actor
- Years active: 2020—present

Brandon Wilson is an American actor. He had a supporting role in The Way Back (2020) and a leading role in Nickel Boys (2024). His breakout performance in the latter earned him a Gotham Award.

== Career ==
Wilson played the character of Brandon Durrett in The Way Back directed by Gavin O'Connor and starring Ben Affleck. In 2022, Wilson acted in Mark Polish's horror film Murmur. He has also appeared in the television series, Ray Donovan.

In 2024, Wilson starred in Nickel Boys, a film adaptation of Colson Whitehead's novel by the same name. The film premiered at Telluride Film Festival and showed at the New York Film Festival. Ethan Herisse and he played two boys who are sent to an abusive reform school. Lovia Gyarkye of The Hollywood Reporter wrote that both "Herisse and Wilson offer striking performances that deepen understanding of this bond and clarify the trauma of this experience". For his performance, Wilson won the Gotham Independent Film Award for Breakthrough Performer.

== Filmography ==
=== Films ===
Year	Title	Role	Notes
2020	The Way Back	Brandon Durrett	
2022	Murmur	Zach	
2024	Nickel Boys	Turner	Gotham Independent Film Award for Breakthrough Performer
2026	Disclosure Day	Nathan Twining	

=== Television ===
Year	Title	Role	Notes
2017	Ray Donovan	Ian	Season 5, episode 4
