= Ethan Herisse =

Haitian-American Actor

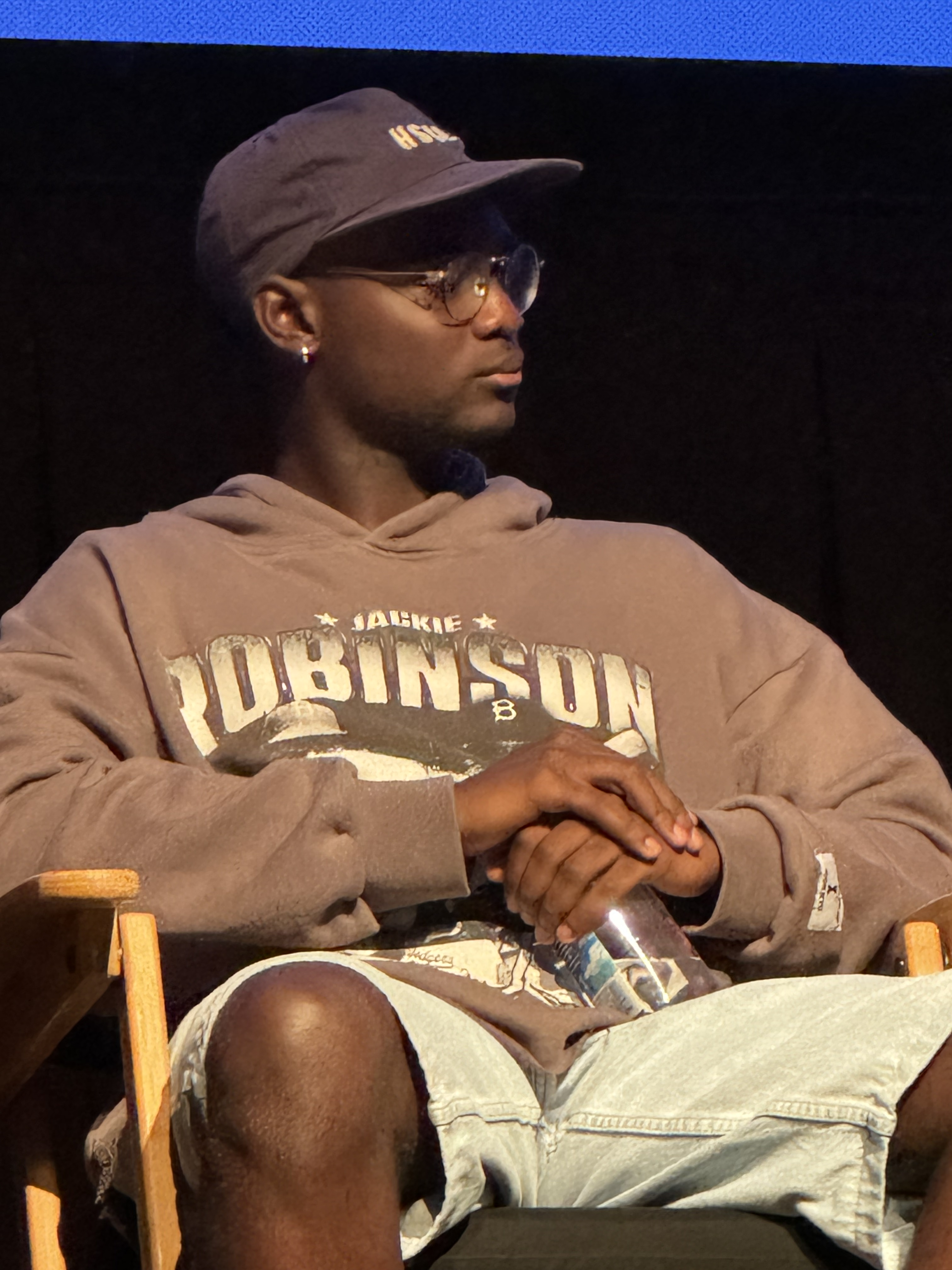
- Ethan Herisse at the 2024 Telluride Film Festival
- Born: Ethan Henry Herisse; September 24, 2000 (age 26); Miami, Florida, US
- Education: University of California, Irvine
- Occupation: Actor

Ethan Herisse (born September 24, 2000) is a Haitian-American actor. He is best known for his role as young Yusef Salaam on the Netflix original series When They See Us (2019) and as Elwood in the Academy Award nominated film Nickel Boys (2024).

== Early life and education ==
Herisse was born in Miami, Florida to Haitian parents and spent his early childhood in Randolph, Massachusetts.

Herisse had aspirations to be a basketball player until he accompanied his younger sister to an acting class and soon began performing. After his parents asked him if he wanted to pursue acting seriously at age 11, the family moved to Los Angeles, California.

In 2024, Herisse received a Bachelor of Science in Chemistry from University of California, Irvine.

== Career ==
Herisse spent his middle and high school years in Burbank going to auditions between classes, acting in guest roles on shows like The Mindy Project, About a Boy, and Key & Peele.

At 17, Herisse was cast in his breakthrough role as Yusef Salaam, a real-life member of the Central Park Five, in Ava DuVernay’s Netflix miniseries, When They See Us. He was nominated for Outstanding Actor in a Television Movie, Limited Series or Dramatic Special at the 51st NAACP Image Awards in 2020.

Herisse landed the lead role of Elwood in RaMell Ross' Nickel Boys (2024), an adaptation of Colson Whitehead's novel.

== Filmography ==
=== Films ===
Year	Title	Role	Notes
2019	Miss Virginia	Jerome	
2024	The American Society of Magical Negroes	Dashawn	
2024	Nickel Boys	Elwood	

=== Television ===
Year	Title	Role	Notes
2012–2013	Go On	Nate	2 episodes
2013	The Mindy Project	Jean Jean	Episode: My Cool Christian Boyfriend
2014	About a Boy	Jordan	Episode: About a Vasectomy
2014	Key & Peele	Student #1	Episode: Sex Addict Wendell
2019	When They See Us	Yusef Salaam (Teen)	Lead role, 4 episodes
2022	Chicago Med	Emmanuel Sanon	Episode: No Good Deed Goes Unpunished... in Chicago
