= RaMell Ross =

American artist and filmmaker (born 1982)

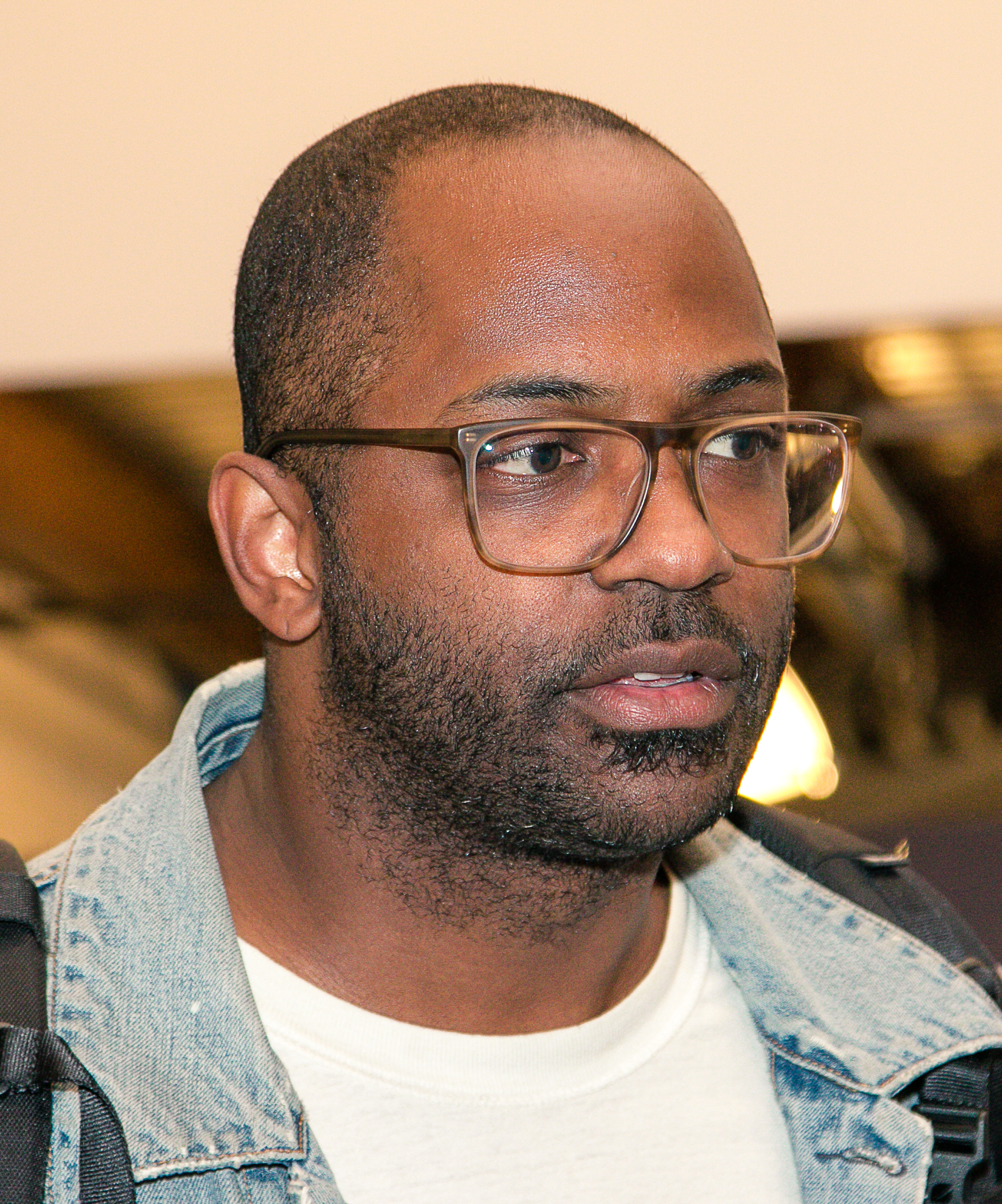
- Ross at the 2018 Montclair Film Festival
- Born: 1982 (age 43–44); Frankfurt, Germany
- Education: Georgetown University (BA); Rhode Island School of Design (MFA)
- Occupations: Film director, photographer, professor
- Website: https://www.ramellross.com

RaMell Ross is an American filmmaker. His directorial debut, Hale County This Morning, This Evening (2018), earned him a Peabody Award, and nominations for the Academy Award for Best Documentary Feature Film and the Primetime Emmy Award for Exceptional Merit in Documentary Filmmaking. Ross directed and co-wrote the screenplay for the 2024 film adaptation of the novel The Nickel Boys (2019), for which he won the New York Film Critics Circle Award for Best Director, and received a nomination for the Academy Award for Best Adapted Screenplay (shared with Joslyn Barnes).

== Early life and education ==
Ross was born in Frankfurt, Germany, and raised in Fairfax, Virginia, where he attended Lake Braddock Secondary School.

In 2005, Ross graduated from Georgetown University, where he majored in English and sociology and played on the Georgetown Hoyas men's basketball team. He later earned a Master of Fine Arts degree in photography from the Rhode Island School of Design.

== Career ==
In 2006, Ross moved to Ireland to work for Playing For Peace's Northern Ireland initiative. While in Ireland he played professional basketball for MDS Star of the Sea Belfast, a team in Ireland's SuperLeague North Division. It was here he would first get an interest in directing and video editing as he worked as an apprentice of the video editor for North Star Basketball.

In 2009, Ross moved to Greensboro, Alabama for a position as a basketball coach and photography teacher. These experiences inspired multiple collections of photographs and art installments inspired by black life in the American South.

Filmmaker Magazine named Ross among "25 New Faces of Independent Film" in 2015. That year, he was a Sundance Institute New Frontier Artist in Residence at the MIT Media Lab. He joined faculty of the Brown Arts Initiative at Brown University in 2016, where he currently serves as an assistant professor of visual art. Soon after, he was awarded a two-year Mellon Gateway Fellowship.

Ross' directorial debut, Hale County This Morning, This Evening, an experimental documentary about black life in Hale County, Alabama, premiered at the 2018 Sundance Film Festival. He was awarded the Special Jury Award for Creative Vision at the festival. The film went on to win a Peabody Award and in 2019 was nominated for the Academy Award for Best Documentary Feature Film and the Primetime Emmy Award for Exceptional Merit in Documentary Filmmaking.

Easter Snap, Ross' documentary short depicting five men preparing a hog to be butchered in a ritualistic fashion, debuted at the 2019 Sundance Film Festival.

The Ogden Museum of Southern Art presented a retrospective of Ross' artwork, titled Spell, Time, Practice, American, Body: The Work of RaMell Ross from October 2021 to March 2022. A book of Ross' work titled Spell, Time, Practice, American, Body was released in 2023.

Nickel Boys, Ross' film adaptation of the Colson Whitehead novel The Nickel Boys, debuted at the Telluride Film Festival on August 30, 2024. The film opened the 2024 New York Film Festival.

== Filmography ==
Year	Title	Notes	Ref.
2018	Hale County This Morning, This Evening	Documentary film	
2019	Easter Snap	Documentary short	
2024	Nickel Boys	Narrative feature film	

== Awards and nominations ==
Year	Award	Category	Nominated work	Result	Ref.
2018	Sundance Film Festival	Special Jury Award for Creative Vision	Hale County This Morning, This Evening	Won	
2018	Gotham Awards	Best Documentary	Hale County This Morning, This Evening	Won (Note: Shared with Joslyn Barnes and Su Kim)	
2019	Academy Awards	Best Documentary Feature Film	Hale County This Morning, This Evening	Nominated	
2019	Primetime Emmy Awards	Exceptional Merit in Documentary Filmmaking	Hale County This Morning, This Evening	Nominated (Note: Shared with Joslyn Barnes, Su Kim, and Lois Vossen)	
2019	Peabody Awards	Documentary Category	Hale County This Morning, This Evening	Won (Note: Recognized as one of ten honorees)	
2019	Chicago International Film Festival	Best Documentary Short	Easter Snap	Won	
2024	Gotham Awards	Best Director	Nickel Boys	Won	
2024	New York Film Critics Circle	Best Director	Nickel Boys	Won	
2024	Astras Film Awards	Best Adapted Screenplay	Nickel Boys	Nominated (Note: Shared with Joslyn Barnes)	
2024	Boston Society of Film Critics	Best Adapted Screenplay	Nickel Boys	Won	
2024	Chicago Film Critics Association	Best Director	Nickel Boys	Won	
2024	Chicago Film Critics Association	Best Adapted Screenplay	Nickel Boys	Won	
2024	Chicago Film Critics Association	Breakthrough Filmmaker	Nickel Boys	Won	
2024	Toronto Film Critics Association	Best Director	Nickel Boys	Won	
2024	Toronto Film Critics Association	Best Screenplay	Nickel Boys	Won	
2024	Stockholm Film Festival	Best Film	Nickel Boys	Won	
2025	National Society of Film Critics	Best Director	Nickel Boys	Runner-up	
2025	Georgia Film Critics Association	Best Director	Nickel Boys	Nominated	
2025	Georgia Film Critics Association	Best Adapted Screenplay	Nickel Boys	Won	
2025	Georgia Film Critics Association	Breakthrough Award	Nickel Boys	Won	
2025	Satellite Awards	Best Director	Nickel Boys	Nominated	
2025	Satellite Awards	Best Adapted Screenplay	Nickel Boys	Won	
2025	London Film Critics' Circle	Director of the Year	Nickel Boys	Won	
2025	Critics' Choice Awards	Best Director	Nickel Boys	Nominated	
2025	Critics' Choice Awards	Best Adapted Screenplay	Nickel Boys	Nominated	
2025	Directors Guild of America Awards	First-Time Theatrical Feature Film	Nickel Boys	Won	
2025	Writers Guild of America Awards	Best Adapted Screenplay	Nickel Boys	Won	
2025	Writers Guild of America Awards	Paul Selvin Award	Nickel Boys	Honored	
2025	British Academy Film Awards	Best Adapted Screenplay	Nickel Boys	Nominated	
2025	Black Reel Awards	Outstanding Director	Nickel Boys	Won	
2025	Black Reel Awards	Outstanding Screenplay	Nickel Boys	Won	
2025	Black Reel Awards	Outstanding Emerging Director	Nickel Boys	Won	
2025	Black Reel Awards	Outstanding First Screenplay	Nickel Boys	Won	
2025	NAACP Image Awards	Outstanding Directing in a Motion Picture	Nickel Boys	Won	
2025	NAACP Image Awards	Outstanding Writing in a Motion Picture	Nickel Boys	Won	
2025	USC Scripter Awards	Film	Nickel Boys	Nominated	
2025	Academy Awards	Best Adapted Screenplay	Nickel Boys	Nominated	
