= We Grown Now =

2023 drama film by Minhal Baig

- Theatrical release poster
- Directed by: Minhal Baig
- Written by: Minhal Baig
- Produced by: Minhal Baig; Joe Pirro
- Starring: Blake Cameron James; Gian Knight Ramirez; S. Epatha Merkerson; Lil Rel Howery; Jurnee Smollett
- Cinematography: Pat Scola
- Edited by: Stephanie Filo
- Music by: Jay Wadley
- Production companies: Participant; Symbolic Exchange; Stage 6 Films
- Distributed by: Sony Pictures Classics; Stage 6 Films
- Release dates: September 8, 2023 (TIFF); April 19, 2024 (United States)
- Running time: 93 minutes
- Country: United States
- Language: English
- Box office: $296,535

We Grown Now is a 2023 American coming-of-age hood film written, directed and co-produced by Minhal Baig. It stars Blake Cameron James, Gian Knight Ramirez, S. Epatha Merkerson, Avery Holliday, Ora Jones, Lil Rel Howery and Jurnee Smollett.

We Grown Now had its world premiere at the 2023 Toronto International Film Festival on September 8, 2023. The film was released in select cinemas in the United States on April 19, 2024, by Sony Pictures Classics and Stage 6 Films.

== Plot ==
In 1992, Malik and Eric are two best friends living in Chicago’s Cabrini–Green Homes housing complex and attending elementary school together. Malik - a mischievous but friendly boy - lives in a loving apartment with his single mother Dolores, grandmother Anita, and younger sister Dee, while Eric - who is slightly more introverted - lives in a colder home in the floor above with his single father Jason and older sister Amber. The two boys love to spend their time at the park playing a game called “jumping”, in which they attempt to hurdle over a stack of mattresses.

Increased levels of racial violence in the area culminate in the fatal shooting of Dantrelle, a boy in the grade below Malik and Eric. In retaliation, Mayor Richard M. Daley cracks down on activity in the neighborhood by forcing everyone at the complex to carry identification cards and performing unwarranted drug searches late at night. Fed up with the increased oppression, and struggling with their own mortality in the wake of Dantrelle’s death, Malik and Eric flee school one day to go visit The Art Institute of Chicago, where they deduce the reality of systemic racism from the paintings there.

Financially struggling to support her family, Dolores is given the opportunity for a job promotion in Peoria. Though she is hesitant to uproot her kids, Anita - having herself moved from Mississippi for better opportunities - encourages her to take it. Malik overhears their conversation, and privately expresses mixed sentiments about doing so. He attempts to bring the idea of leaving Chicago up with Eric, who is unreceptive.

Pressured by his father to succeed on top of everything going on, Eric becomes increasingly withdrawn and, upon learning of the possibility of Malik leaving, accuses Malik of wanting to leave him behind. Although Malik dreams of a better life, during a school assignment, he admits that he has learned that the people one meets are what truly make a home, and that he found that with Eric. An embittered Eric sees this, resulting in a scuffle that injures Malik.

Malik’s family makes preparations to leave. Eric, remorseful for his actions, is hesitant to approach Malik, but is encouraged by Jason to do so. After imagining his family living in the apartment one last time, Malik meets up with Eric. Before Malik leaves, the two of them reconcile with him telling Eric a jumping trick: “Don’t be afraid to fly”.

== Cast ==
- Blake Cameron James as Malik
- Gian Knight Ramirez as Eric
- S. Epatha Merkerson as Anita
- Avery Holliday as Amber
- Ora Jones as Victoria Lucas
- Lil Rel Howery as Jason
- Jurnee Smollett as Dolores
- Giovani Chambers as Slug

== Production ==
In May 2022, it was announced Minhal Baig would write and direct the film, with principal photography commencing in and around Chicago.

== Release ==
We Grown Now had its world premiere at the 2023 Toronto International Film Festival on September 8, 2023.

On October 4, 2023, Sony Pictures Classics acquired distribution rights to the film. It had a limited theatrical release in the United States on April 19, 2024.

== Reception ==
=== Box office ===
We Grown Now grossed $35,344 from 9 theatres during its opening weekend in the United States.

=== Critical response ===
On the review aggregator website Rotten Tomatoes, 93% of 73 critics' reviews are positive, with an average rating of 7.9/10. The website's consensus reads: "Casting grim environs in a nostalgic glow, We Grown Now is a coming-of-age story whose tinges of fantasy only make it feel more honest." Metacritic, which uses a weighted average, assigned the film a score of 76 out of 100, based on 21 critics, indicating "generally favorable" reviews.

=== Accolades ===
At the 2023 Toronto International Film Festival, the film was the winner of the Changemaker Award. The film also won the Audience Choice Award for Best U.S. Feature at the 2023 Chicago International Film Festival. In 2025 received a nomination at the NAACP Image Award for Outstanding Independent Motion Picture.
