= Joslyn Barnes =

American film producer

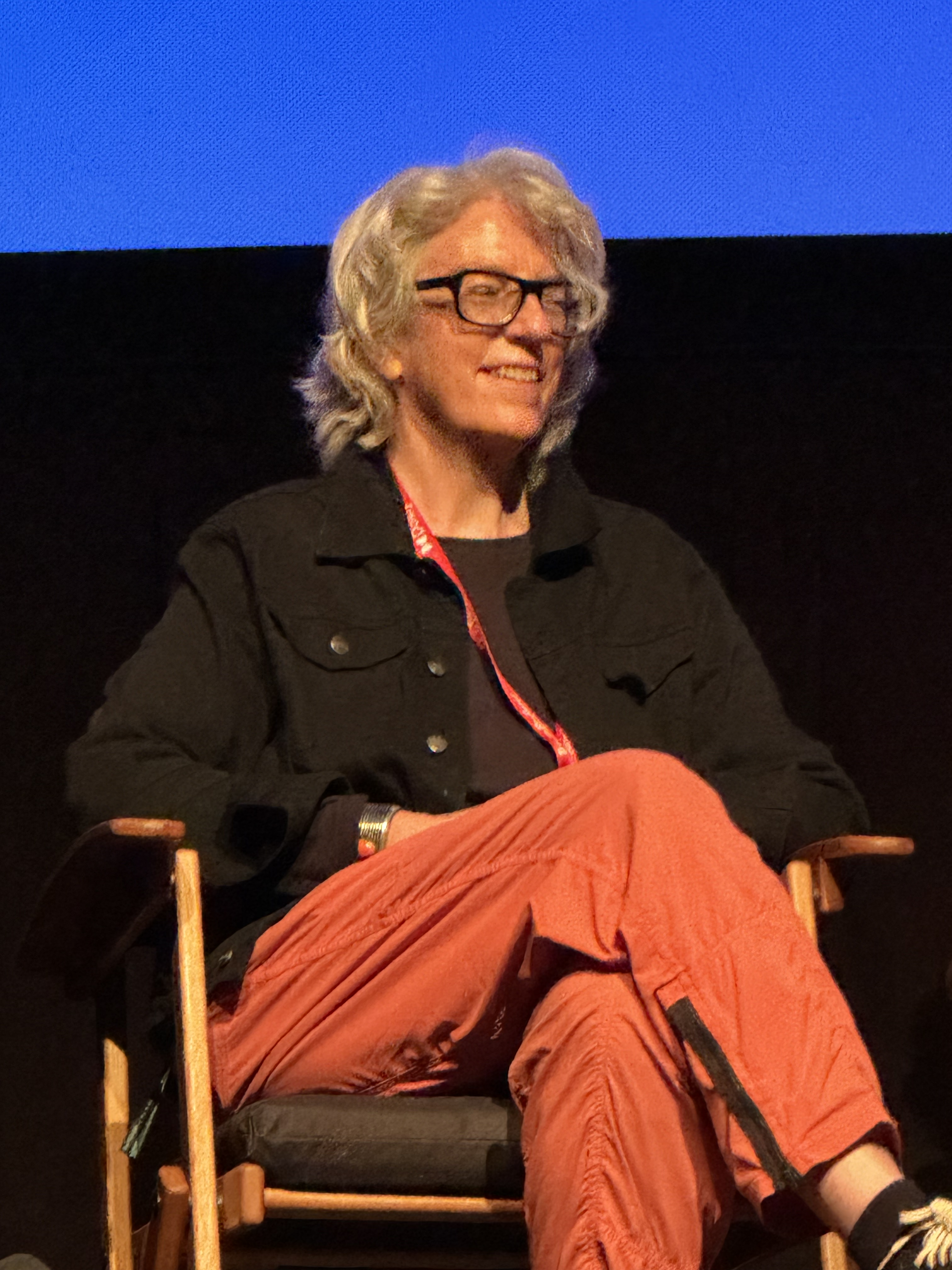
- Barnes at Telluride 2024
- Occupations: Producer and writer
- Website: louverturefilms.com

Joslyn Barnes is a film producer and writer. Known for Bamako (2006), The Black Power Mixtape 1967-1975 (2011), Cemetery of Splendour (2015), White Sun (2016), Zama (2017), Strong Island (2017) for which she received an Emmy Award for Exceptional Merit in Documentary Filmmaking and an Academy Award for Best Documentary Feature nomination, and Hale County This Morning, This Evening (2018) for which she received an Oscar nomination again for Best Documentary Feature. Barnes also produced and co-wrote the 2024 drama Nickel Boys (adapted from Colson Whitehead's titular novel), along with co-writer and director RaMell Ross, and was nominated for the Academy Awards for Best Picture and Best Adapted Screenplay.

== Filmography ==
- 2024: Nickel Boys (Full-length feature film) (producer; co-writer, w/ RaMell Ross)
- 2019: Easter Snap (Documentary short) (producer - produced by)
- 2018: Angels Are Made of Light (Documentary) (co-producer)
- 2018: Aquarela (Documentary) (co-producer) (post-production)
- 2018: Capernaum (executive-producer)
- 2018: Hale County This Morning, This Evening (Documentary) (producer - produced by)
- 2017: Sollers Point (co-producer)
- 2017: That Summer (Documentary) (producer - produced by)
- 2017: This Is Congo (Documentary) (executive producer)
- 2017: Zama (co-producer)
- 2017: The Maribor Uprisings (Documentary) (consulting producer)
- 2017: House in the Fields (Documentary) (executive producer)
- 2017: Strong Island (Documentary) (producer - produced by)
- 2016: The Strange Eyes of Dr. Myes (TV Series) (executive producer - 1 episode)
- 2016: White Sun (producer - produced by)
- 2016: Shadow World (Documentary) (producer - produced by)
- 2016: Cameraperson (Documentary) (consulting producer)
- 2015: This Changes Everything (Documentary) (producer - produced by)
- 2015: Incorruptible (Documentary) (consulting producer)
- 2015: Cemetery of Splendour (co-producer)
- 2015: The Strange Eyes of Dr. Myes (executive producer)
- 2014: Life Is Sacred (Documentary) (executive producer)
- 2014: The Narrow Frame of Midnight (producer)
- 2014: Concerning Violence (Documentary) (co-producer)
- 2013: For Those Who Can Tell No Tales (executive producer)
- 2013: The Welcome Table Project (TV Series documentary short) (producer)
- 2012: Highway (co-producer)
- 2012: The House I Live In (Documentary) (executive producer)
- 2012: Shenandoah (Documentary) (executive producer)
- 2011: Dum Maaro Dum (executive producer)
- 2011: The Black Power Mixtape 1967-1975 (Documentary) (co-producer)
- 2010: The Disappearance of McKinley Nolan (Documentary) (executive producer)
- 2010: Uncle Boonmee Who Can Recall His Past Lives (associate producer: Louverture Films)
- 2009: The Time that Remains (associate producer)
- 2009: Soundtrack for a Revolution (Documentary) (producer)
- 2008: Salt of This Sea (co-producer)
- 2008: Africa Unite: A Celebration of Bob Marley's 60th Birthday (Documentary) (executive producer)
- 2008: Trouble the Water (Documentary) (executive producer)
- 2006: Bamako (executive producer)
- 2000: Bàttu (associate producer)

== Recognition and awards ==
In 2025, Barnes was appointed as a member of the jury at the 78th Locarno Film Festival for Concorso Internazionale – Main Competition.
