= Black Reel Award for Outstanding Television Movie or Limited Series =

Annual US television award

- Awarded for: Outstanding Television Movie or Limited Series
- Country: United States
- Presented by: Black Reel Awards
- First award: 2000
- Currently held by: The Best Man: The Final Chapters (2023)
- Website: blackreelawards.com

This article lists the winners and nominees for the Black Reel Award for Outstanding Television Movie or Limited Series. As of the 2016 ceremony, Luther is the only television movie or limited series to receive more than one nomination. This award is presented to the producers of the production. In May 2017 the category was moved from the film awards as part of the Black Reel Awards for Television honors thus resulting in two separate winners in 2017.

== Winners and nominees ==
Winners are listed first and highlighted in bold.

=== 2000s ===
Year	Film / Series	Network	Producer(s)	Ref
2000
2000	**Introducing Dorothy Dandridge**	**HBO**	**Halle Berry and Joshua D. Maurer**	
2000	A Lesson Before Dying	HBO	Ted Demme and Ellen Krass	
2000	Having Our Say: The Delany Sisters' First 100 Years	CBS	Camille Cosby and Jeffrey Grant	
2000	Funny Valentines	HBO	Ron Stacker Thompson and Ashley Tyler	
2000	Jackie's Back	Lifetime	Gideon Amir	
2000	Love Songs	Showtime	Steven Hewitt	
2000	Strange Justice	Showtime	Jacob Epstein and Steven Haft	
2001
2001	**The Corner**	**HBO**	**Nina Kostroff Noble**	
2001	Disappearing Acts	HBO	Lydia Dean Pilcher	
2001	Freedom Song	TNT	Amanda DiGiulio	
2001	Holiday Heart	Showtime	Cheryl West	
2001	Sally Hemings: American Scandal	PBS	Marty Eli Schwartz and Gerrit van der Meer	
2002
2002	**Boycott**	**HBO**	**Clark Johnson**	
2002	3 A.M.	Showtime	Lee Davis	
2002	A Huey P. Newton Story	Starz	Spike Lee	
2002	Dancing in September	HBO	Reggie Rock Bythewood	
2002	Stranger Inside	HBO	Cheryl Dunye	
2003
2003	**The Rosa Parks Story**	**CBS**	**Paris Qualles**	
2003	Keep the Faith, Baby	Showtime	Art Washington	
2003	Lift	Showtime	DeMane Davis	
2004
2004	**Deacons for Defense**	**Showtime**	**Robert Rehme**	
2004	The Cheetah Girls	Disney Channel	Jacqueline George	
2004	D.C. Sniper: 23 Days of Fear	USA Network	Orly Adelson and Jonathan Eskenas	
2004	Good Fences	Showtime	Danny Glover and Whoopi Goldberg	
2004	Sounder	ABC	Howard Braunstein and Bill Cain	
2005
2005	**Something the Lord Made**	**HBO**	**Robert W. Cort and Eric Hetzel**	
2005	Beah: A Black Woman Speaks	HBO	Jonathan Demme and Joe Viola	
2005	Redemption: The Stan Tookie Williams Story	FX	Sue Bugden and Rudy Langlais	
2006
2006	**Lackawanna Blues**	**HBO**	**Halle Berry and Vincent Cirrincione**	
2006	Kojak	USA Network	Tom Thayer and Steve Feke	
2006	Miracle's Boys	TeenNick	Nicole Silver and Orly Wiseman	
2006	Sometimes in April	HBO	Daniel Delume	
2006	Their Eyes Were Watching God	ABC	Quincy Jones and Oprah Winfrey	
2007
2007	**Walkout**	**HBO**	**Moctesuma Esparza and Robert A. Katz**	
2008	—N/a			

=== 2010s ===
Year	Film / Series	Network	Producer(s)/Showrunners(s)	Ref
2010–11	—N/a			
2012
2012	**Thurgood**	**HBO**	**Bill Haber and George Stevens Jr.**	
2012	Five	Lifetime	Jennifer Aniston, Marta Kauffman and Paula Wagner	
2012	Luther	BBC America	Katie Swinden	
2012	The Sunset Limited	HBO	Barbara Hall	
2012	Taken from Me: The Tiffany Rubin Story	Lifetime	Harvey Kahn	
2013
2013	**A Beautiful Soul**	**TV One**	**Holly Carter and Dominique Telson**	
2013	Let It Shine	Disney Channel	Amy Gibbons and Paul Hoen	
2013	Raising Izzie	UP	Angelique Bones	
2013	Somebody's Child	UP	David Eubanks, Keith Neal and Eric Tomosunas	
2013	Steel Magnolias	Lifetime	Neil Meron and Craig Zadan	
2014
2014	**Mike Tyson: Undisputed Truth**	**HBO**	**Spike Lee and Mike Tyson**	
2014	Being Mary Jane	BET	Gabrielle Union, Salim Akil and Mara Brock Akil	
2014	Betty and Coretta	Lifetime	Polly Anthony and Jaja Johnson	
2014	CrazySexyCool: The TLC Story	VH1	Bill Diggins and Jill Holmes	
2014	The Watsons Go to Birmingham	Hallmark	Tonya Lewis Lee	
2015
2015	**The Trip to Bountiful**	**Lifetime**	**Bill Haber and Jeff Hayes**	
2015	A Day Late and a Dollar Short	Lifetime	Jeffrey M. Hayes	
2015	Gun Hill	BET	Reggie Rock Bythewood	
2015	Rosemary's Baby	NBC	Zoe Saldaña, Tom Patricia and Robert Bernacchi	
2015	Seasons of Love	Lifetime	Joshua A. Green and Yaron Schwartzman	
2016
2016	**Bessie**	**HBO**	**Ron Schmidt**	
2016	American Crime	ABC	Ed Tapla and Lori-Etta Taub	
2016	The Book of Negroes	BET	Damon D'Oliveira and Clement Virgo	
2016	Luther	BBC America	Marcus Wilson	
2016	Show Me a Hero	HBO	Gail Mutrux	
2017
2017	**The People v. O. J. Simpson: American Crime Story**	**FX**	**Chip Vucelich, Alexis Martin Woodall and John Travolta**	
2017	American Crime	ABC	Lori-Etta Taub	
2017	Confirmation	HBO	Darren M. Demetre	
2017	Love Under New Management: The Miki Howard Story	TV One	Carl Craig, Teyonah Parris, Ron Robinson and Eric Tomosunas	
2017	Roots	History Channel	Ann Kindberg and Alissa M. Kantrow	
2017
2017	**The New Edition Story**	**BET**	**Brooke Payne, Jesse Collins, Debra Lee, Ralph E. Tresvant, Ricky Bell, Johnny Gill, Bobby Brown, Ronnie DeVoe, Stephen Hill, Michael Bivins, Chris Robinson, Valerie Bleth Sharp**	
2017	American Crime	ABC	John Ridley, Julie Hébert	
2017	The Immortal Life of Henrietta Lacks	HBO	Kathryn Dean, Alan Ball, Oprah Winfrey, Peter Macdissi, Carla Gardini, Lydia Dean Pilcher	
2017	Guerrilla	Showtime	John Ridley	
2017	Shots Fired	FOX	Gina Prince-Bythewood & Reggie Rock Bythewood	
2018
2018	**Seven Seconds**	**Netflix**	**Veena Sud**	
2018	Black Mirror	Netflix	Charlie Brooker	
2018	Flint	Lifetime	Shakim Compere, Queen Latifah, Katie Couric, John M. Eckert, Mark Nicholson, Craig Zadan	
2018	Marvel's The Defenders	Netflix	Douglas Petrie & Marco Ramirez	
2018	The Murders of Tupac and the Notorious B.I.G.	USA Network	Kyle Long	
2019
2019	**When They See Us**	**Netflix**	**Ava DuVernay**	
2019	Luther	BBC One	Neil Cross	
2019	Native Son	HBO Films	Alex Ernst, Duccio Fabbri, Eric Hollenbeck, Matthew Perniciaro, Michael Sherman	
2019	The Bobby Brown Story	BET	Bobby Brown, Sheyna Kathleen Smith, Carl Craig, Dionne Harmon, Jesse Collins	
2019	True Detective	HBO	Nic Pizzolatto	

=== 2020s ===
Year	Film / Series	Network	Producer(s)/ Showrunners	Ref
2020
2020	**Watchmen**	**HBO**	**Damon Lindelof**	
2020	The Clark Sisters: First Ladies of Gospel	Lifetime	Holly Davis Carter, Ronnie J. Pitre, Missy Elliott, Mary J. Blige, Queen Latifah, Shakim Compere, Loretha C. Jones, Steve Solomos	
2020	Hollywood	Netflix	Ian Brennan	
2020	Little Fires Everywhere	Hulu	Liz Tigelaar	
2020	Self Made: Inspired by the Life of Madam C. J. Walker	Netflix	Elle Johnson	
2021
2021	**I May Destroy You**	**HBO**	**Michaela Coel**	
2021	Hamilton	Disney+	Lin-Manuel Miranda, Thomas Kail, Jeffrey Seller	
2021	Sylvie's Love	Amazon Studios	Eugene Ashe, Nnamdi Asomugha, Jonathan T. Baker	
2021	Small Axe	Amazon Prime Video / BBC One	Steve McQueen	
2021	The Underground Railroad	Amazon Prime Video	Barry Jenkins	
2022
2022	**The Last Days of Ptolemy Grey**	**Apple TV+**	**Diane Houslin**	
2022	Colin in Black & White	Netflix	Michael Starrbury	
2022	DMZ	HBO Max	Roberto Patino	
2022	True Story	Netflix	Eric Newman	
2022	We Own This City	HBO	George Pelecanos	
2023
2023	**The Best Man: The Final Chapters**	**Peacock**	**Malcolm D. Lee**	
2023	Black Girl Missing	Lifetime	[data missing]	
2023	Entergalactic	Netflix	Michael Penketh, Mike Moon	
2023	Praise This	Peacock	Will Packer, Tim Story, James Lopez	
2023	Swarm	Amazon Prime Video	Janine Nabers	

== Programs with multiple nominations ==
Totals include continuing series, but not sequels or revivals.

3 nominations

- American Crime
- Luther

== Total awards by network ==
- HBO - 11
- Netflix - 2
- BET - 1
- CBS - 1
- FX - 1
- Lifetime - 1
- Showtime - 1
- TV One - 1
