= Black Reel Award for Outstanding Screenplay, TV Movie or Limited Series =

Annual US television award

- Awarded for: Outstanding Screenplay, TV Movie or Limited Series
- Country: United States
- Presented by: Black Reel Awards
- First award: 2000
- Currently held by: Eugene Ashe; Sylvie's Love (2021)
- Website: blackreelawards.com

This article lists the winners and nominees for the Black Reel Award for Outstanding Screenplay of a Television Movie or Limited Series. As of the 2016 ceremony, Reggie Rock Bythewood is the only writer to win the award twice and David Simon is the only other person to have achieved a second nomination. In May 2017 the category was moved from the film awards as part of the Black Reel Awards for Television honors thus resulting in two separate winners in 2017.

== Winners and nominees ==
Winners are listed first and highlighted in bold.

=== 2000s ===
Year	Writer	Film	Network	Ref
2000
2000	**Ernest J. Gaines**	**A Lesson Before Dying**	**HBO**	
2000	Annie Elizabeth Delany and Sarah Louise Delany	Having Our Say: The Delany Sisters' First 100 Years	CBS	
2000	Amy Schor Ferris, Ron Stacker Thompson and Ashley Tyler	Funny Valentines	HBO	
2000	Charles Fuller	Love Songs	Showtime	
2001
2001	**David Simon and David Mills**	**The Corner**	**HBO**	
2001	Tina Andrews	Sally Hemings: American Scandal	PBS	
2001	Lisa Jones and Terry McMillan	Disappearing Acts	HBO	
2001	Stewart St. John	Seventeen Again	Showtime	
2001	Cheryl West	Holiday Heart	Showtime	
2002
2002	**Reggie Rock Bythewood**	**Dancing in September**	**HBO**	
2002	Catherine Crouch and Cheryl Dunye	Stranger Inside	HBO	
2002	Lee Davis	3 A.M.	Showtime	
2002	Shauneille Perry	The Old Settler	PBS	
2002	Roger Guenveur Smith	A Huey P. Newton Story	Starz	
2003
2003	**Paris Qualles**	**The Rosa Parks Story**	**CBS**	
2003	David Isay, LeAlan Jones and Lloyd Newman	Our America	Showtime	
2003	Art Washington	Keep the Faith, Baby	Showtime	
2004
2004	**Frank Military and Richard Wesley**	**Deacons for Defense**	**Showtime**	
2004	Bill Cain	Sounder	ABC	
2004	Trey Ellis	Good Fences	Showtime	
2005
2005	**J.T. Allen**	**Redemption: The Stan Tookie Williams Story**	**FX**	
2005	Lisa Gay Hamilton	Beah: A Black Woman Speaks	HBO	
2005	Jim McKay	Everyday People	HBO	
2006
2006	**Ruben Santiago-Hudson**	**Lackawanna Blues**	**HBO**	
2006	Kevin Arkadie, Stephen Langford and Dawn Urbont	Miracle's Boys	TeenNick	
2006	Suzan-Lori Parks, Misan Sagay and Bobby Smith Jr.	Their Eyes Were Watching God	ABC	
2006	Raoul Peck	Sometimes in April	HBO	
2006	Alex Tse	Sucker Free City	Showtime	
2007
2007	**Ernie Contreras, Marcus DeLeon and Timothy J. Sexton**	**Walkout**	**HBO**	
2008	—N/a			

=== 2010s ===
Year	Writer	Film	Network	Ref
2010–12	—N/a			
2013
2013	**Elizabeth Hunter**	**Abducted: The Carlina White Story**	**Lifetime**	
2013	Eric Daniel	Let It Shine	Disney Channel	
2013	David Martyn Conley	Raising Izzie	UP	
2013	Siddeeqah Powell	Somebody's Child	UP	
2013	Cas Sigers	A Cross to Bear	UP	
2014
2014	**Mara Brock Akil**	**Being Mary Jane**	**BET**	
2014	Rhonda Baraka	Pastor Brown	Lifetime	
2014	Caliope Brattlestreet, Stephen Glantz and Tonya Lewis Lee	The Watsons Go to Birmingham	Hallmark	
2014	Kate Lanier	CrazySexyCool: The TLC Story	VH1	
2014	Kiki Tyson	Mike Tyson: Undisputed Truth	HBO	
2015
2015	**Reggie Rock Bythewood**	**Gun Hill**	**BET**	
2015	Stan Foster	My Other Mother	UP	
2015	Princess Monique	Seasons of Love	Lifetime	
2015	Russ Parr and R.L. Scott	The Fright Night Files	TVOne	
2015	Ryan Richmond	Lyfe's Journey	UP	
2016
2016	**John Ridley**	**American Crime**	**ABC**	
2016	Christopher Cleveland, Bettina Gilois and Dee Rees	Bessie	HBO	
2016	Stacy A. Littlejohn	American Crime	ABC	
2016	David Simon and William F. Zorzi	Show Me a Hero	HBO	
2016	Clement Virgo	The Book of Negroes	BET	
2017
2017	**Joe Robert Cole**	**The People v. O. J. Simpson: American Crime Story**	**FX**	
2017	John Ridley	American Crime	ABC	
2017	Stella Meghie	Jean of the Joneses	TV One	
2017	Christine Swanson and Rhonda Baraka	Love Under New Management: The Miki Howard Story	TV One	
2017	Joe Robert Cole	The People v. O. J. Simpson: American Crime Story	FX	
2017
2017	**George C. Wolfe**	**The Immortal Life of Henrietta Lacks**	**HBO**	
2017	Kirk A. Moore	American Crime - Episode "Season Three: Episode Seven"	ABC	
2017	Abdul Williams	The New Edition Story	BET	
2017	John Ridley	American Crime - Episode "Season Three: Episode, One"	ABC	
2017	Gina Prince-Bythewood & Reggie Rock Bythewood	Shots Fired- Episode "Hour One: Pilot"	FOX	
2018
2018	**Veena Sud & Shalisha Francis**	**Seven Seconds- Episode "A Boy and a Bike"**	**Netflix**	
2018	Kyle Long	The Murders of Tupac and the Notorious B.I.G.	USA Network	
2018	Rhonda Baraka	Bobbi Kristina	TV One	
2018	Dee Rees	Electric Dreams	Amazon Prime Video	
2018	Denitria Harris-Lawrence	The Murders of Tupac and the Notorious B.I.G.	USA Network	
2019
2019	**Ava DuVernay, Julian Breece & Attica Locke**	**When They See Us**	**Netflix**	
2019	Ava DuVernay& Robin Swicord	When They See Us	Netflix	
2019	Ava DuVernay, Julian Breece & Attica Locke	When They See Us	Netflix	
2019	Abdul Williams	The Bobby Brown Story	BET	
2019	Ava DuVernay& Michael Starrbury	When They See Us	Netflix	

=== 2020s ===
Year	Writer(s)	Film	Network	Ref
2020
2020	**Damon Lindelof & Christal Henry**	**Watchmen**	**HBO**	
2020	Sylvia L. Jones & Camille Tucker	The Clark Sisters: First Ladies of Gospel	Lifetime	
2020	Raamla Mohamed	Little Fires Everywhere	HULU	
2020	Tanya Barfield	Mrs. America	FX	
2020	Damon Lindelof & Cord Jefferson	Watchmen	HBO	
2021
2021	**Eugene Ashe**	**Sylvie's Love**	**Amazon Studios**	
2021	Michaela Coel	I May Destroy You - "Ego Death"	HBO	
2021	Michaela Coel	I May Destroy You - Episode - "...It Just Came Up"	HBO	
2021	Steve McQueen (director) & Courttia Newland	Small Axe- "Lovers Rock"	Amazon Prime Video	
2021	Barry Jenkins	The Underground Railroad - Episode "Chapter 1: Georgia"	Amazon Prime Video	

== Total awards by network ==
- HBO - 7
- BET - 2
- FX - 2
- Netflix - 2
- ABC - 1
- Amazon Studios - 1
- CBS - 1
- Lifetime - 1
- Showtime - 1

== Individuals with multiple awards ==
2 awards

- Reggie Rock Bythewood

== Individuals with multiple nominations ==
4 Nominations

- Ava DuVernay

3 Nominations

- Rhonda Baraka
- Reggie Rock Bythewood
- John Ridley

2 Nominations

- Julian Breece
- Michaela Coel
- Joe Robert Cole
- Damon Lindelof
- Attica Locke
- Dee Rees
- David Simon
- Abdul Williams

== Programs with multiple nominations ==
6 nominations

- American Crime

4 nominations

- When They See Us

2 nominations

- American Crime Story
- I May Destroy You
- Watchmen
- The Murders of Tupac and the Notorious B.I.G.
