= Black Reel Award for Outstanding Director, TV Movie or Limited Series =

Annual US television award

Black Reel Award for Outstanding Directing, TV Movie or Limited Series
- Awarded for: Outstanding Directing, TV Movie or Limited Series
- Country: United States
- Presented by: Black Reel Awards
- First award: 2000; 26 years ago
- Currently held by: Steve McQueen; Small Axe (2021)
- Website: blackreelawards.com

This article lists the winners and nominees for the Black Reel Award for Outstanding Director of a Television Movie or Limited Series. The category was retired during the 2008 ceremony, and then later returned in 2013. In May 2017 the category was moved from the film awards as part of the Black Reel Awards for Television honors thus resulting in two separate winners in 2017.

== Winners and nominees ==
Winners are listed first and highlighted in bold.

=== 2000s ===
Year	Director	Film	Network	Ref
2000
2000	**Louis Gossett Jr.**	**Love Songs**	**Showtime**	
2000	Charles Burnett	Selma, Lord, Selma	ABC	
2000	Julie Dash	Funny Valentines	HBO	
2000	Ernest R. Dickerson	Strange Justice	Showtime	
2000	Robert Townsend	Jackie's Back	Lifetime	
2001
2001	**Charles S. Dutton**	**The Corner**	**HBO**	
2001	Jeffrey W. Byrd	Seventeen Again	Showtime	
2001	Julie Dash	Love Song	MTV	
2001	Gina Prince-Bythewood	Disappearing Acts	HBO	
2001	Robert Townsend	Holiday Heart	Showtime	
2002
2002	**Reggie Rock Bythewood**	**Dancing in September**	**HBO**	
2002	Lee Davis	3 A.M.	Showtime	
2002	Cheryl Dunye	Stranger Inside	HBO	
2002	Spike Lee	A Huey P. Newton Story	Starz'	
2002	Euzhan Palcy	The Killing Yard	Showtime	
2003
2003	**Robert Townsend**	**10,000 Black Men Named George**	**Showtime**	
2003	Julie Dash	The Rosa Parks Story	CBS	
2003	Doug McHenry	Keep the Faith, Baby	Showtime	
2004
2004	**Bill Duke**	**Deacons for Defense**	**Showtime**	
2004	Ernest R. Dickerson	Good Fences	Showtime	
2004	Kevin Hooks	Sounder	ABC	
2005
2005	**Vondie Curtis-Hall**	**Redemption: The Stan Tookie Williams Story**	**FX**	
2005	Lisa Gay Hamilton	Beah: A Black Woman Speaks	HBO	
2005	Joseph Sargent	Something the Lord Made	HBO	
2006
2006	**George C. Wolfe**	**Lackawanna Blues**	**HBO**	
2006	Kevin Arkadie, Neema Barnette, Levar Burton, Ernest R. Dickerson, Bill Duke and Spike Lee	Miracle's Boys	TeenNick	
2006	Spike Lee	Sucker Free City	Showtime	
2006	Darnell Martin	Their Eyes Were Watching God	ABC	
2006	Raoul Peck	Sometimes in April	HBO	
2007
2007	**Edward James Olmos**	**Walkout**	**HBO**	
2008	—N/a			

=== 2010s ===
Year	Director	Film	Network	Ref
2010–12	—N/a			
2013
2013	**Vondie Curtis-Hall**	**Abducted: The Carlina White Story**	**Lifetime**	
2013	Roger M. Bobb	Raising Izzie	UP	
2013	Kenny Leon	Steel Magnolias	Lifetime	
2013	Darnell Martin	Firelight	ABC	
2013	Billie Woodruff	Rags	Nickelodeon	
2014
2014	**Spike Lee**	**Mike Tyson: Undisputed Truth**	**HBO**	
2014	Salim Akil	Being Mary Jane	HBO	
2014	Rockmond Dunbar	Pastor Brown	Lifetime	
2014	Kenny Leon	The Watsons Go to Birmingham	Hallmark	
2014	Charles Stone III	CrazySexyCool: The TLC Story	VH1	
2015
2015	**Reggie Rock Bythewood**	**Gun Hill**	**BET**	
2015	Sharon Brathwaite-Sanders and Peres Owino	Seasons of Love	Lifetime	
2015	Shernold Edwards	A Day Late and a Dollar Short	Lifetime	
2015	Dayna Lynne North	An En Vogue Christmas	Lifetime	
2015	Kimberly Walker	Comeback Dad	UP	
2016
2016	**Dee Rees**	**Bessie**	**HBO**	
2016	Angela Bassett	Whitney	Lifetime	
2016	Regina King	Let the Church Say Amen	BET	
2016	John Ridley	American Crime	ABC	
2016	Clement Virgo	The Book of Negroes	BET	
2017
2017	**John Singleton**	**The People v. O. J. Simpson: American Crime Story**	**FX**	
2017	Angela Bassett	American Horror Story: Roanoke	FX	
2017	Thomas Carter	Roots	History Channel	
2017	Anthony Hemingway	The People v. O. J. Simpson: American Crime Story	FX	
2017	John Ridley	American Crime	ABC	
2017
2017	**Chris Robinson**	**The New Edition Story**	**BET**	
2017	Victoria Mahoney	American Crime - Episode "Season Three: Episode Three"	ABC	
2017	Kevin Hooks	Madiba	BET	
2017	Tanya Hamilton	American Crime - Episode "Season Three: Episode, Five"	ABC	
2017	George C. Wolfe	The Immortal Life of Henrietta Lacks	HBO	
2018
2018	**Anthony Hemingway**	**The Murders of Tupac and the Notorious B.I.G.- Episode "Wherever It Leads"**	**USA Network**	
2018	Angela Bassett	American Horror Story: Cult- Episode "Drink the Kool Aid"	FX	
2018	Ernest R. Dickerson	Seven Seconds- Episode "Until It Do"	Netflix	
2018	Dee Rees	Electric Dreams- Episode "Kill All Others"	Amazon Prime Video	
2018	Victoria Mahoney	Seven Seconds- Episode "Witnesses for the Prosecution"	Netflix	
2019
2019	**Ava DuVernay**	**When They See Us**	**Netflix**	
2019	Clark Johnson	Juanita	Netflix	
2019	Rashid Johnson	Native Son	HBO	
2019	Kiel Adrian Scott	The Bobby Brown Story	BET	
2019	Victoria Mahoney	The Red Line- Episode "We Must All Care"	CBS	

=== 2020s ===
Year	Director(s)	Film	Network	Ref
2020
2020	**Stephen Williams**	**Watchmen Episode "This Extraordinary Being"**	**HBO**	
2020	Christine Swanson	The Clark Sisters: First Ladies of Gospel	Lifetime	
2020	Nzingha Stewart	Little Fires Everywhere - Episode "Picture Perfect"	HULU	
2020	Janet Mock	Hollywood- Episode "(Screen) Test"	Netflix	
2020	Stephen Williams	Watchmen- Episode "She Was Killed by Space Junk"	HBO	
2021
2021	**Steve McQueen**	**Small Axe- Film: Lovers Rock**	**Amazon Prime Video**	
2021	Michaela Coel & Sam Miller	I May Destroy You - Episode "Ego Death"	HBO	
2021	Steve McQueen	Small Axe- Film: Mangrove	Amazon Prime Video	
2021	Eugene Ashe	Sylvie's Love	Amazon Studios	
2021	Barry Jenkins	The Underground Railroad"	Amazon Prime Video	

== Total awards by network ==
- HBO – 7
- Showtime – 3
- BET - 2
- FX - 2
- Amazon Prime Video - 1
- Lifetime - 1
- Netflix - 1
- USA Network - 1

== Programs with multiple nominations ==
4 nominations

- American Crime (ABC)

3 nominations

- American Horror Story (FX)

2 nominations

- American Crime Story (FX)
- Seven Seconds (Netflix)
- Small Axe (Amazon Prime Video)
- Watchmen (HBO)

== Individuals with multiple awards ==
2 awards

- Reggie Rock Bythewood
- Vondie Curtis-Hall

== Individuals with multiple nominations ==
4 nominations

- Ernest R. Dickerson
- Spike Lee

3 nominations

- Angela Bassett
- Julie Dash
- Victoria Mahoney
- Robert Townsend

2 nominations

- Reggie Rock Bythewood
- Vondie Curtis-Hall
- Bill Duke
- Anthony Hemingway
- Kevin Hooks
- Kenny Leon
- Darnell Martin
- Steve McQueen
- Dee Rees
- John Ridley
- Stephen Williams
- George C. Wolfe
