= Black Reel Award for Outstanding Supporting Actress, TV Movie or Limited Series =

Annual US television award

- Awarded for: Outstanding Supporting Actress, TV Movie or Limited Series
- Country: United States
- Presented by: Black Reel Awards
- First award: 2000
- Currently held by: Weruche Opia, I May Destroy You (2021)
- Website: blackreelawards.com

This article lists the winners and nominees for the Black Reel Award for Outstanding Supporting Actress in a Television Movie or Limited Series. The category was retired during the 2008 ceremony, but later returned in 2013. In May 2017 the category was moved from the film awards as part of the Black Reel Awards for Television honors thus resulting in two separate winners in 2017.

== Winners and nominees ==
Winners are listed first and highlighted in bold.

=== 2000s ===
Year	Actor	Film	Network	Ref
2000
2000	**Cicely Tyson**	**A Lesson Before Dying**	**HBO**	
2000	Lisa Arrindell	A Lesson Before Dying	HBO	
2000	Loretta Devine	Funny Valentines	HBO	
2000	Irma P. Hall	A Lesson Before Dying	HBO	
2000	Jurnee Smollett-Bell	Selma, Lord, Selma	ABC	
2001
2001	**Diahann Carroll**	**Sally Hemings: An American Scandal**	**PBS**	
2001	Lisa Arrindell	Disappearing Acts	HBO	
2001	Kim Fields	Hidden Blessings	BET	
2001	Regina Hall	Disappearing Acts	HBO	
2001	Jesika Reynolds	Holiday Heart	Showtime	
2002
2002	**Kimberly Elise**	**Bojangles**	**Showtime**	
2002	Davenia McFadden	Stranger Inside	HBO	
2002	C. C. H. Pounder	Boycott	HBO	
2002	Michelle Rodriguez	3 A.M.	Showtime	
2002	Jurnee Smollett-Bell	Ruby's Bucket of Blood	Showtime	
2003
2003	**Cicely Tyson**	**The Rosa Parks Story**	**CBS**	
2003	Lonette McKee	Lift	Showtime	
2003	Vanessa A. Williams	Our America	Showtime	
2004
2004	**Mo'Nique**	**Good Fences**	**Showtime**	
2004	Robin Givens	Hollywood Wives: The New Generation	CBS	
2004	Lynn Whitfield	The Cheetah Girls	Disney Channel	
2005
2005	**C. C. H. Pounder**	**Redemption: The Stan Tookie Williams Story**	**FX**	
2005	Iris Little-Thomas	Everyday People	HBO	
2005	Gabrielle Union	Something the Lord Made	HBO	
2006
2006	**Carmen Ejogo**	**Lackawanna Blues**	**HBO**	
2006	Nicki Micheaux	Their Eyes Were Watching God	ABC	
2006	Rosie Perez	Lackawanna Blues	HBO	
2006	Adina Porter	Lackawanna Blues	HBO	
2006	Jordan Puryear	Miracle's Boys	TeenNick	
2007
2007	**Alfre Woodard**	**The Water is Wide**	**Hallmark**	
2008	—N/a			

=== 2010s ===
Year	Actor	Film	Network	Ref
2010–12	—N/a			
2013
2013	**Alfre Woodard**	**Steel Magnolias**	**Lifetime**	
2013	Adepero Oduye	Steel Magnolias	Lifetime	
2013	Phylicia Rashad	Steel Magnolias	Lifetime	
2013	Gloria Reuben	Jesse Stone: Benefit of the Doubt	CBS	
2013	Jill Scott	Steel Magnolias	Lifetime	
2014
2014	**Octavia Spencer**	**Call Me Crazy: A Five Film**	**Lifetime**	
2014	Loretta Devine	Saving Westbrook High	UP	
2014	Audra McDonald	The Sound of Music Live!	NBC	
2014	Nicole Ari Parker	Pastor Brown	Lifetime	
2014	LaTanya Richardson	The Watsons Go to Birmingham	Hallmark	
2015
2015	**Anika Noni Rose**	**A Day Late and a Dollar Short**	**Lifetime**	
2015	Tichina Arnold	A Day Late and a Dollar Short	Lifetime	
2015	Kimberly Elise	A Day Late and a Dollar Short	Lifetime	
2015	Aisha Hinds	Gun Hill	BET	
2015	Vanessa L. Williams	The Trip to Bountiful	Lifetime	
2016
2016	**Regina King**	**American Crime**	**ABC**	
2016	Angela Bassett	American Horror Story: Hotel	FX	
2016	Mary J. Blige	The Wiz Live!	NBC	
2016	Mo'Nique	Bessie	HBO	
2016	Amber Riley	The Wiz Live!	NBC	
2017
2017	**Regina King**	**American Crime**	**ABC**	
2017	Angela Bassett	American Horror Story: Roanoke	FX	
2017	Emayatzy Corinealdi	Roots	History Channel	
2017	Anika Noni Rose	Roots	History Channel	
2017	Keesha Sharp	The People v. O. J. Simpson: American Crime Story	FX	
2017
2017	**Regina King**	**American Crime**	**ABC**	
2017	Viola Davis	Custody	Lifetime	
2017	Zoe Kravitz	Big Little Lies (TV series)	HBO	
2017	DeWanda Wise	Shots Fired	FOX	
2017	Aisha Hinds	Shots Fired	FOX	
2018
2018	**Letitia Wright**	**Black Mirror**	**Netflix**	
2018	Rosario Dawson	Marvel's the Defenders	Netflix	
2018	Michaela Coel	Black Mirror	Netflix	
2018	Simone Missick	Marvel's the Defenders	Netflix	
2018	Queen Latifah	Flint	Lifetime	
2019
2019	**Marsha Stephanie Blake**	**When They See Us**	**Netflix**	
2019	Carmen Ejogo	True Detective (season 3)	HBO	
2019	Kylie Bunbury	When They See Us	Netflix	
2019	Isis King	When They See Us	Netflix	
2019	Marla Gibbs	Live in Front of a Studio Audience: 'All in the Family' and 'The Jeffersons'	ABC	

=== 2020s ===
Year	Actor	Film	Network	Ref
2020
2020	**Lexi Underwood**	**Little Fires Everywhere**	**HULU**	
2020	Carmen Ejogo	Self Made: Inspired by the Life of Madam C. J. Walker	Netflix	
2020	Raven Goodwin	The Clark Sisters: First Ladies of Gospel	Lifetime	
2020	Viola Davis	Troop Zero	Amazon Prime Video	
2020	Uzo Aduba	Mrs. America	FX	
2021
2021	**Weruche Opia**	**I May Destroy You**	**HBO**	
2021	Teyonah Parris	WandaVision	Disney+	
2021	Renee Elise Goldsberry	Hamilton	Disney+	
2021	Amarah-Jae St. Aubyn	Small Axe	Amazon Prime Video	
2021	Letitia Wright	Small Axe	Amazon Prime Video	

== Superlatives ==
Superlative	Outstanding Supporting Actress, TV Movie/Limited Series
Actress with most awards	Regina King (3)
Actress with most nominations	Carmen Ejogo; Regina King (3)
Actress with most nominations without ever winning	Lisa Arrindell Anderson; Angela Bassett; Viola Davis; Loretta Devine; Aisha Hinds; Jurnee Smollett (2)

== Programs with multiple awards ==
3 wins

- American Crime

== Performers with multiple awards ==
3 wins

- Regina King

2 Wins

- Cicely Tyson
- Alfre Woodard

== Programs with multiple nominations ==
3 nominations

- American Crime
- A Day Late and a Dollar Short
- A Lesson Before Dying
- Lackawanna Blues
- When They See Us

2 nominations

- American Horror Story
- Black Mirror
- Marvel's the Defenders
- Disappearing Acts
- Roots
- Shots Fired
- Small Axe
- The Wiz Live!

== Performers with multiple nominations ==
3 Nominations

- Carmen Ejogo
- Regina King

2 Nominations

- Lisa Arrindell
- Angela Bassett
- Viola Davis
- Loretta Devine
- Kimberly Elise
- Aisha Hinds
- Mo'Nique
- C. C. H. Pounder
- Anika Noni Rose
- Jurnee Smollett
- Cicely Tyson
- Alfre Woodard
- Letitia Wright

== Total awards by network ==
- ABC - 3
- HBO - 3
- Lifetime - 3
- Netflix - 2
- Showtime - 2
- CBS - 1
- FX - 1
- Hallmark - 1
- HULU - 1
- PBS - 1
