= 15th Annual Black Reel Awards =

Film-industry awards in 2015

15th Black Reel Awards
- Date: February 19, 2015
- Location: Washington, D.C.

The 2015 Black Reel Awards, which annually recognize and celebrate the achievements of black people in feature, independent and television films, were announced on Thursday, February 19, 2015. Dear White People and Selma lead all films with ten nominations apiece.

Selma was the big winner of the night winning eight awards including Outstanding Picture, Director (Ava DuVernay) and Actor (David Oyelowo). The Trip to Bountiful and Gun Hill took home three awards followed by Dear White People with two wins.

== Winners and nominees ==
Winners are listed first and highlighted in bold.

Best Film	Best Director
**Selma**; Belle; Beyond the Lights; Dear White People; Top Five	**Ava DuVernay – Selma**; Amma Asante – Belle; Gina Prince-Bythewood – Beyond the Lights; Chris Rock – Top Five; Justin Simien – Dear White People
Best Actor	Best Actress
**David Oyelowo – Selma**; Chadwick Boseman – Get On Up; Nate Parker – Beyond the Lights; Chris Rock – Top Five; Denzel Washington – The Equalizer	**Gugu Mbatha-Raw – Belle**; Rosario Dawson – Top Five; Gugu Mbatha-Raw – Beyond the Lights; Tessa Thompson – Dear White People; Quvenzhané Wallis – Annie
Best Supporting Actor	Best Supporting Actress
**Wendell Pierce – Selma**; Nelsan Ellis – Get On Up; David Oyelowo – A Most Violent Year; Tyler Perry – Gone Girl; Michael K. Williams – The Gambler	**Carmen Ejogo – Selma**; Viola Davis – The Disappearance of Eleanor Rigby; Teyonah Parris – Dear White People; Zoe Saldaña – Guardians of the Galaxy; Octavia Spencer – Snowpiercer
Best Breakthrough Performance, Male	Best Breakthrough Performance, Female
**Tyler James Williams – Dear White People**; Brandon Bell – Dear White People; David Gyasi – Interstellar; Andre Holland – Selma; Stephan James – Selma	**Teyonah Parris – Dear White People**; Jillian Estell – Black or White; Patina Miller – The Hunger Games: Mockingjay – Part 1; Amber Stevens – 22 Jump Street; Kuoth Wiel – The Good Lie
Best Ensemble (Awarded to Casting Directors)	Best Screenplay, Adapted or Original
**Aisha Coley – Selma**; Kerry Barden and Paul Schnee – Get On Up; Kim Coleman – Dear White People; Victoria Thomas – Top Five; Toby Whale – Belle	**Chris Rock – Top Five**; Gina Prince-Bythewood – Beyond the Lights; John Ridley – Jimi: All Is by My Side; Misan Sagay – Belle; Justin Simien – Dear White People
Best Feature Documentary	Best Voice Performance
**Anita: Speaking Truth to the Power – Freida Lee Mock**; I Am Ali – Clare Lewins; Keep On Keepin' On – Alan Hicks; Nas: Time Is Illmatic – One9; Virunga – Orlando von Einsiedel	**Morgan Freeman – The Lego Movie**; Vin Diesel – Guardians of the Galaxy; Maya Rudolph – Big Hero 6; Zoe Saldaña – The Book of Life; Damon Wayans Jr. – Big Hero 6
Best Independent Feature	Best Independent Documentary
**The Retrieval – Chris Eska**; 1982 – Tommy Oliver; Christmas Wedding Baby – Kiara C. Jones; CRU – Alton Glass; Una Vida: A Fable of Music and the Mind – Richie Adams	**25 to Life – Mike Brown**; Evolution of a Criminal – Darius Clark Monroe; Oscar Micheaux: The Czar of Black Hollywood – Bayer Mack; Through a Lens Darkly: Black Photographers and the Emergence of a People – Thomas Allen Harris
Best Independent Short	Best Foreign Film
**#AmeriCan – Nate Parker**; Muted – Rachel Goldberg; The Voodoo – Steven Alexander	**Fishing Without Nets (Kenya) – Cutter Hodierne**; Difret (Ethiopia) – Zeresenay Mehari; The Double! (U.K.) – Richard Ayoade; Freedom Road (South Africa) – Shane Vermooten; Half of a Yellow Sun (Nigeria) – Biyi Bandele
Best Original or Adapted Song	Outstanding Original Score
**"Glory" from Selma – Performed by John Legend and Common**; "It Ain't Easy" from Top Five – Performed by Questlove and Eliza Colby; "It's On Again" from The Amazing Spider-Man 2 – Performed by Alicia Keys and Kendrick Lamar; "Grateful" from Beyond the Lights – Performed by Rita Ora; "What is Love" from Rio 2 – Performed by Janelle Monáe	**Jason Moran – Selma**; Terence Blanchard – Black or White; Kathryn Bostic – Dear White People; Danny Bramson and Waddy Wachtel – Jimi: All Is by My Side; Mark Isham – Beyond the Lights
Best Television Miniseries or Movie	Outstanding Director in a Television Miniseries or Movie
**The Trip to Bountiful (Lifetime) – Bill Haber and Jeff Hayes**; A Day Late and a Dollar Short (Lifetime) – Jeffrey M. Hayes; Gun Hill (BET) – Reggie Rock Bythewood; Rosemary's Baby (NBC) – Zoe Saldaña, Tom Patricia and Robert Bernacchi; Seasons of Love (Lifetime) – Joshua A. Green and Yaron Schwartzman	**Reggie Rock Bythewood – Gun Hill (BET)**; Sharon Brathwaite-Sanders and Peres Owino – Seasons of Love (Lifetime); Shernold Edwards – A Day Late and a Dollar Short (Lifetime); Dayna Lynne North – An En Vogue Christmas (Lifetime); Kimberly Walker – Comeback Dad (UP)
Best Actor in a TV Movie or Limited Series	Best Actress in a TV Movie or Limited Series
**Larenz Tate – Gun Hill (BET)**; Charles S. Dutton – Comeback Dad (UP); David Alan Grier – An En Vogue Christmas (Lifetime); Ving Rhames – A Day Late and a Dollar Short (Lifetime); Keith Robinson – Lyfe's Journey (UP)	**Cicely Tyson – The Trip to Bountiful (Lifetime)**; Whoopi Goldberg – A Day Late and a Dollar Short (Lifetime); Imani Hakim – The Gabby Douglas Story (Lifetime); LeToya Luckett – Seasons of Love (Lifetime); Zoe Saldaña – Rosemary's Baby (NBC)
Best Supporting Actor in a TV Movie or Limited Series	Best Supporting Actress in a TV Movie or Limited Series
**Blair Underwood – The Trip to Bountiful (Lifetime)**; Richard T. Jones – Lyfe's Journey (UP); Harry Lennix – The Fright Night Files (TVOne); Mekhi Phifer – A Day Late and a Dollar Short (Lifetime); Bokeem Woodbine – The Fright Night Files (TVOne)	**Anika Noni Rose – A Day Late and a Dollar Short (Lifetime)**; Tichina Arnold – A Day Late and a Dollar Short (Lifetime); Kimberly Elise – A Day Late and a Dollar Short (Lifetime); Aisha Hinds – Gun Hill (BET); Vanessa L. Williams – The Trip to Bountiful (Lifetime)
Outstanding Screenplay in a TV Movie or Limited Series	Best Television Documentary or Special
**Reggie Rock Bythewood – Gun Hill (BET)**; Stan Foster – My Other Mother (UP); Princess Monique – Seasons of Love (Lifetime); Russ Parr and R.L. Scott – The Fright Night Files (TVOne); Ryan Richmond – Lyfe's Journey (UP)	**Mr. Dynamite: The Rise of James Brown (HBO) – Alex Gibney**; Finding the Funk (VH1) – Nelson George; On the Run Tour: Beyoncé and Jay-Z (HBO) – Jonas Åkerlund; The Tanning of America: One Nation Under Hip-Hop (VH1) – Billy Corben; Terror at the Mall (HBO) – Dan Reed
