= Tami Reiker =

American cinematographer

Tami Reiker is an American cinematographer.

== Biography ==
She studied in Tisch School of the Arts, where she decided to become a cinematographer.

For her work on the Carnivàle's pilot, she became the first woman to run for an American Society of Cinematographers Award, and the first to win as well.

In 2005, she was invited to become a member of the Academy of Motion Picture Arts and Sciences.

== Filmography ==
=== Film ===
Direct-to-video

Year	Title	Director	Notes
1990	Lifestyles of the Ramones	George Seminara	With Vincent Giordano, Samuel M. Henriques, and Benjamin P. Speth
2015	Second Thoughts	David Shane	

Short film

Year	Title	Director
1992	A Woman's Point of View During Sex	Ingrid Rudefors
1994	Meats & Jesus	Robert Chemtob
1994	Urban Legend	Adrienne Shelly
1995	Little Women in Transit	Barbara Heller
2012	The Bronzer	Peyton Wilson

Feature film

Year	Title	Director	Notes
1995	The Incredibly True Adventure of Two Girls in Love	Maria Maggenti	With Jennifer Cox
1996	Far Harbor	John Huddles	
1998	High Art	Lisa Cholodenko	
1998	Girl	Jonathan Kahn	
1999	The Love Letter	Peter Chan	
2003	Pieces of April	Peter Hedges	
2007	Mr. Woodcock	Craig Gillespie	
2014	Beyond the Lights	Gina Prince-Bythewood	
2020	The Old Guard	Gina Prince-Bythewood	With Barry Ackroyd
2020	One Night in Miami	Regina King	
2026	Rain Reign	Erika Burke Rossa	

=== Television ===
TV movies

Year	Title	Director	Notes
1995	Alchemy	Suzanne Myers	
2000	Disappearing Acts	Gina Prince-Bythewood	
2007	Mitch Albom's For One More Day	Lloyd Kramer	
2011	Five	Demi Moore	Segment "Charlotte"
2013	Blink		

TV series

Year	Title	Director	Notes
2003	Carnivàle	Rodrigo García	Episode "Milfay"
2010	30 for 30	Lisa Lax; Nancy Stern	Segment Unmatched; With Christian Hoagland
2013	Getting On	Miguel Arteta	Episode "Born on the Fourth of July"
2017	Shots Fired	Gina Prince-Bythewood; Millicent Shelton	Episodes "Hour One: Pilot" and "Hour Two: Betrayal of Trust"
2018	Cloak & Dagger	Gina Prince-Bythewood	Episode "First Light"
2018	Charmed	Brad Silberling	Episode "Pilot"
2022	Women of the Movement	Gina Prince-Bythewood	Episode "Mother and Son"
2022	Surface	Sam Miller	Episodes "Ictus" and "Muscle Memory"
2023	The Morning Show	Thomas Carter; Stacie Passon; Jennifer Getzinger	4 episodes

== Accolades ==
Year	Award	Category	Title	Result
1998	Independent Spirit Award	Best Cinematography	High Art	Nominated
2004	American Society of Cinematographers	Outstanding Achievement in Cinematography	Carnivàle	Won
2005	Women in Film Crystal Awards	Vision Award		Won
2021	Satellite Awards	Best Cinematography	One Night in Miami	Nominated
