= Camara Kambon =

American film composer and songwriter (born 1973)

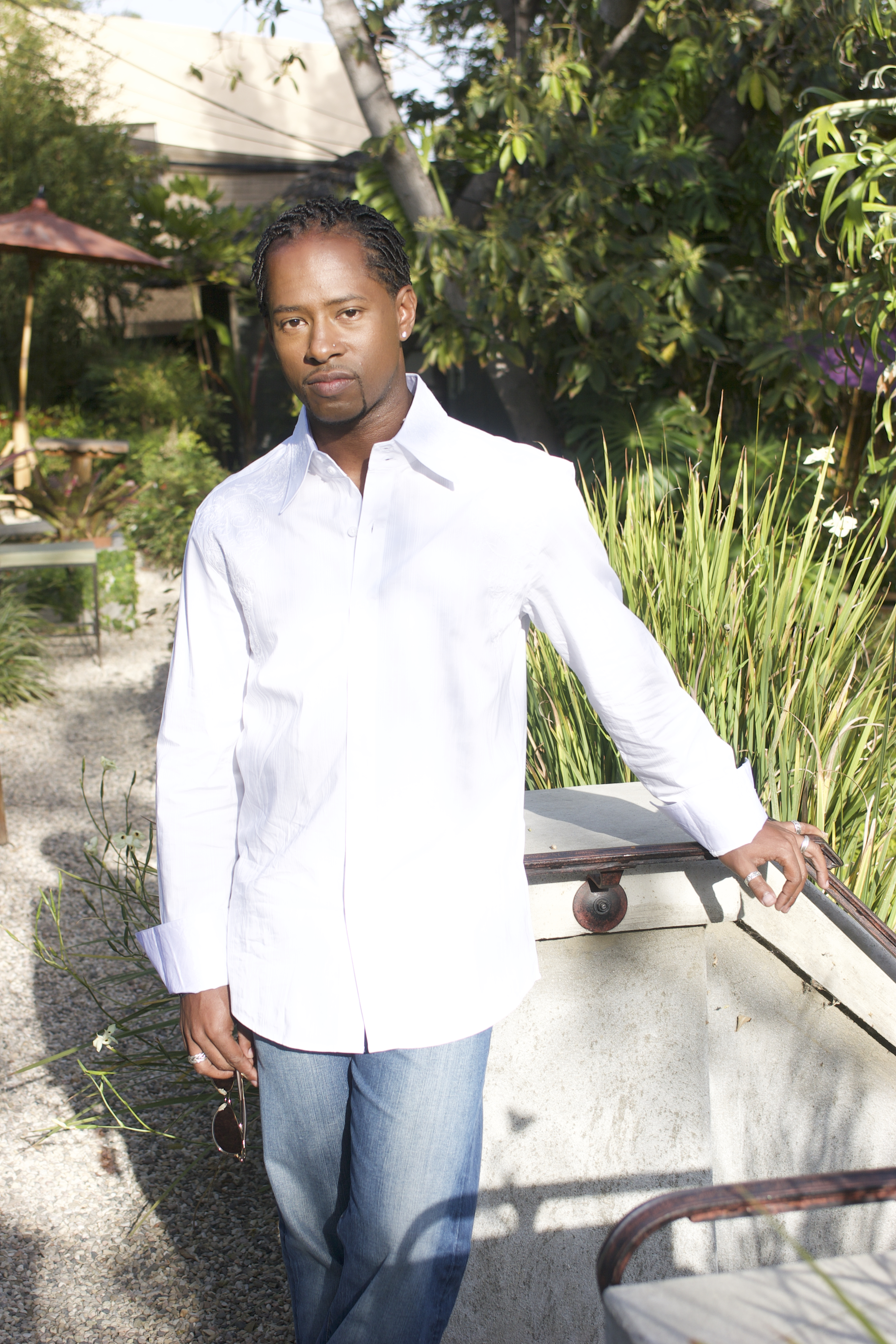
- Born: February 4, 1973 (age 53); Baltimore, Maryland, U.S.
- Education: Berklee College of Music; Atlantic University
- Occupations: Film composer, musician, songwriter, music producer, educator
- Years active: 1991–present
- Website: camarakambon.com

Camara Kambon (born February 4, 1973) is an American film composer, songwriter, pianist, music producer and educator. He is known for collaborating with Dr. Dre on Chronic 2001, as well as Eminem on The Slim Shady LP and The Marshall Mathers LP. He co-wrote the Mary J. Blige song Family Affair, composed the theme for the Mara Brock Akil produced CW sitcom, Girlfriends, and the score for the DreamWorks' feature film, Biker Boyz. Kambon has received an Emmy Award, two Emmy nominations, three Grammy nominations, a BMI Pop Award and a BMI Film/TV Award.

== Early life and career ==
Camara Kambon grew up in Baltimore, Maryland and began piano studies at an early age. At 10, Kambon received the Jacques Kahn scholarship to attend the Peabody Preparatory School of the Johns Hopkins University, to study jazz, classical piano, and musicianship. Later at 14, he performed with jazz trumpeter Dizzy Gillespie at Blues Alley in Washington, D.C. In the same year, he met Bill Cosby collaborator, Stu Gardner, which led to an interest in composing for TV and film.

In the fall of 1991, Kambon received a Jesse Stone scholarship to attend the Berklee College of Music in Boston, where he majored in film scoring and music production & engineering. In 1993, he composed the scores for Dancing: New Worlds, New Forms and Malcolm X: Make it Plain. In 1995, Kambon premiered his commissioned piece, Korikabaya, with the Baltimore Symphony Orchestra.

After graduating from Berklee in 1995, Kambon moved to Los Angeles to pursue a career as a composer. In the following year, he became the youngest composer to win a national Emmy award for scoring the HBO film, Sonny Liston: The Mysterious Life and Death of a Champion. In the same year, Kambon was hired to work with rapper and record producer Dr. Dre as his keyboardist, music director and orchestrator in residence for all recordings of his company, Aftermath Entertainment. He contributed to songs including Dr. Dre's Still D.R.E, Forgot About Dre, Xxxplosive, and The Next Episode, Eminem’s My Name Is and Guilty Conscious; Snoop Dogg’s B**** Please. In addition, he co-wrote Mary J. Blige’s Family Affair, which became the singer’s first song to top the Billboard Hot 100.

Kambon has worked with several directors and producers, including Oliver Stone, Tyler Perry, Mara Brock Akil, F. Gary Gray, John Singleton, Reggie Rock Bythewood, Rick Famuyima, LeVar Burton, Orlando Bagwell, and Macky Alston. Kambon holds a master's degree in transpersonal psychology from Atlantic University. In addition, he educates young composers and songwriters while performing as a jazz pianist.

== Filmography ==
=== Film ===
- Family Name (1997)
- The Wood (1999)
- Any Given Sunday (1999)
- Michael Jordan to the Max (2000)
- Dancing in September (2001)
- Questioning Faith: Confessions of a Seminarian (2002)
- Biker Boyz (2003)
- Diary of a Mad Black Woman (2005)
- Madea’s Family Reunion (2006)
- Daddy’s Little Girls (2007)
- Hard Road Home (2008)
- La Corona (2008)
- John Lewis: Get in the Way (2015)
- Thor: Love and Thunder (2022)
- Acts of Reparation (2024)

=== Television ===
- Dancing: New Worlds New Forms (1993)
- Malcolm X: Make it Plain (1994)
- Frederick Douglass: When the Lion Wrote History (1994)
- Sonny Liston: The Mysterious Life and Death of a Champion (1995)
- Where Have You Gone, Joe DiMaggio? (1997)
- The Tiger Woods Story (1998)
- Damon (1998)
- Girlfriends (2000)
- 2gether: The Series (2000)
- OJ: A Study in Black and White (2002)
- A City on Fire: The Story of the ’68 Detroit Tigers (2002)
- Matters of Race (2003)
- This Far by Faith (2003)
- Citizen King (2004)
- Daddy’s Girl (2007)
- One Night in Vegas (2010)
- Now En Español (2015)
- Seau (2018)
- The First Lady (2022)

== Awards and nominations ==
- In 1995, Kambon won a Sports Emmy Award for scoring the HBO film Sonny Liston: The Mysterious Life and Death of a Champion.
- In 1997, Kambon received an Emmy nomination for scoring the HBO documentary, Where Have You Gone, Joe DiMaggio?.
- In 1997, Kambon won a BMI Film/TV Award for scoring Sonny Liston: The Mysterious Life and Death of a Champion.
- In 2001, Kambon received a Grammy nomination for co-writing Mary J. Blige’s song Family Affair.
- In 2001, Kambon received a Grammy nomination for his keyboard work on Nelly Furtado’s album Whoa, Nelly!.
- In 2002, Kambon received a Grammy nomination for his keyboard work on Eve’s album Scorpion.
- In 2002, Kambon received an Emmy nomination for scoring the HBO documentary A City on Fire: The Story of the ’68 Detroit Tigers.
- In 2003, Kambon won a BMI Pop Award for co-writing Mary J. Blige’s song Family Affair.
