= Dancing in September =

2000 film by Reggie Rock Bythewood

- Written by: Reggie Rock Bythewood
- Directed by: Reggie Rock Bythewood
- Starring: Nicole Ari Parker; Isaiah Washington
- Composer: Camara Kambon
- Country of origin: United States
- Original language: English

Production
- Producers: Reuben Cannon; Don Kurt; Reggie Rock Bythewood
- Cinematography: Bill Dill
- Editors: Kevin Krasny; Joel Plotch
- Running time: 106 minutes
- Production companies: HBO Films; Weecan Films; StarRise Entertainment

Original release
- Network: HBO
- Release: February 3, 2001

Dancing in September is an American romantic comedy-drama television film written and directed by Reggie Rock Bythewood. It stars Nicole Ari Parker and Isaiah Washington, alongside Vicellous Reon Shannon, Malinda Williams, Jay Underwood, Michael Cavanaugh, Mel Jackson, and Jenifer Lewis. It follows a struggling African-American television writer who gets her sitcom picked up by the neophyte WPX network through an executive producer hired specifically to develop shows aimed at the black market.

The film premiered at the Hollywood Black Film Festival on February 24, 2000, and also screened at the Sundance Film Festival on January 24, 2001. It aired on HBO on February 3, 2001, and earned a Primetime Emmy Award nomination for the song "Welcome Back (All My Soulmates)". It was also nominated for two NAACP Image Awards and five Black Reel Awards, with Bythewood winning Outstanding Director and Outstanding Screenplay, TV Movie or Mini-Series.

== Plot ==
Dancing In September tells the story of two hopeful and ambitious African-Americans attempting to make their mark in the television industry. One is a scriptwriter named Tomasina “Tommy” Crawford (Parker), who has grown weary of contributing to stereotypical characters and programming for African-Americans and dreams of creating a balanced, positive program for herself and the African-American public. The other is a newly appointed television producer named George Washington (Washington), who hopes to ascend to the highest levels of the television industry and carve out a special place for himself to help redefine African-American programming. When Tommy submits a script for a positive family sitcom titled "Just Us," she is indirectly brought into George's path. The rest of the film follows the struggles that both she and George face in their specific environments, mainly painting a positive portrayal of African-Americans in the media, in addition to staying true to their own culture and identity as African-Americans.

== Cast ==
- Nicole Ari Parker as Tomasina "Tommy" Crawford
- Isaiah Washington as George Washington
- Vicellous Reon Shannon as James
- Malinda Williams as Rhonda
- Jay Underwood as Michael Daniels
- Michael Cavanaugh as Harbor
- Mel Jackson as Malik
- Jenifer Lewis as Judge Warner
- Marcia Cross as Lydia Gleason
- Estelle Harris as Sally
- Juanita Jennings as Ms. Taylor
- Royale Watkins as A.K.
- Chi McBride as Security Guard
- Markus Flanagan as Alvin Nelson
- Dan Martin as Tommy's Father
- Constance Marie as Teresa Lopez
- James Avery as Mr. Warner
- LeVar Burton as Himself
- Anna Maria Horsford as Sitcom Mom
- Peter Onorati as Mel

== Reception ==
=== Critical response ===
Lael Loewenstein of Variety called Dancing in September "a handsomely mounted tale of love and compromise set against the backdrop of network TV" and concluded her review by writing, "Bythewood's ambition is worthy of his talent, and this is an impressive freshman effort. Pic could stand a little trimming, but pacing in general is sharp and up-tempo, much like Bythewood's writing." Todd McCarthy of Variety described the film as "the decorous and conventional version of Bamboozled" and opined that "Bythewood's approach is downright polite by comparison, as he analyzes the commercial pressures on TV creators to be entertaining at all costs while weaving through it a perfectly agreeable but unexceptional love story." Julie Salamon of The New York Times stated, "Mr. Blythewood has a smooth directing style and plenty of show-biz smarts. Maybe too much; he salts this production with lots of insider bits of business […]. Despite this shrewdness, Mr. Blythewood doesn't resist sliding into the genre's twin pitfalls of sentimentality and melodrama. Still, Dancing in September presents a fresh look at familiar territory."

=== Accolades ===
Year	Award	Category	Recipient(s)	Result	Ref.
2001	27th Humanitas Awards	Sundance Feature Film	Dancing in September	Nominated	
2001	53rd Primetime Creative Arts Emmy Awards	Outstanding Music and Lyrics	"Welcome Back (All My Soulmates)"; Mark Sparks, Sy Smith	Nominated	
2002	33rd NAACP Image Awards	Outstanding Television Movie, Mini-Series or Dramatic Special	Dancing in September	Nominated	
2002	33rd NAACP Image Awards	Outstanding Actor in a Television Movie, Mini-Series or Dramatic Special	Isaiah Washington	Nominated	
2002	3rd Black Reel Awards	Outstanding TV Movie or Mini-Series	Dancing in September	Nominated	
2002	3rd Black Reel Awards	Outstanding Director, TV Movie or Mini-Series	Reggie Rock Bythewood	Won	
2002	3rd Black Reel Awards	Outstanding Actress, TV Movie or Mini-Series	Nicole Ari Parker	Nominated	
2002	3rd Black Reel Awards	Outstanding Supporting Actor, TV Movie or Mini-Series	Vicellous Reon Shannon	Nominated	
2002	3rd Black Reel Awards	Outstanding Screenplay, TV Movie or Mini-Series	Reggie Rock Bythewood	Won	
