= Biker Boyz =

- Theatrical release poster
- Directed by: Reggie Rock Bythewood
- Written by: Craig Fernandez; Reggie Rock Bythewood
- Based on: "Biker Boyz" by Michael Gougis
- Produced by: Stephanie Allain; Gina Prince-Bythewood; Erwin Stoff
- Starring: Laurence Fishburne; Derek Luke; Orlando Jones; Djimon Hounsou; Lisa Bonet; Brendan Fehr; Larenz Tate; Kid Rock
- Cinematography: Greg Gardiner
- Edited by: Caroline Ross; Terilyn A. Shropshire
- Music by: Camara Kambon
- Production company: 3 Arts Entertainment
- Distributed by: DreamWorks Pictures
- Release date: January 31, 2003 (United States)
- Running time: 111 minutes
- Country: United States
- Language: English
- Budget: $24 million
- Box office: $23.5 million

Biker Boyz is a 2003 American sports action film, directed by Reggie Rock Bythewood and written by Bythewood and Craig Fernandez, based on the 2000 New Times LA article of the same name by Michael Gougis. The film is about a group of underground motorcycle drag racers, and the intense rivalry between a legendary motorcyclist and a young racing prodigy who has formed his own biker club.

The film features an ensemble cast including Laurence Fishburne, Derek Luke, Meagan Good, Djimon Hounsou, Brendan Fehr, Rick Gonzalez, Larenz Tate, Terrence Howard, Orlando Jones, Salli Richardson, and Kid Rock. It also features Lisa Bonet and Vanessa Bell Calloway.

Biker Boyz was released on January 31, 2003, in the United States by DreamWorks Pictures, and was a critical and commercial failure.

== Plot ==
The undefeated champion of underground motorcycle drag racing is Smoke, the "King of Cali". A biker, Chu-Chu, eventually issues a challenge to Smoke, who accepts. Smoke wins the race while the challenger crashes into parked bikes. Upended, the motorcycle strikes Smoke's mechanic Slick Will. Both men instantly die. At Slick Will's funeral, Smoke leads bikers from the "Black Knights" to offer his condolences to Slick Will's widow Anita.

Six months later, Slick Will's son Kid, a rider who is hustling with fellow racer Stuntman, attend a biker party. There, Kid and Stuntman hustle fellow racer Donny after Kid disrupted a race between Donny and Stuntman to show off his new bike and impress a woman he met in the crowd, Tina. To cover their tracks, fellow biker Primo suggests that the trio form a bike club. Kid makes amends to the biker jury consisting of ten leaders of the most powerful biker gangs following his stunt. He apologizes for his disrespect towards Smoke, their chairman, and they agree to verify the new club with the trio calling themselves "Biker Boyz".

Smoke is challenged by leader of the Strays and long-time rival Dogg, and the two wager thousands and the title. The day of the race, Smoke defeats Dogg and afterwards, the Biker Boyz arrive. Kid trash talks Motherland to provoke Smoke. Smoke is unamused with Kid's bid to "make an entrance" and the Black Knights exit. Motherland and Kid race until police arrive and arrest Kid. A lawyer for the Black Knights bails Kid out. Anita later confronts him, threatening to kick Kid out if he races again.

The night of the Black Knights annual dance, Kid is challenged by proxy to race Dogg and accepts. Anita finds Smoke before the race and demands that he stop it. Furious, she tells Smoke that Kid is his son and not Slick Will's. Smoke is moved to act and draws Kid into an altercation. Kid attacks Smoke, but gets his keys confiscated and knocked out, averting the race.

Recovering at home, Kid confronts Anita, who confesses. Enraged, Kid moves in with Tina. Kid elects to go rogue and after gaining more followers for his club, gathers his team. When Stuntman hustles the nephew of a dangerous biker, he and Primo are ambushed at a party. Kid comes to the rescue but is overpowered by the leader of the other club who pulls a gun. Smoke and some Black Knights intervene and convince the vengeful bikers to stand down. Smoke and Kid have a sit down at the Biker Boyz spot. Smoke agrees to race Kid under the condition that whoever loses will never race again. However, first Smoke has to allow Kid to race Dogg at the next circuit event. Kid later reconciles with Anita.

At the track, Kid and his team face the Strays with Smoke and the Black Knights at watch. Dogg and Kid race until the former causes the latter to crash. Although Kid is unhurt, his bike is wrecked. The authorities are closing the track, due to the amount of crashes, but Smoke has rented a farm outside of town, securing his race with Kid. Kid agrees to arrive the next day.

Kid, Primo, and Stuntman try to fix Kid's bike when the Strays arrive to confront them. However, the damage is too severe to mend in time for the race. Dogg concedes that only their bikes are as strong and fast as Smoke's. As a peace offering, Dogg lends Kid his bike.

The following day, Black Knights and Biker Boyz arrive in the open field. Smoke calls for a fair race, without nitrous; Kid wants Tina to call the start. Smoke and Kid race on a dirt road behind the farm. However, Smoke eventually slows down to let his son win, giving way to Kid becoming the new "King of Cali".

Smoke relinquishes the crown to a humbled and respectful Kid who tells him to keep his helmet. Kid watches on as Smoke rides off into the sunset.

== Cast ==
- Laurence Fishburne as Manuel "Smoke" Galloway
- Derek Luke as Jaleel "Kid" Galloway, Anita's son, Tina's boyfriend and Smoke's estranged son
- Orlando Jones as "Soul Train" Smoke's best friend and lawyer/advisor to the Black Knights.
- Djimon Hounsou as "Motherland"
- Lisa Bonet as "Queenie"
- Brendan Fehr as "Stuntman"
- Larenz Tate as "Wood"
- Terrence Dashon Howard as "Chu-Chu"
- Kid Rock as "Dogg"
- Rick Gonzalez as "Primo"
- Meagan Good as Tina, Kid's Girlfriend
- Salli Richardson-Whitfield as "Half & Half", the second in command of the Black Knights.
- Vanessa Bell Calloway as Anita Galloway, Kid's Mother and Slick Will's Wife
- Dante Basco as "Philly"
- Kadeem Hardison as T.J.
- Dion Basco as "Flip"
- Tyson Beckford as Donny
- Eriq La Salle as Tariq "Slick Will" Galloway, Kid's Stepfather
- Nicholas Sheriff as "Kidd Chaos"

== Featured motorcycles ==
- Silver and Magenta 1999 Suzuki Hayabusa GSX1300R: Smoke
- Yellow and silver 2001 Suzuki GSX-R 750: Kid
- Black 2000 Kawasaki Ninja ZX-12R: Dogg
- Red and silver Ducati 996S: Primo
- Silver 2000 Yamaha R1: Kidd Chaos
- Orange 1998 Yamaha R1: Chu Chu
- Silver 2000 Yamaha R1: Stuntman
- Green 1999 Suzuki TL1000R: 1/2 & 1/2
- 1982 Kawasaki KZ1000: Soul Train
- 2001 Honda CBR1100XX: Motherland
- T-Rex (automobile): T.J.

== Development ==
Biker Boyz is based loosely on Manuel "Pokey" Galloway the president of Valiant Riders of Pasadena, California.

The main cast members were all bikers in real life.

The real "King Of Cali" made a cameo appearance in the film, in the scene where Kid is in a meeting with the set.

Slick Will really does not blink as the bike hits him, as Soul Train states.

Actual motorcycle clubs were on the set as technical advisors, and performed some of the tricks, stunts, and racing. They include Valiant Riders, The Mighty Black Sabbath Motorcycle Club Nation, G-Zer Tribe, Ruff Ryders, Soul Brothers, Total Package, Chosen Few MC, Rare Breed, Brothers of the Sun, Sisters of the Sun, Deuces, and Black Sabbath New Breed.

The Biker Boyz jackets were in part inspired by Nexxunlimited Entertainment (as shown in the end credits).

== Soundtrack ==
A soundtrack containing hip hop, rock and R&B music was released on January 23, 2003, by DreamWorks Records. It peaked at #98 on the Top R&B/Hip-Hop Albums.

== Reception ==
=== Critical response ===
The movie received generally negative reviews. Rotten Tomatoes gives the film a score of 22% based on reviews from 94 critics. The site's consensus states: "Waste of a good cast. For a movie about bike racing, it never gets up to speed." Metacritic gives the film a score of 36% based on reviews from 27 critics, indicating "generally unfavorable" reviews. Audiences polled by CinemaScore gave the film an average grade of "B+" on an A+ to F scale.

=== Box office ===
Biker Boyz opened in third place behind The Recruit and Final Destination 2, collecting $10.1 million in its debut weekend. The film was a box office failure, earning a worldwide total of $23.5 million against a $24 million budget.

== Home media ==
The film was released on DVD & VHS on June 10, 2003, in North America, and on DVD in the United Kingdom on August 21, 2004.
