= Aisha Hinds =

American actress

- Born: New York, New York, U.S.
- Occupations: Actress; Director
- Years active: 2000–present

Aisha Hinds (born November 13, 1975) is an American television, stage and film actress and director. She had supporting roles in a number of television series, including The Shield, Invasion, True Blood, Detroit 1-8-7 and Under the Dome. In 2016, she played Fannie Lou Hamer in biographical drama film All the Way. She has also appeared in Assault on Precinct 13 (2005) and was cast as Harriet Tubman in WGN America period drama Underground. Beginning in 2018, Hinds stars in the Fox/ABC procedural drama series 9-1-1.

== Life and career ==
Hinds was born in New York, New York. She began her career on television in 2003, on NYPD Blue. In 2004, she had a recurring role on The Shield as Annie Price, and later guest-starred in Crossing Jordan, Boston Legal, It's Always Sunny in Philadelphia, Law & Order: Special Victims Unit, Stargate SG-1, Cold Case, and Desperate Housewives. Hinds was a series regular in the two short-lived ABC series Invasion from 2005 to 2006, and Detroit 1-8-7 (2010–2011). She had recurring roles on Dollhouse, HawthoRNe and True Blood. In film, Hinds appeared in Mr. Brooks, Madea Goes to Jail, Unstoppable, and Star Trek Into Darkness. On stage, she played the leading role of The Best of Enemies at George Street Playhouse in 2011.

In 2013, Hinds appeared on the CW series, Cult, as the evil Rosalind Sakelik. Right after Cult was canceled, Hinds was cast as a series regular on the CBS television series Under the Dome based on Stephen King's book of the same title. She was changed to recurring basis after the first season. In 2014, she had supporting roles in films If I Stay and Beyond the Lights. Also in that year, she had the recurring role of Chief Investigator Ava Wallace on the CBS police procedural, NCIS: Los Angeles. In 2015, Hinds was cast as a regular in the TNT drama pilot, Breed.

In 2016, Hinds received positive reviews for playing civil rights activist Fannie Lou Hamer in the HBO biographical drama film All the Way. Later she was cast in the Fox drama series Shots Fired, and in the WGN America period drama Underground, playing Harriet Tubman.

Since 2018, Hinds stars as firefighter/paramedic Henrietta "Hen" Wilson on TV series 9-1-1 which focuses on Los Angeles first responders including 9-1-1 dispatchers, police officers, and firefighters/paramedics as they deal not only with saving lives but also with struggles in their own lives. In 2025, Hinds made her directorial debut in the eighth season of 9-1-1.

== Filmography ==
=== Film ===
Year	Title	Role	Notes
2000	Miracle in Toyland	Toy Woman (voice)	Video
2004	Love Aquarium	Nina	Short
2005	Assault on Precinct 13	Anna	
2005	Neo Ned	Woman Shopper	
2005	Hate	Paula	TV movie
2006	Blue's Biggest Stories	Joe's Friends	Video
2007	Mr. Brooks	Nancy Hart	
2009	Madea Goes to Jail	Fran	
2009	Lost Dream	Professor Capello	
2009	Prison Break: The Final Break	Guard Cowler	
2009	Within	Dr. Kelly	
2010	Unstoppable	Railway Safety Campaign Coordinator	
2010	The Next Three Days	Detective Collero	
2011	Five	Bernice	TV movie
2013	Star Trek Into Darkness	Navigation Officer Darwin	
2013	And Then...	-	Short
2013	The Arrangement	Rosie	TV movie
2014	Gun Hill	Arlene Carter	TV movie
2014	If I Stay	Nurse Ramirez	
2014	Beyond the Lights	J Stanley	
2015	Runaway Island	Lara Cook-Nordholm	
2015	Breed	Captain Dennison	TV movie
2016	All the Way	Fannie Lou Hamer	TV movie
2016	The Tale of Four	Peaches	Short
2016	#Trending	Renee's Mom (voice)	Short
2019	Godzilla: King of the Monsters	Colonel Diane Foster	
2019	First Day Back	Principal	Short
2023	The Perfect Find	Billie	
2024	The American Society of Magical Negroes	Gabbard	

=== Television ===
Year	Title	Role	Notes
2003	NYPD Blue	Carla Howell	Episode: "Yo, Adrian"
2003	Blue's Clues	Miss Marigold	Recurring cast: season 5
2004	ER	Medical Board Testing Administrator	Episode: "Abby Normal"
2004	The Shield	Annie Price	Recurring cast: season 3
2004	Crossing Jordan	Asmina Chol	Episode: "Out of Sight"
2004	Boston Legal	Beah Toomy	Episode: "Head Cases"
2005	Medium	Maxine Harris	Episode: "Suspicions and Certainties"
2005	CSI: NY	Brett Stokes	Episode: "Recycling"
2005	Judging Amy	Lena Reynolds	Episode: "The Paper War"
2005–2006	Invasion	Mona Gomez	Recurring cast
2006, 2016	It's Always Sunny in Philadelphia	Welfare Case Worker	2 episodes: "Dennis and Dee Go on Welfare", "Frank Falls Out the Window"
2006	Standoff	Anne	Episode: "Life Support"
2006	Lost	Nigerian Nun	Episode: "The Cost of Living"
2007	Stargate SG-1	Thilana	Episode: "Line in the Sand"
2007	Lincoln Heights	Agent Murietta	Episode: "Out with a Bang"
2007	Women's Murder Club	Melanie Topor	Episode: "Maybe Baby"
2007	Cold Case	Lorraine Henderson	Episode: "It Takes a Village"
2007	Conspiracy	-	Episode: "Pilot"
2008	Bones	Officer Norma Randall	Episode: "The Bone That Blew"
2008–2010	True Blood	Miss Jeanette	Recurring cast: season 1–2, guest: season 3
2009	Law & Order: Special Victims Unit	Jackie Blaine/Harold Franklin	Episode: "Transitions"
2009	Dollhouse	Agent Loomis	Recurring cast: Season 1
2009	Prison Break	Guard Cowler	Episode: "Free" & "The Old Ball and Chain"
2009	Desperate Housewives	Motel Maid	Episode: "Everybody Ought to Have a Maid"
2009–2010	Hawthorne	Isabel Walsh	Recurring cast: season 1-2
2010	Weeds	Latrice	Recurring cast: Season 6
2010–2011	Detroit 1-8-7	Lieutenant Maureen Mason	Main cast
2011	CSI: Miami	Dr. Rachel Porter	Episode: "Crowned"
2013	Cult	Det. Rosalyn Sakelik	Recurring cast
2013–2015	Under the Dome	Carolyn Hill	Recurring cast
2014	Killer Women	FBI Agent Linda Clark	Episode: "Warrior"
2014	NCIS: Los Angeles	Chief Investigator Ava Wallace	Recurring cast: season 6
2015	G Code	Deidra Gooding	Episode: "Pilot"
2015	Wet Hot American Summer: First Day of Camp	Amelia	Episode: "Auditions"
2017	Underground	Harriet Tubman	Recurring cast: season 2
2017	Shots Fired	Pastor Janae James	Main cast
2018	Unsolved	Voletta Wallace	Recurring cast
2018–present	9-1-1	Henrietta "Hen" Wilson	Main role
2021	9-1-1: Lone Star	Henrietta "Hen" Wilson	Episode: "Hold the Line"
2024	Celebrity Family Feud	Herself	Contestant; Episode: "Fantasy Sweets vs Golden Five and 9-1-1 vs Jury Duty"

=== As a director ===
Year	Title	Notes
2025–2026	9-1-1	Episodes: "Holy Mother of God" and "Going Once, Going Twice"

== Awards and nominations ==
Year	Awards	Category	Recipient	Outcome
2015	Black Reel Awards	Black Reel Award for Best Supporting Actress: Television Movie/Cable	"Gun Hill"	Nominated
2023	Black Reel Awards	Outstanding Supporting Performance, Drama Series	9-1-1	Nominated
2026	NAACP Image Awards	Outstanding Supporting Actress in a Drama Series	9-1-1	Won
