= Beah: A Black Woman Speaks =

- Directed by: LisaGay Hamilton
- Produced by: Neda Armian; Jonathan Demme; LisaGay Hamilton; Joe Viola
- Cinematography: Sovonto Green
- Edited by: Kate Amend
- Music by: Geri Allen; Bernice Johnson Reagon
- Distributed by: Women Make Movies, HBO
- Release dates: August 22, 2003 (U.S.); March 3, 2006 (UK)
- Country: United States
- Language: English

Beah: A Black Woman Speaks is a 2003 documentary about the life of Academy Award nominated actress Beah Richards. Directed by LisaGay Hamilton, it won the Documentary Award at the AFI Los Angeles International Film Festival in 2003, and a Peabody Award in 2004.

== People featured ==
- Beah Richards (archive footage)
- Bill Cobbs
- Ossie Davis
- Ruby Dee
- Lynn Hamilton
- Hugh Harrell Jr.
- Whitman Mayo
- Ruby Milsap
- Frank Silvera
- Spencer Tracy (archive footage)

== Awards ==
The film won the 2003 documentary award at AFI Fest and the 2005 Peabody Award. In 2004 it was nominated for three Black Reel Awards and an Image Award.
