= A Huey P. Newton Story =

2001 film by Spike Lee

- Television release poster
- Genre: Drama
- Based on: A Huey P. Newton Story by Roger Guenveur Smith
- Written by: Roger Guenveur Smith
- Directed by: Spike Lee
- Starring: Roger Guenveur Smith
- Music by: Marc Anthony Thompson
- Country of origin: United States
- Original language: English

Production
- Producers: Steven Adams; Bob L. Johnson; Marc Henry Johnson
- Cinematography: Ellen Kuras
- Editor: Barry Alexander Brown
- Running time: 86 minutes
- Production companies: Luna Ray Films; 40 Acres and a Mule Filmworks

Original release
- Network: Black Starz!
- Release: June 18, 2001

A Huey P. Newton Story is a 2001 American drama television film directed by Spike Lee. It was created, written and performed, as a solo performance, by Roger Guenveur Smith at The Joseph Papp Public Theater. In this performance, Smith creates a representation of the activist Huey P. Newton's life and time as a person, a citizen and an activist. During the performance, images are shown up-stage from activist movement era. The simple arrangement of Smith sitting in a chair stage-center makes the audience focus on the dialogue of the performer. Smith captures the attention of the audience throughout the film by putting into play his solo performance skills. Smith's idea for the performance originated in 1989 and took root as a stage play in 1996. Smith's performance attempted to show a shy individual that Huey P. Newton believed himself to be. He did not consider himself a charismatic person, although he had made many contributions to his community. Smith shows Newton as a conservative individual who is disgusted by having microphones and cameras close to him.

The film aired on Black Starz! on June 18, 2001.

== Nominations and awards ==
The story that brought Huey P. Newton to life in a single-person performance, and gave the opportunity to people to experience a little bit about his personality, was nominated and winner of various awards (see below), including two Drama Desk nominations: Helen Hayes Awards, Obie Awards, AUDELCO awards and three NAACP Awards. In addition, the movie received two NAACP Image Award nominations for being an Outstanding Television Movie. This award was honored around the world also for Mini-Series and Outstanding Actor in a Television Movie.

=== Film ===
Award	Awardee	Notes
Jamerican Film Festival (2001)	Marcus Garvey Awards for Audience	
Jamerican Film Festival (2001)	Marcus Garvey Awards for Critics' Favorite	
Jamerican Film Festival (2001)	Marcus Garvey Awards for Best Actor	
Slam Dunk Festival (2002)	Best Actor	
NAACP Image Awards	Outstanding Television Movie, Mini-Series, or Dramatic Special	Nominated
NAACP Image Awards	Outstanding Actor in a Motion Picture	
Peabody Award	Area of Excellence	

=== The play ===
Award	Awardee	Notes
Obie Awards (1997)	Roger Guenveur Smith	
Obie Awards (1997)	Marc Anthony Thompson	
Audelco Awards (1997)	Roger Guenveur Smith	
Audelco Awards (1997)	Marc Anthony Thompson	
The Helen Hayes Award, Washington, D.C. (1996)	Roger Guenveur Smith	
The Barrymore Award, Philadelphia (1999)	Roger Guenveur Smith	
The Ira Aldridge Award, Chicago (2000)	Marc Anthony Thompson	
NAACP Theater Awards, Los Angeles (1995)	Best Playwright	
NAACP Theater Awards, Los Angeles (1995)	Best Actor	
NAACP Theater Awards, Los Angeles (1995)	Production of the Year	
LA Weekly Theater Award (1995)	Solo Performance of the Year	
Ovation Awards, Los Angeles (2001)	Marc Anthony Thompson	
Ovation Awards, Los Angeles (2001)	Production of the year	

== Huey P. Newton ==
The film is based for the most part on Huey P. Newton's life. Newton grew up in Oakland after his family moved there from Louisiana due to the military opportunities during World War II. Co-founder of the Black Panther Party, Newton served as Minister of Defense, and in effect was the BPP's leader, writing the Party's 10-Point Platform and Program alongside co-founder Bobby Seale. Convicted of voluntary manslaughter of a police officer in September 1968, Newton spent the next twenty months in prison before being released after his conviction was quashed on a technicality. The BPP had transformed itself in this period, and Newton struggled to cope with the demands placed on him, a situation that was not helped by his increasing consumption of drugs and alcohol. During the 1970s Newton studied at the University of California Santa Cruz, where he obtained a PhD in the History of Consciousness program. On August 22, 1989, Newton was shot and killed in Oakland.

== Production ==
The producers of the film created a project that went on to win various awards for their work. Both Smith and Lee brought to life the story of the activist and presented it on PBS. This movie is a production of BLACK STARZ! and Luna Ray Films in collaboration with PBS and the African Heritage Network. Smith's performance is composed on a simple dark stage with a couple of screens in the back. The production incorporated a couple of cameras to capture different angles as well as different microphones so that scenes could be taken from various perspectives. The production that brought A Huey P. Newton Story presented the movie in San Francisco by KQED. The funding for the movie was possible thanks to BLACK STARZ!, PBS, The National Black Programming Consortium, The African Heritage Network (Frank Mercado Valdes), and the KQED Campaign for the Future.
