= Gina Prince-Bythewood =

American filmmaker (born 1969)

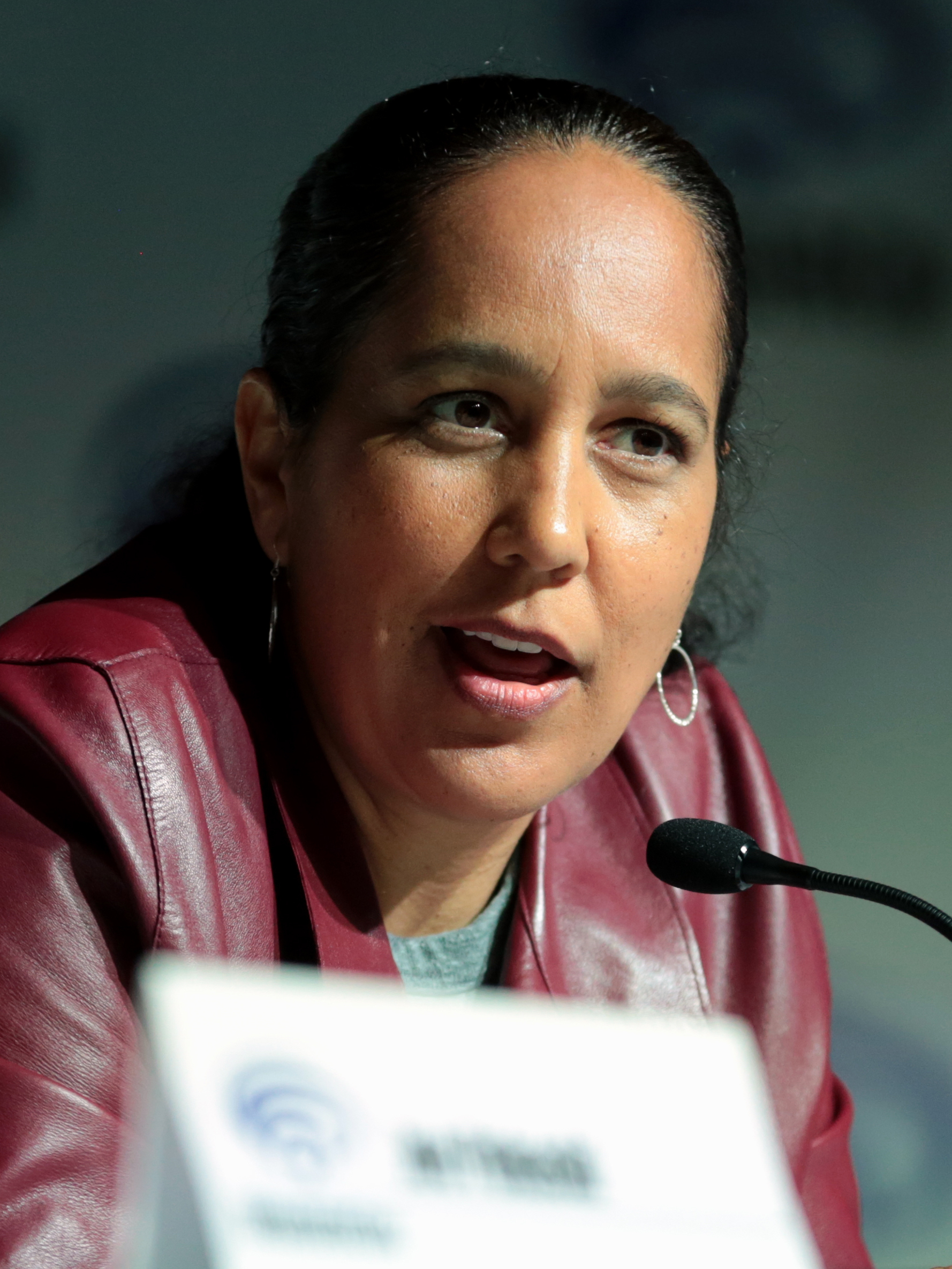
- Prince-Bythewood in 2018
- Born: Gina Maria Prince; June 10, 1969 (age 57); Chicago, Illinois, U.S.
- Education: UCLA
- Occupations: Director; screenwriter
- Known for: Love & Basketball; The Secret Life of Bees; Beyond the Lights; The Woman King
- Spouse: Reggie Rock Bythewood (m. 1998)
- Children: 2 including son Cassius Bythewood

Gina Maria Prince-Bythewood (born June 10, 1969) is an American film director and screenwriter. She began her career as a writer for multiple television shows in the 1990s, including the anthology series CBS Schoolbreak Special, for which she was nominated for two Daytime Emmy Awards. Prince-Bythewood made her feature film directorial debut with Love & Basketball (2000), for which she received an Independent Spirit Award.

Her other works include Disappearing Acts (2000), The Secret Life of Bees (2008), and Beyond the Lights (2014). She became the first black woman to direct a major comic-book film, The Old Guard (2020). Prince-Bythewood earned nominations for Best Director at the Critics' Choice Movie Awards and the British Academy Film Awards for The Woman King (2022).

== Early life ==
Prince-Bythewood was born in Chicago, Illinois, and adopted by Bob Prince, a computer programmer, and Maria Prince, a nurse, when she was 3 weeks old. Her adoptive father is white and her adoptive mother is of Salvadoran and German descent. She grew up in the middle-class neighborhood of Pacific Grove, California. She has four siblings through her adoptive family.

In 1987, Prince-Bythewood graduated from Pacific Grove High School. She attended UCLA's film school, where she also ran track competitively. At UCLA, she received the Gene Reynolds Scholarship for Directing and the Ray Stark Memorial Scholarship for Outstanding Undergraduates. She graduated in 1991.

She sought out her birth mother around 2014, but it was "not a positive experience". Her birth mother, who is white, was a teenager when she gave her up for adoption, because her family knew her child would be multiracial and they wanted her to have an abortion.

== Career ==
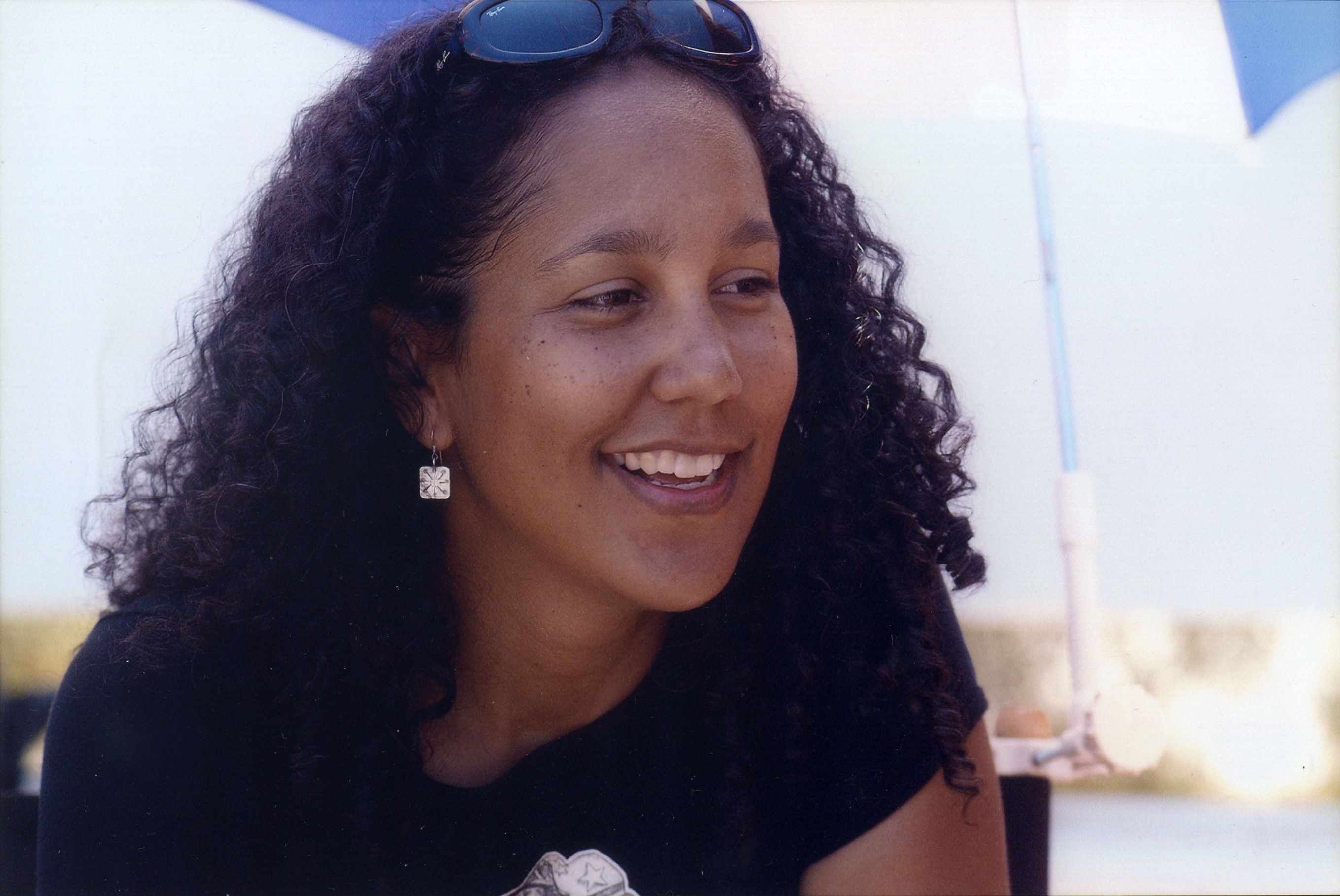
Prince-Bythewood

After five years working in TV as a writer on shows like A Different World and South Central, Prince-Bythewood wrote her first film, 2000's Love & Basketball. The film was based on Prince-Bythewood's personal life and her experiences growing up. It was developed at the Sundance Institute's directing and writing lab. It won 12 awards and was nominated for three more. It won Best Film and Best Film Poster at the Black Reel Awards, and Best First Screenplay at the Independent Spirit Awards. The film also grossed $27.7 million worldwide, making it the ninth most popular basketball film in the United States at that time.

She directed the feature film The Secret Life of Bees, adapted from the best-selling book by Sue Monk Kidd. It was released by Fox Searchlight in October 2008, and debuted at the Toronto International Film Festival and Urbanworld Film Festival that same year.

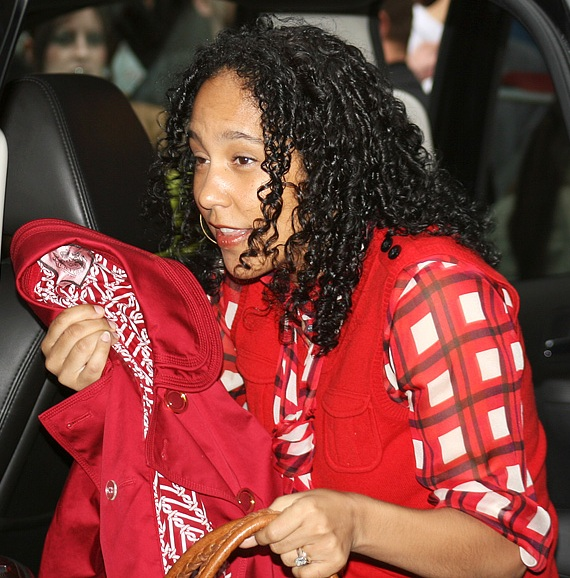
Prince-Bythewood at the 2008 Toronto International Film Festival

In 2014, Prince-Bythewood directed Beyond the Lights, starring Gugu Mbatha-Raw. Prince-Bythewood began work on the film in 2007, before work on 2008's The Secret Life of Bees was completed, but struggled to find financing when the original production company, Sony, backed out after she insisted on casting Mbatha-Raw. The film premiered at the 2014 Toronto International Film Festival.

Beyond the Lights, originally called Blackbird, is based on the Nina Simone song "Blackbird" from the record Nina Simone with Strings. Prince-Bythewood said: "That song really inspired the movie and inspired Noni's story." The main character's story was loosely inspired by the lives of Marilyn Monroe and Judy Garland. Prince-Bythewood also stated that the movie is filled with intense personal issues with some resulting from her own adoption and her fraught encounter with her birth mother. Prince-Bythewood did research with the assistance of a number of singers, including Alicia Keys. The story was also inspired by an experience seeing Keys play the song "Diary". Elements of the film, especially the sexualization of female pop artists, act as a "critique of American media culture." The film was shot in 29 days and cost $7 million. All of the key crew members on the film were women, including costume designer Sandra Hernandez, production designer Cecilia Montiel, cinematographer Tami Reiker, and editor Teri Shropshire. Other collaborators were choreographer Laurieann Gibson (Lady Gaga, Katy Perry, Nicki Minaj), hairstylist Kimberly Kimble (Beyoncé), and record producer The-Dream.

In 2016, Prince-Bythewood announced her next project would be an adaptation of Roxane Gay's novel An Untamed State. The project would be co-written by herself and Gay and would star Gugu Mbatha-Raw.

In 2017, Prince-Bythewood, along with her husband Reggie Rock Bythewood, created the show Shots Fired for Fox. Later that year, Prince-Bythewood was announced as the director for Silver & Black, a film based on Marvel Comics characters Silver Sable and Black Cat.

She wrote the screenplay for the movie adaptation of the novel Before I Fall by Lauren Oliver. The film had an estimated $12,498,674 worldwide box office take by March 2017 after its release date (January 21, 2017). She directed the 2020 film adaptation of Greg Rucka's The Old Guard for Netflix, starring Charlize Theron and KiKi Layne. She is the first mixed race woman to make a comic-book film.

In 2020, she and her husband signed a deal with Touchstone Television to produce their output using the banner "Undisputed Cinema."

Prince-Bythewood directed the TriStar Pictures epic The Woman King, a feature inspired by true events that took place in the Kingdom of Dahomey, one of the most powerful states of Africa in the 18th and 19th centuries. The Woman King tells the story of Nanisca (Viola Davis), general of the all-female military unit known as the Agojie, and her daughter, Nawi, who together fought the Portuguese and neighboring tribes who violated their honor, enslaved their people and threatened to destroy everything they've lived for. She also directed the first episode of ABC's Women of the Movement.

In March 2021, Prince-Bythewood took on a new role as co-chair of the Directors Guild of America African American Steering Committee (AASC). Working alongside Director Jeffrey W. Byrd, Prince-Bythewood will be addressing needs of the African American members of the Guild such as job creation and career advancement in this new position. On August 26, it was announced that because of Prince-Bythewood's commitments to other projects, she would not direct The Old Guard 2 and will be replaced by Victoria Mahoney.

== Personal life ==
In 1998, Prince-Bythewood married film director and writer Reggie Rock Bythewood, whom she met on the writing staff of A Different World. The couple have two sons, Cassius and Toussaint, and live in Southern California.

Along with friends Mara Brock Akil, Sara Finney-Johnson and Felicia D. Henderson, Prince-Bythewood endows The Four Sisters Scholarship.

On September 17, 2026 Prince-Bythewood attend an award ceremony where her son Cassius Blythewood was recognized by the Miami Police Department as a good Samaritan Hero after he saved Caitlin Dydzuhn who was being randomly attacked by a stranger armed with a knife.

== Directorial style ==
Through her films, Prince-Bythewood explores themes that often reflect the experiences of women of color. Specifically, Prince-Bythewood's films frequently challenge popular portrayals of women of color rooted in cultural stereotypes by presenting women as passionate and ambitious figures committed to the realization of their goals. Furthermore, Prince-Bythewood's films work to resist negative conceptions and ideologies about the ability of women to be dynamic; people who are both successful in their professional pursuits and in their maintenance of romantic relationships. Commenting on her film Love & Basketball, Prince-Bythewood spoke to normalizing the idea that women can balance working toward career aspirations and being romantic partners: "Girls are often told you can't have both, so I just wanted to normalize the belief that you can have both. I wanted to normalize girls like Monica, who were girls like me, who grew up playing sports and were… made to feel different". This element of Prince-Bythewood's work - one that challenges expectations in arenas of society that refuse women's (particularly black women's) ability to solidify their own subjectivity through passionate and purposeful vocational pursuits while also being desired romantically - has led some to label her work as romance films, in what some consider an oversimplification and dismissal of underlying womanist narratives and themes.

Additionally, throughout her work, Prince-Bythewood has indicated a particular investment in spotlighting the humanity of the female characters that her films depict. According to Christina N. Baker, Prince-Bythewood forefronts the humanistic quality of her film's characters through the development of narratives that demonstrate the complexities of human emotion. In producing narratives that highlight the intricacies of feeling, thought, and behavior, Prince-Bythewood works to dispel limiting images and representations of women that regard them as objects of desire and self-sacrifice whose purpose is centralized around being in service of others, who are often men, around them. When asked by Kathleen Newman-Bremang why highlighting emotion within her film's female characters is a significant element of her work in a discussion at the 47th Toronto International Film Festival (TIFF) with Viola Davis oriented around the debut of The Woman King (2022), Prince-Bythewood said "It's showing our humanity. People don't see our humanity. So, it's important to put it up on screen".

== Filmography ==
=== Short film ===
Year	Title	Director	Writer	Producer	Notes
1991	Stitches	Yes	Yes	No	As Gina Prince
1997	Progress	Yes	No	No	As Gina Prince
1997	Damn Whitey	Yes	Yes	No	As Gina Prince
1997	Bowl of Pork	Yes	No	No	As Gina Prince
2007	Reflections	Yes	Yes	Yes	Also script development

=== Feature film ===
Year	Title	Director	Writer
2000	Love & Basketball	Yes	Yes
2008	The Secret Life of Bees	Yes	Yes
2014	Beyond the Lights	Yes	Yes
2017	Before I Fall	No	Yes
2020	The Old Guard	Yes	No
2022	The Woman King	Yes	No
2027	Children of Blood and Bone	Yes	Yes

Producer

- Biker Boyz (2003)

=== Television ===
Year	Title	Director	Writer	Producer	Notes
1992–1993	A Different World	No	Yes	No	4 episodes
1994	South Central	No	Yes	No	Episode: "Dog"; Also story editor (7 episodes) and executive story editor (2 episodes)
1994	Sweet Justice	No	Yes	No	
1995	CBS Schoolbreak Special	Yes	Yes	No	Episode "What About Your Friends"
1995	Courthouse	No	Yes	Co-producer	
1998–1999	Felicity	No	Yes	Consulting	Episode: "Friends"
2000	Disappearing Acts	Yes	No	No	Television film
2003	The Bernie Mac Show	Yes	No	No	Episode: "Magic Jordan"
2005	Girlfriends	Yes	No	No	Episodes: "Odds & Ends" and "Fits & Starts"
2005	Everybody Hates Chris	Yes	No	No	Episode: "Everybody Hates the Laundromat"
2007	Daddy's Girl	No	No	Yes	Television documentary
2017	Shots Fired	Yes	Yes	Executive	Also creator; Episode: "Hour One: Pilot" and "Hour Eight: Rock Bottom"
2018	Cloak & Dagger	Yes	No	Executive	Episode: "First Light"
2022	Women of the Movement	Yes	No	Executive	Episode: "Mother and Son"

== Awards and nominations ==
Year	Nominated work	Award	Category	Result	Ref.
1996	CBS Schoolbreak Special	Daytime Emmy Awards	Outstanding Directing For A Children's Series	Nominated	
1996	CBS Schoolbreak Special	Daytime Emmy Awards	Outstanding Writing for a Children's Series	Nominated	
2000	Love & Basketball	Humanitas Prize	Sundance Film Category	Won	
2001	Love & Basketball	Black Reel Awards	Best Director	Won	
2001	Love & Basketball	Black Reel Awards	Best Screenplay, Adapted or Original	Nominated	
2001	Love & Basketball	Independent Spirit Awards	Best First Feature	Nominated	
2001	Love & Basketball	Independent Spirit Awards	Best First Screenplay	Won	
2001	Disappearing Acts	Black Reel Awards	Outstanding Director in a Television Miniseries or Movie	Nominated	
2008	The Secret Life of Bees	Black Reel Awards	Best Director	Won	
2008	The Secret Life of Bees	Black Reel Awards	Best Screenplay, Adapted or Original	Won	
2009	The Secret Life of Bees	Humanitas Prize	Feature Film	Nominated	
2009	The Secret Life of Bees	NAACP Image Awards	Outstanding Directing in a Motion Picture	Won	
2009	The Secret Life of Bees	NAACP Image Awards	Outstanding Writing in a Motion Picture	Nominated	
2015	Beyond the Lights	Black Reel Awards	Best Director	Nominated	
2015	Beyond the Lights	Black Reel Awards	Best Film	Nominated	
2015	Beyond the Lights	NAACP Image Awards	Outstanding Motion Picture	Nominated	
2021	The Old Guard	Hugo Award	Best Dramatic Presentation, Long Form	Won	
2021	The Old Guard	NAACP Image Awards	Outstanding Directing in a Motion Picture	Won	
2023	The Woman King	NAACP Image Awards	Outstanding Directing in a Motion Picture	Won	
2023	The Woman King	British Academy Film Awards	Best Director	Nominated	
2023	The Woman King	Critics' Choice Movie Awards	Best Director	Nominated	
2023	The Woman King	AARP Movies for Grownups Awards	Best Director	Nominated	
2023	The Woman King	African-American Film Critics Association	Best Director	Won	
2023	The Woman King	Alliance of Women Film Journalists	Best Woman Director	Won	
2023	The Woman King	Alliance of Women Film Journalists	Best Director	Nominated	
2023	The Woman King	Black Reel Awards	Outstanding Director	Won	
2023	The Woman King	American Cinema Editors	Filmmaker of the Year	Won	
2023	The Woman King	Gotham Awards	Tribute Award	Won	
2023	The Woman King	Hollywood Critics Association	Best Director	Nominated	
