= Shots Fired (TV series) =

Television series

- Genre: Drama
- Created by: Gina Prince-Bythewood; Reggie Rock Bythewood
- Starring: Sanaa Lathan; Stephan James; Stephen Moyer; Will Patton; Tristan Wilds; Aisha Hinds; DeWanda Wise; Clare-Hope Ashitey; Conor Leslie; Richard Dreyfuss
- Country of origin: United States
- Original language: English
- No. of episodes: 10

Production
- Executive producers: Reggie Rock Bythewood; Francie Calfo; Brian Grazer; Gina Prince-Bythewood
- Producer: Gina Prince-Bythewood
- Cinematography: Rodney Taylor; Tami Reiker
- Running time: 44 minutes
- Production companies: Undisputed Cinema; Imagine Television; 20th Century Fox Television

Original release
- Network: Fox
- Release: March 22 – May 24, 2017

Shots Fired is an American ten-part drama television miniseries that aired on Fox from March 22 to May 24, 2017. The miniseries depicts a DOJ investigation into a racially-charged police shooting of an unarmed teenager, which leads to the DOJ officials uncovering a potential conspiracy involving the death of another teenager.

== Premise ==
Experienced and temperamental investigator Ashe Akino and ambitious, young prosecutor Preston Terry are sent to Gate Station, North Carolina by the DOJ when Jesse Carr, an unarmed Caucasian teenager, is shot during a traffic stop by Joshua Beck, an African-American sheriff's deputy. As they study the shooting, Ashe and Preston learn about the unsolved death of African-American teenager Joey Campbell and begin to unravel a conspiracy.

== Cast ==
=== Main cast ===
- Sanaa Lathan as Ashe Akino, a DOJ investigator and veteran law enforcement officer partnered with Preston
- Stephan James as Preston Terry, a DOJ special prosecutor assigned to investigate Jesse's death with Ashe
- Stephen Moyer as Calvert Breeland, a lieutenant in the Gate Station Sheriff's Office
- Will Patton as Daniel Platt, the sheriff of Gate Station
- Tristan Wilds as Joshua Beck, the Gate Station Sheriff's deputy responsible for shooting Jesse
- Aisha Hinds as Janae James, a pastor of a church in Gate Station.
- DeWanda Wise as Shameeka Campbell, the mother of Joey and Shawn.
- Clare-Hope Ashitey as Kerry Beck, Joshua's wife
- Conor Leslie as Sarah Ellis, the governor's aide to Eamons
- Richard Dreyfuss as Arlen Cox, a real estate developer and campaign donor of Eamons

=== Recurring ===
- Helen Hunt as Patricia Eamons, the governor of North Carolina
- Jill Hennessy as Alicia Carr, Jesse's mother
- Beau Knapp as Caleb Brooks, a Gate Station Sheriff's deputy and friend of Joshua
- Kylen Davis as Shawn Campbell, the younger son of Shameeka Campbell
- Edwina Findley as Shirlane, a local reporter
- Marqus Clae as Cory, a witness to Joey's shooting
- John Beasley as Mr. Dabney, the owner of a local restaurant
- Mike Pniewski as Julian Carroll, Ashe's and Preston's DOJ superior
- Laila Lockhart Kraner as Kai Cano, Ashe's daughter
- Angel Bonanni as Javier Cano, Ashe's former DEA partner and estranged husband
- Jacob Leinbach as Jesse Carr, a North Carolina State University student shot by Joshua
- Brett Cooper as Tess Breeland, Breeland's daughter
- Yohance Myles as Leon Grant, Cory's father
- Markice Moore as Lyndon, a mechanic on parole
- David Shae as the handler, a mysterious individual attempting to cover-up Joey's shooting

=== Guest ===
- Shamier Anderson as Maceo Terry, a running back for the Carolina Panthers and Preston's brother
- Antonique Smith as Kiana, a witness to Joey's shooting
- Lorraine Toussaint as Carole Moore, Kerry's mother
- Kelvin Harrison Jr. as Joey Campbell, the deceased older son of Shameeka Campbell
- Wes McGee as Derkin, a police sergeant formerly with the Gate Station Sheriff's Office
- Britt Rentschler as Pierce, a DOJ attorney assigned to replace Preston
- Javon Johnson as Davies, a DOJ investigator assigned to replace Ashe
- J. Alphonse Nicholson as Junior, Joshua's cousin
- Don A. King as Dr. Koppel, a campaign donor of Eamons
- Vincent J. Hooper as Ivory Boyd, the residential assistant in Joey's residential hall
- Jenna Kanell as Cara, Jesse's girlfriend
- Dennis Haysbert as Mr. Terry, Preston's father

== Production ==
=== Development ===
On December 10, 2015, Fox announced that Shots Fired was picked up to series status. Gina Prince-Bythewood and Reggie Rock Bythewood created the series as a drama that aimed to reflect the racial tensions and police shooting incidents that have spurred demonstrations and outrage across the United States. Gina and Reggie will serve as executive producers along with Francie Calfo and Brian Grazer.

=== Filming ===
In March 2016, crews were filming in Kannapolis, North Carolina. They were expected to continue work in the area through July. Filming took place in Gastonia and Salisbury in April 2016. The Rowan County courthouse became the Gate County Courthouse, and a real WJZY news van appeared in a scene. Other scenes were filmed in Concord, Mooresville and Charlotte. In May, James B. Duke Memorial Library at Johnson C. Smith University played the role of the library at North Carolina State University.

=== Casting ===
It was announced in December 2015 that Sanaa Lathan was cast as Ashe Akino. In February 2016, DeWanda Wise was cast as Shameeka Campbell and Conor Leslie was cast as Sarah Ellis. In March 2016, Stephan James was cast as Preston Terry; Tristan Wilds and Aisha Hinds were cast as Officer Belk (Beck) and Pastor Janae James, respectively; Helen Hunt, Richard Dreyfuss, and Stephen Moyer were cast as Patricia Eamons, Arlen Cox, and Officer Breeland, respectively; Will Patton was cast as Sheriff Daniel Platt; Jill Hennessy was cast as Alicia Carr; and Clare-Hope Ashitey was cast as Kerry Beck.

== Episodes ==
No.	Title	Directed by	Written by	Original release date	Prod. code	Viewers (millions)
1	"Hour One: Pilot"	Gina Prince-Bythewood	Gina Prince-Bythewood & Reggie Rock Bythewood	March 22, 2017	1AZG01	4.70
The DOJ sends Ashe Akino and Preston Terry to Gate Station, North Carolina at the request of Governor Patricia Eamons when Sheriff's Deputy Joshua Beck shoots Jesse Carr during a traffic stop. Joshua claims he pulled Jesse over because he suspected Jesse had drugs on him, with marijuana were apparently found in his car, and shot him because Jesse reached for his gun. The investigation is complicated by racial tensions, which are furthered when a video leaks of Joshua making racially-charged comments about shooting Caucasians. Information provided by Cory leads Ashe and Preston to Shameeka Campbell who lives in an area known as "the houses". The DOJ team learns that Shameeka was intimidated into silence by Sheriff's Lieutenant Calvert Breeland after her son Joey was killed, leading to Ashe suspecting that the sheriff's office is corrupt. Ashe also finds out from Sheriff's Deputy Caleb Brooks that the officers go on "tours" in the houses while Preston is attacked by unknown assailants when he tries visiting Shameeka. During the investigation, Ashe discovers that Javier Cano is seeking sole custody of Kai and Preston begins an affair with Sarah Ellis. After Preston and Ashe speak to Shameeka, Cory is pursued by a mysterious figure.
2	"Hour Two: Betrayal of Trust"	Millicent Shelton	Mick Betancourt	March 29, 2017	1AZG02	3.77
Preston and Ashe attempt to uncover who leaked the video. They learn the video was filmed by Joshua's cousin Junior, who denies selling the footage and says his phone has been in police custody since Caleb arrested him, which leads to the DOJ team discovering that the video has been erased. When cornered by Joshua and Caleb, Junior continues to deny involvement in the video's leak. Sheriff Daniel Platt informs Joshua that he will no longer be represented by the police union. After being questioned by Ashe, Breeland states he intimidated Shameeka to ensure she would protect Shawn. Preston befriends Mr. Dabney and learns of Arlen Cox's plans to develop a private prison at a dinner hosted by Eamons, while also furthering his relationship with Sarah. Ashe's custody battle for Kai grows more dire. As Pastor Janae James calls for more attention to be brought towards the killing of Joey, the DOJ team agrees to investigate the death alongside Jesse's shooting. Shameeka identifies Kiana, who has disappeared, as another witness to her son's death while Preston finds out that Cory has also gone missing. Residents of the houses tell the DOJ team that Janae had her subordinates intimidate Joey for dealing marijuana.
3	"Hour Three: Somebody's Son"	Anthony Hemingway	Denitria Harris-Lawrence	April 5, 2017	1AZG03	3.66
Jesse's toxicology report reveals that he did not have marijuana in his system, but was under the influence of alcohol. By visiting Jesse's college, Preston learns that Jesse was sent to Gate Station by his fraternity as punishment for being beaten by his African-American residential assistant. With Janae urging Eamons to bring more attention to Joey's death, the governor and Sarah meet with Shameeka and are informed that Shawn's middle school is being shut down. Ashe tracks down Kiana, whom she believes is being paid to keep quiet, and unknown to Ashe, is being surveilled by the handler. After a scheduled phone call between Ashe and Kai is delayed, the calls occurs while Ashe is attempting follow Cory's father and ends disastrously when Ashe loses her temper. Nevertheless, by tailing Cory's father, Ashe finds the motel Cory is hiding in.
4	"Hour Four: Truth"	Malcolm D. Lee	Reggie Rock Bythewood	April 12, 2017	1AZG04	3.60
Cory tells the DOJ team that he saw two officers hold Joey down while an older man shot him. While unable to identify the officers, Cory says he remembers the older man's face. For his safety, he is placed in protective custody before the handler is able to kill him. Eamons announces a $3 million educational initiative that will be privately funded by Cox. As part of the initiative, children from Gate Station will be able to attend a more affluent, predominantly-Caucasian school. Ashe and Preston become suspicious of Breeland when they discover that he was the first on the scene when both Joey and Jesse were killed. They also learn that the marijuana found in Jesse's car does not match the strand sold on his campus, but does match the strand found on Joey. With a potential connection between the deaths of Jesse and Joey established, a case on Joey's death is officially opened. Breeland begins his own investigation into Ashe.
5	"Hour Five: Before the Storm"	Kasi Lemmons	Marissa Jo Cerar	April 19, 2017	1AZG05	3.19
Joshua learns from Preston that the marijuana found in Jesse's car matches the strand found on Joey and confronts Breeland, who admits he planted the drugs on Jesse to protect Joshua. Ashe and Preston notice an officer identified as "AD Koppel" in police reports who is not listed as a member of the sheriff's office. From viewing Sarah's computer screen, Preston remembers Koppel as one of Eamons' campaign donors. The DOJ team also takes interest in Sheriff's Sergeant Derkin, who patrolled the houses with Breeland until he transferred out of department shortly after Joey's death. When Ashe meets with Derkin, he reveals that AD stands for auxiliary deputy and Koppel was not the auxiliary deputy present when Joey was killed. Afterwards, Derkin commits suicide. Ashe soon realizes that the "tours" are when Eamons' wealthy donors participate in the officers' patrols around the houses and the DOJ team deduces that Joey was shot by a donor. After they provide Cory with pictures of the auxiliary deputies, Cory identifies Cox as Joey's killer. Ashe informs Preston that she will be temporarily stepping away from the investigation to be present in Washington D.C. for her custody hearing. Breeland prevents Ashe from being arrested during a traffic stop and reveals that he knows about Kai and Ashe's custody battle. Janae, who opposes Eamon using Cox's private prison to fund the education initiative, meets with Cox.
6	"Hour Six: The Fire This Time"	Jonathan Demme	Jeff Stetson	April 26, 2017	1AZG06	3.33
Following Derkin's suicide, the DOJ team concludes that he, Breeland, and Cox were present during Joey's death. Although not listed, Cox admits to Ashe that he was an auxiliary deputy prior to when Joey was killed. Eamons acknowledges to Preston that the tours are a perk offered to her donors and claims to be unaware of any wrongdoing. When summoned before Eamons, Platt denies abuses on the part of the auxiliary deputies, but places Joshua on paid administrative leave following criticism from the governor. Sarah breaks up with Preston over his continued questioning of Eamons and for spying on her computer. The DOJ team witnesses Lyndon tell Breeland that he bought marijuana from Joey and sold it to Jesse, explaining why the strand matches. A riot breaks out in Gate Station where Shawn is arrested for damaging a police car and Breeland prevents a fire hose from being used on the protestors. Preston confronts Cox about Joey's shooting, which Cox denies being involved with. Following the custody hearing in Washington D.C., Ashe learns that she and Preston will be replaced by another DOJ team by next week.
7	"Hour Seven: Content of Their Character"	John David Coles	J. David Shanks	May 3, 2017	1AZG07	3.10
Preston receives evidence from Caleb suggesting that Janae coerced Cory into identifying Cox, but Cory insists that Cox was the shooter. Cox and Janae acknowledge that Cox requested Janae to join his board, which Janae declined, and Cox continues to deny involvement in the shooting. Preston has Shirlane deliver $10,000 to Kiana in exchange for revealing what she witnessed, but the handler overhears the conversation, and Shirlane is struck by a vehicle while driving away from the interview. Unable to find Shirlane's recorder and phone among her belongings, Preston deduces that the collision was not an accident. When Ashe and Preston confront Kiana, they discover a bug in her home and the handler escapes. Hailed as a hero for his actions, Breeland is given a ride with Eamons and when asked by the governor about auxiliary deputy abuses, says he would have reported any to Platt. As Joshua falls into alcoholism and becomes aggressive, Kerry leaves him. Platt has Shawn released from jail, but Shawn later runs away from his home. Ashe finds a hidden video on Jesse's phone of his death, which reveals that Joshua forcibly pulled him from the vehicle. Janae is arrested for Joey's death after the gun used to kill him is discovered in her church.
8	"Hour Eight: Rock Bottom"	Gina Prince-Bythewood	Gina Prince-Bythewood	May 10, 2017	1AZG08	3.10
An unidentified individual attempts to steal the DOJ team's evidence before fleeing when Ashe intervenes. Although Shameeka strengthens the team's suspicions that Janae had Joey beaten, Janae denies killing Joey and claims the gun was planted in her church during a break-in. With the serial number of the gun filed off, Ashe convinces Javier to identify the owner. The gun is traced back to Cox, who says it was stolen, with a police report supporting his claim. Recovering from her injuries, Shirlane informs the DOJ team that Kiana also saw Cox shoot Joey and identified one of the officers as Derkin. Cox questions Platt on how his gun was found at Janae's church, leading to a heated conversation between Platt and Breeland. At the advice of her mother, Kerry reunites with Joshua. Caleb finds Shawn and returns him to Shameeka. After Breeland sends Ashe a copy of her arrest report, Ashe accuses Breeland of being present during Joey's death, prompting a physical altercation between the two that ends with Ashe gaining the upper hand. Upon returning to their hotel, Ashe and Preston have sex. Preston makes the video of Jesse's death public.
9	"Hour Nine: Come to Jesus"	Ami Canaan Mann	Christopher Lee Bythewood & Denitria Harris-Lawrence & Mick Betancourt	May 17, 2017	1AZG09	2.91
Now suspended by Platt, Joshua provides Preston with the real auxiliary deputy records in the hope of helping his case. The real records reveal that the auxiliary deputies were not qualified to participate in the patrols. After questioning Platt on why they have been protecting Cox, Breeland admits to Tess that he was present during Joey's death and has been blackmailing an individual to cover up the incident. Breeland offers the DOJ his testimony against the sheriff's office in exchange for no jail time. Ashe and Preston decline the deal, but the new DOJ team arrives and agrees to provide Breeland with full immunity in return for his cooperation. Ashe responds by informing Cox that a witness will identify him as Joey's killer, prompting Cox to make a public confession. Cox claims he mistakenly drew his gun instead of his taser when he shot Joey and blames Breeland for intimidating him to keep quiet. With his deal gone, Breeland nearly sends Ashe's arrest report to child services, but stops himself after receiving a message of support from Tess. Nevertheless, Ashe loses custody of Kai. Following Cox's confession, Janae is released and Sarah resigns when Eamons declines to denounce Cox. As a result of Ashe's actions, she and Preston are placed back in charge of the investigation. Breeland is shot to death outside his home.
10	"Hour Ten: Last Dance"	Reggie Rock Bythewood	Reggie Rock Bythewood & Marissa Jo Cerar	May 24, 2017	1AZG10	3.34
Grand jury hearings are held on Joshua's and Cox's cases. Joshua is indicted and arrested, but Cox is not. The DOJ team learns of Breeland's blackmail plot and suspects that he has important information in a storage unit. At the storage unit, Preston finds a recording of Platt telling Breeland to cover up Joey's death and realizes that Platt killed Breeland, leading to Platt's arrest. Eamons drops Cox's financial support and announces her educational initiative will be funded through other private resources. To increase African-American jury participation in Gate Station, Janae and Sarah organize members of the community to register to vote, which Caleb attends to speak before the Gate Station residents. Cox, who is revealed to have employed the handler, is confronted with a list of civil rights violations at his prisons by Preston, with Preston promising to ensure Cox is punished for his wrongdoing. As Preston leaves Gate Station, wondering if he and Ashe made it a better place, Ashe attends a supervised visit with Kai. In a flashback, Jesse and Joey briefly encounter each other at Jesse's campus.

== Reception ==
On Rotten Tomatoes, Shots Fired holds an approval rating of 84% based on 43 reviews. The site's critical consensus states, "Shots Fired tackles tough topics commendably -- and remains consistently compelling despite an occasionally meandering plot. Metacritic gives the miniseries a score of 66 out of 100 based on 27 critics.

James Poniewozik of The New York Times called the show "curious at first glance" but "complex". He praised the acting, especially that of Sanaa Lathan, the program's multilayered storylines, and compared it to the ABC's American Crime and HBO's The Wire. However, Poniewozik also criticized the show's handling of the political sideplots, and said "a lot of the exposition is ham-handed".

Writing for The Hollywood Reporter, Daniel Fienberg also praised Lathan's acting, but said the show offered "clunky mystery plotting". He went on to say "sometimes Shots Fired articulates its points smartly and with pragmatism, but other times you're stuck with characters saying things like "Liberals can be racist, too", as if that weren't already being illustrated everywhere. Perhaps there isn't as much hand-holding as in ABC's American Crime, but it's also significantly less ideologically ambitious than John Ridley's drama, which should come with footnotes." He also mocked the show's methods of stretching the plot across 10 episodes, However, he did conclude that "there is much to admire here".

USA Today mentioned the stellar directing crew and said the show features "interesting characters (especially women)". However, they said the story could've been "told more sensibly and efficiently". They praised the plot but overall had mixed impressions of the show overall.

Chris Cabin of Collider gave Shots Fired two out of five and called the show "timely", adding that it's "ultimately more melodrama than crime story or political polemic", but also argued that the show spends more time on the investigators' lives than the actual case. Ultimately, Cabin found the miniseries ambitious, but failed to capitalize.

IGN reviewer Jesse Schedeen gave the pilot a 6.7, or "Okay", rating and called the show's handling of the shooting "both callous and pointless". Schedeen wrote that the miniseries strays from the social conflict at hand to the mysteries of the deaths of the two young teens, and additionally the dialogue "becomes downright hamfisted", but praised the "strong cast".

Newsday gave the show a "B" rating, calling it "ambitious" and "at times a bit exhausting", but nevertheless had mostly praise for the miniseries.

Emily VanDerWerff of Vox gave Shots Fired three out of five, calling it "generally excellent", and said "Shots [Fired] aims to be American Crime or The Wire. It doesn't get there. The new limited series is a handsomely directed, nicely acted, overly complex mess." Praised were the characters and the premise, while also noting that "the show waters down interesting ideas at every turn...by the time I reached Shots Fired's 500th scene with too-loud music meant to tell me how to feel about what was happening, I wanted to be watching anything else".

The LA Times said the miniseries has ambitions to be "something big...like ABC's American Crime or FX's American Crime Story...in practice, it plays more like True Detective, Junior Grade". The romantic plot lines were criticized, saying "major and minor characters rapidly fall into bed, more to get some sex into the story than anything to do with the characters or the case at hand". Praise was directed towards its premise and acting, but its dialogue was negatively received, concluding that "Shots Fired lumbers as an issue drama".

Ben Travers of IndieWire gave the show a positive review, calling Shots Fired "messy but ambitious", with comparisons to American Crime and American Crime Story, "engaging", and "(mostly) well-executed", adding that the miniseries "stands out for the right reasons". Travers praised Lathan's performance as Ashe Akino, but added that her subplots push the show "into extreme melodrama, and make for a jarring change of pace". While criticizing the potential romantic subplots for Preston Terry and Ashe and stating "a few characters are reduced to representatives", Travers praised the miniseries' plot and its ability to "skirt...[tricky] questions". He gave the show a "B−" grade.

Hungry Watching gave the show a "C+" grade and called the show "timely and compelling", but also said it has a "lack of excitement that leaves me with no real compulsion to keep watching".

Vulture praised the show's ambition and "solid" cast, saying "Lathan [gets] the sort of lead role her charisma has long demanded". Further praise was made towards her character's unpredictability and the miniseries' musical choices for the soundtrack, while also finding Shots Fired to become "less daring and more predictable when it goes into procedural mode".

Deadline reviewer Dominic Patten said the miniseries "stays too close for comfort" and "doesn't ultimately take off much beyond the bounds of Big 4 procedurals". Patten also called the show "good and smart", but lamented that it didn't take more risks.

Danette Chazes of the AV/TV Club called Shots Fired "some of the most ambitious event television ever" that "cram[s a lot] into a limited series" and praised the "compelling story".
