= 3 A.M. (2001 film) =

2001 film by Lee Davis

- Film poster
- Directed by: Lee Davis
- Written by: Lee Davis
- Produced by: Sam Kitt; Spike Lee
- Starring: Danny Glover; Pam Grier; Michelle Rodriguez; Sergej Trifunović
- Cinematography: Enrique Chediak
- Edited by: Susan E. Morse
- Music by: Branford Marsalis
- Production company: 40 Acres & A Mule Filmworks
- Distributed by: Prism Leisure Corporation
- Release dates: January 2001 (Sundance); July 1, 2001 (United States)
- Running time: 88 minutes
- Country: United States
- Languages: English; Spanish; Serbian

3 A.M. is a 2001 American crime film written and directed by Lee Davis, and starring Danny Glover, Pam Grier, Sergej Trifunović, and Michelle Rodriguez. It is the first film written and directed by Davis, a protégé of director Spike Lee. The film follows the lives of several New York taxi drivers.

== Plot ==
New York City taxi drivers Hershey, Rasha, and Salgado all work for the same company. Their boss, known as Box, warns Rasha that she will fire him if he has another accident. He causes two accidents and is convinced he has killed a boy in the second one. With the help of Hershey and Cathy, a masseuse and prostitute he often visits, he flees back to his native Bosnia and Herzegovina, although he narrowly escaped death there, and some of his relatives were killed. Shortly before leaving the United States, he reads in the paper that the boy has survived.

After a failed marriage, Hershey is reluctant to commit to his girlfriend George. She in turn is concerned he might become the next victim of a cabbie killer who has already killed eleven taxi drivers.

Salgado was forced into prostitution when she was twelve years old. She was traumatized and killed her first customer. Now she thinks her passenger has a guardian devil who is after her, so she shoots him dead although he is begging for his life.

While Hershey is driving Rasha to the airport, they meet Salgado, whose taxi has broken down. They help her, unaware that she has just disposed of her passenger's body. She drops her gun in Hershey's taxi unnoticed.

Held at gunpoint by the cabbie killer, Hershey kills him with Salgado's gun. He proposes to George, and she tells him to ask her again the following week.

Box, who has been trying to get a loan from her bank so that her company can stay in business, manages to secure it with the help of her brother, who works for the bank.

== Cast ==
- Danny Glover as Hershey
- Pam Grier as George
- Sergej Trifunović as Rasha Andrić
- Michelle Rodriguez as Salgado
- Sarita Choudhury as Box
- Aasif Mandvi as Singh
- Bobby Cannavale as Jose
- John Ortiz as Hector
- Mike Starr as Theo
- Marika Domińczyk as Cathy
- Isaach de Bankolé as Angus
