= A Day Late and a Dollar Short =

2002 novel by Terry McMillan

- Viking Press first edition
- Author: Terry McMillan
- Language: English
- Genre: Novel
- Publisher: Viking Press
- Publication date: 2002
- Publication place: United States
- Media type: Print
- Preceded by: How Stella Got Her Groove Back

A Day Late and a Dollar Short (2002) is Terry McMillan's fifth novel. It is about a family in Las Vegas in 1994. Family charts in the end pages assist readers in keeping track of who is who in the large and dysfunctional Price family.

== Plot ==
Unlike McMillan's previous novels, A Day Late and a Dollar Short emphasizes the love and bonds of adult family members instead of friends. It explores relationships between parents, their children, and siblings over the course of a year.

When the reader is introduced to the characters, they witness a damaged family become torn even further apart. Near the resolution they will see how this torn family picks up the pieces to come together. The story is told from the perspectives of six different characters (each a member of the Price family). They deal with contemporary concepts like prescription drug addiction, alcoholism, incest, homosexuality, molestation, single parenthood, and divorce.

== Characters ==
Paris is divorced with a son who will soon be turning 17. She is always trying to help her family even though she hasn't been able to help herself. While she focuses on helping her family, she fails to acknowledge that her own life is in shambles. Her son is an amazing athlete who may have got his white girlfriend pregnant. She is considered to be the most successful of her siblings though she battles a prescription drug addiction behind closed doors.

Lewis is considered to be the screw up in the family. His constant troubles with the law confirm his family's low opinion of him. He shows up drunk and broke when he visits his mother in the hospital. He struggles to learn how to take control of his own life instead of blaming or depending on others. Lewis is also dealing with the repercussions of being sexually abused as a child and early onset arthritis. His ex-wife is married to a white man that wants to adopt his son.

Charlotte feels like she doesn't belong in the Price family. She feels like she never got as much attention as her older sister so she takes out her frustrations on the younger ones. She tends not to speak to her mother or older sister because she feels that they conspire against her. Charlotte has an openly gay son and two energetic daughters with ADD.

Janelle is the youngest of her siblings. She has a teenage daughter that she's struggling to raise. Janelle is also in denial and must face the realization that she has failed to protect her daughter within the confines of their own home. She has been going to college for 15 years and has still not earned her degree.

Viola Price is the dominant voice in the novel. She has a strained marriage with Cecil. They have four grown kids located in various places throughout the country. Their tumultuous marriage has lasted 38 years. In the beginning of the story she describes her family, "I don't even want to think about Cecil right now, because it might just bring on another attack. He's a bad habit I've had for thirty-eight years, which would make him my husband. Between him and these kids, I'm worn out. It's a miracle I can breathe at all. I had 'em so fast they felt more like a litter, except each one turned out to be a different animal. Paris is a female lion who don't roar loud enough. Lewis is a horse who don't pull his own weight. Charlotte is definitely a bull, and Janelle would have to be a sheep – a lamb is closer to it – 'cause she always being led out to some pasture and don't know how she got there."

Cecil, Viola's hardworking husband, has shut the door behind him for the last time and has taken his life in a new direction, regardless of what his wife and kids think about it.

The weight of bringing the family together rests on her already heavy shoulders. At the end of the novel, Viola dies from her last attack of asthma. Her death brings the family together as they read letters she wrote to them before dying. She teaches them that nothing is more important than family.

== Adaptations ==
The novel was adapted into a 2014 television movie on Lifetime, produced by Whoopi Goldberg and starring Whoopi Goldberg, Ving Rhames, Tichina Arnold, Kimberly Elise, Anika Noni Rose and Mekhi Phifer.
