= Holiday Heart =

2000 film by Robert Townsend

- British DVD artwork
- Written by: Cheryl L. West
- Directed by: Robert Townsend
- Starring: Ving Rhames; Alfre Woodard; Mykelti Williamson; Jesika Reynolds
- Music by: Stephen James Taylor
- Country of origin: United States
- Original language: English

Production
- Producers: Robert De Niro; Brad Epstein; Steven Felder; Jane Rosenthal; Cheryl L. West
- Cinematography: Jan Kiesser
- Editor: Sabrina Plisco
- Running time: 100 minutes
- Production companies: MGM Television; Tribeca Productions

Original release
- Network: Showtime
- Release: December 10, 2000

Holiday Heart is a 2000 television film directed by Robert Townsend and starring Ving Rhames, Alfre Woodard, Jesika Reynolds, and Mykelti Williamson. It aired on the cable TV channel Showtime, and was distributed on DVD by Metro-Goldwyn-Mayer. It was based on a play by Cheryl L. West, and involves a gay drag queen befriending a single mother and her daughter and trying to protect them from the criminal environment around them. It was nominated for a Golden Globe Award, for Woodard's performance, among other award nominations.

== Plot ==
Holiday Heart is a gay African American man who performs as a drag queen at a popular nightclub in Chicago. He is talented, tough, compassionate, and a dedicated Christian. After his boyfriend dies, he befriends a down-on-her-luck, drug-addicted, single woman, Wanda and her young daughter Niki. Holiday offers them a stable home and becomes a much-needed father figure for Niki.

However, things go astray when the mother becomes addicted to drugs again and after a series of bad relationships, starts one up with a successful drug dealer Silas who is as homophobic as he is chauvinist. Silas gives Holiday money and insists, with some threats, that he stay out of their lives, which Holiday agrees to do before preparing to move to Paris.

Wanda and Holiday have a fight, and Holiday reveals that he was raped in jail. He was sent there after killing a man to protect his mother.

Niki is then left alone. Silas has to go away on a "business" trip, because Wanda starts to use too much of his product, and she becomes a prostitute to feed her drug addiction. Holiday steps in to take care of Niki and raises her as his own daughter. Under Holiday's guidance, Niki is baptized at the local Church, and graduates from elementary school with honors.

Soon after, a more friendly Silas re-enters their lives, and is thankful for what Holiday has done. He has been getting a house in Florida ready for Wanda and Niki, but is still earning a living by selling drugs. Holiday and Silas become a sort of "odd couple" as Niki begins junior high school, with Silas more willing to respect and tolerate Holiday.

After Silas brings Niki along on one of his illicit sales, she runs away and bumps into her mother, who is in a flophouse turning tricks. Ricky, Wanda's new boyfriend, shows pedophilic interest in Niki and Wanda agrees to prostitute her in exchange for heroin. However, Niki escapes as Ricky beats Wanda in anger. Silas finds Niki and leaves her in the care of Holiday.

As an angry teenager, Niki begins to rebel, and Holiday loses his temper and slaps her. Right before Christmas, Wanda appears at the gay nightclub where Holiday works and wants his help in getting clean and sober. The two walk to Holiday's car, with a bike for Niki, when Ricky and his associate, assault Wanda and steals Niki's bike gift. Holiday manages to beat them up, but not before Ricky gets into his car and runs over Wanda, killing her. He then is stopped by officers.

The film then shifts to a few months later, where Niki is home from "spring break" and visiting her mother's grave with Holiday and Silas. Silas has returned and informs Niki and Holiday that when they get back from a trip to Paris, he has a surprise waiting for them.

== Cast ==
- Ving Rhames as Roy "Holiday" Heart
- Alfre Woodard as Wanda Dean
- Jesika Reynolds as Nicole "Niki" Dean
- Mykelti Williamson as Silas
- Johnathan Wesley Wallace as "Jambalaya" Blue
- Philip Maurice Hayes as Sergeant
- Blu Mankuma as Pastor Henry
- Lorena Gale as Mrs. Owens
- James Kidnie as Penthouse M.C.
- Benz Antoine as Fisher
- Gay Fauchon as Travel Agent Dan
- Ron Selmour as L.T.
- Patricia Idlette as Mrs. Walker
- Mary Antonini as Sarah
- Emy Aneke as Ricky
- Roher Haskett as UPS Delivery Man
- Errol G. Farquharson as Goon
- Bob Dawson as Farmer
- Doug Cameron as Taxi Driver
- Scott Swanson as The Principal
- Willie Taylor as Himself
- Steven Miller as "Velveeta"
- Mark Finlay as Drag Queen #3
- Rhys Williams as "Deuce"
- Peter Williams as Phillip St. Paul
- Vivian Von Brokenhymen as Dressing Room Drag Queen
