= Good Fences =

2003 comedy-drama television film

- DVD cover based on the painting American Gothic
- Genre: Comedy-drama
- Based on: Good Fences by Erika Ellis
- Written by: Trey Ellis
- Directed by: Ernest R. Dickerson
- Starring: Danny Glover; Whoopi Goldberg
- Music by: George Duke
- Country of origin: United States
- Original language: English

Production
- Executive producers: Spike Lee; Sam Kitt
- Producers: Danny Glover; Whoopi Goldberg
- Cinematography: Jonathan Freeman
- Editor: Stephen Lovejoy
- Running time: 119 minutes
- Production company: 40 Acres and a Mule Filmworks

Original release
- Network: Showtime
- Release: February 2, 2003

Good Fences is a 2003 American comedy-drama television film directed by Ernest Dickerson and written by Trey Ellis, based on the 1997 novel of the same name by his wife Erika Ellis. The film is about the stresses of prejudice on an upwardly mobile black family in 1970s Greenwich, Connecticut. Danny Glover plays the overworked, stressed husband and Whoopi Goldberg plays his steadfast wife.

Good Fences was produced by Spike Lee's 40 Acres and a Mule Filmworks. It premiered at the 2003 Sundance Film Festival, and aired on Showtime on February 2, 2003. Goldberg won an Image Award for her role.

== Cast ==
- Whoopi Goldberg as Mabel Spader
- Danny Glover as Tom Spader
- Mo'Nique as Ruth Crisp
- Ashley Archer as Stormy (age 13)
- Ryan Michelle Bathe as Stormy (age 17)
- Vincent McCurdy-Clark as Tommy-Two (age 12)
- Zachary Simmons Glover as Tommy-Two (age 17)

== Reception ==
The New York Times reviewed the film positively, as did Dove.
