= Disappearing Acts =

- Official DVD cover
- Based on: Disappearing Acts by Terry McMillan
- Written by: Lisa Jones
- Directed by: Gina Prince-Bythewood
- Starring: Sanaa Lathan; Wesley Snipes
- Country of origin: United States
- Original language: English

Production
- Producers: Terry McMillan; Wesley Snipes; Kimiko Fox
- Cinematography: Tami Reiker
- Editor: Françoise Bonnot
- Running time: 115 minutes
- Production company: HBO Films
- Budget: $10 million

Original release
- Network: HBO
- Release: December 9, 2000

Disappearing Acts is a 2000 American made-for-television romantic drama film directed by Gina Prince-Bythewood, and stars Sanaa Lathan and Wesley Snipes. The film is an adaptation of the New York Times best-selling 1989 novel of the same name by Terry McMillan, and originally aired on HBO on December 9, 2000.

== Plot ==
Zora Banks (Sanaa Lathan) moves from Manhattan to her newly renovated brownstone in Brooklyn. Franklin Swift (Wesley Snipes) is polishing the floors in what will be her new apartment. He informs her that she cannot move in yet due to her wood grain floors not being dry. An upset Zora threatens to fire one of the moving men, who proceed to leave her furniture and boxes on the sidewalk. Desperate, she asks Franklin to help her move her things. After moving her in, they begin to talk and she accepts his offer to help her unpack and get settled in.

Later while Zora is walking home, she finds Franklin waiting for her on the stoop and chastises him for coming by without warning. Franklin says he was waiting for her because he wanted to see her. Zora invites Franklin inside. They cannot hide their mutual attraction and proceed to have sex. Later, the couple talk of their dreams and aspirations; Zora wants to become a singer and Franklin wants to get his contracting business off the ground. Both confess that they were putting off love until they got themselves together. Franklin then tells Zora that he is not a wealthy man. Zora reassures him, stating that she is not looking for a rich man.

The two spend a lot of time together eating home cooked meals, playing Scrabble, and watching television. While getting a drink with his friend Jimmy (Clark Johnson), Franklin expresses that he likes Zora because she listens and they talk more than have sex. Jimmy then repays a loan that Franklin had made him. Franklin uses part of the money to get Zora's piano out of layaway. Zora then auditions for up-and-coming producer Reggie Baptiste (Q-Tip), and gets cut a deal to do a six-song demo with him.

Franklin confesses to Zora that he dropped out of high school in the eleventh grade, never earning a GED. He also tells her that although separated for the last four years, he is still married with two sons. Zora does not take the news well and Franklin accuses her of caring more about "degrees and dollars" than their relationship.

The next day, Zora finds Franklin at work and admits that she would not have gotten involved with him had she known the truth about him earlier. She then confides that she loves him and asks him to move in with her, expressing the desire to meet his children. In return, he tells her he loves her and promises that as soon as he gets the money he will get the divorce.

Zora meets Franklin's sons, Marcus (Dequan Henderson) and Tyree (Fernando Phifer Cameron), and while the younger Tyree warms up to Zora quickly after she teaches him some notes on her piano, Marcus is not so welcoming to her. Despite all the obstacles, the couple continue to fall deeper in love, but things come to a head when Zora suffers an epileptic seizure while sleeping. The next morning when confronted by Franklin on why he never knew of her condition, she says she did not want to scare him off. Franklin reassures her that it will take more than that to get him to walk away.

A while later, Zora gets pregnant. She wants an abortion since she does not think the time is right. But Franklin convinces her to keep the baby, and nine months later she gives birth to a boy named Jeremiah.

After the birth of the baby, times get really hard for Zora and Frankie. He is out of work again and because of this he drinks and forgets to pick up the baby from daycare, this causes Zora to leave work to pick up the baby and miss her recording session with Reg. Reg is unhappy about this so she loses her demo deal. One night Zora and Frankie get in a heated argument and they break up. A heart broken Frankie drinks and plays sad records while Zora sleeps in the other room. Frankie then goes to the room and tries to have makeup sex with Zora, she pushes him away and says "I'm leaving and when I come back tomorrow I want you out of my house". While she is away a distraught and angry Frankie vandalizes their once home together with a hammer and leaves.

About seven months go by and Franklin goes to Zora's house. He says he wants to see his son. She lets him in and Frankie holds his son and puts him to bed. The ex-couple then converse about what has been going on. Frankie tells Zora that he is taking his contractor test the next day and that he got his GED. Zora tells him that she writes songs and that one of them is on the radio. While walking out the door Frankie talks about their love and how it was real no matter what the timing was. He leaves and she follows him and says "I never got to beat you in Scrabble". He smiles, goes back upstairs and they play Scrabble.

== Cast ==
- Sanaa Lathan as Zora Banks
- Wesley Snipes as Franklin Swift
- Regina Hall as Portia
- Lisa Arrindell Anderson as Claudette
- Q-Tip as Reg Baptiste
- Clark Johnson as Jimmy
- John Amos as Mr. Swift
- CCH Pounder as Mrs. Swift
- Aunjanue Ellis as Pam Swift
- John Beasley as Mr. Banks
- Laz Alonso as Martinez
- Michael Imperioli as Vinney
- Fernando Cameron Phifer as Kevin

== Reception ==
=== Accolades ===
2002 NAACP Image Awards

- Outstanding Television Movie, Mini-Series or Dramatic Special
