= Reggie Rock Bythewood =

American film producer

- Born: July 7, 1965 (age 61); The Bronx, New York City
- Occupations: Film director, writer, actor, film producer
- Spouse: Gina Prince-Bythewood (m. 1998)

Reggie Rock Bythewood (born July 7, 1965) is an American filmmaker and actor. He is known for directing the film Dancing in September (2000) and creating the television series Shots Fired and Swagger.

== Life and career ==
Bythewood grew up in The Bronx, New York City. He loved going to the movies and to Yankees games with his father. However, his main love was boxing. When his parents split up, his mother forbade him to pursue the sport. He was not allowed to go to the neighborhood boxing gym anymore because she thought it was too dangerous. During this time, hip hop was considered a fad outside of New York. However, in the Bronx, it was an emerging art form. Bythewood was consumed by the movement. He was a rapper in a neighborhood hip hop crew. During assemblies in junior high school, he and other school mates were allowed to get on stage and break dance.

After junior high, Bythewood's main focus became acting. He went to the High School of Performing Arts as a drama major. However, the school did not allow students to work as professional actors. During his senior year, Bythewood was cast in the soap opera Another World, he left Performing Arts and attended Quintanos School for the Young Professionals. While on the set he acted with Morgan Freeman, Joe Morton, Kyra Sedgwick and many others.

After high school, Bythewood acted in a John Sayles film The Brother from Another Planet. Sayles inspired Bythewood to write and direct and he shifted his focus away from acting. He graduated from Marymount Manhattan College with a BFA in theater. He co-founded a New York City based theater company called The Tribe which performed plays written and directed by Bythewood. The aim of the theater company was to entertain while raising consciousness. Several activists attended Bythewood's plays including Black Panther Jamal Joseph who became one of his best friends.

In 1990, he was offered a role in the soap opera One Life To Live. However, he turned down the offer and moved to Los Angeles to pursue a career in screenwriting. He became one of the first members of Walt Disney's prestigious Writers Fellowship Program. From there, he was hired as a writer on the hit NBC comedy series A Different World where he met his future wife, Gina Prince-Bythewood. He went on to write and produce Dick Wolf's drama series New York Undercover. He also did production rewrites for action films produced by Joel Silver. After attending the Million Man March, he wrote the screenplay for Spike Lee's indie film Get on the Bus. Bythewood was also one of the film's investors. With the 2007 Writer's Strike looming, Bythewood was hired to do the rewrite for Notorious. He completed several drafts and the film was green lit. When the strike ended, Bythewood went back to the project to do more revisions and stayed on until the film wrapped. He was given written by credit along with the film's initial writer, Cheo Hodari Coker.

Bythewood made his feature film directorial debut on the acclaimed indie flick Dancing in September which screened at the Sundance Film Festival. It was acquired by HBO and became an HBO original movie. He also directed Biker Boyz, the documentary "Daddy's Girl" (starring Laila Ali), the ESPN 30 for 30 documentary "One Night in Vegas", and Gun Hill the two-hour pilot which he won the 2014 NAACP Image Award for. In 2017, he co-created the ten-hour event series Shots Fired with Gina Prince-Bythewood and directed the season one finale starring Sanaa Lathan, Richard Dreyfuss, Helen Hunt, and Stephan James.

Bythewood was chairman of the B-Dads organization. Along with other fathers, he fed homeless families in Los Angeles, California, raised thousands of dollars for the Sickle Cell Disease Foundation and conducted workshops on fatherhood. He has also spoken on various panels regarding police reform such as the annual convention for NOBLE (National Organization of Black Law Enforcement).

== Personal life ==
Bythewood resides in Southern California with his wife, filmmaker Gina Prince-Bythewood, and their two sons. The two met on the set of The Fresh Prince of Bel-Air before both being hired on A Different World and married in 1998.

== Filmography ==
=== Film ===
Year	Title	Director	Writer	Producer
1996	Get on the Bus	No	Yes	No
2000	Dancing in September	Yes	Yes	Yes
2003	Biker Boyz	Yes	Yes	No
2009	Notorious	No	Yes	No
2014	Beyond the Lights	No	No	Yes

Acting roles

Year	Title	Role
1977	Fight for Your Life	Floyd Turner
1984	The Brother from Another Planet	Rickey
1984	Exterminator 2	Spidey
1988	The Beat	Church Bystander
1989	Vampire's Kiss	Danny Lambeaux

=== Television ===
Year	Title	Director	Writer	Producer	Creator	Notes
1992-1993	A Different World	No	Yes	No	No	5 episodes
1993	South of Sunset	No	Yes	No	No	Episode "Newspaper Boy"
1994-1997	New York Undercover	No	Yes	Yes	No	Wrote 16 episodes
1997-1998	Players	No	Yes	No	Yes	
2007	Reflections	No	Yes	Co-producer	No	TV short
2010	30 for 30	Yes	No	No	No	Episode "One Night in Vegas"
2017	Shots Fired	Yes	Yes	Executive	Yes	Wrote 3 episodes, directed episode "Hour Ten: Last Dance"
2021-2023	Swagger	Yes	Yes	Executive	Yes	Wrote 5 episodes, directed 5 episodes
2026	A Different World	Yes	Yes	Execuitve	Yes	5 episodes

TV movies

Year	Title	Director	Writer	Executive Producer
2007	Daddy's Girl	Yes	No	No
2014	Gun Hill	Yes	Yes	Yes

Acting role

Year	Title	Role	Note
1982-1983	Another World	R.J. Morgan	6 episodes
