= Gun Hill (film) =

2014 television film

- Genre: Drama
- Written by: Reggie Rock Bythewood
- Directed by: Reggie Rock Bythewood
- Starring: Larenz Tate
- Country of origin: United States
- Original language: English

Production
- Producer: Daniel Hank

Original release
- Network: BET
- Release: July 2, 2014

Gun Hill is a 2014 American television film directed by Reggie Rock Bythewood and starring Larenz Tate. Produced in 2011, the film was delayed for almost three years until BET announced June 6, 2014, that Gun Hill will premiere on its network on July 2, 2014. The film was produced as a pilot for a possible new drama series on BET.

== Synopsis ==
A pair of twin brothers take different paths in life: one is an undercover D.E.A. agent and the other is a convicted felon. Trane is a federal narcotics agent with a secret joint-task force. Bird is a recently freed convict who plays by a different set of rules. However, when Trane is murdered, Bird assumes his brother's identity, seeking his brother's murderer and a second chance at life while grappling with morality, fatherhood and love.

== Cast ==
- Larenz Tate as Trane Stevens / Bird Stevens
- Emayatzy Corinealdi as Janelle Evans
- Tawny Cypress as Andrea Logan
- Aisha Hinds as Arlene Carter
- Michael Aronov as Danny Raden
- Phyllis Yvonne Stickney as Marva Stevens
- Shanti Ashanti as Semi Faraj
- Hisham Tawfiq as Captain Sanford
- Daniel Stewart Sherman as Mason
- David J. Cork as Timms
