= 7th Annual Black Reel Awards =

Film-industry awards in 2006

7th Black Reel Awards
- Date: February 18, 2006
- Location: Washington, D.C.

The 2006 Black Reel Awards, which annually recognize and celebrate the achievements of black people in feature, independent and television films, took place in Washington, D.C., on February 18, 2006. Lackawanna Blues swept the awards with six wins, whilst in the film nominations Crash and Hustle & Flow each took home three awards.

== Winners and nominees ==
Winners are listed first and highlighted in bold.

Best Film	Best Director
**Crash**; Coach Carter; Four Brothers; Hitch; Hustle & Flow	**Thomas Carter – Coach Carter**; Malcolm D. Lee – Roll Bounce; John Singleton – Four Brothers; Tim Story – Fantastic Four
Best Actor	Best Actress
**Terrence Howard – Hustle & Flow**; Don Cheadle – Crash; Idris Elba – The Gospel; Samuel L. Jackson – Coach Carter; Will Smith – Hitch	**Kimberly Elise – Diary of a Mad Black Woman**; Rosario Dawson – Rent; Nona Gaye – The Gospel; Queen Latifah – Beauty Shop; Zoe Saldaña – Guess Who
Best Supporting Actor	Best Supporting Actress
**Terrence Howard – Crash**; Anthony Anderson – Hustle & Flow; Chiwetel Ejiofor – Serenity; Ludacris – Crash; Jeffrey Wright – Syriana	**Taraji P. Henson – Hustle & Flow**; Rosario Dawson – Sin City; Thandie Newton – Crash; Wanda Sykes – Monster-in-Law; Tracie Thoms – Rent
Best Screenplay, Adapted or Original	Best Breakthrough Performance
**Norman Vance Jr. – Roll Bounce**; Rob Hardy – The Gospel; Tyler Perry – Diary of a Mad Black Woman	**Brandon T. Jackson – Roll Bounce**; Ashanti – Coach Carter; Tyler Perry – Diary of a Mad Black Woman
Outstanding Original Soundtrack	Best Ensemble (Awarded to Casting Directors)
**Hustle & Flow**; Four Brothers; Hitch; Rent; Roll Bounce	**Sarah Finn and Randi Hiller – Crash**; Chris Gray and Kimberly Hardin– Hustle & Flow; Kimberly Hardin – Four Brothers; Tiffany Little Canfield and Bernard Telsey – Rent; Monica Swann – Roll Bounce
Best Television Miniseries or Movie	Outstanding Director in a Television Miniseries or Movie
**Lackawanna Blues (HBO) – Halle Berry and Vincent Cirrincione**; Kojak (USA Network) – Tom Thayer and Steve Feke; Miracle's Boys (TeenNick) – Nicole Silver and Orly Wiseman; Sometimes in April (HBO) – Daniel Delume; Their Eyes Were Watching God (ABC) – Quincy Jones and Oprah Winfrey	**George C. Wolfe – Lackawanna Blues (HBO)**; Spike Lee – Miracle's Boys (TeenNick); Spike Lee – Sucker Free City (Showtime); Darnell Martin – Their Eyes Were Watching God (ABC); Raoul Peck – Sometimes in April (HBO)
Best Actor in a TV Movie or Limited Series	Best Actress in a TV Movie or Limited Series
**Michael Ealy – Their Eyes Were Watching God (ABC)**; Idris Elba – Sometimes in April (HBO); Delroy Lindo – The Exonerated (truTV); Anthony Mackie – Sucker Free City (Showtime); Ving Rhames – Kojak (USA Network)	**S. Epatha Merkerson – Lackawanna Blues (HBO)**; Halle Berry – Their Eyes Were Watching God (ABC); Roselyn Sanchez – Kojak (USA Network)
Best Supporting Actor in a TV Movie or Limited Series	Best Supporting Actress in a TV Movie or Limited Series
**Jeffrey Wright – Lackawanna Blues (HBO)**; Oris Erhuero – Sometimes in April (HBO); Terrence Howard – Lackawanna Blues (HBO); Sean Nelson – Miracle's Boys (TeenNick); Ruben Santiago-Hudson – Their Eyes Were Watching God (ABC)	**Carmen Ejogo – Lackawanna Blues (HBO)**; Nicki Micheaux – Their Eyes Were Watching God (ABC); Rosie Perez – Lackawanna Blues (HBO); Adina Porter – Lackawanna Blues (HBO); Jordan Puryear – Miracle's Boys (TeenNick)
Outstanding Screenplay in a TV Movie or Limited Series
**Ruben Santiago-Hudson – Lackawanna Blues (HBO)**; Kevin Arkadie, Stephen Langford and Dawn Urbont – Miracle's Boys (TeenNick); Suzan-Lori Parks, Misan Sagay and Bobby Smith Jr. – Their Eyes Were Watching God (ABC); Raoul Peck – Sometimes in April (HBO); Alex Tse – Sucker Free City (Showtime)
Outstanding Independent Film	Outstanding Independent Documentary
**Constellation – Jordan Walker-Pearlman**; Love Trap – Frank B. Goodin II; On the One – Charles Randolph-Wright; On the Verge of a Fever – John L'Ecuyer; Proud – Mary Pat Kelly	**Unknown Winner**; Bastards of the Party – Cle Sloan; Letter to the President – Thomas Gibson; The Untold Story of Emmett Louis Till – Keith Beauchamp; A Killing in Choctaw – Chike Nwoffiah
