= Rafael Cordero =

Rafael Cordero may refer to:

- Rafael "Churumba" Cordero Santiago (1942–2004), former mayor of Ponce, Puerto Rico
- Rafael Cordero (educator) (1790–1868), known as "The Father of Public Education in Puerto Rico"
