= Their Eyes Were Watching God (film) =

2005 American television film

- DVD cover
- Genre: Drama
- Based on: Their Eyes Were Watching God by Zora Neale Hurston
- Written by: Suzan-Lori Parks; Misan Sagay; Bobby Smith Jr.
- Directed by: Darnell Martin
- Presented by: Oprah Winfrey
- Starring: Halle Berry; Ruben Santiago-Hudson; Michael Ealy
- Music by: Terence Blanchard
- Country of origin: United States
- Original language: English

Production
- Executive producers: Oprah Winfrey; Kate Forte
- Producer: Matthew Carlisle
- Cinematography: Checco Varese
- Editor: Peter C. Frank
- Running time: 113 minutes
- Production companies: Harpo Films; Touchstone Television

Original release
- Network: ABC
- Release: March 6, 2005

Their Eyes Were Watching God is a 2005 American television drama film based upon Zora Neale Hurston's 1937 novel of the same name. The film was directed by Darnell Martin, written by Suzan-Lori Parks, Misan Sagay, and Bobby Smith Jr., and produced by Oprah Winfrey's Harpo Productions (Winfrey served as the host for the broadcast). It stars Halle Berry, Ruben Santiago-Hudson, and Michael Ealy, and aired on ABC on March 6, 2005.

== Plot ==
The plot of Their Eyes Were Watching God revolves around the life of Janie Crawford, an African-American woman living in the early 20th century. The story follows Janie's journey of self-discovery and her search for independence and love.

Janie's story is narrated through a frame narrative, where her friend Pheoby Watson listens to Janie's account and reflects upon it. Janie tells her life story, starting with her childhood and early experiences growing up in rural Florida. She describes her first two marriages, which were arranged by others and didn't bring her the fulfillment she sought.

However, it is her third marriage to Tea Cake, a younger man, that becomes the central focus of the story. Janie experiences true love and a deep connection with Tea Cake. They face challenges and obstacles together, including a hurricane that tests their relationship and forces them to confront their vulnerabilities.

Through her relationship with Tea Cake, Janie gains a sense of empowerment, self-expression, and freedom. However, their happiness is short-lived as Tea Cake becomes ill and Janie is forced to make difficult decisions.

The novel explores themes of love, gender roles, racial identity, and the quest for personal fulfillment. It portrays the experiences of African-American women in the early 20th century, highlighting the struggles they faced in a society marked by racism and gender inequality.

== Cast ==
- Halle Berry as Janie Crawford
- Michael Ealy as Tea Cake
- Ruben Santiago-Hudson as Joe Starks
- Nicki Micheaux as Phoebe Watson
- Lorraine Toussaint as Pearl Stone
- Ruby Dee as Nanny Marnie
- Terrence Howard as Amos Hicks
- Gabriel Casseus as Sam Watson
- Artel Kayàru as Motor Boat
- Jensen Atwood as Johnny Taylor
- Kevin Daniels as Liege Moss
- Wayne Duvall as Dr. Gordon
- Mel Winkler as Logan Killicks
- Maura Gale as Lula Moss
- Henry Brown as Water Stone

== Production ==
Began shooting April 5, 2004 and completed shooting May 24, 2004 in Florida.

== Reception ==
Catering to Winfrey's expected TV audience, the film largely avoided the more controversial themes of race, gender, and power that Hurston explored in her novel. Karen Valby of Entertainment Weekly comments, "While the book chews on meaty questions of race and identity, the movie largely resigns itself to the realm of sudsy romance." New York Times critic Virginia Heffernan said, "[T]he film is less a literary tribute than a visual fix of Harlequin Romance: Black Southern Series— all sensual soft-core scenes and contemporary, accessible language."

Sharon L. Jones, an English professor at Wright State University, agreed that the film was quite different from the novel. She said that the novel emphasizes Janie's life journey with others who are part of her establishing an identity, and she is sometimes overpowered by them. Jones says the film leaves out many important concepts that help convey the central theme. She says that Harpo's production was thought to address a more general idea of love to reach a broad range of audience, believed to be the majority-white females of Winfrey's TV audience.

== Awards and nominations ==
Awarding body	Award	Nominee	Result
American Cinema Editors	Best Edited Miniseries or Motion Picture for Commercial Television	Peter C. Frank	Nominated
Austin Film Critics Association	Breakthrough Artist Award	Terrence Howard	Won
Black Movie Awards	Outstanding Television Movie	Matthew Carlisle, Kate Forte, Quincy Jones and Oprah Winfrey	Nominated
Black Reel Awards	Best Television Miniseries or Movie	Their Eyes Were Watching God	Nominated
Black Reel Awards	Outstanding Actor in a Miniseries or Movie	Michael Ealy	Won
Black Reel Awards	Outstanding Actress in a Miniseries or Movie	Halle Berry	Nominated
Black Reel Awards	Outstanding Supporting Actor in a Miniseries or Movie	Ruben Santiago-Hudson	Nominated
Black Reel Awards	Outstanding Supporting Actress in a Miniseries or Movie	Nicki Micheaux	Nominated
Black Reel Awards	Outstanding Director in a Miniseries or Movie	Darnell Martin	Nominated
Black Reel Awards	Outstanding Screenplay in a Miniseries or Movie	Suzan-Lori Parks, Misan Sagay and Bobby Smith, Jr.	Nominated
Costume Designers Guild	Outstanding Made for Television Movie or Miniseries	Eduardo Castro	Nominated
Directors Guild of America Awards	Outstanding Directorial Achievement in Movies for Television	Darnell Martin	Nominated
Golden Globe Awards	Best Actress – Miniseries or Television Film	Halle Berry	Nominated
NAACP Image Awards	Outstanding Television Movie, Miniseries or Dramatic Special	Their Eyes Were Watching God	Nominated
NAACP Image Awards	Outstanding Actor in a Television Movie, Miniseries or Dramatic Special	Michael Ealy	Nominated
NAACP Image Awards	Outstanding Actor in a Television Movie, Miniseries or Dramatic Special	Ruben Santiago-Hudson	Nominated
NAACP Image Awards	Outstanding Actress in a Television Movie, Miniseries or Dramatic Special	Halle Berry	Nominated
Primetime Emmy Awards	Outstanding Lead Actress in a Miniseries or Movie	Halle Berry	Nominated
Primetime Emmy Awards	Outstanding Hairstyling for a Miniseries, Movie or a Special	Alan D'Angerio and Barbara Lorenz	Nominated
Satellite Awards	Best Actor in a Supporting Role in a Series, Miniseries or Motion Picture Made For Television	Ruben Santiago-Hudson	Nominated
