= Celestina Cordero =

Puerto Rican educator

- Born: Celestina Cordero y Molina; April 6, 1787; San Juan, Puerto Rico
- Died: January 1862 (aged 74); San Juan, Puerto Rico
- Occupation: Educator

Notes
- 1. Celestina Cordero established a school for girls in San Juan, Puerto Rico.; 2. Her brother was Rafael Cordero who is known as "The Apostol Education in Puerto Rico".

Celestina Cordero (April 6, 1787 – January, 1862), was an educator who in 1802 founded a school for girls "escuela de amigas" in San Juan, Puerto Rico.

== Early years ==
Cordero (birth name: Celestina Cordero y Molina) was second of three children born in San Juan, Puerto Rico to Lucas Cordero and Rita Molina. Her older sister was named Gregoria and her younger brother was Rafael Cordero. Cordero's father, a former slave, was a "Freeman." In 1789, the Spanish Crown issued the "Royal Decree of Graces of 1789," also known as El Código Negro (The Black Code). In accordance with El Código Negro a slave could buy their freedom and thus a former slave would become known as “freeman” or “freewoman.”

Cordero's teachers in San Juan, her father was an experienced artisan who also worked in the tobacco fields, during his free time he taught his children and those in the neighborhood his artisan skills, while Cordero's mother taught her children the importance of obtaining an education.

Cordero's parents taught her and her siblings how to read and write. Inspired by her mother's teachings, Cordero developed the love of teaching others. It was in San Juan where Cordero and her brother began their careers as educators.

== Educator ==
During the Spanish colonization of the island, Puerto Rico, which depended on an agricultural economy, had an illiteracy rate of over 80% at the beginning of the 19th century. Most women were home educated. The first library in Puerto Rico was established in 1642 in the Convent of San Francisco, and access to its books was limited to those who belonged to the religious order. The only women who had access to the libraries and who could afford books, were the wives and daughters of Spanish government officials or wealthy landowners. Those who were poor had to resort to oral story-telling in what are traditionally known in Puerto Rico as Coplas and Decimas.

Cordero and her brother in San Juan. Despite the fact that she was subject to racial discrimination because she was a black free woman, she continued to pursue her goal of teaching others regardless of their race and or social standing. In 1802, Cordero founded a school for girls in San Juan called "escuelas de amigas.

== Legacy ==
Cordero never married and died penniless in her home in San Juan on January, 1862. Puerto Rico recognized her brother Rafael as "The Apostol of Public Education" in Puerto Rico. However, her contributions to the educational system of the island are seldom mentioned. On December 9, 2013, Pope Francis advanced the sainthood of her brother when he declared that he lived the Christian virtues in a heroic way and is venerable.

In 2012, the library of the Dr. José Celso Barbosa Jr. High School dedicated its "Women Day" to Celestina Cordero.

== See also ==
- List of Puerto Ricans
- History of women in Puerto Rico
- List of Puerto Ricans of African descent
- African immigration to Puerto Rico
