= List of Afro–Puerto Ricans =

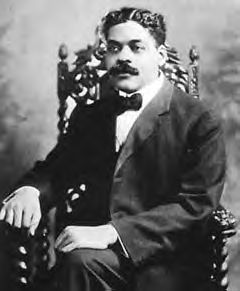
Arturo Alfonso Schomburg

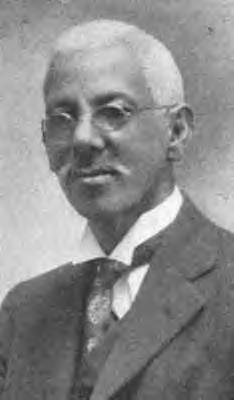
José Celso Barbosa

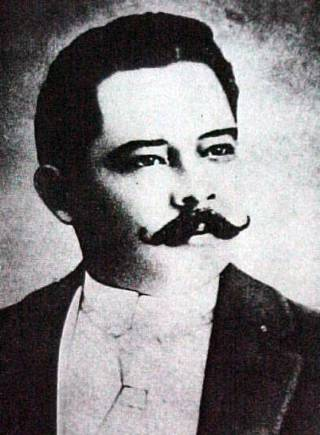
Juan Morel Campos

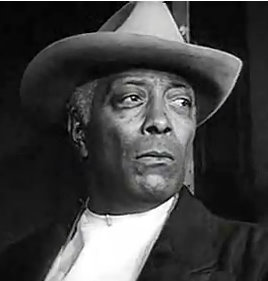
Juano Hernández

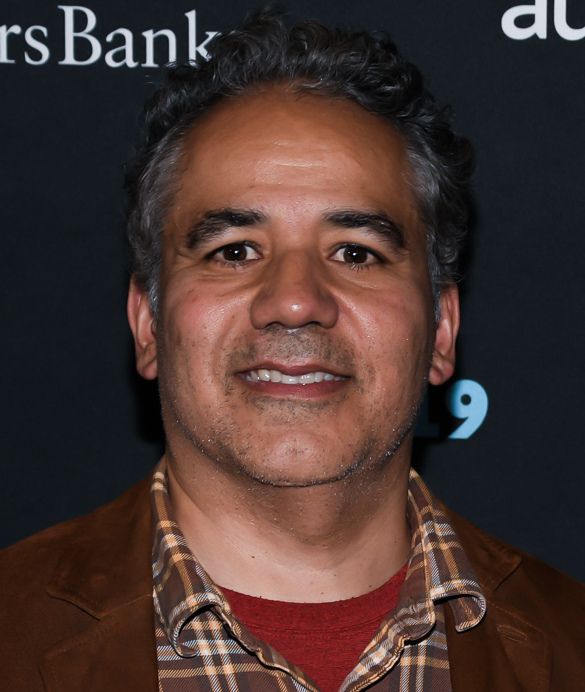
John Ortiz

This is a list of notable Puerto Ricans of significant African ancestry, including visually mixed-race (mulatto) individuals, which represents a significant portion of the Puerto Rican population. It includes people born in or living in the mainland United States, some of whom may be of full Puerto Rican ancestry while others only partially Puerto Rican through one parent. This list contains the names of persons who meet the Notability criteria, even if the person does not have an article yet. Additions to the list must be listed in alphabetical order by surname.

Each addition to the list must also provide a reliable verifiable source which cites the person's notability and/or the person's link to Puerto Rico, otherwise the name will be removed.

== List ==
- Juan Boria - poet reciter of the Afro-Caribbean genre of poetry.
- Andres "Dres" Vargas Titus - lead rapper of the alternative hip hop duo Black Sheep
- Randy Ariel Ortiz Acevedo - reggaetón artist, member of the duo "Jowell y Randy"
- David Luciano Acosta - reggaetón artist, known as "Baby Ranks"
- Anuel AA - reggaetón artist
- Ángel Aguilar - rapper
- Carlos Alomar - guitarist
- Cayetano "Tite" Curet Alonso - composer of over 2,000 salsa songs
- La La Anthony - entertainer and actress, MTV VJ
- Carmelo Anthony - former professional basketball player
- Rick Avilés - actor and comedian
- Lloyd Banks - rapper
- Dr. José Celso Barbosa - medical physician, sociologist, and political leader of Puerto Rico, statehood advocate, first Puerto Rican with a US medical degree
- Dr. Pilar Barbosa - educator, historian and political activist
- Jean-Michel Basquiat - Neo-expressionist painter and artist
- Pura Belpré - first Puerto Rican librarian in New York City
- Wilfred Benítez - boxer; won world championships in three separate weight divisions; youngest world champion in boxing history
- Ángela Bofill - jazz and R&B singer
- Dr. Ramón Emeterio Betances - doctor, abolitionist, revolutionary, poet, and independence advocate, regarded as "El Padre de la Patria" (Father of the Nation)
- Bia - rapper
- Iván M. Calderón - boxer
- Iván P. Calderón - Major League Baseball player
- Tego Calderón - reggaetón artist
- Jasmine Camacho-Quinn - 110-meter hurdles record holder and Olympic gold medallist
- José Campeche - Puerto Rican rococo artist
- Dr. Pedro Albizu Campos - politician and former leader of the Nationalist Party of Puerto Rico, which advocated for independence
- Juan Morel Campos - composer of danza
- Dr. José Ferrer Canales - educator, writer, pro-independence political activist
- Maidel Amador Canales - reggaetón artist, known as "La Sista"
- Irene Cara - singer and actress
- Ashley Ann Cariño - second black woman to compete in Miss Universe beauty pageant as Miss Puerto Rico
- Eladio Carrión - rapper
- Desiree Casado - former actress
- Orlando "Peruchín" Cepeda - baseball player, inducted into the National Baseball Hall of Fame by the Veterans Committee
- Pedro "Perucho" Cepeda - baseball player, father of Orlando, considered one of the greatest players of his generation
- Rafael Cepeda - folk musician and composer; patriarch of the Cepeda family; Afro–Puerto Rican folk music, especially bomba. Related to Pedro and Orlando Cepeda
- Nero Chen - professional boxer
- Roberto Clemente Walker - baseball player, first Latin American to be selected and the only current Hall of Famer for whom the mandatory five-year waiting period was waived
- Roberto Clemente Jr. - baseball broadcaster and former baseball player.
- Carlos Colón - former WWE wrestler
- Carlito - WWE wrestler; son of Carlos Colon
- Jesús Colón - writer and politician, known as the "father of the Nuyorican Movement"
- Michelle Marie Colón - first black woman to compete in Miss Universe beauty pageant as Miss Puerto Rico
- Willie Colon - NFL player
- Willie Colón - salsa musician
- Celestina Cordero - educator, established the first school for girls in San Juan
- Rafael Cordero - known as the "father of public education in Puerto Rico"; self-educated man who provided free schooling to children regardless of race. Brother of Celestina Cordero
- Ismael Cruz Córdova - actor, played Mando on Sesame Street
- Maritza Correia - first Afro–Puerto Rican to be on the USA Olympic swimming team; first black US swimmer to set an American and world swimming record
- Rafael Cortijo - percussionist, bandleader, plena artist, and composer
- Caitlin Cosme - soccer player
- Eva Cruz - volleyball player
- Víctor Cruz - NFL wide receiver for New York Giants
- Wilson Cruz - actor and advocate for gay youth of color
- Javier Culson - track and field runner, Olympic bronze medalist who specializes in the 400 metre hurdles
- Ariana DeBose - actress and singer
- Eddie Dee - reggaetón artist
- Neil Degrasse Tyson - astrophysicist
- Carlos Delgado - baseball player, Major League Baseball first baseman
- Rubén Díaz Sr. - politician
- Rubén Díaz Jr. - politician, former NYC borough president for the Bronx
- Iann Dior - rapper
- Gloria Douglas – soccer player
- Thomas Dulorme - professional boxer
- Nino Escalera - baseball player, first Hispanic in the Reds franchise
- Ángel Espada - boxer; the WBA's world Welterweight champion in 1975–76
- Jaime Espinal - professional wrestler
- Lucy Fabery - jazz singer, known as "La Muñeca de Chocolate"
- Antonio Fargas - actor, known for his roles in 1970s blaxploitation movies
- Justin Fargas - NFL running back, son of Afro Puerto Rican actor Antonio Fargas
- José "Cheo" Feliciano - New York-based composer and singer of "salsa" and bolero music
- Ruth Fernández - singer and actress; first Latina singer of romantic music to sing in the Scandinavian countries; first Latina to record with a North American band
- Dr. Loida Figueroa - historian, writer, educator, and one of the founders of the Puerto Rican Socialist Party’s Pro-Independence Movement (MPI)
- Rogelio Figueroa - engineer, politician, and president of the Puerto Ricans for Puerto Rico Party
- Pedro Flores - composer of ballads and boleros
- Destiny Nicole Frasqueri - rapper, known as Princess Nokia
- Kevin Gates - rapper
- Rubén Gómez - Major League Baseball right-handed starting pitcher; first Puerto Rican to pitch in a World Series game
- Reagan Gómez-Preston - actress
- Herbert Lewis Hardwick, aka "Cocoa Kid" - boxer; won the world colored welterweight and world colored middleweight championships; inducted into the International Boxing Hall of Fame in 2012
- Yvonne Harrison - track and field runner
- Joseline Hernandez - known as "The Puerto Rican Princess" - television reality star, rapper, actress.
- Juano Hernández - actor; first Afro–Puerto Rican to become a major star in the US and among the "new style" black screen actors, who played straight dramatic roles
- Keylla Hernández - television reporter, former co-anchor of the station's morning news show ″Noticentro al Amanecer″
- Rafael Hernández Marín - musician, bandleader, and composer; wrote, among thousands of other songs, Lamento Borincano
- Aideliz Hidalgo - first black woman to compete in Miss International beauty pageant as Miss Puerto Rico
- Homicide - professional wrestler formerly for TNA.
- Rafael Ithier - salsa musician and the principal founder of the highly successful orchestra El Gran Combo
- Reginald Martínez Jackson - Hall of Fame baseball player, known as "Mr. October"
- Esteban De Jesús - boxer, first to defeat Roberto Durán
- Miriam Jiménez Román - author, activist, and scholar
- Rafael José - actor, singer, television host
- Kako - musician
- Erick Kolthoff - Associate Justice of the Supreme Court of Puerto Rico
- Tato Laviera - poet
- Benjamín LaGuer - US soldier and convicted criminal
- Enrique A. Laguerre - novelist and newspaper columnist; "La llamarada" is considered to be his most important novel
- Alfred Lee - basketball player, first Puerto Rican to play in NBA and to win an NBA championship as a member of the 79-80 Los Angeles Lakers
- Isabel la Negra - known as "la Negra"; madame of a brothel
- Ryan López - soccer player
- Felipe Luciano - poet, radio personality, and pro-independence activist
- Young M.A - American hip hop artist
- Eddie Manso - politician, former mayor of Loíza and member of the New Progressive Party of Puerto Rico
- Jan Mateo - soccer player
- Sonia Manzano - actress
- Bruno Mars - singer and songwriter
- Alpo Martínez - convicted criminal, previously known as "Mayor of Harlem"
- Maxwell - singer
- Syesha Mercado - singer
- Rogelio Mills - television host
- Jerome Mincy - basketball player
- Bryant Myers - rapper
- Rico Nasty - rapper
- Emilio "Millito" Navarro - baseball player; first Puerto Rican to play baseball in the Negro leagues
- N.O.R.E. - rapper
- Osvaldo "Ossie" Ocasio - boxer
- Denise Oliver-Vélez - activist, community organizer, professor, feminist, and former member of the Young Lords and the Black Panther Party
- Don Omar - reggaetón artist
- Fres Oquendo - professional heavyweight boxer
- Anita Ortega - former athlete; UCLA, LAPD, Western States Police and Fire Games and Los Angeles City Section Halls of Fame
- Claudette Ortiz - model and R&B singer
- Joell Ortiz - rapper
- Ortiz - wrestler
- Ozuna - reggaetón artist
- Edwin Pellot - retired basketball player
- Víctor Pellot - baseball player; second black Puerto Rican to play in Major League Baseball; first Puerto Rican to play in the American League
- Willie Perdomo - poet, writer
- Mikey Perfecto - reggaetón artist
- Myke Towers - rapper and singer
- Miguel José Pérez Sr. - former wrestler, best known for 1/2 of the Tag Team with Antonio Rocca and World Wrestling Council
- Miguel José Pérez Jr. - current WWE wrestler, son of Miguel José Pérez Sr.
- Gabriel "Lennox" Pizarro - reggaetón artist, member of the duo 'Zion y Lennox'
- Reagan Gomez-Preston - American television film and voice actress
- Tito Puente - singer
- Robert Quinn - NFL football player
- Adolfo Quiñones - actor, dancer, and choreographer
- Ivy Queen - reggaetón artist
- Adolfo "OG Black" Ramírez - reggaetón artist, member of the duo "Master Joe & OG Black"
- Ernesto Ramos Antonini - President of the House of Representatives of Puerto Rico and co-founder of the "Partido Popular Democrático de Puerto Rico" (Popular Democratic Party of Puerto Rico)
- Heliot Ramos - professional baseball player
- Henry Ramos - professional baseball player
- Héctor Ramos - soccer player
- Gina Ravera - actress
- Gabriela Rose Reagan - former actress, and daughter of Sonia Manzano
- Carmen Belén Richardson - actress and comedian; pioneer of Puerto Rican television
- Vanessa del Río - adult film actress
- Christopher Lee Rios Jr. - rapper, son of Big Pun
- Ismael Rivera - salsa artist and singer
- Lance Rivera - film director, film producer and record executive
- Mon Rivera - musician
- Naya Rivera - singer and actress
- Victor Rivera -wrestler
- Aida Rodríguez - comedian, actress
- Gloria Rodríguez - rapper, known as "Hurricane G"
- Johnny Rodríguez - wrestler
- Pete "El Conde" Rodríguez - salsa singer
- Pedro Rosa Nales - journalist, news anchor/reporter; has received over 200 awards
- Zoe Saldaña - actress
- Mike Santana - wrestler
- O. J. Santiago - NFL football player, tight end
- Manny Santiago - skateboarder
- Víctor Santiago Jr. - rapper, known by the stage name "N.O.R.E."
- Rubén Santiago-Hudson - actor and playwright, born and residing in the US
- Mayra Santos-Febres - writer, poet, essayist, screenwriter, and college professor
- Arturo Alfonso Schomburg - historian, writer and pro-Puerto Rican independence activist in New York City; researched and raised awareness of Afro-Latin American and African American history and contributions
- Brandon Servania - soccer player
- Jaden Servania - soccer player
- Rafael "Lito" Sierra - reggaetón artist, member of duo "Lito y Polaco"
- Rubén Sierra - former Major League Baseball player
- Tasha Steelz - professional wrestler
- Pedro Telemaco - first black actor featured as leading man in a Puerto Rican telenovela
- Piri Thomas - writer, author of Down These Mean Streets
- Georgie Torres - basketball player, played for the BSN league of Puerto Rico; holds scoring record
- José "Chegüi" Torres - boxer, light heavyweight champion; inducted into the Boxing Hall of Fame
- Ritchie Torres – U.S. representative for New York's 15th congressional district
- Félix "Tito" Trinidad - professional boxer, world boxing champion
- Marcelo Trujillo - politician, former mayor of Humacao and member of the Popular Democratic Party of Puerto Rico
- Rafael Tufiño - painter and printmaker, known locally as the "Painter of the People"
- JLo Varada - soccer player
- Daniel "Divino" Velázquez - reggaetón artist
- Idelys Vázquez – soccer player
- Lauren Vélez - actress
- Loraine Vélez - actress
- Savio Vega - former WWE wrestler
- Zelina Vega - WWE wrestler
- Juan Evangelista Venegas - boxer; first Puerto Rican to win an Olympic medal
- Christina Vidal - actress
- Lisa Vidal - actress
- Sylvia del Villard - actress, dancer, choreographer and political activist
- Otilio "Bizcocho" Warrington - comedian and actor, best known for roles of "Bizcocho" and "Cuca Gómez"
- Bernie Williams - former Major League Baseball outfielder; professional jazz musician
- Marcos Xiorro - slave; in 1821, planned and conspired to lead a slave revolt against the sugar plantation owners and the Spanish Colonial government in Puerto Rico
- Pedro Zayas - rapper and former member of State Property, known as "Peedi Crakk"

== See also ==
- List of Puerto Ricans
- Afro-Latin American - Central and South America
- Black Hispanic and Latino Americans - United States of America
- List of topics related to Black and African people
