= Unchained Memories =

- DVD cover
- Directed by: Ed Bell and Thomas Lennon
- Written by: Mark Jonathan Harris
- Narrated by: Whoopi Goldberg
- Distributed by: HBO
- Release date: 2003
- Running time: 75 minutes
- Country: United States
- Language: English

Unchained Memories: Readings from the Slave Narratives is a 2003 American documentary film about the stories of former slaves interviewed during the 1930s as part of the Federal Writers' Project and preserved in the WPA Slave Narrative Collection. This HBO film interpretation directed by Ed Bell and Thomas Lennon is a compilation of slave narratives, narrated by actors, emulating the original conversation with the interviewer. The slave narratives may be the most accurate in terms of the everyday activities of the enslaved, serving as personal memoirs of more than two thousand former slaves. The documentary depicts the emotions of the slaves and what they endured. The "Master" had the opportunity to sell, trade, or kill the enslaved, for retribution should one slave not obey.

== History ==
The largest collection of slave narratives emerged from the Federal Writers' Project. Created by the Federal Government under the WPA to reduce unemployment during the 1930s, one component of the Federal Writers' Project involved interviews with thousands of former slaves in 17 states. The oral history interview project yielded an extraordinary set of 2,300 autobiographical documents known as the Slave Narrative Collection. What emerged from these documents were pictures of living standards, the daily chores, and long days, along with stories of the good and bad "Master." The brutality, torture, and abuse under slavery are themes in the interviews.

After the American Civil War ended in 1865, more than four million slaves were set free. The main objectives were to inform the public and describe the history and life of the former slaves. More than 2,000 slave narratives along with 500 photos are available online at the Library of Congress as part of the "Born in Slavery" project.

== Slaves and readers ==
- James Green, Texas, Volume 16 – read by Samuel L. Jackson 0:08 – last time I ever ... see her
- Narrated by: Whoopi Goldberg 1:30
- Sarah Gudger, North Carolina, Volume 11 – read by LaTanya Richardson 4:21 – never know nothin' but work
- Charley Williams, Oklahoma, Volume 13 – read by Ruben Santiago-Hudson 6:40 – bells and horns
- Frances Black, Texas, Volume 16 – 8:18 – he bought you for to play with me
- Martin Jackson, Texas, Volume 16 - read by Robert Guillaume 8:35 – my new master was only two
- Henry Coleman, South Carolina, Volume 14 – read by Roscoe Lee Browne 9:39 peafowl fly-brushes
- Jennie Proctor, Texas, Volume 16 – read by Oprah Winfrey 10:40 – beaten over a biscuit
- Jenny Proctor, Texas, Volume 16 – 12:54 – Webster's old blue-back speller
- Elizabeth Sparks, Virginia, Volume 17 – read by Angela Bassett 14:30 – knit all day, some had gizzards instead of hearts
- Rosa Starke, South Carolina, Volume 14 – 15:28 – there was more classes amongst the slaves
- Cato Carter, Texas, Volume 16 – read by Roger Guenveur Smith 16:00 – I was one of their blood, I was one of the most dudish
- Mary Reynolds, Texas, Volume 16 – read by Angela Bassett 17:26 – we got the same daddy you has
- Rev. Ishrael Massie, Virginia – 18:26 – make slave get up and do as they say
- Fannie Berry, Virginia – read by CCH Pounder 19:02 – some slaves would be so beat up when they resisted
- Mary Estes Peters, Arkansas, Volume 2 – read by Jasmine Guy 19:48 – that's the way I came to be here
- Sarah Ashley, Texas, Volume 16 – read by LaTanya Richardson 21:36 – I always get my 300 pounds
- Charles Grandy, Virginia — read by Ruben Santiago-Hudson 23:00 – til the blood come
- Marshall Butler, Georgia, Volume 4 – read by Samuel L. Jackson
- William Colbert, Alabama, Volume 1 – read by Courtney B. Vance
- Katie Darling, Texas, Volume 16 – read by Jasmine Guy
- Vinnie Brunson, Texas, Volume 3 – read by Vanessa L. Williams
- Fannie Berry, read by CCH Pounder
- Jack & Rosa Maddox, Texas, Volume 7 – read by Ossie Davis and Ruby Dee
- Mary Reynolds, Texas, Volume 16 – read by Angela Bassett
- Louisa Adams, North Carolina, Volume 11 – read by LaTanya Richardson
- Octavia George, Oklahoma, Volume 13 –
- Sarah Ashley, Texas, Volume 17 –
- Charles Grandy, Virginia – read by Ruben Santiago-Hudson
- Shang Harris, Georgia, Volume 4 – read by Don Cheadle
- Beverly Jones, Virginia –
- Wash Wilson, Texas, Volume 16 –
- Mary Reynolds, Texas, Volume 16 –
- Marshall Butler, Georgia, Volume 4 – read by Samuel L. Jackson
- Fannie Berry, Virginia –
- Lucindy Lawrence Jurdon, Alabama, Volume 1 –
- Mary Reynolds, Texas, Volume 16 –
- Tempie Herndon Durham, North Carolina, Volume 11 – read by Vanessa L. Williams
- Rose Williams, Texas, Volume 16 –
- Sarah Frances Shaw Graves, Missouri, Volume 10 –
- Laura Clark, Alabama, Volume 1 – read by Oprah Winfrey
- W.L. Bost, North Carolina. Volume 11 – read by Ossie Davis
- Robert Falls, Tennessee, Volume 15 – read by Don Cheadle
- Cato Carter. Texas, Volume 16 – read by Roger Guenveur Smith
- Thomas Cole, Texas, Volume 16 – read by Ruben Santiago-Hudson
- Arnold Gragston, Florida, Volume 3 – read by Courtney B. Vance
- Mary Reynolds, Texas, Volume 16 –
- Arnold Gragston, Florida, Volume 3 – read by Courtney B. Vance
- Katie Row, Oklahoma, Volume 13 –
- Pvt. Spottswood Rice, Co A, 67th US Colored Infantry – read by Roscoe Lee Browne
- William Moore, Texas, Volume 16 – read by Samuel L. Jackson
- Katie Rowe, Oklahoma, Volume 13 –
- Wash Ingram, Texas, Volume 16 – read by Michael Boatman
- Robert Falls, Tennessee, Volume 15 – read by Don Cheadle

== See also ==
- List of films featuring slavery
