= Mayra Santos-Febres =

Puerto Rican poet

- Born: 1966 (age 59–60); Carolina, Puerto Rico
- Education: University of Puerto Rico (MA); Cornell University (Ph.D.)
- Writing career
- Notable works: Pez de Vidrio (translated to English as Urban Oracles), Sirena Selena vestida de pena
- Notable awards: Guggenheim Fellowship, long-listed for IMPAC Dublin Literary Award, Juan Rulfo Award, Letras de Oro
- Website: mayrasantosfebres.blogspot.com

Mayra Santos-Febres (born 1966 in Carolina) is a Puerto Rican author, poet, novelist, professor of literature, essayist, and literary critic and author of children's books. Her work focuses on themes of race, diaspora identity, female sexuality, gender fluidity, desire, and power. She is a cultural activist who helps to bring books to young readers and the less fortunate. Her writings have been translated into French, English, German, and Italian.

== Early life ==
Santos-Febres was born in 1966 to parents who were both schoolteachers. Her mother, Mariana Febres Falu was an Elementary School teacher of Spanish. Her father, Juan Santos Hernandez, was a high school teacher of Puerto Rican History. He was also a baseball player. Later, he became the Director of Sports and Recreation Department in the township of Carolina, Puerto Rico. Mayra Santos-Febres began writing at the age of five because her asthma did not permit her to "climb trees or ride bikes like the kids in the neighborhood." She states that her disability, combined with her educator parents' knack for keeping books in the house, catapulted her into the beginnings of her writing career. At the age of fifteen, after writing poetry for ten years, she was encouraged to take her writing seriously by Ivonn Sanavitis, the only female teacher who was not a nun at her Catholic school Colegio Lourdes, Puerto Rico.

== Education and academic work ==
Santos-Febres completed her undergraduate work at the University of Puerto Rico in 1991 and currently holds an M.A. and Ph.D. from Cornell University. She has been a visiting professor at Rutgers University, Harvard university and Cornell University as well as at Universidad Complutense de Madrid in Spain and Universidad del Valle in Cali, Colombia

== Career and literary work ==
While still an undergraduate at the University of Puerto Rico, Santos-Febres had her work published in magazines and journal reviews such as Casa de las Américas in Cuba, Página doce in Argentina, Revue Noire in France and Review: Latin American Literature and Arts, in New York. Santos-Febres acknowledged in El País the Puerto Rican narrators who influenced her career: “I come from a long tradition of women writers, Rosario Ferré, Giannina Braschi, Ana Lydia Vega." Mayra Santos-Febres got a bachelor's degree in Hispanic Studies, from the University of Puerto Rico which she graduated with high honors in 1987.

In 1991, Santos-Febres published her first two collections of poetry, Anamu y manigua and El orden escapado, to critical acclaim. In 1994, Santos-Febres won the Letras de Oro literary prize for her collection of short stories Pez de Vidrio. "Oso Blanco," a short story from this collection, also won the Juan Rulfo Prize in 1996. Pez de Vidrio (Urban Oracles) contains 15 short stories about the complicated relationships between sexuality, race, gender identity, social status, and political status in modern Caribbean society.

Santos-Febres' first novel was Sirena Selena vestida de pena (Spain: Grijalbo Mondadori, 2000) about a teenaged drag queen who works in the streets and sings boleros. A finalist for the 2001 Rómulo Gallego's Prize for the Novel, it won the PEN Club of Puerto Rico's prize for Best Novel. Random House Mondadori published her second novel, Cualquier miércoles soy tuya, in 2002. Cualquier Miercoles Soy Tuya (Any Wednesday I'm yours) was also translated in English and was published by Penguin Books in 2002. Her third novel, Nuestra Señora de las noche (Rayo/HarperCollins, 2008), was a finalist for the Premio Primavera Literary Award and won Puerto Rico's 2007 Premio Nacional de Literatura. Her other novels include Nuestra Señora de la Noche (Our Lady of the Night), Fe en disfraz (2009) and La amante de Gardel (2015).

Santos-Febres teaches at the University of Puerto Rico, Río Piedras Campus, where she specializes in African, Caribbean, and feminist literature. She also is the executive director of Festival de la Palabra in Puerto Rico. She also reviews books on Univision television and hosts the Radio Universidad show En su tinta (sources?). Currently she is the Principal Investigator for PRAFRO, the AfroDiasporic and Race Studies Program at the University of Puerto Rico, founded by the Mellon Foundation. She is also a member of SCORES, Kellog Foundation's Solidarity Council for Racial Equity.

== Awards and honours ==
- Award for poetry from Revista Tríptico in Puerto Rico 1991
- Award Letras de Oro 1994
- Award Juan Rulfo de cuentos 1996
- Award Rómulo Gallegos 2001
- Guggenheim Fellowship 2009
- long-listed for the IMPAC Dublin Literary Award

== Bibliography ==
- Anamu y manigua (1990)
- El orden escapado (1991)
- Pez de vidrio (1994) (Winner of the Juan Rulfo Award)
- El cuerpo correcto (1996)
- Urban Oracles (1997) (English translation of Pez de vidrio)
- Sirena Selena vestida de pena (2000) (translated as Sirena Selena, 2000)
- Tercer mundo (2000)
- Cualquier miércoles soy tuya (2002) (translated as Any Wednesday, I'm Yours, 2005)
- Sobre piel y papel (2005)
- Boat People (2005)
- Ernesto, El domador de los sueños (2008)
- Nuestra Señora de la Noche (2006) (translated as Our Lady of the Night, 2009)
- Fe en disfraz (2009)
- Tratado de Medicina Natural para Hombres Melancólicos (2011)
- El baile de mi vida (2013)
- Yo misma fui mi ruta: la maravillosa vida de Julia de Burgos (2014)
- La amante de Gardel (2015)
- Jadeante y sudorosa: crónicas sobre escribir y correr (2008-2015) (2016)
- Huracanada (2018)
- Antes que llegue la luz (2021)
- La otra Julia (2024)

== See also ==
- List of Puerto Rican writers
- List of Puerto Ricans
- List of Puerto Ricans of African descent
- Puerto Rican literature
