= Their Eyes Were Watching God =

1937 novel by Zora Neale Hurston

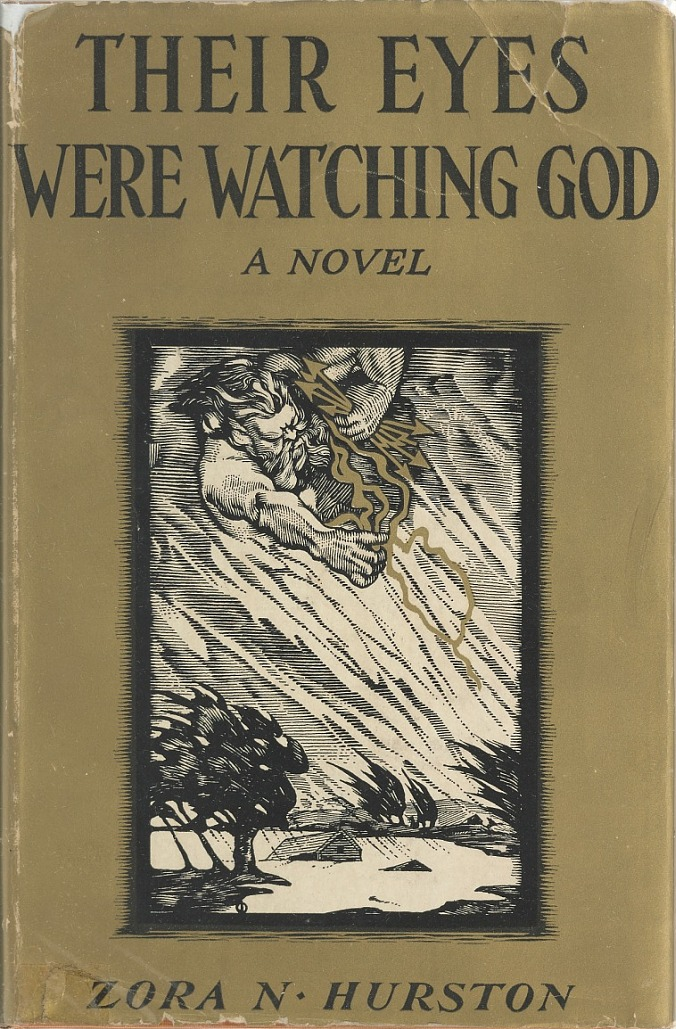
- First edition
- Author: Zora Neale Hurston
- Language: English
- Genre: Novel, psychological fiction, bildungsroman
- Set in: Florida, 1900s–30s
- Publisher: J. B. Lippincott
- Publication date: September 18, 1937
- Publication place: United States
- OCLC: 46429736
- Dewey Decimal: 813.52
- LC Class: PS3515 .U789 .T5
- Website: zoranealehurston.com

Their Eyes Were Watching God is a 1937 novel by American writer Zora Neale Hurston. It is considered a classic of the Harlem Renaissance and is also considered Hurston's best-known work. The novel explores protagonist Janie Crawford's "ripening from a vibrant, but voiceless, teenage girl into a woman with her finger on the trigger of her own destiny."

Hurston wrote Their Eyes Were Watching God in Haiti in the span of seven weeks. Hurston was self-described as "under internal pressure" when writing and wished she could "write it again". However, retrospectively, she later stated that the work captured "all the tenderness of [her] passion".

Set in central and southern Florida in the early 20th century, the novel was initially poorly received by the African-American community. After the publication of Alice Walker's article "In Search of Zora Neale Hurston" in Ms. magazine in 1975 and Robert Hemenway's publication of a biography of Hurston in 1980, Hurston was back in the literary realm. Since the late 20th century, Their Eyes Were Watching God has been regarded as influential to both African-American literature and women's literature. Time magazine included the novel in its 2005 list of the 100 best English-language novels published since 1923. Their Eyes Were Watching God has become a foundational text in high school and college courses across American literature, African American studies, and gender studies.

== Plot ==
Janie Crawford, an African-American woman in her forties, returns to her old town after a year-long absence and recounts her life story to her friend Phoeby.

Janie begins with her sexual awakening, comparing it to a blossoming pear tree kissed by bees in spring, that occurs when she allows a local boy, Johnny Taylor, to kiss her, which Janie's grandmother, Nanny, witnesses. Nanny, as a young enslaved woman, had been raped by her white owner and gave birth to a mixed-race daughter, whom she named Leafy. Though Nanny wanted a better life for her daughter, Leafy was raped by her school teacher and became pregnant with Janie. Shortly after Janie's birth, Leafy began to drink and stay out at night, eventually abandoning the baby and leaving Janie with Nanny.

Nanny, having transferred her hopes for stability and opportunity from Leafy to Janie, arranges for Janie to marry Logan Killicks, an older farmer looking for a wife. However, Killicks does not love Janie and wants only a domestic helper, rather than a lover or partner; he thinks she does not do enough around the farm and considers her ungrateful. When Janie speaks to Nanny about her desire for love, Nanny accuses Janie of being spoiled and dies soon after.

Disillusioned and lonely, Janie leaves Killicks and runs off with Joe "Jody" Starks, a glib man who takes her to the all-Black community of Eatonville, Florida. Starks arranges to buy more land, establishes a general store, and is soon elected mayor of the town. However, Janie soon realizes that Starks wants her as a trophy wife to reinforce his powerful position in town and to run the store, even forbidding her from taking part in the town's social life. During their twenty-year marriage, he treats her as his property to control and physically abuse. When Starks' kidney begins to fail, Janie says that he never knew her because he would not let her be free.

After Starks dies, Janie becomes financially independent through his estate. Though she is beset with suitors, including men of means, she turns them all down until she meets a young drifter and gambler named Vergible Woods, known as "Tea Cake.” He plays the guitar for her and treats her with kindness and respect. Janie is hesitant because she is older and wealthy, but she eventually falls in love with him and decides to run away with him to Jacksonville to marry. They move to Belle Glade, in the northern part of the Everglades region, where they find work planting and harvesting beans. While their relationship is volatile and sometimes violent, Janie finally has the loving marriage that she always wanted. Unfortunately, the area is hit by the 1928 Okeechobee hurricane. Tea Cake is bitten by a dog while saving Janie from drowning and develops rabies. He grows increasingly jealous and unpredictable. When he tries to shoot Janie with his pistol, she fatally shoots him with a rifle in self-defense. She is charged with murder.

At the trial, Tea Cake's black male friends show up to oppose her, but a group of local white women arrives to support Janie. After the all-white jury acquits Janie, she gives Tea Cake a lavish funeral. Tea Cake's friends forgive her, asking her to remain in the Everglades. However, she decides to return to Eatonville. As she expected, the residents gossip about her when she returns to town. The story ends where it started, as Janie finishes recounting her life to Phoeby.

== Themes ==
=== Gender roles ===
The novel explores traditional gender roles and the relationship between men and women. Nanny believes that Janie should marry a man not for love, but for "protection". Janie's first two husbands, Logan Killicks and Jody Starks, both believe Janie should be defined by her marriage to them. Both men want her to be domesticated and silent. Her speech, or silence, is defined by her physical locations, most often. For example, Starks forces her silence at the store, a public—and therefore, male space at the time. He says: "... Muh wife don't know nothin' bout no speech-makin'. Ah never married her for nothin' lak dat. She's ah woman[,] and her place is in de home." Janie is also forbidden from socializing with the townspeople on the porch. Tea Cake is Janie's last husband, who treats her as more of an equal than Killicks and Starks did, by talking to her and playing checkers with her.

Duke professor and Black feminist cultural critic, Mark Anthony Neal, writes that Tea Cake defies the heteronormative roles of his own masculinity and Janie's femininity in their relationship despite his domestic violence towards her. He writes: "Tea Cake reads as progressive in opposition to traditional gender politics within black communities and institutions and the larger society during the era." Throughout the novel, Janie struggles with her agency in relation to domineering male figures, even Tea Cake whom she chose to love.

=== Masculinity and femininity ===
Scholars argue that in Their Eyes Were Watching God the role of masculinity is portrayed through the subordination and objectification of women. In a reflection of post-slavery Florida, Black men are subordinate only to their white employers and adhere to white, patriarchal institutions of masculinity in which women are held in a positive social regard only if they are attractive, are married, or have attained financial security via previous marriages. Specifically, Black women face greater oppression, as their own struggle for independence was considered counter-productive to the greater fight for equality for Black Americans as a whole. Nanny explains this hierarchical structure early on to Janie when she says:

"Honey, de white man is de ruler of everything...white man throw down the load and tell de nigger man to pick it up. He picks it up because he has to, but he doesn't tote it. He hands it to his womenfolks."

In the book, men view women as an object to pursue, acquire, and control through courting, manipulation, and even physical force. Janie's journey for the discovery of her self-identity and independence is depicted through her pursuit of true love—her dream—through marriages to three different men. Each of the men she marries conforms in some way to gender norms of the day. The role of femininity is portrayed through the symbolism of property, mules, and elements in nature. Women in the book are considered a trophy prize for males, to simply look pretty and obey their husbands. The analogy of the mule and women is stated repetitively in the book. Janie's Nanny explained to Janie at a young age how African-American women were objectified as mules. "De nigger woman is de mule uh de world so far as Ah can see." Mules are typically bought and sold by farmers, usually to be used to work until exhaustion. Later in the book, Janie realizes that Nanny's warnings were true when she identifies with an abused mule in Eatonville. She sees herself as a working animal with no voice, there for the amusement of others and at the expense of her own free will. This identification is shown in the book when the townspeople are laughing at the mule that Jody had eventually bought and rescued (in an attempt to manipulate Janie). However, Janie does not laugh alongside the townspeople as she is shown to empathize with the mule ("Everybody was having fun at the mule-baiting. All but Janie") and she feels disgusted by the situation. The mule represents the feminine gender role in the story by which men suppress and degrade women who are stereotyped as unable to think for themselves and needing constant guidance from men. These stereotypes "become a chain on the American women, preventing them from developing individuality, and from pursuing their personal happiness" and ultimately what forces them to mold into their gender role.

==== Janie Crawford ====
Janie Crawford is the main character of Their Eyes Were Watching God. At the beginning of the story, she is described as naive, beautiful, and energetic. However, as the story progresses, Janie is constantly under the influence and pressure of gender norms within her romantic relationships. As she navigates each of her relationships with men, Janie ultimately loses her confidence and self-image, conforming to roles that the husbands want her to fill.

In Janie's first relationship, she was given as a wife by Nanny at an early age and was told that love may come with marriage but that it was not important. However, as time passed, Janie was unable to love Logan. "She began to cry. 'Ah wants things sweet wid mah marriage lak when you sit under a pear tree and think.'" As time passed on, Logan began forcing Janie to conform to a traditional lifestyle, telling her that he would buy a mule for her so that she could work. However, Janie was strong-minded and Logan made little progress on changing Janie. Janie raised her voice, but still she remained susceptible to suppression and abuse. "You ain't got no particular place. It's wherever Ah need yuh. Git a move on yuh, and dat quick."

Then, in Janie's second relationship, she left Logan Killicks in an attempt to pursue a better future with her new husband, Joe Starks. Joe was the mayor of Eatonville and achieved much wealth, placing Janie in a higher status than her peers, since she was "sleeping with authority, seating in a higher chair." Janie believed that her life would change for the better. However, she was confined in the roles of a housewife and was made to be Joe's prized possession. "The king's mule, and the king's pleasure is everything she is there for, nothing else."

In Janie's third and last relationship, she was able to experience true love, on her own terms, with her third husband Vergible "Tea Cake" Woods. Janie was older than Tea Cake by nearly twelve years. He loved and treated her better than her previous husbands, though while she was no longer strictly confined by the gender roles placed upon her by her previous husbands, she was still easily influenced and manipulated by Tea Cake. Janie was forced to shoot and kill Tea Cake in self-defense after he developed rabies.

==== Logan Killicks ====
Logan Killicks is Janie's first husband. Shortly after Nanny observes Janie sharing her first kiss with a boy named Johnny Taylor—and therefore showing signs of puberty—she informs Janie that she was promised to Logan Killicks, a widower, from a young age for her own well-being and protection. Logan owns a farm with 60 acres of land. He grows and sells potatoes as well as chops and delivers wood. He has one mule to plow the fields and decides that he needs to add another to the stable. Though Janie hopes that it will grow, there is never any gentleness or love between her and Logan. She is 15 or 16 years old when she is married off to Logan and later she grows to resent her grandmother for selling her off, like a slave. Their marriage is purely based on logic, work and convenience—he is a man with property and he needs a wife while Nanny is an aging woman raising her grandchild alone, and she needs to secure Janie's future. There is little regard for Janie's happiness as Nanny believes Logan to be a good husband based on his financial prospects alone.

Logan has traditional views on marriage. He believes that a man should be married to a woman, and that she should be his property and work hard. Everyone contributes to tending the family land. He believes Janie should work well from dawn to dusk, in the field as well as the house, and do as she is told. She is analogous to a mule or other working animal. He is not an attractive man by Janie's description of him and seems to be aware of this. As such, his prospects at finding a mate based on attraction and his age are slim, thus the reason for approaching Nanny early on about an arrangement of marriage to Janie when she comes of age.

During the course of their brief marriage, Logan attempts to subjugate Janie with his words and attempts to make her work beyond the gender roles in a typical marriage. He does not appreciate her streaks of independence when she refuses his commands and he uses her family history to try to manipulate her into being submissive to him. At one point, he threatens to kill her for her insubordination in a desperate and final attempt to control her.

==== Joe "Jody" Starks ====
Joe "Jody" Starks is Janie's second husband. He is charismatic, charming and has big plans for his future. Janie, being young and naive, is easily seduced by his efforts to convince her to leave Logan. Ultimately, Joe is successful in gaining Janie's trust and so she joins him on his journey. Joe views Janie as a princess or royalty to be displayed on a pedestal. Because of her youth, inexperience, and desire to find true love, Janie is easily controlled, and manipulated, into submitting to his male authority.

Joe Starks is a man who is strong, organized and a natural leader. He has money from his time working for white men and he now aims to settle in a new community made up of African-Americans, a place in its infancy where he can make a name for himself. Joe quickly establishes himself as an authoritative figure around the town which has no determined name or governance of any kind when he and Janie arrive. With the money he has, he buys land, organizes the townsfolk, becomes the owner-operator of the general store and post office, and is eventually named Mayor of Eatonville. Joe strives for equality with white men, particularly the mayor of the white town across the river from Eatonville. To attain this status he requires nice things: the largest white house, a nice desk and chair, a gilded spitoon, and a beautiful wife. He is a larger-than-life character and during their time in Eatonville, he has grown an equally large belly and taken up the habit of chewing nice cigars, both of which cement his status with the locals as an important man around town. Joe, like most of the men in the book, believes that women are incapable of thinking and caring for themselves. He likens them to children and livestock that need constant tending and direction. "Somebody's got to think for the women and chillen and chickens and cows. God, they sho don't think none fo themselves."

Jody is a jealous man, and because of this he grows more and more possessive and controlling of Janie. He expects her to dress a certain way (buying her the finest of clothes, with tight corsets) and requires that she wear her long, beautiful hair—symbolic of her free spirit and femininity—covered and up in a bun, so as not to attract too much unwanted attention from the other men in Eatonville. He considers her long hair to be for his enjoyment alone. He excludes Janie from various events and the social gatherings in Eatonville to further his dominance and control over her. He restricts her from being friendly with the other townswomen, requiring her to behave in a separate and superior manner.

==== Vergible "Tea Cake" Woods ====
Tea Cake is Janie's third and final husband. He is her ideal partner in her search for true love. He is charismatic, charming, sharp-witted, and creative with a penchant for embellished stories. To Janie, he is larger than life, wise, and genuinely caring. Tea Cake is loving towards Janie and respectful of her as an autonomous individual. Unlike in her previous two marriages, Tea Cake never stops trying to make Janie happy. He is more than willing to share with her what he has learned from his own experiences and show her the greater world outside of her own existence. He enjoys being with Janie and playing the role of a teacher. Through Tea Cake, Janie learns to shoot a rifle, play checkers, fish, and hunt alligator, among other activities.

However, Tea Cake shows tendencies of patriarchal dominance and psychological abuse towards Janie, somewhat like in her previous two marriages. He is not always truthful with her—in a show of male dominance in their relationship, Tea Cake takes $200 from Janie without her knowledge or permission and spends it on a guitar and a lavish party with others around town without including her in the festivities. While accounting for his spending of her money, he tells Janie that he had to pay women that he deemed unattractive $2 each to keep them from the party. He then gambles the remaining amount to make the money back, telling her to put it in the bank and to only rely off of him and whatever money he could make. What differentiates Tea Cake from Joe in this regard is that Janie regularly confronts him and he acquiesces to her demand that she not be excluded from aspects of his life.

Another tendency that Tea Cake shares with Joe is his jealousy and need to maintain some amount of control over Janie. When he overhears another woman, Mrs. Turner, speaking poorly to Janie about Tea Cake and attempting to set her up with her brother, Tea Cake decides to take matters into his own hands. He initially discusses it with Janie, but when Mrs. Turner's brother actually comes to town, he slaps his wife around in front of Mrs. Turner and others to show them that he is in charge and to assert his ownership over her. He ends up successfully executing an elaborate plan to ruin her establishment.

In the end, Tea Cake plays the role of hero to Janie when he saves her from drowning and being attacked by a rabid dog. Tea Cake himself is bitten and eventually succumbs to the disease. Not able to think rationally and enraged with jealousy, he physically attacks Janie, who is forced to shoot and kill Tea Cake.

=== Liberated woman ===
Janie is constantly searching for her own voice and identity throughout the novel. She is often without a voice in relation to her husbands as she will not fight back. Janie also encounters situations that make her feel that her value as an African-American woman is little to none. She is seen as distinct from other women in the novel, who follow traditions and do not find a life independent of men. Janie's physical appeal becomes a basis for Starks and Tea Cake to have jealousy and belittle her looks. Starks orders Janie to cover her long hair as other men are attracted to it. Similarly, Tea Cake remarks on Janie's lighter skin and her appeal to Mrs. Turner's brother. But Janie begins to feel liberated in her marriage with Tea Cake because he treats her as an equal and mostly does not look down on her. As a result, she loves him more than she did her other two spouses.

Janie does not find complete independence as a woman until after Tea Cake's death. She returns to Eatonville with her hair down, and she sits on her own porch chatting with her friend Pheoby. By the end of the novel, she has overcome traditional roles and cultivates an image of the "liberated black woman."

==== Liberation from racial history ====
Janie grew up under the care of her grandmother, Nanny. Nanny's experiences as a slave and freedwoman shaped the way Nanny saw the world. She hoped to protect Janie, by forcing her to marry Logan Killicks, although he was older and she was not attracted to him. Janie followed her grandmother's advice but found that it would not be as easy to love him as Nanny had suggested. African Americans believed in marriage during the early 20th century because they had been prevented from such legal protection under slavery. Unhappy in her marriage to Logan, Janie runs off with Starks and commits bigamy. After the death of Starks, Janie meets Tea Cake and they fall in love. Her community thought he was a broke nobody and was suspicious of him. Tea Cake was not the perfect man, but he was better than the community of Eatonville had expected him to be.

Janie’s journey is not only about love and self-discovery but also about liberating herself from the racial history that shaped the lives of the women before her. Her grandmother, Nanny, who was born into slavery, sees the world through a rigid racial and social hierarchy. In "Seeking Confirmation of the Voice and Vision: The Struggle for Janie’s Soul in Their Eyes Were Watching God,” Luella Putnam states, “Nanny sees the world demarcated in terms of power, race, and gender. She explicitly defines for Janie the hierarchy of the world as she sees it: white man, white woman, Black man, and then, finally, Black woman (5). This hierarchy influences her belief that security and survival matter more than love, causing her to transfer her fears onto Janie. Nanny’s insistence that Janie marry Logan Killicks comes from a traumatic past where marriage was seen as protection, a legacy rooted in the dehumanization of slavery. However, Janie comes to resent this mindset: “She hated her grandmother and had hidden it from herself all these years under a cloak of pity” (Hurston 89). By confronting the generational expectations and internalized racial limitations passed down to her, Janie begins to liberate herself from this inherited burden. Putnam emphasizes that although Janie internalized Nanny’s worldview early on, she eventually grows beyond it, realizing “though her relationships with those around her (and the races and classes they represent) have served to shape her, she no longer needs them to define herself” (Putnam 18). Through this process, Janie breaks free from the racialized gender roles imposed on her and embraces a self-defined life. Her return to Eatonville is not a retreat, but a powerful homecoming as a Black woman who has survived, resisted, and redefined what freedom means beyond the constraints of history.

==== Liberation from domestic violence ====
During the early 20th century, the African-American community asked African-American women to set aside self-realization and self-affirmation values. They imposed male-dominated values and often controlled who women married. Janie suffered domestic violence in her marriages with Joe Starks and Tea Cake. Starks initially seemed to be good for Janie, but later beat her several times, in an effort to exert his authority over her. Despite her husband's physical and emotional abuse, Janie did not complain, behavior that was approved by the townsmen. Domestic abuse was not entirely disapproved by the African-American community, and men thought it was acceptable to control their women this way. After Starks's death, Janie was freed from his abuse. Tea Cake was kinder to her and respected her, but he was occasionally abusive toward her, such as when he beat her in order to show his dominance when another man seemed to make a pass at Janie. As a result, it is only after Tea Cake's death that she is fully liberated from the threat of domestic violence.

==== Liberation from sexual norms ====
The early 1900s was a time in which patriarchal ideals were accepted and seen as the norm. Throughout the novel, Janie on multiple occasions suffers from these ideals. In her relationships, she is being ordered around by her husbands, but she did not question it, whether in the kitchen or bedroom. Janie in many ways expresses her growing distance from the sexual and social norms of her time. After the death of Starks, Janie goes to his funeral wearing black and formal clothes. But for Tea Cake's funeral, she wears workers' blue overalls, showing that she cared less about what society thought of her as she got older. In addition, critics say that Tea Cake was the vehicle for Janie's liberation. She went from working in the kitchen and indoors to working more "manly" jobs, such as helping in the fields, fishing, and hunting. Tea Cake offered her a partnership; he didn't see her as an object to be controlled and possessed through marriage.

=== Value of women in a relationship ===
Throughout the novel, Hurston vividly displays how African-American women are valued, or devalued, in their marital relationships. By doing so, she takes the reader on a journey through Janie's life and her marriages. Janie formed her initial idea of marriage off the beautiful image of unity she witnessed between a pear tree and a bee. This image and expectation sets Janie up for disappointment when it comes time to marry. From her marriage to Logan Killicks to Tea Cake, Janie was forced to acknowledge where she stood as a powerless female in her relationships.

Starting with her marriage to Logan, Janie was put in a place where she was expected to prove her value with hard work. On top of all the physical labor expected from her, Janie endured constant insults and physical beatings from her male counterparts. Hoping for more value, Janie decides to leave Logan and run off with Joe Starks. However, in reaction to this decision, she's only faced with more beating and c. Joe expected her stay in the home, work in the kitchen, and when she was in public, Janie was expected to cover her hair and avoid conversation with the locals. With one last hope, Janie engaged in a marriage with Tea Cake, a younger man, and things finally seemed to look up for her even though she was still expected to help in the fields and tend to her womanly duties. Overall, throughout her marriages, Janie experienced the hardships that most African-American women went through at that time. From the physical labor to the physical beatings, Janie was presented with the life that a woman was expected to live.

Janie was able to feel like a woman in her third marriage with Tea Cake. In her first marriage, to Logan, she was being controlled by her husband. She didn't feel like a woman in her first marriage. She didn't feel any love or affection either. In her second marriage to Jody, she was able to experience independence as a woman. With Jody's death, she became in charge of the store and his property. She was able to experience freedom and an economic stable life. She learned about ownership, self-determination, self ruling, and home-ruling. In her last marriage to Tea Cake, Janie experienced true love. But she also learned who she was as an African-American woman. Throughout her marriages she learned how to value herself as a woman, an African-American woman, and a hard-working woman.

The novel is written in dialect and colloquial language that expresses it as a story of a Black woman from the southern United States. Throughout the novel, Janie serves as both protagonist and occasional narrator, detailing the events of her life, her three marriages, and the aftermath of each, which eventually lead to her return to Eatonville. This is done with two contrasting writing styles, one in standard English prose where the narration is done in the third person and the other making use of Black Southern vernacular in dialogue. Having a voice and being able to speak out is a prevalent theme throughout the novel. During her first two marriages to Logan Killicks and Joe Starks, Janie is subjugated and held under their rule, the former comparing her to another mule to work his field and the latter keeping her in a powerless position of domesticity. Throughout both marriages she finds herself without the ability to speak out or to express herself, and when she tries she is usually shut down. This leaves her feeling like a "rut in the road," the isolation taking its toll until she finally confronts Joe and attacks his ego with a verbal assault against his manhood. This leaves Joe resenting Janie and in effect destroys what is left of their marriage. When Janie marries Tea Cake, we see how language affects the way Janie begins to feel about herself. The way Tea Cake speaks to her allows her to find the freedom in her own voice and to begin to learn how to use it. We are able to see how language helps Janie grow as a person once she learns that her voice is her power.

=== Race ===
While the novel is written about Black people in the South, it is not primarily a book about a racist society. Nanny is the first character to discuss the effects of slavery. "Ah was born back due in slavery so it wasn't for me to fulfil my dreams of whut a woman oughta be and to do. Dat's one of de hold-backs of slavery." The novel is mostly concerned with differences within the Black community. Starks is compared to the master of a plantation, as he has a huge house in the centre of the town. "The rest of town looked like servants' quarters surrounding the 'big house'. Starks becomes a figure of authority because he has money and is determined to create the first Black town. But his plans seem to result in a town where people impose their own hierarchy. "Us talks about de white man keepin' us down! Shucks! He don't have tuh. Us keeps our own selves down." When Janie marries Tea Cake and moves to the Everglades, she becomes friendly with Mrs. Turner. This woman compliments Janie on her light skin and European features from her mixed-race ancestry. Turner disapproves of her marriage to Tea Cake, as he is darker skinned and more "African" looking.

== Inspirations and influences ==
Perhaps the strongest inspiration for Hurston's writing of Their Eyes Were Watching God was her former lover Percival Punter. Hurston writes in her autobiography that the romance between Janie and Tea Cake was inspired by a tumultuous love affair. She described falling in love with the man as "a parachute jump". Like Janie in the novel, Hurston was significantly older than her lover. Like Jody, Punter was sexually dominant and sometimes violent. Hurston wrote Their Eyes Were Watching God three weeks after the tumultuous conclusion of her relationship with Punter. She wrote in her autobiography that she had "tried to embalm all the tenderness of [her] passion for him." With this emotional inspiration, Hurston went on to paint the picture of Their Eyes Were Watching God using her personal experience and research as a template.

In 1927, a decade before writing Their Eyes Were Watching God, Hurston traveled south to collect folk songs and folk tales through an anthropological research fellowship arranged by her Barnard College mentor Franz Boas. The all-Black Eatonville of Their Eyes Were Watching God is based on the all-Black town of the same name in which Hurston grew up. The town's weekly announced in 1889, "Colored People of the United States: Solve the great race problem by securing a home in Eatonville, Florida, a Negro city governed by negroes." The hurricane that symbolizes the climax of Hurston's story also has an historical inspiration: in 1928, "a hurricane ravaged both coastal and inland areas of Florida, bringing torrential rains that broke the dikes of Lake Okeechobee near Belle Glade". Scholars of the African diaspora note the cultural practices common to the Caribbean, Africa, and the United States in Their Eyes Were Watching God.

Hurston wrote Their Eyes Were Watching God while living in Belle Glade, at the home of Harvey Poole, who, as manager of one of the local labor camps, informed her tremendously about bean picking and the labors of African Americans on the muckland. The book was also written while on a Guggenheim Fellowship in Haiti to research Obeah practices in the West Indies. Haiti provided major influences through Vodou traditions and symbols for empowering African American women. As the religion of slaves, Vodou provided faith and represented political rebellion. Hurston tapped into the Vodou pantheon and rituals, for representing her characters. Some scholar focus on the Vodou references in her works, where her characters represent incarnations of the gods.

== Reception ==
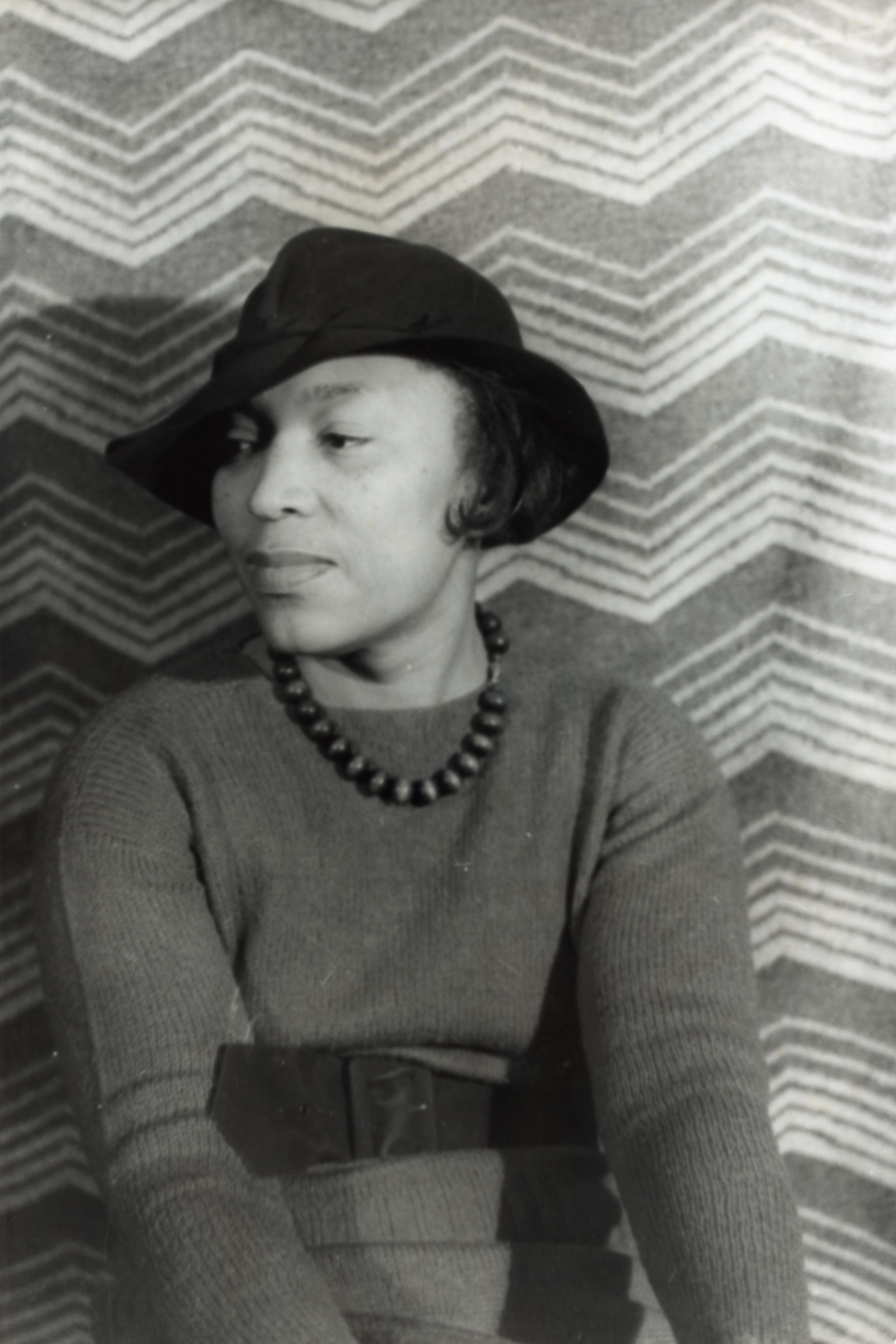
Hurston in 1938 (Carl Van Vechten, gelatin silver print)

=== Initial reception ===
Hurston's political views in Their Eyes Were Watching God were met with resistance from several leading Harlem Renaissance authors.

Novelist and essayist Richard Wright condemned Their Eyes Were Watching God, writing in a review for New Masses (1937):

Miss Hurston seems to have no desire whatsoever to move in the direction of serious fiction… [She] can write; but her prose is cloaked in that facile sensuality that has dogged Negro expression since the days of Phyllis Wheatley... Her characters eat and laugh and cry and work and kill; they swing like a pendulum eternally in that safe and narrow orbit in which America likes to see the Negro live: between laughter and tears.

Ralph Ellison said the book contained a "blight of calculated burlesque."

Alain Locke wrote in a review: "when will the Negro novelist of maturity, who knows how to tell a story convincingly—which is Miss Hurston's cradle gift, come to grips with motive fiction and social document fiction?"

The New Republic's Otis Ferguson wrote: "it isn't that this novel is bad, but that it deserves to be better". But he went on to praise the work for depicting "Negro life in its naturally creative and unselfconscious grace".

Not all African-American critics had negative things to say about Hurston's work. Carter G. Woodson, founder of The Journal of Negro History wrote, "Their Eyes Were Watching God is a gripping story... the author deserves great praise for the skill and effectiveness shown in the writing of this book." The critic noted Hurston's anthropological approach to writing, "She studied them until she thoroughly understood the working of their minds, learned to speak their language".

Meanwhile, reviews of Hurston's book in the mainstream white press were largely positive, although they did not translate into significant retail sales. Writing for The New York Times, Ralph Thompson states:

[T]he normal life of Negroes in the South today—the life with its holdovers from slave times, its social difficulties, childish excitements, and endless exuberances... compared to this sort of story, the ordinary narratives of Negroes in Harlem or Birmingham seem ordinary indeed."

For the New York Herald Tribune, Sheila Hibben described Hurston as writing "with her head as with her heart" creating a "warm, vibrant touch". She praised Their Eyes Were Watching God as filled with "a flashing, gleaming riot of black people, with a limitless sense of humor, and a wild, strange sadness".

New York Times critic Lucille Tompkins described Their Eyes Were Watching God: "It is about Negroes... but really it is about every one, or at least every one who isn't so civilized that he has lost the capacity for glory."

=== Rediscovery ===
As universities across the country developed Black Studies programs in the 1970s and 1980s, they created greater space for Black literature in academia. Several prominent academics, including Henry Louis Gates Jr. and Addison Gayle Jr., established a new "Black Aesthetic" that "placed the sources of contemporary Black literature and culture in the communal music and oral folk tradition". This new respect coupled with a growing Black feminism led by Mary Helen Washington, Audre Lorde, Alice Walker, and others, would create the space for the rediscovery of Hurston.

Hurston first achieved a level of mainstream institutional support in the 1970s. Walker published an essay, "Looking for Zora," in Ms. magazine in 1975. In that work, she described how the Black community's general rejection of Hurston was like "throwing away a genius". The National Endowment for the Humanities went on to award Robert Hemenway two grants for his work to write Hurston's biography. The 1977 biography was followed in 1978 by the re-issue of Their Eyes Were Watching God.

In 1975, the Modern Language Association held a special seminar focusing on Hurston. In 1981, professor Ruth Sheffey of Baltimore's Morgan State University founded the Zora Neale Hurston Society. Hurston had attended the school, then known as Morgan Academy, in 1917.

In 1978, Harper and Row leased its rights to Their Eyes Were Watching God to the University of Illinois Press. However, the printing was so profitable that Harper and Row refused to renew the leasing contract and instead reprinted its own new edition. This new edition sold its total print of 75,000 in less than a month.

In The New York Times, Virginia Heffernan explains that the book's "narrative technique, which is heavy on free indirect discourse, lent itself to poststructuralist analysis". With so many new disciplines especially open to the themes and content of Hurston's work, Their Eyes Were Watching God achieved growing prominence in the last several decades. It is now firmly established in the literary canon.

On November 5, 2019, the BBC News included Their Eyes Were Watching God on its list of the 100 most influential novels.

== Critical analysis ==
- In Maria J. Johnson's article "'The World in a Jug and the Stopper in [Her] Hand': Their Eyes Were Watching God as Blues Performance", she states that Hurston's novel takes a similar structure and aesthetic to blues culture. Johnson also shows how the contrast of Hurston's images, such as the pleasure and pain dynamic of the bee, can be seen in songs by singers like Bessie Smith.
- The article "The Cognitive Construction of the Self in Hurston's Their Eyes Were Watching God", by Patrick S. Bernard, highlights the connection between the construction of self and cognition in Hurston's novel. According to Bernard, cognition is the inner essence of an individual that embodies the idea of "thinking, seeing, speaking, and knowing", but is often determined by one's exterior environment. Janie, the protagonist, uses her cognitive skills to find her identity and throughout the novel develops her cognition further. While Janie is living in a sexist society, she continues to rise above her opposition, specifically that of her three husbands. Bernard demonstrates that:

In a conversation with Jody, Janie defends 'womenfolk,' disagreeing with the sexist claim that God made men "different" because they turn "out so smart" (70). When she states that men "don't know half as much as you think you do," Jody interrupts her saying, 'you getting too moufy Janie... Go fetch me de checker-board and de checkers' (70–71) so that he and the other men could play (Bernard 9).

The comment from Jody, Janie's second husband, attempts to suppress her voice and manipulate her thoughts. Rather than acting submissive to Jody, Janie for a brief moment contends with Jody by telling him how men misunderstand women. Jody fears that Janie's thinking will lead to her gaining more knowledge and naturally to speaking her mind, eventually leading to Janie achieving the power of knowledge to recognize and change the mistreatment and unfairness she has been receiving. Bernard proposes the idea that Jody's relationship with Janie represents society's assumption that women are of limited cognition. This assumption positions women in subservient roles that limit their ways of thinking, speaking, and seeing.

In addition to bringing up Janie's relationship with Jody, Bernard emphasizes how her relationships with her other husbands influenced her cognition. He points out the fact that Logan Killicks, Janie's first husband, mistreated her by severing any beginning form of self-construction by treating her as an infant. Bernard also brings forth the idea that Janie's construction of selfhood blossoms when Tea Cake, her third husband, allows her to participate in experiences unimaginable to her. While Logan Killicks gives her no opportunity of expressing herself, Jody overpowers her expressive voice; Tea Cake allows her construction of self to mature link between self construction and cognition. Bernard's main point therefore is that self-construction is influenced by cognition, that is, knowing, thinking, seeing and speaking are important to the construction of self in Zora Neale Hurston's novel.

- In "The Hierarchy Itself: Hurston's Their Eyes Were Watching God and the Sacrifice of Narrative Authority," Ryan Simmons argues that Hurston made a statement against models of authority that supplant an oppressive system with other oppressive systems and offered an alternative. By models of authority, he means the narrative voice of the author and Janie's narrative voice. Hurston represented the different ideologies of Booker T. Washington and W. E. B. Du Bois through the characters of Logan Killicks and Joe ("Jody") Starks. Like Washington, Logan models the path of "gradual progress" that would not threaten the white-dominated sphere of power and Hurston presents his practices as a tradeoff between liberty and modest prosperity. Joe models the path advocated by Du Bois, which is one of assertion of dignity and less compromise. However, the issue shown by Joe's eventual isolation from the community dialogue he helped establish and Janie's overpowering of him through a usurpation of authority, Hurston shows that the weakness with Joe's approach is that it mirrors that of white suppression.

Instead, Hurston introduces a third way of achieving self-autonomy through Tea Cake. He represents an independence from reliance on communal validation, and instead serves as a mirror for Janie to discover her narrative power. In relation to the author's narrative power, Tea Cake is the epitome of a good reader, one that is receptive to the transformative message of the text. Language is the understanding and sharpening of one's identity while communication comes second. In Hurston's innovative narrative, she is attempting to fulfill the "ideal narrative", which is one that nurtures and changes both the reader and the author.

- In the article "'The Kiss of Memory': The Problem of Love in Hurston's Their Eyes Were Watching God", author Tracy L. Bealer argues that Janie's quest for her ideal form of love, as symbolized by the pear tree in bloom, is impossible within her existing sociohistorical environment. The forces of racial and patriarchal hierarchies lead Tea Cake, who generally treats Janie as his intellectual and communal equal, to beat her in order to display his dominance to their peers. Bealer asserts that the novel's depiction of Tea Cake, abuse and all, is intentionally ambivalent in order to simultaneously promote intersubjective love and to indict racism and sexism.
- William M. Ramsey, in his article "The compelling ambivalence of Zora Neale Hurston's Their Eyes Were Watching God", posits that the novel stands as an unfinished and unrealized work. He backs this claim by noting the short amount of time Hurston spent writing as well as statements made by Hurston in her autobiography. Ramsey also note how the numerous contradictions inherent in the novel (Tea Cake's treatment of Janie, Janie's idealization of Tea Cake, Janie's expectations of a utopian "pear tree" marriage, etc.) have led to wildly different interpretations and ultimately, a richly ambivalent text.

He also suggests that Tea Cake's death is "Hurston's vicarious revenge on Arthur Price", a former lover that Hurston left to pursue a research fellowship in the Caribbean.

- In the article "Naming and Power in Zora Neale Hurston's Their Eyes Were Watching God", Sigrid King comments that "Naming has always been an important issue in the Afro-American tradition because of its link to the exercise of power." Their names are a form of power. King also says that "Nanny teaches Janie the same lessons she learned about naming: Names are bound within the white male power structure, and the most a black woman can hope for is to endure within them". Nanny tells Janie that names are powerful and are used to take power away from people, and in the book, we see that Nanny's name is her role in society and not an actual name. Hurston is aware of the power that names have and she chooses to have Janie start off the book without having a name.
- In the article "Racial and sexual politics of Their Eyes are Watching God from a spatial perspective", Lihua Zhao argues that Janie is a victim of racism and gender sexism which leads to her poor character attributes in a lead Black female novel. Zhao comments on the novel saying "Janie's determined and consistent ignorance of racial spatial division implies her weak black identification, the horrible damage done by racism. Her vague and brief feminist consciousness suggests the brainwash of patriarchy is so successful that it is very hard to eliminate." Zhao states that in order to bring attention to a social political issue, we must first expose the problem in a meaningful manner like how Hurston has in her novel.
- In the article "Mules and women: identify and rebel—Janie's identity quest in 'Their Eyes Were Watching God'", Hongzhi Wu explores the symbolism of the mule in Hurston's novel claiming that it provides a deeper meaning of the external issues of racism. Wu states: "In all these animal talks they expressed their hatred of the abuses and exploitation from the white world; their despise of their white master's ignorance and viciousness; their acclamation of the black people's industriousness and intelligence; and they also expressed their hope of salvation." The mule acts as a metaphor for the exploitation and mistreatment of the Black community by the white superiority race.

== Adaptations for theater, film and radio ==
- In 1983, the graduate repertory Hilberry Theater at Wayne State University produced To Gleam It Around, To Show My Shine, which is based on Their Eyes Were Watching God. The play was written by Bonnie Lee Moss Rattner and directed by Von Washington. It has been produced numerous times by other companies.
- Oprah Winfrey served as executive producer of the made-for-TV adaptation Their Eyes Were Watching God in 2005. Harpo Productions sponsored the film, directed by Darnell Martin and with a screenplay written by Suzan-Lori Parks, Misan Sagay and Bobby Smith Jr.
- In 2011, the novel was adapted as a radio play for BBC World Drama, dramatized by Patricia Cumper. The play first aired on February 19, 2011.
- In 2012, a live radio play performance of Their Eyes Were Watching God, written by Arthur Yorinks, was recorded and broadcast to celebrate the 75th anniversary of the book's publication.
