= Sylvia del Villard =

Puerto Rican actress

- Actress, dancer, choreographer and Afro-Puerto Rican activist
- Born: February 28, 1928; Santurce, Puerto Rico
- Died: February 28, 1990 (aged 62); San Juan, Puerto Rico

Notes
- Sylvia Del Villard was the first and only director of the office of the Afro-Puerto Rican affairs of the Puerto Rican Institute of Culture.

Sylvia Del Villard (February 28, 1928 – February 28, 1990), was an actress, dancer, choreographer and Afro-Puerto Rican activist.

== Early years ==
Del Villard was born in Santurce, Puerto Rico. As a young child, Del Villard would entertain her parents, Agustin and Marcoline Del Villard, with her dances. Her family considered her very talented and she was also a good student at school. She received her primary and secondary education in Santurce and when she graduated from high school the government of Puerto Rico awarded her with a scholarship to attend college.

Del Villard studied Sociology and Anthropology at Fisk University in Tennessee. However, Del Villard had to deal with the anti-black discrimination which was rampant in the southern regions of the United States at that time. She returned to Puerto Rico and enrolled in the University of Puerto Rico where she earned her degree.

Upon graduating, Del Villard traveled to New York City and enrolled in the City College of New York. It was during this period that she was to develop a passion and love for Africa. She joined the song and ballet group called the "Africa House". Del Villard took dance and voice lessons with Leo Braun at the Metropolitan Opera.

== Acting career ==
Among the theater productions in which Del Villard has participated in Puerto Rico and abroad are: La Muerte (Death), La Tempestad (The Storm) and Let My People Go. She danced as a ballerina in the following American productions: Valley Without Echo, Witches of Salem, The Boyfriend, The Crucible and Kwamina. In Puerto Rico she joined the Afro-Boricua Ballet. With the ballet she participated in the following Afro-Puerto Rican productions, Palesiana y Aquelarre and Palesianisima.

In 1968, she founded the Afro-Boricua El Coqui Theater, which was recognized by the Panamerican Association of the New World Festival as the most important authority of Black Puerto Rican culture. The Theater group were given a contract which permitted them to present their act in other countries and in various universities in the United States.

Del Villard's favorite poet was Luis Palés Matos. In 1969, she established a theater/school in San Juan and named it after him. However, it wasn't long before she closed the theater because of the continuous complaints she received from her neighbors. Although many, including herself, felt the complaints were politically motivated and marked the beginning of a voluntary exile that eventually brought her to Hollywood, California.

== Director of the office of the Afro-Puerto Rican affairs ==
She moved back to New York where she founded a new theater group which she named Sininke. She made many presentations in the Museum of Natural History in that city. In 1981, she became the first and only director of the office of the Afro-Puerto Rican affairs of the Puerto Rican Institute of Culture. She was known to be an outspoken activist who fought for the equal rights of the Black Puerto Rican artist.

== Later years ==
In 1981 in California, Del Villard was diagnosed with lung cancer and returned to the island to receive treatment for her condition. Sylvia del Villard died on February 28, 1990, in San Juan, Puerto Rico. She was buried at Villa Palmeras Cemetery in Santurce, Puerto Rico.

== Legacy ==
In 1993, Banco Popular de Puerto Rico produced a musical with the participation of many noted artists titled Ocho Puertas: Un Especial para la historia (Eight Doors: A Historical Special), which paid tribute to Del Villard among other artists. In the East Village of New York City, there is the Sylvia Del Villard Program of the Roberto Clemente Center, a Spanish day treatment program named after her. In Chicago, there is a Sylvia Del Villard Hall at the Segundo Ruiz Belvis Cultural Center.

== See also ==
- List of Puerto Ricans
- List of Puerto Ricans of African descent
- French immigration to Puerto Rico
- History of women in Puerto Rico
