= Guerrilla (TV series) =

- Showtime poster for Guerrilla
- Genre: Drama
- Written by: John Ridley; Misan Sagay
- Directed by: John Ridley; Sam Miller
- Starring: Idris Elba; Freida Pinto; Rory Kinnear; Babou Ceesay; Bella Dayne; Daniel Mays; Zawe Ashton; Nathaniel Martello-White; Brandon Scott; Nicholas Pinnock
- Country of origin: United Kingdom
- Original language: English
- No. of series: 1
- No. of episodes: 6

Production
- Executive producers: Sasha Harris; Katie Swinden; Idris Elba; Michael J. McDonald; John Ridley; Patrick Spence; Tracy Underwood
- Producer: Yvonne Isimeme Ibazebo
- Cinematography: Giulio Biccari; Ramsey Nickell; Ari Wegner
- Editors: Dan Roberts; Sarah Brewerton; Tania Reddin
- Running time: 60 minutes
- Production companies: ABC Signature; Green Door Pictures; International Famous Players Radio Pictures Corporation; Fifty Fathoms Productions; Stearns Castle

Original release
- Network: Sky Atlantic
- Release: 13 April – 18 May 2017

Guerrilla is a British drama television series set in early 1970s London, against the backdrop of the Immigration Act 1971 and British black power movements such as the British Black Panthers and Race Today Collective. It was written and directed by John Ridley and stars Idris Elba, Freida Pinto and Babou Ceesay in leading roles. Guerrilla debuted on Sky Atlantic on 13 April 2017 and on Showtime on 16 April 2017.

== Plot ==
A love story set against the backdrop of one of the most politically explosive times in UK history. A politically active couple (played by Freida Pinto and Babou Ceesay) have their relationship and values tested, when they liberate a political prisoner and form a radical underground cell in 1970s London.

== Main cast ==
- Idris Elba as Kentoro "Kent" Abbasi
- Freida Pinto as Jas Mitra
- Babou Ceesay as Marcus Hill
- Rory Kinnear as Pence
- Patrick Gibson as Connor
- Zawe Ashton as Omega
- Daniel Mays as Cullen
- Bella Dayne as Eliette
- Wunmi Mosaku as Kenya
- Nathaniel Martello-White as Dhari Bishop
- Denise Gough as Fallon
- Brandon Scott as Leroy
- Nicholas Pinnock as Julian

== Production ==
The show was inspired by the political activism of British Black Panther (BBP) members Farrukh Dhondy and Darcus Howe, members of the Race Today Collective. Howe and Dhondy were consultants for the show, while Dhondy was also asked to be a script editor. Ridley also consulted other BBP members, including Neil Kenlock and Leila Hassan. The character Jas Mitra, played by Freida Pinto, was inspired by BBP member Mala Sen, another member of the Race Today Collective.

Five episodes were written by John Ridley, who also directed the first two episodes and the finale. Misan Sagay wrote the fifth episode, with Sam Miller directing the other episodes.

== Episodes ==
No.	Title	Directed by	Written by	Original release date	US viewers (millions)
1	"Episode 1"	John Ridley	John Ridley	April 16, 2017	0.182
2	"Episode 2"	John Ridley	John Ridley	April 23, 2017	0.131
3	"Episode 3"	Sam Miller	John Ridley	April 30, 2017	0.109
4	"Episode 4"	Sam Miller	John Ridley	May 7, 2017	0.085
5	"Episode 5"	Sam Miller	Misan Sagay	May 14, 2017	0.061
6	"Episode 6"	John Ridley	John Ridley	May 14, 2017	0.043

== Broadcast ==
Guerilla premiered 13 April 2017 on Sky Atlantic in the United Kingdom and 16 April 2017 on cable network Showtime in United States.

== Reception ==
The show has received positive reviews, with a "fresh" 75% rating on Rotten Tomatoes, and a "generally favorable" 76% rating on Metacritic.

== Controversy ==
The drama has been criticised for excluding the historical role played by black women who were part of the British Black Panthers (BBP) organization. There has been debate about erasure of black women, since none of the lead characters are black women and the female lead is played by an Indian woman. The most prominent black woman in the first episode is working to support racism.

Several former BBP members have responded to the controversy including, Neil Kenlock, Farrukh Dhondy, and Elizabeth Obi. All three have defended Pinto's casting and the role of Asians in the movement as historically appropriate. However, Obi also criticised the absence of black women in leading roles, as well as the representation of black women in the first episode.

Writing for The Guardian, Obi said: "I was there, and I find the portrayal of black women unforgivable". Obi was supportive of Pinto's casting as Jas Mitra, stating that her character "is quite obviously in recognition of Mala Sen, who was part of the leadership of the Black Panther movement....For me it was an absolute pleasure to have Mala's contribution acknowledged through the role of Jas." Obi goes on to say that "the portrayal of black women in the first episode was unforgivable, as they are represented solely by Wunmi Mosaku’s character Kenya, a sex worker whose clients include the police inspector Pence." Later Obi states: "It is impossible to watch Guerrilla without noticing the gaping hole it leaves in the story of the struggle for racial justice. Black women – including Althea Jones-Lecointe, Olive Morris and Gail Lewis – weren’t just part of the history of the black power movement, they led it in Britain."

On the other hand, while at a screening Kenlock stated: "I'm the only person here who was part of the movement and John has got it spot on. Mala Sen, an Asian woman, was extremely active." Dhondy noted that the BBP began in the late 1960s by a collective of black and Asian activists working together under the banner of "blackness", with "Black" as a political label for all people of colour. He wrote that, along with black women such as Altheia Jones, Asian men and women, such as himself and Sen, were also prominent in the movement. He also noted that, along with the lack of a black female lead, the series also lacks an Asian male lead, despite Asian men such as himself, Sunit Chopra and Vivan Sundaram being prominent BBP members. According to Dhondy, at least 20 Asian women held leadership positions in the British black power movement, including founders of the Southall Black Sisters and the Organisation for Women of Asian and African Descent.
