= Lackawanna Blues =

2001 play

Lackawanna Blues is an American play written by Ruben Santiago-Hudson that premiered in 2001. It was later adapted as a television movie that aired in 2005. The play dramatizes the character of the author's primary caregiver when he was growing up in Lackawanna, New York, during the 1950s and 1960s.

== Play ==
The play debuted off Broadway on April 14, 2001, at The Public Theater in New York City. It was directed by Loretta Greco, produced by George C. Wolfe, and the executive producer was Fran Reiter. Rosemarie Tichler was the artistic producer.

The play is a montage of reminiscences, memories, testimonials and roman a clefs of "Miss Rachel," or Nanny, as the young Ruben Santiago, Jr. calls her. Largely abandoned by his parents, Ruben finds that Nanny becomes his surrogate family. Various incidents in Ruben's and Nanny's life are portrayed, with a large cast of quirky minor characters—friends, boarders, family members, visitors, relatives, and so on—providing commentary on Nanny's strength of character, intelligence, and morality.

The play included several songs, either sung by the characters in the play or as ambient music heard via a radio or through a window. The late Bill Sims Jr. provided the original music, as well as performing on-stage acoustic guitar for the play.

Lackawanna Blues is intended to be a one-man show. The actor narrating the play (an adult Ruben) was intended to portray more than 20 other characters, as well as the starring role of the young Ruben.

The play was very well received. The New York Times called it a "tour de force." Playwright Ruben Santiago-Hudson won an OBIE special citation for Lackawanna Blues, while Bill Sims, Jr. won an OBIE for his music.

Lackawanna Blues began previews on Broadway at the Samuel J. Friedman Theatre on September 14, 2021 and originally was set to open on September 28. However, on September 24, two previews were cancelled because Santiago-Hudson suffered from a back injury. The play's opening was delayed two days later to September 30. To give Santiago-Hudson time to recuperate, the show was then set to open on October 7; after further performance cancellations, performances resumed on October 12.

== Film version ==
A television film adaptation aired on HBO on February 12, 2005. The film was directed by George C. Wolfe, who had commissioned the stage version. For her work in the movie, S. Epatha Merkerson won a Best Actress Golden Globe, Screen Actors Guild, and Emmy Award in 2006.
