= Lackawanna Blues (film) =

2005 television film

- Television release poster
- Genre: Biographical drama
- Based on: Lackawanna Blues by Ruben Santiago-Hudson
- Screenplay by: Ruben Santiago-Hudson
- Directed by: George C. Wolfe
- Starring: S. Epatha Merkerson; Marcus Carl Franklin; Mos Def; Carmen Ejogo; Louis Gossett Jr.; Macy Gray; Terrence Howard; Delroy Lindo; Rosie Perez; Liev Schreiber; Ruben Santiago-Hudson; Jimmy Smits; Jeffrey Wright
- Music by: Meshell Ndegeocello
- Country of origin: United States
- Original language: English

Production
- Executive producers: Halle Berry; Vincent Cirrincione; Ruben Santiago-Hudson; Shelby Stone
- Producer: Nellie Rachel Nugiel
- Cinematography: Ivan Strasburg
- Editor: Brian A. Kates
- Running time: 95 minutes
- Production companies: HBO Films; Bellah Films; Good Shepherd Entertainment

Original release
- Network: HBO
- Release: February 12, 2005

Lackawanna Blues is a 2005 American biographical drama television film directed by George C. Wolfe and written by Ruben Santiago-Hudson. It aired on HBO on February 12, 2005. It is based on the play of the same name by Santiago-Hudson. Wolfe had commissioned the stage version.

For her work in the movie, S. Epatha Merkerson won a Primetime Emmy Award, a Golden Globe Award, and a Screen Actors Guild Award in 2006.

== Premise ==
Lackawanna Blues is the true story of Ruben Santiago Jr. growing up in Lackawanna, New York. He was raised by his father and mother and the neighborhood boarding house lady known as Rachel "Nanny" Crosby. Ruben was born in 1956 to his Puerto Rican father Ruben Santiago and his African-American mother Alean Hudson. His mother was too mentally unstable to take good care of him; residing in mental hospitals, Alean disappears and reappears throughout Ruben's life. His father stayed at Nanny's boarding house, but he was frequently not around due to working long hours or out looking for work. Nanny more or less took care of Ruben Jr. as a mother figure. The television movie depicts his life growing up there and the diverse characters that he meets during his and their stays at the boarding house.

== Cast ==
- S. Epatha Merkerson as Rachel "Nanny" Crosby
- Hill Harper as Ruben Santiago Jr. as an adult
  - Marcus Carl Franklin as Ruben Santiago Jr. as a boy, ages 7–10
- Jimmy Smits as Ruben Santiago Sr., Ruben's father
- Terrence Howard as Bill Crosby, Nanny's much younger husband
- Mos Def as The Bandleader
- Carmen Ejogo as Alean Hudson, Ruben's mother
- Louis Gossett Jr as Ol'lem Taylor, a retired Negro league baseball player
- Macy Gray as Pauline, a resident and Jimmy's girlfriend
- Michael K. Williams as Jimmy, a resident and Pauline's boyfriend
- Ernie Hudson as Dick Barrymore, a cabaret owner
- Delroy Lindo as Mr. Lucious, a resident
- Rosie Perez as Bertha, a hairdresser and resident
- Adina Porter as Ricky, a resident
- Jeffrey Wright as Small Paul
- Barry Shabaka Henley as Shakey Winfield, a resident and Nanny's cousin
- Ruben Santiago-Hudson as Freddie Cobbs, a World War II veteran
- Saul Williams as Lonnie, a resident and Vietnam War veteran
- Liev Schreiber as Ulysses Ford, a social worker
- Julie Benz as Laura, an abused wife
- Henry Simmons as Jesse, Laura's abusive husband
- Patricia Wettig as Laura's Mother
- Ron Kellum as Fish Fry guest
- Robert Bradley as Otis McClanahan (credited as "Robert A. Bradley" in some sources)

The blind Detroit street singer Robert Bradley from the band Robert Bradley's Blackwater Surprise appears in the film. He performs on-screen and has three songs featured on the soundtrack (including a duet with Macy Gray).

== Production ==
Began shooting March 1, 2004 and completed shooting April 1, 2004.

== Awards and nominations ==
Year	Award	Category	Nominee(s)	Result	Ref.
2005	Artios Awards	Outstanding Achievement in Movie of the Week Casting	John Papsidera and Wendy O'Brien	Won	
2005	Humanitas Prize	90 Minute or Longer Network or Syndicated Television	Ruben Santiago-Hudson	Won	
2005	Online Film & Television Association Awards	Best Motion Picture Made for Television		Nominated	
2005	Online Film & Television Association Awards	Best Actor in a Motion Picture or Miniseries	Marcus Carl Franklin	Nominated	
2005	Online Film & Television Association Awards	Best Actress in a Motion Picture or Miniseries	S. Epatha Merkerson	Won	
2005	Online Film & Television Association Awards	Best Supporting Actor in a Motion Picture or Miniseries	Terrence Howard	Nominated	
2005	Online Film & Television Association Awards	Best Supporting Actress in a Motion Picture or Miniseries	Macy Gray	Nominated	
2005	Online Film & Television Association Awards	Best Direction of a Motion Picture or Miniseries	George C. Wolfe	Nominated	
2005	Online Film & Television Association Awards	Best Writing of a Motion Picture or Miniseries	Ruben Santiago-Hudson	Nominated	
2005	Online Film & Television Association Awards	Best Ensemble in a Motion Picture or Miniseries		Won	
2005	Online Film & Television Association Awards	Best Costume Design in a Motion Picture or Miniseries		Nominated	
2005	Online Film & Television Association Awards	Best Editing in a Motion Picture or Miniseries		Nominated	
2005	Online Film & Television Association Awards	Best Lighting in a Motion Picture or Miniseries		Nominated	
2005	Online Film & Television Association Awards	Best Makeup/Hairstyling in a Motion Picture or Miniseries		Nominated	
2005	Online Film & Television Association Awards	Best Music in a Motion Picture or Miniseries	Meshell Ndegeocello	Nominated	
2005	Online Film & Television Association Awards	Best Production Design in a Motion Picture or Miniseries		Nominated	
2005	Online Film & Television Association Awards	Best Sound in a Motion Picture or Miniseries		Nominated	
2005	Primetime Emmy Awards	Outstanding Made for Television Movie	Halle Berry, Vincent Cirrincione, Shelby Stone, Ruben Santiago-Hudson, and Nellie Nugiel	Nominated	
2005	Primetime Emmy Awards	Outstanding Lead Actress in a Miniseries or a Movie	S. Epatha Merkerson	Won	
2005	Primetime Emmy Awards	Outstanding Directing for a Miniseries, Movie or a Dramatic Special	George C. Wolfe	Nominated	
2005	Primetime Emmy Awards	Outstanding Casting for a Miniseries, Movie or Special	John Papsidera	Won	
2005	Primetime Emmy Awards	Outstanding Hairstyling for a Miniseries, Movie or a Special	Charles Gregory Ross and Fay Kelly	Nominated	
2005	Primetime Emmy Awards	Outstanding Makeup for a Miniseries, Movie or a Special (Non-Prosthetic)	Edna Sheen, Denise Pugh-Ruiz, and Karen Westerfield	Nominated	
2005	Primetime Emmy Awards	Outstanding Single-Camera Sound Mixing for a Miniseries or a Movie	Susumu Tokunow, Rick Ash, and Adam Jenkins	Nominated	
2005	Satellite Awards	Best Motion Picture Made for Television		Nominated	
2005	Satellite Awards	Best Actress in a Miniseries or Motion Picture Made for Television	S. Epatha Merkerson	Nominated	
2005	Television Critics Association Awards	Outstanding Achievement in Movies, Miniseries and Specials		Nominated	
2005	Women's Image Network Awards	Actress in Made-for-TV Movie/Miniseries	S. Epatha Merkerson	Nominated	
2006	AARP Movies for Grownups Awards	Best TV Movie		Nominated	
2006	American Cinema Editors Awards	Best Edited Miniseries or Motion Picture for Non-Commercial Television	Brian A. Kates	Won	
2006	BET Awards	Best Actor	Terrence Howard	Won	
2006	Black Reel Awards	Outstanding TV Movie or Mini-Series	Halle Berry and Vincent Cirrincione	Won	
2006	Black Reel Awards	Outstanding Director, TV Movie or Mini-Series	George C. Wolfe	Won	
2006	Black Reel Awards	Outstanding Actress, TV Movie or Mini-Series	S. Epatha Merkerson	Won	
2006	Black Reel Awards	Outstanding Supporting Actor, TV Movie or Mini-Series	Terrence Howard	Nominated	
2006	Black Reel Awards	Outstanding Supporting Actor, TV Movie or Mini-Series	Jeffrey Wright	Won	
2006	Black Reel Awards	Outstanding Supporting Actress, TV Movie or Mini-Series	Carmen Ejogo	Won	
2006	Black Reel Awards	Outstanding Supporting Actress, TV Movie or Mini-Series	Rosie Perez	Nominated	
2006	Black Reel Awards	Outstanding Supporting Actress, TV Movie or Mini-Series	Adina Porter	Nominated	
2006	Black Reel Awards	Outstanding Screenplay, TV Movie or Mini-Series	Ruben Santiago-Hudson	Won	
2006	Cinema Audio Society Awards	Outstanding Achievement in Sound Mixing for Television Movies and Mini-Series	Susumu Tokunow, Rick Ash, and Adam Jenkins	Won	
2006	Costume Designers Guild Awards	Outstanding Made for Television Movie or Miniseries	Hope Hanafin	Nominated	
2006	Directors Guild of America Awards	Outstanding Directorial Achievement in Movies for Television or Miniseries	George C. Wolfe	Won (Note: Tied with Joseph Sargent for Warm Springs.)	
2006	Golden Globe Awards	Best Miniseries or Television Film		Nominated	
2006	Golden Globe Awards	Best Actress – Miniseries or Television Film	S. Epatha Merkerson	Won	
2006	Golden Reel Awards	Best Sound Editing in Television Long Form – Dialogue and Automated; Dialogue Replacement	Jon Mete, Michael Hertlein, and Paul Longstaffe	Won	
2006	Gracie Awards	Outstanding Lead Actress – Miniseries	S. Epatha Merkerson	Won	
2006	Independent Spirit Awards	Best First Feature		Nominated	
2006	Independent Spirit Awards	Best Female Lead	S. Epatha Merkerson	Nominated	
2006	NAACP Image Awards	Outstanding Television Movie, Mini-Series or Dramatic Special		Won	
2006	NAACP Image Awards	Outstanding Actor in a Television Movie, Mini-Series or Dramatic Special	Terrence Howard	Won	
2006	NAACP Image Awards	Outstanding Actor in a Television Movie, Mini-Series or Dramatic Special	Jeffrey Wright	Nominated	
2006	NAACP Image Awards	Outstanding Actress in a Television Movie, Mini-Series or Dramatic Special	Carmen Ejogo	Won	
2006	NAACP Image Awards	Outstanding Actress in a Television Movie, Mini-Series or Dramatic Special	Macy Gray	Nominated	
2006	NAACP Image Awards	Outstanding Actress in a Television Movie, Mini-Series or Dramatic Special	S. Epatha Merkerson	Won	
2006	NAACP Image Awards	Outstanding Actress in a Television Movie, Mini-Series or Dramatic Special	Rosie Perez	Nominated	
2006	NAACP Image Awards	Outstanding Directing in a Feature Film/Television Movie	George C. Wolfe	Nominated	
2006	NAMIC Vision Awards	Best Drama		Won	
2006	NAMIC Vision Awards	Best Dramatic Performance	S. Epatha Merkerson	Nominated	
2006	National Board of Review Awards	Best Film or Mini-Series Made for Cable TV		Won	
2006	Producers Guild of America Awards	David L. Wolper Award for Outstanding Producer of Long-Form Television	Ruben Santiago-Hudson, Halle Berry, Vincent Cirrincione, Shelby Stone, and Nellie Nugiel	Nominated	
2006	Screen Actors Guild Awards	Outstanding Performance by a Female Actor in a Miniseries or Television Movie	S. Epatha Merkerson	Won	
2006	Writers Guild of America Awards	Long Form – Adapted	Ruben Santiago-Hudson – Based on his play	Nominated	
