= Rafael Cordero (educator) =

Puerto Rican educator (1790–1868)

Venerable Rafael Cordero y Molina
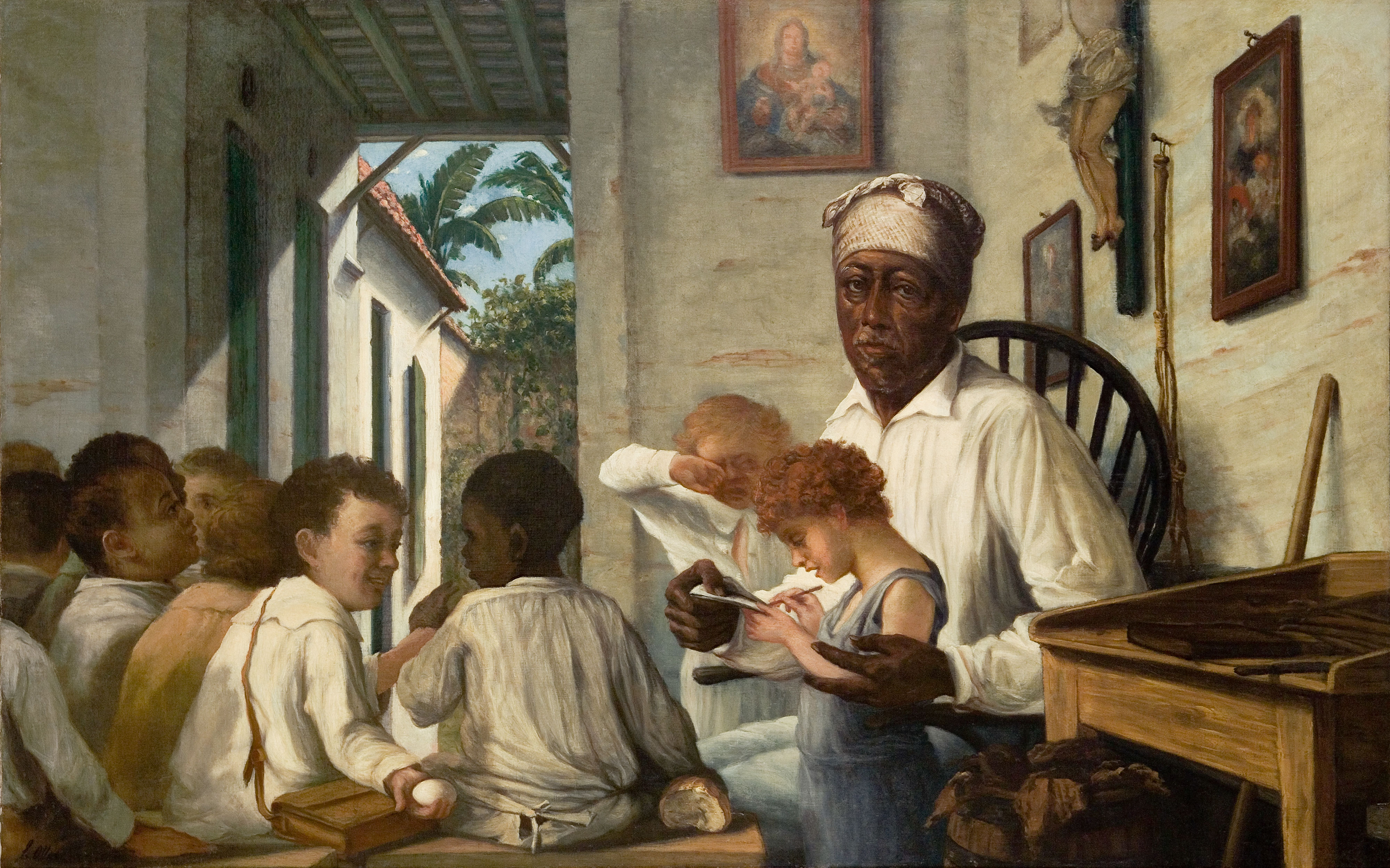
- La Escuela del Maestro Rafael Cordero (1891) by Francisco Oller
- Born: 24 October 1790; San Juan, Puerto Rico
- Died: 5 July 1868 (aged 77); San Juan, Puerto Rico

Rafael Cordero y Molina (October 24, 1790 – July 5, 1868), sometimes known as "Maestro Cordero", was a self-educated Puerto Rican who provided free schooling to the children of his city regardless of race or social standing.

In 2003, the Catholic Church began the process of Cordero's beatification. In 2013, Pope Francis recognized him as Venerable.

== Early years ==
Cordero was born in San Juan, Puerto Rico, then part of the Viceroyalty of New Spain, into a low-income family. He was one of three children, born to Lucas Cordero and Rita Molina. His two older sisters were Gregoria and Celestina. His father worked in the tobacco fields, while his mother tended the house. Cordero, who was of African ancestry, was self-educated. His love of literature and his determination to teach others and educate himself helped him develop the skills and preparation to teach primary school. Cordero received the sacrament of Confirmation at the age of 14 from Bishop Juan Alejo de Arizmendi (1760–1814), the first native bishop of the island. He grew up and lived his life as a devout Catholic. In 1802, his older sister Celestina, also a pious Catholic, established a "escuela de amigas" for girls on the island.

== Career ==
In 1826 Cordero established a free school for all the children in his house. He taught children regardless of their race and those who could not afford an education otherwise. There, he taught reading, calligraphy, mathematics, and religious instruction. Among the distinguished alumni who attended Cordero's school were Román Baldorioty de Castro and Alejandro Tapia y Rivera. Cordero maintained his educational center for 58 years at Luna Street. He proved that racial and economic integration could be possible and accepted.

Cordero was awarded the Premio de Virtud by the Sociedad Económica de Amigos del País en Puerto Rico, an economic club whose members were friends of Puerto Rico. He was given 100 pesos, which he, in turn, gave away to those in need. He used half of the money (50 pesos) to buy books and clothes for his students, and the other half was given to the homeless.

He was a great agitator for the abolition of slavery:

To the teachings of Rafael Cordero more than to any man in Puerto Rico is due the credit for the abolition of slavery in that island. His school was a man factory. The decree of the national Spanish assembly issued in 1873 abolished slavery in Puerto Rico forever.

== Death ==
The people's love and respect for Cordero were evidenced by the fact that more than 2,000 people attended his funeral in 1868.

== Honors and beatification process ==
Puerto Rican poet José Gualberto Padilla published a poem titled "El maestro Rafael" honoring the educator. In 1891, Rafael Cordero was immortalized in a painting titled La Escuela del Maestro Rafael Cordero by the artist Francisco Oller which can be seen in the Puerto Rican Athenaeum.

The Puerto Rico Teachers Association annually awards the teacher who has distinguished himself or herself in the field of public or private education with the National Medal Rafael Cordero. There are various schools named after him, among them a high school in San Juan, an elementary school in Aguadilla, an elementary school in Jersey City, New Jersey, and a Junior High School in Brooklyn, New York.

In 2003 the Holy See accepted the local investigations ordered by the Archbishop of San Juan, Roberto González Nieves, OFM, for further study in the process for Cordero's beatification. On December 9, 2013, Pope Francis advanced the cause for Cordero when he declared that Cordero had practised heroic virtue and has been declared venerable.

== Gallery ==
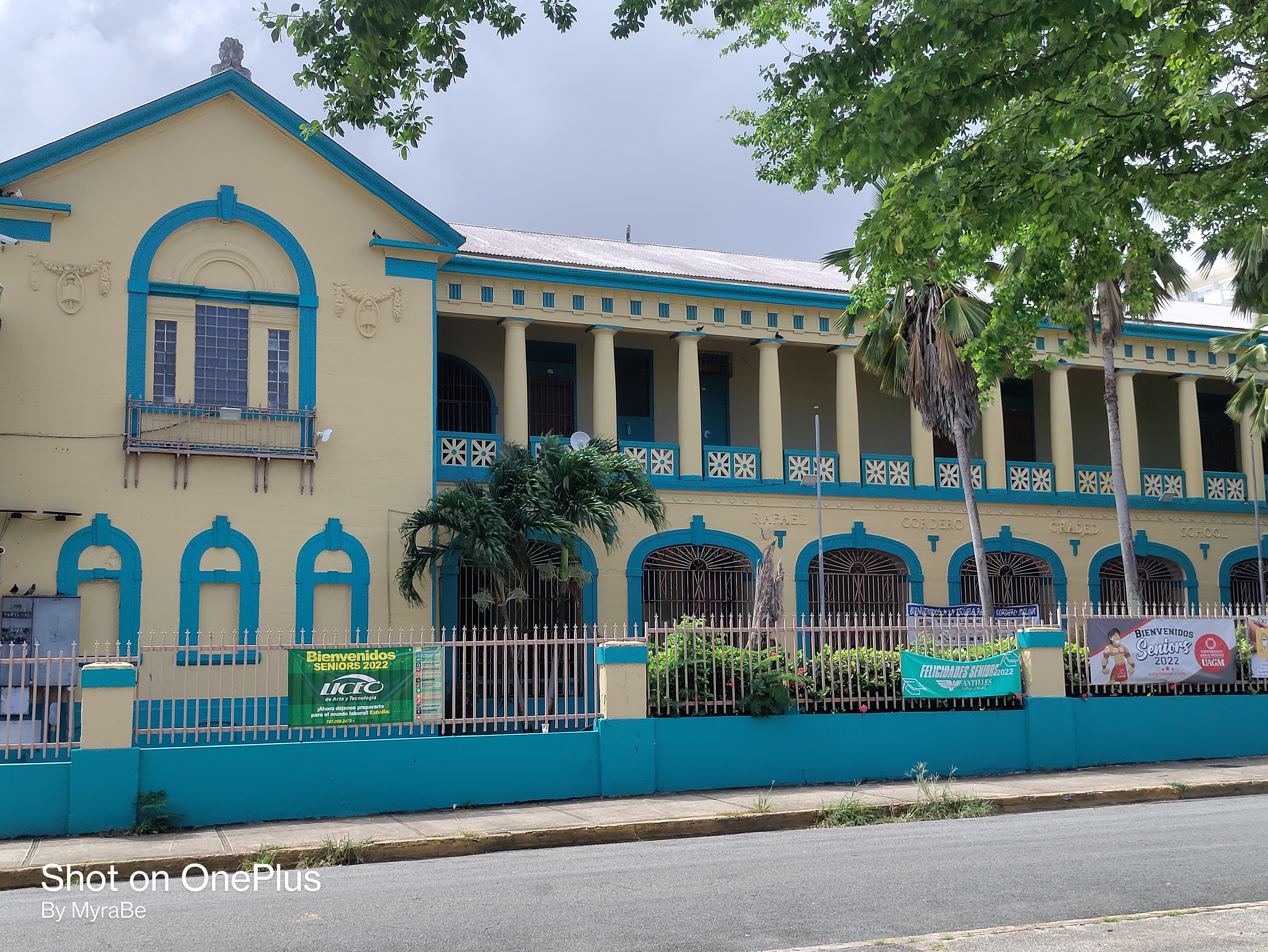
School named in honor of Rafael Cordero in Cataño

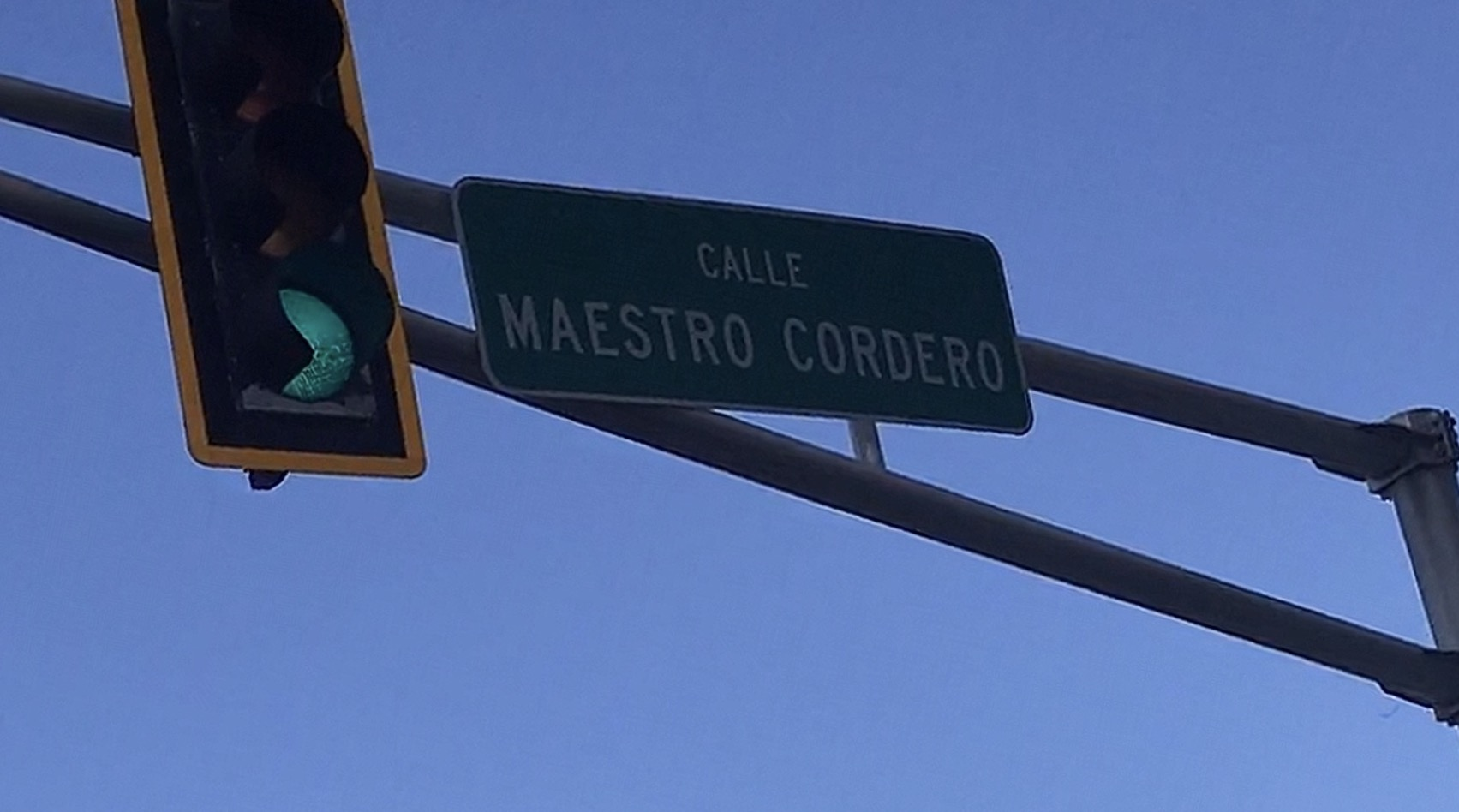
The street sign of Calle Maestro Rafael in San Juan

== See also ==
- List of Puerto Ricans
- List of Puerto Ricans of African descent
- Black history in Puerto Rico
