= Misan Sagay =

British-Nigerian screenwriter

- Education: University of St Andrews
- Occupation: Screenwriter
- Years active: 1999–present

Misan Sagay is a British-Nigerian screenwriter, best known for the 2013 film Belle.

== Biography ==
Sagay was born in Nigeria and at the age of five moved with her parents to England. She graduated from St Andrews University with a first-class Honours degree in biochemistry, then trained as a doctor at St Mary's Hospital Medical School, London.

After qualifying as a doctor, she specialised in Paediatric Haematology and Critical Care and at the Bone Marrow Transplant Unit at Westminster Children's Hospital.

== Career ==
A former emergency room doctor, Sagay made her writing debut with the 1999 film The Secret Laughter of Women on which she was a writer and producer. She co-wrote the teleplay for the Oprah-produced television movie Their Eyes Were Watching God (2005), based on the 1937 novel of the same name by Zora Neale Hurston.

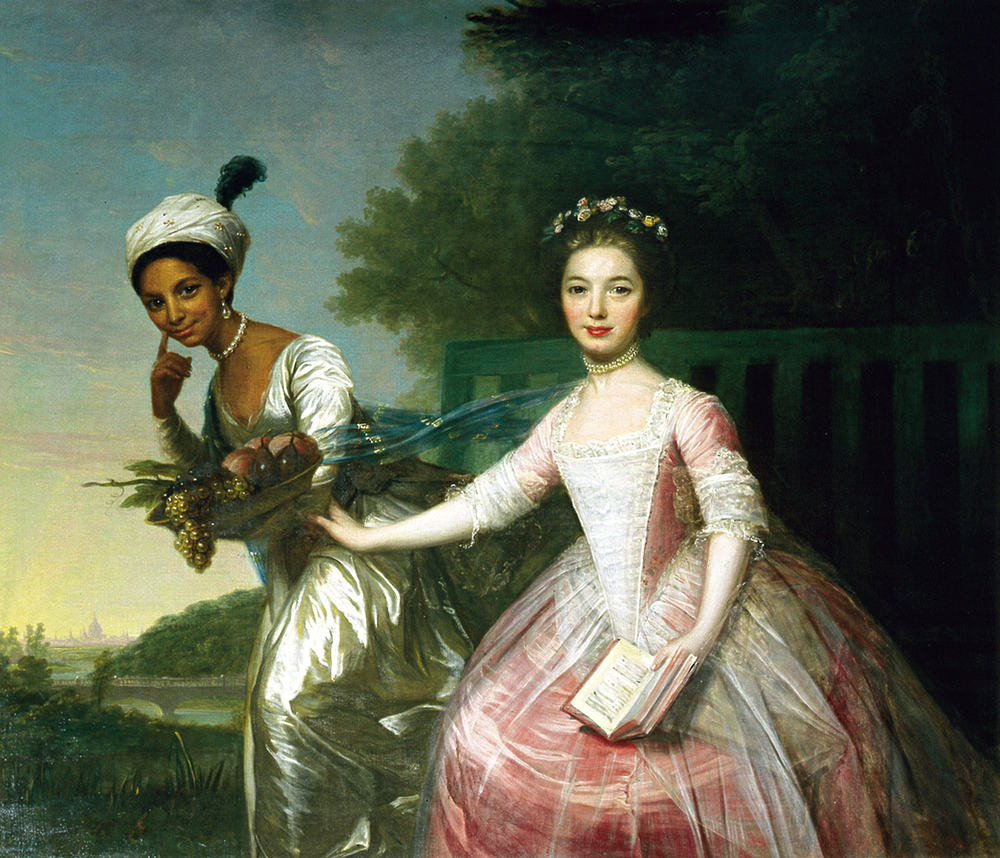
Dido Elizabeth Belle and Lady Elizabeth Murray by David Martin. Portrait of Dido Elizabeth Belle Lindsay (1761–1804) and her cousin Lady Elizabeth Murray

Sagay wrote the 2013 British drama Belle after visiting Scone Palace, where she saw a unique portraiture of two women, Dido Elizabeth Belle Lindsay and her cousin Lady Elizabeth Murray. This painting, and the women within, acted as the inspiration for her screenplay. The film tells the Story of Belle, the daughter of an enslaved African and a British admiral. The film discusses the prominence of African decedents and women in British society in the late 1700s.

In 2013, the authorship of the film was in dispute. The director of the film, Amma Asante, contested that she dismissed Sagay's writing and instead wrote her own adaptation of the story, seeking writing credit. Asante's claim caused the Writers Guild of America to automatically investigate per the guild's regulations. The guild took the case through arbitration and ruled in favour of Sagay as the sole writer. Asante appealed but lost.

In 2016, Sagay was a co-writer on the six-part limited TV series Guerrilla from award-winning writer and producer John Ridley, known as the screenwriter of 12 years A Slave. The Showtime and Sky Atlantic series stars award-winning actor Idris Elba, known for the TV series Luther.

Sagay is a member of the Academy of Motion Picture Arts and Sciences.

Away from screenwriting, Misan is creating a programme with the Tisch School of Fine Arts in Florence, which aims to help establish connections between aspiring black screenwriters and established ones. The end goal is to help provide guidance to the next generation of talent.

Sagay is also a member of the Wolfe pack, a guild of 50 leading female Screenwriters working in Hollywood that aims to encourage more women to enter the film business. Misan hopes also to be a catalyst for African descendants to take charge of their own narratives. Sagan said in an interview with The Guardian: "Black women need to be in control of their own stories and that means hiring more black talent across all aspects of film and television."

== Filmography ==
Year	Title	Notes
1999	The Secret Laughter of Women	Co-writer & Producer
2005	Their Eyes Were Watching God	Co-writer
2013	Belle	Writer
2017	Guerrilla	TV series

== Awards, honours and nominations ==
Misan Sagay was nominated for a 2005 Black Reel Awards for Best Screenplay, Original or Adapted – Television for Their Eyes Were Watching God.

Sagay was nominated for a 2015 Black Reel Awards for Best Screenplay for Belle.

Sagay received the 2015 NAACP Image Award for Outstanding Writing in a Motion Picture for Belle.
