= Ruben Santiago-Hudson =

American actor and screenwriter (born 1956)

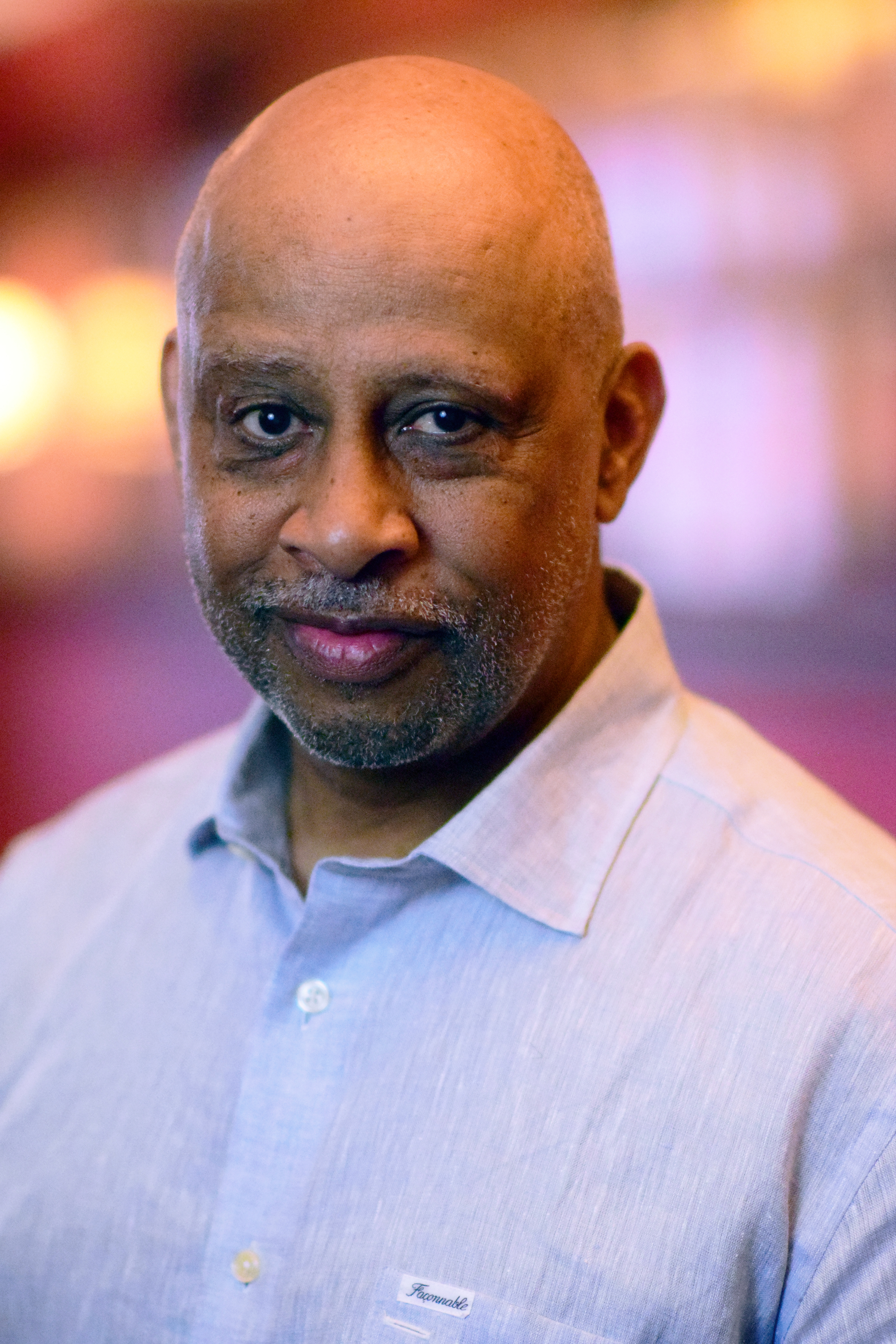
- Santiago-Hudson in 2022
- Born: Ruben Santiago Jr. November 24, 1956 (age 69); Lackawanna, New York, U.S.
- Education: Binghamton University (BA); Wayne State University (MFA)
- Occupations: Actor; playwright; director
- Years active: 1988–present
- Spouse: Jeannie Brittan
- Children: 4, including Lily

Ruben Santiago-Hudson (born Ruben Santiago Jr., November 24, 1956) is an American actor, playwright, and director who has won national awards for his work in all three categories. He has received a Tony Award and three Drama Desk Awards as well as a nomination for a Primetime Emmy Award. He won the Humanitas Prize in 2005 and the Lucille Lortel Award for Lifetime Achievement in 2024.

He made his Broadway debut in the musical Jelly's Last Jam (1992). He then acted in the August Wilson play Seven Guitars (1996) for which he won the Tony Award for Best Featured Actor in a Play. He was Tony-nominated for his roles in his solo show Lackawanna Blues (2022) and the revival Joe Turner's Come and Gone (2026). As a director he was Tony-nominated for his work on the August Wilson revival Jitney (2017).

On television, he portrayed Captain Roy Montgomery in the ABC crime mystery romance series Castle from 2009 to 2011. He has taken recurring roles in Another World (1987–1993), Dear John (1990–1992), Spawn (1997–1999), and Billions (2016–2023). He has also acted in the HBO television films Lackawanna Blues (2005), Their Eyes Were Watching God (2005), and The Immortal Life of Henrietta Lacks (2017).

He made his feature film debut with a small role in the comedy Coming to America (1988) and has since taken supporting roles in the supernatural film The Devil's Advocate (1997), the action thriller Shaft (2000), and the crime drama American Gangster (2007). He portrayed Bayard Rustin in the Ava DuVernay directed historical drama Selma (2013). He served as a writer for the Netflix film adaptation of Ma Rainey's Black Bottom (2020) for which he was nominated for the Writers Guild of America Award for Best Adapted Screenplay.

== Early life ==
Ruben Hudson was born in 1956 in Lackawanna, New York, the son of Alean Hudson and Ruben Santiago, a railroad worker. He later adopted his mother's maiden name as part of his compound surname. His father was Puerto Rican and his mother was African American. He went to Lackawanna High school, earned his bachelor's degree from Binghamton University, his master's degree from Wayne State University and received an honorary Doctor of Humane Letters from Buffalo State College and Wayne State University.

== Career ==
Santiago-Hudson appeared on Broadway in Jelly's Last Jam (1992), written by George C. Wolfe. He received the 1996 Tony Award for Best Featured Actor in a Play for his performance in August Wilson's Seven Guitars.

He wrote Lackawanna Blues (2001), an autobiographical play in which he portrayed himself and some twenty different characters from his past, which was produced in New York at the Joseph Papp Theatre in 2001. He adapted it for a highly acclaimed, award-winning 2005 HBO film, in which the parts were played by different people. It won the Humanitas Prize and earned Emmy and Writers Guild of America Award nominations. In 2003, he was the reader in Volume 13 of the HBO film, Unchained Memories: Readings from the Slave Narratives. The series was narrated by Whoopi Goldberg. He played Mayor Joe Starks in Their Eyes Were Watching God.

On television, he has appeared on the daytime soap operas One Life to Live, Another World and All My Children. His work in primetime series has included The Cosby Mysteries, New York Undercover, NYPD Blue, Touched by an Angel, The West Wing, Third Watch, Law & Order: Special Victims Unit and five episodes of Law & Order (which coincidentally starred Lackawanna Blues star S. Epatha Merkerson), among others. He starred as New York City Police Captain Roy Montgomery in the ABC series Castle until his character's death occurred in the third-season finale. In 2007, he starred in a PBS Nova documentary about the life of chemist Percy Lavon Julian.

In November 2011, he appeared on Broadway in Lydia R. Diamond's play Stick Fly. In 2013, Santiago-Hudson won the Lucille Lortel Award for Outstanding Director, an Obie Award for Direction, and was nominated for the Drama Desk Award for Outstanding Director of a Play for his work in the Off-Broadway production of August Wilson's The Piano Lesson.

In 2016, he won the Obie Awards Special Citation for Collaboration for his work on Skeleton Crew with Dominique Morisseau and the Atlantic Theater Company.

Santiago-Hudson narrated a number of audiobooks, including James Patterson's Cross Justice which was recognized by the 2017 Audie Award and AudioFile magazine's Earphones Award.

== Personal life ==
Santiago-Hudson has four children: Broderick Santiago and Ruben Santiago III from previous relationships, and Trey and Lily from his marriage with Jeannie Brittan.

When he came to New York in 1983, he was known as Ruben Santiago. He tried to get a part at the Puerto Rican Traveling Theater and was asked if he spoke Spanish, which he does not. When he wanted to work at the Negro Ensemble Company, "they laughed and said, 'We don't have Puerto Ricans.'" So he added his mother's name, Hudson, and eventually won a part in A Soldier's Play at the Ensemble Company.

== Acting credits ==
=== Film ===
Year	Title	Role	Notes
1988	Coming to America	Street Hustler	Credited as Ruben Hudson
1994	Blown Away	Officer Blanket	
1994	Bleeding Hearts	Todd	
1997	White Lies	Bum #2	
1997	The Devil's Advocate	Leamon Heath	
2000	Shaft	Detective Jimmy Groves	
2001	Domestic Disturbance	Sergeant Edgar Stevens	
2002	Winning Girls Through Psychic Mind Control	Samuel Menendez	
2003	Unchained Memories	Reader	
2006	Brother's Shadow	Manny Botero	
2007	Mr. Brooks	Detective Hawkins	
2007	Honeydripper	Stokely	
2007	American Gangster	"Doc"	
2009	The Invention of Lying	Landlord	
2014	Selma	Bayard Rustin	
2020	Ma Rainey's Black Bottom	—N/a	Screenplay by

=== Television ===
Year	Title	Role	Notes
1987–1993	Another World	Gus / Billy Cooper	Recurring role, 12 episodes
1987	Leg Work	Orderly	Episode: "Mystery Woman"
1990	Amen	Fireman	Episode: "Moving In"
1990	Life Goes On	Mr. Serno	Episode: "Corky Rebels"
1990–1992	Dear John	Larry / Orlando / Curtis	Recurring role, 6 episodes
1990–2025	Law & Order	Various roles	Guest role, 7 episodes
1991	Which Way Home	Jim Waters	Miniseries
1994	The Cosby Mysteries	Police Officer	Episode: "Expert Witness"
1994–1995	NYPD Blue	Otis	2 episodes
1994–1996	New York Undercover	Johnny / Walter Perry	2 episodes
1995	Solomon & Sheba	Tamrin	Television film
1995	The Return of Hunter: Everyone Walks in L.A.	Det. Stan Lewis	Television film
1995–1996	Gargoyles	Gabriel (voice)	3 episodes
1996	ABC Afterschool Specials	Kevin	Episode: "Daddy's Girl"
1997–1998	Michael Hayes	Eddie Diaz	Main role, 21 episodes
1997–1999	Spawn	Jess Chapel (voice)	Recurring role, 7 episodes
1998	Rear Window	Antonio Fredericks	Television film
1999	Early Edition	Emmett Brown	2 episodes
1999	The Hunt for the Unicorn Killer	Detective Newhouse	Television film
1999	Touched by an Angel	Dr. Joe Acot	Episode: "Such a Time as This"
1999	The West Wing	Morris Tolliver	Episode: "Post Hoc, Ergo Propter Hoc"
1999	Third Watch	Detective Wolfort, NYPD	Episode: "History of the World"
2000	American Tragedy	Christopher Darden	Television film
2001, 2002	All My Children	Dr. Zeke McMillan #1	Unknown episodes
2002	The Red Sneakers	Uncle Joe	Television film
2002	Little John	Steven	Television film
2003	Whoopi	Marshall	Episode: "Smoke Gets In Your Eyes"
2004	Wild Card	Bennett Graham	Episode: "Sniper Shot, Intern Hot"
2005	Lackawanna Blues	Freddie Combs	Television film; also writer and executive producer
2005	Their Eyes Were Watching God	Joe Starks	Television film
2005	Law & Order: Special Victims Unit	Carlos Guzman	Episode: "Name"
2007	Nova	Percy Julian	Episode: "Forgotten Genius"
2008	Canterbury's Law	Judge Joe Stanley	Episode: "Pilot"
2009–2014	Castle	Captain Roy Montgomery	Main role, 59 episodes
2011	Person of Interest	Sam Latimer	Episode: "Mission Creep"
2013	Low Winter Sun	Charles Dawson	Main role, 10 episodes
2015	The Good Wife	Charles Jinks	Episode: "Loser Edit"
2015	Public Morals	Lieutenant King	Main role, 10 episodes
2016	The Family	Chief of Police Len Bucksey	3 episodes
2016–2023	Billions	Raul Gomez	Recurring role, 9 episodes
2017	Designated Survivor	General Contreras	Episode: "Commander-in-Chief"
2017	The Immortal Life of Henrietta Lacks	Dr. Roland Pattillo	Television film
2017–2018	The Quad	Cecil Diamond	Main role, 18 episodes
2019	David Makes Man	Dr. Bree	5 episodes
2022–2023	East New York	Officer Marvin Sandeford	Main role, 21 episodes

=== Theater ===
Year	Title	Role	Playwright	Venue	notes	Ref.
1992	Jelly's Last Jam	Buddy Bolden	George C. Wolfe	Virginia Theatre, Broadway		
1993	Measure for Measure	Lucio	William Shakespeare	Delacorte Theater		
1994	East Texas Hot Links	Roy	Eugene Lee	The Public Theater		
1996	Seven Guitars	Canewell	August Wilson	Walter Kerr Theatre, Broadway		
1997	Henry VIII	King Henry VIII	William Shakespeare	Delacorte Theater		
2001	Lackawanna Blues	Performer	Ruben Santiago-Hudson	The Public Theater		
2004	Gem of the Ocean	Caesar	August Wilson	Walter Kerr Theatre, Broadway		
2006	Seven Guitars	—N/a	August Wilson	Peter Norton Space	Director only	
2008	The First Breeze of Summer	—N/a	Leslie Lee	Peter Norton Space	Director only	
2009	Things of Dry Hours	—N/a	Naomi Wallace	New York Theatre Workshop	Director only	
2010	The Winter's Tale	Leontes	William Shakespeare	Delacorte Theater		
2011	Stick Fly	Joe Levay	Lydia R. Diamond	Cort Theatre, Broadway		
2012	My Children! My Africa!	—N/a	Athol Fugard	Pershing Square Signature Center	Director only	
2012	The Piano Lesson	—N/a	August Wilson	Pershing Square Signature Center	Director only	
2013	How I Learned What I Learned	Performer	August Wilson	Pershing Square Signature Center		
2014	The Happiest Song Plays Last	—N/a	Quiara Alegría Hudes	Second Stage Theater	Director only	
2016	Skeleton Crew	—N/a	Dominique Morisseau	Linda Gross Theater	Director only	
2017	Jitney	—N/a	August Wilson	Samuel J. Friedman Theatre, Broadway	Director only	
2018	Paradise Blue	—N/a	Dominique Morisseau	Pershing Square Signature Center	Director only	
2018	Othello	—N/a	William Shakespeare	Delacorte Theater	Director only	
2021	Lackawanna Blues	Performer	Ruben Santiago-Hudson	Samuel J. Friedman Theatre, Broadway	Also director	
2022	Skeleton Crew	—N/a	Dominique Morisseau	Samuel J. Friedman Theatre, Broadway	Director only	
2026	Joe Turner's Come and Gone	Bynum Walker	August Wilson	Ethel Barrymore Theatre, Broadway		

== Awards and nominations ==
Organizations	Year	Category	Work	Result	Ref.
Dorian Award	2026	Outstanding Featured Performance in a Broadway Play	Joe Turner's Come and Gone	Nominated	
Drama Desk Awards	1996	Outstanding Featured Actor in a Play	Seven Guitars	Nominated	
Drama Desk Awards	2001	Outstanding Solo Performance	Lackawanna Blues	Nominated	
Drama Desk Awards	2013	Outstanding Direction of a Play	The Piano Lesson	Nominated	
Drama Desk Awards	2014	Outstanding Solo Performance	How I Learned What I Learned	Nominated	
Drama Desk Awards	2017	Outstanding Direction of a Play	Jitney	Won	
Drama Desk Awards	2022	Outstanding Actor in a Play	Lackawanna Blues	Won	
Drama Desk Awards	2026	Outstanding Featured Performance in a Play	Joe Turner's Come and Gone	Won	
Drama League Award	2022	Distinguished Performance	Lackawanna Blues	Nominated	
Drama League Award	2026	Distinguished Performance	Joe Turner's Come and Gone	Nominated	
Humanitas Award	2005	90 Minute or Longer Network or Syndicated Television	Lackawanna Blues	Won	
Los Angeles NAACP Theatre Awards	2009	Lifetime Achievement Award	Himself	Honored	
Lucille Lortel Award	2024	Lifetime Achievement	Himself	Honored	
Obie Awards	2014	Outstanding Performance	How I Learned What I Learned	Nominated	
Obie Awards	2022	Outstanding Director of a Play	Skeleton Crew	Nominated	
Obie Awards	2022	Special Achievement Award	Himself	Honored	
Obie Awards	2026	Outstanding Featured Performer in a Broadway Play	Joe Turner's Come and Gone	Nominated	
Primetime Emmy Award	2005	Outstanding Television Movie	Lackawanna Blues	Nominated	
Producers Guild Award	2005	Best Long-Form Television	Lackawanna Blues	Nominated	
Tony Award	1996	Best Featured Actor in a Play	Seven Guitars	Won	
Tony Award	2017	Best Direction of a Play	Jitney	Nominated	
Tony Award	2022	Best Actor in a Play	Lackawanna Blues	Nominated	
Tony Award	2026	Best Featured Actor in a Play	Joe Turner's Come and Gone	Nominated	
Wayne State University	2022	Apple Award		Won	
Writers Guild Award	2005	Long Form – Adapted	Lackawanna Blues	Nominated	
Writers Guild Award	2021	Best Adapted Screenplay	Ma Rainey's Black Bottom	Nominated	

== See also ==
- List of famous Puerto Ricans
- List of Puerto Ricans of African descent
