= List of awards and nominations received by Aunjanue Ellis-Taylor =

Aunjanue Ellis-Taylor awards and nominations
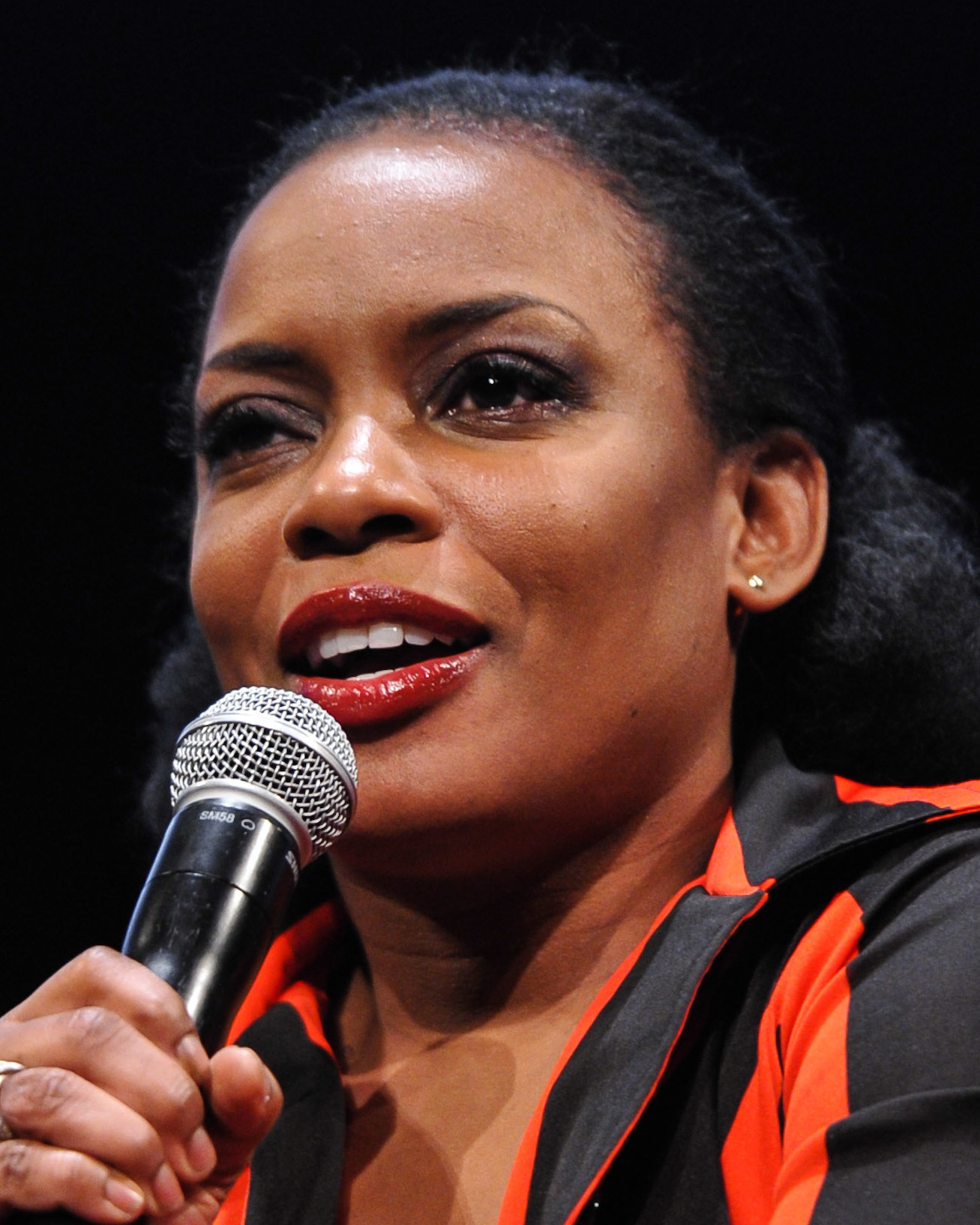
- Ellis-Taylor in 2015
Awards and nominations
Award	Wins	Nominations
Academy Awards	0	1
Actor Awards	0	4
BAFTA Awards	0	1
Critics' Choice Awards	0	5
Emmy Awards	0	2
Golden Globe Awards	0	1

Totals (Note: Certain award groups do not simply award one winner. They acknowledge several different recipients, have runners-up, and have third place. Since this is a specific recognition and is different from losing an award, runner-up mentions are considered wins in this award tally. For simplification and to avoid errors, each award in this list has been presumed to have had a prior nomination.)
- Wins: 24
- Nominations: 93

This is a list of awards and nominations received by American actress Aunjanue Ellis-Taylor.

A popular actress in numerous US television series and films in the late 1990s and early 2000s, Ellis gained international notoriety by starring in the film Ray (2004) directed by Taylor Hackford, for which she was nominated at the Actor Award for Outstanding Performance by a Cast in a Motion Picture. Later Ellis acted in several television critical acclaimed television series, including E-Ring, Justice, True Blood and The Mentalist.

After being cast in Academy Awards nominated film The Help, Ellis played Ann Pettway in television film Abducted: The Carlina White Story, winning the Black Reel Awards for Outstanding Actress, TV Movie/Limited Series. In 2014, she played the lead role in the film Of Mind and Music, receiving critical acclaim winning the American Black Film Festival Award for Best Actress.

In 2016, after taking part in Nate Parker's film The Birth of a Nation, Ellis starred in the drama miniseries The Book of Negroes. Her role was critically acclaimed, earning her nominations at the Critics' Choice Television Awards, NAACP Image Awards and Satellite Awards for Best Actress, winning the Canadian Screen Awards in the same category. Following Ellis starred in Barry Jenkins' Academy Awards-nominated film If Beale Street Could Talk (2018), receiving critical acclaim for her performance with the cast.

In 2019 Ellis played as Sharonne Salaam in the miniseries When They See Us, earning a nomination at Primetime Emmy Award for Outstanding Lead Actress in a Limited or Anthology Series or Movie. In 2020 she starred as Mattie Moss Clark in television film The Clark Sisters: First Ladies of Gospel and as Hippolyta Freeman in HBO serie Lovecraft Country, being nominated at the Primetime Emmy Award for Outstanding Supporting Actress in a Drama Series and Actor Award for Outstanding Performance by an Ensemble in a Drama Series.

In 2021 Ellis starred as Oracene "Brandy" Price critically acclaimed film King Richard, role that earned her her first nominations at the Academy Award for Best Supporting Actress and at the Golden Globe Award in the same category. Ellis was also awarded by the National Board of Review for Best Supporting Actress. Between 2023 and 2024 she acted as lead actress on Ava DuVernay film Origin and figures on the cast of the second film adaptation of The Color Purple, receiving a nomination with the cast at the Actor Awards and being honored at the Celebration of Cinema and Television. The following year, her performance as the mother of a boy at an abusive reform school in Nickel Boys earned her praise as well as a nomination for the Critics' Choice Movie Award for Best Supporting Actress.

== Major associations ==
=== Academy Awards ===
Year	Category	Work	Result	Ref.
2022	Best Supporting Actress	King Richard	Nominated	

=== Actor Awards ===
Year	Category	Work	Result	Ref.
2005	Outstanding Cast in a Motion Picture	Ray	Nominated	
2021	Outstanding Ensemble in a Drama Series	Lovecraft Country	Nominated	
2022	Outstanding Cast in a Motion Picture	King Richard	Nominated	
2024	Outstanding Cast in a Motion Picture	The Color Purple	Nominated	

=== BAFTA Awards ===
Year	Category	Work	Result	Ref.
British Academy Film Awards
2022	Best Actress in a Supporting Role	King Richard	Nominated	

=== Critics' Choice Awards ===
Year	Category	Work	Result	Ref.
Critics' Choice Movie Awards
2022	Best Supporting Actress	King Richard	Nominated	
2024	Best Acting Ensemble	The Color Purple	Nominated	
2025	Best Supporting Actress	Nickel Boys	Nominated	
Critics' Choice Television Awards
2015	Best Actress in a Movie or Miniseries	The Book of Negroes	Nominated	
2024	Best Actress in a Drama Series	Justified: City Primeval	Nominated	

=== Emmy Awards ===
Year	Category	Work	Result	Ref.
Primetime Emmy Awards
2019	Outstanding Lead Actress in a Limited Series or Movie	When They See Us	Nominated	
2021	Outstanding Supporting Actress in a Drama Series	Lovecraft Country	Nominated	

=== Golden Globe Awards ===
Year	Work	Category	Result	Ref.
2022	Best Supporting Actress – Motion Picture	King Richard	Nominated	

== Other awards ==
=== Black Reel Awards ===
Year	Category	Work	Result	Ref.
2003	Outstanding Actress	Undercover Brother	Nominated	
2013	Outstanding Actress, TV Movie or Limited Series	Abducted: The Carlina White Story	Won	
2016	Outstanding Actress, TV Movie or Limited Series	The Book of Negroes	Nominated	
2019	Outstanding Actress, TV Movie or Limited Series	When They See Us	Nominated	
2020	Outstanding Actress, TV Movie or Limited Series	The Clark Sisters: First Ladies of Gospel	Nominated	
2021	Outstanding Supporting Actress, Drama Series	Lovecraft Country	Nominated	
2022	Outstanding Supporting Actress	King Richard	Won	
2024	Outstanding Lead Performance	Origin	Nominated	
2024	Outstanding Lead Performance, Drama Series	Justified: City Primeval	Nominated	
2025	Outstanding Supporting Performance	Exhibiting Forgiveness	Nominated	
2025	Outstanding Supporting Performance	Nickel Boys	Nominated	

=== Canadian Screen Awards ===
Year	Category	Work	Result	Ref.
2016	Best Actress on Television	The Book of Negroes	Won	

=== Gotham Awards ===
Year	Category	Work	Result	Ref.
Film
2023	Outstanding Lead Performance	Origin	Nominated	
Television
2025	Outstanding Performance in an Original Film	The Supremes at Earl's All-You-Can-Eat	Nominated	

=== NAACP Image Awards ===
Year	Category	Work	Result	Ref.
2001	Outstanding Supporting Actress in a Motion Picture	Men of Honor	Nominated	
2010	Outstanding Actress in a Television Movie, Mini-Series or Dramatic Special	Gifted Hands: The Ben Carson Story	Nominated	
2016	Outstanding Actress in a Television Movie, Mini-Series or Dramatic Special	The Book of Negroes	Nominated	
2020	Outstanding Actress in a Television Movie, Mini-Series or Dramatic Special	When They See Us	Nominated	
2021	Outstanding Actress in a Television Movie, Mini-Series or Dramatic Special	The Clark Sisters: First Ladies of Gospel	Nominated	
2021	Outstanding Supporting Actress in a Drama Series	Lovecraft Country	Nominated	
2022	Outstanding Supporting Actress in a Motion Picture	King Richard	Nominated	
2024	Outstanding Actress in a Motion Picture	Origin	Nominated	
2024	Outstanding Ensemble Cast in a Motion Picture	The Color Purple	Won	
2025	Outstanding Supporting Actress in a Motion Picture	Exhibiting Forgiveness	Nominated	
2025	Outstanding Supporting Actress in a Motion Picture	Nickel Boys	Nominated	
2025	Outstanding Actress in a Television Movie, Mini-Series or Dramatic Special	The Supremes at Earl's All-You-Can-Eat	Nominated	

=== National Board of Review ===
Year	Category	Work	Result	Ref.
2021	Best Supporting Actress	King Richard	Won	

=== Satellite Awards ===
Year	Category	Work	Result	Ref.
2018	Best Actress – Miniseries or Television Film	The Book of Nergoes	Nominated	
2020	Best Actress – Miniseries or Television Film	When They See Us	Nominated	
2021	Best Supporting Actress – Motion Picture	King Richard	Nominated	

== Critics awards ==
Award	Year	Nominated work	Category	Result	Ref.
AARP Movies for Grownups Awards	2022	King Richard	Best Supporting Actress	Won	
AARP Movies for Grownups Awards	2024	Origin	Best Actress	Nominated	
AARP Movies for Grownups Awards	2024	The Color Purple	Best Ensemble	Won	
AARP Movies for Grownups Awards	2025	Nickel Boys	Best Supporting Actress	Nominated	
African-American Film Critics Association	2020	When They See Us	Best Ensemble	Won	
African-American Film Critics Association	2022	King Richard	Best Supporting Actress	Won	
African-American Film Critics Association	2024	Origin	Best Actress	Won	
African-American Film Critics Association	2024	The Color Purple	Best Ensemble	Won	
Alliance of Women Film Journalists	2022	King Richard	Best Supporting Actress	Nominated	
Alliance of Women Film Journalists	2025	Nickel Boys	Best Supporting Actress	Nominated	
American Black Film Festival	2015	Of Mind and Music	Best Actress	Won	
Astra Film Awards	2022	—N/a	Inspire Award	Won	
Astra Film Awards	2022	King Richard	Best Supporting Actress	Nominated	
Astra Film Awards	2024	The Color Purple	Best Cast Ensemble	Won	
Astra Film Awards	2025	Nickel Boys	Best Supporting Actress	Nominated	
Black Film Critics Circle	2021	King Richard	Best Supporting Actress	Won	
Celebration of Cinema and Television	2023	The Color Purple	Ensemble Award – Film	Won	
Celebration of Cinema and Television	2024	—N/a	Social Impact Award	Won	
Chicago Indie Critics	2025	Nickel Boys	Best Supporting Actress	Nominated	
Columbus Film Critics Association	2021	King Richard	Best Supporting Actress	Nominated	
Columbus Film Critics Association	2025	Nickel Boys	Best Supporting Performance	Nominated	
Dallas–Fort Worth Film Critics Association	2021	King Richard	Best Supporting Actress	Nominated	
Denver Film Society	2022	King Richard	Best Supporting Actress	Nominated	
Detroit Film Critics Society	2021	King Richard	Best Supporting Actress	Nominated	
DiscussingFilm Critics Awards	2022	King Richard	Best Supporting Actress	Nominated	
DiscussingFilm Critics Awards	2025	Nickel Boys	Best Supporting Actress	Nominated	
Florida Film Critics Circle	2024	Nickel Boys	Best Supporting Actress	Nominated	
Georgia Film Critics Association Awards	2024	The Color Purple	Best Ensemble	Nominated	
Georgia Film Critics Association Awards	2025	Nickel Boys	Best Supporting Actress	Nominated	
Gracie Awards	2016	The Book of Negroes	Outstanding Female in a Leading Role, TV Movie/Limited Series	Won	
Houston Film Critics Society	2021	King Richard	Best Supporting Actress	Nominated	
Las Vegas Film Critics Society	2023	The Color Purple	Best Ensemble	Nominated	
Los Angeles Film Critics Association	2021	King Richard	Best Supporting Actress	Runner-up	
National Society of Film Critics	2025	Nickel Boys	Best Supporting Actress	Runner-up	
Newport Beach Film Festival	2015	Of Mind and Music	Best Actress	Won	
North Carolina Film Critics Association	2025	Nickel Boys	Best Supporting Actress	Nominated	
North Texas Film Critics Association	2024	Nickel Boys	Best Supporting Actress	Nominated	
Online Film Critics Society	2022	King Richard	Best Supporting Actress	Nominated	
Online Film Critics Society	2025	Nickel Boys	Best Supporting Actress	Nominated	
Palm Springs International Film Festival	2022	King Richard	Ensemble Performance Award	Won	
SCAD Savannah Film Festival	2021	—N/a	Outstanding Achievement in Cinema Award	Won	
Seattle Film Critics Society	2018	If Beale Street Could Talk	Best Ensemble	Nominated	
Seattle Film Critics Society	2022	King Richard	Best Supporting Actress	Nominated	
St. Louis Gateway Film Critics Association	2021	King Richard	Best Supporting Actress	Nominated	
St. Louis Gateway Film Critics Association	2024	Nickel Boys	Best Supporting Actress	Won	
Washington D.C. Area Film Critics Association Awards	2018	If Beale Street Could Talk	Best Ensemble	Nominated	
Washington D.C. Area Film Critics Association Awards	2021	King Richard	Best Supporting Actress	Won	
Washington D.C. Area Film Critics Association Awards	2023	Origin	Best Actress	Nominated	
Washington D.C. Area Film Critics Association Awards	2024	Nickel Boys	Best Supporting Actress	Nominated	
Women Film Critics Circle	2018	If Beale Street Could Talk	Best Ensemble	Nominated	
Women Film Critics Circle	2023	Origin	Best Actress	Nominated	
