= The Supremes at Earl's All-You-Can-Eat (soundtrack) =

The Supremes at Earl's All-You-Can-Eat (Original Soundtrack)

Film score by Kathryn Bostic
- Released: August 23, 2024
- Recorded: 2024
- Genre: Film score
- Length: 23:22
- Label: Hollywood
- Producer: Kathryn Bostic

Kathryn Bostic chronology
Lift (2023)	The Supremes at Earl's All-You-Can-Eat (2024)	Marlee Matlin: Not Alone Anymore (2025)

The Supremes at Earl's All-You-Can-Eat (Original Soundtrack) is the film score composed by Kathryn Bostic to the 2024 film The Supremes at Earl's All-You-Can-Eat directed by Tina Mabry and stars Aunjanue Ellis-Taylor, Sanaa Lathan, Uzo Aduba, Mekhi Phifer, Julian McMahon, Vondie Curtis-Hall, and Russell Hornsby. The film score was released through Hollywood Records on August 23, 2024.

== Development ==
The score is composed by Kathryn Bostic who added that the music reflects the growing friendship between the three main characters; Clarice, Odette and Barbara-Jean as they explore challenges and triumphs within their own lives. Bostic was involved in the film, with only the script in hand which prompted her to think about music as a visual conversation, translating the emotional beats of the story into a soundscape. Bostic added that their friendship had communicated to her musically, which felt that it was difficult for being in touch from high school to adulthood, while further adding that it was their values for each other had superseded those challenges.

Mabry insisted Bostic to compose a piano theme that would be the central core for the characters' friendship. After composing three piano themes, Mabry chose the first one which Bostic considered her favorite. The theme which centered on Clarice served as the base for the entire score. This theme grows in variations and moods to reflect their personal catharsis that inevitably tests their friendship as well. Bostic overlayed it with a largely traditional orchestral score, which utilizes strings and piano in addition to bluesy guitar, vocal and bass motifs. Besides the score, Bostic also utilized musical pieces from the 1960s to pay homage to the blues and jazz music during that era.

== Release ==
The soundtrack was released through Hollywood Records on August 23, 2024.

== Reception ==
Robert Daniels of RogerEbert.com considered the score to be "melancholic", while Lisa Kennedy of Variety and Lovia Gyarkye of The Hollywood Reporter called the score "emotional" and "moving". Joe Hammerschmidt of Warm 106.9 wrote that Bostic's "efforts don't craft the film's tonality".

== Track listing ==
No.	Title	Length
1.	"Sycamore Tree"	1:10
2.	"Clarice"	1:41
3.	"Barbara Jean"	1:32
4.	"To the Supremes"	1:22
5.	"State of Grace" (Film Version)	2:50
6.	"Diagnosis"	1:03
7.	"Escape"	1:41
8.	"Missing Shoe"	2:56
9.	"Long Enough"	1:21
10.	"I'll Leave"	1:23
11.	"I Don't Work Without You"	1:30
12.	"Making Amends"	3:40
13.	"Ending Walk"	1:13
Total length:		23:22

== Accolades ==
Award	Date of ceremony	Category	Recipient(s) and nominee(s)	Result	Ref.
Black Reel Awards	August 18, 2025	Outstanding Musical Score	Kathryn Bostic	Nominated	
Guild of Music Supervisors Awards	February 23, 2025	Best Music Supervision for a Non-Theatrically Released Film	Robin Urdang	Nominated	
Hollywood Music In Media Awards	November 20, 2024	Original Score – TV/Streamed Movie	Kathryn Bostic	Won	
Primetime Creative Arts Emmy Awards	September 6–7, 2025	Outstanding Music Composition for a Limited or Anthology Series, Movie or Special (Original Dramatic Score)	Kathryn Bostic	Nominated	
