= Donna Biscoe =

American actress

- Born: Fort Benning, Georgia, U.S.
- Education: Clark Atlanta University
- Occupation: Actress
- Years active: 1987–present
- Website: donnabiscoe.com

Donna Biscoe is an American actress.

== Early years ==
Biscoe was born in Fort Benning, Georgia, the daughter of Mildred Skillern, a retired Carver High School English teacher. Biscoe attended Carver, then graduated from Kendrick High School in Columbus in 1973 and later graduated from Clark Atlanta University with a bachelor's degree in elementary education. Biscoe later went to Lee Strasberg Theatre and Film Institute in New York for six months.

In the 1980s, a casting agent discovered Biscoe while she worked as a flight attendant for Eastern Airlines.

== Career ==
After returning to Atlanta, Biscoe began acting in plays, including playing Martin Luther King Jr.’s mother in A Boy King at the Atlanta Children’s Theater. In late 1980s, Biscoe also began appearing in supporting roles in film and television, including four appearances in In the Heat of the Night, CBS miniseries Mama Flora's Family (1998), as well as films Love Crimes (1992) and Blue Sky (1994).

Biscoe worked mostly in theatre in 1980s and 1990s. Her stage credits including Doubt, To Kill A Mockingbird, Waiting to Be Invited, Holiday Heart, Homebody Kabul, Our Town and Fences. In 2000s, she began appearing in films playing mostly roles of mothers or grandmothers. Her film credits include Motives 2 and Three Can Play That Game (2007) starring Vivica A. Fox, Mississippi Damned (2009), The Sacrament (2013), The Hunger Games: Mockingjay – Part 1 (2014), and Girls Trip (2017). She played Taraji P. Henson's character's mother in the 2016 biographical drama film Hidden Figures, and Kevin Hart's mother in the 2018 comedy Night School.

On television, Biscoe guest-starred in Drop Dead Diva, Nashville and Being Mary Jane. She had recurring roles in the two Oprah Winfrey Network series: drama Greenleaf as Clara Jackson, and prime time soap opera Ambitions as Robin Givens' character's mother. In 2017, she began starring in the Bounce TV prime time soap opera Saints & Sinners playing villainous Lady Leona Byrd. The series ended in 2022 after six seasons. She later had recurring roles in All the Queen's Men, All Rise and Reasonable Doubt. In 2024 she starred alongside Garcelle Beauvais, Lela Rochon and Loretta Devine in the Lifetime television movie Terry McMillan Presents: Tempted By Love. She also appeared in the comedy-drama film The Supremes at Earl's All-You-Can-Eat and played Emma Derriecott in the war drama film, The Six Triple Eight.

== Other activities ==
In 2008, Biscoe ran a Pilates studio in downtown Atlanta.

== Filmography ==
=== Film ===
Year	Film	Role	Notes
1987	Kids Like These	Parent	Television film
1987	Dead Aim	Denise Long	
1988	Case Closed	Allison	Television film
1992	Grass Roots	Lisa Conroy	Television film
1992	In the Line of Duty: Street War	Mikey's Mom	Television film
1992	The Secret Passion of Robert Clayton	Heather	Television film
1992	Love Crimes	Hannah	
1993	Silent Victim	Beth Thompson	Television film
1993	I'll Fly Away: Then and Now	Adult Adlaine	Television film
1994	Blue Sky	Officer's Wife	
1994	Oldest Living Confederate Widow Tells All	Maynelle	Television film
1998	Mama Flora's Family	Jessica	Television miniseries
1999	The Simple Life of Noah Dearborn	Nurse	Television film
1999	The Price of a Broken Heart	Phyllis	Television film
2000	Freedom Song	Mrs. Summer	Television film
2000	Trois	Ms. Paul	
2002	Pandora's Box	Donna Paul	
2002	Nowhere Road		
2004	Trois 3: The Escort	Patricia Meyer	
2004	Dead Birds	Black Woman	
2004	Frankenfish	Gloria Crankton	
2005	The Gospel	Reverend Jones	
2005	A Message from Pops	Mom	Short film
2006	Broken Bridges	Dr. McVee	
2007	Daddy's Little Girls	Social Worker	
2007	Motives 2		
2007	Three Can Play That Game	Mrs. Thompson	
2008	One Missed Call	Coroner	
2008	Conjurer	Dr. McKenzie	
2009	Mississippi Damned	Gloria	
2010	Blood Done Sign My Name	Elizabeth Chavis	
2012	The Governor's Daughters	Ms. Anderson	
2013	The Sacrament	Wendy	
2014	Comeback Dad	Jeannette	
2014	The Hunger Games: Mockingjay – Part 1	D8 Old Woman	
2014	The Productive Lie	Niecy	
2015	Red All Over	Patricia Wright	
2016	The Fundamentals of Caring	Caregiving Instructor	
2016	Girl from Compton	Meme	
2016	Confirmation	Eleanor Holmes Norton	Television film
2016	Hidden Figures	Mrs. Joylette Coleman	
2017	Girls Trip	Delores	
2017	A Question of Faith	Patricia Newman	
2018	Along Came the Devil	Dr. Liles	
2018	The Beach House	Flo	Television film
2018	Night School	Gladys Walker	
2020	Black Girl Magic	Martha	
2022	The In Between	Doris	
2022	The Visitor	Margaret Delacroix	
2024	Freedom Hair	G'Mom	
2024	Terry McMillan Presents: Tempted by Love	Aunt Judy	
2024	The Supremes at Earl's All-You-Can-Eat	Minnie	
2024	A Very Merry Beauty Salon	Georgia	
2024	The Six Triple Eight	Emma Derriecott	
2025	Before You Let Go	Bea	Short film
2026	Strung	Charmaine Stewart	

=== Television ===
Year	Film	Role	Notes
1990-1993	In the Heat of the Night	Laura Ulmer / Mrs. Johnson / Cora Tyler	4 episodes
2008	Army Wives	Allison Lyall	Episode: "Payback"
2010	One Tree Hill	Judge	Episode: "Weeks Go by Like Days"
2012	Drop Dead Diva	Dr. Colette Willis	Episode: "Winning Ugly"
2013	Necessary Roughness	Felicia Purnell	Episode: "The Fall Guy"
2013	Nashville	Elizabeth	Episode: "A Picture from Life's Other Side"
2014	Star-Crossed	Gloria's Mother	Episodes: "Dreamers Often Lie" and "Our Toil Shall Strive to Mend"
2014	Rectify	Mrs. Whitman	Episode: "Donald the Normal"
2016-2020	Greenleaf	Clara Jackson	Recurring role, 10 episodes
2017	Being Mary Jane		Episode: "Getting Served"
2017	Shots Fired	Mabel	Episode: "Hour Four: Truth"
2017–2022	Saints & Sinners	Lady Leona Byrd	Recurring (season 2), Series regular (season 3-6), 33 episodes
2019	Jack Ryan	Yvonne Bishop	Episode: "Tertia Optio"
2019	Ambitions	Irene Carlisle	Recurring role, 9 episodes
2020	Outer Banks	Beck	Episode: "Dead Calm"
2021-2022	All the Queen's Men	Patrice Ellis	Recurring role, 7 episodes
2022	Ozark	Lori	Episodes: "City on the Make" and "Sanctified"
2022	Sweet Magnolias	Winell Martin	Episodes: "The Rules of the Game" and "Fragile Things"
2022	Woke	Annie Malone	Episode: "Black Trauma V"
2022	All Rise	Mildred Brewer	Episodes: "It Ain't Over Till It's Over" and "Trouble Man"
2024	Reasonable Doubt	Mavis Tucker-Jones	Episodes: "Can I Live?" and "This Can't Be Life"
