= The Clark Sisters: First Ladies of Gospel =

American biographical film

- The official poster for The Clark Sisters: First Ladies of Gospel
- Written by: Sylvia L. Jones; and Camille Tucker
- Directed by: Christine Swanson
- Starring: Christina Bell; Angela Birchett; Sheléa Frazier; Raven Goodwin; Kierra Sheard; Aunjanue Ellis; Demore Barnes; Michael Xavier; Romaine Waite; Ronnie Rowe Jr.
- Country of origin: United States
- Original language: English

Production
- Producers: Queen Latifah; Mary J. Blige; Missy Elliott

Original release
- Network: Lifetime
- Release: April 11, 2020

The Clark Sisters: First Ladies of Gospel is a 2020 American biographical film about gospel group The Clark Sisters. Directed by Christine Swanson, and co-written by Sylvia L. Jones and Camille Tucker, the film stars Christina Bell, Kierra Sheard, Sheléa Frazier, Raven Goodwin, and Angela Birchett. It premiered on Lifetime on April 11, 2020.

== Plot ==
The film centers on the formation of gospel group The Clark Sisters, the daughters and pupils of gospel singer and devout Christian Mattie Moss Clark. The plot follows their journey from their hometown of Detroit to becoming the highest-selling gospel group in music history.

== Cast ==
- Christina Bell as Elbernita "Twinkie" Clark, the one leader of The Clark Sisters
- Angela Birchett as Jacky Clark-Chisholm, the one member of The Clark Sisters
- Sheléa Frazier as Dorinda Clark-Cole, the four member of The Clark Sisters
- Raven Goodwin as Denise Clark-Bradford, the two member of The Clark Sisters
- Kierra Sheard as Karen Clark-Sheard, the five member of The Clark Sisters
- Aunjanue Ellis as Dr. Mattie Moss-Clark, the mother of Jacky, Denise, Twinkie, Dorinda & Karen
- Demore Barnes as Elbert Clark, the father of Denise, Twinkie, Dorinda & Karen and stepfather of Jacky
- Michael Xavier as J. Drew Sheard, Karen's husband
- Romaine Waite as Greg Cole, Dorinda's husband
- Ronnie Rowe Jr. as John
- Saad Siddiqui as Reza

== Production ==
On March 27, 2019, it was announced that Queen Latifah's Flavor Unit Productions had greenlit the film to be released in 2020. Queen Latifah, Mary J. Blige, Missy Elliott, Loretha Jones and Holly Carter served as executive producers for the film.

The Clark Sisters: First Ladies of Gospel is the first authorized biopic about the group. The producers noted in an interview at the 2020 TCA press tour that estranged sister Denise Clark-Bradford was invited to be a part of the film but did not state the extent of her involvement.

The film was directed by Christine Swanson and written by Sylvia L. Jones and Camille Tucker, who wrote the story. Kierra Sheard portrayed her real-life mother, Karen Clark Sheard.

== Soundtrack ==
No.	Title	Writer(s)	Performer(s)	Length
1.	"The Beginning (Spoken Word)"		Aunjanue Ellis & Cast	1:39
2.	"What He’s Done for Me"	Mattie Moss Clark	Christina Bell, Kierra Sheard, Sheléa Frazier, Raven Goodwin & Angela Birchett	2:33
3.	"In the Studio (Spoken Word)"		Aunjanue Ellis & Sheléa Frazier	0:21
4.	"If You Can’t Take It, You Sure Can’t Make It"	Leva Mae Penniman	Christina Bell, Kierra Sheard, Sheléa Frazier, Raven Goodwin & Angela Birchett	2:03
5.	"Karen Finds Her Voice (Spoken Word)"		Aunjanue Ellis, Kierra Sheard & Cast	0:29
6.	"I Can Do All Things Thru Christ That Strengthens Me"	Twinkie Clark	Kierra Sheard & Dorinda Clark-Cole	2:27
7.	"Twinkie Takes Over (Spoken Word)"		Aunjanue Ellis & Christina Bell	0:30
8.	"Praying Spirit"	Twinkie Clark	Christina Bell, Kierra Sheard, Sheléa Frazier, Raven Goodwin & Angela Birchett	3:58
9.	"Nothing to Lose, All to Gain"	Twinkie Clark	Christina Bell, Kierra Sheard, Sheléa Frazier, Raven Goodwin & Angela Birchett	4:17
10.	"Crossover (Spoken Word)"		Aunjanue Ellis, Christina Bell, Kierra Sheard, Sheléa Frazier, Raven Goodwin & Angela Birchett	0:46
11.	"You Brought the Sunshine"	Twinkie Clark	Christina Bell, Kierra Sheard, Sheléa Frazier, Raven Goodwin & Angela Birchett	4:11
12.	"Name It Claim It"	Twinkie Clark	Christina Bell, Kierra Sheard, Sheléa Frazier, Raven Goodwin & Angela Birchett	2:32
13.	"Name It Claim It (Dorinda’s Sermonette) [Spoken Word]"		Sheléa Frazier	1:22

Notes

- All songs produced by Donald Lawrence.
- Other songs performed in the film but not included on the soundtrack are "Hallelujah," "Is My Living in Vain," "Miracle" (a reworked version of The Clark Sisters' earlier "Expect Your Miracle" on their album of the same name), and the Karen Clark Sheard-penned "Blessed & Highly Favored."

=== Charts ===
Chart (2020)	Peak position
US Top Gospel Albums (Billboard)	8

The soundtrack album debuted at number eight on the Billboard Top Gospel Albums chart, where it remained in its second week. In its third week, the album slipped to number 23.

== Release ==
The film premiered on Lifetime on April 11, 2020.

== Reception ==
The Clark Sisters: First Ladies of Gospel premiere was the most-watched film on Lifetime in four years with 2.7 million viewers.

The film received mixed critical reception. In a review for rogerebert.com, Nell Minow rated the film 3.5/4 stars, calling Ellis's performance "mesmerizing" and the music "a gorgeous, spirit-lifting celestial chorus." Joelle Monique of The A.V. Club rated the film a C+ and wrote in the review, "...it feels like a chorus of Clark sisters, each with their interpretation of events, presented in a way that wouldn’t offend anyone person in the group." Writing for The Root, Panama Jackson stated in a more positive review: "It’s both heartwarming and endearing, while not skirting any of the issues that plagued their ultimately triumphant and still ongoing journey: domestic violence, gender inequality in the church, interpersonal issues, medical issues, mental health, life, etc."

== Awards and nominations ==
Year	Award	Category	Nominee(s)	Result	Ref.
2021	Black Reel Awards	Outstanding Television Movie or Limited Series	The Clark Sisters: First Ladies of Gospel	Nominated	
2021	Black Reel Awards	Outstanding Actress, TV Movie/Limited Series	Aunjanue Ellis	Nominated	
2021	Black Reel Awards	Outstanding Supporting Actress, TV Movie/Limited Series	Raven Goodwin	Nominated	
2021	Black Reel Awards	Outstanding Director, TV Movie/Limited Series	Christine Swanson	Nominated	
2021	Black Reel Awards	Outstanding Writing, TV Movie/Limited Series	Sylvia L. Jones and Camille Tucker	Nominated	
2021	Critics' Choice Television Awards	Best Television Movie	The Clark Sisters: First Ladies of Gospel	Nominated	
2021	Make-Up Artists and Hair Stylists Guild Awards	Best Television Special, One Hour or More Live Program Series or Movie for Television – Best Period and/or Character Make-Up	LaLette Littlejohn, Christopher Pizzarelli and Dorota Zajac	Nominated	
2021	Make-Up Artists and Hair Stylists Guild Awards	Best Television Special, One Hour or More Live Program Series or Movie for Television – Best Period and/or Character Hair Styling	Etheline Joseph, Yasmine Crosdale and Tenika Smith	Nominated	
2021	NAACP Image Awards	Outstanding Television Movie, Mini-Series or Dramatic Special	The Clark Sisters: First Ladies of Gospel	Nominated	
2021	NAACP Image Awards	Outstanding Actress in a Television Movie, Mini-Series or Dramatic Special	Aunjanue Ellis	Nominated	
2021	NAACP Image Awards	Outstanding Directing in a Television Movie, Mini-Series or Dramatic Special	Christine Swanson	Nominated	
2021	NAACP Image Awards	Outstanding Writing in a Television Movie, Mini-Series or Dramatic Special	Sylvia L. Jones and Camille Tucker	Nominated	
2021	Satellite Awards	Best Television Film	The Clark Sisters: First Ladies of Gospel	Won	
