= 13th Annual Black Reel Awards =

Film-industry awards in 2013

13th Black Reel Awards
- Date: February 7, 2013
- Location: Washington, D.C.

The 2013 Black Reel Awards, which annually recognize and celebrate the achievements of black people in feature, independent and television films, took place in Harlem, New York on February 7, 2013. Middle of Nowhere lead the pack with 9 nominations and Steel Magnolias lead the television nominees with 7. Over 25 categories were announced this year. Previously retired categories that returned included: Outstanding Voice Performance, Outstanding Supporting Actor & Actress in a TV Movie, Outstanding Directing & Writing in a TV Movie/Mini-Series. Whitney Houston earned a posthumous nomination in the Outstanding Song category for her duet with Jordin Sparks in the film Sparkle.

Beasts of the Southern Wild was the big winner in the motion picture category taking home four awards including Outstanding Picture and Actress (Quvenzhané Wallis). Django Unchained came a close second with three wins including one for Outstanding Supporting Actor (Samuel L. Jackson). Abducted: The Carlina White Story was the biggest winner in the television category with four wins. In a surprise win, TV One's A Beautiful Soul pulled in upset win for Outstanding Television Movie over heavily nominated TV movies Steel Magnolias and Raising Izzie.

Quvenzhané Wallis and Ava DuVernay were multiple winners each winning two awards.

== Winners and nominees ==
Winners are listed first and highlighted in bold.

Best Film	Best Director
**Beasts of the Southern Wild**; Django Unchained; Flight; The Intouchables; Middle of Nowhere	**Ava DuVernay** – Middle of Nowhere; Salim Akil – Sparkle; Spike Lee – Red Hook Summer; Peter Ramsey – Rise of the Guardians; Tim Story – Think Like a Man
Best Actor	Best Actress
**Denzel Washington – Flight**; Jamie Foxx – Django Unchained; Nate Parker – Red Tails; Chris Rock – 2 Days in New York; Omar Sy – The Intouchables	**Quvenzhané Wallis – Beasts of the Southern Wild**; Halle Berry – Cloud Atlas; Emayatzy Corinealdi – Middle of Nowhere; Viola Davis – Won't Back Down; Rashida Jones – Celeste and Jesse Forever
Best Supporting Actor	Best Supporting Actress
**Samuel L. Jackson – Django Unchained**; Mike Epps – Sparkle; Dwight Henry – Beasts of the Southern Wild; David Oyelowo – Middle of Nowhere; Nate Parker – Arbitrage	**Naomie Harris – Skyfall**; Octavia Spencer – Smashed; Tamara Tunie – Flight; Lorraine Toussaint – Middle of Nowhere; Kerry Washington – Django Unchained
Best Breakthrough Performance	Best Ensemble (Awarded to Casting Directors)
**Quvenzhané Wallis – Beasts of the Southern Wild**; Emayatzy Corinealdi – Middle of Nowhere; Dwight Henry – Beasts of the Southern Wild; Amandla Stenberg – The Hunger Games; Omar Sy – The Intouchables	**Victoria Thomas – Django Unchained**; Victoria Burrows – Flight; Tracy Byrd – Sparkle; Aisha Coley – Middle of Nowhere; Kimberly Hardin – Think Like a Man
Best Original or Adapted Song
**"Who Did That to You?" from Django Unchained – Performed by John Legend**; "Carry It" from The Man with the Iron Fists – Performed by Travis Barker, RZA, Tom Morello and Raekwon; "Celebrate" from Sparkle – Performed by Jordin Sparks and Whitney Houston; "No Church in the Wild" from Safe House – Performed by Jay Z, Kanye West and Frank Ocean; "Tonight (Best You Ever Had)" from Think Like a Man – Performed by John Legend and Ludacris
Outstanding Original Score	Best Voice Performance
**Dan Romer and Benh Zeitlin – Beasts of the Southern Wild**; Terence Blanchard – Red Tails; Kathryn Bostic – Middle of Nowhere; Bruce Hornsby – Red Hook Summer; Salaam Remi – Sparkle	**Dennis Haysbert – Wreck-It Ralph**; Tempestt Bledsoe – ParaNorman; Queen Latifah – Ice Age: Continental Drift; Chris Rock – Madagascar 3: Europe's Most Wanted; Wanda Sykes – Ice Age: Continental Drift
Best Screenplay, Adapted or Original	Best Independent Short
**Ava DuVernay – Middle of Nowhere**; Mara Brock Akil – Sparkle; Rashida Jones and Will McCormack – Celeste and Jesse Forever; Spike Lee and James McBride – Red Hook Summer; Aaron McGruder and John Ridley – Red Tails	**The Bluest Note – Maruqes Green**; Crossover – Tina Mabry; Last/First Kiss – Andrea Ashton; Record/Play – Jesse Atlas; White Space – Maya Washington
Best Feature Documentary	Best Independent Documentary
**The Central Park Five – Ken Burns, Sarah Burns and David McMahon**; Bad 25 – Spike Lee; Brooklyn Castle – Katie Dallamaggiore; Marley – Kevin MacDonald; Searching for Sugar Man – Malik Bendjelloul	**Soul Food Junkies – Byron Hurt**; BMF: The Rise and Fall of Hip-Hop Drug Empire – Dan Sikorski; Contradictions of Fair Hope – S. Epatha Merkerson and Rockell Metcalf; From Fatherless to Fatherhood – Kobie Brown; Justice for Sale – Femeke and Isla van Velzen
Best Independent Feature	Best Foreign Film
**LUV – Sheldon Candis**; Elza – Mariette Monpierre; Four – Joshua Sanchez; The Last Fall – Matthew A. Cherry; Yelling to the Sky – Victoria Mahoney	**The Intouchables (France) – Éric Toledano and Olivier Nakache**; Elza (France) – Mariette Monpierre; Ties That Bind (Ghana) – Leila Djansi; Toussaint Louverture (France) – Philippe Niang; Wuthering Heights (U.K.) – Andrea Arnold
Best Television Documentary or Special	Best Television Miniseries or Movie
**Nelson George and Diane Paragas – Brooklyn Boheme (Showtime)**; Mark Ford – Uprising: Hip-Hop and the LA Riots (VH1); Nelson George – The Announcement (ESPN); Deobrah Morales – On the Shoulders of Giants (Showtime); Samuel D. Pollard – Slavery by Another Name (PBS)	**A Beautiful Soul (TV One) – Holly Carter and Dominique Telson**; Let It Shine (Disney Channel) – Amy Gibbons and Paul Hoen; Raising Izzie (UP) – Angelique Bones; Somebody's Child (UP) – David Eubanks, Keith Neal and Eric Tomosunas; Steel Magnolias (Lifetime) – Neil Meron and Craig Zadan
Best Actor in a TV Movie or Limited Series	Best Actress in a TV Movie or Limited Series
**Sean Patrick Thomas – Murder on the 13th Floor (Lifetime)**; Rockmond Dunbar – Raising Izzie (UP); Cuba Gooding Jr. – Firelight (ABC); Trevor Jackson – Let It Shine (Disney Channel); Michael Jai White – Somebody's Child (UP)	**Aunjanue Ellis – Abducted: The Carlina White Story (Lifetime)**; Queen Latifah – Steel Magnolias (Lifetime); Keke Palmer – Abducted: The Carlina White Story (Lifetime); Lynn Whitfield – Somebody's Child (UP); Vanessa A. Williams – Raising Izzie (UP)
Best Supporting Actor in a TV Movie or Limited Series	Best Supporting Actress in a TV Movie or Limited Series
**Courtney B. Vance – Let It Shine (Disney Channel)**; Danny Glover – Hannah's Law (Hallmark); Louis Gossett Jr. – Smitty (UP); Boris Kodjoe – A Killer Amongst Us (Lifetime); Harry Lennix – A Beautiful Soul (TV One)	**Alfre Woodard – Steel Magnolias (Lifetime)**; Adepero Oduye – Steel Magnolias (Lifetime); Phylicia Rashad – Steel Magnolias (Lifetime); Gloria Reuben – Jesse Stone: Benefit of the Doubt (CBS); Jill Scott – Steel Magnolias (Lifetime)
Outstanding Director in a Television Miniseries or Movie	Outstanding Screenplay in a TV Movie or Limited Series
**Vondie Curtis-Hall – Abducted: The Carlina White Story (Lifetime)**; Roger M. Bobb – Raising Izzie (UP); Kenny Leon – Steel Magnolias (Lifetime); Darnell Martin – Firelight (ABC); Bille Woodruff – Rags (Nickelodeon)	**Elizabeth Hunter – Abducted: The Carlina White Story (Lifetime)**; Eric Daniel – Let It Shine (Disney Channel); David Martyn Conley – Raising Izzie (UP); Siddeeqah Powell – Somebody's Child (UP); Cas Sigers – A Cross to Bear (UP)

== Highlights ==
- Beasts of the Southern Wild became the big winner with 4 wins. Abducted: The Carlina White Story and Django Unchained took home 3 awards.
- Ava DuVernay became the second woman to win in the Best Director category. Gina Prince-Bythewood became the first.
- John Legend, Vondie Curtis-Hall and Alfre Woodard became the first multiple winners in their respective categories (Best Song/Best Director: TV Movie/ Best Supporting Actress: TV Movie).
- Quvenzhané Wallis continued her history making film career in becoming the youngest Best Actress and Breakthrough winner ever.
- Denzel Washington continues his winning streak in the Best Actor category with four Best Actor wins.
- Earning their first Black Reel Award were: Paul Epworth, Behn Zeitlin, Ava DuVernay, Quvenzhané Wallis, Aunjanue Ellis, Sean Patrick Thomas, Elizabeth Hunter, Dan Romer, Samuel L. Jackson, Victoria Thomas, Courtney B. Vance, Nelson George, Sarah Burns, Ken Burns, Diane Gargas and Sheldon Candis,
