= Black Art: In the Absence of Light =

2021 American documentary film

- Official poster
- Directed by: Sam Pollard
- Produced by: Sam Pollard; Daphne McWilliams
- Cinematography: Henry Adebonjo
- Edited by: Steve Wechsler
- Music by: Kathryn Bostic
- Production companies: HBO Documentary Films; Two Dollars and a Dream
- Distributed by: HBO
- Release date: February 9, 2021 (United States)
- Running time: 85 minutes
- Country: United States
- Language: English

Black Art: In the Absence of Light is a 2021 American documentary film, directed and produced by Sam Pollard. The film follows various Black American artists and their contributions to the art world.

The film was released on February 9, 2021, by HBO.

== Synopsis ==
The film begins and then returns to focus on the landmark exhibition Two Centuries of Black American Art curated by David Driskell at the Los Angeles County Museum of Art (LACMA) in Los Angeles, California, and then goes on to follow various Black American artists and their contributions to the art world and before and since the watershed survey.

Radcliffe Bailey, Sanford Biggers, Jordan Casteel, David Driskell, Theaster Gates, Lyle Ashton Harris, Glenn Ligon, Kerry James Marshall, Richard Mayhew, Faith Ringgold, Betye Saar, Amy Sherald, Hank Willis Thomas, Kara Walker, Carrie Mae Weems, and Kehinde Wiley appear in the documentary.

Driskell died before the production's release and a posthumous dedication is made to him at the end of the film.

== Release ==
The film was released on February 9, 2021, by HBO.

== Reception ==
=== Critical reception ===
Black Art: In the Absence of Light received positive reviews from film critics. The review aggregator website Rotten Tomatoes surveyed 12 critics and, categorizing the reviews as positive or negative, assessed 11 as positive and one as negative for a 92% rating. Among the reviews, it determined an average rating of 6.80 out of 10. On Metacritic, the film holds a rating of 73 out of 100, based on four critics, indicating "generally favorable" reviews.
