= Romaine Waite =

Canadian actor

- Born: Montego Bay, Jamaica
- Occupation: Actor
- Years active: 2009–present
- Known for: The Mist; Star Trek: Discovery

Romaine Waite is a Canadian actor. His most notable works include The Mist and Star Trek: Discovery.

== Early life ==
Waite was born in Montego Bay, Jamaica. He moved to Canada and spent his adolescent years in Brampton, Ontario.

== Career ==
Waite's acting career began with short and independent films. He had supporting roles on Murdoch Mysteries (TV Series, CBC, 2016) alongside Yannick Bisson, Taken (TV Series, NBC, 2018) alongside Jennifer Beals, and Private Eyes with Jason Priestley.

On the big screen, he portrayed Greg Cole in the Lifetime movie The Clark Sisters: First Ladies of Gospel (2020), Steve McDonald in the horror film Antisocial (2013) and John Burke in the action crime comedy-drama film Scratch (2014). He has also worked with Gerard Butler in A Family Man (2016). In addition, Waite has been a part of live stage performances, including as Aaron Levinsky in Nuts (2014) and Rick in Killcreek (2013).

== Filmography ==
Year	Title	Role	Note
2009	A Man of Principals	Jeff	TV miniseries
2011	Poser	Logan Mitioner (in six episodes)	TV series
2011	The Trouble with the Next Day	Ben	Short film
2012	Pawn Takes Knight	Sebastian	Short film
2013	Volition	Samuels	Short film
2013	One Night a Stranger	Brian	Short film
2013	Rats	Benz	Short film
2013	Antisocial	Steve	Film
2013	My Favourite Thing		Short film
2014	Separation Anxiety	Joe	Film
2014	Someone Not There	Roland (in five episodes)	TV miniseries
2014	Bubble Gum Scented Urinal Cakes	Cody	Short film
2014	Scratch	John Burke	Film
2015	The Strain	Tom Perry (in one episode)	TV series
2015	Rogue	CDW&P Guy (in one episode)	TV series
2015	Heroes Reborn	Detective (in one episode)	TV miniseries
2015	Holtered	Taven	Short film
2015-2016	Beauty and the Beast	Paramedic (in "Down for the Count") and Officer #1 (in "Both Sides Now")	TV series
2016	Murdoch Mysteries	Pastor Solomon Earle (in one episode)	TV series
2016	12 Monkeys	Server (in one episode)	TV series
2016	A Perfect Christmas	Richard	TV film
2016	A Family Man	Recruiter #2	Film
2016	Carbon Copy	Mark Ranger	Film
2017	Air Crash Investigation	First Officer Plesel (in one episode)	TV documentary series
2017	Schitt's Creek	Motel Guest (in one episode)	TV series
2017	Private Eyes	Jerry Macklehearn (in one episode)	TV series
2017	The Mist	Kyle (in nine episodes)	TV series
2017	The Girlfriend Experience	Kevin Deckert	TV series
2017-2018	Star Trek: Discovery	Troy Januzzi (in four episodes)	TV series
2017-2021	Frankie Drake Mysteries	Bill Peters (in nine episodes)	TV series
2018	Taken	Langston (in one episode)	TV series
2018	52 Words for Love	Andrew	Film
2018	The Holiday Calendar	Mitch	Film
2018	36 Hammond Drive	Nathan	Short film Also producer, writer and director
2019	Little Dog	Kevin Smallwood (in seven episodes)	TV series
2019	Shadowhunters: The Mortal Instruments	Griffin (in two episodes)	TV series
2019	Crossword Mysteries: Proposing Murder	Winston	TV film
2019	The Crossword Mysteries: Abracadaver	Winston	TV film
2019	Dead Weight		Short film Only co-producer
2020	The Detectives	Detective Conan Lawson (in one episode)	TV documentary series
2020	The Clark Sisters: First Ladies of Gospel	Greg Cole	TV film
2020	As Gouda as it Gets	Tim	TV film
2021	SurrealEstate	Leon (in one episode)	TV series
2021	Saying Yes to Christmas	Blake Harris	TV film
2022	Two Sentence Horror Stories	Montrell Davis (in one episode)	TV series
2022	Albatross	Thomas Miller	Film
2022	Departure	Ziggy Reynard (in four episodes)	TV series
2022	A New Diva's Christmas Carol	Michael	TV film
2023	Love Hacks	Josh Wheeler	TV film
2023	Sister Dating Swap	Ryan	TV film
2024	Jingle All The Way To Love	Jake - main role	TV film
2026	Bee My Love	Casey	TV film
TBA	Salvage	Homeless Man	Film; Also producer
TBA	Usher, the Usher	Usher	Film
