= Mississippi Damned =

2009 film by Tina Mabry

- Theatrical release poster
- Directed by: Tina Mabry
- Written by: Tina Mabry
- Produced by: Lee V. Stiff; Morgan R. Stiff
- Starring: Adam Clark; Malcolm Goodwin; Michael Hyatt
- Cinematography: Bradford Young
- Edited by: Morgan R. Stiff
- Music by: Ryan Adison Amen
- Production company: Morgan's Mark
- Release date: January 16, 2009 (Slamdance Film Festival)
- Running time: 120 minutes
- Country: United States
- Language: English

Mississippi Damned is a 2009 American drama film written and directed by Tina Mabry and starring Tessa Thompson, D. B. Woodside, Malcolm Goodwin, Malcolm David Kelley and Michael Hyatt. The film was based on Mabry's life growing up in Tupelo, Mississippi. It was filmed in and around Ahoskie, North Carolina. Based on a true story, three poor black kids in rural Mississippi reap the consequences of their family's cycle of physical and sexual abuse, addiction, and violence. They independently struggle to escape their circumstances and must decide whether to confront what's plagued their family for generations or succumb to the same crippling fate, forever damned in Mississippi.

== Plot ==
In 1986, teenage cousins Leigh and Sammy, and Leigh's younger sister Kari, watch as their mothers and aunts struggle to maintain a roof over their heads. Leigh, a closeted lesbian, is devastated when her girlfriend announces she is marrying a man. Leigh attacks him and is arrested and kicked out of her parents' house. Sammy, a talented basketball player, is sexually abused by an older man. He accepts pay for sexual acts in order to get the money he needs to support his burgeoning basketball career. After Sammy's mother stabs her boyfriend's lover and is arrested, Sammy is taken in by his aunt. He rapes his younger cousin Kari, Leigh's sister.

By 1998, the three characters are adults. Leigh is still hung up on her old girlfriend and continues to make unwelcome visits to her. Sammy, a former professional basketball player, is out of work due to an injury. His pride and previous fame make him reluctant to take the minimum wage job he needs to support his wife and child. Kari, a talented pianist who has delayed college for years to take care of her cancer-stricken mother, is waiting to hear if she has been accepted by a musical conservatory. As she struggles to save money for school, she feels bound by family and friends, most of whom have no money to lend her or are financially dependent on her.

She eventually turns to Sammy for money. Although he gives it to her, she is disgusted and ashamed for having asked him. Sammy, feeling rejected by his wife, begins to seduce his son's underage teenage babysitter. When he is caught by his wife, she contacts the police. He commits suicide.

Kari eventually learns that her mother's cancer has returned and her father has been laid off work. She gives her parents Sammy's money and decides not to go to school. When she tells her aunt of her decision, her aunt urges her to go, warning her that if she does not leave now she is unlikely to ever go. Kari learns that she has been accepted to school in New York City. Shortly after, she discovers that her aunt has died, leaving her $25,000 in life insurance for school. Kari realizes that her aunt committed suicide by ceasing to take her diabetes medication. Kari packs up her things and leaves Mississippi, heading north toward school.

== Cast ==
- Tonea Stewart as Alice
- Adam Clark as Junior Peterson
- Michael Hyatt as Delores Peterson
- Chasity Kershal Hammitte as Leigh Peterson
- Kylee Russell as Young Kari Peterson
- Tessa Thompson as Kari Peterson
- Jossie Harris as Charlie Stone
- Malcolm David Kelley as Young Sammy
- Malcolm Goodwin as Sammy Stone
- Cynthia Addai-Robinson as Milena Stone
- Simbi Khali as Anna Tensely
- D.B. Woodside as Tyrone Tensely
- Michael Beasley as James
- Donna Biscoe as Gloria
- Southey Blanton as Irv
- Benjamin Brown as Ray

== Reception ==
=== Critical response ===
When the film was screened at the NewFest film festival in New York City, Variety film critic Ronnie Scheib, praised the film, writing, "For the black men, women and children in Mississippi Damned, Tina Mabry's autobiographical saga of intertwined destinies, that southern state epitomizes a domestic hell of borderline poverty and endemic abuse. Complex family trees sometimes make for tough narrative sledding, but the thicket of obligations, traumas and betrayals that entrap the 'damned' here are well worth any momentary confusion. Mabry brilliantly captures a community as organic as it is dead-end, and the tortured legacy behind simplistic notions of ever escaping it. The NewFest audience award-winner demands strong critical support to overcome its downbeat subject matter and lack of a star draw."

The Philadelphia Inquirer film critic, Steven Rea, lauded the actors, writing, "Kelley (Walt Lloyd in Lost), Jasmin Burke and Jossie Thacker are among the busy ensemble whose exceptionally fine performances elevate what could have been a pile-it-on melodrama into something deeper and more unsettling."

=== Accolades ===
==== Wins ====
- American Black Film Festival: Grand Jury Prize, Best Actor, Tessa Thompson; Best Narrative Feature; 2009.
- Atlanta Film Festival: Special Jury Award, Narrative Breakthrough; 2009.
- Black Reel Awards: Black Reel, Outstanding Independent Feature, Tina Mabry; 2009.
- Chicago International Film Festival: Gold Hugo, Best Film; Gold Plaque, Best Screenplay, Tina Mabry; Best Supporting Actress, Jossie Thacker; 2009.
- New York Lesbian, Gay, Bisexual, & Transgender Film Festival: Audience Award, Narrative Feature; 2009.
- Outfest: Grand Jury Award, Outstanding US Dramatic Feature; 2009.
- Philadelphia Film Festival: Jury Award, Best American Independent Film; 2009.

=== Distribution ===
Despite a successful festival run, the film was unable to find distribution. The producer distributed it into a few theatres. In 2011, it premiered on Showtime, and in 2015, it was made available through Netflix via distributor ARRAY.
