= Kathryn Bostic =

American composer and musical artist

- Genres: Film score, orchestral
- Occupation: Composer · Vocalist · Songwriter
- Years active: 2001–present
- Website: kathrynbostic.com

Kathryn Bostic is an American composer and artist known for her work on award-winning films, TV, and theater. In 2016, she became the first female African-American score composer to join the Academy of Motion Picture Arts and Sciences, and was the vice president of the Alliance for Women Film Composers from 2016 to 2018.

== Work ==
Bostic has written scores and songs for film, television and stage, including award-winning films Toni Morrison: The Pieces I Am and Amy Tan: Unintended Memoir, for which she received an Emmy Award nomination. Bostic also wrote and performed the Toni Morrison: The Pieces I Am end-title song, "High Above the Water”, which was shortlisted for "Best Original Song” at the 2020 Oscars. Bostic's scores also include Sundance award-winning film Clemency (on which she also served as an Executive Producer), Rita Moreno: Just a Girl Who Decided to Go for It, HBO documentary Black Art: In the Absence of Light, and most recently, ABC's limited series Women of the Movement from Emmy-nominated showrunner, Marissa Jo Cerar.

Kathryn Bostic's compositions have been performed by the Los Angeles Philharmonic, the Pittsburgh Symphony Orchestra, and the Bangor Symphony Orchestra. She is the first artist-in-residence for the MacArthur Award-winning Chicago Sinfonietta.

Bostic has also written for Broadway, most notably collaborating with the award-winning playwright August Wilson on Gem of the Ocean, various productions of his last play Radio Golf, and the Mark Taper production of Joe Turner's Come and Gone directed by Phylicia Rashad. Consequently, Bostic was asked to score the PBS American Masters program August Wilson: The Ground On Which I Stand, which ultimately inspired her composition "The Great Migration - A Symphony in Celebration of August Wilson", which received its world premiere in January 2018 by the Grammy award-winning Pittsburgh Symphony Orchestra. Bostic's work on Broadway also includes Bengal Tiger at the Baghdad Zoo with Robin Williams by Pulitzer Prize finalist Rajiv Joseph. Her score garnered a win in the sound design category for this collaboration.

As a solo artist, Bostic has toured extensively in festivals and venues including the Copenhagen Jazz Festival, Ronnie Scott's, Birdland, Tokyo and Osaka Blue Note, and The Pori Jazz Festival. Also a vocalist, Bostic has recorded and performed with many artists including Nas, Ryuichi Sakamoto, and David Byrne.

== Awards and nominations ==
Year	Organization	Category	Nominated work	Result
2024	Hollywood Music in Media Awards	Original Score – TV/Streamed Movie	The Supremes at Earl's All-You-Can-Eat	Won
2024	Primetime Emmy Awards	Outstanding Music Composition for a Limited or Anthology Series, Movie or Special (Original Dramatic Score)	The Supremes at Earl's All-You-Can-Eat	Nominated
2021	Primetime Emmy Awards	Outstanding Music Composition For A Documentary Series or Special (Original Dramatic Score)	Amy Tan: Unintended Memoir	Nominated
2020	News & Documentary Emmy Awards	Outstanding Music Composition	Toni Morrison: The Pieces I Am	Nominated
2019	Society of Composers & Lyricists Awards	Outstanding Original Score for an Independent Film	Toni Morrison: The Pieces I Am	Won
2019	Society of Composers & Lyricists Awards	Outstanding Original Song for Visual Media - "High Above The Water"	Toni Morrison: The Pieces I Am	Nominated
2019	Hollywood Music in Media Awards	Outstanding Score Documentary	Toni Morrison: The Pieces I Am	Nominated
2015	Black Reel Awards of 2015	Black Reel Outstanding Score Award	Dear White People	Nominated
2013	Black Reel Awards of 2013	Black Reel Best Original Score Award	Middle of Nowhere	Nominated
2012	African-American Film Critics Association Awards 2012	African-American Film Critics Best Music Award	Middle of Nowhere	Won
2011	Drama Desk Award	Drama Desk	Bengal Tiger at the Baghdad Zoo	Nominated
