= Aunjanue Ellis-Taylor =

American actress (born 1969)

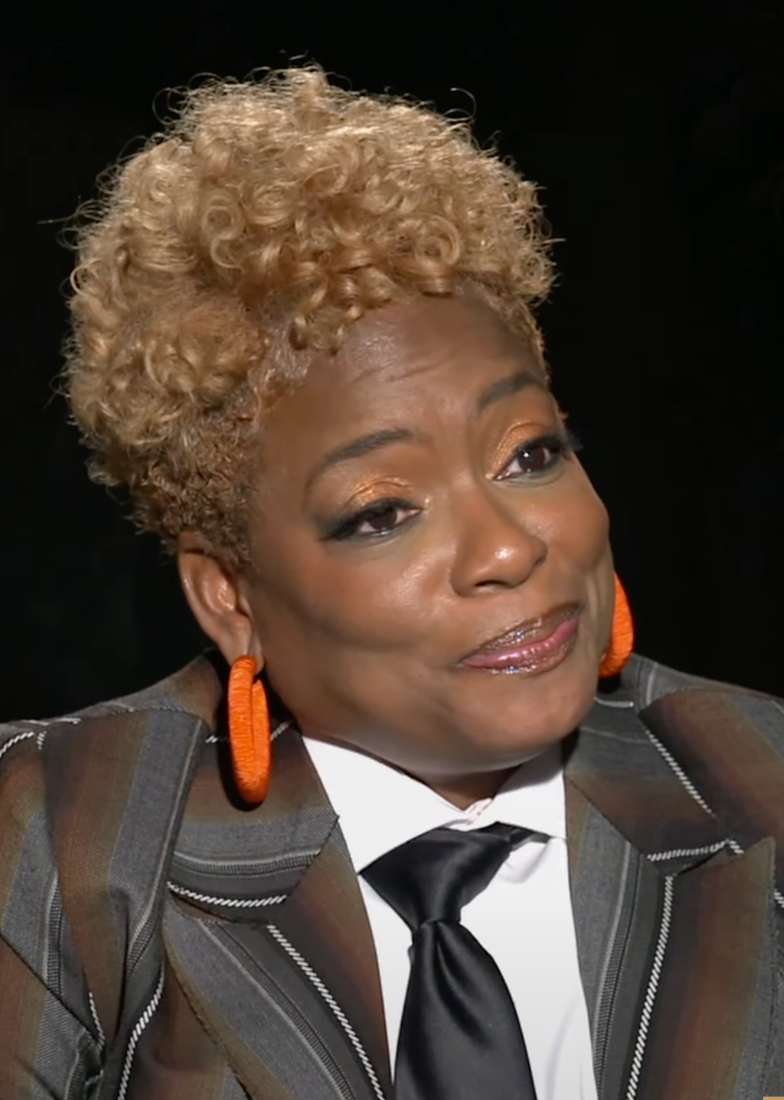
- Ellis-Taylor in 2025
- Born: February 21, 1969 (age 57); San Francisco, California, U.S.
- Other name: Aunjanue Ellis
- Education: Tougaloo College; Brown University (BA); New York University (MFA)
- Occupations: Actress; activist
- Years active: 1995–present
- Awards: Full list

Aunjanue L. Ellis-Taylor (/ˈɑːnʒənuː/; née Ellis; born February 21, 1969) is an American actress. She has received several accolades, including nominations for an Academy Award, a Golden Globe Award, and two Primetime Emmy Awards.

She has appeared in numerous films, including Men of Honor (2000), Undercover Brother (2002), Ray (2004), Freedomland (2006), The Taking of Pelham 123 (2009), The Help (2011), The Birth of a Nation (2016), and If Beale Street Could Talk (2018). For her portrayal of Oracene Price in the sports drama King Richard (2021), she was nominated for the Academy Award for Best Supporting Actress. She has since starred in The Color Purple (2023), Origin (2023), and Nickel Boys (2024).

On television, Ellis had regular and recurring roles in the series High Incident (1996–1997), The Practice (1999), True Blood (2008), and The Mentalist (2010–2013). She also appeared in several television films, such as Gifted Hands: The Ben Carson Story (2009), Abducted: The Carlina White Story (2013), and The Clark Sisters: First Ladies of Gospel (2020), as well as the miniseries The Book of Negroes (2015) and series Quantico (2015–2017). She was nominated for two Primetime Emmy Awards for her roles in the miniseries When They See Us (2019) and the series Lovecraft Country (2021).

== Early life ==
Ellis was born in San Francisco, and raised on her grandmother's farm in Magnolia, Mississippi. She attended Tougaloo College before transferring to Brown University, where she completed her Bachelor of Arts in African-American studies. She also studied acting with Jim Barnhill and John Emigh. During her years at Brown University, Ellis made her debut in a student play. She went on to study acting in the Graduate Acting Program at New York University's Tisch School of the Arts. She is a member of Delta Sigma Theta sorority.

== Career ==
=== 1990s ===
In 1995, Ellis made her professional acting debut appearing as Ariel opposite Patrick Stewart's Prospero in a Broadway revival of William Shakespeare's The Tempest. She later made her screen debut in the episode of Fox police drama series New York Undercover. In 1996, she had the co-leading role in the independent film Girls Town alongside Lili Taylor. During the late 1990s, Ellis also had supporting roles in films such as Ed's Next Move, Desert Blue, In Too Deep, and A Map of the World. From 1996 to 1997, Ellis starred as Officer Leslie Joyner in the ABC police drama series High Incident, created by Steven Spielberg. The series was canceled after two seasons. In 1999, she had the recurring role of Sharon Young on the ABC legal drama, The Practice.

=== 2000s ===
In 2000, Ellis starred opposite Cuba Gooding Jr. in George Tillman Jr.'s drama film Men of Honor. The following year, she played daughter of Samuel L. Jackson's character in the mystery-drama film The Caveman's Valentine, directed by Kasi Lemmons and based on George Dawes Green's 1994 novel of the same name. Also in 2001, Ellis had a supporting part in the critically acclaimed comedy-drama film Lovely & Amazing.

In 2002, she had main role alongside Eddie Griffin in the action comedy film Undercover Brother. In 2004, she played Mary Ann Fisher in the Academy Award-nominated biographical film about musician Ray Charles, Ray. In 2007, Ellis played the leading role in the thriller Cover, which received negative reviews. During this time, she also appeared in films such as Freedomland (2006), The Express (2008) and Notorious (2009). She played Denzel Washington's wife in the 2009 film The Taking of Pelham 123, directed by Tony Scott.

On television, in 2002, Ellis had a regular role on the short-lived ABC medical drama MDs. From 2005 to 2006, she co-starred alongside Benjamin Bratt in another short-lived drama E-Ring on NBC. She also had recurring roles on Third Watch, 100 Centre Street, Jonny Zero, Justice and True Blood. In 2009, she co-starred alongside Cuba Gooding Jr. and Kimberly Elise in the made-for-television film, Gifted Hands: The Ben Carson Story.

Ellis has also appeared in a number of Broadway and Off-Broadway theatre productions. In January 2004, she performed in Regina Taylor's play Drowning Crow, at the Manhattan Theatre Club. In the Spring, 2012 Hampton University semester, she taught entertainment industry courses. She was also featured in a Hampton Players and Company production, "Through the Crack."

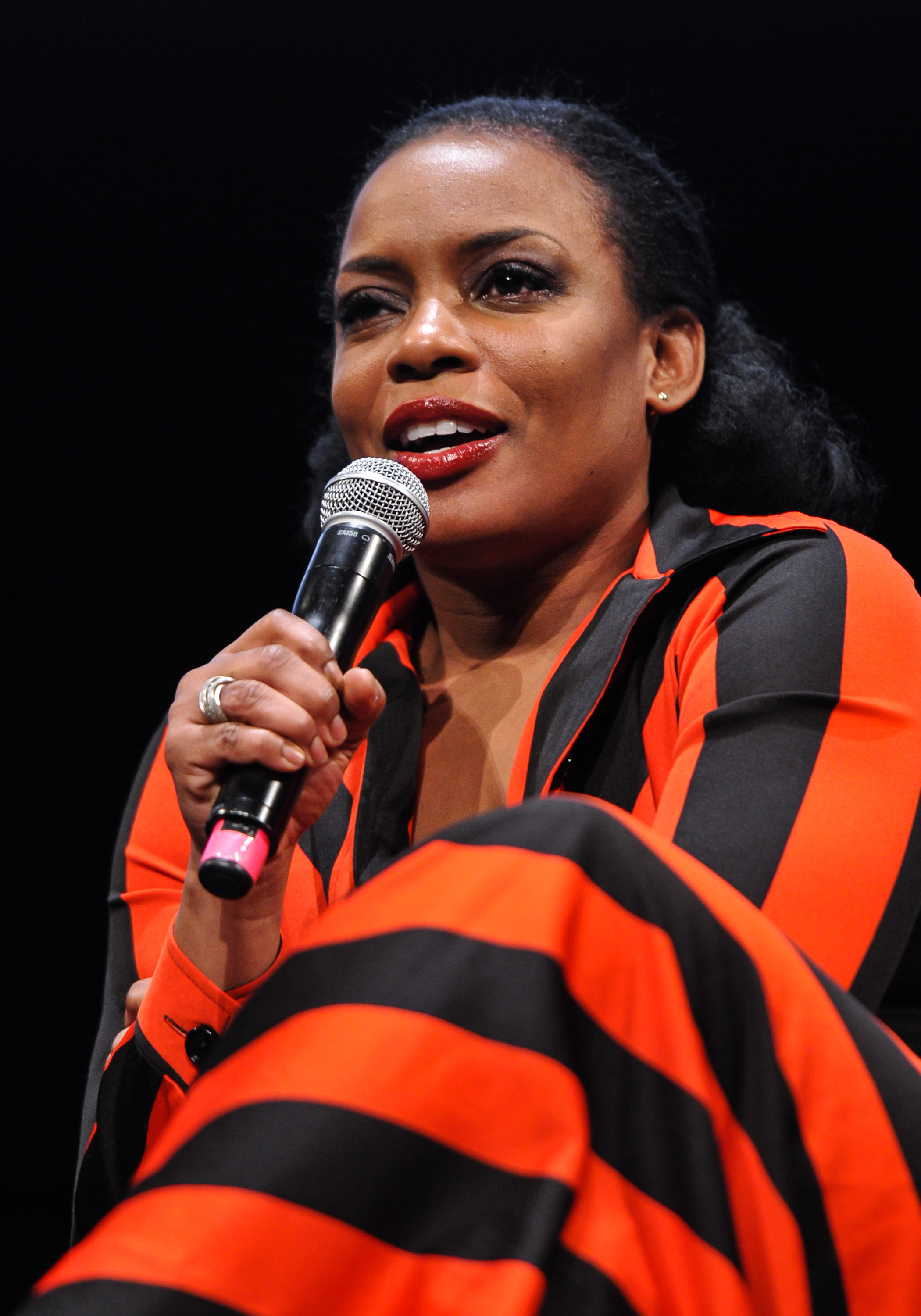
Ellis at event of The Book of Negroes in TIFF Bell Lightbox in 2015

=== 2010s ===
In 2010, Ellis co-starred opposite Wesley Snipes in the action film Game of Death. She also played the leading role in the independent film The Tested based on the award-winning 2005 short film of the same name. In 2011, she appeared in the critically acclaimed period drama The Help, directed by Tate Taylor, as Eula Mae Davis, one of the maids, for which she received number of awards as a part of the ensemble cast, including National Board of Review Award for Best Cast. In 2014, she played Vicki Anderson in the biographical drama film Get On Up about the life of singer James Brown, which was also directed by Tate Taylor. As lead actress, Ellis starred in the independent films Money Matters (2011), The Volunteer (2013), Romeo and Juliet in Harlem (2014), and Una Vida: A Fable of Music and the Mind (2014). She also played the leading role in the 2012 television film Abducted: The Carlina White Story.

From 2010 to 2013, Ellis had a recurring role in the CBS series The Mentalist, as Madeleine Hightower. She also played Ashley Judd's best friend in the 2012 ABC miniseries Missing, and had another role on the CBS procedural, NCIS: Los Angeles. Ellis also starred as one of the lead characters in the 2013 AMC pilot The Divide. When WE tv picked up the show, Ellis left and was recast with Nia Long.

In 2014, Ellis was cast as the lead in the international co-production epic miniseries The Book of Negroes, based on Lawrence Hill’s bestselling 2007 novel. The Book of Negroes premiered in 2015, and Ellis received critical acclaim for her performance. The Hollywood Reporter critic Whitney Matheson praised her performance. "Except for the first installment that focuses on Aminata’s girlhood, Ellis is present in nearly every scene, aging decades and displaying a stunning range of emotion." Ellis received a Critics' Choice Television Award for Best Actress in a Movie or Miniseries nomination for her performance. At the 2016 Canadian Screen Awards, Ellis received Award for Best Lead actress, Television Film or Miniseries.

On February 25, 2015, it was announced that Ellis was cast in the ABC thriller series Quantico. She left the series after two seasons in 2017. In 2016, Ellis co-starred in the historical drama film The Birth of a Nation, based on the story of the 1831 slave rebellion led by Nat Turner. The film also stars Nate Parker, Aja Naomi King, Armie Hammer and Gabrielle Union. Ellis plays the role of Nancy Turner, Nat's mother, in the film. Also in 2016, she was cast opposite Keke Palmer in the drama film Pimp about life for women on the streets of New York and work in the illegal sex trade. In 2018, she appeared in If Beale Street Could Talk, a drama film written and directed by Barry Jenkins.

In February 2018, Ellis was cast in a leading role on the CBS drama pilot Chiefs, which was not picked up to series. Later, she was cast in the independent drama film Miss Virginia opposite Uzo Aduba and Vanessa Williams. In 2019, she starred in the Ava DuVernay-directed miniseries When They See Us for Netflix. She received a Primetime Emmy Award for Outstanding Lead Actress in a Limited Series or Movie nomination for her performance.

=== 2020s ===
In 2020, Ellis portrayed Mattie Moss Clark, the mother of The Clark Sisters, in the Lifetime television film The Clark Sisters: First Ladies of Gospel. The film premiered on April 11, 2020, with positive reviews from critics and was the highest-rated original movie for Lifetime since 2016. Ellis was specifically praised by critics, fans, and the Clark Sisters for her performance. She received NAACP Image Award for Outstanding Actress in a Television Movie, Mini-Series or Dramatic Special nomination for her performance. Also in 2020, Ellis co-starred in the HBO drama series, Lovecraft Country based on the novel of the same name by Matt Ruff. For her performance, she received Primetime Emmy Awards nomination for Outstanding Supporting Actress in a Drama Series.

In 2021, Ellis starred as Oracene Price opposite Will Smith in King Richard, a biopic about Richard Williams. Her performance in the film received critical acclaim, earning the actress her first Academy Award for Best Supporting Actress, British Academy Film Awards and Golden Globe Award for Best Supporting Actress – Motion Picture nominations. Ellis also received nominations at the Critics' Choice Movie Awards, Satellite Awards and Black Reel Awards, winning the National Board of Review Award for Best Supporting Actress. She also received Santa Barbara International Film Festival Outstanding Performer of the Year Award, and the Honorary Award at the 5th Hollywood Critics Association Film Awards.

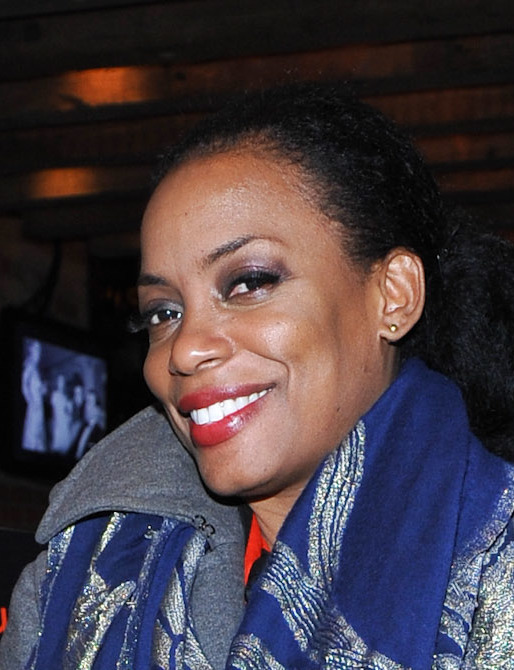
Ellis at an event Celebrating Black History Month in 2015

In 2022, Ellis starred opposite Courtney B. Vance in the AMC courtroom drama series, 61st Street. The series was ordered for a two-season run, but AMC decided against airing it. In May 2023, The CW acquired the series. Ellis then starred as attorney Carolyn Wilder in the FX neo-Western crime drama series, Justified: City Primeval, the limited series inspired by Elmore Leonard’s City Primeval: High Noon in Detroit. She received critical acclaim for her performance, noted by some critics as her best role yet in career.

Also in 2023, Ellis was cast in a leading role in the Ava DuVernay drama film Origin, an adaptation of Isabel Wilkerson’s Caste: The Origins of Our Discontents. Ellis played Isabel Wilkerson in this film, making it her first lead role in a major film of her career. The film premiered at the 80th Venice International Film Festival. Ellis co-starred as Mama in the musical drama film, The Color Purple. The film was released in the United States on December 25, 2023, by Warner Bros. Pictures. In 2024, Ellis starred alongside Uzo Aduba and Sanaa Lathan in The Supremes at Earl's All-You-Can-Eat, an adaptation of Edward Kelsey Moore's 2013 novel of the same name. Directed by Tina Mabry for Searchlight Pictures, the film premiered at the Martha's Vineyard African American Film Festival on August 7, 2024. It was released in theaters in the United States on August 16, and on Hulu on August 23. Ellis then starred alongside Andra Day, Glenn Close and Mo'Nique in Netflix's exorcism horror-thriller film The Deliverance, directed by Lee Daniels. The film was released in select theaters on August 16, 2024, and began streaming on Netflix on August 30. Ellis starred opposite André Holland and Andra Day in the Sundance-premiered drama film Exhibiting Forgiveness, directed by Titus Kaphar and released on October 18, 2024. She co-starred with Hamish Linklater and Fred Hechinger in the period drama film Nickel Boys, an adaptation of the 2019 novel by American novelist Colson Whitehead, released in December 2024.

== Personal life ==
In her 2022 interview with Variety magazine, Ellis came out as bisexual. In 2023, she started going by the double-barrelled name, Ellis-Taylor, in honor of her mother.

== Acting credits ==
Key
†	Denotes works that have not yet been released

=== Film ===
Year	Title	Role	Notes
1996	Girls Town	Nikki	
1996	Ed's Next Move	Erica	
1998	Side Streets	Brenda Boyce	
1998	Desert Blue	Agent Summers	
1999	In Too Deep	Denise	
1999	A Map of the World	Dyshett	
2000	John John in the Sky	Earlene	
2000	Men of Honor	Jo Brashear	
2000	The Opponent	June	
2001	The Caveman's Valentine	Lulu	
2001	Lovely & Amazing	Lorraine	
2002	I Am Ali	Herself	Short
2002	Undercover Brother	Sistah Girl	
2004	Brother to Brother	Zora Neale Hurston	
2004	Ray	Mary Ann Fisher	
2005	Perception	Vera	
2006	Freedomland	Felicia	
2007	Cover	Valerie Mass	
2008	The Express	Marie Davis	
2009	Notorious	Sandy	
2009	I Love You Phillip Morris	Reba	
2009	Motherhood	Sample Sale Friend	
2009	The Hungry Ghosts	Nadia	
2009	The Taking of Pelham 123	Therese	
2010	The Tested	Darraylynn Warren	
2010	Game of Death	Rachel	
2011	The Resident	Sydney	
2011	The Help	Yule May Davis	
2011	Money Matters	Pamela Matters	
2013	The Volunteer	Leigh	
2014	Get On Up	Vicki Anderson	
2014	Of Mind and Music	Una Vida	
2016	The Birth of a Nation	Nancy Turner	
2017	Romeo and Juliet in Harlem	Lady Capulet	
2018	If Beale Street Could Talk	Mrs. Hunt	
2018	Pimp	Gloria Ray	
2019	Miss Virginia	Lorraine Townsend	
2020	The Subject	Leslie Barnes	
2021	King Richard	Oracene "Brandy" Price	
2022	Fannie	Fannie Lou Hamer	Short
2023	Origin	Isabel Wilkerson	
2023	The Color Purple	Mama	
2024	Exhibiting Forgiveness	Joyce	
2024	The Supremes at Earl's All-You-Can-Eat	Odette Jackson	
2024	The Deliverance	Reverend Bernice James	
2024	Nickel Boys	Hattie	
2026	Lucky Strike	Mrs. Caldwell	
2026	Give Me Some Sugah †	Angie	Post-production
2027	Get Lite †	TBA	Filming
TBA	The Body Is Water †	Ree	Post-production
TBA	Liz Here Now †	Liz Baxter	Post-production

=== Television ===
Year	Title	Role	Notes
1995	New York Undercover	Claudia	Episode: "Buster and Claudia"
1996–1997	High Incident	Off. Leslie Joyner	Main cast
1999	The Practice	Sharon Young	Recurring cast (season 3), guest (season 4)
2000	Third Watch	Gail Moore	Recurring cast (season 1)
2000	Disappearing Acts	Pam	Television film
2001	Access Granted	Herself	Episode: "Snoop Dogg: Undercover Funk"
2001	100 Centre Street	Amanda Davis	Recurring cast (season 1)
2002	MDs	Quinn Joyner	Main cast
2004	The D.A.	Ellen Baker	Episode: "The People vs. Sergius Kovinsky"
2005	Jonny Zero	Gloria	Recurring cast
2005–2006	E-Ring	Jocelyn Pierce	Main cast
2006–2007	Justice	Miranda Lee	Main cast
2007	Law & Order: Criminal Intent	Carmen Rivera	Episode: "Flipped"
2008	Racing for Time	Officer Baker	Television film
2008	The Prince of Motor City	Cora Neel	Television film
2008	Numb3rs	Ivy Kirk	Episode: "Power"
2008	The Border	Amira	Episode: "Family Values"
2008	True Blood	Diane	Recurring cast (season 1)
2009	The Good Wife	Linda Underwood	Episode: "Crash"
2009	Gifted Hands: The Ben Carson Story	Candy Carson	Television film
2010–2013	The Mentalist	Madeleine Hightower	Recurring cast (seasons 2–3), guest (season 6)
2011	Say Yes to the Dress: Atlanta	Herself	Episode: "Be Bold"
2012	Blue Bloods	Sylvia Marshall	Episode: "Reagan V. Reagan"
2012	Missing	Mary Dresden	Recurring cast
2012	Abducted: The Carlina White Story	Ann Pettway	Television film
2012–2017	NCIS: Los Angeles	Michelle Hanna	Recurring cast (season 4), guest (seasons 5–6 & 8)
2014	Sleepy Hollow	Lori Mills	Episode: "Mama"
2015	The Book of Negroes	Aminata Diallo	Main cast
2015–2017	Quantico	Miranda Shaw	Main cast (seasons 1–2)
2018–2019	Designated Survivor	Vice President Ellenor Darby	Recurring cast (season 2), guest (season 3)
2019	When They See Us	Sharonne Salaam	Main cast
2020	Law & Order: Special Victims Unit	Laura Chase	Episode: "Garland's Baptism by Fire"
2020	Release	Ida	Episode: "Scorn"
2020	Lovecraft Country	Hippolyta Freeman	Main cast
2020	The Clark Sisters: First Ladies of Gospel	Mattie Moss Clark	Television film
2022–2023	61st Street	Martha Roberts	Main cast
2023	Justified: City Primeval	Carolyn Wilder	Main cast
2026	Lucky	Agent Billie Rand	Main cast
TBA	Einstein †	Captain Frost	Main cast

=== Theater ===
Year	Title	Role	Playwright	Venue	Ref.
1995	The Tempest	Ariel	William Shakespeare	Broadhurst Theatre, Broadway	
1997	Seeking the Genesis	C. Ana	Kia Corthron	New York City Center, Off-Broadway	
2000	The Winter's Tale	Hermione	William Shakespeare	Delacorte Theater, Off-Broadway	
2004	Drowning Crow	Hannah Jordan	Anton Chekhov (new adaptation by Regina Taylor)	Samuel J. Friedman Theatre, Broadway	
2009	Joe Turner's Come and Gone	Molly Cunningham	August Wilson	Belasco Theatre, Broadway	

== See also ==
- List of actors with Academy Award nominations
- List of LGBTQ Academy Awards winners and nominees — Confirmed individuals for Best Supporting Actress
