= The Supremes at Earl's All-You-Can-Eat =

2024 film directed by Tina Mabry

- Release poster
- Directed by: Tina Mabry
- Screenplay by: Cee Marcellus; Tina Mabry
- Based on: The Supremes at Earl's All-You-Can-Eat by Edward Kelsey Moore
- Produced by: Marty Bowen; Wyck Godfrey; Isaac Klausner
- Starring: Aunjanue Ellis-Taylor; Sanaa Lathan; Uzo Aduba; Mekhi Phifer; Julian McMahon; Vondie Curtis-Hall; Donna Biscoe; Russell Hornsby
- Cinematography: Sean McElwee
- Edited by: Tariq Anwar
- Music by: Kathryn Bostic
- Production companies: Searchlight Pictures; Temple Hill Entertainment
- Distributed by: Hulu
- Release dates: August 7, 2024 (MVAAFF); August 23, 2024 (United States)
- Running time: 124 minutes
- Country: United States
- Language: English
- Budget: $23 million

The Supremes at Earl's All-You-Can-Eat is a 2024 American drama film directed by Tina Mabry and written by Mabry and Cee Marcellus. It is based on the 2013 novel of the same name by Edward Kelsey Moore. The film stars Aunjanue Ellis-Taylor, Sanaa Lathan, Uzo Aduba, Mekhi Phifer, Julian McMahon, Vondie Curtis-Hall, and Russell Hornsby. This was McMahon’s final film role before his death in 2025.

The Supremes at Earl's All-You-Can-Eat premiered at the Martha's Vineyard African American Film Festival on August 7, 2024, and was released by Hulu on August 23, 2024.

== Plot ==
The film spans decades—jumping between the late 1960s and 1999—in Plainview, Indiana. It centers on a trio of lifelong best friends: Odette, the brave, fiercely outspoken anchor of the group; Clarice, a wildly talented pianist who frequently sacrifices her own ambitions to keep the peace and save face; and Barbara Jean, a gentle soul haunted by tragedy and past trauma. The three are nicknamed "The Supremes" for their flair, beauty, and unbreakable bond.

The movie opens with the folklore behind Odette's arrival. Legend has it that her mother, tired of a late pregnancy, climbed a sycamore tree after consulting a local practitioner and gave birth to Odette in its branches—a legendary start for a girl born to fear nothing.

In 1968 Plainview, Indiana, teenage Odette and her refined, musically gifted friend Clarice run into Barbara Jean, a quiet girl living with an abusive, alcohol-dependent stepfather following her mother's death. Recognizing her desperate situation, Odette and Clarice take Barbara Jean under their wing and bring her to Earl’s All-You-Can-Eat, the local Black-owned diner run by Big Earl and his wife, Mama Millie.

Big Earl gives Barbara Jean a job, a safe place to stay, and a second family. Because the three girls are always dressed up and sitting in the same booth together, Earl fondly nicknames them "The Supremes." Around this time, Clarice falls for high school football star, Richmond; Odette catches the eye of his sweet best friend, James (who remembers her beating up his bullies when they were 12 and had loved her ever since); and lastly Barbara Jean falls deeply in love with Ray ("Chick"), a white young man working at the diner. However, intense racial prejudice in their town (and from his abusive older brother, Desmond) tore them apart, forcing Ray to leave town.

Thirty years later, the Supremes are in their late 40s/early 50s, still meeting at Earl's, but each facing a major life crisis. Odette and James are deeply in love and have a solid marriage. However, Odette receives devastating news: she has non-Hodgkin’s lymphoma. Known as the "strong one" who fixes everyone else's problems, she chooses to keep her cancer diagnosis a secret from Clarice and Barbara Jean so as not to overwhelm them while they are going through their own struggles. Odette also experiences visions of her deceased mother and Big Earl, who offer her guidance and comfort as she contemplates her mortality. Clarice gave up her dream of attending Juilliard for classical piano to marry Richmond and raise a family. She has spent decades maintaining a picture-perfect facade, turning a blind eye to Richmond's serial infidelities. When Richmond's latest affair becomes painfully public, Clarice is forced to confront the fact that she sacrificed her identity and talent for a man who doesn't respect her. Barbara Jean married an older, wealthy man named Lester, but her life has been defined by grief—most painfully, the death of her young son years ago. Following Lester's death, Barbara Jean spirals into severe alcoholism to numb the pain of her past trauma and her long-lost love with Ray.

As the women's lives unravel, several key events push their bond to the limit. Ray returns to Plainview after decades away. He and Barbara Jean reconnect, reigniting their feelings. He helps her face her lingering grief and trauma, encouraging her to take control of her life and seek sobriety. After discovering another betrayal by Richmond, Clarice finally snaps. Instead of keeping quiet to save face, she publicly confronts him, kicks him out, and decides to rediscover her passion for playing the piano. Odette collapses due to her illness and treatment side effects, forcing the truth about her cancer into the open. Clarice and Barbara Jean are devastated that Odette tried to protect them alone, but they immediately rally around her. The dynamic shifts: the two women who relied on Odette for decades now become her emotional and physical anchor.

While undergoing chemotherapy, Odette is surrounded by the love of James, Clarice, and Barbara Jean. Seeing her friends reclaim their lives gives Odette the strength to keep fighting. Barbara Jean enters recovery, heals from the tragedy of her son's death, and moves forward with Ray, finally getting the second chance at love they were denied in their youth; Clarice divorces Richmond and steps back to the piano, choosing her own happiness and self-worth over social perfection and Odette goes into remission.

The film ends with the Supremes back at Earl's diner—older, weathered by life's hardships, but stronger than ever. They sit in their favorite booth, celebrating their enduring sisterhood and the unconditional love that saw them through life's hardest moments.

== Cast ==
- Aunjanue Ellis-Taylor as Odette
  - Kyanna Simone as Young Odette
    - Zayana Willow Dukes as Baby Odette
- Sanaa Lathan as Barbara Jean
  - Tati Gabrielle as Young Barbara Jean
- Uzo Aduba as Clarice
  - Abigail Achiri as Young Clarice
- Mekhi Phifer as James Henry
  - Dijon Means as Young James
- Julian McMahon as Ray "Chick" Carlson
  - Ryan Paynter as Young Ray
- Vondie Curtis-Hall as Lester
  - Cleveland Berto as Young Lester
- Russell Hornsby as Richmond
  - Xavier Mills as Young Richmond
- Donna Biscoe as Minnie
- Tony Winters as Big Earl
- Jason Turner as Lil' Earl
- JB Chen as Dr. Li
- Deja Dee as Veronica
  - Renee Harrison as young Veronica
- Donna Biscoe as Minnie
- Jesse Gallegos as Desmond
- Kadianne Whyte as Cherokee

== Production ==
In December 2020, an adaptation of Edward Kelsey Moore's novel The Supremes at Earl's All-You-Can-Eat was in development, which was to be directed by Tina Mabry, who also co-wrote the screenplay with Gina Prince-Bythewood. Cee Marcellus would eventually be credited on the film's screenplay with Mabry. It was a co-production of Searchlight Pictures and Temple Hill Entertainment. It was announced in July 2022 that Uzo Aduba, Aunjanue Ellis-Taylor and Sanaa Lathan were cast to star in the film. In September, Russell Hornsby was added to the cast, with Mekhi Phifer joining the follow month. In October 2022, Kyanna Simone, Tati Gabrielle and Abigail Achiri joined the cast.

Filming began on October 12, 2022, in Wilmington, North Carolina. Production ran until mid-November. It wrapped up by November 11, 2022, with Dijon Means, Xavier Mills, Cleveland Berto, Jason Turner and Ryan Paynter having joined the cast.

== Release ==
The Supremes at Earl's All-You-Can-Eat premiered on August 7, 2024 at the Martha's Vineyard African American Film Festival. The film was released on Hulu in the United States on August 23, 2024. Internationally, it was released on Disney+.

== Reception ==
=== Viewership ===
Luminate, which measures streaming performance in the U.S. by analyzing viewership data, audience engagement metrics, and content reach across various platforms, calculated that The Supremes at Earl's All-You-Can-Eat was the fifth most-streamed original movie during the week of August 12–23, with 139.2 million minutes of watch time. JustWatch, a guide to streaming content with access to data from more than 40 million users around the world, estimated that it was the fifth most-streamed film in the U.S. from August 26 to September 1. The Supremes at Earl's All-You-Can-Eat ranked No. 13 on Hulu's "Top 15 Today" list—a daily updated list of the platform's most-watched titles—on September 5, 2024.

=== Critical response ===
On the review aggregator website Rotten Tomatoes, 65% of 26 critics' reviews are positive, with an average rating of 5.8/10. Metacritic, which uses a weighted average, assigned the film a score of 55 out of 100, based on 9 critics, indicating "mixed or average" reviews. Lovia Gyarkye of The Hollywood Reporter said Mabry’s adaptation of Moore’s book effectively portrays deep friendships among older Black women, focusing on their reflections following the death of a patriarchal figure. Gyarkye found the film notable for its tender handling of the characters' personal and romantic struggles, with strong performances from the cast adding depth to its sentimental narrative. Amy Nicholson of The New York Times said The Supremes at Earl’s All-You-Can-Eat offers a melodramatic array of themes, including adultery, alcoholism, and murder, presented with a mix of humor and pathos. Nicholson stated that the film is engaging due to its vibrant portrayal of three friends, strong performances by the cast, and the film's indulgent, if occasionally over-the-top, narrative style.

Robert Daniels of RogerEbert.com said that the film grabs attention towards its eye-catching plot details and performances, but pushes audiences away due to its ludicrous plot points. Lisa Kennedy of Variety added that the film had moments of minor magic owing to the friendship dynamic. Kate Erbland of IndieWire added that the adult cast members anchor the film through their performances. Radheyan Simonpillai of The Guardian criticised that the erratic storytelling, like a bunch of detailed sketches and monologues, making the film never intended to be how it shaped. She, however, complimented the performances despite the narrative flaws. B. Panther of Paste added that despite the exceptional talent and promising story about friendship through adversity, The Supremes at Earl’s All-You-Can-Eat seems destined to be lost to the platform's over-extended menu of lukewarm film library and overlooked in favor of more nourishing and enjoyable food.

=== Accolades ===
Award	Date of ceremony	Category	Recipient(s) and nominee(s)	Result	Ref.
African-American Film Critics Association	August 25, 2025	Best Television Movie	The Supremes at Earl's All-You-Can-Eat	Won	
Astra TV Awards	June 9, 2025	Best Television Movie	The Supremes at Earl's All-You-Can-Eat	Nominated	
Black Reel Awards	August 18, 2025	Outstanding Television Movie or Limited Series	The Supremes at Earl's All-You-Can-Eat – Marty Bowen, Wyck Godfrey and Isaac Klausner	Nominated	
Black Reel Awards	August 18, 2025	Outstanding Lead Performance in a TV Movie/Limited Series	Aunjanue Ellis-Taylor	Nominated	
Black Reel Awards	August 18, 2025	Outstanding Lead Performance in a TV Movie/Limited Series	Uzo Aduba	Nominated	
Black Reel Awards	August 18, 2025	Outstanding Writing in a TV Movie or Limited Series	Cee Marcellus and Tina Mabry	Nominated	
Black Reel Awards	August 18, 2025	Outstanding Musical Score	Kathryn Bostic	Nominated	
Black Reel Awards	August 18, 2025	Outstanding Costume Design	Whitney Anne Adams	Nominated	
Black Reel Awards	August 18, 2025	Outstanding Makeup & Hairstyling	Andrea Jackson and Dianne Wynn	Nominated	
Gotham TV Awards	June 2, 2025	Outstanding Performance in an Original Film	Aunjanue Ellis-Taylor	Nominated	
Guild of Music Supervisors Awards	February 23, 2025	Best Music Supervision for a Non-Theatrically Released Film	Robin Urdang	Nominated	
Hollywood Music In Media Awards	November 20, 2024	Original Score – TV/Streamed Movie	Kathryn Bostic	Won	
NAACP Image Awards	February 22, 2025	Outstanding Actress in a Television Movie, Mini-Series or Special	Aunjanue Ellis-Taylor	Nominated	
NAACP Image Awards	February 22, 2025	Outstanding Actress in a Television Movie, Mini-Series or Special	Sanaa Lathan	Nominated	
NAACP Image Awards	February 22, 2025	Outstanding Actress in a Television Movie, Mini-Series or Special	Uzo Aduba	Nominated	
NAACP Image Awards	February 22, 2025	Outstanding Directing in a Television Movie, Documentary or Special	Tina Mabry	Won	
NAACP Image Awards	February 22, 2025	Outstanding Writing in a Television Movie, Documentary or Special	Cee Marcellus, Gina Prince-Bythewood and Tina Mabry	Nominated	
Primetime Creative Arts Emmy Awards	September 6–7, 2025	Outstanding Music Composition for a Limited or Anthology Series, Movie or Special (Original Dramatic Score)	Kathryn Bostic	Nominated	
