= Terry McMillan Presents =

American television romantic drama film series

- Genre: Romantic drama
- Created by: Terry McMillan
- Country of origin: United States
- Original language: English

Production
- Executive producers: Terry McMillan; D'Angela Proctor; Chet Fenster

Original release
- Network: Lifetime
- Release: August 17, 2024 – present

Terry McMillan Presents is an American television romantic and drama television film series produced by novelist Terry McMillan for Lifetime. The series features the love and lives of African American women.

The first movie titled Tempted by Love premiered on August 17, 2024 and starred Garcelle Beauvais, Vaughn W. Hebron, Lela Rochon, Donna Biscoe and Loretta Devine and features age difference love story. The second film titled Forever starred Taye Diggs and Meagan Good premiered on August 24, 2024. On November 1, 2025 His, Hers & Ours starring Taye Diggs, Lesley-Ann Brandt and Aimee Garcia was released. The next film of franchise, Preach, Pray, Love features a romance between a pastor and a platinum-selling rapper starring Karrueche Tran, Mark J.P. Hood, Tobias Truvillion, B. Simone, Da Brat and Dawn Halfkenny premiered on November 8, 2025. On January 31, 2026 was releases a sequel for Tempted by Love titled Tempted 2 Love featuring original cast Beauvais, Hebron, Rochon and Boris Kodjoe who has been added as a male lead. The next film of the franchise titled Paradise with You stars Taye Diggs, Heather Hemmens and Cynthia Bailey set for fall 2026 debut.

== Films ==
No.	Title	Directed by	Written by	Original release date
1	"Terry McMillan Presents: Tempted by Love"	Tailiah Breon	Tamara Gregory	17 August 2024
2	"Terry McMillan Presents: Forever"	Charles Murray	Bart Baker	24 August 2024
3	"Terry McMillan Presents: His, Hers & Ours"	Patricia Cuffie-Jones	Bart Baker	1 November 2025
4	"Terry McMillan Presents: Preach, Pray, Love"	Damon Lee	Michael Elliot and Cory Tynan	8 November 2025
5	"Terry McMillan Presents: Tempted 2 Love"	Roger M. Bobb	Tamara Gregory	31 January 2026
6	"Terry McMillan Presents: Paradise with You"	Patricia Frontain	Ejay Jamison	TBA

== Awards and nominations ==
Year	Awards	Category	Movie/Serie	Outcome
2024	Women's Image Network Awards	Actress Made For Television Movie / Limited Series	Garcelle Beauvais for Tempted by Love	Nominated
2025	NAMIC Vision Awards	Original Movie or Special	Tempted by Love	Won
2025	NAACP Image Awards	Outstanding Supporting Actress in a Television Movie, Limited-Series or Special	Loretta Devine for Tempted by Love	Nominated
2025	Writers Guild of America Awards	TV & Streaming Motion Pictures	Bart Baker for Forever	Nominated
2026	NAACP Image Awards	Outstanding Actor in a Limited Television (Series, Special, or Movie)	Taye Diggs for His, Hers & Ours	Nominated

== See also ==
- The Wrong another Lifetime film franchise
