= Antisocial (film) =

- Directed by: Cody Calahan
- Written by: Chad Archibald; Cody Calahan
- Starring: Michelle Mylett; Cody Ray Thompson; Adam Christie
- Cinematography: Jeff Maher
- Edited by: Chad Archibald; Cody Calahan
- Music by: Steph Copeland
- Production company: Black Fawn Films; Breakthrough Entertainment
- Release date: July 31, 2013 (Fantasia Film Festival)
- Running time: 90 minutes
- Country: Canada
- Language: English

Antisocial is a 2013 Canadian horror film and the feature film directorial debut of Cody Calahan. The film had its world premiere on 31 July 2013 at the Fantasia Film Festival and a sequel entitled Antisocial 2 was released in 2015. Both films predominantly center on Sam, a young woman that finds herself in the middle of a pandemic where infected people suddenly begin showing strange symptoms and violent behavior.

== Synopsis ==
Sam is a young college student that has recently been dumped by her boyfriend via video chat. To lift her spirits Sam decides to take her friend Mark up on his offer to attend a small New Year's Eve pre-party. Once there, things seem to be going well until their friend Jed turns on the television, which displays a news story about a seemingly isolated act of violence. The attack proves to be not so isolated as the group soon finds themselves the focus of an attack. Through the news and social media sites the group discovers that there is a new disease that causes various different symptoms, one of which is uncontrolled violence. They board themselves up in their lodgings and initially they believe that they will be fine until some of their friends begin to show symptoms of the disease. The film also follows Brian, a friend of Jed's that is confined to his dorm room and decides that he will chronicle the happenings online via a social media site named Social Redroom.

== Cast ==
- Michelle Mylett as Sam Reznor
- Cody Ray Thompson as Mark Archibald
- Adam Christie as Jed Erickson
- Ana Alic as Kaitlin Cosgrove
- Romaine Waite as Steve McDonald
- Ry Barrett as Chad Wilson
- Eitan Shalmon as Brian
- Laurel Brandes as Tara Reiner
- Kate Vokral as Julia
- Charlie Hamilton as Dan Hamilton
- Colin Murphy as The Doctor

== Reception ==
Critical reception to Antisocial has been predominantly negative and the film holds a rating of 25% at Rotten Tomatoes, based on 8 reviews.

Shock Till You Drop and Grolsch Film Works both panned the film, the latter writing that "This really is an idea for Generation 2.0 – but the social commentary is short-circuited by Antisocial's faulty wiring."

Reviewers at ScreenDaily and Dread Central enjoyed it, on the other hand; one called it an "impressively sustained number that belies its modest budget" and the other praised it as "a solid Canadian horror film made for the Generation Y crowd" that "is surely able to crawl under the viewers' skin as it deals with a frightening concept far too relevant in our self-induced, isolated digital world."
