= Steel Magnolias (2012 film) =

- Online poster
- Based on: Steel Magnolias by Robert Harling
- Screenplay by: Sally Robinson
- Directed by: Kenny Leon
- Starring: Queen Latifah; Phylicia Rashad; Adepero Oduye; Condola Rashad; Jill Scott; Tory Kittles; Afemo Omilami; Alfre Woodard
- Music by: William Ross
- Country of origin: United States
- Original language: English

Production
- Producers: Neil Meron; Queen Latifah; Shakim Compere; Shelby Stone; Craig Zadan
- Running time: 85 minutes
- Production company: Sony Pictures Television

Original release
- Network: Lifetime
- Release: October 7, 2012

Steel Magnolias is an American comedy-drama television film directed by Kenny Leon that premiered at Lifetime Network on October 7, 2012. It is a contemporary retelling of the play Steel Magnolias and its 1989 film adaptation. The new film stars an all-black American cast, including Queen Latifah as M'Lynn, Jill Scott as Truvy, Condola Rashad as Shelby, Adepero Oduye as Annelle, with Phylicia Rashad as Clairee and Alfre Woodard as Ouiser. The film marks the first collaboration between Latifah and Scott (the second being Flint in 2017).

== Cast ==
- Queen Latifah as Mary Lynn "M'Lynn" Eatenton
- Phylicia Rashad as Clairee Belcher
- Adepero Oduye as Annelle Dupuy-DeSoto
- Condola Rashad as Shelby Eatenton-Latcherie, M'Lynn & Drum's daughter and Jackson's mother
- Jill Scott as Truvy Jones
- Alfre Woodard as Louisa "Ouiser" Boudreaux, Clairee's best friend
- Tory Kittles as Jackson Latcherie, Shelby's husband and Jackson's father
- Afemo Omilami as Drum Eatenton, M'Lynn's husband
- Lance Gross as Sammy DeSoto, Annelle's husband
- Michael Beasley as Spud Jones, Truvy's husband
- Demetrius Bridges as Jonathan Eatenton, M'Lynn & Drum's first son
- Justin Martin as Tommy Eatenton, M'Lynn & Drum's second son
- Julius Erving as Minister
- Jeff Rose as Dr. Judd

== Reception ==
=== Critical reception ===
The film has been met with positive reviews from critics, with a score of 74 out of 100 from Metacritic. Many critics praised Alfre Woodard's performance as Ouiser.

=== Ratings ===
The film premiered on Sunday, October 7, 2012, on Lifetime and earned 6.5 million viewers. It is the 3rd highest viewed Lifetime Original.

=== Accolades ===
Award	Date of ceremony	Category	Recipient(s)	Result	Ref.
Black Reel Awards	February 7, 2013	Best Television Miniseries or Movie	Steel Magnolias	Nominated	
Black Reel Awards	February 7, 2013	Best Actress in a TV Movie or Limited Series	Queen Latifah	Nominated	
Black Reel Awards	February 7, 2013	Best Supporting Actress in a TV Movie or Limited Series	Alfre Woodard	Won	
Black Reel Awards	February 7, 2013	Best Supporting Actress in a TV Movie or Limited Series	Jill Scott	Nominated	
Black Reel Awards	February 7, 2013	Best Supporting Actress in a TV Movie or Limited Series	Phylicia Rashad	Nominated	
Black Reel Awards	February 7, 2013	Best Supporting Actress in a TV Movie or Limited Series	Adepero Oduye	Nominated	
Black Reel Awards	February 7, 2013	Outstanding Director in a Television Miniseries or Movie	Kenny Leon	Nominated	
Critics' Choice Television Awards	June 10, 2013	Best Supporting Actress in a Movie/Miniseries	Alfre Woodard	Nominated	
Gracie Awards	May 21, 2013	Outstanding Performance by a Cast in a Drama	Cast of Steel Magnolias	Won	
Motion Picture Sound Editors Awards	February 17, 2013	Outstanding Achievement in Sound Editing	Robert Getty, Pembrooke Andrews, Chato Hill, Pembrooke Andrews	Nominated	
NAACP Image Awards	February 1, 2013	Outstanding Television Movie, Mini-Series or Dramatic Special	Steel Magnolias	Won	
NAACP Image Awards	February 1, 2013	Outstanding Actor in a Television Movie, Mini-Series or Dramatic Special	Afemo Omilami	Nominated	
NAACP Image Awards	February 1, 2013	Outstanding Actor in a Television Movie, Mini-Series or Dramatic Special	Tory Kittles	Nominated	
NAACP Image Awards	February 1, 2013	Outstanding Actress in a Television Movie, Mini-Series or Dramatic Special	Alfre Woodard	Won	
NAACP Image Awards	February 1, 2013	Outstanding Actress in a Television Movie, Mini-Series or Dramatic Special	Jill Scott	Nominated	
NAACP Image Awards	February 1, 2013	Outstanding Actress in a Television Movie, Mini-Series or Dramatic Special	Phylicia Rashad	Nominated	
NAACP Image Awards	February 1, 2013	Outstanding Actress in a Television Movie, Mini-Series or Dramatic Special	Queen Latifah	Nominated	
Primetime Emmy Awards	September 22, 2013	Outstanding Supporting Actress in a Limited or Anthology Series or Movie	Alfre Woodard	Nominated	
Screen Actors Guild Awards	January 27, 2013	Outstanding Performance by a Female Actor in a Miniseries or Television Movie	Alfre Woodard	Nominated	
Women's Image Network Awards	December 11, 2013	TV Show Produced by a Woman	Queen Latifah	Nominated	
