= 61st Street (TV series) =

2022 American legal drama television series

- Genre: Legal drama; Crime thriller
- Created by: Peter Moffat
- Starring: Courtney B. Vance; Tosin Cole; Bentley Green; Holt McCallany; Aunjanue Ellis; Andrene Ward-Hammond; Mark O'Brien
- Music by: Laura Karpman
- Country of origin: United States
- Original language: English
- No. of seasons: 2
- No. of episodes: 16

Production
- Executive producers: Peter Moffat; Michael B. Jordan; Alana Mayo; Hilary Salmon; Courtney B. Vance; J. David Shanks
- Production companies: AMC Studios; Outlier Society; BBC Studios

Original release
- Network: AMC
- Release: April 10 – May 29, 2022
- Network: The CW
- Release: July 22 – September 9, 2024

61st Street is an American legal drama television series created by Peter Moffat that premiered on AMC on April 10, 2022. A second season was produced; however, in January 2023, AMC decided against airing it. In May 2023, The CW acquired the series, rebroadcasting the first season in the US on July 22, 2023, on The CW app exclusively and then airing it on linear TV in October 2023. The second season premiered on July 22, 2024.

== Premise of pilot ==
Moses Johnson, a promising, black high school athlete, is swept up into the infamously corrupt Chicago criminal justice system. Taken by the police as a supposed gang member, Johnson finds himself and his lawyer Franklin Roberts in the eye of the storm as police and prosecutors seek revenge for the death of an officer during a drug bust gone wrong.

== Cast and characters ==
=== Main ===
- Courtney B. Vance as Franklin Roberts
- Tosin Cole as Moses Johnson (season 1)
- Bentley Green as Joshua Johnson
- Holt McCallany as Lt. Brannigan
- Aunjanue Ellis as Martha Roberts
- Andrene Ward-Hammond as Norma Johnson
- Mark O'Brien as Officer Logan

=== Recurring ===
- Patrick Mulvey as Michael Rossi (season 1)
- Rebecca Spence as Jessica Rossi
- Jarell Maximillian Sullivan as David Roberts
- Matthew Elam as TJ (season 1; guest season 2)
- Jon Michael Hill as Pastor Richards
- Ben Barten as James Frater
- Kamal Angelo Bolden as Young
- Emily Althaus as Nicole Carter
- James Vincent Meredith as Dr. Algren (season 1; guest season 2)
- Erik Hellman as Peter
- Julian Parker as Dante Blake
- Jerod Haynes as Big Phil
- Malkia Stampley as Marisol
- Rashada Dawan as Janet Porter (season 1)
- Madison Dirks as Marty Gallagher
- Morocco Omari as Speak (season 1)
- Sammy A. Publes as Coach Angelo (season 1)
- Michael Patrick Thornton as Michael Patrick Thornton (season 1)
- Jayson Lee as Calvin Harris (season 1)
- Al'Jaleel McGhee as Lotty
- Antonie Pierre as Deputy Moss (season 1)
- David Parkes as Rick Leonard (season 2; guest season 1)
- Manuk Aret as Alex (season 2; guest season 1)
- Karen Aldridge as Naimah Watts (season 2)
- Paul Turner as Wayne Morris (season 2)
- Brenda Strong as Kim Pearson (season 2)

== Episodes ==
=== Series overview ===
Season	Episodes	Originally released		
Season	Episodes	First released	Last released	Network
1	8	April 10, 2022	May 29, 2022	AMC
2	8	July 22, 2024	September 9, 2024	The CW

=== Season 1 (2022) ===
No. overall	No. in season	Title	Directed by	Written by	Original release date	U.S. viewers (millions)
1	1	"Pilot"	Marta Cunningham	Peter Moffat	April 10, 2022	0.39
2	2	"The Hunter and the Hunted"	Marta Cunningham	Olumide Odebunmi & Tolu Awosika	April 17, 2022	0.22
3	3	"Barefoot and Dangerous"	Ramaa Mosley	Allison Davis	April 24, 2022	0.22
4	4	"Chess Moves and Poker Chips"	Ramaa Mosley	J. David Shanks	May 1, 2022	0.22
5	5	"Over the Wall"	Ali Selim	Sarah Beckett	May 8, 2022	0.18
6	6	"Sins of the Fathers"	Ali Selim	Frank Baldwin	May 15, 2022	0.16
7	7	"The Two Trials"	Darren Grant	Olumide Odebunmi & Tolu Awosika	May 22, 2022	0.17
8	8	"Man on Fire"	Darren Grant	Peter Moffat	May 29, 2022	0.16

=== Season 2 (2024) ===
No. overall	No. in season	Title	Directed by	Written by	Australia air date	U.S. air date	U.S. viewers (millions)
9	1	"After the Morning After"	Solvan 'Slick' Naim	Allison Davis	July 4, 2023	July 22, 2024	0.21
10	2	"Trust Me"	Solvan 'Slick' Naim	Sarah Beckett	July 4, 2023	July 29, 2024	0.18
11	3	"Do No Harm"	Michael Trim	Frank Baldwin	July 11, 2023	August 5, 2024	0.17
12	4	"Kamikaze"	Michael Trim	Olumide Odebunmi & Tolu Awosika	July 18, 2023	August 12, 2024	0.20
13	5	"Two Truths and a Lie"	Erin K. Feeley	Allison Davis	July 25, 2023	August 19, 2024	0.18
14	6	"Argue the Facts"	Erin K. Feeley	J. David Shanks	August 1, 2023	August 26, 2024	0.18
15	7	"The Offer"	Ramaa Mosley	Frank Baldwin	August 8, 2023	September 2, 2024	0.16
16	8	"Judgement Day"	Ramaa Mosley	Frank Baldwin	August 15, 2023	September 9, 2024	0.15

== Production ==
=== Development ===
In February 2019, AMC began development on 61st Street which was created by Peter Moffat who is executive producing alongside Michael B. Jordan and Alana Mayo. In October 2019, AMC greenlighted the series and gave it a two-season order, with each season consisting of eight episodes. Series star Courtney B. Vance serves as an executive producer.

=== Casting ===
In January 2020, Courtney B. Vance, Tosin Cole and Bentley Green were cast in the series. In May 2020, Eric Lange was cast in the series. In February 2021, Holt McCallany replaced Lange; and Aunjanue Ellis, Killian Scott, and Andrene Ward-Hammond were cast in the series. In March 2021, Jerod Haynes was cast in the series. In May 2021, Mark O'Brien replaced Killian Scott as Officer Logan in the series.

== Release ==
The series was originally set to premiere in 2021. The premiere was delayed and it premiered on April 10, 2022. The second season of the series had already been filmed, but was dropped by AMC as part of cost-cutting measures announced in December 2022. In May 2023, The CW acquired the series. The second season premiered on July 4, 2023 on Australian streaming service Stan.

== Reception ==
The review aggregator website Rotten Tomatoes reported a 69% approval rating with an average rating of 6.2/10, based on 16 critic reviews. The website's critics consensus reads, "61st Street is situated smack dab in a clichéd zip code of television drama, but terrific performances by Courtney B. Vance and a strong supporting cast provide some local attraction." Metacritic, which uses a weighted average, assigned a score of 66 out of 100 based on 11 critics, indicating "generally favorable reviews".
