= Waiting to Be Invited =

2000 play by S. M. Shephard-Massat

- Original language: English
- Written by: S. M. Shephard-Massat
- Subject: Civil Rights Movement
- Genre: Drama
- Setting: Atlanta, Georgia, 1964

Premiere
- Date: January 20, 2000
- Place: Denver Center Theatre Company, Denver, Colorado

Waiting to Be Invited is a play by S. M. Shephard-Massat set in the Jim Crow South during the American Civil Rights Movement.

== Plot ==
Waiting to Be Invited is set in Atlanta, Georgia, in the summer of 1964, shortly after the United States Supreme Court ruled that segregation was unconstitutional. The play follows a group of Black women who test the ruling by attempting to be served at an all-white lunch counter.

== Production history ==
=== Denver (2000) ===
Waiting to Be Invited premiered at the Denver Center Theatre Company in Denver, Colorado. The production opened on January 20, 2000, and was directed by Israel Hicks.

Cast

- Lynette Du Pre as Miss Louise
- Candy Brown Houston as Miss Delores
- Ebony Jo-Ann as Miss Odessa
- Keith L. Hatten as Palmeroy Bateman
- Jane Welch as Miss Grayson
- Michele Shay as Miss Ruth

=== Seattle (2001) ===
In 2001, the play was produced by A Contemporary Theatre (ACT) in Seattle, Washington. The production ran from August 23 to September 16, 2001, and was directed by Israel Hicks.

Cast

- Demene Hall as Miss Louise
- Ebony Jo-Ann as Miss Odessa
- Cynthia Jones as Miss Delores
- Michele Shay as Miss Ruth
- Keith L. Hatten as Palmeroy Bateman
- Jane Welch as Miss Grayson

=== Chicago (2002) ===
In 2002, Waiting to Be Invited was produced in Chicago by Victory Gardens Theater. The production ran from January 18 to March 3, 2002, and was directed by Ilesa Duncan.

Cast

- Velma Austin as Miss Louise
- Kimberly Hebert-Gregory as Miss Ruth
- Irma P. Hall as Miss Odessa
- Kenn E. Head as Palmeroy Bateman
- Mary Ann Thebus as Miss Grayson
- Jacqueline Williams as Miss Delores

== Awards ==
Year	Award	Awarded by	Ref
1996	Adrienne Kennedy Award for Most Promising Young Dramatist	The Adrienne Kennedy Society	
1997	The Connections Award	Delaware Theatre Company	
1999	Roger L. Stevens Award	John F. Kennedy Center for the Performing Arts	
2001	Elizabeth M. Osborn Award for a New Play	American Theatre Critics Association	
