= Of Mind and Music =

- Film poster
- Directed by: Richie Adams
- Written by: Richie Adams; Nicolas Bazan
- Produced by: Richie Adams; Brent Caballero; Nicolas Bazan; Nancy Green-Keyes
- Starring: Joaquim de Almeida; Bill Cobbs; Ruth Negga; Andre Royo; Sharon Lawrence; Aunjanue Ellis
- Cinematography: Tom Lembcke
- Edited by: David Rogow
- Distributed by: Monterey Media (US)
- Release date: October 2014 (Heartland Film Festival)
- Running time: 98 minutes
- Country: United States
- Language: English

Of Mind and Music (previously titled Una Vida: A Fable of Music and Mind) is a 2014 American drama independent film based on the 2009 novel Una Vida: A Fable of Music and the Mind by Nicolas Bazan, and written by Richie Adams and Nicolas Bazan. The film is directed by Richie Adams and stars Aunjanue Ellis, Joaquim de Almeida, Bill Cobbs, Sharon Lawrence, and Ruth Negga.

== Plot ==
Neuroscientist Dr. Alvaro Cruz returns home from a lecture in Paris, heartbroken and disillusioned. In his absence, his mother has succumbed to Alzheimer's disease.

As he decides to take some time off work and reconnect with the love of music that he shared with his mother finding solace in the music that permeates New Orleans' French Quarter, he hears the mesmerizing voice of Una Vida for the first time. After repeat visits to hear her sing, he realizes that she is suffering from Alzheimer's disease and that her unconventional "family" cannot cope with her declining health.

Cruz puzzles his wife, Angela, by seeking out Una Vida's long lost son in hopes of finally giving her resolution to the grief, loss and longing that has overshadowed her difficult but also beautiful life.

== Cast ==
- Joaquim de Almeida as Dr. Alvaro Cruz
- Aunjanue Ellis as Una Vida
- Bill Cobbs as Stompleg
- Ruth Negga as Jessica
- Sharon Lawrence as Angela Cruz
- Andre Royo as Kenny
- Marcus Lyle Brown as Sam

== Production ==
=== Development ===
Of Mind and Music was shot in New Orleans, Louisiana. Director Richie Adams along with Dr. Bazan (novel writer, screenplay writer, and producer), and producer Brent Caballero chose the filming locations in New Orleans as between the three of them they found that at least one had a connection to someone who owned a particular location where they shot a scene.
