= Mary Ann (Ray Charles song) =

Single by Ray Charles
- Released: 1956
- Genre: Rhythm & blues, blues
- Length: 2:48
- Label: Atlantic
- Songwriter(s): Ray Charles

Ray Charles singles chronology
"Hallelujah I Love Her So" (1956)	"Mary Ann" (1956)	"Lonely Avenue" (1956)

"Mary Ann" is a song written and performed by Ray Charles and released in 1956 as a single on the Atlantic Records label. It was the fourth Ray Charles song to reach No. 1 on the Billboard Best Selling Rhythm & Blues chart. The song is set to a Latin beat, but switches into a swing rhythm, an alternation that adds fun for the dancers. It has been described as "a sexy blues," and "a lightly lascivious tune."

The song was written about Mary Ann Fisher (1923–2004), a singer who had recently joined Charles band as a featured vocalist in his touring shows. Despite Charles' marriage, the two became lovers, and Fisher appears on a number of his Atlantic recordings. Fisher left Ray Charles in 1958 after he had added the Raelettes, formerly the Cookies, as female vocal backup to his band.
