= Christina Bell =

Retired American soccer player

Personal information
- Date of birth: July 2, 1975 (age 50)
- Place of birth: Santa Rosa, California
- Positions: Forward; midfielder

College career
Years	Team	Apps	(Gls)
1993–1995	Sonoma State Cossacks		
1996–1998	Fresno State Bulldogs		(12)

Senior career*
Years	Team	Apps	(Gls)
2001–2003	San Jose CyberRays	26	(2)
- * Club domestic league appearances and goals

Christina Bell (born July 2, 1975, in Santa Rosa, California) is a retired American soccer player who played for the San Jose CyberRays.

== Early life and education ==
Bell was born in Santa Rosa, California on July 2, 1975. She attended Montgomery High School, where she played both basketball and soccer and graduated in 1993. Following graduation, she attended Sonoma State University, then transferred to California State University, Fresno, graduating in 1998.

== Career ==
Bell started her university career at Sonoma State University, where she played from 1993 to 1995. In 1996, she transferred to Fresno State University, where she played for the university's women's soccer team for two seasons. In her second year at the university, she received the Western Athletic Conference's Stan Bates Award, which is presented annually to the most outstanding scholar-athlete who excels in both athletic and academic achievements. She was named the team's Most Valuable Player for both season. The university retired her number in 2001, the university's first woman soccer player to have received the honor.

After graduating in 1998, Bell played for the Women's Dutch Premier League, the only person on the team from the United States.

In 2000, Bell made her professional debut in the Women's United Soccer Association, having been drafted in the thirteenth round to the San Jose CyberRays.

Beginning in 2003, Bell was the assistant coach at San Jose State University.
