= Zie'l =

- Origin: Shreveport, Louisiana
- Genres: Christian R&B, urban contemporary gospel, contemporary R&B, soul
- Years active: 1998–present
- Labels: Light, Dream
- Members: Keyondra Lockett; Christina Bell; Crystal Bell
- Past members: Aphten Jones; Undrea Northcutt-Daniels
- Website: officialziel.com

Zie'l are an African-American all-female Christian R&B and urban contemporary gospel group, who primarily plays contemporary R&B and soul music. They come from Shreveport, Louisiana, where the group started making music in 1998. The group have released two studio albums, Genesis and Zie'l (Pronounced Zy-El). Their second album was the groups breakthrough album on the Billboard magazine charts. It has been announced lead singer Christina Bell will be portraying Twinkie Clark in upcoming biopic on The Clark Sisters set to air on Lifetime.

== Background ==
The all-female African-American group are from Shreveport, Louisiana, where they formed in 1998. Their current members are Christina Bell, a contralto, Crystal Bell, a soprano, and, Keyondra Lockett, a mezzo-soprano, with their two former members being Aphten Jones who was the second to leave the group, while the first was Undrea Northcutt-Daniels. The group have gone from a quintet to a quartet, and now being a trio.

== Music history ==
The group started in 1998, while their first studio album, Genesis, was released on July 25, 2006, by Light Records. Their subsequent studio album, Zie'l (Pronounced Zy-El), was released on September 2, 2014, with Dream Gospel Records. The album was their breakthrough release upon the Billboard magazine Gospel Albums chart, where it peaked at No. 24.

== Members ==
Current members

- Christina Michelle Bell (born February 27, 1985)-(tenor) Soprano
- Crystal Kay Bell (born April 17, 1983)– (Soprano) soprano
- Keyondra Shane Lockett (born November 30, 1984) – (Alto) Soprano

Former members

- Aphten Leonteen Jones (born October 17, 1983)
- Undrea LaShun Northcutt-Daniels (born August 2, 1983)

== Discography ==
Studio albums

- Genesis (July 25, 2006, Light)
- Zie'l (Pronounced Zy-El) (September 2, 2014, Dream)
