= Abducted: The Carlina White Story =

2012 American film

- Written by: Elizabeth Hunter
- Directed by: Vondie Curtis-Hall
- Starring: Aunjanue Ellis; Keke Palmer; Sherri Shepherd; Roger Cross
- Theme music composer: Terence Blanchard
- Countries of origin: United States; Canada
- Original language: English

Production
- Producers: Mary Martin; Craig Piligian; Alan Gasner
- Running time: 90 minutes
- Production company: Pilgrim Studios

Original release
- Network: Lifetime
- Release: October 6, 2012

Abducted: The Carlina White Story is a Lifetime television film about Carlina White, who was abducted as an infant by Ann Pettway from a New York hospital and solved her own kidnapping and reunited with her biological parents 23 years later. The case is reported to be the first known infant abduction from a New York hospital. On July 30, 2012, Pettway was sentenced in a New York court to 12 years in prison for kidnapping Carlina. The movie premiered on October 6, 2012.

== Plot synopsis ==
In August 1987, new parents Joy White and Carl Tyson took their 19-day-old daughter Carlina to Harlem Hospital in New York City with a high fever. Annugetta "Ann" Pettway, who had suffered a series of miscarriages and was desperate for a baby, posed as a hospital nurse and walked out of the hospital with Carlina hidden from view. While Joy and Carl desperately searched for their daughter over the years, Pettway was raising Carlina as Nejdra "Netty" Nance in Bridgeport, Connecticut, a mere 45 miles from New York City. As Carlina grew older, she began to suspect that Ann was not her real mother and launched her own investigation. After contacting the National Center for Missing and Exploited Children, Carlina was reunited with her parents in January 2011. On July 30, 2012, following a trial, Pettway was found guilty for kidnapping Carlina and was sentenced to 12 years in prison.

== Cast ==
- Aunjanue Ellis as Ann Pettway
- Keke Palmer as Carlina White
- Sherri Shepherd as Joy White
  - Heather-Claire Nortey as Young Joy White
- Roger Cross as Carl Tyson
  - Eli Goree as Young Carl Tyson
- Heather Doerksen as Agent Thompson
- Alyssa Wellington as Maya White

== Reception ==
=== Critical reception ===
Sandy Hoffman of AIDY Reviews said the film was an emotionless wreck that did not do the story justice. Laura Fries of Variety said the film felt a little incomplete.

=== Ratings ===
Abducted: The Carlina White Story earned 4.09 million viewers in its first airing on October 6, 2012, on Lifetime.
