= Tina Mabry =

American film director and screenwriter

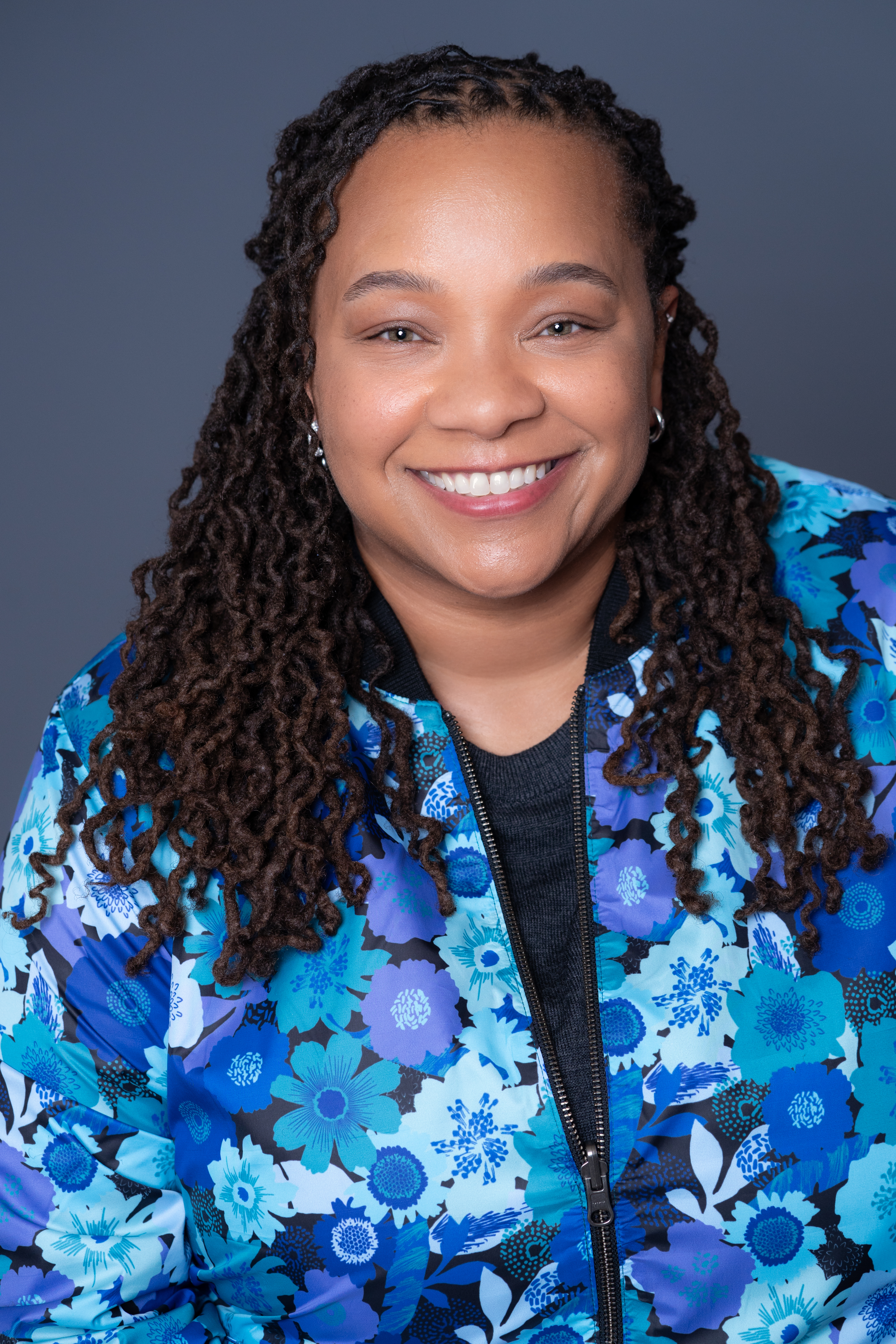
- Born: February 9, 1978 (age 48); Tupelo, Mississippi, United States
- Occupations: Director, Screenwriter, Producer

Tina Mabry (born February 9, 1978) is an American film director and screenwriter from Tupelo, Mississippi. Following the release of her first feature film Mississippi Damned (2009), she was named one of '25 New Faces of Indie Film' by Filmmaker magazine and among the 'Top Forty Under 40' by The Advocate. Mabry was named a James Baldwin Fellow in Media by United States Artists.

== Early life ==
Tina Mabry was born in Tupelo, Mississippi, in 1978. After seeing Kimberly Peirce's Boys Don't Cry and Gina Prince-Bythewood's Love & Basketball while an undergrad at the University of Mississippi, she determined she had to go into film and moved to Los Angeles. She received her Masters of Fine Arts in Cinema and Television from the University of Southern California.

== See also ==
- List of female film and television directors
- List of lesbian filmmakers
- List of LGBT-related films directed by women
