= Guild of Music Supervisors Award for Best Song Written and/or Recorded for Television =

The Best Song Written and/or Recorded for Television award is annually given by the Guild of Music Supervisors to honor the recording of a song, created directly for a television production. It was first given at their sixth annual awards function, and has continued to be ever since.

== Winners and Nominees ==
=== 2010s ===
Year	Show	Song	Composers	Recording Artists	Music Supervisor	Ref
2015	Empire (1x08 - "The Lyon's Roar")	"You're So Beautiful"	Jim Beanz, Jussie Smollett, Justin Bostwick	Jussie Smollett	Jen Ross, Dave Jordan	
2015	Bessie	"Long Old Road"	Bessie Smith	Queen Latifah		
2015	Girls (4x10 - "Home Birth")	"Riverside"	Michael Penn	Allison Williams	Manish Raval, Tom Wolfe, Jonathan Leahy	
2015	Nashville (3x17 - "This Just Ain’t a Good Day for Leavin'")	"Longer"	Andrea Davidson	Clare Bowen and Sam Palladio	Frankie Pine	
2015	Texas Rising (1x05 - "The Rise of the Republic")	"Take Me to Texas"	Brandy Clark, Shane McAnally	George Strait	Greg Cahn	
2016	The Get Down (1x05 - "You Have Wings, Learn to Fly")	"Set Me Free"	Louie Rubio, Alex Shultz, Raja Kumari, Baz Luhrmann	Herizen F. Guardiola, featuring Nile Rodgers and The Americanos	—N/a	
2016	Empire (2x10 - "Et Tu, Brute")	"Powerful"	Jussie Smollett, J.R. Rotem, Talay Riley	Jussie Smollett and Alicia Keys	Jen Ross, Dave Jordan	
2016	Girls (5x05 - "Queen for Two Days")	"Life on Mars"	David Bowie	AURORA	Manish Raval, Tom Wolfe, Jonathan Leahy	
2016	Rosewood (1x19 - "Sudden Deaths & Shapes Deep")	"Does She Love"	Gabriel Mann, Rebecca Kneubuhl, Jeannie Lurie	Gabrielle Dennis	—N/a	
2016	The Royals (2x10 - "The Serpent That Did Sting Thy Father’s Life")	"Half Light"	Dan Smith, Justin Parker	BANNΞRS	—N/a	
2017	Insecure (2x08 - "Hella Perspective")	"Quicksand"	SZA, D.J. Dahi, Mickey de Grand IV	SZA	Kier Lehman	
2017	Girls (6x09 - "Goodbye Tour")	"How Do We Get Back to Love"	Julia Michaels, Jack Antonoff	Julia Michaels	Manish Raval, Tom Wolfe, Jonathan Leahy	
2017	Nashville (5x05 - "I'll Fly Away")	"Sanctuary"	Jill Andrews, Gary Nicholson, Sarah Siskind	Charles Esten, Lennon Stella, Maisy Stella	Frankie Pine, Mandi Collier	
2017	Stitchers (3x09 - "Kill It Forward")	"Until You Find Me"	Dani Buncher, Scott Simons	Allison Scagliotti	Heather Guibert	
2017	This Is Us (1x16 - "Memphis")	"We Can Always Come Back to This"	Chris Pierce, Siddhartha Kholsa	Brian Tyree Henry, Hannah Miller	Jennifer Pyken	
2018	Black-ish (5x01 - "Juneteenth")	"Juneteenth"	Aloe Blacc, Peter Saji Derek Watkins, Faune Watkins, Hilton Wright	Cast of Black-ish	Gabe Hilfer	
2018	The Assassination of Gianni Versace: American Crime Story (2x04 - "House by the Lake")	"Drive"	Ric Ocasek	Aimee Mann	Amanda Krieg Thomas	
2018	Empire (4x09- "Slave to Memory")	"Trapped"	Timothy Clayton, James David Washington	Bryshere Y. Gray, Jussie Smollett	Jen Ross	
2018	Insecure (3x08 - "Ghost-Like")	"The Glow"	Willie Hutch	Victoria Monét	Kier Lehman	
2018	Sierra Burgess Is a Loser	"Sunflower"	Lindsey Beer, Bram Inscore, Leland, Troye Sivan, Allie X	Shannon Purser	Jonathan Watkins	
2019	Better Call Saul (4x07 - "Something Stupid")	"Somethin' Stupid"	C. Carson Parks	Lola Marsh	Thomas Golubic	
2019	A Million Little Things (1x01 - "Pilot")	"All These Things That I've Done"	Brandon Flowers, Dave Keuning, Mark Stoermer, Ronnie Vannucci, Jr	Gabriel Mann	Kevin Edelman	
2019	Black Mirror (5x03 - "Rachel, Jack and Ashley Too")	"On a Roll"	Trent Reznor	Miley Cyrus as Ashley O	Amelia Hartley	
2019	Game of Thrones (8x02 - "A Knight of the Seven Kingdoms")	"Jenny of Oldstones"	David Benioff, Ramin Djawadi, George R.R. Martin, D.B. Weiss	Florence + the Machine	Evyen Koran	
2019	This Is Us (3x07 - "Sometimes")	"Invisible Ink"	Taylor Goldsmith, Siddhartha Kholsa	Mandy Moore	Manish Raval, Tom Wolfe	

=== 2020s ===
Year	Show	Song	Composers	Recording Artists	Music Supervisor	Network	Ref
2020	Watchmen (1x06 - "This Extraordinary Being")	"The Way It Used to Be"	Trent Reznor and Atticus Ross		Liza Richardson	HBO	
2020	The Affair (5x11 - "Episode 5.11")	"The Whole of the Moon"	Mike Scott	Fiona Apple	Michael Hill	Showtime	
2020	Little Fires Everywhere (1x08 - "Find a Way")	"Build It Up"	Ingrid Michaelson		Mary Ramos	Hulu	
2020	The Marvelous Mrs. Maisel (3x01 - "Strike Up the Band")	"One Less Angel"	Thomas Mizer, Curtis Moore	Darius de Haas	Robin Urdang	Prime Video	
2020	This Is Us (4x01 - "Strangers")	"Memorized"	Taylor Goldsmith, Siddhartha Khosla	Blake Stadnik	Manish Raval, Tom Wolfe	NBC	
2021	Sex Education (302 and 307)	"F*** The Pain Away"	Merrill Nisker (aka Peaches)	The Moordale Singers and Oli Julian	Matt Biffa	Netflix	
2021	Homeroom	"Look At Us"	Mike Aaberg, Joseph Epperson, Lauren Evans, Mounir Ghantous, Tony Ghantous, Goapele K. Mohlbane, Faraji Wright	Goapele (feat. Rexx Life Raj)	Julie Glaze Houlihan	Hulu	
2021	To All the Boys: Always and Forever	"Beginning Middle End"	Leah Nobel, Quinn Redmond	Leah Nobel	Laura Webb, Lindsay Wolfington	Netflix	
2021	We the People (1x01 - "Active Citizenship")	"Change"	Ronald Colson, Jeff Gitelman, David Harris, Maxx Moore, Gabriella Wilson	H.E.R.	Jen Ross	Netflix	
2021	Zoey's Extraordinary Playlist (2x09 - "Zoey's Extraordinary Mystery")	"Anyone"	Badriia Ines Bourelly, Dayyon Alexander Drinkard, Demi Lovato, Eyelar Mirzazadeh, Jay Mooncie, Samuel Elliot Roman	Cast of Zoey's Extraordinary Playlist (Skylar Astin)	Jen Ross	NBC	
2021	Better Call Saul (6x09 - "Fun and Games")	"Perfect Day"	Harry Nilsson	Dresage, Slow Shiver	Thomas Golubić	AMC	
2021	Acapulco (1x10 – "You Should Hear How She Talks About You")	"Walking on Sunshine"	Kimberley Rew	Rodrigo Urquidi, Rossana de León	Javier Nuño, Joe Rodriguez	Apple TV+	
2021	The Marvelous Mrs. Maisel – (4x05 - "How to Chew Quietly and Influence People")	"Maybe Monica"	Tom Mizer, Curtis Moore	Josh A. Dawson	Robin Urdang	Prime Video	
2021	The Afterparty (1x03 – "Yasper")	"Two Shots"	Jack Dolgen, Jonathan Lajoie	Ben Schwartz, Sam Richardson, Jamie Demetriou	Kier Lehman	Apple TV+	
2021	MOOD (1x06 - "F* the Fake Sh")	"Trouble"	Nicôle Lecky, Camille Purcell, Kwame Kwei-Armah Jr	Lecky	Ed Bailie, Abi Leland	BBC America	
2021	Pachinko (1x08 – "Chapter Eight")	"Let's Live for Today"	Michael Julien, Guilio Rapetti Mogol, Norman David Shapiro	Leenalchi	Michael Hill		
2021	Rap Sh!t (1x03– "Something for the Hood", 1x04 – "Something for the Clubs", 1x05 – "Something for the Weekend", 1x06 – "Something for the Gram", 1x07 – “Something for the DJ", 1x08 – "Something for the Road")	"Seduce & Scheme"	Larry Dwayne Batiste, Isaac Earl Bynum, Khia Chambers, Brittany Dickinson, Aida Goitom, Floyd Nathaniel Hills, Clayton Richardson, Seandrea Sledge, Bill Summers. Kevin Toney, Michael J. Williams	Shawna & Mia	Sarah Bromberg, Stephanie Diaz-Matos, Philippe Pierre	HBO Max	
2021	P-Valley (2x06 – "Savage", 2x09 – "Snow")	"Get It on the Floor"	Julian Mason, Antwon D. Moore, Megan Pete, Kelton Lanier Scott II	J. Alphonse Nicholson, Megan Thee Stallion	Sarah Bromberg, Stephanie Diaz-Matos, Katori Hall	Starz	
