= Glenn Taylor (writer) =

Canadian writer

Glenn Taylor is a Canadian writer. He is most noted as co-writer with R. T. Thorne of the 2024 film 40 Acres, for which they won the Canadian Screen Award for Best Original Screenplay at the 14th Canadian Screen Awards in 2026.

His debut short story collection, The Book of Lost Innocence, was published in 2025.
