= NAACP Image Award for Outstanding Directing in a Motion Picture =

American film award

This article lists the winners and nominees for the NAACP Image Award for Outstanding Directing in a Motion Picture.

== Winners and nominees ==
For each year in the tables below, the winner is listed first and highlighted in bold.

=== 2000s ===
Year	Director(s)	Film	Ref
2006	**John Singleton**	**Four Brothers**	
2006	Thomas Carter	Coach Carter	
2006	George C. Wolfe	Lackawanna Blues	
2006	Malcolm D. Lee	Roll Bounce	
2006	Tim Story	Fantastic Four	
2007	**Spike Lee**	**Inside Man**	
2007	Alejandro González Iñárritu	Babel	
2007	Chris Robinson	ATL	
2007	Sanaa Hamri	Something New	
2007	Tyler Perry	Madea's Family Reunion	
2008	**Kasi Lemmons**	**Talk to Me**	
2008	Denzel Washington	The Great Debaters	
2008	Preston A. Whitmore II	This Christmas	
2008	Sunu Gonera	Pride	
2008	Sylvain White	Stomp the Yard	
2009	**Gina Prince-Bythewood**	**The Secret Life of Bees**	
2009	Darnell Martin	Cadillac Records	
2009	Tyler Perry	The Family That Preys	
2009	Patrik-Ian Polk	Noah's Arc: Jumping the Broom	
2009	Spike Lee	Miracle at St. Anna	

=== 2010s ===
Year	Director(s)	Film	Ref
2010	**Lee Daniels**	**Precious**	
2010	Scott Sanders	Black Dynamite	
2010	F. Gary Gray	Law Abiding Citizen	
2010	George Tillman, Jr.	Notorious	
2010	Spike Lee	Passing Strange	
2011	**Tyler Perry**	**For Colored Girls**	
2011	George Tillman, Jr.	Faster	
2011	Albert and Allen Hughes	The Book of Eli	
2011	Tanya Hamilton	Night Catches Us	
2011	Geoffrey Sax	Frankie and Alice	
2012	**Salim Akil**	**Jumping the Broom**	
2012	Alrick Brown	Kinyarwanda	
2012	Angelina Jolie	In the Land of Blood and Honey	
2012	Dee Rees	Pariah	
2012	Tate Taylor	The Help	
2013	**Benh Zeitlin**	**Beasts of the Southern Wild**	
2013	Vondie Curtis-Hall	Abducted: The Carlina White Story	
2013	Tim Story	Think Like A Man	
2013	Peter Ramsey	Rise of the Guardians	
2013	Anthony Hemingway	Red Tails	
2014	**Steve McQueen**	**12 Years a Slave**	
2014	Jono Oliver	Home	
2014	Justin Chadwick	Mandela: Long Walk to Freedom	
2014	Lee Daniels	Lee Daniels' The Butler	
2014	Malcolm D. Lee	The Best Man Holiday	
2015	**Antoine Fuqua**	**The Equalizer**	
2015	Amma Asante	Belle	
2015	Ava DuVernay	Selma	
2015	John Ridley	Jimi: All Is by My Side	
2015	Gina Prince-Bythewood	Beyond the Lights	
2016	**Ryan Coogler**	**Creed**	
2016	Rick Famuyiwa	Dope	
2016	Alfonso Gomez-Rejon	Me and Earl and the Dying Girl	
2016	Charles Stone III	Lila and Eve	
2016	F. Gary Gray	Straight Outta Compton	
2017	**Barry Jenkins**	**Moonlight**	
2017	Nate Parker	The Birth of a Nation	
2017	Anthony and Joe Russo	Captain America: Civil War	
2017	Garth Davis	Lion	
2017	Mira Nair	Queen of Katwe	
2018	**Jordan Peele**	**Get Out**	
2018	Reginald Hudlin	Marshall	
2018	Malcolm D. Lee	Girls Trip	
2018	Stella Meghie	Everything, Everything	
2018	Dee Rees	Mudbound	
2019	**Ryan Coogler**	**Black Panther**	
2019	Alan Hicks and Rashida Jones	Quincy	
2019	Barry Jenkins	If Beale Street Could Talk	
2019	Spike Lee	BlacKkKlansman	
2019	Steve McQueen	Widows	

=== 2020s ===
Year	Director(s)	Film	Ref
2020	**Chiwetel Ejiofor**	**The Boy Who Harnessed the Wind**	
2020	Mati Diop	Atlantics	
2020	Reginald Hudlin	The Black Godfather	
2020	Kasi Lemmons	Harriet	
2020	Jordan Peele	Us	
2021	**Gina Prince-Bythewood**	**The Old Guard**	
2021	David E. Talbert	Jingle Jangle: A Christmas Journey	
2021	George C. Wolfe	Ma Rainey's Black Bottom	
2021	Radha Blank	The Forty-Year-Old Version	
2021	Regina King	One Night in Miami...	
2022	**Shaka King**	**Judas and the Black Messiah**	
2022	Denzel Washington	A Journal for Jordan	
2022	Jeymes Samuel	The Harder They Fall	
2022	Lin-Manuel Miranda	Tick, Tick... Boom!	
2022	Reinaldo Marcus Green	King Richard	
2023	**Gina Prince-Bythewood**	**The Woman King**	
2023	Antoine Fuqua	Emancipation	
2023	Chinonye Chukwu	Till	
2023	Kasi Lemmons	Whitney Houston: I Wanna Dance with Somebody	
2023	Ryan Coogler	Black Panther: Wakanda Forever	
2024	**Ava DuVernay**	**Origin**	
2024	Antoine Fuqua	The Equalizer 3	
2024	George C. Wolfe	Rustin	
2024	Juel Taylor	They Cloned Tyrone	
2024	Michael B. Jordan	Creed III	
2025	**RaMell Ross**	**Nickel Boys**	
2025	Jeymes Samuel	The Book of Clarence	
2025	Malcolm Washington	The Piano Lesson	
2025	Reinaldo Marcus Green	Bob Marley: One Love	
2025	Steve McQueen	Blitz	
2026	**Ryan Coogler**	**Sinners**	
2026	Elijah Bynum	Magazine Dreams	
2026	Guillermo Del Toro	Frankenstein	
2026	Lawrence Lamont	One of Them Days	
2026	R.T. Thorne	40 Acres	

== Multiple wins and nominations ==
=== Wins ===
3 wins

- Ryan Coogler

2 wins

- Gina Prince-Bythewood

=== Nominations ===
4 nominations

- Ryan Coogler
- Spike Lee

3 nominations

- Malcolm D. Lee
- Tyler Perry
- Gina Prince-Bythewood

2 nominations

- Kasi Lemmons
- George C. Wolfe
- Tim Story
- Lee Daniels
- F. Gary Gray
- George Tillman, Jr.
- Dee Rees
- Steve McQueen
- Ryan Coogler
- Barry Jenkins
- Reginald Hudlin
- Jordan Peele
- Denzel Washington
