= 26th Annual Black Reel Awards =

Film-industry awards in 2026

26th Black Reel Awards
- Date: February 16, 2026 (Film); August 17th, 2026 (Television)

Highlights
- Most wins: Sinners (14)
- Most nominations: Sinners (21)
- Outstanding Film: Sinners

The 26th Annual Black Reel Awards ceremony, presented by the Foundation for the Augmentation of African-Americans in Film (FAAAF) and honoring the best films of 2025, took place during a virtual ceremony on February 16, 2026.

The film nominations were announced on December 18, 2025. Ryan Coogler's supernatural horror film Sinners led with a record-breaking twenty-one nominations, followed by Highest 2 Lowest with eleven, and 40 Acres and On Becoming a Guinea Fowl, both with nine each. The category for Outstanding Independent Documentary was introduced.

Sinners was the most awarded film of the ceremony history with fourteen accolades, surpassing the previous record of ten awards won by Black Panther in 2019. The film also won all three acting categories, becoming the first film to achieve it since the categories merged into gender neutral in 2024. Ludwig Göransson became first person to win Outstanding Score and Original Song in the same year on the ceremony history. Autumn Durald Arkapaw became the first woman to win Outstanding Cinematography.

== Film nominees ==
Outstanding Film	Outstanding Director
Sinners – Zinzi Coogler, Sev Ohanian, and Ryan Coogler, producers; Hedda – Dede Gardner, Jeremy Kleiner, Gabrielle Nadig, Nia DaCosta, and Tessa Thompson, producers; Highest 2 Lowest – Todd Black and Jason Michael Berman, producers; One of Them Days – Issa Rae, Deniese Davis, Sara Rastogi, James Lopez, and Poppy Hank, producers; Wicked: For Good – Marc Platt and David Stone, producers	Ryan Coogler – Sinners; Nia DaCosta – Hedda; Spike Lee – Highest 2 Lowest; Rungano Nyoni – On Becoming a Guinea Fowl; R.T. Thorne – 40 Acres
Outstanding Lead Performance	Outstanding Supporting Performance
Michael B. Jordan – Sinners as Elijah "Smoke" Moore / Elias "Stack" Moore; Danielle Deadwyler – 40 Acres as Hailey Freeman; Cynthia Erivo – Wicked: For Good as Elphaba Thropp; André Holland – Love, Brooklyn as Roger; Chase Infiniti – One Battle After Another as Willa Ferguson / Charlene Calhoun; Dwayne Johnson – The Smashing Machine as Mark Kerr; Jonathan Majors – Magazine Dreams as Killian Maddox; Keke Palmer – One of Them Days as Dreux; Tessa Thompson – Hedda as Hedda Gabler; Denzel Washington – Highest 2 Lowest as David King	Wunmi Mosaku – Sinners as Annie; Miles Caton – Sinners as Samuel "Sammie" Moore; Regina Hall – One Battle After Another as Deandra / "Lady Champagne"; Damson Idris – F1 as Joshua Pearce; David Jonsson – The Long Walk as Peter "Pete" McVries; Delroy Lindo – Sinners as Delta Slim; Da'Vine Joy Randolph – Eternity as Anna; A$AP Rocky – Highest 2 Lowest as Archie/Yung Felon; Teyana Taylor – One Battle After Another as Perfidia Beverly Hills; Jeffrey Wright – Highest 2 Lowest as Paul Christopher
Outstanding Breakthrough Performance	Outstanding Ensemble
Miles Caton – Sinners as Samuel "Sammie" Moore; Susan Chardy – On Becoming a Guinea Fowl as Shula; Naya Desir-Johnson – Sarah's Oil as Sarah Rector; Damson Idris – F1 as Joshua Pearce; Chase Infiniti – One Battle After Another as Willa Ferguson / Charlene Calhoun; Jayme Lawson – Sinners as Pearline; A$AP Rocky – Highest 2 Lowest as Archie/Yung Felon; Abou Sangaré – Souleymane's Story as Souleymane; SZA – One of Them Days as Alyssa; Tyriq Withers – Him as Cameron "Cam" Cade	Sinners – Francine Maisler; 40 Acres – Stephanie Gorin; Highest 2 Lowest – Kim Coleman; On Becoming a Guinea Fowl – Isabella Odoffin; One of Them Days – Nicole Abellera and Jeanne McCarthy
Outstanding Short Film	Outstanding Documentary Feature
The Devil is Busy – Geeta Gandbhir and Christalyn Hampton, directors; Jules – Tiffany Abney, director; Walk in the Light – Princella Smith, director	The Perfect Neighbor – Geeta Gandbhir, director; Being Eddie – Angus Wall, director; In Whose Name? – Nico Ballesteros, director; Orwell: 2+2=5 – Raoul Peck, director; Songs from the Hole – Contessa Gayles, director
Outstanding International Film	Outstanding Independent Film
On Becoming a Guinea Fowl (Zambia, United Kingdom, Ireland) – Rungano Nyoni; My Father's Shadow (United Kingdom) – Akinola Davies Jr.; Night Call (Belgium) – Michiel Blanchart; Souleymane's Story (France) – Boris Lojkine; We Were Here – The Untold History of Black Africans in Renaissance Europe (Germany) – Fred Kudjo Kuwornu	40 Acres – R.T. Thorne, director; Love, Brooklyn – Rachael Holder, director; Magazine Dreams – Elijah Bynum, director; My Father's Shadow – Akinola Davies Jr., director; On Becoming a Guinea Fowl – Rungano Nyoni, director
Outstanding Screenplay	Outstanding First Screenplay
Sinners – Ryan Coogler; Hedda – Nia DaCosta; On Becoming a Guinea Fowl – Rungano Nyoni; One of Them Days – Syreeta Singleton; 40 Acres – R.T. Thorne	One of Them Days – Syreeta Singleton; The Knife – Nnamdi Asomugha; My Father's Shadow – Akinola Davies Jr. and Wale Davies; On Becoming a Guinea Fowl – Rungano Nyoni; 40 Acres – R.T. Thorne
Outstanding Emerging Director	Outstanding Voice Performance
R.T. Thorne – 40 Acres; Akinola Davies Jr. – My Father's Shadow; Rachael Holder – Love, Brooklyn; Kahlil Joseph – BLKNWS: Terms & Conditions; Rungano Nyoni – On Becoming a Guinea Fowl	Zoe Saldaña – Avatar: Fire and Ash as Neytiri; Danielle Brooks – The Bad Guys 2 as Kitty Kat; Quinta Brunson – Zootopia 2 as Dr. Fuzzby; Idris Elba – Zootopia 2 as Chief Bogo; Anthony Ramos – The Bad Guys 2 as Mr. Piranha
Outstanding Score	Outstanding Soundtrack
Sinners – Ludwig Göransson; Freaky Tales – Raphael Saadiq; Hedda – Hildur Guðnadóttir; Highest 2 Lowest – Howard Drossin; Sarah's Oil – Kathryn Bostic	Sinners; Freaky Tales; Highest 2 Lowest; One of Them Days; Wicked: For Good
Outstanding Original Song	Outstanding Cinematography
"I Lied to You" from Sinners – Miles Caton, performer; Raphael Saadiq and Ludwig Göransson, writers; "Highest 2 Lowest" from Highest 2 Lowest – Aiyana-Lee Anderson, performer; Aiyana-Lee Anderson and Nicole Daciana Anderson, writers; "Last Time (I Seen the Sun)" from Sinners – Miles Caton and Alice Smith, performers; Miles Caton, Alice Smith and Ludwig Göransson, writers; "Pale, Pale Moon" from Sinners – Brittany Howard, performer; Brittany Howard and Ludwig Göransson, writers; "Sinners" from Sinners – Rod Wave, performer; Darius Povillunas, Kyris D'Asia, Rod Wave and Tarkan Kozluklu, writers	Sinners – Autumn Durald Arkapaw; My Father's Shadow – Jermaine Canute Bradley Edwards; Him – Kira Kelly; After the Hunt – Malik Hassan Sayeed; Seeds – Brittany Shyne
Outstanding Editing	Outstanding Costume Design
Sinners – Michael P. Shawver; The Smashing Machine – Ronald Bronstein and Benny Safdie; BLKNWS: Terms & Conditions – Kahlil Joseph, Luke Lynch and Paul Rogers; Him – Taylor Joy Mason; Seeds – Malika Zouhali-Worrall	Wicked: For Good – Paul Tazewell; 40 Acres – Charlene Akuamoah; On Becoming a Guinea Fowl – Estelle Don Banda; Sinners – Ruth E. Carter; Highest 2 Lowest – Francine Jamison-Tanchuck
Outstanding Production Design	Outstanding Hairstyling & Makeup
Sinners – Hannah Beachler, production designer; Monique Champagne, set decorator; Captain America: Brave New World – Ramsey Avery, production designer; Rosemary Brandenburg, set decorator; Hedda – Cara Brower, production designer; Stella Fox, set decorator; The Smashing Machine – James Chinlund, production designer; Marcia Calosio, Mike Keel and Frank Okay, set decorators; Wicked: For Good – Nathan Crowley, production designer; Lee Sandales, set decorator	Sinners – Ken Diaz, Mike Fontaine, Sian Richards, and Shunika Terry; My Dead Friend Zoe – Amber Aprin and Mele Egbe; 40 Acres – Antonio Hines and Chancelle Mulela; The Smashing Machine – Kazu Hiro, Felix Fox and Mia Neal; One of Them Days – Vonda K. Morris and Nikki Wright
Outstanding Independent Documentary
We Were Here – The Untold History of Black Africans in Renaissance Europe – Fred Kudjo Kuwornu; BLKNWS: Terms & Conditions – Kahlil Joseph, director; The Eyes of Ghana – Ben Proudfoot, director; Fatherless No More – Kayla Johnson; Seeds – Brittany Shyne, director

== Films with multiple nominations and awards ==
The following films received multiple nominations:

Nominations	Film
21	Sinners
11	Highest 2 Lowest
9	40 Acres
9	On Becoming a Guinea Fowl
8	One of Them Days
6	Hedda
5	My Father's Shadow
5	Wicked: For Good
4	One Battle After Another
4	The Smashing Machine
3	BLKNWS: Terms & Conditions
3	Him
3	Love, Brooklyn
3	Seeds
2	Magazine Dreams
2	F1
2	Souleymane's Story
2	The Bad Guys 2
2	Zootopia 2
2	The Eyes of Ghana
2	We Were Here – The Untold History of Black Africans in Renaissance Europe

The following films received multiple awards:

Awards	Film
14	Sinners
2	40 Acres
