= One of Them Days =

2025 film by Syreeta Singleton

- Theatrical release poster
- Directed by: Lawrence Lamont
- Written by: Syreeta Singleton
- Produced by: Issa Rae; Deniese Davis; Sara Rastogi; James Lopez; Poppy Hanks
- Starring: Keke Palmer; SZA; Katt Williams
- Cinematography: Ava Berkofsky
- Edited by: Tia Nolan; Kim Boritz-Brehm
- Music by: Chanda Dancy
- Production companies: TriStar Pictures; MACRO; Hoorae Media; ColorCreative
- Distributed by: Sony Pictures Releasing
- Release date: January 17, 2025
- Running time: 97 minutes
- Country: United States
- Language: English
- Budget: $14 million
- Box office: $51.8 million

One of Them Days is a 2025 American buddy comedy film directed by Lawrence Lamont and written by Syreeta Singleton, both in their feature film debuts. The film stars Keke Palmer and SZA (in her film debut) as two friends who must scramble to find rent money after one of their boyfriends blows through it.

It was filmed in July 2024 and released in the United States and Canada by Sony Pictures Releasing on January 17, 2025. One of Them Days was a critical and commercial success, grossing over $51 million on a budget of $14 million. A sequel is in early development.

== Plot ==
Waitress Dreux Jones and aspiring artist Alyssa Brown live together along with Alyssa's ne'er-do-well boyfriend Keshawn in a rundown apartment complex in Baldwin Village, Los Angeles, under their strict landlord, Uche. When the first of the month arrives, their landlord demands their rent money of $1,500, stating that they will be evicted unless they pay by 6 PM, even though both Dreux and Alyssa thought it was already paid.

The women deduce that Keshawn must have taken the money and run away with it after they cannot find him. They track him down to the home of Berniece, a woman he has been cheating with. A confrontation ensues, in which Keshawn admits to using the money to invest in his T-shirt company, and Berniece gets knocked down by a truck door, vowing revenge.

Dreux and Alyssa, now penniless, apply for a payday loan but get rejected due to low credit scores. At a blood donation center, Dreux attempts to give as much blood as she possibly can to make the most money, but when Alyssa discovers this, she gets into an altercation with the inexperienced nurse, during which they lose all the blood donated. Defeated, they go to a nearby fast-food restaurant, where they run into Maniac, a man Dreux was previously flirting with. After eating, Alyssa leaves the two to themselves, with an idea for how to obtain the money.

Shortly afterwards, Dreux and Maniac are called to rescue Alyssa, who is on a utility pole trying to take the pair of Air Jordans that had been left on there. After successfully retrieving them, she gets electrocuted by the wires. They sell the Jordans for $1,500, and Dreux arrives at her job interview for the position of franchise manager on time.

Meanwhile, Berniece and Keshawn locate Alyssa waiting for Dreux, by using a photo that Alyssa had sent to Keshawn. Although Dreux's interview impresses her prospective employers, the ensuing fight between the three women—during which Berniece beats both of them up and steals the $1,500—leaves her prospective employers with a negative impression, and they become skeptical about hiring her. While Alyssa and Dreux argue about their predicament, they receive a call from ruthless gangster King Lolo—the man to whom the Jordans belonged—who is angry with them for selling his shoes and threatens to kill them unless they pay him $5,000 by 10 PM.

Returning to their complex, the women discover that their landlord has evicted them and thrown all their belongings to the curb. They run into perky new neighbor Bethany, who offers to buy one of Alyssa's paintings. After seeing her large following on social media, they organize and advertise an impromptu art gallery that evening at the apartment complex to raise money to give to King Lolo, which proves successful. They earn enough money to pay him back, and Dreux's interviewer is one of the attendees, telling her that she is impressed by the event and to expect a call offer for the job.

King Lolo arrives and Alyssa flees, telling Dreux to stall him because she has a plan to avoid paying him their hard-earned money. After shots are fired, the women divert his attention and hide in their empty old apartment, only to discover Keshawn there, who has lit candles in an effort to win Alyssa back. King Lolo arrives, and as he prepares to kill the trio, he slams the door behind him, which causes a piece of the ceiling to fall on his head and knock him out. The candles are knocked over as well, lighting the apartment on fire. The women, Keshawn, and an unconscious King Lolo end up trapped in a room filling with smoke, and Alyssa and Dreux reconcile. Firefighters arrive and break through the doors to rescue them, one of whom is revealed to be Maniac. As Maniac and Dreux talk about starting a relationship, King Lolo gets arrested for not paying back his delinquent loans thanks to Alyssa tipping off the loan bank. Meanwhile, Uche is arrested for not having his complex being safe from fires. Alyssa finally cuts ties with Keshawn, and the women rekindle their friendship.

Dreux is later shown to be a successful franchise manager and Alyssa becomes a renowned painter. The two live together in their newly refurbished apartment.

== Cast ==
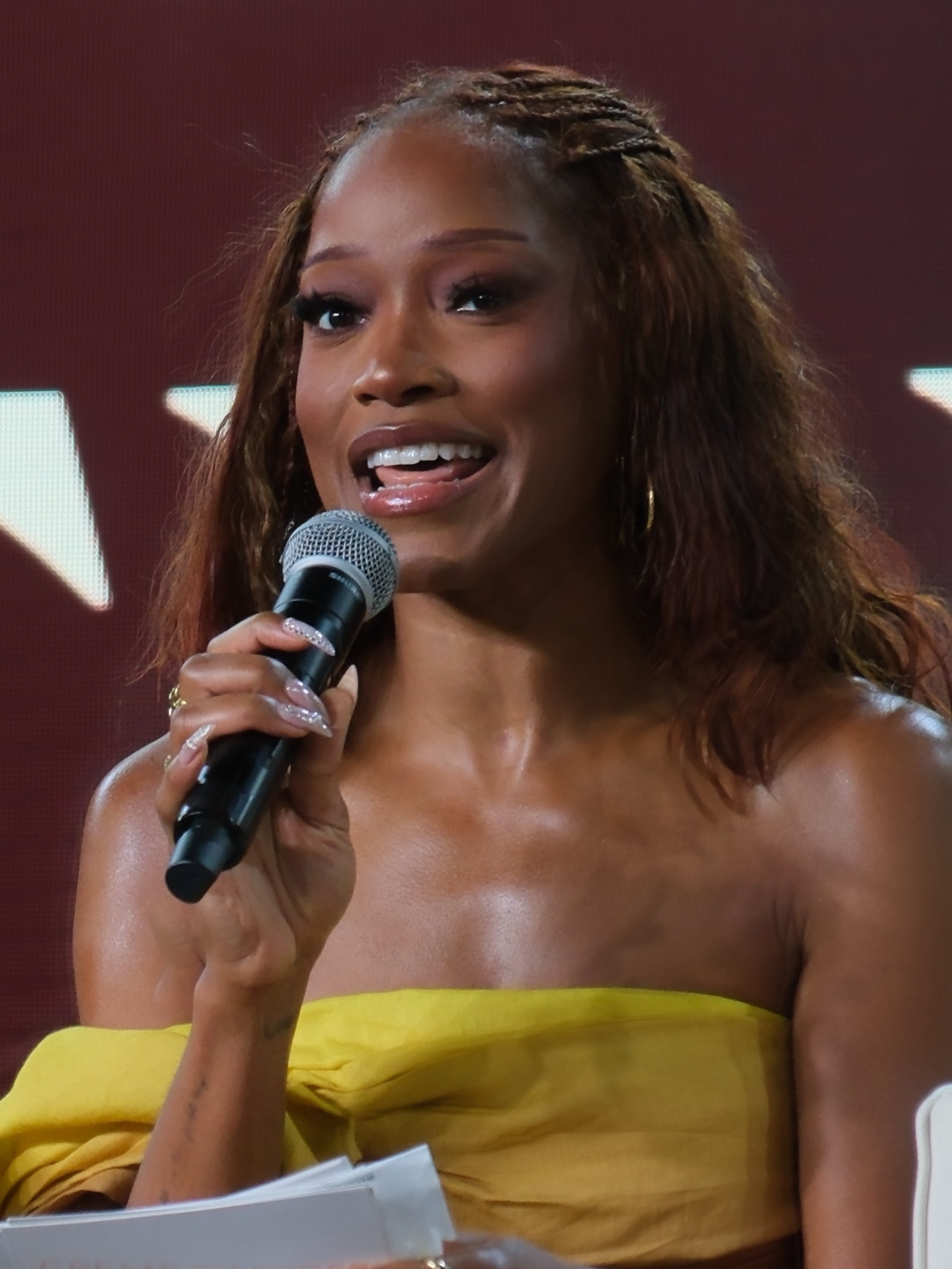
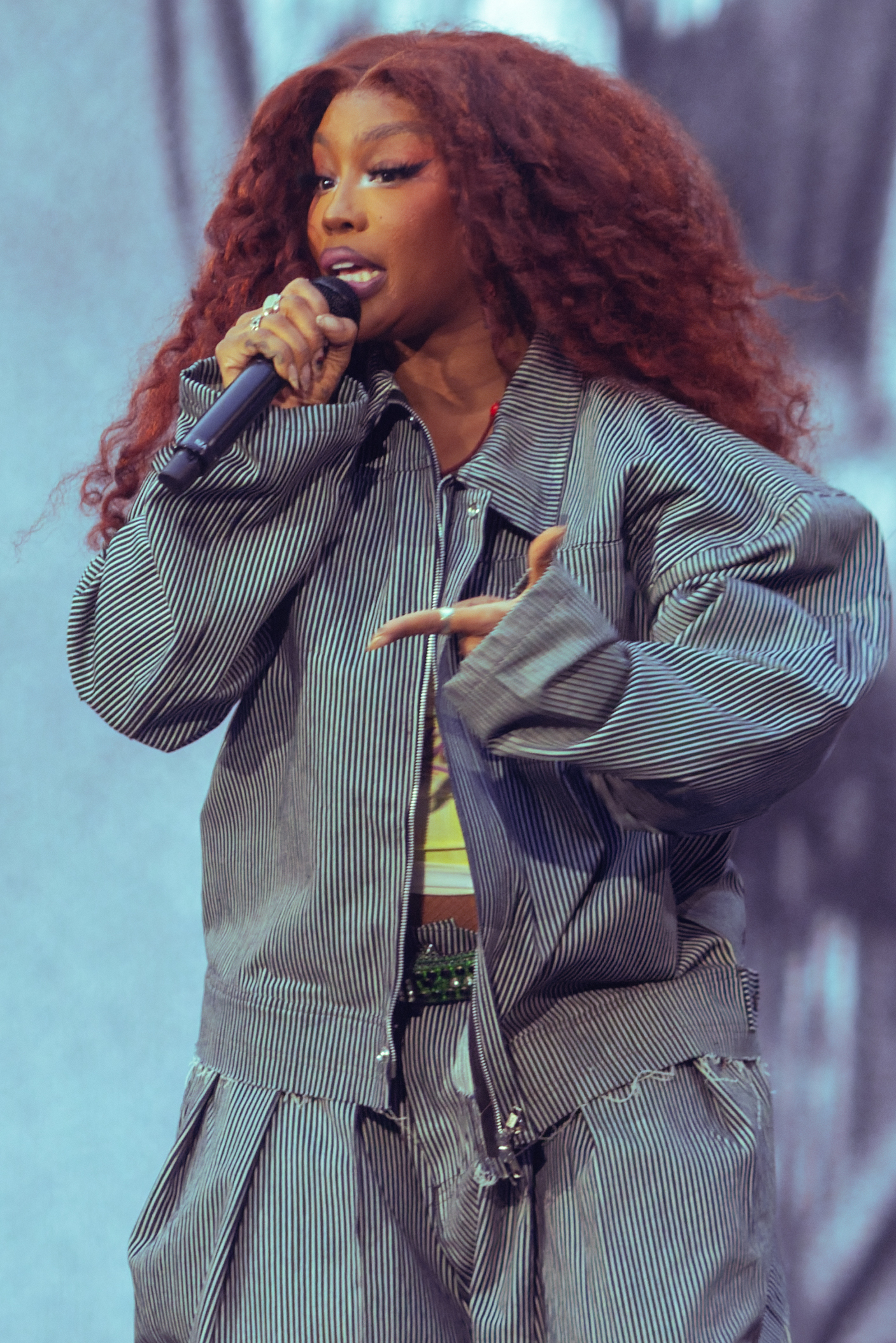
Co-stars Keke Palmer and SZA in 2025; One of Them Days marks the latter's film debut.
- Keke Palmer as Dreux
- SZA as Alyssa
- Vanessa Bell Calloway as Mama Ruth
- Lil Rel Howery as the buyer
- Katt Williams as Lucky
- Maude Apatow as Bethany
- Patrick Cage as Maniac
- Gabrielle Dennis as Shayla
- Janelle James as Ruby
- Amin Joseph as King Lolo
- Keyla Monterroso Mejia as Kathy
- Joshua Neal as Keshawn
- Dewayne Perkins as Jameel
- Aziza Scott as Berniece
- Rizi Timane as Uche
- DomiNque Perry as Shameeka
- Dustin Ybarra as Joseph
- Ray Santiago as Fabian

== Production ==
In April 2024, it was announced that Keke Palmer and SZA had been cast in main roles. In July that same year, it was announced that several other actors, including Lil Rel Howery and Maude Apatow, had also been cast in the film. In August that same year, it was announced that Perkins, Joseph, Dennis and Perry had been cast in the film. Principal photography took place during July 2024 in Los Angeles and lasted for roughly 22 days. The film cost $14 million to produce.

== Release ==
One of Them Days was released in the United States on January 17, 2025, by Sony Pictures Releasing. It was originally set for January 24. The film's Los Angeles premiere on January 13 was cancelled due to the Palisades Fire. The film was released on digital platforms on February 11, 2025, followed by a Blu-ray and DVD release on April 1. It began streaming on Netflix on March 31, 2025.

== Reception ==
=== Box office ===
In the United States and Canada, One of Them Days was released alongside Wolf Man and was projected to gross $8–13 million from 2,402 theaters in its opening four-day MLK weekend. Variety said the wildfires in Los Angeles would not affect its box office performance.

The first theatrical R-rated female Black comedy since Girls Trip (2017), the film made $4.5 million on its first day (including an estimated $1.3 million from Thursday night previews). It debuted to $11.8 million in its opening weekend (and a total of $14 million over the four-day frame), finishing second behind holdover Mufasa: The Lion King (in its fifth weekend) and upsetting Wolf Man.

Deadline Hollywood suggested that the opening could have been higher given the film's positive reception from critics and audiences, blaming Sony's marketing as the film had made 116.6 million impressions across social media platforms, while Girls Trip made 71 million impressions but opened to $31.2 million in 2017. One of Them Days grossed $8 million in its second weekend, $5.9 million in its third, and $2.9 million in its fourth. It dropped out of the box office top ten in its eighth weekend.

=== Critical response ===
On the review aggregator website Rotten Tomatoes, 94% of 118 critics' reviews are positive, with an average rating of 6.9/10. The website's consensus reads: "Dishing out enough laughter and chemistry to spare through Keke Palmer and SZA, One of Them Days makes the buddy-comedy genre feel like magic once again." Metacritic, which uses a weighted average, assigned the film a score of 73 out of 100, based on 28 critics, indicating "generally favorable" reviews. Audiences polled by CinemaScore gave the film an average grade of "A–" on an A+ to F scale, while those surveyed by PostTrak gave it an 84% overall positive score, with 63% saying they would "definitely recommend" it.

=== Viewership ===
According to data from Showlabs, One of Them Days ranked first on Netflix in the United States during the week of 31 March–6 April 2025.

=== Accolades ===
Award / Film Festival	Date of ceremony	Category	Recipient(s)	Result	Ref.
Black Reel Awards	February 16, 2026	Outstanding Film	Issa Rae, Deniese Davis, Sara Rastogi, James Lopez, Poppy Hank	Nominated	
Black Reel Awards	February 16, 2026	Outstanding Lead Performance	Keke Palmer	Nominated	
Black Reel Awards	February 16, 2026	Outstanding Breakthrough Performance	Sza	Nominated	
Black Reel Awards	February 16, 2026	Outstanding Ensemble	Nicole Abellera, Jeanne McCarthy	Nominated	
Black Reel Awards	February 16, 2026	Outstanding Screenplay	Syreeta Singleton	Nominated	
Black Reel Awards	February 16, 2026	Outstanding First Screenplay	Syreeta Singleton	Won	
Black Reel Awards	February 16, 2026	Outstanding Hairstyling & Makeup	Vonda K. Morris, Nikki Wright	Nominated	
Black Reel Awards	February 16, 2026	Outstanding Soundtrack	One of Them Days (Soundtrack)	Nominated	
Film Independent Spirit Awards	February 15, 2026	Best Lead Performance	Keke Palmer	Nominated	
Film Independent Spirit Awards	February 15, 2026	Best Breakthrough Performance	Sza	Nominated	
Film Independent Spirit Awards	February 15, 2026	Best First Feature	Lawrence Lamont, Deniese Davis, Poppy Hanks, James Lopez, Issa Rae, Sara Rastogi	Nominated	
Film Independent Spirit Awards	February 15, 2026	Best First Screenplay	Syreeta Singleton	Nominated	
NAACP Image Awards	February 28, 2026	Outstanding Motion Picture	One of Them Days	Nominated	
NAACP Image Awards	February 28, 2026	Outstanding Directing in a Motion Picture	Lawrence Lamont	Nominated	
NAACP Image Awards	February 28, 2026	Outstanding Actress in a Motion Picture	Keke Palmer	Nominated	
NAACP Image Awards	February 28, 2026	Outstanding Supporting Actress in a Motion Picture	Janelle James	Nominated	
NAACP Image Awards	February 28, 2026	Outstanding Ensemble Cast in a Motion Picture	Keke Palmer, SZA, Vanessa Bell Calloway, Lil Rel Howery, Katt Williams	Nominated	
NAACP Image Awards	February 28, 2026	Outstanding Writing in a Motion Picture	Syreeta Singleton	Nominated	
NAACP Image Awards	February 28, 2026	Outstanding Original Score for TV/Film	One of Them Days (Original Motion Picture Soundtrack)	Nominated	

== Future ==
In June 2025, a sequel was announced to be in early development, with Keke Palmer and SZA expected to reprise their roles, alongside the return of the original production team.
