= Rap Shit =

American comedy television series

- Genre: Comedy
- Created by: Issa Rae
- Starring: Aida Osman; KaMillion; Jonica Booth; Devon Terrell; RJ Cyler; Daniel Augustin
- Music by: Devonté Hynes
- Country of origin: United States
- Original language: English
- No. of seasons: 2
- No. of episodes: 16

Production
- Executive producers: Issa Rae; Syreeta Singleton; Montrel McKay; Deniese Davis; Dave Becky; Jonathan Barry
- Producers: Alex Motlagh; Fran Richter; Lou Fusaro; Sarah Potts
- Cinematography: Lucas Gath; Christine Ng
- Editors: Josie Azzam; Lynarion Hubbard; Antonia DeBarros; E.J. Barrois; Dezi L. Sullivan Jr.
- Running time: 31–32 minutes
- Production companies: Hoorae; District 8 Productions; 3 Arts Entertainment

Original release
- Network: HBO Max
- Release: July 21 – September 1, 2022
- Network: Max
- Release: November 9 – December 21, 2023

Rap Shit (stylized as Rap Sh!t) is an American comedy television series created by Issa Rae for HBO Max. The show is produced by Hoorae Productions and 3 Arts Entertainment and centers on two Miami-based rappers (portrayed by Aida Osman and KaMillion) who try to find success in the music industry. The series debuted at the American Black Film Festival on June 18, 2022, and was released on July 21, 2022.

It was renewed for a second season in September 2022, which premiered on November 9, 2023. The season was originally set to debut in August 2023, but was delayed due to the 2023 SAG-AFTRA strike. In January 2024, the series was canceled after two seasons.

== Plot ==
The show follows Mia Knight and Shawna Clark, two estranged high school friends from Miami who come back together to form a rap group.

== Cast and characters ==
=== Main ===
- Aida Osman as Shawna Clark, a struggling rapper who works at a hotel.
- KaMillion as Mia Knight, a single mother and rapper working multiple jobs to support herself and her 4-year-old daughter, Melissa.
- Jonica Booth as Chastity Killens, a party promoter who goes by "The Duke of Miami" or simply "Duke." She also manages a group of sex workers.
- Devon Terrell as Cliff Lewis (season 1), Shawna's long-distance boyfriend who is a law student in New York.
- RJ Cyler as Lamont Diggs, an aspiring producer with a sharp ear for talent and the father of Mia's daughter.
- Daniel Augustin as Maurice Antoine (season 2; recurring, season 1), Shawna's friend and co-worker.

=== Recurring ===
- Jaboukie Young-White as Francois Boom, a producer and Shawna's former schoolmate
- Amandla Jahava as Jill, Shawna's college friend and an employee at Spotify (season 1)
- Brittney Jefferson as Alesia, Mia's friend from high school
- DomiNque Perry as Nelly, a single mom and high school friend of Mia's
- Ashlei Sharpe Chestnut as Fatima, Cliff's law school classmate and close friend (season 1)
- Bobbi Baker as Robyn, Mia's mom
- Kat Cunning as Reina Reign, Francois Boom's protégée
- Jacob Romero Gibson as Lord AK, a successful rapper (season 2)
- Kyle Bary as Courtney Taylor, an up-and-coming rapper and the opening act for Lord AK's tour (season 2)
- Brittany S. Hall as Alex, a Red Bull executive and Chastity's love interest (season 2)

=== Guest ===
- Guapdad 4000, Timbaland, Brent Faiyaz, Tobe Nwigwe, Benjamin Crump, Maliibu Miitch appear as themselves (season 1)
- Pardison Fontaine as himself (season 2). Guapdad appeared once again in season 2.

== Episodes ==
| Season | Episodes | Originally released | | |
| Season | Episodes | First released | Last released | Network |
|---|---|---|---|---|
| 1 | 8 | July 21, 2022 | September 1, 2022 | HBO Max |
| 2 | 8 | November 9, 2023 | December 21, 2023 | Max |

=== Season 1 (2022) ===
| No. overall | No. in season | Title | Directed by | Written by | Original release date |
|---|---|---|---|---|---|
| 1 | 1 | "Something for The City" | Sadé Clacken Joseph | Issa Rae | July 21, 2022 |
When Mia Knight (KaMillion) suddenly needs someone to watch her daughter, she reaches out to Shawna (Aida Osman), a friend she hasn't talked to since high school. Shawna, a hotel clerk, agrees to babysit while Mia goes to work as a make-up artist for a bridal party. Shawna is frustrated with her day job and the lack of attention she gets when she posts her conscious rap videos as The Vision. She's also nervous about the relationship between her long-distance boyfriend Cliff (Devon Terrell) and his classmate Fatima (Ashlei Sharpe Chestnut). Mia goes to her next job as a cam-girl on OnlyFans and later confronts Lamont (RJ Cyler), her daughter's father, for failing to provide financially. Shawna invites Mia to go out for drinks. Once together, they decide to form a rap group. They record a video of Shawna freestyling a song with the hook "seduce and scheme." The video goes viral overnight.
| 2 | 2 | "Something for The Girls" | Sadé Clacken Joseph | Rosa Handelman | July 21, 2022 |
At her third job, Mia sees Lamont showing off a new watch on his Instagram. Shawna asks her friend Jill (Amandla Jahava) if she can share the "Seduce and Scheme" video with producers at Spotify. Shawna and Mia get together to record more music, but Mia is frustrated that Shawna only wants to rap about social issues. Shawna argues that making music about sex and partying is playing into patriarchy and Mia contends that women shouldn't limit what they rap about to avoid criticism. Cliff's roommates see the "Seduce and Scheme" video and recognize Mia from her OnlyFans profile. Cliff tells Shawna she should stay away from Mia and denies that Fatima has a crush on him. Lamont surprises Mia by sending her several thousand dollars. Mia and Shawna successfully record a full-length version of "Seduce and Scheme." Shawna and Cliff reconcile.
| 3 | 3 | "Something for The Hood" | Christian Nolan Jones | Syreeta Singleton | July 28, 2022 |
Chastity (Jonica Booth) is short on cash after some of her sex workers are robbed and she isn’t paid for party promoting for Guapdad 4000. Lamont’s car is repossessed while he’s watching Melissa, so he makes moves to get cash. He sells some jewelry and attempts to get back pay from some artists whose music he produced, to no avail. Mia pays Lamont to produce "Seduce and Scheme," taking the track to a new level. Maurice (Daniel Augustin) uses one of the credit cards Shawna stole from a hotel guest to buy high-end merchandise that will be resold. Chastity asks Mia if she can manage the group.
| 4 | 4 | "Something for The Clubs" | Lawrence Lamont | Nina Gloster | August 4, 2022 |
Mia video chats with her father, a prison inmate and rapper named E-Block, about her burgeoning rap career. Chastity takes Shawna, Mia, Nelly, and Alesia to a party to meet a well-connected music producer, Sam Sneak. However, they get stuck in the heat waiting in line and he’s left by the time they get in. Chastity next takes them to a nightclub where Sam happens to be, but gets sidetracked to pursue the robber from the last episode. At the nightclub Sam is not interested in entertaining Chastity’s pitch for a demo. She lies to the DJ to get her to play "Seduce and Scheme," and Mia and Shawna are excited to hear their song. Shawna tells Mia she’s going to New York to visit Cliff and they decide to travel together.
| 5 | 5 | "Something for The Weekend" | Kevin Bray | Fran Richter & Chad Sanders | August 11, 2022 |
Spotify executives take a liking to “Seduce and Scheme,” surprising Jill at her corporate meeting. Shawna and Mia are recognized from bystanders as they arrive in New York and Shawna surprises Cliff at his apartment. Mia meets up with one of her long-term OnlyFans clients, but ends the night early. The following morning she is evicted from the high-end hotel where she was staying. At a morning brunch with Cliff’s friends, Cliff is surprised to hear that Shawna didn't tell Mia she was planning to move to New York. Shawna and Mia are invited to a special Spotify party and Jill introduces them to corporate management. Mia gets in a scuffle with another woman, causing friction between her and Shawna. Cliff feels slighted and leaves the party. At his apartment he livestreams an argument with Shawna and disparages “Seduce and Scheme.” Mia and Shawna console each other as they await their flight.
| 6 | 6 | "Something for The Gram" | Amy Aniobi | Aida Osman & Kid Fury | August 18, 2022 |
Mia takes the day off work after reading negative social media responses about her fight at the Spotify party. Shawna refuses to reach out to Cliff and skips work to go to the beach with Maurice and other friends. Cliff texts her angrily after she posts videos of the outing on Instagram. Shawna and Maurice sneak into a swanky penthouse at the hotel and have sex. Mia is feeling depressed and is surprised that Lamont offers her solace. Shawna calls Mia to apologize for not supporting her sooner after the Spotify fight. She also threatens a reaction video vlogger on IG Live for criticizing Mia. Chastity tells Mia she can secure a high-profile gig for the rap group.
| 7 | 7 | "Something for The DJ" | Lawrence Lamont | Chris Sanford & Elize Diop | August 25, 2022 |
Maurice buys several laptops to resell using credit card numbers stolen by Shawna. Lamont invites Mia out on a date but Shawna suggests that he’s only interested because of her budding fame. Francois invites Shawna for drinks and asks her to collaborate with his new white female artist, Reina Reign. Shawna leaves in anger. At their first major gig, a party thrown by James Harden, Chastity’s connect Brian is embarrassed by her fangirl behavior. Deja, one of her sex workers, gets angry when she finds out none of the girls will be paid for working the party. Mia and Shawna’s performance begins strong but is derailed when Shawna delivers an impromptu freestyle. Mia is angry at Shawna and ends up sleeping with Lamont. Maurice is MIA the day of the party.
| 8 | 8 | "Something for The Road" | Jay Ellis | Issa Rae & Syreeta Singleton | September 1, 2022 |
Mia ignores Shawna's attempts to reconcile. She goes out with Alesia and Nelly and they run into Cash, who spilled his drink on her at the James Harden party. The group shares a meal at a diner and Cash gives Mia several thousand dollars in an attempt to woo her. Maurice tells Shawna that he was arrested. Shawna deletes the digital trail of all communications related to the credit card scam. She tells Cliff she misses him and later meets Francois and asks him to work together. Chastity arranges a meeting with Mia and Shawna and tells them she can either manage them or hurt the group's prospects. Shawna apologizes to Mia and promises she'll check her ego. Mia tells Lamont that she isn't interested in dating him. Francois sets up the duo to be the opening act on Reina Reign's tour. The police come to the hotel to arrest Shawna.

=== Season 2 (2023) ===
| No. overall | No. in season | Title | Directed by | Written by | Original release date |
|---|---|---|---|---|---|
| 9 | 1 | "Yield" | Ava Berkofsky | Syreeta Singleton | November 9, 2023 |
Shawna informs her family she is a suspect in a credit card fraud case, much to her mother's ire. While shopping with Alesia and Nelly, Mia struggles to find a babysitter for Melissa before she and Shawna go on tour. At a cookout, Deja asks Chastity to take over the pimping while she is off on tour with Mia and Shawna. Mia attempts to reconcile with Lamont so he can watch Melissa. Francois informs the girls that despite the tour selling out, they are not getting paid immediately due to a lack of interest outside of Miami. Shawna convinces Chastity and Mia to agree to the offer. Francois and Shawna confide in each other at the pool. At Mia's going-away party, Melissa has a tantrum, and Robyn becomes jealous over not being asked to take care of her granddaughter. Shawna and Maurice celebrate her success and have sex. Mia has second thoughts about leaving, but Lamont comforts her. Shawna sees Maurice talking to Stanley outside, who has concerns over her snitching to the police.
| 10 | 2 | "Heavy Traffic" | Ava Berkofsky | Nina Gloster | November 9, 2023 |
At their first stop in Portland, Oregon, Shawna is dissatisfied over their group not being included in the marquee, but Chastity reassures them. The group disapproves of their maid costumes, while Reina gets to wear Gucci. Chastity attempts to talk to Francois, who shuts her down. After their show, Shawna complains to Mia about their performance. Much to his embarrassment, Melissa has a tantrum at Lamont's studio session. In the green room, the girls attempt to network with Lord AK's entourage: Courtney Luke, and Gat. Chastity takes drugs with Gat, who humiliates Shawna during a round of party trivia, prompting her to storm out. Mia tells Shawna and Chastity that Cash is flying her out that night and she will meet them at the next stop.
| 11 | 3 | "Rough Road" | Lawrence Lamont | Aziza Barnes & Akilah Green | November 16, 2023 |
Nelly and Alesia encourage Mia to entice Cash. When Mia meets up with Cash, they make love and go out to a club the next day, where they grow closer. When she returns to the airport, she accidentally texts Cash a selfie of them in bed intended for her friends. On the tour bus, Shawna is miserable, and Chastity attempts to contact Deja. At a rest stop, Shawna steals snacks while Chastity watches an interview with Reina and Francois. When the tour bus breaks down on them, they decide to walk to their next destination and end up lost, almost getting shot by a deranged female homeowner. Chastity confides in Shawna her life story and how she ended up in her uncle's pimping operation, and Shawna confesses her fraud crime. At their aunt's birthday party, Stanley and Maurice argue about the risk of Shawna being a snitch. Maurice later overhears Stanley planning to get rid of him. When Shawna calls Maurice, he records their conversation.
| 12 | 4 | "Detour" | Lawrence Lamont | Dave Helem | November 23, 2023 |
In Oakland, California, Mia, Shawna, and Chastity are disgusted by their motel room and are upset when Reina doesn't mention them in an interview. Chastity attempts to talk to Francois about their rooms, but he tells them there's not enough in the budget. The group pulls up to a local show where Reina is due to perform. Mia is anxious that Cash hasn't responded to her all day. She calls Lamont, inadvertently inviting him to their next stop in L.A. Dissatisfied with the audience, the girls refuse to perform with Reina. Chastity leaves with an old friend, Guapdad, to make some fast money to upgrade their rooms. Despite a shaky start, Reina delivers a successful performance. Mia and Shawna decide to freestyle onstage and are positively received by the crowd. Lord AK arrives with his entourage. Impressed by their freestyle, he invites the girls to his studio. Guapdad detours to a fast-food restaurant, where they run into an old friend. Chastity ditches them and steals jewelry from their car. Shawna and Lord AK bond at the studio, but leaves when Gat humiliates her. Mia and Courtney return to his hotel room and talk all night. In the morning, she discovers that Cash posted her nude to his story.
| 13 | 5 | "Dead End" | Amy Aniobi | Christopher Sanford | November 30, 2023 |
At lunch with Francois in Los Angeles, he expresses his frustration at Mia and Shawna for upsetting Reina and asks them to apologize. Chastity books the girls a lavish hotel room, and Mia receives a gifted dress from Cash. Shawna talks to a disdainful Maurice, who secretly collaborates with Stanley. Mia lies to Lamont about L.A., convincing him not to come. At the Billboard party, Mia and Shawna apologize to Reina, but Shawna calls her out on her cultural appropriation. Francois intimidates Chastity, telling her that all of the girls' opportunities came from him. Later, Chastity unsuccessfully attempts to network industry figures but bonds with Alex, an A&R executive. Mia and Courtney Luke flirt by the pool. Francois introduces the girls to Tunji Balogun, who invites them to his office after the tour. While Chastity goes for drinks, Francois secretly hints at dropping her as a manager. Cash and Lord AK arrive, and the girls split off: Mia with Cash and Shawna with AK. Shawna and AK sneak off, but he dejectedly leaves when she attempts to give him a handjob. Mia ditches Cash for Courtney, and they have sex in a bathroom but are later caught by Cash. The party quickly ends in a panic when Gat and Shawna horrifically discover AK has immolated himself on the balcony.
| 14 | 6 | "U-Turn" | Amy Aniobi | Kid Fury | December 7, 2023 |
With the tour canceled, Mia, Shawna, and Chastity are back in Miami, their careers in limbo. Chastity is furious with Deja's mishandling of the prostitutes and that her competitor, Bugs, has pushed the girls off of their block. Francois texts Shawna that they have yet to hear from Def Jam despite the meeting going well at the party. Shawna laments that she could have stopped AK, but Mia reassures her. At a get-together with Mia's friends, Shawna is triggered by Alesia's insensitive jokes and has a panic attack. She later leaves and attempts to reconcile with Maurice. Chastity pulls up at Bugs' motel and kicks out all his clientele. The next day, she is lured back to the motel and is jumped by Bugs. In revenge, her uncle pulls up on him and kills him. Maurice and Shawna have dinner but are interrupted by Stanley, who reveals Maurice's recordings.
| 15 | 7 | "No Parking" | Calmatic | Elize Diop | December 14, 2023 |
The girls' careers have reached a standstill. Chastity devises a plan to contact Alex, who is in Miami for an event. Lamont and Tiffany grow closer, and he begins to set boundaries with Mia, who is disgruntled by the change in their dynamic. At the event, Alex introduces Chastity to her boss, Kirk, who is the vice president of A&R. Alex takes Chastity back home for drinks, and they eventually hook up. Suspicious about Lamont, Mia asks Melissa about her father's activities with Tiffany. Francois and Shawna talk over dinner; he reveals he has dropped Reina. He offers to produce an EP for Shawna and Mia while the girls retain creative control. Lamont and Courtney invite Mia to record the hook of their newest song. After Courtney leaves, Lamont and Mia argue about their relationship, and he cuts her off. After extensively ghosting him, Shawna and Maurice meet up at a park where he admits he was planning to snitch on her for a reduced sentence as part of a plea deal or face a 15-month prison term. Shawna reassures him that she will help him figure out what to do.
| 16 | 8 | "Under Construction" | Calmatic | Issa Rae | December 21, 2023 |
Francois and the girls have a successful recording session with Pardison Fontaine. Pardison asks them questions about their personal lives to better understand their artistic vision, which Shawna hesitates to discuss. At a meeting with Alex, she reveals that Red Bull is offering a deal in which they retain their creative control and masters, though they are interested in an EP with Lamont as a producer. At Melissa's birthday party, Mia's card declines when she attempts to pay for the bounce castle and asks Lamont for help. Tiffany's presence at the party disgruntles Mia. During a dance battle, Melissa accidentally hits Tiffany's daughter, Lulu, and Lamont blames Mia for instigating it. Consequently, he declines to work with Mia again. Shawna and Maurice spend time together before he surrenders, and he invites her to his going-away party. Francois calls Shawna and previews their new track but is livid when Shawna informs him of the girls' deal with Red Bull and threatens to scrap the track if they continue with Chastity. Mia and Shawna discuss what to do about the ultimatum. Chastity crashes Alex's meeting with Kirk and convinces him to give the girls a better offer. Upset at being undermined, Alex ends things with Chastity. Shawna goes live and puts Gat on blast for using Lord AK as clout. Her reaction elicits the attention of big-name female rappers and Francois implores her to take advantage of the notoriety. The girls fire Chastity as their manager, choosing to continue with Francois. Having sacrificed so much for the girls, Chastity leaves heartbroken. Maurice prepares to leave for prison and gives Stanley his phone, telling him he never deleted the recordings. Chastity meets with Gat and Reina, and the girls debut their new single "BBW" on TikTok.

== Production ==
=== Development ===
In October 2019, it was announced that Issa Rae would produce Rap Shit for HBO Max, a comedy series about a fledgling South Florida-based rap group, with a tentative premiere date of May 2020. In February 2021, HBO Max ordered the eight-episode half hour series.

Rap Shit is produced by Rae's company, Hoorae Media, and 3 Arts Entertainment. It is her first major project following the end of Insecure, which ran for five seasons. Similar to Insecure, each episode title of the season begins with the same phrase.

Rae is the show's head writer and executive producer with Montrel McKay and 3A's Dave Becky and Jonathan Barry. Syreeta Singleton, who wrote for Insecure, is also executive producer and serves as showrunner. Yung Miami and JT of rap duo City Girls are also co-executive producers with Kevin "Coach K" Lee and Pierre "P" Thomas (QC Films), and Sara Rastogi (Hoorae). The series is inspired by the story of the City Girls' founding and later success.

Production began in the summer of 2021. In May 2021, it was reported that Sadé Clacken Joseph would direct the pilot. In August 2021, it was reported that Devonté Hynes is set to serve as the series' composer.

In July 2022, the series received $12.6 million in tax credits from the California Film Commission for job creation. Rap Shit was renewed for a second season on September 12, 2022.

The second season was set in California.

On January 18, 2024, the series was canceled after two seasons.

=== Casting ===
In May 2021, it was announced that Aida Osman and KaMillion will star in the lead roles of Mia and Shawna, and Jonica Booth will also star. Osman, an executive story editor for the show, is best known as a co-host on the Crooked Media podcast Keep It. KaMillion is a rapper-singer who has appeared on Love & Hip Hop: Miami, and Booth is known for having appeared on Bad Girls Club.

In July 2021, Devon Terrell joined the main cast. On August 6, 2021, Daniel Augustin, Ashlei Sharpe Chestnut, Amandla Jahava, and Jaboukie Young-White joined the cast in recurring roles. On August 16, 2021, RJ Cyler joined the main cast. In January 2022, Brittney Jefferson and DomiNque Perry were announced as recurring cast members. Season 2 included the addition of recurring actors Jacob Romero and Kyle Bary.

=== Filming ===
Principal photography for the series began on August 8, 2021, and was scheduled to conclude on November 19, 2021, in Miami, Florida. Filming for season 2 began on February 17, 2023.

== Release ==
The series debuted at American Black Film Festival on June 18, 2022. The first season was released on HBO Max on July 21, 2022. The second season premiered on November 9, 2023, with two episodes. The season was originally set to debut on August 10, 2023, but was delayed due to the 2023 SAG-AFTRA strike.

== Critical reception ==
For the first season, review aggregator website Rotten Tomatoes reported a 100% approval rating with an average rating of 7.4/10, based on 18 critic reviews. The website's critics consensus reads, "Issa Rae's razor-sharp sensibility is fully felt in Rap Sh!t, a raucous chronicle of female camaraderie and youthful ambition." Metacritic, which uses a weighted average, assigned a score of 80 out of 100 based on 13 critics, indicating "generally favorable reviews".

Shanelle Genai praised Rap Shit in a review for The Root: "And while the show moves pretty fast and has a lofty amount of topics it’s trying to cover, all in all, the sophomore show from Issa Rae is already proving to be one of the most fun, must-see TV shows this summer." Similarly, Qunci Legardye of The A.V. Club rated the series a B+ and wrote in the review: "Though Rap Sh!t offers a lot of stimulating conversation starters about the state of the music industry, the rise of social media, and Rae’s choices in building her legacy, it’s primarily a funny-ass show about women trying to change their lives."

The Ringer's Alison Herman praised the use of cinematographic framing to depict various scenes that take place on digital platforms: "Pilot director Sadé Clacken Joseph, who’s helmed music videos and commercials for Common and T.I., sets the tone, toggling freely between Snapchats, Instagram Lives, phone footage, and cam sessions...Rap Sh!t’s use of online platforms isn’t just innovative. It’s key to the story it wants to tell about a world where clout and musical cred are increasingly interrelated.

Shelli Nicole praised the friendship at the core of the series in a review for RogerEbert.com: "“Rap Sh!t” not only centers friendship but it's a new one, one that is being rediscovered. Yes, there is judgment and bickering between the two, but there is also sweetness and care. It feels real as they discover each other's flaws, uncover their needs, and learn about themselves through the eyes of another person."

For the second season, Rotten Tomatoes reported a 100% approval rating with an average rating of 7.9/10, based on 11 critic reviews. The website's critics consensus reads, "More dramatic than before and even more insightful, Rap Sh!t adds a second verse that's just as entertaining as the first." Metacritic, which uses a weighted average, assigned a score of 81 out of 100 based on 6 critics, indicating "universal acclaim".

== Awards and nominations ==
| Year | Award | Category | Nominee(s) | Result | Ref. |
|---|---|---|---|---|---|
| 2022 | Gotham Awards | Breakthrough Series - Shortform | Issa Rae, Syreeta Singleton, Montrel McKay, Deniese Davis, Dave Becky, Jonathan Berry | Nominated | |
| 2023 | Guild of Music Supervisors Awards | Best Song Written and/or Recorded for television | Songwriters: Larry Dwayne Batiste, Isaac Earl Bynum, Khia Chambers, Brittany Dickinson, Aida Goitom, Floyd Nathaniel Hills, Clayton Richardson, Seandrea Sledge, Bill Summers. Kevin Toney, Michael J. Williams; Performers: Shawna & Mia; Music Supervisors: Sarah Bromberg, Stephanie Diaz-Matos, Philippe Pierre (for “Seduce & Scheme”) | Nominated | |
| 2023 | Independent Spirit Awards | Best Lead Performance in a New Scripted Series | KaMillion | Nominated | |
| 2023 | NAACP Image Awards | Outstanding Comedy Series | Rap Shit | Nominated | |
| 2023 | NAACP Image Awards | Outstanding Breakthrough Creative (Television) | Syreeta Singleton | Nominated | |
