= 40 Acres (film) =

2024 film directed by R. T. Thorne

- Theatrical release poster
- Directed by: R. T. Thorne
- Written by: R. T. Thorne; Glenn Taylor
- Produced by: Jennifer Holness
- Starring: Danielle Deadwyler; Kataem O'Connor; Michael Greyeyes; Milcania Diaz-Rojas; Leenah Robinson
- Cinematography: Jeremy Benning
- Edited by: Dev Singh; Sandy Pereira
- Music by: Todor Kobakov
- Production companies: Hungry Eyes Film & Television
- Distributed by: Mongrel Media
- Release dates: September 6, 2024 (TIFF); July 2, 2025 (U.S.)
- Running time: 113 minutes
- Country: Canada
- Languages: English; Cree
- Budget: $8 million
- Box office: $775,204

40 Acres is a 2024 Canadian post-apocalyptic thriller film written and directed by R. T. Thorne. The film stars Danielle Deadwyler as a matriarch of descendants of African-American farmers who settled in 1875 in rural Canada after the American Civil War. Two hundred years later, they are trying to survive in a decimated future.

The film premiered at the Toronto International Film Festival on September 6, 2024, and was theatrically released in Canada on July 4, 2025 by Mongrel Media. It received generally positive reviews from critics, receiving nominations at the Black Reel Awards, NAACP Image Awards and winning three Directors Guild of Canada Awards, including the Impact Award for Thorne.

== Cast ==
- Danielle Deadwyler as Hailey Freeman
- Kataem O'Connor as Emanuel Freeman
- Jaeda LeBlanc as Danis Freeman
- Michael Greyeyes as Galen
- Milcania Diaz-Rojas as Dawn
- Leenah Robinson as Raine

== Production ==
The first news of project developing by R. T. Thorne was released during the 2018 Toronto International Film Festival. On October 17, 2023, it was reported that Danielle Deadwyler would star in the independent post-apocalyptic film directed and written by R. T. Thorne. Also cast Kataem O'Connor, Michael Greyeyes, Milcania Diaz-Rojas and Leenah Robinson. The film was produced by Jennifer Holness with Hungry Eyes Film & Television.

Principal photography began in September, 2023 in Sudbury, Ontario, and wrapped on October 26.

The film has faced allegations of unpaid invoices to crew, employees, and local vendors in the Sudbury area. As of October 2024, IATSE confirmed that all outstanding money owed to the film's crew had been paid, while producer Jennifer Holness was still working to pay the vendors.

== Release ==
40 Acres had its world premiere at the Toronto International Film Festival (TIFF) on September 6, 2024. It was released in theaters on July 4, 2025.

== Reception ==
On the review aggregator website Rotten Tomatoes, 89% of 95 critics' reviews are positive. The website's consensus reads: "Dystopia is a family affair in 40 Acres, a thoughtful thriller given extra heft by provocative themes and a terrific Danielle Deadwyler." Metacritic, which uses a weighted average, assigned the film a score of 75 out of 100, based on 18 critics, indicating "generally favorable" reviews. John Serba at Decider wrote: "40 Acres is an engrossing, well-crafted gem of a thriller, as smart as it is entertaining." Sarah Gopaul at Digital Journal wrote: "Writer-director R.T. Thorne’s debut feature tackles a variety of subjects, but the Freemans are the heart of the story, whether they’re tending the land or fighting off marauders."

The film was named to the annual Canada's Top Ten list by TIFF for 2024.

It was nominated for Best Direction in a Feature Film at the 2025 Directors Guild of Canada awards.

=== Accolades ===
Award / Film Festival	Date of ceremony	Category	Recipient(s)	Result	Ref.
Black Reel Awards	February 16, 2026	Outstanding Independent Film	40 Acres	Won	
Black Reel Awards	February 16, 2026	Outstanding Lead Performance	Danielle Deadwyler	Nominated	
Black Reel Awards	February 16, 2026	Outstanding Director	R.T. Thorne	Nominated	
Black Reel Awards	February 16, 2026	Outstanding Emerging Director	R.T. Thorne	Won	
Black Reel Awards	February 16, 2026	Outstanding Screenplay	R.T. Thorne	Nominated	
Black Reel Awards	February 16, 2026	Outstanding First Screenplay	R.T. Thorne	Nominated	
Black Reel Awards	February 16, 2026	Outstanding Ensemble	Stephanie Gorin	Nominated	
Black Reel Awards	February 16, 2026	Outstanding Costume Design	Charlene Akuamoah	Nominated	
Black Reel Awards	February 16, 2026	Outstanding Hairstyling & Makeup	Antonio Hines and Chancelle Mulela	Nominated	
Canadian Screen Awards	2026	Best Motion Picture	Jennifer Holness	Nominated	
Canadian Screen Awards	2026	Best Direction	R. T. Thorne	Won	
Canadian Screen Awards	2026	Best Original Screenplay	R. T. Thorne, Glenn Taylor	Won	
Canadian Screen Awards	2026	John Dunning Best First Feature	R. T. Thorne	Won	
Canadian Screen Awards	2026	Best Art Direction/Production Design	Peter Cosco	Won	
Canadian Screen Awards	2026	Best Cinematography	Jeremy Benning	Won	
Canadian Screen Awards	2026	Best Sound Editing	Ed Douglas, Dermain Finlayson	Won	
Canadian Screen Awards	2026	Best Original Score	Todor Kobakov	Won	
Canadian Screen Awards	2026	Best Casting in a Film	Stephanie Gorin	Won	
Canadian Screen Awards	2026	Stunt Coordination	Angelica Lisk-Hann	Won	
Directors Guild of Canada Awards	2025	Best Direction in a Feature Film	R. T. Thorne	Nominated	
Directors Guild of Canada Awards	2025	Impact Award	R. T. Thorne	Won	
Directors Guild of Canada Awards	2025	Best Production Design in a Feature Film	Peter Cosco	Nominated	
Directors Guild of Canada Awards	2025	Best Picture Editing in a Feature Film	Dev Singh and Sandy Pereira	Won	
Directors Guild of Canada Awards	2025	Best Sound Editing in a Feature Film	Ed Douglas and Dermain Finlayson	Won	
Directors Guild of Canada Awards	2025	Best Crew in a Feature Film	40 Acres	Nominated	
NAACP Image Awards	February 28, 2026	Outstanding International Motion Picture	40 Acres	Nominated	
NAACP Image Awards	February 28, 2026	Outstanding Independent Motion Picture	40 Acres	Nominated	
NAACP Image Awards	February 28, 2026	Outstanding Directing in a Motion Picture	R. T. Thorne	Nominated	
NAACP Image Awards	February 28, 2026	Outstanding Breakthrough Creative (Motion Picture)	R. T. Thorne	Nominated	
NAACP Image Awards	February 28, 2026	Outstanding Actress in a Motion Picture	Danielle Deadwyler	Nominated	
