= Magazine Dreams =

2023 film by Elijah Bynum

- Theatrical release poster
- Directed by: Elijah Bynum
- Written by: Elijah Bynum
- Produced by: Jennifer Fox; Dan Gilroy; Jeffrey Soros; Simon Horsman; Luke Rogers
- Starring: Jonathan Majors; Haley Bennett; Taylour Paige; Harrison Page; Harriet Sansom Harris; Mike O'Hearn
- Cinematography: Adam Arkapaw
- Edited by: Jon Otazua
- Music by: Jason Hill
- Production companies: Los Angeles Media Fund; JF Productions
- Distributed by: Briarcliff Entertainment
- Release dates: January 20, 2023 (Sundance); March 21, 2025 (United States)
- Running time: 123 minutes
- Country: United States
- Language: English
- Box office: $1.5 million

Magazine Dreams is a 2023 American psychological drama film written and directed by Elijah Bynum. The plot features social outcast bodybuilder Killian Maddox, who has body dysmorphic disorder, and whose dream of becoming a bodybuilder consumes his entire life; his depression and aggressive tendencies consume him, and his obsession with becoming a Mr. Olympia champion brings him to a complete mental breakdown. The film stars Jonathan Majors, Haley Bennett, Taylour Paige, Harrison Page, Harriet Sansom Harris, and Mike O'Hearn.

The film had its world premiere at the Sundance Film Festival on January 20, 2023. Originally slated to be released theatrically on December 8, 2023, by Searchlight Pictures, the film was removed from its release schedule and dropped by the distributor, in response to both the 2023 SAG-AFTRA strike and controversies surrounding Majors. Briarcliff Entertainment later acquired domestic distribution rights to it, and the film was finally released on March 21, 2025 to positive critical reception.

== Plot ==
Killian Maddox is a mentally ill grocery store worker obsessed with bodybuilding. He lives with his grandfather ("Paw-Paw") as a result of his father committing murder–suicide of himself and Killian's mother. His dream to be the best in bodybuilding aids in creating negative behaviors, with the steroids he takes to support his physique, leading to physical ailments. Killian has frequent, recurring, emotional outbursts and appears unable to express his true emotions. His frustration sexually manifests through watching pornographic videos but not masturbating.

As he prepares for a show, he attempts to ask out his love interest, Jessie, at the grocery store where he works. He asks her out while he is shopping, only to walk out awkwardly. Killian talks about his bodybuilding goals and admiration for fitness champion, Brad Vanderhorn, in written letters. Killian also includes his phone number, hoping Brad would call. Killian threatens a local painter's shop as the owner refuses to repaint his grandfather's house due to his Paw-Paw's claims of thin paint needing another coat, eventually destroying the shop's windows and inventory in a fit of anger. Killian attempts to flee the scene, but he crashes his car and is knocked out. In the hospital after the accident, Killian is informed by a doctor that he has tumors on his liver which require immediate surgical removal. Killian vehemently refuses the surgery, telling the doctor "bodybuilders can't have scars".

Killian takes Jessie out to dinner, where he dumps about the deaths of his parents before devolving into an intense monologue expressing his bodybuilding dreams. Jessie leaves him at the restaurant. He is distraught as he focuses on his next fitness show. Immediately before the next show, the local painter owner's nephew and friends assault him, breaking his arm in the process and leaving him bloody and disfigured. Despite the beating, he drives to the show. He steps on stage and begins to pose in an injured condition, only to pass out. Killian watches a viral internet video of his embarrassing presentation on stage and, in a fit of anger, destroys his tape-collection of bodybuilding videos and bodybuilding posters in his room.

Following the disaster of a show, Killian hides his true dark and violent feelings and real-life happenings from his counselor (informing his counselor that he has had his picture taken for a magazine and that his relationship with Jessie has actually worked out). He eventually picks up Pink Coat with the intent to have sex, only to be unable to continue after she demands no kissing. Killian's spiral continues: he is fired from his job, he encounters the owner's nephew again, with his family, in a diner, causing a threatening scene. The police are called on Killian at the restaurant, and outside he damages a woman's vehicle and the police use excessive force rather than de-esclating; they beat him with sticks and a cop holds him down while another pepper sprays him several times and he is arrested. Killian then begins purchasing and assembling guns.

One day, Brad responds to Killian's messages and invites him to his next photo shoot. Upon their first interaction, Brad obliges Killian to feel his abs, and the pair spends the night together in a sequence marked with ambiguity regarding consent. Brad ignores Killian for a call from his wife, and Killian leaves wordlessly.

Killian continues fantasizing about murder. He breaks into the home of a judge who provided a criticism that he returns to several times over at earlier points in the film, forcing him (at gunpoint) to strip and pose.

Killian then attends Brad's posing show armed with a gun and has a vivid fantasy about shooting and killing Brad on stage during a disorienting montage sequence featuring previous moments from Killian's life, including interactions with his parents as a child. Killian ultimately leaves without shooting. Upon returning home, he breaks down in his Paw-Paw's arms, disassembles his gun, throws it away near a set of train tracks, dumps his steroids into a toilet, and commences flexing in his garage, reiterating his still-existing bodybuilding dreams in voiceover narration.

== Cast ==
- Jonathan Majors as Killian Maddox, an aspiring bodybuilder who struggles to find human connection
- Haley Bennett as Jessie, a grocery store worker and Killian's love-interest
- Taylour Paige as Pink Coat, a sex worker
- Mike O'Hearn as Brad Vanderhorn, a professional bodybuilder and Killian's idol
- Harrison Page as William Lattimore, Killian's grandfather
- Harriet Sansom Harris as Patricia Waldron, Killian's counselor
- Bradley Stryker as Ken Donaghue, a roofing and plumbing worker who assaults Killian
- Dan Donahue as Dr. Prescott, Killian's doctor
- Craig Cackowski as a bodybuilding contest judge who placed Killian poorly
- David Maurice Johnson as the Head Judge of the regional bodybuilding competition

== Production ==
In October 2021, Jonathan Majors joined the cast of the film, with Elijah Bynum directing from a screenplay he wrote, with Majors also serving as an executive producer, and Jennifer Fox and Dan Gilroy serving as producers. In July 2022, Haley Bennett, Taylour Paige and Mike O'Hearn joined the cast of the film.

To prepare for his role, Majors ate 6,100 calories a day for four months and trained for six hours every day to obtain and maintain the extreme muscular physique of his role.

== Release ==
Magazine Dreams had its world premiere at the Sundance Film Festival on January 20, 2023. For the premiere, the production team declined to provide an open captioned print of the film, and the alternate seat-side captioning device provided to juror Marlee Matlin malfunctioned, thus the jurors collectively walked out of the initial screening in support of Matlin's inability to watch it. According to a statement from Sundance, the device was repaired and the jurors were able to screen the film later, as a group. The following month, Searchlight Pictures acquired distribution rights to the film, beating out bidders including Neon, Sony Pictures Classics and HBO.

The film was originally scheduled to be released theatrically on December 8, 2023, but in October 2023, Searchlight's parent, Walt Disney Studios, removed the film from its release schedule in response to both the 2023 SAG-AFTRA strike and assault allegations against Majors, with Poor Things taking its original release date. Following Majors' conviction for assault and harassment in December of that year, The Hollywood Reporter said it was "unlikely" that Searchlight would still release the film, either theatrically or direct-to-streaming.

In January 2024, it was reported that Searchlight had quietly returned the film rights to the filmmakers, so they could shop it to other distributors. In October 2024, Briarcliff Entertainment acquired domestic distribution rights to the film. The film was released in the United States on March 21, 2025. It was theatrically released in the United Kingdom by BUFF Studios, the distribution arm of the British Urban Film Festival, on December 5, 2025.

== Reception ==
=== Box office ===
In its opening weekend, the film grossed $701,365 at the box office. This was considered to be a disappointment, as the film's distributor had hoped that it would gross at least $1 million during its opening weekend.

As of May 20, 2025, Magazine Dreams has grossed $1,173,594.

In November 2025, it was announced during AFM that UK distributor BUFF Studios (the production and distribution arm of the British Urban Film Festival) brokered a deal with Aaryan K. Trivedi & Celsius Entertainment to release the film in UK cinemas nationwide from December 5.

=== Critical response ===
On the review aggregator website Rotten Tomatoes, 80% of 142 critics' reviews are positive, with an average rating of 7/10. The website's consensus reads: "Its dramatic form may get a little wobbly during certain reps, but Jonathan Majors' incredibly committed performance makes Magazine Dreams well worth a watch." Metacritic, which uses a weighted average, assigned the film a score of 65 out of 100, based on 34 critics, indicating "generally favorable" reviews.

=== Accolades ===
Award	Date of Ceremony	Category	Nominated work	Result	Ref.
Palm Springs International Film Festival	November 28, 2022	Directors to Watch	Elijah Bynum	Won	
Sundance Film Festival	January 27, 2023	Special Jury Award: Creative Vision	Creative Team of Magazine Dreams	Won	
Sundance Film Festival	January 27, 2023	Grand Jury Prize: Dramatic	Magazine Dreams	Nominated	
America's Rainbow Film Festival	June 29, 2025	Best Picture	Magazine Dreams	Nominated	
America's Rainbow Film Festival	June 29, 2025	Best Ensemble Cast in a Motion Picture	Magazine Dreams	Nominated	
America's Rainbow Film Festival	June 29, 2025	Best Actor in a Motion Picture	Jonathan Majors	Won	
America's Rainbow Film Festival	June 29, 2025	Best Director: Motion Picture	Elijah Bynum	Nominated	
America's Rainbow Film Festival	June 29, 2025	Best Screenplay: Motion Picture	Elijah Bynum	Nominated	
America's Rainbow Film Festival	June 29, 2025	Best Cinematography	Adam Arkapaw	Nominated	
America's Rainbow Film Festival	June 29, 2025	Best Art Direction & Production Design	Miki Mamaril & Freyja Bardell	Nominated	
America's Rainbow Film Festival	June 29, 2025	Best Editing	Jon Otazua	Nominated	
America's Rainbow Film Festival	June 29, 2025	Best Music Score	Jason Hill	Nominated	
America's Rainbow Film Festival	June 29, 2025	Best Sound Design & Sound Editing	Darin Heinis	Won	
National Film Awards UK	July 2, 2025	Best Supporting Actor	Mike O'Hearn	Nominated	
National Film Awards UK	July 2, 2025	Best Supporting Actress	Taylour Paige	Nominated	
National Film Awards UK	July 2, 2025	Best International Film	Magazine Dreams	Nominated	
Septimius Awards	September 4, 2025	Best American Film	Magazine Dreams	Nominated	
Septimius Awards	September 4, 2025	Best Producer	Magazine Dreams	Nominated	
Septimius Awards	September 4, 2025	Best American Actor	Jonathan Majors	Won	
Black Reel Awards	February 16, 2026	Outstanding Lead Performance	Jonathan Majors	Nominated	
Black Reel Awards	February 16, 2026	Outstanding Independent Film	Magazine Dreams	Nominated	
NAACP Image Awards	February 28, 2026	Outstanding Independent Motion Picture	Magazine Dreams	Nominated	
NAACP Image Awards	February 28, 2026	Outstanding Directing in a Motion Picture	Elijah Bynum	Nominated	

=== Themes ===
Killian Maddox's character reflects themes of isolation, masculinity, and obsessive ambition in modern bodybuilding culture.
