= Black Reel Award for Outstanding Lead Performance =

Film award for lead actor at the Black Reel Awards

Black Reel Award for Outstanding Performance
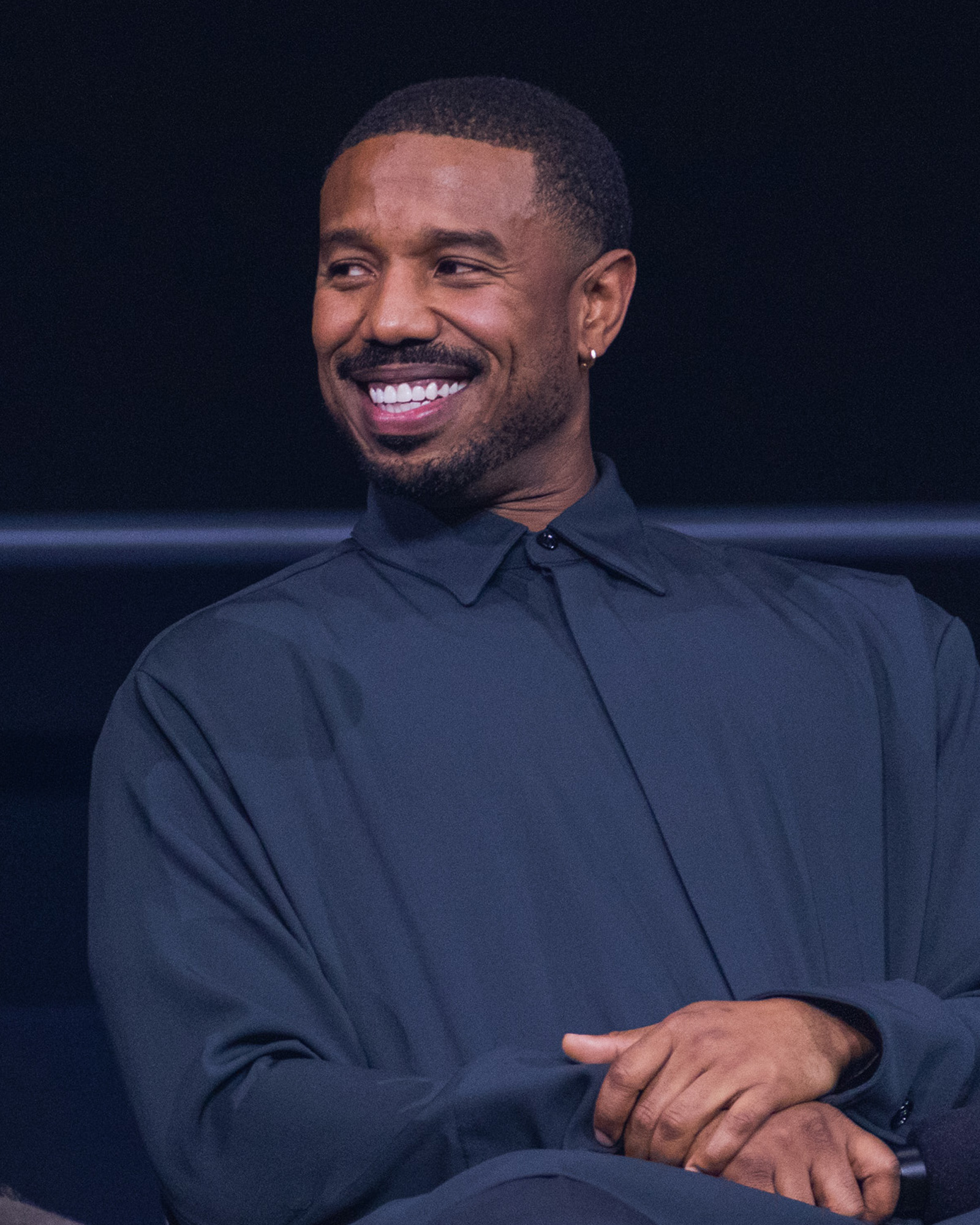
- The 2026 recipient: Michael B. Jordan
- Awarded for: Outstanding Performance
- Country: United States
- Presented by: Black Reel Awards (BRAs)
- First award: 2024
- Most recent winner: Michael B. Jordan; Sinners
- Website: blackreelawards.com

This article lists the winners and nominees for the Black Reel Award for Outstanding Lead Performance. The award recognizes an actor or actress who delivers an outstanding performance in a leading role within the given eligible period.

The award was first presented at the 24th Annual Black Reel Awards as a result of a merger between the Outstanding Actor and Outstanding Actress awards into a single gender-neutral award, with a total of ten nominees being selected. Jeffrey Wright is the inaugural winner for his performance in American Fiction, for which he was also nominated at the Academy Awards.

== Winners and nominees ==
=== 2020s ===
Year	Actor	Role(s)	Film
2024
2024	Jeffrey Wright	Thelonious "Monk" Ellison	American Fiction
2024	Fantasia Barrino	Celie Harris-Johnson	The Color Purple
2024	John Boyega	Fontaine / Tyrone	They Cloned Tyrone
2024	Colman Domingo	Bayard Rustin	Rustin
2024	Aunjanue Ellis-Taylor	Isabel Wilkerson	Origin
2024	Jamie Foxx	Willie E. Gary	The Burial
2024	Kelvin Harrison Jr.	Chevalier de Saint-Georges	Chevalier
2024	Michael B. Jordan	Adonis Creed	Creed III
2024	Teyana Taylor	Inez de la Paz	A Thousand and One
2024	Sophie Wilde	Mia	Talk to Me
2025
2025	Marianne Jean-Baptiste	Pansy Deacon	Hard Truths
2025	Naomi Ackie	Frida	Blink Twice
2025	Ryan Destiny	Claressa Shields	The Fire Inside
2025	Colman Domingo	John "Divine G" Whitfield	Sing Sing
2025	Cynthia Erivo	Elphaba Thropp	Wicked
2025	André Holland	Tarrell	Exhibiting Forgiveness
2025	Regina King	Shirley Chisholm	Shirley
2025	John David Washington	Boy Willie	The Piano Lesson
2025	Kerry Washington	Charity Adams	The Six Triple Eight
2025	Zendaya	Tashi Duncan	Challengers
2026
2026	Michael B. Jordan	Elijah "Smoke" Moore / Elias "Stack" Moore	Sinners
2026	Danielle Deadwyler	Hailey Freeman	40 Acres
2026	Cynthia Erivo	Elphaba Thropp	Wicked: For Good
2026	André Holland	Roger	Love, Brooklyn
2026	Chase Infiniti	Willa Ferguson	One Battle After Another
2026	Dwayne Johnson	Mark Kerr	The Smashing Machine
2026	Jonathan Majors	Killian Maddox	Magazine Dreams
2026	Keke Palmer	Dreux	One of Them Days
2026	Tessa Thompson	Hedda Gabler	Hedda
2026	Denzel Washington	David King	Highest 2 Lowest

== Multiple nominations ==
2 nominations

- Colman Domingo
- Cynthia Erivo
- Michael B. Jordan

== Age superlatives ==
Record	Actor	Film	Age (in years)
Oldest winner	Jeffrey Wright	American Fiction	58
Oldest nominee	Denzel Washington	Highest 2 Lowest	70
Youngest winner	Michael B. Jordan	Sinners	39
Youngest nominee	Chase Infiniti	One Battle After Another	25
