= Syreeta Singleton =

American producer and writer

- Born: Los Angeles, California, U.S.
- Occupations: Writer, producer
- Notable work: One of Them Days

Syreeta Singleton is an American producer and writer. She wrote for the series Black Monday, Central Park, and Insecure and served as the showrunner of Rap Sh!t. Her debut feature screenplay One of Them Days (starring Keke Palmer and SZA) was nominated for two Black Reel Awards and an Independent Spirit Award.

== Life and career ==
Singleton was born and raised in Los Angeles. She began writing stories, raps, and poems during childhood. She received a degree in public relations and later worked as a production assistant. She worked full time as a publicist before shifting to focus on screenwriting. She met Issa Rae at a workshop for content creators and Rae agreed to co-produce Singleton's first comedy screenplay. Singleton later collaborated with Rae on Insecure; she began as Prentice Penny's assistant on the first season, before transitioning to staff writer. In 2019, a re-imagining of Set It Off to be produced by Rae and co-written with Nina Gloster was announced. In 2021, she signed a one-year overall deal with HBO and Max.

Next, Issa Rae asked Singleton to serve as showrunner for Rae's second scripted series, Rap Sh!t, which ran for two seasons. Singleton was also a writer for Black Monday and Central Park.

Her debut feature film screenplay, One of Them Days, premiered in January 2025. The comedy, starring, Keke Palmer and SZA, received positive critical reception.

== Awards and nominations ==
| Award | Year | Category | Nominated work | Result | Ref. |
|---|---|---|---|---|---|
| Black Reel Awards | 2020 | Outstanding Writing, Comedy Series | Insecure (for "Lowkey Movin' On") | Nominated | |
| Black Reel Awards | 2026 | Outstanding Screenplay | One of Them Days | Nominated | |
| Black Reel Awards | 2026 | Outstanding First Screenplay | One of Them Days | Won | |
| Gotham Awards | 2022 | Breakthrough Series – Shortform | Rap Sh!t | Nominated | |
| Independent Spirit Awards | 2026 | Best First Screenplay | One of Them Days | Nominated | |
| NAACP Image Awards | 2023 | Outstanding Breakthrough Creative (Television) | Rap Sh!t | Nominated | |
