= Rachael Abigail Holder =

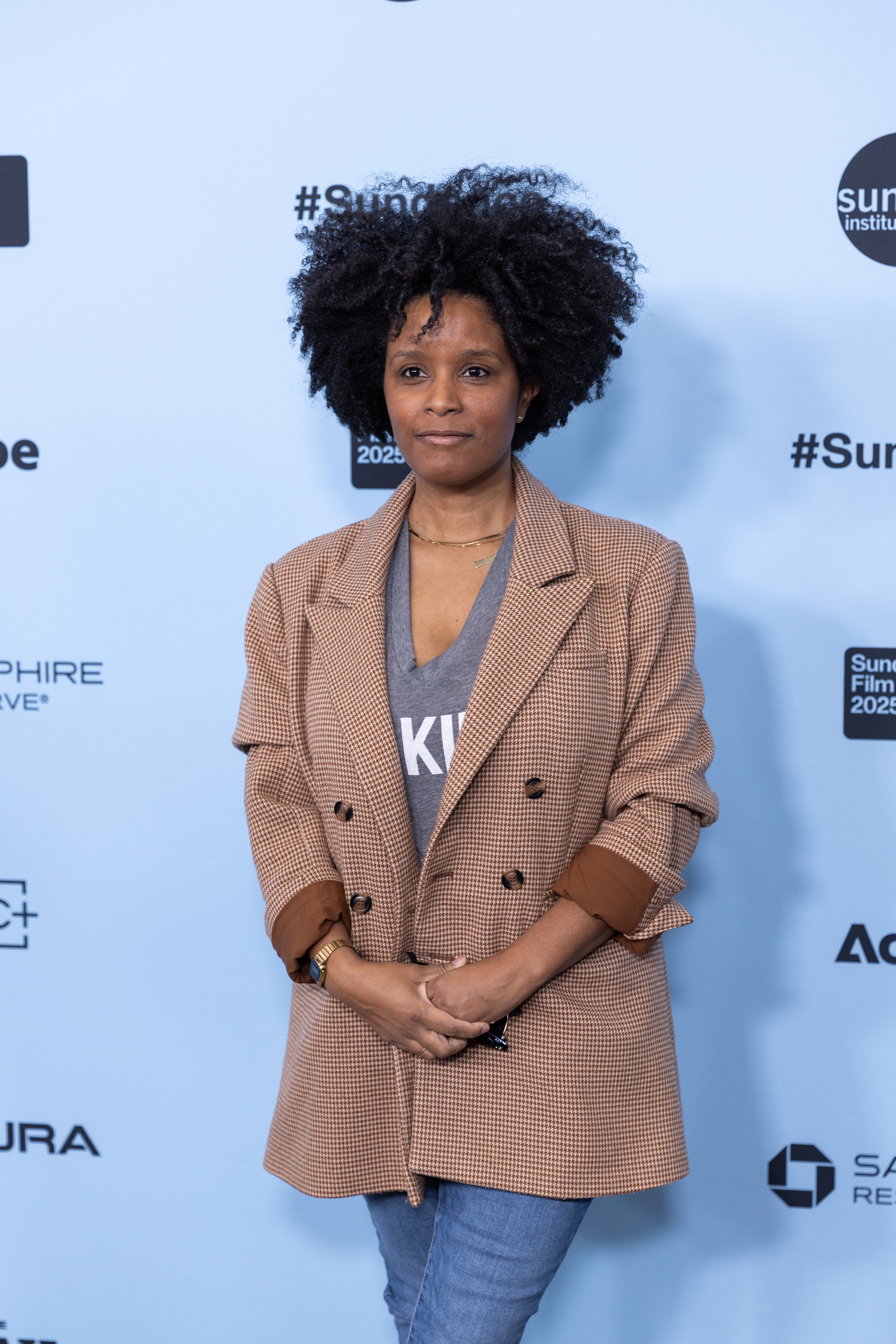
- Born: Long Island, New York, U.S.
- Education: Fordham University (BA); Tisch School of the Arts (MFA)
- Occupations: Director; producer; screenwriter

Rachael Abigail Holder is an American filmmaker. Her debut film Love Brooklyn (2025) won the Favorite Feature Narrative Audience Award at BlackStar Film Festival.

== Early life and education ==
Holder was born and raised on Long Island to Guyanese immigrants, attending Waldorf School in Garden City as one of few Black students in a predominately white neighborhood. She and her family went to Brooklyn every Sunday to attend church with other West Indian families.

She received her bachelor's degree in English at Fordham University. She moved to Brooklyn while studying to receive her MFA in dramatic writing at Tisch School of the Arts.

== Career ==
When Holder was 27 she moved to Los Angeles to pursue a filmmaking career. She released the breakout hit web series I Love Bekka & Lucy (2017), a semi-autobiographical comedy about her relationship with her best friend, as creator, writer, and director. Holder went on to direct television. Her credits includes Dickinson, Amber Brown, Run the World, Everything’s Gonna Be Okay, Love Is, and Florida Girls.

In 2025 Holder released her directorial debut film Love, Brooklyn. The romantic drama about a group of Black friends living in various areas of Brooklyn is based on a debut screenplay by Paul Zimmerman. Aaron Brokenbough Jr. wrote in a positive review for Brooklyn Magazine, "Love, Brooklyn is a work that refuses to be contained, spilling past the edges of the screen with a pulse that feels both intimate and expansive." It received the Favorite Feature Narrative Audience Award at BlackStar Film Festival.

== Personal life ==
Holder has lived in Jersey City since 2015.
