= Love, Brooklyn =

2025 American drama film

- Theatrical release poster
- Directed by: Rachael Abigail Holder
- Written by: Paul Zimmerman
- Produced by: André Holland; Kate Sharp; Patrick Wengler; Maurice Anderson; Liza Zusman
- Starring: André Holland; Nicole Beharie; DeWanda Wise; Roy Wood Jr.; Cassandra Freeman; Cadence Reese
- Cinematography: Martim Vian
- Edited by: Shawn Paper
- Music by: Joel P. West
- Production companies: Daughter Films; Harper Road Films; Fireheart Entertainment
- Distributed by: Greenwich Entertainment
- Release dates: January 27, 2025 (Sundance); August 29, 2025 (United States)
- Running time: 97 minutes
- Country: United States
- Language: English
- Box office: $254,846

Love, Brooklyn is a 2025 American drama film, directed by Rachael Abigail Holder, in her directorial debut, from a screenplay by Paul Zimmerman. It stars André Holland, Nicole Beharie, DeWanda Wise, Roy Wood Jr., Cassandra Freeman and Cadence Reese. Steven Soderbergh serves as an executive producer.

It premiered at the Sundance Film Festival on January 27, 2025, where it received generally positive reviews from critics.

== Premise ==
Three Brooklynites navigate love, loss, career and friendship.

== Cast ==
- André Holland as Roger
- Nicole Beharie as Casey
- DeWanda Wise as Nicole
- Roy Wood Jr. as Alan
- Saycon Sengbloh as Beth
- Cassandra Freeman as Lorna
- Cadence Reese as Ally
- Arjun Gupta as Patient
- Jack Haven (Note: Credited as Brigette Lundy-Paine) as Riley

== Production ==
Steven Soderbergh financed the film after it struggled to find financing.

== Release ==
Love, Brooklyn had its world premiere at the Sundance Film Festival on January 27, 2025. In May 2025, Greenwich Entertainment acquired distribution rights to the film. The film was theatrically released in the United States on August 29, 2025.

== Reception ==
=== Critical response ===
On the review aggregator website Rotten Tomatoes, 69% of 49 critics' reviews are positive. The website's consensus reads: "Love, Brooklyn is a tender, character-driven film whose emotional honesty and natural performances shine through a relaxed pace and underwritten story." Metacritic, which uses a weighted average, assigned the film a score of 62 out of 100, based on 13 critics, indicating "generally favorable" reviews.

=== Accolades ===
Association	Date	Category	Recipient(s)	Result	Ref.
Black Reel Awards	February 28, 2026	Outstanding Independent Film	Love, Brooklyn	Nominated	
Black Reel Awards	February 28, 2026	Outstanding Emerging Director	Rachael Holder	Nominated	
Black Reel Awards	February 28, 2026	Outstanding Lead Performance	André Holland	Nominated	
NAACP Image Awards	February 28, 2026	Outstanding Independent Motion Picture	Love, Brooklyn	Won	
NAACP Image Awards	February 28, 2026	Outstanding Actor in a Motion Picture	André Holland	Nominated	
NAACP Image Awards	February 28, 2026	Outstanding Breakthrough Creative (Motion Picture)	Rachael Abigail Holder	Nominated	
NAACP Image Awards	February 28, 2026	Outstanding Cinematography in a Feature Film	Martim Vian	Nominated	
NAACP Image Awards	February 28, 2026	Outstanding Costume Design	Missy Mickens	Nominated	
