= Oh My God… Yes! =

American adult animated television series

- Also known as: Oh My God... Yes! A Series of Extremely Relatable Circumstances
- Genre: Adult animation; Science fiction comedy; Slice of life
- Created by: Adele Williams
- Starring: Adele Williams; DomiNque Perry; Xosha Roquemore; Cree Summer; Gary Anthony Williams
- Country of origin: United States
- Original language: English
- No. of seasons: 1
- No. of episodes: 7 (+1 pilot)

Production
- Executive producers: Dominique Braud; Brendan Burch; Adele Williams; Wendy Willis
- Running time: 11 minutes
- Production companies: Williams Street; 6 Point Harness; Undercooked Rice; Honeywater Entertainment (pilot)

Original release
- Network: Adult Swim
- Release: March 10 – April 14, 2025

Oh My God... Yes! A Series of Extremely Relatable Circumstances, also known simply as Oh My God... Yes!, is an American adult animated comedy television series created by Adele Williams for Cartoon Network's nighttime programming block Adult Swim. The series stars Adele Williams, DomiNque Perry, Xosha Roquemore and Cree Summer (who is also the series' voice director). A pilot episode aired on Adult Swim on February 2, 2023. The pilot was later greenlit for a full series and officially premiered on the network on March 10, 2025. (Note: Adult Swim lists the official series premiere as airing on March 9 at 12:15 a.m. (24:15) EST/PST, which is effectively March 10.)

It is the first adult animated series to feature a black woman as a lead protagonist since the short-lived series Hey Monie! which aired in 2003.

== Premise ==
In 2102, best friend trio Sunny, Tulip and Ladi navigate their adulthood in South Central Los Angeles while also dealing with demon-babies, sex robots, anthropomorphic animals and rapping spiders that will continuously test their friendship.

== Cast and characters ==
- Adele Williams as Sunny Green
- DomiNque Perry as Tulip
- Xosha Roquemore as Ladi Olivia-Lawrence Sanchez IV

=== Additional voices ===
- Kelsy Abbott (in "Pilot") as Claire
- Andrew Frankel (in "Pilot")
- Dee Bradley Baker as Man Tiger (in "Like literally Eat Them?")
- Keith David as Toy COD Leader (in "Like literally Eat Them?")
- Arif Zahir as Tupick (in "Like literally Eat Them?")
- Jay Jurden as Gaylien Bouncer (in "Steel Ball Sounds Like a Very Dangerous Game")
- Chris Parnell as Ted (in "Steel Ball Sounds Like a Very Dangerous Game")
- DeRay Davis as Mechanic
- Bill Lobley as Demon Baby
- Cree Summer as Claire, Strawberry
- Gary Anthony Williams
- Tristen J. Winger as Jamal Warren 24

== Episodes ==
=== Pilot (2023) ===
Title	Directed by	Written by	Original release date
"Pilot"	Greg Franklin	Adele Williams	February 2, 2023

=== Season 1 (2025) ===
All episodes in HBO Max and digital purchase services are titled in lowercase.

No.	Title	Directed by	Written by	Original release date
1	"You Fools!"	Greg Franklin	Adele Williams & Branson Reese	March 10, 2025
Claire is about to give birth as Sunny's surrogate mother (as mentioned in "Pilot"), both Claire and Ladi warn that the baby is actually a antichrist demon cyborg which Sunny and Tulip ignore. Ladi shrinks herself and is inside Claire's womb to try to kill the baby. Before she could kill the baby, Claire gives birth. After the baby attacks Sunny, she punts the baby out of the window and the baby starts to cause havoc in LA. Tulip tries to teach parenting to Sunny. After Sunny gets eaten by the baby, Ladi defeats offscreen the baby and saves Sunny.
2	"Fieh"	Greg Franklin	Adele Williams	March 10, 2025
A rapping arachnid called F.I.E.H. (Fervid Idealist Eating Hornswoggle) (Gary Anthony Williams) raps about his life goals and abandons his little spider niece. Cyborg Strawberry breaks up with Tulip. After that, she falls in love with the spider as a coping mechanism and names him Rutherford, Ladi warns both Tulip and Sunny that the spider is lethal. While Tulip tries to liberate the spider it bits her and sends her to the hospital. Before he dies, the spider calls his sister Mary and insults her and Mary's daughter. At the spider's funeral, a narrator (Williams) suggests that the baby spider will do something that justifies the spider's actions but she won't; then says to the viewers that they saw a spider rap, do a handstand and die. An after credits end card mentions viewers to not kill spiders at their homes.
3	"Like Literally Eat Them?"	Bryan Newton	Adele Williams	March 17, 2025
Sunny throws a party after getting a lucrative brand endorsement with a beer company. A group of first generation Cyborgian Operative Decoys (COD's) targets her after a glitched prophecy tape from the COD's God, rapper Tupick, mentions that they should "eat the rich". Ladi and Tulip try to convince Sunny to not carelessly spend money and instead donate it to escape from the robots, but a drunken Sunny thinks they want her to be poor again. After the robots Google her net worth and realize she's not a millionaire, they let her go. Feeling insulted, Sunny goes on a rant and kicks the COD's projector, which fixes the tape and reveals that the prophecy was a beef advertisement.
4	"Steel Ball Sounds Like a Very Dangerous Game"	Greg Franklin	Kimberly Nicole Walker	March 24, 2025
Sunny dates Steel Ball player Jichael Mordan and he wants to have children, Mordan convinces Sunny that he will pay for the expenses of the child but Sunny finds out that she doesn't have her uterus. Ladi remembers that Sunny threw her uterus as a water balloon. Later, Sunny's friend, cult member Ted Banks tells that the sperm bank receives uteri donations. At the sperm bank the COD Receptionist denies Sunny's requests for an uterus, after Ladi kills the receptionist, injures the delivery man and destroy the box of fresh uteri, the delivery man says he has more boxes in his truck. Before they have sex Mordan and Sunny realize that The Bermuda Triangle (Who Mordan was playing against that day) stole Mordan's penis.
5	"23 and Me and Me and Me and Me and Me"	Bryan Newton	Taylor Ortega & Adele Williams	March 31, 2025
6	"A Beast a Broad and a Baker Whose Name is Warrenmacytom"	Bryan Newton	Adele Williams	April 7, 2025
7	"Or I'll Give You Something to Cry About"	Bryan Newton	Adele Williams	April 14, 2025
