= DomiNque Perry =

American actress (born 1988)

- Occupations: Actress; singer
- Years active: 2008–present

DomiNque Perry is an American actress. Perry is best known for her recurring roles on Insecure (2016–2017), Black Jesus (2019), Bust Down (2022) and Rap Sh!t (2022–2023).

== Filmography ==
=== Film ===
| Year | Title | Role | Notes |
|---|---|---|---|
| 2009 | Be My Teacher | Kendall | |
| 2012 | Because I Love You | Roxy | |
| 2014 | The Dead Don't Die | Zombie | Video |
| 2014 | Bridge the Gap | Bully #2 | Short |
| 2014 | Squatters | Crystal | |
| 2015 | Get Hard | Shonda | |
| 2015 | American Hero | Yolanda | |
| 2018 | A Boy. A Girl. A Dream. | - | |
| 2018 | The 30 Day Rule | Stacy Simmons | |
| 2019 | Perfectly Single | Angie | |
| 2019 | Deadly Dispatch | Amber | TV movie |
| 2019 | Christmas Belles | Porsha Baker | TV movie |
| 2021 | CompleX | Choice Millicent | |
| 2022 | Message and the Messenger | Jessica Clark | |
| 2022 | Why Wait? | Peaches | |
| 2025 | One of Them Days | Shameeka | |

=== Television ===
| Year | Title | Role | Notes |
|---|---|---|---|
| 2015 | Born Again Virgin | Splendid | Episode: "Secret Garden" |
| 2015 | JobHaterz | Platinum Diamond-Gold-Chain | Recurring Cast |
| 2016–17 | Insecure | Tasha | Recurring Cast: Season 1–2 |
| 2017 | Underground | Sally | Recurring Cast: Season 2 |
| 2017 | Tangled and Twisted | Sheila | Episode: "A Full Moon: Part 2" |
| 2018 | Snowfall | Donna | Episode: "The Offer" |
| 2018 | Rel | Charlene | Episode: "One Night Stand" |
| 2019 | Black Jesus | Nessa | Recurring Cast: Season 3 |
| 2021 | Bald | Date #1 | Episode: "Hair Plug?" |
| 2021 | We Stay Looking | Monica's Mom | Episode: "The Baby Boy Is Mine" |
| 2022 | Bust Down | Nina | Recurring Cast |
| 2022–23 | Rap Sh!t | Nelly | Recurring Cast |
| 2024 | Diarra from Detroit | Aja | Main Cast |
| 2025- | Oh My God... Yes! | Tulip (voice) | Main Cast |
