= Bill Lobley =

American comic actor (born 1960)

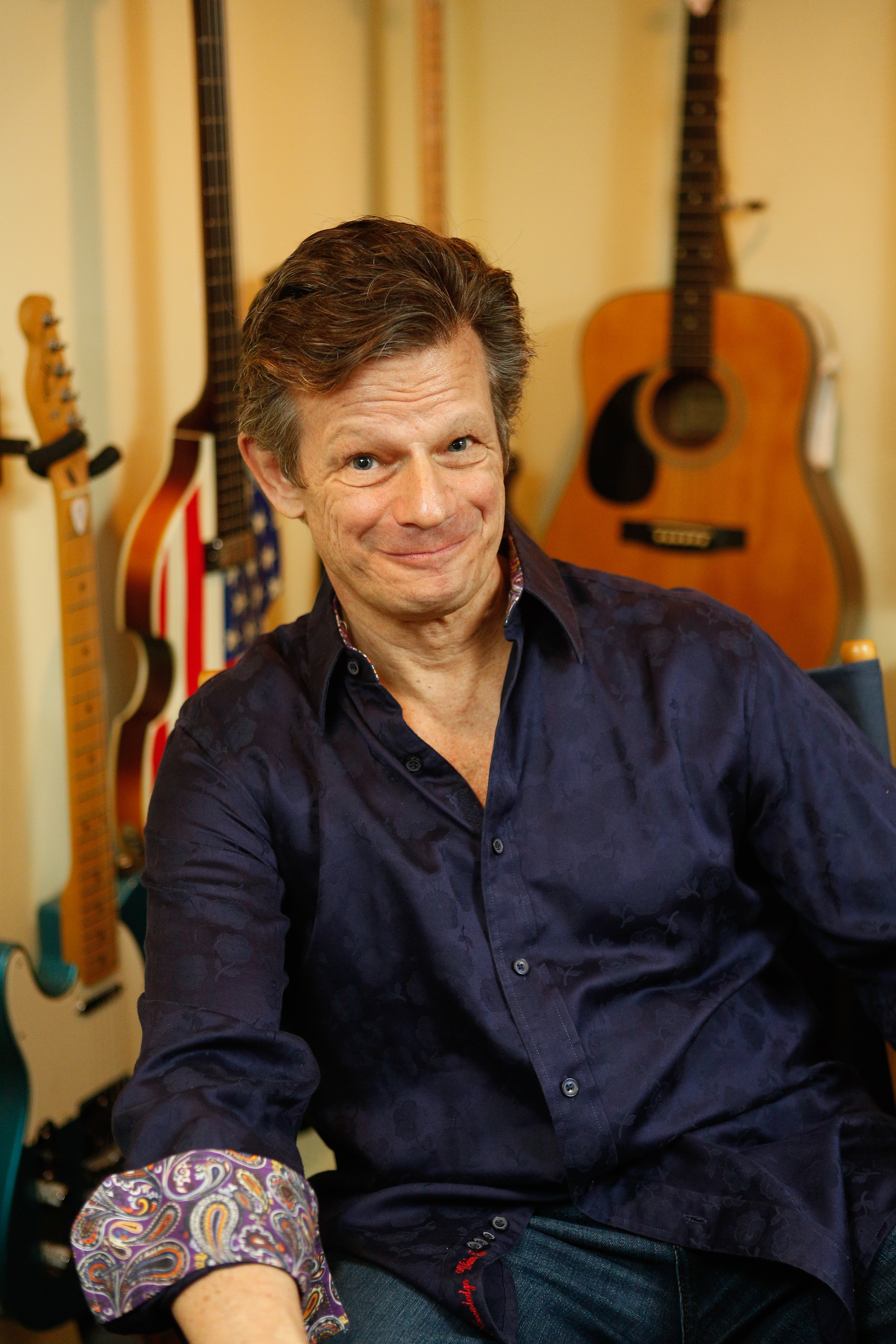
- Bill Lobley in 2023
- Born: Bronxville, New York, U.S.
- Other names: Seamus Dodd; Colin A. Favor; Bill Lobely
- Education: Fordham University
- Occupations: Actor, food and cocktail enthusiast
- Years active: 1997–present
- Spouse: Pam

Bill Lobley (born in Bronxville, New York) is an American comic actor known for his work in animation, commercials, and voiceovers for film, radio, and television; including Arcane, Adult Swim's Sealab 2021 and Oh My God... Yes!, Discovery's Animal Planet, and many best selling video games. He has voiced characters for both children's and adults' cartoons and audiobooks, as well as promos and narrations on cable, streaming and digital platforms.

== Biography ==
An alumnus of Fordham University, Lobley's background is in sketch comedy and improvisation. He additionally voiced many celebrity opponents on MTV's Celebrity Deathmatch, further establishing himself as a versatile and talented performer in both recreated and original characterizations. His most familiar role, however is Sparks, the sarcastic communications officer from the Adult Swim series Sealab 2021. He has also recorded many audio books. These include A Warrior's Heart, (the autobiography of Micky Ward), the popular Geronimo Stilton series and dozens of children's titles as well. His commercial work covers a wide range of on-camera and voiceover projects, including the one-time voice of the Parkay Margarine Tub and one of the current voices of McDonald's Hamburglar.

In 2009, his work in the Geronimo Stilton series earned the prestigious Benjamin Franklin Award for Best Children's Audio Book from the Independent Book Publishers' Association.

Additionally, his voice can be heard on a number of successful video games, including Fallout 76, Just Cause 3, the Grand Theft Auto series, the BioShock series, The Bureau: XCOM Declassified, Borderlands 2, The Darkness II, L.A. Noire, Neverwinter Nights 2, Alan Wake, Order Up!, Star Wars: The Old Republic, Mafia II, Red Dead Redemption 2, Earth Defense Force: Iron Rain and Alone in the Dark.

In 2011, he performed the voice of Officer Dibble in Top Cat: The Movie and reprises the role in the 2015 Top Cat Begins. Other animation credits include Netflix's Arcane, Entergalactic, Adult Swim's Oh My God... Yes!, Nickelodeon's Butterbean's Cafe, Ice Age: Continental Drift and many Anime titles.

A food and cocktail enthusiast, he is the creator and host of the "Newsmeals.com" website. As the site's head chef, Lobley tackled trending news as well as cultural events and combines them with irreverent humor and creative recipes. This resulted in unusual dinner themes, like Local Food at Home, Pandemic Feasts, Lobster Romance, Empty Nesting, The Mueller Report, North Korean Disarmament, Government Shutdowns, Transgender Bathrooms, Gun Control, Occupy Wall Street, and TSA Patdowns as well as his frequent Crazy Oscar Dinners, which cleverly incorporated the names of Academy Award nominees into the menu. He recently prepared "Candidate Cocktails" lampooning the 2016 Republican Presidential Field on Fox News' late night program Redeye. He's had pieces on NBC's Today Food, and has parodied Food Trends on networks like, CNN, MSNBC, and News 12. He earned a Gourmet Cooking Certification in 2016.

Lobley recently reunited with his college rock group The Richie Beakman Band and has played venues across the tri-state area. The Band combines original tunes with intriguing covers of 80's classics.

Along with recent comedic on-camera work in commercials, he appeared with Academy Award-winner Jennifer Hudson touting the Affordable Care Act playing a clueless, philandering Senator for the popular Funny or Die website.

== Filmography ==
=== Actor ===
- You Are Here (1997) - Docile
- Billy & Bobby: The Hollywood Years (Short 1998) - Billy Lowell
- Devil in the Flesh 2 (2000) - Janitor 1, Janitor 2
- Sealab 2021 (TV Series 2000-2005) - Jodene Sparks, President, Various (voices)
- Celebrity Deathmatch (TV Series 2001) - George Clooney, Warren Beatty, Tim Robbins (voices)
- NYPD Blue (TV Series 2001) - Car Owner
- Ed (TV Series 2003) - District Attorney
- Hey Joel (TV Series 2003) - David Letterman (voice)
- Grand Theft Auto: Vice City Stories (Video Game 2006) - Ernest Keigel, The Time Ranger (voices, uncredited)
- Neverwinter Nights 2 (Video Game 2006) - Georg Redfell, Judge Oleff (voices)
- Grand Theft Auto IV (Video Game 2008) - Commander, Alien (voices)
- Alone in the Dark (Video Game 2008) - Additional voices (voice)
- Order Up! (Video Game 2008) - Crispin Brown, Larry Cheezler, Generic Patric (voices)
- World of Zoo (Video Game 2009) - Animal Vocalizations (voice)
- Grand Theft Auto: The Ballad of Gay Tony (Video Game 2009) - Commander (voice)
- Grand Theft Auto IV: The Lost and Damned (Video Game 2009) - Commander, HR Officer, President Zane (voices)
- BioShock 2 (Video Game 2010) - Stanley Poole (voice)
- Alan Wake (Video Game 2010) - Deputy Thornton (voice)
- Mafia II (Video Game 2010) - Prison Guard 1, DJ (voices, as Bill Lobely also)
- L.A. Noire (Video Game 2011) - Radio Voice (voice)
- Star Wars: The Old Republic (Video Game 2011) - Additional voices (voice)
- The Darkness II (Video Game 2012) - Bragg, additional voices (voice)
- Ice Age: Continental Drift (2012) - Additional voices (voice)
- BioShock: Infinite (Video Game 2013) - Jeremiah Fink (voice)
- The Bureau: XCOM Declassified (Video Game 2013) - Officer Rose, additional voices (voice)
- Top Cat: The Movie (2013) - Officer Dibble (English version, voice)
- Grand Theft Auto V (Video Game 2013) - Redwood Indian, Paperboy, Sebastian, Teacher, Commander, President Zane (voices, as Bill Lobeley also)
- Scandalous with Jennifer Hudson (Video short 2013) - Senator
- The Unfortunate Death of Major Andre (Short 2013) - Joseph Stansbury
- BioShock Infinite: Burial at Sea (Video Game 2014) - Jeremiah Fink, Lonnie (voices)
- Welcome to the Wayne (Video short 2014) - Flowershirt, George the Doorman (voices)
- Phantom Boy (2015) - Captain Simon (voice)
- Just Cause 3 (Video Game 2015) - Sheldon (voice)
- Underdogs (2016) - ADR Loop Group
- BioShock 2: Remastered (Video Game 2016) - Stanley Poole (voice)
- Lastman (TV Series 2017) - Eric Rose, additional voices (voice)
- The Guardian Brothers (2017) - Deputy 3 (voice)
- Top Cat Begins (2017) - Officer Dibble (voice)
- Fireworks (2018) - Norimichi's Father, Yusuke's Father, additional voices (English version, voices, as Colin A. Favor)
- MFKZ (2018) - Professor Fagor (English version, voice)
- Red Dead Redemption 2 (Video Game 2018) - The Local Pedestrian Population (voice)
- Mazinger Z: INFINITY (2019) - Count Brocken, additional voices (English version, voice, as Colin A. Favor)
- Earth Defense Force: Iron Rain - (Video Game 2019) - Soldiers (English version, voice, as Colin A. Favor)
- Fallout 76: Wastelanders (Video Game 2020) - Narrator, Automated System, Crane, Radical Ganger, Skinner, Vault-Tec Spokesman (voices)
- Fallout 76: Steel Dawn (Video Game 2020) - Red Rocket Robot (voice)
- Arcane (TV Series 2021-2024) - Huck (voice)
- Entergalactic (TV Special 2022) - Oleg, New Yorker, Taxi Driver (voices)
- Oh My God... Yes! (TV Series 2023-2025) - General Sperm, WarrenMacyTom, Baby, COD Cop (voices)

=== Miscellaneous ===
- Hail, Caesar! (2016) - (voice)
- Red Dead Redemption 2 (2018) - (Additional Motion Capture)

=== Writer ===
- Billy & Bobby: The Hollywood Years (Short 1998) - (writer)

=== Soundtrack ===
- BioShock: Infinite (Video Game 2013) - ("Goodnight Irene")

=== Archive Footage ===
- Grand Theft Auto: Episodes from Liberty City (Video Game 2010) - Commander (voice)

=== Commercials ===
- Popeyes (1998-2000) - Zeke (voice)
- Parkay (1999-2002) - Voice of the Parkay Margarine Tub
- Eight Legged Freaks (2002) - Jodene Sparks (voice)
- Mercedes-Benz (2015) - Fox, Snail, Possum (voices)
- GEICO (2017) - Skeletor (voice)
- McDonald's (2022) - Hamburglar (voice)
