= Devon Terrell =

Australian actor (born 1992)

- Born: 23 October 1992 (age 34); Long Beach, California, U.S.
- Education: Edith Cowan University; National Institute of Dramatic Art
- Occupation: Actor
- Notable work: Barry

Devon Terrell (born 23 October 1992) is an Australian actor, best known for playing a young Barack Obama in the 2016 biographical film Barry and Arthur in the Netflix original series Cursed.

== Early life and education ==
Terrell was born in Long Beach, California, US, to an African-American father and an Anglo-Indian mother. At age five, he moved to Perth, Western Australia, growing up in the Forest Lakes estate in Thornlie. After finishing his secondary education at Lynwood Senior High School, he attended Edith Cowan University, specialising in drama education. He graduated from the National Institute of Dramatic Art in 2013.

== Career ==
Terrell's first role was in Steve McQueen's HBO miniseries Codes of Conduct, which was cancelled after the pilot was filmed. He then starred in the Netflix film Barry, a biopic about the college years of future US president Barack Obama. Terrell said that he felt an affinity for Obama and that the president had been his dream role since the age of 19.

To prepare for the role, Terrell worked with a dialect coach and watched Obama's speeches to master his accent and manner of speaking. He was offered the part after one audition. He also trained himself to portray the left-handed Obama, including learning how to write and play basketball with his left hand. He read Obama's book Dreams from My Father three times to get into his mindset, and he received praise for his portrayal when the film was released.

Later, he portrayed Arthur in the Netflix original series Cursed. The first season was released on 17 July 2020.

Terrell played the role of Cliff in Issa Rae's comedy television series Rap Shit, which premiered on 21 July 2022 on HBO Max.

In August 2024, it was reported that Terrell had joined the cast of the crime thriller television series The Assassin.

== Filmography ==
=== Film ===
Year	Title	Role	Notes
2016	Barry	Barack Obama	
2018	Ophelia	Horatio	
2018	The Professor	Danny Albright	
2024	It's What's Inside	Reuben	

=== Television ===
Year	Title	Role	Notes
2016	Codes of Conduct	Beverly Snow	Unaired pilot
2020	Cursed	Arthur	Main cast
2022	Rap Shit	Cliff	Main cast
2023	Totally Completely Fine	Dane	Main cast
2025	The Assassin	Ezra	Main cast
2025	Good Cop/Bad Cop	Det. Shane Carson	Main cast
