= Barry (2016 film) =

2016 film by Vikram Gandhi

- Film poster
- Directed by: Vikram Gandhi
- Written by: Adam Mansbach
- Produced by: Vikram Gandhi; Dana O'Keefe; Teddy Schwarzman; Ben Stillman
- Starring: Devon Terrell; Anya Taylor-Joy; Jason Mitchell; Ashley Judd; Jenna Elfman; Ellar Coltrane; Avi Nash; Linus Roache
- Cinematography: Adam Newport-Berra
- Edited by: Jacob Craycroft
- Music by: Danny Bensi; Saunder Jurriaans
- Production companies: Black Bear Pictures; Cinetic Media
- Distributed by: Netflix
- Release dates: September 10, 2016 (TIFF); December 16, 2016 (United States)
- Running time: 104 minutes
- Country: United States
- Language: English

Barry is a 2016 American biographical drama film directed by Vikram Gandhi about Barack "Barry" Obama's life at Columbia University in 1981. It stars Devon Terrell, Anya Taylor-Joy, Jason Mitchell, Ashley Judd, Jenna Elfman, Ellar Coltrane, Avi Nash, and Linus Roache. It was screened in the Special Presentations section at the 2016 Toronto International Film Festival. The film was released on Netflix on December 16, 2016.

== Plot ==
In 1981, a 20-year-old Barack Obama, commonly known as Barry, arrives in New York City to attend Columbia University as a transfer student from Occidental College. Unable to contact his expected roommate, Will, Barry spends the night in the streets. The next day, Barry succeeds in contacting Saleem, a man he met at a party a few months back, who welcomes him in his apartment. Later, Barry meets his roommate Will and they both begin to live in their off-campus apartment on 109th street. As they are walking to class, Barry meets his neighbors when one of them asks for a cigarette. In class, Barry is engaged as a student and participates in classroom debates about philosophy and American society. While in New York, he behaves as a man apart from everyone, not sure of what he has to do to feel accepted. During his political science class, Barry meets Charlotte, a nice girl who seems to have an interest for debates. When he is not in class, Barry is playing basketball.

While playing basketball, Barry soon gets nicknamed "The Invisible Man" by PJ, a graduate student at Columbia who grew up in the Grants Houses in Harlem. Later that night, Will and Barry both attend a frat party at Columbia where they see Charlotte again. Charlotte and Barry leave the party and go to a club downtown where they form a closer connection and begin to date.

The next day, Charlotte and Barry watch a political debate on TV. While Barry is inattentive about politics and declares his love really lies in art, Charlotte tells him it's his "civic duty" to care about politics and their nation. As their love interest grows, Barry continues to wonder about his place in society, New York, and the condition of other black people in the city. The next day Charlotte and Barry go on a date in Central Park, and later that day after playing basketball within Columbia, Barry grabs lunch with PJ, who tells him he's majoring in finance and hopes to work at the New York Stock Exchange in Wall Street. Around Thanksgiving, at a bar with Barry and Saleem, Charlotte asks Barry to meet her parents. Barry refuses and Charlotte then asks him to meet them later on at her sister's wedding. Finally, Barry accepts. In Harlem, he experiences the contrast of black life in New York City, from speaking with friends and buying the book The Souls of Black Folk by W. E. B. Du Bois to witnessing a vulgar confrontation between a white woman and a group of Black Hebrew Israelites. Later in the park, he attempts to write a long, overdue letter to his father in Kenya but struggles to find the words. After going back to Saleem's apartment, Charlotte and Barry are surprised to find Barry's mother, Ann Dunham, there. Charlotte asks many questions of Ann about Barry's father and childhood as she is frustrated that Barry kept so much of his private life to himself. That night, Barry and his mom see a movie and walk around Central Park where he discloses to her that he is unsure about his place in New York and where he feels he should belong. Ann tries her best to reassure him, but the answers leave him unsatisfied. The next day, Barry is invited to a private club and is welcomed by Charlotte's parents Kathy and Bill and enjoys a nice dinner with them. Barry explains his early life to Charlotte's parents – his mixed race parents, their backgrounds, and his living situation in Hawaii, Indonesia and California, but Charlotte feels closed-off as Barry rarely discloses anything personal to her. While walking home Barry and Charlotte have an aggressive and potentially violent confrontation with a friend of his neighbor's, who resents his presence in the neighborhood and views Barry as an elitist. The following morning, Barry and Charlotte are walking in Harlem when Barry begins to feel uncomfortable as people are surprised to see him with a white woman.

At lunch this anxious feeling continues as Barry explains to Charlotte that everybody is looking at him. They have an argument which ends with Charlotte saying to Barry that she loves him. Barry, surprised, only responds "thank you", then leaves to go play basketball.

The following day, Barry is invited by PJ and the people in his basketball group to attend a party in Harlem. At the party, Barry learns about New York's housing projects and the treatment reserved to the lower classes. Barry also meets an attractive woman named Denise and is then punched in the face by Denise's boyfriend, who thought that Barry was attempting to seduce her. As Barry leaves the party drunk, he returns to campus only to be racially profiled by security guard Eddie and asked to show his ID to confirm he's a student. Barry begins to get into an angry argument with Eddie, but Thad, a white classmate from his political science class who is openly holding a beer can, intervenes. Frustrated by Thad's personality and his lack of acknowledgement of the double standards around him, Barry calls Thad an "asshole" and then goes to Charlotte's apartment where he attempts to hook-up with her. Charlotte refuses when she sees the wound on his face and tries to comfort him. While sitting on her bed looking at pictures she took of him -noting that almost none featured him- Barry gets in a fight with Charlotte and questions their relationship until Charlotte goes to sleep and leaves him alone.

A few days later on the day of Charlotte's sister's wedding, Barry receives a phone call. He learns that his father has died in a car accident. Shocked, Barry doesn't talk to Charlotte about it while they are on their way to her sister's wedding and becomes very closed off when Charlotte tries to understand what Barry is keeping to himself. At the wedding, Charlotte's mother introduces Barry to James and Grace Lee Boggs, a mixed race couple in their late 50s who were involved as civil rights activists in the 1960s. Barry confides in them about his inner turmoil and the confusion he has about his identity. The couple reassures him that, above all else, he is American and he is not obligated to choose a social standing. They tell him that he should take inspiration from the ones who came before him and to carry the baton of hope as far as he can. Finally, Barry receives advice that begins to comfort him and he starts to find peace within himself.

Later at the wedding, while they're dancing, it is assumed Barry breaks up with Charlotte as he simply leaves her on the dance floor; he then goes for a walk outside and reads the letter he was going to send to his father as he was finally trying to contact him. A few days later, Barry is playing basketball where he meets a boy who resembles him, and together they play HORSE. The boy asks him where he is from, a question Barry has always struggled to answer. Much more at ease with himself, Barry answers the question by saying, "I'm from a lot of places, but I live here now."

== Cast ==
- Devon Terrell as Barry Obama
- Anya Taylor-Joy as Charlotte Baughman, a composite character based on Obama's several girlfriends while in college.
- Jason Mitchell as PJ
- Ellar Coltrane as Will
- Ashley Judd as Ann Dunham
- Jenna Elfman as Kathy Baughman
- Avi Nash as Saleem
- John Benjamin Hickey as Professor Gray
- Tommy Nelson as Buzz
- Linus Roache as Bill Baughman
- Danny Hoch as Eddie
- Sawyer Pierce as Thad
- Robert G. McKay as James Boggs
- Marion Kodama Yue as Grace Lee Boggs

== Production ==
In March 2016, it was announced Devon Terrell and Anya Taylor-Joy had been cast in the film, with Vikram Gandhi directing and producing the film from a screenplay by Adam Mansbach, with Teddy Schwarzman and Ben Stillman producing under their Black Bear Pictures banner, while Dana O'Keefe will also serve as a producer through her Cinetic Media banner. That same month, Jason Mitchell and Ellar Coltrane joined the cast of the film. In May 2016, it was announced that Famke Janssen had joined the cast.

== Release ==
The film had its world premiere at the 2016 Toronto International Film Festival on September 10, 2016. Shortly after, Netflix acquired global distribution rights to the film. The film was released on December 16, 2016.

== Critical reception ==
Barry received positive reviews from film critics, and holds an 80% approval rating on review aggregator website Rotten Tomatoes, based on 46 reviews, with an average rating of 6.91/10. The critics' consensus states: "Barry opens a speculative window into a future president's formative college years, offering a flawed yet compelling glimpse of American history in the making." On Metacritic, the film holds a rating of 72 out of 100, based on 17 critics, indicating "generally favorable" reviews.

== See also ==
- Southside with You, a romantic drama film about Obama's first date with Michelle Robinson, also released in 2016.
