= Rizi Timane =

Nigerian transgender man

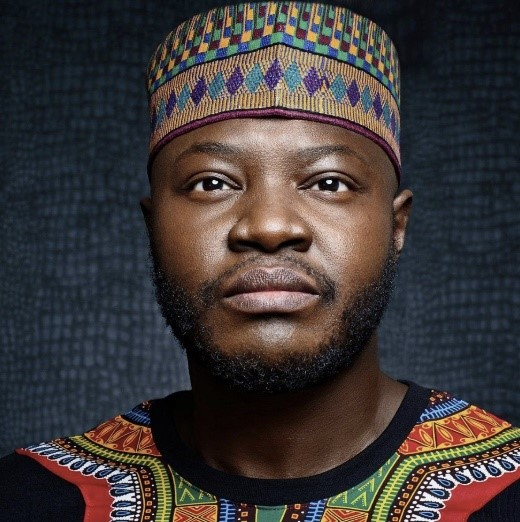
- Citizenship: Nigeria, United States
- Occupations: Actor, Psychotherapist, Singer

Rizi Xavier Timane is a Nigerian musician, minister, writer, and a transgender man.

== Early life ==
He was born in Lagos State, Nigeria. When he was 8 years old, he faced many challenges from both parents and his pastor immediately when they discovered that he possessed both male and female genitals. He had 20 surgical procedures to transition from female to male.

== Education and career ==
He studied business management in London and Los Angeles and earned his second degree in social work from the University of Southern California. He also studied religion at Claremont School of Theology. He worked as a health practitioner for transgender children at St. John's Well Child and Family Centre in Los Angeles.

Rizi Timane is an actor and has appeared in One of Them Days, a relaxing American comedy-drama featuring SZA and Keke Palmer, where he played demanding landlord, Uche. He has also appeared in other movies and TV Series such as Insecure, Decker, The American King, Bloodthirst and New Amsterdam.

== Impact ==
In 2013, he wrote a book titled "An Unspoken Compromise". In 2014, he released an album titled "Love is Stronger". He also donated money for transgender children to get the surgeries that he had also gotten previously. He has continuously advocated for the rights of LGBT+ people in Nigeria through his writing.

He married Christina Ros and in 2017 he celebrated his 10th wedding anniversary. They live in Los Angeles and have a daughter.
