= KaMillion =

American rapper, singer, songwriter, and actress

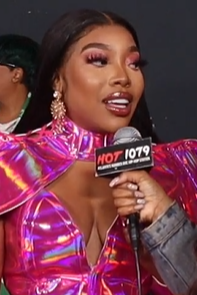
- KaMillion in 2022
- Born: June 26, 1989 (age 37); Jacksonville, Florida, U.S.
- Other name: Alja Jackson
- Occupations: Rapper; singer; songwriter; actress
- Years active: 2005-present
- Television: Rap Sh!t; Love & Hip Hop: Miami
- Musical career
- Genres: Hip hop; trap; southern hip hop; R&B
- Label: Interscope Records

Alja Jackson, professionally known as KaMillion and previously known as Alja KaMillion, is an American rapper, singer, songwriter, and actress. She was a cast member on season 3 of Love & Hip Hop: Miami and formerly co-starred on the Max comedy series Rap Sh!t.

== Life and career ==
KaMillion was born and raised in Jacksonville, Florida on the city's north side.

KaMillion began her career as a background dancer and vocalist, before establishing herself as a songwriter for artists such as Jordin Sparks, Rihanna, and Diddy. In 2019, she received a Grammy Award for Best R&B Album for her songwriting credits on H.E.R.'s self-titled album. That year she and Lil Duval were the opening act for the BET Hip Hop Awards.

She gained wider prominence in 2020 after she joined the cast of season three of Love & Hip Hop: Miami. The track "Twerk 4 Me" went viral that year, although it was originally released in 2018. Her track "Fine Azz" is the theme song for A Black Lady Sketch Show's second season.

KaMillion has acted on shows including Star and The Quad. In 2022, she appeared in her first lead role as the character Mia Knight on the Max comedy series Rap Sh!t, loosely based on Yung Miami of City Girls. For her performance she was nominated for an Independent Spirit Award for Best Lead Performance in a New Scripted Series. Angie Han of the Hollywood Reporter advocated for her to receive a Primetime Emmy Award nomination: "Much of the pleasure of Rap Sh!t is simply how well KaMillion connects with the camera. She makes Mia’s joy infectious and her warmth palpable. She’s magnetic as a rapper and dancer, even when the pair are just playing around in Shawna’s makeshift studio."

== Songwriting credits ==
- Diddy – Dirty Money featuring Trey Songz – "Your Love" (2010)
- Trey Songz – "Already Taken" (2010)
- Rihanna – "Watch n' Learn" (2011)
- Keke Palmer – "Love Me, Love Me Not" and "Takes Me Away" (2012)
- Jordin Sparks – "1000" (2015)
- Samantha Jade – ""Let the Good Times Roll"
- H.E.R.- "Rather Be" (2019)
- Boosie Bad Azz - Kicking Cloudz

== Filmography ==
| Year | Title | Role | Notes | ' |
| 2012 | Joyful Noise | Holy Vision Church of Detroit Choir Member | Credited as Alja Jackson | |
| 2017 | The Quad | Female Vocalist | Credited as Alja KaMillion; Season 1, Episode 3 | |
| 2017 | When Love Kills: The Falicia Blakely Story | Meesha | Credited as Alja KaMillion | |
| 2017 | Star | Meesha | Credited as Alja KaMillion; Season 2, Episode 3 | |
| 2020 | Love & Hip Hop: Miami | Herself | Guest; Season 3 | |
| 2022–2023 | Rap Sh!t | Mia Knight | Main role | |
| 2023 | Wild 'n Out | Herself | Guest | |

== Awards and nominations ==
| Year | Award | Category | Nominated work | Result | Ref. |
|---|---|---|---|---|---|
| 2019 | Grammy Award | Best R&B Album | H.E.R. | Won | |
| 2023 | Independent Spirit Awards | Best Lead Performance in a New Scripted Series | Rap Sh!t | Nominated | |
