= Aida Osman =

American actor and comedian (born 1997)

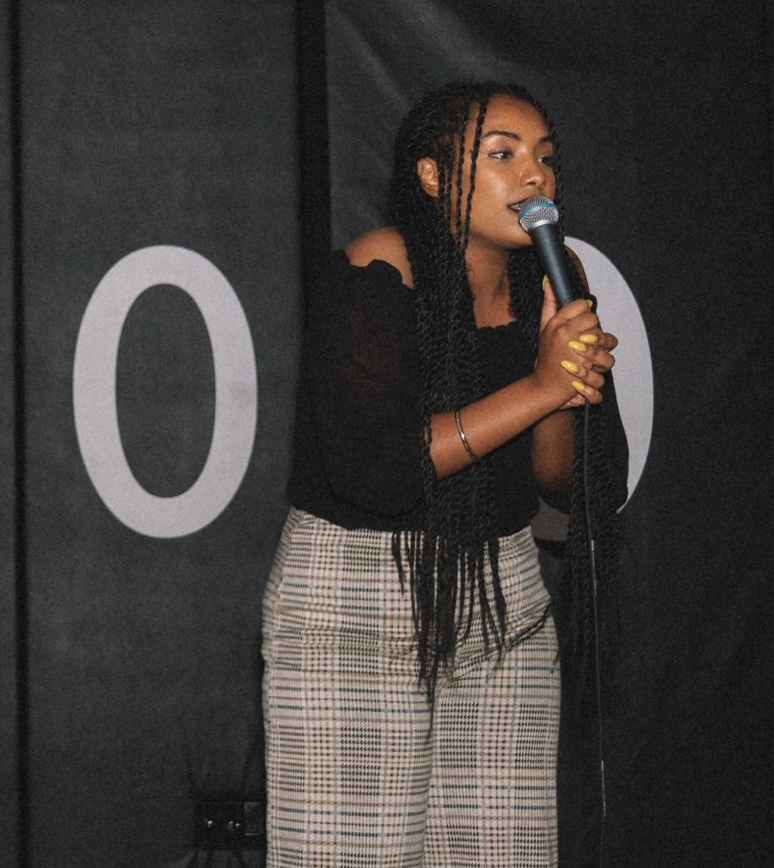
- Osman performing
- Born: July 11, 1997 (age 29); Lincoln, Nebraska, U.S.
- Education: University of Nebraska–Lincoln
- Occupations: Writer; comedian; actress
- Spouse: Earl Sweatshirt (m. 2025)
- Children: 1

Aida Osman (born July 11, 1997) is an American writer, stand-up comedian, and actress. She is a former co-host of the podcast, Keep It. She has written for Big Mouth, Betty, and the HBO Max series Rap Sh!t, on which she was also a staff writer and co-star.

== Early life and education ==
Osman was born on July 11, 1997. She grew up in Lincoln, Nebraska where she was raised Muslim. She aspired to a career related to writing and music from youth. Osman participated in show choir, played cello in the school orchestra growing up, played drums in band for a semester, and was active in musical theatre in high school. She graduated from Northeast High School in 2014.

Osman attended the University of Nebraska–Lincoln and graduated with a bachelor's degree in philosophy in 2018. She was accepted into law school, but deferred her admission to pursue comedy. She began performing stand-up comedy in Nebraska and moved to New York City in 2019.

== Career ==
Osman amassed a large following on Twitter in 2018. Her first television appearance was Wild 'n Out on MTV. She next wrote for Complex and then starred in the Complex Networks web series Group Therapy. Osman then relocated to Los Angeles to co-host the pop culture podcast Keep It for Crooked Media.

She has written for the Netflix show Big Mouth and the HBO series Betty. In 2022, Osman made her debut lead television role as a co-star and staff writer for Rap Sh!t on HBO Max.

== Personal life ==
Osman resides in Los Angeles.

Aida is passionate about humanitarian work. In 2020, Osman started a GoFundMe for David McAtee that raised over $200,000 in its first day, ultimately raising almost $1,000,000 for the McAtee family.

In 2024, Osman made the decision to pursue sobriety with her partner and friends.

In 2025, Osman married rapper Earl Sweatshirt, with whom she had been in a relationship since August 2022. Osman gave birth to a daughter in July 2025.

== Television ==
Year	Title	Role	Notes
2022	Rap Shit	Shawna	Main Role
2022	Ramy	Malika	1 episode
2026	The Hawk	Crystal	3 episodes

== Filmography ==
=== Film ===
Year	Title	Role	Notes
2024	The Young Wife	Sabrina	Actress

== Accolades ==
- 2023, Forbes 30 under 30 (Hollywood and Entertainment)
