= R. T. Thorne =

Canadian film and television director

R.T. Thorne
- Born: Randall Thorne; Calgary, Alberta, Canada
- Occupations: Filmmaker, Television director, Writer, Producer
- Years active: 2001–present

Randall Thorne, better known by his pseudonyms RT! and R.T. Thorne, is a Canadian writer, producer and director. He began his career as a music video director for Sean Paul, George Nozuka, Keshia Chanté and Shawn Desman, before directing episodes of television.

== Life and career ==
Thorne was born in Calgary, Alberta, Canada. After winning 17 International music video awards, and working with international music artists like Drake and Snoop Dogg, R.T. moved into long-form filmmaking in 2012. In May 2012, Thorne began serving on the board of directors of The Remix Project, a non-profit cultural incubator that aims to increase access to the "creative industries" for underprivileged and marginalized youth. In the Fall of 2009, the Remix Project partnered with Team Seven Productions and Temple Street Productions to create CITYLIFE, a new educational initiative that aimed to create short films from the voices of inner city youth.

In 2015, R.T. wrote, directed and co-produced The Time Traveler, which won best short film at the Canadian Film Festival.

In 2018, R.T. was accepted to the prestigious Toronto International Film Festival's Talent Lab to develop his debut feature.

In 2020, R.T. created, executive produced and directed, Utopia Falls, a Afrofuturistic YA science fiction series that premiered as a HULU Original The series was nominated for 3 Canadian Screen Awards, including Best Director for Thorne.

In 2023, R.T. was named Playback Magazine's "Director of the Year".

Thorne most recently directed episodes of the acclaimed Cross series for Amazon and Blue Monday Productions as well as Hate The Player, a Paramount+ and New Metric Media production.

== The Porter ==
In 2021 R.T. Thorne partnered on the creation of a series about a group of railway workers who formed the first Black-led Labour union called THE PORTER. created by Arnold Pinnock and Bruce Ramsay, with the participation of Annmarie Morais, Marsha Greene, Charles Officer and R.T. Thorne as producers, with Officer and Thorne also directing. The series is written by Morais, Greene, Andrew Burrows-Trotman, Priscilla White, Pinnock and Ramsay, with R.T. Thorne participating in the writers' room. The series has received positive reviews from critics. On the review aggregation website Rotten Tomatoes, The Porter holds an approval rating of 100%.

The Porter was the most nominated show at the 11th Canadian Screen Awards, leading with 19 nominations, including a BEST DIRECTOR nomination for Thorne. The series ultimately went on to win a record 12 Awards.

== 40 Acres ==
In 2024, Thorne made his feature writing and directing debut with 40 Acres, starring Danielle Deadwyler. The film premiered at the Toronto International Film Festival, where it was named one of the festival's Top 10 films. 40 Acres had its International Premiere at the Red Sea Film Festival and its U.S. premiere at South by Southwest (SXSW). 40 Acres was acquired by Magnolia Pictures and had a limited release across North America in the summer of 2025 to critical acclaim, garnering a certified fresh score at 90% Rotten Tomatoes. Thorne won three awards at the 14th Canadian Screen Awards for the film, including Best Director.

The film was selected as a New York Times Critic’s Pick, with Robert Daniels praising it as a “striking post-apocalyptic thriller,” while The Washington Post highlighted its “hallmarks of a born director.” The film was named one of the top 51 Canadian films of all time by the Hollywood Reporter.

== Credits ==
=== Film ===
- 40 Acres (director and writer, 2024)

=== Television ===
- Alive (2013)
- Degrassi: The Next Generation (4 episodes, 2014)
- Make It Pop (2 episodes, 2016)
- Degrassi: Next Class (4 episodes, 2016)
- Dino Dana (1 episode, 2017)
- Backstage (13 episodes, 2016–2017)
- Find Me in Paris (13 episodes, 2018)
- Blindspot (1 episode, 2019)
- Utopia Falls (10 episodes, also creator, 2020)
- Frankie Drake Mysteries (2 episodes, 2021)
- Kung Fu (2 episodes, 2021–2022)
- The Porter (8 episodes, 2022)
- The Lake (2 episodes, 2023)
