= Miss Governor =

American sitcom

- Also known as: She the People
- Genre: Comedy
- Created by: Terri J. Vaughn; Niya Palmer
- Written by: Tyler Perry
- Directed by: Tyler Perry; Tina Gordon
- Starring: Terri J. Vaughn; Jade Novah; Drew Olivia Tillman; Tré Boyd; Dyon Brooks; Jo Marie Payton
- Original language: English
- No. of series: 1
- No. of episodes: 16

Production
- Executive producers: Tyler Perry; Niya Palmer; Keisha Lance Bottoms; Terri J. Vaughn; Tina Gordon (Note: Gordon is credited as executive producer beginning with episode 9.)
- Producers: Angi Bones; Tony Strickland
- Production company: Tyler Perry Studios

Original release
- Network: Netflix
- Release: May 22 – August 14, 2025

Miss Governor (formerly known as She the People) is a 2025 American sitcom created by Terri J. Vaughn and Niya Palmer. The series premiered on Netflix on May 22, 2025, with the first part comprising eight episodes, and a second part premiering on August 14, 2025. Set in Mississippi, the show follows Antoinette Dunkerson, portrayed by Terri J. Vaughn, who becomes the state's first Black lieutenant governor. While adjusting to her new political position under the supervision of a dismissive governor, Antoinette also faces the pressures that come with her family's unexpected exposure to public scrutiny. The cast features Jade Novah, Jo Marie Payton, Drew Olivia Tillman, Tré Boyd, and Dyon Brooks.

The series blends political satire with family comedy, highlighting themes such as systemic racism, gender dynamics, and the complexities of Southern politics. Critics have noted the show's attempt to tackle serious issues through humor, though some reviews suggest that its comedic approach may sometimes undermine the gravity of its themes. Despite mixed critiques, performances by the cast, particularly Vaughn's portrayal of Antoinette, have been praised for bringing depth and relatability to the narrative.

Miss Governor is produced by Tyler Perry Studios, with Tyler Perry serving as writer, director, and executive producer. Executive producers also include Niya Palmer, Keisha Lance Bottoms, and Terri J. Vaughn. The series is structured as a two-part season. The show is part of Netflix's 2025 programming lineup and is among its titles featuring a focus on varied perspectives and contemporary social themes.

On early March 2026, Vaughn informed that the show had been cancelled.

== Premise ==
Following a successful electoral campaign, Lieutenant Governor candidate Antoinette Dunkerson finds herself having to serve under a sexist and condescending governor while her family must adjust to being in the public eye.

— Netflix

== Cast and characters ==
=== Main ===
- Terri J. Vaughn as Lieutenant Governor candidate Antoinette Dunkerson
- Jade Novah as Shamika Latavia Latoya Farrah Dunkerson
- Drew Olivia Tillman as Lola Dunkerson
- Tré Boyd as Titus Dunkerson
- Dyon Brooks as Basil Henderson
- Jo Marie Payton as Cleo Dunkerson

=== Recurring ===
- Robert Craighead as Governor Erwin Harper
- Tony Robinette as Henry Clatterbuck
- Kevin Thoms as Jed Bonds
- Karon Riley as Michael Davies
- Denise Boutte as Kelly Thompson
- Tequilla Whitfield as Pamela Jackson
- T.C. Carson as Danny Leary

== Episodes ==
No.	Title	Directed by	Written by	Original release date
Part 1
1	"Vote for Me"	Tyler Perry	Story by : Terri J. Vaughn & Niya Palmer; Teleplay by : Tyler Perry & Terri J. Vaughn & Niya Palmer	May 22, 2025
2	"Every Woman"	Tyler Perry	Tyler Perry	May 22, 2025
3	"Lay of the Land"	Tyler Perry	Tyler Perry	May 22, 2025
4	"Little White Lies"	Tyler Perry	Tyler Perry	May 22, 2025
5	"Jar of Hearts"	Tyler Perry	Tyler Perry	May 22, 2025
6	"Getting Adjusted"	Tyler Perry	Tyler Perry	May 22, 2025
7	"Taking Charge"	Tyler Perry	Tyler Perry	May 22, 2025
8	"Standing on Business"	Tyler Perry	Tyler Perry	May 22, 2025
Part 2
9	"Thoughts & Prayers"	Tina Gordon	Tina Gordon	August 14, 2025
10	"Pardon Me"	Tina Gordon	Niya Palmer	August 14, 2025
11	"Black Excellence"	Tina Gordon	Niya Palmer	August 14, 2025
12	"Hot Mike"	Tina Gordon	Tina Gordon	August 14, 2025
13	"Take a Number"	Tina Gordon	Niya Palmer	August 14, 2025
14	"This Means War"	Tina Gordon	Tina Gordon	August 14, 2025
15	"Deaf Threats"	Tina Gordon	Tina Gordon	August 14, 2025
16	"State of Emergency"	Tina Gordon	Tina Gordon	August 14, 2025

== Production ==
The series is co-created by Tyler Perry and Niya Palmer. Perry is the writer, director and executive producer. Palmer is also an executive producer alongside Keisha Lance Bottoms, and Terri J. Vaughn. Angi Bones and Tony Strickland also produce for Tyler Perry Studios.

The cast is led by Terri J. Vaughn as a Mississippi Lieutenant Governor candidate. The cast also includes Jo Marie Payton, Jade Novah, Drew Olivia Tillman, Tré Boyd, Dyon Brooks, and Robert Craighead.

Principal photography for She the People began in 2024, combining on-location shoots and studio work to depict the series’ Mississippi setting. Jackson, Mississippi, served as a key filming site, with its historic buildings and neighborhoods used to reflect the political and cultural context of the narrative. Landmarks such as the Mississippi State Capitol were incorporated into scenes to represent government settings and aspects of the main character's political experience.

Interior scenes, including those set in government offices and residential spaces, were filmed at Tyler Perry Studios in Atlanta, Georgia. The studio facilities enabled greater control over production conditions. Additional scenes were also filmed in nearby Atlanta locations, including College Park and East Point, to provide visual variety.

== Broadcast ==
The eight-episode first part of the series premiered on Netflix on May 22, 2025. Part 2 was released on August 14, 2025.

== Reception ==
On Rotten Tomatoes Miss Governor has a score of 50% based on reviews from 6 critics.

Miss Governor has received mixed reviews. Some critics have argued that while the show attempts to explore topics such as systemic racism and gender roles through satire, its comedic elements can at times weaken the impact of these themes. Joel Keller at Decider observed that the series often leans on repetitive jokes and exaggerated characterizations, which may detract from its intended social commentary. Kwaves and Beyond described the satire as superficial and the characters as underdeveloped, suggesting the show functions more effectively as casual entertainment than as pointed political critique.

Caroline Siede of The Daily Beast acknowledged the show's potential for both comedic and dramatic growth, noting that it succeeds in moments which offer nuanced commentary on Southern history and regional politics.
