= NAACP Image Award for Outstanding Supporting Actress in a Comedy Series =

American acting award

This article lists the winners and nominees for the NAACP Image Award for Outstanding Supporting Actress in a Comedy Series. The award was first presented during the 1996 ceremony, and since its inception, Marsai Martin holds the record for the most wins with five.

== Winners and nominees ==
Winners are listed first and highlighted in bold.

=== 1990s ===
| Year | Actress | Series | Ref |
|---|---|---|---|
1996
| 1996 | **Tichina Arnold** | **Martin** | |
| 1996 | Marla Gibbs | Martin | |
| 1996 | Eartha Kitt | Living Single | |
| 1996 | Nia Long | The Fresh Prince of Bel Air | |
| 1996 | Daphne Reid | The Fresh Prince of Bel Air | |
| 1997 | —N/a | | |
1998
| 1998 | **Countess Vaughn** | **Moesha** | |
| 1998 | Khandi Alexander | NewsRadio | |
| 1998 | Penny Johnson Jerald | The Larry Sanders Show | |
| 1998 | T'Keyah Crystal Keymah | Cosby | |
| 1998 | Sheryl Lee Ralph | Moesha | |
1999
| 1999 | **Jackée Harry** | **Sister, Sister** | |
| 1999 | Whoopi Goldberg | The Nanny | |
| 1999 | T'Keyah Crystal Keymah | Cosby | |
| 1999 | Sheryl Lee Ralph | Moesha | |
| 1999 | Countess Vaughn | Moesha | |

=== 2000s ===
| Year | Actress | Series | Ref |
|---|---|---|---|
2000
| 2000 | **Rosa Parks** | **Touched by an Angel** | |
| 2000 | Sheryl Lee Ralph | Moesha | |
| 2000 | Wendy Raquel Robinson | The Steve Harvey Show | |
| 2000 | Countess Vaughn | Moesha | |
| 2000 | Terri J. Vaughn | The Steve Harvey Show | |
2001
| 2001 | **Terri J. Vaughn** | **The Steve Harvey Show** | |
| 2001 | Kim Coles | Frasier | |
| 2001 | Sheryl Lee Ralph | Moesha | |
| 2001 | Sandra Oh | Arliss | |
| 2001 | Hattie Winston | Becker | |
2002
| 2002 | **Terri J. Vaughn** | **The Steve Harvey Show** | |
| 2002 | Lisa Nicole Carson | Ally McBeal | |
| 2002 | Jennifer Holliday | Ally McBeal | |
| 2002 | Sheryl Lee Ralph | Moesha | |
| 2002 | Yvette Wilson | The Parkers | |
2003
| 2003 | **Terri J. Vaughn** | **The Steve Harvey Show** | |
| 2003 | Dee Dee Davis | The Bernie Mac Show | |
| 2003 | Regina Hall | Ally McBeal | |
| 2003 | Wendy Raquel Robinson | Cedric the Entertainer Presents | |
| 2003 | Camille Winbush | The Bernie Mac Show | |
2004
| 2004 | **Camille Winbush** | **The Bernie Mac Show** | |
| 2004 | Dee Dee Davis | The Bernie Mac Show | |
| 2004 | Telma Hopkins | Half & Half | |
| 2004 | Valarie Pettiford | Half & Half | |
| 2004 | Kyla Pratt | One on One | |
2005
| 2005 | **Camille Winbush** | **The Bernie Mac Show** | |
| 2005 | Essence Atkins | Half & Half | |
| 2005 | Telma Hopkins | Half & Half | |
| 2005 | Valarie Pettiford | Half & Half | |
| 2005 | Wanda Sykes | Curb Your Enthusiasm | |
2006
| 2006 | **Camille Winbush** | **The Bernie Mac Show** | |
| 2006 | Telma Hopkins | Half & Half | |
| 2006 | Valarie Pettiford | Half & Half | |
| 2006 | Kellita Smith | The Bernie Mac Show | |
| 2006 | Wanda Sykes | Curb Your Enthusiasm | |
2007
| 2007 | **Vanessa Williams** | **Ugly Betty** | |
| 2007 | Dee Dee Davis | The Bernie Mac Show | |
| 2007 | Whoopi Goldberg | Everybody Hates Chris | |
| 2007 | Telma Hopkins | Half & Half | |
| 2007 | LisaRaye McCoy | All of Us | |
2008
| 2008 | **Vanessa Williams** | **Ugly Betty** | |
| 2008 | Vivica A. Fox | Curb Your Enthusiasm | |
| 2008 | Tonye Patano | Weeds | |
| 2008 | Wendy Raquel Robinson | The Game | |
| 2008 | Keesha Sharp | Girlfriends | |
2009
| 2009 | **Keshia Knight Pulliam** | **Tyler Perry's House of Payne** | |
| 2009 | Tisha Campbell-Martin | Rita Rocks | |
| 2009 | Wendy Raquel Robinson | The Game | |
| 2009 | Wanda Sykes | The New Adventures of Old Christine | |
| 2009 | Vanessa Williams | Ugly Betty | |

=== 2010s ===
| Year | Actress | Series | Ref |
|---|---|---|---|
2010
| 2010 | **Keshia Knight Pulliam** | **Tyler Perry's House of Payne** | |
| 2010 | Tisha Campbell-Martin | Rita Rocks | |
| 2010 | Ana Ortiz | Ugly Betty | |
| 2010 | Wendy Raquel Robinson | The Game | |
| 2010 | Vanessa Williams | Ugly Betty | |
2011
| 2011 | **Sofía Vergara** | **Modern Family** | |
| 2011 | Viola Davis | United States of Tara | |
| 2011 | Anna Deavere Smith | Nurse Jackie | |
| 2011 | Keshia Knight Pulliam | Tyler Perry's House of Payne | |
| 2011 | Amber Riley | Glee | |
2012
| 2012 | **Keshia Knight Pulliam** | **Tyler Perry's House of Payne** | |
| 2012 | Amber Riley | Glee | |
| 2012 | Maya Rudolph | Up All Night | |
| 2012 | Gabourey Sidibe | The Big C | |
| 2012 | Sofía Vergara | Modern Family | |
2013
| 2013 | **Vanessa Williams** | **Desperate Housewives** | |
| 2013 | Anna Deavere Smith | Nurse Jackie | |
| 2013 | Rashida Jones | Parks and Recreation | |
| 2013 | Gladys Knight | The First Family | |
| 2013 | Gabourey Sidibe | The Big C | |
2014
| 2014 | **Brandy** | **The Game** | |
| 2014 | Anna Deavere Smith | Nurse Jackie | |
| 2014 | Rashida Jones | Parks and Recreation | |
| 2014 | Nia Long | House of Lies | |
| 2014 | Sofía Vergara | Modern Family | |
2015
| 2015 | **Yara Shahidi** | **Black-ish** | |
| 2015 | Laverne Cox | Orange Is the New Black | |
| 2015 | Adrienne C. Moore | Orange Is the New Black | |
| 2015 | Lorraine Toussaint | Orange Is the New Black | |
| 2015 | Sofía Vergara | Modern Family | |
2016
| 2016 | **Marsai Martin** | **Black-ish** | |
| 2016 | Tichina Arnold | Survivor's Remorse | |
| 2016 | Danielle Brooks | Orange Is the New Black | |
| 2016 | Laverne Cox | Orange Is the New Black | |
| 2016 | Anna Deavere Smith | Nurse Jackie | |
2017
| 2017 | **Adrienne C. Moore** | **Orange is the New Black** | |
| 2017 | Erica Ash | Survivor's Remorse | |
| 2017 | Laverne Cox | Orange is the New Black | |
| 2017 | Marsai Martin | Black-ish | |
| 2017 | Yvonne Orji | Insecure | |
2018
| 2018 | **Marsai Martin** | **Black-ish** | |
| 2018 | Leslie Jones | Saturday Night Live | |
| 2018 | Tichina Arnold | Survivor's Remorse | |
| 2018 | Uzo Aduba | Orange is the New Black | |
| 2018 | Yvonne Orji | Insecure | |
2019
| 2019 | **Marsai Martin** | **Black-ish** | |
| 2019 | Uzo Aduba | Orange is the New Black | |
| 2019 | Essence Atkins | Marlon | |
| 2019 | Yvonne Orji | Insecure | |
| 2019 | Natasha Rothwell | Insecure | |

=== 2020s ===
| Year | Actress | Series | Ref |
|---|---|---|---|
2020
| 2020 | **Marsai Martin** | **Black-ish** | |
| 2020 | Tichina Arnold | The Neighborhood | |
| 2020 | Halle Bailey | Grown-ish | |
| 2020 | Loretta Devine | Family Reunion | |
| 2020 | Regina Hall | Black Monday | |
2021
| 2021 | **Marsai Martin** | **Black-ish** | |
| 2021 | Tichina Arnold | The Neighborhood | |
| 2021 | Jenifer Lewis | Black-ish | |
| 2021 | Natasha Rothwell | Insecure | |
| 2021 | Yvonne Orji | Insecure | |
2022
| 2022 | **Natasha Rothwell** | **Insecure** | |
| 2022 | Jenifer Lewis | Black-ish | |
| 2022 | Marsai Martin | Black-ish | |
| 2022 | Amanda Seales | Insecure | |
| 2022 | Wanda Sykes | The Upshaws | |
2023
| 2023 | **Janelle James** | **Abbott Elementary** | |
| 2023 | Jenifer Lewis | Black-ish | |
| 2023 | Marsai Martin | Black-ish | |
| 2023 | Sheryl Lee Ralph | Abbott Elementary | |
| 2023 | Wanda Sykes | The Upshaws | |
2024
| 2024 | **Ayo Edebiri** | **The Bear** | |
| 2024 | Ego Nwodim | Saturday Night Live | |
| 2024 | Janelle James | Abbott Elementary | |
| 2024 | Sheryl Lee Ralph | Abbott Elementary | |
| 2024 | Shoniqua Shandai | Harlem | |
2025
| 2025 | **Danielle Pinnock** | **Ghosts** | |
| 2025 | Ego Nwodim | Saturday Night Live | |
| 2025 | Janelle James | Abbott Elementary | |
| 2025 | Sheryl Lee Ralph | Abbott Elementary | |
| 2025 | Wanda Sykes | The Upshaws | |

== Multiple wins and nominations ==
=== Wins ===
5 wins

- Marsai Martin

3 wins

- Keshia Knight Pulliam
- Terri J. Vaughn
- Vanessa Williams
- Camille Winbush

2 wins

- Tichina Arnold
- Jackée Harry

=== Nominations ===
8 nominations

- Marsai Martin

5 nominations

- Sheryl Lee Ralph

5 nominations

- Tichina Arnold
- Wendy Raquel Robinson
- Wanda Sykes
- Vanessa Williams

4 nominations

- Anna Deavere Smith
- Telma Hopkins
- Yvonne Orji
- Keshia Knight Pulliam
- Terri J. Vaughn
- Sofía Vergara
- Camille Winbush

3 nominations

- Laverne Cox
- Dee Dee Davis
- Jenifer Lewis
- Valarie Pettiford
- Natasha Rothwell
- Countess Vaughn

2 nominations

- Uzo Aduba
- Tisha Campbell-Martin
- Kim Coles
- Whoopi Goldberg
- Regina Hall
- Jackée Harry
- Rashida Jones
- T'Keyah Crystal Keymah
- Nia Long
- Amber Riley
- Gabourey Sidibe
