= Marsai Martin =

American actress (born 2004)

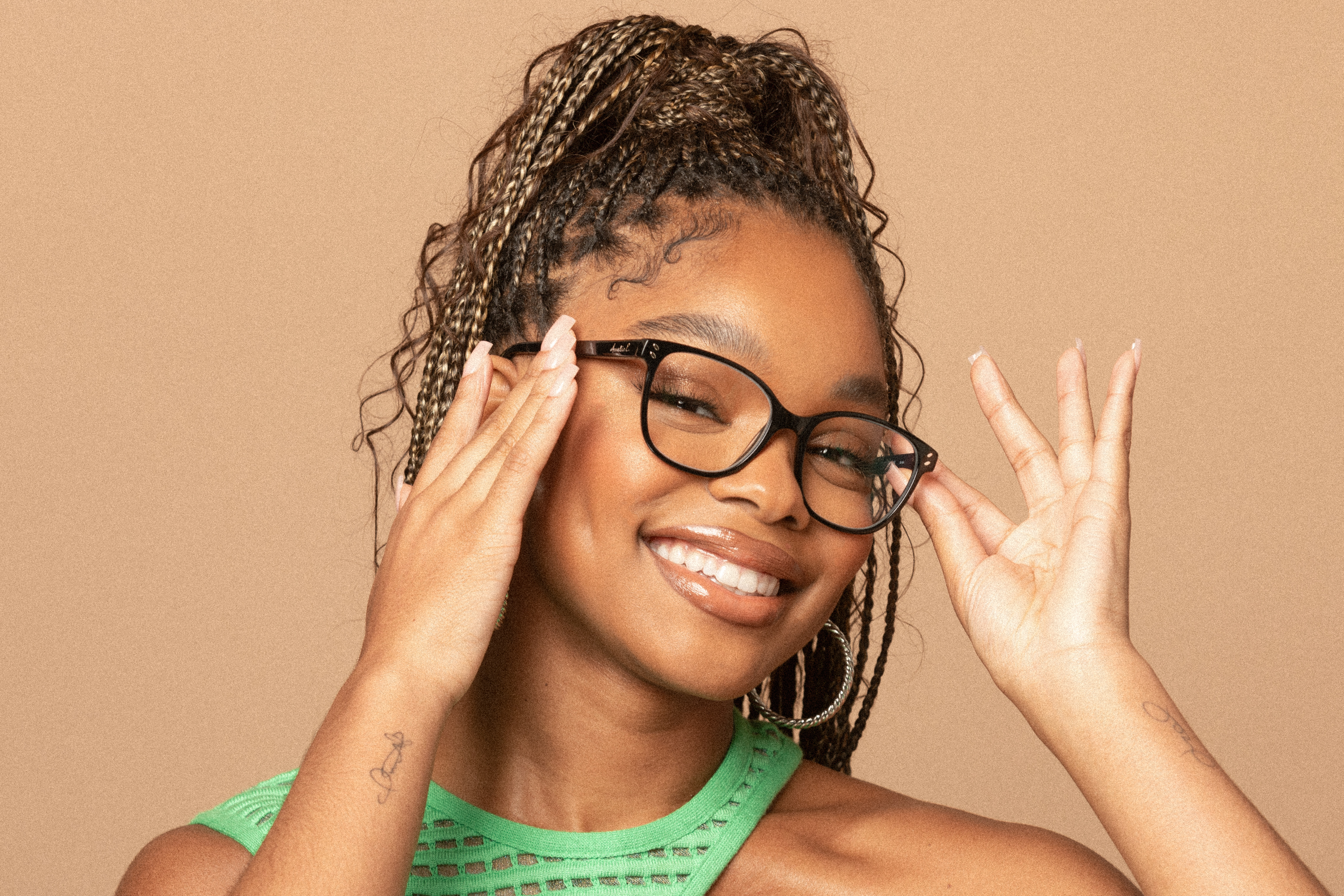
- Martin speaking at the White House in 2024
- Born: Caila Marsai Martin; August 14, 2004 (age 22); Plano, Texas, U.S.
- Occupations: Actress; producer
- Years active: 2014–present
- Partner: Rajah Caruth (2023–present)
- Website: marsai.com

Signature
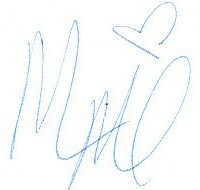

Caila Marsai Martin (/ˈmɑːrseɪ/ MAR-say; born August 14, 2004) is an American actress and producer, best known for her role as Diane Johnson on the ABC sitcom Black-ish (2014–2022). In 2019, Martin had a starring role in the comedy film Little, which she also produced at the age of 14. Due to her work on this film, Martin holds the Guinness World Record as the youngest Hollywood executive producer. Time magazine named her on its "Time 100 Next" the year of its release. In 2022, she produced and starred in the sports comedy film, Fantasy Football.

== Early life ==
Caila Marsai Martin was born on August 14, 2004, in Plano, Texas to Carol and Joshua Martin. Martin's acting career was launched with a glamour pictorial, in which the photographer gave Martin's parents a discount in exchange for her father's promise that he would submit the photos to talent agencies. The photos were sent out to four agencies and one immediately signed her. At age five, Martin landed her first national commercial for Choice Hotel. Her family then moved to Los Angeles in 2013, so she could pursue an acting career.

== Career ==
=== 2014–2015: Career beginnings ===
In 2014, Martin was cast as Diane Johnson, the daughter of Andre (Anthony Anderson) and Rainbow Johnson (Tracee Ellis Ross) on the ABC sitcom Black-ish, created by Kenya Barris. For her breakthrough role, Martin has received numerous awards and nominations, including three NAACP Image Awards for Outstanding Supporting Actress in a Comedy Series and a Young Artist Award. She has received six NAACP Image Awards nominations and two Screen Actors Guild Award for Outstanding Performance by an Ensemble in a Comedy Series.

=== 2016–2019: Breakthrough with An American Girl Story and Little ===
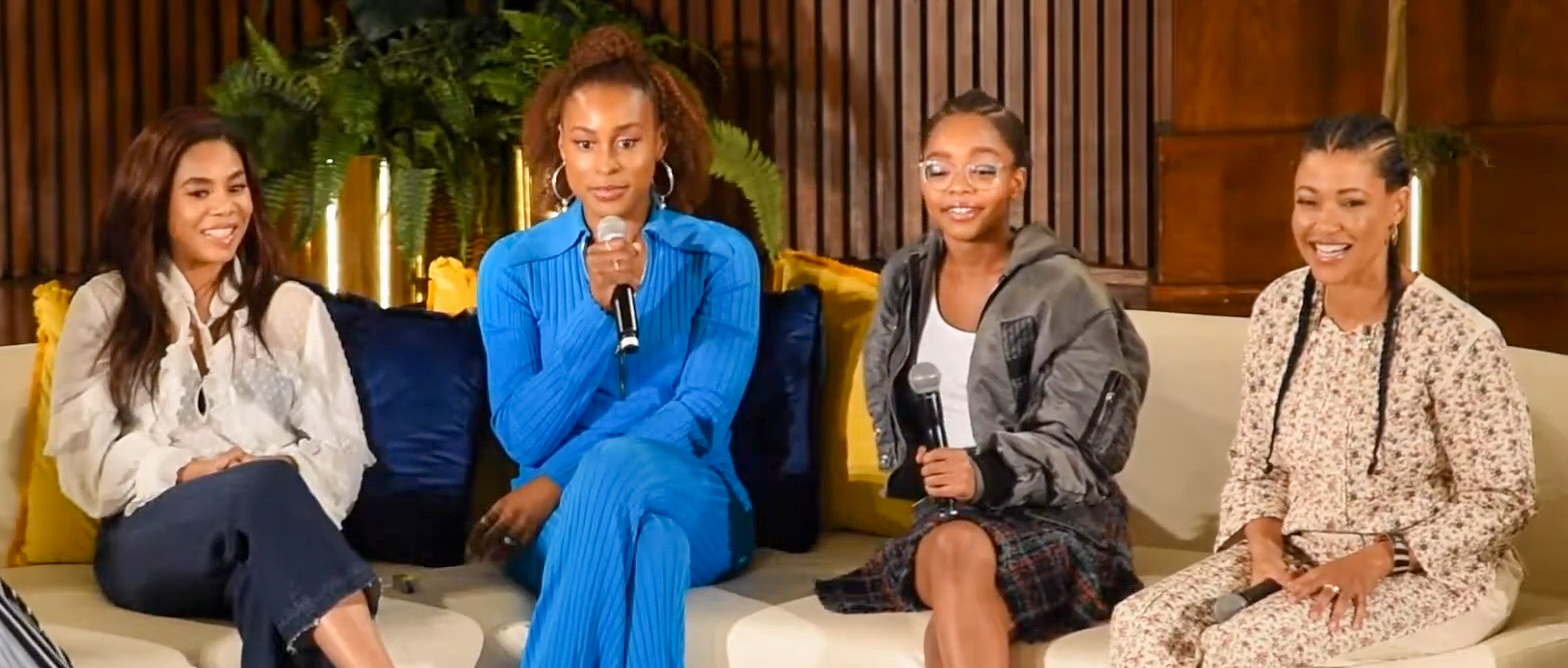
Martin (second from right) with her Little co-stars Regina Hall and Issa Rae and director Tina Gordon

In 2016, Martin made her film debut, playing a leading role in the Amazon Studios original film An American Girl Story – Melody 1963: Love Has to Win, set in Detroit during the Civil Rights Movement. That same year, she did a voice role for the movie Nina, which tells the life story of American artist and activist Nina Simone. In 2019, Martin starred in her first studio feature film, the comedy Little, for Universal Pictures. At the age of 13, she became executive producer of the film, making her the youngest person to ever produce a movie, as well as the youngest African-American producer.

In February 2019, Genius Productions, Martin's company, signed a first-look production deal with Universal. Martin's first film as part of the deal is StepMonster, a comedy about a teenage girl who is adjusting to life with a new stepmother. She is the youngest person to get a first-look deal at Universal, and the youngest person to get a deal at any studio. In May 2019, it was announced Martin would be producing and starring in the film adaptation of Amari and the Night Brothers for Universal Pictures. In December 2019, it was announced that Martin would be producing the comedy film Queen.

=== 2020–present: PAW Patrol: The Movie and The Masked Singer ===
She voiced the character Liberty in the 2021 film PAW Patrol: The Movie and the 2023 sequel film PAW Patrol: The Mighty Movie. In April 2022, it was announced that Martin would star alongside Kelly Rowland and Omari Hardwick in the comedy film Fantasy Football. In 2023, she produced Saturdays, a coming-of-age comedy television series for Disney Channel. The show was canceled after one season. In 2024, Martin competed in season twelve of The Masked Singer as "Woodpecker" where Jenifer Lewis (who portrayed "Miss Cleocatra" back in season eleven) served as her Mask Ambassador. She was eliminated in the Group A finals alongside Paula Cole as "Ship". On June 16, 2026, it was announced that Martin would be one of the performers at the Barack Obama Presidential Center opening on June 18 in Chicago.

== Personal life ==
Martin is currently in a relationship with NASCAR driver Rajah Caruth.

== Filmography ==
=== Film ===
Year	Title	Role	Notes
2016	Nina	Young Girl on Tape	
2016	An American Girl Story – Melody 1963: Love Has to Win	Melody Ellison	Direct-to-video
2017	Fun Mom Dinner	Hannah	
2017	Lemonade Mafia	Kira Anderson	Short film
2019	Little	Young Jordan Sanders	Also executive producer
2021	Spirit Untamed	Prudence "Pru" Granger (voice)	
2021	Paw Patrol: The Movie	Liberty (voice)	
2022	Fantasy Football	Callie Coleman	Also producer
2023	Paw Patrol: The Mighty Movie	Liberty (voice)	
2023	Good Burger 2	Friendly Customer	
2025	G20	Serena Sutton	

=== Television ===
Year	Title	Role	Notes
2014–2022	Black-ish	Diane Johnson	Main role
2015–2016	Goldie & Bear	Jill (voice)	4 episodes
2016	The Mr. Peabody & Sherman Show	Anissa (voice)	2 episodes
2016–2019	Elena of Avalor	Caterina (voice)	2 episodes
2018	Unbreakable Kimmy Schmidt	Aisha	Episode: "Kimmy and the Beest"
2019	Mixed-ish	Diane Johnson	Episode: "Becoming Bow"
2019	A Black Lady Sketch Show	Reniece	Episode: "Born at Night, But Not Last Night"
2019–2020	Vampirina	Frankie Bolt (voice)	2 episodes
2019–2022	DreamWorks Dragons: Rescue Riders	Aggro (voice)	Main role
2022	Wild 'n Out	Herself	1 episode
2022	The Proud Family: Louder and Prouder	Iyanna (voice)	Episode: "Get In"
2022	The Hair Tales	Herself	
2023	Saturdays	—N/a	Executive producer
2024	Good Times: Black Again	Grey (voice)	Main role
2024	Lego Star Wars: Rebuild the Galaxy	Yesi Scala (voice)	Main role
2024	The Masked Singer	Herself/Woodpecker	Season 12 contestant

== Accolades ==
Association	Year	Category	Nominated work	Result	Ref.
BET Awards	2017	YoungStars Award	Black-ish, Melody 1963: Love Has to Win	Nominated	
BET Awards	2018	YoungStars Award	Black-ish, Melody 1963: Love Has to Win	Nominated	
BET Awards	2019	YoungStars Award	Black-ish	Won	
BET Awards	2020	YoungStars Award	Black-ish	Won	
BET Awards	2022	YoungStars Award	Black-ish	Won	
BET Awards	2023	YoungStars Award	Black-ish	Won	
Black Reel Awards	2019	Outstanding Supporting Actress, Comedy Series	Black-ish	Nominated	
Black Reel Awards	2022	Outstanding Voice Performance	Spirit Untamed	Nominated	
MTV Movie & TV Awards	2019	Best Comedic Performance	Little	Nominated	
NAACP Image Awards	2016	Outstanding Performance by a Youth (Series, Special, Television Movie or Mini-series)	Black-ish	Nominated	
NAACP Image Awards	2016	Outstanding Supporting Actress in a Comedy Series	Black-ish	Won	
NAACP Image Awards	2017	Outstanding Performance by a Youth (Series, Special, Television Movie or Mini-series)	Black-ish	Nominated	
NAACP Image Awards	2017	Outstanding Supporting Actress in a Comedy Series	Black-ish	Won	
NAACP Image Awards	2018	Outstanding Performance by a Youth (Series, Special, Television Movie or Mini-series)	Black-ish	Nominated	
NAACP Image Awards	2018	Outstanding Supporting Actress in a Comedy Series	Black-ish	Won	
NAACP Image Awards	2019	Outstanding Performance by a Youth (Series, Special, Television Movie or Mini-series)	Black-ish	Won	
NAACP Image Awards	2019	Outstanding Supporting Actress in a Comedy Series	Black-ish	Won	
NAACP Image Awards	2020	Outstanding Performance by a Youth (Series, Special, Television Movie or Mini-series)	Black-ish	Won	
NAACP Image Awards	2020	Outstanding Supporting Actress in a Comedy Series	Black-ish	Won	
NAACP Image Awards	2020	Outstanding Supporting Actress in a Motion Picture	Little	Won	
NAACP Image Awards	2020	Outstanding Breakthrough Performance in Motion Picture	Little	Won	
Screen Actors Guild Awards	2017	Outstanding Performance by an Ensemble in a Comedy Series	Black-ish	Nominated	
Screen Actors Guild Awards	2018	Outstanding Performance by an Ensemble in a Comedy Series	Black-ish	Nominated	
Shorty Awards	2019	Phenom Award – Entertainment	Herself	Won	
Young Artist Award	2015	Best Performance in a TV Series – Supporting Young Actress	Black-ish	Nominated	
Young Artist Award	2016	Best Performance in a TV Series – Supporting Young Actress	Black-ish	Nominated	
Young Artist Award	2016	Outstanding Young Ensemble Cast in a Television Series	Black-ish	Nominated	
Teen Choice Awards	2019	Choice Movie Actress – Comedy	Little	Nominated	
