= Camille Winbush =

American actress and singer (born 1989/1990)

- Born: Camile Simoine Winbush; 1989 or 1990 (age 36–37); Culver City, California, U.S.
- Occupations: Actress, singer
- Years active: 1994–present

Camille Simoine Winbush (born 1989 or 1990) is an American actress and singer, best known for her roles as Emma Aimes on short-lived sitcom Minor Adjustments, Vanessa "Nessa" Thomkins on The Bernie Mac Show and as Lauren Treacy on the popular teen drama The Secret Life of the American Teenager. Her work in television has earned her three Image Awards and a Young Artist Award.

== Early life ==
Winbush was born in Culver City, California, the only child of Anthony and Alice Winbush. She never attended public school, having been homeschooled and educated by an on-set tutor while acting as a child. Winbush was a competitive gymnast during her childhood.

== Career ==
Discovered by a talent scout at age 2, Winbush made her acting debut on television series Viper in 1994, playing the role of Lucy Wilkes. The following year, she acted in her first film, Dangerous Minds. She appeared regularly on sitcom Minor Adjustments (1995−96) as Emma Aimes, the daughter of Rondell Sheridan's character. Winbush reprised her role of Emma on Brotherly Love in a Halloween episode.

She portrayed a young girl named Camille in Eraser (1996) and appeared as Pearline, a bookworm, in Ghost Dog: The Way of the Samurai (1999). Winbush had a recurring role on 7th Heaven and provided the voice of Ashley Tomossian on the Disney cartoon Recess.

Winbush's big break came in 2001 when she was cast as Vanessa Thomkins on The Bernie Mac Show, a role she would play until the series ended in 2006. During her run on the show Winbush earned numerous award nominations for her role, winning three NAACP Image Awards for Outstanding Supporting Actress in a Comedy Series and a Young Artist Award for Best Performance in a TV Series (Comedy or Drama) – Leading Young Actress in 2006.

She has guest starred on Strong Medicine, Criminal Minds, That's Life, The Norm Show, NYPD Blue, and Any Day Now. In 2007, she appeared in an episode of Grey's Anatomy. Winbush acted in Disney's musical production of Geppetto.

From 2008 to 2013, Winbush played Lauren Treacy, a recurring character in The Secret Life of the American Teenager. Winbush was cast as Miriam in the web series The Choir, replacing Idara Victor in the role. She provided the voice of Rhonda in Children of Ether and portrayed Syrena in Cannon Busters, both productions by animator LeSean Thomas.

=== Other ventures ===
In 2002, Winbush recorded "One Small Voice" featuring singers Myra and Taylor Momsen and "The Night Before Christmas Song" for the compilation album School's Out! Christmas. She also sang on the soundtrack of the Disney musical production of Geppetto.

As a teenager, Winbush operated an ice cream shop she named Baked Ice, located in Pasadena, California. It opened in 2003 and an aunt supervised the store when Winbush was unavailable. She received a Teenpreneur Award from Black Enterprise in 2004. The business was still extant as of 2005.

In February 2021, Winbush started an OnlyFans account.

== Filmography ==
Year	Title	Role	Notes
1994	Viper	Lucy Wilkes	Three episodes: "Pilot", "Ghosts", "Thief of Hearts"
1995	CBS Schoolbreak Special	April Balck	Episode: "What About Your Friends"
1995	Dangerous Minds	Tyeisha Roberts	
1995	Minor Adjustments	Emma Aimes	20 episodes
1995	Brotherly Love	Emma Aimes	Episode: "Witchcraft"
1996	Eraser	Camille	
1996–1999	7th Heaven	Lynn Hamilton	Six episodes
1997	Happily Ever After: Fairy Tales for Every Child	The Girl	Episode: "Mother Goose: A Rappin' & Rhymin' Special"
1997	Hangin' with Mr. Cooper	Lil Hot Foot	Episode: "Please Don't Go"
1998	NYPD Blue	Chloe	Episode: "Honeymoon at Viagra Falls"
1999	Ghost Dog: The Way of the Samurai	Pearline	
1999	Ladies Man	Girl Scout #2	Money, Honey
1999	Any Day Now	Mavis	Episode: "A Parent's Job"
1999–2000	Recess	Ashley 'Ashley T' Tomossian	Four episodes
2000	Geppetto	Featured	TV
2000	Dinosaur	Female Lemur	voice
2000	The Norm Show	Molly	Episode:"Norm vs. Halloween"
2000	The Tangerine Bear: Home in Time for Christmas!	Bear #3/Little Girl	voice
2001–2006	The Bernie Mac Show	Vanessa "Nessa" Thomkins	104 episodes
2003	Strong Medicine	Vinetta	Episode: "Emergency Contact"
2005	ER	Trisha	Episode: "Skin"
2007	Criminal Minds	Ally	Episode: "Fear and Loathing"
2007	Grey's Anatomy	Camille Travis	Episode: "The Heart of the Matter"
2008–2013	The Secret Life of the American Teenager	Lauren Treacy	recurring role
2015	The Choir	Miriam	Four episodes
2017	Children of Ether	Rhonda Vega	voice
2019	Cannon Busters	Syrena, Additional Voices	English dub
2022	Holiday Hideaway	Carly	

== Awards and nominations ==
Awards
Year	Result	Award	Category	Nominated work
1996	Nominated	Young Artist Awards	Best Performance by an Actress Under 10: Television	Minor Adjustments
2003	Nominated	Image Awards	Outstanding Supporting Actress in a Comedy Series	The Bernie Mac Show
2003	Nominated	Prism Awards	Performance in a Comedy Series	The Bernie Mac Show
2004	Nominated	BET Comedy Awards	Outstanding Supporting Actress in a Comedy Series	The Bernie Mac Show
2004	Won	Image Awards	Outstanding Supporting Actress in a Comedy Series	The Bernie Mac Show
2005	Nominated	BET Comedy Awards	Outstanding Supporting Actress in a Comedy Series	The Bernie Mac Show
2005	Won	Image Awards	Outstanding Supporting Actress in a Comedy Series	The Bernie Mac Show
2006	Won	Image Awards	Outstanding Supporting Actress in a Comedy Series	The Bernie Mac Show
2006	Won	Young Artist Awards	Best Performance in a TV Series (Comedy or Drama): Leading Young Actress	The Bernie Mac Show
