= Karon Riley =

American football player (born 1978)

No. 95, 51, 92, 91
- Position: DE/LB/OL

Personal information
- Born: August 23, 1978 (age 48); Detroit, Michigan, U.S.
- Listed height: 6 ft 2 in (1.88 m)
- Listed weight: 265 lb (120 kg)

Career information
- High school: Martin Luther King (Detroit)
- College: Southern Methodist/Minnesota
- NFL draft: 2001: 4th round, 103rd overall pick

Career history
- Chicago Bears (2001); Atlanta Falcons (2002–2004); Toronto Argonauts (2005); Washington Redskins (2006)*; Las Vegas/Cleveland Gladiators (2007–2008)
- * Offseason or practice squad member only

Awards and highlights
- Big Ten Co-Defensive Lineman of the Year (2000); 2× First-team All-Big Ten (1999, 2000)

Career NFL statistics
- Games played: 25
- Games started: 0
- Tackles: 7
- Fumble recoveries: 1
- Stats at Pro Football Reference

Career CFL statistics
- Games played: 2

Career AFL statistics
- Tackles: 47
- Sacks: 8.5
- Forced fumbles: 6
- Fumble recoveries: 2
- Stats at ArenaFan.com

Karon Joseph Riley (born August 23, 1978) is an American former professional football player who was a defensive lineman in the National Football League (NFL), Canadian Football League (CFL) and Arena Football League (AFL). He was selected by the Chicago Bears in the 2001 NFL draft. Riley played college football for the SMU Mustangs and Minnesota Golden Gophers. He is now a television actor and producer.

== Early life ==
At Martin Luther King High School in Detroit, Michigan, Riley starred in football, basketball, and track&field. As a senior, in football, he was an All-City choice, an All-Metro choice, and an All-State choice.

== Professional career ==
Riley entered the National Football League by being selected by the Chicago Bears in the 4th round (103rd overall pick) of the 2001 NFL draft out of the University of Minnesota. He played with the Bears in 2001 and the Atlanta Falcons (2003-2004).

In 2005, he played two games in the Canadian Football League with the Toronto Argonauts.

On January 30, 2006, Riley signed with the Redskins as an unrestricted free agent but was released on August 28, 2006

Riley played two seasons in the Arena Football League with the Las Vegas/Cleveland Gladiators (2007–2008) as an offensive lineman/defensive lineman. On August 8, 2008, Riley was removed from the Gladiators roster and reassigned to the Arena Football 1 League office.

== Acting career ==
Riley has appeared in a few films and television shows since 2010 including Tyler Perry's Meet the Browns, 35 and Ticking, The Last Punch, Last Call, Mann & Wife and the 2019 film Little.

In 2019, Riley appeared in a recurring role on Bounce TV soap opera-drama Saints & Sinners. He was the first replacement made in the series recast as the character Malik Thompson, previously portrayed by Anthony Dalton in 2018. Riley has starred as main character Malcolm in the hit series "The Black Hamptons" since 2022.

He is also a film producer, in which his credits include two films.

== Personal life ==
Riley is married to actress Terri J. Vaughn and on April 24, 2008, Vaughn welcomed their first child, a son named Kal'El Joseph Riley.

== Filmography ==
=== Film ===
Year	Title	Role	Notes
2010	This Time	Malcolm	Short
2011	35 and Ticking	Roderick	
2012	A Cross to Bear	Trey	TV movie
2013	Between Sisters	Sheldon	TV movie
2013	A Christmas Blessing	Oscar	TV movie
2013	Marry Me for Christmas	Blair	TV movie
2014	Where's the Love?	Dale	TV movie
2014	Lyfe's Journey	Rob White	TV movie
2014	Marry Us for Christmas	Blair	TV movie
2015	Blaq Gold	Grail Jacobs	TV movie
2015	A Baby for Christmas	Blair	TV movie
2016	The Last Punch	Muhammad Ali	
2016	Merry Christmas, Baby	Blair	TV movie
2016	Beat Street	Prince	Video
2017	When Love Kills: The Falicia Blakely Story	Robert	TV movie
2018	Gentrification	Michael Shields	
2018	Breakthrough	Officer Lorenzo Daryl	
2018	The Mothers	Officer Bentley	Short
2018	Chandler Christmas Getaway	Blair	TV movie
2018	The Morning After: Part One	Michael	
2018	Coins for Christmas	Jake	TV movie
2018	Related Destiny	Chico	Short
2019	Thirty	Javon	Short
2019	Little	Tony	
2019	The Waiting Room	Steven	
2019	His, Hers & the Truth	Xavier	
2020	Coins for Love	Jake	TV movie
2020	Vault of Terrors	David	Short
2020	Pinch	Simon Ross	
2021	Stick Me Up	Thomas	
2021	Liam White: The Forgettable Life of Liam White	Chris	
2021	The Holiday Switch	Jay Rich	
2021	Letters from the Bottle	Amos Naphish	
2022	The Love We Had	Corey Wright	
2022	Red Winter	Jerrod	
2022	Stronger	Jarrod	
2022	Out of Anger	Alex	
2022	Single Not Searching	Rodney	
2022	The Holiday Stocking	Wilson Whitlock	TV movie
2022	Eighteen	Gerald Harris	
2023	It's Lonely at the Top	Kane	
2023	Once Upon a Time in the District	Demond	
2023	Praise This	Bartender Rob	
2023	It's Lonely at the Top II	Kane	
2023	A Mother's Intuition	Alphonso	
2023	The Comeback	Calvin	
2023	Christmas at the Frat House	Keith	
2024	Vampire's House of Cain	Hanson	
2025	Careful What You Ask For!	Kev	
2025	South Haven	Nate	
2025	Broad Day	Agent Blanco	

=== Television ===
Year	Title	Role	Notes
2010	Meet the Browns	Medic	Episode: "Meet the Cheating Liver"
2012	Single Ladies	Baller	Episode: "Eat, Play, Love"
2012	Boulevard West	Malachi	Main Cast
2013	Necessary Roughness	Damani Jensen	Episode: "The Fall Guy"
2013	Walking with Gods	Detective John Marcus	Main Cast
2013	Love Thy Neighbor	Marty	Episode: "The Black Tie Affair"
2017	Mann & Wife	James	Episode: "Mann in Charge"
2018	Insatiable	Chase	Episode: "Pilot"
2018	The Pre-Quarter Life Crisis	Mykell	Episode: "Super Lit"
2019	Last Call	Julian	Episode: "Bird & The Beast"
2019	American Soul	Corporal Siprian	Episode: "Continuous Revolution in Progress"
2019	Ambitions	Roderick	Recurring Cast
2019	BET Her Presents: The Waiting Room	Steven	Episode: "The Waiting Room"
2021	The Bottom	Reggie	Main Cast
2021	Saints & Sinners	Malik Thompson	Recurring Cast: Season 5
2022	Twisted	Darnell	Episode: "Long Day"
2022–24	The Black Hamptons	Malcom Britton	Main Cast
2023–24	Wicked City	The Handler	Main Cast: Season 1, Guest: Season 2
2025	She the People	Michael	Recurring Cast
