= List of All of Us episodes =

All of Us is an American sitcom television series that premiered on UPN network on September 16, 2003. The series aired on UPN for its first three seasons, airing its final episode on UPN on May 15, 2006. On October 1, 2006, the show moved to The CW, a new network formed by the merger of UPN and The WB, where it aired for fourth and final season; the last episode aired on May 14, 2007, and the series was cancelled by The CW on May 15, 2007. Warner Bros. Television produced this series. A total of 88 episodes aired over the four seasons.

== Series overview ==
Season	Episodes	Originally released		
Season	Episodes	First released	Last released	Network
1	22	September 16, 2003	May 18, 2004	UPN
2	22	September 21, 2004	May 24, 2005	UPN
3	22	September 19, 2005	May 15, 2006	UPN
4	22	October 1, 2006	May 14, 2007	The CW

== Episodes ==
=== Season 1 (2003–04) ===
No. overall	No. in season	Title	Directed by	Written by	Original release date	Prod. code	Viewers (millions)
1	1	"Pilot"	Stan Lathan	Story by : Jada Pinkett Smith & Will Smith & Betsy Borns; Teleplay by : Betsy Borns	September 16, 2003	475369	4.67
Entertainment reporter Robert James has to raise his son and deal with both the demands of his ex-wife and also those of his current girlfriend. In the opener, he gets the divorce papers to end one marriage and also tries to start up another by asking his son if he can marry Tia.
2	2	"Birthdaze"	Stan Lathan	Warren Lieberstein & Halsted Sullivan	September 23, 2003	176902	4.42
The competition heats up between Neesee and Tia, who try to out-do each other by planning separate birthday parties for Bobby Jr., so Robert attempts to increase the peace between the women and bring everyone together for one big birthday bash. Bobby gets his hopes up that they might get back together after he sees them getting on with each other. Guest stars: Debi Mazar, Jaden Smith, Trey Smith
3	3	"Here Comes the Bride"	Stan Lathan	Dan Signer	September 30, 2003	176901	4.70
When Robert invites Tia to move into his closet space, she gets jealous when she discovers his old wedding video showing a happy Robert with his now ex-wife Neesee. Meanwhile, a misunderstanding about which videotape Tia actually found gives Neesee leverage in a battle with Robert over who gets custody of Bobby's Jr.'s old crib.
4	4	"Kindergarten Confidential"	Stan Lathan	Lori Lakin	October 7, 2003	176904	4.07
Tia finds that she can't escape Robert's ex-wife, Neesee, even in her own workplace, when Neesee volunteers to be the school's newest kindergarten "room mom" and forms an instant bond with Tia's best friend, Jonelle. Meanwhile, R&B sensation and movie star Beyoncé Knowles turns the tables on Robert during an interview when she starts asking him personal questions. Guest star: Beyoncé Knowles
5	5	"Say My Name, Say My Name"	Stan Lathan	Jared Bush	October 14, 2003	176903	3.71
After Tia uses Neesee's maiden name when forging her signature on one of Bobby Jr.'s permission slips, Neesee reveals that she intends to keep Robert's last name even though they're officially divorced.
6	6	"Uncle Marcus Comes to Dinner"	Stan Lathan	Jada Pinkett Smith & Will Smith & Betsy Borns	October 21, 2003	176905	3.95
When Neesee begins dating a handsome dentist, Robert becomes jealous, but claims his concern is for Bobby Jr. Guest star: Boris Kodjoe
7	7	"Spatial Profiling"	Stan Lathan	Dan Signer	November 4, 2003	176906	3.77
When the station does a profile on Robert's home life, he insists that both Tia and Neesee be included, but when Neesee is edited out of the version that airs, the kids at Bobby's Jr.'s school joke that Neesee must be the nanny. Meanwhile, Neesee retaliates by filing a complaint that Tia and Robert's relationship is in violation of the rule against teachers dating students' parents.
8	8	"Tia Moves In"	Stan Lathan	Michael Soccio	November 11, 2003	176907	3.71
Tia moves into the house with Robert only to discover that Bobby Jr. doesn't want her there, so when Robert and Dirk fail at making Bobby Jr. feel more comfortable with the new living arrangements, it's up to Neesee to try to help her son adjust. Meanwhile, Jonelle sublets Tia's old apartment and becomes friends with the neighbors who did not like Tia.
9	9	"Johnny Comes Marching Home"	Stan Lathan	Betsy Borns	November 18, 2003	176909	4.98
When Johnny, a recently divorced college friend of Robert, Dirk and Neesee's, comes to town, sparks fly after he and Neesee share a kiss, but Robert isn't happy to learn that Johnny and Neesee want to take things to the next level. Guest stars: Debi Mazar, Jaden Smith, Trey Smith, Will Smith
10	10	"Out of the Picture"	Debbie Allen	Kipp Marcus	November 25, 2003	176908	3.72
Now that they're living together, Robert and Tia worry that Bobby Jr. may have actually witnessed them having sex, and to make matters worse, they believe that Bobby Jr. has drawn a picture of what he saw and fear that he may show it to Neesee.
11	11	"I Saw Tia Kissing Santa Claus"	Stan Lathan	Warren Lieberstein & Halsted Sullivan	December 16, 2003	176912	3.98
Bobby Jr. catches his dad, who's decked out like St. Nick, in a kiss with Tia—and comes away believing his dad is the real Santa. Also, Tia's relationship with her visiting dad becomes strained.
12	12	"Catering"	Stan Lathan	Jared Bush	January 13, 2004	176910	3.62
Neesee contemplates quitting her burgeoning catering career when Bobby Jr. begins to act out both at home and at the TV station. Meanwhile, Dirk is surprised when he falls not for a sexy superstar, but for her lawyer. Guest stars: Debi Mazar, Jaden Smith
13	13	"Used ta Be My Girl"	Stan Lathan	Stacy A. Littlejohn	January 27, 2004	176911	3.29
Larry, one of Tia's closest friends from childhood, pays Tia a visit which unsettles Robert when Larry admits that he wishes he was marrying Tia. Things go from bad to worse when Larry explains why. Meanwhile, Neesee and Alex take over Robert's kitchen. Guest stars: Debi Mazar, Allen Payne
14	14	"Boxing"	Debbie Allen	Jewel Wormley	February 10, 2004	176915	3.16
Neesee is furious when she finds out that Robert has taught their son to box. Meanwhile, Alex tries a few moves on her trainer, and Tia learns that Jonelle hasn't been paying her rent. Guest stars: Debi Mazar, Jaden Smith, Sugar Shane Mosley
15	15	"Johnny Come Lately"	Debbie Allen	Story by : Stacy A. Littlejohn; Teleplay by : Betsy Borns	February 17, 2004	176916	3.87
16	16	"Johnny Come Lately"	Debbie Allen	Story by : Dan Signer; Teleplay by : Mark Legan	February 17, 2004	176917	3.87
Part 1: Robert's college buddy Johnny returns to visit Neesee. Tia later asks Robert how he feels about Johnny and Neesee's relationship. He doesn't mind and offers to take the newly couple out to dinner. After a fun-filled evening, Johnny decides to take everyone out on a road trip to Las Vegas. Part 2: The gang decides to go on a road trip with Dirk and Jonelle in tow. Jonelle assists that Turtle look after Bobby while they're gone. Later, Neesee proposes to Johnny but the newly engaged couple is too scared to tell Robert whom isn't okay with it at all. Guest star: Will Smith
17	17	"O Brother, Where Art Thou?"	Debbie Allen	Ray Lancon	February 24, 2004	176918	3.66
Dirk's estranged brother reveals he has had a sex-change operation. Meanwhile, Robert's mother collapses during a visit. Guest stars: Patti LaBelle, Tyra Banks
18	18	"A Family Affair"	Debbie Allen	Stacy A. Littlejohn	March 2, 2004	176919	3.73
When Robert turns down his sister Carmen's latest "get-rich-quick" scheme, she pleads her case to Tia, who decides to help her, but accidentally gives Carmen money that was intended for Bobby Jr., so when Neesee's child support check bounces, a furious Neesee lets everyone know about it. Meanwhile, Dirk and Jonelle try to start a romance. Guest star: Tisha Campbell-Martin
19	19	"Wedding Dance"	Debbie Allen	Lori Lakin	March 30, 2004	176913	2.98
Although Tia wants to have their wedding on the beach or on a mountaintop, Robert is convinced that she really wants an expensive shindig. So, to make extra money to pay for it, he appears in a TV commercial for a car dealership. Meanwhile, Bobby gives a girl he likes Neesee's old engagement ring.
20	20	"Thirty Candles"	Alfonso Ribeiro	Michael Soccio	May 4, 2004	176914	2.73
Robert doesn't realize he has completely forgotten Tia's birthday until Neesee and Bobby arrive with a present, so he enlists Neesee's help to cater and pull together a party that's a surprise for everyone involved. Sure that Robert hasn't forgotten her birthday, Tia anticipates his surprise, but certainly doesn't expect getting stuck in the car while Robert reports on a stuntman-union strike.
21	21	"Playdate"	Debbie Allen	Mark Legan	May 11, 2004	176920	3.12
When Robert and Neesee learn that Bobby doesn't socialize with the other kids in his school, they immediately book a playdate for Bobby with the most popular kid in class, Sammy, but things get awkward when Sammy's mom Traci comes on strong to Robert right in his own house. Meanwhile, after discovering that Bobby's shyness stems from a fight with Alex's son, Neesee and Alex attempt to reconcile the boys' friendship, but end up arguing over whose son should apologize first. Guest stars: Debi Mazar, Nicole Ari Parker
22	22	"It Takes Three to Tango"	Debbie Allen	Betsy Borns	May 18, 2004	176921	2.73
Close to the wedding date, Robert and Tia start having vivid nightmares involving Neesee, making Tia realize that spending the rest of her life with Robert also means spending the rest of her life with Neesee, causing her to re-examine her relationship with Robert. Tensions at home affect the tired couple, putting them out of sync at the gang's tango lessons, taught by Antonio.

=== Season 2 (2004–05) ===
No. overall	No. in season	Title	Directed by	Written by	Original release date	Prod. code	Viewers (millions)
23	1	"Reunited and It Doesn't Feel That Good"	Debbie Allen	Arthur Harris	September 21, 2004	2T5651	2.73
Tia tries to explain why she needs some space, Robert successfully seduces her, thinking their problems are solved only to be disappointed the next morning when Tia tells him nothing has changed. But when Neesee attempts to get Robert and Tia back together, her plan backfires, not realizing that she is the reason for their separation. Later, when Jonelle decides to take Tia out to take her mind off of the separation, Robert shows up at the club and begs Tia to reconsider, only to find her being hit on by an annoying guy named Hale. Guest star: Fonzworth Bentley
24	2	"Return of the Mack"	Debbie Allen	Stacy A. Littlejohn	September 28, 2004	2T5652	2.93
Coping with heartache means moping for Robert – until he sees his son copying his depressive behavior. A fireman takes an interest in Tia after a classroom visit.
25	3	"The Kiss Off"	Debbie Allen	Lori Lakin	October 5, 2004	2T5653	3.02
After learning that Robert has started dating again, Tia immediately asks flirty fireman Rick to join her on a double date with Dirk and Jonelle, but when Robert decides to keep tabs on Tia by calling Dirk in the middle of dinner, he gets more than an earful when Dirk accidentally blurts out that Tia kissed Rick. Later, thinking Tia has moved on, Robert goes in for a passionate good night kiss with his date Sheena, but pulls back at the last minute after his eye catches a photo of Tia. Guest stars: Debi Mazar, Jaden Smith
26	4	"In Through the Out Door"	Debbie Allen	Betsy Borns & Jared Bush	October 12, 2004	2T5654	3.17
When Neesee nurses ailing Robert and Bobby Jr. back to health, Robert gets to see a more caring and nurturing side of his ex-wife, which brings back all of the old feelings he had when he first fell in love with her. Later, when Tia sees an ugly side to Rick, she realizes she is still in love with Robert and wants to reconcile, only to find out that Robert now needs space.
27	5	"Why Do Fools Fall Back in Love?"	Debbie Allen	Betsy Borns & Arthur Harris	October 19, 2004	2T5655	3.62
When Robert and Neesee decide to have dinner to discuss the romantic spark between them, their initial flirtatious behavior turns catty as old habits begin to surface, reminding them why they got divorced in the first place.
28	6	"Let's Stay Together"	Debbie Allen	Stacy A. Littlejohn & Terence Paul Winter	October 26, 2004	2T5656	3.41
It seems that Robert and Tia's relationship are coming together again only to find out that Robert confesses to Tia that he almost shared a kiss with Neesee, which makes Tia very depressed about this situation.
29	7	"Basket Cases"	Debbie Allen	Arthur Harris & Jewel Wormley	November 9, 2004	2T5657	3.32
Robert, Tia and Neesee are outraged to find out that Bobby is lost in the basketball stadium after when Robert broke Bobby's promise about taking him to a basketball game and spending some time with him, which then causes Robert, Tia and Neesee to have a serious argument. Guest star: Xzibit
30	8	"Parents Just Don't Understand"	Debbie Allen	Stacy A. Littlejohn	November 23, 2004	2T5660	3.10
When Tia's dad, Lucas, joins the family for Thanksgiving dinner, he is immediately taken with Neesee's mom (guest star Debbie Allen) and spends the entire meal flirting with her, but she wants nothing to do with him. Later, after Bobby ignores his parents' orders twice, they decide they must punish him with his first spanking. Guest stars: Debbie Allen, James Avery
31	9	"The Return of Mars Blackmon"	Debbie Allen	Lori Lakin & Josh Wolf	November 30, 2004	2T5658	3.04
Robert coaches a game in which he is forced to deal with a boisterous heckling father, but he turns the other cheek in order to teach Bobby a lesson. Guest stars: Dayna Devon, George Hertzberg, Wendy Raquel Robinson
32	10	"Home for Christmas"	Alfonso Ribeiro	Demetrius Andre Bady	December 14, 2004	2T5661	3.17
A snowstorm forces Robert off the road on his way to an interview in New York, and jeopardizes his chances of spending Christmas with Bobby and Tia. Guest stars: Lil Jon, Masi Oka, The East Side Boyz, Twista
33	11	"Liar, Liar"	Debbie Allen	Jared Bush & Byron Hord	January 4, 2005	2T5659	3.06
When Bobby lies, Robert, Neesee and Tia all have different techniques on how to deal with the situation. Also Neesee takes her therapist's advice and tries to work out some issues with her estranged father. Guest star: Meshach Taylor
34	12	"Get Me to the Church on Time"	Alfonso Ribeiro	Lori Lakin	January 11, 2005	2T5662	3.35
Robert and Neesee's old friend, Frankie comes back to town having found God and transformed to a hip and modern day minister. He inspires them to re-evaluate their lives and also to make some changes. Also after listening to Frankie preach, Bobby thinks he has sinned and will be sent to hell. Guest star: Mase
35	13	"Focus"	Debbie Allen	Betsy Borns & Jared Bush	February 8, 2005	2T5663	2.12
Robert refuses to accept that Bobby has ADD and tries to cure him without therapy. Guest star: Warren G
36	14	"Not So Wonderful News"	Debbie Allen	Ray Lancon	February 15, 2005	2T5664	2.33
Robert's romantic New York Valentine's weekend with Tia goes awry when his big interview with Serena Williams keeps getting postponed by her wacky cousin/assistant Wanda. Meanwhile, Neesee caters a high-profile party for Alex's new boyfriend Eric, but when his demands become out of control, it causes tension between the two women. Guest star: Serena Williams
37	15	"Handle Your Business"	Alfonso Ribeiro	Terence Paul Winter	February 22, 2005	2T5665	2.34
After an argument, Jonelle throws him out, so Dirk crashes on Robert and Tia's couch causing them to get sucked into their best friends' break-up. Also, Neesee co-chairs a school fundraiser with another very competitive mother, who unexpectedly winds up being the perfect business partner for her. Guest star: Wendy Raquel Robinson
38	16	"So I Creep"	Debbie Allen	Byron Hord	March 1, 2005	2T5666	2.37
Robert lands a job as a weekend correspondent for Entertainment Tonight and insists Dirk be his producer, but when he criticizes the stories they are assigning Robert, Dirk ends up quitting. Meanwhile, when Rusty, the brother of her new business partner, comes over to help Neesee build some shelves in her apartment, she unexpectedly finds herself attracted to him, but when they start dating, Rusty doesn't want to tell his sister. Guest stars: Toccara Jones, Jere Burns, Fantasia Barrino, Talib Kweli
39	17	"Movin' on Up"	Debbie Allen	Jared Bush	March 29, 2005	2T5667	2.45
When Robert finds himself unable to handle working on two shows at once, he is forced to choose between Mr. L.A. and Entertainment Tonight. Guest stars: Mario, Jere Burns, Wendy Raquel Robinson
40	18	"Passing the Test"	Debbie Allen	Chad Drew & Rob Rosell	April 19, 2005	2T5669	2.31
While celebrating Neesee's birthday at her apartment, Robert and Tia find a pregnancy test and believe Neesee is pregnant.
41	19	"Baby's Got (Flash) Back"	Debbie Allen	Arthur Harris	April 26, 2005	2T5671	2.31
When Dirk gives his opinion on how marriage changes everything, Robert, Tia, Neesee and Bobby each fantasize how their lives will be affected by Robert and Tia's marriage. Guest star: Ruben Studdard
42	20	"Hollywood Swinging"	Debbie Allen	Jewel Wormley	May 3, 2005	2T5668	2.07
It's obvious to believe that Robert is spending too much time with other celebrities while Tia is desperate in wanting him to be in her poetry show for him to support her. Meanwhile, Neesee is trying to make a move on her new boyfriend. Guest stars: Paula Abdul, Keyshia Cole
43	21	"Sail On"	Debbie Allen	Stacy A. Littlejohn	May 10, 2005	2T5670	1.99
When Robert accepts an offer from his bosses at Entertainment Tonight to pay for his wedding in return for the right to televise it on their show, Tia regrets his decision when the advertising and promotions become more important than the bride and groom. Later, Robert feels bad when he learns that Mr. L.A. is in jeopardy of being cancelled and contemplates leaving Entertainment Tonight to help his old show. Guest stars: Jere Burns, Mary Hart
44	22	"He-Male Trouble"	Debbie Allen	Betsy Borns	May 24, 2005	2T5672	2.57
The station hires a new program director who changes the format of Robert's show from a male oriented show to a show featuring feminine men. Rusty does not see eye to eye with Neesee about the status of their dating. Tia announces her pregnancy to the surprise and dismay of many. Guest star: Damon Dash

=== Season 3 (2005–06) ===
No. overall	No. in season	Title	Directed by	Written by	Original release date	Prod. code	Viewers (millions)
45	1	"Starting Over"	Debbie Allen	Jared Bush	September 19, 2005	2T7301	4.25
Following his breakup with his former fiancée Tia and losing his job a few months earlier, Robert tries to get his life back on track, until his ex-wife Neesee is forced to move in with him after her apartment burns down. Meanwhile, looking to get back into the game, Dirk talks Robert into going to a meeting to pitch a new talk show.
46	2	"If You Can't Stand the Heat..."	Chip Hurd	Rod J. Emelle	September 26, 2005	2T7303	3.58
When Neesee and Robert's living together becomes too much for him to take, he pushes her to take a chance on a new place when she receives some insurance money. Meanwhile, when Robert and Dirk shoot the new pilot for their talk show, Dirk gets a massive case of stage fright.
47	3	"Kiss, Kiss, Pass"	Debbie Allen	Arthur Harris	October 3, 2005	2T7302	3.37
Jumping back into the dating scene, Robert meets a great woman, who is understanding of his current living arrangements, but is disappointed when he finds out she once dated Dirk. Meanwhile, Robert and Neesee teach Bobby, Jr. about the tooth fairy. Guest stars: Anna Nicole Smith, Daya Vaidya
48	4	"Love at First Type"	Alfonso Ribeiro	Ray Lancon	October 10, 2005	2T7304	4.04
To get out of the rut of their non-existent love lives, both Robert and Neesee venture into the online dating scene, but they're surprised by the matchmaking results when it comes time to meet their Internet romances in person. Meanwhile, Dirk relies on advice from 7-year-old Bobby, Jr. to help with his current relationship problem.
49	5	"Divorce Means Never Having to Say I'm Sorry"	Alfonso Ribeiro	Terence Paul Winter	October 17, 2005	2T7305	3.97
When Robert and Neesee’s constant arguing starts to affect Bobby, they start to attend couples counseling. Elsewhere, Dirk uses Bobby to get women but this plan backfires when all of the women favor Bobby over Dirk.
50	6	"School Colors"	Alfonso Ribeiro	Jewel Wormley	October 24, 2005	2T7306	3.38
After being sent to a prestigious all-white private school, Bobby Jr. returns home declaring he wants to be white, and Robert and Neesee must educate their 7-year-old son on why he should be proud to be black. While at lunch with Dirk, Robert gets a call from Neesee saying that Bobby got into some trouble at school. They assume it was racism, but they find out Bobby was making other kids feel bad by saying that black people were better than white people. Meanwhile, after members of a focus group for Robert and Dirk's television show mention that Dirk is too skinny, he starts going to a personal trainer. Congresswoman Maxine Waters guest stars as herself. Guest star: Maxine Waters
51	7	"The Spy Who Smoked Me"	Alfonso Ribeiro	Lori Lakin	November 7, 2005	2T7307	3.66
After firing the thieving babysitter, Amanda (guest star Mercedes of America's Next Top Model), Robert installs a nannycam to watch the new sitter, but when he discovers Neesee has resumed her old smoking habit, his attempt to get her to quit only leads him to actually pick up the habit as well. Meanwhile, despite Robert's advice, Dirk dates Amanda and his belongings begin to slowly disappear.
52	8	"Legal Affairs: Part 1"	Debbie Allen	Lori Lakin	November 14, 2005	2T7308	3.34
Robert is surprised to learn Neesee is dating her business lawyer, especially when he learns that Neesee knows that the lawyer is married. Meanwhile, even though they are no longer together, Dirk convinces Jonelle to have his baby. Guest stars: Terri J. Vaughn, Tracey Cherelle Jones
53	9	"Legal Affairs: Part 2"	Debbie Allen	Lori Lakin	November 21, 2005	2T7309	3.88
Despite warning Neesee about getting involved with a married man, Robert finds himself stuck in the middle of the affair when both her new beau and his wife pay him a visit. Meanwhile, Dirk is excited about the baby-making process with Jonelle, but he's caught off guard by how calculated she is about the right time to conceive. Guest stars: Terri J. Vaughn, Tracey Cherelle Jones
54	10	"Creeping with the Enemy"	Steve Zuckerman	Jared Bush	November 28, 2005	2T7310	3.51
When Neesee's college friend Gwen arrives for a visit, an open feud between Robert and Gwen blossoms into a secret romance. Meanwhile, Turtle shows up on the set of Robert and Dirk's talk show and persuades them to act in his low budget western movie. Guest star: Tamyra Gray
55	11	"Who Took the Merry Out of Christmas?"	Ted Lange	Asoniti Foster & Terence Paul Winter	December 12, 2005	2T7312	3.77
Robert invites Neesee’s recently paroled brother to his house for Christmas but she suspects that he is up to no good. She is initially proven right when her brother steals all of the Christmas decorations and the food from the house. It is revealed that he stole ever thing to give back to a family that he had robbed which landed him in jail. Also, Robert tries to get Dirk a Christmas present.
56	12	"Neesee's Grave Plot"	Steve Zuckerman	Jared Bush	January 16, 2006	2T7311	3.02
Robert asks Neesee to pretend that they're still married for the benefit of his dying aunt, whom he never told about their divorce, but when she comes face to face with the woman on her deathbed, an overwrought Neesee just can't keep up the façade. Meanwhile, after running into an old flame who doesn't remember him, Dirk decides it would be a good idea to date her again. Guest star: Garrett Morris
57	13	"Trying to Love Two (Ain't Easy to Do)"	Leslie Kolins Small	Stacy A. Littlejohn	February 6, 2006	2T7313	3.71
When Dirk falls hard for Robert’s younger sister, Carmen, Robert and Neesee intervene after catching her in the arms of Nick, and the two force Carmen to tell Dirk the truth. Meanwhile, much to Neesee's chagrin, Carmen brings Bobby a pet frog, but when it gets loose in the house, everyone scrambles to find it before Neesee does. Guest star: Tisha Campbell-Martin
58	14	"Robert and Neesee Get Real"	Debbie Allen	Byron Hord	February 13, 2006	2T7315	2.91
Robert and Neesee realized they still love each over. Bobby goes on his first overnight camping trip.
59	15	"Don't It Make My Brownies Blue"	Debbie Allen	Chad Drew	February 20, 2006	2T7317	3.44
When Neesee borrows Robert's new assistant without his permission, it triggers an escalating feud between the former spouses over how they take each other for granted as roommates. Meanwhile, after Robert encourages him to spice up his social studies report by turning it into a rap, Bobby is inspired to become a rapper and begins to call himself Lil' B. Guest star: Caleeb Pinkett
60	16	"Pass the Peas"	Alfonso Ribeiro	Stacy A. Littlejohn	February 27, 2006	2T7320	3.52
Robert and Dirk run into an important food critic at the gym and get him to come to the restaurant. All he wants is to enjoy his meal but Neesee and Robert become so wrapped up in trying to impress him that they not only ruin his evening, they almost ruin their chance for a good review. Guest star: Cedric the Entertainer
61	17	"Domo Arigato, Mr. Roberto"	Alfonso Ribeiro	Jared Bush & Terence Paul Winter	March 27, 2006	2T7316	3.07
When Robert starts dating Bobby's new karate teacher, Kammy, the bond between father and son is tested as Bobby, who also has a crush on her, decides to make his own move to win her over. Meanwhile, in an effort to impress a new lady love, Clarinetta, Dirk turns to Neesee for help in the kitchen with some last-minute cooking lessons.
62	18	"He's Gotta Have It"	Alfonso Ribeiro	Arthur Harris	April 17, 2006	2T7314	2.82
Believing that his relationship with Andrea is not exclusive, Robert accepts a date with attractive segment producer Michele, but when Andrea tells him she wants to get serious, Robert has trouble breaking it off with a clingy Michele. Meanwhile, fearing that Bobby isn't her baby anymore, Neesee decides to get involved with some of the "boy" things he likes to do and ends up on a fishing trip with Bobby and Dirk.
63	19	"The N Word"	Will Smith	Royale Watkins	April 24, 2006	2T7318	2.68
Bobby blurts out the word "nigga" in the middle of his birthday party, causing debate among the adults.
64	20	"Surprise, Surprise: Part 1"	Debbie Allen	Jewel Wormley	May 1, 2006	2T7321	2.43
After a disturbing visit to the doctor's office that makes him feel old, Robert tries to rediscover his youth by getting a motorcycle and dating a young college girl. Meanwhile, Dirk's fender bender with his old flame, Beverly, is double the trouble when a shocking secret is revealed. Guest star: Vivica A. Fox
65	21	"Surprise, Surprise: Part 2"	Debbie Allen	Stacy A. Littlejohn	May 8, 2006	2T7322	2.85
After being encouraged by his old flame, Beverly, Dirk tries to develop a relationship with his newly discovered daughter, Courtney. Meanwhile, Robert dates a 19-year-old. Guest star: Vivica A. Fox
66	22	"Carmen's Karma"	Alfonso Ribeiro	Arthur Harris	May 15, 2006	2T7319	3.23
Robert's sister, Carmen, feels guilty about Robert and Neesee's divorce, so she arranges for them to makeup by putting them in romantic settings. Guest star: Tisha Campbell-Martin

=== Season 4 (2006–07) ===
No. overall	No. in season	Title	Directed by	Written by	Original release date	Prod. code	Viewers (millions)
67	1	"The Hair Down There"	Alfonso Ribeiro	Jeff Strauss	October 1, 2006	3T5851	2.30
Robert and Neesee struggle to deal with a letter that he wrote her four years earlier. Bobby discovers a hair.
68	2	"Trojan Condo"	Alfonso Ribeiro	Lori Lakin	October 8, 2006	3T5853	2.40
Neesee finds a new condo to move into, but Robert finds out that it's still under construction and won't be completed for a while. Robert's sister comes for a visit and asks to stay at the house. Guest star: Tisha Campbell-Martin
69	3	"Police... Open Up"	Debbie Allen	Royale Watkins	October 16, 2006	3T5854	2.83
Robert decides to take Bobby to the police station as a punishment for prank calling 911. However, he is the one that ends up behind bars after a secret about something he did in the past resurfaces.
70	4	"Love Do Cost a Thing"	Alfonso Ribeiro	Jared Bush	October 23, 2006	3T5852	2.93
Neesee hosts a charity bachelor auction where she bids on a date with an eligible, handsome and rich doctor (Charles Malik Whitfield), but the date doesn't go as she planned. Robert pays Neesee to bid on him, so he can avoid going on a random date, but a mystery woman outbids her. Meanwhile, Bobby goes on a "date" with Dirk, when he is the only one to bid on him. Guest star: Biz Markie
71	5	"Pretty Woman"	Debbie Allen	Stacy A. Littlejohn	October 30, 2006	3T5855	3.09
Robert comes to the aid of a stranger, Eva, when her purse is being stolen on the street and the pair end up hitting it off. After a series of dates, Dirk realizes that he knows her from a night club he frequents and confronts Robert with the news. Meanwhile, Neesee encourages Bobby to be friends with an unpopular girl in his class, resulting in a unique friendship between the two. Guest star: Chrystee Pharris
72	6	"The Courtship of Robert's Father"	Alfonso Ribeiro	Lori Lakin	November 6, 2006	3T5857	2.75
Robert and his sister prepare for their father's 60th birthday celebration. Neesee helps Courtney prepare for the school dance. Guest stars: Tisha Campbell-Martin, Glynn Turman
73	7	"Like Father, Like Son, Like Hell"	Alfonso Ribeiro	Terence Paul Winter	November 13, 2006	3T5858	3.10
After Robert and his sister Carmen learn that the man who raised them isn't Robert's biological father, Dirk and Robert decide to track the real man down. After spending some time with his biological father, Robert discovers a shocking secret about him. Though Bobby tries to hide the fact that Courtney invited her boyfriend over to the house while Neesee was working, Neesee quickly discovers the two are hiding something. Guest stars: Tisha Campbell-Martin, Glynn Turman, Vanessa Bell Calloway
74	8	"My Two Dads"	Alfonso Ribeiro	Antonia March & Jacqueline McKinley	November 20, 2006	3T5859	3.00
Robert learns that his biological father is gay, and keeps it a secret from the rest of his family. Surprisingly his father and his partner drop in for Thanksgiving, making things very interesting. Guest stars: Tisha Campbell-Martin, Glynn Turman, Vanessa Bell Calloway
75	9	"Crime and Maybe Some Punishment"	Debbie Allen	Ray Lancon	November 27, 2006	3T5856	3.03
Robert grounds Bobby from attending his field trip for being disrespectful to Dirk, but Neesee feels Robert may have gone too far and secretly takes Bobby on the trip. When Robert finds out that Neesee went behind his back, the two agree to stand together when disciplining Bobby in the future. Meanwhile, Courtney brings her new boyfriend home to meet Dirk.
76	10	"Everybody Loves Rain Man"	Debbie Allen	Arthur Harris	December 11, 2006	3T5862	2.71
Bobby is unappreciative of his Christmas presents; as a result, as punishment, his parents send Bobby's presents to a shelter where he befriends a homeless boy.
77	11	"Let's Go, Bobby, Let's Go"	Alfonso Ribeiro	Jewel Wormley	January 22, 2007	3T5860	2.46
Robert and Neesee are happy that Bobby will be playing football—at least until he comes home with news that he has joined the cheerleading squad instead.
78	12	"The B-R-E-A-K-U-P"	Alfonso Ribeiro	Jared Bush	January 29, 2007	3T5861	2.38
After attending the wedding of a friend who found true love with an overweight man, Neesee vows to go out on a date with the next man to ask her out. However, her plan takes a turn when she is asked out by Robert's very short co-worker. Guest star: Kevin Hart
79	13	"An All of Us Joint... Custody Episode"	Alfonso Ribeiro	Arthur Harris	February 5, 2007	3T5863	2.74
Neesee and Robert are both excited to learn that her new condo is ready, but Bobby tells them he doesn't want to go back and forth between houses. Robert and Neesee decide that the only solution is for Bobby to continue living at Robert's home while he and Neesee take turns living in her condo. Dirk is sent into a frenzy when Courtney develops a crush on an older man from his office.
80	14	"Artificial Intelligence"	Alfonso Ribeiro	Ray Lancon	February 12, 2007	3T5864	2.58
Bobby cheats on his aptitude test and suddenly find himself in the gifted students' program. Robert and Neesee are thrilled with Bobby's book smarts and encourage him to participate in the school's annual academic competition. Meanwhile, Neesee's new friend and neighbor, Michelle, sets her up on a date with a guy who turns out to have a weird fetish. Guest star: Toni Trucks
81	15	"Another Episode of All of Us"	Alfonso Ribeiro	Alfonso Ribeiro	February 19, 2007	3T5865	2.52
Bobby tries to steal a pair of sneakers in order to try to fit in with the cool kids at school, but is caught by the store manager. Meanwhile, Neesee reluctantly agrees to help care for her neighbor, Michelle's newborn niece, but soon finds she enjoys being around an infant. Guest star: Toni Trucks
82	16	"He's Got Game"	Alfonso Ribeiro	Antonia March & Jacqueline McKinley	February 26, 2007	3T5867	2.42
During his 15th college reunion weekend, Robert finds himself attracted to Deborah Calhoun, a professor he had a crush on back in his college days. Hoping to meet an eligible bachelor at the reunion, Neesee reconnects with Fitz Escoffrey, a national television sports reporter. Robert believes Fitz stole his successful career when he tripped Robert during a college basketball game and made the game-winning basket. Wanting to settle the feud, Robert challenges Fitz to a one-on-one basketball game, but injures himself before the game while trying to romance Professor Calhoun. Guest star: Victoria Rowell
83	17	"It Was Fun While It Lasted"	Debbie Allen	Terence Paul Winter	March 19, 2007	3T5866	2.35
Neesee realizes she wants to have another baby and visits a fertility clinic to research potential sperm donors. When she finds the donor she prefers, she decides to meet the guy face-to-face. Meanwhile, Robert and Dirk spend an evening hitting on women, and Dirk finds success when he meets Jill. Tensions between Robert and Dirk escalate when Dirk is continuously late to work. Guest stars: Toni Trucks, James R. Black
84	18	"The Boy Is Mine"	Alfonso Ribeiro	Jewel Wormley	March 26, 2007	3T5868	2.68
Robert and Dirk aren't on speaking terms so Robert becomes friendly with Neesee's new partner which definitely doesn't like. Guest star: James R. Black
85	19	"Everything Happens for a Reason"	Alfonso Ribeiro	Asoniti Foster	April 23, 2007	3T5869	2.32
After Robert lets Dirk go, he feels it was the wrong decision and so he sues him. Neesee comes clean that she hadn't met Ben by chance and that she wanted to meet her sperm donor. Guest stars: Toni Trucks, James R. Black, Anna Maria Horsford
86	20	"Sins of the Father"	Debbie Allen	Chad Drew	April 30, 2007	3T5870	2.18
Robert begins to become attached to a single parent and her child which makes Bobby feel left out. Neesee is called upon for advice after Dirk can't look after Courtney. Guest star: Meagan Good
87	21	"She Blinded Me with Science"	Debbie Allen	Stacy A. Littlejohn	May 7, 2007	3T5871	2.29
Robert learns of Neesee's plan to visit a sperm bank to have a baby. His relationship becomes strained after his former partner comes to stay. Guest star: Toni Trucks
88	22	"The Wedding Singers"	Debbie Allen	Jeff Strauss	May 14, 2007	3T5872	2.50
Neesee and Robert make a decision about a second child. Also Neesee wants Robert to come with her to her mother's wedding.
