= Laivan Greene =

American actress, singer and dancer

- Born: Laivan Greene; February 17, 1992 (age 34); Springfield, Massachusetts, U.S.
- Education: United States Military Academy (BS); Webster University (MBA)
- Occupations: Actress, singer, dancer
- Military career
- Branch: United States Army

Laivan Greene (born February 17, 1992) is an American former actress, singer and dancer known for her roles as Courtney Black in All of Us and as Keisha Ray in Jump In!.

== Early life and education ==
Greene was born on February 17, 1992, in Springfield, Massachusetts. She attended Orange Lutheran High School before earning a Bachelor of Science degree from the United States Military Academy in 2015 and a Master of Business Administration from Webster University in 2021.

== Career ==
Laivan Greene is best known for playing Keisha Ray in the Disney Channel Original Movie, Jump In!. She was also a series regular on the television show All of Us and played the role of "Braces" in Heroes.

== Filmography ==
=== Film ===
Year	Title	Role	Notes
2009	Funny People	Yo Teach...! Cast Member #2	Uncredited

=== Television ===
Year	Title	Role	Notes
2004	That's So Raven	Girl Sweepie	Episode: "Sweeps"
2004	The Nick & Jessica Variety Hour	Mouseketeer	Television film
2005	The Bernie Mac Show	Nef	Episode: "I Don't Wanna Be a Playa No More"
2005	Without a Trace	Barbara	Episode: "From the Ashes"
2006–2007	All of Us	Courtney Black	11 episodes
2007	Jump In!	Keisha Ray	Television film
2007	Just Jordan	9th Grade President	Episode: "Dead Man Joaquin"
2007	Heroes	Braces	Episode: "Fight or Flight"
2008	Girlfriends	Joi	Episode: "Stand and Deliver"
2008	Numbers	Jenna Porter	Episode: "End Game"
