= The Choir (web series) =

2013 American dramedy

- Genre: Comedy
- Created by: Issa Rae
- Starring: D.K. Uzoukwu; Yutopia Essex; Alfred 'A.J.' Jackson; Lyne Odums; Chauncey Jenkins; Idara Victor; Qualiema Green; Lanre Idewu; Jacques C. Smith; Camille Winbush
- Country of origin: United States
- Original language: English
- No. of seasons: 2
- No. of episodes: 12

Production
- Executive producers: Issa Rae; Benoni Tagoe; Tracy E. Edmonds
- Producer: Deniese Davis

Original release
- Network: YouTube
- Release: August 29, 2013 – May 13, 2015

The Choir is an American dramedy web series created by Issa Rae for the "faith and family focused" YouTube channel "Alright TV". The series, which premiered on YouTube on August 29, 2013, is "a comedic series about the personal, spiritual and often controversial dynamics of a revered church choir". Evette Dionne, writing for Bustle, counted The Choir among the "5 Best Web Series for People of Color" in December 2013.

== Plot ==
The series follows the group of African-American choir members in the United Church of Holy Christ in Fellowship, whose declining congregation forces the group to try to come up with a plan to survive. In the course of the drama, romance, intrigue, and political dealings throughout the story, the series explores the everyday life and nuances of the black church, and the relatable human struggles and experiences of its members.

In the first episode, the choir performs a gospel version of Janet Jackson's "Any Time, Any Place"; Jessie, the young lead singer, decides to "sex up" the performance, to the consternation of some of the congregation, other choir members, and the pastor.

== Characters and cast ==
- Yutopia Essex as Jessie, the lead singer in the choir
- D.K. Uzoukwu as James, Jessie's brother
- Idara Victor (Season 1) and Camille Winbush (Season 2) as Miriam, a young woman in the choir
- Alfred "A.J." Jackson as Myron, the choir director
- Lyne Odums as Ms. Debra, a pious older woman in the choir
- Chauncey Jenkins as Caleb, a young man in the choir
- Lanre Idewu as Charles, Ms. Debra's son
