= Cherish the Day (TV series) =

American television series

- Genre: Romantic drama Anthology
- Created by: Ava DuVernay
- Starring: Xosha Roquemore; Alano Miller; Cicely Tyson; Joy Bryant; Henry Simmons; Terri J. Vaughn; Richard Roundtree
- Country of origin: United States
- Original language: English
- No. of seasons: 2
- No. of episodes: 16

Production
- Executive producers: Ava DuVernay; Paul Garnes; Tanya Hamilton; Oprah Winfrey
- Running time: 40–43 min.
- Production companies: Warner Horizon Scripted Television; Harpo Films; ARRAY Filmworks

Original release
- Network: OWN
- Release: February 11, 2020 – November 22, 2022

Cherish the Day is an American romantic drama anthology television series created and produced by Ava DuVernay. The series chronicles the relationship of one couple, with each episode spanning a single day marking a significant moment. The first season took place over the course of five years. The second one expanded over a few months.

The series premiered on February 11, 2020, on Oprah Winfrey Network. Season one starred Xosha Roquemore, Alano Miller and Cicely Tyson, and the title references the Sade song "Cherish the Day". Tyson and second season star Richard Roundtree died on January 28, 2021, and October 24, 2023, at the ages of 96 and 81, respectively; this was their final television appearance.

On October 26, 2020, the series was renewed for a second season. It was announced in July 2021 that Joy Bryant and Henry Simmons would star in the second season. Season 2 premiered on October 4, 2022. Several appearances of Omar J. Dorsey and Timon Kyle Durrett playing Hollywood and Davis, respectively revealed that the show takes place within the same universe as Queen Sugar.

== Cast ==
=== Main ===
- Xosha Roquemore as Gently James (season 1)
- Alano Miller as Evan Fisher (season 1)
- Cicely Tyson as Miss Luma Lee Langston (season 1)
- Joy Bryant as Sunday St. James (season 2)
- Henry Simmons as Ellis Moran (season 2)
- Terri J. Vaughn as Anastasia (season 2)
- Richard Roundtree as Mandeville "MV" St. James (season 2)

=== Recurring ===
- Loren Lott as Rika (season 1)
- Michael Beach as Ben
- Anne-Marie Johnson as Marilyn Fisher
- Kellee Stewart as Ellene
- Dorien Wilson as Johnny Fisher
- Beau Billingslea as Pastor Gordon

== Episodes ==
=== Series overview ===
Season	Title	Episodes	Originally released	
Season	Title	Episodes	First released	Last released
1	Gently & Evan	8	February 11, 2020	March 24, 2020
2	Sunday & Ellis	8	October 4, 2022	November 22, 2022

=== Season 1: Gently & Evan (2020) ===
No. overall	No. in season	Title	Directed by	Written by	Original release date	U.S viewers (millions)
1	1	"Genesis"	Tanya Hamilton	Ava DuVernay	February 11, 2020	0.75
2	2	"Synthesis"	Tanya Hamilton	Wayne Stamps	February 12, 2020	0.26
3	3	"Oasis"	Deborah Kampmeier	Chloé Hung	February 18, 2020	0.77
4	4	"Basis"	Deborah Kampmeier	Tanya Hamilton	February 25, 2020	0.83
5	5	"Analysis"	Blitz Bazawule	Sylvia L. Jones	March 3, 2020	0.77
6	6	"Nemesis"	Blitz Bazawule	Teri Schaffer	March 10, 2020	0.68
7	7	"Synopsis"	Aurora Guerrero	Sylvia L. Jones	March 17, 2020	0.47
8	8	"Catharsis"	Aurora Guerrero	Raynelle Swilling	March 24, 2020	0.44

=== Season 2: Sunday & Ellis (2022) ===
No. overall	No. in season	Title	Directed by	Written by	Original release date	U.S viewers (millions)
9	1	"Rain Has Drops"	Angel Kristi Williams	Teri Schaffer & Raynelle Swilling	October 4, 2022	0.25
10	2	"Sun Has Shine"	Sheldon Candis	Sylvia L. Jones	October 11, 2022	0.22
11	3	"Moon Has Beams"	Angel Kristi Williams	Lolis Eric Elie & Lina Patel	October 18, 2022	0.24
12	4	"That Make You Mine"	Sheldon Candis	Lolis Eric Elie	October 25, 2022	N/A
13	5	"Rivers Have Banks"	Angel Kristi Williams	Lina Patel	November 1, 2022	0.24
14	6	"Sands for Shores"	Merawi Gerima	Sylvia L. Jones & Josiah Johnson	November 8, 2022	0.25
15	7	"Hearts Have Heartbeats"	Tchaiko Omawale	Josiah Johnson	November 15, 2022	N/A
16	8	"That Make Me Yours"	Angel Kristi Williams	Teri Schaffer & Raynelle Swilling	November 22, 2022	N/A
