= An American Girl Story – Melody 1963: Love Has to Win =

An American Girl Story Melody 1963: Love Has to Win
- Promo poster
- Directed by: Tina Mabry
- Screenplay by: Alison McDonald
- Based on: Melody by Denise Lewis Patrick
- Produced by: Tina Mabry
- Starring: Marsai Martin; Frances Fisher; Idara Victor; Frankie Faison
- Cinematography: Joe Pennella
- Edited by: Cheryl Campsmith
- Music by: Danny Lux
- Production companies: Freedom Road Productions; Picrow; Amazon Studios
- Distributed by: Amazon.com
- Release date: October 21, 2016
- Running time: 48 minutes
- Country: United States
- Language: English

An American Girl Story – Melody 1963: Love Has to Win is a 2016 American drama film starring Marsai Martin in the title role, alongside Frances Fisher, Idara Victor and Frankie Faison in supporting roles. Set in Detroit, Michigan, during the Civil Rights Movement, the film revolves around African-American girl Melody Ellison, as she faces adversity and discrimination in her hometown and learns to overcome it through her creativity and imagination.

The film is the first in the American Girl film series to be released exclusively on an online streaming service, and is Amazon Studios' first original special. Love Has to Win is also the first Historical/BeForever feature since the 2008 theatrical release Kit Kittredge: An American Girl. Common served as the executive producer in the film.

== Plot ==
Set in 1963, the film revolves around Melody Ellison, an African-American girl living in Detroit, Michigan, with her mother Frances and her grandfather Frank. Early on she and her family face racial inequality in their hometown, with Melody being bullied at school by a white student named Donald along with his friends for her ethnicity, or wrongfully accused of shoplifting at a clothing store where Melody's mother works.

A turning point for Melody comes when a fellow student expresses her intention of moving to another school out of fear for being discriminated, and when news about the 16th Street Baptist Church bombing was aired on television, making her question the Pledge of Allegiance and consider moving to a school at her neighborhood. Fearing that a similar bombing would take place at the chapel where Melody's family attend mass in, Melody tries to convince her mother not to perform at a fundraising concert for the Birmingham victims; Frances reassures her, and sees hope in her daughter. Melody puts her creative skill at clothing design to good use, upcycling an old garment into a shawl for her mother to wear at her piano performance.

At church, she meets her teacher, Miss Abbot, who brought the other students along as part of a field trip. Donald walks out as he refuses to take Melody's hand; Melody's best friend Tricia volunteers to hold her hand instead. The concert takes place as planned. The film ends with Melody and the rest of the churchgoers performing "Lift Every Voice and Sing." A short tribute to the four young victims of the Birmingham bombing appears in a post-credits sequence.

== Cast ==
Starring

- Marsai Martin as Melody Ellison
- Idara Victor as Frances Ellison
- Frances Fisher as Miss Abbot
- Frankie Faison as Frank Ellison

Supporting cast

- Garrett McQuaid as Donald
- Dara Iruka as Lorraine
- Lola Wayne Villa as Trica
- Matthew Foster as Principal Davis
- Briana Lane as Sales Clerk aka Val
- Chuck McCollum as Store Manager
- Rocky McMurray as Mr. Schuler
- Daija Bickham as Neighborhood Girl #1
- Skyelar Wesley as Neighborhood Girl #2
- Libby Ewing as Mother in Store
- Joelle Better as Daughter in Store

== Release ==
The direct-to-video film was released to Amazon Prime subscribers on October 21, 2016.

== See also ==
- Civil rights movement in popular culture
