= Fantasy Football (film) =

2022 American sports family film

- Streaming release poster
- Directed by: Anton Cropper
- Written by: Zoe Marshall; Dan Gurewitch; David Young
- Produced by: Spencer Beighley; Timothy M. Bourne; Jamal Henderson; LeBron James; Joshua Martin; Marsai Martin
- Starring: Marsai Martin; Omari Hardwick; Kelly Rowland
- Cinematography: Anthony Hardwick
- Edited by: Sarah Lucky
- Music by: Kovas
- Production companies: Nickelodeon Movies; SpringHill Company; NFL Films; Awesomeness Films; Genius Productions
- Distributed by: Paramount+
- Release date: November 25, 2022 (United States)
- Running time: 98 minutes
- Country: United States
- Language: English

Fantasy Football is a 2022 American fantasy sports comedy film directed by Anton Cropper and written by Zoe Marshall, Dan Gurewitch and David Young from a story by Richard T. Jones, Jeremy Loethen, and Tim Ogletree. Produced by SpringHill Company, NFL Films, and Nickelodeon Movies, the film stars Marsai Martin, Omari Hardwick, and Kelly Rowland. It released on November 25, 2022 on Paramount+ and received mixed to negative reviews from critics, who found it to be generic and a shameless plug for EA Sports' Madden NFL games.

In June 2023, the film was silently removed from Paramount+.

== Plot ==
15-year-old Callie Coleman is a bright and tech-savvy teen who is the daughter of Bobby and Keisha Coleman. Her father is a once-promising NFL running back whose career has been plagued by fumbles and team changes, the latter of which means the family is constantly moving. Consequently, Callie never gets to stay anywhere long-term to celebrate her birthday. With Bobby joining the Atlanta Falcons, she is "the new kid" in Atlanta but supportive of her dad's latest—and likely last—shot in the league.

One stormy night, Callie discovers a glitch in Madden NFL 23 that seems to grant her real-world control over Bobby's moves on the field. After testing the theory and seeing Bobby suddenly perform like a superstar, Callie and her new friends in the school's robotics club realize the game has somehow synced with real-life performance. Discreetly, Callie begins taking control of Bobby and helping him succeed.

As Bobby drastically improves, he becomes a media sensation and the Falcons begin winning games. Callie, hiding behind the scenes, juggles the responsibilities of high school and controlling her dad's every move on the field. However, Bobby begins to believe his success is truly his own doing whereas Callie starts to question the morality of controlling someone else's life, even for a good cause, leading to their relationship being strained.

As the NFL playoffs loom, Callie must choose between continuing to manipulate the game or letting her father play on his own merits. Callie reveals the truth and the two reconcile. Learning to believe in himself again and not take the sport too seriously, Bobby leads the Falcons on his legitimate ability. Callie finally has a new home to celebrate her 16th birthday with her friends Kayla, Margot, Zoey, Oliver, and new boyfriend, Nate.

== Cast ==
- Marsai Martin as Callie, a technologically gifted high schooler, who excels at video games and robotics. Estella Kahiha and Rudie Bolton portray younger versions of Callie
- Omari Hardwick as Bobby Coleman, a professional football player who plays for the Atlanta Falcons and Callie’s father.
- Kelly Rowland as Keisha, Callie's mom and Bobby's wife.
- Rome Flynn as Anderson Fisher, Bobby’s rival and teammate of the Atlanta Falcons.
- Hanani Taylor as Kayla, a member of the school's robotics club and Callie's new friend.
- Elijah Richardson as Nate, a member of the school's robotics club and Callie's new love interest.
- Abigail Killmeier as Margot, a member of the school's robotics club and Callie's new friend.
- Tyla Harris as Zoey, a member of the school's robotics club and Callie's new friend.
- Isac Ivan as Oliver, a member of the school's robotics club who never says a word but is surprisingly a gifted opera singer.

== Production ==
The film was formally unveiled on September 27, 2022. Various facts about the film were quickly unveiled alongside the announcement, including the film's cast, an official poster, and a crew listing. The film was backed by EA Sports, publisher of the Madden NFL 23 game featured in the film, which led to some publications deeming the film an advertisement for the video game. In an interview, stars Rome Flynn and Omari Hardwick said that one of their favorite aspects of the film was the on-set chemistry the two of them had. In an interview with BET, Marsai Martin stated that she wanted her character's interest in robotics to make her a very strong intelligent character, saying that "Black girls in STEM are such a beautiful thing and it's a powerful thing. It just really tells a lot about how your mind works. I love shining a light on the amazing things that Black girls can do and are able to do."

== Release ==
In addition to its announcement, the film was given a release date of November 25, 2022.

=== Marketing ===
A trailer for the film was released on October 26, 2022.

=== Reception ===
On review aggregator site Rotten Tomatoes, the film holds a 40% approval rating based on reviews from 5 critics. Brandon Yu of The New York Times called the film "controlled chaos", stating that it is "mostly perfunctory. [...] a long ad for Madden [...] and lacks a true charisma that would make it a children’s classic worth revisiting." Marco Castaneda of Hollywood Insider on the other hand, spoke more positively about the film, praising it for showing the "importance of family", and saying that it has "a wonderful cast and production team that involves LeBron James and his collaborator, agent, and long-time friend Maverick Carter. The film will have audiences entertained and their hearts will be touched."
