= Jade Novah =

American singer, songwriter and actress

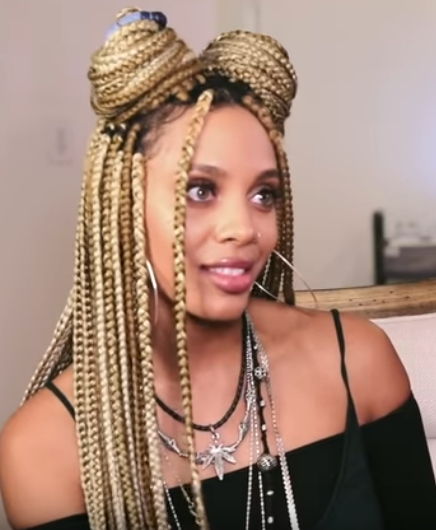
- Jade Novah in November 2018

Background information
- Born: Lindsay Fields; May 30, 1986 (age 40); Cleveland, Ohio, U.S.
- Genres: Pop; R&B
- Occupation: Singer-songwriter-actress
- Years active: 2012–present
- Labels: Empire; Let There Be Art
- Website: www.jadenovahofficial.com

Lindsay Fields (born May 30, 1986), known professionally as Jade Novah, is an American singer, songwriter, and actress. She rose to prominence for her YouTube videos covering songs such as "Diamonds" by Rihanna. Novah's debut album, All Blue, was nominated for a 2019 NAACP Image Award in the Best New Artist category.

== Career ==
Novah was raised in Cleveland, Ohio and grew up singing in church. At 21, she moved to Atlanta and began songwriting for artists such as Myá, Melanie Fiona and Christina Milian. In 2012, she pursued a solo singing career. Novah has performed as a backup singer for artists such as Beyoncé, Lady Gaga, and Rihanna. Novah somewhere in 2011- 2012 created a writer's demo for Ariana Grande unreleased song "Parachute" intended for Grande's debut album Yours Truly.

Novah first gained prominence for her YouTube cover videos. A cover of "Diamonds" by Rihanna received 11 million views as of 2013. She released her first single in August 2013, "Show Out". An album called In Search Of Me was announced in November 2013, but was never released. It was produced by her husband, Devin Johnson.

On July 13, 2018, she released her debut album, "All Blue". For the album, she was nominated for a 2019 NAACP Image Award as Best New Artist. She appeared on FOX's The Four: Battle for Stardom as a vocal producer and mentor, as well as co-hosted The Morning Culture Show on V-103 in Atlanta. "I Just Wanna Know" is the introduction into Jade's forthcoming concept album set to release in 2022. Following the success of "I Just Wanna Know" Jade released "Lost in You", the second single of her upcoming project.

=== Other work ===
In 2018, Novah also went viral for her comedic parody YouTube video where she portrayed Beyoncé, Toni Braxton, and others. That year she was also a music mentor for contestants on The Four. She began working as a VJ for V-103's morning show in January 2019 and left after nine months to focus on her career. Novah has appeared on the TV show That's My Jam on NBC.

In 2023, she appeared in a Season 34 episode of The Simpsons.

In 2025, Jade Novah starred in the Netflix comedy Miss Governor.

== Personal life ==
Novah is married to Devin Johnson, her producer and music manager.

== Discography ==
=== Studio albums ===
- All Blue (2018)
- Stages (2020)
- Where Have I Been? (2024)

=== Mixtapes ===
- Shades of Jade (2012)

== Filmography ==
Year	Title	Role	Notes
2023	The Simpsons	Ashlee Starling, Echo (voices)	Episode: "Fan-ily Feud"
2025	Miss Governor	Shamika Latavia Latoya Farrah Dunkerson	Main cast
2026	Safe Space	Jade	Main cast
