= Terri J. Vaughn =

American actress, director and producer (born 1969)

Terri J. Vaughn-Riley
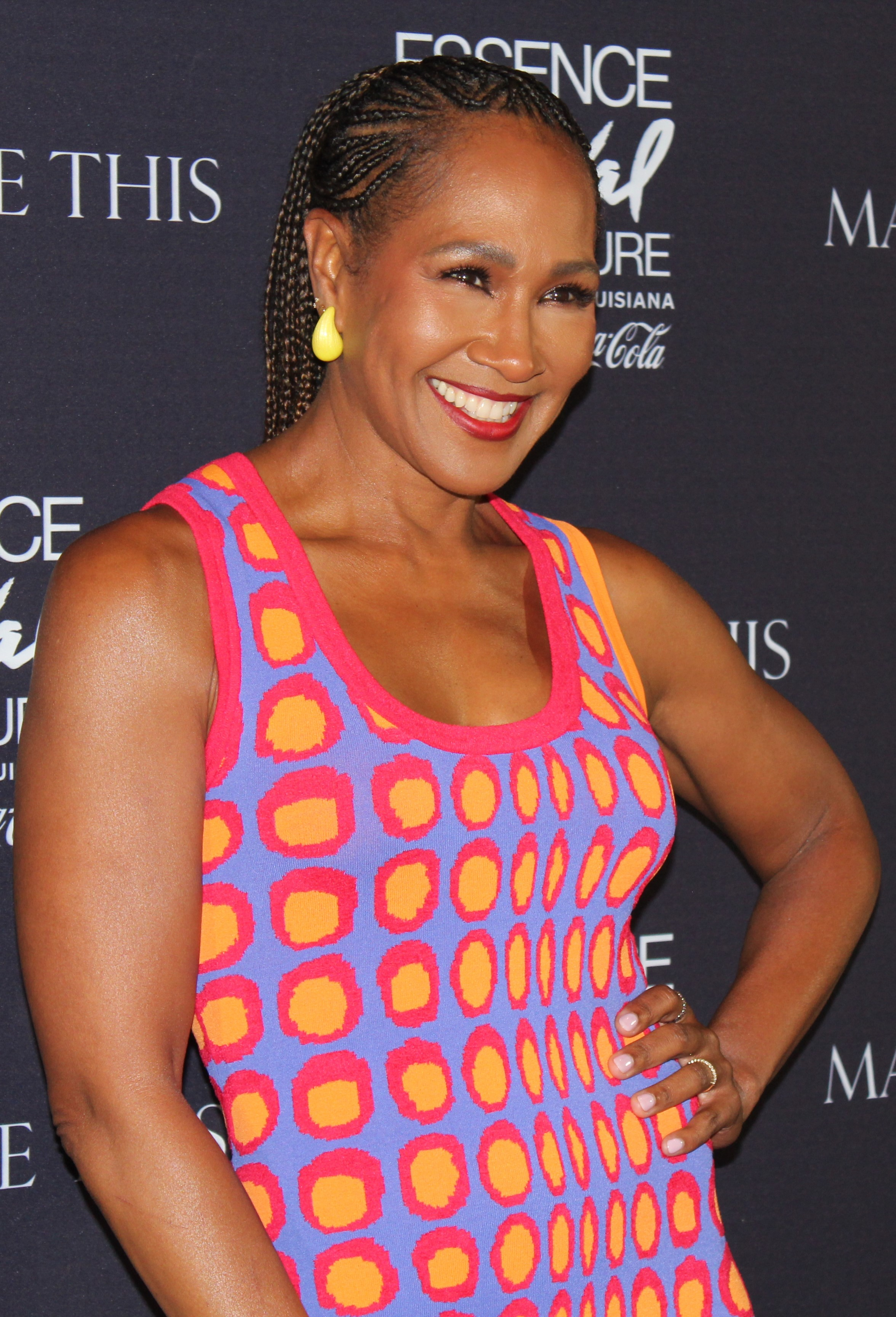
- Vaughn at EssenceFest 2025 in July.
- Born: Terri Juanita Vaughn; October 16, 1969 (age 56); San Francisco, California, U.S.
- Occupations: Actress, director, producer
- Years active: 1993–present
- Spouses: Derrick Carolina (m. 1999; div. 2005) Karon Riley (m. 2008)
- Children: 3
- Website: terrijvaughn.com

Terri Juanita Vaughn-Riley (née Vaughn; born October 16, 1969) is an American actress, director and producer. She is best known for her role as high school secretary Lovita Alizay Jenkins-Robinson in The WB sitcom The Steve Harvey Show (1997–2002), for which she received three NAACP Image Awards for Outstanding Supporting Actress in a Comedy Series. She later co-starred in the UPN/The CW sitcom All of Us (2003–2005), and TBS sitcom Meet the Browns (2009–2011). In 2025, Vaught created, produced and starred in the Netflix political comedy series, Miss Governor.

== Career ==
=== Acting ===
In her early career, Vaughn appeared in the films Friday and Don't Be a Menace to South Central While Drinking Your Juice in the Hood. She co-starred opposite Joan Severance in the comedy-action film Black Scorpion (1995) and its sequel, Black Scorpion II: Aftershock (1997). Later in 1997, Vaughn was cast as high school secretary Lovita Alizay Jenkins-Robinson for the second season of The WB sitcom The Steve Harvey Show. She received three NAACP Image Award for Outstanding Supporting Actress in a Comedy Series for her performance on show. The series ended in 2002, and Vaughn later that year joined the cast of Showtime drama series Soul Food as Eva Holly. She received another NAACP Image Award for Outstanding Supporting Actress in a Drama Series nomination.

From 2003 to 2005, Vaughn was regular cast member on the UPN/The CW sitcom All of Us. In 2007, she had supporting role in the Tyler Perry's comedy-drama film Daddy's Little Girls opposite Gabrielle Union, and later had a regular role on another of Perry's productions, Meet the Browns (2009-2011). In 2016, Vaughn was cast in the recurring role as housekeeper in Oprah Winfrey Network drama series, Greenleaf opposite Keith David and Lynn Whitfield. In 2020 Vaughn had a recurring role as Robin in Shona Ferguson's South African series, Kings Of Jo'Burg shown on Netflix, and the HBO comedy series, Insecure. She starred in the second season of Oprah Winfrey Network romantic drama Cherish the Day and had a recurring roles on Johnson and First Wives Club both in 2022. In 2025, Vaught created, produced and starred in the Netflix political comedy series, Miss Governor.

=== Directing and producing ===
She owns a production company alongside her business partner, Cas Sigers, called Nina Holiday Entertainment, that produced films such as Sugar Mommas, A Cross to Bear and Girlfriends' Getaway. In 2016, Vaughn made her directing debut with the comedy film #DigitalLivesMatter. She later directed made-for-television and for streaming movies Merry Wish-Mas (2018), Christmas Belles (2019), Twas the Chaos before Christmas (2019), Dear Santa, I Need a Date (2019), Angrily Ever After (2019), Hip Hop Holiday (2019), A Christmas Surprise (2020), Soul Santa (2021), A Merry Switchmas (2021), Unthinkably Good Things (2022), and So Fly Christmas (2023). She directed episodes of television series Mann and Wife, Kingdom Business, Tales, Bunk'd, Miss Governor and Reasonable Doubt.

== Personal life ==
Vaughn grew up in San Francisco, California. She was married to Derrick Carolina and had a son, Daylen Ali (2001). She is currently married to former football player Karon Riley, and the couple have a son and a daughter.

== Filmography ==
=== Film ===
Year	Title	Role	Notes
1993	Sister Act 2: Back in the Habit	Student	
1995	Friday	China	
1995	Black Scorpion	Tender Lovin'	
1995	Excessive Force II: Force on Force	Grace	
1996	Don't Be a Menace	Keisha	
1996	Carnosaur 3: Primal Species	B.T. Coolidge	
1997	Black Scorpion II: Aftershock	Tender Lovin'	
1997	8 Heads in a Duffel Bag	Flight Attendant	
2000	The Smoker	-	Short
2003	Detonator	Sharona Brown	
2005	Fair Game	Wanda	
2005	Exposure	Woman #1	Short
2006	Stick It	Susie Mack	
2007	Dirty Laundry	Jackie	
2007	Daddy's Little Girls	Brenda	
2007	Redrum	Amber	
2007	Angels Can't Help But Laugh	Herself	
2007	Three Can Play That Game	Linda	
2010	Baby Mama's Club	Mrs. Lagos	
2010	Love Me or Leave Me	Sheila Edwards	TV movie
2010	This Time	Janet	Short
2012	Think Like a Man	Audience Member	
2012	Sugar Mommas	Sheila	TV movie
2012	The Marriage Chronicles	Kamel Jackson	
2012	Probable Cause	Tamika	
2012	Life, Love, Soul	Tiffany	
2013	Who Did I Marry?	Jennifer	
2013	Between Sisters	Benita	TV movie
2013	In the Meantime	Nina	TV movie
2013	Not 4 Sale	Juanita Poitier	Short
2014	Where's the Love?	Kai	TV movie
2014	Hamlet & Hutch	Kendall	Video
2014	Girlfriends' Getaway	Sophie	TV movie
2014	Breeze	Brenda	
2015	72 Hours	Kia	
2015	Touched	Laura	
2015	Girlfriends' Getaway 2	Sophie	TV movie
2015	Soul Ties	Ruth	
2016	Beat Street	Mayor Cummings	Video
2017	Love by Chance	Herself	
2018	Melinda	Stacia LeBeau	
2018	One Crazy Christmas	Felecia	
2019	Cultural Clash	Mrs. Jefferson	
2019	His, Hers & the Truth	Craigs Mom	
2020	Heaven On Seven	Sister Lisa	
2020	The Millennial	Mrs. Sterling	
2020	A Christmas Surprise	Aisha	TV movie
2022	The Millennial	Mrs. Sterling	
2023	Here Comes the Sun	Ruth	
2024	Color Book	Robyn	
2024	Queens of Christmas	Doris Griffin	
2025	I Hate My Love Life	Angie Turner	Short
2025	I Thought You'd Never Ask	Nathan's Mom	Short

=== Television ===
Year	Title	Role	Notes
1993	Living Single	Woman #1	Episode: "Great Expectations"
1993	The Sinbad Show	Woman #1	Episode: "Strictly Business"
1994	Married... with Children	Connie	Episode: "Business Sucks: Part 1"
1994	Family Matters	Girl #1 at Party	Episode: "Beta Chi Guy"
1995	Sherman Oaks	Denise Cook	Episode: "Attack of the Killer Tomatoes"
1995	Family Matters	Eddie's Date	Episode: "They Shoot Urkels, Don't They?"
1997–2002	The Steve Harvey Show	Lovita Alizay Jenkins Robinson	Main Cast: Seasons 2–6
1999	ER	Mrs. Gleason	Episode: "Point of Origin"
2001	The Test	Herself/Panelist	Episode: "The PDA Test" & "The Optimist Test"
2002–03	Soul Food	Eva Holly	Guest: Season 3, Recurring Cast: Season 4
2003	Girlfriends	Tasha	Episode: "Single Mama, Drama"
2003-05	All of Us	Jonelle Abrahams	Main Cast: Seasons 1–2, Guest: Season 3
2004	The Drop	Herself	Episode: "Episode #1.35"
2008	Baisden After Dark	Herself	Episode: "Are Women Too Picky?"
2009–11	Meet the Browns	Renee	Recurring Cast: Season 3, Main Cast: Seasons 4–5
2011	The Real Housewives of Atlanta	Herself	Episode: "The Bride and the Doom"
2013	JD Lawrence's Community Service	Lydia	Main Cast
2016	Being	Herself	Episode: "Terri J. Vaughn"
2016	Unsung Hollywood	Herself	Episode: "Jasmine Guy"
2016	Greenleaf	Melisse	Recurring Cast: Season 1
2017	Mann & Wife	Lieutenant Tate	Recurring Cast: Season 3
2018	Rel	Tia	Episode: "Windy City Politics"
2020	Insecure	Rose Cranberry	Recurring Cast: Season 4
2020	Terror Lake Drive	Dr. Chisholm	Episode: "Something About AJ"
2020	Kings of Jo'burg	Robin	Recurring Cast
2020–21	We Stay Looking	Rose Cranberry	Main Cast
2021–22	First Wives Club	Cousin Pam	Guest: Season 2, Recurring Cast: Season 3
2022	The Neighborhood	Claire	Episode: "Welcome to the Man Code"
2022	Johnson	Wanda Brooks	Recurring Cast: Season 2
2022	Cherish the Day	Anastasia	Main Cast: Season 2
2025	Miss Governor	Antoinette Dunkerson	Main Cast

== Awards and nominations ==
Year	Association	Category	Work	Result
2000	NAACP Image Awards	Outstanding Supporting Actress in a Comedy Series	The Steve Harvey Show	Nominated
2001	NAACP Image Awards	Outstanding Supporting Actress in a Comedy Series	The Steve Harvey Show	Won
2002	NAACP Image Awards	Outstanding Supporting Actress in a Comedy Series	The Steve Harvey Show	Won
2003	NAACP Image Awards	Outstanding Supporting Actress in a Comedy Series	The Steve Harvey Show	Won
2004	NAACP Image Awards	Outstanding Supporting Actress in a Drama Series	Soul Food	Nominated
2004	BET Awards	BET Comedy Award for Outstanding Supporting Actress in a Comedy Series	All of Us	Nominated
