= All of Us =

American television sitcom (2003–2007)

- Genre: Sitcom
- Created by: Jada Pinkett Smith; Will Smith; Betsy Borns
- Starring: Duane Martin; LisaRaye McCoy; Elise Neal; Khamani Griffin; Tony Rock; Terri J. Vaughn; James Vincent; Laivan Greene
- Music by: Kurt Farquhar
- Opening theme: "All of Us", performed by Sheléa (seasons 1–3); "All of Us", performed by Toni Estes (season 4)
- Country of origin: United States
- Original language: English
- No. of seasons: 4
- No. of episodes: 88 (list of episodes)

Production
- Executive producers: Jada Pinkett Smith; Will Smith; James Lassiter; Betsy Borns; Arthur Harris; Jeff Strauss
- Camera setup: Multi-camera
- Running time: 20 minutes
- Production companies: Overbrook Entertainment; Warner Bros. Television

Original release
- Network: UPN
- Release: September 16, 2003 – May 15, 2006
- Network: The CW
- Release: October 1, 2006 – May 14, 2007

All of Us is an American sitcom that premiered on the UPN network in the United States on September 16, 2003, where it aired for its first three seasons. On October 1, 2006, the show moved to The CW, a new network formed by the merger of UPN and The WB (whose sister company Warner Bros. Television produced this series), where it aired for one more season before being cancelled on May 15, 2007.

== Synopsis ==
The series, loosely based on the blended family of creator and executive producers Jada Pinkett Smith and Will Smith, revolved around Robert James Sr. (Duane Martin), a divorced television entertainment reporter with a young son, Robert "Bobby" James Jr. (Khamani Griffin), and his fiancée Tia Jewel (Elise Neal), a kindergarten teacher who helped him through the breakup of his first marriage.

Robert shares custody of his son with his ex-wife Neesee (LisaRaye McCoy), with whom he shares a tenuously friendly relationship for the sake of their son.

Robert also finds himself in a difficult situation, attempting to maintain the peace, however uneasy, between his ex-wife and his fiancée. Friends of the couple include Dirk Black (Tony Rock), Robert's single best friend and producer, and Tia's best friend and fellow teacher Jonelle Abrahams (Terri J. Vaughn).

In season three, Tia breaks her engagement to Robert, leaving a newly single Robert faced with a situation where Neesee must move in with him and Bobby temporarily after her apartment building is destroyed by fire. In addition to Tia, two other supporting characters, Jonelle and Turtle (James Vincent), were written out of the series. In season four, Laivan Greene joined the cast as Courtney, Dirk's long-lost daughter previously portrayed by Raven Goodwin in the third season's two-part episodes titled "Surprise, Surprise".

== Cast and characters ==
=== Main ===
| Character | Portrayed by | Appearances | | | |
| Character | Portrayed by | Season 1 | Season 2 | Season 3 | Season 4 |
|---|---|---|---|---|---|
| Robert James Sr. | Duane Martin | Main | Main | Main | Main |
| Neesee Harrison James | LisaRaye McCoy | Main | Main | Main | Main |
| Robert "Bobby" James Jr. | Khamani Griffin | Main | Main | Main | Main |
| Dirk Black | Tony Rock | Main | Main | Main | Main |
| Tia Jewel | Elise Neal | Main | Main | | |
| Jonelle Abrahams | Terri J. Vaughn | Main | Main | Guest | |
| Turtle | James Vincent | Recurring | Main | Guest | |
| Courtney | Laivan Greene | | | | Main |

== Episodes ==
| Season | Episodes | Originally released | | |
| Season | Episodes | First released | Last released | Network |
|---|---|---|---|---|
| 1 | 22 | September 16, 2003 | May 18, 2004 | UPN |
| 2 | 22 | September 21, 2004 | May 24, 2005 | UPN |
| 3 | 22 | September 19, 2005 | May 15, 2006 | UPN |
| 4 | 22 | October 1, 2006 | May 14, 2007 | The CW |

== Production ==
=== Cast changes ===
In June 2005, Elise Neal, who portrayed Tia Jewel, announced that she would not be returning for the third season of the series, claiming that marital issues between Will Smith and Jada Pinkett-Smith were negatively impacting the show's work environment. In August 2005, Terri J. Vaughn who played Jonelle Abrahams, and James Vincent, who played Turtle, also announced they would not be returning to the series due to contract issues.

In November 2005, Terri J. Vaughn returned to play Jonelle in a guest appearance for the third season's two-part episodes, titled "Legal Affairs". James Vincent returned to play Turtle in a guest appearance in the third season episode "Creeping with the Enemy".

=== Cancellation ===
On May 15, 2007, The CW canceled All of Us, along with many other programs that originated from UPN and The WB.

== Broadcast ==
=== First run ===
All of Us debuted on UPN on September 16, 2003. The series aired on Tuesdays at 8:30 PM (EST) for its first season. The second season aired on Tuesday nights at 8:00 PM and was paired up with fellow UPN sitcom Eve.

For its third season, UPN moved the series to Mondays at 8:30 PM (EST) airing after One on One. After three seasons of average ratings, and with the fall 2006 launch of The CW necessitating the cancellations of many of UPN and The WB's lower-rated programs, All of Us was slated to be cancelled after the 2005–2006 television season. However, the series was saved at the last minute and placed on The CW's fall 2006 lineup, airing on Sundays at 7:30 PM (EST) after Everybody Hates Chris.

Due to lackluster ratings, the show returned to its former slot on Monday nights on October 16, 2006. During its single season on The CW, All of Us averaged around 2.74 million viewers per week. All of Us finished the season at #140 in the ratings, surpassing only The Game, America's Next Top Model (encore presentations), and Runaway.

=== Syndication and reruns ===
In 2006, TV One began broadcasting the series as part of an agreement with Warner Bros. Domestic Cable Distribution. Along with Eve, All of Us marked the first time in which the channel acquired the rights for shows that were currently airing on network television.

On September 24, 2007, The CW began airing reruns of All of Us as part of the network's daytime programming block. Reruns of the show aired weekdays at 3 p.m. EST, alongside What I Like About You and Reba, remaining until September 2008. It also aired in Australia on the Nine Network and in the United Kingdom on Trouble.

=== Streaming ===
The series is streaming on Philo. In March 2021, the series began streaming on Hulu.

== Ratings ==
| Season | | Episodes | Premiere | Season finale | Viewers (in millions) | Rank |
|---|---|---|---|---|---|---|
| 1 | 2003–04 | 22 | September 16, 2003 | May 18, 2004 | 3.4 | #176 |
| 2 | 2004–05 | 22 | September 21, 2004 | May 24, 2005 | 2.6 | #147 |
| 3 | 2005–06 | 22 | September 19, 2005 | May 15, 2006 | 3.2 | #135 |
| 4 | 2006–07 | 22 | October 1, 2006 | May 14, 2007 | 2.45 | #249 |
