= Little (film) =

2019 film by Tina Gordon Chism and Marsai Martin

- Theatrical release poster
- Directed by: Tina Gordon
- Screenplay by: Tracy Oliver; Tina Gordon
- Story by: Tracy Oliver
- Produced by: Will Packer; Kenya Barris; James Lopez
- Starring: Regina Hall; Issa Rae; Marsai Martin
- Cinematography: Greg Gardiner
- Edited by: David Moritz
- Music by: Germaine Franco
- Production companies: Legendary Pictures; Will Packer Productions; Perfect World Pictures
- Distributed by: Universal Pictures
- Release dates: April 8, 2019 (New Haven); April 12, 2019 (United States)
- Running time: 109 minutes
- Country: United States
- Language: English
- Budget: $20 million
- Box office: $49 million

Little is a 2019 American fantasy comedy film directed and co-written by Tina Gordon. It stars Regina Hall, Issa Rae and Marsai Martin, and follows an overbearing boss who is transformed into the teenage version of herself. Martin serves as an executive producer for the film, and at 14 years old, is the youngest person to ever hold that title on a Hollywood production.

The film was released in New Haven on April 8, 2019, and it was released in the United States on April 12, 2019, by Universal Pictures, and grossed over $48 million worldwide. It received mixed reviews from critics, who praised the performances and heart but called it "a bit safer and lighter on laughs than many would like." It is the last Legendary Pictures film distributed by Universal before the studio returned to working with Warner Bros. Pictures.

== Plot ==
Bullied as a teen, businesswoman Jordan Sanders has become the bully as she runs her own tech company with an iron fist and treats her employees very poorly. After she behaves rudely towards a child using a toy magic wand, the child wishes that Jordan was a kid again.

The wish comes true the next morning when Jordan wakes up as her 13-year-old self. With her assistant April Williams temporarily taking over the company, Jordan is forced to return to the school where she was previously bullied. Because Jordan is now a "minor", April poses as her aunt.

At school, Jordan is introduced to her teacher, Mr. Marshall, whom she develops a crush on. Once again the target of bullies, Jordan befriends three other outcasts - Isaac, Raina, and Devon. Meanwhile, April has difficulty keeping everyone's attention at work without Jordan's authority to back her up. At a restaurant, Jordan and April have dinner, bonding over their personal lives. Jordan loudly sings Rose Royce's "I'm Goin' Down" while intoxicated, embarrassing April. Despite her embarrassment, April sings along with Jordan, ending with Jordan accidentally pulling off a man's weave.

Meanwhile, the company's biggest client threatens to move to a competitor if the firm doesn't pitch him a great idea for a mobile app. Unable to reach Jordan before they pitch, April presents an original idea, "Discover Eyes", that Jordan had previously blocked her from pitching. Jordan is upset with April for this, they argue, and April quits her job.

After Jordan realizes how terrible she's been to April and everyone who cares about her, she helps her friends at school perform at a pep rally. At first, they are booed by the crowd, but after a successful performance, they earn a round of applause and the respect of their peers. April finds the girl who turned Jordan into a girl and asks that she turn her back to normal; the attempt seemingly fails. Jordan, having changed inside, vows to be a better friend to April. Jordan wakes up the next morning restored to her adult self and returns to work with a respectful and positive attitude towards her employees. After several rejections, April's pitch scores a huge client. Jordan throws the company a party to celebrate the company's success with April's pitch, and April is given a well-deserved promotion to Creative Executive.

== Cast ==
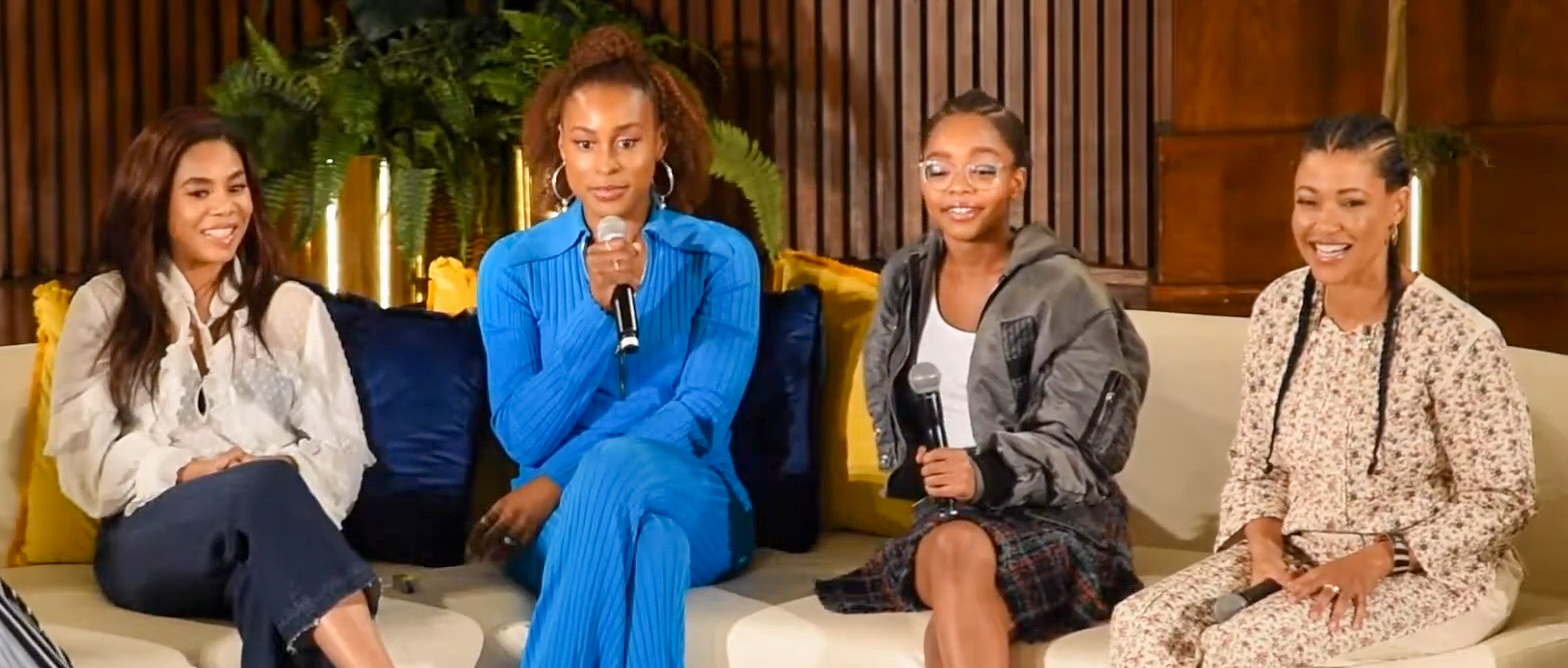
From left to right: Regina Hall, Issa Rae, Marsai Martin, and director Tina Gordon discussing the film at Spelman College

- Regina Hall as Jordan Sanders
  - Marsai Martin as Young Jordan Sanders
- Issa Rae as April Williams
- Tone Bell as Preston
- Mikey Day as Connor
- JD McCrary as Isaac
- Thalia Tran as Raina
- Tucker Meek as Devon
- Luke James as Trevor
- Rachel Dratch as Agent Bea
- Marc Hawes as Scott
- Justin Hartley as Garry Marshall
- Tracee Ellis Ross as Homegirl
- Palmer Williams Jr. as Police Officer

== Production ==
Marsai Martin, who stars on Black-ish, came to the show's creator, Kenya Barris with the idea for the film to set in 2014 when she was ten years old, having been inspired by the film Big (1988). Martin acted as an executive producer on Little, and at the age of 14 is the youngest person to ever hold that title on a major Hollywood production. Issa Rae signed onto the film on May 2, 2018, while Regina Hall, who was already attached as an executive producer, joined the cast later that month.

Principal photography took place June through August 2018 around Atlanta, Georgia.

== Music ==
On April 12, 2019, the film's soundtrack, Little: Original Motion Picture Soundtrack, was released by Back Lot Music. Several artists were featured on the album, including Mary J. Blige, Pharrell Williams, H.E.R., and Janelle Monáe. Chloe x Halle recorded the film's theme song, "Be Yourself", which was played during the end credits.

== Release ==
The film was released in New Haven on April 8, 2019, and it released in the United States on April 12, 2019. It had originally been slated for a September 20, 2019, release.

== Reception ==
=== Box office ===
Little grossed $40.7 million in the United States and Canada, and $8.1 million in other territories, for a worldwide total of $48.8 million, against a production budget of $20 million.

In the United States and Canada, the film was released alongside Hellboy, After and Missing Link, and was projected to gross $14–18 million from 2,667 theaters in its opening weekend. The film made $5.4 million on its first day, including $735,000 from Thursday night previews. It went on to debut to $15.5 million, finishing second, behind holdover Shazam!. The film made $8.5 million and $3.5 million in its second and third weekends, respectively, finishing fifth and seventh.

=== Critical response ===
On the review aggregator website Rotten Tomatoes, the film holds an approval rating of 46% based on 160 reviews, with an average rating of 5/10. The website's critical consensus reads, "A disappointingly uneven but overall agreeable spin on a familiar formula, Little benefits from a big heart – and a story that makes good use of its talented, well-matched cast." On Metacritic, the film has a weighted average score of 49 out of 100, based on 37 critics, indicating "mixed or average" reviews. Audiences polled by CinemaScore gave the film an average grade of "B+" on an A+ to F scale, while those at PostTrak gave it 4 out of 5 stars and a "definite recommend" of 62%.

Peter Debruge of Variety praised Rae and Martin's performances, and called the film an "amusing yet predictable body-swap comedy". The Guardian's Peter Bradshaw gave the film two out of five stars, saying that "[t]he comedy is fundamentally hobbled by the split in narrative focus between Jordan and April. We are never sure who is the heroine here, who has the comedy underdog status, who we are supposed to be rooting for." On February 26, 2020, Little was among the 26 films of 2019 awarded the ReFrame Stamp.

== See also ==
- Big (1988)
- New and Naani, India films inspired by Big
- Freaky Friday (2003)
- 13 Going on 30 (2004)
- 17 Again (2009)
- List of black films of the 2010s
