= Idara Victor =

American stage and television actress

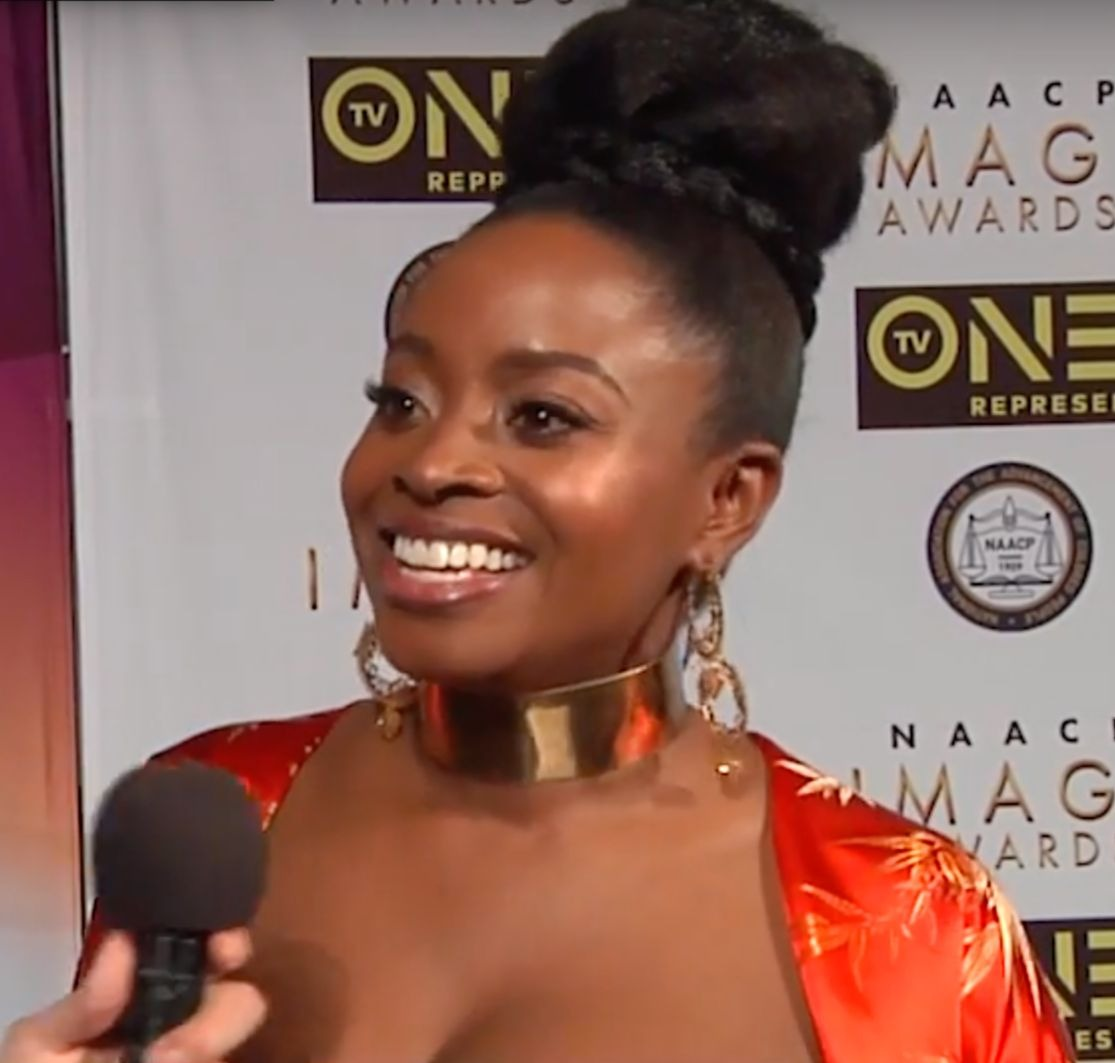
- Victor in 2017
- Born: December 6, 1980 (age 45); New York, New York, U.S.
- Education: Wharton School of Business; Lee Strasberg Theatre Institute
- Occupation: Actress
- Years active: 2004–present

Idara Victor is an American actress best known for her lead roles in Rizzoli & Isles and Turn: Washington's Spies.

== Early life and education ==
Idara Victor was born in Brooklyn, New York, to Barbara and Stan Victor, both from Akwa Ibom State in southern Nigeria, and she is the middle child of three girls, who grew up in Brooklyn and Long Island, New York. Victor "was probably the loudest of the siblings", and started dancing and playing piano at the age of eight, that led to her singing an opera aria for the first time at the age of 15 in a state competition and exhibition. At the age of 13, she won the Miss New York Junior Teen contest. She was discovered by an agent at a fashion show commitment, and pushed towards a career in modeling, but she intended to pursue an acting career.

After graduating high school, Victor enrolled in the undergrad program of the Wharton School of Business at the University of Pennsylvania, where she studied entrepreneurial management and marketing. With friends she performed plays in parks around Philadelphia and studied acting privately, going to a few professional auditions and booking work while she was home in New York on summer breaks.

At UPenn, she still performed Shakespeare readings and danced with the dance troupe African Rhythms West African ballet and Afro-Cuban dance in her free time. When Victor graduated, she left a job offer at InStyle magazine, started making music with her friend Mike "Double-O" (Kidz in the Hall), and began training at the Lee Strasberg Theatre Institute, a conservatory of the Tisch School of the Arts. She developed her artist community with many friends from the NYU program, and her friend Hyun Kim linked her up with the Nigerian-American actress Adepero Oduye for mentoring support. To finance her studies, Victor provided an online clothing store called Girled-Out, and also trained daily with actors from all over the world. As she watched Cate Blanchett in a movie, "the truth would grip me, I would think, I'm dying – my heart has definitely stopped, and if I don't get to get up there and do it too, I might as well just keep it off permanently."

== Career ==
=== Theatre ===
In New York City, John Caird introduced Victor into the New York theatre scene straight out of college, hiring her for her first Broadway show that fall, in the revival of Les Misérables – "an amazing thing I learned was that when I went on as Cosette, I was the first African-American woman to ever play the role in the show's 20 years of running".

Victor continued training and working in New York, and soon booked work over the next two years at The Public Theater (The Bacchae), Lincoln Center (Happiness), and the Roundabout Theater Company (The Tin Pan Alley Rag), to work with the directors Susan Stroman, Joanne Akalaitis, James Lapine, Stafford Arima and Tina Landau. Victor is a natural operatic soprano, also sang Joplin's ragtime opera Treemonisha, and performed at the 85th Academy Awards.

=== Television and film ===
While still in her studies, Victor first appeared on screen in the indie film Not Just Yet and her first television role was in the TV series Starved, playing opposite Sterling K. Brown. During her time as a cast member in Les Misérables, she also played recurring roles on Guiding Light and appeared on the television shows Law & Order, Law & Order: Special Victims Unit, All My Children and How to Make It in America.

After moving to Los Angeles, she appeared in television series including Mad Men, Private Practice, Grey's Anatomy, and Castle. She also played in recurring and lead roles in various television series, among them The Young and the Restless, Unicorn Plan-It, Vegas (2013) and Issa Rae's The Choir (2013). She performed live in New York in 2008 in a televised production of Camelot with the New York Philharmonic. In 2013, she performed onstage at the 85th Annual Academy Awards with the lead cast of the 2012 film Les Misérables.

From August 2014 to September 2016, she gained wider prominence as the character Nina Holiday, crime scene analyst and IT tech of the Boston Police Department, on the crime drama series Rizzoli & Isles. Victor became a member of the regular cast in season 6, replacing the late Lee Thompson Young. In addition to her role as Nina Holiday, Victor had a recurring role on the AMC drama Turn: Washington's Spies, from 2014 to 2017, and appeared in the 2016 productions Pure Genius and An American Girl Story. She appeared in the 2019 film Alita: Battle Angel from writer and producer James Cameron and director Robert Rodriguez, playing opposite Christoph Waltz.

As of 2022, she was a main cast member on the HBO Max series Minx.

== Filmography ==
=== Television ===
Year	Title	Role	Notes
2005	Starved	Adam's Dream Woman	1 episode
2006	Law & Order: Special Victims Unit	Iridia	1 episode
2006	All My Children	Airline Stewardess	1 episode
2008	Guiding Light	CO2 Waitress	2 episodes
2008	Live from Lincoln Center	Camelot Ensemble	1 episode
2009	Law & Order	Nona	1 episode
2010	How to Make It in America	Jeans Girl	1 episode
2010	The Young and the Restless	Bride	2 episodes
2011	Prime Suspect	Stephanie	1 episode
2012	Private Practice	Pilar Rodriguez	1 episode
2012–2013	Unicorn Plan-It	Ariel	2 episodes
2013	Vegas	Humphries	Recurring role; 3 episodes
2013	Mad Men	Nikki	1 episode
2013	Grey's Anatomy	Amelie Ward	1 episode
2013	The Choir	Miriam	Main cast; 8 episodes. Web series.
2014–2016	Rizzoli & Isles	Nina Holiday	Main cast; 42 episodes
2014–2017	Turn: Washington's Spies	Abigail / Agent 355	Recurring role; 18 episodes
2016	Castle	Patty	1 episode
2016	Pure Genius	Tanya Jackson	1 episode
2018	The Brave	Elena Bernal	1 episode
2018	Unsolved	Theresa Swann	2 episodes
2018	Love Is	Angela	9 episodes
2019	Shameless	Sarah	Recurring role; 4 episodes
2022–2023	Minx	Tina	Main cast
2024	Genius	Ollie Mae	1 episode

=== Film ===
Year	Title	Role	Notes
2004	Not Just Yet	Lania Caldwell	
2009	Safe Haven	Liv Samson	Short film
2012	Watching TV with the Red Chinese	Antigone	
2013	Hunter	Vampire (voice)	Short film
2016	An American Girl Story – Melody 1963: Love Has to Win	Frances Ellison	Direct-to-video
2019	Alita: Battle Angel	Nurse Gerhad	
