= Tina Gordon Chism =

American screenwriter, producer, and director

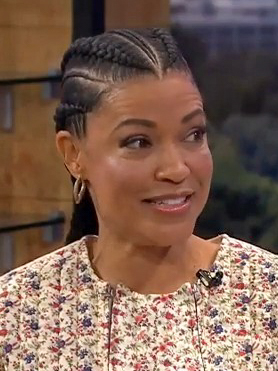
- Gordon promoting Little in 2019
- Occupations: Screenwriter; producer; director
- Years active: 2002–present

Tina Gordon Chism is an American screenwriter, producer, and director. She began her writing career writing the films ATL, and Drumline. She made her directorial debut in the 2013 film Peeples, which she also wrote. In 2019, she co-wrote the scripts to the comedies What Men Want and Little, while directing the latter. She wrote and directed the 2023 film, Praise This. She has also acted as a consulting producer on Good Girls.

Chism studied drama at Duke Ellington School for Performing Arts. She was inspired by The Cosby Show to tell stories of rich black families. In 2013, HBO greenlit a new series created by Chism called Crushed. In 2016, the pilot for Crushed was picked up by Hulu.
