= BET Award for Best Actress =

American entertainment award category

BET Awards for Best Actress
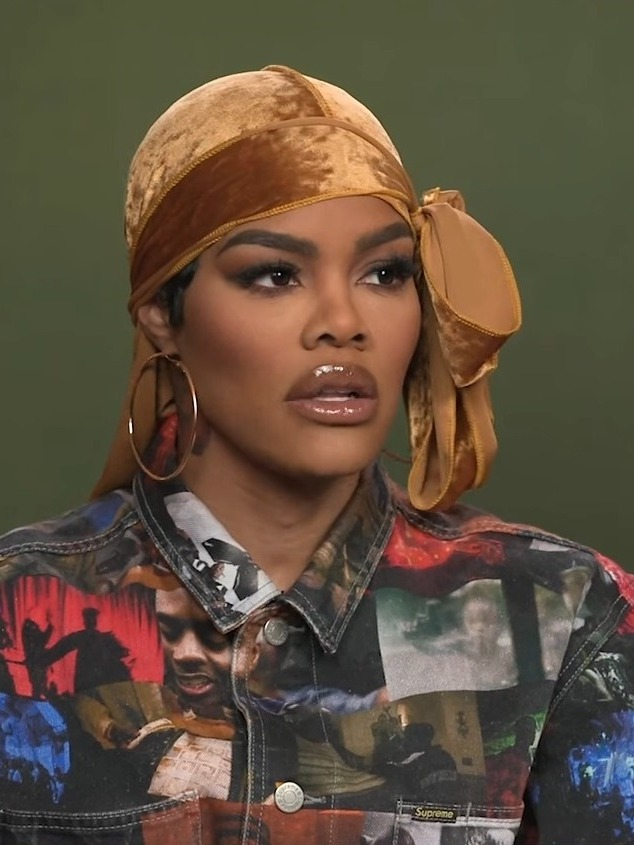
- Teyana Taylor is the most recent recipient
- Country: United States
- Presented by: BET Awards
- First award: 2001
- Currently held by: Teyana Taylor (2026)

Highlights
- Most wins: Taraji P. Henson (6)
- Most nominations: Angela Bassett (15)

The BET Award for Best Actress is awarded to actresses from both television and film. Some nominees have been nominated based on their performances in multiple bodies of work within the eligibility period. Taraji P. Henson holds the record for most wins in this category with six, while Angela Bassett holds the record for most nominations with fifteen.

== Winners and nominees ==
Winners are listed first and highlighted in bold.

=== 2000s ===
Year	Actress	Work	Ref
2001
2001	**Sanaa Lathan**	**Love & Basketball**	
2001	Aaliyah	Romeo Must Die	
2001	Angela Bassett	Boesman and Lena	
2001	Regina King	Down to Earth	
2002
2002	**Halle Berry**	**Monster's Ball and Swordfish**	
2002	Aaliyah	Queen of the Damned	
2002	Angela Bassett	The Rosa Parks Story and The Score	
2002	Vivica A. Fox	Boat Trip, Kingdom Come and Two Can Play That Game	
2002	Jada Pinkett Smith	Ali and Kingdom Come	
2003
2003	**Queen Latifah**	**Chicago, Bringing Down the House and Brown Sugar**	
2003	Halle Berry	Die Another Day	
2003	Sanaa Lathan	Brown Sugar	
2003	Nicole Ari Parker	Brown Sugar and Soul Food	
2003	Gabrielle Union	Cradle 2 the Grave and Deliver Us from Eva	
2004
2004	**Halle Berry**	**X2 and Gothika**	
2004	Beyoncé	The Fighting Temptations	
2004	Vivica A. Fox	Kill Bill Volume 1	
2004	Sanaa Lathan	Out of Time	
2004	Gabrielle Union	Bad Boys II	
2005
2005	**Regina King**	**Miss Congeniality 2: Armed & Fabulous and A Cinderella Story**	
2005	Halle Berry	Catwoman and Their Eyes Were Watching God	
2005	Kimberly Elise	The Manchurian Candidate and Woman Thou Art Loosed	
2005	Queen Latifah	Beauty Shop, The Cookout and Taxi	
2005	Gabrielle Union	Something The Lord Made and Breakin' All the Rules	
2006
2006	**Taraji P. Henson**	**Hustle & Flow, Something New and Four Brothers**	
2006	Tichina Arnold	Everybody Hates Chris	
2006	Queen Latifah	Last Holiday and Ice Age: The Meltdown	
2006	Thandie Newton	Crash	
2006	Alfre Woodard	Desperate Housewives and Something New	
2007
2007	**Jennifer Hudson**	**Dreamgirls**	
2007	Tichina Arnold	Everybody Hates Chris	
2007	Angela Bassett	Akeelah and the Bee	
2007	Kerry Washington	The Last King of Scotland and I Think I Love My Wife	
2007	Chandra Wilson	Grey's Anatomy	
2008
2008	**Halle Berry**	**Perfect Stranger and Things We Lost in the Fire**	
2008	Angela Bassett	Meet the Browns	
2008	Queen Latifah	Hairspray, The Perfect Holiday and Mad Money	
2008	Jill Scott	Why Did I Get Married?	
2008	Chandra Wilson	Grey's Anatomy	
2009
2009	**Taraji P. Henson**	**The Curious Case of Benjamin Button, Not Easily Broken and The Family That Preys**	
2009	Beyoncé	Cadillac Records and Obsessed	
2009	Angela Bassett	ER and Notorious	
2009	Rosario Dawson	Eagle Eye and Seven Pounds	
2009	Jennifer Hudson	The Secret Life of Bees and Sex and the City	

=== 2010s ===
Year	Actress	Work	Ref
2010
2010	**Mo'Nique**	**Precious**	
2010	Taraji P. Henson	Date Night and I Can Do Bad All by Myself	
2010	Regina King	Southland	
2010	Zoe Saldaña	Avatar and Star Trek	
2010	Gabourey Sidibe	Precious	
2011
2011	**Taraji P. Henson**	**Taken from Me: The Tiffany Rubin Story and The Karate Kid**	
2011	Halle Berry	Frankie and Alice	
2011	Regina King	Southland	
2011	Zoe Saldaña	Death at a Funeral and The Losers	
2011	Kerry Washington	For Colored Girls and Night Catches Us	
2012
2012	**Viola Davis**	**Extremely Loud & Incredibly Close and The Help**	
2012	Angela Bassett	Jumping the Broom and Green Lantern	
2012	Taraji P. Henson	Person of Interest and Larry Crowne	
2012	Regina King	Southland	
2012	Zoe Saldaña	Colombiana	
2013
2013	**Kerry Washington**	**Django Unchained and Scandal**	
2013	Angela Bassett	Betty and Coretta and Olympus Has Fallen	
2013	Halle Berry	The Call	
2013	Taraji P. Henson	Person of Interest and Think Like a Man	
2013	Gabrielle Union	Think Like a Man	
2014
2014	**Lupita Nyong'o**	**12 Years a Slave**	
2014	Angela Bassett	American Horror Story: Coven	
2014	Gabrielle Union	Being Mary Jane	
2014	Kerry Washington	Scandal	
2014	Oprah Winfrey	The Butler	
2015
2015	**Taraji P. Henson**	**Empire**	
2015	Viola Davis	How to Get Away with Murder	
2015	Tracee Ellis Ross	Black-ish	
2015	Gabrielle Union	Being Mary Jane	
2015	Kerry Washington	Scandal	
2016
2016	**Taraji P. Henson**	**Empire**	
2016	Viola Davis	How to Get Away with Murder	
2016	Tracee Ellis Ross	Black-ish	
2016	Gabrielle Union	Being Mary Jane	
2016	Kerry Washington	Scandal	
2017
2017	**Taraji P. Henson**	**Hidden Figures and Empire**	
2017	Viola Davis	Fences	
2017	Janelle Monáe	Hidden Figures	
2017	Issa Rae	Insecure	
2017	Gabrielle Union	Being Mary Jane	
2018
2018	**Tiffany Haddish**	**Girls Trip**	
2018	Angela Bassett	Black Panther and 9-1-1	
2018	Issa Rae	Insecure	
2018	Taraji P. Henson	Empire	
2018	Lupita Nyong'o	Black Panther and Star Wars: The Last Jedi	
2018	Letitia Wright	Black Panther	
2019
2019	**Regina King**	**If Beale Street Could Talk and Seven Seconds**	
2019	Issa Rae	Insecure and Little	
2019	Regina Hall	The Hate U Give and Little	
2019	Taraji P. Henson	Empire	
2019	Tiffany Haddish	The Last O.G.	
2019	Viola Davis	How to Get Away with Murder and Widows	

=== 2020s ===
Year	Actress	Work	Ref
2020
2020	**Issa Rae**	**Insecure, The Photograph & The Lovebirds**	
2020	Angela Bassett	9-1-1 and A Black Lady Sketch Show	
2020	Cynthia Erivo	Harriet	
2020	Regina King	Watchmen	
2020	Tracee Ellis Ross	black-ish	
2020	Zendaya	Euphoria (season 1) and Spider-Man: Far From Home	
2021
2021	**Andra Day**	**The United States vs. Billie Holiday**	
2021	Angela Bassett	9-1-1 and Soul	
2021	Issa Rae	Insecure	
2021	Jurnee Smollett	Birds of Prey and Lovecraft Country	
2021	Viola Davis	How to Get Away with Murder and Ma Rainey's Black Bottom	
2021	Zendaya	Euphoria ("Trouble Don't Last Always") and Malcolm & Marie	
2022
2022	**Zendaya**	**Euphoria (season 2) and Spider-Man: No Way Home**	
2022	Aunjanue Ellis	King Richard	
2022	Coco Jones	Bel-Air	
2022	Issa Rae	Insecure	
2022	Jennifer Hudson	Respect	
2022	Mary J. Blige	Power Book II: Ghost	
2022	Queen Latifah	The Equalizer	
2022	Quinta Brunson	Abbott Elementary	
2022	Regina King	The Harder They Fall	
2023
2023	**Angela Bassett**	**9-1-1 and Black Panther: Wakanda Forever**	
2023	Coco Jones	Bel-Air	
2023	Janelle James	Abbott Elementary	
2023	Janelle Monáe	Glass Onion: A Knives Out Mystery	
2023	Keke Palmer	Human Resources and Nope	
2023	Viola Davis	The Woman King	
2023	Zendaya		
2024
2024	**Regina King**	**Shirley**	
2024	Angela Bassett	9-1-1 and Damsel	
2024	Ayo Edebiri	The Bear, Bottoms, Spider-Man: Across the Spider-Verse, Teenage Mutant Ninja Turtles: Mutant Mayhem and Theater Camp	
2024	Coco Jones	Bel-Air	
2024	Danielle Brooks	The Color Purple	
2024	Fantasia	The Color Purple	
2024	Halle Bailey	The Little Mermaid and The Color Purple	
2024	Issa Rae	American Fiction, Barbie and Spider-Man: Across the Spider-Verse	
2025
2025	**Cynthia Erivo**	**Wicked**	
2025	Andra Day	The Deliverance	
2025	Angela Bassett	9-1-1 and Zero Day	
2025	Coco Jones	Bel-Air	
2025	Keke Palmer	One of Them Days	
2025	Kerry Washington	The Six Triple Eight and Unprisoned	
2025	Quinta Brunson	Abbott Elementary	
2025	Viola Davis	G20	
2025	Zendaya	Challengers and Dune: Part Two	
2026
2026	**Teyana Taylor**		
2026	Angela Bassett		
2026	Quinta Brunson		
2026	Ayo Edebiri		
2026	Cynthia Erivo		
2026	Regina Hall		
2026	Chase Infiniti		
2026	Coco Jones		
2026	Keke Palmer		

== Multiple wins and nominations ==
=== Wins ===
6 wins

- Taraji P. Henson

3 wins

- Halle Berry
- Regina King

=== Nominations ===
15 nominations

- Angela Bassett

11 nominations

- Taraji P. Henson

9 nominations

- Regina King

8 nominations

- Viola Davis
- Gabrielle Union

7 nominations

- Halle Berry
- Issa Rae
- Kerry Washington

5 nominations

- Coco Jones
- Queen Latifah
- Zendaya

3 nominations

- Quinta Brunson
- Cynthia Erivo
- Jennifer Hudson
- Sanaa Lathan
- Keke Palmer
- Tracee Ellis Ross
- Zoe Saldaña

2 nominations

- Aaliyah
- Tichina Arnold
- Beyoncé
- Andra Day
- Ayo Edebiri
- Vivica A. Fox
- Regina Hall
- Tiffany Haddish
- Janelle Monáe
- Lupita Nyong'o
- Teyana Taylor
- Chandra Wilson

=== Other notables ===
The following individuals have had a career in music as well as being nominated for the BET Best Actress award:

- Aaliyah
- Halle Bailey
- Mary J. Blige
- Andra Day
- Cynthia Erivo
- Fantasia
- Jennifer Hudson
- Coco Jones
- Beyoncé Knowles
- Queen Latifah
- Janelle Monáe
- Lupita Nyong'o
- Keke Palmer
- Tracee Ellis Ross
- Zoe Saldaña
- Jada Pinkett Smith
- Jill Scott
- Teyana Taylor
- Zendaya

Oscar-nominated and Oscar-winning actresses who have also been nominated for or won the BET Best Actress Award:

- Angela Bassett
- Halle Berry
- Mary J. Blige
- Danielle Brooks
- Viola Davis
- Andra Day
- Aunjanue Ellis-Taylor
- Cynthia Erivo
- Taraji P. Henson
- Jennifer Hudson
- Regina King
- Queen Latifah
- Mo'Nique
- Lupita Nyong'o
- Zoe Saldaña
- Gabourey Sidibe
- Teyana Taylor
- Oprah Winfrey
- Alfre Woodard

== See also ==
- BET Award for Best Actor
