= Amy Aniobi =

Nigerian-American writer and producer

- Born: August 28, 1984 (age 42); North Texas, U.S.
- Education: Stanford University (BA)
- Occupations: Writer; producer
- Years active: 2011–present
- Notable work: Insecure

Amy Aniobi (born August 28, 1984) is an American writer, producer and director. She was the head writer and co-executive producer of Insecure and was also an executive producer for the HBO special 2 Dope Queens. Aniobi signed a two-year overall deal with HBO in 2019.

In January 2024, Aniobi was nominated at the 55th NAACP Awards in the Outstanding Directing in a Comedy Series category for directing credits on Netflix’s Survival of the Thickest .

== Life and career ==
Aniobi was raised in north Texas, the daughter of Nigerian immigrants. She developed her interest in writing during her college years. Aniobi received her bachelor's degree in American Studies from Stanford University.

Aniobi is the head writer for HBO's Insecure, as well as an executive producer. She is a long-time collaborator of creator Issa Rae, a fellow student from Stanford. Aniobi was a writer for Rae's web series The Misadventures of Awkward Black Girl. She is also an executive producer for another HBO series, 2 Dope Queens.

Aniobi signed a two-year overall deal with HBO in 2019. As a part of that deal, she is writing the limited series The Dolls with Issa Rae and Laura Kittrell. She is also developing the comedy series Attachment with Reese Witherspoon and Melanie Chandra.

Aniobi is also developing film content, and forthcoming films include American Princess for Fox, and two productions for Universal Pictures, Bye Bye Bye and Love in America. She and Rae are co-producers for Love In America, a musical comedy feature. Aniobi is co-writing the screenplay with Khiyon Hursey and Harrison Richlin.

In 2021, Aniobi created a networking program called Tribe, that provides screenwriter skillsharing and professional development information for entertainment industry professionals.

Aniobi is an executive producer for Enjoy Your Meal, an upcoming workplace comedy series based in part on the allegations of institutional racism at Bon Appétit that emerged in June 2020. She most recently launched her production company SuperSpecial, and renewed her overall deal with HBO Max. In 2022 it was announced that Aniobi will develop a television series adaptation for the forthcoming novel The Nigerwife by Vanessa Walters.

== Awards and nominations ==
- 2019 – OkayAfrica, 100 Women

Award	Year	Category	Nominated work	Result	Ref.
Ambies	2021	Best Scriptwriting, Fiction	Looking for Latoya	Nominated	
Black Reel Awards	2017	Outstanding Comedy Series	Insecure	Nominated	
Black Reel Awards	2020	Outstanding Comedy Series	Insecure	Won	
Primetime Emmy Awards	2020	Outstanding Comedy Series	Insecure	Nominated	
Writers Guild of America Awards	2016	Comedy Series	Silicon Valley	Nominated	
