= Moonface =

Moonface may refer to:

- The iconographic tradition of depicting the Moon with a face, see Moon § Cultural representation
- The Man in the Moon
- Moon face, a medical sign where the face swells up into a rounded shape
- "Moon-Face", a short story by Jack London
- Moonface, a fictional character in Enid Blyton's The Magic Faraway Tree series
- Saint Walker's nickname by Kilowog in Green Lantern: The Animated Series
- Bert Newton, Australian television presenter
- Jason Cundy, English former association football player and Radio and Television presenter
- Moonface Martin, a fictional gangster in Cole Porter's 1934 hit musical Anything Goes and the title character of a short spinoff 2008 independent film, Moonface
- Moonface, a music project by Canadian musician Spencer Krug
- Moonface (French: Face de Lune), a 1992 graphic novel by Alejandro Jodorowsky and François Boucq
- Moonface (podcast), 2019 fiction podcast

== See also ==
- Man in the Moon (disambiguation)
