= Fruit (podcast) =

Podcast by Issa Rae

Fruit is a podcast created by Issa Rae and distributed on Howl. The series is an audio drama about a football player who is exploring his sexuality while trying to navigate the hypermasculine culture of the NFL.

== Background ==
The show debuted in February 2016. The episodes were released every Wednesday exclusively on Howl. Each episode is roughly 20 minutes in length. The show consists of two seasons. The series is told in a first-person retrospective narration. The podcast was originally released behind Howl's paywall, but was re-released outside of the paywall about a year later. Midroll Media incorporated product placement into the script of the show for Mailchimp.

Issa Rae created the show shortly before becoming well known for shows like Insecure. Benoni Tagoe and Deniese Davis were executive producers for the show. The story follow an anonymous football player who goes by "X" and is voiced by Roderick Davis. The story follows a rookie football player attempting to navigate his professional career in the hypermasculine environment of the NFL while also trying to figure out his own sexuality. The show explores how homophobic locker room conversations contribute to a culture of hypermasculinity. The Guardian compared the story to that of Michael Sam, however, Fruit is purely fictional and not based on any real life events.

== See also ==
- List of LGBTQ podcasts
