= List of LGBTQ podcasts =

The following is a list of LGBTQ podcasts.

== List ==
| Podcast | Year | Starring, Narrator(s), or Host(s) | Produced by | Ref |
|---|---|---|---|---|
| Not Well | 2019–present | Bobby & Jim | Independent | |
| Cerebro | 2020–present | Connor Goldsmith | Independent | |
| The Log Books | 2019–present | Tash Walker, Adam Zmith and Shivani Dave | Independent | |
| Food 4 Thot | 2017–present | Denne Michele Norris, Joseph Osmundson, Tommy Pico, and Fran Tirado | Stitcher | |
| Gay Travel Today With Sagitravel | 2020–present | | Sagitravel | |
| Dyking Out | 2017–present | Carolyn Bergier and Melody Kamali | Independent | |
| Making Gay History | 2020–present | Sara Burningham | Independent | |
| Queer Talk | 2020–2023 | Podcast hosted by Mufseen Miah & Spencer Cooper | Independent | |
| Queer News | 2021–present | Weekly podcast hosted by Anna DeShawn | E3 Radio | |
| Throwing Shade | 2020–present | Erin Gibson and Bryan Safi | Independent | |
| Ramble Redhead | | | | |
| Out Here in America | 2017–2018 | Justin Mitchell | McClatchy Audio Lab | |
| History is Gay | 2017–present | Leigh and Gretchen | Independent | |
| #QueerAF | 2016–present | Jamie Wareham | Independent | |
| Catlick | | | | |
| A Gay and Non Gay | 2015–present | James Barr and Dan Hudson | Independent | |
| The Laverne Cox Show | 2021–present | Laverne Cox | iHeartRadio and Shondaland Audio | |
| Still Processing | 2016–present | Wesley Morris and Jenna Wortham | The New York Times | |
| FANTI | 2020–present | Tre'vell Anderson and Jarrett Hill | Maximum Fun | |
| Getting Curious | 2015–present | Jonathan Van Ness | Earwolf | |
| HIM | 2017–present | Malik, Stevie, Trey, Aaron Trotman, and LaQuann Dawson | Independent | |
| Queery | 2017–present | Cameron Esposito | Earwolf | |
| Always Here | | | | |
| Keep It | 2017–present | Ira Madison III, Louis Virtel, and Aida Osman | Crooked Media | |
| Nancy | 2017–2020 | Kathy Tu and Tobin Low | WNYC Studios | |
| We're Having Gay Sex | 2020–present | Ashley Gavin | Studio71 | |
| Parental Guidance | 2021–present | Ademola Falomo | Independent | |
| Citizen Diversity | | | | |
| The Deviant's World | 2020–present | Dr. Eric Cervini | Independent | |
| I'm Grand Mam | 2019–present | Kevin Twomey and PJ Kirby | Independent | |
| Outward:Slate's LGBTQ podcast | 2018–present | Bryan Lowder, Jules Gill-Peterson, and Christina Cauterucci | The Slate Group | |
| The Penumbra Podcast | 2016–present | Harley Takagi Kaner and Kevin Vibert | Hyperion City Productions | |
| Tan France's Queer Icons | | | | |
| Call Me Mother | 2021–present | Shon Faye | Novel | |
| Bad Gays | 2019–present | Huw Lemmey & Ben Miller | Independent | |
| Savage Lovecast | 2006–present | Dan Savage | Index Newspapers | |
| Love and War | | 2020 | The Independent | |
| Outspoken Voices – a Podcast for LGBTQ+ Families | 2017–present | Emily McGranachan and Dakota Fine | Family Equality | |
| NB | | Caitlin Benedict | | |
| Being LGBTQ | 2019–present | Sam Wise | Being LGBTQ | |
| Moonface | 2019 | James Kim, Joel Kim Booster, and Esther Moon | Independent | |
| Sounds Fake But Okay | 2017–present | Sarah Costello, Kayla Kaszyca | | |
| The Magnus Archives | 2016–2021 | Jonathan Sims, Alexander J. Newall | Rusty Quill | |
| Fruit | 2016 | Issa Rae | Midroll Media | |
| The Bald and the Beautiful | 2020–present | Trixie and Katya | Studio71 | |
| Queen of Hearts | 2022–present | Jujubee | Jujubee, Wondery, Amazon Music, and Rococo Punch | |
| Hard Launch | 2025–present | Dan and Phil | Studio71 | |
| Full Circle (the Podcast) with Charles Tyson, Jr. and Martha Madrigal | 2022-present | Charles Tyson, Jr. and Martha Madrigal | NeverSkurred Productions | |
