= The Misadventures of Awkward Black Girl (book) =

2015 book by Issa Rae

- First edition
- Author: Issa Rae
- Language: English
- Genre: Memoir
- Publisher: 37 INK
- Publication date: 2015
- Publication place: United States

The Misadventures of Awkward Black Girl is a 2015 memoir written by Issa Rae. In the book, Rae chronicles her life through a series of humorous autobiographical essays and stories. The book's title is taken from Rae's popular web series of the same name, often simply referred to as Awkward Black Girl (2013–2015). Upon release, the book became a New York Times best-seller.
