= QueerAF =

UK-based podcast and online newspaper published as a newsletter on LGBTQ topics

- Company type: Community Interest Company
- Website type: Podcast, Online newspaper & Newsletter
- Available in: English
- Founded: June 2016
- Headquarters: {{{location_country}}}
- Founder: Jamie Wareham
- Website: www.wearequeeraf.com

QueerAF is a British online podcast and newspaper published in the format of a periodical newsletter covering LGBTQ topics.

The podcast was created by Jamie Wareham in June 2016 and has won multiple awards since its inception.

The organization formally incorporated as a Community Interest Company in 2021, dedicating its assets to support the LGBTQ community. The organization is regulated by the British independent media regulator Impress that oversees independent press in the United Kingdom.

== Podcast ==
QueerAF
- Genre: LGBTQ
- Country of origin: United Kingdom
- Language: English

Creative team
- Developed by: Acast

Production
- Length: ~30 minutes

Publication
- No. of episodes: 53
- Original release: 20 June 2016

Related
- Website: Official Website

The first episode of the QueerAF podcast aired on 20 June 2016 with creator Jamie Wareham and Hatti Smart hosting transgender activist Charlie Craggs. At its creation, the podcast ran as the National Student Pride podcast.

The podcast changed its name after four seasons which ran from 2016 to 2020 to the now current name QueerAF for its fifth season that started in 2024 and being hosted by Acast.

The podcast has received a series of awards and recognitions since its inception for its coverage on LGBTQ topics.

=== Spin-off podcasts ===
==== What The Pox? ====
In 2022, QueerAF published a special series called What The Pox discussing Monkeypox, hosted by British Comedian Martin Joseph who detailed his own experience of contracting it. The podcast was recognized by the World Health Organization in its efforts to help raise awareness for Monkeypox.

==== The Other Blue Pill ====
In May 2024, QueerAF launched a special series spin-off podcast titled The Other Blue Pill, in reference to the color of the common Pre-exposure prophylaxis for HIV prevention (PrEP) pill. The podcast discusses the history of HIV prevention in the UK. The series is hosted by Phil Samba and was released as six episodes between May 2024 and July 2024, with a seventh special live episode that aired in September 2024.

== Organization and online newsletter ==
The organization incorporated as a Community Interest Company in 2021, dedicating its assets to the public interest supporting the LGBTQ community, with founder Jamie Wareham acting as its director.

QueerAF is regulated by the British Independent Monitor for the Press (Impress). IMPRESS oversees independent local, investigative and special interest news publications across the UK and is the country's first legally recognized press regulatory body under the royal Press Recognition Panel.

Through the incorporation, QueerAF is funding emerging and underrepresented queer creatives, and support them as their careers grow and launched its weekly newsletter in addition to the existing podcast.

QueerAF formed a partnership with Inclusive Journalism Cymru in July 2023 to commission articles for QueerAF's newsletter and support LGBTQ writers in Wales through mentorship and publishing of commissioned newsletter articles.

== Trans+ History Week ==
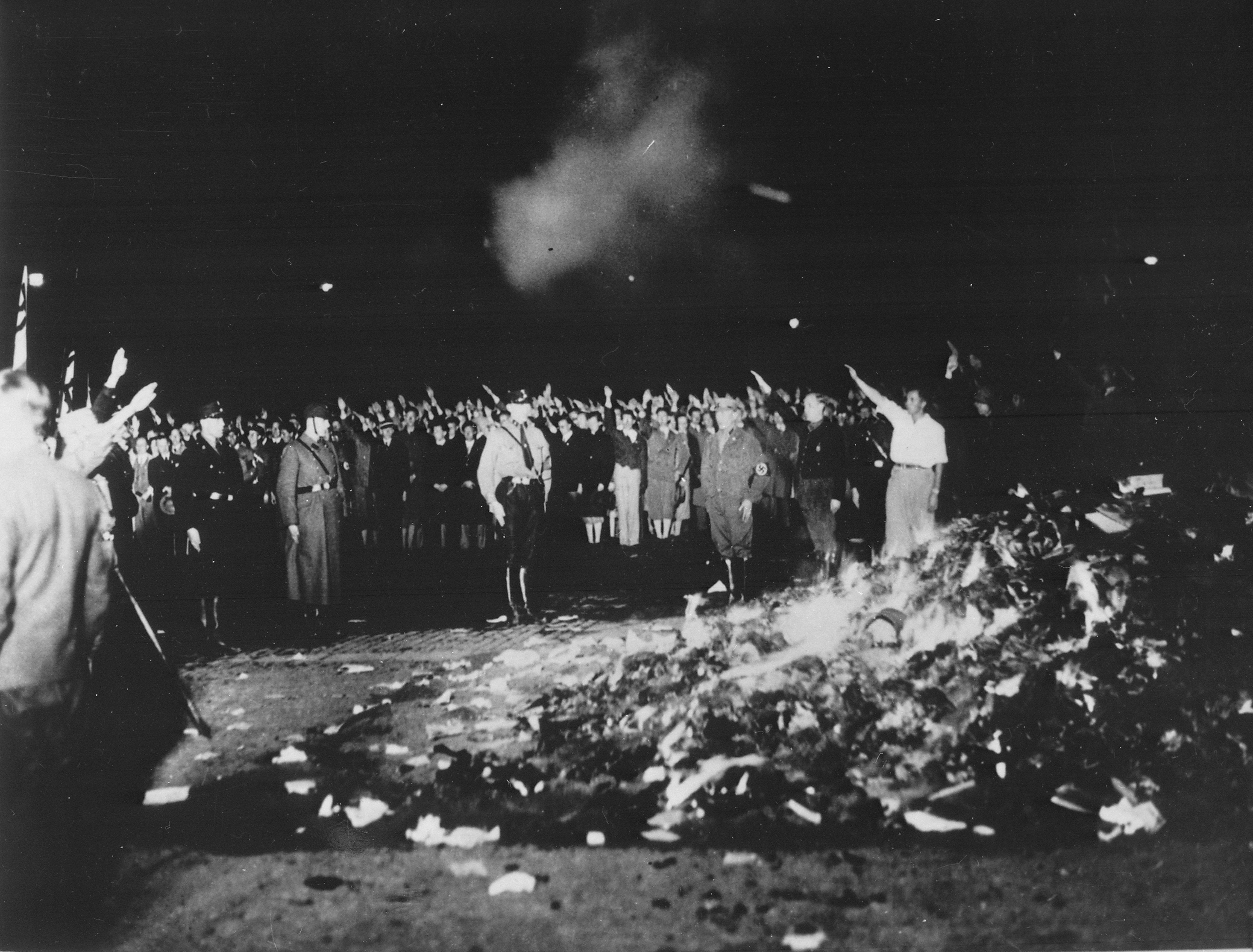
Nazi Party members at the Opernplatz book burning in Berlin

In May 2024, QueerAF started the first Trans+ History Week, observed for the week of 6 May 2024 – 12 May 2024 to celebrate the history of transgender, non-binary, gender-nonconforming, and intersex people. The organization hosted billboards across the UK with the slogan "Always been here. Always will be."

Marty Davies, the founder of Trans+ History Week, told Pink News they got the idea after learning about the Nazi book burnings that targeted trans texts on 6 May 1933 after a raid on the Institut für Sexualwissenschaft in Berlin.

Along with banners and online promotions, the organization released a series of educational materials on their website on transgender history.

== Awards and recognitions ==
=== Awards ===
- In 2020, the QueerAF podcast was a bronze winner for the Moment Of The Year category of the British Podcast Awards.
- In 2021, QueerAF was shortlisted for an Impact Award by the British Audio and Radio Industry Awards.
- In 2022, QueerAF won an award for Best Equalities publication by the British Independent Media Association.

=== Recognitions ===
- In 2020, the podcast was featured in a list by the British Attitude magazine titled "The best LGBTQ, gay and queer podcasts to listen to during #Queerantine".
- In 2021, the podcast was featured in a list of "10 LGBTQ Podcasts For Anyone Who's Currently The Q (Questioning) In LGBTQ" by BuzzFeed.
- In 2022, the podcast was featured in a list of "13 LGBTQ Podcasts You Should Be Listening To" by PR Newswire.
- In 2024, the QueerAF podcast was recognizes by Cosmopolitan as one best LGBTQ podcasts to listen to.

== See also ==
- List of LGBTQ podcasts
