= Sweet Life: Los Angeles =

California-based reality television series in the United States

- Genre: Reality television
- Created by: Issa Rae
- Starring: Amanda Scott; Briana Jones; Cheryl Des Vignes; Jerrold Smith II; Myami Woods; Candiss Hart; P'Jae Compton; Tylynn Burns; Rebecca Magett; Rob Lee; Jaylenn Hart
- Country of origin: United States
- Original language: English
- No. of seasons: 2
- No. of episodes: 20

Production
- Executive producers: Issa Rae; Montrel McKay; Jimmy Fox; Sheri Maroufkhani; Leola Westbrook; Sun de Graaf
- Producers: Rajah Ahmed; Pyongson Yim; Pyongson "Sunny" Yim
- Production location: Los Angeles, California
- Production companies: Hoorae Productions; Main Event Media; Morning Dew Pictures

Original release
- Network: HBO Max
- Release: August 19, 2021 – August 18, 2022

Sweet Life: Los Angeles is an American reality television series created by Issa Rae. It premiered on August 19, 2021, on HBO Max. In October 2021, it was renewed for a second season which premiered on August 4, 2022. In December 2022, the series was canceled after two seasons.

The series is scheduled to air on OWN beginning on June 13, 2025, with new footage incorporated.

== Background ==
Sweet Life was inspired by both the Frank Ocean song after which it is named, and the BET reality television show Baldwin Hills. The show follows a close group of African American friends in their 20s as they live in South Los Angeles and pursue their personal and professional goals. Their shared experiences and mutual support connect the group.

== Cast ==
Profession and age of cast members when the first season premiered:

- Amanda Scott - PR professional, 25
- Briana Jones - Health care professional, 26
- Cheryl Des Vignes - Fashion designer, 26
- Jerrold Smith II - Marketing specialist, 25
- Jordan Bentley (Season 1) - Streetwear designer, 24
- Myami Woods - (Season 2; guest Season 1) - Paralegal, Business Owner
- Candiss Hart - (Season 2; guest Season 1) - Financial Consultant with boyfriend Keilan Horton
- Keilan Horton - (Season 2; guest Season 1) - Financial Leader, antagonist 28
- P'Jae Compton - Artist manager, 29
- Tylynn Burns - Event planner, 26
- Rebecca Magett (Season 2; recurring season 1) - Bri's bestie and P'Jae's on-again-off-again love interest.
- Rob Lee (Season 2; recurring season 1) - Amanda's boyfriend, who quit his full-time job to pursue comedy.
- Jaylenn Hart (Season 2; recurring season 1) - Tylynn's boyfriend who wants kids but not marriage., 27

== Episodes ==
| Season | Episodes | Originally released | |
| Season | Episodes | First released | Last released |
|---|---|---|---|
| 1 | 10 | August 19, 2021 | September 9, 2021 |
| 2 | 10 | August 4, 2022 | August 18, 2022 |

=== Season 1 (2021) ===
| No. overall | No. in series | Title | Original release date |
|---|---|---|---|
| 1 | 1 | "Sweet Life" | August 19, 2021 |
| 2 | 2 | "Good Vibes Only" | August 19, 2021 |
| 3 | 3 | "You Got Me F**ked Up" | August 19, 2021 |
| 4 | 4 | "A Seat at the Table" | August 26, 2021 |
| 5 | 5 | "Moving In, Moving Out, Moving On" | August 26, 2021 |
| 6 | 6 | "Once Upon a Time in Sexico" | August 26, 2021 |
| 7 | 7 | "No Cabo Cuddles" | September 2, 2021 |
| 8 | 8 | "Low-Key Privileged" | September 2, 2021 |
| 9 | 9 | "Are We Even Friends?" | September 2, 2021 |
| 10 | 10 | "The Group Chat" | September 9, 2021 |

=== Season 2 (2022) ===
| No. overall | No. in series | Title | Original release date |
|---|---|---|---|
| 11 | 1 | "Ain't Sh*t Sweet" | August 4, 2022 |
| 12 | 2 | "The Good, the Bad, and the Medium Ugly" | August 4, 2022 |
| 13 | 3 | "Tylynn & the Termites" | August 4, 2022 |
| 14 | 4 | "Accents & Good Times" | August 4, 2022 |
| 15 | 5 | "Y'all Weird AF" | August 11, 2022 |
| 16 | 6 | "B*tch, What's the Tea?" | August 11, 2022 |
| 17 | 7 | "Spring BAEcation" | August 11, 2022 |
| 18 | 8 | "Two B's, No F*cks" | August 18, 2022 |
| 19 | 9 | "Have You Really Have, Though?" | August 18, 2022 |
| 20 | 10 | "Wait, that's it?!" | August 18, 2022 |

== Awards ==
In 2022, the first season was nominated for an NAACP Image Award for Outstanding Reality Program, Reality Competition or Game Show, and a Guild of Music Supervisors Awards for Best Music Supervision in Reality Television.
