= Seen & Heard: The History of Black Television =

American documentary series

- Genre: Documentary
- Directed by: Giselle Bailey; Phil Bertelsen
- Country of origin: United States
- Original language: English
- No. of episodes: 2

Production
- Executive producers: Issa Rae; Montrel McKay; John Maggio; Rachel Dretzin; John Ealer; Jonathan Berry; Dave Becky; Nancy Abraham; Lisa Heller; Sara Rodriguez
- Producers: Giselle Bailey; Phil Bertelsen
- Production companies: HBO Documentary Films; Ark Media; Hoorae Media

Original release
- Network: HBO
- Release: September 9 – September 10, 2025

Seen & Heard: The History of Black Television is a 2025 American documentary miniseries directed and produced by Giselle Bailey and Phil Bertelsen. It explores the history of African-American representation in Hollywood, showcasing creators and artists who shaped it. Issa Rae serves as an executive producer.

It had its world premiere at the 2025 South by Southwest Film & TV Festival on March 8, 2025. It premiered September 9, 2025, on HBO.

== Premise ==
Explores African-American representation in Hollywood, showcasing creators and artists who shaped it. Issa Rae, Oprah Winfrey, Tyler Perry, Shonda Rhimes, Ava DuVernay, Lena Waithe, Cord Jefferson, Tracee Ellis Ross, Swizz Beatz and Norman Lear appear in the series.

== Production ==
In August 2020, it was announced Phil Bertelsen would direct a documentary revolving around African-American representation in Hollywood, with Issa Rae set to executive produce and HBO Documentary Films producing and distributing.

== Release ==
It had its world premiere at the 2025 South by Southwest Film & TV Festival on March 8, 2025. It also screened at the American Black Film Festival on June 13, 2025.
