= Hoorae Media =

American media production company

- Formerly: Issa Rae Productions (2011–20)
- Type: Private
- Industry: Entertainment
- Predecessor: Issa Rae Productions
- Founded: September 2020; 6 years ago in Inglewood, California, U.S.
- Founder: Issa Rae
- Headquarters: Inglewood, California, U.S.
- Key people: Sara Rastogi; Montrel McKay
- Products: Motion pictures Television programs Audio content
- Services: Film production; Television production; Audio production
- Owner: Issa Rae (CEO)
- Number of employees: 23 (2021)
- Website: hoorae.co

Hoorae Media (pronounced "hooray") is an American independent media production company founded by Issa Rae in September 2020. Formerly known as Issa Rae Productions, the company launched as an umbrella brand to unify Rae's various film, television, and digital ventures. Hoorae has produced Insecure, A Black Lady Sketch Show, and Rap Shit, in collaboration with HBO. Upcoming projects include the television adaptation of Brit Bennett novel The Vanishing Half and the film Sinkhole, co-produced with Monkeypaw Productions and Universal Pictures.

== History ==
Founded in September 2020, Hoorae was created to consolidate Issa Rae multiple media ventures under one banner. The company includes film and television divisions, Raedio (an audio content platform launched in 2019), ColorCreative (a management agency), and a range of digital brands. In March 2021 Rae signed a five-year, $40 million agreement with HBO, HBO Max, and Warner Bros. granting the companies exclusive television rights and a first-look arrangement for film projects WarnerMedia brands for any film projects.

Sara Rastogi was promoted to senior vice president, with Rae as CEO and Montrel McKay as president of Hoorae Film and TV. Originally known as Issa Rae Productions, the company opened its first office in Inglewood, California in 2019. As of March 2021, Hoorae employed 23 people.

In 2024, Hoorae partnered with Velvet Hammer Media to produce a slate of television series, led by Jennifer O’Connell and Rebecca Quinn, who previously co-produced Sweet Life: Los Angeles and Project Greenlight: A New Generation.

== Filmography ==
=== Television ===
| Year(s) | Title | Co-producers | Network |
|---|---|---|---|
| 2016–2021 | Insecure | Penny For Your Thoughts Entertainment, 3 Arts Entertainment and HBO Entertainment | HBO |
| 2019–2023 | A Black Lady Sketch Show | For Better or Words Inc., 3 Arts Entertainment, Jax Media and HBO Entertainment | HBO |
| 2021–2022 | Sweet Life: Los Angeles | Main Event Media and Morning Dew Pictures | HBO Max |
| 2022–2023 | Rap Shit | District 8 Productions and 3 Arts Entertainment | HBO Max (season 1); Max (season 2) |
| 2023–present | Project Greenlight: A New Generation | 3 Arts Entertainment, Miramax Television and Alfred Street Industries | Max |
| 2025 | Seen & Heard: The History of Black Television | HBO Documentary Films and Ark Media | HBO |
| TBA | Tre Cnt | HBO Entertainment | HBO |
| TBA | The Vanishing Half | HBO Entertainment | HBO |
| TBA | Nice White Parents | HBO Entertainment | HBO |
| TBA | Untitled scripted series with Mark Phillips | N/A | Max |
| TBA | The Gang's All Queer: The Lives of Gay Gang Members | 3 Arts Entertainment and HBO Entertainment | HBO |

=== Film ===
| Year | Title | Co-producers | Distributor |
|---|---|---|---|
| 2025 | One of Them Days | TriStar Pictures, MACRO, ColorCreative, Big Boss | Sony Pictures Releasing |
| TBA | Perfect Strangers | Spyglass Media Group, Eagle Pictures and 3 Marys Entertainment | TBA |
| TBA | Good People, Bad Things | MRC, Present Company Inc. | TBA |
| TBA | Ghost in the Machine | Heyday Films | Netflix |
| TBA | Sinkhole | Monkeypaw Productions | Universal Pictures |
| TBA | Juju | La La Anthony | Universal Pictures |
