= Vanessa Walters =

English novelist and playwright (born 1978)

- Born: 1978 (age 46–47); London, England
- Education: Queen's College, London
- Alma mater: University College London
- Occupation(s): Novelist, playwright and critic
- Notable work: Rude Girls
- Website: www.vanessawalters.net

Vanessa Walters (born 1978, in London, United Kingdom) is an English novelist and playwright. She is also a commentator and critic. She is best known as the teenage novelist discovered to be writing a novel as a hobby to share with her school friends while she was being educated at Queen's College, London. When discovered by teachers, the text was passed over to a literary agent, who quickly had Walters signed to a publishing company with a five-figure book deal even before she had left school.

The book, Rude Girls, made her a success, but instead of diving headlong into the literary world she continued her studies, progressing to studying law at University College London. About Rude Girls, she said: "It was a book I really wanted to read, which didn't exist."

Rude Girls was acclaimed as an accurate portrayal of life in the North London Black community—it was a huge success straight across the board. While studying law, Walters found time to spend a year in Paris, France, and continue her writing. Her book The Best Things in Life was published in 1998 and explored the lives of young Black women struggling to balance friendship, work and relationships.

Her 2008 book Smoke Othello! is a collection of poems, short stories and plays about black experience in West London, born out of her time as the Writer in Residence for the Royal Borough of Kensington and Chelsea. Walters also performs her poetry, and she has written plays, with her works including Too Hot to Handle, Cold World, Caribbean Kitchen, Double Take, Changes and Michael X, produced by various English theater companies. Her commentary has also appeared on the guardian.co.uk website.

Her reviews have been broadcast on BBC Radio 4's Front Row, as well as Sky News, BBC Four (Television), The World, More4 (The Cinema Show) and Colourful Radio.

Her articles have been published in The Guardian, New Statesman, The Voice and other outlets, including Pride Magazine, for which she writes a monthly column on topical issues for black women.

On 2 May 2023, her debut novel, The Nigerwife was published by Atria Books (A Simon and Schuster imprint). The book centers on a young woman who goes missing in Lagos, Nigeria, and her estranged auntie who will stop at nothing to find the truth. The Nigerwife was selected as the Good Morning America's May Book Club Pick. Amy Aniobi is developing an adaptation for the novel which has been optioned for a limited series by HBO.
