= The Nigerwife =

2023 novel by Vanessa Walters

- Author: Vanessa Walters
- Language: English
- Genre: Thriller; Mystery
- Publisher: Atria Books
- Publication date: 2 May 2023
- Publication place: United Kingdom
- Pages: 320
- ISBN: 9781804946459

The Nigerwife is a 2023 novel by British writer Vanessa Walters. It was published on 2 May 2023 by Atria Books. The book centers on a young woman who goes missing in Lagos, Nigeria, and her estranged auntie who will stop at nothing to find the truth.

== Reception ==
The novel received generally positive reception. It was recommended by various media outlets.

The Nigerwife was selected as the "Good Morning America's" May Book Club Pick.

== Television adaptation ==
Amy Aniobi is developing an adaptation for the novel which has been optioned for a limited series by HBO
