= Hilltop Coffee + Kitchen =

Independent coffee chain in Southern California

Coordinates: 33.9643°N 118.3530°W

- Founded: 2018; 7 years ago
- Founder: Yonnie Hagos, Ajay Relan
- Headquarters: Oakland, California, US
- Area served: Los Angeles Metro
- Key people: Hagos; Relan; Issa Rae
- Website: www.findyourhilltop.com

Hilltop Coffee + Kitchen is a Los Angeles-based independent coffee chain. A Black-owned business, it was founded in 2018 by Yonnie Hagos and Ajay Relan. Issa Rae later joined Hagos and Relan as a partner and co-owner.

The first Hilltop Coffee + Kitchen was opened in 2018. Located in the South Los Angeles neighborhood of View Park, it was the only coffee shop of its kind in the area. Relan said: “Part of our mission is to be able to create an inclusive, energetic space that provides a hub for the local community."

In 2019, Hilltop Coffee + Kitchen opened its flagship location in Inglewood and in 2020, a branch in Eagle Rock. In 2023, a pop-up turned permanent location opened in downtown Los Angeles as well as a shared location in LAX Terminal 7 with Randy's Donuts. Hilltop Coffee + Kitchen locations are primarily staffed by locals.

== Additional images ==
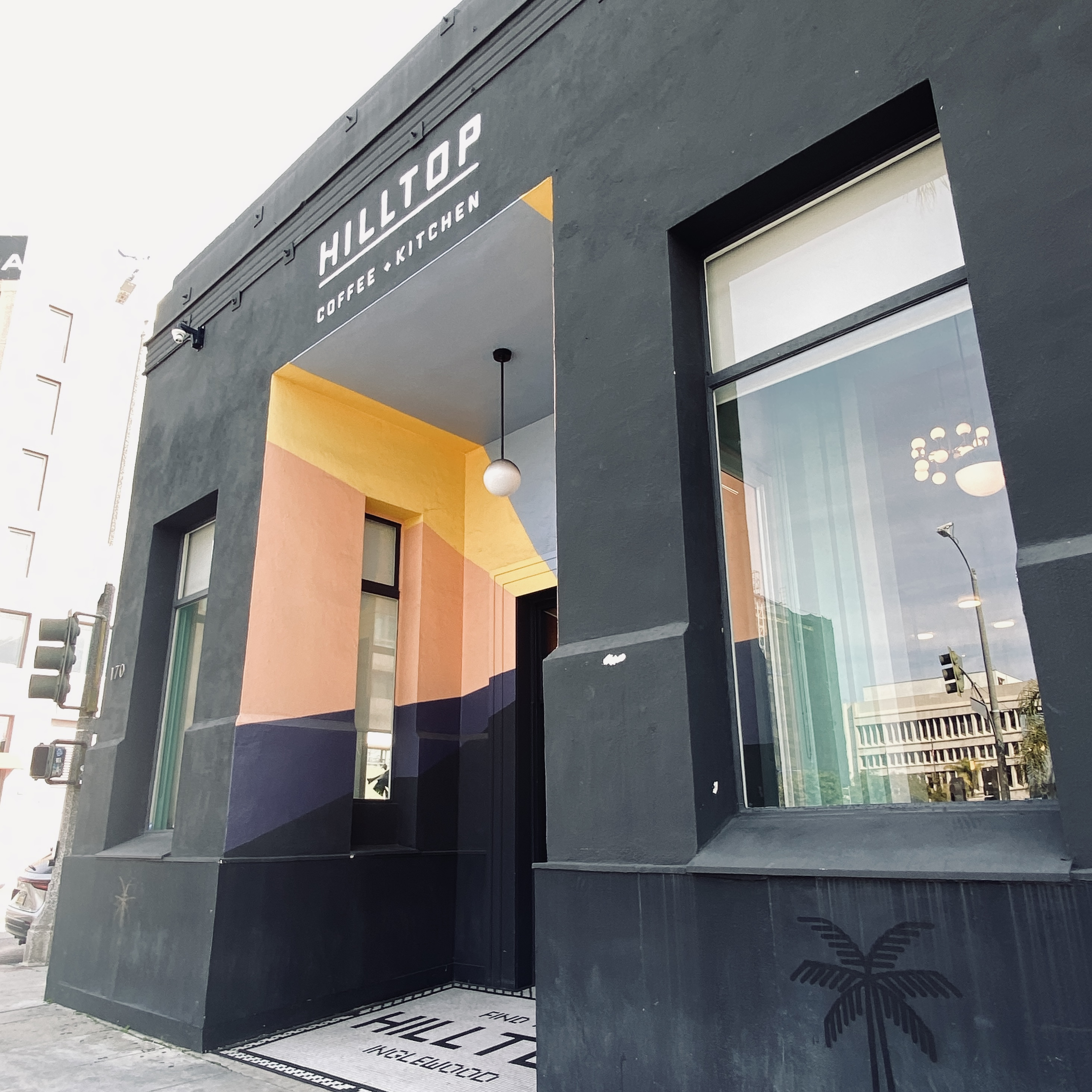
Hilltop Coffee on La Brea in Inglewood
