= The Log Books =

Podcast about LGBTQ history in the UK

The Log Books is a podcast about British LGBT history.

== Background ==
The podcast goes through the stories found in the archives of the London Lesbian and Gay Switchboard. The switchboard was run by volunteers who kept handwritten notes. The podcast is hosted by Tash Walker, Adam Smith and Shivani Dave. The podcast did a live event.

== Reception ==
Alice Florence Orr wrote in Podcast Review that the podcast is "a moving and valuable record of social history." Fiona Sturges wrote in the Financial Times that the podcast is "a remarkable memorial to those who paved the way towards future freedom". The show won best new podcast at the 2020 British Podcast Awards.

== See also ==
- List of LGBTQ podcasts
