= The Photograph (2020 film) =

2020 film by Stella Meghie

- Theatrical release poster
- Directed by: Stella Meghie
- Written by: Stella Meghie
- Produced by: James Lopez; Will Packer
- Starring: Issa Rae; Lakeith Stanfield; Lil Rel Howery; Rob Morgan; Courtney B. Vance
- Cinematography: Mark Schwartzbard
- Edited by: Shannon Baker Davis
- Music by: Robert Glasper
- Production companies: Perfect World Pictures; Will Packer Productions
- Distributed by: Universal Pictures
- Release date: February 14, 2020
- Running time: 106 minutes
- Country: United States
- Language: English
- Budget: $16–28 million
- Box office: $21 million

The Photograph is a 2020 American romantic drama film written and directed by Stella Meghie. It follows the estranged daughter (Issa Rae) of a famous photographer who falls in love with the journalist (LaKeith Stanfield) who is investigating her late mother's life. Chelsea Peretti, Lil Rel Howery and Courtney B. Vance also star.

The film was released in the United States on February 14, 2020, by Universal Pictures. It received generally favorable reviews from critics and grossed $21 million.

== Plot ==
In the present day, Reporter Michael Block meets a man in Louisiana named Isaac to interview him about his life post-Hurricane Katrina. He takes an interest in one particular photo in Isaac's home of a woman named Christina Eames, and wants to know her backstory.

Christina's daughter Mae inherits a safety deposit box upon her death which includes the same picture of herself and two letters. The first is to Mae and the second is for her to deliver to her father.

Back in New York, Michael meets Mae who works as an assistant curator. She pulls Christina's archival material to show him.

Attracted to Mae, Michael intentionally sets up a "chance meeting" with her at the French movie screening her gallery is showing. They flirt and decide to go on their first date, ending with a kiss. They begin to date but this coincides with Michael getting a job in London. He struggles to tell Mae about the move as their relationship is new, so begins to ignore her calls.

In the past, Christina has a flirtatious friendship with Isaac. Eventually, they begin to live together but she is bored of her life as she longs to pursue a career in photography. Without telling Isaac, Christina gets on a bus leaving for New York City, and gets a job as an assistant photographer. She calls her friend Denise to give her the good news, who tells her that her mother has died. At the funeral, Christina mentions that she is going to visit Isaac, but Denise tells her that he married shortly after she left.

A few years later, Christina returns to her hometown with Mae. They take a photograph in her old home. While there, they run into Isaac who offers to bring them to dinner to meet his wife. Christina refuses and becomes very emotional, kissing Isaac's cheek and crying afterwards which Mae remembers, even as an adult.

In the present day, Mae meets Isaac and delivers the letter Christina wrote, letting him know that her letter revealed him as her biological father. He admits to suspecting it when he met Mae as a child, but was too afraid to ask Christina.

Michael goes to meet Isaac to finish his article and is surprised to see Mae there. They spend the day together and at the end Michael tells her that he got a job in London. He will be leaving soon but would like to continue the relationship. Mae tells him long distance isn't practical. She then works on putting together a retrospective of her mother's work and finds a video where her mother says she wishes she had been better at loving people.

While working in London, Michael gets an invitation from Mae to see a Kendrick Lamar concert. They meet up in NYC, where Mae finally confesses her feelings for him and they vow to work things out despite the distance.

== Cast ==
- Issa Rae as Mae Morton
  - Dakota Paradise as Young Mae Morton
- LaKeith Stanfield as Michael Block
- Kelvin Harrison Jr. as Andy Morrison
- Chanté Adams as Christina Eames
- Jasmine Cephas Jones as Rachel Miller
- Lil Rel Howery as Kyle
- Teyonah Parris as Asia
- Rob Morgan as Isaac Jefferson
  - Y'lan Noel as Young Issac Jefferson
- Courtney B. Vance as Louis Morton
- Chelsea Peretti as Sara Rodgers
- Maxwell Whittington-Cooper as Peter Thomas
- Marsha Stephanie Blake as Violet Eames
- Wakeema Hollis as Denise Holness
- Phoenix Noelle as Sophia
- Rylee Gabrielle King as Sandrine

== Production ==
It was announced in March 2019 that Issa Rae and LaKeith Stanfield would star in the film, with Stella Meghie writing and directing. Chelsea Peretti, Kelvin Harrison Jr., Chanté Adams, Jasmine Cephas Jones, Y'lan Noel, Lil Rel Howery, Teyonah Parris, Rob Morgan, and Courtney B. Vance were added to the cast shortly after.

Principal photography began on April 25, 2019, taking place around New Orleans.

== Release ==
The Photograph was released in the United States on February 14, 2020, by Universal Pictures. It was released on Blu-ray and DVD on May 12, 2020.

== Reception ==
=== Box office ===
In the United States and Canada, the film was released alongside Fantasy Island, Sonic the Hedgehog and Downhill, and was projected to gross $12–15 million from 2,516 theaters in its opening weekend. The film made $6.3 million on its first day, including $650,000 from Thursday night previews. It debuted to $13.4 million, finishing fourth at the box office. The film dropped 77% in its second weekend to $2.8 million, finishing 10th.

=== Critical response ===
On Rotten Tomatoes, the film holds an approval rating of 75% based on 111 reviews, with an average rating of 6.6/10. The website's critics consensus reads: "Gorgeous visuals, an affecting love story, and simmering chemistry between Issa Rae and Lakeith Stanfield keep The Photograph solidly in focus." On Metacritic, the film has a weighted average score of 62 out of 100, based on 27 critics, indicating "generally favorable reviews". Audiences polled by CinemaScore gave the film an average grade of "B+" on an A+ to F scale, and PostTrak reported it received an average 3 out of 5 stars, with 49% of people saying they definitely would recommend it.

Issa Rae's performance was appreciated by critics, earning a nominations at the 52nd NAACP Image Awards for Outstanding Actress in a Motion Picture and the 46th People's Choice Awards for Drama Movie Star of 2020.
