= Insecure (TV series) =

American comedy-drama television series

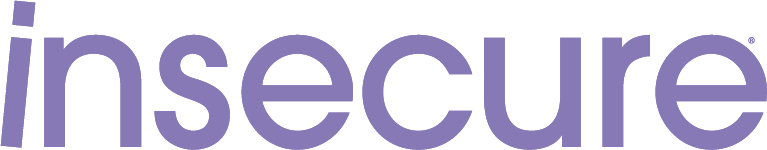
- Genre: Comedy drama
- Created by: Issa Rae; Larry Wilmore
- Based on: Awkward Black Girl by Issa Rae
- Showrunner: Issa Rae
- Starring: Issa Rae; Yvonne Orji; Jay Ellis; Lisa Joyce; Natasha Rothwell; Amanda Seales; Y'lan Noel; Alexander Hodge; Kendrick Sampson; Leonard Robinson; Courtney Taylor
- Composer: Raphael Saadiq
- Country of origin: United States
- Original language: English
- No. of seasons: 5
- No. of episodes: 44

Production
- Executive producers: Issa Rae; Prentice Penny; Michael Rotenberg; Melina Matsoukas; Dave Becky; Jonathan Berry
- Production locations: Los Angeles, California: primarily View Park–Windsor Hills and Leimert Park; Inglewood; Malibu; Santa Monica
- Cinematography: Ava Berkofsky
- Camera setup: Single-camera
- Running time: 27–41 minutes
- Production companies: Issa Rae Productions (2016–2020); Hoorae Media (2020–2021); Penny for Your Thoughts Entertainment; 3 Arts Entertainment; HBO Entertainment

Original release
- Network: HBO
- Release: October 9, 2016 – December 26, 2021

Related
- Awkward Black Girl

Insecure is an American comedy-drama television series created by Issa Rae and Larry Wilmore, and is partially based on Rae's acclaimed web series Awkward Black Girl. The series is about the awkward experiences of a contemporary African-American woman. The series premiered online on September 23, 2016, via HBO Now and HBO Go, before airing weekly on HBO from October 9, 2016.

Insecure received critical acclaim since its debut in 2016. In 2017, the American Film Institute selected it as one of the top 10 television programs of the year. In 2020, the series received eight Primetime Emmy Award nominations for its fourth season, including Outstanding Comedy Series. For her performance on the series, Rae received three Golden Globe Award nominations for Best Actress – Television Series Musical or Comedy, in addition to three Emmy nominations for Outstanding Lead Actress in a Comedy Series (2018, 2020 and 2022). Yvonne Orji received an Emmy nomination for Outstanding Supporting Actress in a Comedy Series in 2020 for her performance in the series.

Insecure ran for five seasons. The series finale aired on December 26, 2021.

== Background ==
On August 6, 2013, Rae began working on a comedy series pilot with co-creator Larry Wilmore. The show was planned to be about the awkward experiences of a contemporary African-American woman, and the pair eventually settled on the current title of Insecure. HBO picked up the pilot on October 15, 2015, and it was subsequently greenlit for production.

At HBO's 2016 Television Critics Association session, which featured Rae, showrunner Prentice Penny, and executive producer Melina Matsoukas, Issa Rae explained that the series will examine "the complexities of 'Blackness' and the reality that you can't escape being Black." She also mentioned, in regard to the potential mainstream reaction to the series:

We're just trying to convey that people of color are relatable. This is not a hood story. This is about regular people living life.

Raphael Saadiq created original music for the first season. Solange Knowles served as music consultant for the show and was introduced by Matsoukas, who directed the music video for Knowles's song "Losing You".

On November 14, 2016, HBO renewed the show for a second season which premiered on July 23, 2017. On August 8, 2017, HBO renewed the show for a third season, which premiered on August 12, 2018. On September 6, 2018, HBO renewed the series for a fourth season which premiered on April 12, 2020. On May 1, 2020, the series was renewed for a fifth season. On January 13, 2021, HBO announced that the fifth season will be its last. The fifth and final season premiered on October 24, 2021.

== Plot ==
The first season depicts the Black female experience from the perspective of two female protagonists, Issa (Issa Rae) and Molly (Yvonne Orji), who have been best friends since their college days at Stanford University. Both in their late 20s, they navigate career and relationship experiences while living in their hometown of South Los Angeles, California. The two share a close bond, and throughout the show, they deal with internal struggles, their friendship and the black community. Issa works at a non-profit that benefits middle-school aged students of color called "We Got Y'all". She struggles to reignite the passion in her relationship with her long-term boyfriend, Lawrence (Jay Ellis), who has been slacking in their relationship since his start-up company failed. Molly is a corporate attorney who has career success but difficulty with dating men. The half-hour series explores social and racial issues that relate to the contemporary American experience.

== Cast ==
=== Main ===
- Issa Rae as Issa Dee
- Yvonne Orji as Molly Carter
- Jay Ellis as Lawrence Walker
- Lisa Joyce as Frieda (seasons 1–3; guest star, season 5)
- Natasha Rothwell as Kelli Prenny (seasons 2–5; recurring, season 1)
- Amanda Seales as Tiffany DuBois (seasons 2–5; recurring, season 1)
- Y'lan Noel as Daniel King (seasons 2–3; recurring, season 1)
- Alexander Hodge as Andrew Tan (season 4; recurring, season 3)
- Kendrick Sampson as Nathan Campbell (seasons 4–5; recurring, season 3)
- Leonard Robinson as Taurean Jackson (season 5; recurring, seasons 3–4)
- Courtney Taylor as Sequoia "Quoia" (season 5; recurring, season 4)

=== Recurring ===
- Neil Brown Jr. as Chad Kerr
- Catherine Curtin as Joanne (seasons 1–3)
- Mason McCulley as Ken (seasons 1–3)
- Veronica Mannion as Kitty (seasons 1–3)
- Sujata Day as Sarah (seasons 1–3; guest star, season 5)
- Wade Allain-Marcus as Derek DuBois
- Langston Kerman as Jared (seasons 1, 3)
- DomiNque Perry as Tasha (seasons 1–2)
- Kathreen Khavari as Patricia (seasons 1–3)
- Tristen J. Winger as Thug Yoda
- Maya Erskine as Diane Nakamura (seasons 1–2)
- Heather Mazur as Hannah Richards-Foster (seasons 1–2)
- Tiana Le as Dayniece (season 1)
- Denise Dowse as Dr. Rhonda Pine (seasons 2–5)
- Sarunas J. Jackson as Alejandro 'Dro' Peña (seasons 2–3, 5)
- Spencer Garrett as John Merrill (season 2)
- Jean Elie as Ahmal Dee (seasons 2–5)
- Lil Rel Howery as Quentin (season 2)
- Jasmine Kaur as Aparna (season 2)
- Leon Thomas as Eddie (season 2)
- Samantha Cope as Brooke (season 2)
- Don Franklin as Malcolm (season 3)
- Erika Alexander as Yolanda (season 3)
- Tyrone Evans Clark as a Guest Star (seasons 4–5)
- Christina Elmore as Condola Hayes (seasons 4–5)
- Norman Towns as Bennett (seasons 4–5)
- Kofi Siriboe as Crenshawn (season 5)
- Chinedu Unaka as Omari (seasons 5)

== Episodes ==
| Season | Episodes | Originally released | |
| Season | Episodes | First released | Last released |
|---|---|---|---|
| 1 | 8 | October 9, 2016 | November 27, 2016 |
| 2 | 8 | July 23, 2017 | September 10, 2017 |
| 3 | 8 | August 12, 2018 | September 30, 2018 |
| 4 | 10 | April 12, 2020 | June 14, 2020 |
| 5 | 10 | October 24, 2021 | December 26, 2021 |

=== Season 1 (2016) ===
| No. overall | No. in season | Title | Directed by | Written by | Original release date | U.S. viewers (millions) |
|---|---|---|---|---|---|---|
| 1 | 1 | "Insecure as Fuck" | Melina Matsoukas | Issa Rae & Larry Wilmore | October 9, 2016 (Note: The first episode was released online on September 23, 2016, two weeks before the series premiere.) | 0.371 |
After a disappointing 29th birthday, Issa Dee starts doubting her relationship with her unemployed boyfriend, Lawrence. Her successful best friend, Molly, is struggling with being single. When Issa hears from an old ex, Daniel, she takes Molly with her to an open-mic-night in the hopes of reconnecting with her old flame. Molly meets Jared, whose brother is performing at the open mic-night. Issa performs the rap "Broken Pussy", based on Molly's romantic life, to impress Daniel which causes a fight between the friends. After leaving the club, Issa gets a text from Daniel and decides to meet up with him despite Molly's disapproval. Issa and Daniel kiss but he lets her know that he is not looking for a relationship after she brings the subject up.
| 2 | 2 | "Messy as Fuck" | Cecile Emeke | Issa Rae | October 16, 2016 | 0.458 |
While Issa decides to become the "No Fucks" version of herself, Molly decides to treat herself to a day of pampering. Lawrence continues to worry about Issa's absence as she ignores him and even has an awkward encounter with her at Rite Aid while she is buying a pack of underwear. The next day, Issa botches her work presentation that she failed to prepare for but later comes up with a beach clean-up event with her coworker Frieda. Molly later runs into Jared, the cute guy she met at the open mic-night, after a disappointing date and makes a connection with him. Issa returns home and apologizes to Lawrence for ignoring him.
| 3 | 3 | "Racist as Fuck" | Melina Matsoukas | Dayna Lynne North | October 23, 2016 | 0.469 |
Lawrence and Issa have a hard time returning to their old ways. Lawrence learns that he might have to take a lower-entry job and Issa overhears her coworkers bad-mouthing her beach day event behind her back. Molly brings Jared to a party to meet her friends and finds out that he never attended college, unlike her and her group of friends. Jared admits his interest in Molly after the party. Molly later decides to end things with Jared when she gets accepted into "The League", a highly exclusive dating app. Issa's beach clean-up event is a huge success and proves her coworkers wrong. When Issa returns home, she finds Lawrence cooking dinner and begins to reminisce about the good times they shared in the apartment. They finally share official apologies to each other.
| 4 | 4 | "Thirsty as Fuck" | Kevin Bray | Laura Kittrell | October 30, 2016 | 0.348 |
Issa and Lawrence are now on good terms which is shown on their shopping trip for a new couch. Molly quickly finds a new date from "The League" after scaring off Michael, her first suitor from the app. Daniel shows up at Issa's job to apologize for how things left off. She later asks him to present at her Career Day when their speaker for the arts drops out. Molly sparks a connection with her new date by explaining how her bosses asked her to speak to a black intern. Daniel tells Issa's class about her rapping talent and they find a YouTube video of her rapping "Broken Pussy".
| 5 | 5 | "Shady as Fuck" | Melina Matsoukas | Ben Dougan | November 6, 2016 | 0.329 |
Issa freaks out about the kids discovering her video and enlists help to take it down. Molly is enjoying her new guy, Chris, and invites him to her coworker's engagement party for the evening. While Molly calls Jared to find out who posted the video, Issa visits Daniel to do the same. Chris arrives at the party but upsets Molly when he admits that he only came because she "needed a win." Daniel encourages Issa to attempt a freestyle in his studio, professes his feelings for her, and they proceed to have sex. Molly shows up to Jared's apartment drunk after the party and spends the night on his couch.
| 6 | 6 | "Guilty as Fuck" | Debbie Allen | Amy Aniobi | November 13, 2016 | 0.388 |
Issa is struggling with her guilt for sleeping with Daniel and has flashbacks of being with him while trying to be intimate with Lawrence. Molly mends fences with Jared. Issa overcompensates in her relationship with Lawrence, due to her guilt of cheating and works on ignoring Daniel. At work, Issa manages to get her boss to agree to hold a fundraiser in their city instead of Malibu. Molly informs Issa that she and Jared are now back together. While Issa and Lawrence are out for their date night, Lawrence takes her to a jewelry store to try on engagement rings, triggering more flashbacks to her night with Daniel. Jared and Molly take turns sharing stories from their past and he admits that he has been with a man in the past. Molly informs her friends about her concerns about Jared's past and Issa tries to ease Molly's worries. However, Molly is unable to cope with Jared's past and breaks up with him. Issa informs Molly about her and Daniel. Molly advises her to move on. Issa goes home and has sex with Lawrence. On his way to the bathroom, Lawrence discovers Issa's phone and sees a text from Daniel.
| 7 | 7 | "Real as Fuck" | Kevin Bray | Prentice Penny | November 20, 2016 | 0.382 |
Issa goes out shopping for a fundraiser dress with Molly, and informs her that she is going to be more focused on her work and her relationship. Molly runs into an old friend who discloses that she has been going to therapy and has been working on fixing herself and how she values herself. Lawrence goes on an interview and gets a job offer. Lawrence informs Issa about the job offer but also confides his idea to not take the job to continue working on his app "Woot-Woot". Issa tells him to take the job offer and work on programming his app at night. Molly helps Issa set up for her fundraiser and tells her about running into Crystal and the conversation she had with her. Molly knocks therapy, and Issa makes an argument that Molly may benefit from therapy. Issa is successful at her fundraiser, while Molly's behavior is questionable. Daniel arrives at the fundraiser and is intercepted by Molly. Issa tries to make Daniel leave and is seen by Lawrence. Molly and Issa get in a fight at the fundraiser and Molly leaves. Molly shows up at Jared's house and tries to mend fences. Lawrence asks Issa about Daniel and leaves after she admits to the affair.
| 8 | 8 | "Broken as Fuck" | Melina Matsoukas | Issa Rae | November 27, 2016 | 0.565 |
Issa tries to apologize to Lawrence, who rejects her. Molly is still not talking to Issa. The four girls go to Malibu. Lawrence goes out with his friends. Kelli and Tiffany both gang up on Molly about her love life, but Issa defends her. Tiffany outs Issa on her relationship with Lawrence. Lawrence, while at the strip club, finally calls Issa and says they should talk. Molly and Issa mend fences when she drives Issa back home to see Lawrence. Issa arrives home to discover that Lawrence packed his things and left his key behind.

=== Season 2 (2017) ===
| No. overall | No. in season | Title | Directed by | Written by | Original release date | U.S. viewers (millions) |
|---|---|---|---|---|---|---|
| 9 | 1 | "Hella Great" | Melina Matsoukas | Issa Rae | July 23, 2017 | 1.118 |
Picking up a few months after the events of the previous season, Issa starts going on dates through different dating apps but daydreams about reconciling with Lawrence. Molly is seeing a therapist. Lawrence is dating Tasha, the bank teller, but only spends weekends with her. During the week, he stays with his friend Chad while he hunts for an apartment. Issa and her coworkers are having a difficult time getting students at a new school assignment interested in their after-school program. Molly accidentally receives her white colleague, Travis' paystub, and learns he is paid way more. Molly questions if the partners value her at the law firm. Issa checks the mail and Lawrence has a jury duty notice. She texts him and he responds he will be by after work to get it. Issa plans an impromptu 'wine-down' party so Lawrence can see she is doing good without him. Lawrence takes Tasha out on a real date. He texts Issa to mail the jury notice to him. Kelly invites Issa's neighbors to the party and a fire starts in her kitchen. The next day while Issa and Freida are set up in the library, two students show up and ask questions to distract while other students steal the snacks. Later that night, Lawrence shows up to Issa's apartment to get his mail and they proceed to have sex.
| 10 | 2 | "Hella Questions" | Melina Matsoukas | Amy Aniobi | July 30, 2017 | 1.293 |
Issa tries to make sense of her encounter with Lawrence. Lawrence confesses to Tasha he slept with Issa. After her therapist gives Molly some harsh truths, Molly attempts to join the office "boys club". Issa and Freida meet with the school's vice principal and while he recruits students to fill the program, Freida has concerns that he is racist against the Latino students and only wants the black students to receive help and resources.
| 11 | 3 | "Hella Open" | Marta Cunningham | Dayna Lynne North | August 6, 2017 | 1.158 |
Issa becomes sexually frustrated. Molly meets a potential match while on a girls' night out with Issa. Lawrence leaves Tasha's family cookout and chooses to spend all day with his colleagues.
| 12 | 4 | "Hella LA" | Prentice Penny | Laura Kittrell | August 13, 2017 | 1.300 |
Issa runs into Daniel at a day party. Also, the guy, Felix, she was supposed to meet up with at the day party is not into her at all. Molly's childhood friend, Dro, tells her he has an open marriage and propositions her for sex. Kelly meets a man at the day party and tells Molly and Issa they are meeting back up at a restaurant. Issa sees Daniel at the restaurant but does not speak. While Kelly is being fingered underneath the table, Daniel texts Issa and Issa moves to sit next to him. Lawrence makes an illegal u-turn and is pulled over by the cops. He drops his card while getting out his driver's license so when he checks out at the grocery store, he does not have a card to pay for his groceries. The two women behind him in line offer to pay, and take him to their apartment for a threesome. When he can't get hard fast enough for the second woman, they berate him and he leaves. He stops and dawdles by Issa's apartment building, but drives off instead of going up to her apartment.
| 13 | 5 | "Hella Shook" | Tina Mabry | Ben Dougan | August 20, 2017 | 1.322 |
Issa continues to be about her "hoe"tation and dates different men. She butts heads with Freida during their work retreat. Molly finds out her father cheated on her mother at her parents' vow renewal ceremony. Distraught, Molly has sex with Dro. Issa wrecks her car while looking at a 'dick pic' her neighbor sent to her cellphone. Daniel gives Issa a ride home after the accident. She asks if they are cool and on the same page with seeing other people. Lawrence finds out Issa is still hanging out with Daniel and blocks Issa on Facebook.
| 14 | 6 | "Hella Blows" | Kevin Bray | Regina Y. Hicks & Ben Corey Jones | August 27, 2017 | 1.331 |
Dro calls Molly and she ends the call when her mother calls but declines her mother's call as well. Issa goes to her neighbor Eddie's apartment unannounced to have sex but he is with another woman. Lawrence gets a rude awakening at work after pitching his app when the owners are overly polite but uninterested. His coworker tells him that his app is outdated and if the owners were interested they would have asked questions but they were afraid to offend Lawrence. Molly worries sex will ruin her friendship with Dro. Issa gets a $5,500 estimate to get her car repaired. Molly has sex with Dro again after telling him their last encounter was a one-time thing. She asks how their arrangement will work and if his wife knows. He tells her it was his wife's idea to see other people. Later, he leaves Molly in the hotel room when his wife texts him that she is locked out of the house. Issa tries to seduce Niko but he wants to get to know her better and she just wants sex. Tiffany teaches the ladies the power in giving blow jobs during the 'Sexplosion' event. Issa gives Daniel a blow job and he comes on her face. Irate, Issa storms out.
| 15 | 7 | "Hella Disrespectful" | Kevin Bray | Prentice Penny | September 3, 2017 | 0.788 |
Tensions run high when Issa and Lawrence are both invited to Derek's birthday party. Issa accepts Daniel's call and cuts him out of her life when he says they are even and now she knows how he felt. Molly rethinks her future and breaks things off with Dro after he brings his wife to the party. Issa realizes the vice principal is discriminating against the Latino students and makes amends with Frieda. Issa and Lawrence exchange heated words as Issa is waiting for her ride. Issa snaps and flips all her furniture over in her apartment.
| 16 | 8 | "Hella Perspective" | Melina Matsoukas | Issa Rae | September 10, 2017 | 0.806 |
Lawrence and his coworkers enter a marathon. Kelli also enters the marathon, with Issa, Molly, Tiffany, and Derek as her support. Tensions get high between Lawrence and Aparna when Lawrence notices how close she is to her ex, resulting in Aparna leaving. Molly interviews with other law firms after realizing her current firm does not value her as much as they should. She takes Quentin out when he comes to LA. As they get closer, they ultimately have sex. Issa's rent is increased. She is berated at work for not addressing the issue with Vice Principal Gaines. She decides to move out and live with her brother. She has a yard sale to get rid of her belongings. She invites Lawrence over to get the rest of his things and their couch while she is gone. She returns to the apartment to do the final walkthrough and to turn in her keys when she meets Lawrence, who waited for her to return, in the apartment. They exchange apologies, make amends, and express their continued love for each other, shedding tears while doing so. Lawrence leaves after saying goodbye to Issa. Molly invites Dro over for sex. Issa goes to Daniel's house to stay with him.

=== Season 3 (2018) ===
| No. overall | No. in season | Title | Directed by | Written by | Original release date | U.S. viewers (millions) |
|---|---|---|---|---|---|---|
| 17 | 1 | "Better-Like" | Prentice Penny | Issa Rae | August 12, 2018 | 0.699 |
| 18 | 2 | "Familiar-Like" | Pete Chatmon | Amy Aniobi | August 19, 2018 | 0.672 |
| 19 | 3 | "Backwards-Like" | Mo Marable | Ben Dougan | August 26, 2018 | 0.783 |
| 20 | 4 | "Fresh-Like" | Stella Meghie | Dayna Lynne North | September 2, 2018 (Note: "Fresh-Like" was released online on August 31, 2018, two days before its television air date.) | 0.474 |
| 21 | 5 | "High-Like" | Millicent Shelton | Regina Y. Hicks | September 9, 2018 | 0.563 |
The girls go to Coachella, which ends up highlighting their different life paths and priorities. Molly spends the whole time preoccupied with work. Issa brings Molly, Kelli, and Tiffany to a pool party with Nathan and his friends. Everyone ends up on drugs. Later on in the night, everyone heads to Coachella. Issa and Nathan splinter off and hook up on a Ferris wheel. The evening ends abruptly when Molly, Kelli, and Tiffany get kicked out after Kelli starts a fight with a bunch of hippies. Issa gets a call to head home and ends up yelling at everyone to sleep it off. The next day Issa offers to take Tiffany to get water and Tiffany expresses her feelings that everything has changed.
| 22 | 6 | "Ready-Like" | Liesl Tommy | Laura Kittrell | September 16, 2018 | 0.665 |
The girls all attend Tiffany's baby shower, but are surprised by Tiffany's other group of mother friends who have planned the baby shower. Issa reconnects with Lawrence and declares that she is finally over him. Kelli feels that she is losing a friend in Tiffany because Tiffany is so focused on having a baby and does not think that Kelli will be able to provide for her like her other "mom" friends can.
| 23 | 7 | "Obsessed-Like" | Kevin Bray | Prentice Penny | September 23, 2018 | 0.544 |
After Issa hasn't heard from Nathan after several days, she begins to obsess over why Nathan has not returned any of her communications. Molly goes on a date with Andrew, but feels tension when Andrew brings up her relationship with Dro. To understand why Nathan has ghosted her, Issa and Molly go to Nathan's home, under the pretense of Molly apologizing to Andrew, and Issa snoops in Nathan's bedroom. Lawrence begins to go to church.
| 24 | 8 | "Ghost-Like" | Regina King | Issa Rae & Natasha Rothwell | September 30, 2018 | 0.751 |
Molly is forced to come to some realisations about her behaviour after the consequences play out in both her personal and professional life. Issa continues working on her block party and Nathan gets in touch.

=== Season 4 (2020) ===
| No. overall | No. in season | Title | Directed by | Written by | Original release date | U.S. viewers (millions) |
|---|---|---|---|---|---|---|
| 25 | 1 | "Lowkey Feelin' Myself" | Kevin Bray | Issa Rae | April 12, 2020 | 0.586 |
| 26 | 2 | "Lowkey Distant" | Thembi Banks | Amy Aniobi | April 19, 2020 | 0.408 |
| 27 | 3 | "Lowkey Thankful" | Mark Sadlek | Phil Augusta Jackson | April 26, 2020 | 0.467 |
| 28 | 4 | "Lowkey Losin' It" | Nijla Mu'min | Laura Kittrell | May 3, 2020 | 0.378 |
| 29 | 5 | "Lowkey Movin' On" | Stella Meghie | Syreeta Singleton | May 10, 2020 | 0.388 |
| 30 | 6 | "Lowkey Done" | Lacey Duke | Fran Richter | May 17, 2020 | 0.427 |
| 31 | 7 | "Lowkey Trippin'" | Jay Ellis | Jason Lew | May 24, 2020 | 0.341 |
Molly and Andrew go on a short weekend vacation to Puerto Vallarta with Andrew's brother Victor and sister-in-law Lydia. Andrew and Molly grow closer, but a racial incident at the resort causes tension between Molly and Victor.
| 32 | 8 | "Lowkey Happy" | Ava Berkofsky | Natasha Rothwell | May 31, 2020 | 0.384 |
Issa and Lawrence reconnect over dinner and open up about their past relationship and discuss how they have changed since their relationship.
| 33 | 9 | "Lowkey Trying" | Kerry Washington | Grace Edwards & Eli Wilson Pelton | June 7, 2020 | 0.372 |
| 34 | 10 | "Lowkey Lost" | Prentice Penny | Prentice Penny | June 14, 2020 | 0.454 |
After attending a work party for Molly, Andrew starts to admit some of his grievances towards their relationship. The conversation is cut short by a call that Tiffany has gone missing. A search party is formed and they realize Tiffany has sequestered herself to a hotel in the city. Though Molly sees the longevity of their relationship as a sign of potential, Andrew doubts their compatibility and calls it quits. Lawrence reveals to Issa that Condola is pregnant with their child and keeping it. Molly reaches out to Issa and the two meet in a restaurant.

=== Season 5 (2021) ===
| No. overall | No. in season | Title | Directed by | Written by | Original release date | U.S. viewers (millions) |
|---|---|---|---|---|---|---|
| 35 | 1 | "Reunited, Okay?!" | Melina Matsoukas | Amy Aniobi | October 24, 2021 | 0.308 |
The season kicks off when the gang meet up at Stanford for their 10-year college reunion. Issa is invited to speak on a panel for entrepreneurs. Issa confronts her decisions following the block party and founding 'The BLOcc' her company. She reflects facing uncertainty and self-doubt. Tensions still linger between Molly and Issa but, this is quickly resolved when the pair are robbed at a liquor store after being set up by one of their former college mates. Returning to LA, Lawrence picks Issa from the airport and after an awkward drive home, Issa breaks up with Lawrence at her apartment.
| 36 | 2 | "Growth, Okay?!" | Mo Marable | Phil Augusta Jackson | October 31, 2021 | 0.193 |
One year has passed since the Stanford reunion. Issa and Molly are single and working on themselves. Issa's company works with a brand to showcase the designs of a local black designer, but is caught between the wants of the company and the desires of the artist. Issa puts on a fashion show. Molly addresses her flaws in her previous relationships and tries to start fresh in the dating scene.
| 37 | 3 | "Pressure, Okay?!" | Ava Berkofsky | Jason Lew | November 7, 2021 | 0.249 |
Condola gives birth and Lawrence grapples with his role as a new father while continuing his life in San Francisco.
| 38 | 4 | "Faulty, Okay?!" | Mo Marable | Syreeta Singleton | November 14, 2021 | 0.308 |
Issa, Molly and Kelli attend Nathan's beach party. Molly decides between two suitors at the beach. Issa deals with online backlash from the artist she promoted at the fashion show and works out the awkwardness between her and Nathan.
| 39 | 5 | "Surviving, Okay?!" | Kerry Washington | Laura Kittrell | November 21, 2021 | 0.248 |
Molly's mom has a stroke and ends up in a coma at the hospital. Molly deals with feeling like she needs to take on more responsibility in her mothers welfare as well as shifting priorities. Issa supports Molly by running errands that lead astray.
| 40 | 6 | "Tired, Okay?!" | Natasha Rothwell | Grace Edwards | November 28, 2021 | 0.278 |
Molly leaves on a work retreat and is distracted worrying about her mom's health. Issa's business is failing to gain traction in the community from her fallout with Crenshawn's fashion show. Nathan encounters workplace politics with a colleague at the barbershop.
| 41 | 7 | "Chillin', Okay?!" | Amy Aniobi | Fran Richter | December 5, 2021 | 0.204 |
Issa, Molly, Kelli and Tiff have a night in and play a game that leads to new revelations about themselves and each other.
| 42 | 8 | "Choices, Okay?!" | Kevin Bray | Eli Wilson Pelton | December 12, 2021 | 0.268 |
Issa has success with her artwalk event and comes to a crossroads about partnering with the brand NBW or with the local artist Crenshawn. She fantasizes about the outcome of her decisions and realizes she might have choices to make in her personal life. Molly works with Kelli to help her parents finalize their will.
| 43 | 9 | "Out, Okay?!" | Prentice Penny | Prentice Penny | December 19, 2021 | 0.256 |
Everyone reunites for Tiff's farewell party. Nathan and Lawrence get into an altercation at the party.
| 44 | 10 | "Everything Gonna Be, Okay?!" | Prentice Penny | Issa Rae | December 26, 2021 | 0.300 |
In the series finale, Nathan and Issa break up. The group celebrates their birthdays over the year and hit significant milestones. Molly's mother passes away, Kelli becomes pregnant and Issa gets back together with Lawrence. Molly gets married and Issa's professional and personal lives find success.

== Soundtracks ==
The soundtrack for the series is overseen by Rae, music supervisor Kier Lehmann and musician Raphael Saadiq. The soundtrack often uses modern alternative R&B artists. Compilations of songs used in the show have been released with each season. Several artists, such as Goldlink, Sampha, and The Internet (band) contributed to the soundtrack. The success of the soundtrack lead to Rae establishing her own record label, Raedio, in partnership with Atlantic Records and a publishing deal with Kobalt Music Group.

| Soundtrack | Release date | Label | Ref. |
|---|---|---|---|
| Season 1 | December 16, 2016 | RCA | |
| Season 2 | September 8, 2017 | RCA | |
| Season 3 | September 21, 2018 | RCA | |
| Season 4 | June 10, 2020 | Raedio; Atlantic | |
| Season 5 | December 3, 2021 | Raedio; Atlantic | |

== Reception ==
=== Critical response ===
Insecure premiered to widespread acclaim and continued to receive praise throughout its run for its humorous yet authentic and nuanced depiction of modern-day Black women and female friendships. Adam Howard of NBCNews.com noted that amid a broader resurgence of Black-centered television programming, the series stood out for its grounded and relatable portrayal of Black female experiences, offering a more ordinary and believable perspective compared to more heightened or exaggerated depictions. The Hollywood Reporter, The Guardian, and BBC Online consider the show to be among the greatest television series of the 21st century, ranking it at numbers 40, 49, and 83, respectively. Den of Geek named it the 21st "Best American TV Comedies of the 21st Century".

Critical response of Insecure
| Season | Rotten Tomatoes | Metacritic |
|---|---|---|
| 1 | 100% (65 reviews) | 84 (33 reviews) |
| 2 | 98% (41 reviews) | 90 (13 reviews) |
| 3 | 94% (27 reviews) | 84 (8 reviews) |
| 4 | 95% (20 reviews) | 80 (5 reviews) |
| 5 | 100% (25 reviews) | 80 (10 reviews) |

==== Season 1 ====
On Rotten Tomatoes, the season has a rating of 100% based on 65 reviews, with an average rating of 8.6/10. The site's critical consensus reads, "Insecure uses star Issa Rae's breakout web series Awkward Black Girl as the basis for an insightful, raunchy, and hilarious journey through the life of a twentysomething black woman that cuts through stereotypes with sharp wit and an effusive spirit." On Metacritic, the season has a score of 84 out of 100, based on 33 reviews, indicating "universal acclaim".

Eric Deggans of NPR wrote that "Rae has produced a series that feels revolutionary just by poking fun at the life of an average, twentysomething black woman." Greg Braxton of the Los Angeles Times wrote: "The half-hour series explores the friendship between two African American women who deal with their sometimes stormy relationship while also grappling with conflicts inside and outside black culture. Much of the humor has a raw flavor, and does not hold back on sexually frank situations and dialogue."

==== Season 2 ====
On Rotten Tomatoes, season two has an approval rating of 98% based on 41 reviews, with an average rating of 8.11/10. The site's critical consensus reads, "Insecure displays title-defying confidence in its second season, upping the comedy and deepening the relationships between its talented ensemble." On Metacritic, the season has a weighted average score of 90 out of 100, based on 13 critics, indicating "universal acclaim".

==== Season 3 ====
On Rotten Tomatoes, season three has an approval rating of 94% based on 27 reviews, with an average rating of 7.6/10. The site's critical consensus reads, "Insecure returns for a third season as authentic and exuberant as the star who made it, but with an added layer of growth that keeps it moving forward." On Metacritic, the season has a weighted average score of 84 out of 100, based on 8 critics, indicating "universal acclaim".

==== Season 4 ====
On Rotten Tomatoes, season four has an approval rating of 95% based on 20 reviews, with an average rating of 8.29/10. The site's critics consensus reads: "Insecure continues to be one of the funniest, warmest, and most beautifully-shot comedies that takes full advantage of its sunny L.A. setting." On Metacritic, the season has a weighted average score of 80 out of 100, based on five critics, indicating "generally favorable reviews".

==== Season 5 ====
On Rotten Tomatoes, season 5 has an approval rating of 100% based on 25 reviews, with an average rating of 9.3/10. The site's critical consensus states, "Issa's future remains uncertain, but Insecure enters its final season a fully confident comedy with plenty left to say about friendship, love, and self-esteem." On Metacritic, the season has a weighted average score of 80 out of 100, based on 10 critics, indicating "generally favorable reviews".

=== Accolades ===
| Year | Award | Category | Nominee(s) | Result | Ref. |
|---|---|---|---|---|---|
| 2017 | AAFCA Awards | AAFCA Top Ten TV Shows | Insecure | Won | |
| 2017 | Golden Globe Awards | Best Actress – Television Series Musical or Comedy | Issa Rae | Nominated | |
| 2017 | NAACP Image Awards | Outstanding Comedy Series | Insecure | Nominated | |
| 2017 | NAACP Image Awards | Outstanding Actress in a Comedy Series | Issa Rae | Nominated | |
| 2017 | NAACP Image Awards | Outstanding Supporting Actress in a Comedy Series | Yvonne Orji | Nominated | |
| 2017 | NAACP Image Awards | Outstanding Directing in a Comedy Series | Melina Matsoukas (for "Insecure as F**k") | Nominated | |
| 2017 | NAACP Image Awards | Outstanding Writing in a Comedy Series | Issa Rae and Larry Wilmore (for "Insecure as F**k") | Nominated | |
| 2017 | NAACP Image Awards | Outstanding Writing in a Comedy Series | Prentice Penny (for "Real as F**k") | Nominated | |
| 2017 | Dorian Awards | TV Comedy of the Year | Insecure | Nominated | |
| 2017 | NAMIC Vision Awards | Comedy | Insecure | Won | |
| 2017 | NAMIC Vision Awards | Best Performance – Comedy | Issa Rae | Won | |
| 2017 | MTV Movie & TV Awards | Show of the Year | Insecure | Nominated | |
| 2017 | MTV Movie & TV Awards | Next Generation | Issa Rae | Nominated | |
| 2017 | TCA Awards | Individual Achievement in Comedy | Issa Rae | Nominated | |
| 2017 | BET Awards | Best Actress | Issa Rae | Nominated | |
| 2017 | American Film Institute Awards | Top 10 TV Programs of the Year | Insecure | Won | |
| 2018 | Golden Globe Awards | Best Actress – Television Series Musical or Comedy | Issa Rae | Nominated | |
| 2018 | Peabody Awards | Entertainment honoree | Insecure | Won | |
| 2018 | Satellite Awards | Best Actress in a Musical or Comedy Series | Issa Rae | Nominated | |
| 2018 | NAACP Image Awards | Outstanding Comedy Series | Insecure | Nominated | |
| 2018 | NAACP Image Awards | Outstanding Actress in a Comedy Series | Issa Rae | Nominated | |
| 2018 | NAACP Image Awards | Outstanding Supporting Actor in a Comedy Series | Jay Ellis | Won | |
| 2018 | NAACP Image Awards | Outstanding Supporting Actress in a Comedy Series | Yvonne Orji | Nominated | |
| 2018 | NAACP Image Awards | Outstanding Writing in a Comedy Series | Issa Rae (for "Hella Great" and "Hella Perspective") | Nominated | |
| 2018 | Guild of Music Supervisors Awards | Best Music Supervision in a Television Comedy or Musical | Kier Lehman | Won | |
| 2018 | Guild of Music Supervisors Awards | Best Song/Recording Created for Television | "Quicksand" | Won | |
| 2018 | Primetime Emmy Awards | Outstanding Lead Actress in a Comedy Series | Issa Rae (for "Hella Great") | Nominated | |
| 2018 | Primetime Creative Arts Emmy Awards | Outstanding Cinematography for a Single-Camera Series (Half-Hour) | Patrick Cady (for "Hella LA") | Nominated | |
| 2019 | Satellite Awards | Best Musical or Comedy Series | Insecure | Nominated | |
| 2019 | Satellite Awards | Best Actress in a Musical or Comedy Series | Issa Rae | Won | |
| 2019 | Critics' Choice Television Awards | Best Actress in a Comedy Series | Issa Rae | Nominated | |
| 2019 | Primetime Creative Arts Emmy Awards | Outstanding Cinematography for a Single-Camera Series (Half-Hour) | Ava Berkofsky (for "High-Like") | Nominated | |
| 2020 | Black Reel Awards | Outstanding Comedy Series | Insecure | Won | |
| 2020 | Black Reel Awards | Outstanding Actress, Comedy Series | Issa Rae | Won | |
| 2020 | Black Reel Awards | Outstanding Supporting Actor, Comedy Series | Jay Ellis | Nominated | |
| 2020 | Black Reel Awards | Outstanding Supporting Actress, Comedy Series | Yvonne Orji | Won | |
| 2020 | Black Reel Awards | Outstanding Supporting Actress, Comedy Series | Natasha Rothwell | Nominated | |
| 2020 | Black Reel Awards | Outstanding Guest Actor, Comedy Series | Neil Brown Jr. | Nominated | |
| 2020 | Black Reel Awards | Outstanding Directing, Comedy Series | Stella Meghie (for "Lowkey Movin On") | Nominated | |
| 2020 | Black Reel Awards | Outstanding Writing, Comedy Series | Natasha Rothwell (for "Lowkey Happy") | Nominated | |
| 2020 | Black Reel Awards | Outstanding Writing, Comedy Series | Syreeta Singleton (for "Lowkey Movin' On") | Nominated | |
| 2020 | TCA Awards | Outstanding Achievement in Comedy | Insecure | Nominated | |
| 2020 | TCA Awards | Individual Achievement in Comedy | Issa Rae | Nominated | |
| 2020 | Primetime Emmy Awards | Outstanding Comedy Series | Insecure | Nominated | |
| 2020 | Primetime Emmy Awards | Outstanding Lead Actress in a Comedy Series | Issa Rae (for "Lowkey Happy") | Nominated | |
| 2020 | Primetime Emmy Awards | Outstanding Supporting Actress in a Comedy Series | Yvonne Orji (for "Lowkey Lost") | Nominated | |
| 2020 | Primetime Creative Arts Emmy Awards | Outstanding Casting for a Comedy Series | Victoria Thomas and Matthew Maisto | Nominated | |
| 2020 | Primetime Creative Arts Emmy Awards | Outstanding Cinematography for a Single-Camera Series (Half-Hour) | Kira Kelly (for "Lowkey Happy") | Nominated | |
| 2020 | Primetime Creative Arts Emmy Awards | Outstanding Cinematography for a Single-Camera Series (Half-Hour) | Ava Berkofsky (for "Lowkey Lost") | Nominated | |
| 2020 | Primetime Creative Arts Emmy Awards | Outstanding Music Supervision | Kier Lehman (for "Lowkey Movin' On) | Nominated | |
| 2020 | Primetime Creative Arts Emmy Awards | Outstanding Single-Camera Picture Editing for a Comedy Series | Nena Erb and Lynarion Hubbard (for "Lowkey Trying") | Won | |
| 2020 | Gold Derby Awards | Best Comedy Series | Insecure | Nominated | |
| 2020 | Gold Derby Awards | Best Actress in a Comedy Series | Issa Rae | Nominated | |
| 2021 | American Cinema Editors Awards | Best Edited Comedy Series for Non-Commercial Television | Nena Erb (for "Lowkey Trying") | Nominated | |
| 2021 | American Society of Cinematographers Awards | Outstanding Achievement in Cinematography in an Episode of a Half-Hour Television Series | Ava Berkofsky (for "Lowkey Trying") | Nominated | |
| 2021 | BET Awards | Best Actress | Issa Rae | Nominated | |
| 2021 | Critics' Choice Television Awards | Best Actress in a Comedy Series | Issa Rae | Nominated | |
| 2021 | MTV Movie & TV Awards | Best Comedic Performance | Issa Rae | Nominated | |
| 2021 | NAACP Image Awards | Outstanding Comedy Series | Insecure | Won | |
| 2021 | NAACP Image Awards | Outstanding Actress in a Comedy Series | Issa Rae | Won | |
| 2021 | NAACP Image Awards | Outstanding Supporting Actor in a Comedy Series | Jay Ellis | Nominated | |
| 2021 | NAACP Image Awards | Outstanding Supporting Actress in a Comedy Series | Natasha Rothwell | Nominated | |
| 2021 | NAACP Image Awards | Outstanding Supporting Actress in a Comedy Series | Yvonne Orji | Nominated | |
| 2021 | NAACP Image Awards | Outstanding Soundtrack/Compilation Album | Insecure: Music from the HBO Original Series | Nominated | |
| 2021 | NAACP Image Awards | Outstanding Writing in a Comedy Series | Issa Rae (for "Lowkey Feelin' Myself") | Nominated | |
| 2021 | Satellite Awards | Best Television Series – Musical or Comedy | Insecure | Nominated | |
| 2021 | Satellite Awards | Best Actress in a Musical or Comedy Series | Issa Rae | Nominated | |
| 2022 | Black Reel Television Awards | Outstanding Comedy Series | Insecure | Nominated | |
| 2022 | Black Reel Television Awards | Outstanding Actress, Comedy Series | Issa Rae | Nominated | |
| 2022 | Black Reel Television Awards | Outstanding Supporting Actor, Comedy Series | Jay Ellis | Nominated | |
| 2022 | Black Reel Television Awards | Outstanding Supporting Actress, Comedy Series | Natasha Rothwell | Nominated | |
| 2022 | Black Reel Television Awards | Outstanding Supporting Actress, Comedy Series | Yvonne Orji | Nominated | |
| 2022 | Black Reel Television Awards | Outstanding Guest Actor, Comedy Series | Kofi Siriboe | Nominated | |
| 2022 | Black Reel Television Awards | Outstanding Writing, Comedy Series | Prentice Penny (for "Out, Okay?") | Nominated | |
| 2022 | Black Reel Television Awards | Outstanding Original Song | "Get It Girl" by Fresh Kid Ice, Luther Campbell, Lil Jon, Mr. Mixx and Liana Banks | Nominated | |
| 2022 | Black Reel Television Awards | Outstanding Music Supervision | Kier Lehman | Won | |
| 2022 | Black Reel Television Awards | Outstanding Musical Score | Raphael Saadiq | Won | |
| 2022 | Critics' Choice Television Awards | Best Comedy Series | Insecure | Nominated | |
| 2022 | Critics' Choice Television Awards | Best Actress in a Comedy Series | Issa Rae | Nominated | |
| 2022 | Golden Globe Awards | Best Actress – Television Series Musical or Comedy | Issa Rae | Nominated | |
| 2022 | Hollywood Critics Association TV Awards | Best Actress in a Broadcast Network or Cable Series, Comedy | Issa Rae | Nominated | |
| 2022 | Hollywood Critics Association TV Awards | Best Writing in a Broadcast Network or Cable Series, Comedy | Issa Rae (for "Everything's Gonna Be, Okay?!") | Nominated | |
| 2022 | NAACP Image Awards | Outstanding Comedy Series | Insecure | Won | |
| 2022 | NAACP Image Awards | Outstanding Actor in a Comedy Series | Jay Ellis | Nominated | |
| 2022 | NAACP Image Awards | Outstanding Actress in a Comedy Series | Issa Rae | Won | |
| 2022 | NAACP Image Awards | Outstanding Actress in a Comedy Series | Yvonne Orji | Nominated | |
| 2022 | NAACP Image Awards | Outstanding Supporting Actor in a Comedy Series | Kendrick Sampson | Nominated | |
| 2022 | NAACP Image Awards | Outstanding Supporting Actress in a Comedy Series | Amanda Seales | Nominated | |
| 2022 | NAACP Image Awards | Outstanding Supporting Actress in a Comedy Series | Natasha Rothwell | Won | |
| 2022 | NAACP Image Awards | Outstanding Guest Actor or Actress in a Television Series | Christina Elmore | Nominated | |
| 2022 | NAACP Image Awards | Outstanding Directing in a Comedy Series | Melina Matsoukas (for "Reunited, Okay?!") | Nominated | |
| 2022 | NAACP Image Awards | Outstanding Directing in a Comedy Series | Prentice Penny (for "Everything's Gonna Be, Okay?!") | Nominated | |
| 2022 | NAACP Image Awards | Outstanding Writing in a Comedy Series | Issa Rae (for "Everything's Gonna Be, Okay?!") | Won | |
| 2022 | Primetime Emmy Awards | Outstanding Lead Actress in a Comedy Series | Issa Rae | Nominated | |
| 2022 | Primetime Creative Arts Emmy Awards | Outstanding Cinematography for a Single-Camera Series (Half-Hour) | Ava Berkofsky (for "Reunited, Okay?!") | Nominated | |
| 2022 | Primetime Creative Arts Emmy Awards | Outstanding Single-Camera Picture Editing for a Comedy Series | Nena Erb (for "Choices, Okay?!") | Nominated | |
| 2022 | Set Decorators Society of America Awards | Best Achievement in Décor/Design of a Half-Hour Single-Camera Series | Amber Haley and Kay Lee | Nominated | |

== Syndication ==
The series began airing on Oprah Winfrey Network on February 7, 2023, with two back-to-back episodes. In July 2023, the series was added to Netflix in the U.S., making it the first HBO series to be available on Netflix.
