= Awkward Black Girl =

Web series by Issa Rae

- Also known as: The Mis-Adventures of Awkward Black Girl
- Genre: Comedy
- Created by: Issa Rae
- Creative director: Mimi Valdés
- Starring: Issa Rae; Sujata Day; Tracy Oliver; Hanna; Madison T. Shockley III; Andrew Allan James; Harris; Fahad; Tristen Winger; Leah A. Williams; Lyman Johnson
- Country of origin: United States
- Original language: English
- No. of seasons: 2
- No. of episodes: 25

Production
- Executive producers: Pharrell Williams; Robin Frank
- Producers: Issa Rae; Tracy Oliver

Original release
- Network: YouTube
- Release: February 3, 2011 – February 28, 2013

Related
- Insecure

The Mis-Adventures of Awkward Black Girl (often simply referred to as Awkward Black Girl) is an American comedy web series created by and starring Issa Rae. It premiered on a dedicated YouTube channel on February 3, 2011. The show follows the life of J as she interacts with co-workers and love interests who place her in uncomfortable situations. The story is told through first-person narrative as J usually reveals how she feels about her circumstances through voice-over or dream sequence.

Critics have praised Awkward Black Girl for its witty humor and unique, realistic portrayal of African-American women. The New York Times critic Jon Caramica describes the show as “full of sharp, pointillist humor that’s extremely refreshing.” The series won a Shorty Award for Best Web Series in 2012.

In 2016, the series was adapted into the HBO series Insecure, which ended in 2021.

== History ==
Issa Rae was inspired to create The Mis-Adventures of Awkward Black Girl in January 2009 while working at New Federal Theatre in New York City. Experiencing difficulty in meeting people in an unfamiliar place, Issa Rae decided that it would be entertaining to depict uncomfortable scenarios one may experience when dealing with others. Neglecting the idea for two years, Issa Rae's interest was renewed after reading an article by Leslie Pitterson pointing out the absence of black female nerd characters on screen. She then called on friends to shoot the first episode. The series went viral through word of mouth, blog posts, and social media, which resulted in further media coverage. In an effort to fund the rest of the season, Issa Rae and producer Tracy Oliver decided to raise money for the series through Kickstarter. On August 11, 2011, they were awarded $56,269 from 1,960 donations. Due to the popularity of the series, Issa Rae has been interviewed by Fredricka Whitfield for CNN Newsroom, Michel Martin for Tell Me More, Associated Press and other media outlets.

The second season of Awkward Black Girl aired on Pharrell Williams's i am OTHER in 2012-2013.

== Characters and cast ==
- J is the self-described "awkward and black" passive-aggressive main character who works at a call center for weight-loss pill company, Gutbusters. Throughout the series J has to deal with rival, co-worker Nina, and being in love with two men, White J and Fred. As a means of dealing with the stresses of her love-life and work environment, J composes and performs rap lyrics sometimes with friend, CeCe. J is portrayed by Issa Rae, creator, actress, writer, and director.
- CeCe is the best friend/sidekick and co-worker of J who works in human resources. Typically excited, CeCe offers J fallible advice that usually leads J into trouble. CeCe is portrayed by actress and writer Sujata Day.
- Nina is the primary antagonist and co-worker of J. She makes it her duty to stir up trouble for J and mock her. She is promoted by Boss Lady over J and appears to have dated J's love interest, Fred. Nina is portrayed by actress, writer, and producer Tracy Oliver.
- Boss Lady is J's superior and an antagonist of J. She is apparently unaware of her racial insensitivity. Boss Lady is portrayed by actress and writer, Hanna.
- Fred is J's initial love interest and co-worker. Fred is portrayed by actor Madison T. Shockley III.
- A is an antagonist and nerdy co-worker of J. He is introduced in the series as her "awkward mistake" after she slept with him at a company holiday party. A is portrayed by actor and dancer Andrew Allan James.
- Patty is an antagonist of J and other Gutbusters employees. She is commonly referred to as Germy Patty because she is always sick and perpetually carrying tissues. Patty continues to appear at the Gutbusters office and company social events, even after being fired by Boss Lady. Patty is portrayed by actress Kiki Harris.
- Amir is an antagonist of J and other Gutbusters employees. He makes racially insensitive jokes at the expense of his co-workers. Amir is portrayed by actor and producer, Fahad.
- Darius is an antagonist and co-worker of J. He is commonly referred to as "Baby Voice Darius". Darius speaks low enough that others find him inaudible except for long-time friend, Fred. He has a very loud laugh that is rarely heard. Darius is portrayed by actor Tristen Winger.
- Dolores Clarence is a co-worker and antagonist of J and CeCe. She works in human resources and changes her name to Sister Mary after becoming a born-again Christian. Dolores is portrayed by actress Leah A. Williams
- Jesus is J's superior and an antagonist of J. The former sensitivity trainer, he replaces Boss Lady as manager after she is called to corporate. He is portrayed by actor Michael Ruesga.
- White Jay is a love interest of J who works as an anger management counselor. He is outwardly off-beat and appears to share the same awkward disposition as J. His introduction creates a love triangle between him, J and Fred, however she chooses him in the end. White Jay is portrayed by actor Lyman Johnson.
- Jerry is an overly excited temporary worker at Gutbusters. He is portrayed by actor Ricky Woznichak.
- D is J's former boyfriend. D is played by actor Mike Danger.

== Episodes ==
Season	Episodes	Originally released	
Season	Episodes	First released	Last released
1	12	February 3, 2011	January 13, 2012
2	12	June 4, 2012	February 28, 2013

=== Season 1 (2011–12) ===
No. overall	No. in season	Title	Directed by	Written by	Original release date
1	1	"The Stop Sign"	N/A	N/A	February 3, 2011
When J keeps getting caught at a stop-sign, she keeps getting spotted by her accidental one-nighter, A, who constantly annoys J as she tries to ignore him.
2	2	"The Job"	N/A	N/A	March 3, 2011
When Nina gets the promotion that J has been waiting to get from Boss Lady, J tries to keep her angry mood at ease, although she has a passive-aggressive attitude.
3	3	"The Hallway"	N/A	N/A	April 7, 2011
Every time J passes through the hallway, she bumps into CeCe, who is seemed to also have an awkward stage which makes both J and CeCe become best friends.
4	4	"The Icebreaker"	N/A	N/A	May 5, 2011
J and CeCe's common friendship rises to a better climax, although Nina has found her ally in Amir, who makes insensitive racial jokes about his co-workers.
5	5	"The Dance"	N/A	Issa Rae; O.C. Smith	June 2, 2011
After Fred invites J to his party, she finds that she is not the only one that was invited. She then tries to come closer to Fred, but Nina interferes in the process of their relationship. She then gets upset, but she spots White Jay in the kitchen, where Fred comes in and makes jealous looks at the two of them. At the end, everyone does a slow dance, where Fred and Nina kiss, which makes J even more aggravated.
6	6	"The Stapler"	N/A	Amy Aniobi; O.C. Smith	July 8, 2011
J is still caught up in the Fred and Nina make-out at the party and she is unable to handle her anger. All of her co-workers constantly takes her stapler, where at one point it goes missing and then J shouts in the office. She gets sent to an anger management session, which is being taught by White Jay. In the end, J and White Jay make plans for a date.
7	7	"The Date"	Dennis Dortch	Issa Rae; Tracy Oliver	August 3, 2011
J embarks on her first "White Date" with Jay.
8	8	"The Project"	N/A	Issa Rae; Tracy Oliver	September 7, 2011
As J deals with the awkwardness of talking to Fred, CeCe is faced with an overly religious co-worker.
9	9	"The Happy Hour"	Issa Rae; Shea Vanderpoort	Amy J. Aniobi; O.C. Smith	October 5, 2011
J has to deal with the awkwardness of group dinners when Boss Lady rewards her Gutbuster employees by taking them out to dinner.
10–11	10a 10b	"The Unexpected"	Issa Rae; Shea Vanderpoort	Issa Rae; Tracy Oliver	October 31, 2011 (Part 1); November 7, 2011 (Part 2)
When Nina takes over the office, J and the Gutbuster employees are subject to her wrath.
12	11	"The Exes"	Issa Rae; Shea Vanderpoort	Amy J. Aniobi; O.C. Smith	December 1, 2011
After being dissed by White Jay, CeCe causes J to reflect on her dating history.
13	12	"The Decision"	Shea Vanderpoort	Amy J. Aniobi; Tracy Oliver; Issa Rae; O.C. Smith	January 13, 2012
When Fred and White Jay make an unexpected visit to J's place, she is forced to make a decision.

=== Season 2 (2012–13) ===
No. overall	No. in season	Title	Directed by	Written by	Original release date
14	1	"The Sleepover"	Shea William Vanderpoort	Amy Aniobi; O.C. Smith	June 14, 2012
J and White Jay attempt to get more intimate as J deals with the insecurity of her ex hook-ups becoming friends.
15	2	"The Visit"	Shea William Vanderpoort	Issa Rae; Tracy Oliver	July 12, 2012
J turns to girl talk for input on when is the right time to take her relationship with White Jay to the next step.
16	3	"The Jingle"	Shea William Vanderpoort	Issa Rae; Tracy Oliver	August 9, 2012
Just when things were looking up, J's mother's unsolicited judgment leaves J questioning the direction in which her life is heading.
17	4	"The Search"	Shea William Vanderpoort	Issa Rae; Tracy Oliver	September 13, 2012
J finally decides to search for a new job, but just when things are looking up, White Jay throws a curveball.
18	5	"The Interview"	Shea William Vanderpoort	Oreathia Smith	October 11, 2012
As J undergoes the excruciating interview process, she runs into someone unexpected.
19	6	"The Waiter"	Shea William Vanderpoort	Issa Rae	November 15, 2012
J prepares to get intimate with White Jay, but White Jay takes J out to dinner with a waiter (Timothy DeLaGhetto) who constantly insults White Jay, but White Jay starts to defend him and J. Guest Stars: Timothy DeLaGhetto as The Waiter Notes: At the end of the episode, it was announced that the show will start to premiere two episodes per month starting in December 2012. Also, the episode was scheduled to premiere on November 8, 2012, but was rescheduled to November 15, 2012.
20	7	"The Group"	Shea William Vanderpoort	Amy Aniobi; Chase Jackson; OC Smith	December 13, 2012
In order to make it out by 5 for an important call, J tries to take lead of a group project.
21	8	"The Friends"	Shea William Vanderpoort	Chas Jackson; Issa Rae	December 27, 2012
After an embarrassing first impression, J tries her best to get to know White Jay's friends at their annual holiday get-together.
22	9	"The Check"	Shea William Vanderpoort	Amy Aniobi	January 10, 2013
Things take a turn for the worse when White Jay takes J to an awkward group dinner with his friends.
23	10	"The Call"	Shea William Vanderpoort	O.C. Smith	January 24, 2013
After a huge fight, J seeks the help of CeCe and her new beau.
24–25	11a 11b	"The Apology (Part One); The Change (Part Two)"	Shea William Vanderpoort	Amy Aniobi; Chas Jackson; O.C. Smith	February 14, 2013 (Part One); February 28, 2013 (Part Two)
J juggles her final job interview, her failing relationship with White Jay, and there's a new twist at Gutbusters.

== Reception ==
In 2012, Rae was featured in the esteemed Forbes 30 Under 30 Entertainment List for her work with Awkward Black Girl. The show also won the Shorty Award for Best Web Series.

Critics have praised Awkward Black Girl for its witty humor and unique, realistic portrayal of African-American women. The New York Times critic Jon Caramica describes the show as “full of sharp, pointillist humor that’s extremely refreshing.” On her site beyondblackwhite.com, Christelyn Karazin wrote, “Aren't you tired of seeing black women look like idiots on television? Here's a girl—whom I suspect is a lot like the women who read this blog—quirky, funny, a little unsure of herself, rocks her hair natural and is beautifully brown skinned.”

Erin Stegeman of The Tangled Web praises Awkward Black Girl for defying stereotypes of African American women and being “an uber-relatable slice of life, narrated by J’s inner-ramblings that run through any awkward person’s mind.”

== See also ==
- Insecure (TV series)
