= Moonface (podcast) =

Fiction podcast starring Joel Kim Booster

Publication
- No. of episodes: 6
- Original release: October 9, 2019 – 2019

Moonface is a fiction podcast produced by James Kim and starring Joel Kim Booster and Esther Moon. The podcast contained six episodes that were released in 2019.

== Background ==
The podcast debuted on October 9, 2019. The show contains sexually explicit scenes. The series contains six episodes. The podcast draws inspiration from Igby Goes Down, Ghost World, and The Sisterhood of the Traveling Pants. The podcast was independently produced by James Kim. The protagonist, Paul, is played by Joel Kim Booster and his mother is played by Esther Moon. The story is set in Downey, California. The story follows a first-generation Korean immigrant named Paul, who is struggling to come out to his mother as gay due to a language barrier. Paul works a job as a waiter.

== Reception ==
Zoella called the podcast "Raw, thought-provoking and poignant". Emma Dibdin wrote in The New York Times that the show is a "touching, elegantly soundtracked" podcast. Ammar Kalia wrote in The Guardian that the podcast is "emotively nuanced" and "quietly thought-provoking." Nicholas Quah wrote in Vulture that the podcast was "executed with tremendous flair". Elena Fernández Collins wrote in The A.V. Club that the podcast uses "raw, tender sound design." Ashlea Halpern wrote in the Condé Nast Traveler that the podcast "will move you to tears." Jack Conway wrote in the LA Review of Books channel Podcast Review that the show "brims with joy and pain".

== See also ==
- List of LGBT podcasts
