= Issa Rae =

American actress and writer (born 1985)

- Issa Rae at the Toronto International Film Festival world premiere of Babies in 2026
- Born: Jo-Issa Rae Diop; January 12, 1985 (age 41); Los Angeles, California, U.S.
- Education: Stanford University (BA)
- Occupations: Actress; writer; producer
- Years active: 2011–present
- Spouse: Louis Diame (m. 2021)
- Website: issarae.com

Jo-Issa Rae Diop (born January 12, 1985), known professionally as Issa Rae, is an American actress, writer, and producer. She achieved recognition as the co-creator, co-writer, and star of the HBO comedy series Insecure (2016–2021), for which she was nominated for multiple Golden Globes Awards and Primetime Emmy Awards.

Rae first garnered attention for her work on the YouTube web series Awkward Black Girl (2011–2013). Her 2015 memoir, titled The Misadventures of Awkward Black Girl, became a New York Times bestseller. Rae formed the production company Hoorae Media in 2020.

Rae has also featured in films, with roles in the drama The Hate U Give (2018); the fantasy comedy Little (2019); the romance The Photograph (2020); the romantic comedy The Lovebirds (2020); the comedy thriller Vengeance (2022); and the comedies Barbie and American Fiction (both 2023). She also had a voice role in the short film Hair Love (2019) and voiced Jess Drew / Spider-Woman in Spider-Man: Across the Spider-Verse (2023).

In 2018 and 2022, Rae was included in the annual Time 100 list of the most influential people in the world, and in 2014 in the Forbes '30 Under 30' list in the entertainment section. She was recognized with the Peabody Trailblazer Award and the Producers Guild of America Visionary Award.

== Early life ==
Jo-Issa Rae Diop was born in Los Angeles, California. Her father, Abdoulaye Diop, is a pediatrician and neonatologist from Senegal, and her mother, Delyna Marie Diop (née Hayward), is a teacher from Louisiana. Her parents met in France, when they were both in school. She has four siblings. Her father has a medical practice in Inglewood, California.

The family lived in Dakar, Senegal, during some of her childhood. She was raised mostly in Potomac, Maryland, where she grew up with "things that aren't considered 'black,' like the swim team and street hockey and Passover dinners with Jewish best friends." Rae was raised Catholic, her mother's faith.

When Rae was in sixth grade, her family moved to the affluent View Park-Windsor Hills neighborhood of Los Angeles, where she attended a predominantly black middle school. Rae graduated from King Drew Magnet High School of Medicine and Science, where she started acting. Her parents divorced when she was in high school. Rae is fluent in French.

In 2007, Rae graduated from Stanford University with a Bachelor of Arts in African and African-American Studies. As a college student, she made music videos, wrote and directed plays, and created a mock reality series called Dorm Diaries for fun. At Stanford, Rae met Tracy Oliver, who helped produce Awkward Black Girl and starred on the show as Nina.

After college, Rae received a theater fellowship at The Public Theater in New York City. Oliver and Rae started taking classes together at the New York Film Academy. Rae worked odd jobs and at one point was struggling to decide between business school and law school, but abandoned both prospects when Awkward Black Girl gained wider popularity in 2011.

== Career ==
=== Awkward Black Girl ===
Rae's web series Awkward Black Girl premiered on YouTube in 2011. The show follows the life of J (played by Rae) as she interacts with co-workers and love interests who place her in uncomfortable situations. The story is told through a first-person narrative as J usually reveals how she feels about her circumstances through voice-over or dream sequence.

The series went viral through word of mouth, blog posts, and social media, resulting in mainstream media coverage and attention. In an effort to fund the rest of the first season, Rae and producer Tracy Oliver decided to raise money for the series through Kickstarter. On August 11, 2011, they were awarded $56,269 from 1,960 donations and released the rest of season one on Rae's YouTube channel.

Rae partnered with Pharrell and premiered season two of the series on his YouTube channel iamOTHER. Rae began releasing other content on her original channel, predominantly created by and starring people of color.

In 2013, Awkward Black Girl won a Shorty award for Best Web Show. Rae created Awkward Black Girl because she felt the Hollywood stereotypes of African-American women were limiting and she could not relate to them:

I've always had an issue with the [assumption] that people of color, and black people especially, aren't relatable. I know we are.

By using YouTube as her forum, Rae was able to have autonomy of her work because she writes, films, produces, and edits most of her work. Rae's other shows—Ratchet Piece Theater, The "F" Word, Roomieloverfriends, and The Choir, among others—also focus on African-American experiences that are often not portrayed in the mainstream media. Rae's YouTube series often imitate the production style of network television comedies, including "cut-away scenes" showing imagined behavior, similar to those seen in Scrubs and How I Met Your Mother.

=== Insecure ===
In 2013, Rae began working on a comedy series pilot with Larry Wilmore, in which she would star. The series, about the awkward experiences of a contemporary African-American woman, was eventually titled Insecure. HBO picked up the pilot in early 2015 and it was subsequently greenlit. Since its release in 2016, the series has received critical acclaim; Eric Deggans of NPR wrote that "Rae has produced a series that feels revolutionary just by poking fun at the life of an average, twenty-something black woman."

In late 2016 Rae's mother, Delyna Diop, was featured in season 1, playing Rae's role model in her guest appearance.

In 2017, the American Film Institute selected Insecure as one of the top 10 Television Programs of the Year. For her acting work on the show, Rae has received two Golden Globe Award nominations for Best Actress – Television Series Musical or Comedy in 2017 and 2018, as well as three Primetime Emmy Award nominations for Outstanding Lead Actress in a Comedy Series in 2018, 2020, and 2022.

In 2018, at the 77th annual Peabody Awards, Insecure was honored for "creating a series that authentically captures the lives of everyday young, black people in modern society."

On November 14, 2016, HBO renewed the show for a second season. The second season premiered on July 23, 2017. On August 8, 2017, it was announced that the show was renewed for a third season, which premiered on August 12, 2018. Season five premiered October 24, 2021. The final episode of Insecure aired December 26, 2021.

=== Film work ===
Released in 2020, The Photograph follows the journey of Issa's character, Mae Morton, and LaKeith Stanfield's character Michael Block, as the two search for the backstory of Mae's mother. The New York Times said the film is "an unabashedly old-school love story". Empire magazine said that "The Photograph is an African-American romance that, for the most part, feels relatable and true".

Released in 2020, The Lovebirds directed by Michael Showalter, Rae played the role of Leilani. The film also starred Kumail Nanjiani, who played Jibran, Leilani's boyfriend. Throughout the film, the couple struggles to maintain their relationship and during this, they face an eventful murder.

=== Book ===
Rae's first book, a memoir titled The Misadventures of Awkward Black Girl, was released in 2015 and became a New York Times bestseller. In the book, she chronicles her life through a series of humorous anecdotes and opens up about her personal struggle with not fitting in, and not being considered "black enough" at times.

=== Other work ===
In 2016, Rae created the podcast called Fruit.

On October 11, 2019, Google announced that Rae would be an additional voice to the Google Assistant. Users could make Google Assistant speak in Rae's voice by saying "Ok Google, talk like Issa." Issa's voice was available until Friday, October 1, 2021.

Also in 2019, Rae, through her newly launched record label Raedio, partnered with Atlantic Records to produce "Kinda Love" by singer-rapper TeaMarrr.

In March 2021, Rae's production company, Hoorae, signed a five-year film and television deal with WarnerMedia. In 2021, Sweet Life: Los Angeles, a reality television program created by Rae, was produced as part of this deal.

Rae is a co-owner of Hilltop Coffee + Kitchen, a Los Angeles-based independent coffee chain.

== Personal life ==
Rae's birth name, Jo-Issa, comes from a combination of the names of her grandmothers: Joyce and Isseu. Her middle name, Rae, is after an aunt, who was an artist.

Rae married her longtime boyfriend, Louis Diame, a Senegalese businessman, in a private ceremony in France in July 2021. Rae first wore her engagement ring publicly on the cover of Essence magazine's April 2019 issue.

She is part of an investor group that bought the SailGP U.S. squad in 2023.

== Public image and activism ==
In 2012, Rae was included on the annual Forbes '30 Under 30' list in the entertainment section. She was listed two times in the annual Time 100 list of the most influential people in the world.

In May 2015, Rae appeared on the cover of Essence magazine's Game Changers issue, alongside Shonda Rhimes, Ava DuVernay, Debbie Allen, and Mara Brock Akil. Rae expressed her desire for more people of color working in production behind the scenes to make a lasting impact in the television industry. On the red carpet at the 2017 Emmy Awards, Rae told reporters, "I'm rooting for everybody Black." The quote went viral and appeared on T-shirts and in the song "Sue Me" by the rapper Wale. Rae was also vocally supportive of the 2023 Writers Guild of America strike.

Rae is an advocate for civil rights and women's rights movements. Her work includes themes of equality and social justice. She works closely with organizations like the ACLU, BLD PWR, and Black Lives Matter. Rae has used her platform to bring attention to police violence and brutality against African-Americans. Following the police shooting of Alton Sterling in 2016, she raised $700,000 for the Sterling Family Trust to help pay for the Sterling children to attend college. Also in 2020, Rae told The Hollywood Reporter about how she and her staff wanted to support initiatives within organizations like Black Lives Matter and BLD PWR in order to hold the police accountable and to defund the police following the perceived rise of police brutality. Rae also spoke of supporting these initiatives in hopes to also aid protesters working against the violence and brutality.

Her show Insecure has changed the public perception of the South Los Angeles community by highlighting Black businesses.

== Filmography ==
=== Film ===
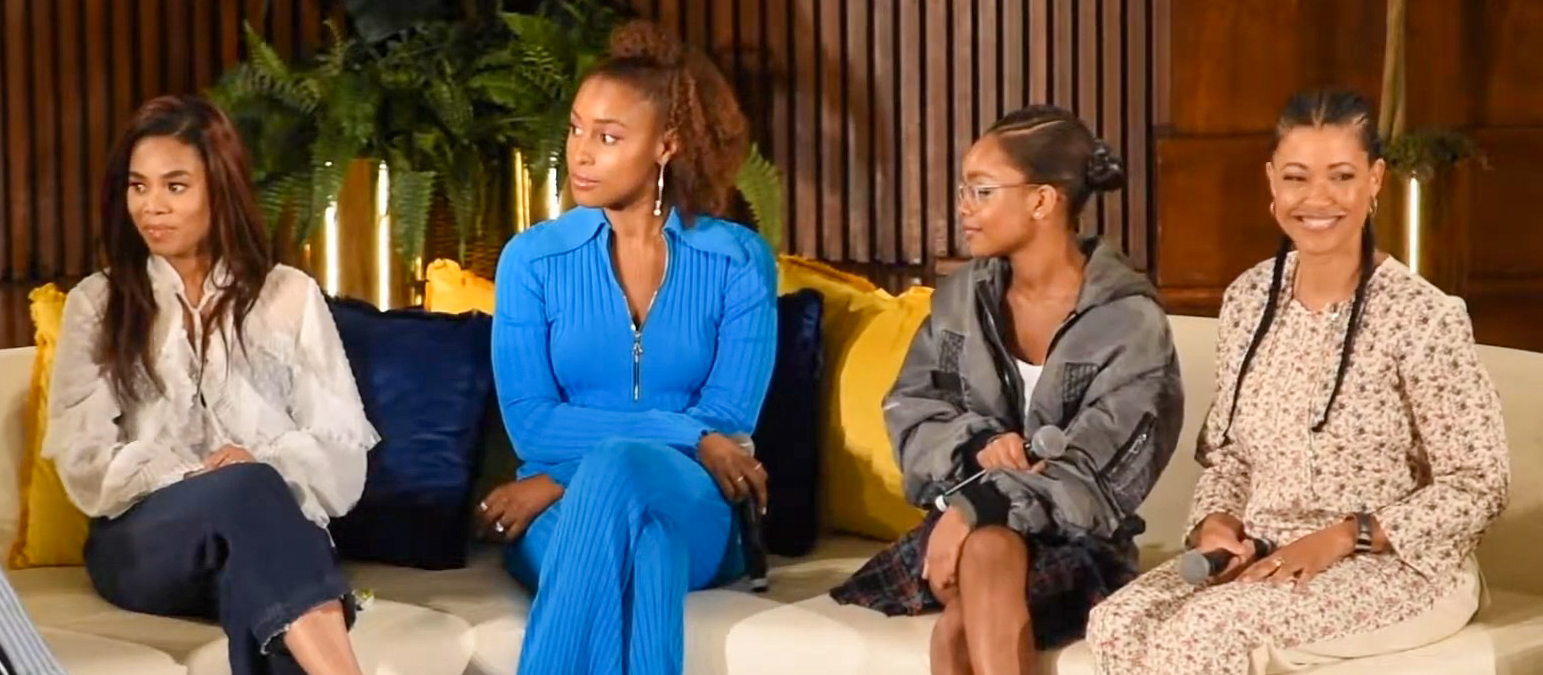
Rae (second from left) discusses Little with co-stars Regina Hall and Marsai Martin and director Tina Gordon

| Year | Title | Role | Notes |
|---|---|---|---|
| 2014 | Black Twitter Screening | —N/a | Short film; writer only |
| 2014 | Protect and Serve | Police Recruit | Short film; also executive producer |
| 2014 | A Bitter Lime | Jane Johnson | |
| 2018 | The Hate U Give | April Ofrah | |
| 2019 | Little | April Williams | |
| 2019 | Hair Love | Mother | Short film; voice role |
| 2020 | The Photograph | Mae Morton | Also executive producer |
| 2020 | The Lovebirds | Leilani | Also executive producer |
| 2020 | Coastal Elites | Callie Josephson | |
| 2022 | Vengeance | Eloise | |
| 2023 | Spider-Man: Across the Spider-Verse | Jess Drew / Spider-Woman | Voice role |
| 2023 | Barbie | President Barbie | |
| 2023 | American Fiction | Sintara Golden | |
| 2026 | The Super Mario Galaxy Movie | Honey Queen | Voice cameo |
| 2026 | Babies | Becky | |
| 2027 | Spider-Man: Beyond the Spider-Verse † | Jess Drew / Spider-Woman | Voice role; In production |

Key
| † | Denotes films that have not yet been released |

=== Television ===
| Year | Title | Role | Notes |
|---|---|---|---|
| 2012–2013 | Awkward Black Girl | J | Main cast; also creator; director and writer for episode: "The Sleepover"; producer for episode: "The Check" |
| 2012 | The Couple | Lisa | Episode: "Exes and Texts" |
| 2012–2013 | The Number | Lisa | 6 episodes |
| 2013 | True Friendship Society | Mama Moth | Episode: "Pilot Part Two" |
| 2013 | My Roommate the | J | Episode: "Awkward Black Girl" |
| 2013 | Instacurity | Issa | Episodes: "The Birthday Party" and "Instacurity PSA" |
| 2013 | Little Horribles | Best Friend | Episode: "Sexual Activity"; also executive producer (3 episodes) |
| 2014 | Rubberhead | Bride 2 | Television film; segment: "Absorption" |
| 2016–2021 | Insecure | Issa Dee | Main cast; also creator & writer |
| 2018 | BoJack Horseman | Dr. Indira (voice) | 2 episodes |
| 2019–2021 | A Black Lady Sketch Show | Various | 6 episodes; also executive producer (16 episodes) |
| 2020 | Saturday Night Live | Herself (host) | Episode: "Issa Rae/Justin Bieber" |
| 2020 | Sesame Street | The Queen/The Princess | Episode: "Cardboard Castle" |
| 2020 | BlackAF | Herself | Episode: "yo, between you and me... this is because of slavery" |
| 2022 | Roar | Wanda Shepard | Episode: "The Woman Who Disappeared" |
| 2022 | The Hair Tales | Herself | |
| 2023 | Young Love | Angela Love (voice) | TV Series; 24 Episodes |
| 2025 | No Taste Like Home with Antoni Porowski | Herself | Episode: "Issa Rae's Senegalese Royal Roots" |
| 2025 | Black Mirror | Brandy Friday | Episode: "Hotel Reverie" |
| 2025 | Seen & Heard: The History of Black Television | Herself | Also executive producer |

=== As producer only ===
| Year | Title | Credits | Notes |
|---|---|---|---|
| 2013 | How Men Become Dogs | Executive producer | 9 episodes |
| 2013 | Little Horribles | Executive producer | 3 episodes |
| 2013 | Inside Web Series | Executive producer | Television documentary |
| 2013 | Black Actress | Producer | |
| 2013–2014 | Roomieloverfriends | Executive producer | 4 episodes |
| 2013–2015 | The Choir | Executive producer; director (2 episodes); writer (12 episodes) | |
| 2014 | Hard Times | Executive producer | Short film |
| 2014 | So Jaded | Executive producer | Television film |
| 2014 | Words with Girls | Executive producer | Television film |
| 2014 | Bleach | Executive producer | Television film |
| 2014–2015 | First | Co-executive producer (10 episodes); co-producer (1 episode) | |
| 2015 | Get Your Life | Executive producer | |
| 2015 | Killing Lazarus | Producer | |
| 2022 | Sweet Life: Los Angeles | Creator and executive producer | |
| 2022 | Rap Shit | Creator, executive producer and writer | |
| 2025 | One of Them Days | Producer | |

=== Music videos ===
| Year | Song | Artist | Role |
|---|---|---|---|
| 2013 | "Happy" | Pharrell Williams | Dancer |
| 2017 | "Moonlight" | Jay-Z | Rachel Green |
| 2017 | "Spice Girl" | Aminé | Girlfriend |
| 2018 | "Nice for What" | Drake | Herself |
| 2019 | "Kinda Love" | TeaMarrr | Therapist |
| 2020 | "Lights On" | D Smoke, SiR | Stripper |
| 2020 | "Entrepreneur" | Pharrell Williams, Jay-Z | Herself |

== Awards and nominations ==
| Award | Year | Work | Category | Result | Ref. |
|---|---|---|---|---|---|
| Astra Film and Creative Awards | 2024 | Barbie | Best Cast Ensemble | Nominated | |
| Austin Film Critics Association | 2023 | Barbie | Best Ensemble | Nominated | |
| BET Awards | 2017 | Insecure | Best Actress | Nominated | |
| BET Awards | 2018 | Insecure | Best Actress | Nominated | |
| BET Awards | 2020 | Insecure | Best Actress | Won | |
| BET Awards | 2021 | Insecure | Best Actress | Nominated | |
| BET Awards | 2022 | Insecure | Best Actress | Nominated | |
| Black Film Critics Circle | 2023 | American Fiction | Best Ensemble | Won | |
| Black Reel Awards | 2017 | Insecure | Outstanding Writing in a Comedy Series | Nominated | |
| Black Reel Awards | 2017 | Insecure | Outstanding Comedy Series | Nominated | |
| Black Reel Awards | 2017 | Insecure | Outstanding Actress in a Comedy Series | Won | |
| Black Reel Awards | 2018 | Insecure | Outstanding Actress in a Comedy Series | Won | |
| Black Reel Awards | 2018 | Insecure | Outstanding Writing in a Comedy Series | Nominated | |
| Black Reel Awards | 2018 | Insecure | Outstanding Comedy Series | Nominated | |
| Black Reel Awards | 2019 | Insecure | Outstanding Actress in a Comedy Series | Won | |
| Black Reel Awards | 2019 | Insecure | Outstanding Writing in a Comedy Series | Nominated | |
| Black Reel Awards | 2020 | Insecure | Outstanding Actress in a Comedy Series | Won | |
| Black Reel Awards | 2020 | Insecure | Outstanding Comedy Series | Won | |
| Black Reel Awards | 2020 | A Black Lady Sketch Show | Outstanding Guest Actress in a Comedy Series | Nominated | |
| Columbus Film Critics Association | 2024 | Barbie | Best Ensemble | Nominated | |
| Critics' Choice Movie Awards | 2024 | Barbie | Best Acting Ensemble | Nominated | |
| Critics' Choice Television Awards | 2019 | Insecure | Best Actress in a Comedy Series | Nominated | |
| Critics' Choice Television Awards | 2021 | Insecure | Best Actress in a Comedy Series | Nominated | |
| Critics' Choice Television Awards | 2022 | Insecure | Best Actress in a Comedy Series | Nominated | |
| Film Independent Spirit Awards | 2026 | Seen & Heard: The History of Black Television | Best New Non-Scripted or Documentary Series | Nominated | |
| Florida Film Critics Circle | 2023 | Barbie | Best Ensemble | Nominated | |
| Georgia Film Critics Association Awards | 2024 | American Fiction | Best Ensemble | Nominated | |
| Georgia Film Critics Association Awards | 2024 | Barbie | Best Ensemble | Nominated | |
| Golden Globe Awards | 2017 | Insecure | Best Actress in a Television Series – Musical or Comedy | Nominated | |
| Golden Globe Awards | 2018 | Insecure | Best Actress in a Television Series – Musical or Comedy | Nominated | |
| Golden Globe Awards | 2022 | Insecure | Best Actress in a Television Series – Musical or Comedy | Nominated | |
| Gotham Awards | 2020 | Rap Shit | Breakthrough Series - Shortform | Nominated | |
| Gracie Awards | 2018 | Insecure | Outstanding Female Actor in a Leading Role in a Comedy or Musical | Won | |
| Houston Film Critics Society | 2023 | Barbie | Best Ensemble Cast | Nominated | |
| MTV Movie & TV Awards | 2017 | Insecure | Next Generation | Nominated | |
| MTV Movie & TV Awards | 2018 | Insecure | Best Performance in a Show | Nominated | |
| MTV Movie & TV Awards | 2021 | Insecure | Best Comedic Performance | Nominated | |
| NAACP Image Awards | 2017 | Insecure | Outstanding Actress in a Comedy Series | Nominated | |
| NAACP Image Awards | 2017 | Insecure | Outstanding Writing in a Comedy Series | Nominated | |
| NAACP Image Awards | 2018 | Insecure | Outstanding Actress in a Comedy Series | Nominated | |
| NAACP Image Awards | 2018 | Insecure | Outstanding Writing in a Comedy Series | Nominated | |
| NAACP Image Awards | 2018 | Herself | Entertainer of the Year | Nominated | |
| NAACP Image Awards | 2019 | Insecure | Outstanding Actress in a Comedy Series | Nominated | |
| NAACP Image Awards | 2019 | BoJack Horseman | Outstanding Character Voice-Over Performance (Television or Film) | Nominated | |
| NAACP Image Awards | 2021 | The Photograph | Outstanding Actress in a Motion Picture | Nominated | |
| NAACP Image Awards | 2021 | Saturday Night Live | Outstanding Guest Performance in a Comedy or Drama Series | Nominated | |
| NAACP Image Awards | 2021 | Insecure | Outstanding Actress in a Comedy Series | Won | |
| NAACP Image Awards | 2021 | Insecure | Outstanding Writing in a Comedy Series | Nominated | |
| NAACP Image Awards | 2022 | Insecure | Outstanding Actress in a Comedy Series | Won | |
| NAACP Image Awards | 2022 | Insecure | Outstanding Writing in a Comedy Series | Won | |
| NAACP Image Awards | 2024 | American Fiction | Outstanding Ensemble Cast in a Motion Picture | Nominated | |
| NAACP Image Awards | 2024 | Spider-Man: Across the Spider-Verse | Outstanding Character Voice Performance – Motion Picture | Won | |
| NAACP Image Awards | 2024 | Young Love | Outstanding Character Voice-Over Performance (Television) | Nominated | |
| NAMIC Vision Awards | 2017 | Insecure | Best Performance - Comedy | Won | |
| NAMIC Vision Awards | 2021 | Insecure | Best Performance - Comedy | Won | |
| NAMIC Vision Awards | 2022 | Insecure | Best Performance - Comedy | Nominated | |
| North Carolina Film Critics Association | 2024 | Barbie | Best Acting Ensemble | Nominated | |
| Peabody Award | 2022 | Herself | Trailblazer Award | Won | |
| People's Choice Awards | 2020 | The Lovebirds | Female Movie Star of the Year | Nominated | |
| People's Choice Awards | 2020 | The Lovebirds | Comedy Movie Star of the Year | Nominated | |
| People's Choice Awards | 2020 | The Photograph | Drama Movie Star of the Year | Nominated | |
| People's Choice Awards | 2020 | Insecure | Comedy TV Star of the Year | Nominated | |
| Portland Critics Association | 2024 | Barbie | Best Ensemble Cast | Nominated | |
| Primetime Emmy Awards | 2018 | Insecure | Outstanding Lead Actress in a Comedy Series | Nominated | |
| Primetime Emmy Awards | 2020 | Insecure | Outstanding Lead Actress in a Comedy Series | Nominated | |
| Primetime Emmy Awards | 2020 | Insecure | Outstanding Comedy Series | Nominated | |
| Primetime Emmy Awards | 2020 | A Black Lady Sketch Show | Outstanding Variety Sketch Series | Nominated | |
| Primetime Emmy Awards | 2021 | A Black Lady Sketch Show | Outstanding Guest Actress in a Comedy Series | Nominated | |
| Primetime Emmy Awards | 2022 | A Black Lady Sketch Show | Outstanding Variety Sketch Series | Nominated | |
| Primetime Emmy Awards | 2022 | Insecure | Outstanding Lead Actress in a Comedy Series | Nominated | |
| Producers Guild of America Awards | 2022 | Herself | Visionary Award | Won | |
| San Diego Film Critics Society | 2023 | Barbie | Best Ensemble | Runner-up | |
| Satellite Awards | 2018 | Insecure | Best Actress in a Television Series – Musical or Comedy | Won | |
| Satellite Awards | 2019 | Insecure | Best Actress in a Television Series – Musical or Comedy | Nominated | |
| Satellite Awards | 2021 | Insecure | Best Actress in a Television Series – Musical or Comedy | Nominated | |
| Screen Actors Guild Awards | 2024 | American Fiction | Outstanding Performance by a Cast in a Motion Picture | Nominated | |
| Screen Actors Guild Awards | 2024 | Barbie | Outstanding Performance by a Cast in a Motion Picture | Nominated | |
| Seattle Film Critics Society Awards | 2024 | Barbie | Best Ensemble Cast | Nominated | |
| St. Louis Film Critics Association | 2023 | Barbie | Best Ensemble | Runner-up | |
| Streamy Awards | 2018 | Giants | Best Drama Series | Won | |
| TCA Awards | 2017 | Insecure | Individual Achievement in Comedy | Nominated | |
| TCA Awards | 2020 | Insecure | Individual Achievement in Comedy | Nominated | |
| Utah Film Critics Association | 2024 | Barbie | Best Ensemble Cast | Nominated | |
| Washington D.C. Area Film Critics Association Awards | 2023 | American Fiction | Best Ensemble | Nominated | |
| Washington D.C. Area Film Critics Association Awards | 2023 | Barbie | Best Ensemble | Nominated | |
| Webby Awards | 2019 | Herself | Video Person of the Year | Won | |

== Works and publications ==
- Rae, Issa (2015). The Misadventures of Awkward Black Girl. New York, NY: 37 Ink/Atria – Simon & Schuster. ISBN 9781476749051. OCLC 901338241.
