= Dewayne Perkins =

American comedian

- Born: November 5, 1990 (age 35); Chicago, Illinois, U.S.
- Education: DePaul University (BA)
- Occupations: Comedian, writer, actor, producer
- Notable work: The Blackening

Dewayne Perkins (born November 5, 1990) is an American comedian, writer, actor, and producer. Born and raised in Chicago, he received improv training at The Second City and also worked for iO Theater. His stand-up comedy was recommended by Variety magazine and Just for Laughs comedy festival.

He has appeared on Wild 'n Out and The Upshaws. Perkins was on the writing staff for The Break with Michelle Wolf, the Saved by the Bell reboot, and Brooklyn Nine-Nine, and he is a staff writer for The Amber Ruffin Show, for which he was nominated for a Primetime Emmy Award. He is the co-writer and star of horror-comedy film The Blackening.

== Early life and education ==
Perkins was born in Chicago, Illinois and was raised on the south side near Marquette Park. He attended Hearst Elementary School and graduated from Curie High School. He was the first African American male student to receive an International Baccalaureate Diploma from his high school.

Perkins developed his interest in performing through musical theater and improv classes in high school. He attended The Theatre School at DePaul University but was cut after his first year and changed his major to film and animation, where he was introduced to The Second City by his best friend and writing partner Aasia Lashay Bullock. They were hired there after a producer saw his and Bullock's original show Uncle Tom & Jerry Curl: A Black History Month Experience. Perkins received his bachelor's degree from DePaul.

== Career ==
=== 2016–2019: Stand-up and television writing ===
After college Perkins continued to work at Second City and as a performer at iO theater, and was a member of the improv trio 3Peat. In 2016, he wrote and performed Black Side of the Moon at Woolly Mammoth Theater in D.C.

He left Second City in 2017 to pursue stand-up. When he transitioned to stand-up, he stated that using Twitter improved his joke writing. His work frequently covers issues of identity such as his race and sexuality.

In April 2018, 3Peat's sketch The Blackening was released online on Comedy Central, about "an all-Black group of friends (who ain't got no business camping) as they get chased by a serial killer." The sketch originated from a variety show sketch Perkins produced at Second City. He was hired to write for the sole season of The Break with Michelle Wolf in 2018. He later relocated to Los Angeles and joined the writing staff for season seven of Brooklyn Nine-Nine. In both writer's rooms he was the only Black writer.

=== 2020–present: Television production and The Blackening ===
In January 2020, it was announced that The Blackening would be adapted into a full-length film, to be co-written with Tracy Oliver and developed by MRC Film and The Story Company. Directed by Tim Story and starring Perkins, Antoinette Robertson, Jermaine Fowler, Yvonne Orji, and Jay Pharoah, the film wrapped production in December 2021. The film was released at TIFF in September 2022.

Perkins is a writer for The Amber Ruffin Show and was also a writer for the Saved By the Bell reboot, both released on Peacock in 2020.

In June 2020, Perkins posted a viral Twitter thread alleging institutional racism during his time at The Second City. He "criticized Second City prior’s reluctance to fundraise for the Black Lives Matter movement without also financially supporting police-related causes." He alleged that he and other Black performers were required to see a dialect coach to make their speaking voices more "palatable." He further stated in an interview with The New York Times that he had heard directors use anti-Black slurs, and was traumatized by his overall experience. Several other Black performers replied to the thread. The next day, Second City co-owner Andrew Alexander resigned.

In 2021, Perkins joined the cast of The Upshaws in a recurring role. Perkins will write and executive produce the workplace sitcom Chopped & Screwed for ABC in collaboration with Phoebe Robinson. The show is a multi-camera sitcom centered on a Black barbershop and beauty salon that must come together as one entity to serve the superficial and therapeutic needs of their customers and community. In 2022 it was announced that Perkins will executive produce and write Clue, an animated television series adaptation based on the 1985 film. Tim Story will also co-executive produce the series for Fox and Bento Box Entertainment.

The Blackening was released in theaters nationwide on Juneteenth weekend 2023 and grossed $17.7 million on a $5 million microbudget. In November 2023 it was announced that Perkins and co-writer Tracy Oliver are developing a sequel. He signed with CAA in June 2023. Perkins is also a writer for Sausage Party: Foodtopia.

He is a recurring character in Seth Rogen's Apple TV+ comedy series The Studio. In October 2026 he debuted the independently-produced YouTube series I Swear We're Friends centering on a circle of Black queer friends. Each episode is inspired by one of six iconic series: Girlfriends, Succession, 24, My Wife & Kids, Charmed and Touched By An Angel.

== Personal life ==
Perkins is gay. He came out to his family when he was a teenager, who he described as supportive.

== Accolades ==
- 2017 – Best Short-Form Digital Project, New York Television Festival - for Starving Artists in collaboration with Aasia Lashay Bullock
- 2019 – New Faces of Comedy, Just for Laughs
- 2020 – 10 Comics to Watch, Variety

== Awards and nominations ==
Year	Award	Category	Nominated work	Result	Ref.
2021	Primetime Emmy Awards	Outstanding Writing for A Variety Series	The Amber Ruffin Show	Nominated	
2021	Television Critics Association Awards	Outstanding Achievement in Variety, Talk, or Sketch	The Amber Ruffin Show	Nominated	
2021	Writers Guild of America Awards	Comedy/Variety Sketch Series	The Amber Ruffin Show	Nominated	
2024	Black Reel Awards	Outstanding Breakthrough Performance	The Blackening	Nominated	
2024	Fangoria Chainsaw Awards	Best Lead Performance	The Blackening	Nominated	
2024	Fangoria Chainsaw Awards	Editorial Eye on the Future Award	The Blackening	Won	
2024	NAACP Image Awards	Outstanding Breakthrough Creative (Motion Picture)	The Blackening	Nominated	

== Filmography ==
=== Television ===
Year	Title	Role	Notes	Ref.
2012	Underemployed	Jester	1 episode	
2016	Starving Artists	Himself	Web series; also director and writer	
2017	Wild 'n Out	Himself		
2018	The Break with Michelle Wolf	N/A	Writer	
2018	3Peat Presents: The Blackening	Dewayne	TV short; also writer	
2019	Comedy Central Stand-Up Featuring	Himself	Stand-up special	
2020–2021	Brooklyn Nine-Nine	N/A	Writer, producer	
2020–2022	Saved by the Bell	Ray	Recurring role; Also writer and producer	
2020–present	The Amber Ruffin Show	N/A	Writer	
2021–2026	The Upshaws	Hector	Recurring role	
2024–present	Sausage Party: Foodtopia	N/A	Writer	
2025–present	The Studio	Tyler	Recurring role	
2026	I Swear We're Friends	Billy	Creator, co-writer, director, and star. Web series.	
TBA	Chopped & Screwed		Writer and executive producer; pre-production	
TBA	Clue		Writer and executive producer; pre-production	

=== Film ===
Year	Title	Role	Notes	Ref.
2012	Roundabout American	Cop		
2014	Animals	Pedestrian		
2015	Followed	George		
2018	The Bobby Roberts Project	Ray Jay		
2022	The Blackening	Dewayne	Also writer, producer	
2025	One of Them Days	Jameel		
TBA	Wrong Number †		In production	
