= Black Reel Award for Outstanding Supporting Actress, Comedy Series =

Annual US television award

- Awarded for: Outstanding Supporting Actress, Comedy Series
- Country: United States
- Presented by: Black Reel Awards for Television
- First award: 2017
- Currently held by: Gabrielle Dennis, A Black Lady Sketch Show (2021)
- Website: blackreelawards.com

The Black Reel Award for Television for Outstanding Supporting Actress, Comedy Series was first introduced in 2017 and won by Jenifer Lewis for Black-ish. Lewis holds the record for most wins in this category with 3 (consecutively) and most nominations with 4.

== Winners and nominees ==
Winners are listed first and highlighted in bold.

=== 2010s ===
Year	Actress	Series	Network	Ref
2017
2017	**Jenifer Lewis**	**Black-ish**	**ABC**	
2017	Tichina Arnold	Survivor's Remorse	Starz	
2017	Yara Shahidi	Black-ish	ABC	
2017	Leslie Jones	Saturday Night Live	NBC	
2017	Yvonne Orji	Insecure	HBO	
2018
2018	**Jenifer Lewis**	**Black-ish**	**ABC**	
2018	Tichina Arnold	Survivor's Remorse	Starz	
2018	Zazie Beetz	Atlanta	FX	
2018	Antoinette Robertson	Dear White People	Netflix	
2018	Yvonne Orji	Insecure	HBO	
2019
2019	**Jenifer Lewis**	**Black-ish**	**ABC**	
2019	Marsai Martin	Black-ish	ABC	
2019	Leslie Jones	Saturday Night Live	NBC	
2019	Natasha Rothwell	Insecure	HBO	
2019	Yvonne Orji	Insecure	HBO	

=== 2020s ===
Year	Actor	Series	Network	Ref
2020
2020	**Yvonne Orji**	**Insecure**	**HBO**	
2020	Marsai Martin	Black-ish	ABC	
2020	Regina Hall	Black Monday	Showtime	
2020	Jenifer Lewis	Black-ish	ABC	
2020	Natasha Rothwell	Insecure	HBO	
2021
2021	**Gabrielle Dennis**	**A Black Lady Sketch Show**	**HBO**	
2021	Jenifer Lewis	Black-ish	ABC	
2021	Ashley Nicole Black	A Black Lady Sketch Show	HBO	
2021	Wanda Sykes	The Upshaws	Netflix	
2021	Naomi Ackie	Master of None	Netflix	

== Superlatives ==
Superlative	Outstanding Supporting Actress, Comedy Series
Actress with most awards	Jenifer Lewis (3)
Actress with most nominations	Jenifer Lewis(5)
Actress with most nominations without ever winning	Tichina Arnold (2), Leslie Jones (2), Marsai Martin (2), Natasha Rothwell (2)

== Programs with multiple awards ==
3 awards

- Black-ish

== Performers with multiple awards ==
3 awards

- Jenifer Lewis (3 consecutive)

== Programs with multiple nominations ==
8 nominations

- Black-ish

6 nominations

- Insecure

2 nominations

- A Black Lady Sketch Show
- Saturday Night Live
- Survivor's Remorse

== Performers with multiple nominations ==
5 nominations

- Jenifer Lewis

4 nominations

- Yvonne Orji

2 nominations

- Tichina Arnold
- Leslie Jones
- Marsai Martin
- Natasha Rothwell

== Total awards by network ==
- ABC - 3
- HBO - 2
