= Shamika Cotton =

American actress from Cincinnati, Ohio

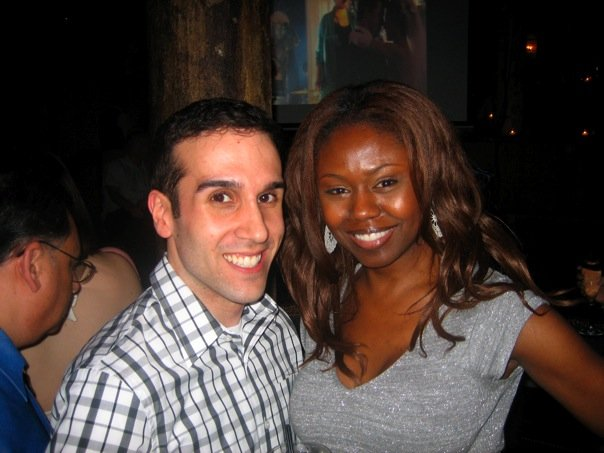
- Shamika Cotton with her friend Bob Ketchum at The Wire wrap party
- Born: Cincinnati, Ohio, U.S.
- Education: Central State University
- Occupation: Actress
- Years active: 2003–present

Shamika Cotton is an American actress from Cincinnati, Ohio. She is perhaps best known to television viewers as Michael Lee's drug-addicted mother Raylene Lee in the acclaimed HBO series The Wire.

== Early years ==
Born in Cincinnati, Ohio, Shamika Cotton graduated from Withrow High School, where her activities included studying advanced chemistry and playing softball and volleyball, in 1994 and from Cincinnati's competitive School for Creative and Performing Arts, where she studied choir, flute, and theater. She graduated from Central State University in 1999 with a degree in manufacturing engineering.

== Career ==
In 2006, Cotton appeared on the I Wanna Be A Soap Star reality series to good reviews, and her performances from the show were also highlighted on Entertainment Tonight.

In November, 2007, Cotton launched a weekly videocast on YouTube entitled the “Shamika Chronicles”, a series that follows her life and offers a realistic look at the daily life and work of an aspiring actress.

In 2019, she played small role in the movie The Sun Is Also a Star.

== Filmography ==
=== Film/Movie ===
Year	Title	Role	Notes
2004	Till Death Do Us Part	-	Short
2009	Stream	Young Jodi	Short
2011	Pariah	Candace	
2013	Frank the Bastard	Isolda	
2015	Sidewalk Traffic	Nanny Moon	
2019	The Sun Is Also a Star	Hannah	

=== Television ===
Year	Title	Role	Notes
2003	Nickelodeon Magazine's Big 10 Birthday Bash	Herself	TV special
2006	As the World Turns	ER Doctor	2 episodes
2006-08	The Wire	Raylene Lee	Recurring cast: Season 4, guest: Season 5
2007	Law & Order: Criminal Intent	Kira Danforth	Episode: "Self-made"
2010	Law & Order	Mrs. Dolan	Episode: "Boy on Fire"
2013	Law & Order: Special Victims Unit	Carol McEwan	Episode: "Beautiful Frame"
2014-15	Forever	Anita	Recurring cast
2016	Gotham	Officer Holt	Episode: "Wrath of the Villains: Mr. Freeze"
2019	The Blacklist	FBI Physician	Episode: "Dr. Hans Koehler (No. 33)"
2019	The Good Fight	Wendy	Episode: "The One About the Recent Troubles"
2019	God Friended Me	Jen	Episode: "Return to Sender"
2019	Elementary	Rose	Episode: "Their Last Bow"
2019	Blue Bloods	Detective Kim Andrews	Episode: "Naughty or Nice"
2019	New Amsterdam	Martha Randle	Episode: "The Island"
2020	Prodigal Son	Joanne	Episode: "Stranger Beside You"
2021	The Equalizer	Nicole	Episode: "Reckoning"
2022	P-Valley	Farrah Haynes	Recurring cast: season 2
