= Yara Shahidi =

American actress and producer (born 2000)

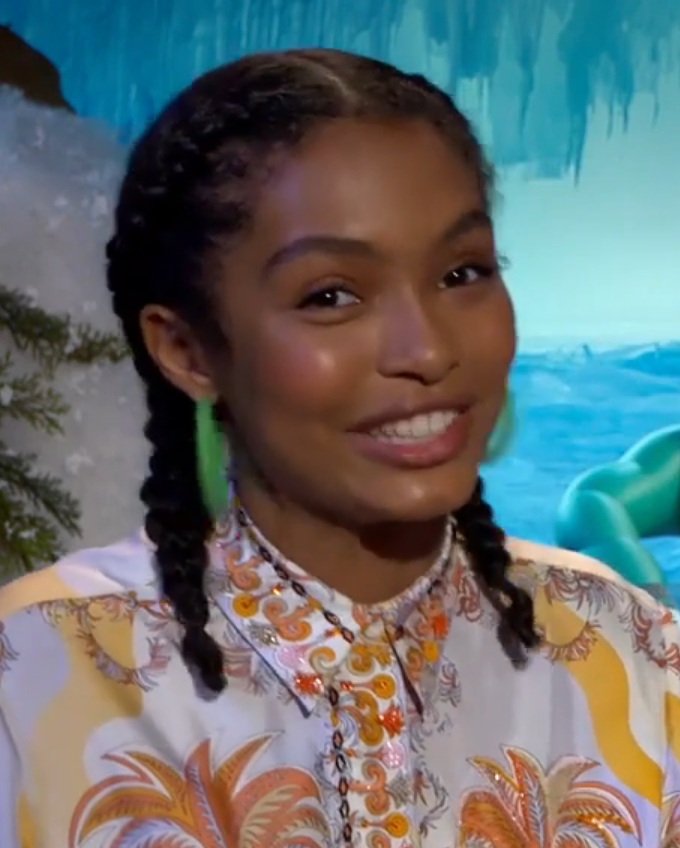
- Shahidi in a 2018 interview
- Born: Yara Sayeh Shahidi; February 10, 2000 (age 26); Minneapolis, Minnesota, U.S.
- Education: Harvard University (BA)
- Occupations: Actress; producer
- Years active: 2006–present
- Relatives: Sayeed Shahidi (brother); Nas (cousin); Olu Dara (great-uncle)
- Website: yarashahidi.com

Yara Sayeh Shahidi (born February 10, 2000) is an American actress and producer. She began her career as a child, appearing in the films Imagine That (2009), Butter (2011), and Alex Cross (2012).

Shahidi played a starring role as the oldest daughter Zoey Johnson in the ABC sitcom Black-ish (2014–2022) and its spin-off series Grown-ish (2018–2024). She received NAACP Image Award for Outstanding Supporting Actress in a Comedy Series for Black-ish and three NAACP Image Award for Outstanding Actress in a Comedy Series nominations for Grown-ish. Time included her on "The 30 Most Influential Teens of 2016" list. She did voice over work in the films Smallfoot (2018), Fearless (2020), PAW Patrol: The Movie (2021), and My Father's Dragon (2022).

Shahidi played her first adult lead role in the 2019 drama film, The Sun Is Also a Star. In 2023, she played Tinker Bell in the fantasy adventure film Peter Pan & Wendy, and executive produced and starred in the romantic comedy-drama film, Sitting in Bars with Cake.

== Early life and education ==
Yara Sayeh Shahidi was born in Minneapolis, Minnesota, to Keri Salter Shahidi and Afshin Shahidi, a photographer. Her mother, Keri Shahidi (born Keri Jamelda Salter), is of African American and Choctaw heritage, and her father Afshin Shahidi is Iranian. Afshin was one of the principal photographers for musician Prince, who kept a signed photo of Yara in his editing suite at Paisley Park. The Shahidi family moved to California for Afshin's work when Yara was 4 years old. She is the older sister of child actor and model Sayeed Shahidi and they have a younger brother, Ehsan. The rapper Nas is her first cousin once removed. Yara means "Someone who is close to your heart" in Persian; Shahidi is a common surname in Iran and means "martyr" in Persian.

Shahidi attended the Immaculate Heart School for middle and high school. She left to concentrate on her acting career, graduating in 2017 from Dwight Global Online School. In 2017, Shahidi was admitted to Harvard University. She began her studies there in 2018 after taking a gap year, with a plan to major in Interdisciplinary Sociology and Black American Studies. Shahidi graduated from Harvard in 2022.

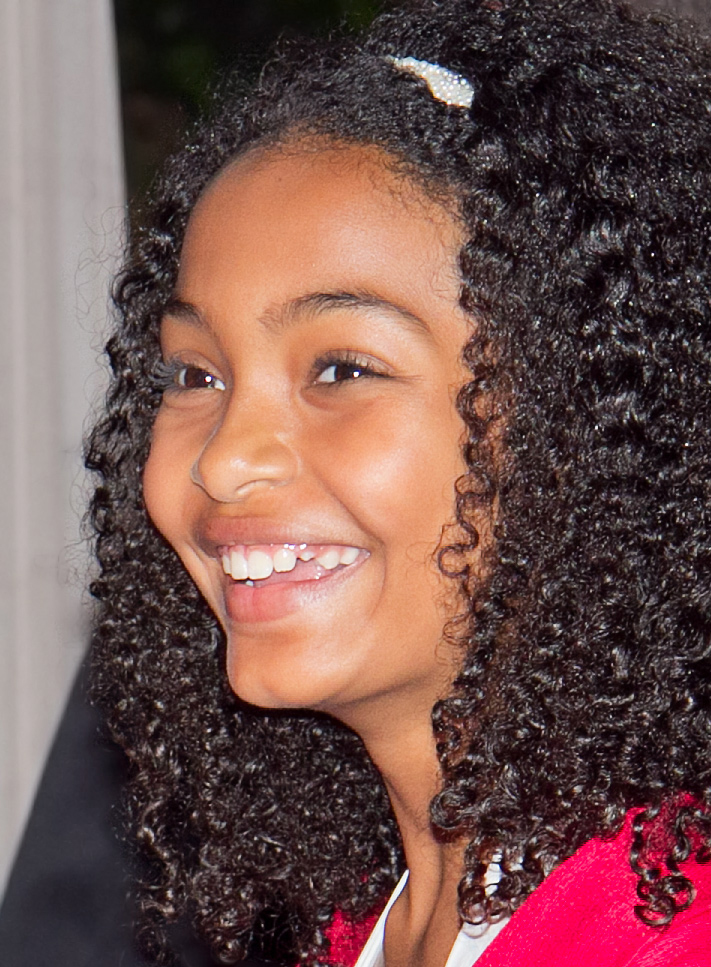
Shahidi at the 2011 Toronto International Film Festival

== Acting career ==
Shahidi began her career when she was 6 years old, appearing in television commercials and print advertisements for companies such as McDonald's, Ralph Lauren, Target, GapKids, Disney, Guess Kids and The Children's Place. She frequently worked with her mother and younger brother in various print and broadcast campaigns. Her first on-screen appearance was in an episode of HBO comedy series, Entourage in 2007. In 2009, she had a recurring role as Jessica St. Clair's character daughter in the short-lived ABC comedy series, In the Motherhood. Later that year, she guest-starred on Cold Case and Wizards of Waverly Place.

Shahidi made her big screen debut in 2009, starring opposite Eddie Murphy in Paramount Pictures comedy film Imagine That, for which she received a Young Artist Award nomination for Best Leading Young Actress in a Feature Film. She also appeared in the action film Salt in 2010 as a next door neighbor to Angelina Jolie's character. The following year, she starred in the comedy film Butter that premiered at the Telluride Film Festival and garnered mixed reviews from critics. In 2012, she appeared in the action thriller film Alex Cross opposite Tyler Perry. From 2012 to 2013, Shahidi was a regular cast member in the syndicated sitcom The First Family playing the role of Chloe Johnson, the daughter of President William Johnson. In 2013, she played young Olivia Pope in two episodes of the third season of ABC political thriller series, Scandal.

=== 2014–2022 ===
In 2014, Shahidi was cast as a 14-year-old Zoey Johnson, the eldest daughter of Anthony Anderson and Tracee Ellis Ross's characters in the ABC comedy series Black-ish created by Kenya Barris. She won an NAACP Image Award for Outstanding Supporting Actress in a Comedy Series for the show's first season. She also received Gracie Award for Outstanding Female Actor in a Breakthrough Role in 2016 and BET YoungStars Award at the 17th BET Awards. She left the series after three seasons but appeared as a recurring guest-star in latter seasons. ABC announced in 2017 that Shahidi would be headlining a Black-ish spinoff, titled Grown-ish, on its sister network Freeform. The series premiered on January 3, 2018, with the positive reviews from critics. For her performance, Shahidi received three NAACP Image Awards nominations for Outstanding Actress in a Comedy Series. She left the series after five seasons, but stayed as an executive producer and recurring guest-star for its sixth and final season in 2023.

In 2016, Shahidi signed to model with New York's Women Management modeling agency, in hopes of providing a platform for more women of color. Time included her on "The 30 Most Influential Teens of 2016" list. She was ranked one of the best dressed women in 2018 by fashion website Net-a-Porter. She was one of fifteen women selected to appear on the cover of the September 2019 issue of British Vogue, by guest editor Meghan, Duchess of Sussex. In 2021, Shahidi debuted a sportswear collaboration with Adidas.

In 2019, Shahidi played the leading role in the teen drama film, The Sun Is Also a Star based on the young adult novel of the same name by Nicola Yoon. It was theatrically released in the United States on May 17, 2019, by Warner Bros. Pictures and Metro-Goldwyn-Mayer Pictures. The film received mixed reviews from critics and grossed $6.8 million worldwide. She co-produced Academy Award for Best Animated Short Film-winning film Hair Love (2019). She did voice over work in the films Smallfoot (2018), Fearless (2020), PAW Patrol: The Movie (2021), and My Father's Dragon (2022). In 2020, Shahidi and her mother launched their production company 7th Sun and signed a deal with ABC Studios to produce shows. Their first project was Smoakland, a single-camera comedy pilot for Freeform in 2021. Later in 2021, it was announced that they develop adaptation of Cole Brown's book Greyboy: Finding Blackness in a White World.

=== 2023–present ===
Shahidi starred in the Apple TV+ anthology series Extrapolations that premiered on March 17, 2023. She played Tinker Bell in the fantasy adventure film Peter Pan & Wendy, a remake of Peter Pan. It premiered on Disney+ on April 28, 2023. Later in 2023, Shahidi executive produced and played the leading role in the romantic comedy-drama film Sitting in Bars with Cake alongside Odessa A'zion. The film received generally positive reviews from critics with Shahidi's performance as a law student struggling to fulfill her role as a caregiver to her friend diagnosed with cancer receiving praise, though critics generally agreed that she had been overshadowed by A’Zion. Carla Meyer of the San Francisco Chronicle felt that Shahidi's friendship with A’Zion was, "the most authentic element of the film". She received NAACP Image Award for Outstanding Actress in a Motion Picture nomination for her performance.

Shahidi was set to star alongside Maddie Ziegler and Avantika in the thriller Pretty Lethal but exited the film.

== Political activism ==
Shahidi founded Eighteen x 18 with social news publisher NowThis, which "will be a platform to encourage [her] peers to vote for the very first time in our upcoming midterm elections." Her other organizations include Yara's Club, a partnership with Young Women's Leadership Network (YWLN) of New York, which provides online mentorship in hopes to end poverty through education.

Shahidi's activism was noticed by former first lady Michelle Obama, who wrote her a letter of recommendation to Harvard University. She was also given the opportunity by Teen Vogue to interview Hillary Clinton in 2017.

In 2021, Shahidi joined the Dior Stand with Women campaign.

In October 2023, Shahidi signed an open letter for the "Artists4Ceasefire" campaign urging US President Joe Biden to push for a ceasefire in the Gaza war.

== Filmography ==
=== Film ===
Year	Title	Role	Notes
2009	Imagine That	Olivia Danielson	
2010	Salt	Salt's Young Neighbor	
2010	Unthinkable	Katie	
2011	Butter	Destiny	
2012	Alex Cross	Janelle Cross	
2018	Smallfoot	Brenda	Voice role
2019	The Sun Is Also a Star	Natasha Kingsley	
2019	Hair Love	—N/a	Co-executive producer
2020	Fearless	Melanie	Voice role
2021	Paw Patrol: The Movie	Kendra Wilson	Voice role
2022	My Father's Dragon	Callie	Voice role
2023	Peter Pan & Wendy	Tinker Bell	
2023	Sitting in Bars with Cake	Jane	Executive producer
2026	Street Smart	Stella	
2027	The Beekeeper 2	TBA	Post-production
TBA	One Attempt Remaining	TBA	Filming

=== Television ===
Year	Title	Role	Notes
2007	Entourage	Kandace West	1 episode
2009	In the Motherhood	Esther	5 episodes
2009	Cold Case	Meesha Sullivan '91	1 episode
2009	Wizards of Waverly Place	Olive	1 episode
2010	Lie to Me	Olivia	1 episode
2010	$♯*! My Dad Says	Girl Scout	1 episode
2011	The Cape	Layla	1 episode
2011	Family Guy	Little Girl	Voice role; 1 episode
2011	Rip City	Montana	Television film
2012	The Finder	Adina	1 episode
2012–2013	The First Family	Chloe Johnson	23 episodes
2013	Scandal	Young Olivia Pope	2 episodes
2014	Bad Teacher	Jalissa	1 episode
2014	The Fosters	Maddie	2 episodes
2014–2022	Black-ish	Zoey Johnson	Main role (seasons 1–3), Recurring role (seasons 4–8); 79 episodes
2016–2018	Trollhunters	Darci Scott	Voice role; 10 episodes
2018–2024	Grown-ish	Zoey Johnson	Lead role (seasons 1–5), Recurring role (season 6); Also executive producer
2018–2019	3Below	Darci Scott	Voice role; 8 episodes
2023	Extrapolations	Carmen Jalilo	1 episode

=== Music ===
Year	Title	Artist(s)	Refs.
2018	"Nice for What"	Drake	
2023	"Mosquito"	PinkPantheress	

=== As director ===
Year	Title	Notes	Refs.
2018	Shatterbox	Episode: "X"	
2022	Growing Up	Episode: "Sofia"	

== Discography ==
Year	Title	Artist	Album	Notes
2026	"Birds & the Bees"	Baby Keem	Ca$ino	Producer, writer, additional vocals
2026	"Circus Circus Freestyle"	Baby Keem	Ca$ino	Producer, writer

== Awards and nominations ==
Year	Award	Category	Work	Result
2016	BET Awards	YoungStars Award	Black-ish	Nominated
2017	BET Awards	YoungStars Award	Black-ish	Won
2018	BET Awards	YoungStars Award	Black-ish	Won
2017	Black Reel Awards	Outstanding Supporting Actress, Comedy Series	Black-ish	Nominated
2018	Black Reel Awards	Outstanding Actress, Comedy Series	Grown-ish	Nominated
2021	Black Reel Awards	Outstanding Actress, Comedy Series	Grown-ish	Nominated
2016	Gracie Award	Outstanding Female Actor in a Breakthrough Role	Black-ish	Won
2017	MTV Movie & TV Awards	Best Breakthrough Performance	Black-ish	Nominated
2015	NAACP Image Award	Outstanding Supporting Actress in a Comedy Series	Black-ish	Won
2019	NAACP Image Award	Outstanding Actress in a Comedy Series	Grown-ish	Nominated
2020	NAACP Image Award	Outstanding Actress in a Comedy Series	Grown-ish	Nominated
2021	NAACP Image Award	Outstanding Actress in a Comedy Series	Grown-ish	Nominated
2024	NAACP Image Award	Outstanding Actress in a Motion Picture	Sitting in Bars with Cake	Nominated
2019	People's Choice Awards	The Comedy TV Star of 2019	Grown-ish	Nominated
2020	People's Choice Awards	The Comedy TV Star of 2020	Grown-ish	Nominated
2021	People's Choice Awards	The Female TV Star of 2021	Grown-ish	Nominated
2021	People's Choice Awards	The Comedy TV Star of 2021	Grown-ish	Nominated
2016	Screen Actors Guild Awards	Outstanding Performance by an Ensemble in a Comedy Series	Black-ish	Nominated
2017	Screen Actors Guild Awards	Outstanding Performance by an Ensemble in a Comedy Series	Black-ish	Nominated
2015	Teen Choice Awards	Choice TV: Breakout Star	Black-ish	Nominated
2017	Teen Choice Awards	Choice Comedy TV Actress	Black-ish	Nominated
2018	Teen Choice Awards	Choice Comedy TV Actress	Grown-ish	Nominated
2019	Teen Choice Awards	Choice Summer Movie Actress	The Sun Is Also a Star	Nominated
2019	Teen Choice Awards	Choice Comedy TV Actress	Grown-ish	Nominated
2019	Teen Choice Awards	Choice Summer TV Actress	Grown-ish	Nominated
2010	Young Artist Award	Best Leading Young Actress in a Feature Film	Imagine That	Nominated
2016	Young Artist Award	Best Performance in a TV Series – Leading Teen Actress	Black-ish	Nominated

== See also ==
- List of Iranian-Americans
- List of African Americans
- List of Iranian actresses
