= The Sun Is Also a Star =

2019 teen drama film

- Theatrical release poster
- Directed by: Ry Russo-Young
- Screenplay by: Tracy Oliver
- Based on: The Sun Is Also a Star by Nicola Yoon
- Produced by: Elysa Koplowitz Dutton; Leslie Morgenstein
- Starring: Yara Shahidi; Charles Melton; John Leguizamo
- Cinematography: Autumn Durald
- Edited by: Joe Landauer
- Music by: Herdis Stefánsdóttir
- Production companies: Warner Bros. Pictures; Alloy Entertainment; Metro-Goldwyn-Mayer Pictures
- Distributed by: Warner Bros. Pictures
- Release date: May 17, 2019 (United States)
- Running time: 100 minutes
- Country: United States
- Language: English
- Budget: $9 million
- Box office: $6.8 million

The Sun Is Also a Star is a 2019 American teen romance film directed by Ry Russo-Young and written by Tracy Oliver, based on the 2016 young adult novel by Nicola Yoon. The film stars Yara Shahidi, Charles Melton in his feature film debut, and John Leguizamo, and follows a young couple who fall in love, while one of their families faces deportation.

It was theatrically released in the United States on May 17, 2019, by Warner Bros. Pictures and Metro-Goldwyn-Mayer Pictures. The film received mixed reviews from critics and grossed $6.8 million worldwide.

The film made Charles Melton the first Asian-American actor to lead a teen romance film from a major Hollywood studio.

== Plot ==
Undocumented immigrant Natasha Kingsley lives in New York City with her parents and brother. The day before their deportation to Jamaica, she tearfully pleads their case in the immigration office. She is redirected to Jeremy Martinez, who does pro bono work for such cases.

Korean teenager Daniel Bae is preparing for an interview for Dartmouth. His parents expect him to become a doctor, while his brother, Charles, is dismissive and rude.

Daniel and his friend Omar get on the same delayed subway car as Natasha. When Daniel and Omar get off at Grand Central Station, Daniel notices Natasha wearing a jacket that reads "Deus ex machina", a phrase he had written in his notebook earlier, and decides to follow her.

Daniel sees a car crash into a cyclist and saves Natasha from being hit. Shaken, they sit down and talk. When Natasha says she does not believe in love, Daniel proposes he can make her fall in love with him in one day, and then receives a call moving his interview ahead one day. Now free, Daniel goes to Jeremy's office with Natasha. The assistant informs them that he was hit by a car while biking and is in the hospital.

Daniel and Natasha stop by the shop owned by his parents and then go to a planetarium and a Korean karaoke bar. Natasha imagines their life together, and they share their first kiss. Suddenly remembering her appointment with Jeremy, she rushes out. Daniel chases after her, and she reveals her family's deportation. She meets with Jeremy, who offers to set up a new trial for their case for the next day.

Daniel goes back to his parents' shop and gets into a fight with Charles. He later meets with Natasha, and they go to Roosevelt Island and spend the night outside together.

The next morning, Daniel interviews for Dartmouth with Jeremy. Natasha arrives and learns her whole family must leave the country that day. Daniel leaves the interview early and walks her home to meet her family before they head to the airport.

At the airport, Daniel and Natasha stare deeply into each other's eyes for four minutes. Natasha is shown returning to Jamaica and going to school, while Daniel attends Hunter College and works in a restaurant. After the four minutes is over, Natasha tells Daniel she loves him.

Five years later, Natasha has returned to New York on her way to San Francisco for graduate school. She meets Jeremy in the same coffee shop where she had been with Daniel and learns Jeremy married the doctor who treated him for the bicycle crash. As Natasha prepares to leave, she hears Daniel's voice. She spins around to see him, and they kiss.

== Cast ==
- Yara Shahidi as Natasha Kingsley
- Hill Harper as Lester Barnes
- Charles Melton as Daniel Jae Ho Bae
- Gbenga Akinnagbe as Samuel Kingsley
- Jake Choi as Charles Bae
- John Leguizamo as Jeremy Martinez
- Anais Lee as Young Natasha Kingsley
- Miriam A. Hyman as Patricia Kingsley
- Jordan Williams as Peter Kingsley
- Keong Sim as Dae Hyun Bae
- Cathy Shim as Min Soo Bae
- Shamika Cotton as Hannah
- Camrus Johnson as Omar Hassabala

== Production ==
Filming began on June 19, 2018. In June, Camrus Johnson was cast to play Omar in the film, and on June 29, 2018, Miriam A. Hyman also joined the cast, as Natasha's mother Mrs. Kingsley, a hard-working Jamaican-born waitress who is resigned to her family's imminent deportation. In July 2018, Cathy Shim was cast to play Min Soo Bae, a Korean immigrant in the film.

Herdis Stefánsdóttir composed the score for the film, while Dustin O'Halloran served as score producer. The soundtrack was released at Sony Classical.

== Reception ==
=== Box office ===
The Sun Is Also a Star grossed $5 million in the United States and Canada, and $1.8 million in other territories, for a worldwide total of $6.8 million, against a production budget of $9 million.

In the United States and Canada, the film was released on May 17, 2019, alongside John Wick: Chapter 3 – Parabellum and A Dog's Journey, and was initially projected to gross $6–12 million from 2,037 theaters in its opening weekend. However, after making $1 million on its first Friday, estimates were lowered to $3 million. It ended up debuting to $2.5 million, one of the worst-ever openings for a film playing in over 2,000 theaters.

=== Critical response ===
On review aggregation website Rotten Tomatoes, the film holds an approval rating of 52% based on 105 reviews, with an average rating of 5.7/10. The website's critical consensus reads: "The Sun Is Also a Star has a pair of easy-to-love leads, but tests the audience's affection with a storyline that strains credulity past the breaking point." On Metacritic, the film has a weighted average score of 52 out of 100, based on 25 critics, indicating "mixed or average reviews". Audiences polled by CinemaScore gave the film an average grade of "B−" on an A+ to F scale, while those at PostTrak gave it 2.5 out of 5 stars.

Amy Nicholson of Variety wrote: "this crowd-pleaser convinces us to spend one day savoring an American Dream."
