= Birgundi Baker =

American actress

- Occupation: Actress
- Years active: 2016–present

Birgundi Baker is an American actress. She is best known for playing Kiesha Williams in the drama series The Chi.

== Early life ==
Baker hails from Raleigh, North Carolina. She attended Howard University, where she majored in dance because she was too scared to major in musical theatre. ...

== Career ==
Early on in her career she made appearances in the drama series Empire and in the sitcom Heathers. Her first big role came playing Anaya in the drama series Black Lightning. Her biggest role so far has been playing Kiesha Williams in the drama series The Chi. She made a guest appearance in the prodecural drama series Station 19.

== Personal life ==
She has two children. She is currently with a non-profit organization called 'Black Missing Foundation' that helps find missing black girls.

== Filmography ==
=== Film ===
| Year | Title | Role | Notes |
|---|---|---|---|
| 2018 | 30 Miles from Nowhere | Delilah | |
| 2019 | Hala | Hannah | |
| 2019 | Loved to Death | Megan | |
| 2019 | Summer of '72 | Carmen | |
| 2020 | The Last Shift | Sydney | |
| 2020 | Circuit | Savannah | Short |
| 2022 | Block Party | Eboni | |
| 2023 | Praise This | Melissa | |
| 2025 | 333 | Mona | Short |

=== Television ===
| Year | Title | Role | Notes |
|---|---|---|---|
| 2016 | Empire | Teen Carol | 4 episodes |
| 2017 | Chicago P.D. | Jess | Episode; I Remember Her Now |
| 2018 | Chicago Med | Kiki | 3 episodes |
| 2018 | Heathers (TV series) | Lizzy | 3 episodes |
| 2019 | Station 19 | Yeni Miller | 2 episodes |
| 2019 | Tales | Ruby Mason | Episode; Moonlight |
| 2019 | College | Maleeska Ashley | 1 episode |
| 2018–2020 | Black Lightning | Anaya | 6 episodes |
| 2020 | While We Breath | Woman | Episode; Three People |
| 2018–2026 | The Chi | Kiesha Williams | |
