= Block Party (2022 film) =

- Directed by: Dawn Wilkinson
- Written by: Matt Allen; Krista Suh
- Produced by: Matt Allen; Lisa Mathis; Gabriel Roth; Krista Suh; Marvin Towns Jr.
- Starring: Antoinette Robertson; Margaret Avery; Golden Brooks; Birgundi Baker; Charlyne Yi; Gary Anthony Williams; Luenell; Bill Cobbs; John Amos
- Cinematography: Michael Marius Pessah
- Edited by: David Abramson
- Music by: Kelly Mac
- Production company: Branch Out Productions
- Distributed by: BET+ Iconic Events Releasing
- Release date: June 8, 2022
- Running time: 90 minutes
- Country: United States
- Language: English

Block Party is a 2022 American comedy film directed by Dawn Wilkinson, starring Antoinette Robertson, Margaret Avery, Golden Brooks, Birgundi Baker, Charlyne Yi, Gary Anthony Williams, Luenell, Bill Cobbs and John Amos.

== Cast ==
- Antoinette Robertson as Keke McQueen
- Margaret Avery as Janice Sommers
- Golden Brooks as Tasha McQueen
- Birgundi Baker as Eboni
- Charlyne Yi as Alice
- Gary Anthony Williams as Sean
- Luenell as Debra
- Bill Cobbs as Uncle Jim
- John Amos as Dennis
- Ben Miliken as Ben
- Terayle Hill as Will Rencher
- Richard Hartley as Daryl
- Faizon Love as Gus
- Felonious Munk as DJ Dee Nutz
- Merle Dandridge as Crystal Maitland
- Carmella Riley as Fire Marshall Joy
- Brad William Henke as Buddy Frank

== Release ==
The film was released in theatres on 8 June 2022 and on BET+ on 16 June.

== Reception ==
Tim Cogshell of KPCC's FilmWeek called the film "so sweet" and praised Cobb's performance and his character, stating that he had "some of the funniest lines" in the film. Monique Jones of Common Sense Media rated the film 3 stars out of 5, calling the film a "lighthearted way to celebrate Juneteenth", and the cast "competent". Katie Walsh of TheWrap called the film a "lightweight comedy that frustrates because there’s the potential for it to be great, to resonate beyond its blandly formulaic charms."
