= The Blackening (film) =

2022 film by Tim Story

- Theatrical release poster
- Directed by: Tim Story
- Written by: Tracy Oliver; Dewayne Perkins
- Based on: The Blackening by 3Peat
- Produced by: Tim Story; Tracy Oliver; E. Brian Dobbins; Marcei A. Brown; Jason Clark; Sharla Sumpter Bridgett
- Starring: Grace Byers; Jermaine Fowler; Melvin Gregg; X Mayo; Dewayne Perkins; Antoinette Robertson; Sinqua Walls; Jay Pharoah; Yvonne Orji
- Cinematography: Todd A. Dos Reis
- Edited by: Peter S. Elliot
- Music by: Dexter Story
- Production companies: MRC; The Story Company; Tracy Yvonne Productions; Artists First; Catchlight Studios
- Distributed by: Lionsgate
- Release dates: September 16, 2022 (TIFF); June 16, 2023 (United States)
- Running time: 97 minutes
- Country: United States
- Language: English
- Budget: $5 million
- Box office: $18.6 million

The Blackening is a 2022 American black horror comedy film directed by Tim Story and written by Tracy Oliver and Dewayne Perkins, based on the 2018 short film of the same name by the comedy troupe 3Peat. It stars Dewayne Perkins, Grace Byers, Jermaine Fowler, Melvin Gregg, X Mayo, Antoinette Robertson, Sinqua Walls, Jay Pharoah, and Yvonne Orji. The film, set on Juneteenth, follows a group of black friends targeted by a masked killer while staying at a cabin in the woods.

The Blackening premiered at the Toronto International Film Festival on September 16, 2022, and was theatrically released on June 16, 2023, by Lionsgate in the United States and on August 23, 2023 by Universal Pictures in the United Kingdom. The film grossed $18 million and received generally positive reviews, with critics noting the satire of horror film tropes and ethnic stereotypes.

== Plot ==
Morgan and Shawn arrive to a cabin in the woods where they plan on celebrating Juneteenth with their group of friends. In the game room, the couple discovers a board game called "The Blackening", which features a racist Little Black Sambo caricature. The game demands they play and asks a question about black characters in horror movies. Shawn answers but Morgan says he's got it wrong. The lights go out, Morgan finds her phone light in time to see Shawn die with an arrow in his neck.

The next day, Lisa, Allison and Dewayne and Shanika and Nnmandi arrive. Clifton joins them later, although the group wonder how Clifton knew about the gathering. Later, he says Morgan sent him an evite. Clifton shows some signs of cerebral palsy or stroke and wears glasses.

Drinks, drugs, and games ensue. After the lights go out again, the friends go to find a power box, only to come across The Blackening with game pieces correlating to their personalities. The voice speaks to them and shows them on an old TV that he is keeping Morgan prisoner.

The voice forces the friends to play the game to save Morgan, and begins by asking trivia questions about African-American culture. Unfortunately, the friends fail to sufficiently answer a question about all the black actors that guest-starred on Friends and Morgan is attacked. She escapes from her chair and runs up the stairs to the door that the friends are stood by. King produces a gun and shoots the lock off the door but Morgan has vanished. The assailant is there and Shannika tried to shove the door closed. The assailant pushes his foot in the gap and Shannika yells for a knife and stabs him in the foot so he withdraws.

Next they are ordered to sacrifice one of their own based on whom they deem to be "the blackest"; the most black person will be sacrificed. Each of them comes up with their own defense of why it cannot be them, and after Clifton admits he voted for Donald Trump in both elections. Despite this seemingly white behaviour, everyone chooses Clifton because they are angry with him.

Clifton goes outside and is shot in the chest with an arrow by the killer which is shown to the friends on the TV. When the friends are freed from the room, they disagree on whether to defend themselves in the house or chance running into the woods. Despite knowing better, they agree to split up.

Allison goes off with King and Shanika, while Dewayne goes with Lisa and Nnamdi. The latter three end up running into Ranger White, who is willing to help them and gets them to lock themselves in his car. Later the killer shoots him in the neck with an arrow.

Shanika swims across the lake but the assailant shoots arrows at her. King jumps from a tree onto him and disarms him. With Allison, the trio manage to overpower and kill him. They unmask him to find that it's the clerk that Shanika saw at the gas station, but she realises from his unmarked shoes that there must be more than one killer ( earlier she had stabbed him in the foot).

Lisa, Nnamdi, and Dewayne then encounter a second killer before Lisa bashes his brains in. They look through his pockets to see that he is the first killer's twin brother, and they deduce someone hired them to be there.

The friends go into another room, where they find Ranger White's and Clifton's bodies, only for the latter to spring awake and reveal himself as the mastermind. He blames the group for always doubting his level of "blackness" when they knew each other at college, with this doubt leading to an incident where he drank heavily and ended up killing a woman when driving on the road.

After serving four years in prison for the DUI, he organized the entire night as revenge and prepares to kill the others before dropping them down a well where he dumped Shawn's and Morgan's corpses. The friends fight back before kicking him down the well to his apparent death. Clifton's laugh can be heard as they leave.

As the morning arrives, the friends are skeptical of calling the police for help. On the advice of Dewayne, they call the fire department instead, only for them to be sprayed with a hose.

== Cast ==
- Grace Byers as Allison
- Jermaine Fowler as Clifton
- Melvin Gregg as King
- X Mayo as Shanika
- Dewayne Perkins as Dewayne
- Antoinette Robertson as Lisa
- Sinqua Walls as Nnamdi
- Jay Pharoah as Shawn
- Yvonne Orji as Morgan
- Diedrich Bader as Ranger White
- James Preston Rogers as Clive Connor and Camden Connor

== Production ==
The film was announced in January 2020, with Tracy Oliver and Dewayne Perkins writing the script, based on Perkins' 2018 short. Tim Story was later hired to direct, and filming took place in Brentwood, California in late 2021. Much of the film's dialogue was improvised by the cast.

== Release ==
The Blackening premiered at the 2022 Toronto International Film Festival on September 16, 2022, and shortly afterwards Lionsgate acquired the distribution rights for "just short of" $20 million. The film was released theatrically in the United States on June 16, 2023, the weekend of Juneteenth. In the United Kingdom, the film was released on August 25, 2023 by Universal Pictures.

Zahara Ariel and Jaryah Bobo claimed the movie infringed on their screenplay Southern Education and card game "Black Card Revoked" and attempted to get the film's release delayed. On the day of the film's release, Erik Pedersen of Deadline Hollywood reported that California judge Dale S. Fischer rejected Ariel and Bobo's bid, saying, "Plaintiffs present little to no detail regarding either the game or the screenplay, and there is no reason to believe that the expression of ideas in either has been copied in the making of the film."

=== Home media ===
The Blackening was released on digital download on July 7, 2023, and was released on Ultra HD Blu-ray, Blu-ray and DVD on August 22, 2023.

== Reception ==
=== Box office ===
In the United States and Canada, The Blackening was released alongside Elemental and The Flash, and was projected to gross $7–8 million from 1,775 theaters in its opening weekend. The film made $2.5 million on its first day, including $900,000 from Thursday night previews. The film went to debut on $6 million in its opening weekend (an average of $3,380), finishing sixth at the box office. The film made $3 million in its second weekend, finishing seventh.

=== Critical response ===
On the review aggregator website Rotten Tomatoes, 87% of 146 critics' reviews are positive, with an average rating of 7/10. The website's consensus reads: "While it could stand to be a little funnier and quite a bit scarier, The Blackening is a thoughtful satire that skewers horror tropes and racial stereotypes." Metacritic, which uses a weighted average, assigned the film a score of 67 out of 100, based on 34 critics, indicating "generally favorable" reviews. Audiences polled by CinemaScore gave the film an average grade of "B+" on an A+ to F scale, while PostTrak reported 81% of filmgoers gave it a positive score, with 64% saying they would definitely recommend the film.

Joe Lipsett of Bloody Disgusting rated the film four out of five, writing that "[w]hile the kills in The Blackening are decent and the killer's choice of weapon (a crossbow) is novel, it's the comedy and camaraderie between the friends that make the film stand out. Not only do these characters fight and support each other as real friends do, but Perkins and Oliver's script is also filled to the brim with smart, savvy jokes. The film is legitimately hilarious, tackling everything from obvious stereotypes to ingrained cultural prejudice within the group."

For IndieWire, Rafael Motamayor gave the film a grade of "B", calling it "the first great horror parody of the post-Get Out era" and writing that "every slasher movie needs a good villain and here the killer wears a blackface leather mask. It's on the nose, but this parody has about as much subtext as Scary Movie and that's part of the fun. There is no toning down Blackness or explaining things to White audiences. If you don't know how to play Spades or what the Black anthem is, ask a friend."

== Potential sequel ==
In November 2023, Variety reported that MRC and Lionsgate were in talks with writers Dewayne Perkins, Tracy Oliver and producer E. Brian Dobbins to return for a sequel. Perkins had previously expressed to the magazine that he envisioned a franchise akin to a "Scary Movie-esque series versus the Knives Out style with a new cast for each mystery".

== See also ==
- Race in horror films
