= Richard Jenkins =

American actor (born 1947)

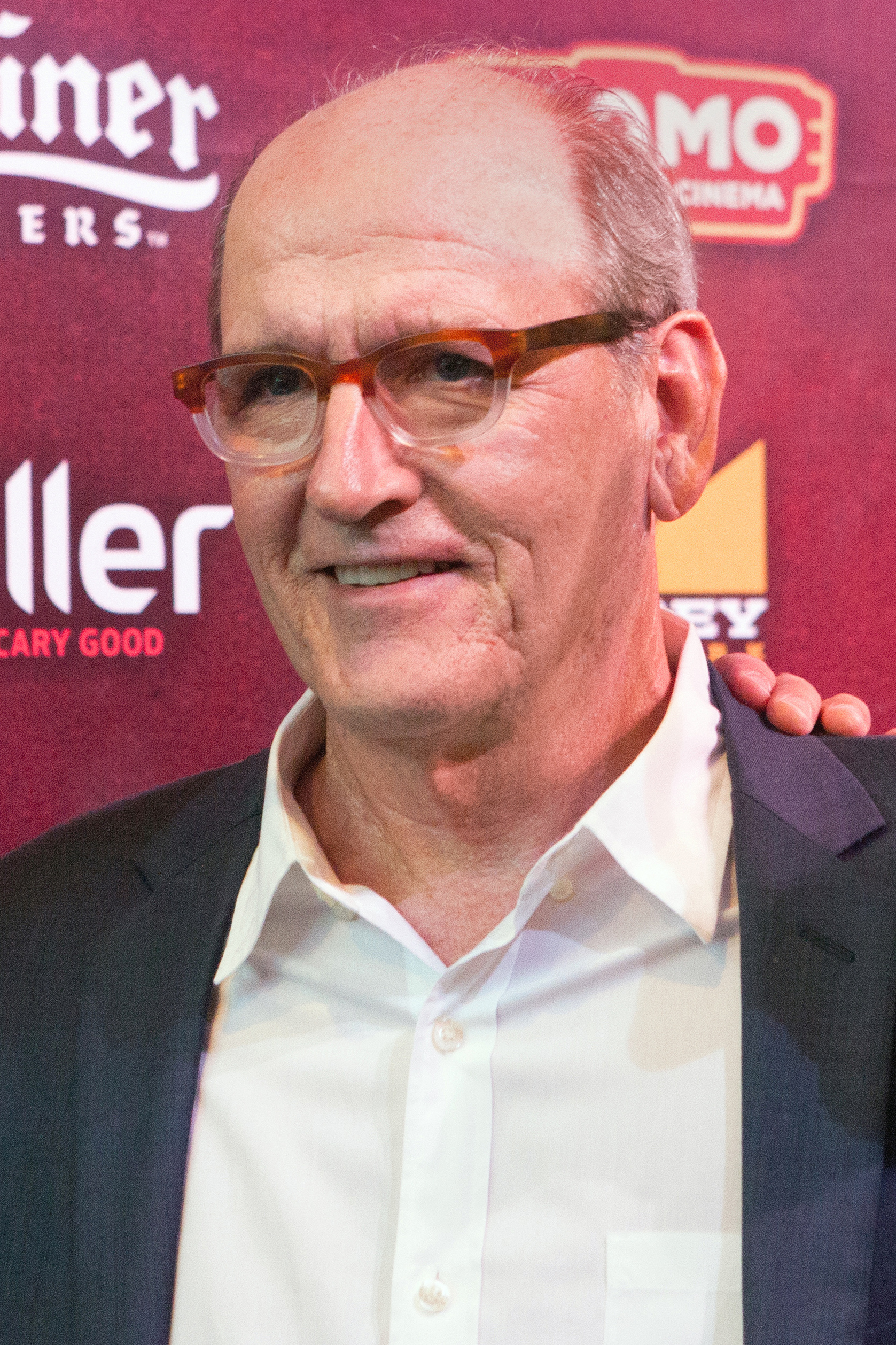
- Jenkins in 2015
- Born: Richard Dale Jenkins; May 4, 1947 (age 79); DeKalb, Illinois, U.S.
- Education: Illinois Wesleyan University
- Occupation: Actor
- Years active: 1974–present
- Spouse: Sharon R. Friedrick (m. 1969)
- Children: 2

Richard Dale Jenkins (born May 4, 1947) is an American actor. He began his career in theater at the Trinity Repertory Company and made his film debut in 1974. He has worked steadily in film and television since the 1980s, mostly in supporting roles.

His body of work includes such films as The Witches of Eastwick (1987), Little Nikita (1988), Flirting with Disaster (1996), Snow Falling on Cedars (1999), The Mudge Boy (2003), Cheaper By The Dozen (2003), Burn After Reading (2008), Step Brothers (2008), Let Me In (2010), Jack Reacher (2012), The Cabin in the Woods (2012), White House Down (2013), Bone Tomahawk (2015), The Last Shift (2020), The Humans (2021), and Nightmare Alley (2021). On television, he played Nathaniel Fisher in the HBO drama series Six Feet Under (2001–2005).

Jenkins received nominations for the Academy Award, Spirit Award, and Screen Actors Guild Award for Best Actor for the drama film The Visitor (2007). He won the Primetime Emmy Award for Outstanding Lead Actor in a Miniseries or a Movie for the limited drama series Olive Kitteridge (2014). For his performance in the fantasy drama film The Shape of Water (2017), he was nominated for the Academy Award, Golden Globe, and Screen Actors Guild Award for Best Supporting Actor. The Netflix miniseries Dahmer – Monster: The Jeffrey Dahmer Story (2022) garnered him both Golden Globe and Emmy nominations for Best Supporting Actor, and an additional Emmy nomination for producing the series.

== Early life and education ==
Jenkins was born and raised in DeKalb, Illinois. His mother, Mary Elizabeth (née Wheeler), was a housewife, and his father, Dale Stevens Jenkins, was a dentist. He attended DeKalb High School. Before he became a professional actor, Jenkins drove a linen truck; his boss was the father of actor John C. Reilly. He earned a degree in drama from Illinois Wesleyan University before relocating to Rhode Island.

== Career ==
=== Theatre ===
Jenkins worked with the Trinity Repertory Company in Providence, Rhode Island, while breaking into film with a bit part in Feasting with Panthers (1974), a television film about Oscar Wilde. When he was given the option of joining the Screen Actors Guild, he accepted immediately. He continued as a member of Trinity's resident acting company and served as its artistic director from 1990 to 1994.

=== Film ===
Since his debut in the television movie Feasting with Panthers (1974), Jenkins has worked steadily in film. His earlier film credits include Silverado (1985), Hannah and Her Sisters (1986), The Witches of Eastwick (1987), Sea of Love (1989), Blue Steel (1990), How to Make an American Quilt (1995), Flirting with Disaster (1996), and Snow Falling On Cedars (1999).

He has worked with the director siblings the Farrelly brothers in There's Something About Mary (1998), Outside Providence (1999), Me, Myself & Irene (2000), Say It Isn't So (2001) and Hall Pass (2011). He has also appeared in three Coen Brothers movies: The Man Who Wasn't There (2001), Intolerable Cruelty (2003), and Burn After Reading (2008). He is in North Country (2005), has three memorable scenes as FBI Director James (Robert) Grace in The Kingdom (2007), and Dr. Robert Dobeck in Step Brothers (2008).

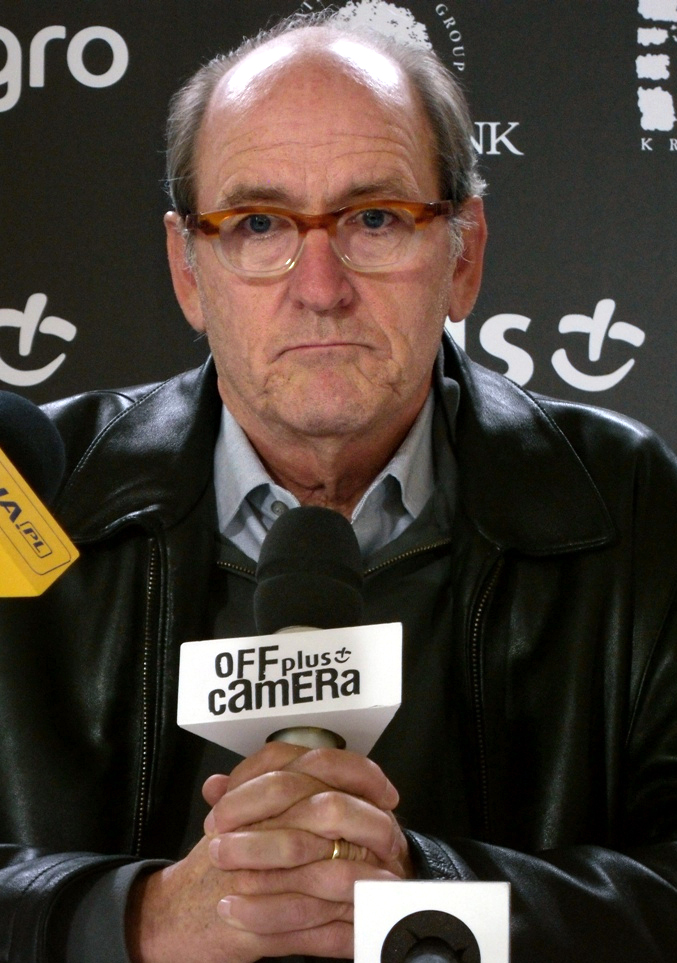
Jenkins in April 2011

Although primarily known for supporting parts, Jenkins had a lead role in The Visitor (2007) for which he was nominated for the Independent Spirit Award and an Academy Award for Best Actor. Jenkins won the International Press Academy's Satellite Award for Best Actor – Motion Picture.

In 2010, Jenkins costarred in Dear John, as the father of John Tyree (Channing Tatum), and also co-starred with Julia Roberts and Javier Bardem in Eat Pray Love. In 2012, he appeared in the Joss Whedon and Drew Goddard horror film The Cabin in the Woods and the action film Jack Reacher. He then appeared in the action films White House Down (2013) and Kong: Skull Island (2017).

Jenkins co-starred in Guillermo del Toro's fantasy romance drama film The Shape of Water (2017), for which he received critical acclaim. For his performance, he garnered Academy Award, Golden Globe and Screen Actors Guild Award nominations for Best Supporting Actor.

=== Television ===
Jenkins played Nathaniel Fisher in the HBO drama series Six Feet Under. His character is the deceased patriarch of the Fisher family and regularly appears to his family as a ghost or in dreams. He played the role for the show's entire run. He and his castmates received a Screen Actors Guild Award for Outstanding Performance by an Ensemble in a Drama Series in 2002.

Jenkins portrayed a DEA agent in one episode of Miami Vice and a mob boss in a later episode.

In 2015, Jenkins won the Primetime Emmy Award for Outstanding Lead Actor in a Miniseries or Movie for his performance as Henry Kitteridge in the HBO miniseries Olive Kitteridge.

In 2022, Jenkins portrayed Lionel Dahmer, father of notorious serial killer Jeffrey Dahmer, in Netflix's limited series Dahmer – Monster: The Jeffrey Dahmer Story. Starring alongside Evan Peters and Molly Ringwald, Jenkins appears in all ten episodes of the series created by Ryan Murphy. His performance was described in The New Yorker as "brilliant," and he was nominated for the 2023 Primetime Emmy for Outstanding Supporting Actor In A Limited Or Anthology Series Or Movie.

== Personal life ==
Jenkins is married to choreographer Sharon R. Friedrick, with whom he has two children.

== Acting credits ==
=== Film ===
Year	Title	Role	Director	Notes
1985	Silverado	Kelly	Lawrence Kasdan	
1986	Hannah and Her Sisters	Dr. Wilkes	Woody Allen	
1986	The Manhattan Project	Radiation Controls Officer, Medatomics Lab	Marshall Brickman	
1986	On Valentine's Day	Bobby Pate	Ken Harrison	
1987	Rachel River	Cordell	Sandy Smolan	
1987	The Witches of Eastwick	Clyde Alden	George Miller	
1987	Courtship	Bobby Pate	Howard Cummings	
1988	Little Nikita	Richard Grant	Richard Benjamin	
1988	Stealing Home	Hank Chandler	Steven Kampmann & William Porter	
1989	Sea of Love	Detective Gruber	Harold Becker	
1989	Blaze	Picayune	Ron Shelton	
1989	How I Got into College	Bill Browne	Savage Steve Holland	
1990	Blue Steel	Attorney Mel Dawson	Kathryn Bigelow	
1993	Undercover Blues	Frank	Herbert Ross	
1994	It Could Happen to You	C. Vernon Hale	Andrew Bergman	
1994	Trapped in Paradise	Agent Shaddus Peyser	George Gallo	
1994	Wolf	Detective Bridger	Mike Nichols	
1995	How to Make an American Quilt	Howell Saunders	Jocelyn Moorhouse	
1995	The Indian in the Cupboard	Victor	Frank Oz	
1996	Flirting with Disaster	Paul Harmon	David O. Russell	
1996	A Couch in New York	Campton	Chantal Akerman	
1996	Eddie	Carl Zimmer	Steve Rash	
1997	Eye of God	Willard Sprague	Tim Blake Nelson	
1997	Absolute Power	Michael McCarty	Clint Eastwood	
1998	There's Something About Mary	Psychiatrist	Peter & Bobby Farrelly	Uncredited cameo
1998	The Impostors	Johnny Leguard	Stanley Tucci	
1999	Random Hearts	Truman Trainor	Sydney Pollack	
1999	Snow Falling on Cedars	Sheriff Art Moran	Scott Hicks	
1999	The Mod Squad	Det. Bob Mothershed	Scott Silver	
1999	Outside Providence	Barney	Michael Corrente	
1999	The Confession	Cass O'Donnell	David Hugh Jones	
2000	What Planet Are You From?	Don Fisk	Mike Nichols	
2000	Me, Myself & Irene	Agent Boshane	Peter & Bobby Farrelly	
2001	Say It Isn't So	Walter Wingfield	J.B. Rogers	
2001	The Man Who Wasn't There	Walter Abundas	Joel & Ethan Coen	
2001	One Night at McCool's	Father Jimmy	Harald Zwart	
2002	Stealing Harvard	Honorable Emmett Cook	Bruce McCulloch	
2002	Changing Lanes	Walter Arnell	Roger Michell	
2003	Cheaper by the Dozen	Shake McGuire	Shawn Levy	
2003	Intolerable Cruelty	Freddy Bender	Joel & Ethan Coen	
2003	The Core	General Thomas Purcell	Jon Amiel	
2003	The Mudge Boy	Edgar Mudge	Michael Burke	
2004	Shall We Dance?	Devine	Peter Chelsom	
2004	I Heart Huckabees	Mr. Hooten	David O. Russell	Uncredited cameo
2005	Fun with Dick and Jane	Frank Bascombe	Dean Parisot	
2005	Rumor Has It…	Earl Huttinger	Rob Reiner	
2005	North Country	Hank Aimes	Niki Caro	
2007	The Kingdom	FBI Director Robert Grace	Peter Berg	
2008	The Visitor	Professor Walter Vale	Tom McCarthy	
2008	The Broken	John McVey	Sean Ellis	
2008	Step Brothers	Dr. Robert Doback	Adam McKay	
2008	Burn After Reading	Ted Treffon	Joel & Ethan Coen	
2008	The Tale of Despereaux	Principal	Sam Fell & Robert Stevenhagen	Voice
2009	Waiting for Forever	Richard Twist	James Keach	
2010	happythankyoumoreplease	Paul Gertmanian	Josh Radnor	
2010	Dear John	Bill Tyree	Lasse Hallström	
2010	Eat Pray Love	Richard Fenwick	Ryan Murphy	
2010	Norman	Doug Long	Jonathan Segal	
2010	Let Me In	The Father	Matt Reeves	
2011	Friends with Benefits	Mr. Harper	Will Gluck	
2011	The Rum Diary	Edward J. Lotterman	Bruce Robinson	
2011	Hall Pass	Coakley	Peter & Bobby Farrelly	
2012	Liberal Arts	Professor Peter Hoberg	Josh Radnor	
2012	Darling Companion	Russell	Lawrence Kasdan	
2012	The Cabin in the Woods	Gary Sitterson	Drew Goddard	
2012	Killing Them Softly	Ron Fenwick, The Driver	Andrew Dominik	
2012	Jack Reacher	District Attorney Alex Rodin	Christopher McQuarrie	
2012	The Company You Keep	Jed Lewis	Robert Redford	
2013	White House Down	Speaker Eli Raphelson	Roland Emmerich	
2013	Turbo	Bobby	David Soren	Voice
2013	A.C.O.D.	Hugh	Stu Zicherman	
2014	God's Pocket	Richard Shelburn	John Slattery	
2014	4 Minute Mile	Coach Coleman	Charles-Olivier Michaud	
2014	Lullaby	Robert	Andrew Levitas	
2015	Bone Tomahawk	Deputy Chicory	S. Craig Zahler	
2015	Spotlight	Richard Sipe	Tom McCarthy	Uncredited voice cameo
2016	The Hollars	Don Hollar	John Krasinski	
2016	LBJ	Senator Richard Russell Jr.	Rob Reiner	
2017	Kong: Skull Island	Senator Al Willis	Jordan Vogt-Roberts	
2017	The Shape of Water	Giles	Guillermo del Toro	
2020	Kajillionaire	Robert Shepard	Miranda July	
2020	The Last Shift	Stanley	Andrew Cohn	
2021	The Humans	Erik Blake	Stephen Karam	
2021	Nightmare Alley	Ezra Grindle	Guillermo del Toro	
2024	IF	Art Teacher	John Krasinski	Voice

=== Television ===
Year	Title	Role	Notes
1974–1975	Great Performances	Warder / The Sheriff	2 episodes
1984	American Playhouse	Nicholas Vazzana	Episode: "Concealed Enemies, Part I: Suspicion"
1985	Spenser: For Hire	'Tex'	Episode: "Internal Affairs"
1985–1989	Miami Vice	Goodman / DEA Agent Ed Waters	2 episodes
1986	The Little Sister	Roger Davis	Television film
1988	In the Line of Duty: The F.B.I. Murders	Detective Hamill	Television film
1989	Out on the Edge	Paul Evetts	Television film
1989	Kojak: Fatal Flaw	Joel Litkin	Television film
1990	Challenger	Gregory Jarvis	Television film
1990	Rising Son	Tommy	Television film
1990	When You Remember Me	Vaughan	
1990	Against the Law	Wexford	3 episodes
1990	Descending Angel	Debaudt	Television film
1991	Doublecrossed	Jim Donaldson	Television film
1992	Afterburn	Acton Ryder	Television film
1992	Crossroads	Jim Mundy	Episode: "Pilot"
1993	Alex Haley's Queen	Mr. Benson	2 episodes
1993	And the Band Played On	Dr. Marc Conant	Television film
1996	The Boys Next Door	Bob Klemper	Television film
1997	Into Thin Air: Death on Everest	Beck Weathers	Television film
2001	Ally McBeal	Mr. Bo	Episode: "Mr. Bo"
2001–2005	Six Feet Under	Nathaniel Fisher	21 episodes
2002	Sins of the Father	Bobby Frank Cherry	Television film
2014	Olive Kitteridge	Henry Kitteridge	Main role; Limited Series
2016–2019	Berlin Station	Steven Frost	24 episodes
2017	Comrade Detective	Vlad Anghel (voice)	Episode: "No Exit"
2022	Dahmer – Monster: The Jeffrey Dahmer Story	Lionel Dahmer	Main role and producer; Limited Series
2026	DTF St. Louis	Donoghue Homer	Limited Series
TBA	Criminal	Ivan	Main role; Limited Series

== Awards and honors ==
In 2014, Jenkins and his wife Sharon received the Pell Award for Lifetime Achievement from Trinity Repertory Company in Providence.
