= The Sun Is Also a Star (novel) =

2016 young adult novel by Nicola Yoon

- Author: Nicola Yoon
- Audio read by: Bahni Turpin
- Language: English
- Subject: Illegal immigration, Deportation
- Genre: Young adult fiction
- Set in: New York City
- Published: 2016
- Publisher: Delacorte Books
- Publication date: November 1, 2016
- Publication place: United States
- Media type: Print (hardback, paperback), e-book, audiobook
- Pages: 384
- ISBN: 9780553496680

The Sun Is Also a Star is a young adult novel by American author Nicola Yoon, published November 1, 2016, by Delacorte Press. The book follows two characters, one of whom is about to be deported, and explores “the ways in which we are all connected and the ways in which people across all walks of life have much more in common than they think they do.”

The book is a #1 New York Times best seller and won Yoon the John Steptoe New Talent Award.

In 2019, Warner Brothers adapted The Sun Is Also a Star into a film.

== Plot ==
The Sun Is Also a Star follows two teenagers in New York City, Natasha Kingsley and Daniel Bae. Natasha is an illegal immigrant from Jamaica living in Brooklyn who learns that her family will be deported. Daniel is the son of Korean immigrants living in Harlem. Daniel is a poet resisting his parents' dream of him becoming a doctor, and Natasha is science-minded.

Natasha seeks help from an immigration lawyer, who tells her he has an appointment later in the day, then visits a record store, where she meets Daniel, who is in the city before a college admissions interview. The two teenagers spend the next several hours together, during which time they frequently discuss love and destiny, concepts they have differing opinions on.

When the time arrives, they head to their respective appointments, where they learn both of them were slotted to meet the same person.

== Reception ==
The Sun Is Also A Star is a #1 New York Times best seller. Both the book and audiobook are Junior Library Guild selections.

The book received starred reviews from Booklist, The Horn Book, Kirkus, Publishers Weekly, School Library Journal, and Shelf Awareness, as well as a positive review from The Bulletin of the Center for Children’s Books.

Publishers Weekly called the book "[a] moving and suspenseful portrayal of a fleeting relationship." Writing for Shelf Awareness, Karin Snelson wrote, "The Sun Is Also a Star--an exhilarating, hopeful novel exploring identity, family, the love of science and the science of love, dark matter and interconnectedness--is about seeing and being seen and the possibility of love... and it shines."

The audiobook, narrated by Bahni Turpin (Natasha), Raymond Lee (Daniel), and Dominic Hoffman (narrator), received a starred review from School Library Journal, who noted, "The narrators do a stellar job of conveying the characters' individual and interwoven journeys." Booklist provided a positive review, calling it "[a] rewarding adaptation of a memorable novel."

The Bulletin of the Center for Children's Books, BuzzFeed, the Chicago Public Library, Kirkus, the Los Angeles Public Library, the New York Public Library, Publishers Weekly named The Sun Is Also a Star one of the best young adult novels of 2016. The Center for the Study of Multicultural Children's Literature included it in their list of the best multicultural books of the year.

Awards and honors for The Sun Is Also A Star
| Year | Award/Honor | Result | Ref. |
|---|---|---|---|
| 2016 | Booklist's Best Romance Fiction for Youth | Top 10 | |
| 2016 | Booklist Editors' Choice: Books for Youth | Selection | |
| 2016 | Goodreads Choice Award for Young Adult Fiction | Nominee | |
| 2016 | National Book Award for Young People's Literature | Finalist | |
| 2016 | The New York Times Notable Children's Books | Selection | |
| 2017 | Amelia Elizabeth Walden Award | Finalist | |
| 2017 | Indies Choice Book Awards' Young Adult Book of the Year | Honor | |
| 2017 | John Steptoe New Talent Award for Author | Winner | |
| 2017 | Michael L. Printz Award | Honor | |
| 2017 | Walter Dean Myers Award | Honor | |
| 2017 | YALSA Best Fiction for Young Adults | Top 10 | |
| 2018 | ALA Teen's Top Ten | Top 10 | |
| 2018 | YALSA Amazing Audiobooks for Young Adults | Selection | |

== Film adaptation ==
In 2019, Warner Brothers adapted The Sun Is Also a Star into a film directed by Ry Russo-Young and written by Tracy Oliver. The film starred Yara Shahidi and Charles Melton. The author, "contributed ideas, script notes, and general input on the film."

After the film's trailer was released in February 2019, three months before the film's release, book sales increased 50 percent.
