= Michelle Wolf =

American comedian (born 1985)

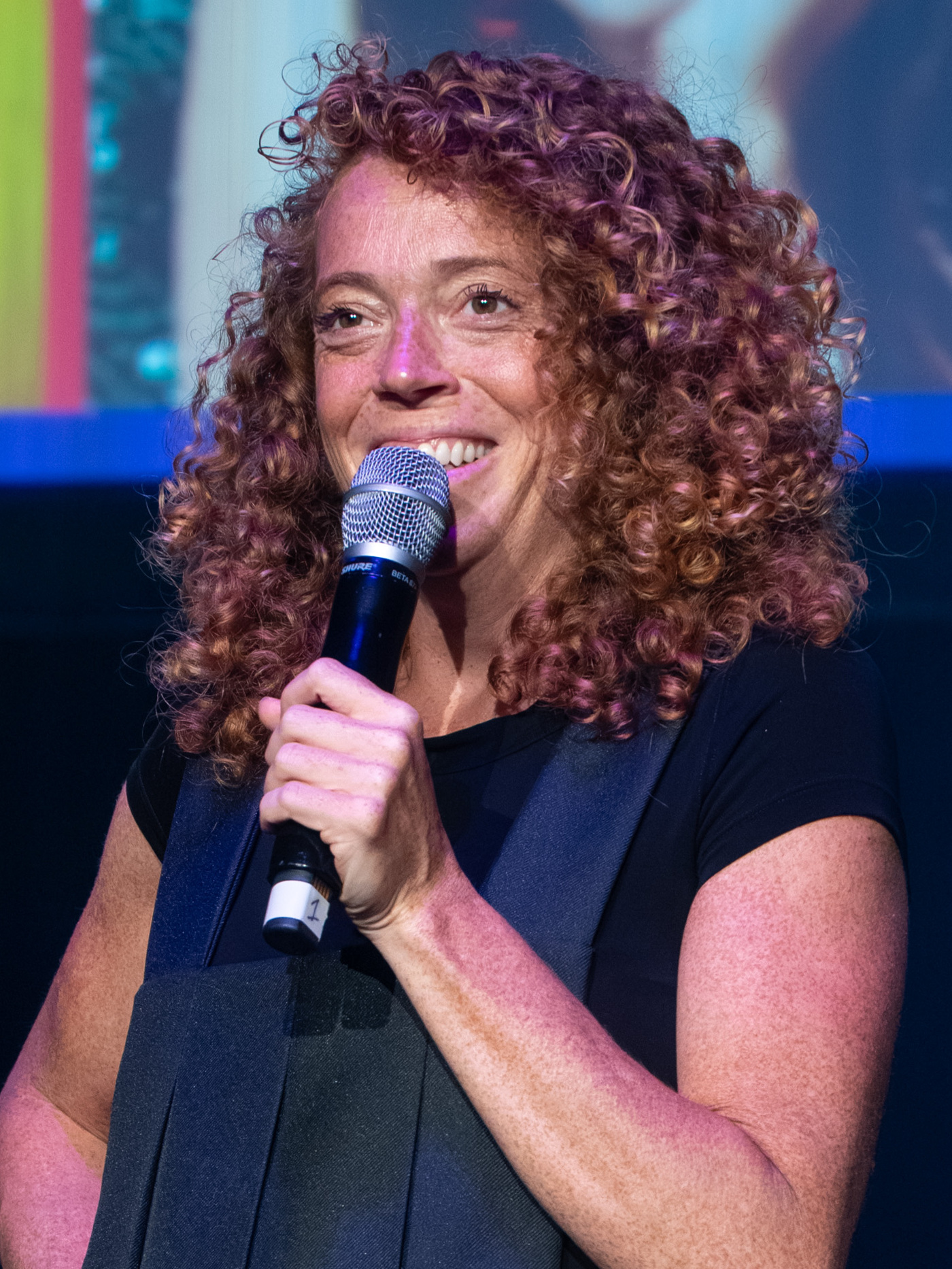
- Wolf at the 2025 Edinburgh Festival Fringe
- Born: June 21, 1985 (age 41); Hershey, Pennsylvania, U.S.
- Education: College of William & Mary (BS)
- Children: 2

Comedy career
- Years active: 2014–present
- Medium: Stand-up; television
- Genres: Political/news satire; observational comedy; black comedy; insult comedy; deadpan; surreal humor
- Subjects: American politics; American culture; abortion; political punditry; popular culture; current events; mass media/news media; civil rights; feminism
- Website: michelleisawolf.com

Michelle Wolf (born June 21, 1985) is an American comedian, writer, producer, and television host. She worked as a contributor and writer for Late Night with Seth Meyers and The Daily Show with Trevor Noah. She spoke as the featured performer at the 2018 White House Correspondents' Dinner. She hosted the Netflix comedy talk show series The Break with Michelle Wolf and performed in the 2019 stand-up comedy special Joke Show.

== Early life and education ==
Wolf was born in Hershey, Pennsylvania, where she grew up with two older brothers. She graduated from Hershey High School in 2003. She graduated from the College of William & Mary in 2007, where she majored in kinesiology and was a member of the cardiovascular physiology lab. She was on the track and field team while in high school and college, competing in the high jump and 400 meter and 800 meter runs before an injury forced her to stop competing.

== Career ==
Wolf was employed at Bear Stearns from 2007 to 2008, later at JPMorgan Chase, working for almost four years in mutual funds and managing accounts between the two banks. Around the time of the buyout by JPMorgan, Wolf started improv classes at the Upright Citizens Brigade and the Peoples Improv Theater (PIT). Her frustration with the imperfect and ephemeral nature of improv and the encouragement from classmates got her to audit a stand-up class at the People's Improvisational Theater aka The PIT. Her first appearance on late-night television was in July 2014, when she went on Late Night with Seth Meyers. She re-appeared on numerous segments on Late Night, often as her fictional persona, "Grown-Up Annie", an adult version of Little Orphan Annie. She later held additional positions on the same show, including, most recently, as writing supervisor.

In November 2015, Comedy Central released the entirety of Now Hiring, a web series hosted by Wolf, on YouTube. Wolf is a regular at the Comedy Cellar in New York City. In April 2016, she joined The Daily Show with Trevor Noah as a contributor. Wolf has said that she learned a lot about comedy working for Seth Meyers and Trevor Noah.

In August 2016, she performed her stand-up show So Brave at the Edinburgh Festival, which was her first performance outside North America.

Wolf's television work in the United Kingdom also includes an appearance on Live At The Apollo in late 2016 and an appearance as a panelist on the UK comedy game show 8 Out of 10 Cats Does Countdown in early 2017, partnering with team captain and British stand-up comedian Jon Richardson. She appeared on the same show later on in the year, this time partnering with Sean Lock. On November 20, 2016, Wolf appeared as a guest on Frankie Boyle's American Autopsy on BBC2, reflecting on the result of the 2016 United States presidential election. She also appeared on an episode of 8 Out of 10 Cats in January 2017, partnering with English footballer Jermaine Jenas and team captain Rob Beckett, and partnered with David Mitchell on The Big Fat Quiz of the Year 2018.

On December 2, 2017, Wolf made her HBO stand-up debut, Michelle Wolf: Nice Lady, which was taped at the Skirball Center for the Performing Arts in New York City in mid-August 2017.

=== 2018 White House Correspondents' Dinner controversy ===
External videos
- 2018 White House Correspondents' Dinner, April 28, 2018, C-SPAN

On April 28, 2018, Wolf was the featured entertainer at the annual White House Correspondents' Dinner. U.S. President Donald Trump chose not to attend the dinner, for the second consecutive year, instead sending White House Press Secretary Sarah Huckabee Sanders.

Wolf delivered a 19-minute stand-up comedy roast, receiving both praise and criticism for her "harsh and stinging" jokes targeting the Trump administration, in particular Sarah Sanders, as well as the U.S. news media. Her criticism of journalists was deemed by one commentator "the most consequential monologue so far of the Donald Trump era." However, managers at C-SPAN Radio considered the monologue so risqué that they stopped broadcasting it half-way through, worried that she might violate broadcasting "indecency" guidelines and that the company might be subject to fines by the FCC.

Wolf's joke about Sanders' using "the ashes" of "burn[ed] facts" to create her perfect eye makeup became the most controversial issue among the criticisms aimed at Wolf's presentation:

"I actually really like Sarah. I think she's very resourceful. She burns facts, and then she uses that ash to create a perfect smoky eye. Like maybe she's born with it, maybe it's lies. It's probably lies."

Journalists including Maggie Haberman, Mika Brzezinski, Andrea Mitchell, and Ed Henry criticized the joke, which they interpreted as mocking Sanders' appearance, and CBS News executives briefly considered ending its participation in future dinners. Former press secretary Sean Spicer tweeted, "Tonight's ~~#~~WHCD was a disgrace" to which Wolf replied, "Thank you!" The next day, Trump took to Twitter and called several outside advisors to criticize the comedian. Other journalists, including Jacob Soboroff, Joan Walsh, Amanda Hess, and Wesley Lowery tweeted their support for Wolf and took the White House Correspondents' Association (WHCA) to task for the statement issued by its president, Margaret Talev that the "monologue was not in the spirit of [the WHCA] mission." James Poniewozik, writing for The New York Times, criticized the WHCA for disavowing Wolf, saying that she was "defending the mission of the White House press: sticking up for the truth. Michelle Wolf had the WHCA's back Saturday night, even if it didn't have hers the day after." The New Yorker's Masha Gessen was particularly impressed with Wolf's criticism of journalism, praising her for how she "exposed the obscenity of the fictions" of "The Age of Trump". Many comedians came to Wolf's defense, including Jimmy Kimmel, Trevor Noah, Seth Meyers, Adam Conover, Dave Chappelle, Kathy Griffin, Guy Branum, Anthony Atamanuik and Jimmy Dore. Stephen Colbert, who was the featured entertainer at the event in 2006, joked on The Late Show, "This is the correspondents' dinner, celebrating the freedom of speech. You can't just say whatever you want!"

Wolf questioned her critics from the media: "Why are you guys making this about Sarah's looks? I said she burns facts and uses the ash to create a *perfect* smoky eye. I complimented her eye makeup and her ingenuity of materials." In an interview with Terry Gross on NPR, Wolf said that the joke was not about Sanders' looks at all, it was about her lies, and there is not really a need to defend it in the first place. Although she made jokes mocking the physical appearance of various male politicians, such as Mitch McConnell's neck or Chris Christie's weight, Wolf said she had made a conscious effort to not write any jokes about the physical appearance of any women, and that "as a woman, I have access to hit women in a way that men might not be able to hit them with jokes. I don't mean physically hit. But you know, because I'm a woman, I can say things about women, because I know what it's like to be a woman". Talking about her performance, "I wouldn't change a single word that I said. I'm very happy with what I said, and I'm glad I stuck to my guns." Wolf was later grateful for the controversy, which helped sell out tickets for her March 2018 stand-up show at Carolines on Broadway.

=== The Break with Michelle Wolf ===
Wolf hosted a weekly Netflix talk show, The Break with Michelle Wolf, which premiered May 27, 2018, and was discontinued on August 18, 2018. Before the show premiered, it was announced that it would "take a break from the seriousness of late-night comedy" and "instead of making the news fun, she'll make fun of everything and everybody. There will be no preaching or political agenda—unless it's funny." She was also an executive producer for the show. Netflix released the trailer to coincide with her appearance at 2018 White House Correspondents' Dinner. Netflix ordered a 10-episode season that premiered in May 2018 and aired over 10 weeks, with the series finale on July 29, 2018. The show was cancelled after one season, having not drawn enough of a viewership to secure a renewal.

=== Joke Show ===
In December 2019, Netflix released Joke Show, a stand-up comedy special written and performed by Wolf.

=== Bill Burr Presents: Friends Who Kill ===
Michelle Wolf was featured on Netflix's Bill Burr Presents: Friends Who Kill in 2022.

=== It's Great to Be Here ===
In September 2023 Wolf released a new comedy mini series, It's Great to Be Here.

=== The Daily Show guest hosting ===
Wolf guest hosted The Daily Show the week of November 27, 2023.

== Personal life ==
Wolf is an avid runner, and took part in a marathon in 2005 (Las Vegas), and a 50-mile (80 km) ultramarathon in 2018 at the Bonneville Salt Flats in Utah. In an interview she revealed that an injury she sustained had ended her dreams of being an athlete, saying "I got a third-degree ankle sprain practicing long jump... I never fully recovered."

Wolf gave birth to her first child in the fall of 2023. In May 2025, Wolf reported on her podcast, Thought Box, that she has a husband. In 2025, she was pregnant with her second child. On August 25, she said she declined to perform at Saudi Arabia's Riyadh Comedy Festival "because it's supposed to be, like, five days after I'm having a baby."

She lives in Barcelona, Spain.
