= The Last Shift =

2020 American comedy film

- Theatrical release poster
- Directed by: Andrew Cohn
- Written by: Andrew Cohn
- Produced by: Albert Berger; Ron Yerxa; Sam Bisbee; Alex Lipschultz; Bert Kern
- Starring: Richard Jenkins; Shane Paul McGhie; Da'Vine Joy Randolph; Birgundi Baker; Allison Tolman; Ed O'Neill
- Cinematography: W. Mott Hupfel III
- Edited by: Mindy Elliott
- Music by: Mark Orton
- Production companies: Bona Fide Productions; Park Pictures; Whitewater Films
- Distributed by: Stage 6 Films (through Sony Pictures Releasing)
- Release dates: January 27, 2020 (Sundance); September 25, 2020 (United States)
- Running time: 90 minutes
- Country: United States
- Language: English
- Box office: $1 million

The Last Shift is a 2020 American comedy-drama film written and directed by Andrew Cohn in his narrative directorial debut. It stars Richard Jenkins, Shane Paul McGhie, Da'Vine Joy Randolph, Birgundi Baker, Allison Tolman and Ed O'Neill.

== Cast ==
- Richard Jenkins as Stanley
- Shane Paul McGhie as Jevon
- Da'Vine Joy Randolph as Shazz
- Birgundi Baker as Sidney
- Allison Tolman as Mrs. Kelly
- Ed O'Neill as Dale
- Alex Stein as Rich

== Production ==
In July 2019, it was announced Richard Jenkins, Shane Paul McGhie, Da'Vine Joy Randolph, Birgundi Baker, Allison Tolman and Ed O'Neill had joined the cast of the film, with Andrew Cohn directing from a screenplay he wrote.

== Release ==
It had its world premiere at the Sundance Film Festival on January 27, 2020. In September 2020, Sony Pictures Releasing acquired distribution rights to the film and set it for a September 25, 2020, release.

== Reception ==
=== Critical response ===
On the review aggregator website Rotten Tomatoes, 66% of 35 critics' reviews are positive, with an average rating of 6.4/10. The website's consensus reads: "The Last Shift doesn't quite reach the potential of its premise, however a powerful performance from Richard Jenkins makes it worth the watch." Metacritic, which uses a weighted average, assigned the film a score of 58 out of 100, based on 14 critics, indicating "mixed or average" reviews.

=== Box office ===
The Last Shift grossed $1.03 million in the United States and Canada.
