= Frank the Bastard =

- Film poster
- Directed by: Brad Coley
- Written by: Brad Coley
- Produced by: Ged Dickersin
- Starring: Rachel Miner; Andy Comeau
- Cinematography: David Daniel
- Edited by: Seth Anderson; Sabine Hoffman
- Music by: Rob Burger
- Production company: Big Indie Pictures
- Distributed by: Paladin
- Release dates: October 31, 2013 (Savannah Film and Video Festival); July 24, 2015 (United States)
- Running time: 111 minutes
- Country: United States
- Language: English

Frank the Bastard is a 2013 American thriller film written and directed by Brad Coley and starring Rachel Miner and Andy Comeau.

== Plot ==
A writer travels back to her Maine hometown where she discovers the truth behind her mother's death and encounters a land developer of dubious character along with his mysterious son.

== Cast ==
- Rachel Miner as Clair
- William Sadler as Cyrus Gast
- Wendy Vanden Heuvel as Alice
- Andy Comeau as Frank
- Shamika Cotton as Isolda
- Ellen Albertini Dow as Dora
- Chris Sarandon as Tristan Pace
- Matthew Maher as Worm

== Reception ==
The film has an 11% rating on Rotten Tomatoes.
