= Sitting in Bars with Cake =

Romantic comedy film by Trish Sie

- Directed by: Trish Sie
- Screenplay by: Audrey Shulman
- Based on: Sitting in Bars with Cake by Audrey Shulman
- Produced by: Susan Cartsonis; Brent Emery; Suzanne Farwell; Nick Moceri
- Starring: Yara Shahidi; Odessa A'zion; Navid Negahban; Martha Kelly; Adina Porter; Ron Livingston; Bette Midler
- Cinematography: Matthew Clark
- Edited by: Lauren Connelly
- Music by: Jeff Cardoni
- Production companies: Amazon MGM Studios (Note: Released under the Metro-Goldwyn-Mayer banner.); Resonate Entertainment; All Night Diner; Big Indie Pictures
- Distributed by: Amazon Prime Video
- Release date: September 8, 2023
- Running time: 120 minutes
- Country: United States
- Language: English

Sitting in Bars with Cake is a 2023 American romantic comedy-drama film directed by Trish Sie and adapted by Audrey Shulman from her 2016 book and inspired by true events. The film stars Yara Shahidi and Odessa A'zion, with Navid Negahban, Martha Kelly, Adina Porter, Ron Livingston and Bette Midler appearing in supporting roles. Its plot follows talented but shy baker Jane and her best friend Corinne who convinces her to bring cakes to bars, to help her build confidence but when Corinne receives a brain cancer diagnosis, their lives change.

Sitting in Bars with Cake was released on September 8, 2023, by Amazon Prime Video. The film received generally positive reviews from critics.

== Plot ==
Jane and Corinne, best friends since they were seven, live together in Los Angeles. Corinne is the ultimate extrovert, while Jane is introverted.

Corinne works with powerhouse talent agent Benita as her assistant, where Jane works in the mailroom. Jane has a crush on lawyer Owen who is interning in the company, but hides from him because of her timidity.

On March 7, Corinne's birthday, Jane brings her homemade birthday cake out with them. Corinne insists they share it around the bar. This inspires Corinne's idea to get Jane, to commit to a year of baking cakes and bringing them to bars with the goal of meeting people.

Corinne and Jane map out a plan to hit one bar a week for a year. They try to hit many different demographics, and she makes each cake to reflect each clientele. Corinne also chooses Jane's outfits to improve her chances.

Jane's parents Tasha and Isaac take her and Corinne out for Chinese, as they are in LA for a lawyers conference. Well-respected human rights lawyers, they expect her to follow in their footsteps, although she actually wants to become a professional baker.

During their cake experiment, they tally Jane's success in interacting with men. The first sends her a dick pic, she line dances with another, and gets numbers and kisses.

Meanwhile, Benita promotes Corinne to junior agent. Jane and friends celebrate that night for drinks, but later on Corinne has a seizure following an extreme headache. An MRI and biopsy confirm a brain tumor, a life-altering diagnosis.

Corinne's parents Ruth and Fred Thompson try to take her back to Phoenix, Arizona, for treatment, but she chooses to stay in Los Angeles. Jane insists she can handle it, but they stay until they are sure. In the meantime her dad constantly finds handyman projects around to do.

During her treatment, Corinne still goes with Jane and cakes to bars, calling it cakebarring. Their boss organises a 5K run fundraising event for Corinne and also acupuncture and an emotional support dog.

Meanwhile Jane is finally brave enough to meet with Owen, under the guise of learning more about international property law. Corinne is thrilled, especially as it's a way to distract away from her cancer.

In November Corinne breaks up with Dave and tells Tasha and Isaac about Jane’s disinterest in law. The cancer fundraiser takes place. She also unfortunately receives bad news from her doctor that her cancer now is more aggressive than originally believed and essentially terminal, especially as attempts to join a clinical trial are unsuccessful.

By Thanksgiving Corinne had to return to the hospital for a time. With 17 cakes left to deliver via cakebarring, Jane gets a second wind. Christmas comes and she finally starts to have a clearer idea of what she wants. Jane realises that Owen may not be 'the one', and she finally tells her parents that the idea of law school doesn't inspire her.

They go to a bar with everyone to do karaoke, a favorite activity of Corinne's. When she's too weak to finish a song, Jane pushes aside her stage fright to support her.

Quitting her mailroom job to become Corinne's fulltime caregiver for her remaining months, Jane both says goodbye to her job and Owen, who she's decided to stop dating. The girls are together right up to the end. They have her celebration of life in Arizona.

Although heartbroken, Jane delivers the 50th cake, Corinne's birthday cake. Then as promised, she opens her specialty cake shop Silverlake Cake Bar in LA.

== Cast ==
- Yara Shahidi as Jane
- Odessa A'zion as Corinne
- Bette Midler as Benita
- Ron Livingston as Fred
- Martha Kelly as Ruth
- Maia Mitchell as Liz
- Charlie Morgan Patton as Alex
- Simone Recasner as Nora
- Rish Shah as Owen
- Aaron Dominguez as Dave
- Will Ropp as Brock
- Adina Porter as Tasha
- Navid Negahban as Isaac
- Diep Tran as Dì Lang
- Reshma Gajjar as Dr. Mitchell

== Production ==
On February 9, 2022, it was reported that Yara Shahidi would be starring in and executive producing the Amazon Studios romantic comedy-drama Sitting in Bars with Cake based on the blog and book of the same name by Audrey Shulman. Trish Sie joined the film as director while Shulman adapted the script. On September 22, 2022, Bette Midler, Ron Livingston, Maia Mitchell, Aaron Dominguez, Rish Shah, Odessa A’zion, Martha Kelly, Adina Porter, Navid Negahban, Simone Recasner, Will Ropp and Charlie Patton have joined the cast. Principal photography took place in Los Angeles in October 2022. It is the first film to be distributed through Amazon MGM Studios Distribution, a new film and television distribution unit for Amazon and MGM projects, with this film being released through the MGM banner.

== Reception ==
=== Critical response ===
On the review aggregator website Rotten Tomatoes, 77% of 44 critics' reviews are positive, with an average rating of 6.5/10. The website's consensus reads: "A well-acted if slightly formulaic story of friendship, Sitting in Bars with Cake moves between laughter and tears without succumbing to melodrama." Metacritic, which uses a weighted average, assigned the film a score of 64 out of 100, based on 10 critics, indicating "generally favorable" reviews.

Film critic Natasha Alvar from Cultured Vultures compared Sitting in Bars with Cake with 1980s comedy-dramas like Beaches and Steel Magnolias. Adrian Horton from The Guardian wrote in her review: "Shahidi is capable if a tad recessive as the film’s emotional center, one whose can-do attitude is both grating and absolutely necessary. But it’s A’Zion’s performance that sparkles; her Corinne – vivacious and deadpan, her rapid-fire wit papering over a visceral denial – adds some much needed tartness to a recipe that could easily become too maudlin. “Most of the time, I don’t feel like a sick person,” she bitterly admits after a workplace-sponsored fundraiser for her illness, and it's true; even as Corinne's condition deteriorates, A’Zion's performance maintains a distinct, bristly vitality." Sheila O'Malley from RogerEbert.com also give the film positive review and praised A'zion's performance: "Because Corinne's diagnosis is so central, the film thankfully avoids the trap of "illness as plot point", and A'zion's performance is so strong it's impossible not to feel Corinne's sense of loss, her sense of how unfair it all is, even when (or especially when) she tries to cover it up with cracking a joke." Meanwhile, Amy Nicholson from Variety gave it a negative review for having too much of a melodramatic tone.

=== Accolades ===
Award	Category	Recipient(s)	Result	Ref
The ReFrame Stamp	Best Feature		Won	
Guild of Music Supervisors Awards	Best Music Supervision for a Non-Theatrically Released Film	Liz Gallacher	Nominated	
55th NAACP Image Awards	Outstanding Actress in a Motion Picture	Yara Shahidi	Nominated	

== See also ==
- Beaches (1988) another comedy-drama film starring Bette Midler with a similar premise.
