= Andrew Cohn =

American dramatist

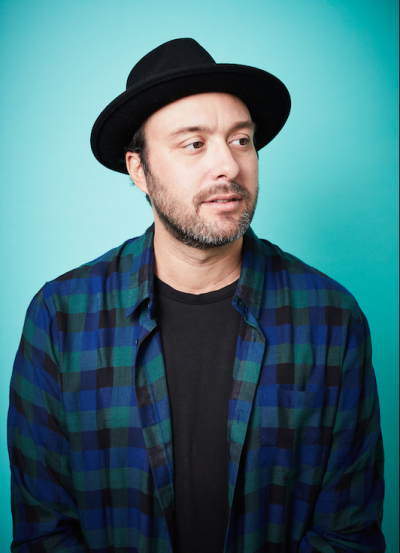
- Born: Ann Arbor, Michigan
- Occupation: Writer/Director

Andrew Cohn is an American writer and director originally from Ann Arbor, Michigan. His feature film, The Last Shift, premiered at the 2020 Sundance Film Festival and was released by Sony Pictures in over 150 cities nationwide. The film stars two-time Academy Award nominee Richard Jenkins and is executive produced by Oscar-winning director Alexander Payne. Prior to his work in fiction, Cohn was best known for his vérité style documentary films.

In 2018, Cohn directed Warriors of Liberty City, a 6-part documentary series for Starz, which the L.A. Times called "one of the best reasons to turn on a television this fall." His film, Night School, premiered at the 2016 Tribeca Film Festival, was supported by a MacArthur grant and was released by Oscilloscope Laboratories. He is the director of the documentary Kid Danny, part of ESPN Films’ 30 for 30 series; his concert documentary Danny Brown: Live at The Majestic was released through Apple Music. Cohn's debut film, Medora, executive produced by Steve Buscemi and Stanley Tucci, aired on the acclaimed PBS series Independent Lens, and won an Emmy Award.

== Filmography ==
- Dynamic Tom, 2009
- Chile Road, 2011
- Medora, 2013 (with Beachside Films)
- Kid Danny, 2014 (with ESPN Films)
- Night School, 2016
- Danny Brown: Live at the Majestic, 2018
- Destination Park, 2018
- Warriors of Liberty City, 2018 (with Starz)
- The Last Shift, 2020 (with Park Pictures and Bona Fide Productions)
