= Antoinette Robertson =

American actress

- Occupation: Actress
- Years active: 2010–present
- Known for: Dear White People

Antoinette Robertson is an American and Jamaican (Note: Grew up in Jamaica as per Hypebae source) actress, known for her roles in the Oprah Winfrey Network prime time soap opera, The Haves and the Have Nots (2014–18), and Netflix comedy-drama series Dear White People (2017–2021).

== Life and career ==
Robertson began her acting career in William Esper Studio. Her first notable role was in the CW comedy-drama series Hart of Dixie (2013–14). In 2014, she was cast in a recurring role in the Oprah Winfrey Network prime time soap opera, The Haves and the Have Nots playing the role of Melissa Wilson. She was promoted to series regular in season five, her final season on show.

In 2017, Robertson was cast as Colandrea 'Coco' Conners in the Netflix comedy-drama series, Dear White People. The series ended in 2021. In 2021, she had a recurring role in the Canadian drama series, Diggstown.

== Filmography ==
=== Film ===
Year	Title	Role	Notes
2010	Eros	Woman	Short
2011	Alterations	Brandy	Short
2011	Bittersweets	Emily	
2016	Late Bloomer	Nancy Albright	TV movie
2022	Block Party	Keke McQueen	
2022	The Blackening	Lisa	

=== Television ===
Year	Title	Role	Notes
2012	A Gifted Man	Girl Basketball Player	Episode: "In Case of Blind Spots"
2013	Zero Hour	Alima	Episode: "Spring" & "Ratchet"
2013-14	Hart of Dixie	Lynly Hayes	Recurring cast: Season 3
2014-18	The Haves and the Have Nots	Melissa Wilson	Recurring cast: season 1-4
2016	Mary + Jane	Lindsay	Episode: "Sn**chelorette"
2016	Atlanta	Janice	Episode: "The Club"
2017–21	Dear White People	Colandrea 'Coco' Conners	Main cast
2020	FBI: Most Wanted	Sandra Coates	Episode: "Caesar"
2021	Diggstown	Vivian Jefferson	Recurring cast: season 3

== Awards and nominations ==
Year	Awards	Category	Recipient	Outcome
2018	Black Reel Awards	Black Reel Award for Outstanding Supporting Actress, Comedy Series	"Dear White People"	Nominated
