= The Upshaws =

American sitcom

- Genre: Sitcom
- Created by: Regina Y. Hicks; Wanda Sykes
- Showrunners: Regina Y. Hicks; Wanda Sykes
- Starring: Mike Epps; Wanda Sykes; Kim Fields; Diamond Lyons; Khali Spraggins; Journey Christine; Jermelle Simon
- Opening theme: "Solid" by Ashford & Simpson
- Country of origin: United States
- Original language: English
- No. of seasons: 5
- No. of episodes: 60

Production
- Executive producers: Regina Y. Hicks; Wanda Sykes; Page Hurwitz; Mike Epps; Niles Kirchner; Annie Levine; Jonathan Emerson
- Editors: Russell Griffin, ACE
- Running time: 25–29 minutes
- Production companies: Savannah Sweet Productions; Push It Productions; Naptown Productions

Original release
- Network: Netflix
- Release: May 12, 2021 – January 15, 2026

The Upshaws is an American television sitcom created by Regina Y. Hicks and Wanda Sykes. The series stars Sykes, Mike Epps, Kim Fields, Diamond Lyons, Khali Spraggins, Journey Christine, and Jermelle Simon. The series premiered on Netflix on May 12, 2021.

In June 2021, the series was renewed for a second season, with the first part being released on June 29, 2022. The second part of the second season premiered on February 16, 2023. In October 2022, the series was renewed for a third season, which premiered on August 17, 2023. In December 2023, the series was renewed for a 10-episode fourth season. In June 2024, the series was renewed for a 12-episode fifth and final season, which was released on January 15, 2026.

== Premise ==
This comedy series follows an African-American working-class family from Indiana, struggling to make ends meet as they pursue the American dream without a clear path to get there.

== Cast and characters ==
=== Main ===
- Mike Epps as Bernard "Bennie" Upshaw Sr., patriarch of the Upshaw family, Regina's high-school sweetheart and eventual husband. He is an auto mechanic and the owner of Bennie's Garage.
- Wanda Sykes as Lucretia Turner, Regina's rich older sister, who has an antagonistic relationship with Bennie. Lucretia is now married to Frank. She travels back and forth between Indiana and Georgia.
- Kim Fields as Regina Upshaw (née Turner), the matriarch of the Upshaw family; Bennie Sr's wife; mother of Bernard Jr., Aaliyah, and Maya, and stepmother of Kelvin. She works as a healthcare manager.
- Diamond Lyons as Kelvin Upshaw, Bennie and Tasha's son who is the same age as Aaliyah, who calls Kelvin her "Ghetto Twin". He was conceived when Bennie thought he and Regina were on a break.
- Khali Spraggins as Aaliyah Upshaw, Bennie and Regina's older daughter
- Journey Christine as Maya Upshaw, Bennie and Regina's younger daughter
- Jermelle Simon as Bernard Upshaw Jr., Bennie and Regina's firstborn, and their only son together. He has a strained relationship with his father, who wasn't there for him until he was 16.

=== Recurring ===
- Gabrielle Dennis as Tasha (seasons 1–4; guest, season 5), Kelvin's mother
- Page Kennedy as Duck (seasons 1–2; guest, season 3), an old friend of Bennie's who also works at his garage. He is recently out of prison and has become a born-again Christian.
- Mike Estimé as Tony, Bennie's friend and employee
- Leonard Earl Howze as Davis, another of Bennie's friends
- Dayna Dooley as Sheila (season 2; guest, seasons 1, 3–5), Regina's boss at the hospital
- Daria Johns as Savannah, Aaliyah's best friend (seasons 2, 5; guest, seasons 1, 3–4)
- Lamont Thompson as Frank, Lucretia's husband (seasons 2, 4–5; guest season 3)
- Sharifa Oliver as Monique Robinson, Bernard's ex-girlfriend, mother of their daughter Sydney. She is a police officer.
- Ayaammi Sledge as Sydney Robinson (season 2; guest, seasons 1, 3–5), Bernard's daughter by Monique
- Jessica Morris as Amy, Regina's friend
- Dewayne Perkins as Hector (season 2; guest, seasons 1, 3–5), Bernard Jr.'s on-again/off-again boyfriend
- Phil Morris as Spencer Soldy (seasons 4–5), a former client of Bennie, and Regina's opponent in the city council election

=== Guest ===
- Kym Whitley as Althea Turner (seasons 2–5), Regina and Lucretia's sister
- Jenifer Lewis as Dr. Pearl Edmunds (seasons 3 and 5), Regina’s therapist
- Marsha Warfield as Glodine Upshaw (seasons 3–5), Bennie’s mother
- Yvette Nicole Brown as Joyce Miller (seasons 4–5), Aaliyah’s school principal
- Marla Gibbs as Mabel Anderson (season 5), an lady living in a nursing home whose vote Regina is trying to secure for her city council election

== Episodes ==
=== Series overview ===
Season	Episodes		Originally released
1	10		May 12, 2021
2	16	8	June 29, 2022
2	16	8	February 16, 2023
3	12	6	August 17, 2023
3	12	6	April 18, 2024
4	10		January 9, 2025
5	12		January 15, 2026

=== Season 1 (2021) ===
No. overall	No. in season	Title	Directed by	Written by	Original release date
1	1	"Birthday B.S."	Ken Whittingham	Regina Y. Hicks & Wanda Sykes	May 12, 2021
Bennie's two kids: Kelvin and Aaliyah have a birthday at the same time. Bennie tries to find time to be at both parties, worried that he won't get to spend time with his kids, so he goes back and forth to make sure he has time to go from one party to the other. Eventually, he is caught and realizes he has to confess the truth.
2	2	"The Hook-Up"	Robbie Countryman & Ken Whittingham	Annie Levine & Jonathan Emerson	May 12, 2021
Bennie takes Regina to a fancy restaurant and meets the manager of the establishment. He later takes her out in the hopes of breaking their lengthy dry spell, which they've had for a long time. Bennie gets an unexpected surprise when he realizes that the meal wasn't free.
3	3	"Joy Ride"	Ken Whittingham	Mark Alton Brown	May 12, 2021
4	4	"Big Plans"	Sheldon Epps	Mitchell Marchand	May 12, 2021
5	5	"Ridin' Dirty"	Robbie Countryman	Allie Romano	May 12, 2021
6	6	"Last Straw"	Sheldon Epps	Regina Y. Hicks	May 12, 2021
7	7	"Yard Sale"	Kelly Park	Dino Shorte	May 12, 2021
8	8	"Night Out"	Phill Lewis	Anil K. Foreman	May 12, 2021
9	9	"Gloves Off"	Phill Lewis	Annie Levine & Jonathan Emerson	May 12, 2021
10	10	"The Backslide"	Sheldon Epps	Annie Levine & Jonathan Emerson	May 12, 2021

=== Season 2 (2022–23) ===
No. overall	No. in season	Title	Directed by	Written by	Original release date
Part 1
11	1	"Maybe Daddy"	Sheldon Epps	Regina Y. Hicks & Wanda Sykes	June 29, 2022
12	2	"Bennie's Woman"	Sheldon Epps	Annie Levine & Jonathan Emerson	June 29, 2022
13	3	"Testing, Testing"	Robbie Countryman	Mark Alton Brown	June 29, 2022
14	4	"Control Issues"	Robbie Countryman	Mitchell Marchand	June 29, 2022
15	5	"Duct Up"	Phill Lewis	Dino Shorte	June 29, 2022
16	6	"New Growth"	Phill Lewis	Nicole Bilbrew	June 29, 2022
17	7	"Sista, Sista"	Kelly Park	Darryl Wesley	June 29, 2022
18	8	"Goin' In"	Linda Mendoza	Annie Levine & Jonathan Emerson	June 29, 2022
Part 2
19	9	"The Unforgiven"	Lynda Tarryk	Regina Y. Hicks	February 16, 2023
20	10	"Home Repairs"	Victor Gonzalez	Jonterri Gadson	February 16, 2023
21	11	"Treading Water"	Kim Fields	Erin Jackson	February 16, 2023
22	12	"Off Beat"	Regina Y. Hicks	Michael P. Fox	February 16, 2023
23	13	"Lane Change"	Robbie Countryman	Mark Alton Brown	February 16, 2023
24	14	"Heart Wants"	Juanesta Holmes	Annie Levine & Jonathan Emerson	February 16, 2023
25	15	"Heart Matters"	Sheldon Epps	Mitchell Marchand	February 16, 2023
26	16	"Now What"	Sheldon Epps	Story by : Erin Jackson & Jonterri Gadson; Teleplay by : Dino Shorte & Nicole Bilbrew	February 16, 2023

=== Season 3 (2023–24) ===
No. overall	No. in season	Title	Directed by	Written by	Original release date
Part 1
27	1	"Thera Please"	Kim Fields	Regina Y. Hicks	August 17, 2023
28	2	"Need Change"	Robbie Countryman	Annie Levine & Jonathan Emerson	August 17, 2023
29	3	"Forbidden Fruit"	Lynda Tarryk	Mark Alton Brown	August 17, 2023
30	4	"Slap Happy"	Robbie Countryman	Dino Shorte	August 17, 2023
31	5	"Really, Mama?"	Lynda Tarryk	Mitchell Marchand	August 17, 2023
32	6	"Auto Motives"	Robbie Countryman	Regina Y. Hicks & Annie Levine & Jonathan Emerson	August 17, 2023
Part 2
33	7	"Hail Mary"	Victor Gonzalez	Nicole Bilbrew	April 18, 2024
34	8	"Electric Feels"	Victor Gonzalez	Erin Jackson	April 18, 2024
35	9	"Background Checkered"	Esther Himbaugh Treadway	Michael P. Fox	April 18, 2024
36	10	"Girl Trouble"	Lynda Tarryk	Regina Y. Hicks & Annie Levine & Jonathan Emerson	April 18, 2024
37	11	"Ain't Broke"	Robbie Countryman	Story by : Michael J. S. Murphy; Teleplay by : Mark Alton Brown	April 18, 2024
38	12	"Do I?"	Regina Y. Hicks	Story by : Annie Levine & Jonathan Emerson; Teleplay by : Devon Shepard & Dino Shorté	April 18, 2024

=== Season 4 (2025) ===
No. overall	No. in season	Title	Directed by	Written by	Original release date
39	1	"Gone, But..."	Kim Fields	Regina Y. Hicks & Wanda Sykes	January 9, 2025
40	2	"She's Back"	Victor Gonzalez	Annie Levine & Jonathan Emerson	January 9, 2025
41	3	"Running Numbers"	Robbie Countryman	Devon Shepard	January 9, 2025
42	4	"Hold Up"	Lynda Tarryk	Mark Alton Brown	January 9, 2025
43	5	"Grifter, Grifter"	Robbie Countryman	Dino Shorté	January 9, 2025
44	6	"Who, Me?"	Robbie Countryman	Darryl Wesley	January 9, 2025
45	7	"Tee'd Off"	Esther Himbaugh Treadway	Erin Jackson	January 9, 2025
46	8	"& Son"	Kelly Park	Michael P. Fox	January 9, 2025
47	9	"Lost Causes"	Robbie Countryman	Annie Levine & Jonathan Emerson & Michael J.S. Murphy	January 9, 2025
48	10	"Buy Now"	Regina Y. Hicks	Story by : Mark Alton Brown & Devon Shepard; Teleplay by : Dino Shorté & Darryl Wesley	January 9, 2025

=== Season 5 (2026) ===
No. overall	No. in season	Title	Directed by	Written by	Original release date
49	1	"The Black-Lash"	Kim Fields	Regina Y. Hicks & Wanda Sykes & Michael P. Fox	January 15, 2026
50	2	"Save Face"	Robbie Countryman	Annie Levine & Jonathan Emerson & Michael P. Fox	January 15, 2026
51	3	"Gone Awry"	Robbie Countryman	Mark Alton Brown & Michael P. Fox	January 15, 2026
52	4	"Indy Streets"	Robbie Countryman	Devon Shepard & Michael P. Fox	January 15, 2026
53	5	"Cold Shoulder"	Robbie Countryman	Dino Shorté & Michael P. Fox	January 15, 2026
54	6	"Hole-y Hell"	Robbie Countryman	Lance Crouther & Michael P. Fox	January 15, 2026
55	7	"Great Points"	Lynda Tarryk	Erin Jackson & Michael P. Fox	January 15, 2026
56	8	"Worked Up"	Robbie Countryman	Darryl Wesley & Michael P. Fox	January 15, 2026
57	9	"Election Day"	Phill Lewis	Michael P. Fox	January 15, 2026
58	10	"I Swear"	Esther Himbaugh	Michael J.S. Murphy & Michael P. Fox	January 15, 2026
59	11	"Help Less"	Kim Fields	Annie Levine & Jonathan Emerson & Adam Ruben	January 15, 2026
60	12	"Bon Voyage"	Regina Y. Hicks	Regina Y. Hicks & Wanda Sykes & Annie Levine & Jonathan Emerson	January 15, 2026

== Production ==
=== Development ===
On August 20, 2019, Netflix gave production a series order. The Upshaws is created by Regina Y. Hicks and Wanda Sykes who are expected to executive produce alongside Mike Epps, Niles Kirchner, and Page Hurwitz. Push It Productions is the production company involved with producing the series. The series was released on May 12, 2021. On June 24, 2021, Netflix renewed the series for a 16-episode second season. The first part of the second season was released on June 29, 2022. The second part of was released on February 16, 2023. On October 26, 2022, Netflix renewed the series for a third season which was released on August 17, 2023. On December 1, 2023, Netflix renewed the series for a fourth season. On June 7, 2024, Netflix renewed the series for a 12-episode fifth and final season.

The series is set in Indianapolis, but it is shot in the Old Warner Brothers Studio in California.

=== Casting ===
Upon series order announcement, Sykes and Epps were also cast to star. On March 4, 2020, Kim Fields joined the cast in a starring role. On December 2, 2020, Gabrielle Dennis, Page Kennedy, Diamond Lyons, Khali Daniya-Renee Spraggins, Jermelle Simon, and Journey Christine were cast in starring roles.

== Reception ==
For the series, review aggregator Rotten Tomatoes reported an approval rating of 63% based on 8 critic reviews, with an average rating of 7/10. Metacritic gave the series a weighted average score of 57 out of 100 based on 5 critic reviews, indicating "mixed or average reviews".
