= Tracy Oliver =

American screenwriter

- Born: Tracy Yvonne Oliver; 1988 or 1989 (age 36–37)
- Education: Stanford University (BA); University of Southern California (MFA)
- Occupations: Screenwriter; producer; director; actress

Tracy Yvonne Oliver is a screenwriter, producer, director, and actress. Oliver originally starred in the web series The Mis-Adventures of Awkward Black Girl (2011–2012) before serving as a writer on two comedy television series: ABC's The Neighbors (2012–2014) and Starz's Survivor's Remorse (2014–2015). Oliver also created and executive produced the comedy Harlem for Amazon Prime Video (2021-2025)

Oliver has co-written three movies: Barbershop: The Next Cut (2016), Girls Trip (2017), and Little (2019), with Girls Trip making her the first African-American woman to write a film that grossed over US$100 million. Oliver also created and wrote the BET television series First Wives Club and wrote the screenplay to the 2019 film adaptation of The Sun Is Also a Star.

== Career ==
Oliver is originally from South Carolina. She attended Stanford University, where she double majored in American studies and drama with hopes of becoming an actress, before becoming disillusioned with the roles she was getting. There, she met Issa Rae in a drama class, where the two first collaborated. After graduating from Stanford, Oliver attended the USC School of Cinematic Arts and graduated in 2010 with a Master's of Fine Arts in producing for film, television and new media. After earning her master's, Oliver created the black theater company Black Stage. She portrayed Nina, the antagonist in Rae's web series The Mis-Adventures of Awkward Black Girl, from 2011 to 2012. In addition to acting in Awkward Black Girl, Oliver also served as a writer and producer. Oliver wrote and circulated a spec script for a movie called Marriage Is for White People based on the "aggressive erasure of people of color" she observed in the 2009 romantic comedy film He's Just Not That Into You. The script got the attention of Dan Fogelman, who had the same manager as Oliver at the time and soon hired her as a writer on ABC's comedy-science fiction series The Neighbors, which ran from 2012 to 2014. Oliver then became a staff writer and story editor on the Starz comedy-drama television series Survivor's Remorse.

Oliver partnered with Black-ish creator Kenya Barris to write the 2016 comedy film Barbershop: The Next Cut, starring Ice Cube and Cedric the Entertainer. The movie received positive reviews and grossed $55 million on a budget of $20 million. Oliver and Barris then co-wrote Girls Trip (2017), starring Queen Latifah, Regina Hall, Jada Pinkett Smith, and Tiffany Haddish. Girls Trip received positive reviews and grossed over $140 million worldwide, making Oliver the first African-American woman to write a film that grossed over $100 million.

She re-teamed with Barris on the 2019 film Little, which he co-produced and she co-wrote; she also received a "story by" credit. Her first solo feature film writing credit came with the 2019 film The Sun Is Also a Star, an adaptation of the 2016 Nicola Yoon novel of the same name, which she also executive produced. Oliver was the showrunner and executive producer for the BET+ television series First Wives Club, an adaptation of the 1996 film of the same name with an all-black lead cast consisting of Jill Scott, Ryan Michelle Bathe, and Michelle Buteau. Its first season, which ran in 2019 and whose episodes were each directed exclusively by women directors, received critical praise, and it was renewed for a second season. She directed an episode of the show, making her directorial debut. Oliver serves as creator, writer, and executive producer of the Amazon Studios half-hour television series Harlem, a single camera comedy starring Meagan Good, Grace Byers, Jerrie Johnson and Shoniqua Shandai. Malcolm D. Lee, who directed Girl's Trip, directed the first two episodes.

A follow-up to Girl's Trip is reportedly in the works, with Oliver having written a treatment for it. Oliver has also been reported to be writing a reboot to the 1995 film Clueless. Oliver was included on the 2020 Ebony Power 100 List. In March 2021, she signed an overall deal with Apple through her production company, Tracy Yvonne Productions.

== Filmography ==
=== Television ===
Year(s)	Series	Functioned as					Ref.
Year(s)	Series	Writer	Creator	Executive producer	Actress	Director	Ref.
2011–2012	The Mis-Adventures of Awkward Black Girl	Yes	No	No	Yes (Note: Lead role as Nina, 13 episodes.)	No	
2012–2013	The Neighbors	Yes	No	No	No	No	
2014–2015	Survivor's Remorse	Yes (Note: Credited as executive story editor.)	No	No	No	No	
2019–2021	First Wives Club	Yes	Yes	Yes	No	Yes	
2021–2025	Harlem	Yes	Yes	Yes	No	No	

=== Film ===
Year	Film	Functioned as			Notes	Ref.
Year	Film	Writer	Executive producer	Director	Notes	Ref.
2016	Barbershop: The Next Cut	Yes	No	No		
2017	Girls Trip	Yes	No	No		
2017	Trip	Yes	No	Yes	Short film	
2019	Little	Yes	No	No		
2019	The Sun Is Also a Star	Yes	Yes	No		
2022	The Blackening	Yes	No	No		
