= The Break with Michelle Wolf =

- Genre: Variety show
- Directed by: André Allen
- Presented by: Michelle Wolf
- Starring: DJ Jer-Z
- Country of origin: United States
- Original language: English
- No. of seasons: 1
- No. of episodes: 10

Production
- Executive producers: Michelle Wolf; Christine Nangle; Dan Powell; Daniel Bodansky
- Running time: 23–30 minutes
- Production companies: Cats in Pants; Irony Point

Original release
- Network: Netflix
- Release: May 27 – July 29, 2018

The Break with Michelle Wolf is an American television variety show starring Michelle Wolf that premiered on May 27, 2018, on Netflix. The series is executive produced by Wolf, Dan Powell, Christine Nangle, and Daniel Bodansky. Powell and Nangle also act as showrunners for the series. On August 17, 2018, it was announced that Netflix had canceled the series.

== Premise ==
The Break with Michelle Wolf was designed to "take a break from the seriousness of late-night comedy" and "instead of making the news fun, she’ll make fun of everything and everybody. There will be no preaching or political agenda — unless it’s funny."

== Production ==
On February 12, 2018, it was announced that Netflix had given the production a series order consisting of ten episodes and expected the show to begin airing sometime in late 2018. The series was set to star Michelle Wolf who also executive produces alongside Dan Powell, Christine Nangle, and Daniel Bodansky. Powell and Nangle were also expected to act as showrunners for the series. Wolf's production company Cats in Pants was expected to produce the series as well.

== Cancellation ==
On April 11, 2018, it was announced that the show had been titled The Break with Michelle Wolf and that it would premiere on May 27, 2018. On August 17, 2018, it was announced that Netflix had declined to renew the series, reportedly due to low viewership, effectively canceling it.

== Episodes ==
No.	Title	Featured guest	Original release date
1	"Strong Female Lead"	Amber Ruffin	May 27, 2018
2	"Be Honest"	Neal Brennan	June 3, 2018
3	"Bad Opinions"	Tim Cappello	June 10, 2018
4	"Hate It or Love It"	Hannibal Buress	June 17, 2018
5	"Entertainment Explosion!"	N/A	June 24, 2018
6	"Perfect Sports"	Nick Kroll	July 1, 2018
7	"How Dare You!?"	Seth Meyers	July 8, 2018
8	"Sincere and Angry"	N/A	July 15, 2018
9	"I Pledge Allegiance"	N/A	July 22, 2018
10	"Wet Boys"	N/A	July 29, 2018

== Release ==
On April 28, 2018, the first trailer for the series was released following Wolf's hosting stint at the 2018 White House Correspondents Dinner. On May 18, 2018, a second trailer was released. About a week later, a clip from the first episode was released.

== Reception ==
The series was met with a positive response from critics upon its premiere. On the review aggregation website Rotten Tomatoes, the first season holds a 77% approval rating with an average rating of 8 out of 10 based on 13 reviews. The website's critical consensus reads, "The Break With Michelle Wolf has room for improvement, but this late-night show is a welcome break from the norm."

Early critical reviews of the series premiere were largely positive. In a positive review, The Globe and Mail's John Doyle offered the series commendation saying, "This is more laid-back, low-key, absurdist feminist humour. It's wickedly entertaining, coming out of left field into a very crowded arena." In another favorable assessment, The Guardian's Charles Bramesco said, "Wolf's pilot episode prophesies a brief period of growing pains in pursuit of an individual identity, and grand dividends once it's complete." In an additional approving analysis, Variety's Caroline Framke said, "Whether she’s tearing down a politician, scoffing at a sexist institution, or telling her audience it deserves a break (pun intended) before speeding away on a tricycle, Wolf is always grinning with delight that she gets to do it all on her own weird terms. Not every joke has to land for the show to be even half as much fun as Wolf is clearly having." In a more negative critique, Ken Tucker of Yahoo! TV was less enthusiastic about the series' premiere episode saying, "It wasn't a very auspicious debut; Wolf's standup comedy was OK but not hilarious, and her taped segments demonstrated a tendency to repeat the same joke over and over."

Summarizing his opinion of the series as a whole, Darren Franich of Entertainment Weekly published a review of the series before the premiere of its season finale where he gave it a grade of "B+" and praised it saying, "Jokes won’t fix everything. But whoever said comedy had to do anything? At its best, Wolf’s show has been an earnest plea to keep laughing. It’s a break from bleak times, like how a breath of fresh air is a nice break from drowning."
