= The Dissolve =

Defunct film website

- Website type: Online magazine
- Owner: Pitchfork
- Editor: Scott Tobias
- Website: www.thedissolve.com
- Commercial: Yes
- Registration: No
- Launched: July 10, 2013; 13 years ago
- Current status: Inactive

The Dissolve was a film review, news, and commentary website which was operated by Pitchfork and based in Chicago, Illinois. The site was focused on reviews, commentary, interviews, and news about contemporary and classic films. Its editor was Scott Tobias, the former editor in chief of The A.V. Club. Editorial director Keith Phipps announced The Dissolve's closure on July 8, 2015.

== History ==
After Phipps parted from The A.V. Club, he felt he wanted to focus his career on writing about film opposed to the wide-ranging topics that The A.V. Club discusses. The site launched on July 10, 2013. In the first two weeks of publication, The Dissolve was set to present the following regular articles: The Conversation, which is a weekly discussion between The Dissolve's writers about current films and a Movie of the Week feature, where the staff focuses on a film of their choosing for several days.

On July 8, 2015, The Dissolve announced its closure with editorial director Keith Phipps stating, "Sadly, because of the various challenges inherent in launching a freestanding website in a crowded publishing environment, financial and otherwise, today is the last day we will be doing that." Scott Tobias—in an interview with Indiewire—stated, "This was simply a case of everyone trying their best to make something great and the economics not being kind to those efforts." Former The Dissolve writers Scott Tobias, Keith Phipps, Genevieve Koski, and Tasha Robinson later went on to develop the Next Picture Show podcast.

== Staff ==
Aside from Phipps, The Dissolve's original staff comprised five of his former A.V. Club colleagues: Scott Tobias, Nathan Rabin, Genevieve Koski, Tasha Robinson, and Noel Murray. Staff members Noel Murray left The Dissolve to write freelance status in September 2014, and news editor Matt Singer left to contribute to ScreenCrush in November. Critic Nathan Rabin left the site in May 2015.

The staff also included news editor Rachel Handler, replacing Matt Singer, and contributors Mike D'Angelo and Sam Adams.

== Ratings ==
The Dissolve's film rankings in comparison to other film reviews tended to be more harsh in their 1,555 reviews aggregated by Metacritic, who stated that on average, the website grades films 8.9 points lower than other critics from a 0–100 scale. Their average score is 56. Out of all the reviews, 566 were considered positive, 770 were considered mixed, and 219 were considered negative.

=== The Dissolve Film of the Year ===
Year	Film	Director	Nationality	Top 5 Films	Ref.
2013	Her	Spike Jonze	United States	2nd: 12 Years a Slave dir. Steve McQueen; 3rd: Inside Llewyn Davis dir. Joel and Ethan Coen; 4th: Frances Ha dir. Noah Baumbach; 5th: Upstream Color dir. Shane Carruth	
2014	Boyhood	Richard Linklater	United States	2nd: The Grand Budapest Hotel dir. Wes Anderson; 3rd: Under the Skin dir. Jonathan Glazer; 4th: Whiplash dir. Damien Chazelle; 5th: Only Lovers Left Alive dir. Jim Jarmusch	
