= Ben LeClair =

Ben LeClair is an American film producer.

== Life ==
LeClair grew up in Scituate, Massachusetts . His mother worked for a television provider, so he was able to watch all the movies. He became interested in the industry when The Witches of Eastwick was filmed in the area. He graduated from Scituate High School in 1995.

His entry into the film industry came in 2002 with the film The Hours by Stephen Daldry . He then worked as an assistant on two more films before becoming a producer in 2007 with Year of the Dog, directed by Mike White . After producing Gentlemen Broncos and Upstream Color, he was nominated for a Gotham Award for Best Film in 2013 for the latter. In an interview, LeClair said that this early period with smaller budgets had been difficult for him. After producing Some Beats in 2015 , he was nominated for a Piaget Producers Award in 2018 for the comedy The Lovers.

Since 2019, he has worked at T-Street Productions, founded by Rian Johnson and Ram Bergman . The company prioritizes riskier projects. Starting in 2020, he worked on the production of Fair Play with director Chloe Domont . Due to the COVID-19 pandemic, he had to organize production in Serbia instead of New York City.

In 2023, he worked on American Fiction , for which he returned to his hometown of Scituate in search of locations. A beach house where his former art teacher lives was ultimately chosen. His father also built the wedding gazebo for the marriage scene. According to LeClair, despite its political content, the film was primarily intended for entertainment. In an interview with The Hollywood Reporter, he also praised director Cord Jefferson and lead actor Jeffrey Wright , who he said made the film possible. He added that he was surprised by the buzz surrounding the film, as he usually produces smaller movies. Eventually, the film was nominated for Academy Award for Best Picture ; along with LeClair, director Cord Jefferson and producers Jermaine Johnson and Nikos Karamigios were also nominated. In 2024, he produced the teen film Snack Shack , which he described as a nostalgic trip back to 1990s Nebraska .

== Personal life ==
Since 2001 he has been married to Leslie LeClair, with whom he has two sons. The family lives in Los Angeles .

== Filmography ==
- 2007: Year of the Dog
- 2013: Upstream Color
- 2013: The English Teacher
- 2017: The Lovers
- 2017: Woodshock
- 2023: Fair Play
- 2023: American Fiction
- 2024: Snack Shack
- 2025: All the Devils Are Here
- 2026: The Only Living Pickpocket in New York
