= Erasure (novel) =

2001 novel by Percival Everett

- First edition cover
- Author: Percival Everett
- Language: English
- Genre: Satire
- Publisher: University Press of New England
- Publication date: 2001
- Publication place: United States
- Media type: Print (hardcover and paperback)
- Pages: 265
- Awards: Hurston/Wright Legacy Award (2002)
- ISBN: 1584650907
- OCLC: 46936048

Erasure is a 2001 novel by American writer Percival Everett. It was originally published by the University Press of New England. The novel satirizes the dominant strains of discussion related to the publication and reception of African-American literature, and was later adapted by Cord Jefferson into a film titled American Fiction, starring Jeffrey Wright.

== Plot ==
Erasure's protagonist, Thelonious "Monk" Ellison, named after the American jazz pianist of the same name, a professor of English literature and novelist, is in a rut. He writes novels that are highly academic and philosophical, often with references to Greek mythology and literary theory. Ellison travels to Washington, DC, where he presents a paper to a literary society. During the visit, he witnesses his aging mother, now cared for full-time by his sister, suffering from declining memory and health problems.

Ellison struggles to get his books published because, as his agent repeatedly explains to him, publishing houses do not believe his writing to be "black enough". Ellison is also confronted with the success of a novel, We's Lives In Da Ghetto, by first-time writer Juanita Mae Jenkins. Despite Ellison's finding the book full of clichés and lazy stereotypes, it becomes a bestseller and makes Jenkins an instant critical darling. Ellison's sister is murdered, and he moves to DC to replace her as his mother's caregiver.

Frustrated with his job prospects in DC, Ellison sits down to write a "black" novel that will be palatable to the publishers. Using the assumed identity of a black convict named Stagg R. Leigh, Monk quickly composes a satirical response to Jenkins' text, based in part on Richard Wright's Native Son (1940). He calls his own novel My Pafology, before changing its title to simply Fuck.

Fuck is written in ten chapters, as a novel within a novel. The plot is an exaggerated story of a young black man who has four babies by four different women whom he abuses as he falls into a life of delinquency and crime. The dialogue is deliberately written in a style that relies heavily on African-American English and phonetic spellings that reflect that variety of English.

To Ellison's shock, his agent is able to quickly get a publishing deal for Fuck, earning him $600,000 in advance fees. The novel quickly becomes his bestselling work to date and gets optioned by a film producer for $3 million. Throughout the process of selling and optioning the film, Ellison fashions a persona as the convicted "author" Leigh in order to maintain his credibility.

In his personal life, his mother's mental health goes downhill. They take a "last vacation" to their weekend home on the Chesapeake, where Ellison briefly strikes up a relationship with a local woman. At the end of the novel, Ellison is on the judging committee for a major book prize, which is awarded to Fuck despite his objections. As Ellison approaches the stage to accept the award, he hallucinates the people he has known throughout his life and imagines himself looking in a mirror and seeing Leigh.

== Reception ==
=== Literary criticism ===
Gergely Vörös argues that the novel presents cultural expectations of black experience as a force that constrains and determines Ellison's experiences as a racialized person. Vörös writes that Erasure "enters into a dialogue with the dominant racial representations of the contemporary United States in the hope of deracialising the American imaginary". Irene Rose De Lilly provides a Freudian analysis of the novel, attempting to demonstrate that "Everett is, in fact, the two main characters he has created". Jennifer M. Wilks, in Diasporas, Cultures of Mobilities, ‘Race’ 3, places Erasure within broader discussions of identity and iconography in Everett's fiction, noting how the novel "blurs the lines between real and imagined, waking and dream, in order to offer a retrospective critique of African American culture that also suggests innovative, provocative ways for rethinking questions of race and identity".

=== Book reviews ===
Darryl Pinckney's review in The Guardian focused on the dark comedy that Erasure represents, describing it as moving towards "bleakest comedy" and "sly work". He also described the book as a "skillful, extended parody of ghetto novels such as Sapphire's Push". Ready Steady Book focused on the novel being "full of anger" about the African-American literary establishment and said that the most redeeming elements of the plot come from a "moving portrait of a son coming to terms with his mother's life." Kirkus Reviews described the novel as: "More genuine and tender than much of Everett's previous work, but no less impressive intellectually: a high point in an already substantial literary career."

=== Awards and honors ===
- Erasure won the inaugural Hurston/Wright Legacy Award in 2002.
- In 2024, it was listed on The Atlantic's The Great American Novels list.
- It is listed #20 on The New York Times' 100 Best Books of the 21st Century list.

== Film adaptation ==
After receiving literary praise for the novel, Everett was initially reluctant to license the novel for adaptation. American filmmaker Cord Jefferson, however, presented a compelling case for an adaptation, and the changes to the plot and story in the script satisfied Everett.

After several years of production, the film adaption was released in 2023 under the title American Fiction, written and directed by Jefferson and starring Jeffrey Wright, Tracee Ellis Ross, Erika Alexander, Sterling K. Brown, and Leslie Uggams. The film won the Toronto International Film Festival People's Choice Award at the Toronto Film Festival that year. The film received five nominations at the 96th Academy Awards, including Best Picture and won Best Adapted Screenplay.
