= Upstream Color =

2013 science fiction film by Shane Carruth

- Directed by: Shane Carruth
- Written by: Shane Carruth
- Produced by: Shane Carruth
- Starring: Amy Seimetz; Shane Carruth
- Cinematography: Shane Carruth
- Edited by: Shane Carruth; David Lowery
- Music by: Shane Carruth
- Production company: ERBP
- Distributed by: ERBP; VHX
- Release dates: January 21, 2013 (Sundance); April 5, 2013 (US)
- Running time: 96 minutes
- Country: United States
- Language: English
- Budget: $50,000–100,000
- Box office: $584,881

Upstream Color is a 2013 American experimental science fiction film written, directed, produced by and starring Shane Carruth. The film is the second feature directed by Carruth, following his 2004 debut Primer. It also stars Amy Seimetz, Andrew Sensenig and Thiago Martins.

In the film, the behaviors of two people are unwittingly affected by a complex parasite that has a three-stage life cycle.

== Plot ==
The film begins with a man (mentioned in the credits as the "Thief") who seems to be harvesting a type of larva for the peculiar effects it has on the human mind when ingested.

At a club, Kris (Amy Seimetz) is tasered and kidnapped by the Thief. He makes her swallow the larva, which induces a sort of hypnotic susceptibility, causing an extremely suggestible mental state the Thief exploits. He uses an elaborate set of distractions, such as getting her to create a paper chain where each link features a transcription from the book Walden, to distract her while performing his mind control. He eventually manipulates her to liquidate her home equity, reveal to him a stash of valuable rare coins, and empty her bank account. Through hypnotic suggestion, Kris is prevented from consuming solid foods. She is allowed only to drink small amounts of water at regulated intervals, which she is compelled to perceive as extremely refreshing and delicious. Thief eventually releases Kris, who binges ravenously and falls asleep in soiled clothes in her home. She awakens to find several large worms visibly crawling under her skin. She unsuccessfully attempts to remove them with a kitchen knife.

Later, a pig farmer and avid field recorder—the "Sampler"—draws Kris to his farm using infrasonics. The Sampler silently sets up a transfusion through which he transfers a worm from Kris's body into that of a young pig. Kris then awakens in an abandoned SUV on the freeway with no memory of these recent events. Upon arriving at her disordered house, she quizzically notices blood on her sheets and floors and considers calling the police. She realizes she has no information to tell them and stops dialing. After cleaning up, she heads to work, where she is promptly fired for her unexplained absence. A trip to the grocery store reveals to Kris that her personal funds are gone.

A year later, Kris meets a man named Jeff (Shane Carruth) on a train and connects with him. They meet several times before finally spending the night with each other. Afterwards, they realize that they both have identical stitching scars from the aforementioned, forgotten, transfusions. They soon realize they had similar experiences; Jeff lost his job as a broker due to shifting company funds around to cover for money stolen from him and attributed the incident to drug abuse. At the same time, it is made clear to the audience that a parallel exists between the emotions Kris and Jeff have been feeling and two pigs, one of which is the host to Kris's parasite: Kris mistakenly believes herself to be pregnant at the same time her pig counterpart is actually pregnant. Upon consultation with a doctor, she is diagnosed with having had endometrial cancer that was successfully removed. The supposed cancer, she is told, is no longer a threat to her body, but it has rendered her infertile.

The Sampler finds that the pig containing Kris's worm has now given birth to piglets. He throws the piglets into a burlap sack and tosses them into a river. This event coincides with Jeff and Kris feeling an extreme sense of loss and frustration, and both act as if something terrible is happening to them; Jeff spontaneously picks a fight with two of his co-workers while Kris frantically searches as if she had lost something. The two, in their panicked state, reunite and travel to Kris's house, where they gather supplies, including a gun, and make camp in her bathroom's tub, expecting the worst. Meanwhile, the sack of piglets is seen rotting away and a blue substance bursts from the piglets' open wounds, filling the surrounding waters, from which orchids have emerged. The orchids eventually turn the same color blue and are collected by farmers, who sell the plants in the neighborhood where the thief operates.

These events seem to mark a change in the state of things. Kris and Jeff begin to remember each other's personal histories as their own. Jeff discovers Kris mumbling the text of Walden while swimming. It is while performing this ritual that Kris comes to sense things that the Sampler has sensed, and it is this moment that the two start to piece together what happened to them both. In a dreamlike sequence, Kris, Jeff, and the Sampler all sit down at a table in a bare, white room where Kris reveals to the Sampler that she is aware of him; the Sampler collapses from an apparent heart attack. The scene then cuts to a parallel shot at the pig farm, where Kris shoots and kills the collapsed Sampler. Kris and Jeff collect a box of written records detailing others who were similarly drugged; they summon these other victims to the farm by sending them copies of Walden. The farm is thereafter remodeled and the pigs are better cared for; as a result, no more pigs are drowned, the orchids in the river no longer turn blue, and the Thief is deprived of the larvae for his drug. The film ends with Kris cradling a baby pig, at peace.

== Cast ==
- Amy Seimetz as Kris
- Shane Carruth as Jeff
- Andrew Sensenig as The Sampler
- Thiago Martins as The Thief

== Production ==
In October 2011, it was revealed that Upstream Color would be Carruth's second feature, taking precedence over his science fiction film A Topiary. It was announced that Upstream Color was in the process of casting in Dallas, Texas, in preparation for a forty-day shoot, set to begin in early November 2011 and end in late January 2012.

== Themes ==
In April 2013, io9 asked director Shane Carruth if the film's point regarded a return to nature. Carruth replied that the film explored breaking cycles:

"It's more about what those pigs are now embodying. I mean, there is a break of the cycle. These people that have been affected by this are now taking back ownership of the thing that they’re connected to...I don't believe that narrative works when it's trying to teach a lesson, or speak a factual truth. What it's good for is, an exploration of something that's commonplace and universal — maybe that's where the truth comes from."

Regarding the role of The Sampler, Carruth told io9: "So the idea that they would find this pig sampler, or this pig-farmer/sampler character, to be the culprit for all of their problems — when, in reality, we of the audience see [that], of the three people continuing this life cycle, the thief is definitely malicious, the orchid harvesters are definitely benign. It’s the sampler who is interesting, but not necessarily doing anything wrong. He is an observer. You can make a case for whether or not he's culpable, in being able to benefit from the observation..." Regarding the peace experienced by Kris at the end of the film, Carruth told io9: "By that time, we know that she can’t have children. So whatever it is that she is peaceful with there [in the pig farm] is not going to return the affection she might have for it. It is always going to be that broken state of things, regardless of what that moment is like right then."

== Release ==
The film premiered on January 21, 2013, at the 2013 Sundance Film Festival, followed by a theatrical release in the United States on April 5, 2013, self-distributed by Carruth. Carruth explained: "Everything about the choice to do the distribution is about contextualizing" the movie. The film was shown at South by Southwest on March 8, 2013.

The film was released on Netflix on May 7, 2013.

== Reception and legacy ==
=== Critical response ===
Upstream Color received widespread critical acclaim. After its premiere, Keith Kimbell wrote that "most critics couldn't stop talking about it". Mark Olsen, for the Los Angeles Times, wrote: "For a time, Upstream Color was trending higher on Twitter than Sundance itself." On Rotten Tomatoes, the film has an 87% approval rating, based on 146 reviews, with an average rating of 8.00/10. The site's critical consensus reads: "As technically brilliant as it is narratively abstract, Upstream Color represents experimental American cinema at its finest -- and reaffirms Shane Carruth as a talent to watch." On Metacritic, the film has a score of 81 out of 100 based on 27 reviews, indicating "universal acclaim".

Sam Adams of The A.V. Club gave the movie an "A", and wrote: "Having the movie wash over me was one of the most transcendent experiences of my moviegoing life". Adams added: "It's utterly perplexing, and heart-stoppingly beautiful, quite literally overwhelming", comparing parts of the movie with Terrence Malick's The Tree of Life (2011). That publication later featured a full review by Scott Tobias giving it the same rating, summing up his piece: "It might be fair to argue that the resonances of Upstream Color are too obscure and internal—many viewers have and will be baffled by it—but it’s the type of art that inspires curiosity and obsession, like some beautiful object whose meaning remains tantalizingly out of reach". In her review for The New York Times, Manohla Dargis also notices Malick's deep influence on Carruth, stating that it is "evident in Mr. Carruth’s emphasis on the natural world; his use of Walden; the hushed voices and many images, including some time-lapse photography of a dead pig decaying underwater, which registers as the catastrophic inverse of the time-lapse sequence of a seed sprouting underground in Days of Heaven", adding that "Mr. Malick’s influence also extends to shots of Kris and Jeff walking, whispering and touching that are not moored in a specific time but could be from the past, present or future. In these Malick Moments, time becomes as circular as the rising and setting of the sun."

Olsen of the Los Angeles Times wrote: "With its densely layered, thematically rich storytelling, Upstream Color is in part about the mutual psychosis that can be an essential part of romance, the agreement of a shared madness. It's intense and hypnotically powerful, and a more intimate and moving film than Primer. Color is somehow at once emotionally direct, while narratively abstract." A reviewer who enthused about the score wrote that he "found the film itself to be a messy, story-less, meandering abstract drug trip, but I admire the filmmaker and performances."

Jeremy Kay of The Guardian thought the film "a baffling, opaque mess" and said that it "contains striking microscopic imagery, cute pigs and alarmingly aggressive foley work. It's meticulous, methodical and educated – but also extreme, and extremely pretentious", though his colleague Peter Bradshaw called it a "flawed, experimental, fascinating film". Philip French of The Observer said: "The minimal dialogue is gnomic, often inaudible; the settings suddenly change without any apparent consistency of purpose... Upstream Colour has the makings of a cult movie, though it's not a cult I feel inclined to join.".

Writing for Music Box Theatre 2013 Spring Calendar, film critic Mike D'Angelo concludes that "while Upstream Color has a fair amount of (purely functional) dialogue, it’s essentially a silent film, obsessed not just with color but with texture and movement and rhythm". He also adds that the "film is a study of damaged people in which both the damage and the method of recovery has been made productively strange, allowing Carruth to reclaim some potent ideas that have become clichés". D'Angelo further states that the film is "a dazzling exercise in pure form, with a cinematic syntax that’s confident and exacting yet still feels wildly spontaneous—part Kubrick, part Malick", concluding that the "most exciting aspect of Carruth’s movies, though, in the end, may be the immense respect they afford the viewer. Not only does he refuse to spoon-feed, in the tiresome manner of most Hollywood fare (and even a sizable percentage of indie films), but he continually credits you with the intelligence to infer cause from effect, presenting you with B and trusting that you’ll work out A, which remains firmly offscreen, on your own."

The Hollywood Reporter declared: "Carruth's is a cinema of impressions and technique, not overt meaning" and gave a positive review: "The experience of watching the film...is highly visceral and sensuous; the images possess a crystalline clarity that is exquisite, and they're dispersed in rapid rhythmic waves in a way that's especially mesmerizing during this first section." In the second third of the film, after Kris and Jeff meet, the film "veers in the direction of romance in which two people who have presumably been genetically re-engineered attempt to redefine themselves and see what kind of connection they can make with someone else and what that might mean, if anything. They both remember and don't remember things from the past and sometimes argue over whose memory is whose."

The Salt Lake Tribune reviewer wrote that the "head-scratching science-fiction drama, about people finding themselves connected to each other and a parasite's life cycle, is beautiful to watch and contemplate." Reviewer Christopher Kelly, who was among other reviewers in being reminded of The Tree of Life, described it as "a puzzlebox narrative involving (among other very strange things) worms that are harvested for psychotropic drugs; a pig farmer who composes music inspired by the emotional anguish of others; and a group of people who have been kidnapped and bilked out of thousands of dollars. All of this unfolds in free-associative fashion, with one scene barely seeming to connect to the next." He said that the movie "floats gorgeously from one passage to the next, building a mounting sense of anxiety and melancholy at each mysterious step along the way."

Similarly, The Miami Herald called it "a puzzle that may be impossible to solve", saying that Carruth's "mesmerizing use of imagery—of textures and sounds, of crisp lighting and radiant natural beauty—has a haunting, lyrical quality reminiscent of Terrence Malick... But he also injects some moments that are so horrific and squirm-inducing, they're downright Cronenbergian. Although its title suggests a sense of direction, Upstream Color defiantly eschews a traditionally linear narrative format; it moves ahead in time but in an elliptical, hypnotic way. And Carruth's rhythmic style of editing draws you in and keeps you hooked even when it may not be entirely clear what you're watching. He's technically meticulous but the results are dreamlike."

The Film School Rejects reviewer gave an A− grade; he praised the film's "ambitiously big and brave themes" and the "finely effective score."

The Dissolve rated Upstream Color #5 in its list of the top five films of 2013.

The film was ranked #28 on Vanity Fair's list of 30 best films of the 2010s.

=== Awards ===
At the 2013 Sundance Film Festival, Upstream Color received the Special Jury Award for Sound Design, which was shared by Carruth, Johnny Marshall and Pete Horner. The Georgia Film Critics Association nominated Upstream Color for six awards, including Best Picture, Director, Actress, Original Screenplay, Cinematography and Score. In addition to her nomination for Best Actress, Amy Seimetz was also included in the Breakthrough Award category.

== Music ==
The soundtrack for the film features music composed by Carruth. It has been described by one reviewer as "a moving, symphonic and emotional score".
