= Dead center =

Dead center or dead centre may refer to:

== Engineering ==
- Dead centre (engineering), a position of a crank where the applied force is straight along its axis
- Dead center (tool), a type of lathe center used for accurately positioning a workpiece on an axis

== Music ==
- Dead Center (Game Theory album), a 1984 power pop album
- Dead Center (Eric Alexander album), a 2004 jazz album
- Dead Centre, a 2016 EP by Australian rapper and poet Omar Musa

== Other media ==
- deadCENTER Film Festival, an Oklahoma film festival established in 2001
- "Dead Center", a 1954 science fiction novelette by Judith Merril
- Dead Center, a 1993 film directed by Steve Carver
- The Dead Center, a 2018 film starring Shane Carruth
- Dead Center, a campaign in the 2009 video game Left 4 Dead 2
- "Top Dead Center", a column by Kevin Cameron in Cycle World magazine
