= Niels Mueller =

American film director

- Born: 1961 (age 63–64); Milwaukee, Wisconsin
- Occupation(s): Film director, screenwriter, film producer

Niels Mueller (born 1961) is an American film director, screenwriter, and film producer. His directorial debut film, The Assassination of Richard Nixon, screened at the 2004 Cannes Film Festival.

== Biography ==
Mueller was born and raised in Milwaukee, Wisconsin, and attended Tufts University, where he earned a BA. While an undergraduate, he collaborated with fellow student Gary Winick on a number of independent film projects. Mueller subsequently attended film school at UCLA where he earned an MFA. His most notable work remains The Assassination of Richard Nixon (2004), starring Sean Penn, which he directed and also co-wrote with Kevin Kennedy. Other writing projects include Tadpole (2002), which he co-wrote, 13 Going on 30 (2004), although he lost an initial writing credit on this latter film in a subsequent dispute arbitrated by the Writers Guild of America. A pilot he wrote with Kevin Kennedy, The Defenders, was picked up by CBS television for the fall 2010 season. The series, starring James Belushi and Jerry O'Connell, chronicled the adventures of two defense attorneys in Las Vegas.

== Filmography ==
=== Filmography ===
- Sweet Nothing (1995) - editor
- Tadpole (2002) - writer
- Swimfan (2002) - production consultant
- The Assassination of Richard Nixon (2004) - director/writer
- The Flock (2007) - co-producer
- Tracks (2009) - producer
- Jessica (2016) - executive producer
- Small Town Wisconsin (2020) - director

=== Television ===
- The Defenders (2010) - writer
