= Shane Carruth =

American film producer, actor, screenwriter (born 1972)

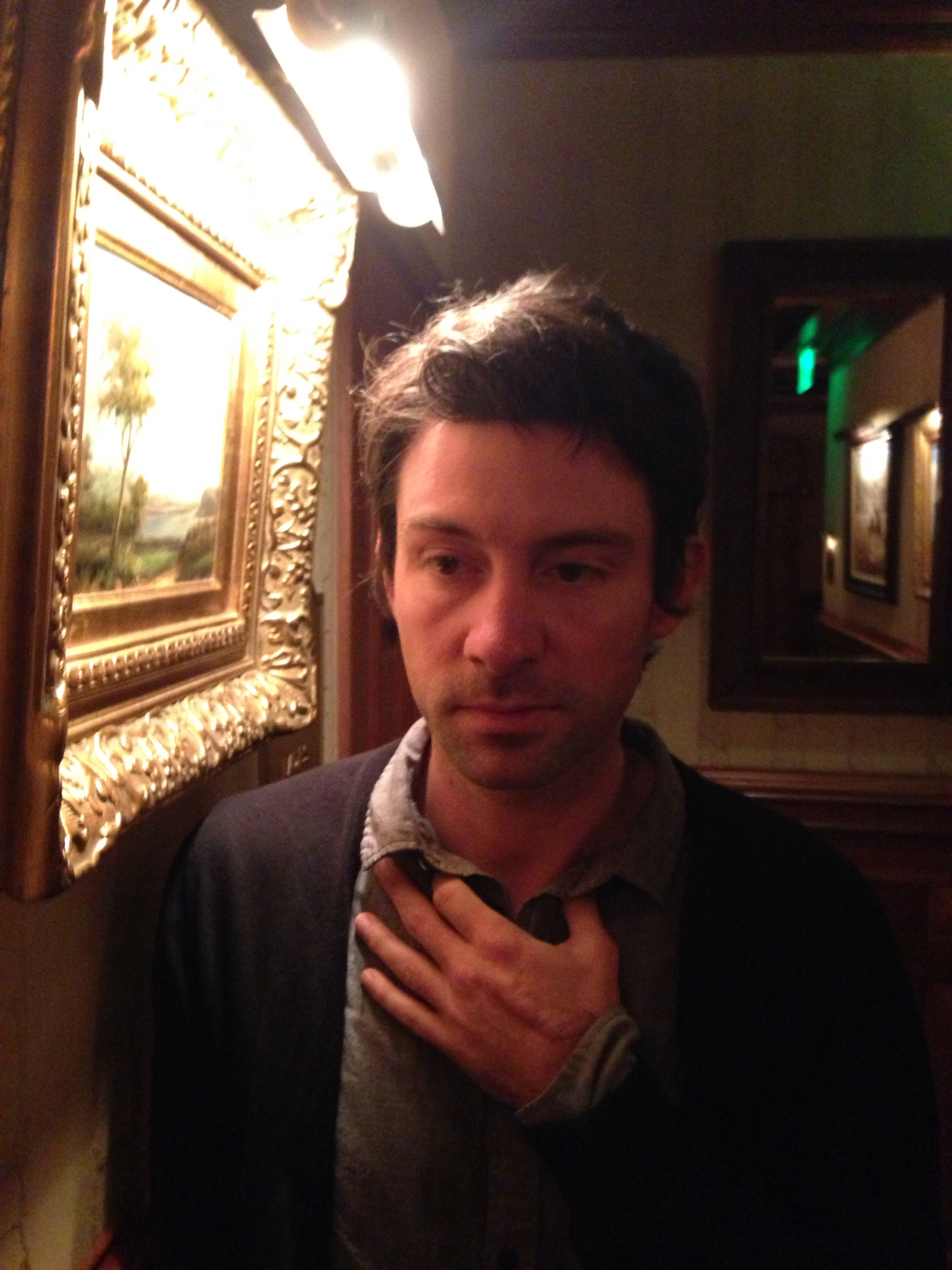
- Carruth at South by Southwest 2013
- Born: 1972 (age 53–54); Myrtle Beach, South Carolina, U.S.
- Education: Stephen F. Austin State University
- Occupations: Filmmaker; actor; composer
- Years active: 2004–present
- Partner: Amy Seimetz (2011–2018)

Shane Carruth (born 1972) is an American filmmaker, known for science-fiction features in which he has filled numerous jobs, including producer, director, screenwriter, composer, and actor. These include his prize-winning debut Primer (2004) and Upstream Color (2013). In reference to Carruth's unusual filmmaking technique, director Steven Soderbergh described him as "the illegitimate offspring of David Lynch and James Cameron."

== Early life ==
Carruth was born in Myrtle Beach, South Carolina in 1972. He attended Stephen F. Austin State University as a mathematics major. Before becoming a filmmaker, he worked as a developer of flight-simulation software.

== Career ==
=== Primer ===
For his independent film Primer, Carruth wrote, directed, produced, and performed one of the two main roles; he also composed the score. The film was honored at the 2004 Sundance Film Festival with the Grand Jury Prize and the Alfred P. Sloan Award. Carruth, a former software engineer with an undergraduate degree in mathematics, used his technical knowledge extensively on the project.

=== Upstream Color ===
On January 21, 2013, Carruth premiered his film Upstream Color at the 2013 Sundance Film Festival in the U.S. Dramatic Competition category. Carruth, Johnny Marshall, and Pete Horner won the U.S. Dramatic Special Jury Award for Sound Design for the film. Keith Kimbell wrote that it was the "most anticipated (and most difficult to describe) film in competition", and "most critics couldn't stop talking about it". The film was released via VHX on April 5, 2013. Some of Carruth's music from Upstream Color was featured in the 2016 documentary Tickled.

=== Unrealized work ===
In 2009, David Sullivan, one of the leads in Primer, tweeted that "Shane Carruth's next project, A Topiary, is in the early stages of pre-production". Filmmaker Rian Johnson tweeted that it would feature a "mind-blowing sci-fi script." In 2010, several news sources reported that A Topiary was in the works and that the script had been written. There was already a website for the movie which, according to Carruth in an interview to io9, "The website for now is just a place mark as financing has yet to be completed. I'm cautiously optimistic that this can happen soon and couldn't be happier with the filmmakers that have committed to the project so far." However, the film (which Entertainment Weekly described as "a sci-fi epic about a group of kids who build a giant, animal-like creature") stalled, and in early 2013, Carruth told EW that it was "the thing I basically wasted my whole life on." Carruth no longer pursues the project; some VFX test footage of the film is visible in Upstream Color in a scene when a character is examining the video for technical flaws.

In 2014, Carruth announced a new film, The Modern Ocean, based on international shipping and the lives of those involved. On August 12, 2015, it was reported that the film was in pre-production, and its ensemble cast was announced in November 2015; it would include Jeff Goldblum, Anne Hathaway, Keanu Reeves, Tom Holland, Daniel Radcliffe, Chloë Grace Moretz, Asa Butterfield, and Abraham Attah. In an interview in 2018, Carruth noted that the film is "not gonna happen anytime soon". Irrfan Khan was also scheduled to star as the lead captain of the ship, before his death on April 29, 2020. On June 17, 2020, Carruth posted the entire script for The Modern Ocean on Twitter, along with some of the original score.

In 2019, in an interview Carruth claimed he was working on "a massive thing" and would leave the film industry once that project concludes.

=== Consulting ===
Carruth consulted on time-travel sequences for filmmaker Rian Johnson's Looper, though it was later revealed that those sequences were deemed too expensive to shoot.

=== Acting ===
In 2016 Carruth had a cameo in the movie Swiss Army Man, as a coroner. He also acted in the short films Everything & Everything & Everything (2014), We'll Find Something (2015) and Memory Box (2016).

In 2018, Carruth play the lead role in the psychological thriller The Dead Center about a hospital psychiatrist whose own sanity is pushed to the edge when a frightened amnesiac patient insists that he has died and brought something terrible back from the other side.

His last role as of November 2026 was in the sci-fi series Tales from the Loop, as the older version of the character Cole.

=== Editing ===
Carruth was credited as an assistant editor for A Ghost Story. Director David Lowery told IndieWire in a 2017 interview that Carruth helped him assemble footage and in making the film more non-linear.

== Personal life ==
In 2019, when asked about his religious beliefs, he stated that he was raised Christian, but fell away from it, before later saying that he still prays from time to time and finds some comfort from the Bible.

=== Legal issues ===
From 2011 to 2018, Carruth was in a relationship with Amy Seimetz. The couple became engaged in 2013. Seimetz obtained temporary restraining orders against Carruth in 2018 and a permanent restraining order in 2020, citing years of domestic and emotional abuse and harassment. Carruth has denied these allegations.

On January 13, 2022, Carruth was arrested at the home of another ex-girlfriend on allegations of domestic assault and vandalism. He was released four days later on a $50,000 bond. Los Angeles County District Attorney's Office did not file felony charges.

== Filmography ==
| Year | Title | Director | Producer | Writer | Composer | Editor | Actor | Notes |
|---|---|---|---|---|---|---|---|---|
| 2004 | Primer | Yes | Yes | Yes | Yes | Yes | Yes | Also production designer, sound designer and casting director |
| 2013 | Upstream Color | Yes | Yes | Yes | Yes | Yes | Yes | Also cinematographer and camera operator |
| 2018 | The Dead Center | No | Yes | No | No | No | Yes | |

=== Television ===
| Year | Title | Director | Composer | Notes |
|---|---|---|---|---|
| 2016 | The Girlfriend Experience | No | Yes | 13 episodes |
| 2017 | Breakthrough | Yes | No | Episode "Predicting the Future" |

=== Acting roles ===
| Year | Title | Role | Notes |
|---|---|---|---|
| 2004 | Primer | Aaron | |
| 2013 | Upstream Color | Jeff | |
| 2014 | Everything & Everything & Everything | Morgan | Short film |
| 2015 | We'll Find Something | Steve | Short film |
| 2015 | Memory Box | The Man | Short film |
| 2016 | The Girlfriend Experience | Sam | TV series (1 episode) |
| 2016 | Swiss Army Man | Coroner | Cameo |
| 2018 | The Dead Center | Daniel Forrester | |
| 2020 | Tales from the Loop | Cole | TV series (2 episodes) |

=== Other credits ===
| Year | Title | Role |
|---|---|---|
| 2016 | The Divergent Series: Allegiant | Consultant |
| 2017 | A Ghost Story | Additional editor |
| 2020 | The Wanting Mare | Carruth was removed as executive producer after allegations of domestic violence surfaced. |

== Awards and nominations ==
| Year | Award | Category | Film | Result |
|---|---|---|---|---|
| 2004 | Sundance Film Festival | Grand Jury Prize | Primer | Won |
| 2004 | Sundance Film Festival | Alfred P. Sloan Prize | Primer | Won |
| 2004 | Nantucket Film Festival | Best Writer/Director | Primer | Won |
| 2004 | Gotham Awards | Best Feature | Primer | Nominated |
| 2004 | Sitges Film Festival | Best Film | Primer | Nominated |
| 2005 | London International Festival of Science Fiction and Fantastic Film | Best Feature | Primer | Won |
| 2005 | Independent Spirit Awards | Best Feature | Primer | Nominated |
| 2005 | Independent Spirit Awards | Best Director | Primer | Nominated |
| 2005 | Independent Spirit Awards | Best First Screenplay | Primer | Nominated |
| 2005 | Independent Spirit Awards | Best Actor in a Debut Performance (David Sullivan) | Primer | Nominated |
| 2005 | Fantasporto | International Fantasy Film Award | Primer | Nominated |
| 2013 | Sundance Film Festival | U.S. Dramatic Special Jury Award for Sound Design | Upstream Color | Won |
| 2013 | Sundance Film Festival | Grand Jury Prize – Dramatic | Upstream Color | Nominated |
| 2013 | Sitges Film Festival | Best Directorial Revelation | Upstream Color | Won |
| 2013 | Sitges Film Festival | Best Motion Picture | Upstream Color | Nominated |
| 2013 | Los Angeles Film Critics Association | Best Editing | Upstream Color | Second place |
| 2013 | Independent Spirit Awards | Best Director | Upstream Color | Nominated |
| 2013 | Independent Spirit Awards | Best Editing | Upstream Color | Nominated |
| 2013 | Gotham Awards | Best Film | Upstream Color | Nominated |
| 2013 | Gotham Awards | Best Actress (Amy Seimetz) | Upstream Color | Nominated |
| 2013 | Camerimage | Best Cinematography Debut | Upstream Color | Nominated |
| 2013 | Chicago Film Critics Association | Best Editing | Upstream Color | Nominated |
| 2013 | Dublin Film Critics' Circle | Best Director | Upstream Color | Nominated |
| 2013 | Village Voice Film Poll | Best Film | Upstream Color | Nominated |
| 2013 | Village Voice Film Poll | Best Director | Upstream Color | Nominated |
| 2013 | SXSW Film Festival | Festival Favorites | Upstream Color | Nominated |
| 2014 | Australian Film Critics Association | Best International Film (English Language) | Upstream Color | Nominated |
| 2014 | Central Ohio Film Critics Association | Best Picture | Upstream Color | Nominated |
| 2014 | Central Ohio Film Critics Association | Best Cinematography | Upstream Color | Nominated |
| 2014 | Chlotrudis Award | Best Cinematography | Upstream Color | Nominated |
| 2014 | Lost Weekend | Best Visuals | Upstream Color | Nominated |
| 2014 | Georgia Film Critics Association | Breakthrough (Amy Seimetz) | Upstream Color | Nominated |
| 2014 | Georgia Film Critics Association | Best Picture | Upstream Color | Nominated |
| 2014 | Georgia Film Critics Association | Best Original Score | Upstream Color | Nominated |
| 2014 | Georgia Film Critics Association | Best Director | Upstream Color | Nominated |
| 2014 | Georgia Film Critics Association | Best Actress (Amy Seimetz) | Upstream Color | Nominated |
| 2014 | Georgia Film Critics Association | Best Original Screenplay | Upstream Color | Nominated |
| 2014 | Georgia Film Critics Association | Best Cinematography | Upstream Color | Nominated |
| 2014 | London Film Critics' Circle | Technical Achievement of the Year (Johnny Marshall) | Upstream Color | Nominated |
