= American Fiction (film) =

2023 film by Cord Jefferson

- Theatrical release poster
- Directed by: Cord Jefferson
- Screenplay by: Cord Jefferson
- Based on: Erasure by Percival Everett
- Produced by: Ben LeClair; Nikos Karamigios; Cord Jefferson; Jermaine Johnson
- Starring: Jeffrey Wright; Tracee Ellis Ross; John Ortiz; Erika Alexander; Leslie Uggams; Adam Brody; Issa Rae; Sterling K. Brown
- Cinematography: Cristina Dunlap
- Edited by: Hilda Rasula
- Music by: Laura Karpman
- Production companies: MRC; T-Street; Almost Infinite; 3 Arts Entertainment
- Distributed by: Orion Pictures (through Amazon MGM Studios)
- Release dates: September 8, 2023 (TIFF); December 15, 2023 (United States)
- Running time: 117 minutes
- Country: United States
- Language: English
- Budget: $10 million
- Box office: $23 million

American Fiction is a 2023 American comedy-drama film written and directed by Cord Jefferson in his feature directorial debut. Based on the 2001 novel Erasure by Percival Everett, it follows a frustrated African-American novelist-professor who writes an outlandish satire of stereotypical "black" books, only for it to be mistaken for serious literature and published to high sales and critical praise. The film stars Jeffrey Wright, Tracee Ellis Ross, Issa Rae, Sterling K. Brown, John Ortiz, Erika Alexander, Leslie Uggams, Adam Brody and Keith David.

The film premiered at the Toronto International Film Festival on September 8, 2023, where it won the People's Choice Award. It received a limited theatrical release by Amazon MGM Studios on December 15, 2023, with an expansion on December 22, 2023.

The film grossed $23 million and received numerous accolades. It was named one of the top 10 films of 2023 by the American Film Institute. It also received five nominations at the 96th Academy Awards, including Best Picture and Best Actor for Wright, with Jefferson winning Best Adapted Screenplay.

== Plot ==
Thelonious "Monk" Ellison is a Black elite writer and professor living in Los Angeles. His novels receive academic praise but sell poorly, and his publishers reject his latest manuscript for not being "Black" enough. His college superiors place him on temporary leave due to his brashness with students over racial issues and suggest that he attend a literary seminar in his hometown of Boston. His panel at the seminar is sparsely attended, in contrast to a packed room for an interview with Sintara Golden, whose bestselling novel We's Lives in Da Ghetto shamelessly panders to Black stereotypes.

In Boston, Monk has dinner with his mother Agnes, who shows signs of Alzheimer's disease, and his sister Lisa, a physician. While having drinks with Monk, Lisa suffers a fatal heart attack. Their estranged brother Cliff, a plastic surgeon, attends Lisa's funeral. Newly divorced and out of the closet, Cliff engages in frequent drug use and casual sex. Monk meets Coraline, a lawyer living across the street from his mother's beach house and begins dating her.

Frustrated by the costs of care for his mother and resenting Sintara's success, Monk writes My Pafology, a fake memoir novel mocking the literary stereotypes expected from Black writers: melodramatic plots, deadbeat dads, gang violence, and drugs. After submitting it to publishers out of contempt, he is shocked to be offered a $750,000 advance, which he reluctantly accepts to pay for his mother's care. During a call with a prospective publisher, his agent Arthur improvises a cover story that "Stagg R. Leigh", the pseudonym Monk adopted for the novel, is a wanted fugitive. As "Stagg", Monk is offered a movie deal from film producer Wiley Valdespino. In response to patronizing comments by the publishing executives, Monk tries to sabotage the deal by demanding the title be changed to Fuck, but the publishers concede to his ultimatum. Monk is invited to help judge the New England Book Association's Literary Award as part of a "diversity push" and he reluctantly accepts. Monk is surprised to discover that Sintara is a fellow judge and that she shares many of his views.

Monk moves Agnes into an expensive assisted-living facility but she adapts poorly. Cliff briefly returns to visit, only to quickly leave when Agnes makes a homophobic remark. Fuck becomes a bestseller, much to Monk's shock and chagrin. Monk's family, friends, and the public remain unaware that he is Stagg, and the FBI contacts the publisher for information on Stagg's whereabouts.

Monk's publisher submits Fuck for the Literary Award, forcing him to judge his own novel. After learning that Coraline enjoyed reading Fuck, Monk argues with her over liking it and the two break up. The panel's white judges rave over Fuck, though Sintara deems the subject matter "pandering". Away from the other judges, Monk agrees but he argues that Sintara's book is "trauma porn" and inauthentic to her black middle-class background. Sintara counters that she researched her book by interviewing voiceless people and was giving the market what it wants.

On the wedding day of Monk's family housekeeper Lorraine, he finds Cliff living in Agnes's beach house with a pair of strange men, but Lorraine is happy to have him attend the wedding. At the reception, Monk and Cliff discuss the impact of their father's suicide, with Cliff encouraging Monk to let people love "all of him".

At the awards ceremony, Fuck is announced as the winner. Monk goes onstage and says he has a confession to make. The film cuts to black, and the events shown are revealed to have been Monk's screenplay based on his experiences, written for Wiley's production company as an alternative to the Fuck film adaptation. In reality, Monk quietly left the ceremony and is still estranged from Coraline. Wiley likes the screenplay but asks Monk to change the ambiguous ending.

Monk proposes an ending with him running away from the ceremony to apologize to Coraline, but Wiley says it feels too much like a romantic comedy. Monk then suggests one where police, believing Monk to be a wanted criminal, fatally shoot him at the ceremony. Much to Monk's dismay, Wiley loves it and the film moves into production. Monk drives away with Cliff after he and one of Wiley's actors, playing a plantation slave, acknowledge each other.

== Cast ==
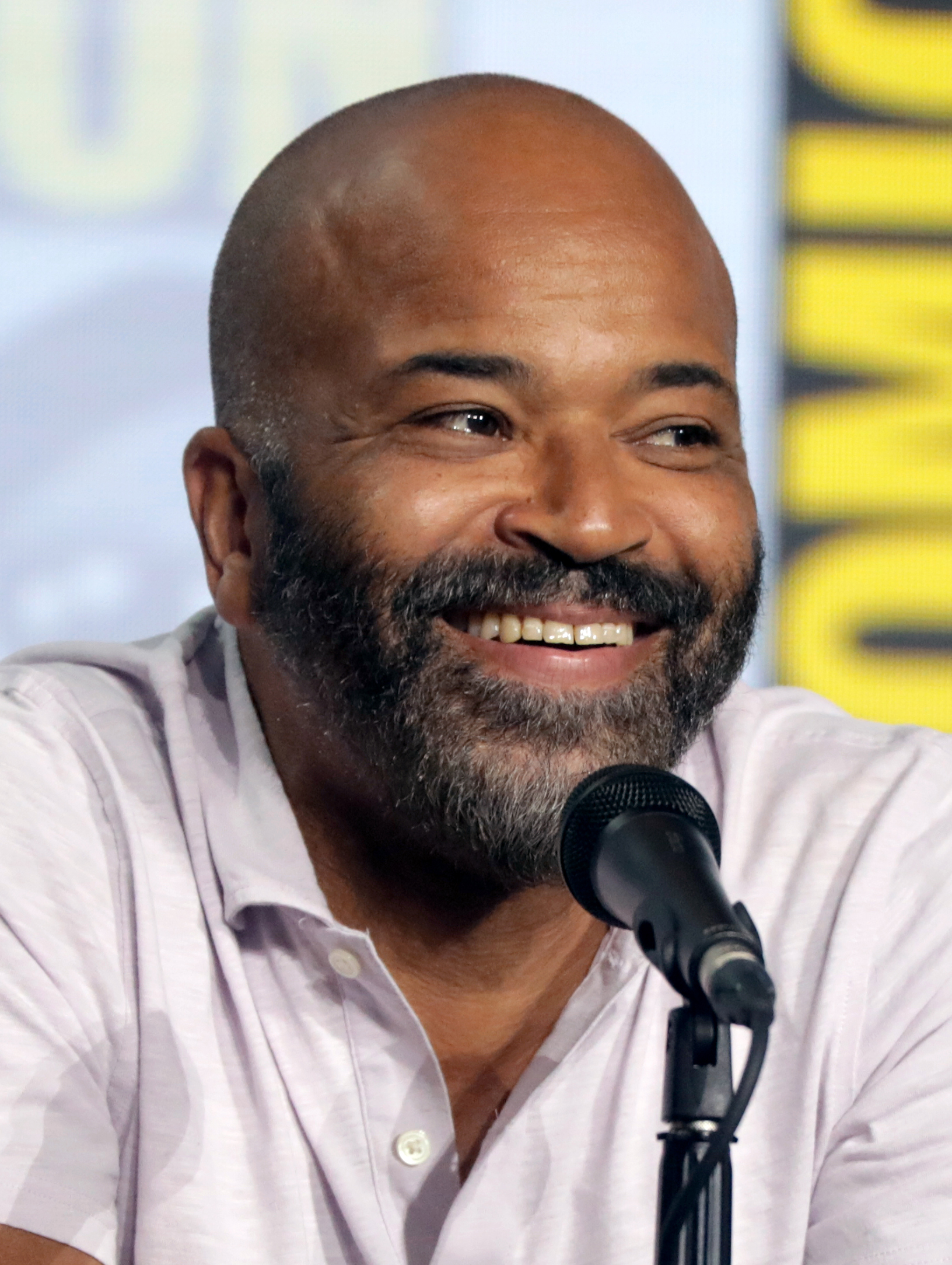
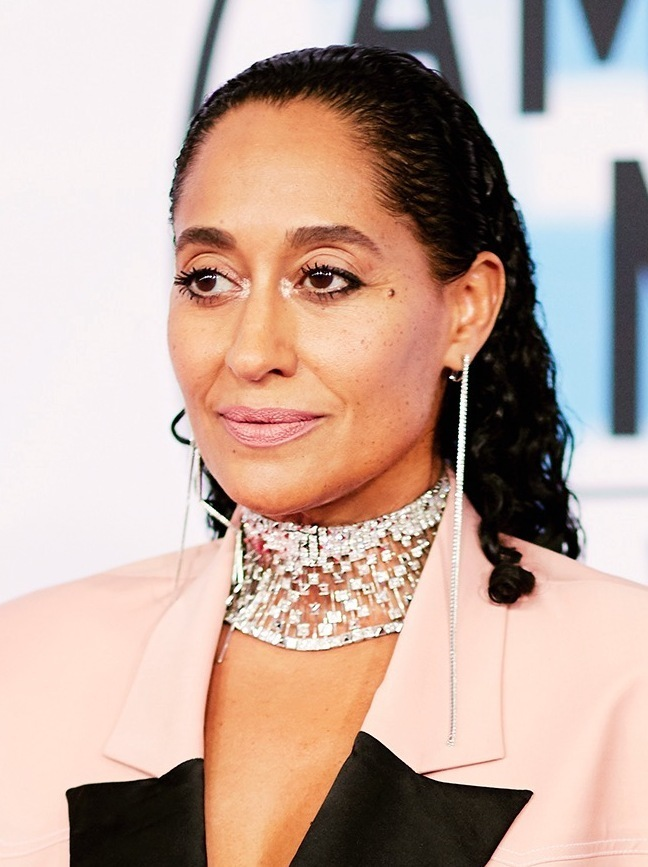
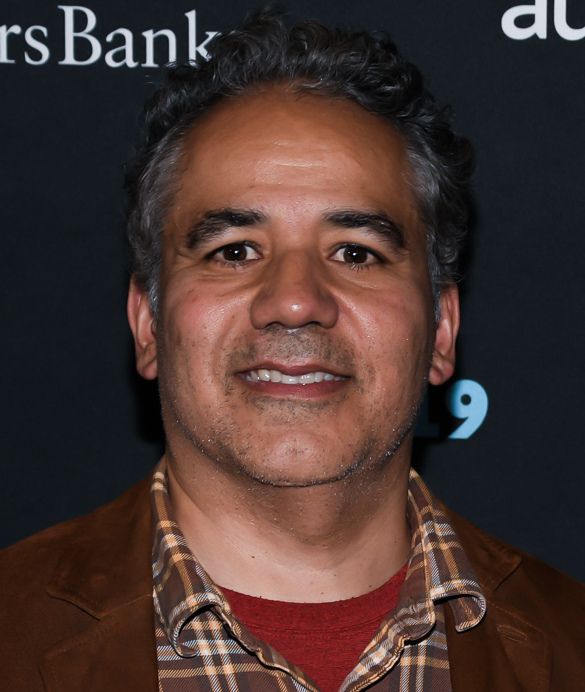
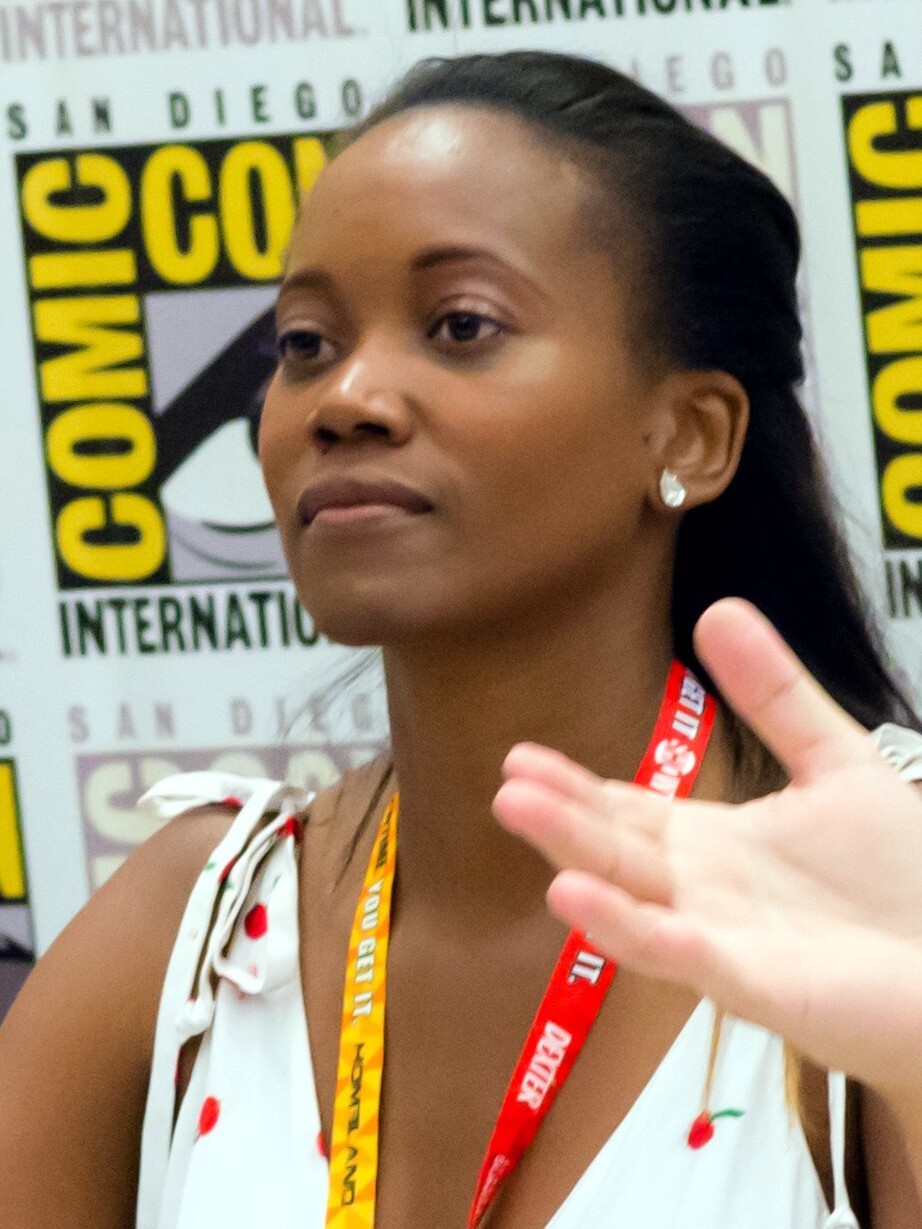
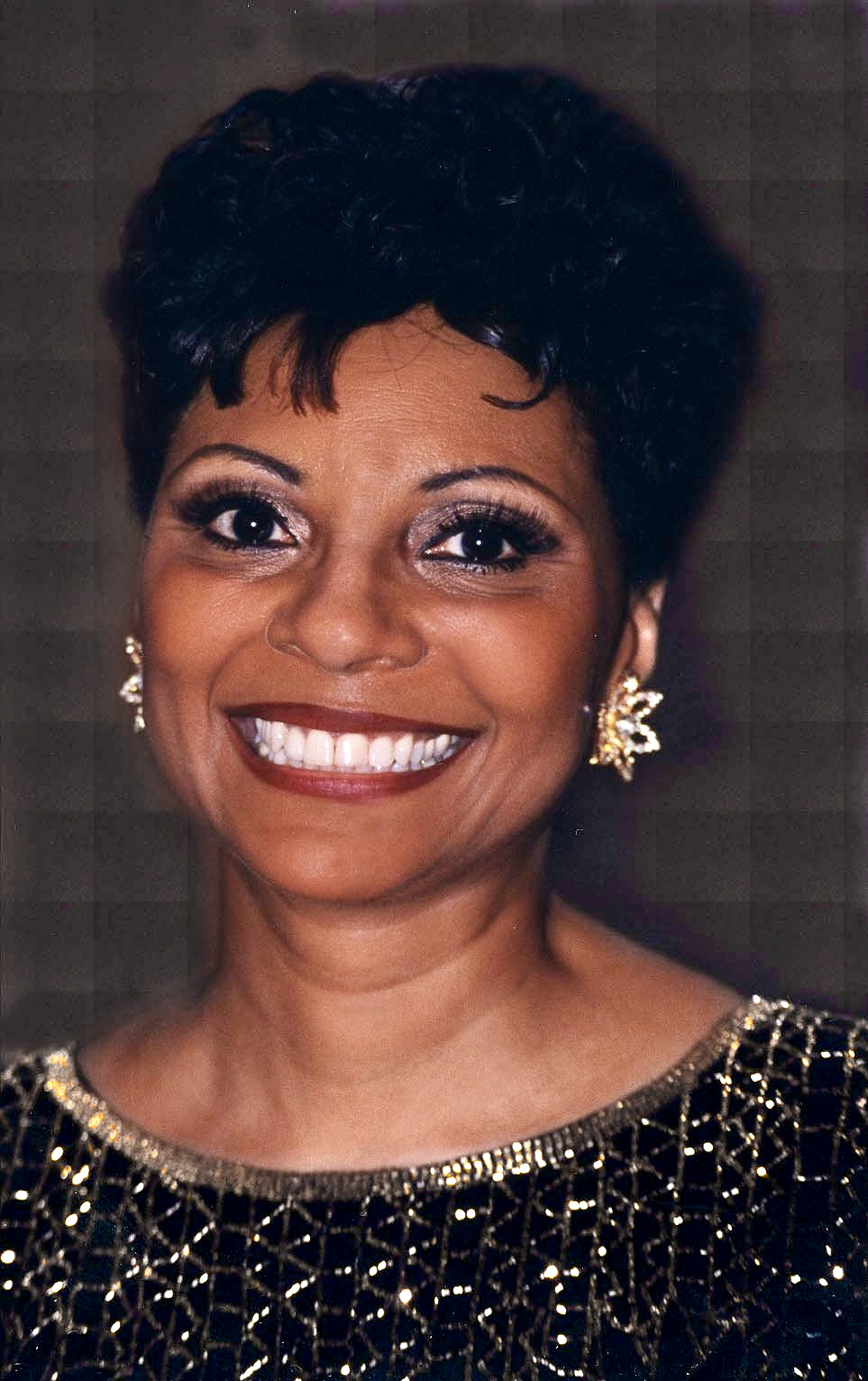
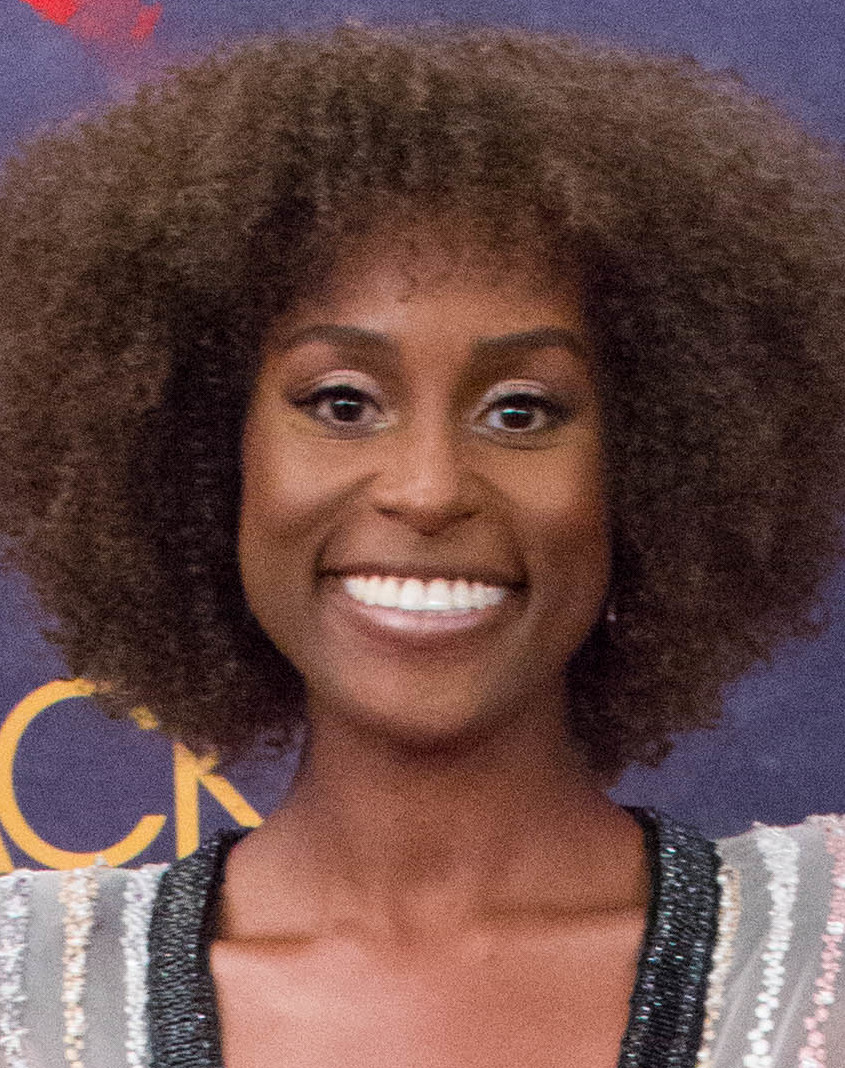
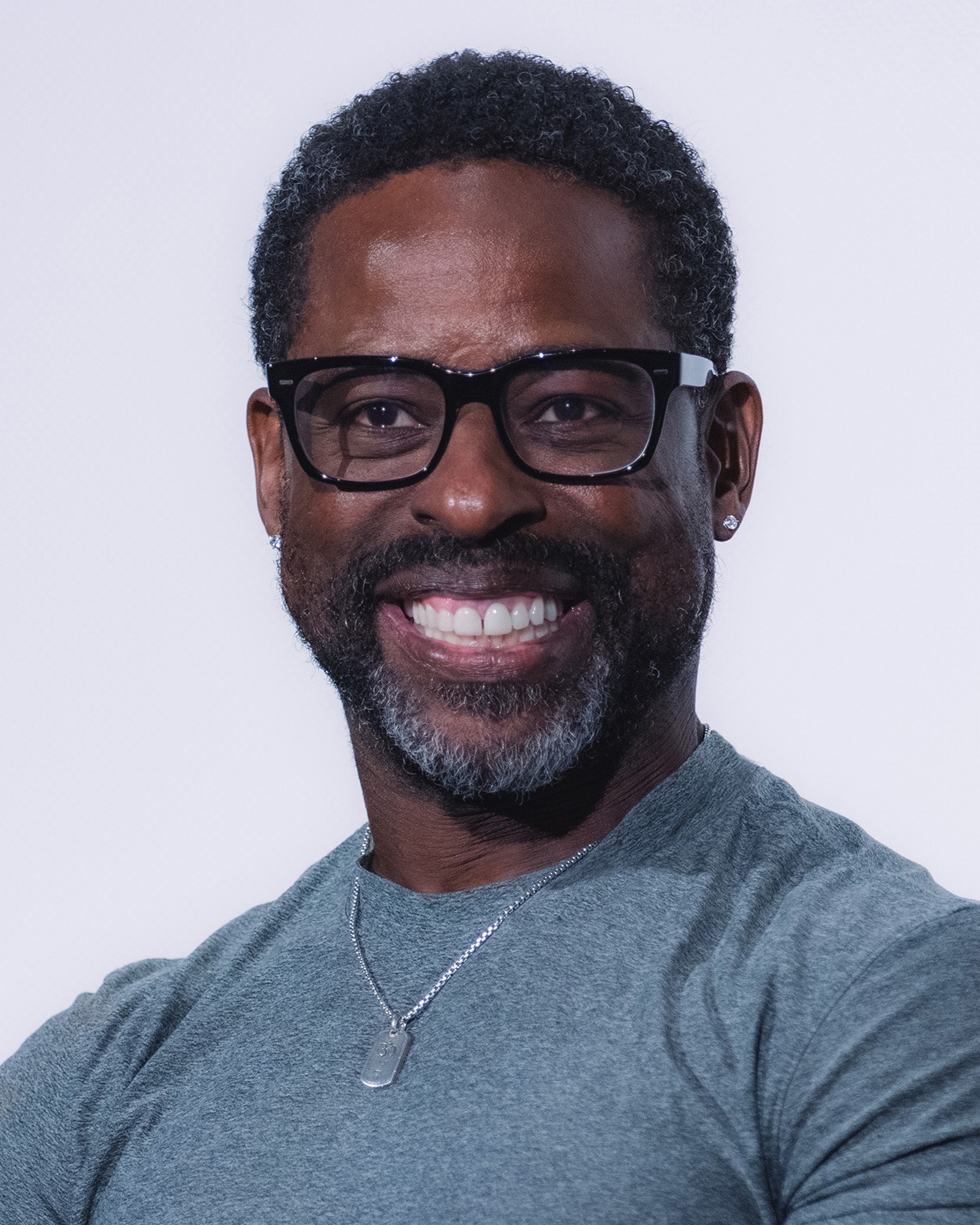
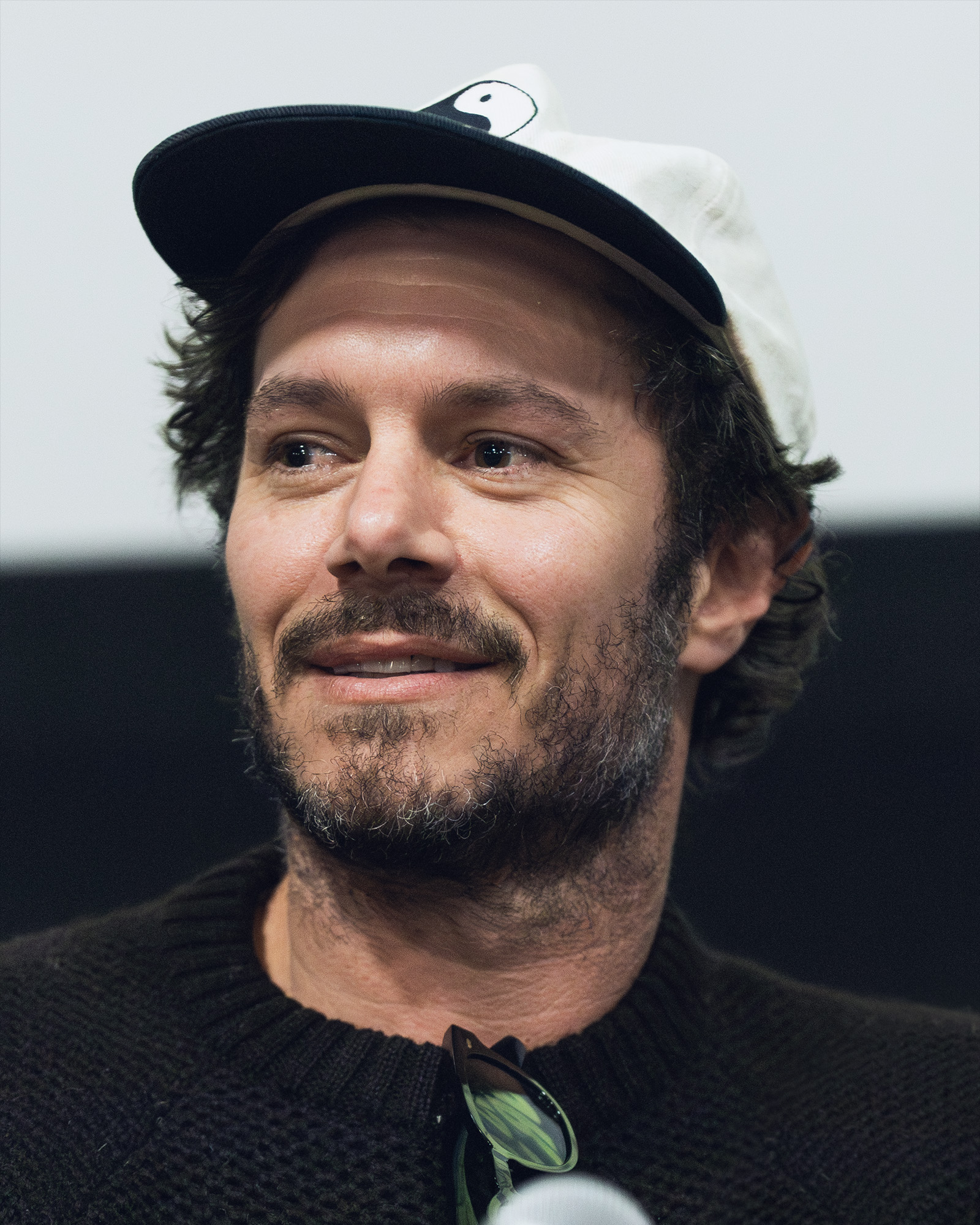
- Top row: (left to right) Jeffrey Wright, Tracee Ellis Ross, John Ortiz and Erika Alexander
- Bottom row: (left to right) Leslie Uggams, Issa Rae, Sterling K. Brown and Adam Brody
- Jeffrey Wright as Dr. Thelonious "Monk" Ellison, a writer and professor of literature, as well as brother to Lisa and Cliff. Monk has mild success as a writer until he satirically writes Fuck under the alias "Stagg R. Leigh".
- Tracee Ellis Ross as Dr. Lisa Ellison, a divorced medical doctor and sister to Monk and Cliff
- Issa Rae as Sintara Golden, a black author who has achieved popularity for her new book, We’s Lives In Da Ghetto
- Sterling K. Brown as Dr. Clifford "Cliff" Ellison, a plastic surgeon and brother to Monk and Lisa, who has recently come out as a gay man
- John Ortiz as Arthur, Monk’s agent
- Erika Alexander as Coraline, a public defender who is Agnes's neighbor and Monk’s eventual girlfriend
- Leslie Uggams as Agnes Ellison, mother to Monk, Lisa, and Cliff, who begins to suffer from Alzheimer's disease
- Adam Brody as Wiley Valdespino, a movie producer interested in Fuck
- Keith David as Willy the Wonker, an imaginary character that Monk uses to visualize his dialogue for Fuck
- Okieriete Onaodowan as Van Go Jenkins, an imaginary character that Monk uses to visualize his dialogue for Fuck
- Myra Lucretia Taylor as Lorraine, family friend and caretaker for the Ellisons
- Raymond Anthony Thomas as Maynard, a security guard who strikes up a romance with Lorraine
- Miriam Shor as Paula Baderman
- Michael Cyril Creighton as John Bosco
- Patrick Fischler as Mandel
- Neal Lerner as Wilson Harnet
- J. C. MacKenzie as Carl Brunt
- Jenn Harris as Aileen Hoover
- Bates Wilder as Jon Daniel Sigmarsen
- Ryan Richard Doyle as Ned
- Skyler Wright as Brittany

== Production ==
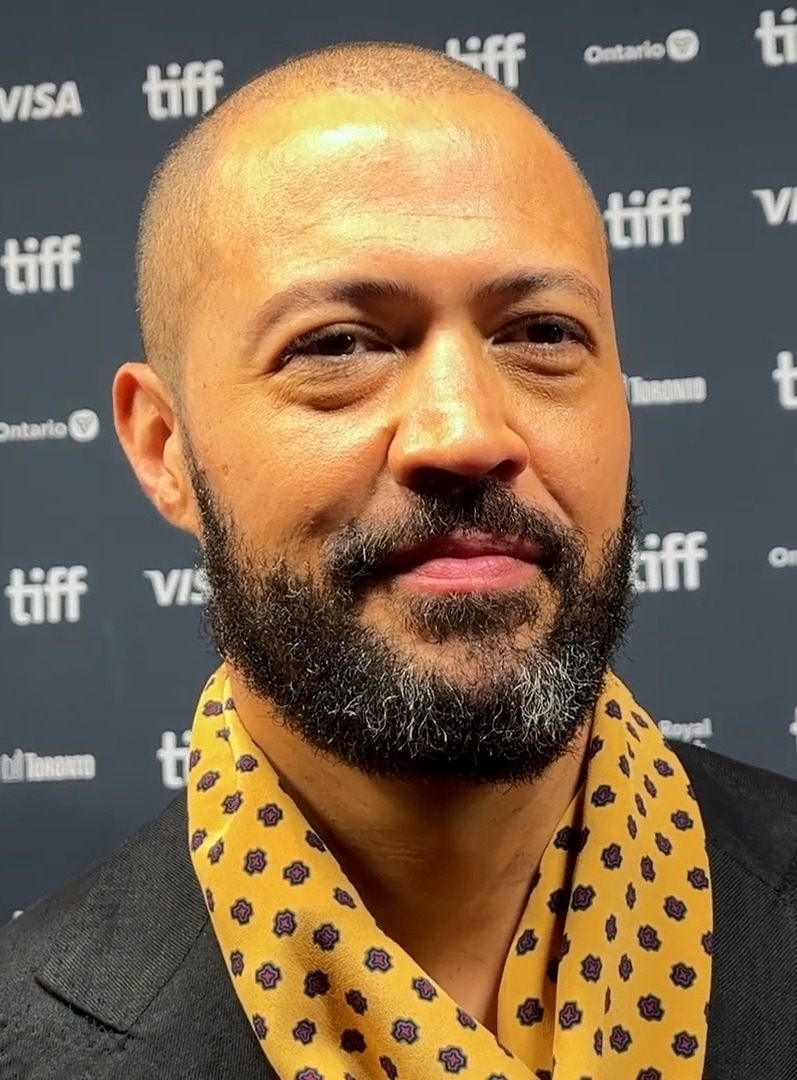
Cord Jefferson made his directorial debut with American Fiction.

In November 2022, Jeffrey Wright was cast in the untitled film, based on the 2001 novel Erasure by Percival Everett. Cord Jefferson would adapt the novel, with the film being his directorial debut. T-Street Productions and MRC Film produced the film. In December 2022, Tracee Ellis Ross, Erika Alexander, Leslie Uggams, Sterling K. Brown, Myra Lucretia Taylor, John Ortiz, Issa Rae, and Adam Brody joined the cast. The film wrapped production in Boston in early December, with COVID-19 safety precautions used on set. That month, MGM's Orion Pictures acquired the film's worldwide distribution rights. As a first-time filmmaker, Jefferson said he was such a fan of Wright's that he was nervous to give him feedback; it was producer Nikos Karamigios who, on the first day of shooting, encouraged him to be more assertive as a director. The film was shot in twenty-six days, with most scenes being completed with few (three to four) takes. In July 2023, with the announcement of its world premiere, the film's title was reported to be American Fiction. It is the first film from Orion to be distributed through Amazon MGM Studios Distribution, following Amazon's acquisition of MGM the year before, which also resulted in the 2021 MGM logo being added to the beginning of the film.

== Release ==
On September 8, 2023, American Fiction premiered at the Toronto International Film Festival, where it won the People's Choice Award. This was followed by a run in the festival circuit, culminating in its United States premiere at the Samuel Goldwyn Theater in Los Angeles on December 5, 2023. It had a limited theatrical release in the United States on December 15, 2023, with an expansion the following week (December 22, 2023). The film's release date had initially been set for November 3, 2023, before being changed to the later date. The film was released in the United Kingdom and Ireland by Curzon Film on February 2, 2024.

The film was released for digital platforms on February 6, 2024.

== Reception ==
=== Box office ===
American Fiction grossed $21.1 million in the United States and Canada, and $1.9 million in other territories, for a total worldwide gross of $23 million.

The film made $229,000 from seven theaters in its opening weekend, a per-venue average of $32,400. Following its five Oscar nominations, the film expanded from 852 theaters to 1,702 in its 7th week of release and made $2.9 million, an increase of 65% from the previous weekend, and a running total of $11.8 million. The following weekend it made $2.4 million.

=== Critical response ===
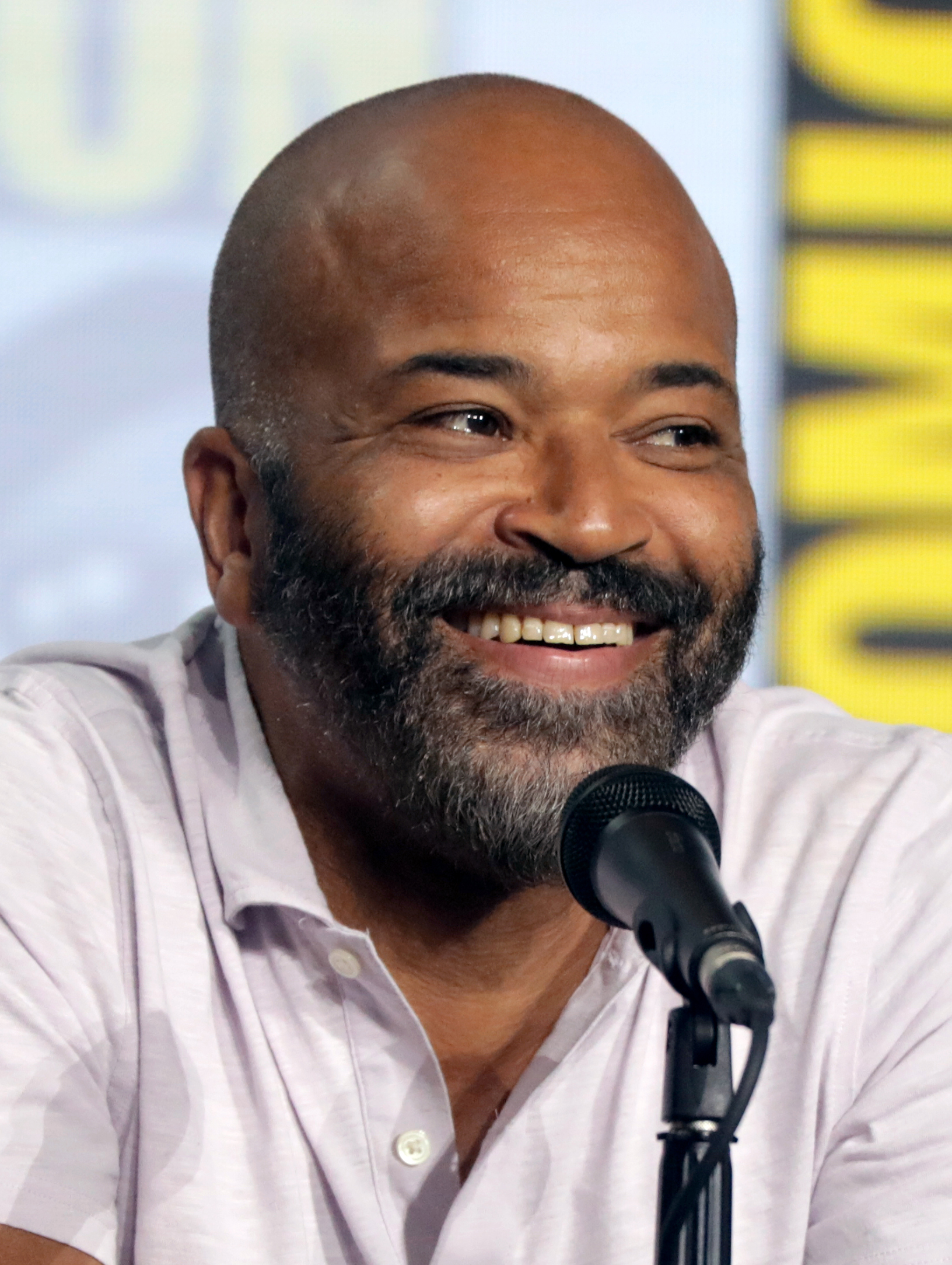
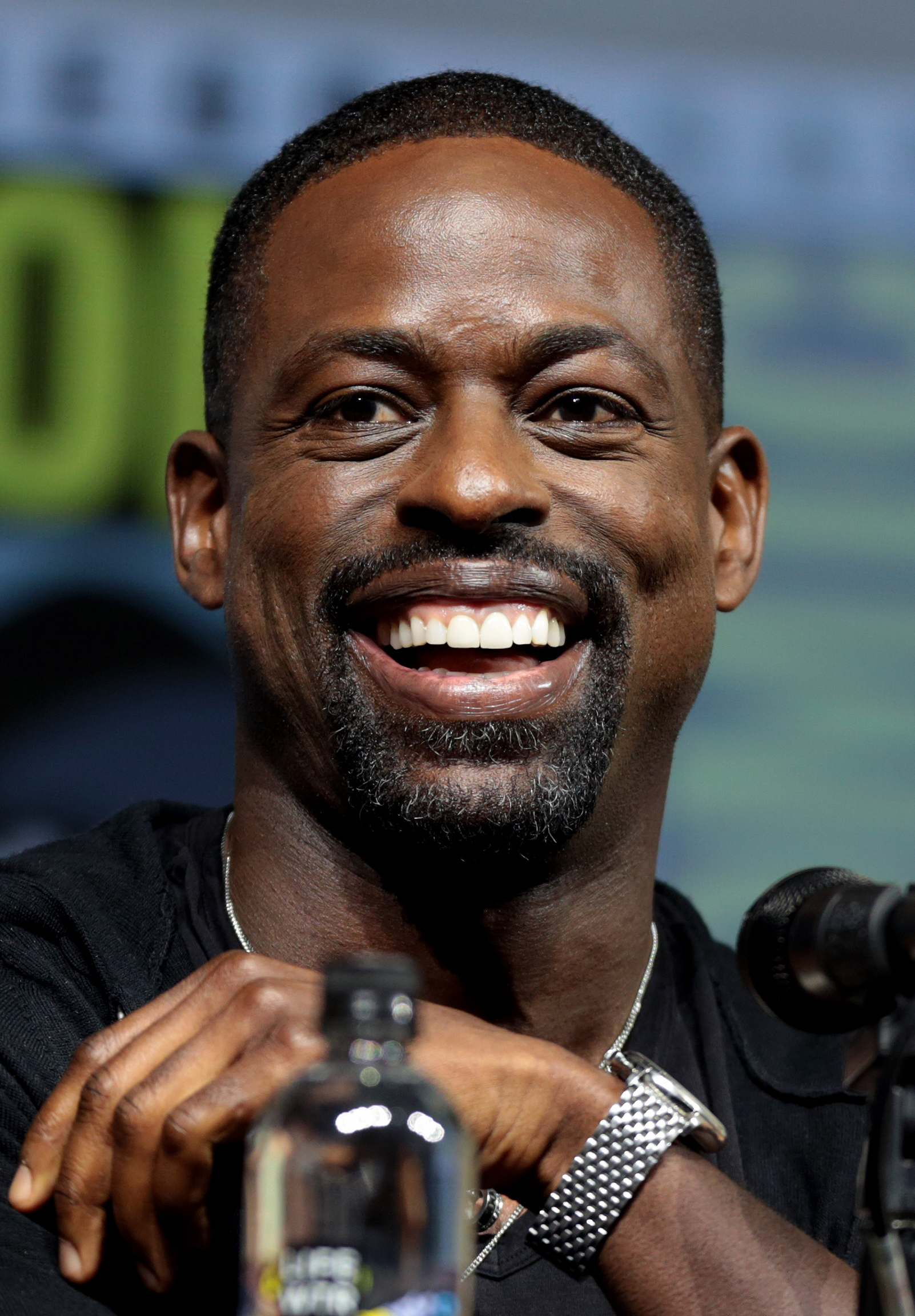
Jeffrey Wright and Sterling K. Brown garnered critical acclaim for their performances and earned Academy Award nominations for Best Actor and Best Supporting Actor.

On the review aggregator website Rotten Tomatoes, 93% of 294 critics' reviews are positive, with an average rating of 8.2/10. The website's consensus reads: "Jeffrey Wright and American Fiction will forever be inextricable thanks to the actor's committed approach to the pointedly humorous and insightful material." Metacritic, which uses a weighted average, assigned the film a score of 81 out of 100, based on 54 critics, indicating "universal acclaim". Audiences polled by PostTrak gave the film a 90% positive score, with 83% saying they would definitely recommend it.

In her review for The Hollywood Reporter, Lovia Gyarke wrote that "American Fiction is smart and, thanks to its fine cast, has genuine heart", commending Wright's "subtle physicality ... that contributes depth to his character", as well as "Uggams' increasingly somber performance as Agnes and Brown's delightful comedic turn". Peter Debruge for Variety, applauded Jefferson's writing prowess, likening him to Flannery O'Connor and Toni Morrison, whose works were both referenced in the film. To Debruge, Jefferson "trusts his audience to bring themselves to the material", which is "what makes reading American Fiction so rewarding." Peyton Robinson, writing for RogerEbert.com, highlighted Jefferson's writing as the key takeaway from this film, stating that his "attentive lens" to the film's "concept and themes is what will be remembered". Robinson goes on to identify the distinguishable legacy within the script, emphasizing Jefferson's "sharply pointed finger at the many institutional factors that keep [Black art], and its creators, restrained".

Sarah Lyall of The New York Times covered Jeffrey Wright in a feature about his career and his role in American Fiction, claiming that Wright's "exquisitely calibrated" performance demonstrates "[Wright's] ability to elevate any movie or TV show simply by appearing in it." Lyall goes on to celebrate that Wright "has a way of burrowing so deeply into his characters that he seems almost to be hiding in plain sight". Stephanie Zacharek at Time magazine also highlighted the lead star's performance, admiring that "Wright brings it all to life". Zacharek notes that Wright does so "not with thunderous, statement-making gestures, but with small ones that remind us how vulnerable Monk is", even amidst the protagonist's "own raging intelligence".

Filmmaker Gina Prince-Bythewood praised writer-director Cord Jefferson, stating that an artist's first work should tell the world who they are and Jefferson "has screamed into a bullhorn. Bold, chaotic, unflinching, personal. Cord has channeled his creative truths into a searing indictment of biased norms." Other filmmakers, including Rachel Morrison and Paul Schrader, also praised the film.

=== Accolades ===
The American Film Institute placed American Fiction as one of its top 10 films of 2023, praising Jefferson's writing as "the arrival of a powerful voice in American film", Wright's "triumphant" performance, and the ensemble cast.

Award	Date of Ceremony	Category	Recipient(s)	Result	Ref.
Toronto International Film Festival	September 17, 2023	People's Choice Award	American Fiction	Won	
Heartland International Film Festival	October 15, 2023	Humor & Humanity Award	Cord Jefferson	Won	
Mill Valley Film Festival	October 16, 2023	U.S. Cinema	Cord Jefferson	Won (Note: Shared with Rustin.)	
Mill Valley Film Festival	October 16, 2023	Breakthrough Directing	Cord Jefferson	Won	
San Diego International Film Festival	October 21, 2023	Best Gala Film	American Fiction	Won	
Middleburg Film Festival	October 22, 2023	Audience Award for Narrative Film	American Fiction	Won	
Celebration of Cinema & Television	December 4, 2023	Visionary Award	Jeffrey Wright	Won	
Windsor International Film Festival	October 29, 2023	LIUNA People's Choice Award	American Fiction	Runner-up	
Virginia Film Festival	October 29, 2023	Programmers' Award – Narrative Feature	American Fiction	Won	
Virginia Film Festival	October 29, 2023	Breakthrough Director Award	Cord Jefferson	Won	
Savannah Film Festival	November 2, 2023	Audience Award	American Fiction	Runner-up	
Hollywood Music in Media Awards	November 15, 2023	Original Score — Feature Film	Laura Karpman	Nominated	
Gotham Independent Film Awards	November 27, 2023	Outstanding Lead Performance	Jeffrey Wright	Nominated	
American Film Institute Awards	December 7, 2023	Top 10 Films of the Year	American Fiction	Won (Note: This award does not have a single winner, but recognizes multiple films.)	
Washington D.C. Area Film Critics Association Awards	December 10, 2023	Best Feature	American Fiction	Won	
Washington D.C. Area Film Critics Association Awards	December 10, 2023	Best Actor	Jeffrey Wright	Nominated	
Washington D.C. Area Film Critics Association Awards	December 10, 2023	Best Supporting Actor	Sterling K. Brown	Nominated	
Washington D.C. Area Film Critics Association Awards	December 10, 2023	Best Adapted Screenplay	Cord Jefferson	Won	
Washington D.C. Area Film Critics Association Awards	December 10, 2023	Best Ensemble	American Fiction	Nominated	
Los Angeles Film Critics Association Awards	December 10, 2023	Best Leading Performance	Jeffrey Wright	Runner-up	
Boston Society of Film Critics Awards	December 10, 2023	Best New Filmmaker	Cord Jefferson	Runner-up (Note: Shared with A. V. Rockwell for A Thousand and One.)	
IndieWire Critics Poll	December 11, 2023	Best Performance	Jeffrey Wright	9th Place (Note: Tied with Greta Lee for Past Lives.)	
IndieWire Critics Poll	December 11, 2023	Best Screenplay	Cord Jefferson	5th Place	
IndieWire Critics Poll	December 11, 2023	Best First Feature	American Fiction	4th Place	
Chicago Film Critics Association Awards	December 12, 2023	Milos Stehlik Award for Breakthrough Filmmaker	Cord Jefferson	Nominated	
New York Film Critics Online Awards	December 15, 2023	Top 10 Films	American Fiction	Won	
Las Vegas Film Critics Society	December 13, 2023	Best Comedy	American Fiction	Nominated	
Las Vegas Film Critics Society	December 13, 2023	Best Actor	Jeffrey Wright	Nominated	
Las Vegas Film Critics Society	December 13, 2023	Best Adapted Screenplay	Cord Jefferson	Won	
Las Vegas Film Critics Society	December 13, 2023	Breakout Filmmaker	Cord Jefferson	Nominated	
St. Louis Film Critics Association	December 17, 2023	Best Film	American Fiction	Nominated	
St. Louis Film Critics Association	December 17, 2023	Best Comedy Film	American Fiction	Nominated	
St. Louis Film Critics Association	December 17, 2023	Best Actor	Jeffrey Wright	Nominated	
St. Louis Film Critics Association	December 17, 2023	Best Supporting Actor	Sterling K. Brown	Nominated	
St. Louis Film Critics Association	December 17, 2023	Best Adapted Screenplay	Cord Jefferson	runner-up	
Indiana Film Journalists Association	December 17, 2023	Best Film	American Fiction	Longlisted	
Indiana Film Journalists Association	December 17, 2023	Best Lead Performance	Jeffrey Wright	Nominated	
Indiana Film Journalists Association	December 17, 2023	Best Adapted Screenplay	Cord Jefferson	Nominated	
Indiana Film Journalists Association	December 17, 2023	Breakout of the Year	Cord Jefferson	Nominated	
Toronto Film Critics Association	December 17, 2023	Best First Feature	American Fiction	Runner-up (Note: Shared with Past Lives.)	
Southeastern Film Critics Association	December 18, 2023	Top 10 Films	American Fiction	7th Place	
Dallas–Fort Worth Film Critics Association	December 18, 2023	Top 10 Films of the Year	American Fiction	5th Place	
Dallas–Fort Worth Film Critics Association	December 18, 2023	Best Actor	Jeffrey Wright	4th Place	
Phoenix Film Critics Society	December 18, 2023	Top Ten Films of 2023	American Fiction	Won	
North Texas Film Critics Association	December 18, 2023	Best Picture	American Fiction	Nominated	
North Texas Film Critics Association	December 18, 2023	Best Director	Cord Jefferson	Nominated	
North Texas Film Critics Association	December 18, 2023	Best Actor	Jeffrey Wright	Nominated	
North Texas Film Critics Association	December 18, 2023	Best Screenplay	Cord Jefferson	Nominated	
San Diego Film Critics Society	December 19, 2023	Best Picture	American Fiction	Nominated	
San Diego Film Critics Society	December 19, 2023	Best Director	Cord Jefferson	Nominated	
San Diego Film Critics Society	December 19, 2023	Best Actor	Jeffrey Wright	Won	
San Diego Film Critics Society	December 19, 2023	Best Supporting Actor	Sterling K. Brown	Nominated	
San Diego Film Critics Society	December 19, 2023	Best Adapted Screenplay	Cord Jefferson and Percival Everett	Runner-up	
San Diego Film Critics Society	December 19, 2023	Best First Feature	Cord Jefferson	Won	
Black Film Critics Circle	December 20, 2023	Top Ten Films	American Fiction	1st Place	
Black Film Critics Circle	December 20, 2023	Best Actor	Jeffrey Wright	Won	
Black Film Critics Circle	December 20, 2023	Best Supporting Actor	Sterling K. Brown	Won	
Black Film Critics Circle	December 20, 2023	Best Adapted Screenplay	Cord Jefferson	Won (Note: Tied with Oppenheimer.)	
Black Film Critics Circle	December 20, 2023	Best Ensemble	American Fiction	Won	
Florida Film Critics Circle Awards	December 21, 2023	Best Adapted Screenplay	Cord Jefferson	Nominated	
Florida Film Critics Circle Awards	December 21, 2023	Best First Film	Cord Jefferson	Nominated	
Oklahoma Film Critics Circle	January 3, 2024	Top 10 Films	American Fiction	10th Place	
Alliance of Women Film Journalists	January 4, 2024	Best Film	American Fiction	Nominated	
Alliance of Women Film Journalists	January 4, 2024	Best Actor	Jeffrey Wright	Won	
Alliance of Women Film Journalists	January 4, 2024	Best Actor in a Supporting Role	Sterling K. Brown	Nominated	
Alliance of Women Film Journalists	January 4, 2024	Best Screenplay, Adapted	Cord Jefferson	Won	
Alliance of Women Film Journalists	January 4, 2024	Best Ensemble Cast – Casting Director	Jennifer Euston	Won	
Georgia Film Critics Association Awards	January 5, 2024	Best Picture	American Fiction	Nominated	
Georgia Film Critics Association Awards	January 5, 2024	Best Director	Cord Jefferson	Nominated	
Georgia Film Critics Association Awards	January 5, 2024	Best Actor	Jeffrey Wright	Runner-up	
Georgia Film Critics Association Awards	January 5, 2024	Best Supporting Actor	Sterling K. Brown	Nominated	
Georgia Film Critics Association Awards	January 5, 2024	Best Adapted Screenplay	Cord Jefferson	Runner-up	
Georgia Film Critics Association Awards	January 5, 2024	Best Ensemble	American Fiction	Nominated	
Greater Western New York Film Critics Association	January 6, 2024	Best Lead Actor	Jeffrey Wright	Nominated	
Greater Western New York Film Critics Association	January 6, 2024	Breakthrough Director	Cord Jefferson	Nominated	
Astra Film and Creative Arts Awards	January 6, 2024	Best Picture	American Fiction	Nominated	
Astra Film and Creative Arts Awards	January 6, 2024	Best Director	Cord Jefferson	Nominated	
Astra Film and Creative Arts Awards	January 6, 2024	Best Actor	Jeffrey Wright	Nominated	
Astra Film and Creative Arts Awards	January 6, 2024	Best Adapted Screenplay	Cord Jefferson	Won	
Astra Film and Creative Arts Awards	January 6, 2024	Best First Feature	Cord Jefferson	Nominated	
Astra Film and Creative Arts Awards	February 26, 2024	Best Casting	Jennifer Euston	Nominated	
National Society of Film Critics Awards	January 6, 2024	Best Actor	Jeffrey Wright	Runner-up (Note: Shared with Cillian Murphy for Oppenheimer)	
Golden Globe Awards	January 7, 2024	Best Motion Picture – Musical or Comedy	American Fiction	Nominated	
Golden Globe Awards	January 7, 2024	Best Actor – Motion Picture Musical or Comedy	Jeffrey Wright	Nominated	
Seattle Film Critics Society Awards	January 8, 2024	Best Picture of the Year	American Fiction	Nominated	
Seattle Film Critics Society Awards	January 8, 2024	Best Actor in a Leading Role	Jeffrey Wright	Won	
Seattle Film Critics Society Awards	January 8, 2024	Best Actor in a Supporting Role	Sterling K. Brown	Nominated	
Seattle Film Critics Society Awards	January 8, 2024	Best Screenplay	Cord Jefferson	Nominated	
San Francisco Bay Area Film Critics Circle Awards	January 9, 2024	Best Actor	Jeffrey Wright	Won	
San Francisco Bay Area Film Critics Circle Awards	January 9, 2024	Best Supporting Actor	Sterling K. Brown	Nominated	
San Francisco Bay Area Film Critics Circle Awards	January 9, 2024	Best Adapted Screenplay	Cord Jefferson	Won	
Austin Film Critics Association Awards	January 10, 2024	Best Film	American Fiction	Nominated	
Austin Film Critics Association Awards	January 10, 2024	Best Actor	Jeffrey Wright	Nominated	
Austin Film Critics Association Awards	January 10, 2024	Best Adapted Screenplay	Cord Jefferson	Nominated	
Austin Film Critics Association Awards	January 10, 2024	Best First Film	American Fiction	Nominated	
Denver Film Critics Society	January 12, 2024	Best Lead Performance by an Actor, Male	Jeffrey Wright	Nominated	
Denver Film Critics Society	January 12, 2024	Best Comedy	American Fiction	Nominated	
Denver Film Critics Society	January 12, 2024	Best Adapted Screenplay	Cord Jefferson	Nominated	
Critics' Choice Movie Awards	January 14, 2024	Best Picture	American Fiction	Nominated	
Critics' Choice Movie Awards	January 14, 2024	Best Actor	Jeffrey Wright	Nominated	
Critics' Choice Movie Awards	January 14, 2024	Best Supporting Actor	Sterling K. Brown	Nominated	
Critics' Choice Movie Awards	January 14, 2024	Best Adapted Screenplay	Cord Jefferson	Won	
Critics' Choice Movie Awards	January 14, 2024	Best Comedy	American Fiction	Nominated	
African-American Film Critics Association	January 15, 2024	Top 10 Films of the Year	American Fiction	1st Place	
African-American Film Critics Association	January 15, 2024	Best Comedy	American Fiction	Won	
African-American Film Critics Association	January 15, 2024	Best Supporting Actor	Sterling K. Brown	Won	
African-American Film Critics Association	January 15, 2024	Best Screenplay	Cord Jefferson	Won	
African-American Film Critics Association	January 15, 2024	Emerging Filmmaker	Cord Jefferson	Won	
Black Reel Awards	January 16, 2024	Outstanding Film	Ben LeClair, Nikos Karamigios, Cord Jefferson, and Jermaine Johnson	Won	
Black Reel Awards	January 16, 2024	Outstanding Director	Cord Jefferson	Won	
Black Reel Awards	January 16, 2024	Outstanding Lead Performance	Jeffery Wright	Won	
Black Reel Awards	January 16, 2024	Outstanding Supporting Performance	Erika Alexander	Nominated	
Black Reel Awards	January 16, 2024	Outstanding Supporting Performance	Sterling K. Brown	Nominated	
Black Reel Awards	January 16, 2024	Outstanding Ensemble	Jennifer Euston	Nominated	
Black Reel Awards	January 16, 2024	Outstanding Emerging Director	Cord Jefferson	Won	
Black Reel Awards	January 16, 2024	Outstanding Screenplay	Cord Jefferson	Won	
Black Reel Awards	January 16, 2024	Outstanding First Screenplay	Cord Jefferson	Won	
Houston Film Critics Society	January 22, 2024	Best Picture	American Fiction	Nominated	
Houston Film Critics Society	January 22, 2024	Best Actor	Jeffrey Wright	Nominated	
Houston Film Critics Society	January 22, 2024	Best Screenplay	Cord Jefferson	Nominated	
AACTA International Awards	February 10, 2024	Best Film	American Fiction	Nominated	
AACTA International Awards	February 10, 2024	Best Lead Actor in Film	Jeffrey Wright	Nominated	
AACTA International Awards	February 10, 2024	Best Screenplay in Film	Cord Jefferson	Nominated	
Directors Guild of America Awards	February 10, 2024	Outstanding Directing – First-Time Feature Film	Cord Jefferson	Nominated	
Set Decorators Society of America Awards	February 13, 2024	Best Achievement in Décor/Design of a Comedy or Musical Feature Film	Kyra Friedman Curcio and Jonathan Guggenheim	Nominated	
Society of Composers & Lyricists	February 13, 2024	Outstanding Original Score for a Studio Film	Laura Karpman	Nominated	
British Academy Film Awards	February 18, 2024	Best Adapted Screenplay	Cord Jefferson	Won	
Satellite Awards	February 18, 2024	Best Motion Picture, Comedy or Musical	American Fiction	Nominated	
Satellite Awards	February 18, 2024	Best Actor in a Motion Picture, Comedy or Musical	Jeffrey Wright	Nominated	
Satellite Awards	February 18, 2024	Best Screenplay, Adapted	Cord Jefferson and Percival Everett	Won	
Satellite Awards	February 18, 2024	Best Original Score	Laura Karpman	Won	
Cinema for Peace Awards	February 18–19, 2024	Cinema for Peace Dove for The Most Valuable Film of the Year 2024	American Fiction	Nominated	
Costume Designers Guild Awards	February 21, 2024	Excellence in Contemporary Film	Rudy Mance	Nominated	
Screen Actors Guild Awards	February 24, 2024	Outstanding Performance by a Cast in a Motion Picture	Erika Alexander, Adam Brody, Sterling K. Brown, Keith David, John Ortiz, Issa Rae, Tracee Ellis Ross, Leslie Uggams, and Jeffrey Wright	Nominated	
Screen Actors Guild Awards	February 24, 2024	Outstanding Performance by a Male Actor in a Leading Role	Jeffrey Wright	Nominated	
Screen Actors Guild Awards	February 24, 2024	Outstanding Performance by a Male Actor in a Supporting Role	Sterling K. Brown	Nominated	
Producers Guild of America Awards	February 25, 2024	Darryl F. Zanuck Award for Outstanding Producer of Theatrical Motion Pictures	American Fiction	Nominated	
Independent Spirit Awards	February 25, 2024	Best Film	Cord Jefferson, Jermaine Johnson, Nikos Karamigios, and Ben LeClair	Nominated	
Independent Spirit Awards	February 25, 2024	Best Lead Performance	Jeffrey Wright	Won	
Independent Spirit Awards	February 25, 2024	Best Supporting Performance	Erika Alexander	Nominated	
Independent Spirit Awards	February 25, 2024	Best Supporting Performance	Sterling K. Brown	Nominated	
Independent Spirit Awards	February 25, 2024	Best Screenplay	Cord Jefferson	Won	
USC Scripter Awards	March 2, 2024	Best Adapted Screenplay – Film	Cord Jefferson	Won	
American Cinema Editors	March 3, 2024	Best Edited Feature Film (Comedy, Theatrical)	Hilda Rasula	Nominated	
Artios Awards	March 7, 2024	Outstanding Achievement in Casting – Feature Studio or Independent (Drama)	Jennifer Euston, Lisa Lobel, Angela Peri, and Melissa Morris	Nominated	
Academy Awards	March 10, 2024	Best Picture	Ben LeClair, Nikos Karamigios, Cord Jefferson, and Jermaine Johnson	Nominated	
Academy Awards	March 10, 2024	Best Actor	Jeffrey Wright	Nominated	
Academy Awards	March 10, 2024	Best Supporting Actor	Sterling K. Brown	Nominated	
Academy Awards	March 10, 2024	Best Adapted Screenplay	Cord Jefferson	Won	
Academy Awards	March 10, 2024	Best Original Score	Laura Karpman	Nominated	
GLAAD Media Awards	March 14, 2024	Outstanding Film – Wide Release	American Fiction	Nominated	
NAACP Image Awards	March 16, 2024	Outstanding Motion Picture	American Fiction	Nominated	
NAACP Image Awards	March 16, 2024	Outstanding Actor in a Motion Picture	Jeffrey Wright	Nominated	
NAACP Image Awards	March 16, 2024	Outstanding Supporting Actor in a Motion Picture	Sterling K. Brown	Nominated	
NAACP Image Awards	March 16, 2024	Outstanding Supporting Actress in a Motion Picture	Erika Alexander	Nominated	
NAACP Image Awards	March 16, 2024	Outstanding Writing in a Motion Picture	Cord Jefferson	Won	
NAACP Image Awards	March 16, 2024	Outstanding Ensemble Cast in a Motion Picture	American Fiction	Nominated	
Writers Guild of America Awards	April 14, 2024	Best Adapted Screenplay	Cord Jefferson	Won	
Writers Guild of America Awards	April 14, 2024	Paul Selvin Award	Cord Jefferson	Won	
Grammy Awards	February 2, 2025	Best Score Soundtrack for Visual Media	Laura Karpman	Nominated	

== See also ==
- Bamboozled
- Hollywood Shuffle
