= The Defenders (2010 TV series) =

2010 American legal comedy drama

- Genre: Comedy drama; Legal drama
- Created by: Kevin Kennedy; Niels Mueller
- Starring: Jim Belushi; Jerry O'Connell; Jurnee Smollett-Bell; Tanya Fischer
- Country of origin: United States
- Original language: English
- No. of seasons: 1
- No. of episodes: 18

Production
- Executive producers: Harry Gantz; Joe Gantz; Kevin Kennedy; Niels Mueller; Carol Mendelsohn
- Running time: 43 minutes
- Production companies: Carol Mendelsohn Productions; CBS Productions

Original release
- Network: CBS
- Release: September 22, 2010 – March 11, 2011

The Defenders is an American legal comedy-drama television series that was ordered to series by CBS for the 2010–11 television season. The series originally ran from September 22, 2010, to March 11, 2011. Set in Las Vegas, Nevada, the show involves a pair of defense attorneys who go all out to help their clients while keeping their personal lives in order. The show is loosely based on real-life Vegas lawyers Michael Cristalli and Marc Saggese. This series is not related to the 1960s CBS series of the same name.

In October 2010, CBS announced that the show had been picked up for a 18-episode season with the option to produce a full 22-episode season. In January 2011, CBS announced that The Defenders was moving from its Wednesday timeslot to the Friday timeslot vacated by Medium which aired on NBC and then CBS for seven seasons, with Blue Bloods temporarily moving to the timeslot The Defenders vacated. Blue Bloods returned to its Friday timeslot in February 2011 owing to the series premiere of Criminal Minds: Suspect Behavior. The Defenders aired the last six episodes of its season on Fridays at 8:00 p.m. Eastern/7:00 p.m. Central. Jim Belushi and Jerry O'Connell star as the defense attorneys of the show's title.

On May 15, 2011, CBS canceled the series after one season.

== Cast and characters ==
=== Main ===
- Jerry O'Connell as Pete Kaczmarek, a freewheeling playboy lawyer
- Jim Belushi as Nick Morelli, Pete's partner, who is very passionate about his work and the clients he helps
- Jurnee Smollett-Bell as Lisa Tyler, a young lawyer who worked her way through law school as a dancer
- Tanya Fischer as Zoey Waters, Pete and Nick's assistant

=== Recurring ===
- Gillian Vigman as Jessica, Nick's estranged wife
- Teddy Sears as Thomas Cole, a prosecuting attorney
- Glynn Turman as Judge Bob Owens
- Dan Aykroyd as Judge Maximus Hunter

== Episodes ==
No.	Title	Directed by	Written by	Original release date	US viewers (millions)
1	"Pilot"	Davis Guggenheim	Kevin Kennedy & Niels Mueller	September 22, 2010	12.09
Las Vegas attorneys Nick Morelli and Pete Kaczmarek defend a murder client.
2	"Las Vegas v. Reid"	Jeff Melman	Peter Noah	September 29, 2010	10.41
Nick defends a mother who killed a jogger while driving.
3	"Nevada v. Carter"	Jeff Melman	Peter Noah	October 6, 2010	9.28
Nick defends a dancer at a strip club.
4	"Nevada v. Cerrato"	Charlie Haid	Brett Conrad	October 13, 2010	9.90
Nick takes on an arson case. Pete defends a drunk gambler who lost millions.
5	"Nevada v. Senator Harper"	Jeff Thomas	Jacqueline Hoyt & Bruce Rasmussen	October 20, 2010	10.03
Pete and Nick defend a state senator who is accused of murdering his mistress.
6	"Nevada v. Rodgers"	Jamie Babbit	Kevin Kennedy & Niels Mueller	October 27, 2010	9.80
Nick defends a getaway driver's charge of attempted murder. Pete pleas for a man who stole Elvis collectables.
7	"Las Vegas v. Johnson"	Tim Busfield	Carolina Paiz	November 3, 2010	9.94
Pete and Nick defend a celebrity murder case.
8	"Nevada v. Killa Diz"	Rod Holcomb	Brett Conrad	November 10, 2010	8.40
Nick defends a rapper. Pete bargains with the FBI for an internet hacker.
9	"Whitten v. Fenlee"	Christine Moore	Peter Noah & Bruce Rasmussen	November 17, 2010	9.43
A man dies on a construction site and his wife sues the company with Nick as her lawyer. Another man, represented by Pete, tries to get himself out of trouble after exposing a magician's secret.
10	"Nevada v. Dennis"	Matt Earl Beesley	Jacqueline Hoyt	December 8, 2010	10.54
A man gets in trouble for dealing with guns with filed-off serial numbers. Nick tries to stop a bear from being put to sleep.
11	"Nevada v. Reily"	Richard J. Lewis	Kevin Kennedy	December 15, 2010	10.29
A man who used to play football gets in trouble for assault. Meanwhile, Pete is not happy that his father decides to come visit.
12	"Nevada v. Wayne"	Greg Beeman	Bruce Rasmussen	January 12, 2011	6.81
Nick defends a young man he knows who is accused of sexual assault, while Pete gets jury duty.
13	"Nevada v. Donnie The Numbers Guy"	John Showalter	Brett Conrad	February 4, 2011	8.71
A man returns to prove he is innocent of murdering his wife seventeen years after he skipped his trial.
14	"Nevada v. Doug the Mule"	Charlie Haid	Carolina Paiz	February 11, 2011	7.91
Nick and Pete defend a young man who has been duped by a woman to smuggle a car full of cocaine across the Mexican border.
15	"Nevada v. Hunter"	Brad Silberling	Niels Mueller	February 18, 2011	8.47
Facing 30 counts of possession of a controlled substance, an overconfident judge turns to Nick, who has no choice but to try to get him acquitted of the charges.
16	"Noland v. Galloway Pharmaceuticals"	Christine Moore	Matt Payne	February 25, 2011	8.68
The firm represents a teenager who took the wrong dosage of a medication.
17	"Nevada v. Greene"	Charlie Haid	Kevin Kennedy	March 4, 2011	8.59
The firm represents a partier who is accused of murdering a woman while under the influence of alcohol.
18	"Morelli v. Kaczmarek"	Paul McCrane	Niels Mueller	March 11, 2011	8.38
The firm temporarily dissolves its partnership when they have to defend a husband and wife accused of murder.

== See also ==
- List of television shows set in Las Vegas
