= Ben Banks (film) =

- Promotional poster
- Directed by: Bryce Clark
- Written by: Bryce Clark
- Produced by: Justin Lyon; Jacob Moffat (Co); Jory Cordy (Associate)
- Starring: Mischa Barton; Melora Hardin; Katharine Towne; David Sullivan
- Cinematography: Chris Saul
- Edited by: Jason deVilliers
- Music by: Russ Howard III
- Distributed by: Spotlight Pictures; Green Apple (USA DVD)
- Release date: December 7, 2012 (United States)
- Running time: 82 minutes
- Country: United States
- Language: English

Ben Banks is a 2012 independent American comedy-drama and the directorial debut of Bryce Clark. The film stars Mischa Barton, Melora Hardin and Katharine Towne. The film is also being marketed as Beauty and the Least in some international territories and for the US video release. The film received a limited theatrical release in the United States on 7 December 2012.

== Plot ==
Ben Banks, the 28-year-old journalism student, is a stoner who constantly avoids responsibility and happens to be on the 12-year plan at the local two-year community college. Ben Banks, the movie, asks: What would it take to awaken ambition in this guy? The answer: A local conspiracy, a dead body, and a gorgeous woman (Mischa Barton) with a troubled past.

== Cast ==
- Mischa Barton as Amy
- Melora Hardin as Mary Andrews
- Katharine Towne as Erin Parker
- David Sullivan as Glenn Ambers
- Kim Huffman as Fran Banks
- Ben Banks as Ben Banks
- Sal Masekela as Hank Ashby
- Ben Lyons as Vernon
- Michael Hobert as Greg Timmons
- Alex Beh as Gunner Smith
- Cyle West as Ezra

== Production ==
The film is based on a junior communication major at Dixie State College of Utah, Ben Banks, a real-life acquaintance of Clark. They had worked together on a commercial and Banks made an impression on the filmmaker. Banks later shared stories of his life experience and Clark developed these into a fact and fiction based screenplay. Ben Banks plays himself in the movie.

The film has a subtle religious theme that reflects Clark's own experience of leaving and coming back to the Church of Jesus Christ of Latter-day Saints (LDS Church), and his struggle to find acceptance.

Along with Justin Lyon (producer), Jason deVilliers (editor), and Richard Bennett (designer), Clark is a partner in StoryLand Entertainment, a production company.

It was primarily filmed in St. George, Utah and the Las Vegas Valley. Scenes were also shot at Utah Tech University(formerly Dixie State). Filming completed at the end of August 2010.

=== Release ===
In October 2011, the producers revealed that they were seeking distribution and are exploring alternative models such as online streaming, VOD, iTunes, Netflix, Redbox and Hulu.

On 31 October 2012, it was announced that the film would receive a limited release in the United States. It was released at Utah Multiplexes on 7 December 2012, in St. George, Cedar City and South Jordan.

== Reception ==
The film has received a modest critical reception. The St. George Spectrum gave it a "B" commending it for its moral boost at the end. The Sun Independent, another St George newspaper, gave the film 3 and a half stars and felt that the film works well as a comedy. The reviewer describes the film as ″an affectionate (and beautifully shot) comedy, and it represents the spirit of independent filmmaking in its purest form.″ The Salt Lake Tribune in an open letter to the director, Bryce Clark, encouraged Clark to continue filmmaking while praising his direction and Barton's ″charming″ performance, though ultimately giving the film a failing review, criticizing the ″disjointed″ script.
