= Small Town Wisconsin =

- Film poster
- Directed by: Niels Mueller
- Screenplay by: Jason Naczek
- Produced by: Scott Foley; Josh Rosenberg; Niels Mueller; Hongtao Liu
- Starring: David Sullivan; Kristen Johnston; Bill Heck; Cooper J. Friedman; Tanya Fischer; Braden Andersen; Malkia Stampley; David Sapiro; Andi Matusiak; Lily Knight; David Ferrie
- Cinematography: Nathaniel Goodman
- Edited by: Tracy Adams
- Music by: Nicholas Jacobson-Larson
- Production companies: Mahua FunAge; Cream City Films
- Distributed by: Quiver Distribution
- Release dates: August 15, 2020 (Sarajevo); June 10, 2022 (United States)
- Country: United States
- Language: English

Small Town Wisconsin is a 2020 American drama film written by Jason Naczek, directed by Niels Mueller and starring David Sullivan, Kristen Johnston and Bill Heck. Alexander Payne and Jinhua Yang served as executive producers of the film.

The film was released in theaters in the United States on June 10, 2022, by Quiver Distribution.

== Plot ==
After losing a custody battle, perpetual teenager Wayne Stobierski steals his son away for one last father-son weekend to the city of their dreams - Milwaukee, Wisconsin. What's supposed to be a light-hearted adventure, transforms into a journey of profound redemption.

== Cast ==
- Kristen Johnston as Alicia
- Tanya Fischer as Deidra
- David Sapiro as Stu
- David Sullivan as Wayne
- Cooper J. Friedman as Tyler
- Bill Heck as Chuck
- Braden Andersen as Matt
- David Ferrie as Tom

== Release ==
The film premiered at the Sarajevo Film Festival in August 2020. The film was also shown at the Milwaukee Film Festival in October 2020.

It was picked up for online distribution by Quiver.

== Reception ==
On Rotten Tomatoes, the film has an 83% rating based on 12 reviews. Glenn Kenny of The New York Times wrote that director Niels Mueller’s approach was "patient and sensitive," praising the cast and noting that the film’s comedic elements “sometimes earn a chuckle.”

== See also ==
- Independent film
- Film industry in Wisconsin
