= David Sullivan (actor) =

American film and television actor

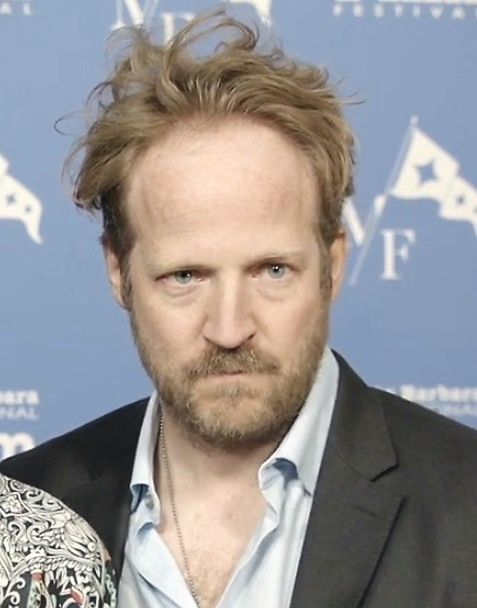
- Sullivan in 2023
- Born: David Wade Sullivan; Tyler, Texas, U.S.
- Occupation: Actor
- Years active: 2004–present
- Known for: Flaked; Primer

David Wade Sullivan is an American film and television actor. His roles include Abe in the cult classic time travel film Primer (2004) and Dennis in the Netflix dramedy series Flaked (2016-2017).

== Career ==
Sullivan starred as Abe in the 2004 independent film Primer, which won the Grand Jury Prize at the Sundance Film Festival. Sullivan was nominated for the Film Independent Spirit Award for Best Debut Performance at the 2004 Film Independent Spirit Awards ceremony. The movie was filmed in Dallas in 2001, but spent two years in editing and post-production. Since the debut of Primer, Sullivan moved to Los Angeles to pursue a career as an actor. Sullivan played Deputy Chief of Staff Jon Titterton in the 2012 film Argo.

He has appeared in several television shows including Joey, Justified, Big Love, Boston Legal and CSI: Crime Scene Investigation. He played Dennis in the Netflix original series Flaked, opposite Will Arnett, which premiered in 2016.

== Filmography ==
=== Film ===
Year	Title	Role	Notes
2004	Primer	Abe	
2006	The Astronaut Farmer	Young Man	
2008	Karma Police	Oscar	
2008	Copley: An American Fairytale	Alex	
2009	The Lodger	LAPD Officer	
2010	Skateland	Luther	
2010	Urgency	Richter	
2012	Extracted	Peter	
2012	Argo	Jon Titterton	
2012	Ben Banks	Glenn Ambers	
2014	Bigfoot Wars	Deputy Walton	
2014	Nanny Cam	Jason	
2016	The Veil	Matt	
2016	In Dubious Battle	Simmons	
2017	Deidra & Laney Rob a Train	Chet	Netflix movie
2017	Girlfriend's Day	Sonnyboy	
2017	M.F.A.	Cavanaugh	
2020	Small Town Wisconsin	Wayne	
2020	Monuments	Ted Daniels	

=== Television ===
Year	Title	Role	Notes
2005	Joey	Guy	Episode: "Joey and the Spanking"
2006	Big Love	Junior Accountant	Episode: "Viagra Blue"
2008	Boston Legal	Jason Canfield	Episode: "The Bad Seed"
2009	Criminal Minds	Patrick Cavanaugh	Episode: "Demonology"
2009	CSI: Crime Scene Investigation	Hotel Manager	Episode: "Family Affair"
2009	CSI: NY	James Manning	Episode: "Second Chances"
2010	NCIS	Special Agent Larry Krone	Episode: "Short Fuse"
2010–11	Gigantic	Adrian	3 episodes
2011	Justified	Jess Timmons	Episode: "The Life Inside"
2011	Love's Christmas Journey	Homesteader	TV movie
2013	The Fosters	David Fressola	Episode: "Pilot"
2013	The Glades	Red Morton	Episode: "Tin Cup"
2014	NCIS: Los Angeles	ATF Agent Kevin Clark	Episode: "Between the Lines"
2015	Preface to Being Jaded	Nicholas	Episode: "Executives"
2015	New Girl	Duffy	Episode: "The Right Thing"
2015	Wicked City	Detective Arnold Bukowski	Episode: "Pilot"
2016–17	Flaked	Dennis	Main cast, 14 episodes
2016	The 5th Quarter	Garry Shinehart	Episode: "Fifth of Screams"
2018	Lewis and Clark	Joseph Field	TV mini-series
2018	Sharp Objects	Chris	8 episodes
2020	The Wilds	Daniel Faber	Main role
2022	Snowfall	Grady Williamson	2 episodes
