= The Dead Center =

- Directed by: Billy Senese
- Written by: Billy Senese
- Produced by: Shane Carruth; Denis Deck; Jonathan Rogers; Billy Senese
- Starring: Shane Carruth
- Cinematography: Andy Duensing
- Edited by: Derek Pearson; Jonathan Rogers
- Music by: Jordan Lehning
- Production companies: Sequitur Cinema; Movie City Films; LC Pictures
- Distributed by: Arrow Films
- Release dates: September 2018 (LA Film Fest); October 11, 2019
- Running time: 92 minutes 93 minutes
- Country: United States
- Language: English

The Dead Center is a 2018 American horror mystery thriller film written and directed by Billy Senese and starring Shane Carruth.

== Plot ==
A male corpse, later referred to as John Doe, is brought into a hospital morgue after an apparent suicide. The man comes back to life, makes his way to a hospital bed, and falls asleep.

Dr. Edward Graham, a medical investigator, is alarmed by the missing body. When nurses find John Doe the next morning, he is in a catatonic state and his body is covered in scars. Examining John Doe's autopsy photographs, Graham notices a peculiar spiral-shaped scar in one of the photos.

Hospital psychologist Daniel Forrester examines John Doe. Concluding John Doe is at risk of self-harm, he orders him moved to a seclusion room. As a nurse named Travis checks on John Doe, he is attacked by the patient. Forrester calms him down and injects him with a syringe of benzodiazapine. Later that night, as he leaves work, Travis heavily heaves and coughs. He begins having hallucinations of screaming faces, which John Doe also experiences.

Examining the motel where John Doe supposedly committed suicide, Graham finds the same spiral pattern carved into the bath tub, and a driver's license identifying John Doe as Michael Clark. Back at the precinct, Graham reads Clark's suicide note, which reads "I am the mouth of death. None are beyond my REACH. Forgive me". He then drives to Clark's family's house.

In the hospital, Forrester successfully hypnotizes Clark. Clark explains that he died in a house fire, and brought back something which he describes as a spinning blackness. Clark had attempted suicide, only to revive and make it stronger. He says that it is attacking him and wearing him down, having made him kill someone. Clark returns to being catatonic. Afterwards, Forrester finds out that Travis is dead.

Clark escapes from his room and attacks a female patient, sucking a black smoke from her mouth. In the morning, the patient is dead with her face frozen and dark lines spiraling outwards from her open mouth.

At Clark's parent's home, Graham finds out that Clark inexplicably survive a massive house fire that killed his wife. He finds photos and articles related to mass death events dating back to 79 A.D. Several of the images show victims with their face frozen like the female patient. In an article he finds the same quote as in Clark's suicide note. In the basement, Graham sees large spiral painted on the floor and an artistic depiction of the entity's true form: a gargantuan creature with a spiral for a face.

Forrester resumes questioning Clark, who warns him that the thing is becoming stronger. He urges Forrester to kill him, before stabbing himself with a syringe. The entity inside of Clark takes over and attacks Forrester, while inducing hallucinations of past victims' screaming faces. Hospital staff intervenes in time, saving Forrester. Head doctor (Dr. Grey) reprimands Forrester for his actions.

Forrester attempts to attack Clark, but is stopped and sedated. Clark attacks Grey. Graham goes back to the hospital and frantically looks for Clark, only to find he has already been released.

Forrester escapes his hospital room and looks for Grey, only to watch her die. He leaves with Clark's parent's address and a syringe of sedative.

At Clark's parents' house, Forrester finds the corpses of Clark's parents, his children, and Graham. Arming himself with a crowbar, Forrester searches the nearby houses, which contain more victims.

Eventually, Forrester locates Clark in one of the houses. He attacks Clark, but is overpowered. Clark pulls the black smoke from Forrester's mouth and assaults his mind with visions of screaming people. This continues until Forrester recalls the black circular pattern on the basement floor. He regains control of his senses and beats Clark to death.

The film closes with Forrester in an ambulance, not speaking, being taken care of by an EMT. He has dark lines emanating from the corners of his mouth which slowly spread over the rest of his face.

== Cast ==
- Shane Carruth as Daniel Forrester
- Poorna Jagannathan as Sarah Grey
- Jeremy Childs as Michael Clark
- Bill Feehely as Edward Graham
- Andy McPhee as Ben
- Rachel Agee as Anne
- Jackie Welch as Donna
- J. Thomas Bailey as Travis
- Shelean Newman as Dr. Ross
- Dean Hall as Detective Lawson
- Darius Willis as Floyd

== Release ==
The Dead Center premiered at the 2018 Los Angeles Film Festival. The film was released on October 11, 2019. It was released on DVD and Blu-ray on October 22, 2019.

== Reception ==
The film has a 94% rating on Rotten Tomatoes based on 18 reviews. Matt Fagerholm of RogerEbert.com awarded the film two and a half stars. Chuck Bowen of Slant Magazine awarded the film three stars out of four.

Dennis Harvey of Variety gave the film a positive review and wrote, "There's a lot of excellent atmospherics here that are more unsettling than the actual violence, which in turn is all the more effective for largely being kept just off-screen."

Frank Scheck of The Hollywood Reporter also gave the film a positive review and wrote, "Makes hospitals seem even scarier than they already are."
