= Primer (film) =

2004 film by Shane Carruth

- Theatrical release poster
- Directed by: Shane Carruth
- Written by: Shane Carruth
- Produced by: Shane Carruth
- Starring: Shane Carruth; David Sullivan
- Edited by: Shane Carruth
- Music by: Shane Carruth
- Distributed by: THINKFilm
- Release date: October 8, 2004
- Running time: 77 minutes
- Country: United States
- Language: English
- Budget: $7,000
- Box office: $841,926

Primer is a 2004 American independent science fiction film written, directed, produced, edited, and scored by Shane Carruth in his feature debut. The film stars Carruth and David Sullivan, and depicts the events surrounding the accidental discovery of time travel.

Primer is noted for its extremely low budget, experimental plot structure, philosophical implications, and complex technical dialogue, which Carruth, a college graduate with a degree in mathematics and a former engineer, chose not to simplify for the sake of the audience. The film won the Grand Jury Prize Dramatic at the 2004 Sundance Film Festival, before securing a limited release in the United States, and has since gained a cult following.

== Plot ==
The operation of time travel in Primer.

Two engineers, Aaron and Abe, supplement their day jobs with entrepreneurial tech projects, working out of Aaron's garage. During one such research effort involving electromagnetic reduction of objects' weight, the two men accidentally discover an 'A-to-B' causal loop side-effect: objects left in the weight-reducing field exhibit temporal anomalies, proceeding normally (from time 'A,' when the field was activated, to time 'B,' when the field is powered off), then backward (from 'B' back to 'A') in a continuously repeating sequence, such that objects can leave the field in the present, or at some previous point.

Abe refines this proof-of-concept and builds a stable time-apparatus ("the box"), sized to accommodate a human subject. Abe uses this box to travel six hours into his own past—as part of this process, Abe stays in a hotel room, isolating himself from any communication with the outside world, so as not to interact or interfere with the outside world, after which he enters the box then waits inside for six hours (thus going back in time six hours). Once he exits the box, Abe travels across town, explains the proceedings to Aaron, and brings Aaron back to the self-storage facility housing the box. At the facility, they watch the earlier version of Abe enter the box.

Abe and Aaron repeat Abe's six-hour experiment multiple times over multiple days, making profitable same-day stock trades armed with foreknowledge of the market's performance. The duo's divergent personalities – Abe cautious and controlling, Aaron impulsive and meddlesome – put subtle strain on their collaboration and friendship. Additionally, the time travel is taxing on Abe and Aaron's bodies: effectively their days become 36 hours long when including the extra time afforded by the box. As the film progresses, the two men begin to notice alarming side effects of time travel which take the form of earbleeds. Later, they notice their handwriting progressively worsening.

The tension between Abe and Aaron comes to a head after a late-night encounter with Thomas Granger (father to Abe's girlfriend, Rachel), who appears inexplicably unshaven and exists in overlap with his original suburban self. Granger falls into a comatose state after being pursued by Aaron; Aaron theorizes that, at some unknown point in the future, Granger entered the "box", with timeline-altering consequences. Abe concludes that time travel is simply too dangerous and enters a secret second box (the "failsafe box", built before the experiment began and kept continuously running), traveling back four days to prevent the experiment's launch.

Future-Abe sedates Original-Abe (so he will never conduct the initial time travel experiment) and meets Aaron at a park bench so as to dissuade him, but finds that Future-Aaron has gotten there first. It is revealed that during the initial experiment, Aaron had accidentally discovered the failsafe and used it, bringing a folded up box back into the past with his own body to set up his own failsafe and stay one step ahead of Abe; Future-Aaron then drugged his original self and locked him in his attic to keep him from interfering. Aaron then proceeded to record all the conversations of the following days with an inconspicuous earpiece, in order to be able to replay events and conversations in case something went wrong. Future-Abe faints at this revelation, overcome by shock and fatigue.

The two men briefly and tentatively reconcile. They jointly travel back in time, experiencing and reshaping an event where Abe's girlfriend Rachel was nearly killed by a gun-wielding party crasher. After many repetitions, Aaron, forearmed with knowledge of the party's events, stops the gunman, becoming a local hero. Abe and Aaron ultimately part ways; Aaron considers a new life in foreign countries where he can tamper more broadly for personal gain, while Abe states his intent to remain in town and dissuade/sabotage the original "box" experiment. Abe warns Aaron to leave and never return.

Multiple "box-aware" versions of Aaron circulate—at least one Future-Aaron has shared his knowledge with Original-Aaron, via a phone call that serves as the film's narration. Future-Abe watches over Original-Abe, going to painstaking extremes to keep him and Original-Aaron unaware of the future. An Aaron directs French-speaking workers in the construction of a warehouse-sized box.

== Cast ==
- Shane Carruth as Aaron
- David Sullivan as Abe

Carruth cast himself as Aaron after having trouble finding actors who could "break ... the habit of filling each line with so much drama". Most of the other actors are either friends or family members.

== Themes ==
Although one of the more fantastical elements of science fiction is central to the film, Carruth's goal was to portray scientific discovery in a down-to-earth and realistic manner. He notes that many of the greatest breakthrough scientific discoveries in history have occurred by accident, in locations no more glamorous than Aaron's garage.

Whether it involved the history of the number zero or the invention of the transistor, two things stood out to me. First is that the discovery that turns out to be the most valuable is usually dismissed as a side-effect. Second is that prototypes almost never include neon lights and chrome. I wanted to see a story play out that was more in line with the way real innovation takes place than I had seen on film before.

Carruth has said he intended the central theme of the film to be the breakdown of Abe and Aaron's relationship, as a result of their inability to cope with the power afforded them by this technological advancement:

First thing, I saw these guys as scientifically accomplished but ethically, morons. They never had any reasons before to have ethical questions. So when they're hit with this device they're blindsided by it. The first thing they do is make money with it. They're not talking about the ethics of altering your former self.

== Production ==
This Feynman diagram, with time progressing upwards, represents an electron and positron annihilating each other to produce a pair of photons. The electron is represented by an arrow pointing forwards in time, and the positron by one pointing backwards in time. This representation is motivated by CPT symmetry, which also motivates ideas such as the one-electron universe.

While writing the script, Carruth studied physics to help him make Abe and Aaron's technical dialogue sound authentic. He took the unusual step of eschewing contrived exposition and tried instead to portray the shorthand phrases and jargon used by working scientists. This philosophy carried over into production design. The time machine itself is a plain gray box, with a distinctive electronic "hum" created by overlaying the sounds of a mechanical grinder and a car engine, rather than by using a processed digital effect. Carruth also set the story in unglamorous industrial parks and suburban tract homes. The principles of time travel in the film are inspired by Feynman diagrams. Carruth explained: "Richard Feynman has some interesting ideas about time. When you look at Feynman diagrams [which map the interaction of elementary particles], there's really no difference between watching an interaction happen forward and backward in time."

Carruth chose to deliberately obfuscate the film's plot to mirror the complexity and confusion created by time travel. As he said in a 2004 interview: "This machine and Abe and Aaron's experience are inherently complicated so it needed to be that way in order for the audience to be where Abe and Aaron are, which was always my hope."

=== Filming ===
Principal photography took place over five weeks, on the outskirts of Dallas, Texas. The film was produced on a budget of only $7000 (equivalent to $12,500 in 2025), and a skeleton crew of five. Carruth acted as writer, director, producer, cinematographer, editor, and music composer. He also stars in the film as Aaron, and many of the other characters are played by his friends and family. The small budget required conservative use of the Super 16mm filmstock: the carefully limited number of takes resulted in an extremely low shooting ratio of 2:1. Every shot in the film was meticulously storyboarded on 35 mm stills. Carruth created a distinctive flat, overexposed look for the film by using fluorescent lighting, non-neutral color temperatures, high-speed film stock, and filters.

After shooting, Carruth took two years to fully post-produce Primer. He has since said that this experience was so arduous that he almost abandoned the film on several occasions.

=== Music ===
The entire film score was created by Carruth. On October 8, 2004, the Primer score was released on Amazon and iTunes.

== Release ==
=== Distribution ===
Carruth secured a North American distribution deal with THINKFilm after the company's head of theatrical distribution, Mark Urman, saw the film at the 2004 Sundance Film Festival. Although he and Carruth made a "handshake agreement" during the festival, Urman reported that the actual negotiation of the deal was the longest he had ever been involved with, in part due to Carruth's specific demands over how much control over the film he would retain. The film went on to take $545,436 at the box office.

=== Critical reception and legacy ===
Primer received positive reception from critics. Rotten Tomatoes gave the film a 72% approval rating based on 129 reviews, with an average rating of 6.6/10. The consensus reads: "Dense, obtuse, but stimulating, Primer is a film for viewers ready for a cerebral challenge." The site also listed Primer as one of the best science fiction films "for the thinking man". On Metacritic, the film holds a score of 68 out of 100 based on reviews from 25 critics, indicating "generally favorable reviews".

Many reviewers were impressed by the film's originality. Dennis Lim of The Village Voice said that it was "the freshest thing the genre has seen since 2001", while in The New York Times, A. O. Scott wrote that Carruth had "the skill, the guile and the seriousness to turn a creaky philosophical gimmick into a dense and troubling moral puzzle". Scott also enjoyed the film's realistic depiction of scientists at work, saying that Carruth had an "impressive feel for the odd, quiet rhythms of small-scale research and development". Roger Ebert's 3.5 star review for the Chicago-Sun Times also praised the complex technical dialogue as helping viewers feel as if they were eavesdropping on a genuine conversation (if only half-understood by much of the audience) rather than hearing actors delivering exposition.

There was also praise for Carruth's ability to maintain high production values on a minuscule budget, with Ebert declaring: "The movie never looks cheap, because every shot looks as it must look." Ty Burr of The Boston Globe commented that "aspects of Primer are so low-rent as to evoke guffaws", but added that "the homemade feel is part of the point". Similarly, Wired wrote: "Primer was noted for its originality – the film takes on complex topics like quantum physics and doesn't dumb them down for the viewer, instead using real jargon and terms that real-life researchers would – and for its commitment to a lo-fi aesthetic. Much of the film is set in garages and car parks, and then with the exception of the two lead roles, every other character is played by a friend or family member of the cast."

The film's experimental plot and dense dialogue were controversially received. Esquire's Mike D'Angelo claimed that "anybody who claims he fully understands what's going on in Primer after seeing it just once is either a savant or a liar". Scott Tobias writes for The A.V. Club: "The banter is heavy on technical jargon and almost perversely short on exposition; were it not for the presence of voiceover narration, the film would be close to incomprehensible." For the Los Angeles Times, Carina Chocano writes: "sticklers for linear storytelling are bound to be frustrated by narrative threads that start promisingly, then just sort of fall off the spool". Ebert predicted Primer would be rejected by those who want lighthearted entertainment, but embraced by the likes of "nerds, geeks, brainiacs [and] Academic Decathlon winners" who would enjoy the film's complexities. Some reviewers were entirely put off by the film's obfuscated narrative. Kirk Honeycutt of The Hollywood Reporter complained that Primer "nearly gets lost in a miasma of technical jargon and scientific conjecture".

"Primer is hopelessly confusing and grows more and more byzantine as it unravels", Chuck Klosterman writes in an essay on time travel films five years later. "I've watched it seven or eight times and I still don't know what happened." He nonetheless says it is "the finest movie about time travel I've ever seen" because of its realism:

It's not that the time machine ... seems more realistic; it's that the time travelers themselves seem more believable. They talk and act (and think) like the kind of people who might accidentally figure out how to move through time, which is why it's the best depiction we have of the ethical quandaries that might result from such a discovery.

Ultimately, Klosterman says, the lesson of Primer regarding time travel is that "it's too important to use only for money, but too dangerous to use for anything else".

The American director Steven Soderbergh is a fan of the film.

The film has been selected to be part of The A.V. Club's New Cult Canon. Donald Clarke, film critic with The Irish Times, included Primer at No. 20 on his list of the top twenty films of the decade (2000–2010). The film was selected by Time as one of the Top 10 Time-Travel Movies. It was ranked number two in Popular Mechanics' list of The 30 Best Time Travel Movies. MovieWeb ranked Primer at No. 17 on their list of the 30 Best Sci-fi Thrillers Of All Time. Rolling Stone ranked the film at No. 25 on their list of "The Top 40 Sci-Fi Movies of the 21st Century". Science fiction author Greg Egan describes Primer as "an ingenious, tautly constructed time-travel story".

== Awards ==
- Grand Jury Prize, Sundance Film Festival in 2004.
- Alfred P. Sloan Prize for films dealing with science and technology, the 2004 Sundance Film Festival.
- Best Writer/Director (Shane Carruth) at the Nantucket Film Festival in 2004.
- Best Feature at the London International Festival of Science Fiction in 2005.

== See also ==
- List of cult films

Awards
Preceded by American Splendor	Sundance Grand Jury Prize: U.S. Dramatic; 2004	Succeeded by Forty Shades of Blue
Preceded by Dopamine	Alfred P. Sloan Prize Winner; 2004	Succeeded by Grizzly Man
