= Mike D'Angelo =

American film critic

Mike D'Angelo (born April 9, 1968) is an American film critic. He has written reviews for The A.V. Club, Las Vegas Weekly and Nerve, and maintains a personal website, The Man Who Viewed Too Much. He lives near Los Angeles.

One of the first notable online film critics, D'Angelo created his site and began self-publishing short reviews in August 1995. In January 1997, Entertainment Weekly included The Man Who Viewed Too Much in an article about Internet film criticism, which was then in its infancy. The magazine subsequently hired him to write capsule film reviews for its video section. After contributing to Entertainment Weekly for three years, he became the chief film critic for Time Out New York (2000–2004) before moving to Esquire, where he served as the chief film critic. His writing has also appeared in Variety, The Village Voice, the Salt Lake City Weekly and the Nashville Scene.

D'Angelo participated in the 2012 Sight & Sound critics' poll, where he listed his ten favorite films as follows: 2001: A Space Odyssey, Blood Simple, Double Indemnity, Exotica, Manhattan, Only Angels Have Wings, Outer Space, Partie de campagne, A Star Is Born, and Woman of the Dunes.
