= Cord Jefferson =

American filmmaker

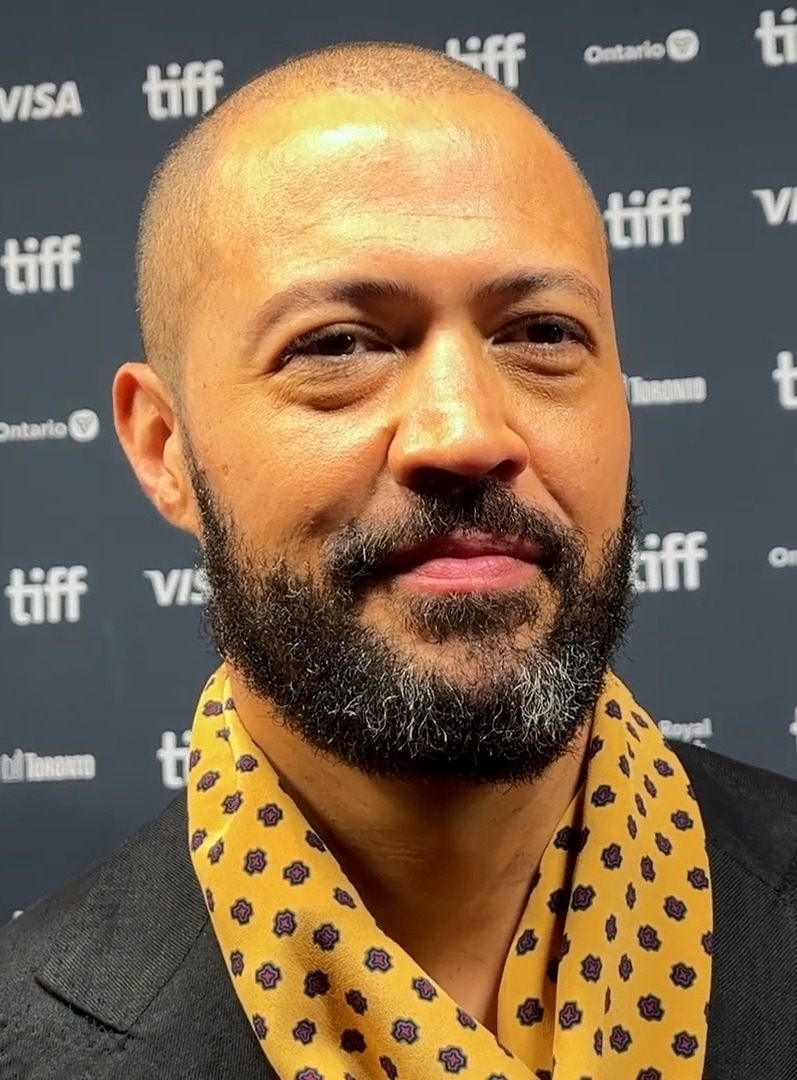
- Jefferson at TIFF 2023
- Born: Tucson, Arizona, U.S.
- Education: College of William and Mary (BA)
- Occupations: Screenwriter, director, journalist
- Writing career
- Notable work: American Fiction (2023)
- Notable awards: Primetime Emmy Award for Outstanding Writing for a Limited Series or Movie; Toronto International Film Festival People's Choice Award; Academy Award for Best Adapted Screenplay

Cord Jefferson is an American writer and director. After studying at the College of William & Mary, he started a career in journalism and wrote for numerous publications before becoming an editor at Gawker until 2014.

Jefferson transitioned to working as a writer for television. He wrote for the Comedy Central late-night series The Nightly Show with Larry Wilmore (2015–2016), the Netflix comedy series Master of None (2017), and the NBC sitcom The Good Place (2017–2019). For his work on the HBO limited series Watchmen (2019), he received the Primetime Emmy Award for Outstanding Writing for a Limited Series or Movie. Jefferson made his feature directorial debut with the satire American Fiction (2023), for which he received a nomination for Best Picture and won Best Adapted Screenplay at the 96th Academy Awards.

== Early life and education ==
Cord Jefferson was born in Tucson, Arizona, to a white mother and black father. After living outside the United States for several years until Jefferson was about five years old, the family returned to Tucson. His maternal grandfather was shocked by his daughter's choice to marry a black man, and he shut her and his grandson out of his life. Jefferson's parents divorced when he was 14 years old, after his first year of high school. Jefferson graduated from Canyon del Oro High School north of Tucson.

He attended the College of William & Mary in Williamsburg, Virginia, where his father had attended law school. After college, Jefferson lived in Los Angeles and in Brooklyn, New York. He also went to NYU for business school.

Jefferson's mother died in 2016 of cancer. When his father needed a kidney transplant in July 2008, Jefferson donated one of his, traveling to Saudi Arabia where his father lives. Jefferson wrote a personal essay on the experience, noting that he was treated for atrial fibrillation and that, after surgery, he quit smoking and began to take better care of his health.

== Career ==
=== 2009–2014: Journalism and Gawker ===
As a writer, Jefferson got his start in journalism. Among his first jobs were writing for both Stereohyped and MollyGood. He spent two years as an editor at Gawker, from 2012 to 2014. He also wrote for publications including USA Today, Huffington Post, The Root, and The New York Times Magazine.

=== 2014–present: Television work and film debut ===
Jefferson started his television career in 2014 as a staff writer for the Starz comedy-drama series Survivor's Remorse before writing for the comedy Central late night series The Nightly Show with Larry Wilmore from 2015 to 2016. Jefferson then became a story editor and consulting producer for Aziz Ansari's Netflix comedy series Master of None (2017), for which he received Writers Guild of America Award nominations., and the Mike Schur-created NBC sitcom The Good Place (2017–2019), For his work on the HBO limited series Watchmen (2019), he received the Primetime Emmy Award for Outstanding Writing for a Limited Series or Movie for the episode, "This Extraordinary Being." In the middle of 2020, Jefferson worked on a TV series about his time writing for Gawker. He is developing the show for Apple TV+. Later in that year, he signed an overall deal with Warner Bros. Television.

In 2021, Jefferson served as a writer and supervising producer for the HBO limited series Station Eleven. He made his feature directorial debut with the satirical film American Fiction (2023), which won the People's Choice Award at the Toronto International Film Festival and was nominated for five categories at the 96th Academy Awards and won Best Adapted Screenplay.

On April 2, 2026, Netflix announced a straight-to-series order for The Corrections, based on Jonathan Franzen’s bestselling 2001 novel. Jefferson will direct all episodes of the limited series, with Meryl Streep cast in the lead role.

== Filmography ==
=== Film ===
Year	Title	Role	Notes
2023	American Fiction	Director, writer, producer	

=== Television ===
Year	Title	Role	Notes
2014	Survivor's Remorse	Staff writer	6 episodes
2015–2016	The Nightly Show with Larry Wilmore	Writer	196 episodes
2017	Master of None	Story editor, consulting producer	10 episodes
2017–2019	The Good Place	Writer, story editor, co-producer	25 episodes
2019	Succession	Consultant	10 episodes
2019	Watchmen	Writer, story editor	9 episodes
2021	Station Eleven	Writer, supervising producer	Episode: "The Severn City Airport"
2025	It: Welcome to Derry	Writer, consulting producer	

== Awards and nominations ==
Year	Award	Category	Nominated work	Result	Refs
2018	Writers Guild of America Awards	Comedy Series	Master of None	Nominated	
2019	Writers Guild of America Awards	Comedy Series	The Good Place	Nominated	
2020	NAACP Image Awards	Outstanding Writing in a Comedy Series	The Good Place (Episode: "Tinker, Tailor, Demon, Spy")	Won	
2020	Writers Guild of America Awards	Drama Series	Succession	Won	
2020	Writers Guild of America Awards	Drama Series	Watchmen	Nominated	
2020	Writers Guild of America Awards	New Series	Watchmen	Won	
2020	Primetime Emmy Awards	Outstanding Writing for a Limited Series or Movie	Watchmen (Episode: "This Extraordinary Being")	Won	
2023	Toronto International Film Festival	People's Choice Award	American Fiction	Won	
2023	Mill Valley Film Festival	Breakthrough Directing	American Fiction	Won	
2023	Mill Valley Film Festival	Audience Award	American Fiction	Won	
2023	Middleburg Film Festival	Audience Award - Narrative Feature	American Fiction	Won	
2023	Virginia Film Festival	Programmer's Choice Award	American Fiction	Won	
2023	Virginia Film Festival	Breakthrough Director Award	American Fiction	Won	
2024	Academy Awards	Best Picture	American Fiction	Nominated	
2024	Academy Awards	Best Adapted Screenplay	American Fiction	Won	
2024	British Academy Film Awards	Best Adapted Screenplay	American Fiction	Won	
2024	Critics' Choice Movie Award	Best Adapted Screenplay	American Fiction	Won	
2024	Black Reel Awards	Outstanding Film	American Fiction	Won	
2024	Black Reel Awards	Outstanding Director	American Fiction	Won	
2024	Black Reel Awards	Outstanding Emerging Director	American Fiction	Won	
2024	Black Reel Awards	Outstanding Screenplay	American Fiction	Won	
2024	Black Reel Awards	Outstanding First Screenplay	American Fiction	Won	
2024	Independent Spirit Awards	Best Film	American Fiction	Nominated	
2024	Independent Spirit Awards	Best Screenplay	American Fiction	Won	
2024	Directors Guild of America Awards	Outstanding Directing – First-Time Feature Film	American Fiction	Nominated	
2024	Writers Guild of America Awards	Best Adapted Screenplay	American Fiction	Won	
2025	Cinema for Peace	Most Valuable Film of the Year		Nominated	
