= The Color Purple (2023 soundtrack) =

2023 soundtrack albums

The Color Purple is a 2023 film directed by Blitz Bazawule. It is an adaptation of the stage musical of the same name, which in turn was based on Alice Walker's 1982 novel and its 1985 film adaptation. Three soundtrack albums were released for the film.

The first album, The Color Purple (Original Motion Picture Soundtrack), was released on December 15, 2023, and features the film's musical numbers performed by the cast. The second album, The Color Purple (Music from and Inspired by the Motion Picture) was released on December 22, and also features the musical numbers alongside songs that are not used as musical numbers in the film and performed by popular artists. Both albums were published by WaterTower in collaboration with Gamma.

The third album, The Color Purple (Original Motion Picture Score), was released on December 25 by WaterTower, and features the film's original score composed by Kris Bowers

== Background ==
The Color Purple featured musical performances from the Broadway production and the original 1985 film. Bazawule described the challenging aspect as being "how to make Broadway music more cinematic", hence he took the influences of African-American music and transitioned it to gospel, blues and jazz to achieve the same. 13 songs from the musical were not included in the film, whereas the song "She Be Mine", which was cut from the musical was reinstated in the film.

Kris Bowers met Bazawule in late-2021, six months before the film began production. They discussed whether the score needed to glue with the songs, to which he replied "Even if the score was going to have its own identity, it was important that we had some sort of tangential connection between the songs and whatever I was writing". His early involvement was mostly in the process of pre-recording and arranging the songs. Bazawule showed Bowers several storyboards for the two-hour version of the film, so that he could underlay the emotional and character-based themes for the film.

For Mister's (Domingo) theme, he incorporated a banjo as "an underlying, eerie texture that represents the twisted internal world for him". For other characters, most of the score carried their "internal feelings" throughout their journey, but in a way that was different from the songs. For Celie's (Fantasia) theme, it had a sense of simplicity and a bit of loneliness in the beginning. The score begins with a sparse note, but as her story grows and she steps into power, it grows into a full blown orchestral sound. He wanted the theme to have the brightness and joy as well as scope and scale to it, especially during the emotional moments. A 22-foot gramophone was used as an integral part of the film score.

In sequences where Celie and Shug Avery (Henson) celebrated the color purple, the score had to complement the scene and not to overpower. Hence, he recorded the sequence with close microphones and a smaller ensemble to give an intimate feeling.

== Release ==
=== Singles ===
On November 10, 2023, Warner Bros. submitted two original songs from the film for award submission as a part of their For Your Consideration campaign; the titles were revealed to be "Keep It Movin'" and "Superpower (I)". The former was released as a single on November 11, 2023. The song was composed by the record production and songwriting duo Nova Wav, which involeves Denisia Andrews and Brittany Coney, and is produced by Nick Baxter, Stephen Bray, Morten Ristorp and the director himself under the pseudonym "Blitz the Ambassador". Halle Bailey and Phylicia Pearl Mpasi performed the song.

The second single "Lifeline" was released on November 27; the same day the soundtrack being announced. Alicia Keys co-wrote and co-produced the song, with Marshmello, Tricky Stewart and production team TMS. It was described by Keys as a "heartfelt ode to the unequivocal comfort emanating from friends, family, and community that holds us up as we face life's challenging moments."

== The Color Purple (Original Motion Picture Soundtrack) ==
The Color Purple (Original Motion Picture Soundtrack)

Soundtrack album by various artists
- Released: December 15, 2023
- Genres: Soundtrack; musical
- Length: 52:14
- Labels: WaterTower; Gamma
- Producers: Quincy Jones; Scott Sanders; Larry Jackson

Singles from The Color Purple (Original Motion Picture Soundtrack)
- 1. "Keep It Movin'" Released: November 11, 2023

On November 27, WaterTower Music, Warner Records and Gamma Records announced the release of the soundtrack featuring performances from the cast members—Taraji P. Henson, Danielle Brooks, Colman Domingo, Corey Hawkins, H.E.R., Halle Bailey, Phylicia Pearl Mpasi, and Fantasia Barrino. The album featured numbers from both the musical as well as the 1985 film. The album was released on December 15.

=== Track listing ===
The Color Purple (Original Motion Picture Soundtrack) Track listing
No.	Title	Artist(s)/Performer(s)	Length
1.	"Huckleberry Pie"	Halle Bailey; Phylicia Pearl Mpasi	1:07
2.	"Mysterious Ways"	Tamela Mann; David Alan Grier; Halle Bailey; The Color Purple ensemble	3:47
3.	"She Be Mine"	Phylicia Pearl Mpasi; The Color Purple ensemble	3:39
4.	"Keep It Movin'"	Halle Bailey; Phylicia Pearl Mpasi	3:53
5.	"Workin'"	Corey Hawkins; The Color Purple ensemble	1:16
6.	"Hell No!"	Danielle Brooks; The Color Purple ensemble	3:10
7.	"Shug Avery"	Fantasia; Colman Domingo; The Color Purple ensemble	3:16
8.	"Dear God – Shug"	Fantasia	1:19
9.	"Push Da Button"	Taraji P. Henson	4:22
10.	"What About Love?"	Fantasia; Taraji P. Henson	2:31
11.	"Agoo"	The Color Purple ensemble	1:23
12.	"Hell No!" (Reprise)	Fantasia	1:47
13.	"Miss Celie's Blues" (Sister)	Taraji P. Henson	2:27
14.	"Miss Celie's Pants"	Fantasia; Danielle Brooks; Taraji P. Henson; H.E.R.; The Color Purple ensemble	2:58
15.	"I'm Here"	Fantasia	4:51
16.	"Maybe God Is Tryin' To Tell You Somethin'"	Taraji P. Henson; David Alan Grier	2:10
17.	"The Color Purple"	Fantasia; Danielle Brooks; Taraji P. Henson; Ciara; Corey Hawkins; Colman Domingo; The Color Purple ensemble	3:55
18.	"Superpower" (I)	Fantasia	4:30
Total length:			52:21

== The Color Purple (Music from and Inspired By) ==
The Color Purple (Music from and Inspired By)

Soundtrack album by various artists
- Released: December 15, 2023
- Genre: Film soundtrack
- Length: 120:14
- Labels: WaterTower; Gamma
- Producers: Quincy Jones; Scott Sanders; Larry Jackson

Singles from The Color Purple (Music from and Inspired By)
- 1. "Lifeline" Released: November 27, 2023; 2. "Risk It All" Released: December 7, 2023

Besides the original soundtrack, an "Inspired by" album was unveiled by the producers featuring contributions from popular artists such as Alicia Keys, Usher, Mörda, Mary J. Blige, Megan Thee Stallion, Jennifer Hudson, Keyshia Cole, Ludmilla, Jorja Smith, Coco Jones, Mary Mary, and Missy Elliott. The album also featured tracks from the first album (1–18) along with the new additions, consisting of around 37 tracks in total.

=== Track listing ===
The Color Purple (Music from and Inspired By) Track listing
No.	Title	Artist(s)/Performer(s)	Length
19.	"Risk It All"	Usher; H.E.R.	3:21
20.	"No Love Lost"	Keyshia Cole	4:45
21.	"Lifeline"	Alicia Keys	3:47
22.	"Finally"	Jorja Smith	4:09
23.	"Keep Pushin'" (Missy Elliott remix)	Halle Bailey	2:28
24.	"When I Can't Do Better"	Mary J. Blige	3:40
25.	"There Will Come a Day"	Celeste	3:44
26.	"Any Worse" (Squeak's Song)	H.E.R.	4:26
27.	"Hell No!" (reprise) (Missy Elliott remix)	Fantasia; Shenseea	2:12
28.	"You See Me"	Coco Jones	3:11
29.	"Workin'" (Timbaland remix)	Corey Hawkins; Black Thought	2:30
30.	"Mysterious Ways" (Mörda remix)	Tamela Mann	4:11
31.	"All I Need"	Jennifer Hudson	5:04
32.	"Hell No!" (Timbaland remix)	Danielle Brooks; Megan Thee Stallion	2:58
33.	"100"	Jane Handcock	3:05
34.	"Eternity"	October London	3:38
35.	"No Time"	Darkchild; Konstance	3:55
36.	"Girls"	V. Bozeman; Dyo; Ludmilla	2:26
37.	"Maybe God Is Tryin' To Tell You Somethin'"	Mary Mary; Taraji P. Henson	4:23
Total length:			120:14

== Charts ==
Chart performance for The Color Purple (Music from and Inspired By)
Chart (2024)	Peak position
UK Soundtrack Albums (Official Charts)	8

== The Color Purple (Original Motion Picture Score) ==
The Color Purple (Original Motion Picture Score)

Film score by Kris Bowers
- Released: December 25, 2023
- Recorded: 2022–2023
- Genre: Film score
- Label: WaterTower
- Producer: Kris Bowers

Kris Bowers chronology
Haunted Mansion (2023)	The Color Purple (2023)	Origin (2024)

The score album to the film composed by Kris Bowers was released by WaterTower Music on December 25, 2023.

== Reception ==
Writing for Soul Bounce, D-Money reviewed the soundtrack, saying "It might all seem a bit overstuffed — and with a runtime nearly as long as the film itself, one could argue that it is — but the hodgepodge approach works in its own way as it offers a little something for everyone to enjoy."

Fred Topel of United Press International said that the songs are "rousing" and the choreography being "energetic" even in serious numbers.

Pete Hammond of Deadline Hollywood wrote "Kris Bowers has provided an underscore that perfectly suits the action but respects the sound legions of fans of the live show will be expecting."

Carla Renate of TheWrap said that Kris Bowers "does a wonderful job of marrying a new score with selections from the Broadway production".

== Accolades ==
Award	Date of ceremony	Category	Nominee(s)	Result	Ref.
African-American Film Critics Association Awards	2024	Best Music	Kris Bowers	Won	
Black Reel Awards	January 16, 2024	Outstanding Original Score	Kris Bowers	Won	
Black Reel Awards	January 16, 2024	Outstanding Original Song	"Keep It Movin'" (Note: (Halle Bailey, Phylicia Pearl Mapsi, Denisia Andrews, Brittany Coney and Morten Ristorp))	Won	
Black Reel Awards	January 16, 2024	Outstanding Original Soundtrack	The Color Purple	Won	
Hollywood Music in Media Awards	November 15, 2023	Original Song — Feature Film	"Keep It Movin'"	Nominated	
Hollywood Music in Media Awards	November 15, 2023	Song — Onscreen Performance (Film)	"Keep It Movin'" (Note: (Halle Bailey and Phylicia Pearl Mapsi))	Nominated	
MTV Video Music Awards	September 10, 2024	Best R&B	"Lifeline" (Note: (Alicia Keys))	Nominated	
NAACP Image Awards	March 16, 2024	Outstanding Original Score for TV/Film	Kris Bowers	Nominated	
NAACP Image Awards	March 16, 2024	Outstanding Soundtrack/Compilation Album	The Color Purple (2023 Original Motion Picture Soundtrack)	Won	
Washington D.C. Area Film Critics Association Awards	December 10, 2023	Best Original Score	Kris Bowers	Nominated	

In December 2023, the score was shortlisted for Best Original Score at the 96th Academy Awards, as well as Best Original Song for "Keep It Movin'" and "Superpower (I)".
