= Lifeline (Alicia Keys song) =

Single by Alicia Keys

from the album The Color Purple (Music From and Inspired By)
- Released: November 27, 2023
- Length: 3:47
- Label: Gamma
- Songwriters: Tom Barnes; Pete Kelleher; Alicia Keys; Ben Kohn; Michael Matosic; Jake Torrey
- Producers: Alicia Keys; Marshmello; Tricky Stewart; TMS

Alicia Keys singles chronology
"Golden Child" (2023)	"Lifeline" (2023)	"Kaleidoscope" (2024)

Music video
- "Lifeline" on YouTube

"Lifeline" is a song by American singer-songwriter Alicia Keys, released by Gamma. on November 27, 2023, as the second single from the soundtrack album to the 2023 film The Color Purple.

The music video, directed by Diane Martel and executive produced by Ashley Greyson, was nominated at the MTV Video Music Award for Best R&B Video in 2024.

== Background and composition ==
After the announcing of The Color Purple directed by Blitz Bazawule, the second film adaptation of the 1982 novel of the same name by Alice Walker after Steven Spielberg's 1985 film, Kris Bowers was named as the composer of the score. On November 27, 2023, the soundtrack's musicians and performers were revealed alongside the publication of "Lifeline" as the second single after "Keep It Movin".

The song is co-written, co-produced by Alicia Keys with Marshmello, Tricky Stewart and production team TMS. It was described by Keys as a "heartfelt ode to the unequivocal comfort emanating from friends, family, and community that holds us up as we face life's challenging moments."

== Promotion and live performances ==
Keys performed the song at The Diary of Alicia Keys 20th anniversary concert at Webster Hall in New York City on December 1, 2023. On December 11, Keys performed the song during a surprise concert at St Pancras railway station in London, United Kingdom. Keys also performed the song live at the 2023 Jingle Bell Ball in London.

== Music video ==
The official music video of the song was published on December 21, 2023. The video, directed by Diane Martel and executive produced by Ashley Greyson, featured scenes with Keys herself and cameo form the film. The video received a nomination at the MTV Video Music Awards for Best R&B Video.

== Charts ==
Chart performance for "Lifeline"
Chart (2024)	Peak position
Suriname (Nationale Top 40)	11
US Adult Pop Airplay (Billboard)	23

== Release history ==
Release history and formats for "Lifeline"
Region	Date	Format(s)	Label(s)	Ref.
Various	November 27, 2023	Digital download; streaming	Gamma; Warner	
Italy	November 29, 2023	Radio airplay	Propeller Recordings	
