= Houston Film Critics Society Awards 2023 =

Annual US film awards ceremony

17th Houston Film Critics Society Awards
- Date: January 22, 2024
- Location: Midtown Arts & Theater Center Houston, Texas
- Presented by: Houston Film Critics Society
- Website: houstonfilmcritics.com

The 17th Houston Film Critics Society Awards were announced on January 22, 2024, at the Midtown Arts & Theater Center Houston (MATCH) in Texas. The nominations were announced on January 9, 2024, with Barbie leading the nominations with ten, followed by Oppenheimer with nine.

The nominees for the Texas Independent Film Award were announced on December 6, 2023.

== Winners and nominees ==
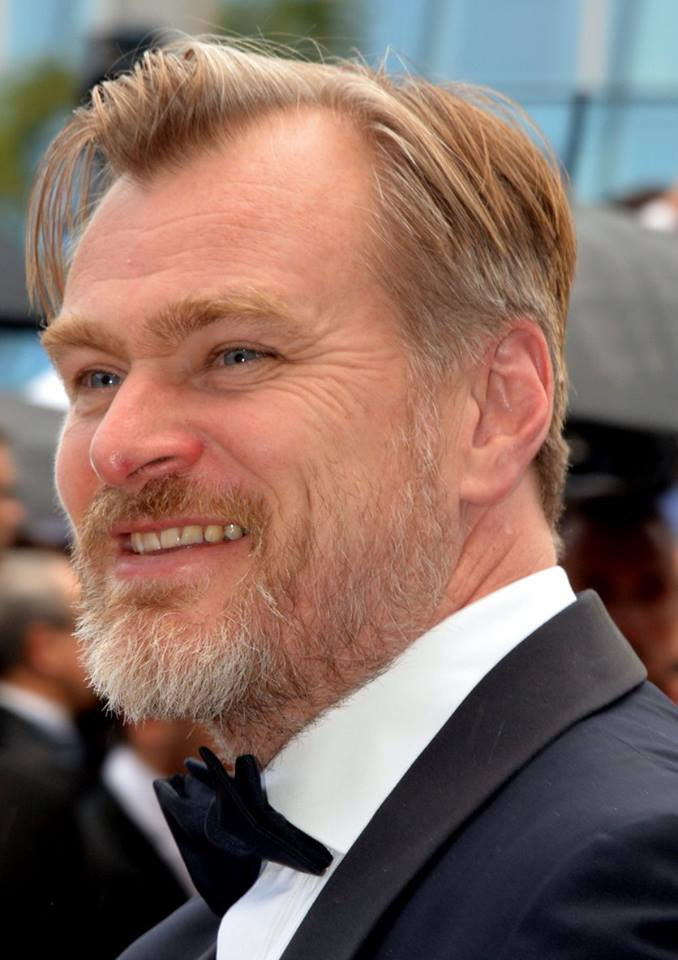
Christopher Nolan, Best Director winner

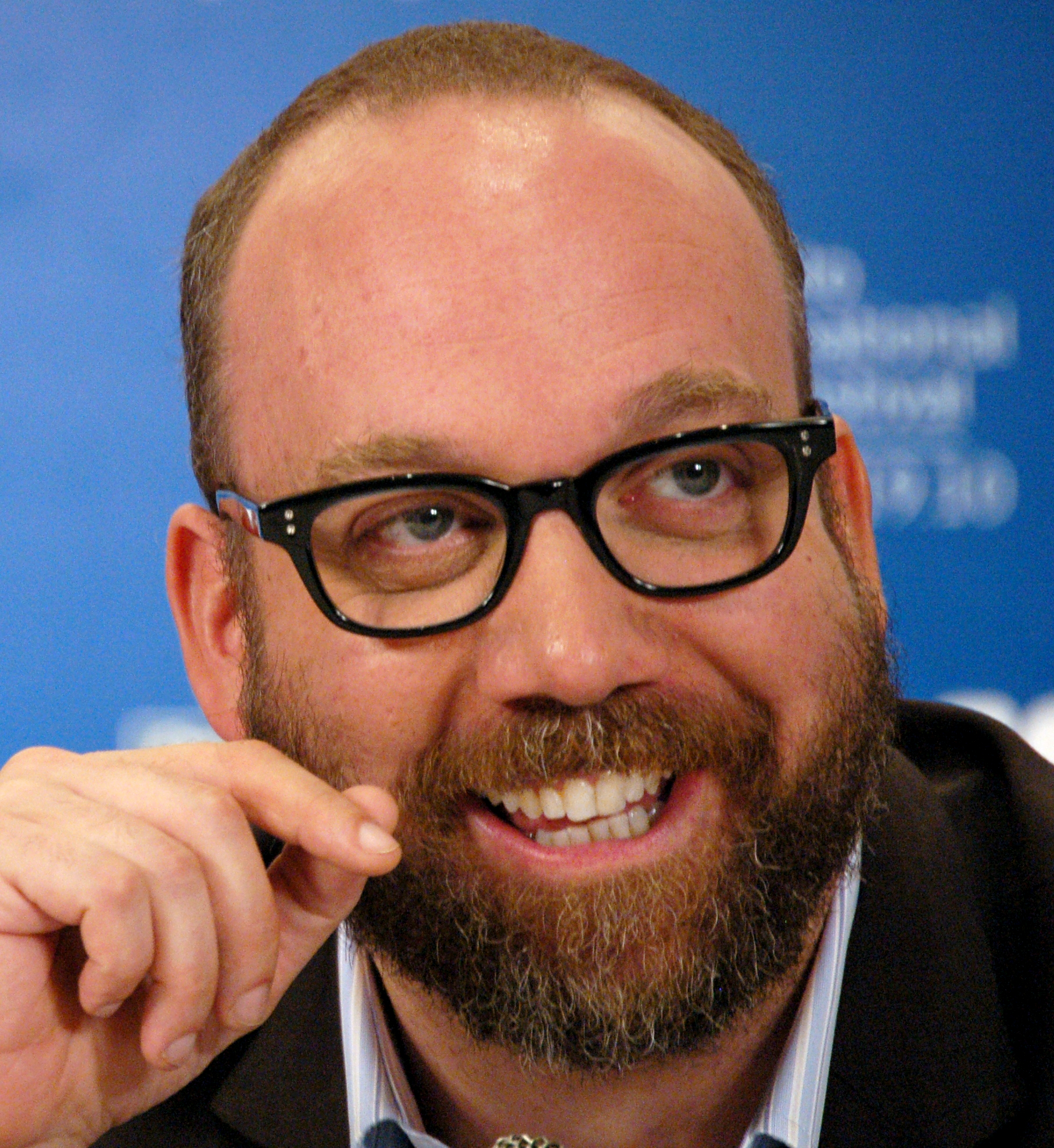
Paul Giamatti, Best Actor winner

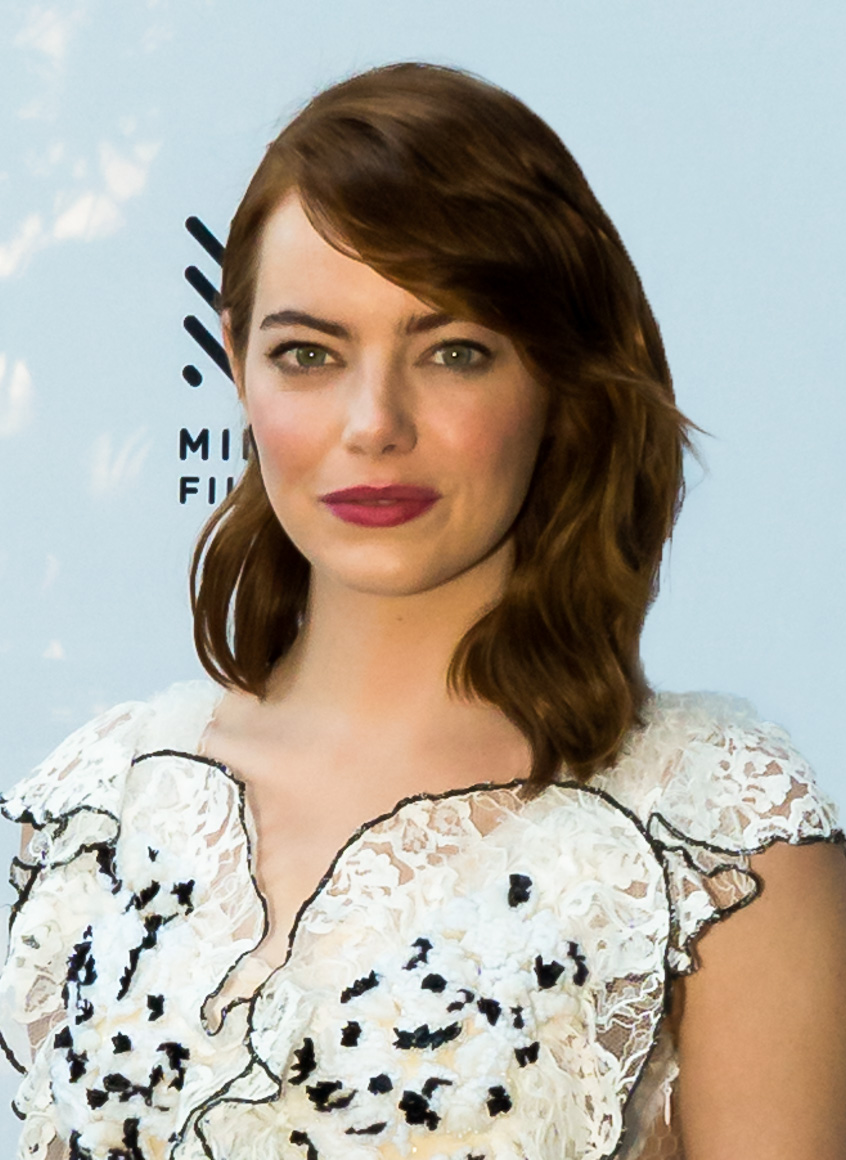
Emma Stone, Best Actress winner

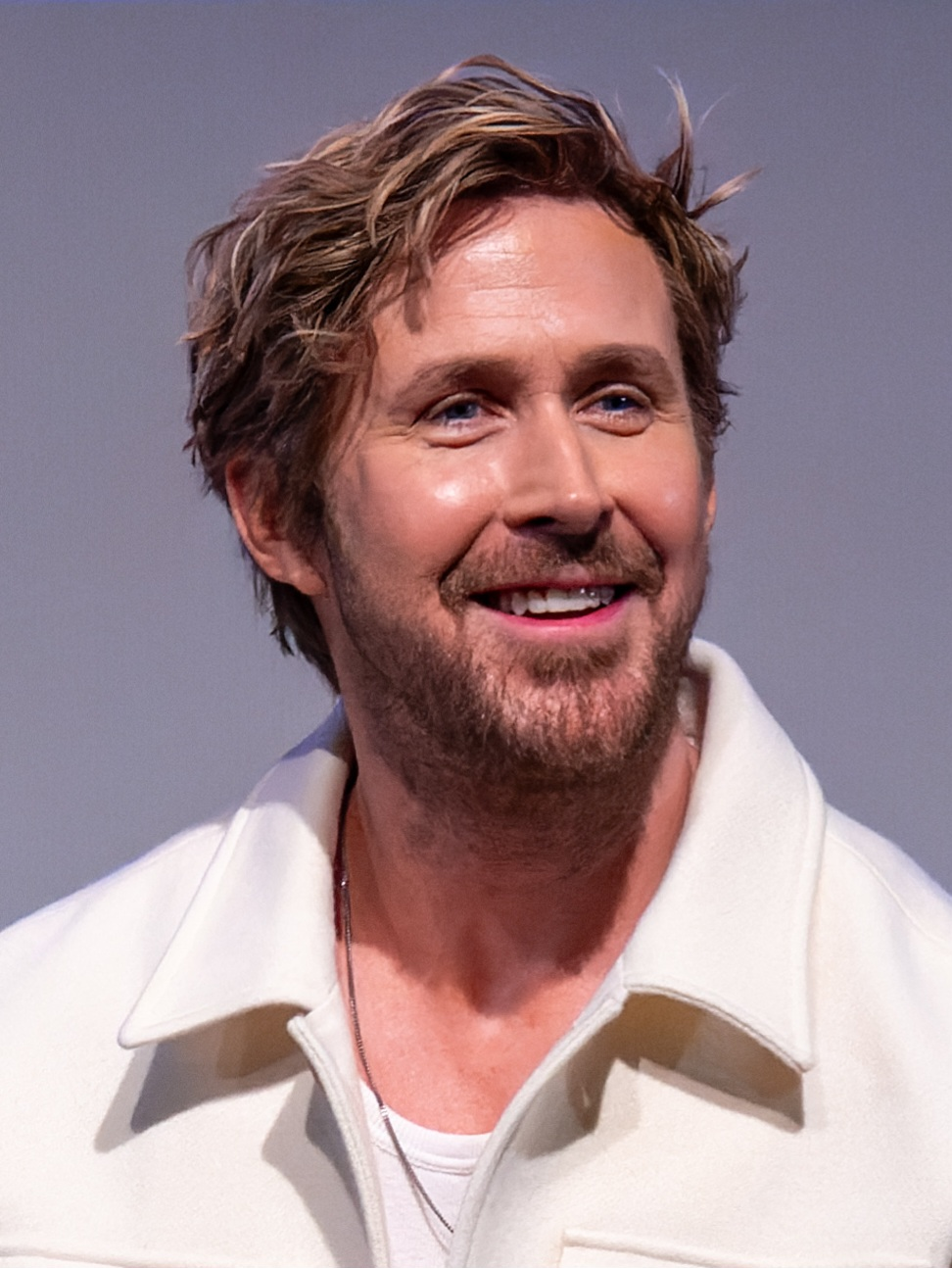
Ryan Gosling, Best Supporting Actor winner

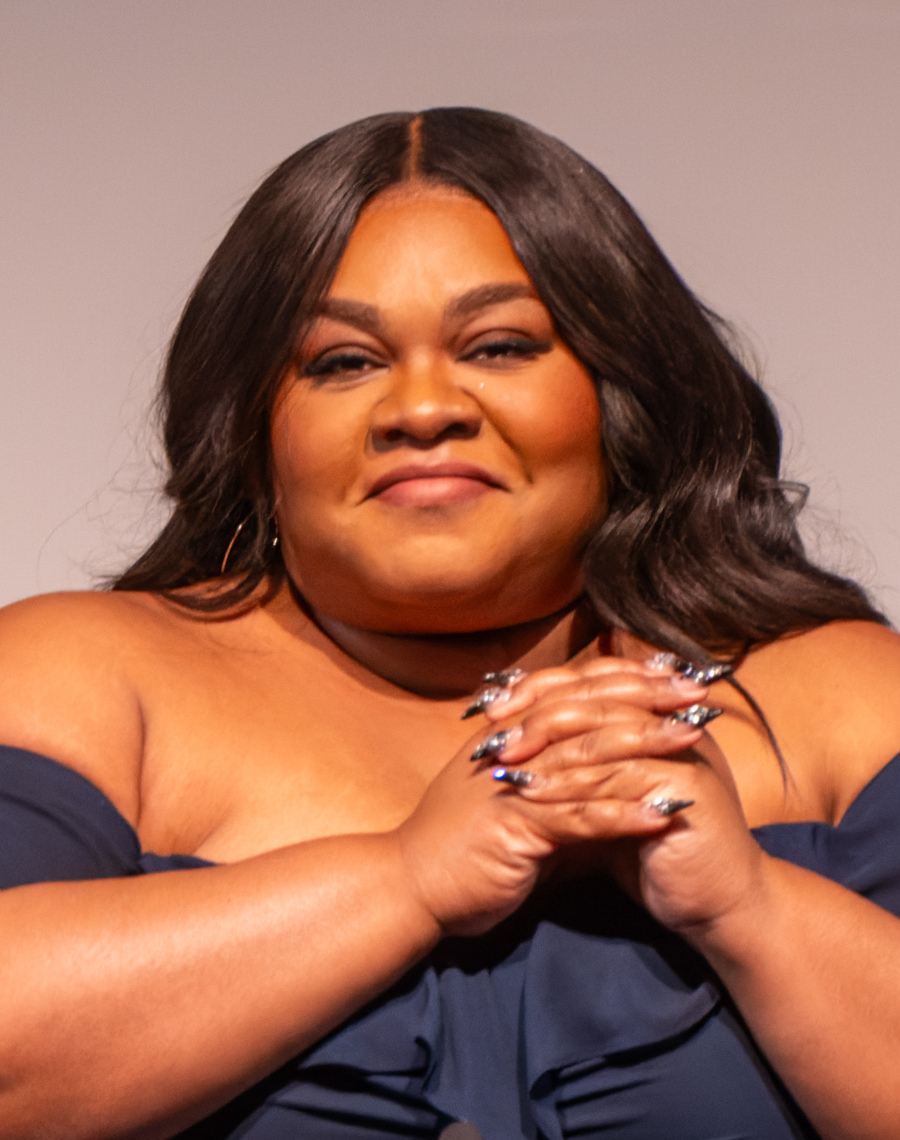
Da'Vine Joy Randolph, Best Supporting Actress winner

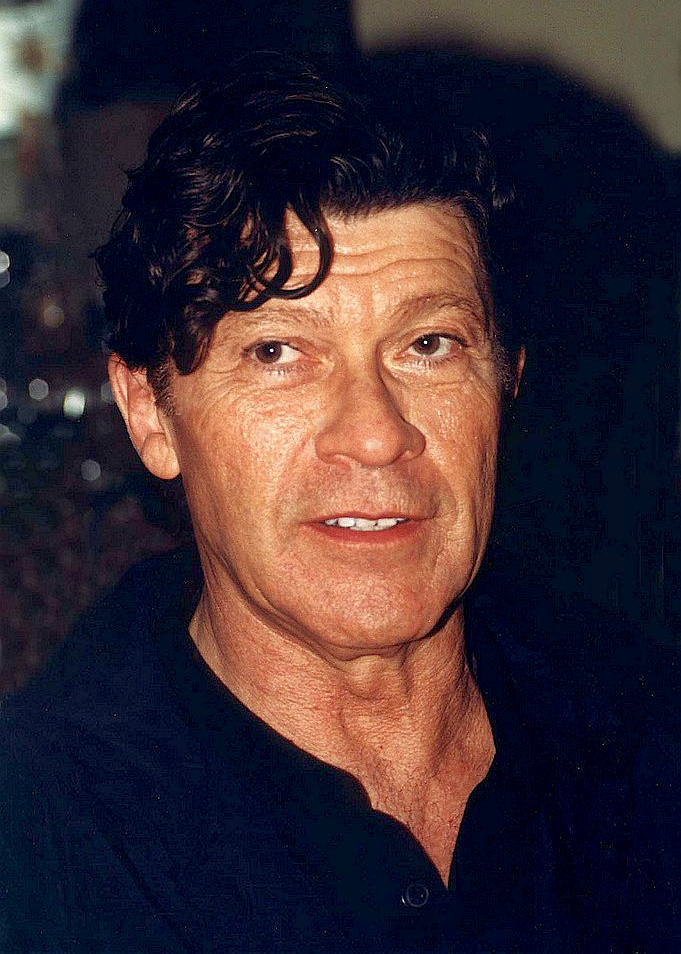
Robbie Robertson, Best Original Score winner

Winners are listed first and highlighted with boldface.

| Best Picture | Best Director |
|---|---|
| **Poor Things**; American Fiction; Are You There God? It's Me, Margaret.; Barbie; The Color Purple; Godzilla Minus One; The Holdovers; Killers of the Flower Moon; Oppenheimer; Past Lives | **Christopher Nolan – Oppenheimer**; Greta Gerwig – Barbie; Yorgos Lanthimos – Poor Things; Alexander Payne – The Holdovers; Martin Scorsese – Killers of the Flower Moon |
| Best Actor | Best Actress |
| **Paul Giamatti – The Holdovers as Paul Hunham**; Leonardo DiCaprio – Killers of the Flower Moon as Ernest Burkhart; Cillian Murphy – Oppenheimer as J. Robert Oppenheimer; Andrew Scott – All of Us Strangers as Adam; Jeffrey Wright – American Fiction as Thelonious "Monk" Ellison | **Emma Stone – Poor Things as Bella Baxter**; Fantasia Barrino – The Color Purple as Celie Harris-Johnson; Lily Gladstone – Killers of the Flower Moon as Mollie Burkhart; Greta Lee – Past Lives as Nora Moon; Margot Robbie – Barbie as Barbie |
| Best Supporting Actor | Best Supporting Actress |
| **Ryan Gosling – Barbie as Ken**; Robert De Niro – Killers of the Flower Moon as William King Hale; Robert Downey Jr. – Oppenheimer as Lewis Strauss; Mark Ruffalo – Poor Things as Duncan Wedderburn; Dominic Sessa – The Holdovers as Angus Tully | **Da'Vine Joy Randolph – The Holdovers as Mary Lamb**; Emily Blunt – Oppenheimer as Kitty Oppenheimer; Danielle Brooks – The Color Purple as Sofia; Rachel McAdams – Are You There God? It's Me, Margaret. as Barbara Simon; Rosamund Pike – Saltburn as Lady Elspeth Catton |
| Best Screenplay | Best Animated Feature |
| **Cord Jefferson – American Fiction**; Greta Gerwig and Noah Baumbach – Barbie; David Hemingson – The Holdovers; Tony McNamara – Poor Things; Christopher Nolan, Kai Bird, and Martin J. Sherwin – Oppenheimer; Celine Song – Past Lives | **Spider-Man: Across the Spider-Verse**; The Boy and the Heron; Nimona; Robot Dreams; Teenage Mutant Ninja Turtles: Mutant Mayhem |
| Best Documentary Feature | Best Foreign Language Feature |
| **Still: A Michael J. Fox Movie**; 20 Days in Mariupol; American Symphony; Beyond Utopia; The Eternal Memory | **The Zone of Interest**; Anatomy of a Fall; Godzilla Minus One; Perfect Days; Society of the Snow |
| Best Original Score | Best Original Song |
| **Robbie Robertson – Killers of the Flower Moon** (posthumous); Jerskin Fendrix – Poor Things; Ludwig Göransson – Oppenheimer; Joe Hisaishi – The Boy and the Heron; Daniel Pemberton – Spider-Man: Across the Spider-Verse | **"I'm Just Ken" – Barbie**; "Dance the Night" – Barbie; "Keep It Movin'" – The Color Purple; "Meet in the Middle" – Flora and Son; "What Was I Made For?" – Barbie |
| Best Cinematography | Best Visual Effects |
| **Hoyte van Hoytema – Oppenheimer**; Rodrigo Prieto – Barbie; Rodrigo Prieto – Killers of the Flower Moon; Robbie Ryan – Poor Things; Linus Sandgren – Saltburn | **Poor Things**; The Creator; Godzilla Minus One; Guardians of the Galaxy Vol. 3; Mission: Impossible – Dead Reckoning Part One |
| Best Ensemble Cast | Best Stunt Coordination Team |
| **Killers of the Flower Moon**; Barbie; The Holdovers; The Iron Claw; Oppenheimer | **John Wick: Chapter 4**; Guardians of the Galaxy Vol. 3; The Iron Claw; Mission: Impossible – Dead Reckoning Part One; Polite Society |
Texas Independent Film Award
**Chocolate Lizards: Mark Lambert Bristol imagines a failed actor's next steps in Buffalo Gap**; Bolivar: Nell Teare explores a young woman's journey to recover from her mother's death; Breaking the Code: Michael Flanagan revisits the work and life of artist Vernon Fisher of Fort Worth; I'll Be There: Andrew Shea considers how people search for connection in the midst of chaos; A Town Called Victoria: Li Liu examines how people confront how they learn to hate
