= Black Reel Award for Outstanding Original Song =

Motion picture award for music

- Country: United States
- Presented by: The Black Reel Awards (BRAs)
- First award: Black Reel Awards of 2001
- Most recent winner: Halle Bailey & Phylicia Pearl Mpasi "Keep It Movin'" (Black Reel Awards of 2024)
- Website: blackreelawards.com

This article lists the winners and nominees for the Black Reel Award for Outstanding Original Song. It's presented to the performer and songwriters for the best original song written specially for a film. Performers who also wrote the song is credited with one win or nomination.

== History ==
This award was first introduced as Outstanding Original or Adapted song from 2001 - 2013. At the 14th Annual Black Reel Awards the category was renamed to Outstanding Original Song only allowing original songs written specifically for a film to be eligible.

This award was first presented at the 2nd Annual Black Reel Awards where Meshell Ndegeocello's "Fool of Me" from Love & Basketball won.

John Legend holds the record with the most wins as both a performer and songwriter with 3 wins. Legend is the most nominated songwriter in this category with 6 nominations and tied with Beyonce for the most nominations as a performer with 5 nominations.

Other multiple winners in this category includes Raphael Saadiq, Mary J. Blige & Common (rapper).

Love & Basketball, The Brothers, Brown Sugar, Dreamgirls, The Princess and the Frog, The Butler, Creed, Black Panther, Queen & Slim & The Harder They Fall are the only films to receive 2 or more nominations in this category. The Butler, Creed & The Harder They Fall are the only films to not have one of their songs win.

== Winners and nominees ==
Winners are listed first and highlighted in bold.

=== 2000s ===
Year	Artist	Writers	Song	Film	Ref
2001
2001	**Meshell Ndegeocello**	**Meshell Ndegeocello** and **Federico Peña**	**"Fool of Me"**	**Love & Basketball**	
2001	Destiny's Child	Beyoncé, Cory Rooney, Tone (as Samuel J. Barnes) and Poke (as Jean Claude Olivier)	"Independent Women"	Charlie's Angels	
2001	Janet Jackson	Janet Jackson, Jimmy Jam and Terry Lewis	"Doesn't Really Matter"	Nutty Professor II: The Klumps	
2001	Donell Jones	Rahsaan Patterson and Steve 'Silk' Hurley	"I'll Go"	Love & Basketball	
2001	R. Kelly	R. Kelly	"Bad Man"	Shaft	
2001	Lucy Pearl	Dawn Robinson and Raphael Saadiq	"Dance Tonight"	Love & Basketball	
2002
2002	**Eric Benét**	**Eric Benet**	**"Love Don't Love Me"**	**The Brothers**	
2002	Snoop Dogg, Tyrese Gibson and Mr. Tan	Battlecat, Tyrese Gibson, Snoop Dogg and Olan Thompson	"Just a Baby Boy"	Baby Boy	
2002	R. Kelly	R. Kelly	"The World's Greatest"	Ali	
2002	Nelly	Nelly and Waiel Yaghnam	"#1"	Training Day	
2002	R.L.	Charles Bereal, Kenneth Bereal & Walter Worth Milsap	"Good Love"	The Brothers	
2003
2003	**Erykah Badu and Common**	**Raphael Saadiq, Erykah Badu, Madukwu Chinwah, Common, Bobby Ozuna, James Poyser and Glenn Standridge**	**"Love of My Life (An Ode to Hip-Hop)"**	**Brown Sugar**	
2003	Beyoncé	Pharrell Williams, Chad Hugo and Beyoncé	"Work It Out"	Austin Powers in Goldmember	
2003	Bow Wow, Jermaine Dupri, Fabolous and Fundisha	Jimmy Bralower, Robert Ford, Full Force, James B. Moor, Kurtis Blow, Shirley Walker and William Waring	"Basketball"	Like Mike	
2003	Bootsy Collins, Snoop Dogg, Mr. Kane, Quaze and Fred Wesley	George Clinton, Bootsy Collins, Jerome Brailey, Snoop Dogg and Quazedelic	"Undercova Funk (Give Up the Funk)"	Undercover Brother	
2003	Angie Stone	Angie Stone, Homer Talbert and Herscholt Polk	"Bring Me Your Heart"	Brown Sugar	
2004
2004	**Beyoncé and Walter Williams Sr.**	**Jimmy Jam, Terry Lewis and Big Jim Wright**	**"He Still Loves Me"**	**The Fighting Temptations**	
2004	Amerie and LL Cool J	Norma Jean Wright, Allan Wayne Felder, Kenneth Burke, LL Cool J, Poke (as Jean Claude Olivier), Tone (as Samuel Barnes), Amerie and 50 Cent	"Paradise"	Deliver Us from Eva	
2004	Joe Budden	Joe Budden, Justin Smith, George Funky Brown, Robert Kool Bell, Ronald Bell, Robert Spike Mickens, Claydes Smith, Richard Westfield, Dennis 'Dee Tee' Thomas	"Pump It Up"	2 Fast 2 Furious	
2004	Ludacris	Ludacris (as Christopher Bridges), Keith McMasters	"Act a Fool"	2 Fast 2 Furious	
2004	Notorious B.I.G. and Tupac Shakur	Tupac Shakur, The Notorious B.I.G., Eminem, Luis Resto, Edgar Winter	"Runnin' (Dying to Live)"	Tupac: Resurrection	
2005–06	—N/a				
2007
2007	**Jennifer Hudson**	**Henry Krieger and Tom Eyen**	**"And I'm Telling You (I'm Not Going)"**	**Dreamgirls**	
2007	Beyoncé	Henry Krieger, Scott Cutler, Beyoncé, and Anne Preven	"Listen"	Dreamgirls	
2007	Jennifer Hudson	Henry Krieger and Tom Eyen	"I Am Changing"	Dreamgirls	
2007	Lyfe Jennings and Alicia Keys	Curtis Mayfield	"People Get Ready"	Glory Road	
2007	OutKast	Andre Benjamin	"Idlewild Blue (Don'tchu Worry 'Bout Me)"	Idlewild	
2008	—N/a				

=== 2010s ===
Year	Artist	Writers	Song	Film	Ref
2010
2010	**Anika Noni Rose**	**Randy Newman**	**"Almost There"**	**The Princess and the Frog**	
2010	De'Adre Aziza, Daniel Breaker and Stew	Stew	"Keys"	Passing Strange	
2010	Mary J. Blige	Mary J. Blige, Ne-Yo & Chuck Harmon	"I Can Do Bad All By Myself"	I Can Do Bad All By Myself	
2010	Ne-Yo	Ne-Yo	"Never Knew I Needed"	The Princess and the Frog	
2010	Anika Noni Rose	Randy Newman	"Down in New Orleans"	The Princess and the Frog	
2011
2011	**John Legend**	**John Legend**	**"Shine"**	**Waiting for "Superman"**	
2011	Justin Bieber and Jaden Smith	Adam Messinger, Nasri, Justin Bieber, Kuk Harrell (as Thaddis Harrell), Jaden Smith and Omarr Rambert	"Never Say Never"	The Karate Kid	
2011	Jay Z, Rihanna and Kanye West	Shawn Carter, Kanye West, Robyn Fenty, Ernest Wilson, Jeff Bhasker, Athanasios Alatas	"Run This Town"	Brooklyn's Finest	
2011	Queen Latifah	Andre Lyon, Queen Latifah, Jazmine Sullivan and Marcello Valenzano	"Champion"	Just Wright	
2011	Leona Lewis	Greg Barnhill, Joanna Cotten and Melissa Manchester	"I Know Who I Am"	For Colored Girls	
2012
2012	**Mary J. Blige**	**Mary J. Blige, Thomas Newman, Harvey Mason Jr. and Damon Thomas**	**"The Living Proof"**	**The Help**	
2012	Nicole Beharie	Scott Jacoby, Stefan C. Schaefer & Chris Silber	"My Last Day Without You"	My Last Day Without You	
2012	Jamie Foxx	Siedah Garrett	"Fly Love"	Rio	
2012	Cee-Lo Green and Kenny Wayne Shepherd	R.L. Burnside	"Walkin' Blues"	Footloose	
2012	Ludacris and Slaughterhouse	Ryan Montgomery, Crooked I, Eminem, Joe Budden, Joell Ortiz, Ludacris, Mr. Porter, Tony "56" Jackson, Claret Jai, Luis Resto	"Furiously Dangerous"	Fast Five	
2013
2013	**John Legend**	**John Legend**	**"Who Did That to You?"**	**Django Unchained**	
2013	Travis Barker, Tom Morello, Raekwon and RZA	Travis Barker, Tom Morello, Raekwon and RZA	"Carry It"	The Man with the Iron Fists	
2013	Whitney Houston and Jordin Sparks	R. Kelly	"Celebrate"	Sparkle	
2013	Jay Z, Frank Ocean and Kanye West	Kanye West, Jay-Z (as Shawn Carter), Mike Dean, Charles Njapa, Gary Wright, Phil Manzanera, James Brown, Joseph Maloy Roach, The-Dream (as Terius Nash), Frank Ocean	"No Church in the Wild"	Safe House	
2013	John Legend and Ludacris	John Legend, Allen Arthur, Ludacris, Clayton Reilly, Keith Justice, and Miguel	"Tonight (Best You Ever Had)"	Think Like a Man	
2014
2014	**Judith Hill**	Judith Hill	**"Desperation"**	**20 Feet from Stardom**	
2014	Fantasia Barrino	Keith McMasters, Fantasia Barrino, Ricco Barrino, and Abel Terry	"In the Middle of the Night"	The Butler	
2014	Alicia Keys	Alicia Keys	"Queen of the Field (Patsey's Song)"	12 Years a Slave	
2014	Gladys Knight	Lenny Kravitz	"You & I Ain't No More"	The Butler	
2014	Pharrell Williams	Pharrell Williams	"Happy"	Despicable Me 2	
2015
2015	**Common and John Legend**	**Common, John Legend & Rhymefest**	**"Glory"**	**Selma**	
2015	Eliza Colby and Questlove	Eliza Colby & Questlove	"It Ain't Easy"	Top Five	
2015	Alicia Keys and Kendrick Lamar	Pharrell Williams, Alicia Keys, Hans Zimmer and Kendrick Lamar	"It's On Again"	The Amazing Spider-Man 2	
2015	Janelle Monáe	Janelle Monáe, Nate 'Rocket' Wonder and Roman GianArthur Irvin	"What is Love"	Rio 2	
2015	Rita Ora	Diane Warren	"Grateful"	Beyond the Lights	
2016
2016	**Wiz Khalifa and Charlie Puth**	**DJ Frank E, Andrew Cedar, Charlie Puth, Wiz Khalifa**	**"See You Again"**	**Furious 7**	
2016	Jhené Aiko, Childish Gambino and Vince Staples	Ludwig Göransson, Ryan Coogler, Vince Staples and Donald Glover	"Waiting for My Moment"	Creed	
2016	Dr. Dre	Dr. Dre, Slim the Mobster, Mario Johnson, Russell Brown	"Talking to My Diary"	Straight Outta Compton	
2016	Tessa Thompson	Ludwig Göransson, Sam Dew and Tessa Thompson	"Grip"	Creed	
2016	The Weeknd	The Weeknd, Stephan Moccio, DaHeala, Belly	"Earned It"	Fifty Shades of Grey	
2017
2017	**Sharon Jones & the Dap-Kings**	**Sharon Jones & The Dap-Kings**	**"I'm Still Here"**	**Miss Sharon Jones!**	
2017	Common and Bilal	Common, Karriem Riggins & Robert Glasper	"A Letter to the Free"	13th	
2017	Alicia Keys	Alicia Keys, Illangelo, Billy Walsh	"Back to Life"	Queen of Katwe	
2017	John Legend	John Legend	"Start"	Southside with You	
2017	Lalah Hathaway and Pharrell Williams	Pharrell Williams	"Surrender"	Hidden Figures	
2018
2018	**Mary J. Blige**	**Mary J. Blige, Raphael Saadiq & Taura Stinson**	**"Mighty River"**	**Mudbound**	
2018	Kortnee Price	Jypsy Nichols, Jeff Paige, Bobby Huntley & Nikki Wade	"Best of Me"	La Vie Magnifique De Charlie	
2018	Cynthia Erivo	Raphael Saadiq, Taura Stinson & Laura Karpman	"Jump"	Step	
2018	Common and Andra Day	Dianne Warren & Common	"Stand Up for Something"	Marshall	
2018	Phonte and Zo!	Phonte & Zo!	"Starlight"	Zo! Making SkyBreak	
2019
2019	**Kendrick Lamar & SZA**	Kendrick Lamar, Sounwave, Al Shux and SZA	**"All the Stars"**	**Black Panther**	
2019	Jennifer Hudson	Diane Warren	"I’ll Fight"	RBG	
2019	Khalid & Normani	Khalid, Normani, Ryan Vojtesak, Tayla Parx and Jamil Chammas	"Love Lies"	Love, Simon	
2019	The Weeknd & Kendrick Lamar	The Weeknd, Kendrick Lamar, Frank Dukes and Doc McKinney	"Pray for Me"	Black Panther	
2019	Arlissa	Jessica Karpov, Kevin White and Mike Woods	"We Won’t Move"	The Hate U Give	

=== 2020s ===
Year	Artist	Writers	Song	Film	Ref
2020
2020	**Tiana Major9** and **EarthGang**	**Olu Fann, Sonyae Elise, Stacy Barthe, Benny Cassette, Sam Barsh, Kaveh Rastegar, Akil King, and Joshua Lopez**	**"Collide"**	**Queen & Slim**	
2020	Lauryn Hill	Lauryn Hill	"Guarding the Gates"	Queen & Slim	
2020	Robert Glasper and Ledisi	Robert Glasper	"Don’t Turn Back Now"	The Apollo	
2020	Beyoncé	Ilya Salmanzadeh, Labrinth, and Beyoncé	"Spirit"	The Lion King	
2020	Gizzle and Sam Fischer	Gizzle, Mike Sabath, and Sam Fischer	"It’s Not Over"	Brian Banks	
2021
2021	**Leslie Odom Jr.**	**Leslie Odom Jr. & Sam Ashworth**	**"Speak Now"**	**One Night in Miami...**	
2021	H.E.R.	H.E.R., Tiara Thomas & D'Mile	"Fight for You"	Judas and the Black Messiah	
2021	Anika Noni Rose & Forest Whitaker	John Legend	"Make It Work"	Jingle Jangle: A Christmas Journey	
2021	Radha Blank	Radha Blank	"Poverty Porn"	The Forty-Year-Old Version	
2021	Andra Day	Andra Day, Raphael Saadiq	"Tigress & Tweed"	The United States vs. Billie Holiday	
2022
2022	**H.E.R.**	**H.E.R., Van Hunt, Brittany Hazzard**	**"Automatic Woman"**	**Bruised**	
2022	Beyoncé	Beyoncé & DIXSON	"Be Alive"	King Richard	
2022	Jay-Z & Kid Cudi	Shawn "Jay-Z" Carter, Kid Cudi & Jeymes Samuel	"Guns Go Bang"	The Harder They Fall	
2022	Koffee	Shawn "Jay-Z" Carter & Jeymes Samuel	"The Harder They Fall"	The Harder They Fall	
2022	Jennifer Hudson	Jennifer Hudson, Carole King & Jamie Hartman	"Here I Am (Singing My Way Home)"	Respect	
2023
2023	**Rihanna**	**Rihanna, Ryan Coogler, Ludwig Göransson and Tems**	**"Lift Me Up"**	**Black Panther: Wakanda Forever**	
2023	Rihanna	Rihanna, The-Dream, Ludwig Göransson and James Fauntleroy	"Born Again"	Black Panther: Wakanda Forever	
2023	Jessy Wilson and Angélique Kidjo	Jesy Wilson, Angélique Kidjo and Jeremy Lutito	"Keep Rising"	The Woman King	
2023	Ruth B	Ruth B. and Terence Blanchard	"Paper Airplanes"	A Jazzman's Blues	
2023	Jazmine Sullivan	Jazmine Sullivan and D'Mile	"Stand Up"	Till	
2024
2024	**Halle Bailey and Phylicia Pearl Maspi**	**Halle Bailey, Denisia Andrews, Brittany Coney and Morten Ristorp**	**"Keep It Movin"**	**The Color Purple**	
2024	Metro Boomin, ASAP Rocky and Roisee	Leland Tyler Wayne, Roisee, Rakim Mayers, Mike Dean, Peter Lee Johnson and Landon "Script" Wayne	"Am I Dreaming"	Spider-Man: Across the Spider-Verse	
2024	Jon Batiste		"It Never Went Away"	American Symphony	
2024	Beyoncé	Beyoncé Knowles and The-Terius "The-Dream" Adamu Ya Gesteelde-Diamant	"MY HOUSE"	Renaissance: A Film by Beyoncé	
2024	Lenny Kravitz		"Road to Freedom"	Rustin	
2025
2025	**H.E.R**	**Diane Warren**	**"The Journey"**	**The Six Triple Eight**	
2025	Andra Day	Andra Day and Jherek Bischoff	"Bricks"	Exhibiting Forgiveness	
2025	Zoe Saldaña, Karla Sofía Gascón and Camille	Clément Ducol, Camille and Jacques Audiard	"El Mal"	Emilia Pérez	
2025	Adrian Quesada and Abraham Alexander	Adrian Quesada, Abraham Alexander and Brandon Marcel	"Like a Bird"	Sing Sing	
2025	Pharrell Williams and Princess Anne High School	Pharrell Williams	"Piece by Piece"	Piece by Piece	

== Multiple nominations and wins (Performer) ==
=== Multiple wins ===
3 Wins

- John Legend

2 Wins

- Common
- Mary J. Blige

=== Multiple nominations ===
7 Nominations

- Beyoncé

5 Nominations

- John Legend
- Pharrell Williams

4 Nominations

- Common
- Jennifer Hudson
- Alicia Keys
- Jay Z

3 Nominations

- Mary J. Blige
- Andra Day
- H.E.R.
- Ludacris
- Kendrick Lamar
- Anika Noni Rose
- Rihanna

2 Nominations

- Joe Budden
- Snoop Dogg
- The Weeknd
- R. Kelly
- Kanye West

== Multiple nominations and wins (Songwriter) ==
=== Multiple wins ===
3 Wins

- John Legend

2 Wins

- Common
- Mary J. Blige
- Raphael Saadiq

=== Multiple nominations ===
6 Nominations

- Beyoncé
- John Legend

5 Nominations

- Common
- Raphael Saadiq
- Pharrell Williams

4 Nominations

- Jay Z
- Diane Warren

3 Nominations

- Mary J. Blige
- Henry Krieger
- Alicia Keys
- Ludacris
- Kendrick Lamar
- R. Kelly
- Rihanna

2 Nominations

- Joe Budden
- D'Mile
- Snoop Dogg
- The-Dream
- Eminem
- Tom Eyen
- Ludwig Goransson
- H.E.R.
- Jimmy Jam
- Ne-Yo
- Terry Lewis
- Randy Newman
- R. Kelly
- Jeymes Samuel
- Taura Stinson
- The Weeknd
- Kanye West
