= Phylicia Pearl Mpasi =

American actress

- Born: November 16; Silver Spring, Maryland, U.S.
- Education: Elon University (BFA)
- Known for: The Color Purple

Phylicia Pearl Mpasi (born November 16) is an American actress and writer. She began her career by performing in the broadway production of The Lion King. Mpasi made her film debut as Celie Harris-Johnson in the 2023 version of The Color Purple, being recognized with an NAACP Image Awards for her performance and being nominated with the cast at the Screen Actors Guild Awards and Critics' Choice Movie Awards.

== Early life and education ==
Phylicia Pearl Mpasi was born in Silver Spring, Maryland, and is the daughter of immigrants from the Democratic Republic of the Congo. She identifies as Black and Congolese-American. Growing up, she sang in her church choir.

She attended Our Lady of Good Counsel Catholic High School in Olney, Maryland. She then went on to complete her undergraduate studies at Elon University, where she graduated from the theater program. While at Elon, the musical version of The Color Purple was part of the program's curriculum.

== Career ==
Mpasi began her career in theater, performing in various roles in The Lion King musical on Broadway and on tour. During the pandemic, she began creating YouTube videos. She then pivoted to television writing, working on the television show Grease: Rise of the Pink Ladies and the HBO scripted podcast We Stay Looking starring Terri J. Vaughn.

In 2021, she initially auditioned for the role of adult Celie for the film adaptation of the musical The Color Purple. After the role went to Fantasia Barrino, Mpasi went on to audition for the role of young Celie, which she was awarded with the NAACP Image Award for Outstanding Breakthrough Performance in a Motion Picture. Mpasi also performed the original song "Keep It Movin'" with Halle Bailey, winning the Black Reel Award for Outstanding Original Song.

== Personal life ==
Mpasi is Catholic.

== Filmography ==
=== Film ===
Year	Title	Role	Notes
2023	The Color Purple	Young Celie	Film debut

=== Theater ===
Year	Title	Role	Notes
Unknown	The Lion King	Various	Broadway; National Tour

== Discography ==
Title	Year	Other artist(s)	Album
"Keep It Movin'"	2023	Halle Bailey	The Color Purple (Original Motion Picture Soundtrack)
"Huckleberry Pie"	2023	Halle Bailey	The Color Purple (Original Motion Picture Soundtrack)
"Mysterious Ways"	2023	The Color Purple Ensemble	The Color Purple (Original Motion Picture Soundtrack)

== Awards and nominations ==
Year	Association	Category	Project	Result	Ref.
2022	Ambies	Best Scriptwriting, Fiction	We Stay Looking	Nominated	
2023	Hollywood Music in Media Awards	Best Song - Onscreen Performance (Film)	"Keep It Movin'"	Nominated	
2023	Hollywood Music in Media Awards	Best Original Song – Feature Film	"Keep It Movin'"	Nominated	
2023	Celebration of Cinema and Television|Celebration of Cinema and Television	Ensemble Award – Film	The Color Purple	Won	
2024	Astra Film and Creative Awards	Best Cast Ensemble	The Color Purple	Won	
2024	Black Reel Awards	Outstanding Breakthrough Performance	The Color Purple	Nominated	
2024	Black Reel Awards	Outstanding Original Song	"Keep It Movin'"	Won	
2024	Critics' Choice Movie Awards	Best Acting Ensemble	The Color Purple	Nominated	
2024	NAACP Image Awards	Outstanding Breakthrough Performance in a Motion Picture	The Color Purple	Won	
2024	NAACP Image Awards	Outstanding Ensemble Cast in a Motion Picture	The Color Purple	Won	
2024	Screen Actors Guild Awards	Outstanding Performance by a Cast in a Motion Picture	The Color Purple	Nominated	
