= La Vie Magnifique De Charlie =

2017 American comedy drama film

- Directed by: Bobby Huntley
- Written by: Nikki Wade; Bobby Huntley
- Produced by: Bobby Huntley; Nikki Wade
- Starring: Kortnee Price; Lailaa Brookings; Nikki Lashae; Ashley S. Evans; Kai N. Ture; Priah Ferguson; Nicole Douglas; Mary Ann la Cue
- Cinematography: Lakisha Hughes
- Edited by: Bobby Huntley
- Music by: Chuckey Charles; Janelle McFarlane; Jypsy Nichols; Jeff Paige
- Production companies: Davenstar1 Entertainment; Divadom Entertainment Group
- Release date: 1 June 2017
- Running time: 87 minutes
- Country: United States
- Language: English

La Vie Magnifique De Charlie is a 2017 American comedy-drama film directed by Bobby Huntley and co-produced by director himself with Nikki Wade. The film stars Kortnee Price, Lailaa Brookings, and Nikki Lashae with Ashley S. Evans, Kai N. Ture, Priah Ferguson, Nicole Douglas, and Mary Ann la Cue in supporting roles. The film has been shot in Atlanta, Georgia. The film premiered on 1 June 2017 in the United States. The film received positive reviews from critics. In 2018 at the Black Reel Awards, the film was nominated for the Outstanding Original Song.

== Cast ==
- Kortnee Price as Charlie
- Lailaa Brookings as Kayla
- Nikki Lashae as Keturah Aka Pandakitty
- Ashley S. Evans as Brandy
- Kai N. Ture as Young Charlie
- Priah Ferguson as Young Brandy
- Nicole Douglas as Brenda
- Mary Ann la Cue as Nana Liza
- Jeffery Chalk Jr. as Julio
- Cecil M. Henry as The Pastor (Chuckie's Father)
- Jacobi Hollingshed as Young Chuckie
- Connie Lane as Aunt Zannalee
- Mary Meyer as Cynthia
- Jennifer Nash as Aunt Dorothy
- Laura Poindexter as Vivian
- Bennett Rodgers as Parker
- Andrea Ryan as Psychiatrist
- Latoya Torre as Sharon
