= The Color Purple (2023 film) =

2023 film by Blitz Bazawule

- Theatrical release poster
- Directed by: Blitz Bazawule
- Screenplay by: Marcus Gardley
- Based on: The Color Purple (2005 musical) by; Brenda Russell; Allee Willis; Stephen Bray; Marsha Norman; The Color Purple (1982 novel) by Alice Walker
- Produced by: Oprah Winfrey; Steven Spielberg; Scott Sanders; Quincy Jones
- Starring: Taraji P. Henson; Danielle Brooks; Colman Domingo; Corey Hawkins; H.E.R. (Note: credited as "Gabrielle Wilson "H.E.R."" in end credits); Halle Bailey; Aunjanue Ellis-Taylor; Phylicia Pearl Mpasi; Fantasia Barrino
- Cinematography: Dan Laustsen
- Edited by: Jon Poll
- Music by: Kris Bowers
- Production companies: Amblin Entertainment; OW Films
- Distributed by: Warner Bros. Pictures
- Release dates: November 20, 2023 (London); December 25, 2023 (United States)
- Running time: 141 minutes
- Country: United States
- Language: English
- Budget: $90–100 million
- Box office: $68.9 million

The Color Purple is a 2023 American musical period drama film directed by Blitz Bazawule, from a screenplay by Marcus Gardley. The film is based upon the stage musical of the same name, itself based upon the 1982 novel by Alice Walker. It is the second film adaptation of the novel, following the 1985 film directed by Steven Spielberg and produced by Spielberg and Quincy Jones. Spielberg and Jones return as producers for the 2023 film, along with its Broadway producers Scott Sanders and Oprah Winfrey, the latter of whom also starred in the 1985 film.

The film stars Taraji P. Henson, Danielle Brooks, Colman Domingo, Corey Hawkins, H.E.R., Halle Bailey, Phylicia Pearl Mpasi, and Fantasia Barrino in her film debut. Brooks and Barrino reprise their roles from the productions of the stage musical. It tells the story of Celie, an African American woman dealing with the hardships of living with an abusive husband and living in the American South during the early 1900s.

The Color Purple premiered in London on November 20, 2023, and was released in the United States on December 25, 2023, by Warner Bros. Pictures. Although it received positive reviews from critics, it grossed $68.9 million against a budget of $90–100 million. Danielle Brooks was lauded for her performance, receiving nominations for the Academy Award, BAFTA Award, Golden Globe Award, and Screen Actors Guild Award for Best Supporting Actress. At the 55th NAACP Image Awards, the film won a record-breaking eleven awards out of sixteen nominations, including Outstanding Motion Picture and acting wins for Barrino, Henson, Domingo, and the ensemble cast.

== Plot ==
In 1909 Georgia, teenager Celie Harris lives with her sister Nettie and abusive father Alfonso. After her mother dies, he starts raping Celie, causing her to become pregnant twice. Alfonso takes away each of the babies, first Olivia and then Adam, shortly after birth. He then forces her to marry a local farmer and father of three, Albert "Mister" Johnson.

When Alfonso tries to molest Nettie, she moves into Mister's farmhouse to be with Celie, but when she rebuffs his sexual advances he banishes her from his land. As she leaves, she promises to write to Celie every day.

By 1917, Celie is still married to Mister. His son Harpo marries fierce, defiant Sofia, and builds a house for her. Celie befriends her, but in a moment of jealousy advises Harpo to beat her. Sofia leaves Harpo as a result, so he converts the house into a juke joint.

Independent jazz singer Shug Avery, Mister's longtime lover, comes to town to perform at the joint and stays at Mister's house for a few days. Around this time, Mister's equally abusive father visits. Harpo has been seeing another woman, who he calls "Squeak". When he tries to dance with Sofia, Squeak cuts in and ends up starting a fight that trashes the joint. Escaping the brawl, Shug takes Celie to see a movie; the two kiss at the movie theatre and sleep together that night.

In the morning, Shug intercepts the mail, finding a letter to Celie from Nettie. The two search the house and discover dozens of other letters from Nettie that Mister hid from Celie. The letters reveal that Nettie has been living in Africa and caring for Adam and Olivia, who were adopted by missionaries.

In 1930, the mayor's wife condescendingly offers Sofia a job as her maid; when Sofia refuses, she gets involved in a physical fight, resulting in her arrest. She is released after six years and ends up having to work for the mayor's wife regardless, sinking into a deep depression that seemingly takes away all of her fierceness.

On Easter Sunday in 1943, when Shug and her new husband Grady are visiting, Celie confronts Mister in front of his father and their family. She leaves him and moves to Memphis with Shug. Squeak, whose real name is Mary Agnes, goes with them, inspiring Sofia out of her stupor. Celie vows to Mister that until he does right by her, everything in his life will crumble.

In 1945, when Alfonso dies, his wife reveals to Celie that he was not Celie or Nettie's biological father, and the sisters now own the grocery store and the home they were brought up in. Celie moves back to Georgia and becomes a tailor, selling pants in the former grocery store. Meanwhile, Mister has become a miserable drunk. He vows to do right by Celie and plots to reunite Celie and Nettie, selling some of his land to pay for Nettie to return from Africa. Later he visits her shop and buys a pair of pants; while she is hesitant to see him, she agrees to maintain a friendship with him.

In 1947, Celie reunites with Nettie, along with Adam and Olivia. She joins hands with them as she and everyone else thank God for how far they have come.

== Cast ==
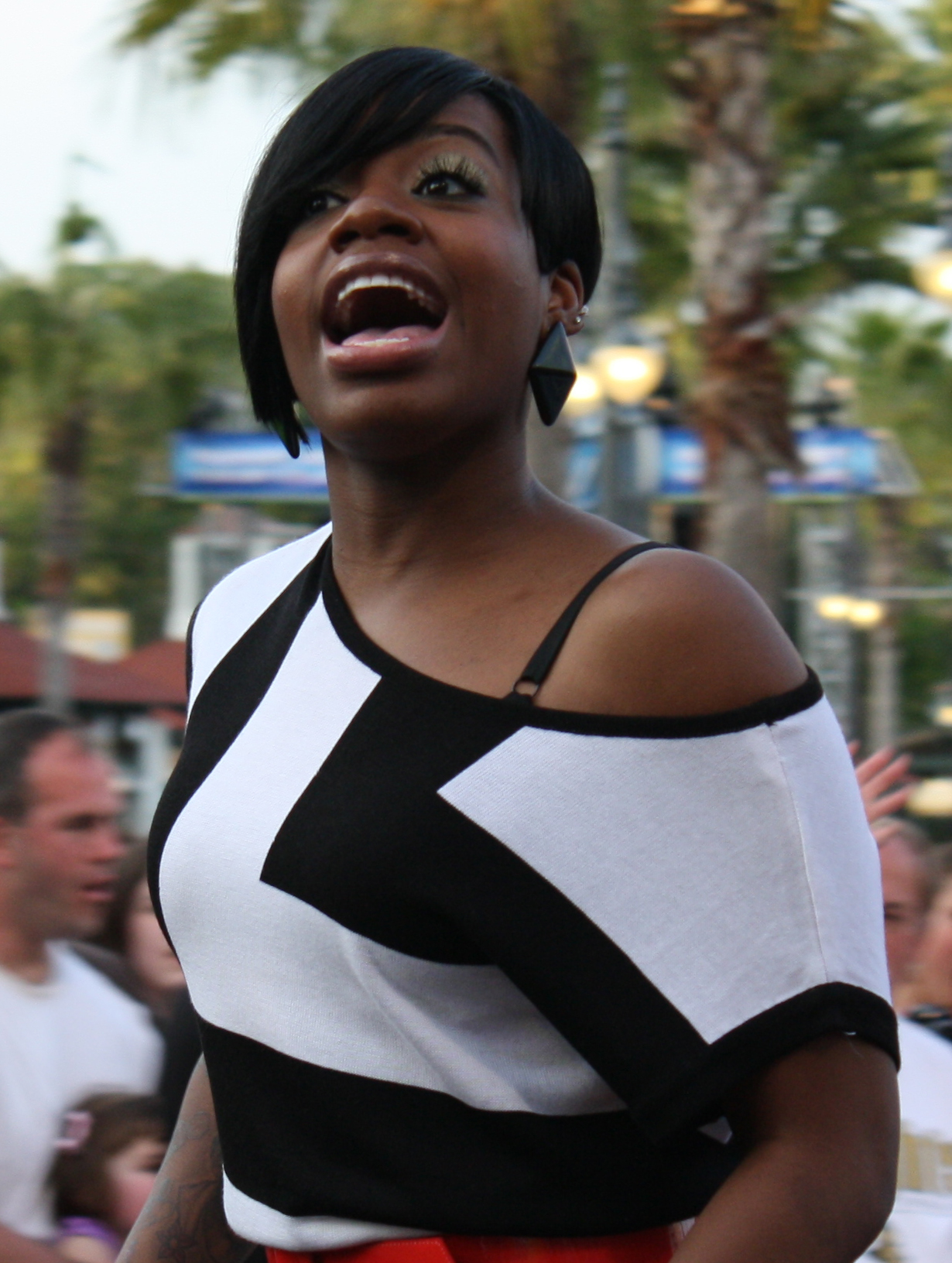
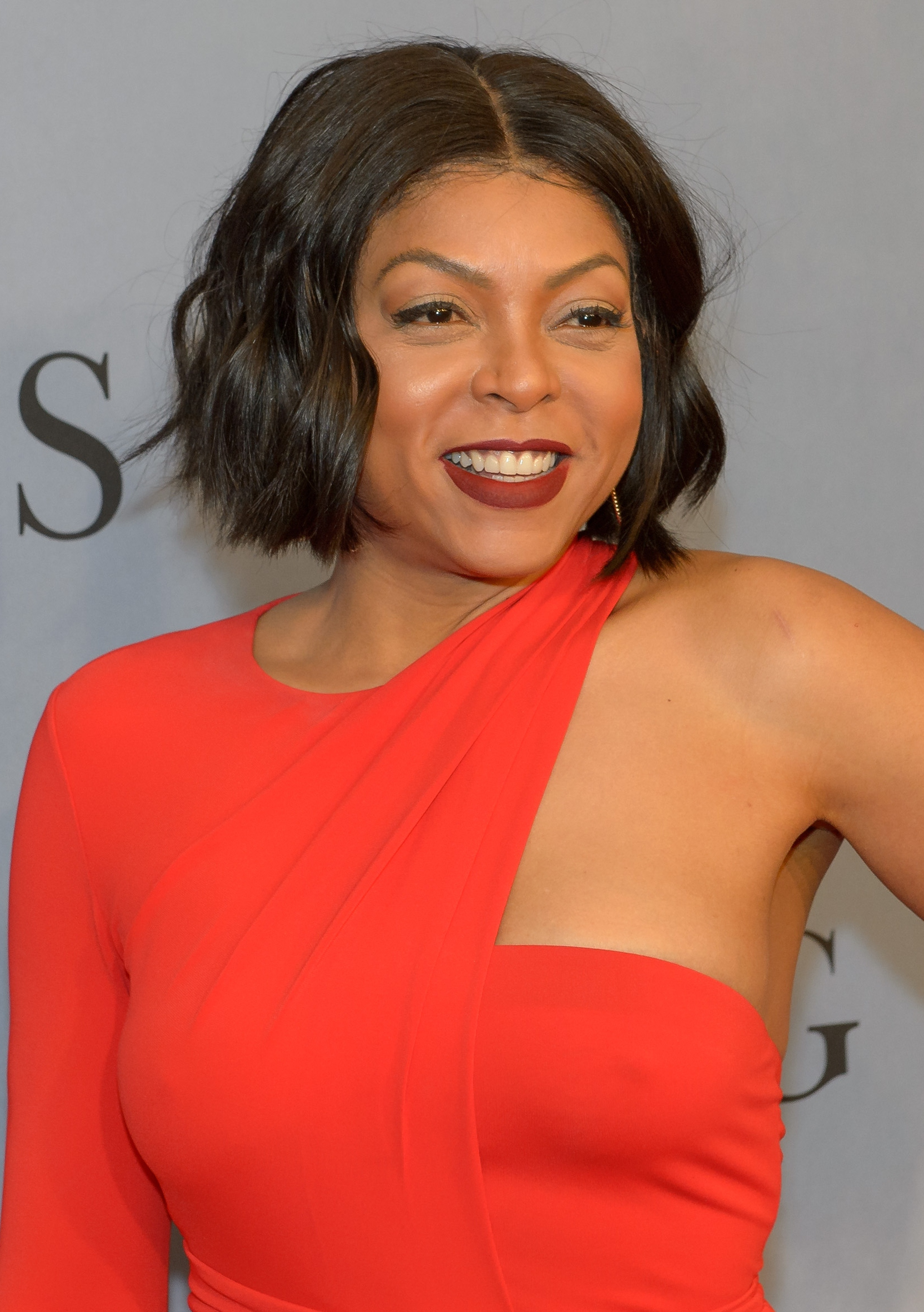
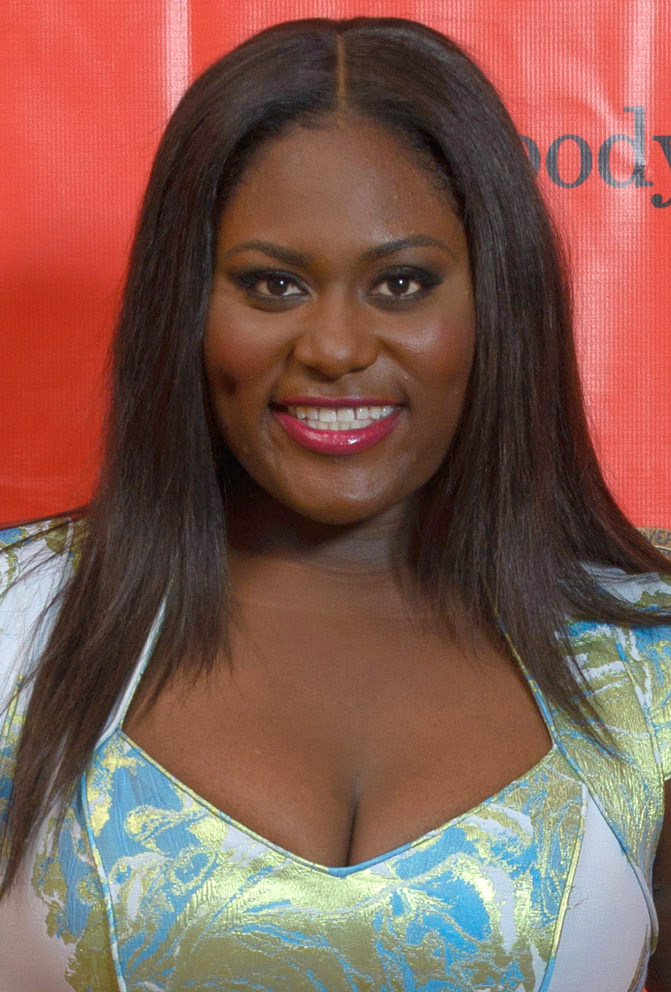
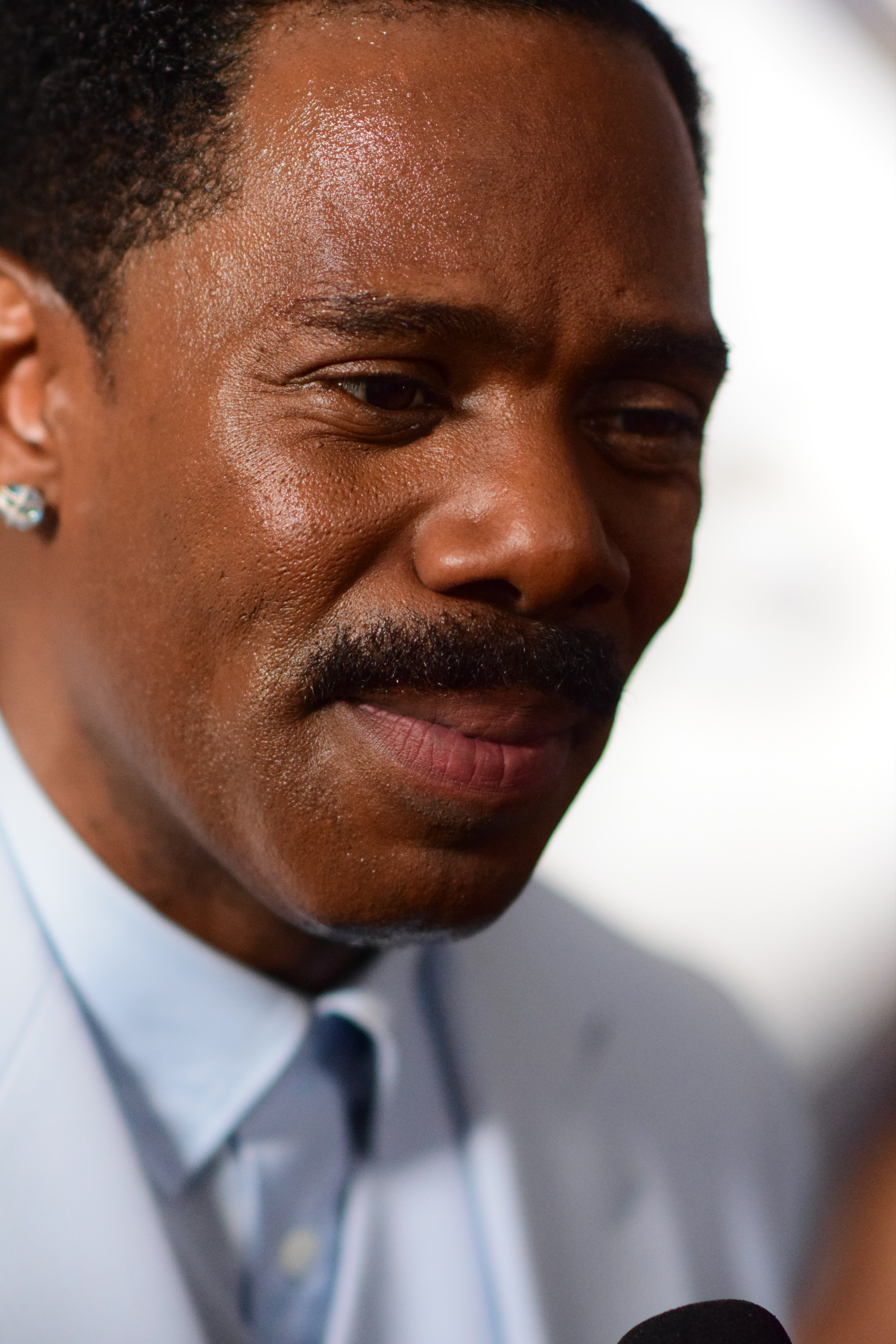
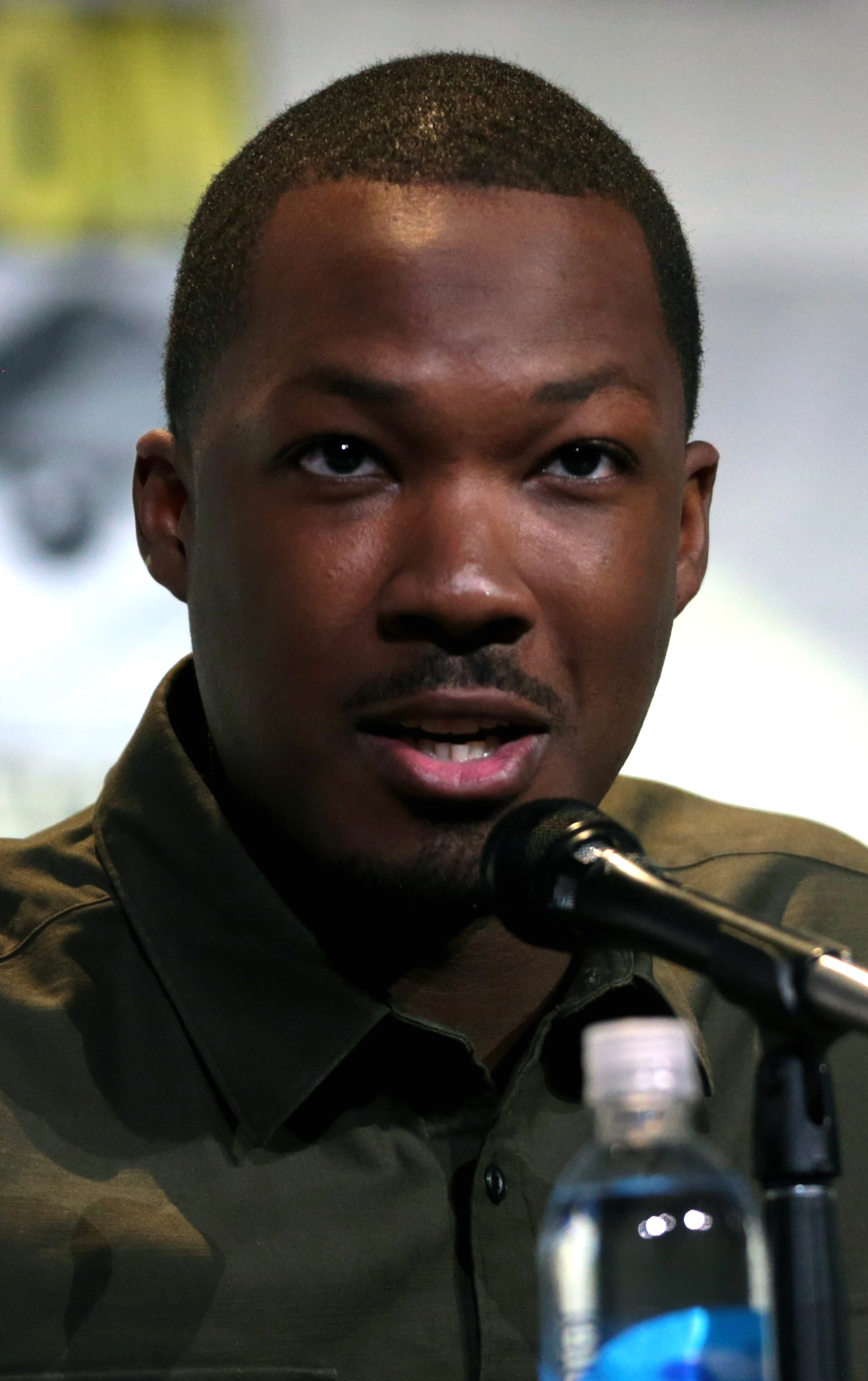
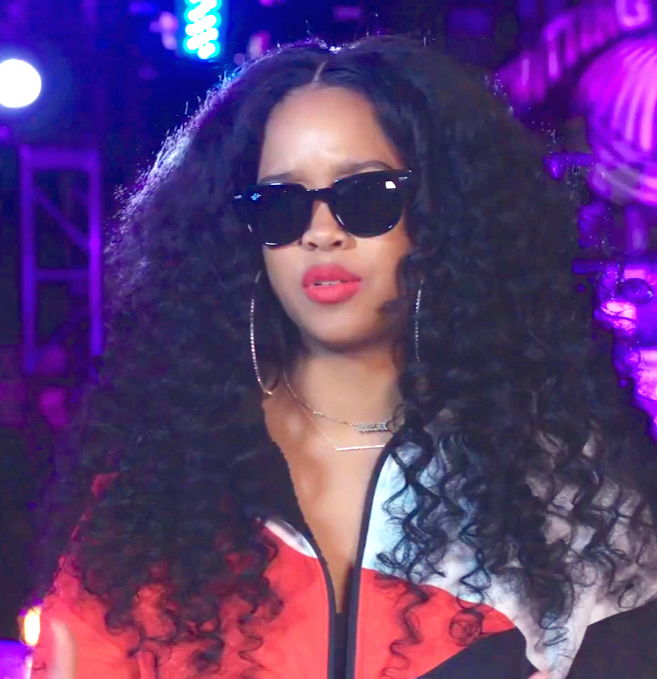
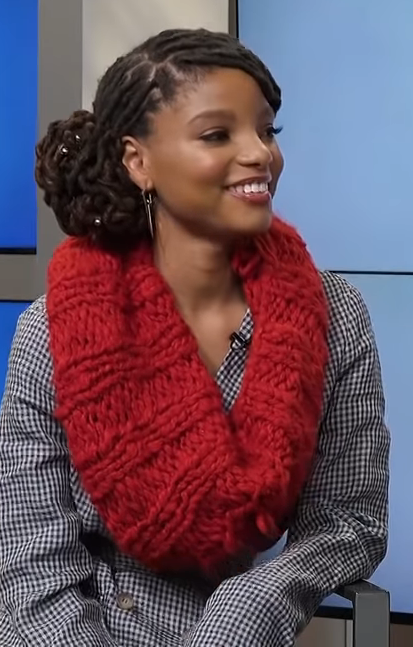
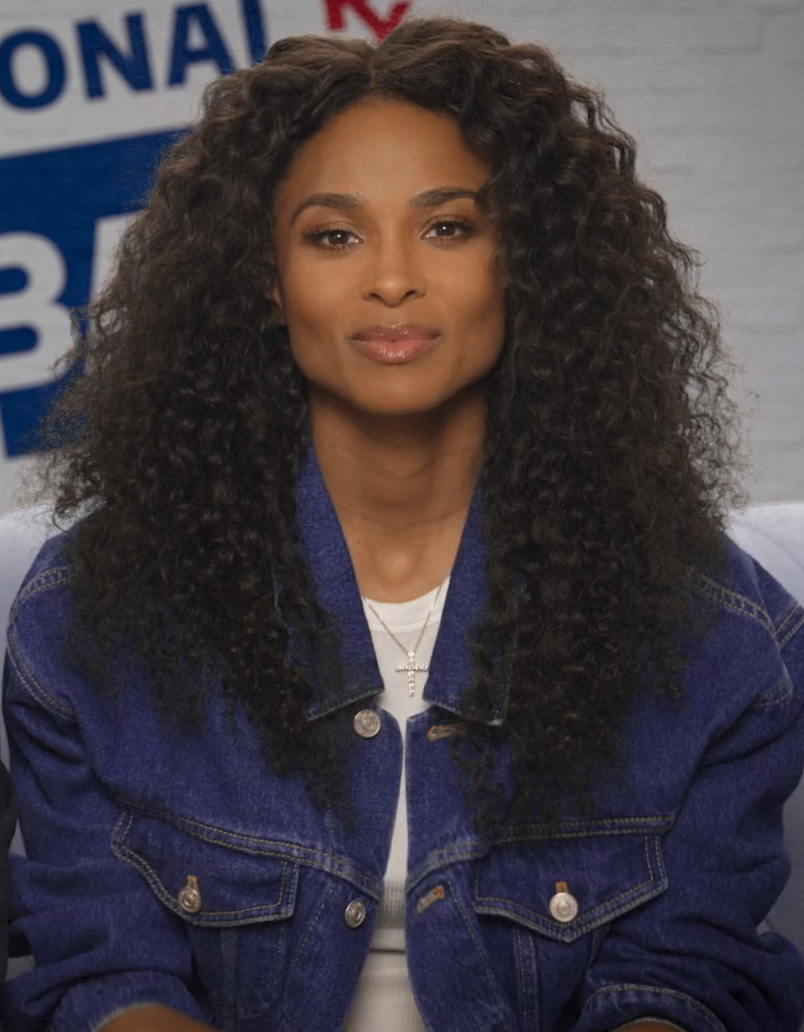
- Top row: (left to right) Fantasia Barrino, Taraji P. Henson, Danielle Brooks and Colman Domingo
- Bottom row: (left to right) Corey Hawkins, H.E.R., Halle Bailey and Ciara
- Fantasia Barrino as Celie Harris-Johnson
  - Phylicia Pearl Mpasi as young Celie
- Taraji P. Henson as Shug Avery
- Danielle Brooks as Sofia
- Colman Domingo as Albert "Mister" Johnson
- Corey Hawkins as Harpo Johnson
- H.E.R. (Note: Credited onscreen as Gabriella Wilson "H.E.R.") as Mary "Squeak" Agnes
- Halle Bailey as Nettie Harris
  - Ciara as older Nettie
- Louis Gossett Jr. as Ol' Mister Johnson
- Jon Batiste as Grady
- Aunjanue Ellis-Taylor as Mama
- David Alan Grier as Rev. Samuel Avery
- Deon Cole as Alfonso
- Tamela Mann as First Lady
- Elizabeth Marvel as Miss Millie
- Stephen Hill as Henry "Buster" Broadnax

Additionally, Whoopi Goldberg makes a cameo appearance as a midwife who helps young Celie give birth. Goldberg previously portrayed Celie in the original film.

== Production ==
=== Development ===
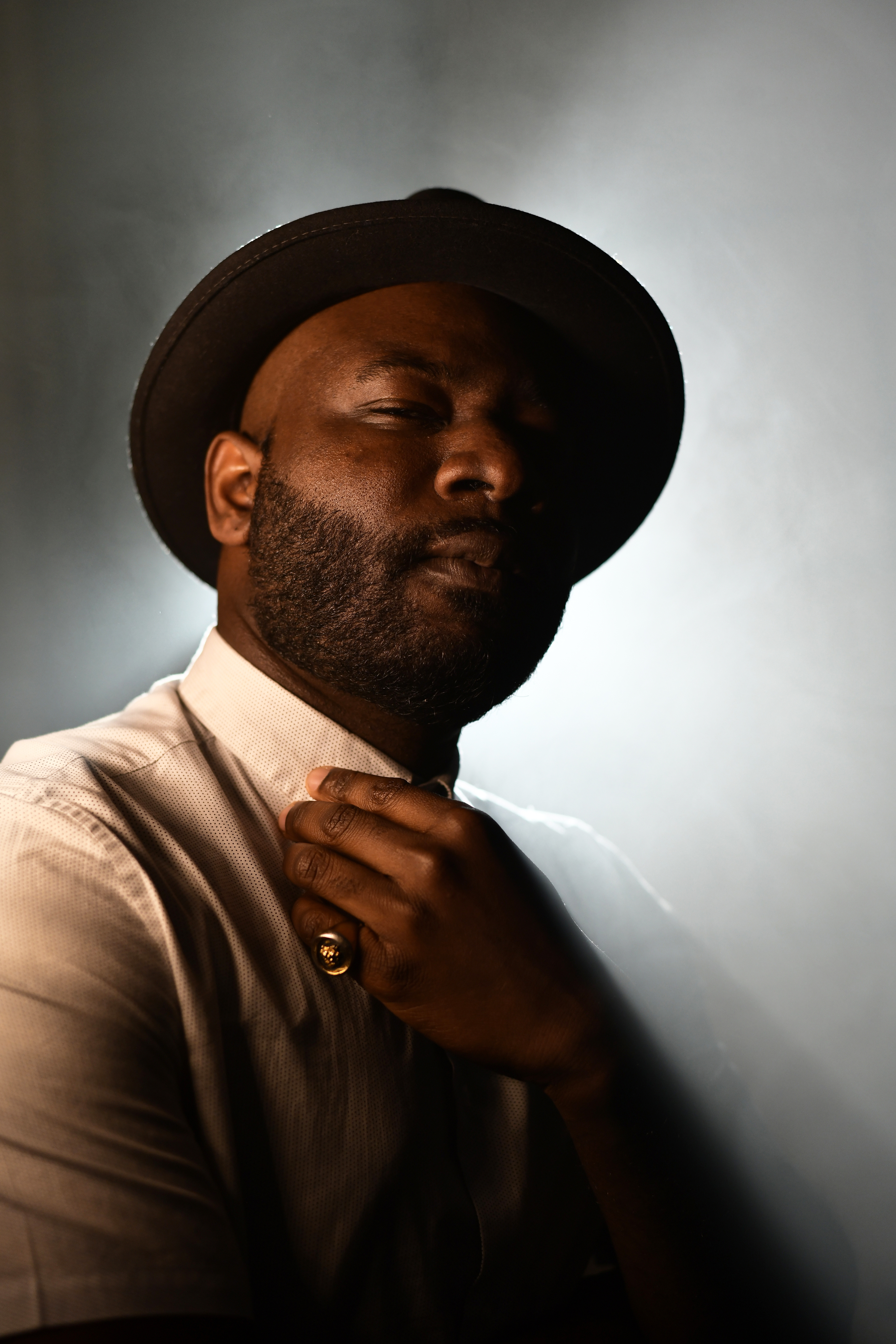
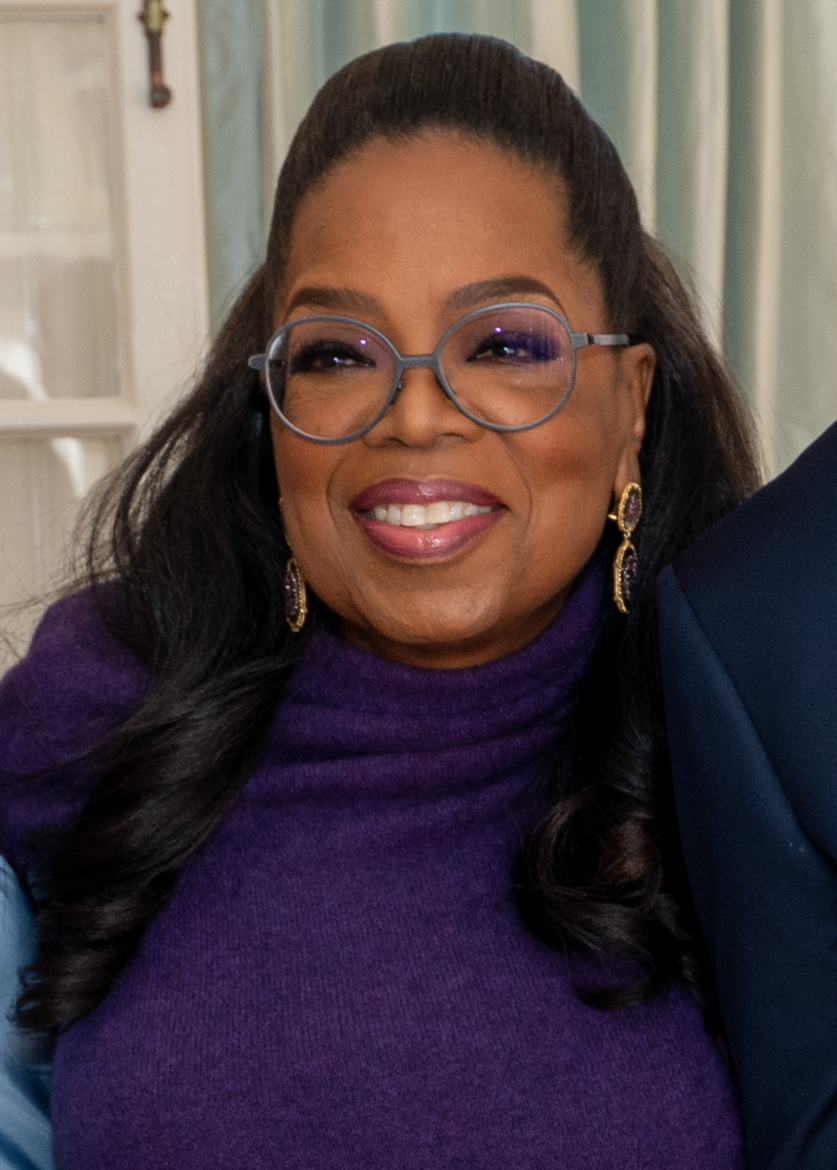
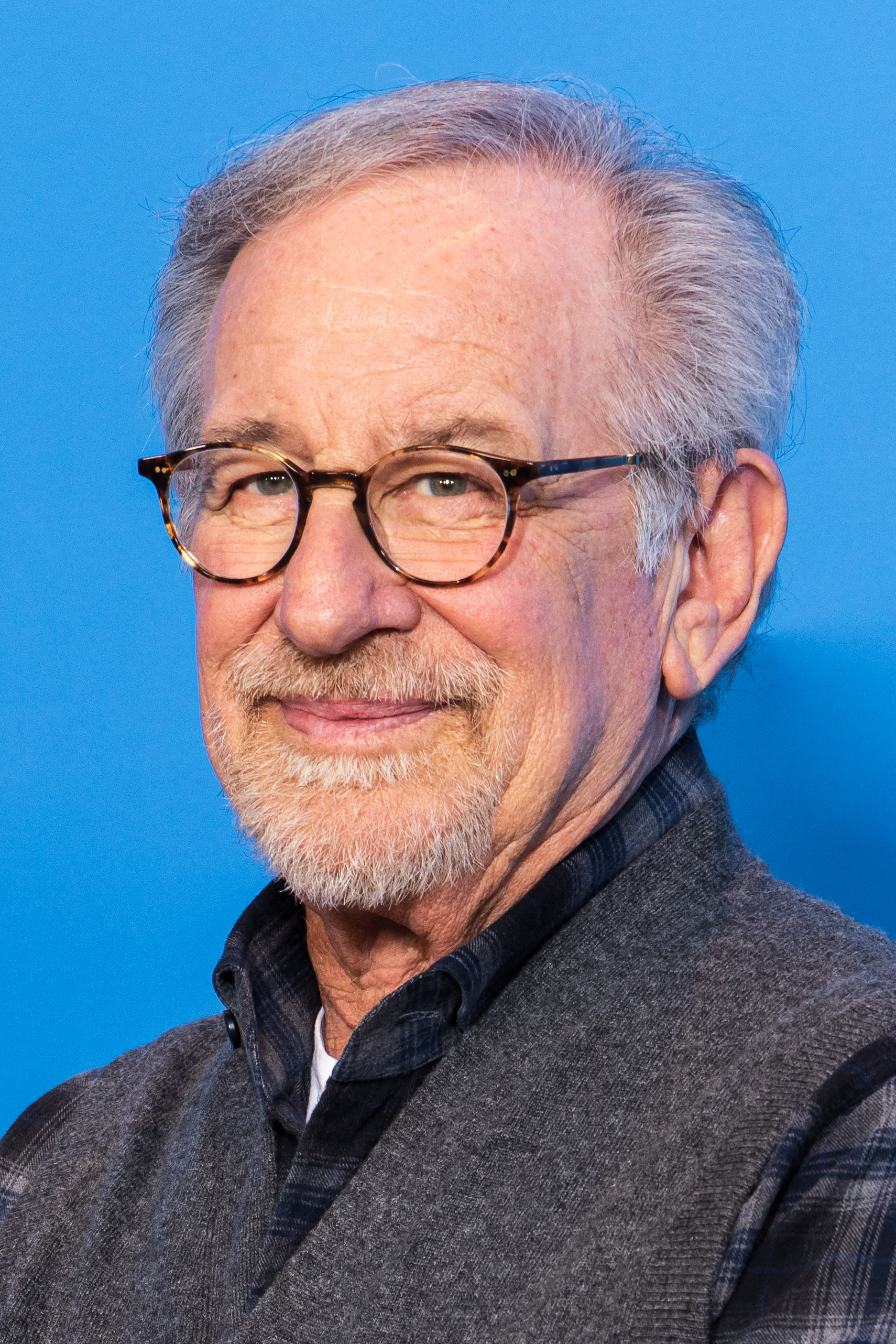
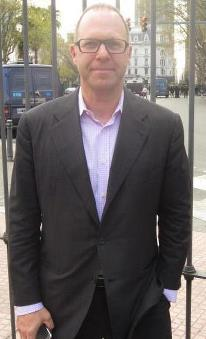
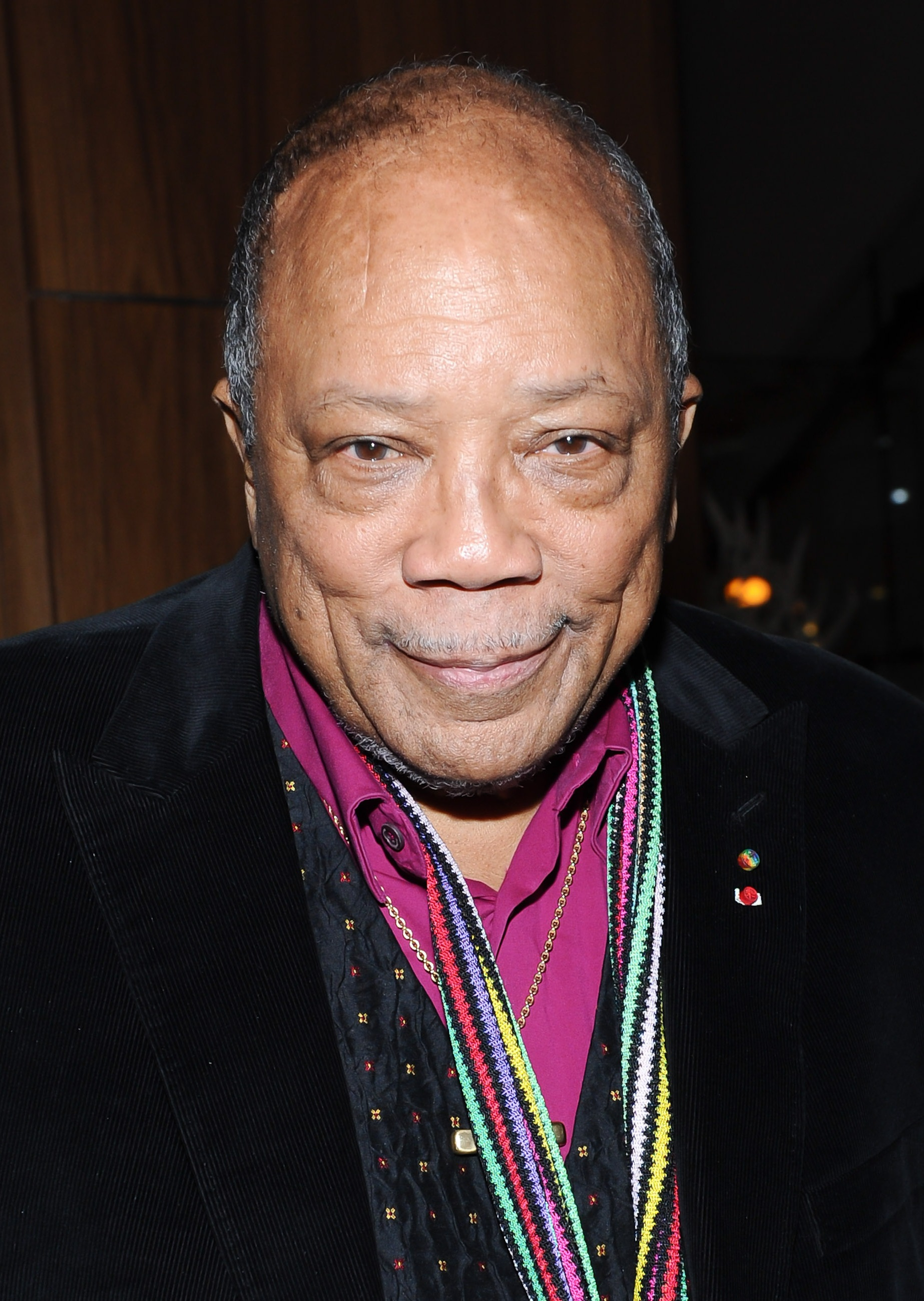
Director Blitz Bazawule (left), and producers Oprah Winfrey, Steven Spielberg, Scott Sanders and Quincy Jones.

In November 2018, it was reported that a film adaptation of the musical was in development at Warner Bros. Pictures and Amblin Entertainment, the same companies that made the 1985 film adaptation of the novel, with Steven Spielberg, Quincy Jones, Scott Sanders, and Oprah Winfrey all signed on to produce. In August 2020, it was announced that Marcus Gardley will pen the screenplay and Black Is King's Blitz Bazawule will direct. Winfrey praised the selection of Bazawule as director, after she and the producers saw his work on The Burial of Kojo, saying that they "were all blown away by Blitz's unique vision as a director and look forward to seeing how he brings the next evolution of this beloved story to life." It was also announced that Alice Walker, Rebecca Walker, Kristie Macosko Krieger, Carla Gardini, and Mara Jacobs will executive produce the film. Siedah Garrett joined Brenda Russell and Stephen Bray (in place of the late Allee Willis) in contributing new material to the film's score. The film had financing through Domain Entertainment.

=== Casting ===
In August 2021, Corey Hawkins was cast in a lead role. That same month, H.E.R. was cast in her feature acting debut. In February 2022, Taraji P. Henson, Fantasia Barrino, Danielle Brooks, Colman Domingo, and Halle Bailey joined the cast, with Barrino and Brooks reprising their roles from productions of the stage musical. In March 2022, Louis Gossett Jr., David Alan Grier, Tamela J. Mann, Phylicia Mpasi, Deon Cole, Stephen Hill, and Ciara joined the cast. In April 2022, Aunjanue Ellis, Elizabeth Marvel and Jon Batiste joined the cast.

In an interview with The Hollywood Reporter, Oprah Winfrey reported that the film had difficulty getting the cast that Bazawule wanted, as there were other productions with African American artists in progress. However, Winfrey explained that "if you were making this film for $30 or $40 million, the interest in the cast would be very different", but some producers put pressure on the names of the cast when the film hit $90–100 million in production, asking to include Beyoncé or Rihanna in the cast.

=== Filming ===
Filming began in March 2022, with production taking place at Driftwood Beach on Jekyll Island from March 16 to March 25. Filming officially wrapped in July 2022.

=== Allegations of unfair working conditions ===
In a 2024 interview with The New York Times, Taraji P. Henson spoke out against unfair pay and working conditions while working on the film. Henson said the studio forced her to audition despite being the director's first choice. She said, "At this point I’m a Golden Globe-winner and Academy Award–nominated...So I went in there with a chip on my shoulder because I was like, ‘You will never second-guess me again". Henson also alleged the production forced the cast to drive in production cars to set. She disagreed with the decision, citing safety and liability concerns, and alleged that she asked, "'Can I get a driver or security to take me?' I’m not asking for the moon. They’re like, 'Well, if we do it for you, we got to do it for everybody.' Well, do it for everybody! It’s stuff like that, stuff I shouldn’t have to fight for." Fellow actor Danielle Brooks revealed the actors did not initially get their own dressing rooms when they showed up for rehearsals, nor was food provided to them at that time. The cast reached out to Oprah Winfrey, one of the film's producers who eventually resolved the issue.

Producer Oprah Winfrey said of the matter, "I’m not in charge of the budget," adding "whenever I heard there was an issue or there was a problem, there was a problem with a cars or the problem with their food, I would step in and do whatever I could to make it right. And I believe that [Taraji] would even vouch for that and say that is true.” In 2024, Henson told Today, that she hopes the film's negative press surrounding the working conditions doesn't distract from the film. She said, "I hope they can focus back onto this film, because right now, to me, it feels like what I said is now becoming louder than this beautiful film". She also defended Oprah saying, "What you’re not gonna do is pit two Black women together".

=== Differences between stage and screen versions ===
On December 1, 2023, BroadwayWorld revealed that the film will not be a direct copy-and-paste adaptation of the stage musical, with elements from the novel and the 1985 film also being featured, including "Miss Celie’s Blues (Sister)," the song sung by the character of Shug Avery in the 1985 film. 13 songs from the musical were cut from the film, including "Somebody Gonna Love You," "Our Prayer," "Big Dog," "Dear God - Sofia," "Brown Betty", "Uh-Oh," "African Homeland," "Celie's Curse," "Any Little Thing," "What About Love (Reprise)," "That Fine Mister," "A Tree Named Sofia," and "All We Got to Say," while a song cut from the stage production, titled "She Be Mine," was reinstated for this film.

== Music ==
=== Soundtrack ===
On November 27, the soundtrack's musicians and singers were revealed to be executive produced by Quincy Jones, Larry Jackson and Scott Sanders via Warner Bros. records, WaterTower Music and Gamma. The soundtrack features songs by Alicia Keys, Usher, Mary J. Blige, Megan Thee Stallion, Jennifer Hudson, Tamela Mann, Mörda, Brenden Praise, Keyshia Cole, Ludmilla, Jorja Smith, Coco Jones, Mary Mary, Missy Elliott and the film's actors Halle Bailey, H.E.R, Fantasia and Ciara. Compositions from the Broadway production will be included, such as "She Be Mine" and "Shug Avery Comin' to Town", along with new, original music for the film.

American record production and songwriting duo Nova Wav, composed by Denisia Andrews and Brittany Coney were involved in the project by the director Bazawule. The duo wrote and composed original song "Keep It Movin'", with Morten Ristorp and Halle Bailey, and it is performed by Bailey and Phylicia Pearl Mpasi. The song was published on November 11, 2023. On November 27, 2023, "Lifeline" was published as the second original song from the film, written and performed by Alicia Keys.

The soundtrack album was released on December 15, 2023, by WaterTower Music with the title The Color Purple (Music From and Inspired By). A second official soundtrack album showcasing the film's score, which was composed by Kris Bowers, was released alongside the film itself on December 25, 2023.

=== Musical numbers ===
- "Huckleberry Pie" - Nettie and young Celie
- "Mysterious Ways" - First Lady, Rev. Samuel Avery, Nettie and Ensemble
- "She Be Mine" - Young Celie and Ensemble
- "Keep It Movin'" - Nettie and young Celie
- "Workin" - Harpo and Ensemble
- "Hell No!" - Sofia and Ensemble
- "Shug Avery" - Celie, Mister and Ensemble
- "Dear God – Shug" - Celie
- "Push Da Button" - Shug
- "What About Love?" - Celie and Shug
- "Agoo" - Ensemble
- "Hell No! (Reprise)" - Celie
- "Miss Celie's Blues (Sister)" - Shug
- "Miss Celie's Pants" - Celie, Sofia, Shug, Squeak and Ensemble
- "I'm Here" - Celie
- "Maybe God Is Tryin' To Tell You Somethin" - Shug and Rev. Samuel Avery
- "The Color Purple" - Celie, Sofia, Shug, older Nettie, Harpo, Mister and Ensemble

== Release ==
The film had its world premiere in London on November 20, 2023, and was released theatrically on December 25, 2023. It was originally scheduled to be released on December 20, 2023, but later switched release dates with Aquaman and the Lost Kingdom.

=== Home media ===
The Color Purple was released for digital platforms on January 16, 2024, and followed a Blu-ray, DVD, and 4K UHD release on March 12, 2024. The film was available to stream on Max beginning February 16, 2024.

== Reception ==
=== Box office ===
The Color Purple grossed $60.6 million in the United States and Canada, and $6.9 million in other territories, for a worldwide gross of $67.5 million. Variety reported that the film lost the studio $40 million, when factoring together all expenses and revenues.

In the United States and Canada, The Color Purple was released alongside Ferrari and The Boys in the Boat, and was projected to gross $8–10 million from 3,203 theaters on its first day. It exceeded expectations and grossed $18.2 million, finishing third at the box office for the day. Its opening day was the second-highest domestic opening for a film on Christmas Day of all-time (behind Sherlock Holmes' $24.6 million in 2009), and the highest-grossing domestic opening day for a musical post-COVID 19 pandemic. The following weekend the film made $11.7 million, finishing fourth at the box office and totaling $44 million over its first week of release. In its second weekend, the film made $4.8 million, finishing seventh.

=== Critical response ===
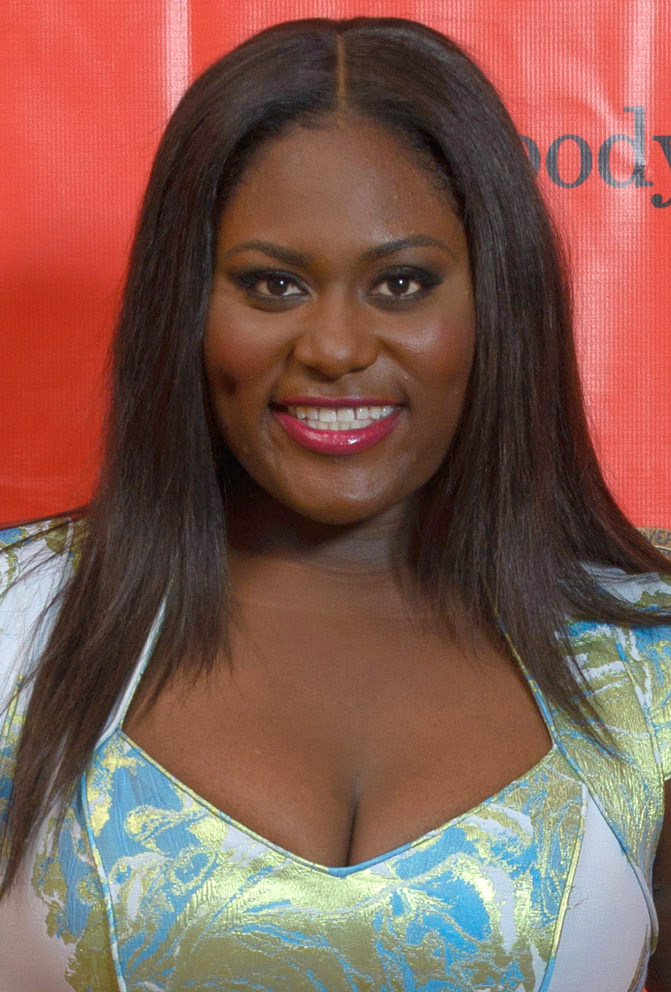
Danielle Brooks garnered critical acclaim for her performance and earned an Academy Award nomination for Best Supporting Actress.

On the review aggregator website Rotten Tomatoes, 81% of 256 critics' reviews are positive, with an average rating of 7.2/10. The website's consensus reads: "Building on the legacy of the previous film adaptation while incorporating elements of the stage musical, The Color Purple is a crowd-pleasing testament to resilience in the face of trauma." Metacritic, which uses a weighted average, assigned the film a score of 72 out of 100, based on 49 critics, indicating "generally favorable" reviews. Audiences polled by CinemaScore gave the film an average grade of "A" on an A+ to F scale, while PostTrak reported 92% of filmgoers gave it a positive score. Multiple publications listed it as one of the best films of 2023, including the New York Post, Deadline Hollywood, and People.

Pete Hammond, reviewing the film for Deadline Hollywood, reports that although "Spielberg’s version still resonates", the direction of Bazawule "brings a unique vision that makes this version stand on its own as an authentic and valuable addition to The Color Purple legacy", appreciating the photography of Dan Laustsen, which "gives a vision of the early 20th century South rarely seen in films depicting the period, particularly Black lives". Katie Walsh of Los Angeles Times described the director's approach as "modern, while paying homage to the traditions of Broadway musicals", while the cast "takes your breath away", praising Barrino for her "stunning performance as Celie, holding the emotional center over decades" and Brooks, who "steals the whole movie, [...] She brings fire, humor and grit to a character who undergoes a dramatic, tragic arc".

Peter Bradshaw of The Guardian wrote that although "the plot strands are to finally tie up with startling serendipity", with "warmth and vehemence in this movie, especially in the big ensemble numbers", the film "is less successful in the solo scenes and the evocation of loneliness and suppressed despair", appreciating "an absolute powerhouse trio of female leads here, supercharging the action with their fierce charisma" by Barrino, Henson and Brooks' performances. Peter Debruge of Variety pointed out that the film made "a satisfying improvement" from the original film adaptation, adding "expressionistic flourishes". Even if "some of these tricks work better than others", the journalist wrote that "all work to expand the experience, making The Color Purple feel even more monumental than it did in Spielberg’s hands".

Former U.S. President Barack Obama cited The Color Purple as one of his favorite films of 2023.

In February 2025, The Washington Post ranked the film at number 17 on its list of "The 25 best movie musicals of the 21st century," with Naveen Kumar writing "The immense heart of Walker’s story takes on fresh dimension in song while the camera lends it cinematic sweep — just what movie musicals do best."

=== Accolades ===
With her nomination for Best Supporting Actress, Danielle Brooks became the second actor nominated for playing the role of Sofia, after Oprah Winfrey's Oscar-nominated performance from the 1985 film.

The Color Purple led the nominations at the 55th NAACP Image Awards with sixteen nominations, and ultimately won eleven, including Outstanding Motion Picture, Outstanding Lead Actress (Fantasia Barrino), Outstanding Supporting Actress (Taraji P. Henson), Outstanding Supporting Actor (Colman Domingo), and Outstanding Ensemble Cast in a Motion Picture. The film surpassed the ten-nomination record jointly held by Black Panther, The Best Man, and Jingle Jangle: A Christmas Journey to become the most awarded and nominated film in the history of the ceremony.

| Award | Date of ceremony | Category | Nominee(s) | Result | Ref. |
|---|---|---|---|---|---|
| AARP Movies for Grownups Awards | January 17, 2024 | Best Picture/Best Movie for Grownups | The Color Purple | Nominated | |
| AARP Movies for Grownups Awards | January 17, 2024 | Best Supporting Actor | Colman Domingo | Nominated | |
| AARP Movies for Grownups Awards | January 17, 2024 | Best Supporting Actress | Taraji P. Henson | Nominated | |
| AARP Movies for Grownups Awards | January 17, 2024 | Best Ensemble | The cast of The Color Purple | Won | |
| Academy Awards | March 10, 2024 | Best Supporting Actress | Danielle Brooks | Nominated | |
| African-American Film Critics Association Awards | January 15, 2024 | Top 10 Films of the Year | The Color Purple | 3rd place | |
| African-American Film Critics Association Awards | January 15, 2024 | Best Musical | The Color Purple | Won | |
| African-American Film Critics Association Awards | January 15, 2024 | Best Supporting Actress | Danielle Brooks | Won | |
| African-American Film Critics Association Awards | January 15, 2024 | Best Ensemble | The cast of The Color Purple | Won | |
| African-American Film Critics Association Awards | January 15, 2024 | Best Music | Kris Bowers | Won | |
| Alliance of Women Film Journalists | January 3, 2024 | Best Actress in a Supporting Role | Danielle Brooks | Nominated | |
| Artios Awards | March 7, 2024 | Outstanding Achievement in Casting – Big Budget Feature (Drama) | Bernard Telsey, Tiffany Little Canfield, and Destiny Lilly | Nominated | |
| Astra Film and Creative Awards | January 6, 2024 | Best Picture | The Color Purple | Nominated | |
| Astra Film and Creative Awards | January 6, 2024 | Best Actress | Fantasia Barrino | Nominated | |
| Astra Film and Creative Awards | January 6, 2024 | Best Supporting Actress | Danielle Brooks | Nominated | |
| Astra Film and Creative Awards | January 6, 2024 | Best Supporting Actor | Colman Domingo | Nominated | |
| Astra Film and Creative Awards | January 6, 2024 | Best Cast Ensemble | The cast of The Color Purple | Won | |
| Astra Film and Creative Awards | February 26, 2024 | Best Hair and Makeup | Carol Rasheed, Saisha Beecham, Lawrence Davis, and Tym Wallace | Nominated | |
| Astra Film and Creative Awards | February 26, 2024 | Best Costume Design | Francine Jamison-Tanchuck | Nominated | |
| Astra Film and Creative Awards | February 26, 2024 | Best Casting | Bernard Telsey, Destiny Lilly, and Tiffany Little Canfield | Nominated | |
| Austin Film Critics Association Awards | January 10, 2024 | Best Supporting Actress | Danielle Brooks | Nominated | |
| BAFTA Film Awards | February 18, 2024 | Best Actress in a Leading Role | Fantasia Barrino | Nominated | |
| BAFTA Film Awards | February 18, 2024 | Best Actress in a Supporting Role | Danielle Brooks | Nominated | |
| Black Reel Awards | January 16, 2024 | Outstanding Film | The Color Purple | Nominated | |
| Black Reel Awards | January 16, 2024 | Outstanding Director | Blitz Bazawule | Nominated | |
| Black Reel Awards | January 16, 2024 | Outstanding Lead Performance | Fantasia Barrino | Nominated | |
| Black Reel Awards | January 16, 2024 | Outstanding Supporting Performance | Danielle Brooks | Won | |
| Black Reel Awards | January 16, 2024 | Outstanding Supporting Performance | Colman Domingo | Nominated | |
| Black Reel Awards | January 16, 2024 | Outstanding Supporting Performance | Taraji P. Henson | Nominated | |
| Black Reel Awards | January 16, 2024 | Outstanding Ensemble | Tiffany Little Canfield, Destiny Lilly, and Bernard Telsey | Won | |
| Black Reel Awards | January 16, 2024 | Outstanding Emerging Director | Blitz Bazawule | Nominated | |
| Black Reel Awards | January 16, 2024 | Outstanding Breakthrough Performance | Fantasia Barrino | Won | |
| Black Reel Awards | January 16, 2024 | Outstanding Breakthrough Performance | Danielle Brooks | Nominated | |
| Black Reel Awards | January 16, 2024 | Outstanding Breakthrough Performance | Phylicia Pearl Mpasi | Nominated | |
| Black Reel Awards | January 16, 2024 | Outstanding First Screenplay | Marcus Gradley | Nominated | |
| Black Reel Awards | January 16, 2024 | Outstanding Editing | Jon Poll | Nominated | |
| Black Reel Awards | January 16, 2024 | Outstanding Production Design | Paul D. Austerberry | Won | |
| Black Reel Awards | January 16, 2024 | Outstanding Costume Design | Francine Jamison-Tanchuck | Won | |
| Black Reel Awards | January 16, 2024 | Outstanding Hairstyling and Makeup | Lawrence Davis and Carol Rasheed | Won | |
| Black Reel Awards | January 16, 2024 | Outstanding Score | Kris Bowers | Won | |
| Black Reel Awards | January 16, 2024 | Outstanding Song | "Keep It Movin'" (Note: (Halle Bailey, Phylicia Pearl Mpasi, Denisia Andrews, Brittany Coney and Morten Ristorp)) | Won | |
| Black Reel Awards | January 16, 2024 | Outstanding Soundtrack | The Color Purple | Won | |
| Black Film Critics Circle | December 20, 2023 | Top Ten Films | The Color Purple | 3rd Place | |
| Black Film Critics Circle | December 20, 2023 | Best Supporting Actress | Danielle Brooks | Won | |
| Celebration of Cinema and Television | December 4, 2023 | Ensemble Award – Film | The cast of The Color Purple | Won | |
| Critics' Choice Movie Awards | January 14, 2024 | Best Picture | The Color Purple | Nominated | |
| Critics' Choice Movie Awards | January 14, 2024 | Best Supporting Actress | Danielle Brooks | Nominated | |
| Critics' Choice Movie Awards | January 14, 2024 | Best Acting Ensemble | The cast of The Color Purple | Nominated | |
| Critics' Choice Movie Awards | January 14, 2024 | Best Hair and Makeup | The Color Purple | Nominated | |
| Critics' Choice Movie Awards | January 14, 2024 | Best Costume Design | Francine Jamison-Tanchuck | Nominated | |
| Dallas–Fort Worth Film Critics Association | December 18, 2023 | Best Supporting Actress | Danielle Brooks | 2nd place | |
| Denver Film Critics Society | January 12, 2024 | Best Supporting Performance by an Actor, Female | Danielle Brooks | Nominated | |
| Denver Film Critics Society | January 12, 2024 | Best Original Song | "Keep It Moving" | Nominated | |
| Georgia Film Critics Association Awards | January 5, 2024 | Best Supporting Actress | Danielle Brooks | Nominated | |
| Georgia Film Critics Association Awards | January 5, 2024 | Best Ensemble | The cast of The Color Purple | Nominated | |
| Georgia Film Critics Association Awards | January 5, 2024 | Oglethorpe Award for Excellence in Georgia Cinema | Blitz Bazawule and Marcus Gardley | Nominated | |
| GLAAD Media Awards | March 14, 2024 | Outstanding Film – Wide Release | The Color Purple | Nominated | |
| Gold Derby Film Awards | February, 2024 | Best Supporting Actress | Danielle Brooks | Nominated | |
| Golden Globe Awards | January 7, 2024 | Best Actress in a Motion Picture – Musical or Comedy | Fantasia Barrino | Nominated | |
| Golden Globe Awards | January 7, 2024 | Best Supporting Actress – Motion Picture | Danielle Brooks | Nominated | |
| Grammy Awards | February 2, 2025 | Best Compilation Soundtrack for Visual Media | The Color Purple – Various Artists | Nominated | |
| Grammy Awards | February 2, 2025 | Best Score Soundtrack Album for Visual Media | The Color Purple – Kris Bowers | Nominated | |
| Heartland Film | 2023 | Truly Moving Picture Award | The Color Purple | Won | |
| Hollywood Music in Media Awards | November 15, 2023 | Original Song — Feature Film | "Keep It Movin'" | Nominated | |
| Hollywood Music in Media Awards | November 15, 2023 | Song — Onscreen Performance (Film) | "Keep It Movin'" (Note: (Halle Bailey and Phylicia Pearl Mpasi)) | Nominated | |
| Houston Film Critics Society Awards | January 22, 2024 | Best Picture | The Color Purple | Nominated | |
| Houston Film Critics Society Awards | January 22, 2024 | Best Actress | Fantasia Barrino | Nominated | |
| Houston Film Critics Society Awards | January 22, 2024 | Best Supporting Actress | Danielle Brooks | Nominated | |
| Houston Film Critics Society Awards | January 22, 2024 | Best Original Song | "Keep It Movin'" | Nominated | |
| Las Vegas Film Critics Society | December 13, 2023 | Best Costumes | The Color Purple | Nominated | |
| Las Vegas Film Critics Society | December 13, 2023 | Best Ensemble | The Color Purple | Nominated | |
| Make-Up Artists and Hair Stylists Guild | February 18, 2024 | Best Period Hair Styling and/or Character Hair Styling | Andrea Mona Bowman, Lawrence Davis, and Tym Wallace | Nominated | |
| NAACP Image Awards | March 16, 2024 | Outstanding Motion Picture | The Color Purple | Won | |
| NAACP Image Awards | March 16, 2024 | Outstanding Actress in a Motion Picture | Fantasia Barrino | Won | |
| NAACP Image Awards | March 16, 2024 | Outstanding Supporting Actress in a Motion Picture | Danielle Brooks | Nominated | |
| NAACP Image Awards | March 16, 2024 | Outstanding Supporting Actress in a Motion Picture | Halle Bailey | Nominated | |
| NAACP Image Awards | March 16, 2024 | Outstanding Supporting Actress in a Motion Picture | Taraji P. Henson | Won | |
| NAACP Image Awards | March 16, 2024 | Outstanding Supporting Actor in a Motion Picture | Colman Domingo | Won | |
| NAACP Image Awards | March 16, 2024 | Outstanding Supporting Actor in a Motion Picture | Corey Hawkins | Nominated | |
| NAACP Image Awards | March 16, 2024 | Outstanding Breakthrough Performance in a Motion Picture | Phylicia Pearl Mpasi | Won | |
| NAACP Image Awards | March 16, 2024 | Outstanding Ensemble Cast in a Motion Picture | The cast of The Color Purple | Won | |
| NAACP Image Awards | March 16, 2024 | Outstanding Breakthrough Creative (Motion Picture) | Blitz Bazawule | Won | |
| NAACP Image Awards | March 16, 2024 | Outstanding Writing in a Motion Picture | Marcus Gardley | Nominated | |
| NAACP Image Awards | March 16, 2024 | Outstanding Original Score for TV/Film | Kris Bowers | Nominated | |
| NAACP Image Awards | March 16, 2024 | Outstanding Soundtrack/Compilation Album | The Color Purple (2023 Original Motion Picture Soundtrack) | Won | |
| NAACP Image Awards | March 16, 2024 | Outstanding Costume Design | Francine Jamison–Tanchuck | Won | |
| NAACP Image Awards | March 16, 2024 | Outstanding Make-up | Carol Rasheed, Saisha Beecham, Ngozi Olandu Young, Manny Davila, and Milene Melendez | Won | |
| NAACP Image Awards | March 16, 2024 | Outstanding Hairstyling | Lawrence Davis, Tym Wallace, Andrea Mona Bowen, Angela Renae Dyson, and Jorge Benitez Villalobos | Won | |
| North Texas Film Critics Association | December 18, 2023 | Best Newcomer | Halle Bailey | Nominated | |
| Palm Springs International Film Festival | January 4, 2024 | Spotlight Award - Actress | Danielle Brooks | Won | |
| People's Choice Awards | February 18, 2024 | The Drama Movie of the Year | The Color Purple | Nominated | |
| People's Choice Awards | February 18, 2024 | The Drama Movie Star of the Year | Fantasia Barrino | Nominated | |
| People's Choice Awards | February 18, 2024 | The Movie Performance of the Year | Danielle Brooks | Nominated | |
| Satellite Awards | February 17, 2024 | Best Actress in Motion Picture, Comedy or Musical | Fantasia Barrino | Nominated | |
| Satellite Awards | February 17, 2024 | Best Costume Design | Francine Jamison-Tanchuck | Nominated | |
| Screen Actors Guild Awards | February 24, 2024 | Outstanding Performance by a Cast in a Motion Picture | The cast of The Color Purple | Nominated | |
| Screen Actors Guild Awards | February 24, 2024 | Outstanding Performance by a Female Actor in a Supporting Role | Danielle Brooks | Nominated | |
| Seattle Film Critics Society Awards | January 8, 2024 | Best Actress in a Supporting Role | Danielle Brooks | Nominated | |
| The Queerties | February 28, 2023 | Next Big Thing | The Color Purple | Nominated | |
| Washington D.C. Area Film Critics Association Awards | December 10, 2023 | Best Supporting Actress | Danielle Brooks | Nominated | |
| Washington D.C. Area Film Critics Association Awards | December 10, 2023 | Best Original Score | Kris Bowers | Nominated | |
| Women Film Critics Circle Awards | December 18, 2023 | Best Movie About Women | The Color Purple | Nominated | |
| Women Film Critics Circle Awards | December 18, 2023 | Best Supporting Actress | Danielle Brooks | Nominated | |
| Women Film Critics Circle Awards | December 18, 2023 | Adrianne Shelly Award | The Color Purple | Won | |
| Women Film Critics Circle Awards | December 18, 2023 | Josephine Baker Award | The Color Purple | Runner-up | |
