= Hollywood Music in Media Award for Best Original Song in a Feature Film =

Annual award for music in films

Hollywood Music in Media for Best Original Song in a Feature Film
- Country: United States
- Presented by: Hollywood Music in Media Awards (HMMA)
- First award: 2014; 12 years ago
- Currently held by: Diane Warren "One Right Here" from Maserati: The Brothers (2026)
- Website: www.hmmawards.com

The Hollywood Music in Media Award for Best Original Song in a Feature Film is one of the awards given annually to people working in the motion picture industry by the Hollywood Music in Media Awards (HMMA). It is presented to the songwriters who have composed the best "original" song, written specifically for a film. The award was first given in 2014, during the fifth annual awards.

== Winners and nominees ==
=== 2010s ===
Year	Film	Song	Nominees
(2014); 5th
(2014); 5th	Begin Again	"Lost Stars"	Gregg Alexander & Danielle Brisebois
(2014); 5th	The Fault in Our Stars	"Not About Angels"	Birdy
(2014); 5th	Muppets Most Wanted	"I'll Get You What You Want (Cockatoo in Malibu)"	Bret McKenzie
(2014); 5th	Wish I Was Here	"So Now What"	James Mercer
(2014); 5th	Wish I Was Here	"Wish I Was Here"	Cat Power and Guy Berryman, Jonny Buckland, Will Champion & Chris Martin
(2015); 6th
(2015); 6th	Furious 7	"See You Again"	Andrew Cedar, Justin Franks, Charlie Puth & Cameron Thomaz
(2015); 6th	I’ll See You in My Dreams	"I'll See You in My Dreams"	Keegan DeWitt
(2015); 6th	Love & Mercy	"One Kind of Love"	Brian Wilson & Scott Bennett
(2015); 6th	No Escape	"Take Care of You"	Jim James
(2015); 6th	Spectre	"Writing's on the Wall"	Sam Smith & Jimmy Napes
(2016); 7th
(2016); 7th	La La Land	"City of Stars"	Justin Hurwitz, Benj Pasek & Justin Paul
(2016); 7th	A Boy Called Po	"Dancing with Your Shadow"	Burt Bacharach
(2016); 7th	Hidden Figures	"Runnin'"	Pharrell Williams
(2016); 7th	La La Land	"Audition (The Fools Who Dream)"	Justin Hurwitz, Benk Pasek & Justin Paul
(2016); 7th	Rules Don't Apply	"The Rules Don’t Apply"	Eddie Arkin and Lorraine Feather
(2016); 7th	Too Late	"Down with Mary"	John Hawkes
(2017); 8th
(2017); 8th	Marshall	"Stand Up for Something"	Diane Warren, Common
(2017); 8th	Battle of the Sexes	"If I Dare"	Nicholas Britell
(2017); 8th	Fifty Shades Darker	"I Don't Wanna Live Forever"	Jack Antonoff, Sam Dew & Taylor Swift
(2017); 8th	The Greatest Showman	"This is Me"	Benj Pasek & Justin Paul
(2017); 8th	Mudbound	"Mighty River"	Mary J. Blige, Raphael Saadiq & Taura Stinson
(2017); 8th	The Promise	"The Promise"	Chris Cornell
(2018); 9th
(2018); 9th	A Star Is Born	"Shallow"	Lady Gaga, Mark Ronson, Anthony Rossomando and Andrew Wyatt
(2018); 9th	Book Club	"Living in the Moment"	Walter Afanasieff, Jay Landers and Carole Bayer Sager
(2018); 9th	Boy Erased	"Revelation"	Jónsi, Leland & Troye Sivan
(2018); 9th	Dumplin'	"Girl in the Movies"	Dolly Parton and Linda Perry
(2018); 9th	The Equalizer 2	"Animal Sauvage"	Gertjan Mulder
(2018); 9th	Fifty Shades Freed	"For You"	Ali Payami, Ali Tamposi & Andrew Watt
(2018); 9th	The Hate U Give	"We Won't Move"	Arlissa
(2018); 9th	On the Basis of Sex	"Here Comes the Change"	Kesha, Drew Pearson, Stephen Wrabel
(2019); 10th
(2019); 10th	Harriet	"Stand Up"	Cynthia Erivo (writer/performer), Joshuah Brian Campbell (writer)
(2019); 10th	Aladdin	"Speechless"	Alan Menken, Benj Pasek and Justin Paul (music & lyrics); Naomi Scott (performer)
(2019); 10th	Breakthrough	"I'm Standing with You"	Diane Warren (music & lyrics); Chrissy Metz (performer)
(2019); 10th	Bombshell	"One Little Soldier"	Regina Spektor (lyrics/performer)
(2019); 10th	Hobbs & Shaw	"Getting Started"	Justin Amundrud, Andrew DeRoberts, Joel Rousseau, Zach Skelton & Kyle Williams (writers); Aloe Blacc, J.I.D (performers)
(2019); 10th	The Lion King	"Spirit"	Beyoncé (writer/performer); Labrinth, Ilya Salmanzadeh (writers)
(2019); 10th	Motherless Brooklyn	"Daily Battles"	Thom Yorke (writer/performer); Flea (writer)
(2019); 10th	Rocketman	"(I'm Gonna) Love Me Again"	Elton John (writer/performer); Bernie Taupin (writer); Taron Egerton (performer)

=== 2020s ===
Year	Film	Song	Nominees
(2020); 11th
(2020); 11th	The Life Ahead	"Seen (Io sì)"	Laura Pausini (writer/performer); Diane Warren, Niccolò Agliardi (writers)
(2020); 11th	The 40-Year-Old Version	"Poverty Porn"	Radha Blank (writer/performer), Khrysis (writer)
(2020); 11th	Eurovision Song Contest: The Story of Fire Saga	"Húsavík (Hometown)"	Savan Kotecha, Rickard Göransson, Fat Max Gsus (writers); Will Ferrell, Rachel McAdams, Molly Sandén (performers)
(2020); 11th	Judas and the Black Messiah	"Fight for You"	H.E.R. (writer/performer); Dernst Emile II, Tiara Thomas (writers)
(2020); 11th	One Night in Miami...	"Speak Now"	Leslie Odom Jr. (writer/performer); Sam Ashworth (writer)
(2020); 11th	Tenet	"The Plan"	Travis Scott (writer/performer); Ludwig Göransson, Ebony Naomi Oshunrinde (writers)
(2020); 11th	The Trial of the Chicago 7	"Hear My Voice"	Celeste (writer/performer); Daniel Pemberton (writer)
(2020); 11th	The United States vs. Billie Holiday	"Tigress & Tweed"	Andra Day (writer/performer); Raphael Saadiq (writer)
(2021); 12th
(2021); 12th	No Time to Die	"No Time to Die"	Billie Eilish (writer/performer); Finneas O'Connell (writer)
(2021); 12th	Cyrano	"Every Letter"	Matt Berninger, Carin Besser, Aaron Dessner and Bryce Dessner (writers); Haley Bennett, Peter Dinklage and Kelvin Harrison Jr. (performers)
(2021); 12th	Don't Look Up	"Just Look Up"	Kid Cudi and Ariana Grande (writers/performers); Nicholas Britell and Taura Stinson (writers)
(2021); 12th	Flag Day	"My Father's Daughter"	Glen Hansard & Eddie Vedder (writers); Olivia Vedder (performer)
(2021); 12th	The Harder They Fall	"Guns Go Bang"	Kid Cudi & Jay-Z (writers/performers); Jeymes Samuel (writer)
(2021); 12th	In the Heights	"Home All Summer"	Lin-Manuel Miranda (writer); Leslie Grace, Anthony Ramos and Marc Anthony (performers)
(2021); 12th	King Richard	"Be Alive"	Beyoncé (writer/performer); DIXSON (writer)
(2021); 12th	Respect	"Here I Am (Singing My Way Home)"	Jennifer Hudson (writer/performer); Jamie Hartman & Carole King (writers)
(2022); 13th
(2022); 13th	Black Panther: Wakanda Forever	"Lift Me Up"	Rihanna (writer/performer); Tems, Ryan Coogler, Ludwig Görannsson (writers)
(2022); 13th	Amsterdam	"Time"	Giveon Evans (writer/performer); Aubrey Drake Graham, Daniel Pemberton and Jahaan Akil Sweet (writers)
(2022); 13th	Avatar: The Way of Water	"Song Chord"	Simon Franglen (writer); Zoe Saldana (performer)
(2022); 13th	Bones and All	"(You Made it Feel Like) Home"	Trent Reznor & Atticus Ross (writers/performers); Mariqueen Maandig Reznor (performer)
(2022); 13th	Bros	"Love Is Not Love"	Billy Eichner (writer/performer); Marc Shaiman (writer)
(2022); 13th	Spirted	"Do A Little Good"	Benj Pasek and Justin Paul (writers); Ryan Reynolds, Will Ferrell, Sunita Mani, Patrick Page and Tracy Morgan (performers)
(2022); 13th	Till	"Stand Up"	Jazmine Sullivan (writer/performer); D'Mile (writer)
(2022); 13th	Top Gun: Maverick	"Hold My Hand"	Lady Gaga (writer/performer); BloodPop (writer)
(2022); 13th	Where The Crawdads Sing	"Carolina"	Taylor Swift (writer/performer)
(2022); 13th	White Noise	"new body rhumba"	James Murphy, Nancy Whang, Patrick Mahoney (writers); LCD Soundsystem (performers)
(2023); 14th
(2023); 14th	Barbie	"What Was I Made For?"	Billie Eilish O'Connell (writer/performer); Finneas O'Connell (writers)
(2023); 14th	Barbie	"I'm Just Ken"	Ryan Gosling, Slash, Wolfgang Van Halen (performers), Mark Ronson and Andrew Wyatt (writers)
(2023); 14th	Flamin' Hot	"The Fire Inside"	Becky G (performer), Diane Warren (writer)
(2023); 14th	Flora and Son	"High Life"	Eve Hewson (writer/performer); Orén Kinlan, Jack Reynor, and Joseph Gordon-Levitt (performers), Gary Clark and John Carney (writers)
(2023); 14th	Origin	"I Am"	Stan Walker (writer/performer); Michael Fatkin, Vince Harder and Te Kanapu Anasta (writers)
(2023); 14th	Rustin	"Road to Freedom"	Lenny Kravitz (writer/performer)
(2023); 14th	The Beanie Bubble	"This"	OK Go (performer); Damian Kulash, Jr. and Timothy Nordwind (writers)
(2023); 14th	The Color Purple	"Keep It Movin'"	Halle Bailey (writer/performer); Phylicia Pearl Mpasi (performer); Denisia Andrews, Brittany Coney, and Morten Ristorp (writers)
(2024); 15th
(2024); 15th	The Six Triple Eight	"The Journey"	H.E.R. (performer); Diane Warren (writer)
(2024); 15th	Challengers	"Compress/Repress"	Mariqueen Maandig Reznor (performer), Trent Reznor, Atticus Ross and Luca Guadagnino (writers)
(2024); 15th	Emilia Pérez	"El Mal"	Zoe Saldaña (performer), Clément Ducol, Camille and Jacques Audiard (writers)
(2024); 15th	Better Man	"Forbidden Road"	Robbie Williams (writer/performer)
(2024); 15th	Emilia Pérez	"Mi Camino"	Selena Gomez and Édgar Ramírez (performers), Clément Ducol & Camille (writers)
(2024); 15th	Twisters	"Out of Oklahoma"	Lainey Wilson (writer/performer), Luke Dick and Shane McAnally (writers)
(2024); 15th	The Goat Life	"Periyone"	Jithin Raj (performer), A.R. Rahman and Rafiq Ahamed (writers)
(2024); 15th	The Idea of You	"The Idea of You"	Nicholas Galitzine & Anne-Marie (performers), Savan Kotecha, Albin Nedler & Carl Falk (writers)
(2024); 15th	Blitz	"Winter Coat"	Saoirse Ronan (performer), Nicholas Britell, Steve McQueen & Taura Stinson (writers)
(2025); 16th
(2025); 16th	Sinners	"I Lied To You"	Miles Caton (performer), Raphael Saadiq and Ludwig Göransson (writers)
(2025); 16th	Avatar: Fire and Ash	"Dream as One"	Miley Cyrus (writer/performer), Mark Ronson, Andrew Wyatt and Simon Franglen (writers)
(2025); 16th	F1	"Drive"	Ed Sheeran (writer/performer), Blake Slatkin and John Mayer (writers)
(2025); 16th	F1	"Lose My Mind"	Don Toliver and Doja Cat (writer/performers), Hans Zimmer, Ryan Tedder and Grant Boutin (writers)
(2025); 16th	Sinners	"Last Time (I Seen The Sun)"	Miles Caton and Alice Smith (writer/performers), Ludwig Göransson (writer)
(2025); 16th	Wicked: For Good	"No Place Like Home"	Cynthia Erivo (performer), Stephen Schwartz (writer)
(2025); 16th	Wicked: For Good	"The Girl in the Bubble"	Ariana Grande (performer), Stephen Schwartz (writer)
(2026); 17th
(2026); 17th	Maserati: The Brothers	"One Right Here"	Diane Warren (writer); Andrea Bocelli and Jennifer Hudson (performers)
(2026); 17th	The Hunger Games: Sunrise on the Reaping	"Draw You Out"	Noah Kahan and Aaron Dessner (writers); Noah Kahan (performer)
(2026); 17th	Wuthering Heights	"House"	Charlotte Aitchison, John Cale, Finn Keane and Nathan Klein (writers); Charli XCX and John Cale (performer)
(2026); 17th	Reminders of Him	"Light Over the Hill"	Noah Cyrus, Justin Franks and PJ Harding; Noah Cyrus (performer)
(2026); 17th	The Odyssey	"When I'm Home"	James Blake, Travis Scott. Ludwig Göransson and Christopher Nolan (writers); James Blake, Travis Scott and Ludwig Göransson (performers)
(2026); 17th	Behemoth!	"Your God Is Sleeping"	Lukas Frank (writer); Loren Kramar, Pascal Stevenson, Lukas Frank and Gregory Uhlmann (performers)
