= Miss Celie's Blues =

Song from The Color Purple (1985)

"Miss Celie's Blues", also known as "Sister", is a song from the Steven Spielberg film The Color Purple (1985), with music by Quincy Jones and Rod Temperton and lyrics by the two of them with Lionel Richie, performed by Táta Vega. The song was nominated for an Academy Award for Best Music, Original Song in 1986.

== Background ==
During the song, composed in a blues/ragtime style, the singer explains to her "sister" that she has her in her mind as a kindred spirit. She sings that after a long period of loneliness on the road, she has finally become "someone" and hopes that her sister is also.

In the 1985 film, the song is sung by Shug to Celie, and portrays the romantic and sexual relationship blossoming between the two women. Although Shug was portrayed by Margaret Avery, her voice was synchronised by Táta Vega, and the harmonica at the beginning of the song was played by Sonny Terry. It appeared in the 2023 film adaptation of the stage musical as a nod to the previous film, performed by Taraji P. Henson as Shug.

== Reception ==
"Miss Celie's Blues" was immediately popular with audiences, and Alice Walker, the author of the original novel took an instant liking to it. It became a concert piece independently of the song, and an unofficial anthem of the African-American lesbian community.

The song was covered by Ute Lemper (1987), Elba Ramalho (1989), Renato Russo (1994), Emiliana Torrini (1995), Nikka Costa (1996), Vanessa Petruo (2005), Marjorie Estiano (2005), Luiza Possi (2007) and Eden Atwood (2010). It has also been interpreted in a jazz style by such artists as Pat Thompson, Molly Johnson and Chaka Khan.
