= Keep It Movin' =

Promotional single by Halle and Phylicia Pearl Mpasi

from the album The Color Purple (Original Motion Picture Soundtrack)
- Released: November 11, 2023
- Genre: R&B
- Length: 3:52
- Label: Gamma
- Songwriters: Brittany Coney; Denisia Andrews; Halle Bailey; Morten Ristorp
- Producers: Nick Baxter; Stephen Bray; Nova Wav; Morten Ristorp; Blitz the Ambassador

"Keep It Movin'" was released on November 11, 2023 through Gamma Records as the first promotional single from the soundtrack album of the 2023 film The Color Purple. The song is performed by the film actresses Halle Bailey and Phylicia Pearl Mpasi as the younger versions of Nettie and Celie.

The song received positive receptions, winning the Black Reel Award for Outstanding Original Song and was shortlisted for Best Original Song at the 96th Academy Awards.

== Background and composition ==
After the announcing of The Color Purple, the second film adaptation of the 1982 novel of the same name by Alice Walker after Steven Spielberg's 1985 film, Kris Bowers was named as the composer of the score.

American record production and songwriting duo Nova Wav, composed by Denisia Andrews and Brittany Coney were involved in the project by the director Blitz the Ambassador. The duo wrote and composed original song "Keep It Movin", with Morten Ristorp and Halle Bailey. The song is performed by Bailey with Phylicia Pearl Mpas. In an interview with TheWrapAndrews explained the writing and production sessions of the song:

[Halle Bailey] had some sense of what her scenes were going to be and came in with some ideas. I’m happy that we didn’t see it beforehand, because I think it would have stifled our creativity. We would have been overthinking it. We went off emotions and what we thought it should feel like. Sonically it’s a little bit different in the instrumentation you use, for instance — we wouldn’t normally use harmonica in an everyday record. But it pushes up our creative boundaries.

— Denisia Andrews on "Keep It Movin'"

== Reception ==
The song received two nominations at the 14th Hollywood Music in Media Awards for Best Original Song — Feature Film and Best Song — Onscreen Performance (Film). It even won at the Black Reel Awards of 2024 for Outstanding Original Song.

In December 2023, the song was shortlisted for Best Original Song at the 96th Academy Awards.
