= 24th Annual Black Reel Awards =

Film-industry awards in 2024

24th Black Reel Awards
- Date: January 16, 2024 (Film); August 13, 2024 (Television)

Highlights
- Most wins: The Color Purple (9)
- Most nominations: The Color Purple (19)
- Outstanding Film: American Fiction

The 24th Annual Black Reel Awards ceremony, presented by the Foundation for the Augmentation of African-Americans in Film (FAAAF) and honoring the best films of 2023, took place on January 16, 2024; the combined film and television award ceremonies were presented together. The film nominations were announced on December 14, 2023. During the ceremony, the winners of the 7th Annual Black Reel Television Awards were announced; the television ceremony was initially scheduled for August 14, 2023, but was changed due to the 2023 Hollywood labor disputes, which took place from May 2 to November 9.

The film adaptation of the Broadway Tony Award-winning musical The Color Purple received the most nominations with nineteen, setting the mark for the most nominations for a musical film, followed by Rustin with ten. American actor Colman Domingo was honored with the inaugural Chadwick Boseman Vanguard Award, named after deceased actor Chadwick Boseman. American television producer Shonda Rhimes was honored with the Diahann Carroll Executive Award.

The nominations for the 8th Annual Black Reel Awards for Television were announced on June 13, 2024. National Geographic's biographical, anthology, drama series Genius: MLK/X received the most nominations with a tally of 14. Amazon Prime Video led the networks with 19 nominations across four shows. Donald Glover received four nominations, the most for any individual in this year. The winners were announced at a ceremony on August 13, 2024.

== Film winners and nominees ==
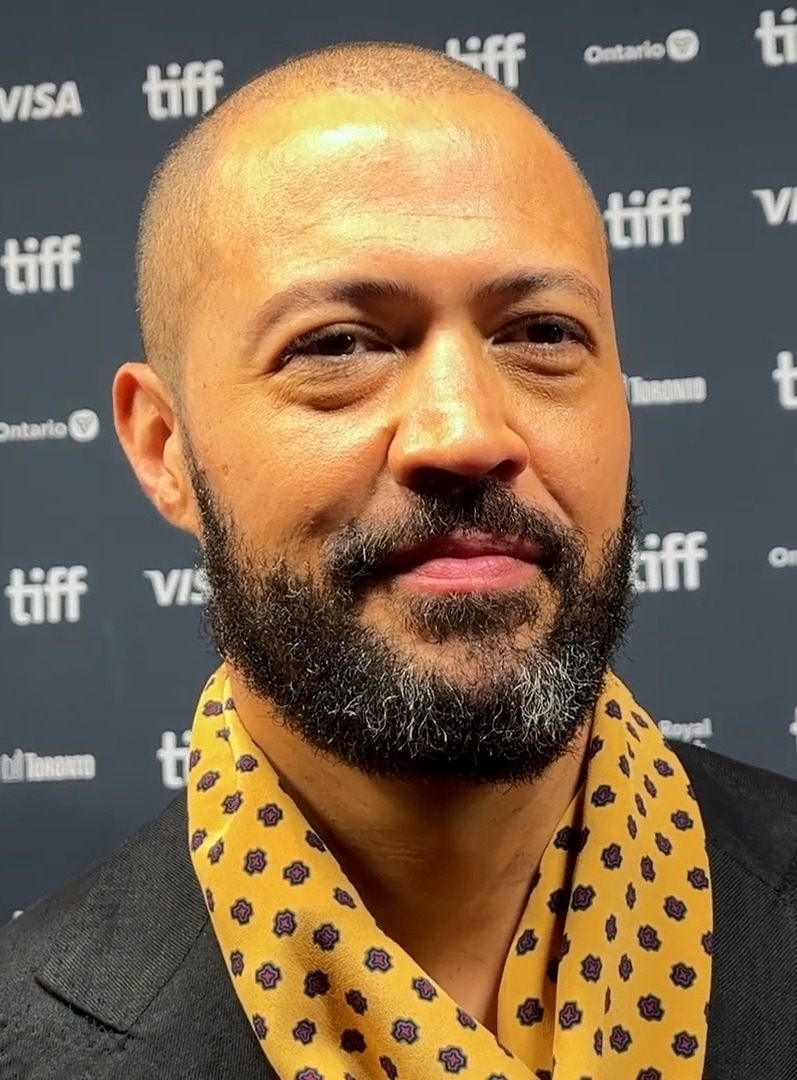
Cord Jefferson, Outstanding Film co-winner, Outstanding Director winner, and Outstanding Screenplay winner

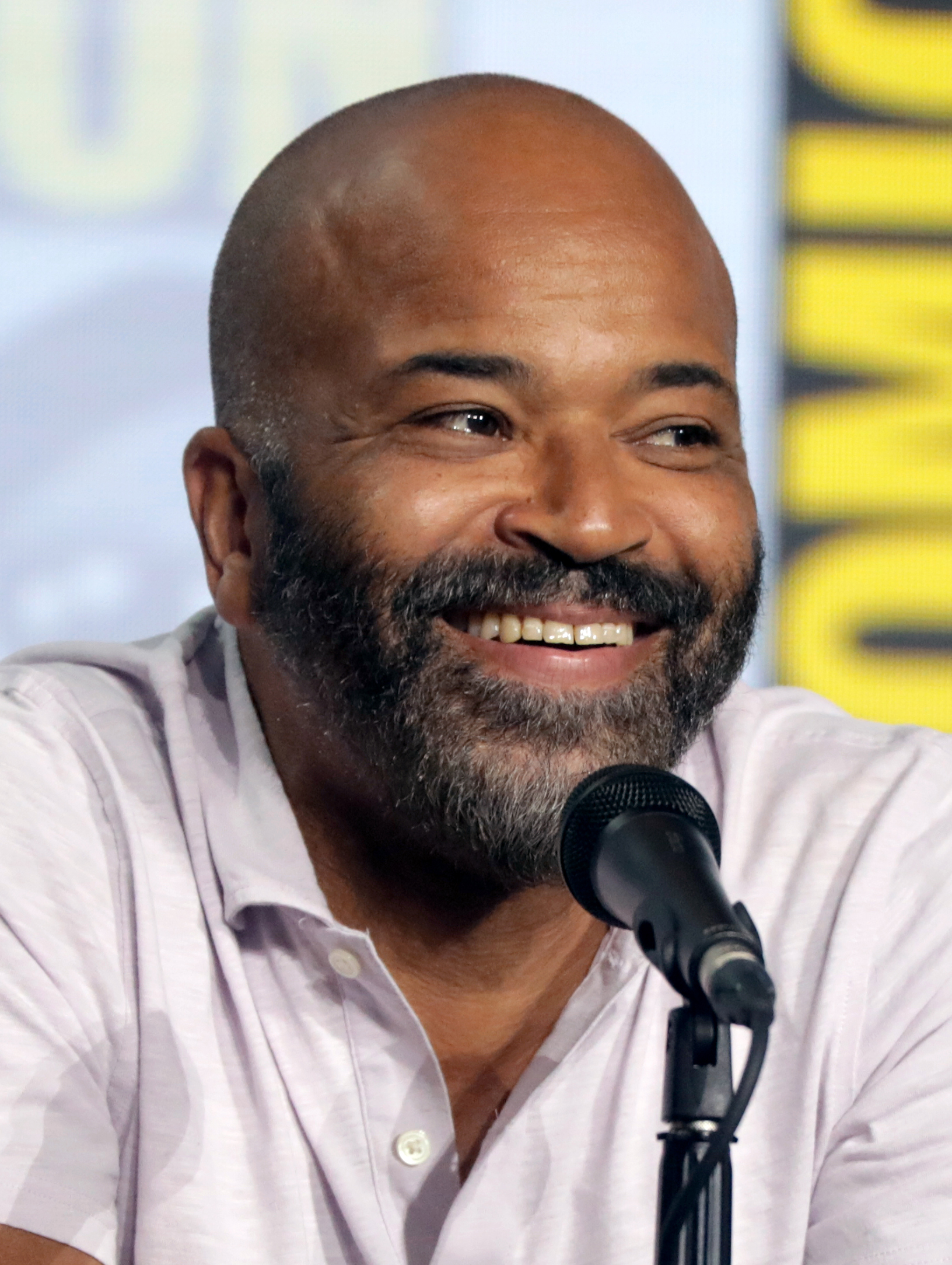
Jeffrey Wright, Outstanding Lead Performance winner

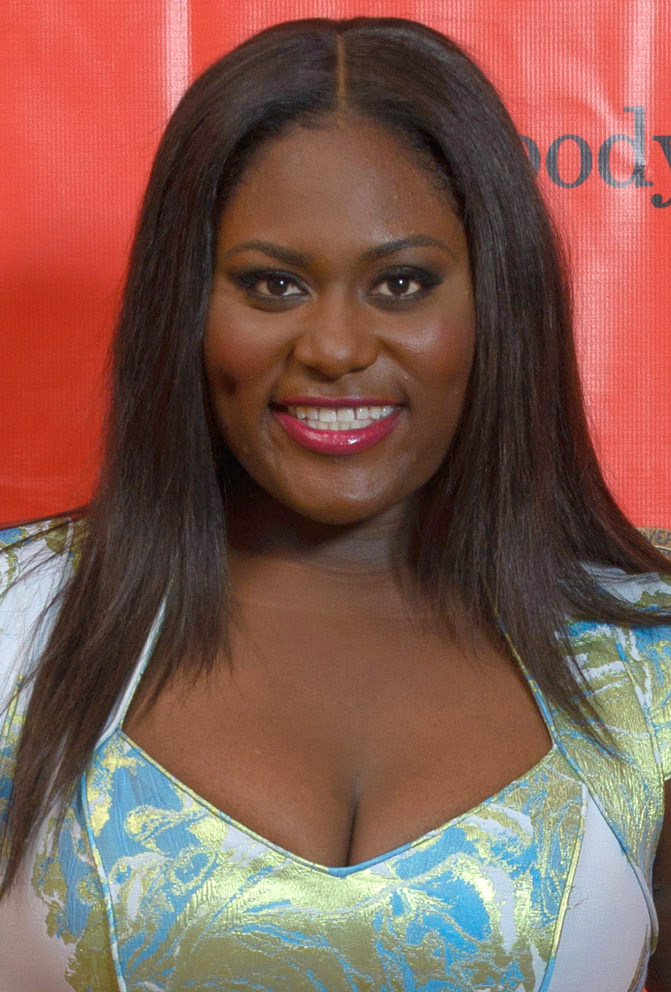
Danielle Brooks, Outstanding Supporting Performance winner

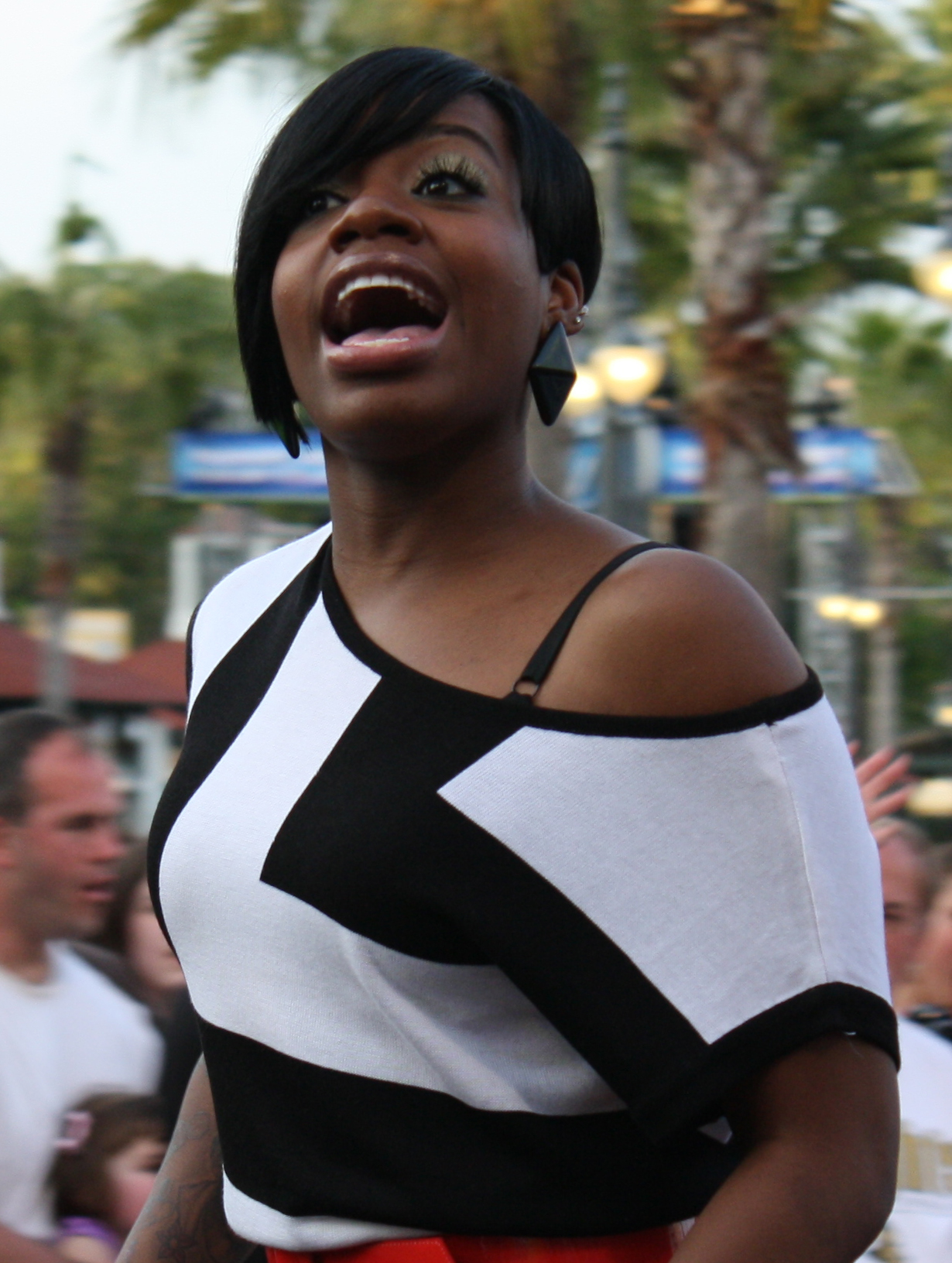
Fantasia Barrino, Outstanding Breakthrough Performance winner

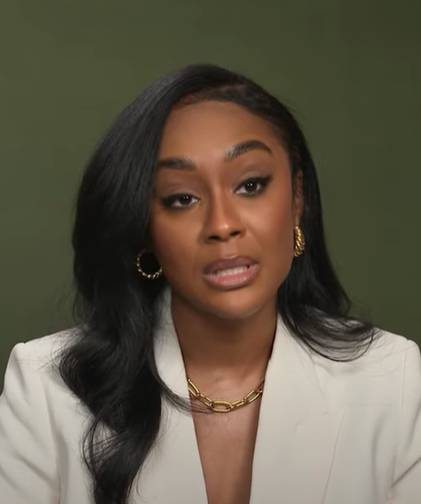
A. V. Rockwell, Outstanding Independent Film winner

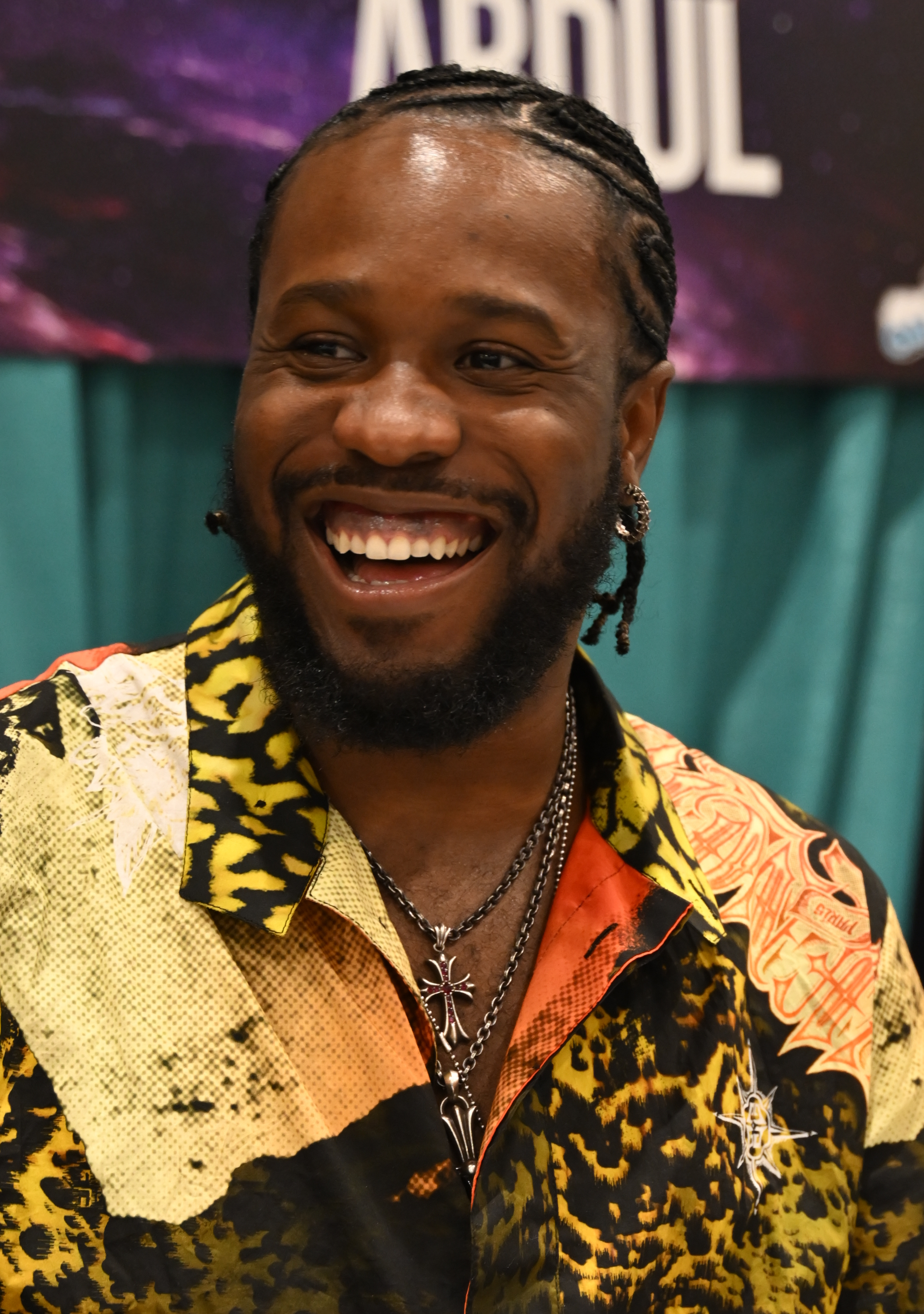
Shameik Moore, Outstanding Voice Performance winner

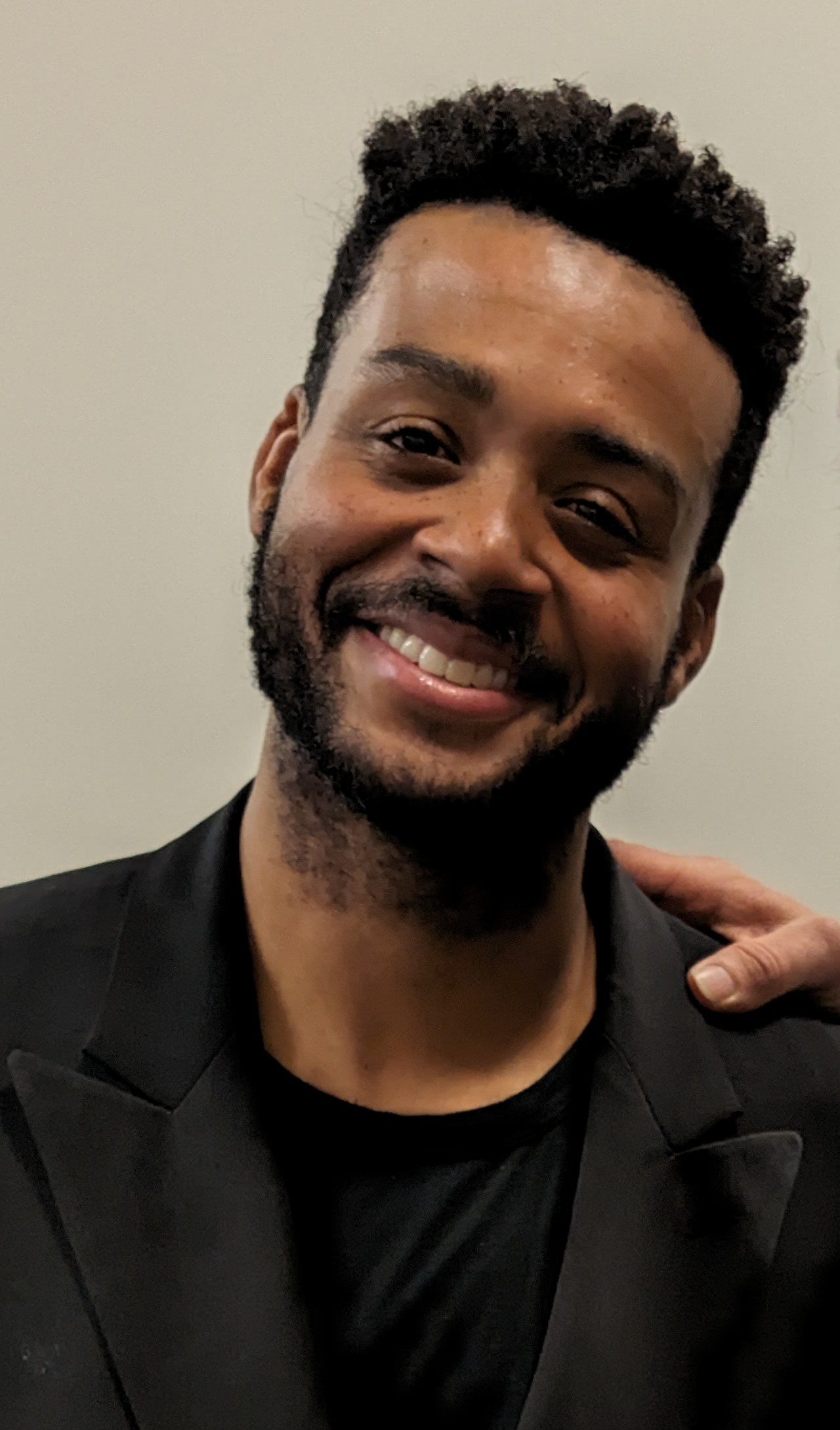
Kris Bowers, Outstanding Score winner

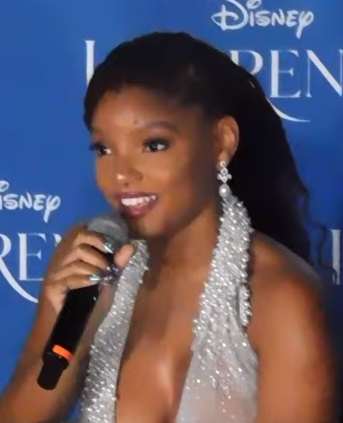
Halle Bailey, Outstanding Original Song co-winner

Outstanding Film	Outstanding Director
American Fiction – Ben LeClair, Nikos Karamigios, Cord Jefferson and Jermaine Johnson, producers; The Color Purple – Oprah Winfrey, Steven Spielberg, Scott Sanders and Quincy Jones, producers; Origin – Ava DuVernay and Paul Garnes, producers; Rustin – Bruce Cohen, Tonia Davis and George C. Wolfe, producers; Spider-Man: Across the Spider-Verse – Phil Lord, Christopher Miller, Amy Pascal and Avi Arad, producers	Cord Jefferson – American Fiction; Blitz Bazawule – The Color Purple; Ava DuVernay – Origin; Michael B. Jordan – Creed III; A. V. Rockwell – A Thousand and One
Outstanding Lead Performance	Outstanding Supporting Performance
Jeffrey Wright – American Fiction as Thelonious "Monk" Ellison; Fantasia Barrino – The Color Purple as Celie Harris-Johnson; John Boyega – They Cloned Tyrone as Fontaine / Tyrone; Colman Domingo – Rustin as Bayard Rustin; Aunjanue Ellis-Taylor – Origin as Isabel Wilkerson; Jamie Foxx – The Burial as Willie E. Gary; Kelvin Harrison Jr. – Chevalier as Joseph Bologne; Michael B. Jordan – Creed III as Adonis Creed; Teyana Taylor – A Thousand and One as Inez de la Paz; Sophie Wilde – Talk to Me as Mia	Danielle Brooks – The Color Purple as Sofia; Erika Alexander – American Fiction as Coraline; Sterling K. Brown – American Fiction as Clifford "Cliff" Ellison; Viola Davis – Air as Deloris Jordan; Colman Domingo – The Color Purple as Albert "Mister" Johnson; Jamie Foxx – They Cloned Tyrone as Slick Charles; Taraji P. Henson – The Color Purple as Shug Avery; Jonathan Majors – Creed III as Damian Anderson; Da'Vine Joy Randolph – The Holdovers as Mary Lamb; Jurnee Smollett – The Burial as Mame Downes
Outstanding Breakthrough Performance	Outstanding Ensemble
Fantasia Barrino – The Color Purple as Celie Harris-Johnson; Archie Madekwe – Gran Turismo as Jann Mardenborough; Halle Bailey – The Little Mermaid as Ariel; Danielle Brooks – The Color Purple as Sofia; Jerrod Carmichael – Poor Things as Harry Astley; Phylicia Pearl Mpasi – The Color Purple as young Celie; Tia Nomore – Earth Mama as Gia; Vivian Oparah – Rye Lane as Yas; Dewayne Perkins – The Blackening as Dewayne; Teyana Taylor – A Thousand and One as Inez de la Paz	The Color Purple – Tiffany Little Canfield, Destiny Lilly and Bernard Telsey, casting directors; American Fiction – Jennifer Euston, casting director; The Blackening – Leah Daniels Butler, casting director; Rustin – Cherelle Cargill and Avy Kaufman, casting directors; They Cloned Tyrone – Kim Coleman, casting director
Outstanding Short Film	Outstanding Documentary Feature
Black Girls Play: The Story of Hand Games – Joe Brewster and Michèle Stephenson, directors; ALIVE IN BRONZE: Huey P. Newton – A.K. Sandhu, director; Birthing a Nation: The Resistance of Mary Gaffney – Nazenet Habtezghi, director; The Dads – Luchina Fisher, director; The Last Repair Shop – Kris Bowers and Ben Proudfoot, directors	Little Richard: I Am Everything – Lisa Cortés, director; American Symphony – Matthew Heineman, director; Kokomo City – D. Smith, director; Renaissance: A Film by Beyoncé – Beyoncé Knowles-Carter, director; Stamped from the Beginning – Roger Ross Williams, director
Outstanding International Film	Outstanding Independent Film
Rye Lane (United Kingdom) – Raine Allen-Miller, director; Brother (Canada) – Clement Virgo, director; Our Father, the Devil (Cameroon) – Ellie Foumbi, director	A Thousand and One – A. V. Rockwell, director; All Dirt Roads Taste of Salt – Raven Jackson, director; Earth Mama – Savanah Leaf, director; How I Learned to Fly – Simon Steuri, director; Rye Lane – Raine Allen-Miller, director
Outstanding Screenplay	Outstanding First Screenplay
American Fiction – Cord Jefferson; Origin – Ava DuVernay; Rustin – Julian Breece and Dustin Lance Black; They Cloned Tyrone – Tony Rettenmaier and Juel Taylor; A Thousand and One – A. V. Rockwell	American Fiction – Cord Jefferson; All Dirt Roads Taste of Salt – Raven Jackson; The Color Purple – Marcus Gardley; Earth Mama – Savanah Leaf; A Thousand and One – A. V. Rockwell
Outstanding Emerging Director	Outstanding Voice Performance
Cord Jefferson – American Fiction; Blitz Bazawule – The Color Purple; Raven Jackson – All Dirt Roads Taste of Salt; A. V. Rockwell – A Thousand and One; Juel Taylor – They Cloned Tyrone	Shameik Moore – Spider-Man: Across the Spider-Verse as Miles Morales / Spider-Man; Ariana DeBose – Wish as Asha; Ayo Edebiri – Teenage Mutant Ninja Turtles: Mutant Mayhem as April O'Neil; Brian Tyree Henry – Spider-Man: Across the Spider-Verse as Jeff Morales; Daniel Kaluuya – Spider-Man: Across the Spider-Verse as Hobie Brown / Spider-Punk
Outstanding Score	Outstanding Soundtrack
The Color Purple – Kris Bowers; American Symphony – Jon Batiste; Chevalier – Kris Bowers; Rustin – Branford Marsalis; They Cloned Tyrone – Desmond Murray and Pierre Charles	The Color Purple; Creed III; The Little Mermaid; Rustin; Spider-Man: Across the Spider-Verse
Outstanding Original Song	Outstanding Cinematography
"Keep It Movin" from The Color Purple – Halle Bailey and Phylicia Pearl Mpasi, performers; Halle Bailey, Denisia Andrews, Brittany Coney and Morten Ristorp, writers; "Am I Dreaming" from Spider-Man: Across the Spider-Verse – Metro Boomin, ASAP Rocky and Roisee, performers; Leland Tyler Wayne, Roisee, Rakim Mayers, Mike Dean, Peter Lee Johnson and Landon "Script" Wayne, writers; "It Never Went Away" from American Symphony – Jon Batiste, writer and performer; "My House" from Renaissance: A Film by Beyoncé – Beyoncé, performer; Beyoncé Knowles-Carter and The-Dream, writers; "Road to Freedom" from Rustin – Lenny Kravitz, writer and performer	All Dirt Roads Taste of Salt – Jomo Fray; Earth Mama – Jody Lee Lipes; Kokomo City – D. Smith; Rye Lane – Olan Collardy; Silver Dollar Road – Henry Adebonojo and Antonio Rossi
Outstanding Editing	Outstanding Costume Design
Spider-Man: Across the Spider-Verse – Michael Andrews; The Color Purple – Jon Poll; Kokomo City – D. Smith; Origin – Spencer Averick; They Cloned Tyrone – Saira Haider	The Color Purple – Francine Jamison-Tanchuck; Air – Charlese Antoinette Jones; Renaissance: A Film by Beyoncé – Beyoncé and Shiona Turini; Rustin – Toni-Leslie James; They Cloned Tyrone – Francine Jamison-Tanchuck
Outstanding Production Design	Outstanding Hairstyling & Makeup
The Color Purple – Paul D. Austerberry; Chevalier – Karen Murphy; Renaissance: A Film by Beyoncé – Hannah Beachler; Rustin – Mark Ricker; Spider-Man: Across the Spider-Verse – Patrick O'Keefe	The Color Purple – Carol Rasheed, makeup department head and Lawrence Davis, hair department head; Air – Carla Farmer, hair department head; Bottoms – Shandrea Williams, hair department head; Rustin – Melissa Forney, hair department head and Beverly Jo Pryor, makeup department head; A Thousand and One – Craig Carter, hair department head

=== Honorary awards ===
- Diahann Carroll Icon Award – Shonda Rhimes
- Oscar Micheaux Memorial Award – Ruth E. Carter
- Ruby Dee Humanitarian Award – Sheryl Lee Ralph
- Sidney Poitier Trailblazer Award – Samuel L. Jackson
- Chadwick Boseman Vanguard Award – Colman Domingo

== Films with multiple nominations and awards ==
The following films received multiple nominations:

Nominations	Film
19	The Color Purple
10	Rustin
9	American Fiction
8	Spider-Man: Across the Spider-Verse
8	They Cloned Tyrone
8	A Thousand and One
5	Origin
4	All Dirt Roads Taste of Salt
4	Creed III
4	Earth Mama
4	Renaissance: A Film by Beyoncé
4	Rye Lane
3	Air
3	American Symphony
3	Chevalier
3	Kokomo City
2	The Blackening
2	The Burial
2	The Little Mermaid

The following films received multiple awards:

Wins	Film
9	The Color Purple
6	American Fiction
2	Spider-Man: Across the Spider-Verse

== Television winners and nominees ==
=== Comedy ===
Outstanding Comedy Series
Abbott Elementary – Quinta Brunson, showrunner (ABC); Diarra from Detroit – Diarra Kilpatrick, showrunner (BET+); The Ms. Pat Show – Jordan E. Cooper, showrunner (BET+); Rap Sh!t – Syreeta Singleton, showrunner (Max); Survival of the Thickest – Danielle Sanchez-Witzel, showrunner (Netflix)
Outstanding Lead Performance in a Comedy Series	Outstanding Supporting Performance in a Comedy Series
Ayo Edebiri – The Bear as Sydney Adamu (FX); Quinta Brunson – Abbott Elementary as Janine Teagues (ABC); Michelle Buteau – Survival of the Thickest as Mavis Beaumont (Netflix); Renée Elise Goldsberry – Girls5eva as Wickie (Netflix); Jharrel Jerome – I'm a Virgo as Cootie (Prime Video); Diarra Kilpatrick – Diarra from Detroit as Diarra Brickland (BET+); Anthony Mackie – Twisted Metal as John Doe (Peacock); Maya Rudolph – Loot as Molly Wells (Apple TV+); Jaz Sinclair – Gen V as Marie Moreau (Prime Video); Patricia "Ms. Pat" Williams – The Ms. Pat Show as Patricia "Pat" Ford Carson (BET+)	Janelle James – Abbott Elementary as Ava Coleman (ABC); Tone Bell – Survival of the Thickest as Khalil (Netflix); Lionel Boyce – The Bear as Marcus Brooks (FX); Giancarlo Esposito – The Gentlemen as Stanley Johnston (Netflix); Danielle Pinnock – Ghosts as Alberta Haynes (CBS); Sheryl Lee Ralph – Abbott Elementary as Barbara Howard (ABC); Tami Roman – The Ms. Pat Show as Denise Ford (BET+); J. B. Smoove – Curb Your Enthusiasm as Leon Black (HBO); Vince Swann – The Ms. Pat Show as Brandon James (BET+); Tyler James Williams – Abbott Elementary as Gregory Eddie (ABC)
Outstanding Guest Performance in a Comedy Series
Phylicia Rashad – Diarra from Detroit as Vonda (BET+); Erika Alexander – Run the World as Barb (Starz); Tatyana Ali – Abbott Elementary as Krystal (ABC); Garcelle Beauvais – Survival of the Thickest as Natasha Karina (Netflix); Jordan E. Cooper – The Ms. Pat Show (BET+); Keegan-Michael Key – Abbott Elementary as Superintendent John Reynolds (ABC); Sanaa Lathan – Curb Your Enthusiasm as Sibby Sanders (HBO); Da'Vine Joy Randolph – Only Murders in the Building as Detective Williams (Hulu); Cree Summer – Abbott Elementary as Rosalyn Inez (ABC); Robert Townsend – The Bear as Emmanuel Adamu (FX)
Outstanding Directing in a Comedy Series	Outstanding Writing in a Comedy Series
Abbott Elementary ("Party") – Directed by Randall Einhorn (ABC); Diarra from Detroit ("Chasing Ghosts") – Directed by Chioke Nassor (BET+); Loot ("Clueless") – Directed by Kevin Bray (Apple TV+); Gen V ("Guardians of Godolkin") – Directed by Sanaa Hamri (Prime Video); I'm a Virgo ("You a Big Muthaf*cka") – Directed by Boots Riley (Prime Video)	The Bear ("Honeydew") – Written by Stacy Osei-Kuffour (FX); Abbott Elementary ("Career Day, Part 1") – Written by Quinta Brunson (ABC); Survival of the Thickest ("Keep Your Plants Watered, Bitch") – Written by Michelle Buteau and Danielle Sanchez-Witzel (Netflix); Abbott Elementary ("Librarian") – Written by Morgan Murphy (ABC); I'm a Virgo ("You a Big Muthaf*cka") – Written by Boots Riley (Prime Video)

=== Drama ===
Outstanding Drama Series
Mr. & Mrs. Smith – Francesca Sloane, showrunner (Prime Video); Black Cake – Melissa Jo Cerar, showrunner (Hulu); The Equalizer – Andrew Marlowe and Terri Miller, showrunners (CBS); Lupin – George Kay, showrunner (Netflix); X-Men '97 – Beau DeMayo, showrunner (Disney+)
Outstanding Lead Performance in a Drama Series	Outstanding Supporting Performance in a Drama Series
Idris Elba – Hijack as Sam Nelson (Apple TV+); Rosario Dawson – Ahsoka as Ahsoka Tano (Disney+); Aunjanue Ellis-Taylor – Justified: City Primeval as Carolyn Wilder (FX); Giancarlo Esposito – Parish as Gracián "Gray" Parish (AMC); Donald Glover – Mr. & Mrs. Smith as John Smith / Michael (Prime Video); Quincy Isaiah – Winning Time: The Rise of the Lakers Dynasty as Magic Johnson (HBO); Sonequa Martin-Green – Star Trek: Discovery as Michael Burnham (Paramount+); Queen Latifah – The Equalizer as Robyn McCall (CBS); Zoe Saldaña – Lioness as Joe McNamara (Paramount+); Omar Sy – Lupin as Assane Diop (Netflix)	Nicole Beharie – The Morning Show as Christine Hunter (Apple TV+); Joey Badass – Power Book III: Raising Kanan as Kadeem "Unique" Mathis (Starz); Malcolm Barrett – Average Joe as Leon Montgomery (BET+); Colman Domingo – Fear the Walking Dead as Victor Strand (AMC); Gugu Mbatha-Raw – Loki as Ravonna Renslayer (Disney+); Audra McDonald – The Gilded Age as Dorothy Scott (HBO); Wunmi Mosaku – Loki as Hunter B-15 (Disney+); DeVaughn Nixon – Winning Time: The Rise of the Lakers Dynasty as Norm Nixon (HBO); Karen Pittman – The Morning Show as Mia Jordan (Apple TV+); Lynn Whitfield – The Chi as Alicia (Showtime)
Outstanding Guest Performance in a Drama Series
Michaela Coel – Mr. & Mrs. Smith as Bev (Prime Video); Michael Braugher – The Gilded Age as Booker T. Washington (HBO); Loretta Devine – Kingdom Business as Darlene West (BET+); Taye Diggs – All American as Billy Baker (CW); LisaGay Hamilton – Winning Time: The Rise of the Lakers Dynasty as Christine Johnson (HBO); Rashida Jones – Silo as Allison Becker (Apple TV+); Rob Morgan – Winning Time: The Rise of the Lakers Dynasty as Earvin Johnson Sr. (HBO); Wendell Pierce – Power Book III: Raising Kanan as Ishmael "Snaps" Henry (Starz); CCH Pounder – 3 Body Problem as Lillian Joseph (Netflix); Susan Kelechi Watson – Will Trent as Cricket Dawson (ABC)
Outstanding Directing in a Drama Series	Outstanding Writing in a Drama Series
Black Cake ("Eleanor") – Directed by Natalia Leite (Hulu); Mr. & Mrs. Smith ("A Breakup") – Directed by Donald Glover (Prime Video); Winning Time: The Rise of the Lakers Dynasty ("BEAT L.A.") – Directed by Salli Richardson-Whitfield (HBO); Average Joe ("Pilot") – Directed by Eric Dean Seaton (BET+); X-Men '97 ("Tolerance is Extinction, Part 1") – Directed by Chase Conley (Disney+)	X-Men '97 ("Remember It") – Written by Beau DeMayo (Disney+); Mr. & Mrs. Smith ("A Breakup") – Written by Francesca Sloane and Donald Glover (Prime Video); The Gilded Age ("Close Enough to Touch") – Written by Julian Fellowes and Sonja Warfield (HBO); Mr. & Mrs. Smith ("First Date") – Written by Francesca Sloane and Donald Glover (Prime Video); The Walking Dead: The Ones Who Live ("What We") – Written by Danai Gurira (AMC)

=== Television Movie or Limited Series ===
Outstanding Television Movie or Limited Series
Lawmen: Bass Reeves – Chad Feehan, showrunner (Paramount+); Genius: MLK/X – Raphael Jackson Jr. and Damione Macedon, showrunners (National Geographic); The Other Black Girl – Gus Hickey and Jordan Reddout, showrunners (Hulu); Them: The Scare – Little Marvin, showrunner (Prime Video); True Detective: Night Country – Issa López, showrunner (HBO)
Outstanding Lead Performance in a TV Movie/Limited Series	Outstanding Supporting Performance in a TV Movie/Limited Series
David Oyelowo – Lawmen: Bass Reeves as Bass Reeves (Paramount+); Uzo Aduba – Painkiller as Edie Flowers (Netflix); Deborah Ayorinde – Them: The Scare as Detective Dawn Reeve (Prime Video); Zazie Beetz – Black Mirror as Bo (Netflix); Kelvin Harrison Jr. – Genius: MLK/X as Martin Luther King Jr. (National Geographic); Carl Lumbly – The Fall of the House of Usher as C. Auguste Dupin (Netflix); Ashleigh Murray – The Other Black Girl as Hazel-May McCall (Hulu); Leslie Odom Jr. – Great Performances: Purlie Victorious as Purlie Victorious Judson (PBS); Aaron Pierre – Genius: MLK/X as Malcolm X (National Geographic); Courtney B. Vance – Heist 88 as Jeremy Horne (Showtime)	Luke James – Them: The Scare as Edmund Gaines (Prime Video); Jelani Alladin – Fellow Travelers as Marcus Gaines (Showtime); Don Cheadle – Secret Invasion as Raava / James "Rhodey" Rhodes (Disney+); Pam Grier – Them: The Scare as Athena Reeve (Prime Video); Jharrel Jerome – Full Circle as Aked (Max); Ron Cephas Jones – Genius: MLK/X as Elijah Muhammad (National Geographic); Aja Naomi King – Lessons in Chemistry as Harriet Sloane (Apple TV+); Lamorne Morris – Fargo as Whitley "Witt" Farr (FX); Kali Reis – True Detective as Evangeline Navarro (HBO); Noah J. Ricketts – Fellow Travelers (Showtime)
Outstanding Directing in a TV Movie or Limited Series	Outstanding Writing in a TV Movie or Limited Series
Genius: MLK/X ("Graduation") – Directed by Channing Godfrey Peoples (National Geographic); Them: The Scare ("One of Us is Gonna Die Tonight") – Directed by Little Marvin (Prime Video); Lessons in Chemistry ("CH3COOH") – Directed by Millicent Shelton (Apple TV+); A Man in Full ("Saddlebags") – Directed by Regina King (Netflix); The Other Black Girl ("To Be Young, Gifted and Broke") – Directed by Mariama Diallo (Hulu)	Genius: MLK/X ("Matriarchs") – Written by Sigrid Gilmer (National Geographic); Them: The Scare ("Are You Scared?") – Written by Little Marvin (Prime Video); Genius: MLK/X ("Graduation") – Written by Jeff Stetson (National Geographic); Lawmen: Bass Reeves ("Part V") – Written by Terence Anthony (Paramount+); Fellow Travelers ("White Nights") – Written by Brandon K. Hines and Ron Nyswaner (Showtime)

=== Other programs ===
Outstanding Documentary	Outstanding Variety, Sketch, or Talk – Series or Special
STAX: Soulsville U.S.A. – Directed by Jamila Wignot (Max); Black Twitter: A People's History – Directed by Prentice Penny (Hulu); The Greatest Night in Pop – Directed by Bob Nguyen (Netflix); Ladies First: A Story of Women in Hip-Hop – Directed by Giselle Bailey, Hannah Beachler, Dream Hampton and Resham Nijohon (Netflix); MoviePass, MovieCrash – Directed by Muta'Ali (Max)	The Apple Music Super Bowl LVIII Halftime Show starring Usher (CBS); A Grammy Salute to 50 Years of Hip-Hop (CBS); Great Performances: Purlie Victorious (PBS); The Jennifer Hudson Show (Syndicated); Trevor Noah: Where Was I (Netflix)

=== Music categories ===
Outstanding Musical Score	Outstanding Music Supervision
Genius: MLK/X – Composed by Terence Blanchard (National Geographic); Ladies First: A Story of Women in Hip-Hop – Composed by Rodney Chrome (Netflix); Lawmen: Bass Reeves – Composed by Chanda Dancy (Paramount+); Run the World – Composed by Robert Glasper (Starz); Winning Time: The Rise of the Lakers Dynasty – Composed by Robert Glasper and Jeff Beal (HBO)	Ladies First: A Story of Women in Hip-Hop – Tamar Davis, Ashley Davis, Lana Bui and Tim Bjorkman (Netflix); The Chi – Derryck "Big Tank" Thornton (Showtime); Genius: MLK/X – Amani K. Smith (National Geographic); Run the World – Morgan Rhodes (Starz); Swagger – Derryck "Big Tank" Thornton (Apple TV+)
Outstanding Original Song
"Change the World" from Genius: MLK/X – Written and performed by Aloe Blacc and Blu (National Geographic); "Back to Love" from Run the World – Written and performed by Robert Glasper, SiR and Alexandra Isley (Starz); "Grace Amazing" from Kingdom Business – Written by Kirk Franklin; Performed by Yolanda Adams (BET+); "We Family” from Kingdom Business – Written by Kirk Franklin; Performed by Yolanda Adams, Chaundre Broomfield and Kiandra Richardson (BET+); "Win" from Swagger – Written by Jason Mills; Performed by IDK (Apple TV+)

=== Technical categories ===
Outstanding Cinematography	Outstanding Costume Design
Black Cake – Richard J. Vialet (Hulu); The Chi – Nathan Ray Salter (Showtime); The Equalizer – Terrence Laron Burke (CBS); Genius: MLK/X – Joe 'Jody' Williams (National Geographic); Kings from Queens: The Run-DMC Story – Darius Lyles and Yves Wilson (Peacock)	Genius: MLK/X – Mercedes Cook (National Geographic); I'm a Virgo – Deidra Elizabeth Govan (Prime Video); Power Book III: Raising Kanan – Tsigie White Robinson (Starz); Run the World – Dyshaun Burton (Starz); The Apple Music Super Bowl LVIII Halftime Show starring Usher – Tanja Caldwell (CBS)
Outstanding Editing	Outstanding Makeup & Hairstyling
Genius: MLK/X – Libya El-Amin (National Geographic); Lawmen: Bass Reeves – Michael Schultz (Paramount+); Special Ops: Lioness – Sushila Love (Paramount+); Swagger – Angela Latimer (Apple TV+); Winning Time: The Rise of the Lakers Dynasty – Felicia Mignon Livingston (HBO)	Genius: MLK/X – Jeremy Dell and Jessi Dean (National Geographic); Abbott Elementary – Constance Foe and Moira Fraizer (ABC); I'm a Virgo – Yolanda Mercadel and LeDiedra Richard-Baldwin (Amazon Prime Video); Lawmen: Bass Reeves – Kelley Curry (Paramount+); Power Book III: Raising Kanan – Anita Gibson and Erin Hicks (Starz)
Outstanding Production Design
Lawmen: Bass Reeves – Wynn Thomas (Paramount+); BMF – Nate Jones (Starz); Iwájú – Hamid Ibrahim (Disney+)

== Programs with multiple nominations and awards ==
The following programs received multiple nominations:

Nominations	Program
14	Genius: MLK/X
12	Abbott Elementary
7	Lawmen: Bass Reeves
7	Winning Time: The Rise of the Lakers Dynasty
6	Mr. & Mrs. Smith
6	Them: The Scare
5	I'm a Virgo
5	Run the World
5	Survival of the Thickest
5	The Ms. Pat Show
4	Diarra from Detroit
4	Power Book III: Raising Kanan
4	The Bear
3	Black Cake
3	Fellow Travelers
3	Kingdom Business
3	Ladies First: A Story of Women in Hip-Hop
3	Swagger
3	The Chi
3	The Equalizer
3	The Gilded Age
3	The Other Black Girl
3	X-Men '97
2	Average Joe
2	Curb Your Enthusiasm
2	Gen V
2	Great Performances: Purlie Victorious
2	Lessons in Chemistry
2	Loki
2	Loot
2	Lupin
2	Special Ops: Lioness
2	The Morning Show
2	True Detective
2	Super Bowl LVIII Halftime Show

The following programs received multiple awards:

Wins	Film
7	Genius: MLK/X
3	Abbott Elementary
3	Lawmen: Bass Reeves
2	The Bear
2	Black Cake
2	Mr. & Mrs. Smith
