= The Last Repair Shop =

2023 short documentary film by Ben Proudfoot and Kris Bowers

- Official poster
- Directed by: Ben Proudfoot; Kris Bowers
- Produced by: Ben Proudfoot; Jeremy Lambert; Josh Rosenberg; Kris Bowers
- Starring: Dana Atkinson; Paty Moreno; Duane Michaels; Steve Bagmanyan
- Cinematography: David Feeney-Mosier
- Edited by: Nick Garnham Wright
- Music by: Katya Richardson (score); Kris Bowers (themes)
- Production company: Breakwater Studios
- Distributed by: Searchlight Pictures; L.A. Times Studios
- Release date: September 1, 2023 (Telluride)
- Running time: 40 minutes
- Country: United States
- Language: English

The Last Repair Shop is a 2023 American short documentary film directed and produced by Ben Proudfoot and Kris Bowers. Produced by Breakwater Studios, the film had its premiere on September 1, 2023, at the 50th Telluride Film Festival. On March 10, 2024, it won the Academy Award for Best Documentary Short Film at the 96th Academy Awards.

== Summary ==
Since 1959, Los Angeles has been one of the few United States cities to offer and fix musical instruments for its public school students at no cost. Those instruments, numbering around 80,000, are maintained at a Los Angeles downtown warehouse by a handful of craftspeople. The film profiles four of them, each specializing in an orchestra section, as well as students whose lives have been enriched by the repair shop's work. The film concludes with a performance by district alumni.

== Production ==
Proudfoot and Bowers previously co-directed A Concerto Is a Conversation, a 2021 Oscar nominee in the short documentary category. The film's producer, Jeremy Lambert, passed along an article on the Los Angeles Unified School District (LAUSD)'s 64-year-old instrument repair workshop.

The workshop, much smaller than Bowers had imagined when he was an LAUSD student, became the subject of the film, including profiles of four of the workshop's craftspeople. Bowers, whose first instrument was a school-provided saxophone, felt they should also profile students. Among the staff interviewed was Steve Bagmanyan, a piano technician and an Armenian refugee from Azerbaijan, who had tuned the pianos Bowers had used in elementary and middle school. A number of the students interviewed in the film are from the Colburn School, a music and arts school in Los Angeles which Bowers also attended. One of those featured students was violinist Porché Brinker; she shared the stage with Proudfoot and Bowers when they were awarded the Oscar.

== Release ==
The film had its world premiere on September 1, 2023, at the 50th Telluride Film Festival in the 'Main Slate: Episodic Form and Short Form' section. On September 24, it won Best Documentary Short Film at the 2023 Calgary International Film Festival.

It was screened at the Middleburg Film Festival in October 2023. In that same month, Searchlight Pictures and L.A. Times Studios acquired the film, making it available for free on the Los Angeles Times YouTube channel and website on November 8, 2023, and on Disney+ and related platforms worldwide on January 23, 2024.

On February 16, 2024, the film was screened on more than 700 screens in the U.S. and Canada as part of ShortsTV's 19th Annual Oscar Nominated Short Films theatrical release. The following day, the film aired on American Broadcasting Company owned television stations and select affiliates. It is the first Oscar-nominated short documentary to air on television.

== Impact of the film on social milieu ==
As a result of donations prompted by the short, the LAUSD Education Foundation is embarking on a $15 million campaign to benefit the musical instrument repair operation documented in The Last Repair Shop. The fund will support the workshop and its staff, and also sponsor a training program for students who will become future instrument technicians.

== Original soundtrack ==
The Last Repair Shop

Soundtrack album by Katya Richardson and Kris Bowers
- Released: November 24, 2023
- Recorded: 2023
- Genre: Soundtrack
- Length: 29:54
- Language: English
- Label: Lakeshore Records
Audio Full Album
- The Last Repair Shop (Original Score)

All music is composed by Katya Richardson and Kris Bowers, except where noted.

There are 22 tracks in the album:
No.	Title	Artist	Length
1.	"The Last Repair Shop"		2:06
2.	"Dana: Strings"	Richardson	0:38
3.	"It's Hard Being a Kid"	Richardson	0:40
4.	"I Thought I Was Broken"		1:13
5.	"Practice Makes Perfect"		0:38
6.	"I'm Still Here"		0:48
7.	"Paty: Brass"	Richardson	0:59
8.	"My Story"		1:13
9.	"American Dream"		0:57
10.	"My Son"		0:51
11.	"The Test"		1:54
12.	"All These Years"		1:29
13.	"Duane: Woodwinds"		0:56
14.	"Frankenstein"	Richardson	0:31
15.	"Swap Meet"	Richardson	1:04
16.	"Dream a Little"	Richardson	0:36
17.	"Steve: Pianos"		2:13
18.	"Baku, 1987"		1:46
19.	"We Left Everything"		1:26
20.	"See How Life Is?"		2:02
21.	"I Love the Violin"	Richardson	2:02
22.	"The Alumni"	Bowers	3:45
Total length:			29:00

== Accolades ==
Award	Date of ceremony	Category	Recipient(s)	Result	Ref.
Calgary International Film Festival	October 1, 2023	Best Documentary Short Film	The Last Repair Shop	Won	
Middleburg Film Festival	October 22, 2023	Sheila Johnson Vanguard Award	Kris Bowers	Won	
Critics' Choice Documentary Awards	November 12, 2023	Best Short Documentary	The Last Repair Shop	Won	
Critics' Choice Documentary Awards	November 12, 2023	Best Score	Katya Richardson & Kris Bowers	Nominated	
Hollywood Music in Media Awards	November 15, 2023	Best Original Score – Short Film (Documentary)	The Last Repair Shop	Nominated	
Astra Film and Creative Awards	January 6, 2024	Best Short Film	The Last Repair Shop	Nominated	
Black Reel Awards	January 16, 2024	Outstanding Independent Short Film	The Last Repair Shop	Nominated	
Academy Awards	March 10, 2024	Best Documentary Short Film	Ben Proudfoot and Kris Bowers	Won	

=== Critics' lists ===
Publisher	Year	Listicle	Placement	Ref.
Variety	2023	Shorts showcase of 15 titles at Doc NYC	Included	
17th Cinema Eye Honors	2023	Shorts List (Cinema Eye's Annual List of the Year's Top Short Documentaries)	Included	

== See also ==
- Academy Award for Best Documentary Short Film
- Submissions for Best Documentary Short Academy Award
