= Black Reel Award for Outstanding Independent Short Film =

Motion picture award for short film

Black Reel Award for Outstanding Short Film
- Country: United States
- Presented by: The Black Reel Awards (BRAs)
- First award: Black Reel Awards of 2010
- Most recent winner: Canvas (Black Reel Awards of 2021)
- Website: blackreelawards.com

This article lists the winners and nominees for the Black Reel Award for Outstanding Independent Short Film. This award is given to the directors and was first awarded during the 2010 ceremony. Notable winners and nominees includes Spike Lee, Gabourey Sidibe, Matthew A. Cherry & Ryan Coogler.

== Winners and nominees ==
Winners are listed first and highlighted in bold.

=== 2010s ===
Year	Film	Director	Ref
2010
2010	**(Mis)leading Man**	**Morocco Omari**	
2010	Life on Earth	Jeffrey Keith	
2010	The Roe Effect	Kiel Adrian Scott	
2011
2011	**Katrina's Son**	**Ya'Ke Smith**	
2011	Stag & Doe	Daniel Patterson	
2011	Cred	Sherman Payne	
2012
2012	**Wake**	**Bree Newsome**	
2012	The Abyss Boys	Jan-Hendrik Beetge	
2012	Fig	Ryan Coogler	
2012	The Tombs	Jerry Lamothe	
2012	Wolf Call	Rob Underhill	
2013
2013	**The Bluest Note**	**Maruqes Green**	
2013	Crossover	Tina Mabry	
2013	Last/First Kiss	Andrea Ashton	
2013	Record/Play	Jesse Atlas	
2013	White Space	Maya Washington	
2014
2014	**Black Girl in Paris**	**Kiandra Parks**	
2014	A Different Tree	Steven Caple Jr.	
2014	African Cowboy	Rodney Charles	
2014	Sweet Honey Chile	Talibah Newman	
2014	They Die by the Dawn	Jeymes Samuel	
2015
2015	**#AmeriCan**	**Nate Parker**	
2015	Muted	Rachel Goldberg	
2015	The Voodoo	Steven Alexander	
2016
2016	**Addiction**	**Danny Dzhurayev**	
2016	David's Reviere	Neil Creque Williams	
2016	Sacred Heart	Sol Aponte and Jennia Fredrique	
2017
2017	**$15 Kicks**	**Jenn Shaw**	
2017	#Whereisbeauty	Angela McCrae	
2017	2 Fists Up	Spike Lee	
2017	86-32	Randy Wilkins	
2017	Black Card	Pete Chatmon	
2018
2018	**Oscar Micheaux**	**JD Walker**	
2018	90 Days	Jennia Fredrique & Nathan Hale Williams	
2018	Amelia's Closet	Halima Lucas	
2018	GEMA	Kendrick Price	
2018	See You Yesterday	Stefon Bristol	
2019
2019	**The Tale of Four**	**Gabourey Sidibe**	
2019	Funk Force	Desmond Levi Jackson	
2019	Hair Wolf	Mariama Diallo	
2019	Jump	Kofi Siriboe	
2019	WTFIMH: What the Fuck is Mental Health	Kofi Siriboe	

=== 2020s ===
Year	Film	Director	Ref
2020
2020	**Hair Love**	**Matthew A. Cherry**	
2020	America	Garrett Bradley	
2020	It's Not About Jimmy Keene	Caleb Jaffe	
2020	Suicide by Sunlight	Nikyatu Jusu	
2020	Zahra and the Oil Man	Yucef Mayes	
2021
2021	**Canvas**	**Frank E. Abney III**	
2021	Brother	Ya'Ke Smith	
2021	The Cypher	Letia Solomon	
2021	Grab My Hand: A Letter to My Dad	Camrus Johnson	
2021	The Pandemic Chronicles	Ya'Ke Smith	
2022
2022	**Coffee**	**Jordan Pitt**	
2022	54 Years Late	Michele Wise Wright	
2022	The Door of Return	Kokutekeleza Musebeni & Anna Zhukovets	
2022	Junior	Jehnovah Carlisle	
2022	The Snakes	Michelle Beck	
2023
2023	**North Star**	**P.J. Palmer**	
2023	Angola Do You Hear Us? Voices from a Plantation Prison	Cinque Northern	
2023	Elegy: My Two Months in Harlem	Andre Lambertson	
2023	Fannie	Christine Swanson	
2023	New Moon	Jeremie Balais, Raúl Domingo and Jeffig Le Bars	
2024
2024	**Black Girls Play: The Story of Hand Games**	**Joe Brewster, Michèle Stephenson**	
2024	The Last Repair Shop	Ben Proudfoot, Kris Bowers	
2024	ALIVE IN BRONZE: Huey P. Newton	A.K. Sandhu	
2024	Birthing A Nation: The Resistance of Mary Gaffney	Nazenet Habtezghi	
2024	The Dads	Luchina Fisher	
2025
2025	**Chocolate with Sprinkles**	**Huriyyah Muhammad**	
2025	Mosiah	Jirard	
2025	On a Sunday at Eleven	Alicia K. Harris	
2025	Self	Searit Kahsay Huluf	
2025	Will I See You Again?	Michael Perez-Lindsey	

== Multiple nominations and wins ==
=== Multiple nominations ===
2 Nominations

- Jennia Fredrique
- Kofi Siriboe
- Ya'Ke Smith
