= Kris Bowers =

American composer and director (born 1989)

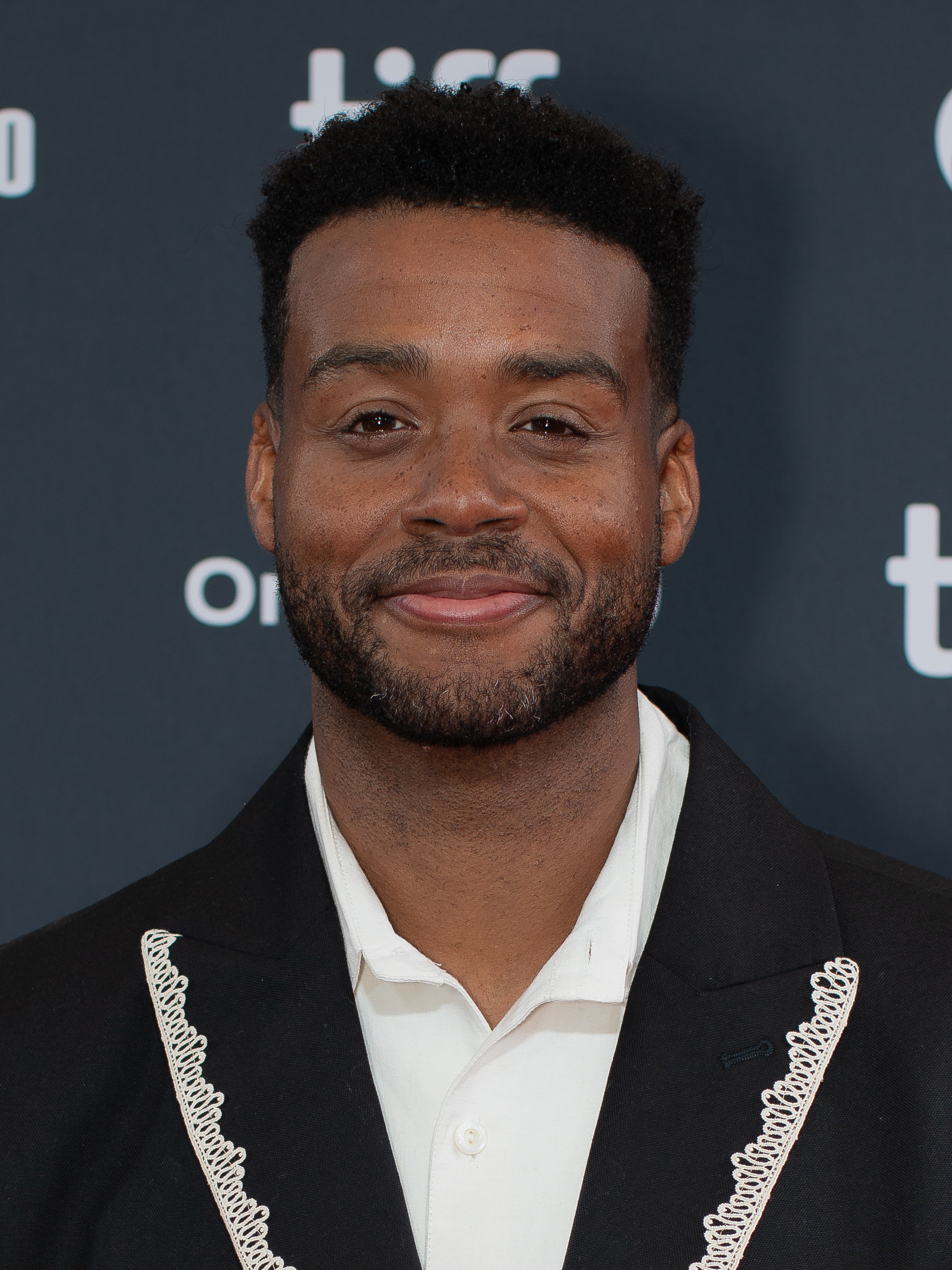
- Bowers in 2024

Background information
- Born: Kristopher Bowers; April 5, 1989 (age 37); Los Angeles, California, U.S.
- Genres: Film score, jazz, electronic, new-age
- Occupations: Composer, musician
- Instruments: Piano, keyboards, synthesizer
- Years active: 2010–present
- Spouse: Briana Henry (m. 2020)
- Website: krisbowers.com

Kristopher Bowers (born April 5, 1989) is an American composer, pianist, and documentary filmmaker. He has composed scores for films including Green Book, Space Jam: A New Legacy, King Richard, The Color Purple, The Wild Robot, Goat and Hexed, and television series Bridgerton, Mrs. America, Dear White People, When They See Us, Secret Invasion and Spider-Noir.

At the 96th Academy Awards, Bowers won the Academy Award for Best Documentary Short Film for The Last Repair Shop, along with his co-director Ben Proudfoot. Their previous collaboration, A Concerto Is a Conversation, also received a nomination at the 93rd Academy Awards.

Bowers is the recipient of the Daytime Emmy Award for Outstanding Music Direction and Composition for Amazon Prime Video's adaptation of The Snowy Day. He has garnered multiple nominations at the Primetime Creative Arts Emmy Awards, Grammy Awards, and Critics' Choice Awards.

During his career, Bowers has recorded, performed and collaborated with José James, Jay-Z, and Alicia Keys. He has also collaborated with filmmakers Blitz Bazawule, Ava DuVernay, Reinaldo Marcus Green, Malcolm D. Lee, Chris Sanders, and Justin Simien.

== Early life and education ==
Bowers was born in Los Angeles, California, on April 5, 1989. His father is a film and television writer, and his mother is an executive at DirecTV. Although neither of his parents received more than a high school education, they wanted their son to play the piano, so they played recordings of pianists while he was still in the womb.

Bowers began piano lessons at the age of 4 and private classical music lessons starting at around the age of 9. Growing up, Bowers listened to "classic soul records and hip-hop before falling under the spell of jazz, classical music, and film scores."

Bowers studied jazz and classical piano at Los Angeles County High School for the Arts where his teachers included Mulgrew Miller and Donald Vega. He studied jazz at Colburn School for Performing Arts. He graduated in 2006, then attended Juilliard and obtained a bachelor's and master's degree in jazz performance. While a student, he performed frequently in New York City.

== Career ==
=== 2011–2016: Early career as a performer ===
Bowers played on Jay-Z and Kanye West's 2011 album Watch the Throne, and later toured with Marcus Miller throughout 2012. Bowers' debut album, Heroes + Misfits (Concord, 2014), premiered at No. 1 on the iTunes Jazz charts. One AllMusic reviewer commented that Bowers was "based in jazz but with an ear for contemporary R&B, film scores, and electronic music". Bowers' first film composition was for the 2013 documentary Elaine Stritch: Shoot Me. In 2014, Bowers performed at the International Jazz Day Concert in Japan, the Festival de Jazz de Vitoria-Gasteiz in Spain, and at the London Jazz Festival.

Bowers' work on the showtime documentary Kobe Bryant's Muse (2015) gained him attention as an up-and-coming composer well-versed in a wide range of compositional styles. In the same year, he scored two other Showtime documentaries: I Am Giant, about the football player Victor Cruz, and Play It Forward, about Tony Gonzalez. He was one of six composers invited to the Sundance Composers Lab in 2015. Bowers also teamed up with the choreographer Kyle Abraham, to create Absent Matter, which premiered at the Joyce Theater in New York City. During the following year, Bowers and Abraham collaborated again on Untitled America for Alvin Ailey.

Bowers performed at The White House in 2016 for the International Jazz Day Concert hosted by President Barack and First Lady Michelle Obama.

Bowers has also paired his music with immersive dining experiences; in 2016, he was hired by Bang & Olufsen to create a score to accompany a multi-course meal prepared by chef Fredrik Berselius, founder of Aska. The next year, Krug commissioned Bowers to write compositions inspired by and paired with one of their signature champagnes.

=== 2017–2019: Focus on scoring for film and TV ===
Bowers developed his scoring career across film and TV with the 2017 documentary Norman Lear: Just Another Version of You and the film Little Boxes, as well as the television programs Religion of Sports and Dear White People. Bowers' music for the Amazon children's Christmas special, The Snowy Day (2016), based on the 1962 book of the same title by Ezra Jack Keats, won him a Daytime Emmy for Outstanding Music Direction and Composition. For his score to Ava DuVernay's mini-series When They See Us (2019), Bowers received his first Primetime Creative Arts Emmy Awards nomination for Outstanding Music Composition for a Limited or Anthology Series, Movie or Special.

Bowers composed the score for Green Book (2019), earning him a nomination for the Critics' Choice Movie Award for Best Score. Green Book was ultimately nominated for five awards at the 91st Academy Awards, winning three awards for Best Picture, Best Original Screenplay and Best Supporting Actor for Mahershala Ali. For the film, Bowers also served as Ali's on-screen hand-double for the film's piano close-up shots and taught Ali to play piano.

=== 2020–present: Oscar success and emergence into directing ===
Bowers' debut as a director began with A Concerto Is a Conversation (2020), a documentary short film he co-directed with Ben Proudfoot. Centering on Bowers' conversations with his grandfather about personal and family history, the film premiered at the 2021 Sundance Film Festival and received an Academy Award nomination for Best Documentary (Short Subject) at the 93rd Academy Awards.

For their next collaboration, The Last Repair Shop (2023), Bowers and Proudfoot won an Academy Award for Best Documentary Short Film. The film spotlights some of the individuals working at the Los Angeles Unified School District’s music instrument repair shop, the last to provide free instrument repairs to the city’s public school students. Following The Last Repair Shop’s success, Bowers and Proudfoot launched a $15 million capital campaign, in partnership with the LAUSD Education Foundation, to support the music education of the next generation of Angelenos.

In 2022, the Monterey Jazz Festival commissioned a composition from Bowers, which he presented at the annual event. The piece, Ásylo (Greek for sanctuary), commemorates the 30th anniversary of the nearby Monterey National Marine Sanctuary. Bowers had previously performed at the festival as a high school student for three years starting in 2003.

Since 2020, Bowers has composed the score for Netflix's period drama, Bridgerton. Upon each season's release, Bridgerton has been the most-watched or among the most-watched original series launch on the service. For his work on the show, Bowers received Primetime Emmy nominations for Outstanding Music Composition for a Series and Outstanding Original Main Title Theme Music. He also produced two original soundtracks for Netflix's Queen Charlotte: A Bridgerton Story (2023): the first as the series' score, and the second with classical reinterpretations of pop songs. Bowers collaborated with Alicia Keys to reimagine her song "If I Ain't Got You" for the album's lead single.

Bowers's film scoring work accelerated in this period with Justin Simien's comedy horror film Bad Hair (2020), Space Jam: A New Legacy (2021) and the Chevalier (2022). In 2023, Bowers scored three films and two television projects, including Haunted Mansion, Origin, The Color Purple, Secret Invasion, and Queen Charlotte: A Bridgerton Story, continuing his working relationship with Justin Simien and Ava DuVernay. Bowers' score for The Color Purple garnered a Grammy nomination for Best Score Soundtrack for Visual Media.

Bowers received further acclaim for his score for DreamWorks Animation’s The Wild Robot (2024), which garnered nominations from the Academy Awards, Golden Globes, Critics’ Choice Awards, and BAFTAs, as well as the award for Outstanding Original Score for a Studio Film from the Society of Composers and Lyricists (SCL).

== Artistry ==
The New York Times' 2011 review of one of Bowers' early shows as a bandleader referred to his playing as "serious, thoughtful, organized, restrained; he made the piano sound good. His set had range and ambition and said something strong, sweet, and normative about phrasing and rhythm in jazz right now."

Bowers' influences include "Oscar Peterson, Wynton Kelly ('for his comping and incredible feel'), Duke Ellington ('for his compositions'), Ahmad Jamal and Count Basie", as well as John Williams.

== Awards and honors ==
Ceremony	Year	Category	Nominated work	Result	Ref.
Academy Awards	2021	Best Documentary Short Subject	A Concerto Is a Conversation (with Ben Proudfoot)	Nominated	
Academy Awards	2024	Best Documentary Short Subject	The Last Repair Shop (with Ben Proudfoot)	Won	
Academy Awards	2025	Best Original Score	The Wild Robot	Nominated	
African-American Film Critics Association Awards	2024	Best Music	The Color Purple	Won	
African-American Film Critics Association Awards	2025	Best Original Score	The Wild Robot	Won	
Annie Awards	2025	Outstanding Achievement for Music in a Feature Production	The Wild Robot	Won	
Astra Film and Creative Awards	2024	Best Short Film	The Last Repair Shop	Nominated	
Astra Film and Creative Awards	2025	Artisan Achievement Award	Himself	Honoree	
Astra Film and Creative Awards	2025	Best Original Score	The Wild Robot	Nominated	
Black Reel Awards	2019	Outstanding Music (Comedy, Drama or Limited Series)	When They See Us	Nominated	
Black Reel Awards	2022	Outstanding Original Score	Respect	Nominated	
Black Reel Awards	2022	Outstanding Musical Score (TV Movie or Limited Series)	Bridgerton	Nominated	
Black Reel Awards	2024	Outstanding Original Score	Chevalier	Nominated	
Black Reel Awards	2024	Outstanding Original Score	The Color Purple	Won	
Black Reel Awards	2024	Outstanding Independent Short Film	The Last Repair Shop (directior with Ben Proudfoot)	Nominated	
Black Reel Awards	2025	Outstanding Score	The Wild Robot	Won	
Calgary International Film Festival	2023	Best Documentary Short Film	The Last Repair Shop	Won	
Celebration of Black Cinema and Television	2024	Composer Award	The Wild Robot	Won	
Critics' Choice Awards	2018	Best Score	Green Book	Nominated	
Critics' Choice Awards	2025	Best Score	The Wild Robot	Nominated	
Critics' Choice Documentary Awards	2023	Best Short Documentary	The Last Repair Shop	Won	
Critics' Choice Documentary Awards	2023	Best Score	The Last Repair Shop	Nominated	
Dallas–Fort Worth Film Critics Association	2024	Best Musical Score	The Wild Robot	Won	
Daytime Emmy Award	2017	Outstanding Music Direction and Composition	The Snowy Day (with Rossanna S. Wright)	Won	
Golden Globe Award	2025	Best Original Score	The Wild Robot	Nominated	
Grammy Awards	2020	Best Arrangement, Instrumental or A Cappella	"Blue Skies"	Nominated	
Grammy Awards	2022	Best Score Soundtrack for Visual Media	Bridgerton: Season 1	Nominated	
Grammy Awards	2025	Best Score Soundtrack for Visual Media	The Color Purple	Nominated	
Grammy Awards	2026	Best Score Soundtrack for Visual Media	The Wild Robot	Nominated	
Hollywood Music in Media Awards	2018	Best Original Score in a Feature Film	Green Book	Nominated	
Hollywood Music in Media Awards	2019	Best Original Score in a TV Show/Limited Series	When They See Us	Won	
Hollywood Music in Media Awards	2021	Best Original Score in a Feature Film	King Richard	Nominated	
Hollywood Music in Media Awards	2021	Best Original Song in a TV Show/Limited Series	"Together All the Way" from Dear White People (with Siedah Garrett)	Nominated	
Hollywood Music in Media Awards	2023	Best Original Score in a Feature Film	Chevalier	Nominated	
Hollywood Music in Media Awards	2023	Best Original Score – Short Film (Documentary)	The Last Repair Shop (with Katya Richardson)	Nominated	
Hollywood Music in Media Awards	2023	Best Main Title Theme – TV Show/Limited Series	Queen Charlotte: A Bridgerton Story	Nominated	
Hollywood Music in Media Awards	2024	Best Original Score – Animated Film	The Wild Robot	Won	
Hollywood Music in Media Awards	2024	Best Exhibitions, Theme Parks or Special Projects	Dreaming Freedom (as part of musicians)	Nominated	
Middleburg Film Festival	2023	Sheila Johnson Vanguard Award	Himself	Won	
NAACP Image Awards	2023	Outstanding Soundtrack/Compilation Album	Bridgerton Season Two (Soundtrack from the Netflix Series)	Nominated	
NAACP Image Awards	2024	Outstanding Original Score for TV/Film	Kris Bowers	Nominated	
Primetime Creative Arts Emmy Awards	2019	Outstanding Music Composition for a Limited Series, Movie or Special (Original Dramatic Score)	"Part 2" in When They See Us	Nominated	
Primetime Creative Arts Emmy Awards	2020	Outstanding Music Composition for a Limited Series, Movie or Special (Original Dramatic Score)	"Reagan" in Mrs. America	Nominated	
Primetime Creative Arts Emmy Awards	2021	Outstanding Original Main Title Theme Music	Bridgerton (with Michael Dean Parsons)	Nominated	
Primetime Creative Arts Emmy Awards	2021	Outstanding Music Composition for a Series (Original Dramatic Score)	"Diamond of the First Water" in Bridgerton	Nominated	
Primetime Creative Arts Emmy Awards	2026	Outstanding Music Composition for a Series (Original Dramatic Score)	"Step Into My Office" in Spider-Noir (with Michael Dean Parsons)	Nominated	
San Francisco International Film Festival	2021	Best Family Film	A Concerto Is a Conversation (with Ben Proudfoot)	Nominated	
San Francisco International Film Festival	2021	Special Jury Award	A Concerto Is a Conversation (with Ben Proudfoot)	Won	
San Francisco International Film Festival	2024	Best Original Score	The Wild Robot	Nominated	
Satellite Awards	2025	Best Original Score	The Wild Robot	Nominated	
Seattle Film Critics Society Awards	2024	Best Original Score	The Wild Robot	Nominated	
Society of Composers & Lyricists Awards	2020	Outstanding Original Score for a Television or Streaming Production	When They See Us	Nominated	
Society of Composers & Lyricists Awards	2022	Outstanding Original Song for a Comedy or Musical Visual Media Production	"Together All the Way" in Dear White People (with Siedah Garrett)	Nominated	
Society of Composers & Lyricists Awards	2025	Outstanding Original Score for a Studio Film	The Wild Robot	Won	
St. Louis Film Critics Association	2024	Best Score	The Wild Robot	Nominated	
Thelonious Monk International Jazz Piano Competition	2011	Himself		Won	
Washington D.C. Area Film Critics Association	2024	Best Original Score	The Wild Robot	Nominated	
World Soundtrack Awards	2019	Discovery of the Year	Green Book	Nominated	
World Soundtrack Awards	2019	Television Composer of the Year	When They See Us	Nominated	
World Soundtrack Awards	2025	Film Composer of the Year	The Wild Robot	Nominated	

Honor

- Honor - DownBeat magazine: “25 for the Future”, 2016
- Honor - ROBIE Pioneer Award from the Jackie Robinson Foundation, 2019.

== Filmography ==
=== Films ===
Year	Title	Director	Notes
2016	Little Boxes	Rob Meyer	
2018	Monsters and Men	Reinaldo Marcus Green	First collaboration with Reinaldo Marcus Green
2018	Green Book	Peter Farrelly	
2020	Bad Hair	Justin Simien	First collaboration with Justin Simien
2021	The United States vs. Billie Holiday	Lee Daniels	
2021	Space Jam: A New Legacy	Malcolm D. Lee	
2021	Respect	Liesl Tommy	
2021	King Richard	Reinaldo Marcus Green	Second collaboration with Reinaldo Marcus Green
2022	Chevalier	Stephen Williams	
2023	Haunted Mansion	Justin Simien	Second collaboration with Justin Simien
2023	Origin	Ava DuVernay	
2023	The Color Purple	Blitz Bazawule	Original songs by Brenda Russell, Allee Willis and Stephen Bray
2024	Bob Marley: One Love	Reinaldo Marcus Green	Third collaboration with Reinaldo Marcus Green
2024	The Wild Robot	Chris Sanders	First score for an animated film
2026	Goat	Tyree Dillihay	
2026	Steps	Alyce Tzue; John Ripa	Original songs by Justin Tranter
2026	Hexed	Jason Hand; Fawn Veerasunthorn	
2026	Mr. Irrelevant	Jonathan Levine	

=== Television ===
Year	Title	Network	Notes
2016	American Masters	PBS	Episode "Norman Lear: Just Another Version of You"
2016	The Snowy Day	Amazon Studios	TV special Daytime Emmy Award for Outstanding Music Direction and Composition
2016	Religion of Sports	DirecTV	Composed for 4 episodes
2017–2021	Dear White People	Netflix	
2018	Warriors of Liberty City	Starz	TV series documentary
2018–2019	For the People	ABC	
2019	When They See Us	Netflix	TV miniseries Nominated — Primetime Emmy Award for Outstanding Music Composition (for "Part 2")
2019–2022	Raising Dion	Netflix	
2019–2021	Black Monday	Showtime	
2019	Star Trek: Short Treks	CBS All Access	Episode "The Girl Who Made the Stars"
2020	Mrs. America	FX on Hulu	TV miniseries Nominated — Primetime Emmy Award for Outstanding Music Composition for a Limited or Anthology Series, Movie or Special (Original Dramatic Score) (for "Reagan")
2020	Bridgerton	Netflix	Nominated — Primetime Emmy Award for Outstanding Music Composition for a Series (Original Dramatic Score) (for "Diamond of the First Water"); Nominated — Primetime Emmy Award for Outstanding Original Main Title Theme Music; Nominated — Grammy Award for Best Score Soundtrack for Visual Media
2021	Colin in Black & White	Netflix	
2022	Inventing Anna	Netflix	TV miniseries
2022	DMZ	HBO Max	TV miniseries
2022	We Own This City	HBO	TV miniseries
2023	Queen Charlotte: A Bridgerton Story	Netflix	TV miniseries
2023	Secret Invasion	Disney+	TV miniseries
2026	The Punisher: One Last Kill	Disney+	Television special; Fourth collaboration with Reinaldo Marcus Green
2026	Spider-Noir	MGM+	Nominated — Primetime Emmy Award for Outstanding Music Composition for a Series (Original Dramatic Score) (for "Step Into My Office")

=== Documentaries ===
Year	Title	Director	Notes
2013	Seeds of Time	Sandy McLeod	
2013	Elaine Stritch: Shoot Me	Chiemi Karasawa	Credited as Kristopher Bowers
2015	Kobe Bryant's Muse	Gotham Chopra	
2015	I Am Giant: Victor Cruz	Gotham Chopra	
2015	Play It Forward	Andrea Blaugrund Nevins	
2017	Copwatch	Camilla Hall	
2021	A Concerto Is a Conversation	Co-director with Ben Proudfoot and composer	
2023	The Last Repair Shop	Co-director with Ben Proudfoot and theme music composer	Score by Katya Richardson; Won Academy Award for Best Documentary Short Film
2025	The Eyes of Ghana	Ben Proudfoot	

=== Video games ===
Year	Title	Studio	Notes
2019	Madden NFL 20	EA Sports	
2020	Madden NFL 21	EA Sports	
2024	EA Sports College Football 25	EA Sports	Campus Clash Theme only

== Discography ==
An asterisk (*) indicates that the year is that of release.

=== As leader/co-leader ===
Year recorded	Title	Label	Personnel/Notes
2012	Heroes + Misfits	Concord	With Adam Agati (guitar), Burniss Earl Travis II (electric bass), Jamire Williams (drums); some tracks with Casey Benjamin (alto sax, vocoder) added; some tracks with Kenneth Whalum (tenor sax) added; vocalists added are Chris Turner (3 tracks), Julia Easterlin (1 track), José James (1 track)

=== As sideman ===
Year recorded	Leader	Title	Label
2010–11	Jay Z and Kanye West	Watch the Throne	Roc-A-Fella, Roc Nation, Def Jam
2013*	Etienne Charles	Creole Soul	Culture Shock
2013*	Next Collective	Cover Art	Concord
2014*	Robin Eubanks	Klassik Rock, Vol. 1	Artist Share
2014*	José James	While You Were Sleeping	Blue Note
2014*	Takuya Kuroda	Rising Son	Blue Note
2014*	Harvey Mason	Chameleon	Concord Jazz
2016*	A Tribe Called Quest	We Got It from Here... Thank You 4 Your Service	Epic
2017*	Maurice Brown	The Mood	Ropeadope
