= Laura Fusetti =

Italian footballer (born 1990)

Personal information
- Full name: Laura Fusetti
- Date of birth: 8 October 1990 (age 36)
- Place of birth: Segrate, Italy
- Height: 1.66 m (5 ft 5 1/2 in)
- Positions: Midfielder; defender

Senior career*
Years	Team	Apps	(Gls)
2007–2009	A.C.F.D. Tradate	19	(0)
2009–2017	Como	196	(16)
2017–2018	Brescia	23	(0)
2018–2024	AC Milan	107	(2)

International career
2008	Italy U19	4	(0)
2017–2020	Italy	7	(0)
- * Club domestic league appearances and goals

Laura Fusetti (born 8 October 1990) is an Italian former footballer who plays as midfielder and defender.

== Career ==
=== Club ===
Fusetti started playing football with the men's oratory team. At the age of thirteen, she moved to the women's team of Tradate Abbiate. In 2009, Fusetti signed with Como 2000 where in her last season she wore the captain's armband. In the summer of 2017, she moved to Brescia, giving her the opportunity to make her debut in the UEFA Women's Champions League.

In 2018 she moved to newly formed AC Milan Women.

=== International ===
In July 2008, Fusetti won the UEFA Women's Under-19 Championship with the Italian team, playing four games in the final phase.

She was also part of the squad that represented Italy at the UEFA Women's Euro 2017.

Fusetti was called up to the Italy squad for the 2019 FIFA Women's World Cup.
