= Seeds of Time (film) =

Documentary film

- Film poster
- Directed by: Sandy McLeod
- Produced by: Stanley F. Buchthal; Abigail E. Disney; Dallas Brennan; Chiemi Karasawa; Sandy McLeod; J.D. Marlow; Jessica M. Thompson; Emily Triantaphyllis
- Starring: Cary Fowler
- Cinematography: Henrik Edelbo Sørensen
- Edited by: J.D. Marlow; John W. Walter
- Music by: Kris Bowers
- Distributed by: Kino Lorber
- Release date: November 10, 2013 (Copenhagen)
- Running time: 77 minutes
- Country: United States
- Language: English

Seeds of Time is a 2013 feature length documentary film directed and produced by Sandy McLeod. The film had its North American premiere in South by Southwest Film Festival’s Documentary Spotlight, and its international premiere at CPH:DOX film festival in Copenhagen. Seeds of Time was also screened at Berlin International Film Festival, Margaret Mead Film Festival, Mountainfilm in Telluride, Seattle International Film Festival Full Frame Documentary Festival, and the Food Film Festival in Amsterdam. The film won the Audience Award at the San Francisco Green Film Festival, Best Film at the Portland Eco Film Festival, and Best Cinematography at the Costa Rica International Film Festival. It was selected to be viewed in Peru and Mongolia as part of a collaboration with UCLA and the State Department with American Film Showcase in 2016.

After viewing the film at South by Southwest, Amy Smith wrote for the Austin Chronicle: “The future of global food production in the face of climate change is not the sexiest topic for a filmmaker to pursue, yet Sandy McLeod succeeds in turning the complex subject of crop diversity and food security into a compelling and thought-provoking documentary”. The Margaret Mead Film Festival heralded the film by saying, “Seeds of Time stands out as truly exceptional. It's about an issue less prominent in the public dialogue but of universal importance... it's just riveting filmmaking, a story swiftly and beautifully told."

Seeds of Time is distributed by Kino Lorber.

== Synopsis ==
Seeds of Time follows agriculture pioneer Cary Fowler on his global journey to save the eroding foundation of our food supply in a new era of climate change.

Cary Fowler travels the world, educating the public about the dire consequences of our inaction. Along with his team at The Global Crop Diversity Trust in Rome, Cary struggles to envision and implement a sustainable food system. The foundation of such a scenario is a perpetual, secure seed bank. In his words, he is imagining a seed bank that “will last forever.” The film compellingly communicates the time pressure Cary is encountering in this visionary task. Accelerated climate change, political stagnation, and his own ongoing health crisis continuously complicate his efforts.
