= Mosiah (film) =

Independent historical film by Jirard

- Directed by: Jirard
- Screenplay by: Samuel Lee Fudge; Jirard
- Produced by: Alima Albari; Danielle Pockett Brown; Jirard
- Starring: Samuel Lee Fudge; Brit Scales; Glenn Allen; Todd Holmes; Ford Nelson; William Burch; Shevon Sutcliffe Thomas; Sharice Henry Lamb; Graylin Stuart Lutchy; Robert Laukaitis
- Cinematography: Jirard
- Edited by: Jirard
- Music by: Shaun Martin
- Production companies: Alima Industries Media Group; The Digibees
- Release date: September 30, 2023; (Detroit Black Film Festival)
- Running time: 40 minutes
- Country: United States
- Language: English

Mosiah is a 2023 American independent historical short film largely based on the 1923 US court trial of Marcus Mosiah Garvey. The film was directed by Jirard and co-written by the lead actor, Samuel Lee Fudge and Jirard.

The film's release on Amazon Prime Video was announced on January 19, 2025, to coincide with and commemorate the complete and unconditional pardon President Joe Biden issued to Garvey that same day.

The film was nominated for Best Short Film at the Black Reel Awards of 2025.

== Cast ==
- Samuel Lee Fudge as Marcus Mosiah Garvey
- Brit Scales as Amy Jacques Garvey
- Glenn Allen as Edward Young Clarke
- Todd Holmes as Maxwell S. Mattuck
- Ford Nelson as J. Edgar Hoover
- William Burch as Young Marcus
- Shevon Sutcliffe Thomas as Malchus Garvey
- Sharice Henry Lamb as Henrietta Vinton Davis
- Samsson Destahun as Orlando Thompson
- Robert Beecham as Elia Garcia
- Harold Derrick Lee as George Tobias
- Lanier Sullivan as James 'Jack' Wormley Jones
- Graylin Stuart Lutchy as Benny Dancy
- Lacorrie Mccarty as Cornelius McDougald
- Robert Laukaitis as Judge Julian Mack
