= Canvas (2020 film) =

- Promotional poster
- Directed by: Frank E. Abney III
- Written by: Frank E. Abney III
- Produced by: Paige Johnstone
- Music by: Jermaine Stegall
- Production companies: Netflix Animation Studios; Chainwheel Productions
- Distributed by: Netflix
- Release date: December 11, 2020
- Running time: 9 minutes
- Country: United States
- Language: English

Canvas is an American animated drama short film written and directed by Frank E. Abney III. It was released on December 11, 2020 on Netflix.

== Plot ==
A grandfather wakes up alone on the left of the bed with empty space on the right side of bed after losing his wife. He wheelchairs himself outside to greet his granddaughter who is dropped off by his daughter. The granddaughter gives him a drawing and he gives her a hug. His granddaughter spends the day drawing and trying to get her grandfather to paint again. However, the grandfather is still grieving and doesn't feel like painting. At night, his daughter picks up his granddaughter. The next day, his daughter drops his granddaughter off at his house again. The granddaughter is curious about what is behind the closet. She opens the door behind the closet and finds her grandfather's art studio. Inside the studio, she finds a painting of her grandmother. The grandfather wheelchair himself in the studio and is angry to find his granddaughter holding the painting. He snatches the painting out of her hands. As he touches the painting, a memory of his wife appears and they are dancing. He suddenly finds the inspirations to paint again.

== Production ==
Canvas was written and directed by Frank E. Abney III. It took six years for Abney III to make his passion project happened which centered the theme of grief. Canvas was inspired by his own life experiences such as losing his father at five years old and "how his family was affected by it". Paige Johnstone produced the short film. It was released on December 11, 2020 on Netflix. Jermaine Stegall is the composer of the short film.

== Reception ==
On October 14, 2020, IndieWire revealed that Netflix had been considering Canvas as one of its three contenders for the Academy Award for Best Animated Short Film, along with If Anything Happens I Love You and Cops and Robbers, to compete at the 93rd Academy Awards.

== Accolades ==
Canvas won the Outstanding Short Form (Animated) category at 52nd NAACP Image Awards. At the 21st Annual Black Reel Awards, the film won the Outstanding Independent Short Film category.
