= The Eyes of Ghana =

- Theatrical release poster
- Directed by: Ben Proudfoot
- Produced by: Ben Proudfoot; Nana Adwoa Frimpong; Anita Afonu; Moses Bwayo; Brandon Somerhalder; Darren Watkins
- Starring: Chris Hesse; Anita Afonu; Edmund Addo
- Cinematography: Brandon Somerhalder; David Feeney-Mosier
- Edited by: Monica Salazar
- Music by: Kris Bowers
- Production companies: Breakwater Studios; Higher Ground Productions
- Release dates: September 4, 2025 (TIFF); October 28, 2026 (United States)
- Running time: 90 minutes
- Country: United States

The Eyes of Ghana is an American documentary feature film directed by Ben Proudfoot and produced by IShowSpeed, with Barack Obama and Michelle Obama serving as executive producers. The film follows Chris Tsui Hesse, the personal cameraman to revolutionary leader Kwame Nkrumah, the first president of Ghana, who was deposed in a coup d'état in 1966. Having saved over 1,300 rolls of film from Nkrumah's enemies who sought to destroy them, Hesse, now in his nineties, passes them on to a protégé and together they attempt to hold a public screening of footage never seen in public before in Accra.

== Background ==
During the 1950s and 1960s, Chris Tsui Hesse served as the personal cameraman to Kwame Nkrumah, a revolutionary leader who went on to be deposed in the 1966 Ghanaian coup d'état. Following the coup, the new Ghanaian government burned many films recorded by Nkrumah's administration. However, Hesse saved over 1,300 reels of footage from his personal collection. This amounted to over 200 hours of film. The reels were stored in a vault in London.

During the production of a short documentary, titled Perished Diamonds, Anita Afonu met Hesse. After learning about the collection of reels, she explained to Hesse the process of digitization and suggested that he digitize the collection. In addition, Afonu expressed desire to restore The Rex, an outdoor theater in Accra. The theater was restored during the making of the film and later used as a filming location.

In 2021, Ben Proudfoot met Hesse while visiting Ghana as part of a UNICEF mission. Following the meeting, Hesse asked Proudfoot to digitize his collection of reels. Originally, Proudfoot intended to create a short film about Hesse. However, Ugandan filmmaker Moses Bwayo convinced him to turn the concept into a feature film.

During the course of production, some of the reels from Hesse's collection were digitized. However, much of the collection remains undigitized.

== Production ==
Some of Hesse's film reels were digitized for the production of the film. 15 minutes of digitized footage was used in the film.

The film was produced by Higher Ground Productions, a production company founded by Barack and Michelle Obama. In October 2026, American influencer Darren Watkins, who is of Ghanaian heritage and is better known as IShowSpeed, had signed on as a producer. Watkins said his role was to help bring the film to a wider audience.

The score was composed by Kris Bowers and performed by Chineke! Orchestra, as well as a set of Ghanaian musicians. The score was mixed at Abbey Road Studios.

== Release ==
The Eyes of Ghana premiered at the 2025 Toronto International Film Festival where it was the opening film at the festival's documentary sidebar. A one-night only screening of the film was held on October 28, 2026 at select theatres in the United States and Canada.

=== Streaming ===
The Eyes of Ghana was released on YouTube for free on November 17, 2026 after IShowSpeed got permission from Chris Tsui Hesse and Barack Obama to upload it on his channel

== Reception ==
On the review aggregator website Rotten Tomatoes, 94% of 16 critics' reviews are positive. Writing for IndieWire, Christian Zilko called the film a tribute to the way that film can change the world, as well as a tribute to both Nkrumah and Hesse. Wynne Bendell, writing for Daily Nexus, called the film "a love letter to film"

However, not all reviews were positive. Corey Atad, writing for Truthdig, criticized the film's use of the digitized footage, as well as how it was juxtaposed against talking head segments. Furthermore, Atad also accused the film of whitewashing Nkrumah, saying "What the film presents is a sanitized account of a revolutionary, a controversial figure made palatable for a liberal Western audience." Andy Howell, writing for Film Threat, while overall speaking positively of the movie, criticized it for failing to mention that Hesse continued to work as a filmographer for successive Ghanaian governments following the 1966 coup.

The film won the Audience Award for Best Documentary Feature at the Hamptons International Film Festival.
