= Rwanda and Juliet =

- Directed by: Ben Proudfoot
- Written by: Ben Proudfoot
- Produced by: Ben Proudfoot; Andrea Batists
- Cinematography: David Bolen; Douglas James Burgdorff; Ben Proudfoot
- Edited by: Michael Fallavollita
- Production company: Breakwater Studios
- Release date: April 8, 2016
- Running time: 88 minutes
- Countries: Canada; United States; Rwanda
- Language: English

Rwanda and Juliet is a post-Rwandan genocide documentary by Canadian producer Ben Proudfoot.

== Plot ==
The film follows the trip of Dartmouth College professor emeritus Andrew Garrod to Kigali where he tries to enlist descendants of the Hutu and Tutsi into performing the Shakespearean classic with hope that it could lead to their reconciliation.

== Reception ==
The film has been added to the curriculum of British Universities Film & Video Council. It has been screened at Meredith College, the student association of the USC Shoah Foundation.

== Festivals and screenings ==
2016 Rwanda Film Festival

2016 Wisconsin Film Festival

== Awards ==
The film won the best documentary at the 16th annual Phoenix Film Festival.
