= Desmond P. Murray =

British entomologist and writer

Desmond P. Murray (21 August 1887 - 2 March 1967) was a British entomologist and writer.

Murray was born of Irish parents in London. He was educated at Oratory School and was an ordained priest in St. Edmunds College in 1911. He spent seven years in the ministry of St. Francis, London and joined the English Province of the Dominican Order.

In 1924 he was sent to the Dominican Mission in South Africa in Witwatersrand in the Transvaal Province. He returned to England in 1928 and was stationed at Holy Cross, Leicester for 22 years. He was chaplain to a school at Avisford, Arundel (1950–1952) and a chaplain to Martin's Convent and school at Stoke Golding.

Murray was Curator in Entomology at Witwatersrand University. His collection of butterflies and moths are at the University Museum in Witwatersrand. He specialized on South African Lycaenidae and authored the book South African Butterflies in 1935. Murray wrote Species Revalued in 1955. In this work he suggested that natural selection cannot fully account for the mechanism of evolution.

== Selected publications ==
- A Forgotten Saint (1923)
- South African Butterflies (1935)
- Species Revalued (1955)
- A Saint of the Week (1957)
- The Life History of Nymphula Stagnata Donovan (1957)
