= Lindsay Crouse (journalist) =

American journalist and film producer

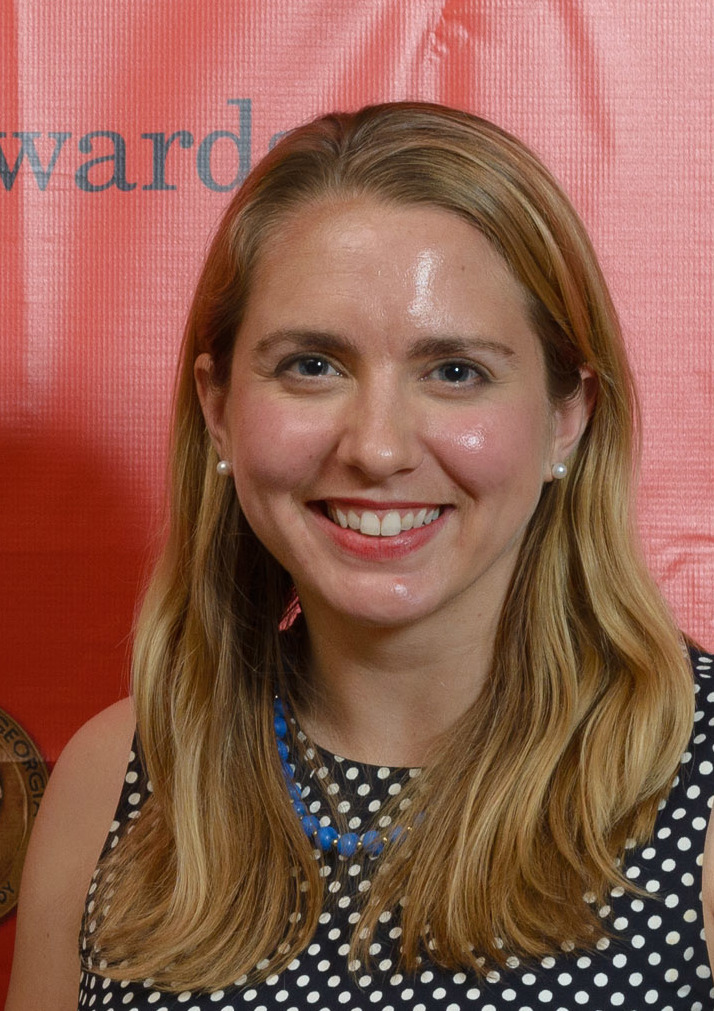
- Lindsay Crouse at the 2017 Peabody awards
- Born: 1984 (age 41–42); Rhode Island, U.S.
- Occupations: Journalist, film producer

Lindsay Crouse is an American journalist, film producer, and author. She is best-known for co-producing the documentaries 4.1 Miles and The Queen of Basketball, which won an award for Best Documentary Short Subject at the 2021 Academy Awards. She is a former senior editor and journalist at The New York Times.

Crouse grew up in South Kingstown, Rhode Island and graduated from Harvard University, where she competed in both track and field and cross country sports events.

== Career ==
Crouse first wrote about the choices faced by female athletes who also wanted to become mothers in October 2014. She wrote about how female athletes faced pressure to put their babies at risk and continue training and competing, while pregnant, and put their post-natal recoveries at risk.

In May 2019 Crouse reported on Nike's lack of maternity support for the female athletes it sponsors, which culminated in a congressional inquiry and modifications of Nike’s policies regarding pregnant athletes.

In November 2019, Crouse produced a video interview, and wrote an op-ed, about Mary Cain, entitled "I Was the Fastest Girl in America, Until I Joined Nike", that was critical of Nike, and its chief coach, Alberto Salazar. The article covered how Cain felt that bad coaching from Nike, which included forced weight loss, had ruined her competitive prospects, led her to develop brittle bones and amenorrhea, and caused her considerable mental distress. Crouse wrote that Gracie Gold, "the only other female athlete featured in the last Nike video ad Cain appeared in", also felt a similar pressure (from her training team) that triggered an eating disorder so profound that Gold considered taking her own life. Following the publication of the article Nike suspended Salazar.

In January 2020 she described being inspired by a new generation of female athletes, and deciding to begin training so she could compete for a spot on the USA Olympic team. She said she regarded Shalane Flanagan, the first American woman to win a NYC marathon in decades, in 2017, and Des Linden, who won the Boston Marathon in 2018, as her "team captains". Like Flanagan and Linden, Crouse made her renewed effort in her mid-thirties. She needed to run a marathon in under 2 hours and 45 minutes to make the team. Her best time was 2 hours and 53 minutes – better than her times in college, but short of making the team.

In February 2020 Crouse wrote a New York Times op-ed on her reaction to learning her ex-boyfriend, Michael Polansky, was Lady Gaga's new boyfriend. Marie Claire magazine quoted extensively from Crouse's op-ed, suggesting its readers could learn from her reaction.
