= The Queen of Basketball =

2021 documentary short film by Ben Proudfoot

- Poster
- Directed by: Ben Proudfoot
- Produced by: Shaquille O'Neal (executive producer); Stephen Curry (executive producer); Abby Davis; Gabe Godoi; Sarah Stewart; Elizabeth Brooke; Erick Peyton (executive producer); Brian Tetsuro Ivie; Mike Parris (executive producer); Donnie F. Wilson (executive producer); Adam Ellick (executive producer); Lindsay Crouse (commissioning producer)
- Starring: Lusia Harris
- Cinematography: Brandon Somerhalder
- Edited by: Stephanie Owens; Ben Proudfoot
- Music by: Nicholas Jacobsen-Larson
- Production company: Breakwater Studios
- Distributed by: The New York Times
- Release date: June 10, 2021 (Tribeca)
- Running time: 22 minutes
- Country: United States
- Language: English

The Queen of Basketball is a 2021 American documentary short film by Ben Proudfoot about basketball legend Lusia Harris. It premiered at the Tribeca Film Festival on June 10, 2021 and won the Academy Award for Best Documentary (Short Subject).

== Summary ==
Lusia Harris reflects on her time as a college basketball star, during which she and her team, Delta State University, won three national championships, and she won a silver medal with the United States women's national basketball team at the 1976 Summer Olympics. Her playing career ended after her graduation, as the WNBA would not be founded until 1996; she was offered the unique opportunity to try out for the New Orleans Jazz (later Utah Jazz) of the NBA, but turned it down, preferring to concentrate on raising a family. She would then return to Delta State University as head coach of their women's team.

== Accolades ==
Award	Date of ceremony	Category	Result	Ref.
Nashville Film Festival		Best Documentary Short	Nominated	
Palm Springs ShortFest		Best Documentary Short	Won	
Critics' Choice Documentary Awards	November 14, 2021	Best Short Documentary	Won	
Academy Awards	March 27, 2022	Best Documentary Short Subject	Won	
Peabody Awards	June 6–9, 2022	Documentary	Nominated	

== See also ==
- Dear Basketball
- Cheryl Miller
