= Asylum (2003 film) =

2003 film

- Film poster
- Directed by: Sandy McLeod
- Produced by: Gini Reticker
- Cinematography: Kirsten Johnson; Ellen Kuras
- Edited by: Kate Taverna
- Distributed by: Filmakers Library
- Release date: March 9, 2003 (South by Southwest)
- Running time: 20 minutes
- Country: United States
- Language: English

Asylum is a 2003 American short documentary film directed by Sandy McLeod. It was nominated for an Academy Award for Best Documentary Short.

== Overview ==
A young Ghanaian woman seeks refugee status in the U.S. when her father attempts to force her to marry against her will, and undergo female genital mutilation.
