= Dinner with Fred =

Dinner With Fred
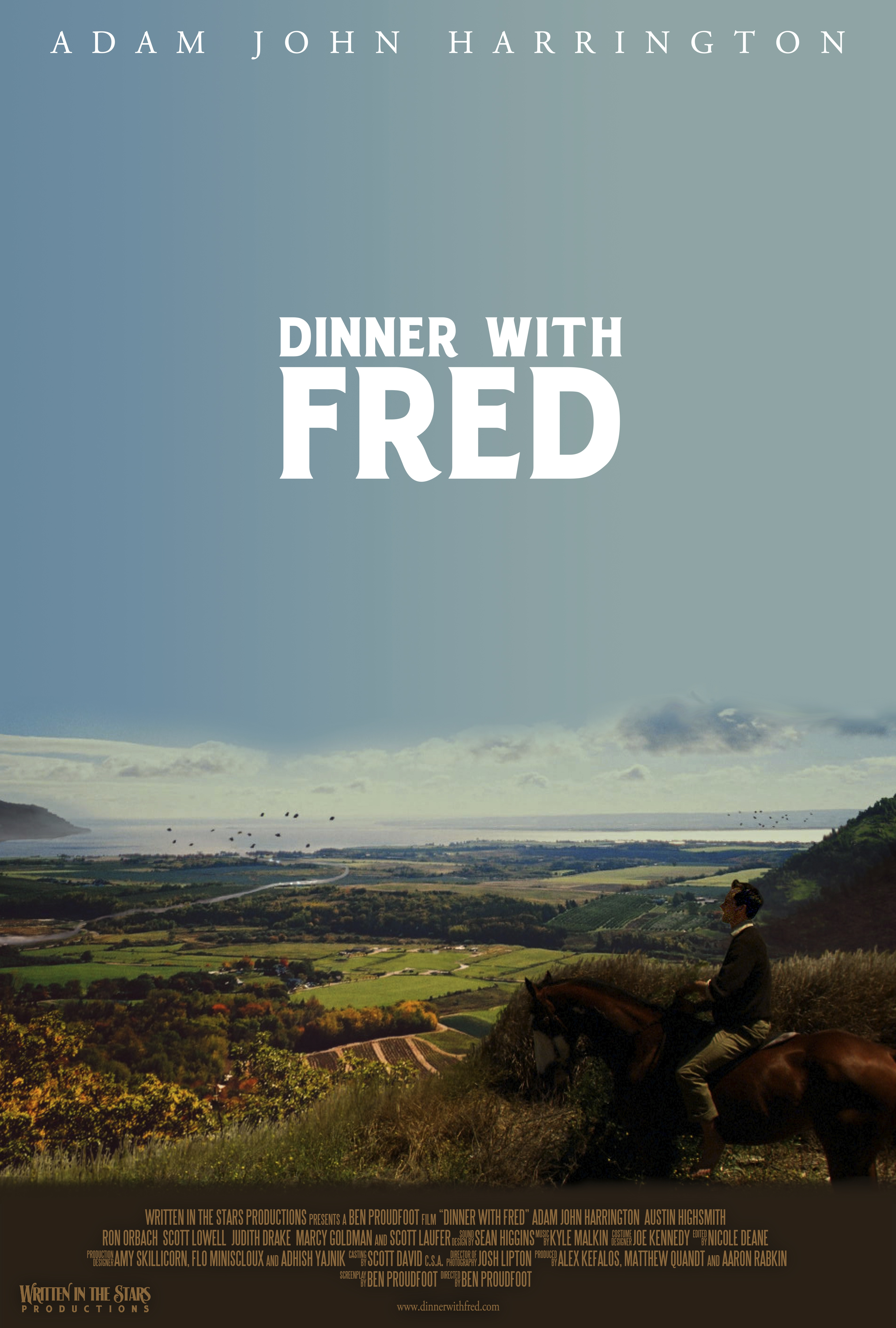
- Dinner with Fred
- Directed by: Ben Proudfoot
- Written by: Ben Proudfoot
- Produced by: Alex Kefalos; Matthew Quandt; Aaron Rabkin
- Starring: Adam John Harrington; Austin Highsmith; Scott Lowell; Ron Orbach; Judith Drake
- Cinematography: Josh Lipton
- Edited by: Nicole Deane
- Music by: Kyle Malkin
- Production company: Written in the Stars Productions
- Release date: January 24, 2011 (Los Angeles)
- Running time: 23 minutes
- Country: United States
- Language: English
- Budget: 50,000

Dinner With Fred is an American live action short film. The film's run time is approximately 23 minutes. It was written and directed by Ben Proudfoot and produced by Alex Kefalos, Matthew Quandt, and Aaron Rabkin. The film was shot on 35mm Kodak film stock using Panavision cameras by director of photography Josh Lipton.

== Outline ==
During World War II Fred Conrad (Adam John Harrington) was taken from a troop train in Europe and sent home to Canada to use his pre-war chicken raising skills to stop war-time food shortages. Fred and his wife Hilda (Austin Highsmith) turn a misfortunate change-of-plans into a career in humane poultry science that proves to hold meaning and purpose beyond Fred's wildest dreams. Supporting performances by Scott Lowell, Ron Orbach and Scott Laufer, the story shows what it means to serve one's country, even in unexpected ways.

== About ==
Dinner with Fred was created by a diverse group of more than a hundred individuals, ranging from first-time student filmmakers to seasoned Oscar-winners including (Kevin Haney, Driving Miss Daisy and Greg A. Watkins, Dances with Wolves); writer and director Ben Proudfoot, and produced by Alex Kefalos, Matthew Quandt and Aaron Rabkin.

The film was shot on 20,000 feet (6,100 m) of 35mm stock donated by Kodak and a complete camera package from Panavision. Casting director Scott David, C.S.A. assembled a cast of thirty professional actors including Adam Harrington and Austin Highsmith.

Produced independently, Dinner with Fred was shot in the summer of 2010 in Fillmore, Los Angeles, and Fort Bragg, California, where the cast and crew recreated 1944 Canada with an authentic period steam locomotive and dozens of costumed extras. One of the most thrilling moments of the production was when composer Kyle Malkin conducted his award-winning original score for an orchestra composed of John Williams’ players, thanks to music contractor Peter Rotter.

After premiering in Los Angeles in January 2011, Dinner with Fred began its successful nationwide festival run, garnering numerous awards and accolades. An independent short film of unprecedented scope, Dinner with Fred qualified for consideration for the 2011 Academy Awards in the Best Live Action Short Film category.

== Awards ==
- Best Short Film: Tulsa International Film Festival
- Best Director (Short Film): Tulsa International Film Festival
- Best Short Film: Flint Film Festival
- Best Picture: Southern California Business Film Festival
- Best Director: Southern California Business Film Festival
- Best Actor (Adam John Harrington): Southern California Business Film Festival
- Best Original Score: Van Wert Independent Film Festival
- Semi-Finalist: Angelus Student Film Festival
- Winner (Student Short): Redemptive Film Festival
- Official Selection: LA Shorts Fest
- Official Selection: The Rome International Film Festival
- Official Selection: Rumschpringe Short Film Festival
- Official Selection: Film Stories Student Film Festival
