= Rustin (soundtrack) =

Rustin (Soundtrack from the Netflix Film)

Soundtrack album by Branford Marsalis
- Released: November 3, 2023
- Recorded: 2023
- Genre: Film score
- Length: 50:19
- Label: Netflix Music
- Producer: Branford Marsalis

Branford Marsalis chronology
Ma Rainey's Black Bottom (2020)	Rustin (2023)

Singles from Rustin (Soundtrack from the Netflix Film)
- 1. "Show Me the Ideas" Released: October 13, 2023; 2. "The Knowing" Released: October 27, 2023; 3. "Road to Freedom" Released: November 2, 2023

Rustin (Soundtrack from the Netflix Film) is the soundtrack to the 2023 film of the same name directed by George C. Wolfe based on the life of civil rights activist Bayard Rustin and starred Colman Domingo as the eponymous character. The album consisted of 33 tracks, the majority of which were cues from the film score composed by Branford Marsalis, and the remaining four original songs. The album released on November 3, 2023 by Netflix Music. Three singles—"Show Me Your Ideas", "The Knowing" and "Road to Freedom"—accompanied the soundtrack.

== Development ==
The film marked Marsalis' second collaboration with Wolfe following The Immortal Life of Henrietta Lacks (2017) and Ma Rainey's Black Bottom (2020). Most of the music he had written for the film is inspired from his roots in the music he had listened to as well as the interests of Wolfe's own music interests as a fan of blues music and its variations—jazz, gospel, rhythm and blues. According to Marsalis, the music is kind of a traditional R&B writing to start with the bass, drums and followed with other instruments. However, he approached a "big band" style of jazz music with brass and woodwinds to effectively capture the emotions of the sequences and fluctuate between a single and collective sound, which speaks within the larger reality of Rustin's work within Civil Rights Movement.

The song "Show Me Your Ideas" was served as the byproduct of the scene that required, he "create a sound that delivered enthusiasm sonically". The inspiration derived from the works of jazz artists from Blue Note Records—Lee Morgan, Hank Mobley, Art Blakey, Herbie Hancock to name a few—helped him give a sonic template that he felt best fit the scene. Wolfe also instructed Marsalis in shaping the film's soundtrack, with decisions to feature one instrument more heavily than others or playing with the instrument versus a chorus of them, with Marsalis said that cues with singular instruments were written with a full rhythm section or orchestral accompaniment, and those were removed as Wolfe felt that those scenes were more effective with single instrument.

Lenny Kravitz penned and recorded the original song "Road to Freedom" for the film. On approaching Kravitz, Wolfe said that he gave a one note that needed him to deliver audiences from feeling to action. Suggesting the use of trombones after being fascinated by using it while filming Ma Rainey's Black Bottom, Wolfe brought in Trombone Shorty to contribute to the song.

== Track listing ==
No.	Title	Artist(s)	Length
1.	"Black Strength"		0:43
2.	"Who Said You're Not Our Man"		2:34
3.	"Pasadena"		1:40
4.	"Chief Wells Redux"		0:55
5.	"Bayard Bush Flashback"		1:17
6.	"Show Me Your Ideas"		3:57
7.	"Rustin Walks Home"		0:48
8.	"Makes You Want to Believe"		1:33
9.	"Bayard Breaks Down the Meeting"		0:46
10.	"I Ne'r Didst Dream"	Victor Ryan Robertson, Laudon C. Schuett	2:15
11.	"King to March"		0:24
12.	"Work As One, Move As One"		0:44
13.	"The Rustin Shuffle"		0:41
14.	"Dinner Music Cha-Cha"		2:19
15.	"Louis Reads the Pledge"		0:55
16.	"Bayard Cruising"		0:40
17.	"The Day Of, Part III"		0:31
18.	"How I Got Over"	Tonya Boyd-Cannon	4:33
19.	"Meeting at the Mall"		1:48
20.	"Fingertips Redux"		1:55
21.	"King to March, Version 2"		0:32
22.	"The Day Of, Part I"		1:25
23.	"The Day Of, Part II"		0:25
24.	"Moving to Utopia"		3:37
25.	"Elias' Song"		1:17
26.	"Press Conference"		1:06
27.	"Roy Has Issues with Me"		0:16
28.	"Heres Comes the People"		0:51
29.	"Bayard Breaks Down the Meeting, Version 1"		0:55
30.	"Bayard Goes to See Martin"		0:20
31.	"MLK Jr"		1:24
32.	"Didn't It Rain"	Boyd-Cannon	2:42
33.	"The Knowing"	Ledisi	4:31
Total length:			50:19

== Reception ==
Nick Schager of The Daily Beast, Barry Levitt of /Film and Linden Sheri of The Hollywood Reporter called the music as "scintillating", "kinetic" and "vibrant". Jonathan Romney of Financial Times wrote Marsalis' "bristling jazz score helps blow away some of the dramatic dust". Tomris Laffly of TheWrap called the score "at times, as great an asset to Rustin as [Colman] Domingo's performance". David Ehrlich of IndieWire wrote "Branford Marsalis’ jazz score maintains the buoyancy of a man who refused to be kept down".

== Accolades ==
Kravitz's original song "Road to Freedom" was poised to be in contention for Best Original Song category at the 96th Academy Awards, as well as Marsalis' score in the Best Original Score category.

Award	Date of Ceremony	Category	Recipient(s)	Result	Ref.
Hollywood Music in Media Awards	November 15, 2023	Best Original Score – Feature Film	Branford Marsalis	Nominated	
Hollywood Music in Media Awards	November 15, 2023	Best Original Song – Feature Film	Lenny Kravitz – ("Road to Freedom")	Nominated	
