= Ben Proudfoot =

Canadian director and filmmaker (born 1990)

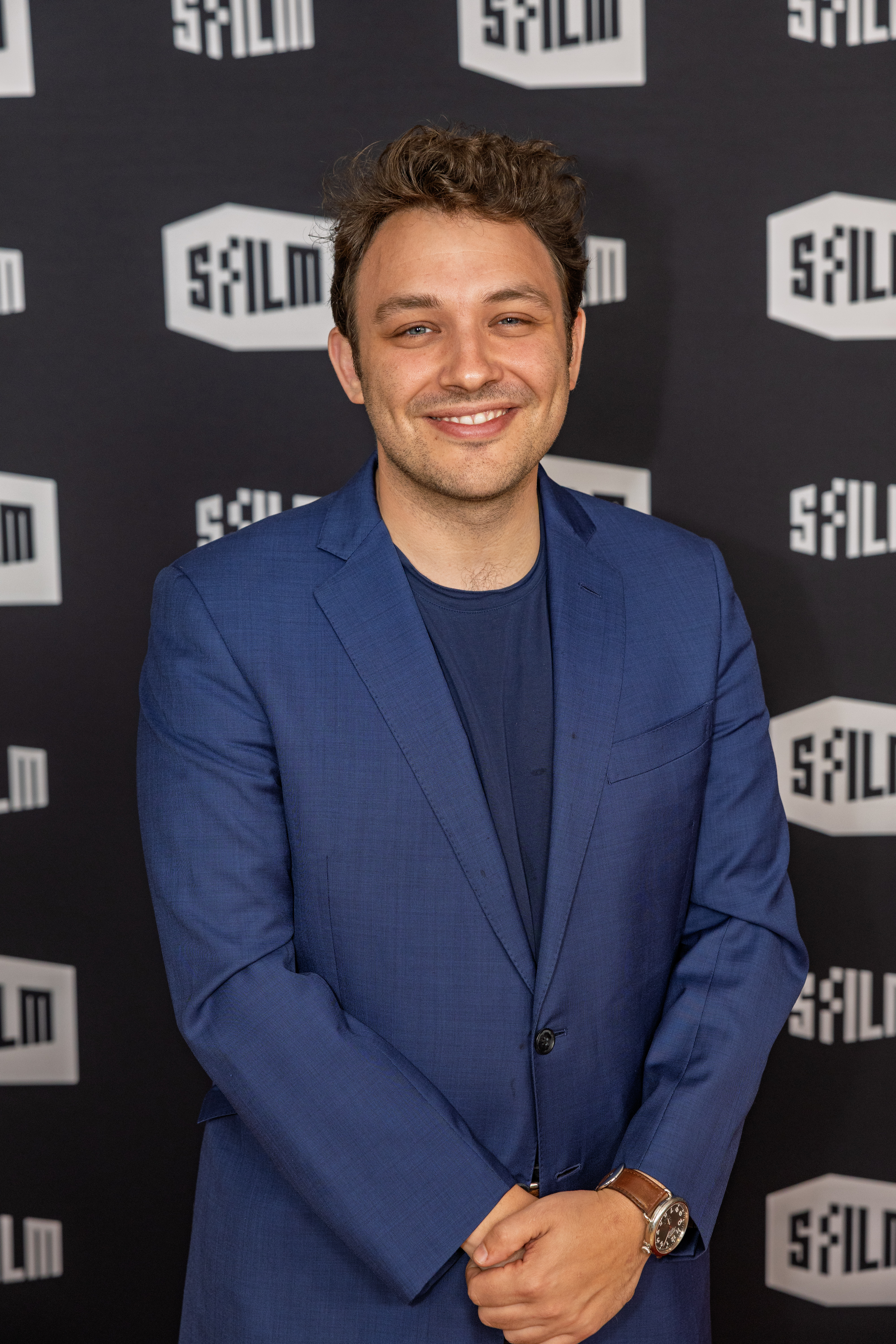
- Proudfoot at SFFILM in 2026
- Born: Benjamin Gordon VanderPlaat Proudfoot; October 29, 1990 (age 35); Halifax, Nova Scotia, Canada
- Occupations: Filmmaker, entrepreneur

Ben Proudfoot (born October 29, 1990) is a Canadian documentary filmmaker and entrepreneur. He has won two Academy Awards, the first ever awarded to The New York Times and the LA Times. Proudfoot is the founder and Chief Executive Officer of Breakwater Studios, a filmmaking company specializing in short documentaries.

== Early life ==
Born in Halifax, Nova Scotia, Proudfoot is of Scottish and Dutch heritage. His maternal grandmother was a member of the Dutch resistance. He was born to an attorney father and sociologist mother. As a teenager, he excelled as a sleight-of-hand magician, winning several Canadian and international titles in magic competitions and was the first international member of The Magic Castle Junior Program in Los Angeles.

Later, he moved to Los Angeles as an undeclared USC student and would eventually attend film school as a Critical Studies student at the USC School of Cinematic Arts. In 2011, he made his first short documentary for a class project, ink&paper, a nine-minute film about side-by-side letterpress and paper shops fighting to survive in Downtown LA. The film gained popularity on Vimeo and became a Vimeo Staff Pick.

== Career ==
In 2012, Proudfoot founded the production company Breakwater Studios focused on producing short documentaries. The company, named after the protective seawall Proudfoot and his father built on the south shore of Nova Scotia when he was 12, was opened in the same Los Feliz neighborhood building the original Disney Bros Studios was founded in 1923.

From 2011 to 2019, Proudfoot produced and directed a number of other films including live action short film Dinner with Fred, and short documentaries The Ox, Life's Work: Six Conversations with Makers and That's My Jazz which premiered at Tribeca Film Festival in 2019 and features Milton Abel Jr., the former head pastry chef of Michelin-star restaurant The French Laundry.

From 2019 to 2022, a watershed partnership between Breakwater Studios and The New York Times produced some sixteen films, including A Concerto is a Conversation, which was executive produced by Ava DuVernay and nominated for Best Documentary Short Subject at the 93rd Academy Awards, and The Queen of Basketball, which won the Oscar for Best Documentary Short Subject at the 94th Academy Awards. The film was executive produced by Shaquille O’Neal and Stephen Curry and made history as the first Oscar win for The New York Times. The film was one of eight films directed by Proudfoot as part of the Almost Famous anthology series profiling figures adjacent to history. The series was released on the New York Times website and YouTube as part of the Op-Docs slate.

Other notable films in the Almost Famous series include The Silent Pulse of the Universe, a film about astronomer Jocelyn Bell Burnell, whose instrumental role in the discovery of pulsars was not recognized when the Nobel Prize went to her professors Antony Hewish and Martin Ryle, and The First Report, which features Jason Berry, the Louisiana reporter who broke the Catholic Church sex abuse scandal in the 1980s before it gained traction. The Boston Globe covered the story in 2002, receiving a Pulitzer Prize and inspiring the Academy Award-winning feature film Spotlight. Kim I Am features Kim Hill, the original singer of the Black Eyed Peas who quit the band in 2000.The Lost Astronaut features Ed Dwight, the first would-be black American astronaut whose rise in NASA was thwarted due to alleged prejudice.

In 2020, Proudfoot produced a second series with The New York Times titled Cause of Life. The series celebrates the lives of five people lost to COVID-19, and was nominated for an Emmy Award at the 42nd News and Documentary Emmy Awards.

In 2022, Proudfoot directed and produced two more films released by The New York Times. MINK! tells the story of Patsy Takemoto Mink, the first woman of color elected to the U.S. Congress and who helped author the pivotal Title IX law prohibiting sex-based discrimination in education. The film was executive produced by Naomi Osaka and was nominated for Outstanding Short Documentary at the 44th News and Documentary Emmy Awards. Also released in 2022, The Best Chef in the World told the story of Sally Schmidt, the original owner and cook of The French Laundry before it became the Michelin-star restaurant run by celebrity chef Thomas Keller.

On March 10, 2024, Proudfoot became the first person born in the 1990s to win a second Academy Award, this time for The Last Repair Shop, his second collaboration with composer and filmmaker Kris Bowers and the first Oscar for The Los Angeles Times. The film was distributed by Searchlight Pictures, an arm of The Walt Disney Company.

In 2024, ESPN Films partnered to release Breakwater’s short documentary film Motorcycle Mary that features Mary McGee, the first woman to race motorcycles in U.S. history. The film was directed by Haley Watson and produced by Rachel Greenwald while Proudfoot and seven-time Formula One world champion Lewis Hamilton served as executive producers.

In 2024, Netflix acquired The Turnaround, Breakwater’s short documentary about Jon McCann, a devoted Philadelphia Phillies fan who helped spark a standing ovation for struggling shortstop Trea Turner. The film was directed by Kyle Thrash. Proudfoot served as co-director and producer. The film was produced in partnership with Major League Baseball, Dick’s Sporting Goods’ Cookie Jar and A Dream Studios, and Barack and Michelle Obama-led Higher Ground Media.

The Final Copy of Ilon Specht, produced and directed by Proudfoot, won the Grand Prix in the Film category at the 2025 Cannes Lions International Festival of Creativity. The film is a cinematic tribute to the woman behind one of advertising's most enduring taglines, L'Oréal's ″Because I’m worth it,″ and was created as a collaboration between global creative agency network McCann, Proudfoot's Breakwater Studios, and production company Traverse 32 for L'Oréal Paris. In addition to the Grand Prix, the film earned four other awards at the 2025 Cannes Lions: Gold for Entertainment, Silver for Entertainment and PR, and a Bronze for Film Craft.

In 2025, Proudfoot's The Eyes of Ghana world premiered at the 2025 Toronto International Film Festival. Executive produced by Barack and Michelle Obama, the documentary feature film spotlights Chris Tsui Hesse, the 93-year-old forgotten personal cinematographer of revolutionary African leader Kwame Nkrumah.

== Accolades ==
In 2020, Proudfoot was named one of Forbes Magazine’s 30 Under 30 for his leadership and innovation in the documentary space.

In 2023, Proudfoot was awarded the Queen Elizabeth II's Platinum Jubilee Medal by the government of Nova Scotia.

Ceremony	Year	Category	Nominated Work	Result	Ref
Academy Awards	2024	Best Documentary Short Film	The Last Repair Shop	Won	
Academy Awards	2022	Best Documentary Short Film	The Queen of Basketball	Won	
Academy Awards	2021	Best Documentary Short Film	A Concerto Is a Conversation	Nominated	
Critics Choice Documentary Awards	2024	Best Short Documentary	The Turnaround	Nominated	
Critics Choice Documentary Awards	2023	Best Short Documentary	The Last Repair Shop	Won	
Critics Choice Documentary Awards	2023	Best Score	The Last Repair Shop	Nominated	
Critics Choice Documentary Awards	2021	Best Short Documentary	The Queen of Basketball	Won	
News and Documentary Emmy Awards	2023	Outstanding Short Documentary	MINK!	Nominated	
News and Documentary Emmy Awards	2021	Outstanding Arts, Culture or Entertainment Coverage	Cause of Life	Nominated	
News and Documentary Emmy Awards	2020	Outstanding New Approaches: Arts, Lifestyle and Culture	Almost Famous	Nominated	
Los Angeles Area Emmy Awards	2018	Best Independent Programming	Montage: Great Film Composers and the Piano	Won	
Cannes Lions International Festival of Creativity	2025	Grand Prix - Film	The Final Copy of Ilon Specht	Won	
James Beard Media Awards	2020	Best Documentary	That’s My Jazz	Won	
Peabody Awards	2022	Documentary	The Queen of Basketball	Nominated	
IDA Awards	2020	Best Short Form Series	Almost Famous	Won	
IDA Awards	2020	Best Short	The Lost Astronaut	Nominated	
Sedona International Film Festival	2024	Directors’ Choice Award - Most Inspirational Documentary Short	The Last Repair Shop	Won	
Hot Springs Documentary Film Festival	2024	Matt Decample Audience Choice Award - Best Short	The Last Repair Shop	Won	
Middleburg Film Festival	2023	Special Presentation Audience Award	The Last Repair Shop	Won	
Calgary International Film Festival	2023	Grand Jury Prize - Best Documentary Short Film	The Last Repair Shop	Won	
Coronado Island Film Festival	2024	Jury Award - Best Short Documentary	The Last Repair Shop	Won	
Coronado Island Film Festival	2020	Audience Award - Documentary Short	The Other Fab Four	Won	
Astra Film and Creative Awards	2024	Best Short Film	The Last Repair Shop	Nominated	
Black Reel Awards	2024	Outstanding Independent Short Film	The Last Repair Shop	Nominated	
Palm Springs International ShortFest	2021	Best Documentary	The Queen of Basketball	Won	
Sulmona International Film Festival	2021	Best Documentary	The Queen of Basketball	Won	
Sulmona International Film Festival	2021	Best Editing	The Queen of Basketball	Won	
San Francisco International Film Festival	2021	Golden Gate Award for Family Film - Special Jury Mention	A Concerto Is a Conversation	Won	
Woods Hole Film Festival	2021	Jury Award - Best Documentary Short	A Concerto Is a Conversation	Won	
Woods Hole Film Festival	2021	Audience Award - Best Documentary Short	A Concerto Is a Conversation	Won	
Cordillera International Film Festival	2021	Special Jury Award - John Singleton Impact Award	A Concerto Is a Conversation	Won	
Cleveland International Film Festival	2021	Best Black Cinema Short	A Concerto Is a Conversation	Won	
Frozen River Film Festival	2020	Best Documentary	That’s My Jazz	Won	
Indy Shorts International Film Festival	2021	Jenni Berebitsky Legacy Award	A Concerto Is a Conversation	Won	
Indy Shorts International Film Festival	2023	Pioneering Spirit Award	Self	Won	
Windrider Summit Sundance	2022	Spirit of Windrider	Self	Won	
Sundance Film Festival	2026	Short Film Grand Jury Prize at Sundance	The Baddest Speechwriter of All	Won	

== Filmography ==
=== Feature films ===
Year	Title	Director	Producer	Executive Producer
2016	Rwanda & Juliet	Yes	Yes	No
2025	The Eyes of Ghana	Yes	Yes	No

=== Short films ===
Year	Title	Director	Producer	Executive Producer
2011	Dinner With Fred	Yes	No	No
2012	ink&paper	Yes	Yes	No
2013	The Ox	Yes	Yes	No
2015	Stone	Yes	Yes	No
2015	Ladybug	Yes	Yes	No
2015	Fibre & Wood	Yes	Yes	No
2015	Rust	Yes	Yes	No
2015	Mother Earth	Yes	Yes	No
2016	Montage: Great Film Composers and the Piano	No	No	Yes
2017	Kunstglaser	Yes	Yes	No
2017	A Love Letter to Lisbon	Yes	Yes	No
2018	Still Here	Yes	Yes	No
2018	George	Yes	Yes	No
2019	That’s My Jazz	Yes	Yes	No
2019	The King of Fish and Chips	Yes	Yes	No
2019	Kim I Am	Yes	Yes	No
2019	The Other Fab Four	Yes	Yes	No
2019	The Lost Astronaut	Yes	Yes	No
2020	A Concerto Is a Conversation	Yes	Yes	No
2020	The Last Supper	No	No	Yes
2021	The Silent Pulse of the Universe	Yes	Yes	No
2021	The First Report	Yes	Yes	No
2021	The Unchosen One	Yes	Yes	No
2021	The Beauty President	No	No	Yes
2021	The Queen of Basketball	Yes	Yes	No
2022	MINK!	Yes	Yes	No
2022	The Best Chef in the World	Yes	Yes	No
2023	The Last Repair Shop	Yes	Yes	Yes
2024	Motorcycle Mary	No	No	Yes
2024	The Turnaround	Yes	Yes	No
2024	The Final Copy of Ilon Specht	Yes	Yes	No
2026	The Baddest Speechwriter of All	Yes	Yes	No

=== Docuseries ===
Year	Title	Director	Producer	Executive Producer
2015	Life’s Work: Six Conversations with Makers	Yes	Yes	No
2019	Op-Docs: Almost Famous	Yes	Yes	No
2020	Op-Docs: Cause of Life	Yes	Yes	No
