= A Concerto Is a Conversation =

2021 film by Ben Proudfoot and Kris Bowers

- Directed by: Ben Proudfoot; Kris Bowers
- Produced by: Ben Proudfoot; Jeremy Lambert; Kris Bowers
- Starring: Kris Bowers; Horace Bowers Sr.
- Cinematography: David Bolen; Brandon Somerhalder
- Edited by: Lukas Dong
- Music by: Kris Bowers
- Production company: Breakwater Studios
- Distributed by: The New York Times
- Release date: January 28, 2021 (Sundance)
- Running time: 13 minutes
- Country: United States
- Language: English

A Concerto Is a Conversation is a 2021 American short documentary film directed by Ben Proudfoot and Kris Bowers.

== Summary ==
The 13-minute film centers on Bowers's conversations with his 92-year-old entrepreneur grandfather, Horace Sr., about personal and family history.

== Production ==
Filmmaker Ava DuVernay is an executive producer on this film.

== Accolades ==
The film won the Audience Award for Short Films at the 2021 Hot Docs Canadian International Documentary Festival.

It was nominated for Best Documentary Short Subject at the 93rd Academy Awards.

== See also ==
- Jim Crow
- Walt Disney Concert Hall
