= Sandy McLeod =

American filmmaker

Sandy McLeod is an independent filmmaker. She is a member of the Directors Guild of America and has been nominated for an Academy Award.

== Career ==
Born in Pontiac, Michigan, she was raised in Alabama. In her late teens, she moved to New York City and eventually began her filmmaking career. She learned her craft by doing continuity for over 15 years on feature films and working with directors as diverse as Gerald Diamiano, Richard Attenborough, Karel Reisz, Paul Schrader, Jonathan Demme, and Taylor Hackford.

While working behind the camera, as a script supervisor, she also acted in Demme's film Last Embrace. This was the beginning of a brief acting career. She played the lead role in the independently produced film noir Variety, which was invited to the Director’s Fortnight at the Cannes Film Festival in 1984. She later had roles in Melvin and Howard, Tootsie, Something Wild, and City of Hope.

For a short stretch of time, McLeod worked as a production designer on a series of projects that included PBS’s Trying Times written by Beth Henley, and directed by Jonathan Demme, starring Rosanna Arquette. She also worked on Mountainview, a dance film directed by John Sayles and choreographed by Marta Renzi for “Alive From Off Center”. She collaborated with Demme as the production designer on Swimming to Cambodia.

She teamed up with Jordan Cronenweth and Jonathan Demme as a visual consultant to establish the innovative textural elements for the landmark film Stop Making Sense. She also worked with Demme as an associate producer on a documentary for Channel 4 titled Haiti: Dreams of Democracy. McLeod also contributed as the second unit director to John Sayles's Limbo and Silver City.

Her next film was Doll Day Afternoon, a short she directed for Saturday Night Live. McLeod conceptualized, produced, and directed several Talking Heads music videos. “Nothing but Flowers” was featured at the New York Film Festival. She produced, directed, and co-wrote segments of an AIDS awareness project aired by CBS titled Red Hot + Blue.

McLeod directed the Academy Award-nominated short documentary Asylum, about a Ghanaian woman who sought political asylum in the United States to escape female genital mutilation in her home country. The film won a Gracie, and was nominated for an Emmy in 2006.

Her first feature-length documentary Seeds of Time premiered at South by Southwest Film Festival and has played in numerous film festivals all over the world. Seeds of Time traces the story of Cary Fowler and his single-handed effort to successfully establish the Svalbard Seed Bank that is now the repository of seed samples from around the world. The film stresses the importance of agricultural diversity, especially given the dire implications of climate change. It won several awards, including the Audience Award at the San Francisco Green Film Festival, Best Film at the Portland Eco Film Festival, and Best Cinematography at Costa Rica International Film Festival. The film aired on PBS.

== Filmography (selection) ==
=== Director ===
- 2013: Seeds of Time (feature-length documentary)
- 2003: Asylum (documentary short)
- 1998: John Szarkowski: A Life in Photography (feature-length documentary)

=== Producer ===
- 1998: John Szarkowski: A Life in Photography (feature-length documentary)
- 1988: Haiti: Dreams of Democracy (documentary with Jonathan Demme)

=== Acting ===
- 1991: City of Hope
- 1986: Something Wild
- 1984: Swing Shift
- 1983: Variety
- 1982: Tootsie
- 1980: Melvin and Howard
- 1979: Last Embrace
- 1978: Rockers
