= Middleburg Film Festival =

Annual film festival held in Middleburg, Virginia, United States

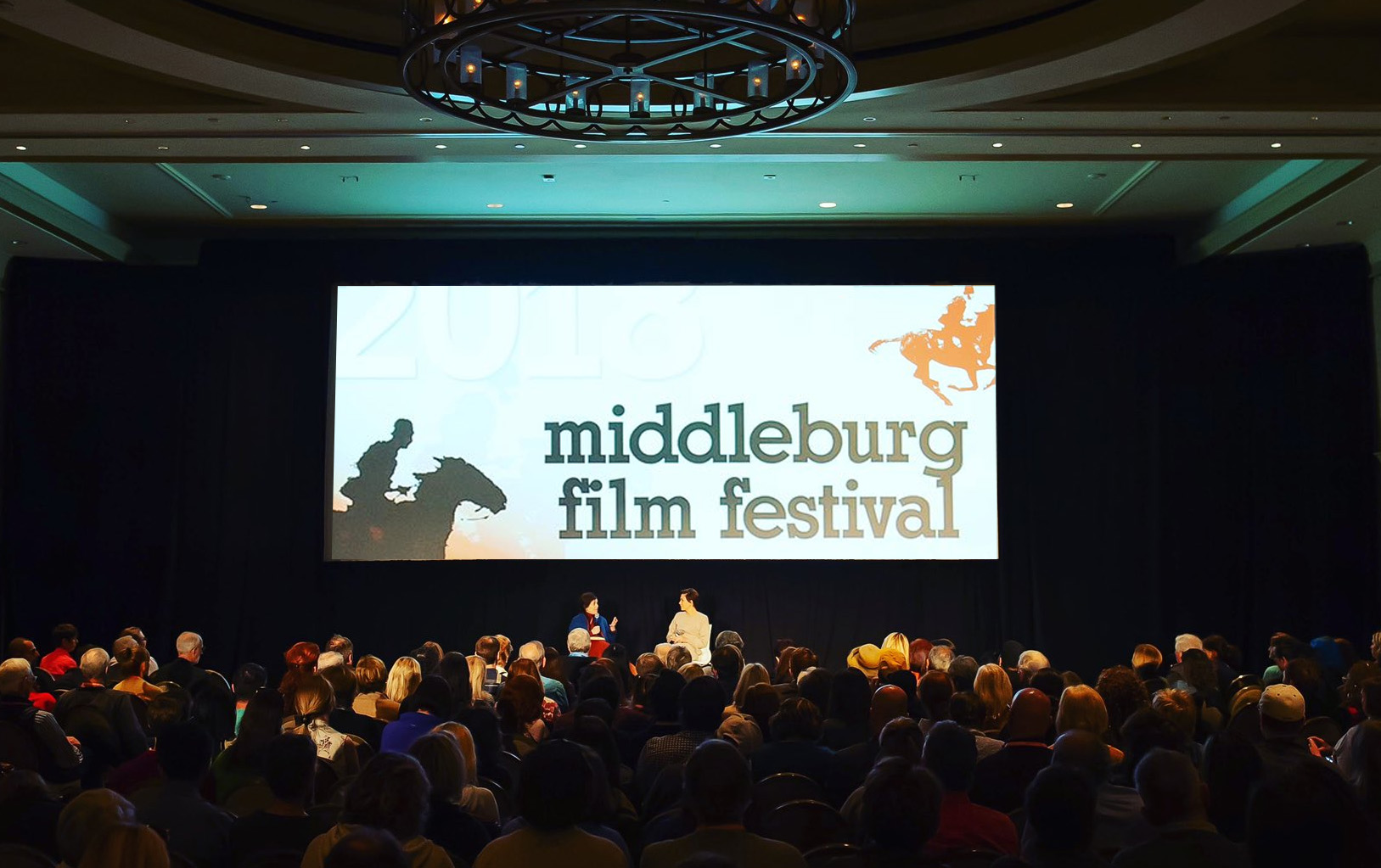
- Location: Middleburg, Virginia, United States
- Founded: 2013
- Website: middleburgfilm.org

The Middleburg Film Festival (MFF) is a film festival held annually in Middleburg, Virginia, in October.

== History ==
First held in October 2013, the festival, hosted in the town of Middleburg, Virginia was founded by Sheila Johnson and filmmaker Susan Koch. Board members and advisory committee chairs include Albert Berger, Ron Yerxa, Matt Carson, Kris Bowers, & Nicholas Britell.

As the small town of Middleburg (population 650) has no movie theater, audiences screen films at the Salamander Resort ballroom as well as a nearby school, community center, and the National Sporting Library & Museum. The festival attracts approximately 5,000 attendees each year.

== Program ==
The program consists of new films along with speakers including filmmakers, actors, screenwriters, and composers. The typical slate includes around forty films. Each year the festival produces a concert and awards its Distinguished Composer Award, with previous winners including Terence Blanchard, Carter Burwell, Mark Isham, & Michael Abels.

Previous guests and speakers have included Brendan Fraser, Maggie Gyllenhaal, Aldis Hodge, Emma Stone, Viggo Mortensen, Lee Daniels, Dakota Johnson, Meg Ryan, Kenneth Branagh, Greta Gerwig, and Ray Romano.

== Reception ==
Adam Rathe of Town & Country Magazine wrote: "the Middleburg Film Festival, held in mid-October in a leafy corner of Virginia horse country, might not be as large a presence as some others, but increasingly the four-day festival has become one of the most interesting (and influential) on the road winding toward the Academy Awards."

"In just 10 years, the Middleburg Film Festival managed to cement itself as “a must” on the path to the Academy Awards. This year alone, Rian Johnson (Glass Onion: A Knives Out Mystery), Stephanie Hsu (Everything Everywhere All At Once), Noah Baumbach (White Noise), Brendan Fraser (The Whale), Gina Prince-Bythewood (The Woman King), and more were in attendance to support their films and receive tributes." - Clarence Moye, Awards Daily

"For the last seven years, audiences have flocked to the Middleburg Film Festival. Running October 17th – 21st, and situated in the wine-country hills of historic Middleburg, Virg., the festival usually highlights some of the year’s buzziest titles." - Nick Clement, Variety
