= Oratory School =

An Oratory School is any of several schools founded or initially operated by the Oratorians (priests of the Oratory of Saint Philip Neri), a congregation of Catholic priests. These include:

- The Oratory School, Woodcote, Oxfordshire
- The Oratory Preparatory School, Pangbourne, Oxfordshire
- The London Oratory School
- Oratory Preparatory School, Summit, New Jersey
