= 55th NAACP Image Awards =

American entertainment awards for 2023

- Date: March 16, 2024
- Site: Shrine Auditorium, Los Angeles, California
- Hosted by: Queen Latifah
- Official website: NAACPImageAwards.net

Highlights
- Best Picture: The Color Purple
- Best Drama Series: Queen Charlotte: A Bridgerton Story
- Best Musical or Comedy Series: Abbott Elementary
- Most nominations: The Color Purple: 16 Nominations

Television coverage
- Network: BET; CBS; BET Her; MTV; MTV2; CMT; Comedy Central; Logo TV; Paramount Network; Smithsonian Channel; TV Land; VH1 (simulcast)

The 55th NAACP Image Awards, presented by the NAACP, honored outstanding representations and achievements of people of color in motion pictures, television, music, and literature during the year 2023. The ceremony was hosted by Queen Latifah and aired on March 16, 2024, on BET and simulcasted on CBS. Non-televised Image Awards categories were livestreamed March 11 to 14, on the Image Awards website.

Submissions were received online from July 31 to November 3, 2023, and public online voting on the shortlisted nominations for performance categories ran from January 25 to February 24, 2024, on the Image Awards website.

The nominations were announced on January 25, 2024, with the film The Color Purple and actor Colman Domingo leading the motion picture categories with 16 and three nominations, respectively, and Ayo Edebiri leading the nominations for television and streaming categories with two for Abbott Elementary and The Bear. In the recording categories, Victoria Monét and Usher led the nominations with six and five nominations, respectively. RCA Records collectively led the nominations in the recording categories with 20 nominations, while HarperCollins Publishers and Penguin Random House led the literary categories with seven and four nominations, respectively.

Poet, writer and activist Amanda Gorman was honored with the Chairman's Award. Creative director and costume designer June Ambrose received the Vanguard Award at the award ceremony's NAACP Fashion Show on March 15, 2024.

The film The Color Purple became the most nominated and most awarded motion picture in the ceremony's history at the time, receiving 16 nominations and winning eleven. It broke the record previously held by The Best Man (1999), Black Panther (2018) and Jingle Jangle: A Christmas Journey (2020), which were all tied with ten nominations. This record would be broken two years later by Sinners (2025), when it received 18 nominations and won 13 awards, respectively.

== Category changes ==
Eight new categories were created:

- Outstanding Youth Performance in a Motion Picture
- Outstanding Cinematography in a Motion Picture
- Outstanding Short Form Documentary Motion Picture
- Outstanding Original Score for TV/Film
- Outstanding Scripted Series Podcast
- Outstanding Limited Series/Short Form Podcast
- Outstanding Graphic Novel
- Outstanding Stunt Ensemble

== Winners and nominees ==
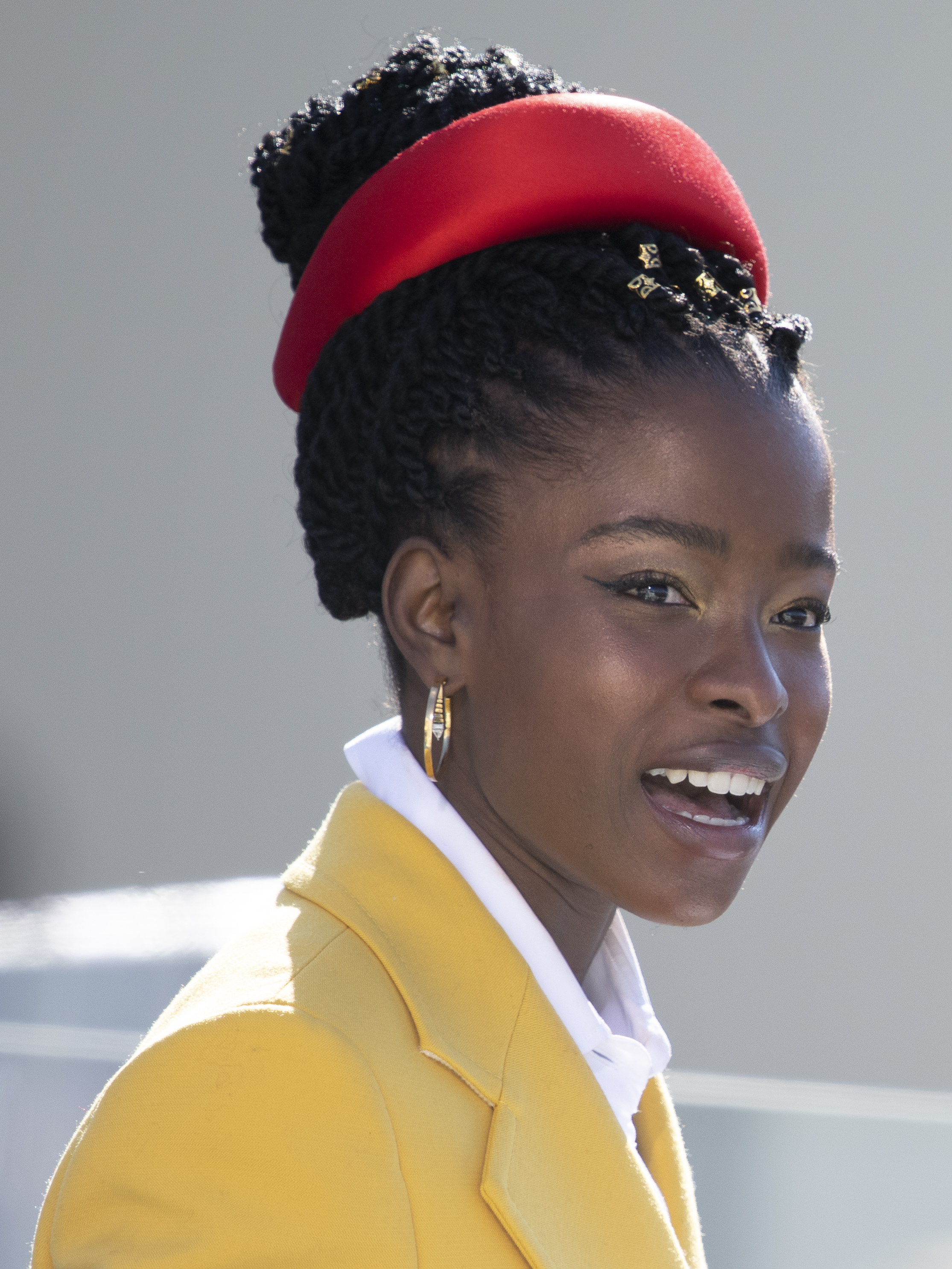
Amanda Gorman was honored with the Chairman's Award.

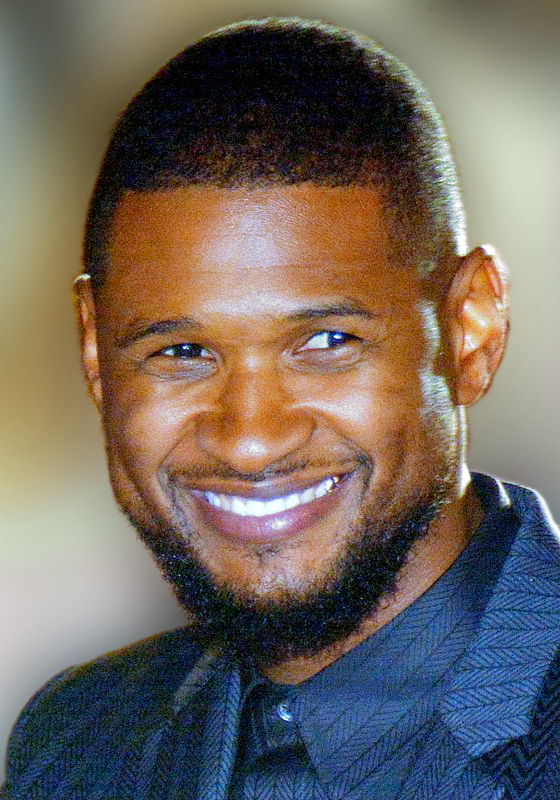
Usher received the President's Award and the Entertainer of the Year.

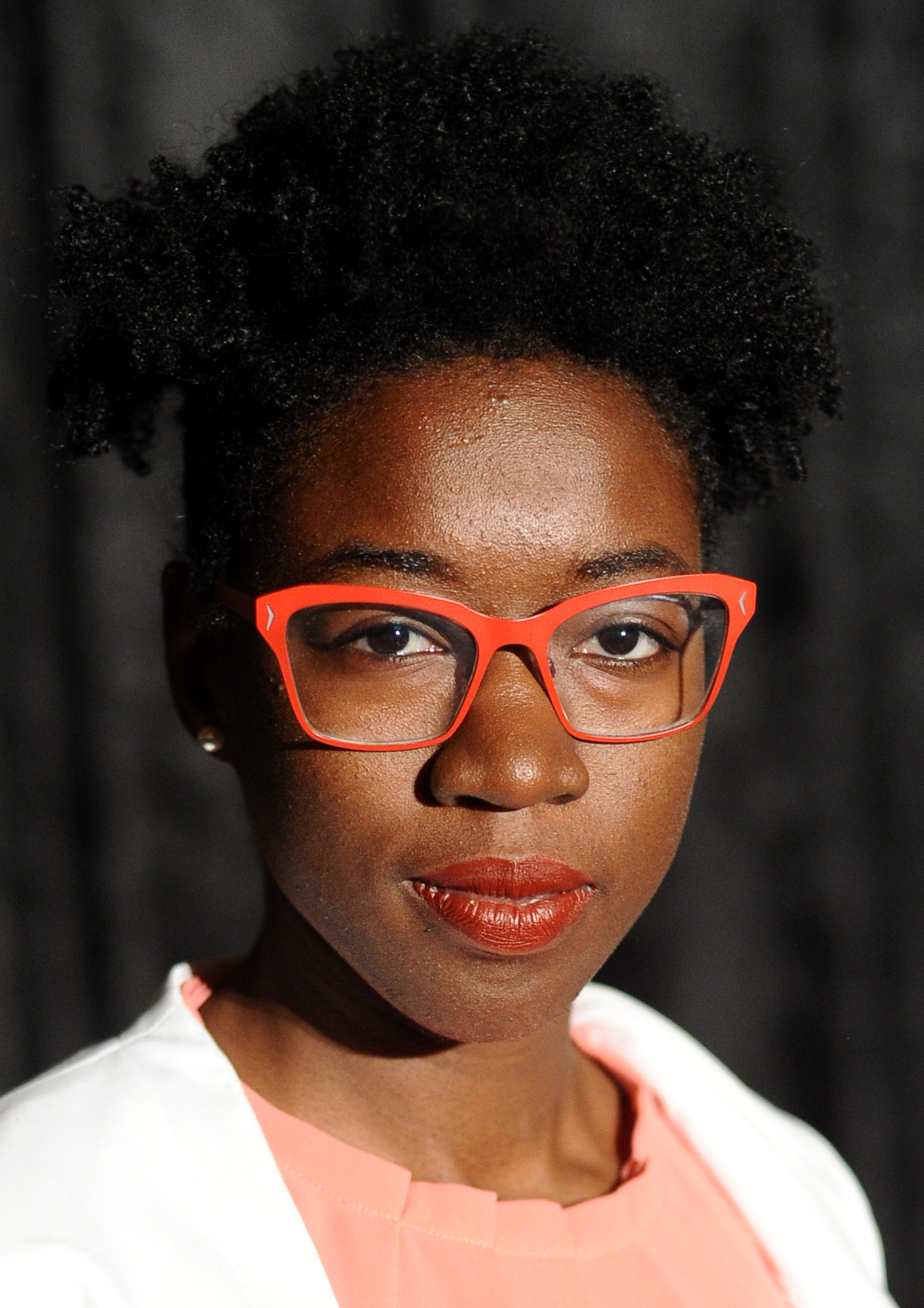
Joy Buolamwini was honored with the Digital Civil Rights Award.

All nominees are listed below, and the winners are listed in bold.

=== Special awards ===
President's Award
- **Usher**
Chairman's Award
- **Amanda Gorman**
Vanguard Award
- **June Ambrose**
Entertainer of the Year
- **Usher**
  - Colman Domingo
  - Fantasia Barrino
  - Halle Bailey
  - Keke Palmer
NAACP-Archewell Digital Civil Rights Award
- **Joy Buolamwini**

=== Motion Picture ===
Outstanding Motion Picture	Outstanding Directing in a Motion Picture
**The Color Purple**; American Fiction; Origin; Rustin; They Cloned Tyrone	**Ava DuVernay – Origin**; Antoine Fuqua – The Equalizer 3; George C. Wolfe – Rustin; Juel Taylor – They Cloned Tyrone; Michael B. Jordan – Creed III
Outstanding Actor in a Motion Picture	Outstanding Actress in a Motion Picture
**Colman Domingo – Rustin**; Denzel Washington – The Equalizer 3; Jamie Foxx – The Burial; Jeffrey Wright – American Fiction; John Boyega – They Cloned Tyrone	**Fantasia Barrino – The Color Purple**; Aunjanue Ellis–Taylor – Origin; Halle Bailey – The Little Mermaid; Teyana Taylor – A Thousand and One; Yara Shahidi – Sitting in Bars with Cake
Outstanding Supporting Actor in a Motion Picture	Outstanding Supporting Actress in a Motion Picture
**Colman Domingo – The Color Purple**; Corey Hawkins – The Color Purple; Glynn Turman – Rustin; Jamie Foxx – They Cloned Tyrone; Sterling K. Brown – American Fiction	**Taraji P. Henson – The Color Purple**; Danielle Brooks – The Color Purple; Da'Vine Joy Randolph – The Holdovers; Erika Alexander – American Fiction; Halle Bailey – The Color Purple
Outstanding International Motion Picture	Outstanding Independent Motion Picture
**Brother**; Anatomy of a Fall; Mami Wata; Rye Lane; Society of the Snow	**Brother**; Back on the Strip; Story Ave; Sweetwater; The Angry Black Girl and Her Monster
Outstanding Breakthrough Performance in a Motion Picture	Outstanding Ensemble Cast in a Motion Picture
**Phylicia Pearl Mpasi – The Color Purple**; Aaron Pierre – Brother; Laya DeLeon Hayes – The Angry Black Girl and Her Monster; Mila Davis–Kent – Creed III; Teyana Taylor – A Thousand and One	**The Color Purple**; American Fiction; Rustin; The Blackening; They Cloned Tyrone
Outstanding Animated Motion Picture	Outstanding Character Voice Performance – Motion Picture
**Spider-Man: Across the Spider-Verse**; Elemental; Lil' Ruby; Teenage Mutant Ninja Turtles: Mutant Mayhem; Wish	**Issa Rae – Spider-Man: Across the Spider-Verse**; Ariana DeBose – Wish; Brian Tyree Henry – Spider-Man: Across the Spider-Verse; Daniel Kaluuya – Spider-Man: Across the Spider-Verse; Shameik Moore – Spider-Man: Across the Spider-Verse
Outstanding Short Form (Live Action)	Outstanding Short Form (Animated)
**The After**; Flower; Gaps; Lucille; Rocky Road on Channel Three	**Lil' Ruby**; Blueberry; Bridges; Burning Rubber; Ego' Curse
Outstanding Breakthrough Creative (Motion Picture)	Outstanding Writing in a Motion Picture
**Blitz Bazawule – The Color Purple**; A.V. Rockwell – A Thousand and One; Choice Skinner – A New Life; Dewayne Perkins – The Blackening; Juel Taylor – They Cloned Tyrone	**Cord Jefferson – American Fiction**; A.V. Rockwell – A Thousand and One; Juel Taylor, Tony Rettenmaier – They Cloned Tyrone; Maggie Betts, Doug Wright – The Burial; Marcus Gardley – The Color Purple
Outstanding Youth Performance in a Motion Picture	Outstanding Cinematography in a Feature Film
**Mila Davis–Kent – Creed III**; Aaron Kingsley Adetola – A Thousand and One; Aven Courtnery – A Thousand and One; Calah Lane – Wonka; Lennox Simms – Origin	**Eric K. Yue – A Thousand and One**; C. Kim Miles, Julia Liu, Clair Popkin – Still: A Michael J. Fox Movie; Guy Godfree – Brother; Ken Seng – They Cloned Tyrone; Paul Yee – Joy Ride

=== Television ===
==== Drama ====
Outstanding Drama Series
**Queen Charlotte: A Bridgerton Story**; Bel-Air; Black Cake; Found; Snowfall
Outstanding Actor in a Drama Series	Outstanding Actress in a Drama Series
**Damson Idris – Snowfall**; Forest Whitaker – Godfather of Harlem; Idris Elba – Hijack; Jabari Banks – Bel–Air; Jesse L. Martin – The Irrational	**India Amarteifio – Queen Charlotte: A Bridgerton Story**; Angela Bassett – 9-1-1; Octavia Spencer – Truth Be Told; Queen Latifah – The Equalizer; Zoe Saldaña – Special Ops: Lioness
Outstanding Supporting Actor in a Drama Series	Outstanding Supporting Actress in a Drama Series
**Adrian Holmes – Bel–Air**; Amin Joseph – Snowfall; Giancarlo Esposito – Godfather of Harlem; LaRoyce Hawkins – Chicago P.D.; Wendell Pierce – Tom Clancy's Jack Ryan	**Gail Bean – Snowfall**; Adjoa Andoh – Queen Charlotte: A Bridgerton Story; Arsema Thomas – Queen Charlotte: A Bridgerton Story; Golda Rosheuvel – Queen Charlotte: A Bridgerton Story; Nicole Beharie – The Morning Show
Outstanding Directing in a Drama Series	Outstanding Writing in a Dramatic Series
**Dawn Wilkinson – Power Book II: Ghost**; Alonso Alvarez–Barreda – Snowfall; Amin Joseph – Snowfall; Carl Seaton – Godfather of Harlem; Geary McLeod – Power Book II: Ghost	**Carla Banks-Waddles – Bel–Air**; Lee Sung Jin – Beef; Marissa Jo Cerar – Black Cake; Nkechi Okoro Carroll – Found; Shonda Rhimes – Queen Charlotte: A Bridgerton Story

==== Comedy ====
Outstanding Comedy Series
**Abbott Elementary**; Harlem; Survival of the Thickest; The Neighborhood; UnPrisoned
Outstanding Actor in a Comedy Series	Outstanding Actress in a Comedy Series
**Mike Epps – The Upshaws**; Cedric The Entertainer – The Neighborhood; Delroy Lindo – UnPrisoned; Dulé Hill – The Wonder Years; Tone Bell – Survival of the Thickest	**Quinta Brunson – Abbott Elementary**; Kerry Washington – UnPrisoned; Meagan Good – Harlem; Michelle Buteau – Survival of the Thickest; Tichina Arnold – The Neighborhood
Outstanding Supporting Actor in a Comedy Series	Outstanding Supporting Actress in a Comedy Series
**William Stanford Davis – Abbott Elementary**; Kenan Thompson – Saturday Night Live; Roy Wood Jr. – The Daily Show; Tyler Lepley – Harlem; Tyler James Williams – Abbott Elementary	**Ayo Edebiri – The Bear**; Ego Nwodim – Saturday Night Live; Janelle James – Abbott Elementary; Sheryl Lee Ralph – Abbott Elementary; Shoniqua Shandai – Harlem
Outstanding Directing in a Comedy Series	Outstanding Writing in a Comedy Series
**Neema Barnette – Grand Crew**; Amy Aniobi – Survival of the Thickest; Donald Glover – Swarm; Numa Perrier – UnPrisoned; Robbie Countryman – The Upshaws	**Norman Vance Jr. – Saturdays**; Ava Coleman – Abbott Elementary; Brittani Nichols – Abbott Elementary; Donald Glover, Janine Nabers – Swarm; Michelle Buteau – Survival of the Thickest

==== Television Movie, Limited-Series or Dramatic Special ====
Outstanding Television Movie, Mini-Series or Dramatic Special
**Swarm**; Black Girl Missing; First Lady of BMF: The Tonesa Welch Story; Heist 88; Lawmen: Bass Reeves
Outstanding Actor in a Television Movie, Mini-Series or Dramatic Special	Outstanding Actress in a Television Movie, Mini-Series or Dramatic Special
**Keith Powers – The Perfect Find**; Brian Tyree Henry – Class of '09; Courtney B. Vance – Heist 88; Lance Reddick – The Caine Mutiny Court–Martial; Samuel L. Jackson – Secret Invasion	**Chlöe Bailey – Praise This**; Ali Wong – Beef; Dominique Fishback – Swarm; Gabrielle Union – The Perfect Find; Meagan Good – Buying Back My Daughter
Outstanding Supporting Actor in a Television Movie, Limited-Series or Dramatic Special	Outstanding Supporting Actress in a Television Movie, Limited-Series or Dramatic Special
**Don Cheadle – Secret Invasion**; Carl Anthony Payne II – Binged to Death; Damon Wayans – Cinnamon; Damson Idris – Swarm; Jharrel Jerome – Full Circle	**Phylicia Rashad – Heaven Down Here**; Aja Naomi King – Lessons in Chemistry; CCH Pounder – Full Circle; Michaela Jaé Rodriguez – American Horror Story: Delicate; Tisha Campbell – Every Breath She Takes
Outstanding Directing in a Television Movie or Special	Outstanding Writing in a Television Movie or Special
**Chris Robinson – Shooting Stars**; Bryian Keith Montgomery Jr. – Cinnamon; Keke Palmer – Big Boss; Numa Perrier – The Perfect Find; Vivica A. Fox – First Lady of BMF: The Tonesa Welch Story	**Dwayne Johnson–Cochran – Heist 88**; Frank E. Flowers, Tony Rettenmaier, Juel Taylor – Shooting Stars; Marlon Wayans – Marlon Wayans: God Loves Me; Sam Jay – Sam Jay: Salute Me or Shoot Me; Tina Gordon, Brandon Broussard, Hudson Obayuwana, Jana Savage, Camilla Blackett – Praise This

==== Overall Acting ====
Outstanding Character Voice-Over Performance (Television)	Outstanding Guest Performance
**Kyla Pratt – The Proud Family: Louder and Prouder**; Cree Summer – Rugrats; Issa Rae – Young Love; Keke Palmer – The Proud Family: Louder and Prouder; Scott Mescudi – Young Love	**Michael B. Jordan – Saturday Night Live**; Ayo Edebiri – Abbott Elementary; Garcelle Beauvais – Survival of the Thickest; Giancarlo Esposito – The Mandalorian; Roy Wood Jr. – The Daily Show
Outstanding Performance by a Youth (Series, Special, Television Movie or Limited-series)
**Leah Sava Jeffries – Percy Jackson and the Olympians**; Alaya High – That Girl Lay Lay; Elisha “EJ” Williams – The Wonder Years; Jalyn Hall – The Crossover; Keivonn Woodard – The Last of Us

==== Reality and Variety ====
Outstanding Talk Series	Outstanding Reality Program, Reality Competition Series or Game Show
**The Jennifer Hudson Show**; Hart to Heart; Sherri; Tamron Hall; Turning the Tables with Robin Roberts	**Wild 'N Out**; America's Got Talent; Barbecue Showdown; Celebrity Family Feud; Critter Fixers: Country Vets
Outstanding News / Information – (Series or Special)	Outstanding Host in a Talk or News / Information (Series or Special)
**20/20** **– Kerry Washington: Thicker Than Water – A Conversation with Robin Roberts**; The 1619 Project; TheGrio with Marc Lamont Hill; The Reidout; Into America	**Sherri Shepherd – Sherri**; Bomani Jones – Game Theory with Bomani Jones; Joy Reid – The Reidout; Tamron Hall – Tamron Hall; Whoopi Goldberg, Joy Behar, Sunny Hostin, Sara Haines, Ana Navarro, Alyssa Farah Griffin – The View
Outstanding Variety Show (Series or Special)	Outstanding Host in a Reality, Game Show or Variety (Series or Special)
**A Black Lady Sketch Show**; A Grammy Salute to 50 Years of Hip–Hop; Chris Rock: Selective Outrage; My Name is Mo'Nique; Wanda Sykes: I'm An Entertainer	**DC Young Fly – Celebrity Squares**; Anthony Anderson, Cedric the Entertainer – Kings of BBQ; Nick Cannon – The Masked Singer; RuPaul Charles – RuPaul's Drag Race; Steve Harvey – Celebrity Family Feud

==== Other Categories ====
Outstanding Short-Form Series (Drama or Comedy)	Outstanding Short-Form Series - Reality/Nonfiction
**Doggyland**; After the Cut; Die Hart 2: Die Harter; Launchpad; I Am Groot	**I Was A Soul Train Dancer**; Did You Know?; Mama Mann's Kitchen; Ritual; RuPaul's Drag Race
Outstanding Animated Series	Outstanding Children's Program
**The Proud Family: Louder and Prouder**; Big Mouth; Gracie's Corner; Marvel's Spidey and His Amazing Friends; Young Love	**Gracie's Corner**; Ada Twist, Scientist; Alma's Way; Craig of the Creek; My Dad the Bounty Hunter
Outstanding Performance in a Short Form Series	Outstanding Breakthrough Creative (Television)
**Leslie Jones – After the Cut–The Daily Show**; Jessica Mikayla – Launchpad; Kevin Hart – Die Hart 2: Die Harter; Nathalie Emmanuel – Die Hart 2: Die Harter; Seth Carr – Launchpad	**Michelle Buteau – Survival of the Thickest**; Adjani Salmon – Dreaming Whilst Black; Kale Futterman – Ginny & Georgia; Thara Popoola – Sex Education; Troy Hunter – Sex Education

=== Documentary ===
Outstanding Documentary (Film)	Outstanding Documentary (Television)
**Invisible Beauty**; American Symphony; Fast Dreams; Little Richard: I Am Everything; Stamped from the Beginning	**High on the Hog: How African American Cuisine Transformed America**; American Experience; Dear Mama; Kevin Hart & Chris Rock: Headliners Only; Ladies First: A Story of Women in Hip-Hop
Outstanding Short Form Documentary	Outstanding Directing in a Documentary
**Black Girls Play: The Story of Hand Games**; Alive in Bronze: Huey P. Newton; Birthing a Nation: The Resistance of Mary Gaffney; Freshwater; Ifine: Beauty	**Allen Hughes – Dear Mama**; Bethann Hardison, Frédéric Tcheng – Invisible Beauty; Dave Wooley, David Heilbroner – Dionne Warwick: Don't Make Me Over; Lisa Cortés – Little Richard: I Am Everything; Roger Ross Williams – Stamped from the Beginning

=== Costume Design, Make-up and Hairstyling ===
Outstanding Costume Design	Outstanding Make-up
**Francine Jamison–Tanchuck – The Color Purple**; Charlese Antoinette Jones – Air; Deirdra Elizabeth Govan – I’m A Virgo; Toni–Leslie James, Josh Quinn – Rustin; Marci Rodgers, Richard Gross, Paul A. Simmons Jr. – Shooting Stars	**Carol Rasheed, Saisha Beecham, Ngozi Olandu Young, Manny Davila, Milene Melendez – The Color Purple**; Cole Patterson, Fabiola Mercado – Bel–Air; Miho Suzuki – Lessons in Chemistry; Beverly Jo Pryor, Eric Pagdin, Quintessence Patterson – Rustin; Denise Pugh–Ruiz – UnPrisoned
Outstanding Hairstyling
**Lawrence Davis, Tym Wallace, Andrea Mona Bowen, Angela Renae Dyson, Jorge Benitez Villalobos – The Color Purple**; Shavonne Brown – A Black Lady Sketch Show; Carla Joi Farmer – Air; Elizabeth Robinson – Creed III; Melissa “Missy” Forney, Sterfon Demings – A Black Lady Sketch Show

=== Stunt ===
Outstanding Stunt Ensemble (TV or Film)
- **Creed III**
  - The Continental: From the World of John Wick
  - They Cloned Tyrone
  - Titans
  - Warrior

=== Recording ===
Outstanding Album	Outstanding New Artist
**Jaguar II – Victoria Monét**; Clear 2: Soft Life EP – Summer Walker; For All the Dogs – Drake; I Told Them... – Burna Boy; The Age of Pleasure – Janelle Monáe	**Victoria Monét**; FLO; Jordan Ward; Leon Thomas; October London
Outstanding Male Artist	Outstanding Female Artist
**Usher**; Burna Boy; Chris Brown; Davido; Jon Batiste	**H.E.R.**; Ari Lennox; Janelle Monáe; Tems; Victoria Monét
Outstanding Duo, Group or Collaboration (Traditional)	Outstanding Duo, Group or Collaboration (Contemporary)
**"How We Roll" – Ciara & Chris Brown**; "ICU (Remix)" – Coco Jones feat. Justin Timberlake; Creed III: Soundtrack – Dreamville, Bas & Black Sherif feat. Kel-P; "God Is Good" – Karen Clark Sheard, Hezekiah Walker & Kierra Sheard; "Joy (Unspeakable)" – Voices of Fire	**"Sensational" – Chris Brown feat. Davido & Lojay**; "Sittin' on Top of the World" – Burna Boy feat. 21 Savage; "All My Life" – Lil Durk feat. J. Cole; "Good Good" – Usher, Summer Walker & 21 Savage; "Smoke" – Victoria Monét feat. Lucky Daye
Outstanding Soul/R&B Song	Outstanding Hip Hop/Rap Song
**"ICU (Remix)" – Coco Jones feat. Justin Timberlake**; "Back to Your Place" – October London; "Good Good" – Usher, Summer Walker & 21 Savage; "Lipstick Lover" – Janelle Monáe; "On My Mama" – Victoria Monét	"**Cobra" – Megan Thee Stallion**; "All My Life" – Lil Durk feat. J. Cole; "Blue Eyes" – Vic Mensa; "Palisades, CA" – Larry June, Big Sean & The Alchemist; "Sittin' on Top of the World" – Burna Boy feat. 21 Savage
Outstanding International Song	Outstanding Music Video/Visual Album
"**Me & U" – Tems**; "Amapiano" – Asake feat. Olamide; "City Boys" – Burna Boy; "People" – Libianca feat. Ayra Starr & Omah Lay; "Unavailable" – Davido feat. Musa Keys	**"Sensational" – Chris Brown feat. Davido & Lojay**; "Boyfriend" – Usher; "Cobra" – Megan Thee Stallion; "How We Roll" – Ciara & Chris Brown; "On My Mama" – Victoria Monét
Outstanding Original Score for TV/Film	Outstanding Soundtrack/Compilation Album
**Transformers: Rise of the Beasts – Jongnic Bontemps**; American Fiction – Laura Karpman; Rustin – Branford Marsalis; The Color Purple – Kris Bowers; The Other Black Girl – EmmoLei Sankofa	**The Color Purple (2023 Original Motion Picture Soundtrack) – Various Producers**; Creed III: The Soundtrack – Michael B. Jordan, Ludwig Goransson, Archie Davis & Frank Brim; The Super Mario Bros. Movie (soundtrack) – Brian Tyler; Spider-Man: Across the Spider-Verse (Soundtrack From and Inspired by the Motion Picture – Deluxe Edition) – Metro Boomin; The Little Mermaid (2023 Original Motion Picture Soundtrack) – Alan Menken, Mike Higham & Lin-Manuel Miranda
Outstanding Gospel/Christian Album	Outstanding Gospel/Christian Song
**Father's Day – Kirk Franklin**; All Yours – Kierra Sheard; Impossible – Pastor Mike Jr.; My Truth – Jonathan McReynolds; The Maverick Way Complete – Maverick City Music	"**All Yours" – Kierra Sheard feat. Anthony Brown**; "All Things" – Kirk Franklin; "In the Room" – Maverick City Music; "It's Working" – Todd Dulaney; "Joy (Unspeakable)" – Voices of Fire feat. Pharrell Williams
Outstanding Jazz Album
**Brand New Life –** **Brandee Younger**; Melusine – Cécile McLorin Salvant; Phoenix – Lakecia Benjamin; Truth Be Told – Angie Wells; Who Are You When No One is Watching? – Braxton Cook

=== Podcast and Social Media ===
Outstanding News and Information Podcast	Outstanding Lifestyle/Self-Help Podcast
**Holding Court with Eboni K. Williams**; #SundayCivics; Going Wild with Dr. Rae Wynn-Grant; Into America with Trymaine Lee; The Assignment with Audie Cornish	**Black Money Tree**; Chile, Please; Is This Going to Cause an Argument?; The Laverne Cox Show; The Light
Outstanding Society and Culture Podcast	Outstanding Arts and Entertainment Podcast
**The 85 South Show with Karlous Miller, DC Young Fly and Chico Bean**; Higher Learning with Van Lathan and Rachel Lindsay; Jill Scott Presents: J.ill the Podcast; More Than That with Gia Peppers; The Bakari Sellers Podcast	**Here's the Thing**; All the Smoke; Baby, This is Keke Palmer; Being Black: The 80s; Nightcap with Unc and Ocho
Outstanding Scripted Series Podcast	Outstanding Podcast – Limited Series/Short Form
**Yes We Cannabis**; Crimson Hearts Collide; Small Victories; TwentyOne 21: A Black AF Scripted Audio Comedy; Whose Amazing Life?	**Wakanda Forever: The Official Black Panther Podcast**; I Am Story; Official Ignorance: The Death in Custody Podcast; Reclaimed: The Forgotten League; The Greatest Day: The Epic Story Behind Hip-Hop's Most Iconic Photograph
Social Media Personality of the Year
**Angel Laketa Moore**; Druski; Keith Lee; Lynae Vanee; Terrell Grice

=== Literary ===
Outstanding Literary Work – Fiction	Outstanding Literary Work – Nonfiction
**Family Lore – Elizabeth Acevedo**; Everything Is Not Enough – Lola Akinmade Åkerström; House of Eve – Sadeqa Johnson; Let Us Descend – Jesmyn Ward; The Heaven and Earth Grocery Store – James McBride	**The New Brownies’ Book: A Love Letter to Black Families – Karida L. Brown and Charly Palmer**; Black AF History: The Un–Whitewashed Story of America – Michael Harriot; BLK ART: The Audacious Legacy of Black Artists and Models in Western Art – Zaria Ware; Iconic Home: Interiors, Advice, and Stories from 50 Amazing Black Designers – Black Interior Designers and June Reese; The Art of Ruth E. Carter – Ruth E. Carter Foreword by Dani Gurira
Outstanding Literary Work – Debut Author	Outstanding Literary Work – Biography/Autobiography
**Rootless – Krystle Zara Appiah**; And Then He Sang a Lullaby – Ani Kayode Somtochukwu; Coleman Hill: A Novel – Kim Coleman Foote; The Black Joy Project – Kleaver Cruz; The God of Good Looks – Breanne McIvor	**Our Secret Society: Mollie Moon and the Glamour, Money, and Power Behind the Civil Rights Movement – Dr. Tanisha C. Ford**; Love and Justice: A Story of Triumph on Two Different Courts – Maya Moore Irons; Lucky Me: A Memoir of Changing the Odds – Rich Paul; Nothing Is Missing – Nicole Walters; Straight Shooter: A Memoir of Second Chances and First Takes – Stephen A. Smith
Outstanding Literary Work – Instructional	Outstanding Literary Work – Poetry
**Historically Black Phrases: From “I Ain’t One of Your Lil’ Friends” to “Who All Gon” Be There?” – Jarett Hill, Tre’vell Anderson**; Badass Vegan: Fuel Your Body, Ph*ck the System, and Live Your Life Right – John Lewis; Everyday Grand: Soulful Recipes for Celebrating Life’s Big and Small Moments – Jocelyn Delk Adams, Olga Massov; Flower Love: Lush Floral Arrangements for the Heart and Home – Kristen Griffith–VanderYacht; Livable Luxe – Brigette Romanek	**Suddenly we – Evie Shockley**; Above Ground – Clint Smith; So to Speak – Terrance Hayes; The Ferguson Report: An Erasure – Nicole Sealey; Why Fathers Cry at Night – Kwame Alexander
Outstanding Literary Work – Children	Outstanding Literary Work – Youth/Teens
**CROWNED: Magical Folk and Fairy Tales from the Diaspora – Kahran Bethencourt**; How Do You Spell Unfair?: MacNolia Cox and the National Spelling Bee – Carole Boston Weathorford, Frank Morrison; I Absolutely, Positively Love My Spots – Lid’ya C. Rivera, Nina Mata; Is This Love? – Cedella Marley, Alea Marley; Like Lava In My Veins – Derrick Barnes, Shawn Martinbrough	**Everyone's Thinking It – Aleema Omotoni**; Adia Kelbara and the Circle of Shamans – Isi Hendrix; Eb & Flow – Kelly J. Baptist; Fatima Tate Takes the Cake – Khadijah VanBrakle; Friday I’m in Love – Camryn Garrett
Outstanding Graphic Novel
**The Talk – Darrin Bell**; Curlfriends: New in Town – Sharee Miller; Ms Davis: A Graphic Biography – Sybille Titeux de la Croix, Amazing Améziane; Queenie: Godmother of Harlem – Aurelie Levy, Elizabeth Colomba; Stamped from the Beginning: A Graphic History of Racist Ideas in America – Dr. Ibram X Kendi, Joel Christian Gill
