= Cash Only =

Cash Only may mean:

- Cash Only (EP), a 2010 release by the group Millionaires
- Cash Only (film), a 2015 American-Albanian crime thriller film directed by Malik Bader
- Cash Only, a 2021 EP by Hope D
