= Ken Seng =

American cinematographer

Ken Seng is an American cinematographer.

Born in Chicago, Seng would attend Columbia College Chicago, where he graduated with a Bachelor of Arts in 1999. His film credits include Quarantine, Obsessed, Project X, Deadpool, Terminator: Dark Fate, and They Cloned Tyrone. Seng's work on They Cloned Tyrone earned him a nomination for the inaugural NAACP Image Award for Outstanding Cinematography in a Feature Film.

In 2025, Seng became a member of the American Society of Cinematographers.

== Filmography ==
=== Film ===
Year	Title	Director	Notes
2004	A League of Ordinary Gentlemen	Christopher Browne; Alex Browne	Documentary
2004	Zombie Honeymoon	David Gebroe	
2006	Street Thief	Malik Bader	
2007	Khuda Kay Liye	Shoaib Mansoor	With David Le May, Neil Lisk and Ali Mohammad
2008	The Poker House	Lori Petty	
2008	Quarantine	John Erick Dowdle	
2009	Obsessed	Steve Shill	
2009	Sorority Row	Stewart Hendler	
2010	Step Up 3D	Jon M. Chu	
2012	Project X	Nima Nourizadeh	
2012	Disconnect	Henry-Alex Rubin	
2013	Bad Words	Jason Bateman	
2015	The Family Fang	Jason Bateman	
2016	Deadpool	Tim Miller	
2017	5-25-77	Patrick Read Johnson	With David Blood
2019	Killerman	Malik Bader	Also producer
2019	Terminator: Dark Fate	Tim Miller	
2023	They Cloned Tyrone	Juel Taylor	
2025	Back in Action	Seth Gordon	
2025	Stone Cold Fox	Sophie Tabet	
2026	Street Fighter	Kitao Sakurai	

=== Television ===
Year	Title	Director	Episode(s)
2014	Rush	Jonathan Levine	"Pilot"
2017	I'm Dying Up Here	Jonathan Levine	"Pilot"
2017	Ghosted	Jonathan Krisel	"Pilot"
2019-2021	Love, Death & Robots	Tim Miller	"Ice Age"
2019-2021	Love, Death & Robots	Alex Beaty	"Life Hutch"
