= Stivi Paskoski =

Macedonian American actor (born 1974)

- Occupation: Actor
- Years active: 1990–present

Stivi Paskoski (born 1974 or 1975) is a North Macedonian American actor. He hosted the TV series Video Power as Johnny Arcade and played Pete McGonagle on Brotherhood. Paskoski has also appeared in the film Cash Only and episodes of Homicide: Life on the Street, Third Watch, Law & Order: Criminal Intent, Law & Order, and Louie.

== Filmography ==
Year	Title	Role	Notes
1990–1992	Video Power	Johnny Arcade	
1994	PCU	Deege	
2004	Company K	Man in White	
2006	Brotherhood	Pete McGonagle	11 episodes
2007	Once Upon a Film	Stanley	
2008	Off Jackson Avenue	Milot	
2013	The Happy House	Ronnie	
2015	Cash Only	Dino	
2019	Killerman	Petey	
