= Marceline Hugot =

American actress

- Born: Marceline A. Hugot; February 10, 1960 (age 66); Hartford, Connecticut, U.S.
- Occupation: Actress
- Years active: 1988–present

Marceline Hugot (born February 10, 1960) is an American stage and screen actress. She is best known for playing Kathy Geiss on NBC sitcom 30 Rock, and Mrs. Foster on HBO's The Gilded Age. Hugot has also appeared in the films Working Girl, Julie & Julia, To Wong Foo, Thanks for Everything! Julie Newmar, and United 93 and the television shows Sex and the City, Ed, Onion News Network, The Leftovers, and Godless.

== Life and career ==
Marceline A. Hugot was born in Hartford, Connecticut, and had dual citizenship in both the US and France. Her father, François Hugot, was a professor of French studies at Brown University in Providence, Rhode Island. She began acting on College Hill, Providence, Rhode Island, as a freshman in college. While studying at University of California, San Diego for a master's degree in the graduate acting program, Hugot landed roles in films such as Working Girl and Woody Allen's Alice before moving to television with Ellen, ER, Law & Order, and Spin City.

In the 2008 PBS film Jump at the Sun, directed by Sam Pollard, Hugot played 1940s radio personality Mary Margaret McBride opposite Kim Brockington's character Zora Neale Hurston. More recently, she starred as Shirley Martland on AMC's Better Call Saul, Gretel on Fox's Gotham, and in the 2020 American black comedy thriller film Blow the Man Down alongside Annette O'Toole, June Squibb, and Margo Martindale.

On stage, Hugot performed in Eugene O'Neill's A Moon for the Misbegotten at the Actors Theatre of Louisville Victor Jory Theatre in Louisville, Kentucky. She also performed in Jackie Sibblies Drury's Marys Seacole at Lincoln Center Theater’s LCT3 and as Aunt Dorothy in Craig Lucas's play Prelude to a Kiss in 2007 on Broadway at the American Airlines Theatre. Hugot is considered a character actress. "I'm the queen of cameos," says Hugot.

== Filmography ==
=== Film ===
| Year | Title | Role |
|---|---|---|
| 1988 | Working Girl | Bitsy |
| 1989 | Longtime Companion | Soap Opera Reader |
| 1990 | Alice | Monica |
| 1991 | Bed & Breakfast | Eloise |
| 1995 | To Wong Foo, Thanks for Everything! Julie Newmar | Katina |
| 1996 | Dunston Checks In | Mrs. Harrison |
| 1997 | Office Killer | Young Carlotta |
| 1997 | Hudson River Blues | Helen |
| 1998 | Went to Coney Island on a Mission from God... Be Back by Five | Homeless Woman |
| 1999 | The Autumn Heart | Donna |
| 2002 | Personal Velocity | Pam |
| 2003 | Uptown Girls | Nurse |
| 2006 | The Night Listener | Nurse |
| 2006 | Stephanie Daley | Mrs. Werner |
| 2006 | United 93 | Georgine Rose Corrigan |
| 2006 | The Treatment | Upstate Nurse |
| 2006 | Fur: An Imaginary Portrait of Diane Arbus | Tippa Henry |
| 2006 | The Hoax | Talia Merton |
| 2006 | Beautiful Ohio | Math Teacher |
| 2007 | Never Forever | Dr. Hanson |
| 2007 | The Favor | History Teacher |
| 2008 | Be Kind Rewind | City Hall Employee |
| 2008 | The Sisterhood of the Traveling Pants 2 | Parsons |
| 2009 | (Untitled) | Corporate Art Buyer |
| 2009 | The Messenger | Mrs. Flanigan |
| 2009 | The Winning Season | Dr. Parsons |
| 2009 | Motherhood | Curious Tourist |
| 2009 | Confessions of a Shopaholic | Saleswoman |
| 2009 | Julie & Julia | Madame Bernheim |
| 2011 | Win Win | Woman #2 Jogging |
| 2011 | Our Idiot Brother | Judy |
| 2011 | The Oranges | Christmas Caroler |
| 2011 | I Don't Know How She Does It | Beth |
| 2012 | Price Check | Mrs. Raphael |
| 2012 | The Dictator | Woman in Helicopter |
| 2012 | Girl Most Likely | Librarian |
| 2012 | Backwards | Mrs. Atkinson |
| 2012 | The Discoverers | Assistant Dean |
| 2013 | The Incredible Burt Wonderstone | Piñata Woman |
| 2013 | The Happy House | Hildie |
| 2013 | Labor Day | Mrs. Farnsworth |
| 2013 | Cold Comes the Night | Denise |
| 2014 | The Last Five Years | Mrs. Whitfield |
| 2015 | Slow Learners | Joyce Lowry |
| 2016 | Indignation | Dorm Matron |
| 2016 | Certain Women | Teacher 3 |
| 2016 | Custody | ACS Rep |
| 2017 | Freak Show | Mrs. Monusky |
| 2017 | The Meyerowitz Stories | Lady at Gallery Opening |
| 2018 | Tully | Nosy Customer |
| 2018 | A Vigilante | Counseling Group Woman #2 |
| 2018 | Wanderland | Donny's Mom |
| 2018 | To Dust | Carol |
| 2019 | The Sunlit Night | Mrs. Glenny |
| 2019 | Blow the Man Down | Doreen Burke |
| 2019 | A Call to Spy | Sister Francis |
| 2020 | I'm Your Woman | Evelyn |
| 2022 | Mr. Harrigan's Phone | Old Woman |
| 2022 | She Said | Linda Fairstein |
| 2024 | Which Brings Me to You | Olivia |
| 2026 | Take Me Home | Joan |

=== Television ===
| Year | Title | Role | Notes |
|---|---|---|---|
| 1995 | Ellen | The Nurse | "The Therapy Episode" |
| 1995 | ER | Bonnie Curtis | "Everything Old Is New Again" |
| 1998 | Law & Order | Dr. Sandi Ruskin | "Grief" |
| 1998 | Remember WENN | Nurse Naomi Brumpton | "And If I Die Before I Sleep" |
| 1999 | Spin City | Doggie Day Care | "How to Bury a Millionaire" |
| 2000 | Now and Again | Nurse | "The Bugmeister" |
| 2000 | Cupid & Cate | Tourist Woman | TV movie |
| 2000 | Sex and the City | Mary | "Where There's Smoke..." |
| 2001 | Law & Order: Criminal Intent | Gloria | "Art" |
| 2002–2003 | Ed | Mrs. Vanacore | 2 episodes |
| 2004, 2011 | Law & Order: Special Victims Unit | Leslie Price / Sister | 2 episodes |
| 2006 | Law & Order: Trial by Jury | Justine Ashford | "Eros in the Upper Eighties" |
| 2007–2013 | 30 Rock | Kathy Geiss | 12 episodes |
| 2008 | American Masters | Mary Margaret McBride | "Jump at the Sun" |
| 2011 | Blue Bloods | Mrs. Carmichael | "Age of Innocence" |
| 2011 | Mildred Pierce | Table Two Woman | 2 episodes |
| 2011 | Boardwalk Empire | Sister Bernice | "21" |
| 2011 | Onion News Network | Mayor Sue Hallinan | 5 episodes |
| 2013 | The Big C | Ina | "The Finale" |
| 2013 | Zero Hour | Nurse | "Suspension"; uncredited |
| 2014–2023 | The Blacklist | Mother | 2 episodes |
| 2015 | Nurse Jackie | Pawnbroker | "Deal" |
| 2015 | Power | Bar Judge | "Ghost Is Dead" |
| 2015 | Flesh and Bone | Matilda | "Scorched Earth" |
| 2014–2015 | The Leftovers | Gladys | 7 episodes |
| 2016 | The Good Wife | Edna | "Iowa" |
| 2016 | The Daily Show with Trevor Noah | Betty Childs | "Joe Nocera" |
| 2016 | The Americans | Theresa Rawlings | "Dinner for Seven" |
| 2016 | Falling Water | Beverley | "Three Half Blind Mice" |
| 2017 | Chicago P.D. | Geraldine Crane | "Remember the Devil" |
| 2017 | The Detour | Judith | 3 episodes |
| 2017 | Godless | Lucy Cole | 3 episodes |
| 2018 | Madam Secretary | Evelyn Schultz | "My Funny Valentine" |
| 2018 | The Sinner | Sister Joanna | "Part VII" |
| 2018 | Better Call Saul | Shirley Martland | "Wiedersehen" |
| 2019 | Gotham | Gretel | "Legend of the Dark Knight: Pena Dura" |
| 2019, 2023 | What We Do in the Shadows | Barbara Lazarro | 2 episodes |
| 2020 | New Amsterdam | Annie Singer | "14 Years, 2 Months, 8 Days" |
| 2020 | Ozark | Anita Knarlson | 2 episodes |
| 2020 | Love Life | Sharon Field | "Bradley Field" |
| 2021 | Dr. Death | Rose Keller | 3 episodes |
| 2021 | Evil | Head Nun | "U Is for U.F.O." |
| 2021 | Chicago Fire | Sister Montclair | 2 episodes |
| 2021 | Dickinson | Patient | "A little Madness in the Spring" |
| 2021 | FBI: Most Wanted | Blanche | "Run-Hide-Fight" |
| 2022 | The Marvelous Mrs. Maisel | Molly | 3 episodes |
| 2023 | Black Mirror | Bookshop Clerk | "Beyond the Sea" |
| 2025 | The Gilded Age | Mrs. Foster | 2 episodes |

=== Stage ===
| Year | Title | Role | Theater |
|---|---|---|---|
| Jan 7 – 24, 1987 | A Moon for the Misbegotten | Josie Hogan | Victor Jory Theatre |
| Nov 4 – 22, 1987 | Coriolanus | Valeria | McCarter Theatre |
| Feb 3 – May 7, 1989 | Measure for Measure | Francisca | Mitzi E. Newhouse Theater |
| Nov 1, 1992 – Jan 31, 1993 | Them...Within Us | Sarah | Theatre Row |
| Nov 3, 1998 – Jan 2, 1999 | Twelfth Night | Maria | The Lansburgh Theatre |
| Apr 17 – Jun 5, 1999 | The Cider House Rules, Part One: Here in St. Cloud's | Nurse Edna/Prostitute | Atlantic Theater Company Linda Gross Theater |
| Feb 17 – Apr 29, 2007 | Prelude to a Kiss | Leah/Aunt Dorothy | American Airlines Theatre |
| Feb 9 – Mar 24, 2019 | Marys Seacole | Merry | The Claire Tow Theater at Lincoln Center |
