= A League of Ordinary Gentlemen =

- Directed by: Christopher Browne and Alex Browne
- Written by: Christopher Browne
- Produced by: Christopher Browne
- Starring: Wayne Webb; Pete Weber; Walter Ray Williams Jr. Chris Barnes; Steve Miller
- Cinematography: Ken Seng
- Edited by: Kurt Engfehr; David S. Tung
- Music by: Gary Meister
- Distributed by: Magnolia Home Entertainment
- Release date: March 21, 2006
- Running time: 93 min.
- Language: English

A League of Ordinary Gentlemen is a documentary film about ten-pin bowling that was released on DVD on March 21, 2006. It was written and directed by Christopher Browne and stars PBA Tour players Pete Weber, Walter Ray Williams Jr., Chris Barnes and Wayne Webb, along with then-PBA Commissioner Steve Miller.

It was first televised nationally on the PBS series Independent Lens on April 25, 2006.

== Synopsis ==
The documentary takes place in the 2002–03 PBA Tour season, and follows four professional ten-pin bowlers who are at various stages of their careers. Facing declining popularity and TV ratings, the Professional Bowlers Association had been recently purchased by a trio of Microsoft programmers, who then hired Steve Miller, a Nike marketing guru, to revitalize the sport.

== Cast ==
- Steve Miller
- Wayne Webb, a 20-time champion, 1980 PBA Player of the Year, and 1993 PBA Hall of Fame inductee who has fallen on hard times
- Pete Weber, son of legendary bowler Dick Weber and renowned "bad boy" of the PBA who was serving a disciplinary suspension when the PBA Tour was purchased
- Walter Ray Williams Jr., the dominant player on tour, with 36 PBA titles; he wins his 37th title near the end of this film and, in an iconic statement about the life of a professional bowler, celebrates by shoveling snow off the roof of his motor home
- Chris Barnes, a comparatively young pro trying to support his wife and newborn twins

== Soundtrack ==
The documentary features the song by comedian Stephen Lynch called "Bowling Song (Almighty Malachi, Professional Bowling God)." This track is featured on Lynch's second official album, Superhero, released in 2002.

== DVD features ==
- Deleted Scenes
- PBA TV Spots
- Skills Challenge Highlights
- PBA Event Clips
- Dexter Approach: Tips and Techniques (Hosted by 13-time PBA Tour titlist and current Fox Sports 1 (FS1) TV color-analyst Randy Pedersen.)
- Theatrical Trailer

== Reception ==
On review aggregator website Rotten Tomatoes, the film holds an approval rating of 91% based on 34 reviews, with an average rating of 7.2/10.

== Featured bowlers after the film ==
Wayne Webb never won another regular PBA Tour title after the completion of the film. He now runs Wayne Webb's Columbus Bowl in Columbus, Ohio, and for several years ran a karaoke business on the side. He later joined the PBA Senior Tour (for players age 50 and older, now named the PBA50 Tour), and made a splash by winning the 2008 Senior U.S. Open. In 2010, he was named PBA Senior Player of the Year.

Chris Barnes earned his first-ever PBA Player of the Year award in the 2007–08 season. He twice won what was (at the time) the biggest prize check in the history of televised bowling ($200,000) by winning the Motel 6 Roll to Riches events in 2005 and 2006. Barnes was inducted into the PBA Hall of Fame in 2018, and won his 19th PBA Tour title later that year. Barnes now also competes on the PBA50 Tour, where he has won eight titles.

In September, 2006, Walter Ray Williams Jr. surpassed Earl Anthony for first place on the PBA's All-Time titles list with his win over Pete Weber in the Dydo Japan Cup. Walter earned 47 PBA Tour titles (the most all-time), with his final title coming at the USBC Masters in February, 2010. Williams also won his record seventh Chris Schenkel PBA Player of the Year award in 2010, becoming the oldest player (50) to do so. He retired from the standard PBA Tour in 2021 at age 61, but still participates on the PBA50 Tour. In August 2021, Williams won his 15th PBA50 Tour title, surpassing John Handegard for the most titles all-time on that tour. He won his 16th PBA50 title at age 63 in the 2022 season, and continues to bowl on the PBA50 Tour as of 2025.

As of 2025, Pete Weber is fourth on the PBA's all-time list with 37 titles, with his most recent title coming at age 50 in the PBA Tournament of Champions on March 31, 2013. At the time, that victory tied Weber with Earl Anthony for the most major championships in PBA Tour history (10). A year earlier (2012), Weber won his record fifth U.S. Open title. Like Williams, Weber retired from the regular PBA Tour in 2021, but continues to compete on the PBA50 Tour, where he has won 14 titles.

== Legacy ==
The seventh episode of the third season of the IFC series Documentary Now!, "Any Given Saturday Afternoon", is a parody of A League of Ordinary Gentlemen.
