= Actors Anonymous =

2013 novel by James Franco

Cover art

Actors Anonymous is a novel by American author and actor James Franco. Published in 2013 by Little A/New Harvest, the novel is a series of connected short stories about actors in Los Angeles. The chapters follow the 12 Steps and the 12 Traditions of Alcoholics Anonymous.

On 11 October 2013, James Franco appeared in a book trailer along with actors Jim Parrack, Scott Haze, Stacey Miller and Mia Serafino to promote the release of the book.

Reception to Actors Anonymous was mixed. Critics complained that the otherwise interesting and well-written stories were marred by name dropping and references to the author's own career and personal philosophy.

== Film adaptation ==
In 2017, Franco's book was adapted into a feature film, Actors Anonymous, starring James Franco, Eric Roberts, Emma Rigby, Scott Haze, Jake Robbins, Carmen Argenziano, and Horatio Sanz. The film was produced by Rabbit Bandini Productions in collaboration with USC's School of Cinematic Arts and screened at the Cinequest and Newport Beach Film Festival.

The film had an unconventional development process, crafted by a collective of eight writers (Elizabeth Eccher, Nathan Ellis, Matthew Halla, Kaela Rae Jensen, Josh Litman, Theodore Martland, Alex Parslow, Osahon Tongo) and twelve directors (Melanie Aitkenhead, Abi Damaris Corbin, Shaun Duffy, Justin S. Lee, Kelly Luu, Kevin Luu, Jess Maldaner, Leandro Tadashi, Juel Taylor, Jay Wolff, Kerry Yang, Julio Vincent Gambuto), all graduate students at USC's School of Cinematic Arts.

The project was supervised by John Watson, with James Franco playing a pivotal role not only as a cast member but also in a mentorship capacity.
