= They Cloned Tyrone =

2023 film by Juel Taylor

- Release poster
- Directed by: Juel Taylor
- Written by: Tony Rettenmaier; Juel Taylor
- Produced by: Charles D. King; Stephen "Dr." Love; Tony Rettenmaier; Juel Taylor; Jamie Foxx; Datari Turner
- Starring: John Boyega; Teyonah Parris; Jamie Foxx
- Cinematography: Ken Seng
- Edited by: Saira Haider
- Music by: Desmond Murray; Pierre Charles
- Production company: MACRO Media
- Distributed by: Netflix
- Release dates: June 14, 2023 (ABFF); July 14, 2023 (United States); July 21, 2023 (Netflix)
- Running time: 119 minutes
- Country: United States
- Language: English

They Cloned Tyrone is a 2023 American science fiction comedy mystery film directed by Juel Taylor, in his feature film directorial debut, from a screenplay he wrote with Tony Rettenmaier. It stars John Boyega, Teyonah Parris, and Jamie Foxx (who also serves as a producer) as an unlikely trio uncovering a shadow government cloning conspiracy. David Alan Grier and Kiefer Sutherland also appear in supporting roles.

They Cloned Tyrone premiered at the American Black Film Festival on June 14, 2023. It was released in limited theaters on July 14, 2023, before being released by Netflix on July 21. The film received positive reviews from critics.

== Plot ==
Fontaine is a drug dealer in a suburban neighborhood called the Glen. One night, after obtaining payment from one of his customers, Slick Charles, he is killed by an opposing drug dealer named Isaac.

The next morning, Slick is shocked when Fontaine shows up for the money once again, somehow alive and without any recollection of the previous night's events. The two find Slick's sex worker Yo-Yo, to confirm Slick's claims of his death, confusing Fontaine. Recalling a man, bleeding from a gunshot, who was kidnapped by a black SUV, Fontaine leads Slick and Yo-Yo to the vehicle which is now parked outside a house.

Investigating inside, they discover an elevator leading to an underground lab. Inside, a white scientist with an afro tells them that the operation has gone widespread before Slick accidentally kills him after snorting a mysterious white substance he thinks is cocaine which makes him laugh. Before they leave, the trio discovers a corpse lying on a table, identical to Fontaine.

After finding that the entrance to the lab has disappeared the following morning, the trio heads to a fried chicken restaurant, where the diners are all laughing, making Slick realize that the food contains the same substance that he consumed previously. Seducing the restaurant manager, Yo-Yo discovers that the entirety of the Glen is being surveilled and recorded and that the substance is also being used in grape drinks and hair products.

Finding a hidden elevator within a church altar, the trio enter an underground lab facility that spans the entire Glen area and witness Black people being subject to disturbing behavioral experiments. They find that the lab has clones of many Glen residents, including Fontaine and Slick. After Fontaine sets off an alarm, they exit through a strip club. The DJ brainwashes the clubgoers with a song and forces them to chase the trio. A White man named Nixon and a Fontaine clone named Chester show up to halt the clubgoers.

Nixon reveals that scientists conduct experiments on impoverished, predominantly Black populations such as the Glen, to allow the operation to go unnoticed and supposedly achieve peace in America. After briefly using a trigger word to force the entire crowd to follow his commands with the exception of Yo-Yo, putting them at risk, Nixon threatens to use it on the crowd again if the trio doesn't stop their investigation.

Despite this, Yo-Yo decides to take matters into her own hands, but her identity is exposed, and Nixon kidnaps her. Learning of this, Fontaine devises a plan with Isaac and Slick to rescue Yo-Yo, with Fontaine faking his death to sneak into the lab undetected. Fontaine then lets Slick and Isaac in to storm the lab with numerous residents of the Glen. They free the Black people being experimented on, including the clones, while Yo-Yo frees herself and finds Slick.

Chester overpowers and takes Fontaine to an older version of himself, the original Fontaine. He explains that he is helping scientists create "peace" by whitewashing Black people into white people, through mind control and generational breeding. Fontaine's little brother's racially motivated murder by a police officer prompted him to start making the clones. After the original Fontaine claims the country would be better with assimilation than annihilation, Fontaine uses Nixon's trigger word on Chester and has him shoot the original. Meanwhile, Yo-Yo stalls Nixon from killing her before Slick shoots him in the head.

The facility entrance to the church opens, spilling clones out to the public, exposing the secret operation. After Yo-Yo announces her retirement from her job, the trio decides to head to Memphis to further expose and stop the operation.

Meanwhile, in Los Angeles, a man named Tyrone, identical to and living the same lifestyle as Fontaine, is watching TV with his friends, when they see one of Fontaine's clones appear on the news, which baffles him.

== Cast ==
- John Boyega as Fontaine / Old Fontaine / Chester / Tyrone
- Teyonah Parris as "Yo-Yo"
- Jamie Foxx as Charles "Slick Charles"
- Kiefer Sutherland as Nixon
- David Alan Grier as The Preacher
- J. Alphonse Nicholson as Isaac
- Tamberla Perry as Biddy
- Eric Robinson Jr. as "Big" Moss
- Trayce Malachi as "Junebug"
- Shariff Earp as "Crutches"
- Leon Lamar as "Frog"
- Joshua Mikel as DJ Strangelove

== Production ==
Development on the film began in February 2019 when the screenplay was optioned from The Black List of popular but un-produced scripts. It was conceived as a "genre-bending" homage to the Blaxploitation films of the 1970s, featuring elements of satire, mystery, horror, science fiction, and absurdist humor.

In February 2019, it was announced that Brian Tyree Henry was in negotiations to star in the film, with Taylor set to direct under the production company MACRO Media. Later that year in October, John Boyega joined the cast, replacing Henry in the lead role, with production expected to begin in early 2020 and Netflix set to distribute. Jamie Foxx and Teyonah Parris joined the cast in September 2020.

Principal photography began in November 2020, in Atlanta, Georgia. Filming took place in Blackhall Studios and wrapped in April 2021. Taylor cited They Live, Groundhog Day, It Follows, and Napoleon Dynamite as influences on the film.

== Release ==
They Cloned Tyrone premiered at the 27th American Black Film Festival (ABFF) on June 14, 2023. It also screened at the 49th Newark Black Film Festival (NBFF) on July 12, 2023. The film began a limited theatrical release on July 14, 2023, before streaming on Netflix a week later (July 21, 2023).

== Marketing ==
On February 3, 2022, Foxx shared an image of the lead cast in-costume on the set of They Cloned Tyrone. CinemaBlend complimented the "stylish and cool" aesthetic of the costuming, writing: "To say their looks were interesting would be an understatement. Foxx’s asymmetrical high-top alone is a statement. Each character’s personality comes out through their style. Jamie Foxx personifies the high-end slick talker with his high-top, purple felt suit, and faux leather jacket. Teyonah Parris comes off as a Blaxploitation star mixed with futurism with her natural hair, faux fur yellow coat, leopard print pants, and thigh-high boots. John Boyega goes full grimy hustler in his gold tooth and striped track pants with a green hoodie and padded jacket".

A teaser trailer for the film was released, on September 24, 2022, during Netflix's global fan event Tudum. It featured a rendition of the Gap Band's 1982 song "You Dropped a Bomb on Me". Deadline wrote that the trailer "vibes a stylized modern yet 1970s feel". Erin Brady of /Film liked the premise and characters introduced in the trailer and remarked: "If this isn't sci-fi throwback pulp, then what is?" Jeremy Fuster of TheWrap compared the film's conspiracy-theorist plot to the infamous Tuskegee Syphilis Study, a government-funded medical study done on black subjects in Tuskegee, Alabama between 1932 and 1972.

Netflix released a trio of character posters on June 12, 2023, featuring the lead cast in stylized silhouettes. Cameron Bonomolo of ComicBook.com called them "trippy", while Collider speculated that "[the] shrouding of these protagonists in mystery might be a pointed reminder to audiences of the conspiracy that needs solving in the film". An official trailer was released the following day. Lengthier in runtime, it featured a rendition of the 1984 single by Rockwell featuring Michael Jackson, "Somebody's Watching Me". Yasmeen Hamadeh of Mashable complimented: "With its high-thrills trailer promising hilarious hijinks and '70s galore, They Cloned Tyrone is a must-add to your Netflix watch list".

In their May 2023 issues, Empire and Entertainment Weekly published stories on They Cloned Tyrone, accompanied by several images from the film.

== Reception ==
On the review aggregator website Rotten Tomatoes, 95% of 133 critics' reviews are positive, with an average rating of 7.5/10. The website's consensus reads: "They Cloned Tyrone is provocative, clever sci-fi with an exceptional cast." Metacritic, which uses a weighted average, assigned the film a score of 74 out of 100, based on 27 critics, indicating "generally favorable" reviews.

In her review of the film for The Hollywood Reporter, Lovia Gyarkye called They Cloned Tyrone a "compelling ride" and praised the "sleek" direction, "savvy" score and "reliably funny" cast performances. In The Guardian, Peter Bradshaw described it as an "odd, slightly baffling but likable piece of work [...] with its own peculiarly unexpected innocence and charm" and commended the "powerhouse performances" from the lead cast. Amon Warmann gave the film rating of 4 out of 5 stars in his review for Empire and called it a "stylish, laugh-out-loud blast that has something to say but doesn't sacrifice enjoyment to do so, anchored by a trio of great performances". Debiparna Chakraborty of Far Out magazine gave the film a rating of 3.5/5, writing: "While it may exhibit moments of unevenness, They Cloned Tyrone still makes for an entertaining ride with the potential to become a cult favourite."

In IndieWire, Christian Zilko gave the film a B+ grade, noting similarities between the film and Sorry to Bother You in their "genre-bending social satire" and praising the "infectious" chemistry of the lead cast. Todd McCarthy of Deadline admired the cast performances and production design, but found the film never quite reaches its full potential, summarizing: "They Cloned Tyrone seems poised to become something that, at least initially, feels fresh, a conjunction of sci-fi and blaxploitation that, 50 years after the latter genre's heyday, could possibly give it a welcome recharge, if not a full-bodied return. But, as ready as the audience might be to be transported to hitherto unvisited districts of the genre's potential universe, Tyrone never quite gets there". Owen Gleiberman of Variety wrote that despite its "good set-up", "the film is too sketchy and conceptual to work as a bad-dream thriller".

In an essay about the new wave of black, satirical, absurdist films, Maya Phillips in The New York Times criticized Get Out and American Fiction for being limited by the way they "aimed at white liberal audiences so they can feel in on the joke. black audiences, on the other hand, are left with a simplified representation of their race that doesn’t dare be too controversial." Phillips contrasted They Cloned Tyrone favorably with those movies and suggested the film succeeds because it is "not just about the way characters speak or the exaggerated depictions of their lives; it’s also about their internal conflicts, whether they choose to submit to a racist narrative."

=== Accolades ===
Award	Date of ceremony	Category	Recipient(s)	Result	Ref.
Black Reel Awards	January 16, 2024	Outstanding Lead Performance	John Boyega	Nominated	
Black Reel Awards	January 16, 2024	Outstanding Supporting Performance	Jamie Foxx	Nominated	
Black Reel Awards	January 16, 2024	Outstanding Screenplay	Juel Taylor and Tony Rettenmaier	Nominated	
Black Reel Awards	January 16, 2024	Outstanding Ensemble (Cast Director)	Kim Coleman	Nominated	
Black Reel Awards	January 16, 2024	Outstanding Emerging Director	Juel Taylor	Nominated	
Black Reel Awards	January 16, 2024	Outstanding Score	Desmond Murray and Pierre Charles	Nominated	
Black Reel Awards	January 16, 2024	Outstanding Costume Design	Francine Jamison-Tanchuck	Nominated	
Black Reel Awards	January 16, 2024	Outstanding Editing	Saira Haider	Nominated	
Celebration of Cinema & Television	December 4, 2023	Producer Award	Charles D. King	Won	
Gotham Independent Film Awards	November 27, 2023	Outstanding Supporting Performance	Jamie Foxx	Nominated	
NAACP Image Awards	March 16, 2024	Outstanding Motion Picture	They Cloned Tyrone	Nominated	
NAACP Image Awards	March 16, 2024	Outstanding Directing in a Motion Picture	Juel Taylor	Nominated	
NAACP Image Awards	March 16, 2024	Outstanding Actor in a Motion Picture	John Boyega	Nominated	
NAACP Image Awards	March 16, 2024	Outstanding Breakthrough Creative Motion Picture	Juel Taylor	Nominated	
NAACP Image Awards	March 16, 2024	Outstanding Supporting Actor in a Motion Picture	Jamie Foxx	Nominated	
NAACP Image Awards	March 16, 2024	Outstanding Ensemble Cast in a Motion Picture	The Cast of They Cloned Tyrone	Nominated	
NAACP Image Awards	March 16, 2024	Outstanding Writing in a Motion Picture	Juel Taylor and Tony Rettenmaier	Nominated	
NAACP Image Awards	March 16, 2024	Outstanding Cinematography in a Feature Film	Ken Seng	Nominated	
NAACP Image Awards	March 16, 2024	Outstanding Stunt Ensemble (TV or Film)	The Stunt of They Cloned Tyrone	Nominated	
