= Emma Rigby =

British actress and model (born 1989)

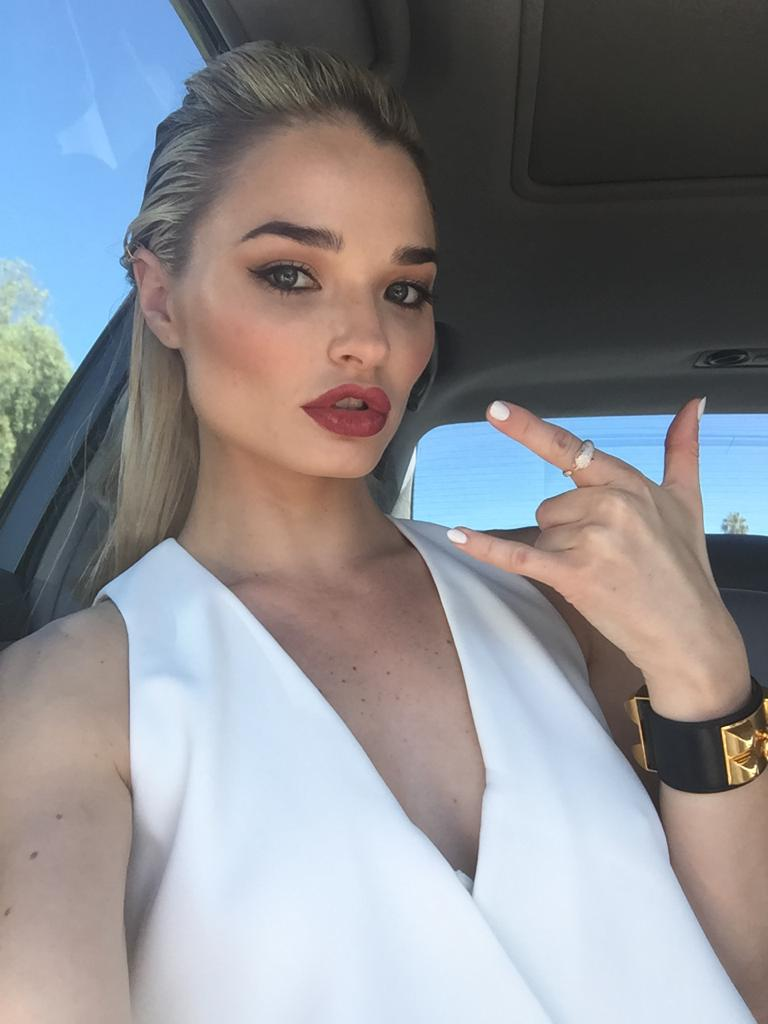
- Rigby in 2022
- Born: 26 September 1989 (age 37); St Helens, Merseyside, England
- Occupations: Actress; model
- Years active: 2003–present

Emma Rigby (born 26 September 1989) is an English actress and model. After rising to prominence for her role as Hannah Ashworth in Hollyoaks (2005–2010, 2024), she later played Gemma Roscoe in the BBC One drama series Prisoners' Wives and as the Red Queen in the American fantasy-drama Once Upon a Time in Wonderland. She also played the lead role of Angie in Movies 24's A Cinderella Christmas, directed by Tosca Musk.

== Early life ==
Rigby was born in St Helens, Merseyside, she attended De La Salle High School, where she began working professionally at the age of 14.

== Career ==
Rigby's television debut came in June 2003 as Lisa Gunstone in the BBC's drama series Born and Bred. She also played Elena Jones, schoolfriend of Anthony Murray (Raymond Quinn), in four episodes of the Channel 4 soap Brookside in the same year.

In 2005, at the age of 15, Rigby was cast as Hannah Ashworth in Hollyoaks. She received praise and recognition for her character's anorexia storyline, in which she was nominated for various awards, including winning the British Soap Award for Best Actress in 2008.

In 2008, Rigby announced she was leaving Hollyoaks in November to pursue other projects, and would remain on-screen until June 2009. However, after meetings with soap bosses, Rigby extended her contract for an additional six months and remained on-screen until February 2010. Her final episode was broadcast on 11 February 2010.

It was announced in November 2023 that Rigby would return to Hollyoaks in 2024. She remained on the show until July of that year.

In 2010, Rigby made her debut in the West End thriller musical Wolfboy. She had a non-singing part, playing the role of nurse Cherry. She received positive feedback from critics. Rigby has modelled for over a decade, shooting a campaign with the photographer Rory Lewis in late February 2010. From 2009 to 2011 she starred in several short films, including the award-winning Talk.

In 2011, Rigby starred as Brandy Mulligan in online series Becoming Human. The same year, she appeared in the horror film Demons Never Die, and in September she had a role in the first episode of the C4 comedy Fresh Meat as Rachel.

In 2012, Rigby starred in the six-part drama series Prisoners' Wives, along with Jonas Armstrong. The show's first episode aired on 31 January 2012. Rigby played Gemma Roscoe, a young pregnant girl whose life falls apart when her husband is arrested for murder. In March 2012, she had a guest role in Pramface as Mike's blind date Carrie-Ann. In June 2012, it was announced that she had scored the female lead in The Physician alongside Ben Kingsley. The film was released in late 2013. Also in 2013, she made her US film debut with a role in the Ridley Scott film The Counsellor.

In 2013, Rigby appeared in episode four of Ripper Street as Lucy Eames, and in episode one of The Job Lot.

In April 2013, Rigby was cast in a lead role as the Red Queen in the U.S. television series Once Upon a Time in Wonderland. In 2014 she starred in the remake of Endless Love and also played the female lead in the British crime film Plastic which is based on a true story, about a group of English university students running a successful credit card scam. In 2015, Rigby worked alongside James Franco in the movie adaptation of his book Actors Anonymous. It was released in 2017.

In 2016, Rigby made a return to British television after a three-year absence, with a guest appearance on Death in Paradise. Also in 2016, she had a minor role in the US television remake of Mother, May I Sleep with Danger? which premiered on Lifetime on 18 June. In the summer of 2016, Rigby signed on for her first female lead in a US film, starring as Angie in romantic comedy A Cinderella Christmas. It was filmed during that summer and released in December of the same year. She also shot American crime thriller drama American Violence, playing Olivia Rose, which was released in early 2017.

In 2017, Rigby starred as the female lead in Hollywood Dirt which released on Passionflix in September. In May, Rigby appeared in the first episode of the final series of Inspector George Gently as Betty Platt. In September, Rigby joined the cast of comedy film The Festival. She played Smurf Girl and the film was released in 2018.

In 2018, Rigby guest starred in the first two episodes of Sky One's Bulletproof. In October, Rigby joined the cast of the West End production of Agatha Christie's Witness for the Prosecution. Rigby played Romaine Vole in the play, and made her first appearance in the role at London's County Hall on 20 November 2018 and her final appearance on 26 May 2019. During the Summer, she played Shelley in a newly adapted Black Country version of Amanda Whittington's play Ladies' Day at The Wolverhampton Grand.

In 2019, Rigby appeared in A Guide to Second Date Sex as Tufts.

In 2020, she joined the cast of BBC Three's television film Make Me Famous.

In 2021, she had a featured role in the horror film The Power, as Babs.

== Personal life ==
Rigby was on FHM's 100 Sexiest Women of 2015.

She is an ambassador for the Catholic Agency for Overseas Development CAFOD and for the Douai Foundation.

== Filmography ==
Key
†	Denotes projects that have not yet been released

=== Film ===
Year	Title	Role	Notes	Ref.
2009	A Kingdom Without a King	Alicia Waterstone	Short film	
2010	Talk	Eloise	Short film	
2011	Demons Never Die	Samantha		
2011	Analogue Love	Maggie	Short film	
2013	Girl on a Bicycle	Gail		
2013	The Counselor	Tony's Girlfriend		
2013	The Physician	Rebecca		
2014	Endless Love	Jenny		
2014	Plastic	Frankie		
2016	Mother, May I Sleep with Danger?	Vampire	Television film	
2016	A Cinderella Christmas	Angie Wells	Television film	
2017	Actors Anonymous	Bree		
2017	American Violence	Olivia Rose		
2017	Fabio D'Andrea: The Sleeping Beauty	The Princess	Short film	
2017	Hollywood Dirt	Summer		
2018	The Festival	Smurf Girl		
2018	My Butterfly	Trix Smith	Short film	
2019	The Protector	Camille Logan		
2019	A Guide to Second Date Sex	Tufts		
2020	Make Me Famous	Michelle	Television film	
2021	The Power	Babs		
2025	The Physician II	Rebecca		
2026	Suspect: The Road Rage Killer †	Tracie Andrews	Channel 5 drama	

=== Television ===
Year	Title	Role	Notes	Ref.
2003	Born and Bred	Lisa Gunstone	Episode: "The Magnificent Colin"	
2003	Brookside	Elena Jones	Recurring role; 4 episodes	
2005–2010, 2024	Hollyoaks	Hannah Ashworth	Series regular; 220 episodes	
2009	Hollyoaks Later	Hannah Ashworth	Recurring role; 5 episodes	
2011	Becoming Human	Brandy Mulligan	Series regular; 5 episodes	
2011	Fresh Meat	Rachel	Episode: "Series 1, Episode 1"	
2012	Prisoners' Wives	Gemma Roscoe	Series regular; 6 episodes	
2012	Pramface	Carrie Ann	Episode: "Man of the Moment"	
2013	Ripper Street	Lucy Eames	Episode: "The Good of This City"	
2013	The Job Lot	Chloe Granger	Episode: "Under Pressure"	
2013–2014	Once Upon a Time in Wonderland	Anastasia/Red Queen/White Queen	Series regular; 13 episodes	
2016	Death in Paradise	Laura Hagen	Episode: "The Complex Murder"	
2017	Inspector George Gently	Betty Platt	Episode: "Gently Liberated"	
2018	Endeavour	Carol Thursday	Episode: "Cartouche"	
2018	Bulletproof	Sophie	Recurring role; 2 episodes	
2020	Castlevania	Additional voices	Recurring role; 10 episodes	
2025	Daddy Issues	Cyndi	Episode: "I'm Your Man"	
2026	The Chelsea Detective	Abby Wilsher	Recurring role; 2 episodes "The 13th Earl" Part 1 & 2	

== Stage ==
Year	Title	Role	Venue	Notes	Ref.
2010	Wolfboy	Cherry	Trafalgar Studios, London		
2018	Ladies Day	Shelly	Grand Theatre, Wolverhampton		
2018–2019	Witness for the Prosecution	Romaine Vole	County Hall, London		

== Awards and nominations ==
Year	Award	Category	Work	Result	Refs
2007	British Soap Awards	Best Actress	Hollyoaks	Nominated	
2007	National TV Awards	Most Popular Actress	Hollyoaks	Nominated	
2008	British Soap Awards	Best Actress	Hollyoaks	Won	
2008	British Soap Awards	Best Dramatic Performance	Hollyoaks	Nominated	
2008	British Soap Awards	Best Storyline (for Hannah's Anorexia)	Hollyoaks	Nominated	
2009	British Soap Awards	Sexiest Female	Hollyoaks	Nominated	
2012	TV Choice Awards	Best Actress	Prisoners' Wives	Nominated	

In 2007, at the age of 17, Rigby was nominated for Best Actress in the British Soap Awards (being one year too old to qualify for Best Dramatic Performance for a Young Actor/Actress), but did not make it to the final four. She was also nominated for Most Popular Actress at the National Television Awards. A year later, she won The British Soap Award for Best Actress and was nominated for Best Dramatic Performance, but lost to Jo Joyner.

Her portrayal of Hannah Ashworth's battle with anorexia attracted praise. She won best storyline for Hannah's eating disorder at the annual Hollyoaks awards. She was up against John Paul and Craig's affair, the "Who pushed Clare?" storyline, and Kris and Jess's relationship. At the All About Soap Bubble Awards in April 2008, Rigby won an award for the 'I'm a Survivor' (for the bravest soul in soap) category.
