= Actors Anonymous (film) =

Feature fim

- Directed by: Melanie Aitkenhead; Abi Damaris Corbin; Shaun Duffy; Justin S. Lee; Kelly Luu; Kevin Luu; Jess Maldaner; Leandro Tadashi; Juel Taylor; Jay Wolff; Kerry Yang; Julio Vincent Gambuto
- Written by: Elizabeth Eccher; Nathan Ellis; Matthew Halla; Kaela Rae Jensen; Josh Litman; Theodore Martland; Alex Parslow; Osahon Tongo
- Based on: Actors Anonymous by James Franco
- Produced by: Chris Abernathy; Tim Astor
- Starring: James Franco; Eric Roberts; Emma Rigby; Scott Haze; Jake Robbins; Carmen Argenziano; Horatio Sanz
- Cinematography: Jon Speyers
- Edited by: Saira Haider; Takashi Uchida
- Music by: Jongnic Bontemps; Nathan Matthew David
- Production companies: Elysium Bandini Studios; Rabbit Bandini Productions; USC School of Cinematic Arts
- Distributed by: Front Row Filmed Entertainment
- Release dates: 5 March 2017 (Cinequest Film Festival); 26 April 2017 (Newport Beach Film Festival)
- Running time: 96 minutes
- Country: United States
- Language: English

Actors Anonymous is a 2017 feature film adaptation of James Franco's novel of the same name (Actors Anonymous). The film explores the complex lives of two young actors pursuing stardom in Hollywood while struggling to escape their past. The ensemble cast includes James Franco, Eric Roberts, Emma Rigby, Scott Haze, Jake Robbins, Carmen Argenziano, and Horatio Sanz.

Produced by Rabbi Bandini Productions and Elysium Bandini Studios in collaboration with grad students at USC's School of Cinematic Arts, the film premiered at Cinequest and subsequently screened at the Newport Beach Film Festival.

== Cast ==
- Scott Haze as Sean
- Jake Robbins as Ben
- James Franco as Jake Lamont
- Eric Roberts as Sonny
- Emma Rigby as Bree
- Keegan Allen as Trey
- Horatio Sanz as Juan
- Carmen Argenziano as Mr. Smithson
- Cynthia Murell as Maggie
- Brit Manor as Karen
- Steve Bannos as Marco
- Kimberli Flores as Sabrina

== Production ==
Actors Anonymous had an unconventional development process, crafted by a collective of eight writers and twelve directors, all graduate students at USC's School of Cinematic Arts. The project was supervised by John Watson, with James Franco playing a pivotal role not only as a cast member but also in a mentorship capacity.

Writers

- Elizabeth Eccher
- Nathan Ellis
- Matthew Halla
- Kaela Rae Jensen
- Josh Litman
- Theodore Martland
- Alex Parslow
- Osahon Tongo

Directors

- Melanie Aitkenhead
- Abi Damaris Corbin
- Shaun Duffy
- Justin S. Lee
- Kelly Luu
- Kevin Luu
- Jess Maldaner
- Leandro Tadashi
- Juel Taylor
- Jay Wolff
- Kerry Yang
- Julio Vincent Gambuto

== Reception ==
Si Si Penaloza of Jetset Magazine attributed the film's conceptual coherence to "razor sharp film editing and a savvy checks and balances system between multiple directors."

Crossfader Magazine's Sergio Zaciu described the film as reminiscent of "La La Land, sans the glamor, and an absolutely gut-wrenching portrayal of loss, heartbreak, and defeat." He added that while "it isn't the most polished outing" and "the production value can seesaw between potent indie and flat lo-fi," as a launching pad for hopeful directors, "it succeeds with flying colors."

== Novel ==
Published by Little A/New Harvest in 2013, Actors Anonymous is a novel by American author and actor James Franco that serves as the basis for the 2017 film adaptation. Comprising a series of interconnected short stories, the novel delves into the lives of actors in Los Angeles, structuring its chapters around the 12 Steps and the 12 Traditions of Alcoholics Anonymous.

Some actors that appeared in the book trailer also had roles in the 2017 film, such as Jim Parrack and Scott Haze.
