= Steve Miller (sports executive) =

American athlete, coach and businessman

Biographical details
- Born: September 9, 1943; Chicago, Illinois
- Died: June 15, 2025 (aged 81); Portland, Oregon
- Education: Bradley University (1965); Governors State University (1970); Cal Poly (1978)

Playing career

Football, Track and field
- 1961–1965: Bradley

Coaching career (HC unless noted)

Cross country, Track and field
- 1965–1976: Bloom Township HS (IL)
- 1976–1981: Cal Poly
- 1981–1986: Kansas State

Administrative career (AD unless noted)
- 1986–1987: Kansas State (assoc. AD)
- 1988–1991: Kansas State

Steve Miller (September 9, 1943 - June 15, 2025) was an American athlete, coach and businessman from Chicago.

== Early life ==
Born in Chicago, Miller attended college in his home state of Illinois at Bradley University in Peoria and Governors State University in University Park, earning respectively Bachelor of Science degrees in English literature and physical education and a Masters of Arts degree in contemporary English literature. Miller competed for the Bradley Braves track and field team as a sprinter. He relocated to San Luis Obispo, California to receive a Master of Science degree from California Polytechnic State University.

== Athletics ==
In 1965, Miller played professional American football with the NFL team Detroit Lions, a career path that ended with an injury to his knee after only four exhibition games. After ten years teaching track and English at suburban Chicago's Bloom Township High School, Miller became head coach at California Polytechnic State University until 1981, moving into the same position at Kansas State University until 1987. After a year as president of the Special Olympics in Pennsylvania, Miller returned to Kansas State University to serve for four years as Athletic Director. During his time as the athletic director at Kansas State, Miller was responsible for hiring Hall of Fame football coach Bill Snyder as well as former basketball coach Dana Altman.

== Business ==
When Miller left his position at Kansas State, he entered the world of business. He spent nine years with Nike, from June 1991 to September 2000, serving successively as director of athletics, director of global sports marketing, director of national sports marketing, director of sports marketing Asia Pacific and director of global sports marketing relations. He relinquished his position with Nike following conflict with Phil Knight. In 2000, he took the position of director of the Professional Bowlers Association (PBA), a position he retained until 2005. During his time with the PBA, where he "was hired to make bowling relevant" according to ABC News, Miller stood as a primary focus for the documentary film A League of Ordinary Gentlemen, which spotlighted his efforts to transform the PBA "into a slicker, more colorful media-friendly package".

He was a faculty member at the University of Oregon, serving since 2005 as a senior analyst and adjunct professor at the Lundquist Business School and Warsaw Sports Marketing Center.
