= Rory Lewis =

British photographer (born 1982)

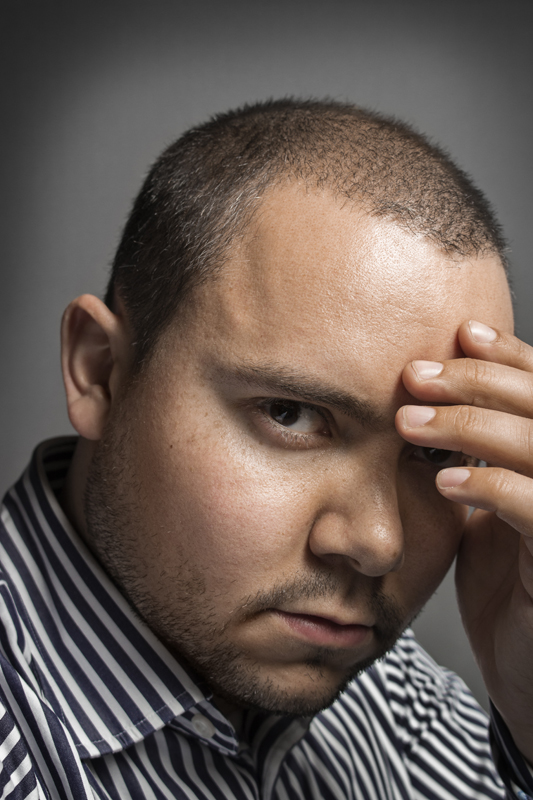
- Lewis, age 32, self portrait
- Born: 5 October 1982 (age 43); Chester, England
- Known for: Photography
- Awards: Winner of The Portrait of Britain 2017, 2018, 2019 & 2020
- Website: www.rorylewis.studio

Rory Lewis (born 5 October 1982 in Chester, England) is a British photographer known for his celebrity portrait photography. Lewis's inspirations include the works of the artists Hans Holbein the younger, Caravaggio, Titian and Thomas Lawrence and the German Expressionist movement of the 1920s.

== Education ==
Lewis originally studied Medieval History at King's College London.

== Works ==
In 2012, Lewis held his first exhibition, Keeping Abreast, at the Bluecoat Gallery in Liverpool. Held in aid of Macmillan Cancer Support, the collection featured unseen portraits.

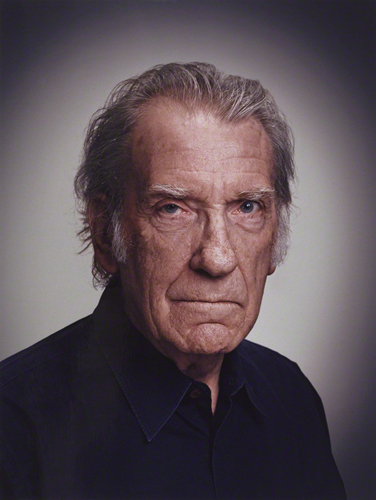
David Warner portrait by Lewis, Nov. 2013

In 2013, his portrait of actor David Warner was acquired by the National Portrait Gallery, London. The portrait was Warner's first sitting since Cecil Beaton photographed him in the mid-1960s.

In 2014, Lewis photographed and held his first major portrait photography exhibition. Entitled 'Northerners', the project was an entirely new collection of portraits from a cross section of northern English actors, celebrities, sports personalities, and politicians. Held in aid of UNICEF, the exhibition featured portraits of Patrick Stewart, Ian McKellen, Ian McShane, Emma Rigby, Beth Tweddle, Craig Charles, General Sir Nick Houghton and Mayor of Liverpool Joe Anderson.

In May 2014, Lewis photographed Uruguayan footballer Luis Suárez in a campaign for Pepsi.

In 2016 Lewis photographed all the remaining Victoria Cross & George Cross recipients for a new portrait project.

In 2017 Lewis photographed actor Rufus Sewell in Los Angeles. The portrait was acquired by the National Portrait Gallery.

Throughout 2016–17, Lewis embarked on a portrait project entitled Soldiery British Army Portraits. Photographing over 278 British soldiers, and publishing a book of the collection. The collection was exhibited at Armed Forces Day Liverpool 24 June and then moved to The National Army Museum in London from 31 January – 12 February 2018.

As part of the Soldiery project, Lewis held portrait sitting with WO2 Deborah Penny, Britain's first transgender soldier to serve in the front line.

In 2018 Lewis embarked on a new project entitled Portraitist, including portraits of former prime minister David Cameron. The portrait sitting was featured by the Guardian Newspaper.
