= Charles Borland =

American actor

Charles John Borland Smith is an American film, stage and television actor. He was born in Minneapolis.

Smith is the co-founder and CEO of VOLTAKU, founded in 2020.

== Broadway ==
- A Streetcar Named Desire as Harold Mitchell/Stanley Kowalski (April–July 2005)
- Twelve Angry Men as Juror #6 (National tour, September–May 2006/07; September–May 2007/08)
- A Man for All Seasons as Jailor (October–December 2008)
- Le Père (The Father) as Man (March–June 2016)

== Off-Broadway ==
- Twelfth Night as Antonio (Delacorte Theater, Shakespeare in the Park, The Public Theater, June–July 2009)
- Spirit Control (by Beau Willimon) as FAA Official/Bill (Manhattan Theatre Club, October–December 2010)

== Selected filmography ==
- Into the Fire (2005), as Wilcox
- Premium Rush (2012), as Campus Guard
- The Happy House (2013), as Desmond
- The Cobbler (2014), as Driver

== TV appearances ==
Year	Series	Episode	Role
2002	Hack	"All Night Long"	Partner Terry
2003	Ed	"Hyenas & Wildebeasts"	Rich Keenan
2003	Third Watch	"10-13"	Romaine
2003	Whoopi	"Shout"	Officer Reid
2005	Jonny Zero	"Man Up"	Roland Danes
2005	As the World Turns	2 episodes	Justin Walker
2005	Law & Order: Criminal Intent	"Stress Position"	Taylor Kenna
2007	Numb3rs	"Money for Nothing"	Frank Tibbet
2007	One Life to Live	Episode #1.10030	George
2007	Law & Order: Criminal Intent	"Courtship"	FBI Agent Frank Billings
2008	New Amsterdam	"Golden Boy"	Paul Cleary
