= Nickola Shreli =

American actor, producer, and writer

- Born: Detroit, Michigan, U.S.
- Occupations: Actor; producer; writer
- Years active: 2002–present
- Children: 2
- Website: nickolashreli.com

Nickola Shreli (Nikolla Shkreli) is an American actor, writer, and filmmaker. He is best known for creating and starring in the indie film, Cash Only, and his recent performance as Peter Hoxha in Starz's Power Book IV: Force.

His onscreen credits include Abduction (directed by John Singleton), Hostel: Part III, Low Winter Sun, The Red Road (opposite Jason Momoa), and Tulsa King.

== Early Life ==
Born to Albanian immigrants in Detroit's working-class suburbs, Shreli's path to cinema began in high school theater before evolving through Detroit's underground film scene. He attended Eisenhower High School's theater program.

== Career ==
Shreli initially worked on smaller projects in Detroit's underground independent film scene and did production on larger projects, such as 8 Mile, that came to town. In 2010, he won an audition for Abduction, and John Singleton cast him as a lead villain in the role of "Alec".

In 2013, Shreli appeared in nine episodes of Low Winter Sun, an adaptation of a British miniseries starring Mark Strong that filmed in Detroit. Shreli played a bartender associated with organized crime. Although AMC cancelled the neo-noir police drama after one season, it has continued to attract attention on its streaming service.

In 2010, Shreli began working on a script inspired by his experiences working as a landlord and living in an Albanian immigrant community. He collaborated with Director Malik Bader on the project, which would become Cash Only. He produced the indie crime drama during an era of generous state-level incentives for filmmakers, benefitting from experienced crew that had worked other Michigan-filmed major studio projects. Additionally, Shreli starred as the movie’s protagonist. A low budget, an extremely tight schedule, and winter weather made filming difficult. The Detroit Free Press quoted Shreli saying, “We ended up doing the film in 13 days, it was a suicide mission. It was freezing hell, and it was all run-and-gun, survival tactics.” Eventually, Cash Only premiered and won an award for best direction at the 2015 Fantasia International Film Festival.

In 2026, Shreli joined the cast of Tulsa King as a series regular on the fifth season, currently filming in New York. He also voiced an Albanian-speaking character in the 2026 videogame, Grand Theft Auto VI.

Through his Detroit-based company, Nickname Projects, Shreli has produced a range of features, including Killerman (starring Liam Hemsworth) and Zana (Kosovo's official submission to the 92nd Academy Awards). The Killerman project reunited him with his previous collaborator Malik Bader, and he also performed a supporting role.

== Charity ==
Since 2007 Nickola Shreli has been involved with both the World Vision (Christian humanitarian organization) Vlore Area Project in Albania as well as Mother Teresa's Missionaries of Charity Branch in Detroit.

== Filmography ==
Year	Media	Character
2006	Law & Order: Criminal Intent	Tommy
2011	Abduction	Alec
2011	Hostel: Part III	Viktor
2011	Cargo	(short movie)
2012	Mafia	Corner man
2013	Low Winter Sun	Gus
2014	The Red Road (TV series)	Duke
2015	Cash Only	Elvis Martini
2017	APB	Randall Hatcher
2019	Killerman	Leon Duffo
2019	Line of Duty	Hendrix
2023	Semblance Amiss	Jedo
2024	Charon	(short film)
2025	Power Book IV: Force	Peter Hoxha
2026	Grand Theft Auto VI	Burim
