= Cash Only (film) =

- Theatrical release poster
- Directed by: Malik Bader
- Written by: Nickola Shreli
- Produced by: Ele Bardha; Nickola Shreli
- Starring: Nickola Shreli
- Cinematography: Christos Moisides
- Edited by: Matt Diezel
- Music by: Julian DeMarre
- Production companies: Nickname Projects; Bardha Productions
- Distributed by: FilmBuff
- Release dates: July 23, 2015 (Fantasia); May 13, 2016 (US)
- Running time: 88 minutes
- Countries: Albania; United States
- Languages: English; Albanian

Cash Only (styled as CA$H ⃠ NLY) is a 2015 American-Albanian crime thriller film directed by Malik Bader. It stars Nickola Shreli, who also wrote and produced, as a landlord who is forced to resort to increasingly desperate measures to pay off his debts to banks, a loan shark, and a local mob boss. It premiered at the 2015 Fantasia International Film Festival and was released in the US on May 13, 2016.

== Plot ==
Elvis Martini, an Albanian-American landlord in Detroit, commits arson in an insurance scam. Unknown to him, his wife returned home early and dies in the fire, leaving him to parent their daughter alone. Two years later, a judge gives him a brief extension to repay his debts to the bank. At the same time, he owes money to a loan shark. As increasing pressure is put on Martini to pay his debts, he attempts to collect money owed him from his tenants, many of whom are unable to pay. These include fellow Albanian Leka and Leka's fiancee, Blerta, with whom Martini is having an affair. Frustrated, Martini pressures Kush, a tenant who grows marijuana, to agree to new terms, including a cut of Kush's profits and increased rent. Kush reluctantly agrees but warns that their friendship has now become strained. When she refuses to pay her back rent, he threatens to evict Rolexa, a prostitute.

Using security cameras hidden in the apartments, Martini spies on his tenants. He sees Rolexa stash something in her apartment, and, while she is out, hires his friend Agroni to change her lock. In her apartment, Martini finds enough money to put his daughter back in a private Catholic school and make payments to both the bank and the loan shark. After briefly taking care of Rolexa's unsupervised son, Martini evicts her, dismissing her threats. Although his situation looks to improve, Martini is interrupted during sex with Blerta by thugs who knock him unconscious and kidnap his daughter. Dino, a mob boss, tells Martini that he has until the next night to return the money Rolexa stole from him plus more in penalties. Martini tracks down Rolexa, attempting to reason with her, but finds her dead.

Martini hurriedly sets up a rent scam where he takes a cash-only security deposit from many people for the same apartment. Still short thousands of dollars, he sells his car to Agroni, who owns a garage, and pawns most of his possessions. After Kush refuses to help, Martini sneaks into Kush's apartment, knocks him unconscious, and steals his drug money. Martini splits the money into two bags and meets Dino's thugs. After they stuff him in a car trunk, Martini calls Agroni and tells him to get help from Pete Cantor, a local cop. At Dino's warehouse, Martini offers one bag and says he will reveal the location of the second once he has his daughter. Dino instead tortures Martini, who quickly reveals the location of the second bag. As Dino threatens to rape and kill Martini in front of his daughter, Cantor, Leka, and several Albanians arrive, killing Dino's thugs. Martini kills Dino with a hidden pocket knife and reunites with his daughter, saying that he knows he does not deserve her.

== Cast ==
- Nickola Shreli as Elvis Martini
- Stivi Paskoski as Dino
- Danijela Stajnfeld as Blerta
- Herion Mustafaraj as Agroni
- Maia Noni as Rolexa
- Christian "Trick Trick" Mathis as Jag
- Ele Bardha as Pete Cantor
- Arian Camaj as Leka
- Malik Bader as Kush

== Production ==
Nickola Shreli contacted Malik Bader after seeing Street Thief and suggested a collaboration. Bader agreed, and the film was financed through the life savings of Shreli and Ele Bardha, who played the loan shark Pete Cantor. Shreli, who wrote the script, always intended to play the lead himself. The part of mob boss Dino went uncast until a week before principal photography, when Stivi Paskoski auditioned from a cell phone. Bader cited holding out for the proper casting as one of the lessons learned from this production. Shooting took place in Detroit, Michigan, over the course of 13 days in winter 2013. Because of the shooting schedule and editing concerns, some scenes did not make the theatrical cut. Bader wanted to emphasize the role of religion and theme of redemption in the film, but he said audiences can see these ideas by reading between the lines. Bader's character, the drug grower Kush, was originally intended to be more ambiguous and unpredictable while still being the closest thing to a friend that Martini has. A scene that hinted at a possibly violent background had to be cut when there was no way to organically include it.

== Release ==
Cash Only premiered at the Fantasia International Film Festival on July 23, 2015. FilmBuff released it in the US on May 13, 2016.

== Reception ==
Rotten Tomatoes reports that 100% of eight surveyed critics gave the film a positive review; the average rating is 6.2/10. Metacritic rated it 71/100 based on four reviews. John DeFore of The Hollywood Reporter called it "a tense crime film augmented by persuasive local color". DeFore describes the writing as giving justifiable circumstances for Martini's actions, and says the film's Eastern European antagonist is more credible than his counterparts. Ken Jaworowski of The New York Times selected it as an NYT Critics' Pick and wrote that the film is brutal and gritty, but its authenticity mirrors the unpleasantness of real life. Serena Donadoni wrote in The Village Voice, "Cash Only features many familiar action movie markers, but it's distinguished by a raw energy and strong sense of place."

Bader won Best Director at Fantasia.
