= The Happy House =

- Poster
- Directed by: D. W. Young
- Written by: D. W. Young
- Produced by: Judith Mizrachy
- Starring: Khan Baykal; Aya Cash; Marceline Hugot; Kathleen McNenny; Oliver Henzler; Mike Houston; Charles Borland
- Cinematography: Arlene Muller
- Edited by: D. W. Young
- Music by: David Ullmann
- Release date: May 3, 2013 (Cinema Village)
- Running time: 80 minutes
- Country: United States
- Language: English

The Happy House is a 2013 American comedy horror film written and directed by D. W. Young and starring Khan Baykal, Aya Cash, Marceline Hugot, Kathleen McNenny, Oliver Henzler, Mike Houston and Charles Borland.

== Cast ==
- Khan Baykal as Joe
- Aya Cash as Wendy
- Marceline Hugot as Hildie
- Kathleen McNenny as Linda
- Oliver Henzler as Hverven
- Mike Houston as Skip
- Charles Borland as Desmond
- Stivi Paskoski as Ronnie
- Curtis Shumaker as Deputy Marvin

== Release ==
The film premiered in Cinema Village on May 3, 2013.

== Reception ==
The film has a 60 percent rating on Rotten Tomatoes based on five reviews.

Chuck Bowen of Slant Magazine awarded the film two and a half stars out of four and wrote "D.W. Young navigates his varying moods with an ease that’s particularly impressive for a director making his feature debut, but he never capitalizes on his ability to coax down our guard."

The Hollywood Reporter gave the film a negative review: "Neither funny nor scary, this horror spoof mainly just coasts along."
