= Deirdra Elizabeth Govan =

American costume designer for film and television

- Born: U.S.
- Occupation: Costume designer
- Years active: 1998–present

Deirdra Elizabeth Govan is an American costume designer for film and television. She is best known for her work on I'm a Virgo, Harlem, Devotion and Sorry to Bother You.

== Career ==
Govan graduated from Pratt Institute and Parsons School of Design. She started her costume designer career in theater productions on Broadway shows like Miss Saigon, Les Miserables and Phantom of the Opera. She is the vice president of IATSE and United Scenic Artists, Local USA 829. She was invited to become a member of Academy of Motion Picture Arts and Sciences in 2023.

== Filmography ==
=== Film ===
- 2024 - Rob Peace
- 2024 - Exhibiting Forgiveness
- 2023 - Happiness for Beginners
- 2022 - Devotion
- 2019 - The Sun Is Also a Star
- 2018 - Sorry to Bother You
- 2017 - Krystal
- 2017 - The Unattainable Story
- 2015 - Stealing Cars
- 2000 - Intern
- 1999 - Big Helium Dog
- 1998 - The Reunion
- 1998 - Went to Coney Island on a Mission from God... Be Back by Five

=== Television ===
- 2023 - I'm a Virgo
- 2021-2023 - Harlem
- 2019-2021 - First Wives Club
- 2019-2020 - The L Word: Generation Q

== Awards and nominations ==
Year	Result	Award	Category	Work	Ref.
2019	Nominated	Black Reel Awards	Outstanding Costume Design	Sorry to Bother You	
2024	Nominated	NAACP Image Awards	Costume Design, Make-up and Hairstyling	I'm a Virgo	
