= American Fiction (soundtrack) =

American Fiction (Original Motion Picture Soundtrack)

Film score by Laura Karpman
- Released: December 15, 2023
- Recorded: 2023
- Studios: Abbey Road Studios, London
- Genre: Film score
- Length: 46:59
- Label: Sony Masterworks
- Producer: Laura Karpman

Laura Karpman chronology
The Marvels (2023)	American Fiction (2023)

American Fiction is the soundtrack to the 2023 film of the same name directed by Cord Jefferson, based on the 2001 novel Erasure by Percival Everett. The film's musical score composed by Laura Karpman featured 21 tracks from the film score for around 47 minutes. The soundtrack was released by Sony Masterworks on December 15, 2023, alongside the film.

== Track listing ==
No.	Title	Artist(s)	Length
1.	"Family Is, Monk Is"		4:53
2.	"Boston, MA"		1:18
3.	"Bookstore"		2:07
4.	"Beautiful Family"		1:52
5.	"Humans Remain"		1:38
6.	"My Pafology"		3:16
7.	"Hi Lorraine"		2:54
8.	"Drips"		1:51
9.	"Goodnight Monk"		1:13
10.	"Mother Is (Missing)"		1:38
11.	"Brothers"		1:10
12.	"Splash"		2:21
13.	"Love All of You"		1:11
14.	"Lunch Break"		0:45
15.	"Sorry"		1:41
16.	"Winner"		1:17
17.	"Romantic Ending"		1:36
18.	"(Elena's) Monk Is"	Laura Karpman; Elena Pinderhughes	2:19
19.	"(Patrice's) Monk Is"	Karpman; Patrice Rushen	4:18
20.	"(Patrice's) Family Is"	Karpman; Rushen	2:56
21.	"(Laura's) Stagg R. Leigh"		1:09
22.	"(Laura's) Fever Dream"		3:36
Total length:			46:59

== Reception ==
Amy Nicholson of The New York Times called the work a "tender piano-forward score". Steve Pond of TheWrap called the score "indelible". Richard Lawson of Vanity Fair said that Karpman's "alternately jazzy and melancholy score is a highlight."

== Accolades ==
Award	Date of Ceremony	Category	Recipient(s)	Result	Ref
Hollywood Music in Media Awards	November 15, 2023	Original Score — Feature Film	Laura Karpman	Nominated	
Academy Awards	March 10, 2024	Best Original Score	Laura Karpman	Nominated	
Grammy Awards	February 2, 2025	Best Score Soundtrack for Visual Media	Laura Karpman	Nominated	
