= Killerman =

2019 action crime film by Malik Bader

- Theatrical release poster
- Directed by: Malik Bader
- Written by: Malik Bader
- Produced by: Mary Aloe; Craig Chapman; Myles Nestel; John Schwarz; Michael Schwarz; Ken Seng; Martin Sprock
- Starring: Liam Hemsworth; Emory Cohen; Diane Guerrero; Zlatko Buric; Suraj Sharma; Nickola Shreli
- Cinematography: Ken Seng
- Edited by: Rick Grayson
- Music by: Julian DeMarre; Heiko Maile
- Production companies: Solution Entertainment Group; Deeper Water; Bader Bros. Pictures; Digital Ignition Entertainment
- Distributed by: Blue Fox Entertainment
- Release date: August 30, 2019 (United States)
- Running time: 112 minutes
- Country: United States
- Language: English
- Box office: $614,366

Killerman is a 2019 American action crime film starring Liam Hemsworth, Emory Cohen, Diane Guerrero, Zlatko Buric, Suraj Sharma, and Nickola Shreli. It was theatrically released in the United States on August 30, 2019.

== Plot ==
Moe and Bobby "Skunk" Santos are money launderers for Perico, who is also Bobby's uncle. They are both given a large job which involves $20 million in 10 days.

As they are both about to launder the money they get a call from Perico to not do anything and just sit on the money until he rings them again. This gives Bobby an opportunity to make a fast buck by doing a drug deal and making some extra money. He involves Moe who reluctantly agrees after initially refusing.

They go to see an Indian shopkeeper Fedex who is told he will make $60,000 in a few hours if he gives them the phone number of the drug dealer. Hesitantly he gives them the phone number of Debo, a local drug dealer and contact him to set up a once only deal.

But Debo is in cahoots with some dirty cops who have "borrowed" the drugs from the evidence room so that they can steal the money, and the drugs, once the deal is done. Debo is given 1 kg of drugs, for his help and told to run with his gang by the cops whilst they ambush Moe and Bobby at the drug deal.

Unbeknownst to the cops, Moe has set up a shooter who helps them take the money and drugs back off the cops and escape with the cops in hot pursuit. Whilst getting away Moe crashes his car and loses his memory whilst Bobby has a few scratches.

They manage to hide from the pursuing dirty cops who want their drugs and the money.

However, Moe has amnesia and is vulnerable with the cash and drugs.

Skunk and Moe go to see Skunk's uncle on his mother's side, a crime boss in the middle of a real estate deal with a congressman and being vetted by the biggest bank in New York. Skunk's uncle tells them that because they messed things up they must leave New York forever. Before they do, Moe insists he must see his apartment. At the apartment they find his pregnant girlfriend and Skunk leaves and tells them to be ready when he returns. When Skunk returns, so do the dirty cops. They capture Skunk and shoot Moe's girlfriend who later dies at a hospital. Moe goes to see Skunk's uncle, who agrees to help.

Moe is able to rescue Skunk and they take the cash and drugs to Skunk's uncle. His uncle assaults Moe after being tipped off by an FBI agent that Moe is an undercover cop called Killerman. Skunk's uncle informs him that Moe's girlfriend did not die but his unborn child did and then tells him to kill Moe by emptying a clip in his head. Instead of killing Moe, Skunk kills his uncle and his uncle's men. Skunk tells Moe that his uncle would have killed them both and not mentioning that Moe is a cop and his girlfriend is alive. They take a car, the money and drugs and leave New York. In credits, it's said that no one knows their whereabouts and that it is unknown whether Moe ever got his memory back.

== Cast ==
- Liam Hemsworth as Moe Diamond
- Emory Cohen as Bobby "Skunk" Santos, Perico's nephew
- Diane Guerrero as Lola
- Zlatko Buric as Perico, Skunk's uncle
- Suraj Sharma as Fedex
- Nickola Shreli as Leon Duffo, a corrupt cop
- Mike Moh as Baracuta, a corrupt cop
- John Elizabeth Johnson as Mark Elizabeth Lynch

== Reception ==
On Rotten Tomatoes, the film has a score of 32% based on 19 reviews, with an average rating of 3.6/10. The site's critical consensus reads, "It's occasionally effective as a bare-bones action thriller, but Killerman's willingness to settle for mediocrity prevents it from reaching its tantalizing true potential."
