= Christopher Browne (director) =

American documentary filmmaker

- Other name: Chris Browne
- Education: University of Pennsylvania
- Occupations: film director and producer
- Notable work: A League of Ordinary Gentlemen; After The Cup: Sons of Sakhnin United

Christopher Browne, also known as Chris Browne, is an American documentary film maker and director. He is noted for directing the sports documentaries that "shed light on the oddballs and underdogs of the sporting world."

== Early life ==
Browne is a graduate of the University of Pennsylvania. While there, he was a varsity squash player and a member of St. Anthony Hall.

== Career ==
Browne's film career began in New York City as a production assistant on television commercials.

He then took a job on a documentary called The Paris Review…Early Chapters (2001) produced by Checkerboard Films. The movie, which chronicled George Plimpton's early years at the Paris Review, offered the opportunity to work alongside legendary documentarian Albert Maysles. Working with Mr. Maysles spurred Brownes' interest in documentary film and he stayed at the Checkerboard Films another year where he supervised the post-production of The Paris Review: Early Years, and helped produce Ralph Gibson: Photographer/Book Artist (2002).

In 2002, Browne co-founded Dionysian Films with Bill Bryan and his brother Alex Browne and friend Bill Bryan.

=== A League of Ordinary Gentlemen ===
A League of Ordinary Gentlemen (2004) was his first feature film, emerging from following the Professional Bowlers Association tour with cameras for twenty weeks. The documentary premiered at the 2004 South by Southwest Film Festival where it won the Audience Choice award. It was also screened at AFI Fest, Cinevegas, and the Tribeca Film Festival. Variety noted, "First-time helmer Chris Browne’s sense of humor captures perfectly the contradictions, absurdities and drama at the intersection of class, media, money and sports without dissing any of his player/subjects." It was televised nationally on the PBS series Independent Lens on April 25, 2006.

=== After the Cup ===
After The Cup: Sons of Sakhnin United (2010) was Browne's second feature film and was distributed by Variance Films. Also a documentary, After the Cup chronicles the story of the Israeli soccer team from the town of Sakhnin, Israel. The story follows the players, coaches, and fans as they journey together after winning the national cup. This win is significant because aside from the lack of funding, Bnei Sakhnin F.C. is also notable for being composed mostly of Arab players with a Jewish owner and a Jewish coach.

After The Cup has been welcomed with critical acclaim when it played at the Tribeca Film Festival, the Boston Jewish Film Festival, the Washington Jewish Film Festival, and Kicking and Screening Soccer Film Festival as well as others from around the country. The film was released May 21, 2010. Vanity Fair said the film was "an energetic, edge-of-your-seat genuine crowd pleaser."
