= Street Thief =

- Directed by: Malik Bader
- Written by: Derrick Grahn
- Produced by: Sam Bader, Derrick Grahn
- Starring: Malik Bader
- Cinematography: Ken Seng
- Music by: Phirefones (Berlin, Germany) (Julian Boyd, Tobias Vethake, Simon Ayton)
- Release date: August 7, 2006
- Running time: 84 minutes
- Country: United States
- Language: English

Street Thief is a 2006 mockumentary that follows the life of putative Chicago burglar Kaspar Karr (alternatively Kaspar Carr), played by Malik Bader. The film was directed by Malik Bader.

The film was met with favorable reception at the Tribeca Film Festival. Although filmed as though it were a documentary, the movie and story line are fictional. The burglaries and tactics employed in the film are said to have been based on actual crimes.

== Plot ==
The movie follows the life of Chicago burglar Kaspar Karr. In the introduction, Kaspar cases and robs a Mexican Grocery Store. He counts up his score and introduces himself. He refuses to answer certain questions. His next mark is another grocery owned by Indians. He shows his expertise in social engineering, stalking, and intelligence gathering and discusses his careful, meticulous planning cycles.

Soon afterwards, before the heist, he calls the camera crew to follow him as he cases another joint. The director is introduced as he interjects questions and worries about the new target. The night after, Kaspar and the crew break into the club. With no lay out or plan, Kaspar desperately ravages the owner's office until he finds a drawer full of money, at which point he begins to panic and tells the director to turn the camera off.

Two months pass and Kaspar contacts the crew to shoot once more. The local Cinemark in a suburban neighborhood is the new target. Kaspar succeeds in making a new plan and, after much staking out, pulls off the heist with no problems while the crew films him. Three days later the crew pass by Kaspar's warehouse to find the police in the parking lot. The crew learns that Kaspar Karr's vehicle was discovered with a large amount of blood in and around it.

The film ends with speculation as to whether Kaspar was killed in retaliation by the owner of the club, or left the Chicago area to start his life over elsewhere.
