= Juel Taylor =

American director and screenwriter (born 1987)

- Education: University of Florida; University of Southern California
- Years active: 2012–present

Juel Taylor is an American filmmaker. He wrote Creed II (2018), Space Jam: A New Legacy (2021) and They Cloned Tyrone (2023) with his writing partner Tony Rettenmaier.

== Early life and education ==
Taylor was initially interested in studying video game design when he attended college at the University of Florida.

His first introduction to making movies was a music video he created for his college's digital arts program. Taylor then studied film as a graduate student at the University of Southern California's School of Cinematic Arts, where he met Rettenmaier.

== Career ==
In 2017, Taylor co-directed Actors Anonymous, the feature film adaptation of James Franco's novel of the same name. The film screened at Cinequest and the Newport Beach Film Festival.

For They Cloned Tyrone, Taylor used the neighborhood where he grew up as the main inspiration for the fictional city in the film. He says Tyrone was inspired by his desire to make "a bootleg 'Scooby-Doo' movie", combined with real-life experiences including "friends back home who had some pretty, like, unfortunate circumstances hit them." The draft changed through the pitching process, eventually leading to the movie being produced as a Netflix feature film. Taylor thanked Guillermo del Toro for help with editing several scenes.

== Filmography ==
Short film

Year	Title	Director	Writer	Producer	Editor	Notes
2013	Shoebox	No	No	Yes	Yes	
2017	Riotville	Yes	Yes	Yes	Yes	
2023	Nightbear	Yes	Yes	No	No	Co-directed with Joel Marsh

Feature film

Year	Title	Director	Writer	Producer
2017	Actors Anonymous	Yes	No	No
2018	Creed II	No	Yes	No
2021	Space Jam: A New Legacy	No	Yes	No
2023	Young. Wild. Free.	No	Yes	Executive
2023	Shooting Stars	No	Yes	No
2023	They Cloned Tyrone	Yes	Yes	Yes

Television

Year	Title	Notes
2013	Fred Unplugged	TV movie
2013	A Guy, a Girl, and Their Monster	Episode "Monster Off"
2019	Boomerang	Episode "Housekeeping"
2020	Twenties	Episodes "You Know How I Like It" and "Ain't Nothing Like The Real Thing"
